= Nicky Jam discography =

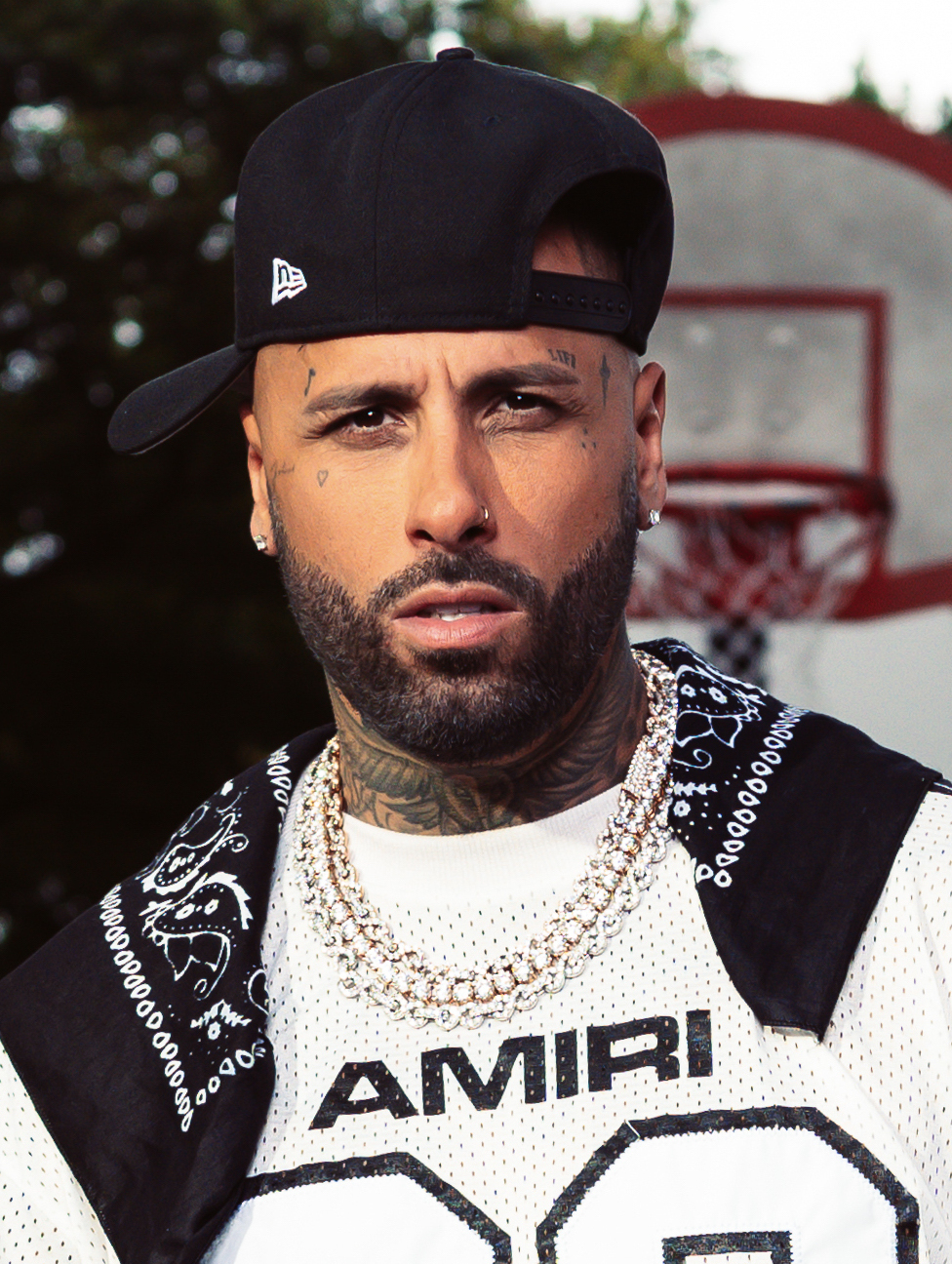
- Studio albums: 6
- EPs: 2
- Compilation albums: 3
- Singles: 57

American singer Nicky Jam has released six studio albums, three compilation albums, two EPs, one mixtape, and 57 singles as a lead artist.

== Albums ==
=== Studio albums ===
List of studio albums, with selected chart positions, sales figures, and certifications
Title	Album details	Peak chart positions								Certifications
Title	Album details	US	US Latin	BEL	CAN	FRA	ITA	SPA	SWI	Certifications
Vida escante	Released: November 23, 2004; Label: Pina Records; Format: CD, digital download	—	23	—	—	—	—	79	—	
The Black Carpet	Released: December 11, 2007; Label: Pina Records; Format: CD, digital download	—	24	—	—	—	—	—	—	
Fénix	Released: January 20, 2017; Label: Sony Music Entertainment; Format: CD, digital download	28	1	160	99	96	68	35	5	RIAA: 11× Platinum (Latin); FIMI: Platinum; SNEP: Gold
Íntimo	Released: November 1, 2019; Label: Sony Music Entertainment; Format: CD, digital download	132	3	—	—	120	70	—	67	RIAA: 4× Platinum (Latin)
Infinity	Released: August 27, 2021; Labels: La Industria Inc, Sony Latin, RCA; Format: CD, digital download	—	9	—	—	—	—	13	—	
Insomnio	Released: September 6, 2024; Labels: Sony Latin; Format: Digital download, streaming	—	—	—	—	—	—	29	—	
"—" denotes a title that did not chart, or was not released in that territory.

=== Compilation albums ===
List of compilation albums, with selected chart positions, sales figures, and certifications
Title	Album details	Peak chart positions
Title	Album details	US Latin
Salón de la fama	Released: July 1, 2003; Label: White Lion Records / El Cartel Records; Format: CD, digital download	69
Nicky Jam Hits	Released: September 9, 2014; Label: Codiscos Records / La Industria Inc.; Format: CD, digital download	—
Greatest Hits, Vol. 1	Released: December 15, 2014; Label: Codiscos Records / Sony Music Entertainment; Format: CD, digital download	18

=== Extended plays ===
Title	Album details
...Distinto a los demás	Released: 1995; Label: F & K Records; Format: CD, digital download
Haciendo escante	Released: December 4, 2001; Label: Pina Records; Format: CD, digital download

=== Mixtapes ===
Title	Album details
The Black Mixtape	Released: 2009; Self Released; Format : File

== Singles ==
=== As lead artist ===
List of singles as lead artist, with selected chart positions, showing year released and album name
Title	Year	Peak chart positions										Certifications	Album
Title	Year	US	US Latin	ARG	CAN	COL	FRA	GER	ITA	SPA	SWE	Certifications	Album
"Vamos a Perrear"	2001	—	—	—	—	—	—	—	—	—	—		Haciendo escante
"En la Cama" (featuring Daddy Yankee)	2001	—	—	—	—	—	—	—	—	—	—	PROMUSICAE: Gold	Haciendo escante
"La Vamos a Montar"	2003	—	—	—	—	—	—	—	—	—	—		Salón de la fama
"Buscarte" (featuring Daddy Yankee)	2003	—	—	—	—	—	—	—	—	—	—		Salón de la fama
"No Soy Tu Marido"	2005	—	48	—	—	—	—	—	—	—	—	PROMUSICAE: Gold	Non-album single
"Gas Pela"	2008	—	45	—	—	—	—	—	—	—	—		The Black Carpet
"Travesuras"	2014	—	4	—	—	1	—	—	45	3	—	FIMI: 2× Platinum; PROMUSICAE: 4× Platinum	Greatest Hits, Vol. 1
"Voy A Beber"	2014	—	—	—	—	—	—	—	—	—	—	PROMUSICAE: Gold	Greatest Hits, Vol. 1
"Si tu no estás" (featuring De La Ghetto)	2015	—	34	—	—	—	—	—	—	78	—	FIMI: Gold; PROMUSICAE: Gold	Greatest Hits, Vol. 1
"El Perdón" / "Forgiveness" (with Enrique Iglesias)	2015	56	1	—	82	—	1	8	1	1	4	RIAA: 27× Platinum (Latin); BVMI: 3× Gold; FIMI: 8× Platinum; GLF: 6× Platinum; IFPI SWI: 3× Platinum; MC: 2× Platinum; PROMUSICAE: 6× Platinum; SNEP: Gold	Fénix
"Hasta el Amanecer"	2016	73	1	—	—	—	38	—	28	2	—	RIAA: 22× Platinum (Latin); FIMI: 2× Platinum; IFPI SWI: Gold; MC: Platinum; PROMUSICAE: 4× Platinum; SNEP: Diamond	Fénix
"De Pies A Cabeza" (with Maná)	2016	—	8	—	—	—	—	—	—	36	—	PROMUSICAE: Gold	Non-album single
"El Amante"	2017	92	2	—	—	3	135	—	17	3	—	RIAA: 13× Platinum (Latin); FIMI: 3× Platinum; IFPI SWI: Platinum; MC: Platinum; PROMUSICAE: 4× Platinum; SNEP: Gold	Fénix
"Si Tú la Ves" (featuring Wisin)	2017	—	18	—	—	9	—	—	—	50	—	FIMI: Gold; PROMUSICAE: Platinum	Fénix
"Bella y Sensual" (with Romeo Santos and Daddy Yankee)	2017	95	6	—	—	6	—	—	—	30	—	RIAA: 6× Platinum (Latin); FIMI: Gold; MC: Gold; PROMUSICAE: 2× Platinum	Golden
"Cásate Conmigo" (with Silvestre Dangond)	2017	—	17	—	—	1	—	—	—	—	—	RIAA: 9× Platinum (Latin); PROMUSICAE: Gold	Intruso
"X" (with J Balvin or Remix featuring Maluma and Ozuna)	2018	41	1	20	39	2	5	13	1	1	30	RIAA: 35× Platinum (Latin); BVMI: Gold; FIMI: 3× Platinum; IFPI SWI: 2× Platinum; MC: 3× Platinum; PROMUSICAE: 3× Platinum; PROMUSICAE: Platinum (Remix); SNEP: Diamond	Íntimo
"Live It Up" (featuring Will Smith and Era Istrefi)	2018	—	—	—	—	—	35	21	68	59	24	IFPI SWI: Gold	2018 FIFA World Cup Official Theme Song
"Satisfacción" (with Bad Bunny and Arcángel)	2018	—	35	—	—	—	—	—	—	—	—		Non-album singles
"La Diabla" (with Alex Sensation)	2018	—	36	94	—	—	—	—	—	—	—		Non-album singles
"Jaleo" (with Steve Aoki)	2018	—	24	26	—	—	—	—	—	78	—		Non-album singles
"Good Vibes" (with Fuego)	2018	—	—	—	—	—	—	—	—	44	—	RIAA: 2× Platinum (Latin); PROMUSICAE: Platinum	Non-album singles
"Baby" (with Amenazzy and Farruko)	2018	—	46	40	—	—	—	—	—	31	—	RIAA: 2× Platinum (Latin); PROMUSICAE: Platinum	Non-album singles
"Que Le Dé" (with Rauw Alejandro)	2019	—	42	77	—	—	—	—	—	77	—	RIAA: 2× Platinum (Latin); PROMUSICAE: Gold	Non-album singles
"Back in the City" (with Alejandro Sanz)	2019	—	—	—	—	—	—	—	—	20	—		#ElDisco
"Te Robaré" (with Ozuna)	2019	91	6	7	—	1	—	—	28	7	—	FIMI: Platinum; IFPI SWI: Gold; PROMUSICAE: 3× Platinum	Íntimo
"Date La Vuelta" (with Luis Fonsi and Sebastián Yatra)	2019	—	31	25	—	64	—	—	—	23	—	PROMUSICAE: Platinum	Non-album single
"Comerte A Besos" (with Justin Quiles and Wisin)	2019	—	—	95	—	—	—	—	—	—	—		Realidad
"Cuaderno" (with Dalex and Justin Quiles featuring Sech, Lenny Tavárez, Feid and Rafa Pabön)	2019	—	47	13	—	—	—	—	—	15	—	RIAA: Diamond (Latin); PROMUSICAE: 2× Platinum	Climaxxx
"Ven y Hazlo Tú" (with J Balvin, Anuel AA and Arcángel)	2019	—	39	72	—	—	—	—	—	56	—		Non-album single
"Mona Lisa" (with Nacho)	2019	—	—	—	—	—	—	—	—	—	—		Uno
"Rebota" (Remix) (with Guaynaa, Farruko featuring Becky G and Sech)	2019	—	28	18	—	33	—	—	—	24	—	RIAA: Platinum (Latin); PROMUSICAE: Platinum	Non-album single
"Atrévete" (with Sech)	2019	—	23	26	—	42	—	—	—	42	—	PROMUSICAE: Platinum	Íntimo
"El Favor" (with Dímelo Flow and Farruko featuring Sech, Zion and Lunay)	2019	—	21	26	—	3	—	—	—	30	—	RIAA: 2× Platinum (Latin); PROMUSICAE: Platinum	Non-album singles
"Mi Ex" (with Ñejo)	2019	—	45	81	—	21	—	—	—	—	—	RIAA: Gold (Latin)	Non-album singles
"Bota Fuego" (with Mau y Ricky or Remix with Dalex)	2019	—	—	72	—	33	—	—	—	—	—		Non-album singles
"Whine Up" (with Anuel AA)	2019	—	17	18	—	3	—	—	—	3	—	PROMUSICAE: 2× Platinum	Íntimo
"Muévelo" (with Daddy Yankee)	2020	— (Note: "Muévelo" did not enter the Billboard Hot 100, but peaked at number 13 on the Billboard Bubbling Under Hot 100 Singles chart.)	10	6	—	1	—	—	78	9	—	RIAA: 3× Platinum (Latin); FIMI: Gold; PROMUSICAE: 2× Platinum	Bad Boys for Life
"Vida Loca" (with Black Eyed Peas and Tyga)	2020	—	—	—	—	—	68	98	—	—	—		Translation
"Despacio" (with Natti Natasha and Manuel Turizo featuring Myke Towers, DJ Luian and Mambo Kingz)	2020	—	39	—	—	—	—	—	—	64	—		Non-album singles
"A Correr Los Lakers" (Remix) (with El Alfa and Ozuna featuring Arcángel and Secreto "El Famoso Biberón")	2020	—	—	—	—	—	—	—	—	—	—	PROMUSICAE: Gold	Non-album singles
"Wow!" (Remix) (with Bryant Myers and Arcángel Featuring Darell and El Alfa)	2020	—	36	—	—	—	—	—	—	88	—	RIAA: Gold (Latin)	Bendecido
"Polvo" (with Myke Towers)	2020	—	15	24	—	34	—	—	—	15	—	PROMUSICAE: 2× Platinum	Infinity
"Fan de Tus Fotos" (with Romeo Santos)	2021	—	11	—	—	13	—	—	—	32	—	PROMUSICAE: Platinum	Infinity
"Pikete" (with El Alfa)	2021	—	32	—	—	—	—	—	—	—	—		Infinity
"Poblado" (Remix) (with J Balvin and Karol G, featuring Crissin, Totoy El Frio and Natan & Shander)	2021	— (Note: "Poblado" (Remix) did not enter the Billboard Hot 100, but peaked at number 20 on the Billboard Bubbling Under Hot 100 Singles chart.)	11	13	—	2	—	—	—	12	—	PROMUSICAE: Platinum	Jose
"Nicky Jam: Bzrp Music Sessions, Vol. 41" (with Bizarrap)	2021	—	38	1	—	—	—	—	—	3	—	PROMUSICAE: 2× Platinum	Non-album single
"Miami"	2021	—	33	80	—	—	—	—	—	98	—		Infinity
"Magnum" (with Jhay Cortez)	2021	—	41	—	—	—	—	—	—	78	—		Infinity
"Ojos Rojos"	2022	—	17	—	—	—	—	—	—	62	—	PROMUSICAE: Gold	Non-album single
"Si Te Preguntan... (with Prince Royce and Jay Wheeler)	2022	—	31	—	—	—	—	—	—	96		RIAA: 3× Platinum (Latin); PROMUSICAE: Gold	Llamada Perdida
"Toy A Mil"	2023	—	30	—	—	—	—	—	—	—	—		Non-album single
"69" (with Feid)	2023	—	41	90	—	—	—	—	—	24	—	PROMUSICAE: Platinum	Insomnio
"Calor" (with Beéle)	2023	—	—	—	—	—	—	—	—	—	—	PROMUSICAE: Gold	Insomnio
"Oye BB" (with Omar Montes)	2023	—	—	—	—	—	—	—	—	43	—	PROMUSICAE: Gold	Non-album singles
"La Cyber" (with Luar La L)	2024	—	—	—	—	—	—	—	—	65	—		Non-album singles
"Hiekka" (with Beéle)	2025	—	—	—	—	—	—	—	—	10	—		
"—" denotes a title that did not chart, or was not released in that territory.

=== As featured artist ===
List of singles as featured artist, with selected chart positions, showing year released and album name
Title	Year	Peak chart positions								Certifications	Album
Title	Year	US	US Latin	ARG	CAN	COL	FRA	SPA	SWE	Certifications	Album
"Los 12 Discípulos" (Eddie Dee featuring Daddy Yankee, Ivy Queen, Tego Calderón, Julio Voltio, Vico C, Zion & Lennox, Nicky Jam, Johnny Prez, Gallego, and Wiso G)	2004	—	—	—	—	—	—	—	—		12 Discípulos
"Suele Suceder" (Piso 21 featuring Nicky Jam)	2014	—	—	—	—	—	—	—	—		Canciones Que Nos Marcaron
"Adicto a Tus Redes" (Tito El Bambino featuring Nicky Jam)	2014	—	45	—	—	—	—	—	—		Alta Jerarquía
"Una Cita" (Remix) (Alkilados featuring J Álvarez, Nicky Jam and El Roockie)	2014	—	—	—	—	—	—	99	—		Non-album single
"Sunset" (Farruko Featuring Shaggy and Nicky Jam)	2015	—	3	—	—	—	—	57	—	RIAA: 4× Platinum (Latin)	Visionary
"Te Busco" (Cosculluela featuring Nicky Jam)	2015	—	7	—	—	—	—	24	—	RIAA: 2× Platinum (Latin); PROMUSICAE: 2× Platinum	Blanco Perla
"Como Lo Hacia Yo" (Ken-Y featuring Nicky Jam)	2015	—	14	—	—	—	—	62	—	RIAA: 2× Platinum (Latin)	The King Of Romance
"Tumba La Casa" (Remix) (Alexio featuring Arcángel, De La Ghetto, Farruko, Zion, Ñengo Flow, Nicky Jam and Daddy Yankee)	2015	—	—	—	—	—	—	—	—	PROMUSICAE: Gold	Non-album single
"Ya Me Enteré" (Urban Version) (Reik featuring Nicky Jam)	2016	—	6	—	—	—	—	20	—	PROMUSICAE: 2× Platinum	Des/Amor
"Mi Tesoro" (Zion & Lennox featuring Nicky Jam)	2016	—	26	—	—	17	—	68	—	PROMUSICAE: Gold	Motivan2
"La Ocasión" (Remix) (DJ Luian and Mambo Kingz featuring Ozuna, De la Ghetto, Arcángel, Anuel AA, Daddy Yankee, Nicky Jam, Farruko, J Balvin, and Zion)	2017	—	—	—	—	—	—	—	—		Non-album singles
"Desperté Sin Ti" (Remix) (Noriel featuring Yandel and Nicky Jam)	2017	—	50	—	—	—	—	—	—	RIAA: 3× Platinum (Latin)	Non-album singles
"Bebé" (Remix) (Brytiago featuring Daddy Yankee and Nicky Jam)	2017	—	—	—	—	—	—	100	—		Non-album singles
"Ayer 2" (Anuel AA and DJ Nelson featuring Cosculluela, Nicky Jam and J Balvin)	2017	—	—	—	—	—	—	—	—	PROMUSICAE: Platinum	Non-album singles
"Si Tú Lo Dejas" (Rvssian featuring Kosa, Nicky Jam, Farruko and Bad Bunny)	2017	—	—	—	—	—	—	—	—	RIAA: 6× Platinum (Latin); PROMUSICAE: Gold	Non-album singles
"Una Lady Como Tú" (Remix) (Manuel Turizo featuring Nicky Jam)	2017	—	—	—	—	—	—	3	—	PROMUSICAE: 3× Platinum	ADN
"Perro Fiel" (Shakira featuring Nicky Jam)	2017	100	6	—	—	21	—	5	—	FIMI: Gold; IFPI SWI: Gold; MC: Gold; PROMUSICAE: 3× Platinum	El Dorado
"Bonita" (Remix) (J Balvin and Jowell & Randy featuring Nicky Jam, Yandel and Ozuna)	2017	— (Note: "Bonita" (Remix)" did not enter the Billboard Hot 100, but peaked at number 5 on the Billboard Bubbling Under Hot 100 Singles chart.)	26	—	—	—	—	8	—	PROMUSICAE: 3× Platinum	Non-album singles
"Te Boté" (Remix) (Nio García, Darell and Casper Mágico featuring Bad Bunny, Nicky Jam and Ozuna)	2018	36	1	27	98	10	—	—	—	RIAA: 10× Diamond (Latin); PROMUSICAE: 2× Platinum	Non-album singles
"Mi Cama" (Remix) (Karol G and J Balvin featuring Nicky Jam)	2018	— (Note: "Mi Cama" (remix)" did not enter the Billboard Hot 100, but peaked at number 5 on the Billboard Bubbling Under Hot 100 Singles chart.)	6	18	—	—	—	—	—	MC: Gold	Non-album singles
"Verte Ir" (DJ Luian and Mambo Kingz featuring Anuel AA, Nicky Jam, Darell and Brytiago)	2019	—	17	—	—	5	—	5	—	RIAA: 2× Diamond (Latin); FIMI: Gold; PROMUSICAE: 3× Platinum	Non-album singles
"Qué Más Pues" (Remix) Sech, Justin Quiles and Maluma featuring Nicky Jam, Farruko, Dalex and Lenny Tavárez)	2019	—	—	—	—	—	—	18	—	RIAA: Diamond (Latin); PROMUSICAE: 2× Platinum	Sueños
"Otro Trago" (Remix) (Sech featuring Nicky Jam, Ozuna and Anuel AA)	2019	34	1	1	—	—	—	2	96	PROMUSICAE: 3× Platinum	Non-album singles
"Loco Contigo" (Remix) (DJ Snake, J Balvin and Ozuna featuring Nicky Jam, Natti Natasha, Sech, and Darell)	2019	—	—	—	—	—	—	—	—		Non-album singles
"Yo No Sé" (Remix) (Mati Gómez featuring Nicky Jam and Reik)	2020	—	—	—	—	7	—	—	—		Non-album singles
"Color Esperanza 2020" (Various Artists) (Note: "Color Esperanza 2020" features Diego Torres, Coti Sorokin, Rubén Blades, Camila, Camilo, Pedro Capó, Dilsinho, Diego El Cigala, Farruko, Fonseca, Kany García, Leonel García, Gente de Zona, Leslie Grace, Nicky Jam, Lali, Ara Malikian, Dani Martín, Mau y Ricky, Prince Royce, Rauw Alejandro, Reik, Río Roma, Carlos Rivera, Ivete Sangalo, Thalía, Ángela Torres, Manuel Turizo, Jorge Villamizar and Carlos Vives.)	2020	—	—	—	—	—	—	—	—	PROMUSICAE: Gold	Non-album singles
"Porfa" (Remix) (Feid featuring J Balvin, Maluma, Nicky Jam, Sech and Justin Quiles)	2020	—	11	2	—	6	—	—	—		Bahía Ducati
"Dançarina" (Remix) (Pedro Sampaio, Anitta and Dadju featuring Nicky Jam and MC Pedrinho)	2022	—	—	—	—	—	11	—	—	SNEP: Diamond	Non-album single
"—" denotes a title that did not chart, or was not released in that territory.

== Other charted and certified songs ==
List of other charted and certified songs, with selected chart positions, showing year released and album name
Title	Year	Peak chart positions		Certifications	Album
Title	Year	US Latin	SPA	Certifications	Album
"Dónde Están las Gatas" (with Daddy Yankee)	2001	—	—	PROMUSICAE: 2× Platinum	Gárgolas 3
"Ya No Queda Nada" (Tito Nieves featuring India, Nicky Jam and K-Mil)	2004	23	—		Fabricando Fantasías
"No Sales de Mi Mente" (Yandel featuring Nicky Jam)	2015	—	61		Dangerous
"Si me dices que sí" (Cosculluela featuring Nicky Jam)	2016	—	69	PROMUSICAE: Gold	Blanco Perla
"Por El Momento" (featuring Plan B)	2017	49	—		Fénix
"Haciéndolo" (Ozuna featuring Nicky Jam)	2018	41	—		Aura
"Bad con Nicky" (with Bad Bunny)	2020	13	4	RIAA: 4× Platinum (Latin); PROMUSICAE: Platinum	Las que no iban a salir
"Leyendas" (with Karol G and Wisin & Yandel featuring Ivy Queen, Zion and Alberto Stylee)	2021	—	—	RIAA: Platinum (Latin)	KG0516
"—" denotes a title that did not chart, or was not released in that territory.
