= Salswing! =

Studio album by Rubén Blades and Roberto Delgado & Orquesta
- Released: April 16, 2021
- Studio: Editoris Studios; Pty Studios (Panama)
- Genre: Salsa; jazz; swing
- Length: 44:53
- Language: Spanish; English
- Label: Ruben Blades Productions
- Producer: Roberto Delgado

Rubén Blades with Roberto Delgado & Orquesta chronology
Medoro Madera (2018)	Salswing! (2021)	Salsa Plus! (2021)

Rubén Blades chronology
Paraíso Road Gang (2019)	Salswing! (2021)	Pasieros (2022)

Salswing! (stylized as SALSWING!) is the sixth studio album by the Panamian singer Rubén Blades and Roberto Delgado & Orquesta, released on April 16, 2021, through Rubén Blades Productions. It was produced by Roberto Delgado and features songs by Blades like "Paula C" as well as salsa songs and jazz standards such as "Pennies from Heaven" and "The Way You Look Tonight".

In addition to the album, two companion albums were released, Salsa Plus! on April 23, 2021, and Swing! on April 30, 2021, the former features mostly salsa songs with a few swing songs, while the latter contains jazz songs with some salsa songs, both albums are composed by songs from Salswing! with each of the albums focusing on the songs from its respective genre.

At the 22nd Annual Latin Grammy Awards, the album won Album of the Year, being the second time Blades and Delgado & Orquestra win the award after Salsa Big Band in 2017, it was also their third nomination for in the category together, additionally, Salsa Plus! won Best Salsa Album. Salswing! also won Best Tropical Latin Album at the 64th Annual Grammy Awards.

== Background ==
The project followed the previous collaborations of Blades with Roberto Delgado & Orquesta in the Grammy-winning album Salsa Big Band (2017) and Medoro Madera (2018), Salswing! features songs in Spanish and English combining the genres of salsa and swing, Blades explained in the album notes that with the album he wanted to further the connections between the two genres, citing as example of connections the numerous collaborations between American and Latin American musicians throughout the years like Mario Bauzá with Dizzy Gillespie and Machito with Charlie Parker, he wrote that "with this album I try to continue this relationship, proving that art does not have nationality but represents a spirit that transcends races, geographies and languages", he continued by saying that one of his goals with the album was to "eliminate the stereotype that affirms that we are conditioned to only exist artistically within specific boundaries according to our nationality", hence the collaboration with a Panamanian band as a Panamanian himself to explore genres from different parts of Latin America and United States.

Prior to the release of the album, Carlos Pérez Bidó, a member of the orchestra who features in the album playing the timbales and drums, died, the album was dedicated to him.

== Repertoire and recording ==
The album is composed by eleven tracks ranging from compositions by Blades to jazz and salsa standards, the album starts with "Paula C" and ends with "Tambó", both written by Blades, the former was released in 1978 while the latter was written in 1977 and recorded alongside Willie Colón the following year. The other songs in the album written by Blades are "Ya No Me Duele", written by Jeremy Bosch and later modified by Blades, "Canto Niche", recorded in the seventees with Ray Barretto and originally released under the title "Canto Abacuá", and "Contrabando", recorded in the eightees with the band Son del Solar and also featured in his 1988 album Antecedente. The album contains the instrumental jazz "Do I Hear Four?", composed by Tom Kubis alongside the swing standards "Pennies from Heaven", written in 1936 by Arthur Johnston and Johnny Burke and first popularized by Bing Crosby, "Watch What Happens", originally composed by Jacques Demy, Michel Legrand and Norman Gimbel for the 1964 French musical film The Umbrellas of Cherbourg, and "The Way You Look Tonight", written by Dorothy Fields and Jerome Kern and first performed by Fred Astaire in the 1936 film Swing Time. The salsa songs include the instrumental mambo "Mambo Gil", written by Gilberto López and recorded by Tito Puente, and "Cobarde" by Ray Heredia. The Venezuela Strings Recording Ensemble features in the songs "The Way You Look Tonight" and "Paula C".

All of songs from the album were recorded at Editoris Studios in Panama with the exception of "The Way You Look Tonight" and "Cobarde", which were recorded at Pty Studios by Ignacio Molino and Pablo Governatori, also in Panama, the strings sections by the Venezuela Strings Recording Ensemble were recording at Caña Loca Recording Studios at San Cristóbal, Venezuela, the vocals were recorded at Flux Studios in New York City by Molino, Daniel Sanint and Pablo Morales, the album was mixed by Roberto Delgado and Oscar Marín at Prim Valls in Paso Ancho-Chiriquí, Panama and Arenas Music Studios in San José, Costa Rica, and was mastered by Daniel Ovie in Buenos Aires, Argentina.

== Critical reception ==
Professional ratings
Review scores
Source	Rating
All About Jazz	4.5/5 stars
PopMatters	8/10

Marty Lipp from PopMatters rated the album an eight out of ten writing that "instead of doing a greatest hits album or issuing a political call to arms in our turbulent times, Blades has released a celebratory album whose aim is to get listeners moving and put smiles on their faces (with an ancillary goal of shaking up preconceptions about the separation between genres)", he also commented that "as it does throughout the album, the orchestra proves itself inventive and constantly interesting". Writing for All About Jazz, Jim Trageser gave the album four and a half stars out of five calling the album "one of the best big band swing albums in recent memory", adding that "on Salswing! Blades and Delgado capture about as broad a swath of Big Band Era music as any band yet assembled". Elias Leight from Rolling Stone highlighted the song "Tambó", the last track of the album, calling it "ferocious" as well as the best in the album.

== Track listing ==
All tracks were produced by Roberto Delgado.

Salswing! track listing
No.	Title	Writer(s)	Length
1.	"Paula C."	Rubén Blades	5:36
2.	"Pennies from Heaven"	Arthur Johnston; Johnny Burke	3:39
3.	"Mambo Gil"	Gilbert Lopez	3:12
4.	"Ya No Me Duele"	Blades; Jeremy Bosch	4:32
5.	"Watch What Happens"	Jacques Demy; Michel Legrand; Norman Gimbel	2:13
6.	"Cobarde"	Ray Heredia	3:50
7.	"Do I Hear Four?"	Tom Kubis	3:42
8.	"Canto Niche"	Blades	4:32
9.	"The Way You Look Tonight"	Dorothy Fields; Jerome Kern	3:37
10.	"Contrabando"	Blades	5:42
11.	"Tambó"	Blades	4:14
Total length:			44:53

Salsa Plus! track listing
No.	Title	Writer(s)	Length
1.	"Paula C."	Rubén Blades	5:36
2.	"Contrabando"	Blades	5:42
3.	"Mambo Gil"	Gilbert Lopez	3:12
4.	"Tambó"	Blades	4:14
5.	"Ya No Me Duele"	Blades; Jeremy Bosch	4:32
6.	"Canto Niche"	Blades	4:32
7.	"Do I Hear Four?"	Tom Kubis	3:42
8.	"Cobarde"	Ray Heredia	3:50
Total length:			35:23

Swing! track listing
No.	Title	Writer(s)	Length
1.	"Pennies from Heaven"	Arthur Johnston; Johnny Burke	3:39
2.	"Ya No Me Duele"	Rubén Blades; Jeremy Bosch	4:32
3.	"Do I Hear Four?"	Tom Kubis	3:42
4.	"Paula C."	Blades	5:36
5.	"Watch What Happens"	Jacques Demy; Michel Legrand; Norman Gimbel	2:13
6.	"Mambo Gil"	Gilbert Lopez	3:12
7.	"The Way You Look Tonight"	Dorothy Fields; Jerome Kern	3:37
8.	"Cobarde"	Ray Heredia	3:50
Total length:			30:35

== Credits and personnel ==
=== Rubén Blades and Roberto Delgado & Orquesta ===
- Rubén Blades – lead performer, backing vocals
- Roberto Delgado – double-bass, electric bass, backing vocals
- Ademír Berrocal – congas, drums
- Juan Berna – piano
- Dario Boente – piano
- Raúl Rivera – bongó, campana
- Carlos Pérez Bidó – timbales, drums
- Juan Carlos "Wichy" López – trumpet
- Alejandro "Chichisín" Castillo – trumpet, trombone, baritone saxophone
- Francisco Delvecchio – trombone
- Avenicio Nuñez – trombone
- Carlos Ubarte – flute, saxophone
- Carlos Agrazal – alto saxophone
- Ivan Navarro – tenor saxophone
- Luis Carlos Pérez – tenor saxophone

=== Venezuela Strings Recording Ensemble ===
- Raniero Palm – conductor
- Jesús David Medina – conductor, violin, viola
- Ornella Hernández – violin, viola
- Daniela Valentina Pérez – violin
- Alejandra Carrillo – violin
- Lina Cáceres – viola
- Atamaica Ruiz – cello
- Yosmari Rodríguez – cello
- Adelis Gudiño – cello
- Maycol Chacón – cello
- Gabriel Delgado – cello
- Jhovanna Acosta – cello

=== Technical ===
- Rubén Blades – executive producer
- Roberto Delgado – producer, arranger, mixer
- Oscar Marín – recording engineer, mixer
- Ignacio Molino – recording engineer (tracks 6, 9)
- Pablo Governatori – recording engineer (tracks 6, 9)
- Marcos Marín – assistant engineer
- Juan Carlos García De Paredes – assistant engineer
- Álvaro Chávez – assistant engineer
- Daniel Sanint – assistant engineer
- Pablo Morales – assistant engineer
- Daniel Ovie – mastering
- Luis Carlos Garcia – photography
- Orosmán de la Guardia – graphic design
