= Obras Son Amores =

Studio album by Antonio Carmona
- Released: March 31, 2017
- Genre: Pop; flamenco
- Length: 40:36
- Language: Spanish
- Label: UMLE
- Producer: Daniel García Diego; Antonio Carmona

Antonio Carmona chronology
De Noche (2011)	Obras Son Amores (2017)

Singles from Obras Son Amores
- 1. "Mencanta" Released: March 10, 2017; 2. "Dale Luz" Released: 2017; 3. "Camamasi" Released: 2017

Obras Son Amores is the third studio album by Spanish singer Antonio Carmona. It was released on March 31, 2017, through Universal Music Latin Entertainment. Carmona spent five years working with different artists on songs for the album. Alex Cuba, Claudia Brant, Juanes, Luis Enrique Mejía, and Alejandro Sanz, are some of the artists he collaborated with.

Obras Son Amores received favorable reviews from music critics, one of whom praised Carmona over his inspiration for the recording, while another named the album a "gift for the senses". It debuted at number three on the Top 100 Albums chart in Spain, while received a nomination for Album of the Year at the 18th Annual Latin Grammy Awards. For promotion, the singles "Mencanta", "Dale Luz" and "Camamasi" were released in 2017.

== Background and recording ==
Following his departure from Spanish band Ketama, Carmona released two studio albums, Vengo Venenoso (2006) and De Noche (2011). Carmona spent five years up to 2017 working with other artists for the songs to be included on his third album, "I wanted to work with performers I admire, and create true reciprocal acts of love," the singer said to Aire Flamenco. He decided to title the album Obras Son Amores, being inspired by a refrain attributed to Teresa of Ávila: "Obras son amores y no buenas razones" ("Works are loves and not good reasons"). The album is produced by Carmona alongside Daniel García Diego, and recorded in Madrid and Cádiz, both of Spain, and Miami, of the United States. Carmona co-wrote all the songs, with the exception of "La Higuera", written solely by him.

== Music and lyrics ==
Obras Son Amores includes eleven tracks, in the genres of pop and flamenco. "Dale Luz" features singer-songwriter Alejandro Sanz, whom Carmona called "a magician", saying "he [Sanz] knows how to fit the lyrics, give meaning and form to the whole song. He is an alchemist warlock". "Mencanta" is a rumba and a tribute to Carmona's father, Juan Habichuela, which was co-written by the singer's nephew Juan Carmona. The song was finished the day Habichuela died, as Antonio Carmona recalled: "My father waited for me. That day I still had three sentences left to finish it. I went to the studio, finished the three sentences, recorded the song, returned, and an hour later, he died. My dad waited for me and gave me his last breath and the last thing he said was my name." "Así (Gota a Gota)" is a ballad written with Venezuelan artist Fernando Osorio. About the collaboration, Carmona said: "I met Fernando in Miami. I am a fan of is music and he knew all of my work."

"El Amor Se Fue" takes inspiration from the musical career of Ray Heredia. For the song "Camamasi", Carmona invents a new word for the title, wanting to create a "transoceanic anthem" with Pablo Rosenberg and Claudia Brant, whom the singer worked with via Skype. Carmona composed "La Razón de Mi Existir" with Colombian singer Juanes. Of the collaboration, Carmona stated: "He [Juanes] sent me a song that drew more of his personality and style, which are very defined and I turned it to 'rumba' with a choir at the end of it in a way that fits more with me." "Porque Tú Me Amas" features writing and guitar from singer-songwriter Alex Cuba. The singer met Cuba in Miami through a mutual friend. The track "La Higuera" takes inspiration from Carmona's parents' relationship and the city of Marbella. "Gitana Tú" was written by him with Nicaraguan performer Luis Enrique Mejía, forming a union between "flamenco and the Caribbean". The lyrics of the closing track, "Vida", allude to ill people living to the fullest, because "since childhood we are taught to live but not to die", Carmona declared.

== Release and reception ==
Obras Son Amores was released on March 31, 2017 by Carmona's record label Universal Music Latin Entertainment. "Mencanta", which features Juan Carmona, was released as the lead single on March 10, 2017. "Dale Luz" and "Camamasi" were released as the second and third singles from Obras Son Amores. Mariano Jesús Camacho of Vavel recognized the "presence" of Habichuela on the album "as a fundamental pillar of a work that instead of going through the black sorrow, it does so from the six strings of memory and a positivity absolutely full of light". Santiago Alcanda of Aire Flamenco stated that it was "the best repertoire that Antonio has ever recorded". Pilar Azkárate of El Corte Inglés named the album a "gift for the senses". Obras Son Amores received a nomination for Album of the Year at the 18th Annual Latin Grammy Awards, ultimately losing to Salsa Big Band (2017) by Panamanian artists Rubén Blades and Roberto Delgado & Orquesta. Commercially, the album debuted at number three on the Top 100 Albums chart for Spain on the week of April 21, 2017, behind Lo Niego Todo (2017) by Spanish artist Joaquín Sabina and ÷ (2017) by English performer Ed Sheeran at number two and one, respectively; however, it was the highest debut of the week.

== Track listing ==
Credits adapted from AllMusic. All tracks produced by Daniel García Diego and Antonio Carmona.

Obras Son Amores tracklisting
No.	Title	Writer(s)	Length
1.	"Dale Luz"	Antonio Carmona; Alejandro Sanz	3:16
2.	"Mencanta" (featuring Juan Carmona)	A. Carmona; Juan Carmona	3:41
3.	"Así (Gota a Gota)"	A. Carmona; Fernando Osorio	3:41
4.	"El Amor Se Fue"	A. Carmona; Lucia Carmona; Marina Carmona	3:37
5.	"Camamasi"	Claudia Brant; A. Carmona; Pablo Rosenberg	4:33
6.	"La Razón de Mi Existir"	Carmona; Juanes	3:21
7.	"Porque Tú Me Amas"	Carmona; Alex Cuba	3:12
8.	"La Higuera"	Carmona	4:29
9.	"Qué No Daría Yo"	Brant; Carmona	3:32
10.	"Gitana Tú"	Carmona; Luis Enrique Mejía	2:55
11.	"Vida"	Carmona; Luis Pastor	4:19

== Charts ==
=== Weekly charts ===
Weekly chart performance for Obras Son Amores
Chart (2017)	Peak position
Spanish Albums (Promusicae)	3

=== Year-end charts ===
Year-end chart performance for Obras Son Amores
Chart (2017)	Position
Spanish Albums (PROMUSICAE)	89
