= Whine Up (Nicky Jam song) =

Single by Nicky Jam featuring Anuel AA

from the album Íntimo
- Released: October 29, 2019
- Recorded: 2019
- Genre: Reggaeton
- Length: 3:35
- Label: La Industria Inc, Sony Music Latin
- Songwriter: Nick Rivera Caminero · Emmanuel Gazmey Santiago · Cristhian Mena · Juan Diego Medina Vélez · Rafael Regginalds Aponte · René Dasilva
- Producer: Saga White Black · Reggi El Auténtico · Oliver Ontañon

Nicky Jam singles chronology
"Bota fuego" (2019)	"Whine Up" (2019)	"Que le dé (Remix)" (2019)

"Whine Up" is a song by American reggaeton singer Nicky Jam, in collaboration with Puerto Rican rapper Anuel AA. It was released on October 29, 2019, by La Industria Inc and distributed by Sony Music Latin as the fourth single from Nicky Jam's album Íntimo.

== Commercial reception ==
In addition to appearing on major Billboard charts, the song garnered more than 200 million streams on Spotify.

== Music video ==
A music video was filmed in Miami and directed by Mike Ho. Both artists appear surrounded by a crowd of dancers showcasing their skills. The video surpassed 3 million views within the first 24 hours.

== Charts ==
Chart (2019–2020)	Peak position
Argentina Hot 100 (Billboard)	18
Mexico Español Airplay	17
US Hot Latin Songs (Billboard)	17
US Latin Pop Airplay (Billboard)	17
US Latin Rhythm Airplay (Billboard)	20

== Certifications ==
Country	Certifying body	Certification	Certified units	Ref
Mexico	AMPROFON	Platinum + Gold	90,000	
