= 18th Annual Latin Grammy Awards =

Music awards presented Nov 2017

18th Latin Grammy Awards
- Date: November 16, 2017
- Venue: MGM Grand Garden Arena, Paradise, Nevada
- Hosted by: Roselyn Sanchez and Jaime Camil

Highlights
- Most awards: Luis Fonsi & Daddy Yankee (4 each)
- Most nominations: Residente (9)
- Person of the Year: Alejandro Sanz

Television/radio coverage
- Network: Univision

The 18th Annual Latin Grammy Awards was held on November 16, 2017, at the MGM Grand Garden Arena in Las Vegas. It was broadcast on Univision at 8PM ET\PT. This marked the tenth year Las Vegas hosts the Latin Grammy Awards and also marked the telecasts return to the MGM Grand Garden Arena.

== Performers ==
- Residente – "Hijos del Cañaveral"
- Alejandro Fernández – "Quiero Que Vuelvas" and "México Lindo y Querido"
- Natalia Lafourcade with Carlos Rivera, Flor de Toloache and Los Macorinos – "Mexicana Hermosa" and "Tú Si Sabes Quererme"
- Maluma – "Felices los 4"
- Alejandro Sanz – "Cuando Nadie Me Ve", "No Es Lo Mismo" and "Corazón Partío"
- J Balvin with Bad Bunny, French Montana and Steve Aoki – "Si Tu Novio Te Deja Sola", "Unforgettable" and "Mi Gente"
- Rubén Blades – "Arayue"
- Juanes with Logic and Alessia Cara – "Es Tarde" and "1-800-273-8255"
- CNCO – "Reggaetón Lento (Bailemos)"
- Banda El Recodo and Lila Downs – "En mi Viejo San Juan"
- Nicky Jam – "El Amante"
- Sebastián Yatra and Carlos Vives – "Devuélveme El Corazón" and "Robarte un Beso"
- Ha*Ash and Grupo Bronco – "Adoro"
- Mon Laferte – "Amárrame"
- Vicente García – "Carmesí" / Danay Suárez – "Yo Aprendí" / Sofía Reyes – "Llegaste Tú"
- Luis Fonsi with Bomba Estéreo, Victor Manuelle and Diplo – "Despacito"

== Postponement of Nominations Announcement ==
Nominations were to be announced on September 20, 2017. However, due to the earthquake in Mexico which occurred a previous day, as well as other natural disasters that affected Spanish-speaking communities, the Latin Recording Academy did not announce the nominations until Tuesday, September 26.

This marked the second time when the Latin Recording Academy had to delay or cancel one of their signature events. In 2001, the Latin Recording Academy was forced to cancel the 2nd Annual Latin Grammy Awards due to the September 11 attacks. Instead, the winners of those awards were announced at a press conference the following month. The 18th Annual Latin Grammy Awards were still held on time, on November 16, 2017, despite the delay of the announcement of the nominations.

== Nominees and winners ==
The following is the list of nominees.

=== General ===
Record of the Year

Luis Fonsi featuring Daddy Yankee — "Despacito"

- Rubén Blades — "La flor de la canela"
- Jorge Drexler — "El Surco"
- Alejandro Fernández — "Quiero Que Vuelvas"
- Juanes featuring Kali Uchis — "El Ratico"
- Mon Laferte featuring Juanes — "Amárrame"
- Maluma — "Felices los 4"
- Ricky Martin featuring Maluma — "Vente Pa' Ca"
- Residente — "Guerra"
- Shakira featuring Maluma — "Chantaje"

Album of the Year

Rubén Blades with Roberto Delgado & Orquesta — Salsa Big Band

- Antonio Carmona — Obras Son Amores
- Vicente García — A La Mar
- Nicky Jam — Fénix
- Juanes — Mis Planes Son Amarte
- Mon Laferte — La Trenza
- Natalia Lafourcade — Musas
- Residente — Residente
- Shakira — El Dorado
- Danay Suárez — Palabras Manuales

Song of the Year

Daddy Yankee, Erika Ender and Luis Fonsi — "Despacito" (Luis Fonsi featuring Daddy Yankee)

- Mon Laferte — "Amárrame" (Mon Laferte featuring Juanes)
- Kevin Mauricio Jiménez Londoño, Bryan Snaider Lezcano Chaverra, Joel Antonio López Castro, Maluma and Shakira — "Chantaje" (Shakira featuring Maluma)
- Descemer Bueno and Melendi — "Desde Que Estamos Juntos" (Melendi)
- Ricardo Arjona — "Ella"
- Mario Cáceres, Kevin Mauricio Jiménez Londoño, Maluma, Servando Primera, Stiven Rojas and Bryan Snaider Lezcano Chaverra — "Felices los 4" (Maluma)
- Residente and Jeff Trooko — "Guerra" (Residente)
- Diana Fuentes and Tommy Torres — "La Fortuna"
- Natalia Lafourcade — "Tú Sí Sabes Quererme"
- Nermin Harambasic, Maluma, Ricky Martin, Mauricio Montaner, Ricky Montaner, Lars Pedersen, Carl Ryden, Justin Stein, Ronny Vidar Svendsen and Anne Judith Stokke Wik — "Vente Pa' Ca" (Ricky Martin featuring Maluma)

Best New Artist

Vicente García

- Paula Arenas
- CNCO
- Martina La Peligrosa
- Mau y Ricky
- Rawayana
- Sofía Reyes
- Rosalía
- Danay Suárez
- Sebastián Yatra

=== Pop ===
Best Contemporary Pop Vocal Album

Shakira — El Dorado

- David Bisbal — Hijos del Mar
- Alejandro Fernández — Rompiendo Fronteras
- Camila Luna — Flora y Faῦna
- Sebastián Yatra — Extended Play Yatra

Best Traditional Pop Vocal Album

Lila Downs — Salón, Lágrimas y Deseo

- Franco De Vita — Libre
- Juan Gabriel — Vestido de Etiqueta por Eduardo Magallanes
- Ednita Nazario — Una Vida
- Yordano — El Tren de los Regresos

=== Urban ===
Best Urban Fusion/Performance

Luis Fonsi and Daddy Yankee featuring Justin Bieber — "Despacito" (Remix)

- J Balvin featuring Bad Bunny — "Si Tu Novio Te Deja Sola"
- Nicky Jam — "El Amante"
- Residente — "Dagombas En Tamale"
- Shakira featuring Maluma — "Chantaje"

Best Urban Music Album

Residente — Residente

- J Álvarez — Big Yauran
- Kase.O — El Círculo
- Arianna Puello — Rap Komunion
- Rael — Coisas Do Meu Imaginário

Best Urban Song

Rafael Arcaute, Igor Koshkendey and Residente — "Somos Anormales" (Residente)

- Emicida and Rael — "A Chapa É Quente!" (Língua Franca)
- Luis Díaz, Alejandro Estrada, Bruno Og and Jonathan Torres — "Coqueta" (Ghetto Kids)
- Nicky Jam, Juan Diego Medina Vélez and Cristhian Mena — "El Amante" (Nicky Jam)
- J Balvin, Camila Cabello, Phillip Kembo, Johnny Michell, Pitbull, Rosina "Soaky Siren" Russell, Jamie Sanderson and Tinashe "T-Collar" Sibanda — "Hey Ma (Spanish version)" (Pitbull and J Balvin featuring Camila Cabello)
- Lápiz Consciente and Vico C — "Papa"

=== Rock ===
Best Rock Album

Diamante Eléctrico — La Gran Oscilación

- Daniel Cadena — Mutante
- De la Tierra — II
- Eruca Sativa — Barro y Fauna
- Utopians — Todos Nuestros Átomos

Best Pop/Rock Album

Juanes — Mis Planes Son Amarte

- Mikel Erentxun — El Hombre Sin Sombra
- Jarabe de Palo — 50 Palos
- Miranda! — Fuerte
- Joaquín Sabina — Lo Niego Todo

Best Rock Song

Diamante Eléctrico — "Déjala Rodar" (tie) Andrés Calamaro — "La Noche" (tie)

- Eruca Sativa — "Armas Gemelas"
- Rafa Bonilla and Jorge Holguín "Pyngwi" — "Días Contados" (Rafa Bonilla)
- Emiliano Brancciari — "Para Cuando Me Muera" (No Te Va Gustar)
- Enrique Rangel — "Que No" (Café Tacvba)

=== Alternative ===
Best Alternative Music Album

Café Tacvba — Jei Beibi

- El Cuarteto de Nos — Apocalipsis Zombi
- Mon Laferte — La Trenza
- Sig Ragga — La Promesa de Thamar
- Danay Suárez — Palabras Manuales

Best Alternative Song

Mon Laferte — "Amárrame" (Mon Laferte featuring Juanes)

- Sig Ragga — "Antonia"
- Robert Musso — "Apocalipsis Zombi" (El Cuarteto de Nos)
- Rafael Arcaute and Residente — "Apocaliptico" (Residente)
- Stephen Marley and Danay Suárez — "Integridad" (Danay Suárez)

=== Tropical ===
Best Salsa Album

Rubén Blades and Roberto Delgado & Orquesta — Salsa Big Band

- Alberto Barros — Tributo a La Salsa Colombiana 7
- Juan Pablo Díaz — Fase Dos
- Alain Pérez — ADN
- Various Artists / Isidro Infante (producer) — Isidro Infante Presenta: Cuba y Puerto Rico, Un Abrazo Musical Salsero

Best Cumbia/Vallenato Album

Jorge Celedón and Sergio Luis Rodríguez — Ni Un Paso Atrás

- Silvestre Dangond — Gente Valiente
- El Gran Martín Elías and Rolando Ochoa — Sin Límites
- Juventino Ojito and Su Son Mocaná — Cumbia Del Río Magdalena
- Jorge Oñate and Alvaro López — Patrimonio Cultural

Best Contemporary Tropical Album

Guaco — Bidimensional

- Lucas Arnau — Teatro
- Gaitanes — La Parranda De Gaitanes
- Frank Reyes — Devuélveme Mi Libertad
- Prince Royce — FIVE

Best Traditional Tropical Album

Jon Secada featuring The Charlie Sepúlveda Big Band — To Beny Moré with Love

- Albita — Albita
- El Septeto Santiaguero — Raíz
- La Colmenita (Various Artists) — El Añejo Jardín
- Babalú Quinteto — Cuba Sobre Cuerdas

Best Tropical Fusion Album

Olga Tañón — Olga Tañón y Punto.

- Colectro — Coletera
- Gabriel — Contra Corriente
- Adriana Lucía — Porrock
- Salsangroove — Salsangroove

Best Tropical Song

Vicente García — "Bachata en Kingston"

- Raul del Sol and Jorge Luis Piloto — "Cuando Beso Tu Boca" (Mojito Lite)
- Manny Cruz, Prince Royce, Daniel Santacruz and Shakira — "Deja Vu" (Prince Royce featuring Shakira)
- Medardo Rovayo — "Dejé de Amar" (Felipe Muñiz featuring Marc Anthony)
- Residente — "Hijos del Cañaveral"

=== Songwriter ===
Best Songwriting Album

Vicente García — A La Mar

- Alex Cuba — Lo Único Constante
- Santiago Cruz — Trenes, Aviones y Viajes Interplanetarios
- Erika Ender — Tatuajes
- Debi Nova — Gran Ciudad

=== Regional Mexican ===
Best Ranchera/Mariachi Music Album

Flor de Toloache — Las Caras Lindas

- Majida Issa — Pero No Llorando - Nocturna
- Mariachi Herencia de México — Nuestra Herencia
- Mariachi Imperial Azteca — Aún Estoy de Pie
- Mariachi Oro de América — 36 Aniversario Mariachi Oro de América

Best Banda Album

Banda El Recodo de Cruz Lizárraga — Ayer y Hoy

- El Chapo de Sinaloa — Mis Decretos
- Maribel Guardia — Besos Callejeros
- La Original Banda El Limón de Salvador Lizárraga — El Mayor de Mis Antojos
- Lalo Mora — Un Millón de Primaveras

Best Norteño Music Album

Los Palominos — Piénsalo

- Leonardo Aguilar — Gallo Fino
- Los Huracanes del Norte — Alma Bohemia
- Los Invasores de Nuevo León — No. 50
- Los Tercos — Los Tercos

Best Regional Mexican Song

Juan Treviño — "Siempre Es Así" (Juan Treviño featuring AJ Castillo)

- Espinoza Paz — "Compromiso Descartado" (Leonardo Aguilar)
- Horacio Palencia — "Ganas de Volver"
- Raúl Jiménez E. and Chucho Rincón — "Sentimiento Emborrachado" (Santiago Arroyo)
- Edgar Barrera, Martín Castro Ortega and Alfonso Lizárraga — "Vale la Pena" (Banda El Recodo de Cruz Lizárraga)

=== Instrumental ===
Best Instrumental Album

Michel Camilo and Tomatito — Spain Forever

- Cesar Camargo Mariano featuring Rudiger Liebermann, Walter Seyfarth and Benoit Fromanger — Joined
- Gustavo Casenave — Conversations with Vladimir Stowe
- Daniel Minimalia — Origen
- Luis Salinas — El Tren

=== Traditional ===
Best Folk Album

Natalia Lafourcade — Musas)

- Yuvisney Aguilar and Afrocuban Jazz Quartet — Piango, Piango
- Magín Díaz — El Orisha de la Rosa
- Quinteto Leopoldo Federico — Pa' Qué Más
- Edward Ramírez and Rafa Pino — El Tuyero Ilustrado

Best Tango Album

Fernando Otero — Solo Buenos Aires

- El Arranque — 20 Años - En Vivo En Café Vinilo
- Patricia Malanca — Bucles
- Rodolfo Mederos — 13
- Tango Orchestra — Mixturas

Best Flamenco Music Album

Vicente Amigo — Memoria de Los Sentidos

- Diego Guerrero — Vengo Caminando
- Las Migas — Vente Conmigo
- José Mijita — Se Llama Flamenco
- La Macanita and Manuel Valencia — Directo en El Círculo Flamenco de Madrid

=== Jazz ===
Best Latin Jazz Album

Eliane Elias — Dance of Time

- Antonio Adolfo — Hybrido / From Rio To Wayne Shorter
- Oskar Cartaya — Bajo Mundo
- Charlie Sepúlveda and The Turnaround — Mr. EP - A Tribute to Eddie Palmieri
- Miguel Zenón — Típico

=== Portuguese language ===
Best Contemporary Pop Album

Tiago Iorc — Troco Likes Ao Vivo: Um Filme de Tiago Iorc

- Anavitória — Anavitória
- Mano Brown — Boogie Naipe
- Jamz — Tudo nosso
- Ludmilla — A Danada sou eu

Best Rock Album or Alternative Music

Nando Reis — Jardim-Pomar

- The Baggios — Brutown
- Blitz — Aventuras II
- Curumim — Boca
- Metá Metá — MM3

Best Samba/Pagode Album

Mart'nália — + Misturado

- Luciana Mello — Na luz do samba
- Diogo Nogueira — Alma brasileira
- Roberta Sá — Delírio no Circo
- Various Artists — Samba Book: Jorge Aragão

Best Brazilian Popular Music Album

Edu Lobo, Romero Lubambo, Mauro Senise — Dos Navegantes

- Alexandre Pires — DNA Musical
- Silva — Silva Canta Marisa
- António Zambujo — Até Pensei Que Fosse Minha
- Zanna — Zanna

Best Sertaneja Music Album

Daniel — Daniel

- Day & Lara — (...)
- Luan Santana — 1977
- Marília Mendonça — Realidade Ao Vivo em Manaus
- Simone & Simaria — Live

Best Brazilian Roots Music Album

Bruna Viola — Ao Vivo - Melodias Do Sertão

- Patrícia Bastos — Batom Bacaba
- Pinduca — No Embalo Do
- Trio Nordestino — Canta O Nordeste
- Yangos — Chamamé
- Various Artists — Ascensão

Best Song in Portuguese Language

Ana Caetano and Tiago Iorc, songwriters — "Trevo (Tu)" (Anavitória featuring Tiago Iorc)

- Marisa Monte, Silva and Lucas Silva, songwriters — "Noturna (Nada de Novo Na Noite)" (Silva featuring Marisa Monte)
- Cauique, Diogo Leite and Rodrigo Leite, songwriters — "Pé na Areia" (Diogo Nogueira)
- Nando Reis, songwriter — "Só Posso Dizer" (Nando Reis)
- Andrei Kozyreff, Juliana Strassacapa, Sebastián Piracés-Ugarte, Mateo Piracés-Ugarte and Rafael Gomes da Silva, songwriters — "Triste, Louca ou Má" (Francisco, el Hombre)

=== Classical ===
Best Classical Album

Eddie Mora directing The Orquesta Sinfónica Nacional de Costa Rica — Música De Compositores Costarricenses Vol. 2

- Nathalie Peña Comas — Alta Gracia
- Jordi Savall — Dixit Dominus: Vivaldi, Mozart, Handel
- Horacio Gutiérrez — Horacio Gutiérrez Plays Chopin & Schumann
- In-Hong Cha conducting The Orquesta Sinfónica de Venezuela — Textures from the North of South

Best Classical Contemporary Composition

Leo Brouwer — "Sonata del Decamerón Negro" (Mabel Millán)

- Manuel Tejada — "Ave María" (Nathalie Peña Comas)
- Hebert Vásquez — "Azucena" (Susan Narucki)
- Diego Schissi — "Nene" (Sibelius Piano Trio)
- Aurelio de la Vega — "Recordatio" (Anne Marie Ketchum)
- André Mehmari and Flavio Chamis — "Sonata For Viola and Piano" (André Mehmari and Tatjana Chamis)

=== Christian ===
Best Christian Album (Spanish Language)

Alex Campos — Momentos

- Barak — Generación Radical
- Gabriela Cartulano — Tu Amor
- Álvaro López and ResQBand — Sol Detente
- Jaci Velasquez — Confío

Best Christian Album (Portuguese Language)

Aline Barros — Acenda A Sua Luz

- Paulo César Baruk and Leandro Rodrigues — Piano e Voz, Amigos e Pertences 2
- Fernanda Brum — Ao Vivo Em Israel
- Padre Fábio de Melo — Clareou
- Bruna Karla — Incomparável
- Eli Soares — Memórias

=== Children's ===
Best Children's Album

Various Artists — Marc Anthony for Babies

- Mariana Baraj — ¡Churo!
- Cantajuego — ¡Viva Mi Planeta 2!
- Cepillín — Gracias
- Luis Pescetti — Queridos (En Vivo)
- Sophia — Aprendendo Ritmos da América

=== Recording Package field ===
Best Recording Package

- Carlos Dussán, Juliana Jaramillo, Juan Felipe Martínez and Claudio Roncoli — El Orisha de la Rosa (Magín Díaz)
- André Coelho and Mariana Hardy — Na Medida Do Impossível Ao Vivo No Inhotim (Fernanda Takai)
- Lia Cunha — Pirombeira (Pirombeira)
- Barão Di Sarno and Ciça Góes — Sol (Gustavo Galo)
- Fabio Prata — Três no Samba (André Mehmari, Eliane Faria and Gordinho do Surdo)

=== Production ===
Best Engineered Album

Josh Gudwin and Tom Coyne — Mis Planes Son Amarte (Juanes)

- Guillermo Bonetto, Nahuel Giganti, My-TBeats and Pedro Pearson — Alas Canciones (Los Cafres)
- Rodrigo de Castro Lopes, Pete Karam and Paul Blakemore — Dance of Time (Eliane Elias)
- Craig Parker Adams, Gabe Roth, Juan Pablo Berreondo and JJ Golden — Ilusión (Gaby Moreno)
- Moogie Canazio, Carlos De Andrade and Ricardo Dias — Zanna (Zanna)

Producer of the Year

Eduardo Cabra

- Eduardo Bergallo
- Moogie Canazio
- Hamilton de Holanda, Marcos Portinari, and Daniel Santiago
- Armando Manzanero

=== Music video ===
Best Short Form Music Video

Luis Fonsi featuring Daddy Yankee — "Despacito"

- Bomba Estéreo — "Soy Yo"
- Leiva — "Sincericido"
- Dani Martín — "Los Charcos"
- Residente with Soko — "Desencuentro"

Best Long Form Music Video

Natalia Lafourcade — Musas, El Documental

- Miguel Bosé — MTV Unplugged
- Juanes — Mis Planes Son Amarte
- Grupo Bronco — Primera Fila
- Guaco — Semblanza

== Multiple Nominations and Awards ==
The following received multiple nominations:

Nine nominations

- Residente

Seven nominations

- Maluma

Six nominations

- Shakira

Five nominations

- Juanes
- Mon Laferte

Four nominations

- Luis Fonsi
- Daddy Yankee
- Danay Suárez
- Natalia Lafourcade
- Nicky Jam
- Vicente García

Three nominations

- Rubén Blades

Two nominations

- Alejandro Fernández
- Anavitória
- Café Tacvba
- Cuarteto de Nos
- Diamante Eléctrico
- Erika Ender
- Eruca Sativa
- Guaco
- J Balvin
- Moogie Canazio
- Prince Royce
- Rael
- Ricky Martin
- Sebastián Yatra
- Sig Ragga

The following received multiple awards:

Four awards

- Luis Fonsi
- Daddy Yankee

Three awards

- Vicente García

Two awards

- Rubén Blades
- Diamante Eléctrico
- Natalia Lafourcade
- Residente
- Juanes
