= Raniero Palm =

Venezuelan audio engineer and music producer

- Palm at the 27th Annual Latin Grammy Awards, 2026

Background information
- Born: Raniero Alberto Palm Paolini; June 15, 1983 (age 43); Táchira, Venezuela
- Genres: Latin, Pop, Rock, Children's music, Tango, Salsa, Urban, Instrumental, Classical
- Occupations: Record producer, recording engineer
- Years active: 2009–present

Raniero Palm is a Latin Grammy-winning audio engineer, music producer, arranger and string conductor of Italian descent.

== Career ==
In 2006, he obtained his bachelor's degree in music at the Universidad Pedagógica Experimental Libertador.

In 2009, he founded the trademark and pop rock band Statika, ranking at number one on the General list of the Record Report, a Venezuelan radio list, television and media. With Statika he went on several tours.

In 2022, he was recognized along with other musicians again at the Latin Grammy Awards, this time, for the album El Renacimiento by Carla Morrison and her song "Encontrarme", where he served as Recording Engineer and String Conductor, and in the Best Instrumental Music Album category he repeated with two albums: Ofrenda by the group Raíces de Venezuela and by Gerry Weil Sinfónico. At the Dove Awards, a nomination in the Spanish album of the year category for his work as a recording engineer on Ricardo Montaner's Fe. Likewise, he would obtain for the first time an award at the Pepsi Music Awards of Venezuela for his work on the album Ofrenda by the group Raíces de Venezuela.

In 2023, he was in charge of the soundtrack for the Venezuelan short film Indignos, together with Gabriel Lococo and Venezuela Ensemble Strings. Also, he directed Felipe Peláez's Tour Sinfónico with El Sistema.

In 2024, Raniero was awarded the Grammy Award in the category of Best Children's Music Album for We Grow Together by Colombian duo 123 Andrés.

== Credits ==
In his career, Raniero has performed the work of arranger, producer, recording engineer, musician, director of string instruments, among other functions within some of the albums detailed below:

- 2020: Terra - Daniel Minimalia
- 2022: Nacho Sinfónico - Nacho

== Awards ==
=== Grammy Awards ===
- 2022 Best Latin Tropical Album / SALSWING! - Rubén Blades & Roberto Delgado y Su Orquesta (Winners)
- 2024 Best Children's Album / We Grow Together, Preschool Songs - 123 Andrés (Winners)

=== Latin Grammy Awards ===
- 2016 Best Children's Album / Arriba Abajo - 123 Andrés (Winners)
- 2017 Best Solo Tango Album Buenos Aires - Fernando Otero (Winners)
- 2020 Best Instrumental Album / Terra - Daniel Minimalia (Winners)
- 2020 Best Christian Album in Spanish / Soldados – Alex Campos (Winners)
- 2021 Recording of the Year / Dios Así Lo Quiso – Ricardo Montaner & Juan Luis Guerra (Nominated)
- 2021 Best Tropical Song / Dios Así lo Quiso – Ricardo Montaner & Juan Luis Guerra (Winners)
- 2021 Best Salsa Album Salsa Plus - Rubén Blades (Winners)
- 2022 Best Gerry Weil Symphonic Instrumental Music Album – Gerry Weil & Simón Bolívar Symphony Orchestra (Nominated)
- 2023 Album of the Year Play - Ricky Martin (Nominated)
- 2023 Best Christian Album in Spanish Vida – Alex Campos (Nominated)

==== Other recognitions ====
- Guinness Record: The Longest officially released song for “El Manifesto” by Henry G, 2017
