= Greatest Hits, Vol. 1 (Nicky Jam album) =

Compilation album by Nicky Jam
- Released: November 4, 2014
- Genre: Reggaeton
- Label: La Industria Inc.; Codiscos S.A.S.
- Producer: Saga WhiteBlack; Super Yei; Hi-Flow; Pipe Florez; Denni Way; Nacho "El De La Pauta"; Radikal; Khris "The Producer"; DJ Luian; AG "La Maldita Voz"

Nicky Jam chronology
Nicky Jam Hits (2014)	Greatest Hits, Vol. 1 (2014)	Fénix (2017)

Greatest Hits, Vol. 1 is a compilation album by American singer Nicky Jam released on November 4, 2014. This album contains eight songs that were previously released in Nicky Jam Hits, a remix of the song "Voy a Beber" with Ñejo and a new song, "Si Tú No Estás" with De La Ghetto.

== Track listing ==
No.	Title	Length
1.	"Si Tú No Estás" (featuring De La Ghetto)	3:38
2.	"Travesuras"	3:15
3.	"Voy a Beber"	3:32
4.	"Piensas en Mí"	4:15
5.	"Curiosidad"	3:24
6.	"Juegos Prohibidos"	3:12
7.	"Tu Primera Vez"	2:58
8.	"Travesuras (Remix)" (featuring J Balvin, Zion, Arcángel and De La Ghetto)	4:46
9.	"Piensas en Mí (Remix)" (featuring Yelsid, Luigi 21 Plus and Jory)	4:46
10.	"Voy a Beber (Remix)" (featuring Ñejo)	3:44
Total length:		37:30

== Charts ==
=== Weekly charts ===
Chart (2015–2016)	Peak position
US Top Latin Albums (Billboard)	18

=== Year-end charts ===
Chart (2016)	Position
US Top Latin Albums (Billboard)	65
