= Travesuras =

2014 song by Nicky Jam

Single by Nicky Jam

from the album Nicky Jam Hits and Greatest Hits, Vol. 1
- Language: Spanish
- Released: January 27, 2014
- Genre: Reggaeton; Latin pop
- Length: 3:15
- Label: Sony Latin; RCA
- Songwriter: Nick Rivera Caminero

Nicky Jam singles chronology
"Suele Suceder" (2014)	"Travesuras" (2014)	"El Perdón" (2015)

Music video
- "Travesuras" on YouTube

"Travesuras" (transl. "Mischief") is a song by American singer Nicky Jam, taken from the compilation albums Nicky Jam Hits and Greatest Hits, Vol. 1. It was released as the album's lead single on January 27, 2014 through Sony Music Latin and RCA Records. The song was commercially successful throughout countries in Latin America, reaching the top spot on the charts in Colombia and peaking within the top five on the Billboard Hot Latin Songs chart. The single is Jam's first song to reach the top ten on the Billboard Hot Latin Songs chart. A remix version was released on June 21, 2014 with Arcángel and J Balvin featuring Zion and De la Ghetto.

== Music video ==
The music video for "Travesuras" was released on July 3, 2014 on Nicky Jam's YouTube account. It was shot in Medellín, Colombia and currently exceeds 1 billion views. In the video, Jam cares for a girl who wants to sell a luxury property. Parts of the video were recorded in the inside of the property and others on roads of the city where he drives a white Lamborghini Gallardo.

== Charts ==
=== Weekly charts ===
Chart (2014–15)	Peak position
Colombia (National-Report)	1
Italy (FIMI)	45
Romania (Airplay 100)	39
Spain (Promusicae)	3
US Hot Latin Songs (Billboard)	4
US Latin Airplay (Billboard)	13
US Latin Rhythm Airplay (Billboard)	2
US Latin Pop Airplay (Billboard)	10
US Tropical Airplay (Billboard)	17

=== Year-end charts ===
Chart (2014)	Position
Spain (PROMUSICAE)	8
US Hot Latin Songs (Billboard)	21

== Certifications ==
Region	Certification	Certified units/sales
Italy (FIMI)	2× Platinum	100,000^{‡}
Spain (Promusicae)	4× Platinum	160,000^{‡}
Spain (Promusicae) Streaming	Platinum	8,000,000^{†}
^{‡} Sales+streaming figures based on certification alone.^{†} Streaming-only figures based on certification alone.
