= Salón de la fama =

Remix album by Nicky Jam
- Released: July 1, 2003
- Genre: Reggaeton
- Label: White Lion; El Cartel
- Producer: DJ Urba; DJ Blass; DJ Rafi Mercenario; DJ Joe; DJ Flavor; DJ Krypy

Nicky Jam chronology
| Haciendo escante (2001) | Salón de la fama (2003) | Vida escante (2004) |

Singles from Salón de la fama
- 1. "Buscarte" Released: 2003

Salón de la fama ("Hall of Fame") is the first remix album by American singer Nicky Jam. It is an album of his greatest hit songs as well as several new tracks.

== Track listing ==
| No. | Title | Length |
|---|---|---|
| 1. | "Intro" | 2:01 |
| 2. | "La Vamos a Montar" | 3:57 |
| 3. | "Buscarte" (featuring Daddy Yankee) | 2:40 |
| 4. | "Si Tú Guayas" (featuring Plan B) | 3:08 |
| 5. | "Filoteao" | 3:57 |
| 6. | "Descontrol" | 2:44 |
| 7. | "Interlude" | 1:27 |
| 8. | "Tragatela" | 3:17 |
| 9. | "Y Las Gatas" | 2:29 |
| 10. | "Gatas En La Disco" | 2:27 |
| 11. | "Tienen El Control" | 2:58 |
| 12. | "Te Haces La Difícil" | 3:08 |
| 13. | "Mi Gente Tiene Que Bailar" | 2:29 |
| 14. | "Interlude" | 0:32 |
| 15. | "Se Te Acuerdas La Primera Vez" | 2:47 |
| 16. | "Yo No Sé Que Esperas Tú" | 2:18 |
| 17. | "Eres Tú" | 3:14 |
| 18. | "Outro" | 0:52 |
| Total length: | | 46:25 |

== Charts ==
| Chart (2003) | Peak position |
|---|---|
| US Top Latin Albums (Billboard) | 69 |
