= Suele Suceder =

Single by Piso 21 featuring Nicky Jam

from the album Canciones Que Nos Marcaron
- Released: 7 April 2014
- Genre: Latin Pop; Reggaeton
- Length: 3:27
- Label: Star Arsis Entertainment Group
- Songwriters: Juan David Castaño; David Escobar Gallego; Juan David Huertas; Pablo Mejia; Nick Rivera Caminero; Jairo Fernandez

Piso 21 singles chronology
| "Dame de Tu Corazón" (2013) | "Suele Suceder" (2014) | "Quítale La Pena" (2015) |

Nicky Jam singles chronology
| "Gas Pela" (2008) | "Suele Suceder" (2014) | "Travesuras" (2014) |

Music video
- "Suele Suceder" on YouTube

"Suele Suceder" (transl. "Often happens") is a song by Colombian band Piso 21, featuring American singer Nicky Jam. It was released on 7 April 2014 by Star Arsis Entertainment Group as the second single from the band's first compilation album Canciones Que Nos Marcaron. The song was a commercial success in Latin America, especially in Colombia, where it reached the top 20 in the Colombian Monitor Latino charts. It also became the group's first charting single in the US Latin Billboard charts, where it peaked at number 29 on the Tropical Songs chart.

== Lyric video ==
The lyric video for "Suele Suceder" premiered on 7 April 2014 on Piso 21's YouTube account and has since been viewed over 3 million times.

== Music video ==
The music video for "Suele Suceder" premiered on 10 June 2014 on Piso 21's YouTube account. It features Olivia Aristizábal Echeverri, who was the delegate of the Antioquia Department in Miss Colombia 2011. The video was directed by Alejandro Jaimes and has been viewed over 150 million times.

== Track listing ==
Digital download
| No. | Title | Writer(s) | Length |
|---|---|---|---|
| 1. | "Suele Suceder" (featuring Nicky Jam) | Juan David Castaño; David Escobar Gallego; Juan David Huertas; Pablo Mejia; Nick Rivera Caminero; Jairo Fernandez | 3:27 |

== Charts ==
| Chart (2014) | Peak position |
|---|---|
| US Tropical Airplay (Billboard) | 29 |
