= Fénix (Nicky Jam album) =

Studio album by Nicky Jam
- Released: January 20, 2017
- Genre: Reggaeton; Latin trap
- Language: English; Spanish
- Label: Industria Inc.; Sony Latin; RCA
- Producer: Yhoan Manuel Jiménez Londoño; Johnattan Gaviria; Urbani Mota; Jorge Luis Romero; Egbert Rosa Cintron; Rvssian; Saga WhiteBlack; Jowan; Supa Dups; Pedro Reynoso; Banx & Ranx; Carlos "Maffio" Peralta; Carlos Paucar; Jorge Fonseca

Nicky Jam chronology
Greatest Hits (Vol. 1) (2014)	Fénix (2017)	Íntimo (2019)

Singles from Fénix
- 1. "El Perdón" Released: February 6, 2015; 2. "Hasta el Amanecer" Released: January 15, 2016; 3. "El Amante" Released: January 16, 2017; 4. "Si Tú la Ves" Released: July 28, 2017

Fénix (pronounced [ˈfeniɣs]; English: Phoenix) is the third studio album by American singer Nicky Jam. It was released on January 20, 2017, by Industria Inc., Sony Music Latin and RCA Records. It was produced by Yhoan Manuel Jiménez Londoño, Johnattan Gaviria, Urbani Mota, Jorge Luis Romero, Egbert Rosa Cintron, Rvssian, Saga WhiteBlack, Jowan, Supa Dups, Pedro Reynoso, Banx & Ranx, Carlos "Maffio" Peralta, Carlos Paucar and Jorge Fonseca and features collaborations with Plan B, Sean Paul, Konshens, J Balvin, Wisin, El Alfa, Cosculluela, Daddy Yankee, Messiah, MineK, Arcángel, Valentino, Enrique Iglesias and Kid Ink.

At the 18th Annual Latin Grammy Awards, the album was nominated for a Latin Grammy Award for Album of the Year while "El Amante" was nominated for Best Urban Fusion/Performance and Best Urban Song. Additionally, the song "El Perdón" won Best Urban Fusion/Performance two years prior in 2015. The album also won Top Latin Album of the Year at the 2018 Billboard Latin Music Awards.

The album proved to be a massive hit and gained Nicky Jam worldwide recognition. It reached the top position on both the Top Latin Albums and Latin Rhythm Albums chart, being his first and only number-one album on both charts to date. Additionally, it was certified platinum in United States and Mexico.

== Background ==
The album was the first studio album by Nicky Jam in 10 years after the release of The Black Carpet in 2007, the album followed a period of drug addiction that kept him away from recording music. The name of the album, "phoenix" in English, is inspired by the immortal creature of Greek mythology. He has said that "I was even in jail, I was in the worst moments of my life, I had a very dark moment in my life where people no longer gave a penny for me, where people didn't want to listen to my music, that's why I identify with the phoenix, that's why the album is called Fénix."

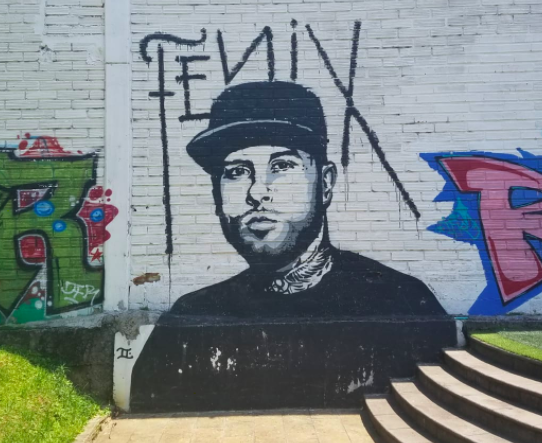
Mural in Medellín, Colombia, pictured in 2018.

The cover of the album is a picture of a mural painted by the collective PeopWall of Nicky Jam in Medellin, Colombia. Jam decided to feature the mural on the cover after being tagged by the collective on Instagram. Prior to the release of the album, he embarked on the Fénix Tour that started on July 2, 2016, at the Philips Arena in Atlanta, Georgia, and featured appearances from Zion & Lennox, De La Ghetto, and Valentino. Following its release, he promoted it with a series of concerts in countries such as Mexico, where he performed at Monterrey, Mexico City, and Guadalajara. The album includes English versions of the songs "El Perdon," as "Forgiveness", and "Hasta el Amanecer," as "With You Tonight," the latter featuring American rapper Kid Ink.

== Singles ==
The song "El Perdón" with Spanish singer Enrique Iglesias was released on February 6, 2015. The song was commercially successful reaching the top positions in various countries such as France and Spain, as well as topping the Hot Latin Songs chart in United States. It also peaked at number 56 on the Billboard Hot 100 chart, being Nicky Jam's first appearance on the chart. The song "Hasta el Amanecer" was released on January 15, 2016, and also reached number one at the Hot Latin Songs chart, being his second number-one song in the chart.

"El Amante" was released as the third single for the album on January 15, 2017. The fourth single was "Si Tú La Ves", a collaboration with Puerto Rican singer Wisin released on July 28, 2017. The first three singles were certified platinum in the U.S. with "El Perdón" selling over 1.6 million copies as of 2017.

== Track listing ==
Fénix track listing
No.	Title	Writer(s)	Producer(s)	Length
1.	"El Ganador"	Nick Rivera Caminero; Juan Diego Medina; Johnattan Gaviria; Yhoan Manuel Jiménez Londoño	Yhoan Manuel Jiménez Londoño; Johnattan Gaviria	3:19
2.	"Estrella"	Rivera Caminero; Medina; Jorge Luis Romero; Urbani Mota	Urbani Mota; Jorge Luis Romero	3:39
3.	"Por el Momento" (featuring Plan B)	Rivera Caminero; Medina; Orlando Valle; Edwin Vazquez; Egbert Rosa Cintron; Rafael Pina	Haze	3:38
4.	"Amor Prohibido" (featuring Sean Paul and Konshens)	Rivera Caminero; Medina; Ryan Francis Henriques; Garfield Spence; Michael Alexander Fallin; Tarik Johnston	Rvssian	4:20
5.	"El Amante"	Rivera Caminero; Medina; Cristhian Mena "Saga WhiteBlack"	Saga WhiteBlack	3:39
6.	"Superhéroe" (featuring J Balvin)	Rivera Caminero; Medina; Jose Alvaro Osorio Balvin; Alejandro Patiño; Andrés David Restrepo; Johan Esteban Espinosa; Salomón Villada Hoyos	Jowan	3:26
7.	"Si Tú la Ves" (featuring Wisin)	Rivera Caminero; Medina; Juan Luis Morera; Mena; Johnattan Ballesteros	Saga WhiteBlack	3:41
8.	"No Te Puedo Olvidar"	Rivera Caminero; Medina; Dwayne Chin-Quee	Supa Dups	3:20
9.	"Nadie Como Tú" (featuring El Alfa)	Rivera Caminero; Medina; Emmanuel Herrera	Pedro Reynoso	3:19
10.	"No Te Vayas"	Rivera Caminero; Medina; Mena	Saga WhiteBlack	3:59
11.	"Mi Maldición" (featuring Cosculluela)	Rivera Caminero; Medina; Mena; Ballesteros; Jose Cosculluela	Saga WhiteBlack	3:36
12.	"Tu Hombre" (featuring Daddy Yankee)	Rivera Caminero; Medina; Mena; Ramón L. Ayala	Saga WhiteBlack	3:24
13.	"Mi Fantasía" (featuring Messiah)	Rivera Caminero; Medina; Mota; Romero; Benito Emmanuel	Urbani Mota; Jorge Luis Romero	3:40
14.	"Tu Cuerpo Me Ama" (featuring MineK)	Rivera Caminero; Medina; Mena; Daniela Ibañez	Saga WhiteBlack	3:20
15.	"Mil Lágrimas"	Rivera Caminero; Medina; Mena	Saga WhiteBlack	3:28
16.	"Despacio" (featuring Arcángel)	Rivera Caminero; Medina; Mota; Romero; Pina; Austin Santos	Urbani Mota; Jorge Luis Romero	2:59
17.	"Cuando Quieras" (featuring Valentino)	Rivera Caminero; Medina; Mena; Ballesteros; Peter Gonzalez	Saga WhiteBlack	3:47
18.	"Me Enamoras"	Rivera Caminero; Medina; Johnston; Stephen McGregor	Rvssian	2:49
19.	"I Can't Forget You"	Rivera Caminero; Medina; Chin-Quee; Edwin Serrano; Eritza Laues; Yannick Rastogi; Zacharie Raymond	Supa Dups; Banx & Ranx	3:20
20.	"Without You"	Rivera Caminero; Medina; Carlos "Maffio" Peralta; David Foreman; Frederick Acker; Katia Kline; Robert Fernandez	Carlos "Maffio" Peralta	3:53
21.	"El Perdón" (with Enrique Iglesias)	Rivera Caminero; Medina; Mena; Enrique Iglesias	Saga WhiteBlack; Carlos Paucar; Jorge Fonseca	3:25
22.	"Hasta el Amanecer"	Rivera Caminero; Medina; Mena	Saga WhiteBlack	3:18
23.	"Hasta el Amanecer - The Remix" (featuring Daddy Yankee)	Rivera Caminero; Medina; Mena; Ayala	Saga WhiteBlack	3:08
24.	"With You Tonight (Hasta El Amanecer)"	Rivera Caminero; Medina; Mena; Theron Thomas; Timothy Thomas	Saga WhiteBlack	3:08
25.	"El Perdón (Forgiveness)" (with Enrique Iglesias)	Rivera Caminero; Medina; Mena; Iglesias; Matt James; Theron Thomas; Timothy Thomas	Saga WhiteBlack; Carlos Paucar; Jorge Fonseca	3:28
26.	"With You Tonight (Hasta El Amanecer) [Remix]" (featuring Kid Ink)	Rivera Caminero; Medina; Mena; Brian Todd Collins; Theron Thomas; Timothy Thomas	Saga WhiteBlack	3:15
Total length:				90:35

== Charts ==
=== Weekly charts ===
Chart (2017)	Peak position
Belgian Albums (Ultratop Wallonia)	160
Canadian Albums (Billboard)	99
Dutch Albums (Album Top 100)	93
French Albums (SNEP)	96
Italian Albums (FIMI)	38
Spanish Albums (PROMUSICAE)	35
Swiss Albums (Schweizer Hitparade)	5
US Billboard 200	28
US Top Latin Albums (Billboard)	1
US Latin Rhythm Albums (Billboard)	1

Chart (2025)	Peak position
Portuguese Albums (AFP)	95

=== Year-end charts ===
Chart (2017)	Position
French Albums (SNEP)	191
US Top Latin Albums (Billboard)	1
Chart (2018)	Position
US Top Latin Albums (Billboard)	6
Chart (2019)	Position
US Top Latin Albums (Billboard)	16
Chart (2020)	Position
US Top Latin Albums (Billboard)	40
Chart (2021)	Position
US Top Latin Albums (Billboard)	44

== Certifications ==
Region	Certification	Certified units/sales
France (SNEP)	Gold	50,000^{‡}
Italy (FIMI)	Platinum	50,000^{‡}
Mexico (AMPROFON)	3× Platinum+Gold	210,000^{‡}
Poland (ZPAV)	Gold	10,000^{‡}
United States (RIAA)	11× Platinum (Latin)	660,000^{‡}
Download
Chile (Profovi)	Platinum	25,000,000
^{‡} Sales+streaming figures based on certification alone.
