= ...Distinto a los demás =

EP by Nicky Jam
- Released: June 21, 1995
- Recorded: 1994–1995
- Genre: Reggaeton
- Length: 26:08
- Labels: F&K Records

Nicky Jam chronology
...Distinto a los demás (1995)	Haciendo Escante (2001)

...Distinto a los demás is the debut extended play by American reggaeton singer Nicky Jam. Released in June 21, 1995, he was 14 years old when he recorded the album.

== Background and history ==
Nicky Jam was born in Lawrence, Massachusetts to a Dominican mother and Puerto Rican father. While in Massachusetts, he developed an affinity for hip-hop, specifically East Coast acts Marky Mark and the Funky Bunch and LL Cool J. When Nicky Jam was ten years old, his family moved to the Río Hondo suburb of San Juan, Puerto Rico.

Nicky Jam initially experienced culture shock upon moving to Puerto Rico, having never spoken Spanish before arriving to the island. Despite the difficult start, he quickly made friends in his neighborhood and after spending time in the streets as a middle schooler, was inspired to pursue a musical career. He also used Caribbean hip-hop and reggaeton as a way to help him polish his Spanish-language skills. He originally went by the moniker "Nick MC", but changed it to Nicky Jam after a neighborhood homeless man gave him the unsolicited comment, "You ain't Nick MC, you're Nicky Jam".

While working at the Pueblo Xtra discount grocery store at age eleven, he passed time by rapping about the items he was bagging, which impressed a customer who invited him to record with a local indie label. He subsequently signed a contract without reading it and received no advance money for his recordings. He recorded and released ...Distinto a los demás in 1995 at age thirteen. He endured a difficult breakup with his girlfriend shortly after the EP's release and the emotional pain of the experience led him to try cocaine for the first time at age fifteen. Nicky Jam reflected on the experience by saying: "[I thought], 'why am I going to take care of myself? My dad didn't handle his drug problems. My mom did drugs too, so why not me?' I mean, I had drugs all around me, and the foundation of everything is your home. It's your family."

== Track listing ==
1. "Distinto A Los Demás (Feat. Baby Gringo)"
2. "El Corazón Me Duele (Feat. Baby Doc)"
3. "Mi Estilo Predomino"
4. "Si Te Metes Conmigo"
5. "Música, Estilo & Motivación"
6. "Compton Styles From Puerto Rico"
7. "Gotta Get It (Feat. Fresh J)"
8. "Sigo Potente"
