= Si Tú la Ves =

Single by Nicky Jam featuring Wisin

from the album Fénix
- Released: July 28, 2017
- Genre: Latin pop; reggaeton
- Length: 3:41
- Label: Sony Latin; RCA
- Songwriters: Christian Mena; Juan Luis Morera Luna; Jonathan Ballesteros; Juan Diego Medina Vélez; Jefferson Junior; Nick Rivera Caminero
- Producers: Saga WhiteBlack; Wisin; Nicky Jam

Nicky Jam singles chronology
"El Amante" (2017)	"Si Tú la Ves" (2017)	"Perro Fiel" (2017)

Wisin singles chronology
"Escápate Conmigo" (2017)	"Si Tú la Ves" (2017)	"Como Antes" (2017)

Music video
- "Si Tú la Ves" on YouTube

"Si Tú la Ves" ("If You See Her") is a song recorded by American singer Nicky Jam featuring fellow Puerto Rican rapper Wisin. It was released on July 28, 2017, as the fourth single from Nicky Jam's fourth studio album, Fénix (2017). It was written by Nicky Jam, Wisin, Christian Mena, Jonathan Ballesteros, Juan Diego Medina Vélez and Jefferson Junior, and was produced by Nicky Jam, Wisin and Saga WhiteBlack. The single peaked at number 18 on the Billboard Hot Latin Songs chart.

== Concept video ==
On February 10, 2017, Nicky Jam released a concept video for "Si Tú la Ves" on his YouTube account. The concept video features Nicky Jam sitting in a dark room watching his latest visual project for the song. It has so far been viewed over 170 million times.

== Music video ==
The music video for "Si Tú la Ves" premiered on July 28, 2017 on Nicky Jam's YouTube account. It was directed by JP Valencia of 36 Grados and shot in Quito, Ecuador. It has so far been viewed over 340 million times.

== Track listing ==
Digital download
No.	Title	Writer(s)	Producer(s)	Length
1.	"Si Tú la Ves" (featuring Wisin)	Christian Mena; Juan Luis Morera Luna; Jonathan Ballesteros; Juan Diego Medina Vélez; Jefferson Junior; Nick Rivera Caminero	Saga WhiteBlack; Wisin; Nicky Jam	3:41

== Charts ==
=== Weekly charts ===
Chart (2017)	Peak position
Bolivia (Monitor Latino)	10
Colombia (National-Report)	9
Honduras (Monitor Latino)	7
Paraguay (Monitor Latino)	12
US Hot Latin Songs (Billboard)	18
US Latin Airplay (Billboard)	17
US Latin Rhythm Airplay (Billboard)	11
Venezuela (National-Report)	41

=== Year-end charts ===
Chart (2017)	Position
Spain (PROMUSICAE)	83
US Hot Latin Songs (Billboard)	45

== Certifications ==
Region	Certification	Certified units/sales
Italy (FIMI)	Gold	25,000^{‡}
Mexico (AMPROFON)	4× Platinum	240,000^{‡}
Spain (Promusicae)	Platinum	40,000^{‡}
^{‡} Sales+streaming figures based on certification alone.

== Release history ==
Region	Date	Format	Label	Ref.
Worldwide	27 July 2017	Digital download	Sony Latin; RCA	
