= Tom Kubis =

American jazz musician and arranger (born 1951)

Background information
- Born: 1951 (age 74–75); Los Angeles, California, U.S.
- Genres: Jazz, big band
- Occupations: Musician, arranger, composer
- Instruments: Saxophone, flute, piano
- Website: www.tomkubis.com

Tom Kubis is an American jazz musician and arranger.

A native of Los Angeles, Kubis started a big band to play his arrangements. He has also written arrangements for Bill Watrous and the BBC Radio Big Band.

He studied 20th century composition at Long Beach State University and worked in television with Steve Allen, Helen Reddy, Jackie Gleason, and Bob Newhart. During the 1960s, he played flute and saxophone with Louie Bellson, Pete Christlieb, Frank Rosolino, Arturo Sandoval, Jack Sheldon, and Bill Watrous.

His arrangements were featured at the Kennedy Center in Washington, D.C., in a presentation written by Cy Coleman and Alan and Marilyn Bergman. In 1993, Kubis conducted his arrangements with Jack Sheldon at Carnegie Hall. His arrangements have been performed at the Playboy Jazz Festival, the Montreux Jazz Festival, and the Berkeley Jazz Festival. His big band performed at the Orange County Performing Arts Center with the Pacific Symphony Orchestra.

== Discography ==
=== As leader ===
- Slightly Off the Ground, (Sea Breeze, 1989)
- At Last, (Cexton, 1992)
- It's Not Just for Christmas Anymore (Cexton, 1995)
- Fast Cars & Fascinating Women (Sea Breeze, 1996)
- You Just Can't Have Enough Christmas (Cexton, 1997)
- Keep Swingin' (Sea Breeze, 1997)
- A Jazz Musician's Christmas, (Sea Breeze, 2002)
- Christmas III (Cexton, 2002)
- Live & Unleashed at Don the Beachcomber (Tom Kubis, 2013)

=== As sideman ===
- Andy Martin, Vic Lewis, The Project (Drewbone, 2004)
- Jack Sheldon, JSO Live on the Pacific Ocean (Jadi/Butterfly, 2001)
- Jack Sheldon, Sunday Afternoons at the Lighthouse (Woofy, 2005)
