= Haciendo escante =

EP by Nicky Jam
- Released: December 4, 2001
- Recorded: 2000–2001
- Genre: Reggaeton
- Labels: Pina; Picol

Nicky Jam chronology
...Distinto a los demás (1995)	Haciendo escante (2001)	Salón de la fama (2003)

Singles from Haciendo Escante
- 1. "En La Cama" Released: December 21, 2001

Haciendo escante is the second EP by American singer Nicky Jam.

== Track listing ==
No.	Title	Length
1.	"Intro" (featuring Daddy Yankee, Polaco, Falo)	1:18
2.	"Vamos A Perrear"	2:27
3.	"En La Cama" (featuring Daddy Yankee)	2:37
4.	"Interlude"	0:32
5.	"Suelta"	2:58
6.	"Mango Piña" (featuring Falo)	2:00
7.	"Desesperau"	2:18
8.	"Hasta 'Bajo" (featuring Rey Pirin Blunt)	2:16
9.	"Cuando Apague La Luz" (featuring Kino Rankins)	2:54
10.	"Cuerpo Mortal"	2:28
11.	"Eres Tu"	3:15
12.	"Despedida"	0:48
13.	"Outro"	1:03
Total length:		26:54
