= Vida escante =

2004 Album by Nicky Jam

Studio album by Nicky Jam
- Released: November 23, 2004
- Recorded: 2003–2004
- Genre: Reggaeton
- Length: 53:44
- Label: Pina
- Producer: Luny Tunes; DJ Joe; DJ Magic; DJ Rafy Mercenario; Nesty "La Mente Maestra"; Nely; Naldo; Eliel; Harry Digital

Nicky Jam chronology
Salón de la fama (2003)	Vida escante (2004)	Vida escante: Special Edition (2005)

Vida escante: Special Edition

Studio album by Nicky Jam
- Released: July 19, 2005
- Genre: Reggaeton
- Label: Pina; Machete

Nicky Jam chronology
Vida escante (2004)	Vida escante: Special Edition (2005)	The Black Carpet (2007)

Vida escante is the first studio album by American reggaeton singer Nicky Jam. It was released in 2004 on Pina Records. The album contains the hit songs "I'm not your Husband", "Chambonea", Me Estoy Muriendo, (R.K.M & Ken-Y) and "Va Pasando el Tiempo". It sold 2 million copies.

Vida escante: Special Edition is a re-edition of the album, released on July 19, 2005.

== Track listing ==
=== Vida escante ===
No.	Title	Length
1.	"I'm Not Your Husband / Tu Marido"	3:45
2.	"Nos Fuimos" (featuring Polaco)	3:11
3.	"Vive Contigo"	3:17
4.	"Sacando Chispa" (featuring Trebol Clan and David Deambulante)	3:30
5.	"Pasado" (featuring Rakim & Ken Y)	3:44
6.	"Chambonea"	2:51
7.	"Siguen Haciendo Ruido" (featuring Lito MC Cassidy)	3:36
8.	"Adicto" (featuring David Deambulante)	2:42
9.	"Va Pasando el Tiempo"	2:56
10.	"Como Tu Me Pisas" (featuring Don Chezina)	3:59
11.	"Ya No Me Llamas" (featuring Shaka & Benny)	3:07
12.	"Fiel a Tu Piel" (featuring David Deambulante)	2:42
13.	"Me Estoy Muriendo" (featuring Rakim & Ken Y)	4:17
14.	"Siguen Haciendo Ruido (Remix)" (featuring Lito MC Cassidy)	3:36
15.	"Tus Ojos"	2:51
16.	"La Paga"	3:40
Total length:		53:44

=== Vida escante: Special Edition ===
Disc one

1. "I'm Not Your Husband / Tu Marido" (2005 Version)
2. "Nos Fuimos" (featuring Polaco)
3. "Vive Contigo"
4. "Sacando Chispas" (featuring Trebol Clan and David Deambulante)
5. "Pasado" (featuring R.K.M & Ken-Y)
6. "Chambonea"
7. "Siguen Haciendo Ruido" (featuring Lito & Polaco)
8. "Adicto" (featuring David Deambulante)
9. "Va Pasando El Tiempo"
10. "Como Tú Me Pisas" (featuring Don Chezina)
11. "Ya No Me Llamas" (featuring Shaka & Benny)
12. "Fiel a Tu Piel" (featuring David Deambulante)
13. "Me Estoy Muriendo" (R.K.M & Ken-Y)
14. "Siguen Haciendo Ruido" (Reggaeton Version) (featuring Lito & Polaco)
15. "Me Voy Pa'l Party" (Remix)

Disc two (DVD)

1. "Chambonea"
2. "Vive Contigo"
3. "Me Voy Pa'l Party" (Multimedia track)
4. "Me Estoy Muriendo" – (R.K.M & Ken-Y)
5. Bonus material

== Charts ==
Chart (2004)	Peak position
US Top Latin Albums (Billboard)	23
US Tropical Albums (Billboard)	4
