= The Black Carpet (album) =

Studio album by Nicky Jam
- Released: December 11, 2007
- Genre: Reggaeton
- Label: Pina; Universal Latino
- Producer: Raphy Pina (exec.); Los Magnificos; Mambo Kingz; Monserrate & DJ Urba; Richard Marcell; DJ Kalin; Nely El Arma Secreta

Nicky Jam chronology
Vida Escante: Special Edition (2005)	The Black Carpet (2007)	Nicky Jam Hits (2014)

The Black Carpet is the second studio album by American reggaeton recording artist Nicky Jam released on December 11, 2007. The first single of the album is "Gas Pela", featuring R.K.M & Ken-Y and produced by Monserrate & DJ Urba. The second single is "Ton Ton Ton", featuring R.K.M & Ken-Y and produced by Mambo Kingz.

== Track listing ==
No.	Title	Producer(s)	Length
1.	"Dime Si Piensas en Mi"	Los Magníficos; Mambo Kingz	3:20
2.	"Calor"	Los Magníficos; Rafy Mercenario	3:26
3.	"Gas Pela" (featuring R.K.M)	Monserrate & DJ Urba	3:28
4.	"Ton Ton Ton" (featuring R.K.M & Ken-Y)	Mambo Kingz	2:57
5.	"Si Yo Fuera Tu Hombre"	Los Magníficos; Richard Marcell	3:15
6.	"Ve y Dile (No Llores)"	Los Magníficos	3:16
7.	"Ella Quiere Candela"	Nely	3:02
8.	"Interlude"	Los Magníficos	1:37
9.	"Desilucionao"	Los Magníficos	2:36
10.	"Quedate Con El" (featuring Cruzito and Ken-Y)	Los Magníficos	3:28
11.	"Tienes Que Ser Mia"	DJ Kalin; Los Magníficos	2:55
12.	"Trankila" (featuring Carlitos Way)	Los Magníficos	3:27
13.	"Solo y Sin Amor (Ay Ya, Ya, Yay)" (featuring J-CO)	Los Magníficos	3:54
14.	"Cambiar la Rutina" (Performed by Carlitos Way)	Los Magníficos	3:31
Total length:			44:12

== Charts ==
Chart (2008)	Peak position
U.S. Billboard Top Latin Albums	24
U.S. Billboard Latin Rhythm Albums	2
