= Antonio Carmona =

Spanish singer (born 1965)

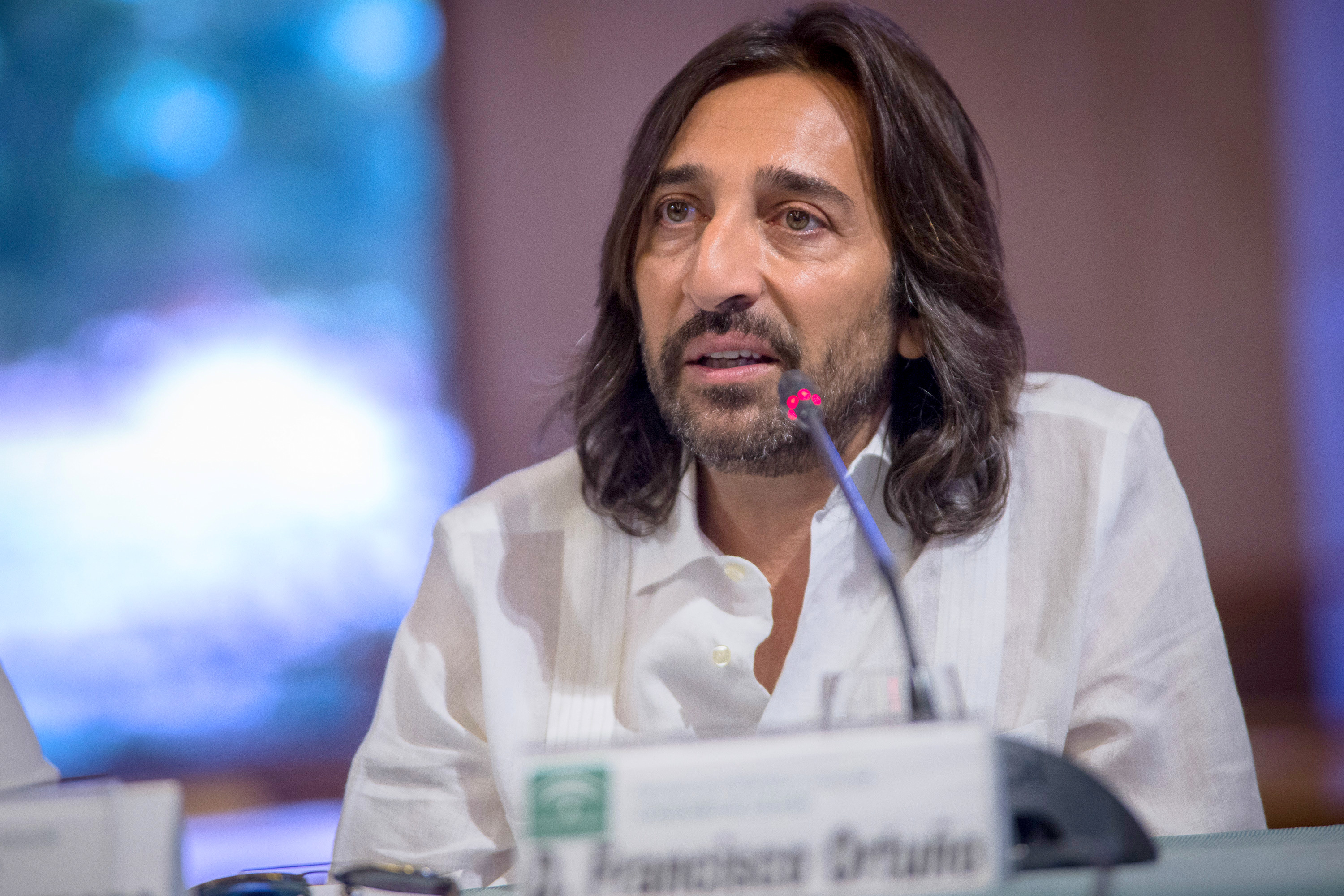

Background information
- Born: Antonio Carmona Amaya; 21 May 1965 (age 61); Granada, Spain
- Genre: New flamenco
- Occupation: Singer
- Formerly of: Ketama

Antonio Carmona Amaya (born 21 May 1965) is a Spanish gitano singer of flamenco. He also has French nationality. From the early 1980s, he was a member of the Spanish flamenco-fusion group Ketama, which he joined after main vocalist Ray Heredia left. The band also included José Soto, also known as "Sorderita". Ketama in its latest set-up included Antonio Carmona as main vocalist along with his brother, Juan José Carmona Amaya, known as "El Camborio", and his cousin, José Miguel Carmona Niño, known as "Josemi".

After the break-up of the band in 2004, Carmona started his solo career and released a series of solo albums, including his debut Vengo Venenoso in 2006 on Universal Records. He also collaborated with La Mala Rodríguez, Juanes and Alejandro Sanz. This was followed by the album De Noche in 2011, which included the single "El Camino De Los Sueños" featuring Nelly Furtado and collaborations with Spanish singer Concha Buika.

He appeared in 1988 in Berlín Blues, directed by Ricardo Franco. He had a lead role with Portuguese actress Maria de Medeiros in the 1997 film Go for Gold!, directed by Lucien Segura. In 2000, he appeared in a role in the film Gitano starring Joaquín Cortés, Pilar Bardem and Laetitia Casta.

In 1996, he wrote the song "¡Ay, qué deseo!, which represented Spain in the Eurovision Song Contest 1996. The song was interpreted by Antonio Carbonell during the contest.

In 2017, he appeared in a collaboration with Alejandro Sanz that included also the Spanish singers Pablo Alborán, David Bisbal and Manuel Carrasco with additional participation of Jesse & Joy, Juanes, Pablo López, Malú, Vanesa Martín, India Martínez, Antonio Orozco, Niña Pastori, Laura Pausini, Abel Pintos, Rozalen, Shakira, Tommy Torresin in the song "Y, ¿Si Fuera Ella?". The song topped the Spanish Singles Chart at number one.

== Discography ==
Solo albums

- Vengo Venenoso (2006)
- De Noche (2011)
- Obras Son Amores (2017)

== Filmography ==
- 1988: Berlín Blues
- 1997: Go for Gold! as Quillo
- 2000: Gitano (English title Gipsy) as Romero
