= Hasta el Amanecer =

2016 song by Nicky Jam

Single by Nicky Jam

from the album Fenix
- Released: January 15, 2016
- Genre: Reggaeton
- Length: 3:17
- Label: Sony Latin; RCA
- Songwriters: Ramón Ayala; Nick Rivera Caminero; Cristhian Camilo Mena Moreno; Juan Diego Medina

Nicky Jam singles chronology
"Como Lo Hacía Yo" (2015)	"Hasta el Amanecer" (2016)	"With You Tonight (Hasta El Amanecer)" (2016)

Music video
- "Hasta el Amanecer" on YouTube

"Hasta el Amanecer" (English: "Until Dawn") is a song by American singer Nicky Jam. The song won the Billboard Music Award for Top Latin Song at the 2017 Billboard Music Awards. It also won the Urban Song of the Year and was nominated for Single of the Year at the 29th Lo Nuestro Awards.

== Background ==
"Hasta el Amanecer" was released on January 15, 2016 on U.S. radios. Billboard called the song a "sultry, sexy reggaetón track" that contains the singer's "trademark catchy melodic hooks. Still a hopeless romantic, here Jam pines after a girl he met at the laundromat, and let go, without even finding out her name."

== Music video ==
The music video was viewed over 53 million times on YouTube after three weeks, for which Billboard's Suzette Fernandez predicted that Jam will have a prosperous award season in 2017.

As of March 2025, the song's music video has over 1.6 billion views on YouTube.

== Chart performance ==
"Hasta el Amanecer" peaked at number one on the Hot Latin Songs chart on the issue dated March 9, 2016. The song displaced Colombian reggaeton singer J Balvin's 22-week record "Ginza" from the top of the chart. "Hasta el Amanecer" became the second song by Jam to peak at number one following "El Perdón" with Spanish pop singer Enrique Iglesias in 2015. The song also took Digital Gainer on the Hot Latin Songs chart for selling 3,000 digital downloads as well as a 7% spike in streams across U.S. radios with 1.7 million audience impressions. With this, the song also peaked at number one on the Latin Airplay chart, his third single topper.

== "With You Tonight (Hasta el Amanecer)" ==
"With You Tonight (Hasta el Amanecer)"

Single by Nicky Jam

from the album Fenix
- Released: April 22, 2016
- Genre: Reggaeton
- Length: 3:28
- Label: Sony Latin; RCA
- Songwriters: Ramón Ayala; Nick Rivera Caminero; Cristhian Camilo Mena Moreno; Juan Diego Medina

Nicky Jam singles chronology
"Hasta el Amanecer" (2016)	"With You Tonight (Hasta el Amanecer)" (2016)	"El Amante" (2017)

Music video
- "With You Tonight" on YouTube

Jam released an English version of the song, retitled "With You Tonight (Hasta el Amanecer)", on April 22, 2016. The English version was remixed with a verse performed by American rapper Kid Ink.

== Charts ==
=== Weekly charts ===
Chart (2016–17)	Peak position
Chile (Monitor Latino)	6
Dominican Republic (Monitor Latino)	11
France (SNEP)	38
Hungary (Rádiós Top 40)	18
Hungary (Single Top 40)	34
Italy (FIMI)	28
Panama (Monitor Latino)	16
Spain (Promusicae)	2
US Billboard Hot 100	73
US Hot Latin Songs (Billboard)	1
US Latin Airplay (Billboard)	1
US Pop Airplay (Billboard)	32

=== Year-end charts ===
Chart (2016)	Position
Spain (PROMUSICAE)	6
US Hot Latin Songs (Billboard)	1

Chart (2017)	Position
Hungary (Rádiós Top 40)	54
US Hot Latin Songs (Billboard)	32

=== Decade-end charts ===
Chart (2010–2019)	Position
US Hot Latin Songs (Billboard)	6

=== All-time charts ===
Chart (2021)	Position
US Hot Latin Songs (Billboard)	13

== Certifications ==
Region	Certification	Certified units/sales
Canada (Music Canada)	Platinum	80,000^{‡}
France (SNEP)	Diamond	333,333^{‡}
Italy (FIMI)	2× Platinum	100,000^{‡}
Mexico (AMPROFON)	Diamond+4× Platinum	540,000^{‡}
Portugal (AFP)	Gold	5,000^{‡}
Spain (Promusicae)	4× Platinum	160,000^{‡}
Sweden (GLF)	Gold	20,000^{‡}
Switzerland (IFPI Switzerland)	Gold	15,000^{‡}
United States (RIAA)	22× Platinum (Latin)	1,320,000^{‡}
^{‡} Sales+streaming figures based on certification alone.

== See also ==
- List of number-one Billboard Hot Latin Songs of 2016
