= El Amante =

2017 single by Nicky Jam

- Cover art for the remix

Single by Nicky Jam

from the album Fénix
- Language: Spanish
- English title: "The Lover"
- Released: January 16, 2017
- Genre: Reggaeton
- Length: 3:36
- Label: Sony Latin
- Songwriters: Nick Rivera; Cristhian Mena; Juan Vélez
- Producer: Saga WhiteBlack

Nicky Jam singles chronology
"With You Tonight (Hasta El Amanecer)" (2016)	"El Amante" (2017)	"Si Tú la Ves" (2017)

Music video
- "El Amante" on YouTube

"El Amante" (English: "The Lover") is a song by American singer Nicky Jam from his fourth studio album, Fénix (2017). Written by Jam, Juan Vélez, and its producer Saga WhiteBlack, the track was released by Sony Music Latin on January 16, 2017, as the fourth single from the album. A remix featuring Ozuna and Bad Bunny was released on June 26, 2017.

== Music video ==
The music video for "El Amante" was released on January 15, 2017, and has received over 1.3 billion views on YouTube.

== Charts ==
=== Weekly charts ===
Chart (2017)	Peak position
Colombia (National-Report)	3
Dominican Republic (Monitor Latino)	6
Ecuador (National-Report)	21
El Salvador (Monitor Latino)	10
France (SNEP)	135
Italy (FIMI)	17
Mexico (Billboard Mexican Airplay)	10
Netherlands (Single Top 100)	78
Panama (Monitor Latino)	2
Paraguay (Monitor Latino)	6
Portugal (AFP)	48
Spain (PROMUSICAE)	3
Switzerland (Schweizer Hitparade)	31
Uruguay (Monitor Latino)	12
US Billboard Hot 100	92
US Hot Latin Songs (Billboard)	2
US Latin Airplay (Billboard)	1
US Latin Rhythm Airplay (Billboard)	1
Venezuela (National-Report)	13

=== Year-end charts ===
Chart (2017)	Position
Argentina (CAPIF)	5
Italy (FIMI)	41
México (AMPROFON)	7
Portugal (AFP)	97
Spain (PROMUSICAE)	6
Switzerland (Schweizer Hitparade)	75
US Hot Latin Songs (Billboard)	6

=== Decade-end charts ===
Chart (2010–2019)	Position
US Hot Latin Songs (Billboard)	43

== Certifications ==
Region	Certification	Certified units/sales
Canada (Music Canada)	Platinum	80,000^{‡}
France (SNEP)	Gold	100,000^{‡}
Italy (FIMI)	3× Platinum	150,000^{‡}
Mexico (AMPROFON)	2× Diamond+Gold	630,000^{‡}
Spain (Promusicae)	4× Platinum	160,000^{‡}
Sweden (GLF)	Gold	20,000^{‡}
Switzerland (IFPI Switzerland)	Platinum	20,000^{‡}
United States (RIAA)	13× Platinum (Latin)	780,000^{‡}
Streaming
Chile (Profovi)	2× Platinum	16,000,000
^{‡} Sales+streaming figures based on certification alone.

== See also ==
- List of Billboard number-one Latin songs of 2017
