= Íntimo =

Studio album by Nicky Jam
- Released: November 1, 2019
- Label: Sony Latin

Nicky Jam chronology
Fénix (2017)	Íntimo (2019)	Infinity (2021)

Singles from Íntimo
- 1. "X" Released: March 2, 2018; 2. "Te Robaré" Released: March 22, 2019; 3. "Atrévete" Released: August 2, 2019; 4. "Whine Up" Released: October 29, 2019

Íntimo is the fourth studio album by American singer Nicky Jam. It was released on November 1, 2019, by Sony Music Latin. The album was promoted by a documentary.

== Track listing ==
No.	Title	Length
1.	"Sin Filtro"	3:17
2.	"Tequila"	2:54
3.	"Whine Up" (With Anuel AA)	3:36
4.	"Maniquí"	2:56
5.	"Perdóname" (With Darell)	2:58
6.	"Novia Nueva"	3:00
7.	"Quisieras" (With Rauw Alejandro)	3:06
8.	"Destino"	3:22
9.	"Come Y Te Vas"	2:46
10.	"Borracho"	3:28
11.	"La Toco"	2:17
12.	"Atrévete" (With Sech)	3:19
13.	"Te Robaré" (With Ozuna)	3:21
14.	"X" (With J Balvin)	2:54
15.	"La Promesa (La Calle)"	2:54
Total length:		46:00

== Charts ==
=== Weekly charts ===
Chart (2019)	Peak position
French Albums (SNEP)	120
Italian Albums (FIMI)	70
Swiss Albums (Schweizer Hitparade)	67
US Billboard 200	132
US Top Latin Albums (Billboard)	3
US Latin Rhythm Albums (Billboard)	3

=== Year-end charts ===
Chart (2019)	Position
US Top Latin Albums (Billboard)	80
Chart (2020)	Position
US Top Latin Albums (Billboard)	34

== Certifications ==
Region	Certification	Certified units/sales
Brazil (Pro-Música Brasil)	Platinum	40,000^{‡}
Italy (FIMI)	Gold	25,000^{‡}
Mexico (AMPROFON)	3× Platinum	180,000^{‡}
United States (RIAA)	4× Platinum (Latin)	240,000^{‡}
^{‡} Sales+streaming figures based on certification alone.
