= Nicky Jam =

American singer (born 1981)

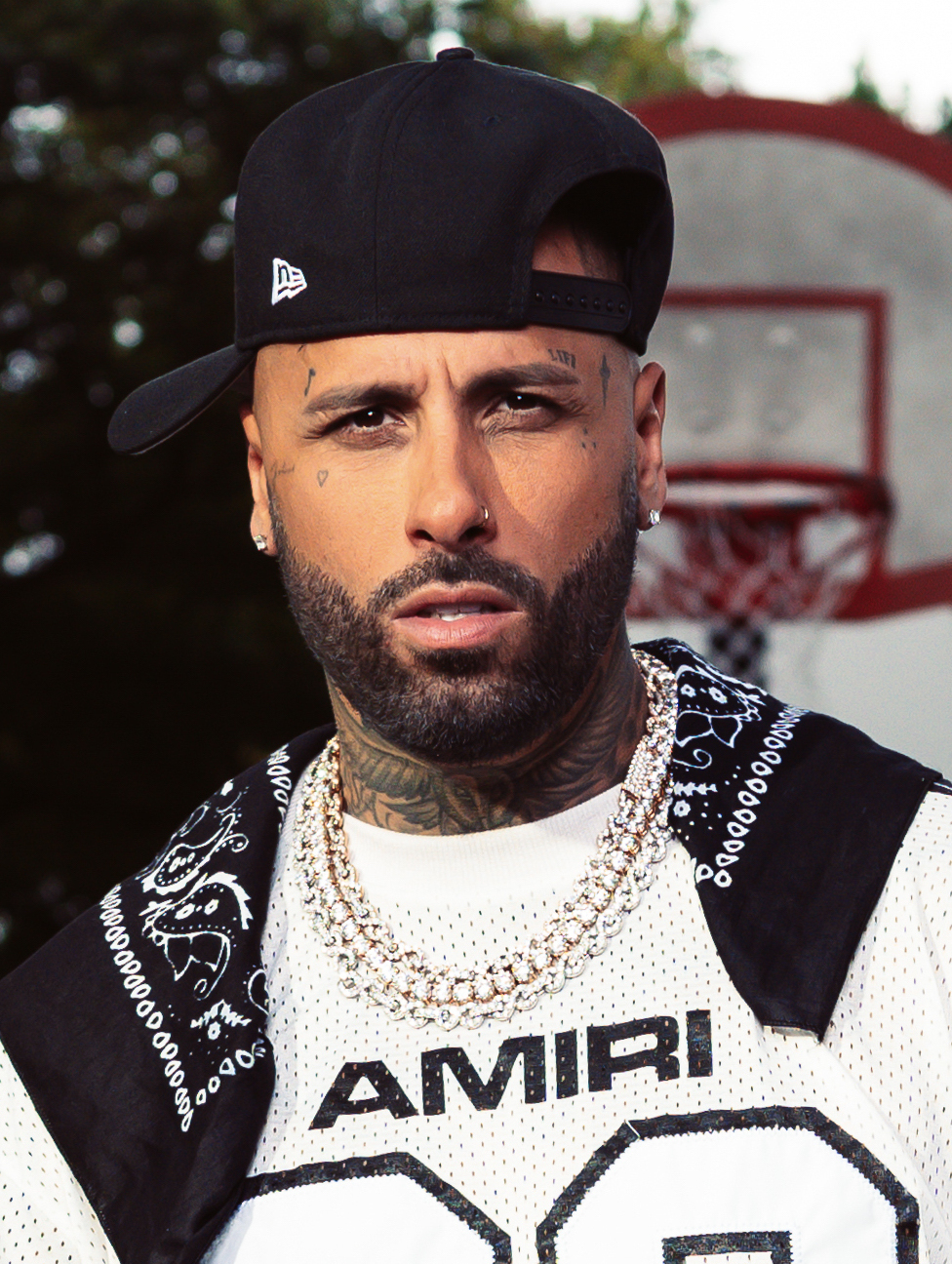
- Nicky Jam in 2024
- Born: Nick Rivera Caminero; March 17, 1981 (age 45); Lawrence, Massachusetts, U.S.
- Citizenship: United States; Colombia
- Occupation: Singer
- Years active: 1995–present
- Musical career
- Genres: Reggaeton; Latin pop; dancehall; Latin trap
- Labels: La Industria; Sony Latin; RCA; Virgin Music Group
- Website: www.iamnickyjam.com

Signature
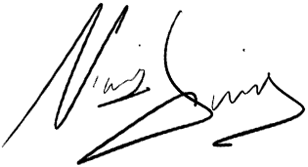

Nick Rivera Caminero (born March 17, 1981), known professionally as Nicky Jam, is an American singer. He is best known for hits such as "X", "Travesuras", "El Perdón", "Hasta el Amanecer", and "El Amante"; the latter three are from his 2017 album Fénix. He has frequently collaborated with other Latin artists such as Daddy Yankee, J Balvin, Ozuna, Plan B and Anuel AA. While his early music exemplified traditional fast-paced reggaeton, his newer compositions place more emphasis on sung vocals and romantic lyrics.

Born in Lawrence, Massachusetts, to a Dominican mother and a Puerto Rican father, he moved with his family to Puerto Rico when he was ten years old. He began recording music at age fourteen with his first EP ...Distinto a los demás (1995), and eventually caught the attention of Daddy Yankee. The two formed the group Los Cangris, which was active from the late 1990s to 2004. The pair split acrimoniously, and Nicky Jam's career quickly took a sharp decline, followed by a period of legal struggles and substance abuse.

He then moved to Medellín, Colombia, where he rejuvenated his career and developed a more melodic style of music, which proved to be popular through the release of the singles "Voy a Beber" and "Travesuras" in 2014. His success was furthered by the 2015 single "El Perdón" and his 2017 album Fénix. He released the album Íntimo in 2019, which was a critical and commercial success. Nicky Jam has also acted in the films XXX: Return of Xander Cage (2017) and Bad Boys for Life (2020), and starred in and executive produced the Netflix biographical series Nicky Jam: El Ganador (2018).

== Life and career ==
=== 1981–1996: Early life and career beginnings ===
Nick Rivera Caminero was born on March 17, 1981, in Lawrence, Massachusetts, to a Dominican mother and Puerto Rican father. Having been born on Saint Patrick's Day, he enjoyed attending parades for the holiday as a little boy. While in Massachusetts, he developed an affinity for hip-hop, specifically East Coast acts Marky Mark and the Funky Bunch and LL Cool J. When Nicky Jam was ten years old, his family moved to the Río Hondo suburb of San Juan, Puerto Rico, in an attempt to reconnect with the family's Puerto Rican roots. However, in an interview with Billboard, Nicky Jam explained that his father had become embroiled in a drug-related case and escaped bail, necessitating the move to Puerto Rico.

Nicky Jam initially experienced culture shock upon moving to Puerto Rico, having never spoken Spanish before arriving to the island. Despite the difficult start, he quickly made friends in his neighborhood and after spending time in the streets as a middle schooler, became inspired to pursue a musical career. He also used Caribbean hip-hop and reggaeton as a way to help him polish his Spanish-language skills. He originally went by the moniker "Nick MC", but changed it to Nicky Jam after a neighborhood homeless man gave him the unsolicited comment, "You ain't Nick MC, you're Nicky Jam".

While working at the Pueblo Xtra discount grocery store at age eleven, he passed time by rapping about the items he was bagging, which impressed a customer who invited him to record with a local indie label. He subsequently signed a contract without reading it and received no advance money for his recordings. He recorded and released his first EP ...Distinto a los demás in 1995 at age fourteen. He endured a difficult breakup with his girlfriend shortly after the album's release and the emotional pain of the experience led him to try cocaine for the first time at age fifteen. Nicky Jam reflected on the experience by saying: "[I thought], 'why am I going to take care of myself? My dad didn't handle his drug problems. My mom did drugs too, so why not me?' I mean, I had drugs all around me, and the foundation of everything is your home. It's your family."

=== 1997–2006: Los Cangris and career decline ===
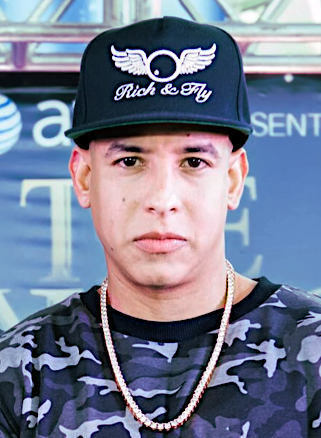
Nicky Jam formed the duo Los Cangris with his idol and mentor, Daddy Yankee (pictured).

Despite his drug use, he managed to gain popularity in Puerto Rico as a hip-hop artist and eventually met his idol, Daddy Yankee. Nicky Jam recalled that Daddy Yankee was familiar with his work, explaining, "He looked at me and said, 'I know who you are. You're that little kid that sings rap in a little Mickey Mouse voice. I like your style.'" The two artists then formed a duo called Los Cangris. The duo achieved success in Puerto Rico through hit singles such as "En la Cama", "Dónde Están las Gatas", and "Guayando". While in the group, he went on to release the solo albums Haciendo escante (2001) and Vida escante (2004).

However, Nicky Jam struggled to adjust to his new lifestyle and began using drugs and alcohol to an extent that concerned his musical partner. Having used cocaine on and off since age 15, he later began using Percocet. Daddy Yankee began to criticize Nicky Jam's behavior and alluded to his bandmate in songs, including the lyric "your courage depends on a pill" from the 2004 song "Santifica Tus Escapularios". This led an incensed Nicky Jam to release a diss track in response that same year. Nicky Jam quickly regretted releasing the song, explaining, "That wasn't a good choice, because he came with [2004 Billboard Hot 100 hit] 'Gasolina.' [I] looked stupid. He went his way, I went my way -- and obviously my way didn't go very well."

Los Cangris separated in 2004 after a falling out between the two musicians. After the breakup of Los Cangris, Nicky Jam struggled personally and professionally, calling himself the "embarrassment of the Latin Caribbean music industry". Deeply depressed, Nicky Jam gained a significant amount of weight, eventually reaching 300 pounds (136 kg). He also experienced legal troubles, including a police chase in his car that was in the process of being repossessed. He took a job in a hotel, performing lounge music for tourists. Despite viewing this period to be his "lowest point", the artist developed his singing voice during this time, learning to incorporate sung vocals into his music as opposed to strictly rapping.

=== 2007–2016: Career renewal and successful singles ===
People laugh when I say I came to Colombia and cleaned myself out of alcohol and drugs. But I've seen a whole different Colombia. [Colombians] will stop doing whatever they're doing to make you happy. Sí, señor. No, señor. There's no excuses.

— Nicky Jam, on his relocation to Medellín, Colombia.

In 2007, Nicky Jam moved to Medellín, Colombia in an attempt to stop using drugs and focus on music. The musician was well received by the people in Medellín, and the singer reflected, "They made me feel like I was a legend. The boost they gave me made me want to be a better person. I started eating OK, I stopped drugs, I stopped alcohol. People came to love me because I was loving myself." In 2010, Nicky Jam suffered a nearly fatal overdose that served as the impetus for him to quit using drugs completely. He lost 100 pounds (45 kg) and tattooed a significant portion of his body, including the entirety of his neck—which he considered a symbol of his recovery. Artistically, he drew influence from the romanticism of Colombian music, in particular the genre of vallenato. He also amended his friendship with Daddy Yankee after encountering him on a flight, where the two apologized to each other, and began touring together at the end of 2014.

His songs "Voy a Beber" and "Travesuras" reinvigorated his career and led to his signing with Sony U.S. Latin. "Travesuras" was Nicky Jam's first song to reach the top ten on the Billboard Hot Latin Songs chart. Spanish singer Enrique Iglesias contacted Nicky Jam to collaborate on the 2015 song "El Perdón", which later won Nicky Jam his first Latin Grammy for Best Urban Performance. Nicky Jam was surprised when he received the phone call from Iglesias and initially hung up on him, believing the call to be a prank. The song peaked at number 56 on the Billboard Hot 100 and spent 30 weeks on top of the Hot Latin Songs chart.

His increased popularity during this time led Nicky Jam to reunite in 2015 with his mother who had been deported to the Dominican Republic; he had not seen her for more than twenty years. He recalled, "Most of my life, I was trying to be famous, do music to see if my mom could listen to me and see me...when [the reunion] happened, it was like a movie moment. My bodyguard was like, 'There's this woman outside. She's fighting with everybody saying she's your mom and she wants to see you'...and automatically, I knew it was her because I remembered her voice." Nicky Jam was presented with the Warrior Spirit award at the 2015 Premios Tu Mundo for his "musical resilience". The following year, he recorded a remix of the 1992 song "De Pies a Cabeza" with Mexican rock band Maná, a collaboration Nicky Jam described as a "blessing". In 2016, his song "Hasta el Amanecer" became his first song to reach one billion views on YouTube. The song won the Billboard Music Award for Top Latin Song at the 2017 Billboard Music Awards. It also won the Urban Song of the Year and was nominated for Single of the Year at the 29th Lo Nuestro Awards.

=== 2017: Fénix ===
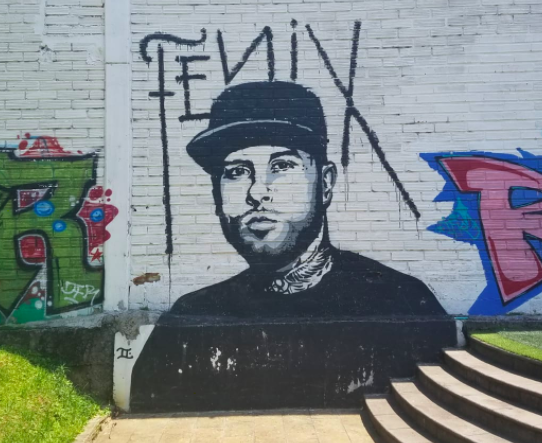
The mural of Nicky Jam in Medellín, Colombia that later became the cover of his 2017 album Fénix (mural photographed in April 2018).

On January 20, 2017, he released the album Fénix. The album cover consists of a mural painted in Medellín of Nicky Jam with the Spanish word for "Phoenix" (stylized FEИiX). This mural was painted by fans without Nicky Jam's knowledge, and upon discovering the existence of the mural, Nicky Jam was so moved that he proclaimed on Instagram that he would make the mural the cover of his next album. Fénix, a symbol of the artist's career rebirth, debuted at the top of the Billboard Top Latin Albums chart. The album reached the top of the Billboard Latin Rhythm Albums chart on February 11, 2017, and stayed on the chart for a total of 142 weeks. The record was nominated for a Latin Grammy Award for Album of the Year at the 18th Annual Latin Grammy Awards, losing to Salsa Big Band by Rubén Blades with Roberto Delgado & Orquesta.

Fénix featured collaborations from Sean Paul, El Alfa, J Balvin, and Kid Ink and included Nicky Jam's first English-language songs "Without You" and "I Can't Forget You". With the album, he hoped to maintain an organic reggaeton sound, feeling that genre had evolved into an overly "futuristic" sound in Puerto Rico. The previously released singles "El Perdón" and "Hasta el Amanecer" were included on the album in addition to the new singles "El Amante" and "Si Tú la Ves", the latter featuring Wisin of reggaeton duo Wisin & Yandel. The songs "El Amante" peaked at number two on the Billboard Hot Latin Songs chart, while "Si Tú la Ves" peaked at number 18 on the same chart. "El Amante" also reached number two on the Billboard Hot 100. Tony M. Centeno of Vibe praised the album by writing, "Despite the high demand for commercial, electronic club records, Jam manages to keep his integrity, remaining loyal to the lane he established for himself nearly 20 years ago." Nicky Jam made his acting debut in 2017 in XXX: Return of Xander Cage, the third release in the XXX action film series, acting alongside Vin Diesel.

=== 2018–present: "X" single and Íntimo ===
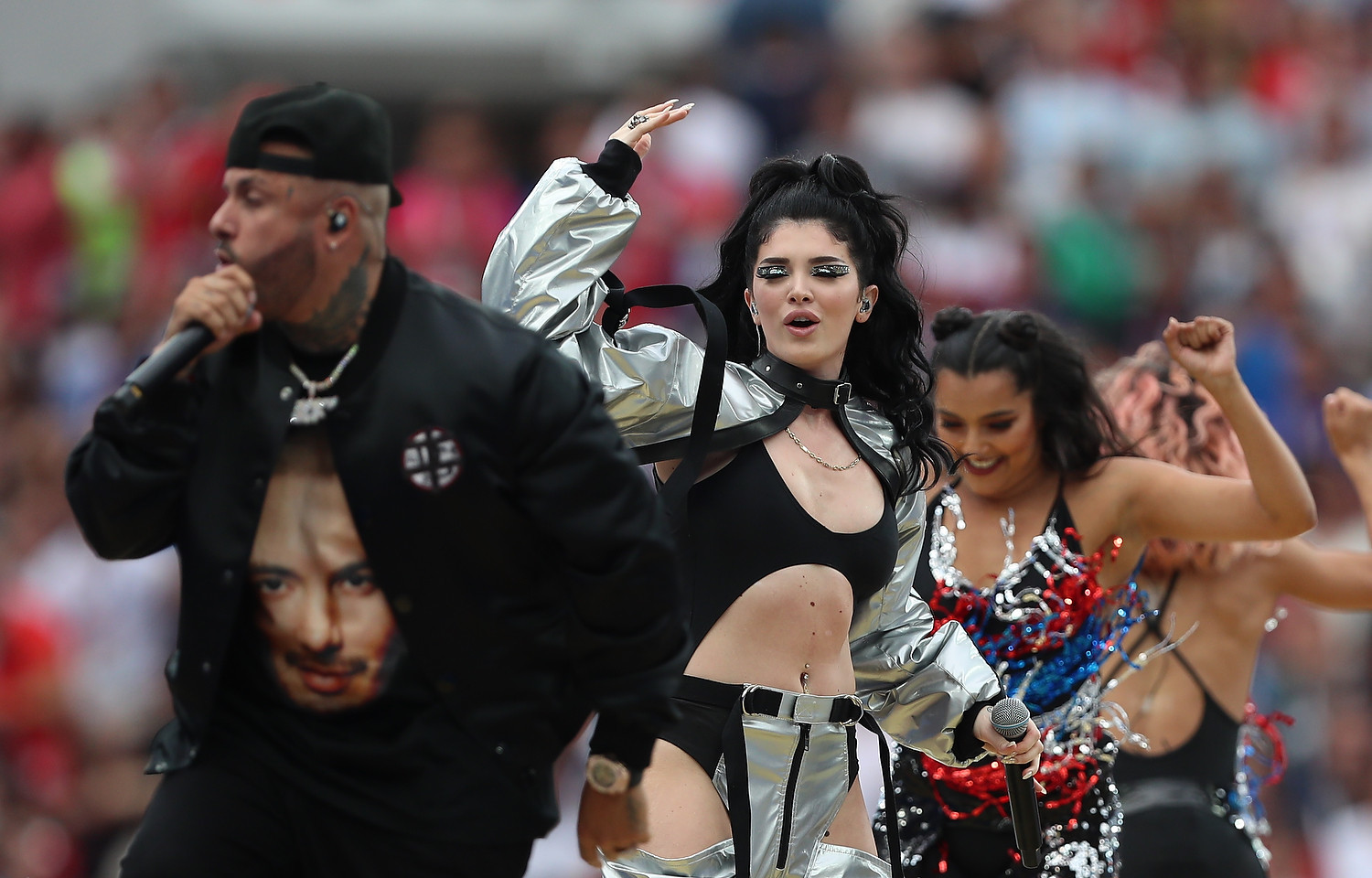
Nicky Jam performing the 2018 World Cup's official song "Live It Up"

His collaboration with J Balvin, "X", peaked at number 41 on the Billboard Hot 100. The music video for "X" drew comparisons to Sean Paul's "I'm Still in Love with You" and Drake's "Hotline Bling". The video debuted at the number one spot on YouTube's global music chart and amassed more than 200 million views in two weeks. Nicky Jam performed the song with J Balvin on The Tonight Show Starring Jimmy Fallon while Jimmy Fallon danced onstage with the two singers. Reacting to the success of the song, Nicky Jam divulged, "I knew our music was going to be big, but I didn't think it was going to be the way it is now." Nicky Jam collaborated with Will Smith, Diplo and Era Istrefi for the official 2018 FIFA World Cup anthem, "Live It Up". The song received mixed reviews, as critics derided the song's "generic message". Nicky Jam starred in the Netflix biographical series Nicky Jam: El Ganador, which explored the artist's struggles with drug addiction and his rise to fame and premiered in November 2018.

In October 2019, Nicky Jam previewed the release of his documentary, Behind Nicky Jam's Íntimo, which was produced through Apple Music. He released the album Íntimo on November 1, 2019. It contained the singles "X", "Atrévete" featuring Sech, and "Whine Up" featuring Anuel AA. Billboard called the album "17 songs of pure reggaeton magic". In November 2019, he renewed his contract with Sony Music Latin. He collaborated with Daddy Yankee on the song "Muévelo" which samples Jamaican dancehall artist Ini Kamoze's 1994 hit, "Here Comes the Hotstepper". The video, filmed in Miami, serves as an homage to the period in the 1990s in which reggaeton was criminalized in Puerto Rico. The song appeared on the soundtrack for the film Bad Boys for Life. Nicky Jam played villain Zway-Lo in the film, which was released on January 17, 2020. In March 2020, Nicky Jam was honored with the annual Career Achievement Award at the Premios Tu Música Urbano 2020 hosted by Telemundo. Nicky Jam appeared on Bad Bunny's surprise album Las que no iban a salir, released in May 2020.

In August 2021, Jam announced that his first official post-pandemic tour will kick off in early 2022. The 'Infinity' Tour will visit major cities across the U.S. and Canada, starting Feb. 3, 2022, at Boston's Agganis Arena.

== Musical style and influences ==
"Travesuras" (2014)
One of the first hits upon revitalizing his career in Medellín, the song demonstrates the melodic style the singer adopted upon his relocation as well as his reggaeton influences.

"X" (2018)
Nicky Jam's collaboration with J Balvin features a synth trumpet hook and elements of reggae, reggaeton, Latin pop and Afrobeats. The song's music video debuted at the number one spot on YouTube's global music chart and amassed more than 200 million views in two weeks.

Nicky Jam's music has been classified as Latin trap and reggaeton. Veronica Villafañe of Forbes wrote that Nicky Jam is considered "one of the architects of the Latino urban music movement". His music has been noted for both eliciting a party atmosphere and embracing overt sentimentality. His career began in the mid-1990s, when reggaeton was in its beginning stages in Puerto Rico. While his early releases exemplified the sound of old-school reggaeton that drew massive popularity in Puerto Rico, Eduardo Cepeda of Remezcla wrote that Nicky Jam's "sound has shifted from hard-hitting dembow...to more velvety rhythms and romantic lyrics". His lyrics have also been described by Billboard as "catchy and flirtatious".

His earliest musical influence was Michael Jackson's "Thriller" video; he recalls that "I knew automatically when I saw Michael Jackson do 'Thriller' as a little kid that I wanted people to fall in love with my music." The artist's first exposure to Caribbean music occurred upon seeing family members dancing to reggae at a house party hosted by his parents. Upon his relocation to Medellín, Nicky Jam adopted a more melodic, romantic approach to his music, inspired by Colombian genres such as vallenato. He has also expressed admiration for American soul singer Al Green, who he says inspired him to discuss romantic themes in his music. Other artists who have influenced Nicky Jam include Prince, Jay-Z, Jenni Rivera and Shakira. Jay-Z's The Blueprint (2001) "gave [him] an idea of how to do [his] albums in the Spanish market and give [his] fans that kind of vibe". He became a fan of Mexican rock band Maná in 1992 during the beginning stage of his career and describes the members of the group as his "idols".

== Personal life ==
Nicky Jam has four children. He married his girlfriend of two years, Angélica Cruz, in a private Catholic ceremony in Medellín in February 2017. J Balvin and Vin Diesel attended the wedding, which featured performances by reggaeton group Gente de Zona and salsa singer Jerry Rivera. In August 2018, the couple filed for divorce, citing irreconcilable differences. That same month, he purchased a house in the Palm Island area of Miami Beach for US$3.4 million. On Valentine's Day 2020, Nicky Jam became engaged to model Cydney Moreau. The couple met on the set of his music video for "Atrévete", an encounter which the singer described as "love at first sight". After posting a photo alone on Valentine's Day 2021, Nicky Jam confirmed that he and Moreau are no longer together. In an interview with Vibe, he stated that he has attention-deficit disorder. He dated Livia Rici, Nati Torres, and Paulina Cruz.

=== Politics ===
In 2018, Nicky Jam supported Deferred Action for Childhood Arrivals (DACA) recipients and criticized Donald Trump's approach to immigration.

He endorsed Trump for president at a rally in Las Vegas on September 13, 2024, wearing a Make America Great Again hat onstage and stating, "We need you. We need you back, right? We need you to be the president." During his introduction, Trump, who was apparently unfamiliar with the singer, referred to Nicky Jam as "she" and called him "hot", which caused a social media stir. In response, Mexican rock group Maná removed the song "De Pies a Cabeza," which they had recorded with Nicky Jam in 2016, from all digital platforms, stating that "Maná doesn't work with racists."

Nicky Jam went on to delete his Instagram post endorsing Trump. He withdrew his endorsement on October 30 following racist roast jokes told by Tony Hinchcliffe about Puerto Rico at a Trump rally earlier in the week, saying he was "stepping away from any political conversation" and that "Puerto Rico should be respected."

== Discography ==
=== Studio albums ===
- Vida escante (2004)
- The Black Carpet (2007)
- Fénix (2017)
- Íntimo (2019)
- Infinity (2021)
- Insomnio (2024)
- Sunshine (2025)
- Bohemio (2026)

== Filmography ==
Year	Title	Role	Notes
2017	XXX: Return of Xander Cage	Lazarus	Film
2017	The Keys of Christmas	Himself	Film
2018	Nicky Jam: El Ganador	Himself	Biographical television series
2020	Bad Boys for Life	Lorenzo "Zway-Lo" Rodriguez	Film
2021	Tom & Jerry	Butch Cat (voice)	Film
