= Roberto Delgado & Orquesta =

Panamanian salsa orchestra

- Origin: Panama
- Genres: Salsa
- Years active: 1996–present
- Members: Roberto Delgado; Juan Berna; Marcos Barraza; Carlos Pérez-Bidó; Raúl "Toto" Rivera; Ademir Berrocal; Luis Enrique Becerra; Juan Carlos "Wichy" López; Alejandro "Chichisín" Castillo; Francisco Delvecchio; Avenicio "Pin" Núñez; Idígoras Bethancourt; Carlos Ubarte
- Website: robertodelgado.com

Roberto Delgado & Orquesta is a Panamanian salsa orchestra based in Panama City. The band leader is Roberto Delgado. The band has released five studio albums and since the release of the album La Rosa de los Vientos (1996) by singer-songwriter Rubén Blades, the ensemble became his backing band for most of his projects. Following albums included Son de Panamá (2015), which was awarded the Latin Grammy Award for Best Salsa Album and the Grammy Award for Best Tropical Latin Album, and Salsa Big Band (2017), which was awarded the Latin Grammy Award for Best Salsa Album and Album of the Year, and the Grammy Award for Best Tropical Latin Album.

== Band members ==
- Roberto Delgado; musical director, producer, arranger, bass and backing vocals
- Juan Berna; piano
- Marcos Barraza; congas and backing vocals
- Carlos Pérez-Bidó; timbales and backing vocals
- Raúl "Toto" Rivera; bongó, güiro, maracas and campana
- Ademir Berrocal; drums, bongó, campana and backing vocals
- Luis Enrique Becerra; keyboard and backing vocals
- Juan Carlos "Wichy" López; trumpet
- Alejandro "Chichisín" Castillo; trumpet and trombone
- Francisco Delvecchio; trombone
- Avenicio "Pin" Núñez; trombone
- Idígoras Bethancourt; trombone
- Carlos Ubarte; baritone saxophone

== Discography ==
- Rubén Blades presenta a Roberto Delgado (1996)
- Roberto Delgado & Orquesta (2004)
- Roberto Delgado y su Orquesta... En Vivo (2008)
- Son de Panamá (2015)
- Salsa Big Band (2017)
- SALSWING! (2021)
- SALSA PLUS! (2021)
- SWING! (2021)

== Awards and nominations ==
=== Grammy Awards ===
The Grammy Awards are awarded annually by the National Academy of Recording Arts and Sciences in the United States. The orchestra has received two awards.

Year	Nominee / work	Award	Result
2016	Son de Panamá	Best Tropical Latin Album	Won
2018	Salsa Big Band	Best Tropical Latin Album	Won
2021	SALSWING!	Best Tropical Latin Album	Won

=== Latin Grammy Awards ===
The Latin Grammy Awards are awarded annually by the Latin Academy of Recording Arts & Sciences in the United States. The orchestra has received five awards from six nominations.

Year	Nominee / work	Award	Result
2015	Son de Panamá	Album of the Year	Nominated
2015	Son de Panamá	Best Salsa Album	Won
2017	Salsa Big Band	Album of the Year	Won
2017	Salsa Big Band	Best Salsa Album	Won
2021	SALSWING!	Album of the Year	Won
2021	SALSA PLUS!	Best Salsa Album	Won
