= Salsa Big Band =

Studio album by Rubén Blades and Roberto Delgado & Orquesta
- Released: 29 April 2017
- Recorded: January–April 2017 at the PTY Studios Panamá (Panama City)
- Genre: Salsa
- Length: 50:30
- Language: Spanish
- Label: Rubén Blades Productions
- Producer: Roberto Delgado

Rubén Blades and Roberto Delgado & Orquesta chronology
Son de Panamá (2015)	Salsa Big Band (2017)	Medoro Madera (2018)

Salsa Big Band is the fourth studio album by Rubén Blades and Roberto Delgado & Orquesta, released on 29 April 2017 by Rubén Blades Productions. After the release of Son de Panamá in 2015, also recorded with Delgado & Orquesta, Blades decided to record another album with them, on which included eleven songs. He had previously recorded nine on the songs, and two were covers of songs written by Luis Demetrio and Rene Touzet. Delgado was the producer for the álbum. Blades' principal inspiration for the album was his admiration for the work of Puerto Ricans performers such as Tito Puente, Tito Rodríguez and Willie Rosario, and the big band sounds of the 1950s.

Salsa Big Band received favorable reviews from music critics, with critics praising Blades' vision and willingness "to try new sounds"; one said that Blades was "still at the top of the salsa world". At the 18th Annual Latin Grammy Awards, the album won for Album of the Year and Best Salsa Album; and at the 60th Annual Grammy Awards the record won for Best Tropical Latin Album.

== Background ==
Panamanian singer Rubén Blades recorded Son de Panamá with Roberto Delgado & Orquesta in 2015; it earned the Latin Grammy Award for Best Salsa Album and the Grammy Award for Best Tropical Latin Album. Salsa Big Band is the second album recorded by Blades with Delgado & Orquesta. It is mainly inspired by the musical work of Puerto Rican performers Tito Puente, Tito Rodríguez and Willie Rosario. According to Blades, "I decided to include more instruments to the arrangements, since I want to recover the Big band sound from the 1950s, with Stan Kenton, Machito and Mario Bauzá".

== Repertoire and recording ==
Salsa Big Band includes eleven tracks, nine written by Blades and two by other composers: "Apóyate en Mi Alma" by Luis Demetrio, and "No Te Importe Saber" by René Touzet. "Arayué" was written by Blades but first released by Ray Barretto in 1989, while "El Pescador" was recorded in 1970 by Blades with the Pete Rodríguez band. "Nadie Sabe", includes biographical lyrics by Blades, and was first recorded by Roberto Roena and the Apollo Sound in 1977. "La Marea" was recorded by Blades in 1988 and included on his album Antecedentes, while "Claro Oscuro" is taken from Agua de Luna (1987) and "Lo Pasado No Perdona" from El Que La Hace La Paga (1983). "Contra La Corriente" was previously recorded by Blades and Willie Colón for their album Tras la Tormenta (1995).

Rubén Blades Roberto Delgado & Orquesta "Arayué"
A 30 second sample of Blades and Roberto Delgado & Orquesta's "Arayué", the album opening track. They performed the song at the Latin Grammy Awards.

The album was recorded at the PTY Studios Panamá from January to April 2017, and was mixed by Ignacio Molino, Pablo Governatori and Roberto Delgado, and mastered by Daniel Ovie in Buenos Aires, Argentina. The songs "Claro Oscuro" and "La Marea" were recorded for this album in salsa, and "Lo Pasado No Perdona" is a bolero/montuno. "Antadilla" is a song about the daily tasks of a fisherman that guarantees his personal and family support that way. “El Pescador" is a montuno, with a flugelhorn solo by Wichy López. Delgado began working on the musical arrangements at the end of 2015, and went to record the album in January 2017. Delgado said of the creative process "Rubén [Blades] always contributes with innovative ideas to the music that is currently being made. This time he thought that it would be a great idea to recover the sound of the big bands, which is no longer done, since it is very difficult to have such a large orchestra and travel with it, then everyone tries to record with the minimum amount of instruments." Seventeen musicians worked on the recording, in addition to the backing singers, and some musicians played two or more instruments. The producers found it necessary to hire local musicians in order to "be faithful to its original sound." Delgado said to CBA24N.

== Reception ==
Upon its release, Salsa Big Band received favorable reviews from music critics. Omar Walker of Salsa Power named the album an "excellent recording" even though the singer showed some decline in his vocals. Walker said Blades' "vision as an artist pushes him to try new sounds". For Angel Romero of World Music Central, "Rubén Blades is still at the top of the salsa world", and the album is "a candidate for one of the best albums of the year". Roberto Carlos Lujan of Solar Latin Club was critical about the repertoire: "none of the versions of the songs previously recorded by Blades are enriched with innovative interpretative bets, with the exception of 'El Pescador'".

The album received two nominations for the 18th Annual Latin Grammy Awards, for Album of the Year and Best Salsa Album. Blades said to La Prensa that he took nominations very seriously since his album Siembra (which included his signature songs "Pedro Navaja" and "Plástico") was overlooked, "it is not that the album lost the award, it wasn't even nominated". Salsa Big Band won both accolades, and during his acceptance speech, Blades dedicated the award to his native Panama. Salsa Big Band also won for Best Tropical Latin Album at the 60th Annual Grammy Awards.

== Track listing ==
All tracks are written by Rubén Blades, except where noted.

Salsa Big Band track listing
No.	Title	Writer(s)	Arranger(s)	Length
1.	"Arayué"	Rubén Blades	Roberto Delgado	4:48
2.	"Apóyate en Mi Alma"	Luis Demetrio	Delgado	5:32
3.	"Nadie Sabe"	Blades	Delgado	4:58
4.	"Claro Oscuro"	Blades	Delgado	4:31
5.	"El Pasado No Perdona"	Blades	Delgado	6:22
6.	"La Marea"	Blades	Delgado	3:07
7.	"El Pescador"	Blades	Delgado	5:13
8.	"Antadilla"	Blades	Delgado	4:08
9.	"¿Adónde?"	Blades; Baden Goyo	Delgado	3:14
10.	"No Te Importe Saber"	René Touzet	Delgado	3:30
11.	"Como Un Huracán"	Blades	Delgado	5:02
Total length:				50:30

Notes

- Credits adapted from the album official website.

== Release history ==
Region	Date	Format	Edition(s)
Mexico	April 29, 2017	Digital download	Standard
United States	April 29, 2017	Digital download	Standard

== Credits and personnel ==
The following credits are from Salsa Big Band album liner notes.

=== Roberto Delgado & Orquesta ===
- Roberto Delgado; musical director, producer, arranger, bass and backing vocals
- Juan Berna; piano
- Marcos Barraza; congas and backing vocals
- Carlos Pérez-Bidó; timbales and backing vocals
- Raúl "Toto" Rivera; bongó, güiro, maracas and campana
- Ademir Berrocal; drums, bongó, campana and backing vocals
- Luis Enrique Becerra; keyboard and backing vocals
- Juan Carlos "Wichy" López; trumpet
- Alejandro "Chichisín" Castillo; trombone and trumpet
- Francisco Delvecchio; trombone
- Avenicio "Pin" Núñez; trombone
- Idígoras Bethancourt; trombone
- Carlos Ubarte; baritone saxophone, saxophone

=== Performance credits ===
- Rubén Blades; lead performer, vocals
- Ricky Rodríguez; piano
- Juan Carlos de León; piano
- Robinson Fereira; piano
- Pablo Governatori; drums

=== Technical credits ===
- Rubén Blades; executive producer
- Roberto Delgado; arranger, mixer and producer
- Ignacio Molino; mixer
- Pablo Governatori; mixer
- Daniel Ovie; mastering
- Luis Carlos García; photography
- Rodolfo Palomino; photography
- Orosmán de la Guardia; graphic design
