= Raíces (Gloria Estefan album) =

2025 studio album by Gloria Estefan

Studio album by Gloria Estefan
- Released: May 28, 2025
- Studios: Crescent Moon Studios; Criteria Recording Studios; L. Austin Weeks Center for Recording and Performance
- Genres: Latin pop; salsa; bolero; tropical
- Length: 45:40
- Languages: Spanish; English
- Labels: Crescent Moon Records; Sony Music Latin
- Producer: Emilio Estefan Jr.

Gloria Estefan chronology
Estefan Family Christmas (2022)	Raíces (2025)

Singles from Raíces
- 1. "Raíces" Released: March 20, 2025; 2. "La Vecina (No Sé Na')" Released: May 27, 2025; 3. "Chirriqui Chirri" Released: September 25, 2025

Raíces (Latin American Spanish: [raˈises], lit. 'Roots') is the sixteenth studio album by Cuban-American singer Gloria Estefan, released on May 28, 2025, by Crescent Moon Records and Sony Music Latin. Described by Estefan as a follow-up to her landmark 1993 Spanish-language debut Mi Tierra, it is her first Spanish-language album in 18 years, following 90 Millas released in 2007.

== Background ==
The concept for Raíces emerged a couple of years before its release when Emilio Estefan presented Gloria Estefan with the title track "Raíces". Gloria, who was simultaneously working on songs for the upcoming Broadway musical Basura with her daughter Emily Estefan, initially hesitated due to her focus on that project. However, recognizing the milestone of the fiftieth anniversary of her music career, she expressed interest in returning to tropical music in Spanish.

The album was produced by Estefan's husband Emilio Estefan Jr., who was also involved in most of its songwriting. Gloria contributed fewer songs, penning only "Mi Niño Bello (Para Sasha)", a lullaby dedicated to her grandson Sasha inspired by the classic Cuban lullaby "Drume Negrita". The album includes two English-language tracks, "My Beautiful Boy (For Sasha)" and "How Will You Be Remembered"; the latter is the English version of "Cuando el Tiempo Nos Castiga", originally recorded by Jon Secada in 2001.

== Critical reception ==
Writing for Entertainment Focus, journalist Pip Ellwood-Hughes praised Raíces, describing it as "a timeless album of the kind only Estefan is capable of making". He specifically praised the use of live instruments on the record, commenting that it "adds to the authenticity of the project and it's so refreshing at a time when most music is generated on a computer"; he mentioned "Chirriqui Chirri", "Te Juro", "Cuando el Tiempo Nos Castiga", "Agua Dulce", and "Mi Niño Bello (Para Sasha)" as standouts.

In 2026, the album won Best Tropical Latin Album at the 68th Annual Grammy Awards.

== Commercial performance ==
Raíces failed to enter the Billboard 200, but peaked at number 9 on the Tropical Albums chart, selling over 1,000 album-equivalent units in the United States.

== Track listing ==
Raíces track listing
No.	Title	Writer(s)	Length
1.	"Raíces"	Emilio Estefan Jr.	3:36
2.	"Yo Quiero Ser"	E. Estefan; Maria Carolina Garcia	3:09
3.	"La Vecina (No Sé Na')"	Ricardo Alberto Gaitán; E. Estefan; Gloria Estefan	3:17
4.	"Cómo Pasó"	E. Estefan	3:58
5.	"Tan Iguales y Tan Diferentes"	E. Estefan; Gian Marco Zignago	3:38
6.	"Chirriqui Chirri"	E. Estefan	3:03
7.	"Te Juro"	Gaitán; Alberto Mora Arriaga; David Mora Arriaga; Bruno Linares; E. Estefan; Judith Mora Arriaga; Levi Mora Arriaga; Tete Mora Arriaga; Meredith Mora Arriaga	3:15
8.	"Cuando el Tiempo Nos Castiga"	E. Estefan; Zignago	3:51
9.	"Agua Dulce"	Archie Peña; E. Estefan	3:36
10.	"Mi Niño Bello (Para Sasha)"	G. Estefan	3:18
11.	"Tú y Yo"	E. Estefan	3:54
12.	"My Beautiful Boy (For Sasha)"	G. Estefan	3:18
13.	"How Will You Be Remembered"	G. Estefan; E. Estefan; Zignago	3:47
Total length:			45:40

== Charts ==
Chart (2025)	Peak position
Spanish Albums (PROMUSICAE)	87
UK Album Downloads (Official Charts)	59
US Tropical Albums (Billboard)	9
