= Paulo Simeón =

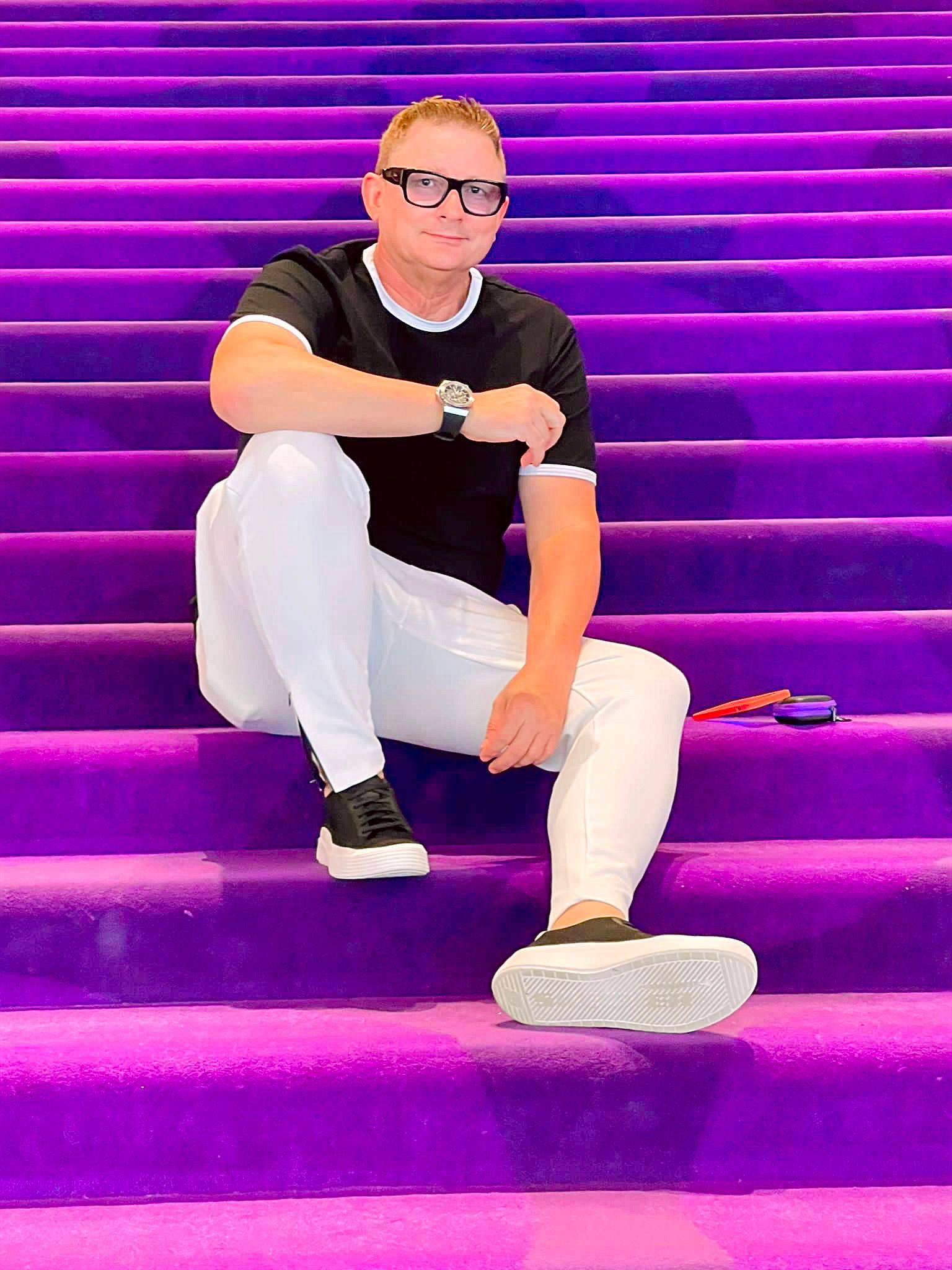

Background information
- Born: Havana, Cuba
- Genres: Latin jazz, timba, tropical fusion, cuban traditional music
- Occupations: Television producer, record producer, creative director, art director, artist manager
- Years active: 2010-present

Paulo Simeón is a Cuban-American record producer, television producer, creative director, artist manager and art director, known for his work with artists such as Aymée Nuviola, Paola Guanche, Maía, Fanny Lu, Chucho Valdés, Alexander Abreu, Paula Arenas, Majida Issa and Gonzalo Rubalcaba, among others. Some of the albums he has produced have won awards and nominations in events such as the Latin Grammy and Grammy Awards.

== Biography ==
Simeón was born in Havana, Cuba. After working as creative, distribution and marketing director at Univision Communications, he became president of Worldwide Entertainment and Productions Inc. Simeón is the manager of artists Aymée Nuviola and Paola Guanche, and has been in charge of the record production of albums like En la intimidad, First Class to Havana, Como anillo al dedo and A Journey to Cuban Music by Aymée Nuviola; Añorado encuentro by Lourdes Nuviola and Viento y tiempo by Gonzalo Rubalcaba and Aymée Nuviola.

In 2021 he produced Nuviola's album Sin salsa no hay paraíso with the participation of the Colombian singers Fanny Lu, Maía, Majida Issa and Paula Arenas. According to Nuviola, Simeón was in charge of "looking for the songs that were appropriate according to their popularity and affinity with my style as a singer". The album was accompanied by several video clips that were created and directed by Simeón.

Some of the albums he has produced have won awards and nominations, including a Latin Grammy Award for Como anillo al dedo, a Grammy Award for the album A Journey Through Cuban Music and Grammy nominations for Viento y tiempo and Sin salsa no hay paraíso, among others.

== Personal life ==
Simeón met Cuban singer and actress Aymée Nuviola in 2010 and married her a year later. The couple is currently based in Miami, Florida. Simeon has three daughters: Olivia, Zoey and Lolys, and his hobbies include golf, swimming, judo, baseball and painting.

== Discography ==
| Year | Album | Artist(s) | Role | Ref. |
|---|---|---|---|---|
| 2013 | En la intimidad | Aymeé Nuviola | Producer | |
| 2014 | First Class to Havana | Aymeé Nuviola | Producer, creative director, photography | |
| 2015 | Añorado encuentro | Lourdes Nuviola | Producer, art designer | |
| 2016 | El regreso a La Habana | Aymeé Nuviola | Producer, photography | |
| 2017 | Como anillo al dedo | Aymeé Nuviola | Producer | |
| 2019 | A Journey Through Cuban Music | Aymeé Nuviola | Producer | |
| 2020 | Viento y tiempo | Gonzalo Rubalcaba, Aymeé Nuviola | Producer, art designer | |
| 2021 | Sin salsa no hay paraíso | Aymeé Nuviola, Majida Issa, Fanny Lu, Maía, Paula Arenas | Producer, art designer | |
| 2021 | Skyline | Ron Carter, Jack DeJohnette, Gonzalo Rubalcaba | Cover designer | |

== Awards ==
Simeón participated in the production of the following award-winning works:

| Year | Award | Category | Work | Result | Ref. |
|---|---|---|---|---|---|
| 2012 | PromaxBDA Awards | Best marketing campaign | Univision on Demand | Won | |
| 2014 | Latin Grammy Awards | Best Salsa Album | First Class to Havana | Nominated | |
| 2015 | Grammy Awards | Best Tropical Latin Album | First Class to Havana | Won | |
| 2017 | Latin Grammy Awards | Best Tropical Fusion Album | Como anillo al dedo | Won | |
| 2019 | Grammy Awards | Best Tropical Latin Album | A Journey Through Cuban Music | Won | |
| 2020 | Grammy Awards | Best Latin Jazz Album | Viento y tiempo | Nominated | |
| 2021 | Grammy Awards | Best Tropical Latin Album | Sin salsa no hay paraíso | Nominated | |
