= Listen Here! (Eddie Palmieri album) =

Studio album by Eddie Palmieri
- Released: 2005
- Recorded: January 19–23, 2005
- Studio: Avatar Studios, New York City
- Genre: Latin Jazz
- Label: Concord Picante

Listen Here! is an album by Eddie Palmieri. In 2006, the album won Palmieri the Grammy Award for Best Latin Jazz Album.

== Track listing ==
1. "In Flight" (Palmieri) – 5:41
2. "Listen Here" (Eddie Harris) – 7:19
3. "Vals con Bata" (Palmieri) – 5:15
4. "Tema Para Eydie" (Palmieri) – 4:25
5. "Tin Tin Deo" (Gil Fuller, Chano Pozo) – 6:21
6. "In Walked Bud" (Thelonious Monk) – 5:59
7. "La Gitana" (Palmieri) – 7:15
8. "Nica's Dream" (Horace Silver) – 5:52
9. "Mira Flores" (Palmieri) – 5:49
10. "EP Blues" (Palmieri) – 8:18

== Personnel ==
- Eddie Palmieri - piano
- Nicholas Payton, Brian Lynch - trumpet
- Conrad Herwig, Doug Beavers - trombone
- Donald Harrison, Ivan Renta - alto saxophone
- Michael Brecker, David Sanchez - tenor saxophone
- John Scofield - guitar
- Regina Carter - violin
- John Benítez, Christian McBride - bass
- Horacio "El Negro" Hernández - drums
- Giovanni Hidalgo - percussion
