= Estefan Family Christmas =

Studio album by Gloria Estefan, Emily Estefan and Sasha Estefan-Coppola
- Released: October 13, 2022
- Studio: Crescent Moon Studios; Maurice Gusman Cultural Center; Talent Zone Acting Studio; Rottenbiller Studio
- Genre: Christmas music; Latin pop
- Language: English; Spanish
- Label: Crescent Moon Records; Sony Music Latin
- Producer: Emilio Estefan Jr.

Gloria Estefan chronology
Brazil305 (2020)	Estefan Family Christmas (2022)	Raíces (2025)

Estefan Family Christmas is a studio album by the Estefan family, led by Cuban-American singer Gloria Estefan. It was released on October 13, 2022, by Crescent Moon Records and Sony Music Latin. It is Estefan's second Christmas album and features performances by herself, her daughter Emily Estefan, her grandson Sasha Estefan-Coppola, as well as her husband, Emilio.

== Background ==
The album originated from the Estefan family's annual Thanksgiving gatherings at Gloria and Emilio Estefan's home in Miami Beach and Christmas Eve gatherings at the home of Emilio's niece, Lili Estefan. These gatherings included casual musical performances that began when Sasha—son of Gloria and Emilio Estefan's eldest child, Nayib, and his wife Lara Coppola—was about three or four years old. The idea of recording a Christmas album was first conceived during the COVID-19 pandemic, after Estefan's disappointment from two consecutive holiday seasons with canceled or scaled-back family gatherings. As Sasha approached his tenth birthday and his voice began to change, the family decided to record the project to capture his childhood voice before this happened. Apart from Sasha, the album includes contributions from daughter Emily Estefan, Gloria and Emilio's daughter. It also marked the professional singing debut of Estefan's husband, Emilio Estefan, who agreed to sing alongside with grandson on two tracks.

The album was recorded in July 2022 in Miami at Criteria Recording Studio in North Miami, the family's Crescent Moon Studios in South Miami, and the University of Miami Maurice Gusman Concert Hall. Musicians performed together live, with additional contributions from the Miami Children's Chorus and the Budapest Scoring Orchestra on several tracks. It contains 17 tracks, including covers of Christmas classics and original material.

== Promotion and release ==
The album was released on October 13, 2022. As part of the promotion for it, Gloria Estefan performed at the 98th annual Macy's Thanksgiving Day Parade and appeared at the “National Christmas Lighting Ceremony: Celebrating 100 Years,” which aired on CBS on December 11, 2022. At the time of the album's release, Estefan was also promoting her role in the 2022 HBO Max remake of Father of the Bride, apart from the regional tour of the autobiographical musical On Your Feet!.

== Critical reception ==
The New York Times included Estefan Family Christmas on their list of fresh takes on holiday albums, with music critic Lindsay Zoladz highlighting Emily Estefan's solo performance on the self-written ballad “When I Miss You Most” as a standout on the record, observing that she “sounds remarkably like her mother.” While the review suggested that the album relies “a bit too much on Sasha’s precocity,” it gave an overall good review on the family dynamic, describing how the LP finds the family “sharing the spotlight and the occasional laugh.” A particular highlight mentioned was the surprise Spanish-language rendition of Paul Williams's “I Wish I Could Be Santa Claus,” which features the “sweetly assured singing debut” of Gloria's husband, Emilio Estefan.

== Track listing ==
Estefan Family Christmas track listing
No.	Title	Writer(s)	Main performer(s)	Length
1.	"Wonderful Christmastime"	Paul McCartney	Gloria Estefan; Emily Estefan; Sasha Estefan-Coppola	4:30
2.	"Thankful"	G. Estefan; E. Estefan; S. Estefan-Coppola	G. Estefan; E. Estefan; S. Estefan-Coppola	4:03
3.	"Christmas Time Is Here"	Lee Mendelson; Vince Guaraldi	G. Estefan	3:28
4.	"I Saw Mommy Kissing Santa Claus"	Tommie Connor	S. Estefan-Coppola; Nayib Estefan; Lara Estefan-Coppola	2:49
5.	"Please Come Home For Christmas"	Charles Brown; Gene Redd	G. Estefan; E. Estefan; S. Estefan-Coppola	4:13
6.	"I Wish I Could Be Santa Claus"	Paul Williams	Emilio Estefan Jr.; S. Estefan-Coppola	3:17
7.	"My Favorite Things"	Oscar Hammerstein II; Richard Rodgers	G. Estefan; E. Estefan; S. Estefan-Coppola	3:47
8.	"Run, Little St. Nick (Note: Uses parts of "Run Rudolph Run" and "Little Saint Nick.")"	Mike Love; Brian Wilson; Johnny Marks; Marvin Brodie	G. Estefan; E. Estefan; S. Estefan-Coppola	3:34
9.	"The Chipmunk Song (Christmas Don't Be Late)"	Ross Bagdasarian	G. Estefan; E. Estefan; S. Estefan-Coppola	2:41
10.	"Last Christmas"	George Michael	G. Estefan; E. Estefan; S. Estefan-Coppola	3:58
11.	"It's A Marshmallow World"	Carl Sigman; Peter DeRose	S. Estefan-Coppola	2:23
12.	"When I Miss You Most"	E. Estefan; Jon Secada; Rachel Perry; Willy Perez Feria	E. Estefan	3:46
13.	"Happy Xmas (War Is Over)"	John Lennon; Yoko Ono	G. Estefan; E. Estefan; S. Estefan-Coppola	4:34
14.	"Quisiera Yo Ser Santa Claus (Note: Spanish version of "I Wish I Could Be Santa Claus.")"	Paul Williams; G. Estefan (Note: Credited for lyrics adaptation.)	E. Estefan Jr.; S. Estefan-Coppola	3:17
15.	"Doy Gracias Por Ti (Note: Spanish version of "Thankful.")"	G. Estefa; E. Estefan; S. Estefan-Coppola	G. Estefan; E. Estefan; S. Estefan-Coppola	4:04
16.	"Cuando Te Extraño Más (Note: Spanish version of "When I Miss You Most.")"	E. Estefan; Secada; Perry; Perez Feria	E. Estefan	3:53
17.	"I Saw Mommy Kissing Santa Claus" (Sasha's Edit)	Connor	S. Estefan-Coppola; N. Estefan; L. Estefan-Coppola	2:49
Total length:				61:06
