= David Ollier Weber =

American novelist and journalist

- Born: February 28, 1938 (age 88); Cincinnati, Ohio, U.S.
- Spouse: Christine Leigh-Taylor
- Children: Nicholas Weber, Alexa Weber Morales, Peter Weber, Erec-Michael Weber
- Relatives: John C. Weber
- Writing career
- Language: English, French, Spanish, Norwegian
- Genres: literary fiction, non-fiction, journalism, short story
- Notable works: Vanity; Oakland, Hub of the West

David Ollier Weber (born February 28, 1938) is an American novelist and journalist based in Northern California.

== Biography ==
David Weber has written works of fiction including short stories and novels. He has been a Navy officer, a seaman on a Norwegian freighter, and small-craft sailor. His experiences were used in some of his short stories such as "California Standard". Weber later worked as newspaper reporter. He was an editor for the Port of Oakland.

Weber was a free-lance reporter for forty years. He covered Northern California-specific topics of wildfire management. In 2002, Weber founded Kila Springs as both a publishing imprint, and to provide editorial services ranging from reporting and writing to photography and production.

== Personal life ==
Weber was born and spent his early life in Cincinnati. He moved to Berkeley, California in 1964 after serving four years in naval service. Weber now lives with his wife in Placerville, near Sutter's Mill. Prior to Placerville, Weber was known as “an erudite resident of Comptche”, a town outside of Mendocino, California. His daughter, Alexa Weber Morales, is a Grammy Award-winning salsa/jazz singer-songwriter and freelance writer. His son Erec-Michael Ollier Weber is the author of the children's book Bryce and the Blood Ninjas.

== Novels ==
- Vanity, Mendocino: Kila Springs Press, 2002 ISBN 0971648107
- Baja, Mendocino: Kila Springs Press, 2006 ISBN 0971648123
- Catch/Release, Placerville: Kila Springs Press, 2010 ISBN 0971648158
- My Life in Sports (five novellas), Placerville: Kila Springs Press, 2012 ISBN 097164814X

== Short stories ==
- Family Fun (collection), Mendocino: Kila Springs Press, 2006 ISBN 0971648131
- Included in Family Fun, “California Standard” was initially published in The Antioch Review (Winter 1977)
- Bad Trips (collection), Placerville: Kila Springs Press, 2012 ISBN 0971648182
- Included in Bad Trips, “American Pastime” was initially published in Evergreen Review, November 1970, with illustration by Philip Hays

== Non-fiction ==
- Oakland, Hub of the West, Tulsa: Continental Heritage Press, 1981. Out of print. ISBN 0932986161
- Accustomed to Hope: The Episcopal Church on the Mendocino Coast, Mendocino: Kila Springs Press, 2003 ISBN 0971648115

== Awards ==
- Gold Quill Award, 1978
- NIHCM 8th Annual Health Care Print Journalism Award, $10,000 prize
