= Dancing with the Stars (American TV series) season 8 =

Dancing with the Stars
- Season 8
- Promotional poster, featuring former pro dancer Edyta Śliwińska
- Hosted by: Tom Bergeron; Samantha Harris
- Judges: Carrie Ann Inaba; Len Goodman; Bruno Tonioli
- Celebrity winner: Shawn Johnson
- Professional winner: Mark Ballas
- No. of episodes: 21

Release
- Original network: ABC
- Original release: March 9 – May 19, 2009

Season chronology
- ← Previous; Season 7 Next → Season 9

Season eight of Dancing with the Stars premiered on Monday, March 9, 2009, on the ABC network.

The show generally followed the format of previous seasons, with thirteen couples, although there were some changes, including two new dances, the Argentine tango and Lindy Hop, and an occasional dance-off between the bottom two couples, in order to determine who would be eliminated.

Olympic gymnast Shawn Johnson and Mark Ballas were crowned the champions, while Gilles Marini and Cheryl Burke finished in second place, and Melissa Rycroft and Tony Dovolani finished third.

== Cast ==
=== Couples ===
This season featured thirteen celebrity contestants. This season was originally advertised as the first American season where a husband and wife would compete against each other: rodeo champion Ty Murray and singer-songwriter Jewel. However, Jewel fractured both of her tibiae and was unable to compete. She was replaced by Holly Madison. Murray chose to continue on the show, while Jewel appeared during the season as a special musical guest. Nancy O'Dell, then co-host of Access Hollywood, was also originally announced to be on the show, but was forced to withdraw from the competition due to a torn meniscus, which required surgery. She was replaced by Melissa Rycroft, who had won season 13 of The Bachelor.

Celebrity	Notability	Professional partner	Status
Belinda Carlisle	Singer-songwriter	Jonathan Roberts	Eliminated 1st on March 17, 2009
Denise Richards	Actress	Maksim Chmerkovskiy	Eliminated 2nd on March 24, 2009
Holly Madison	Playboy model & reality television personality	Dmitry Chaplin	Eliminated 3rd on March 31, 2009
Steve Wozniak	Apple co-founder	Karina Smirnoff	Eliminated 4th on March 31, 2009
David Alan Grier	Actor & comedian	Kym Johnson	Eliminated 5th on April 7, 2009
Steve-O	Jackass star	Lacey Schwimmer	Eliminated 6th on April 14, 2009
Lawrence Taylor	NFL linebacker	Edyta Śliwińska	Eliminated 7th on April 21, 2009
Chuck Wicks	Country singer	Julianne Hough	Eliminated 8th on April 28, 2009
Lil' Kim	Rapper	Derek Hough	Eliminated 9th on May 5, 2009
Ty Murray	Rodeo cowboy	Chelsie Hightower	Eliminated 10th on May 12, 2009
Melissa Rycroft	The Bachelor contestant	Tony Dovolani	Third place on May 19, 2009
Gilles Marini	Actor	Cheryl Burke	Runners-up on May 19, 2009
Shawn Johnson	Olympic artistic gymnast	Mark Ballas	Winners on May 19, 2009

Future appearances

Shawn Johnson, Gilles Marini, and Melissa Rycroft later competed in the All-Stars season, where Johnson was paired with Derek Hough, Marini was paired with Peta Murgatroyd, and Rycroft remained with Tony Dovolani.

=== Host and judges ===
The show was again co-hosted by Tom Bergeron and Samantha Harris. Len Goodman, Bruno Tonioli and Carrie Ann Inaba returned as judges.

== Scoring chart ==
The highest score each week is indicated in bold green with a dagger (†), while the lowest score each week is indicated in italicized red with a double-dagger (‡).

Color key:

Winners
Runners-up
Third place
Bottom two
Eliminated

Dancing with the Stars (season 8) - Weekly scores
Couple	Pl.	Week												
Couple	Pl.	1	2	1+2	3	4	5	6	7	8	9	10	11	
Couple	Pl.	1	2	1+2	3	4	5	6	7	8	9	10	Night 1	Night 2
Shawn & Mark	1st	23	24	47	**27**†	25	26	26	28	27+25=52	27+29=56	30+26=56	28+30=**58**†	+30=**88**† (Note: This couple finished in first place.)
Gilles & Cheryl	2nd	**24**†	**27**†	**51**†	**27**†	**30**†	**29**†	26	27	27+28=55	29+27=56	30+30=**60**†	30+28=**58**†	+30=**88**† (Note: This couple finished in second place.)
Melissa & Tony	3rd	23	26	49	**27**†	29	25	27	**29**†	21+25=46‡	27+30=**57**†	28+27=55	29+27=56‡	+30=86‡ (Note: This couple finished in third place.)
Ty & Chelsie	4th	14	20	34	23	25	21	18	24	24+28=52	25+21=46‡ (Note: This couple was in the bottom two, but was not eliminated.)	25+23=48‡ (Note: This couple was eliminated.)		
Lil' Kim & Derek	5th	21	23	44	25	27	26	**28**†	26	28+28=**56**†	25+27=52			
Chuck & Julianne	6th	20	20	40	23	22	23	23	27	26+25=51				
Lawrence & Edyta	7th	16	20	36	20	19	20	22	21‡					
Steve-O & Lacey	8th	17	14‡	31	15	15	18‡	16‡						
David & Kym	9th	19	17	36	24	22	22							
Steve & Karina	10th	13‡	17	30‡	10‡	12‡								
Holly & Dmitry	11th	18	18	36	17	16								
Denise & Maks	12th	18	21	39	16									
Belinda & Jonathan	13th	17	18	35										

== Weekly scores ==
Individual judges scores in charts below (given in parentheses) are listed in this order from left to right: Carrie Ann Inaba, Len Goodman, Bruno Tonioli.

=== Week 1 ===
Each couple performed either the cha-cha-cha or waltz. Couples are listed in the order they performed.

Couple	Scores	Dance	Music
Lil' Kim & Derek	21 (7, 7, 7)	Cha-cha-cha	"Nasty" — Janet Jackson
Belinda & Jonathan	17 (6, 6, 5)	Waltz	"What the World Needs Now Is Love" — Jackie DeShannon
Lawrence & Edyta	16 (6, 5, 5)	Cha-cha-cha	"Twenty-Five Miles" — Edwin Starr
Steve-O & Lacey	17 (6, 5, 6)	Waltz	"Vito's Waltz" — 101 Strings Orchestra
Gilles & Cheryl	24 (8, 8, 8)	Cha-cha-cha	"Addicted to Love" — Robert Palmer
Chuck & Julianne	20 (6, 7, 7)	Waltz	"Are You Lonesome Tonight?" — Elvis Presley
Holly & Dmitry	18 (6, 6, 6)	Cha-cha-cha	"Just Dance" — Lady Gaga, feat. Colby O'Donis
Ty & Chelsie	14 (5, 4, 5)	Cha-cha-cha	"Train in Vain" — The Clash
Shawn & Mark	23 (8, 8, 7)	Waltz	"It is You (I Have Loved)" — Dana Glover
Steve & Karina	13 (5, 4, 4)	Cha-cha-cha	"You Ain't Seen Nothing Yet" — Bachman-Turner Overdrive
David & Kym	19 (6, 7, 6)	Waltz	"You Light Up My Life" — Debby Boone
Denise & Maks	18 (6, 6, 6)	Cha-cha-cha	"Nothin' but a Good Time" — Poison
Melissa & Tony	23 (8, 7, 8)	Waltz	"Moon River" — Andy Williams

=== Week 2 ===
Each couple performed either the quickstep or salsa. The two couples in the bottom two competed against each other in a dance-off to determine which would also be eliminated. Couples are listed in the order they performed.

Due to an injury, Steve-O was unable to dance on the live show, so his rehearsal footage was shown and scored instead.

Couple	Scores	Dance	Music	Result
Holly & Dmitry	18 (6, 6, 6)	Quickstep	"We Are in Love" — Harry Connick Jr.	Safe
David & Kym	17 (6, 5, 6)	Salsa	"El Cumbanchero" — Angel Meléndez and the 911 Mambo Orchestra	Safe
Denise & Maks	21 (7, 7, 7)	Quickstep	"We Go Together" — from Grease	Safe
Belinda & Jonathan	18 (6, 6, 6)	Salsa	"Higher" — Gloria Estefan	Bottom two
Ty & Chelsie	20 (7, 6, 7)	Quickstep	"Life Is a Highway" — Rascal Flatts	Safe
Shawn & Mark	24 (8, 8, 8)	Salsa	"Las Muchachas" — Johnny Pacheco	Safe
Steve & Karina	17 (6, 5, 6)	Quickstep	"Oh, Boy!" — Buddy Holly	Bottom two
Chuck & Julianne	20 (6, 7, 7)	Salsa	"Say Hey (I Love You)" — Michael Franti & Spearhead	Safe
Lawrence & Edyta	20 (7, 6, 7)	Quickstep	"As Long as I'm Singing" — The Brian Setzer Orchestra	Safe
Steve-O & Lacey	14 (5, 4, 5)	Salsa	"Cobrastyle" — Teddybears	Safe
Lil' Kim & Derek	23 (8, 7, 8)	Quickstep	"Diamonds Are a Girl's Best Friend" — Marilyn Monroe	Safe
Melissa & Tony	26 (9, 8, 9)	Salsa	"The Cup of Life" — Ricky Martin	Safe
Gilles & Cheryl	27 (9, 9, 9)	Quickstep	"Kryptonite" — 3 Doors Down	Safe

Dance-off
Couple	Scores	Dance	Music	Result
Belinda & Jonathan	17 (5, 6, 6)	Salsa	"Higher" — Gloria Estefan	Eliminated
Steve & Karina	17 (6, 5, 6)	Quickstep	"Oh, Boy!" — Buddy Holly	Safe

=== Week 3 ===
Each couple performed either the foxtrot or samba. The two couples in the bottom two competed against each other in a dance-off to determine which would also be eliminated. Couples are listed in the order they performed.

Couple	Scores	Dance	Music	Result
Denise & Maks	16 (5, 6, 5)	Samba	"Take a Picture" — Filter	Bottom two
Chuck & Julianne	23 (8, 7, 8)	Foxtrot	"All I Want To Do" — Sugarland	Safe
Holly & Dmitry	17 (5, 6, 6)	Samba	"Bananza (Belly Dancer)" — Akon	Bottom two
Steve-O & Lacey	15 (5, 5, 5)	Foxtrot	"I'm Yours" — Jason Mraz	Safe
Lawrence & Edyta	20 (7, 6, 7)	Samba	"I Can't Get Next To You" — The Temptations	Safe
Shawn & Mark	27 (9, 9, 9)	Foxtrot	"More Than This" — Norah Jones	Safe
Gilles & Cheryl	27 (9, 9, 9)	Samba	"El Matador" — Los Fabulosos Cadillacs	Safe
David & Kym	24 (8, 8, 8)	Foxtrot	"Come Rain or Come Shine" — Natalie Cole	Safe
Steve & Karina	10 (4, 3, 3)	Samba	"Jump in the Line (Shake, Senora)" — Harry Belafonte	Safe
Melissa & Tony	27 (9, 9, 9)	Foxtrot	"Recipe for Love" — Harry Connick Jr.	Safe
Lil' Kim & Derek	25 (8, 8, 9)	Samba	"Remedio P'al Corazon" — Alberto Plaza	Safe
Ty & Chelsie	23 (8, 8, 7)	Foxtrot	"Come Dance with Me" — Frank Sinatra	Safe

Dance-off
Couple	Scores	Dance	Music	Result
Holly & Dmitry	18 (6, 6, 6)	Samba	"Bananza (Belly Dancer)" — Akon	Safe
Denise & Maks	20 (6, 7, 7)	Samba	"Take a Picture" — Filter	Eliminated

=== Week 4 ===
Each couple performed either the Argentine tango or Lindy Hop. Two couples were eliminated at the end of the night. Couples are listed in the order they performed.

Couple	Scores	Dance	Music	Result
David & Kym	22 (8, 7, 7)	Lindy Hop	"Bandstand Boogie" — Barry Manilow	Safe
Lil' Kim & Derek	27 (9, 8, 10)	Argentine tango	"Taquito Militar" — Conjunto Tipico Del Tango	Safe
Chuck & Julianne	22 (8, 7, 7)	Lindy Hop	"Summertime Blues" — Brian Setzer	Safe
Lawrence & Edyta	19 (7, 5, 7)	Argentine tango	"Suite Punta Del Este" — Ástor Piazzolla	Safe
Ty & Chelsie	25 (9, 8, 8)	Lindy Hop	"You and Me and the Bottle Makes 3 Tonight (Baby)" — Big Bad Voodoo Daddy	Safe
Steve & Karina	12 (4, 4, 4)	Argentine tango	"Cité Tango" — Gotan Project	Eliminated
Melissa & Tony	29 (10, 9, 10)	Lindy Hop	"Brown Derby Jump" — Cherry Poppin' Daddies	Safe
Holly & Dmitry	16 (5, 6, 5)	Argentine tango	"Libertango" — Bond	Eliminated
Steve-O & Lacey	15 (5, 5, 5)	Lindy Hop	"Dance Little Sister" — The Rolling Stones	Bottom three
Gilles & Cheryl	30 (10, 10, 10)	Argentine tango	"Assassin's Tango" — John Powell	Safe
Shawn & Mark	25 (8, 8, 9)	Lindy Hop	"Ready Teddy" — Little Richard	Safe

=== Week 5 ===
Each couple performed either the paso doble or Viennese waltz. The two couples in the bottom two competed against each other in a dance-off to determine which would also be eliminated. Couples are listed in the order they performed.

Couple	Scores	Dance	Music	Result
Chuck & Julianne	23 (7, 8, 8)	Viennese waltz	"Feels Like Today" — Rascal Flatts	Safe
Lawrence & Edyta	20 (6, 7, 7)	Paso doble	"Granada" — Agustín Lara	Bottom two
Shawn & Mark	26 (9, 8, 9)	Viennese waltz	"Ordinary Day" — Vanessa Carlton	Safe
Melissa & Tony	25 (8, 8, 9)	Paso doble	"Poker Face" — Lady Gaga	Safe
David & Kym	22 (7, 8, 7)	Viennese waltz	"I Put a Spell on You" — Screamin' Jay Hawkins	Bottom two
Gilles & Cheryl	29 (10, 9, 10)	Paso doble	"Habanera" — Charlotte Church	Safe
Steve-O & Lacey	18 (6, 6, 6)	Viennese waltz	"Complainte de la Butte" — Rufus Wainwright	Safe
Ty & Chelsie	21 (7, 7, 7)	Paso doble	"Barracuda" — Heart	Safe
Lil' Kim & Derek	26 (9, 8, 9)	Viennese waltz	"I'll Be" — Edwin McCain	Safe

Dance-off
Couple	Scores	Dance	Music	Result
David & Kym	24 (8, 8, 8)	Viennese waltz	"I Put a Spell on You" — Screamin' Jay Hawkins	Eliminated
Lawrence & Edyta	20 (6, 7, 7)	Paso doble	"Granada" — Agustín Lara	Safe

=== Week 6 ===
Each couple performed either the jive or rumba. Couples are listed in the order they performed.

Couple	Scores	Dance	Music	Result
Ty & Chelsie	18 (6, 6, 6)	Jive	"The Girl's Gone Wild" — Travis Tritt	Safe
Shawn & Mark	26 (8, 9, 9)	Rumba	"Slow Dancing in a Burning Room" — John Mayer	Safe
Lawrence & Edyta	22 (7, 7, 8)	Jive	"Ain't That Peculiar" — Marvin Gaye	Safe
Melissa & Tony	27 (9, 9, 9)	Rumba	"If I Were a Boy" — Beyoncé	Safe
Lil' Kim & Derek	28 (10, 8, 10)	Jive	"Jailhouse Rock" — Elvis Presley	Safe
Steve-O & Lacey	16 (7, 4, 5)	Rumba	"Fall for You" — Secondhand Serenade	Eliminated
Gilles & Cheryl	26 (9, 8, 9)	Jive	"Dance, Dance" — Fall Out Boy	Safe
Chuck & Julianne	23 (8, 7, 8)	Rumba	"She Will Be Loved" — Maroon 5	Safe

=== Week 7 ===
Each couple performed one unlearned dance, and they all participated in a group swing dance. Couples are listed in the order they performed.

Couple	Scores	Dance	Music	Result
Melissa & Tony	29 (10, 9, 10)	Argentine tango	"Mi Confesión" — Gotan Project	Safe
Lawrence & Edyta	21 (7, 7, 7)	Waltz	"Open Arms" — Journey	Eliminated
Lil' Kim & Derek	26 (9, 8, 9)	Rumba	"Lost Without U" — Robin Thicke	Safe
Chuck & Julianne	27 (9, 9, 9)	Samba	"Bailá, Bailá" — Angela Via, feat. Joe Budden	Safe
Ty & Chelsie	24 (8, 8, 8)	Waltz	"Strawberry Wine" — Deana Carter	Safe
Shawn & Mark	28 (9, 9, 10)	Cha-cha-cha	"P.Y.T. (Pretty Young Thing)" — Michael Jackson	Safe
Gilles & Cheryl	27 (9, 9, 9)	Viennese waltz	"I Go to Sleep" — The Pretenders	Safe
Chuck & Julianne Gilles & Cheryl Lawrence & Edyta Lil' Kim & Derek Melissa & Tony Shawn & Mark Ty & Chelsie	No scores received	Group; Swing	"The Clapping Song" — Shirley Ellis	

=== Week 8 ===
Each couple performed one unlearned dance, plus participated in a group dance. Couples are listed in the order they performed.

Due to an injury, Melissa Rycroft was unable to perform her jive or participate in the team dance on the live show. Lacey Schwimmer filled in for her on the team dance, while Rycroft's rehearsal footage for her jive was shown and scored instead.

Couple	Scores	Dance	Music	Result
Gilles & Cheryl	27 (9, 9, 9)	Lindy Hop	"Go Daddy-O" — Big Bad Voodoo Daddy	Safe
Lil' Kim & Derek	28 (9, 9, 10)	Paso doble	"El gato montés" — Manuel Penella	Safe
Chuck & Julianne	26 (9, 9, 8)	Cha-cha-cha	"I'm Outta Love" — Anastacia	Eliminated
Shawn & Mark	27 (10, 8, 9)	Samba	"Get Down on It" — Kool and the Gang	Safe
Melissa & Tony	21 (7, 7, 7)	Jive	"We Got the Beat" — The Go-Go's	Safe
Ty & Chelsie	24 (9, 7, 8)	Salsa	"Vehicle" — The Ides of March	Safe
Chuck & Julianne Lacey & Tony Shawn & Mark	25 (8, 8, 9)	Team Mambo	"Single Ladies (Put a Ring on It)" — Beyoncé	
Gilles & Cheryl Lil' Kim & Derek Ty & Chelsie	28 (9, 9, 10)	Team Tango	"Womanizer" — Britney Spears	

=== Week 9 ===
Each couple performed two unlearned dances. Couples are listed in the order they performed.

Couple	Scores	Dance	Music	Result
Shawn & Mark	27 (9, 9, 9)	Quickstep	"Friend Like Me" — Robin Williams	Safe
Shawn & Mark	29 (10, 9, 10)	Paso doble	"Gotta Get thru This" — Daniel Bedingfield	Safe
Ty & Chelsie	25 (8, 9, 8)	Argentine tango	"Amor que se baila" — Otros Aires	Bottom two
Ty & Chelsie	21 (7, 7, 7)	Rumba	"Free Fallin'" — Tom Petty	Bottom two
Lil' Kim & Derek	25 (8, 9, 8)	Waltz	"When I Need You" — Leo Sayer	Eliminated
Lil' Kim & Derek	27 (9, 9, 9)	Salsa	"Por Arriba, Por Abajo" — Ricky Martin	Eliminated
Gilles & Cheryl	29 (10, 9, 10)	Foxtrot	"Fever" — Peggy Lee	Safe
Gilles & Cheryl	27 (9, 9, 9)	Rumba	"Sexual Healing" — Marvin Gaye	Safe
Melissa & Tony	27 (9, 9, 9)	Viennese waltz	"Angel" — Sarah McLachlan	Safe
Melissa & Tony	30 (10, 10, 10)	Samba	"Jaleo" — Ricky Martin	Safe

=== Week 10 ===
Each couple performed two unlearned dances. Couples are listed in the order they performed.

Couple	Scores	Dance	Music	Result
Melissa & Tony	28 (9, 10, 9)	Quickstep	"I Got Rhythm" — Ella Fitzgerald	Safe
Melissa & Tony	27 (9, 9, 9)	Cha-cha-cha	"Save the Last Dance for Me" — Ben E. King	Safe
Gilles & Cheryl	30 (10, 10, 10)	Waltz	"Come Away with Me" — Norah Jones	Safe
Gilles & Cheryl	30 (10, 10, 10)	Salsa	"I Know You Want Me (Calle Ocho)" — Pitbull	Safe
Shawn & Mark	30 (10, 10, 10)	Argentine tango	"Asi se Baila el Tango" — Bailongo	Safe
Shawn & Mark	26 (9, 8, 9)	Jive	"Reet Petite" — Jackie Wilson	Safe
Ty & Chelsie	25 (8, 9, 8)	Viennese waltz	"Tuesday's Gone" — Lynyrd Skynyrd	Eliminated
Ty & Chelsie	23 (8, 7, 8)	Samba	"Concrete and Clay" — Unit 4 + 2	Eliminated

=== Week 11: Finals ===
On the first night, each couple competed in a group paso doble, where they each received their own set of scores, and then performed their freestyle routines. On the second night, each couple performed their favorite dance of the season. Couples are listed in the order they performed.

Night 1

Couple	Scores	Dance	Music
Shawn & Mark	28 (9, 9, 10)	Group; Paso doble	"So What" — Pink
Melissa & Tony	29 (10, 9, 10)	Group; Paso doble	"So What" — Pink
Gilles & Cheryl	30 (10, 10, 10)	Group; Paso doble	"So What" — Pink
Shawn & Mark	30 (10, 10, 10)	Freestyle	"Do Your Thing" — Basement Jaxx
Melissa & Tony	27 (9, 9, 9)	Freestyle	"Gonna Make You Sweat (Everybody Dance Now)" — C+C Music Factory
Gilles & Cheryl	28 (9, 10, 9)	Freestyle	"Flashdance (What a Feeling)" — Irene Cara

Night 2

Couple	Scores	Dance	Music	Result
Shawn & Mark	30 (10, 10, 10)	Cha-cha-cha	"P.Y.T. (Pretty Young Thing)" — Michael Jackson	Winners
Melissa & Tony	30 (10, 10, 10)	Samba	"Jaleo" — Ricky Martin	Third place
Gilles & Cheryl	30 (10, 10, 10)	Argentine tango	"Assassin's Tango" — John Powell	Runners-up

== Dance chart ==
The couples performed the following each week:

- Week 1: One unlearned dance (cha-cha-cha or waltz)
- Week 2: One unlearned dance (quickstep or salsa)
- Week 3: One unlearned dance (foxtrot or samba)
- Week 4: One unlearned dance (Argentine tango or Lindy Hop)
- Week 5: One unlearned dance (paso doble or Viennese waltz)
- Week 6: One unlearned dance (jive or rumba)
- Week 7: One unlearned dance & swing group dance
- Week 8: One unlearned dance & team dance
- Week 9: Two unlearned dances
- Week 10: Two unlearned dances
- Week 11 (Night 1): Group paso doble & freestyle
- Week 11 (Night 2): Favorite dance of the season

Color key:

No scores received.

Dancing with the Stars (season 8) - Dance chart
Couple	Week																
Couple	1	2	3	4	5	6	7		8		9		10		11		
Couple	1	2	3	4	5	6	7		8		9		10		Night 1		Night 2
Shawn & Mark	Waltz	Salsa	Foxtrot	Lindy Hop	Viennese waltz	Rumba	Cha-cha-cha	Group Swing (Note: No scores were received for this dance.)	Samba	Team; Mambo	Quickstep	Paso doble	Argentine tango	Jive	Group; Paso doble	Freestyle	Cha-cha-cha
Gilles & Cheryl	Cha-cha-cha	Quickstep	Samba	Argentine tango	Paso doble	Jive	Viennese waltz	Group Swing	Lindy Hop	Team; Tango	Foxtrot	Rumba	Waltz	Salsa	Group; Paso doble	Freestyle	Argentine tango
Melissa & Tony	Waltz	Salsa	Foxtrot	Lindy Hop	Paso doble	Rumba	Argentine tango	Group Swing	Jive	Team; Mambo	Viennese waltz	Samba	Quickstep	Cha-cha-cha	Group; Paso doble	Freestyle	Samba
Ty & Chelsie	Cha-cha-cha	Quickstep	Foxtrot	Lindy Hop	Paso doble	Jive	Waltz	Group Swing	Salsa	Team; Tango	Argentine tango	Rumba	Viennese waltz	Samba			
Lil' Kim & Derek	Cha-cha-cha	Quickstep	Samba	Argentine tango	Viennese waltz	Jive	Rumba	Group Swing	Paso doble	Team; Tango	Waltz	Salsa					
Chuck & Julianne	Waltz	Salsa	Foxtrot	Lindy Hop	Viennese waltz	Rumba	Samba	Group Swing	Cha-cha-cha	Team; Mambo							
Lawrence & Edyta	Cha-cha-cha	Quickstep	Samba	Argentine tango	Paso doble	Jive	Waltz	Group Swing									
Steve-O & Lacey	Waltz	Salsa	Foxtrot	Lindy Hop	Viennese waltz	Rumba											
David & Kym	Waltz	Salsa	Foxtrot	Lindy Hop	Viennese waltz												
Steve & Karina	Cha-cha-cha	Quickstep	Samba	Argentine tango													
Holly & Dmitry	Cha-cha-cha	Quickstep	Samba	Argentine tango													
Denise & Maksim	Cha-cha-cha	Quickstep	Samba														
Belinda & Jonathan	Waltz	Salsa															

== Ratings ==
Viewership and ratings per episode of Dancing with the Stars (American TV series) season 8
No.	Title	Air date	Timeslot (ET)	Rating/share (18–49)	Viewers (millions)
1	"Episode 801"	March 9, 2009	Monday 8:00 p.m.	6.1/15	22.83
2	"Episode 802"	March 16, 2009	Monday 8:00 p.m.	5.3/14	21.22
3	"Episode 802A"	March 17, 2009	Tuesday 9:00 p.m.	2.8/7	12.74
4	"Episode 803"	March 23, 2009	Monday 8:00 p.m.	5.0/13	20.34
5	"Episode 803A"	March 24, 2009	Tuesday 9:00 p.m.	3.9/10	16.12
6	"Episode 804"	March 30, 2009	Monday 8:00 p.m.	4.9/12	20.48
7	"Episode 804A"	March 31, 2009	Tuesday 9:00 p.m.	3.1/8	13.51
8	"Episode 805"	April 6, 2009	Monday 8:00 p.m.	4.6/12	19.88
9	"Episode 805A"	April 7, 2009	Tuesday 9:00 p.m.	3.3/8	14.56
10	"Episode 806"	April 13, 2009	Monday 8:00 p.m.	—N/a	19.46
11	"Episode 806A"	April 14, 2009	Tuesday 9:00 p.m.	—N/a	15.24
12	"Episode 807"	April 20, 2009	Monday 8:00 p.m.	4.7/12	20.53
13	"Episode 807A"	April 21, 2009	Tuesday 9:00 p.m.	3.2/8	14.72
14	"Episode 808"	April 27, 2009	Monday 8:00 p.m.	4.3/11	19.23
15	"Episode 808A"	April 28, 2009	Tuesday 9:00 p.m.	3.3/8	14.72
16	"Episode 809"	May 4, 2009	Monday 8:00 p.m.	4.9/13	20.28
17	"Episode 809A"	May 5, 2009	Tuesday 9:00 p.m.	3.2/8	14.56
18	"Episode 810"	May 11, 2009	Monday 8:00 p.m.	4.2/11	18.55
19	"Episode 810A"	May 12, 2009	Tuesday 9:00 p.m.	3.1/8	14.06
20	"Episode 811"	May 18, 2009	Monday 8:00 p.m.	4.4/13	19.17
21	"Episode 811A"	May 19, 2009	Tuesday 9:00 p.m.	5.2/14	20.31
