= PALO! =

Afro-Cuban funk band

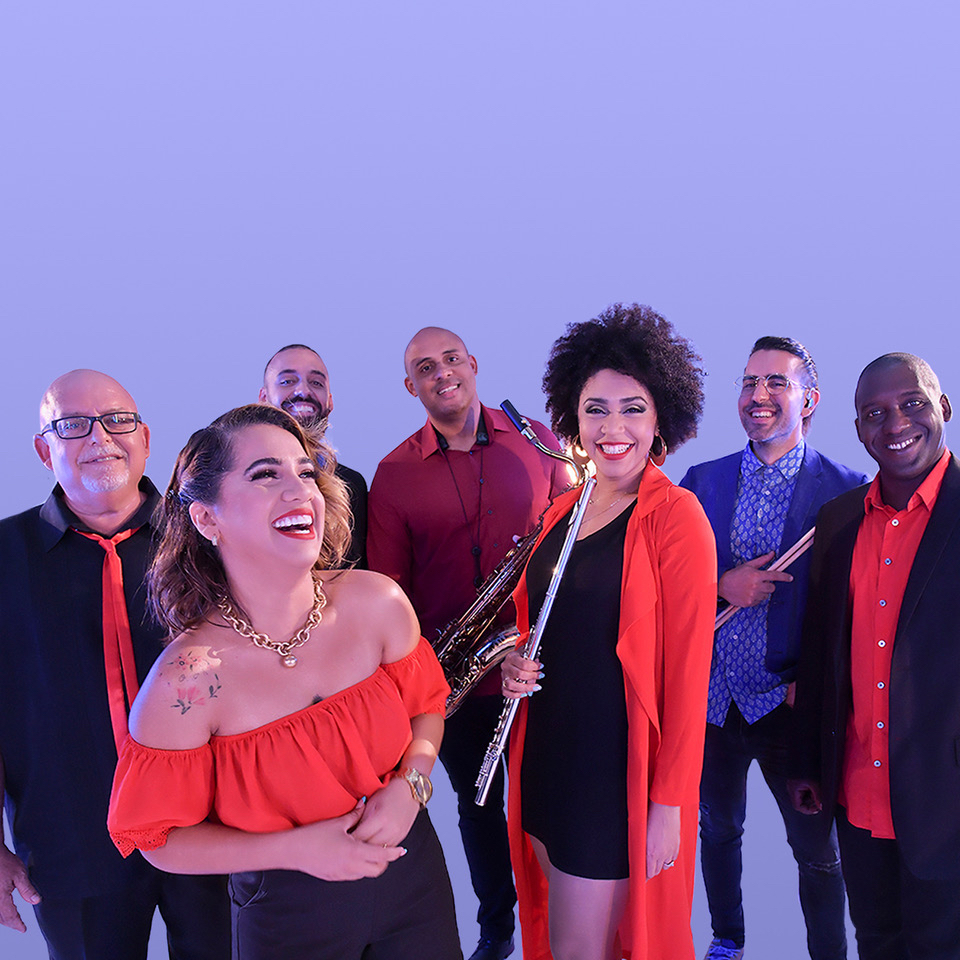

Background information
- Also known as: gopalo
- Origin: Miami, FL
- Genres: Afro-Cuban Funk, world Cuban Music, Salsa, Jazz
- Years active: 2003–present
- Label: Rolling Pin Music
- Members: Steve Roitstein; Miriam Mar; Julio Cesar Rodriguez Delet; Aldo Salvent; Dannah Santiago; Otto Santana; Dayron Gallardo
- Past members: Leslie Cartaya, Raymer Olalde, Ed Calle, Philbert Armenteros

PALO! is a Cuban Salsa and jazz group from Miami, Florida.

== Background ==
In 2003, PALO!’s leader and founder Steve Roitstein invited his fellow musicians to join him in an improvised musical experiment combining Cuban music with Latin Jazz and Funk beats. After years of successfully producing artists such as Celia Cruz, Tito Puente, Ricardo Montaner, Cheo Feliciano, Oscar d’ Leon and Willy Chirino, Roitstein decided to form his own band. “My dream behind PALO! is to share the joy of music and culture with the world.” says PALO!’s leader, producer, pianist and beatmaker.

PALO! received a nomination for a Grammy and a Latin Grammy for their album PALO! Live. The band was named Miami New Times Best Band 2012 (Readers’ Choice) and Best Latin Band 2014. PALO! is a featured act in clubs and live music venues, festivals, corporate events, and private events throughout the world.

Afro-Cuban Funk PALO! plays their own style of Cuban music they call “Afro-Cuban Funk”. Just think “funky, jazzy salsa”, or better yet, listen to some of their music.

Virtuoso Musicians PALO!’s catchy original songs have always featured extraordinary musicians. The current lineup includes the incredible vocals of charismatic Cuban singers Miriam Martinez, Dannah Santiago and Julio Cesar. The scorching percussion of Dayron Gallardo and Otto Santana punctuate the performances with Cuban fire. Latin Jazz saxophonist Aldo Salvent brings an electrifying unpredictability to every song. Bandleader Steve Roitstein fuses these elements with a foundation of edgy, unforgettable rhythms.

Some of the PALO! story was told in two award-winning PBS documentary films:

Miami Boheme (Emmy, Telly and Aurora Award winner) Ivy League Rumba (Aurora Award winner, Emmy-nominated)

Culture & Education In addition to creating and performing music, PALO! loves to do workshops, master classes, clinics, panels, and cultural seminars.

== Members ==
Recording Members

- Steve Roitstein: keyboard, beats, coros
- Miriam Mar: lead vocals, percussion
- Julio Cesar Rodriguez Delet: lead vocals, percussion
- Dannah Santiago: flute, vocals, percussion
- Aldo Salvent: sax
- Dayron Gallardo: congas
- Otto Santana: timbales

== Discography ==
- 2009: This Is Afro-Cuban Funk
- 2014: PALO! Live
- 2016: Yo Quiero Guarachar

== Singles ==
- 2018: La Habana Buena - Live
- 2019: Para Chuparse Los Dedos - Live
- 2022: Maluco
- 2022: Siempre Son Flores
- 2023: Yo Soy Del Campo

== Awards ==
Grammy Awards

Year	Nominee / work	Award	Result
2015	PALO! Live	Best Tropical Latin Album	Nominated

Latin Grammy Awards

Year	Nominee / work	Award	Result
2014	PALO! Live	Best Contemporary Tropical Album	Nominated
2013	Leslie Cartaya	Best New Artist	Nominated

Emmy Awards

Year	Nominee / work	Award	Result
2014	Miami Boheme	Documentary – Cultural (Suncoast Chapter)	Won

== See also ==
- Music of Miami
- Afro-Cuban Funk
