= Doug Beavers =

American trombonist, arranger, composer and producer

- Born: Bellflower, California, U.S.
- Genres: Jazz; Latin jazz; salsa
- Occupations: Musician, arranger, composer and producer
- Instrument: Trombone

Doug Beavers is an American Grammy Award-winning trombonist, arranger, composer and producer.

== Life and career ==
Beavers received a BA in music from California State University, East Bay, an MA in composition from the Manhattan School of Music. He is the founder of the music production company and record label, Circle 9.

Beavers has performed with artists such as Eddie Palmieri, Spanish Harlem Orchestra, Mingus Big Band, Christian McBride, Paul Simon, and others. He also served as an adjunct professor at Los Medanos College and music faculty of Jazz Trombone at California State University, East Bay. His most recent album recording,Sol, was released in 2020. In 2021, he received a New Jazz Works grant from Chamber Music America. He is currently an adjunct faculty member at the College of New Jersey.

== Selected discography ==
- Luna (2023)
- Sol (2020)
- Art of the Arrangement (2017)
- Titanes del Trombón (2015)
- Two Shades of Nude (2010)
- Conjunto Rovira 'Paraiso' (2008)
- Jazz, Baby! (2007)

== Awards and nominations ==
Year	Result	Award	Category	Work	Ref.
2018	Nominated	Grammy Awards	Best Tropical Latin Album	Art of the Arrangement	
2019	Won	Grammy Awards	Best Tropical Latin Album	Anniversary	
