= Oakland, Hub of the West =

1981 book by David Ollier

- Author: David Ollier Weber
- Illustrators: Peter Menzel, Thomas Edward Curran III
- Language: English
- Subject: Ethnology, history and geography
- Publisher: Continental Heritage Press
- Publication date: 1981
- Publication place: United States
- Media type: Print (hardback)
- Pages: 224 pp
- ISBN: 0-932986-16-1

Oakland, Hub of the West is a 1981 history book about the city of Oakland, California written by David Ollier Weber and published by Continental Heritage Press. It is now out of print. The historical photographs were edited by Thomas Edward Curran III, a museum researcher at the Oakland Museum of California. The contemporary photographs were by Peter Menzel.

== Pre-human history ==
The book begins with an explanation of the geology from the Mesozoic, Cretaceous, Cenozoic, Oligocene, Miocene, and Pleistocene epochs that created Oakland's signature geologic formations: Mount Diablo to the East, the unique redwood forests, and the San Andreas and Hayward faults that straddle the San Francisco Bay to the North. Next, the book describes the Ohlone or Huchiun Indians who populated "the eastern shores of San Francisco Bay for at least 3,500 years before the coming of the first white man." This was a territory ideal for human societies from the first Indians to today's ethnically diverse cultural and technological hub.

According to Weber, the historical record of early Indian civilization shows that Oakland was always well-suited for civilization: "Careful excavation of the two largest of over 400 Ohlone shell mounds inventoried along the perimeter of San Francisco Bay in 1908 revealed a people who early recognized the tremendous natural bounty offered them in Oakland's hills, canyons and lush salt marshes."

== 1770s to 1850 ==
Chapter two covers the period from sparse Spanish mission rule starting in 1776 in neighboring San Francisco and San Jose, through the Gold Rush, to California statehood in 1850. Chapter three covers the nascent city of Oakland and its first mayor, Horace Walpole Carpentier, then continues through the Civil War and the western transcontinental railhead: "For years, ever since the first mayor's inaugural address, Oakland's civic yearnings had focused on the state capital and the western transcontinental railhead. But when airy talk of a continent-spanning track suddenly crystallized in 1863 with organization by Governor Staford and his three partners of the Central Pacific Railroad, Oakland started lobbying hard lest dream number two also whisk through municipal fingers."

== 1870s ==
Chapter four describes Oakland's growth into a bucolic yet cultured alternative to San Francisco: "'The Athens of the Pacific' was a civic motto often repeated. The state university was the coeducational Parthenon, but scarcely inferior in esteem were the Reverend C.T. Mills' fashionable Seminary for Young Ladies, relocated to East Oakland from Benicia in 1871, and the three-story Convent of Our Lady of the Sacred Heart on the Sisters of the Holy Name (who originally opened the secondary school in 1868). On Telegraph Avenue, young men wore the cadet gray of the California Military Academy, or they attended one of a number of private secondary schools that were located near the academy. The new Oakland High School was excellent -- and, in violation of state law, it was even open to black youths. (The state constitution still excluded 'colored' pupils, along with Chinese and Indiean children, from white classrooms)."

== 1880s to 1930s ==
Chapter five covers the period from the first Oakland cable cars in 1886 to U.S. Air Secretary Charles McCracken's prediction of "real aviation passenger service" in 1927 and the purchases of land that would become the Oakland International Airport. That year or thereabouts, Louise Thaden became one of the first Oakland women to fly. It continues through the Art Deco stylings and Great Depression of the 1930s.

== City planning and subdivisions ==
Chapter six, "Busts and Booms," covers the economic vicissitudes and racial tensions that Oakland faced as the city grew.

== Post-WWII to 1980 ==
Chapter seven closes the book with a look at the post-war period until 1981, when the book was published: "World War II was a hormone shot, an artificial stimulus that produced wild new blossoms but sucked at the marrow and should ultimately debilitate," writes Weber at the launch of chapter six. Following the great migration of Southern African-American workers to Oakland's war effort, the city's demographics changed once again, from 12 percent black in 1950 to nearly double that in 1960. "Meanwhile, they were enriching the East Bay's cultural life in distinctive ways. In music, a particular raw-edged, down-home style known as the Oakland blues was evolving at backstreet night clubs like the Rumboogie, the Three Sisters, Slim Jenkins, the Manhattan and Esther's Orbit Room."

== Notable Oaklanders ==
Among the famous figures mentioned in the book are the following:

- Junípero Serra, founder of Alta California's earliest Spanish missions
- Joaquin Miller, poet and frontiersman
- Jack London, writer
- Samuel Merritt, mayor of Oakland
- Isadora Duncan, dancer
- Gertrude Stein, writer
- John Handy, jazz saxophonist
- Pharoah Sanders, jazz saxophonist
- Sonny Simmons, jazz saxophonist
- Earl "Fatha" Hines, jazz pianist buried at Evergreen Cemetery in Oakland
- The Pointer Sisters, R&B singing group
- The Whispers, gospel singing group
- Lionel Wilson, first African-American mayor, serving three terms from 1977 to 1991
- Jim Hines, African-American sprinter from McClymonds High School who won (and accepted) two gold medals in the 1968 Mexico City Olympics at the height of the Black Power movement

== Corporate histories ==
Sponsored by the Oakland Chamber of Commerce, the book was also supported by 43 corporate sponsors, each of whom had a brief corporate history published within the book starting on page 175. These were a cross-section of the types of businesses that built Oakland into a West Coast transportation and commerce hub: American President Lines, the Port of Oakland, The Grotto, Emporium Capwell, The Clorox Company, Children's Hospital Medical Center, Chevron, California College of Arts and Crafts, Trader Vic's, Peerless Coffee, The Oakland Tribune, The Oakland Symphony, and The Oakland-Alameda County Coliseum Complex, among others. Two railroad sponsors were profiled, Southern Pacific Company and Western Pacific Railroad; the latter was acquired in 1983, just two years after the book's publication, by Union Pacific Railroad.

== Reviews and citations ==
"...according to historian David Weber in his book Oakland, Hub of the West, [Oakland] Mayor [Horace] Carpentier had arranged that everyone had to pay him tribute to enter or leave Oakland. Needless to say, he became the most hated man in Oakland and was chased out of town on at least two occasions by gathering mobs who also stoned his house."
