= Aymée Nuviola =

Cuban-born Grammy-winning singer, composer, and actress (b. 1973)

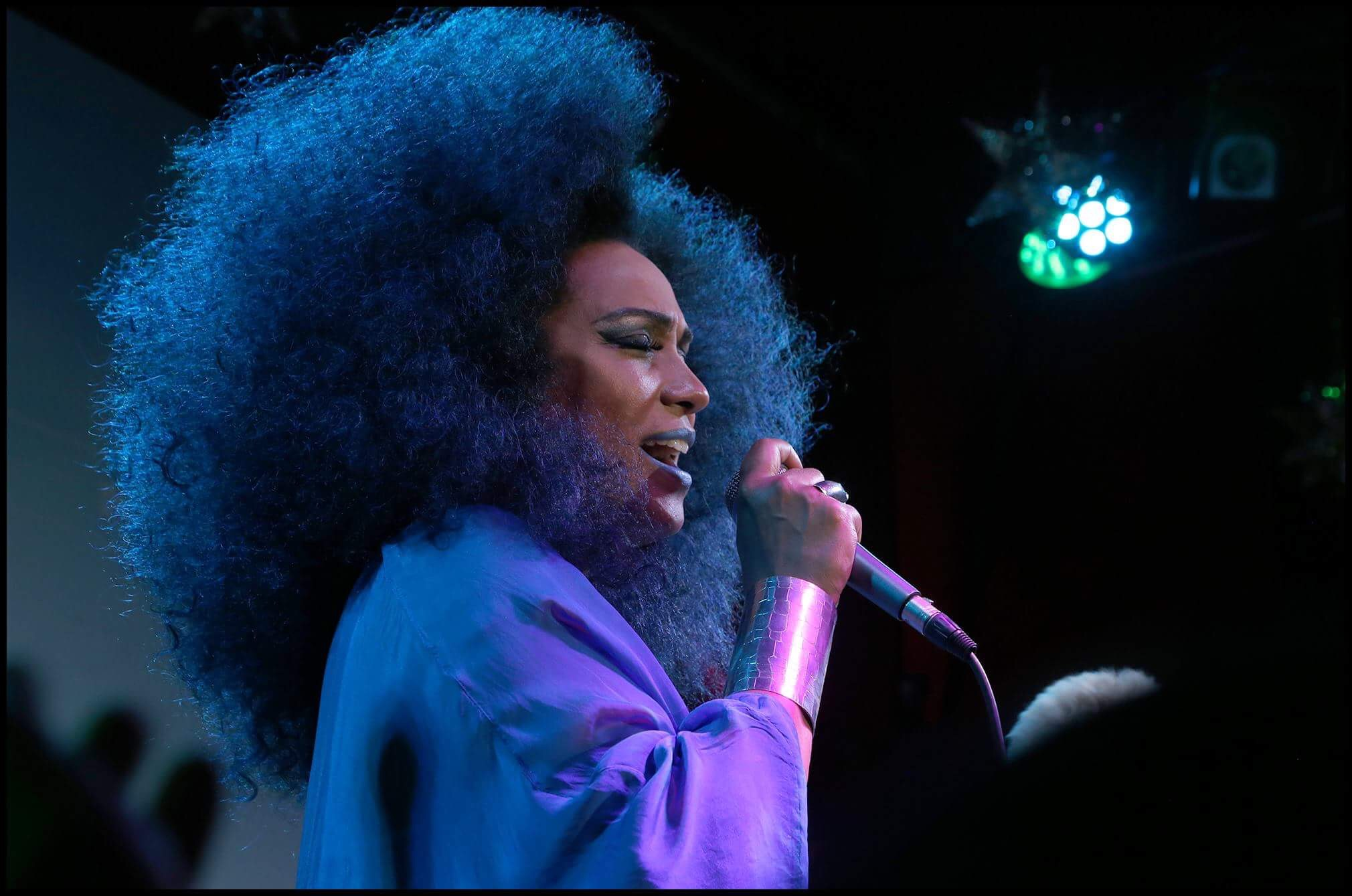

Background information
- Also known as: La sonera del mundo
- Born: Aymée Regla Nuviola Suárez; January 8, 1973 (age 53); Havana, Cuba
- Genres: Timba, Jazz, Son, Salsa, Filin, Bossa Nova
- Occupation: Singer / Composer / Actress
- Label: Top Stop Music/Sony Latin
- Website: aymeenuviola.com

Aymée Regla Nuviola Suárez (born January 8, 1973 in Havana, Cuba) is a Cuban singer, pianist, composer and actress, nicknamed "La Sonera del Mundo". She is also known for having played Celia Cruz in the Colombian telenovela Celia.

She won a Grammy Award for Best Tropical Latin Album with A Journey Through Cuban Music in the 62nd Annual Grammy Awards in 2020. «Como anillo al dedo», Aymée Nuviola, winner of the Latin Grammy 2018 as the best tropical fusion album and nominated for Cubadisco 2018 in the category of dance music voices, in 2014 nominated for the Latin Grammy and Grammy G 2015 with the album «First Class to Havana» as best Salsa album and best Tropical album..

She has also collaborated on multiple Grammy winning albums, the last of which was «No quiero Llanto» del Septeto Santiaguero in 2016. She was nominated for the Billboards Awards in 2010, the result of her first production in the United States"Corazón Sonero", by three consecutive years, 2014, 2015, 2016 was nominated for the Cubadisco (Cuba) contest, as best singer-songwriter and best popular music album with the productions «En la intimidad», «First Class to Havana» and «El regreso a La Habana» the latter produced by Sergio George.

In 2014, Aymée was selected among the 25 most influential figures in Miami by the newspaper New Times, at the end of 2016, she reached # 1 on the Billboard Tropical list with the theme «Bailando todo se olvida» and she is the first Afro-Latina in the history of Spotify, in representing with her image and her music the Black History Month, of the year 2017 (annual celebration in the United States) through the playlist with the name, "Viva Afro-Latino".

== Biography ==
Aymee was born in the neighborhood of San Leopoldo in Havana, Cuba. Her mother, Adelaida Elisa Suárez Hernández was professor of history and head of tourism at the school of the Sevilla Hotel in Havana, collaterally, gave piano lessons at home and composed songs for children. Her father, Nelson Vicente Nuviola Bofill, is an industrial engineer and amateur singer. Aymée Nuviola shared her childhood with her three siblings, Lourdes, Alexander and Nelson and with her cousins Renón, José Ángel and Mercita.

Born into a family of musicians, she began playing piano at the age of 3 years, later she graduated from the Manuel Saumell Conservatory in Havana. As a child Aymée composed and sang along with the piano and inspired by the work of Benny Moré, Elena Burke, Omara Portuondo, José Antonio Méndez and others. With these influences, she became the voice in several recordings of groups like "Irakere" and "NG La Banda". Later, she and her sister Lourdes were the singers of the Cuban music group "Pachito Alonso y sus Kini Kinis".

With 9 years of age she began to sing professionally with her sister Lourdes, forming the duo "Las hermanas Nuviola", name with which both became known in their native Cuba, where they won the "Todo el mundo canta" contest.

The music of Aymée is a fusion between genres such as Jazz, Timba, Son, Guaguancó, Guaracha and Charanga, all of them decorated with urban electronic colors. Aymée also ventures into genres such as: the Bolero, the Filin, Bossa nova and the romantic song. However, it was with the salsa and the fierce Timba, (genre in which is one of its founders.) As it became known internationally.

Aymée has participated in jazz festivals such as the North Sea Jazz Festival and Curaçao and has performed practically in the five continents, from her native island Cuba to Mexico, Chile, Colombia, Argentina, Uruguay, Panama, Brazil, Spain, Italy, France, the Netherlands, Hungary, and in several places in the United States, including the emblematic Madison Square Garden, The Dolby Theatre in Hollywood and the Adrienne Arsht Center for the Performing Arts in Miami among others.

In 2015, she was invited to participate in the most important audiovisual event in Puerto Rico, "The Banco Popular Christmas Special." In 2016, she was given the key to the city of Miami and Mayor Tomas Regalado proclaimed February 10 as the day of Aymée Nuviola in the city of Miami, a distinction repeated by the mayor of the city of Houston, Sylvester Turner proclaiming October 14, 2016 as the day of Aymée Nuviola in that city.

In January 2026, she was the feature guest in Sesiones Desde La Loma EP. 60

== Private life ==
In 2010, Aymée met Paulo Simeón, a producer and director of television and radio (later her universal manager) with whom she had a one-year engagement before getting married.

In 1998, Aymée, although raised and educated as a Catholic, converted to Protestantism.

== Philanthropy ==
Aymée, has been cooperating for more than 12 years with the "League Against Cancer" in the city of Miami, also with the organization "Walk Now for Autism Speaks" and with several aid organizations in Colombia, Venezuela and Puerto Rico, for the latter, was part of the collection and distribution of a private plane provided by Gregory Elias and Top Stop Music, with more than three tons of food for the victims of Hurricane Maria on the island, as well as he wrote and later recorded along with the singer Rey Ruiz, the song: "Pa'lante Puerto Rico", which donated all the rights of authorship and distribution to raise funds for the victims of said hurricane.

== Discography ==
=== Albums ===
- Como anillo al dedo (2017)
1. «Pa’ que la gente se entere»
2. «Soy yo quien te enseñó»
3. «Lo que tú me pidas»
4. «Rumba de la buena»
5. «Donde está el billete»
6. «Dame un like»
7. «Como anillo al dedo»
8. «Quedamos en paz»
9. «Quiero enamorarme»
10. «Bailando todo se olvida»
- El Regreso a La Habana (2016)
1. «La vida es un carnaval»
2. «La negra tiene tumbao»
3. «Te busco»
4. «Toro mata»
5. «Yerbero moderno»
6. «Quimbara»
7. «Burundanga»
8. «Vieja luna»
9. «Bemba colora»
10. «Cúcala»
11. «Mi so den boso»
- First class to Habana (2014)
1. «Paco»
2. «Tú sí vives contento»
3. «El espacio»
4. «De La Habana hasta aquí»
5. «Foto de familia»
6. «Yo te quiero un montón»
7. «El ratón»
8. «Un amor genial»
9. «Brindemos»
10. «Yo soy así»
11. «La Habana y tú»
- En La Intimidad (2013)
1. «Si me vas a amar»
2. «Gracias por el consuelo»
3. «Me equivoqué»
4. «Tú no te das cuenta»
5. «Contigo»
6. «Confía en mí»
7. «Nada quedó»
8. «Nada es para ti»
9. «Ya no creo en ti»
10. «Quédate»
11. «Sin ver el final»
12. «Fiesta»
13. «La niña que yo más quiero»
- Corazón Sonero (2008)
1. «Salsa con timba»
2. «Amor de película»
3. «Un poco de salsa»
4. «Nada quedó»
5. «Mejor tarde que nada»
6. «Algo más que amigos»
7. «Para no verte más»
8. «Bandido»
9. «Yo sé que es mentira»
10. «En guayabero»

=== Singles ===
- 2017: «Rumba de la buena»
- 2016: «Bailando todo se olvida» Feat. Baby Rasta & Gringo
- 2016: «La negra tiene tumbao» Feat. Kat Dahlia
- 2014: «El espacio»
- 2013: «Fiesta»
- 2013: «Ya no creo en ti»
- 2008: «Salsa con timba»

=== Collaborative ===
- Pa’ lante Puerto Rico (Feat. Rey Ruiz)
- Sunny (Feat. Negroni's Trío)
- Bailando todo se olvida (Feat. Baby Rasta & Gringo)
- Si no hay capitán (Feat. Gerley, Andy Montañez, José Alberto "El Canario")
- La negra tiene tumbao (Feat. Kat Dahlia)
- Pa’ chuparse los dedos (Feat. Palo)
- Cachita (Feat. Charlie Aponte)
- De La Habana hasta aquí (Feat. Gonzalo Rubalcaba)
- La Habana y tu (Feat. Alexis Valdés)
- Tu si vives contento (Feat. El Mola)
- Foto de familia (Feat. Ed Calle)
- Sin ver el final (Feat. Rafael Brito ))
- Algo más que amigos (Feat. Rey Ruiz)
- Metiste la pata (Feat. Septeto Santiguero)
- Me sabe a Azucar (Feat Andy Montañez)
- Di Mi Nombre (Feat. Alfredo Triff)
- Palabra (Feat. Alfredo Triff)
- Convergencia (Feat. Alfredo Triff)
- Pa’lla (Feat. El Mola)

=== record label ===
- Top Stop Music
- Sony Music Latin
- Valorty Records
- Select-O-Hits
- Worldwide Entertainment

== Filmography ==
=== TV soaps ===
Año	TV soaps	character
2015-2016	Celia	Úrsula Hilaria Celia Caridad Cruz Alfonso / Celia Cruz Adulta

=== Documentaries ===
Domumentary	Producer	Place	Director
El Regreso a La Habana	Gegory Elías/ Paulo Simeón	Cuba	Paulo Simeón

=== Videography ===
Song	Producer	Place	Director
Rumba de la buena	Paola Fallas	Miami	Paola Fallas
Bailando todo se olvida	Julio E. Pérez/Paulo Simeón	Cuba	Paulo Simeón
La negra tiene tumbao	Paolo Croce	Miami	Paolo Croce
El espacio	Sebastian Sorin	Argentina	Sebastián Sorin
Te quiero un montón	Julio E. Pérez	Miami	Paulo Simeón
Sin ver el final	Edwin Gonzáles /Paulo Simeón	Miami	Paulo Simeón
Me equivoqué	Justo Piñero	Miami	Paulo Simeón
Quédate	Justo Piñero	Miami	Paulo Simeón
Gracias por el consuelo	Justo Piñero	Miami	Paulo Simeón
Fiesta	Justo Piñero	Miami	Paulo Simeón
Ya no creo en ti	Justo Piñero	Miami	Paulo Simeón

== Awards and nominations ==
Year	Awards	Álbum	Category	Result
2010	Billboard Latino	Corazón sonero	Artista tropical airplay del año, femenino	Nominated
2014	Latin Grammy	First class to Havana	Mejor álbum de salsa	Nominated
2014	Cubadisco	En la intimidad	Mejor cantautora	Nominated
2015	Grammy Award	First class to Havana	Best Tropical Latin Album	Nominated
2015	Cubadisco	First class to Havana	Mejor álbum de música tropical	Nominated
2016	Cubadisco	El Regreso a La Habana	Mejor álbum de música tropical	Nominated
2018	Latin Grammy	Como anillo al dedo	Mejor álbum fusión tropical	Winner
2018	Cubadisco	Como anillo al dedo	Voces de música bailable	Nominated
2020	Grammy Award	A Journey Through Cuban Music	Best Tropical Latin Album	Winner

== Important scenarios ==
- Teatro de Verano, Montevideo (21/10/17) Gilberto Santa Rosa
- "North Sea Jazz Festival", Holanda (14/07/2017)
- Teatro Leal, La Laguna (16/06/2017)
- "A lo Grande" Sinfónico, Santo Domingo (10/05/2017) Rey Ruiz
- "Cuatro pianos para Meme", Teatro Manuel Artime, Miami (23/05/2017) Meme Solis
- "Hollywood Salsa Festival", Miami (8/05/2017)
- "De Cuba Soy", Santiago de Chile (16/11/2016)
- "Latin AMAs" (06/10/2016) Baby Rasta & Gringo
- " Curacao North Sea Jazz festival" (02/06/2016) Charlie Aponte*
- "Día Nacional de la Salsa", Puerto Rico (2016) Charlie Aponte*
- "Feria de Cali", Cali (26/12/2015)
- "Tributo a Celia", Adrienne Arsht Center Miami (19/9/15) Diego El Cigala
- "Latin AMAs" (09/10/2015)
- "Salsa Gigants" (2014) Sergio George
