= Grammy Award for Best Tropical Latin Album =

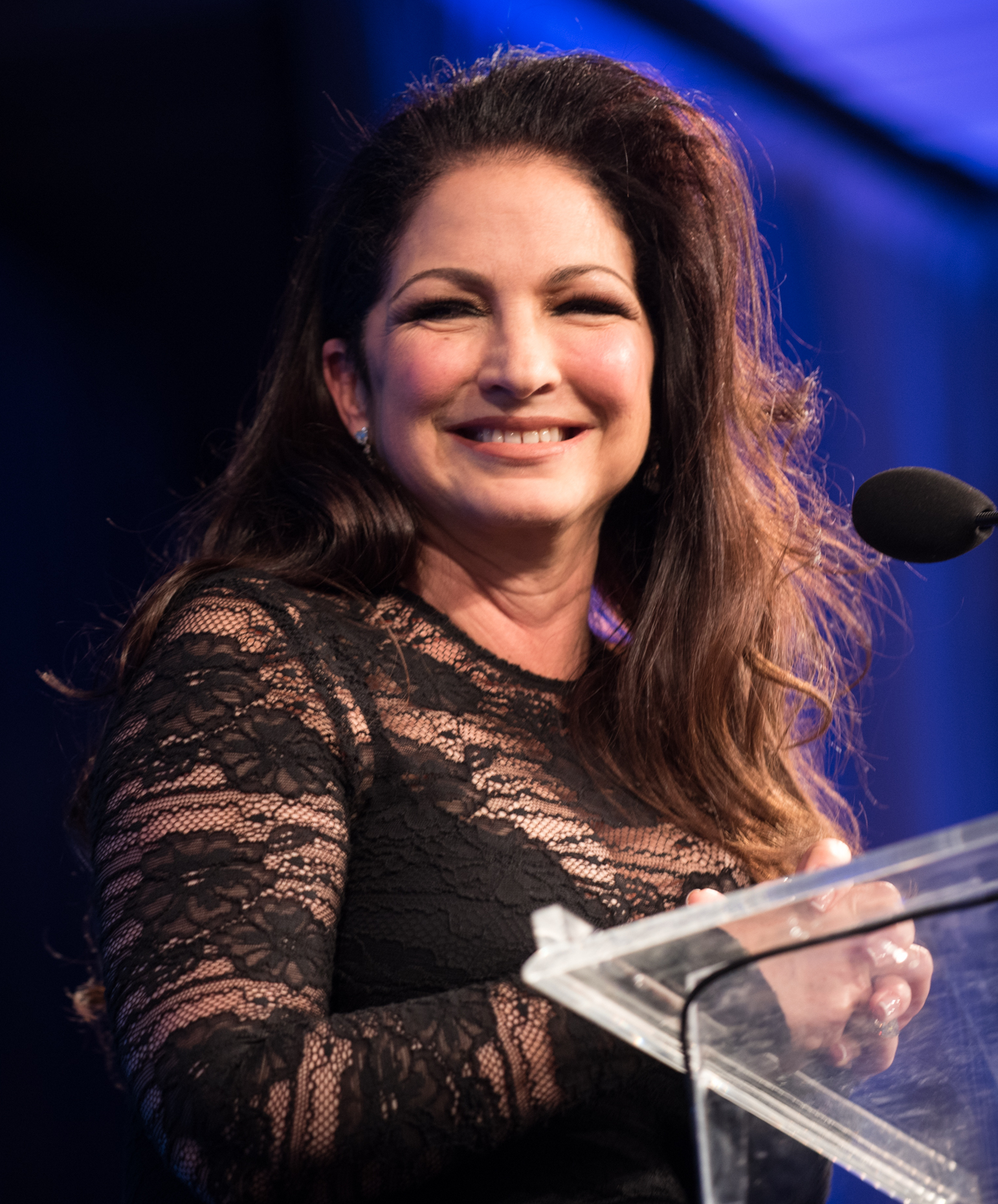
- Raíces by Gloria Estefan is the most recent recipient
- Awarded for: quality vocal or instrumental tropical latin albums
- Country: United States
- Presented by: National Academy of Recording Arts and Sciences
- First award: 1984
- Currently held by: Gloria Estefan – Raíces (2026)
- Website: grammy.com

The Grammy Award for Best Tropical Latin Album is an award presented at the Grammy Awards, a ceremony that was established in 1958 and originally called the Gramophone Awards, to recording artists for releasing albums in the tropical latin music genres. Honors in several categories are presented at the ceremony annually by the National Academy of Recording Arts and Sciences of the United States to "honor artistic achievement, technical proficiency and overall excellence in the recording industry, without regard to album sales or chart position".

According to the 54th Grammy Awards description guide the award is intended "for albums containing at least 51% playing time of new vocal or instrumental tropical Latin recordings". This category includes all forms of traditional tropical music, salsa and merengue.

This award has been handed out since 1984 and has had several name changes:

- From 1984 to 1991, and then again from 1995 to 1999 the award was known as Best Tropical Latin Performance
- From 1992 to 1994, it was awarded as Best Tropical Latin Album
- In 2000, it was awarded as Best Traditional Tropical Latin Performance
- From 2001 to 2010, it was awarded as Best Traditional Tropical Latin Album. From 2000 to 2003 two separate awards, the Best Salsa Album and Best Merengue Album, existed for salsa and merengue recordings respectively. Then from 2004 to 2006 the award for Best Salsa/Merengue Album existed.
- In 2011, the name Best Tropical Latin Album returned.

Tito Puente was the first artist to win the category. Rubén Blades has the most wins with seven awards, four of which he shares with Roberto Delgado & Orquesta. Gloria Estefan is the most-awarded female artist with 4 accolades. Blades is the most-nominated artist with 14 nominations, while Celia Cruz is the most-nominated female artist with 9 nominations. Willie Colón has received the most nominations without a win, with eight.

== Winners and nominees ==
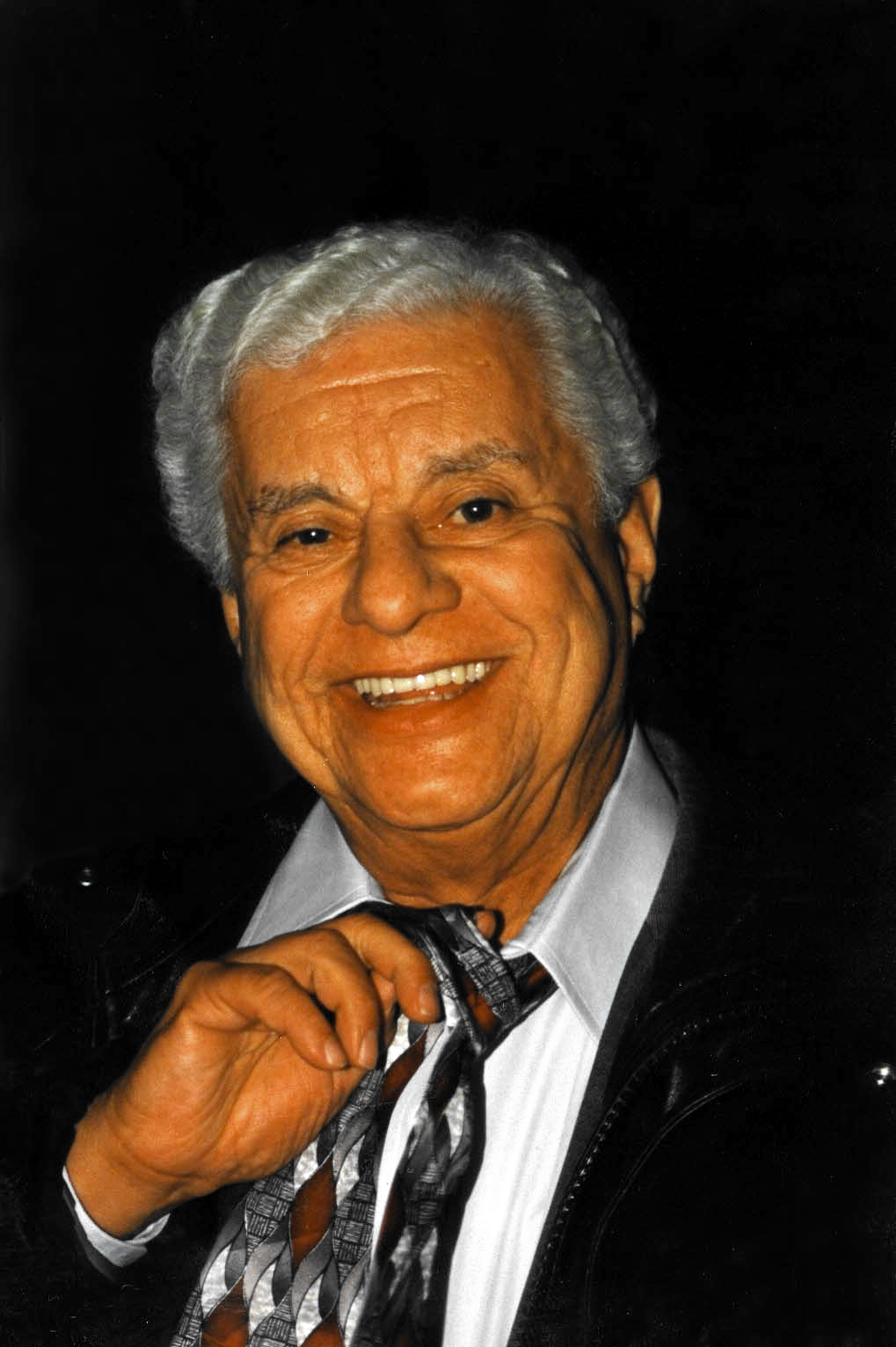
Three-time winner Tito Puente was the first winner of the award

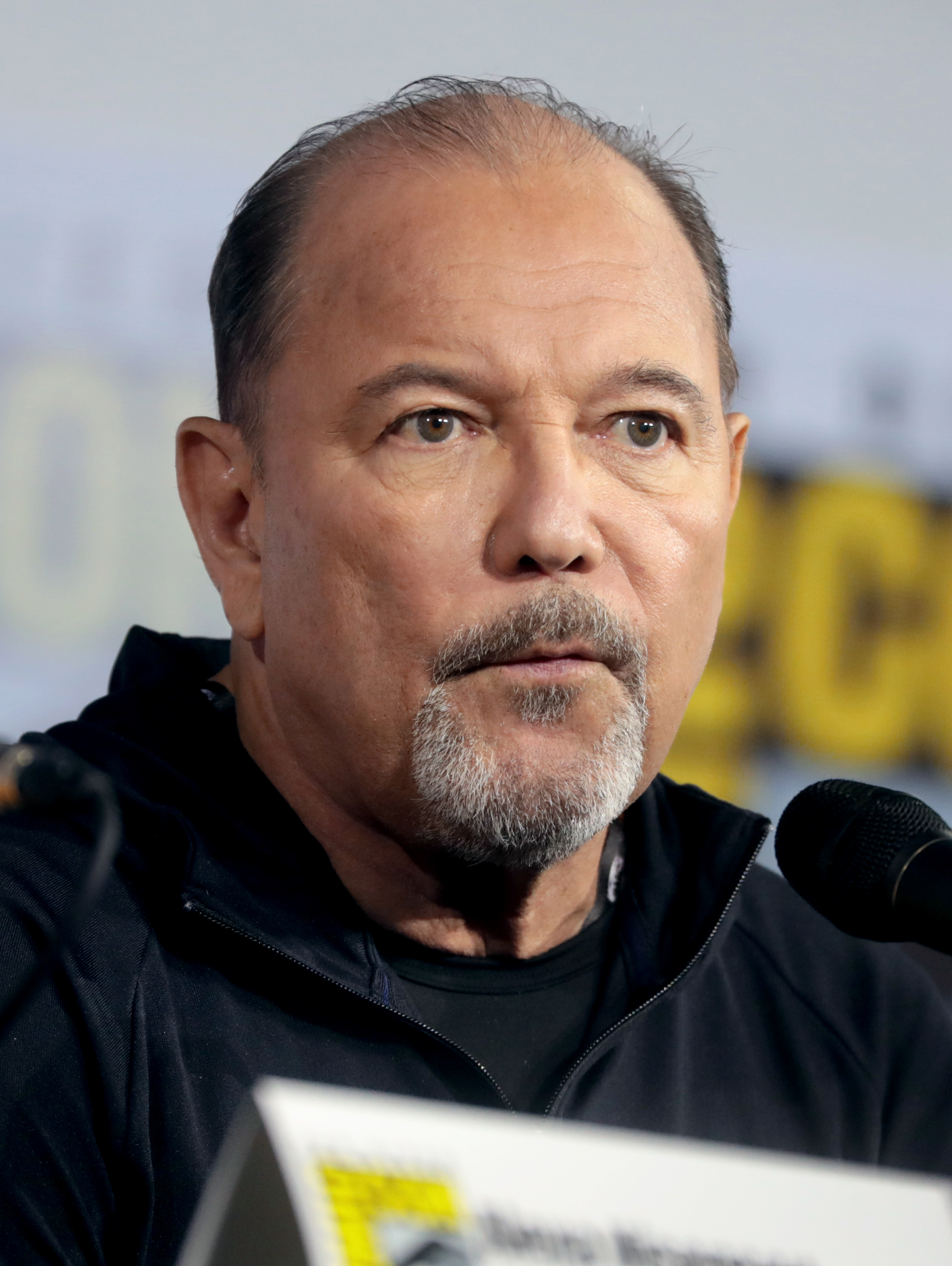
Ruben Blades has the most wins with five and most nominations with fourteen

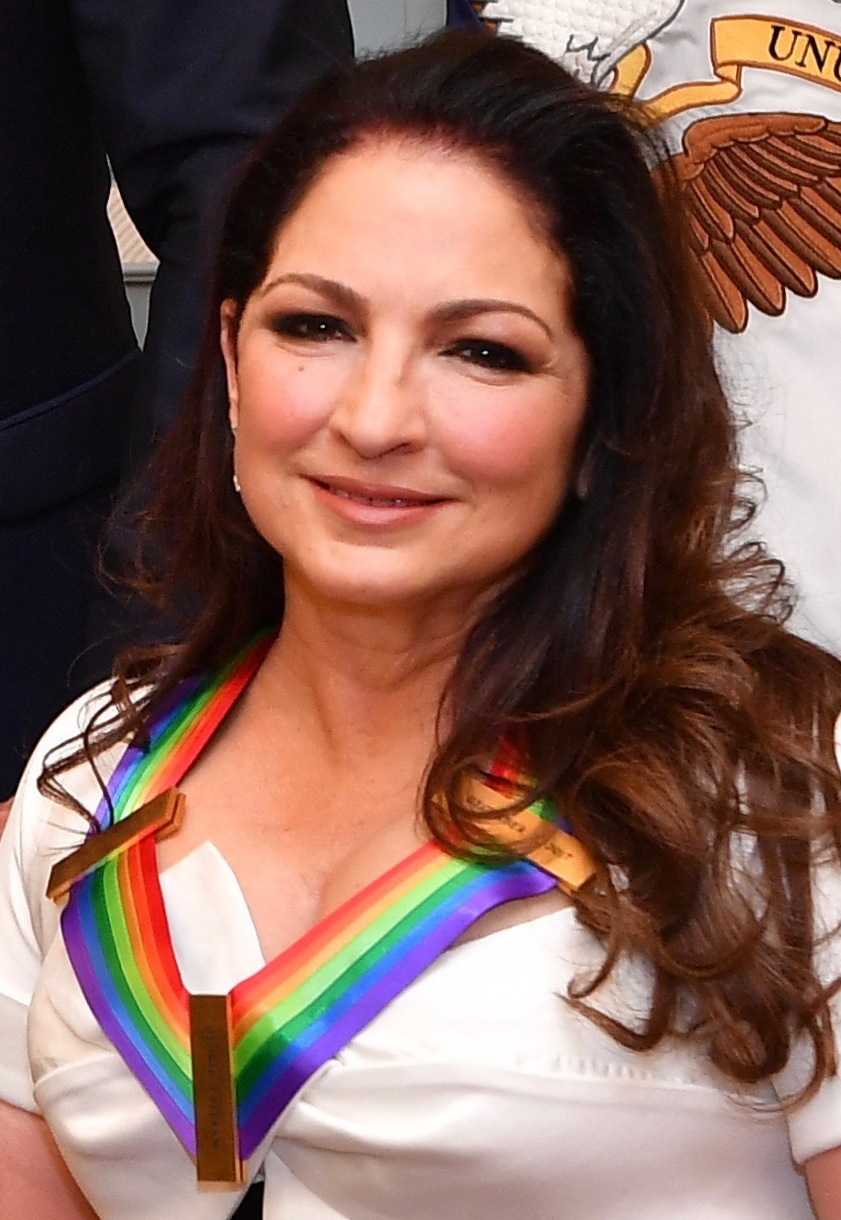
Four-time winner Gloria Estefan is the most-awarded female artist

Year^{[I]}	Performing artist(s)	Work	Nominees	Ref.
1984	Tito Puente and his Latin Ensemble	On Broadway	Corazón Guerrero – Willie Colón; El Que la Hace la Paga – Rubén Blades; Mongo Magic – Mongo Santamaría; Tremendo Trío – Ray Barretto, Celia Cruz and Adalberto Santiago	
1985	Eddie Palmieri	Palo Pa' Rumba	Bien Sabroso! – Poncho Sánchez; In Alaska: Breaking the Ice – El Gran Combo de Puerto Rico; Buscando América – Rubén Blades; Criollo – Willie Colón; Y Ahora! – Los Socios del Ritmo	
1986	Eddie Palmieri	Solito	Noche de Discothèque – Bonny Cepeda and Orchestra; De Nuevo – Celia Cruz and Johnny Pacheco; Free Spirit – Espiritu Libre – Mongo Santamaría and his Latin Jazz Orchestra; Mucho Mejor – Rubén Blades	
1987	Rubén Blades and Seis del Solar	Escenas	Afro-Cuban Jazz – Mario Bauza; Especial No. 5 – Willie Colón; Homenaje a Beny Moré, Vol. 3 – Celia Cruz and Tito Puente; Nueva Cosecha – Willie Rosario	
1988	Eddie Palmieri	La Verdad – The Truth	Agua de Luna (Moon Water) – Rubén Blades; Aquí se Puede – Ray Barretto; Caribbean Express – Caribbean Express; Strikes Back – Héctor Lavoe; The Winners – Celia Cruz and Willie Colón	
1989	Rubén Blades and Son del Solar	Antecedente	La Salsa Soy Yo – Oscar D'León; Mister E. – Pete Escovedo; Salsobita – Johnny Pacheco and Pete "El Conde" Rodríguez; Sigo Atrevido – Eddie Santiago	
1990	Celia Cruz and Ray Barretto	Ritmo en el Corazón	Animation – Wilfrido Vargas; "Azúcar" – Eddie Palmieri; Irresistible – Ray Barretto; Top Secrets/Altos Secretos – Willie Colón	
1991	Tito Puente	"Lambada Timbales"	"Amiga" – Luis Enrique; Color Americano – Willie Colón; "Mama Guela" – Poncho Sánchez; Tito Puente presents Millie P. – Tito Puente and Millie P.	
1992	Juan Luis Guerra	Bachata Rosa	Caminando – Rubén Blades; Luces del Alma – Luis Enrique; A Night at Kimball's East – Poncho Sánchez; The Mambo King 100th LP – Tito Puente	
1993	Linda Ronstadt	Frenesí	Soy Dichoso – Ray Barretto; Amor y Control – Rubén Blades; Tributo a Ismael Rivera – Celia Cruz; Gracias – El Gran Combo de Puerto Rico	
1994	Gloria Estefan	Mi Tierra	Willie Colón – Hecho en Puerto Rico; Celia Cruz – Azúcar Negra; El Gran Combo de Puerto Rico – First Class International; Juan Luis Guerra – Areíto; Luis Enrique – Dilema	
1995	Israel López "Cachao"	Master Sessions Vol. 1	Fogaraté! – Juan Luis Guerra; Luis Enrique – Luis Enrique; La Aventura – Orquesta de la Luz; Cara de Niño – Jerry Rivera	
1996	Gloria Estefan	Abriendo Puertas	Tras la Tomenta – Willie Colón and Rubén Blades; Irrepetible – Celia Cruz; Master Sessions, Vol. 2 – Israel López "Cachao"; Todo a su Tiempo – Marc Anthony	
1997	Rubén Blades	La Rosa de los Vientos	Dicen Que... – Albita; DLG – Dark Latin Groove; El Sonero del Mundo – Oscar D'León; Fresco – Jerry Rivera; Tony Vega – Tony Vega	
1998	Ry Cooder	Buena Vista Social Club	Una Mujer Como Yo – Albita; A Toda Cuba le Gusta – Afro-Cuban All Stars; Sobre el Fuego – La India; Llévame Contigo – Olga Tañón	
1999	Marc Anthony	Contra la Corriente	Mi Vida es Cantar – Celia Cruz; Suavemente – Elvis Crespo; El Rumbero del Piano – Eddie Palmieri; Live at Birdland – Dancemania '99 – Tito Puente; Babalú Ayé – Chucho Valdés and Irakere	
2000	Tito Puente	Mambo Birdland	Late Night Sessions – Caravana Cubana; Buena Vista Social Club Presents Ibrahim Ferrer – Ibrahim Ferrer; Songs from a Little Blue House – Juan Carlos Formell; Sublime Ilusión – Eliades Ochoa; El Amor de Mi Tierra – Carlos Vives	
2001	Gloria Estefan	Alma Caribeña	Rhythms for a New Millenium – Alex Acuña y su Acuarela de Tambores; Cuba Linda – Israel López "Cachao"; Tribute to the Cuarteto Patria – Eliades Ochoa; Buena Vista Social Club Presents: Omara Portuondo – Omara Portuondo	
2002	Carlos Vives	Déjame Entrar	Las Flores de la Vida – Compay Segundo; Chanchullo – Rubén González; Canto – Los Super Seven; La Charanga Eterna – Orquesta Aragón	
2003	Bebo Valdés with Israel López "Cachao" and Carlos "Patato" Valdes	El Arte del Sabor	Generoso Qué Bueno Toca Usted – Grand Afro Cuban Orchestra of Generoso Jiménez; En Route – Orquesta Aragón; Mi Ritmo – Plena Libre; Cuban Masters: Los Originales – various artists	
2004	Ibrahim Ferrer	Buenos Hermanos	Poetas del Son – Septeto Nacional Ignacio Pineiro; Pasado y Presente – Soneros de Verdad presents Rubalcaba; Barbarito Torres – Barbarito Torres; Bajando Gervasio – Amadito Valdés	
2005	Israel López "Cachao"	Ahora Si!	Angel Meléndez and the 911 Mambo Orchestra – Angel Meléndez and the 911 Mambo Orchestra; Inólvidable – Cándido & Graciela; Flor de Amor – Omara Portuondo; Recuerda a Beny Moré – Tropicana All Stars	
2006	Bebo Valdés	Bebo de Cuba	Una Noche Inolvidable – Afro-Latin Jazz Orchestra with Arturo O'Farrill; Masters of Cuban Son – Conjunto Progreso; Buena Vista Social Club Presents – Manuel "Guajiro" Mirabal; Tradición – Tropicana All Stars and Israel Kantor	
2007	Gilberto Santa Rosa	Directo al Corazón	Fuzionando – Oscar D'León; Salsatón: Salsa con Reggaeton – Andy Montañez; Hoy, Mañana y Siempre – Tito Nieves; What You've Been Waiting For – Lo Que Esperabas – Tiempo Libre	
2008	Juan Luis Guerra	La Llave de Mi Corazón	Greetings from Havana – ¡Cubanisimo!; En Primera Plana – Issac Delgado; Arroz con Habichuela – El Gran Combo de Puerto Rico; United We Swing – Spanish Harlem Orchestra	
2009	José Feliciano	Señor Bachata	Cuba: Un Viaje Musical – A Musical Journey – Albita, Donato Poveda and Rey Ruiz; Renacer – Dark Latin Groove; Frutero Moderno – Gonzalo Grau y la Clave Secreta; Back on the Streets... Taste of Spanish Harlem Vol. 2 – New Swing Sextet	
2010	Luis Enrique	Ciclos	Así Soy – Isaac Delgado; Guásabara – José Lugo Orchestra; Gracias – Omara Portuondo; Bach in Havana – Tiempo Libre	
2011	Spanish Harlem Orchestra	Viva La Tradición	El Gran Combo de Puerto Rico – Sin Salsa No Hay Paraíso; Juan Luis Guerra 440 – A Son de Guerra; Gilberto Santa Rosa – Irrepetible; Various artists – 100 Sones Cubanos	
2012	Israel López "Cachao"	The Last Mambo	Edwin Bonilla – Homenaje A Los Rumberos; José Rizo's Mongorama – Monograma	
2013	Marlow Rosado and La Riqueña	Retro	Raúl Lara y sus Soneros – Cubano Soy; Eddie Montalvo – Desde Nueva York a Puerto Rico; Romeo Santos – Formula, Vol. 1	
2014	Pacific Mambo Orchestra	Pacific Mambo Orchestra	Marc Anthony – 3.0; Los Angeles Azules – Como te Voy a Olvidar; Various artists – Sergio George Presents Salsa Giants; Carlos Vives –Corazón Profundo	
2015	Carlos Vives	Más Corazón Profundo	El Gran Combo de Puerto Rico – 50 Anniversario; Aymeé Nuviola – First Class to Havana; PALO! – Live; Totó La Momposina – El Asunto	
2016	Rubén Blades with Roberto Delgado & Orquesta	Son de Panamá	José Alberto "El Canario" & Septeto Santiaguero – Tributo a Los Compadres: No Quiero Llanto; Guaco – Presente Continuo; Juan Luis Guerra and 4.40 – Todo Tiene Su Hora; Victor Manuelle – Que Suenen los Tambores	
2017	Jose Lugo & Guasábara Combo	Donde Están?	Fonseca - Conexión; Juan Formell & Los Van Van – La Fantasia Homenaje a Juan Formell; Grupo Niche – 35 Aniversario; La Sonora Santanera – La Sonora Santanera En Su 60 Aniversario	
2018	Rubén Blades con Roberto Delgado & Orquesta	Salsa Big Band	Albita – Albita; Doug Beavers – Art of the Arrangement; Silvestre Dangond – Gente Valiente; Diego El Cigala – Indestructible	
2019	Spanish Harlem Orchestra	Anniversary	Charlie Aponte - Pa' Mi Gente; Formell Y Los Van Van - Legado; Orquesta Akokán - Orquesta Akokán; Felipe Peláez - Ponle Actitud	
2020	Aymée Nuviola	A Journey Through Cuban Music	Luis Enrique & C4 Trio - Tiempo al Tiempo; Vicente Garcia - Candela; Juan Luis Guerra & 4.40 - Literal	
2020	Marc Anthony	Opus	Luis Enrique & C4 Trio - Tiempo al Tiempo; Vicente Garcia - Candela; Juan Luis Guerra & 4.40 - Literal	
2021	Grupo Niche	40	José Alberto "El Ruiseñor" - Mi Tumbao; Edwin Bonilla - Infinito; Jorge Celedon & Sergio Luis - Sigo Cantando al Amor (Deluxe); Víctor Manuelle - Memorias de Navidad	
2022	Rubén Blades & Roberto Delgado & Orquesta	SALSWING!	El Gran Combo de Puerto Rico - En Cuarantena; Aymée Nuviola - Sin Salsa No Hay Paraíso; Gilberto Santa Rosa - Colegas; Tony Succar - Live in Peru	
2023	Marc Anthony	Pa'lla Voy	La Santa Cecilia - Quiero Verte Feliz; Victor Manuelle - Lado A Lado B; Tito Nieves - Legendario; Spanish Harlem Orchestra - Imágenes Latinas; Carlos Vives - Cumbiana II	
2024	Rubén Blades con Roberto Delgado & Orquesta	Siembra: 45º Aniversario (En Vivo en el Coliseo de Puerto Rico, 14 de Mayo 2022)	Grupo Niche & Orquesta Sinfónica Nacional de Colombia - Niche Sinfónica; Omara Portuondo - Vida; Luis Figueroa - Voy A Ti; Tony Succar & Mimy Succar - Mimy & Tony; Carlos Vives - Escalona Nunca Se Habia Grabado Así	
2025	Tony Succar & Mimy Succar	Alma, Corazón y Salsa (Live at Gran Teatro Nacional)	Marc Anthony - Muevense; Sheila E. - Bailar; Juan Luis Guerra - Radio Güira; Kiki Valera - Vacilón Santiaguero	
2026	Gloria Estefan	Raíces	Rubén Blades & Roberto Delgado & Orquesta - Fotografías; Grupo Niche - Clásicos 1; Alain Pérez - Bingo; Gilberto Santa Rosa - Debut y Segunda Tanda, Vol. 2	
2027	Winner TBA on 7 February 2027		Rubén Blades & Roberto Delgado & Orquesta - País Portatil; Luis Enrique - El Alma en Cave; Fonseca - Antes Que El Tiempo Se Vaya; Grupo Niche - Más Que Palabres; Carlos Vives - El (Ultimo Disco Vol. 1)	

- ^{^[I]} Each year is linked to the article about the Grammy Awards held that year.

== Multiple Winners ==
7 wins

- Rubén Blades

4 wins

- Cachao
- Gloria Estefan
- Roberto Delgado & Orquesta

3 wins

- Eddie Palmieri
- Marc Anthony
- Tito Puente

2 wins

- Bebo Valdés
- Carlos Vives
- Juan Luis Guerra
- Spanish Harlem Orchestra

== Multiple nominees ==
14 nominations

- Rubén Blades

9 nominations

- Celia Cruz

8 nominations

- Willie Colón

7 nominations

- El Gran Combo de Puerto Rico
- Tito Puente

6 nominations

- Cachao
- Carlos Vives
- Marc Anthony

5 nominations

- Eddie Palmieri
- Juan Luis Guerra
- Luis Enrique
- Ray Barretto
- Roberto Delgado & Orquesta

4 nominations

- Albita
- Gilberto Santa Rosa
- Gloria Estefan
- Grupo Niche
- Omara Portuondo
- Spanish Harlem Orchestra

3 nominations

- Aymée Nuviola
- Juan Formell
- Oscar D'León
- Poncho Sanchez
- Tony Succar
- Victor Manuelle

2 nominations

- Bebo Valdés
- Dark Latin Groove
- Edwin Bonilla
- Eliades Ochoa
- Ibrahim Ferrer
- Jerry Rivera
- Johnny Pacheco
- Mimy Succar
- Mongo Santamaría
- Orquesta Aragón
- Tito Nieves

== See also ==
- Grammy Award for Best Salsa/Merengue Album
- Latin Grammy Award for Best Traditional Tropical Album
- Latin Grammy Award for Best Contemporary Tropical Album
- Lo Nuestro Award for Tropical Album of the Year
