= Angel Meléndez and the 911 Mambo Orchestra =

Angel Meléndez & the 911 Mambo Orchestra are a Salsa, Mambo and Latin Jazz band from Chicago. The group achieved national attention in 2005 when their debut album was nominated for a Grammy Award for Best Traditional Tropical Latin Album.
