= Emily Estefan =

American singer

- Born: Emily Marie Consuelo Estefan; December 5, 1994 (age 31); Miami Beach, Florida, U.S.
- Occupation: Music artist
- Partner: Gemeny Hernandez (2016–2025)
- Parents: Emilio Estefan (father); Gloria Estefan (mother)
- Relatives: Lili Estefan (cousin)
- Website: theofficialemilyestefan.com

Emily Marie Consuelo Estefan (born December 5, 1994) is an American singer. Her Cuban-American parents are singer Gloria Estefan and producer Emilio Estefan. Emily has produced and directed her own debut album, Take Whatever You Want published in 2017.

== Early life and education ==
Emily Estefan was born to Emilio Estefan and Gloria Estefan on December 5, 1994, in Miami Beach, Florida. Her mother Gloria was involved in a tour bus accident in 1990, and she had been told that she would never have another child. She has a brother, Nayib, who is 14 years her senior. Through her father, Estefan has Lebanese and Syrian heritage. Her maternal grandmother Gloria Fajardo (née Perez) was a Cuban nightclub performer who fled the Cuban Revolution to Dade County, Florida. Her paternal cousin is model Lili Estefan.

Estefan attended Miami Country Day School, where she excelled in basketball and music. In 2016, Estefan graduated from the Berklee College of Music in Boston, Massachusetts.

== Career ==
=== Public singing debut ===
Her public singing debut came in a 2014 performance of Where the Boys Are at the Hollywood Bowl. She performed in front of a 100,000-person audience at the "Miami Beach 100 Centennial Concert" on March 26, 2015, and performed on national television for The Today Show with her mother on April 27, 2015.

=== Debut single release ===
At the time of her debut single release on December 2, 2015, she was already regarded as an accomplished drummer, guitarist, bassist, keyboardist and singer. She has a songwriting credit for "If I Never Got to Tell You" from the musical On Your Feet!.

Estefan wrote, recorded, produced and performed her debut album Take Whatever You Want at her very own Fairy Light Studios (Boston, Massachusetts). Her mother, Gloria, directed the debut single "F#ck to Be" from the album. Estefan officially released music videos for "Reigns (Every Night)," "F#ck to Be" (two versions—clean and explicit) and "Purple Money." She founded her own music label Alien Shrimp Records—to not only launch her own music but to also serve as a home base for new and emerging artists. In 2016, she entered into a three-year partnership with RED Distribution via Alien Shrimp Records for the physical and digital distribution (U.S. and international) of the label's entire roster.

In February 2017, Estefan was selected as Elvis Duran's Artist of the Month and performed her hit "Reigns (Every Night)" on the 4th hour of NBC's Today (hosted by Hoda Kotb and Kathie Lee Gifford and broadcast nationally).

=== First concert and Kennedy Center Honors performance ===
Estefan performed her first major concert on February 2, 2017, at Gusman Concert Hall during the University of Miami Frost School of Music's Festival Miami. She played drums, guitar, and keyboard, in various music styles. Following the concert, her album Take Whatever You Want was released at 12:01 AM. Later the same year, Estefan paid tribute to her mother (who was being honored for her distinguished music career) at the Kennedy Center Honors by performing the song "Reach."

In 2020, Estefan became a co-host of Red Table Talk: The Estefans, a spin-off of the Facebook Watch talk show Red Table Talk alongside her mother Gloria and paternal cousin Lili Estefan.

== Discography ==
=== Albums ===
- Take Whatever You Want (2017)
- Estefan Family Christmas (2022)

=== Singles ===
- "F#ck to Be" (2016)
- "Reigns (Every Night)" (2017)

== Personal life ==
Estefan is openly lesbian and her parents are LGBTQ advocates. She has been in a relationship with Gemeny Hernandez since December 2016.

== Awards and honors ==
In June 2020, in honor of the 50th anniversary of the first LGBTQ Pride parade, Queerty named her among the fifty heroes "leading the nation toward equality, acceptance, and dignity for all people".
