= Spanish Harlem Orchestra =

Latin dance music orchestra

Spanish Harlem Orchestra is a Latin dance music orchestra based in the United States, founded by Aaron Levinson and Oscar Hernandez.

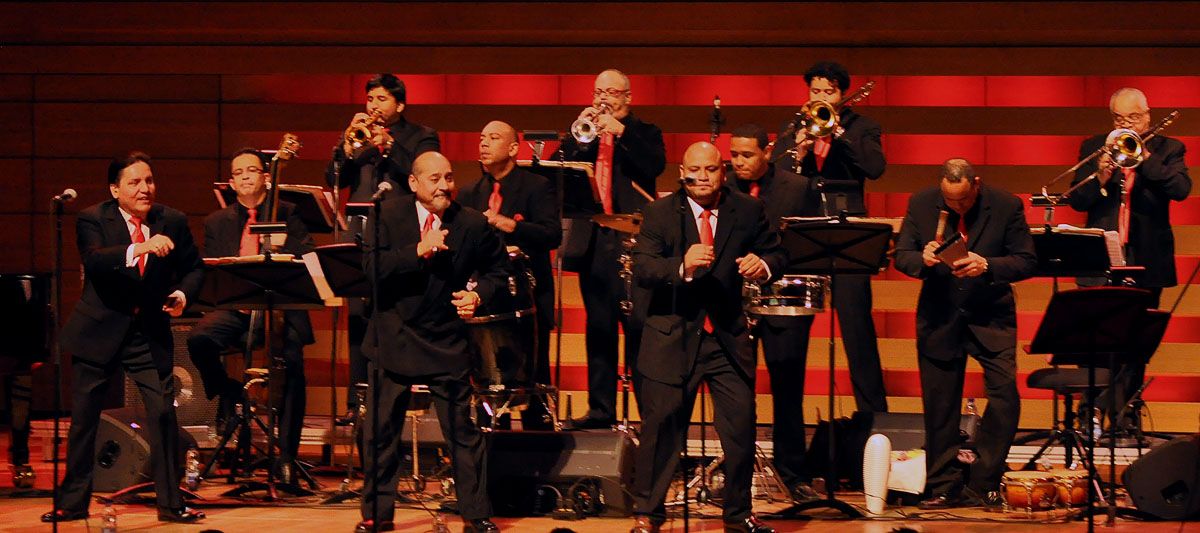
Spanish Harlem Orchestra

Their debut album was released in October 2002. The orchestra often tours worldwide.

== Discography ==
=== Un Gran Dia En El Barrio (2002) ===
1. "Mama Guela"
2. "Obsesion"
3. "Tambouri"
4. "Aprende A Querer"
5. "La Musica Es Mi Vida"
6. "La Banda"
7. "Pa' Gozar"
8. "Somos Iguales"
9. "Vale Mas Un Guaguanco"
10. "Pueblo Latino"

=== Across 110th Street (2004) ===
1. "Un Gran Dia En El Barrio"
2. "Cuando Te Vea"
3. "Tun Tún Suena El Tambor"
4. "Dime Se Llegué A Tiempo"
5. "Escucha El Ritmo"
6. "Bailadores"
7. "Te Cantaré"
8. "Como Lo Canto Yo"
9. "Maestro De Rumbero"
10. "La Hija De Lola"
11. "Perla Morena"
12. "Espérame En El Cielo"
13. "Tu Te Lo Pierdes" (Bonus Track)

=== United We Swing (2007) ===
1. "SHO Intro"
2. "Llego La Orquesta"
3. "En El Tiempo Del Palladium"
4. "Se Forma La Rumba"
5. "Sacala Bailar"
6. "Ahora Si"
7. "Que Bonito"
8. "Salsa Pa’l Bailador"
9. "Mujer Divina"
10. "Soy Candela"
11. "Plena Con Sabor"
12. "Danzon For My Father"
13. "Late In The Evening/Tarde En La Noche"

=== Viva La Tradicion (2010) ===
1. "La Salsa Dura"
2. "Mi Herencia Latina"
3. "Son De Corazon"
4. "Como Baila Mi Mulata"
5. "Si Me Quieres Te Quiero"
6. "Baila Latino"
7. "La Fiesta Empezo"
8. "Nuestra Cancion"
9. "Linda"
10. "Regalo De Dios"
11. "Rumba Urbana"
12. "El Negro Tiene Tumbao"

=== Latinos Unidos 2014 ===
1. Latinos Unidos
2. Caribe soy
3. Escucha mi son
4. Bravo soy yo
5. Canción
6. Boogachason
7. This is Mambo
8. Asi se vive
9. Dulce compañia
10. La princesa
11. Que lindas son las latinas
12. Tu y la noche y la música

=== Anniversary, 2018 ===
1. Esa Nena - (Marco Bermudez / George Delgado)
2. Yo Te Prometo - (Gil Lopez / Marco Bermudez)
3. Dime Tu - (Carlos Castante)
4. Goza El Ritmo - (Oscar Hernández)
5. Echa Pa'Lante - (Gil López / Marco Bermudez)
6. Guaracha Y Bembe - (Cheo Feliciano)
7. Y Deja - (Rubén Blades)
8. Canción Para Ti - (Oscar Hernández)
9. Como Te Quise - (Carlos Castante)
10. Tres Palabras - (Osvaldo Farrês)
11. Somos Uno (Feat. Randy Brecker) - (Oscar Hernández)
12. Soy El Tambor - (Jeremy Bosch)

=== The Latin Jazz Project, 2020 ===
1. Ritmo De Mi Gente
2. Bobo
3. Invitation
4. Acid Rain
5. Las Palmas
6. Silent Prayers
7. 'Round Midnight
8. Fort Apache
9. Latin Perspective
10. Joe and Oscar
11. Descarga de Jazz

== Awards and nominations ==
- 2005 Grammy Award for Best Salsa/Merengue Album
- 2002 Grammy nominee for "Best Salsa Album"
- 2003 Latin Billboard Award for "Salsa Album of the Year-Best New Group"
- 2010 Grammy Award for "Best Tropical Latin Album"
- 2019 Grammy Award for Best Tropical Latin Album for Anniversary
