= Pacific Mambo Orchestra =

- Origin: Oakland/San Francisco, California
- Genres: Salsa, Latin Jazz
- Occupation: Band
- Years active: 2010-present
- Website: http://www.pacificmambo.com

Pacific Mambo Orchestra is a Latin dance music orchestra based in the San Francisco Bay Area.

Their debut album was released in October 2012, and they received a Grammy Award for the album at the 56th Annual Grammy Awards.

== History ==
The Pacific Mambo Orchestra was founded in 2010 by Mexican Pianist Christian Tumalan and German Trumpeter Steffen Kuehn, and is a 19-piece Latin Big Band orchestra that plays salsa, Latin Jazz, cha cha cha, bachata, and other Latin music. In 2012 they crowd-funded their first album, the self-titled 'Pacific Mambo Orchestra', through Kickstarter. They were nominated for a Grammy Award in the "Best Tropical Latin Album" category for their album, and they won the award in 2014 at the 56th Annual Grammy Awards. The group subsequently released the albums "Live from Stern Grove (San Francisco) " in 2017, and "The III Side" in 2020.

== Discography ==
=== Pacific Mambo Orchestra (2012) ===
1. "PMO Intro" by Christian Tumalan
2. "El Cantante" originally by Rubén Blades and arranged by Mike Rinta
3. "Overjoyed" originally by Stevie Wonder and arranged by Aaron Lington
4. "La Ambicion" by Christian Tumalan
5. "Cuando Estoy Contigo" by Steffen Kuehn and Mike Rinta
6. "Mr. 5.0" by Steffen Kuehn and arranged by Aaron Lington
7. "Bolero Cocomo" by Aaron Lington, lyrics by Alexa Weber Morales
8. "Muevete Con Prisa" by Aaron Lington
9. "Querer Como Ayer" by Christian Tumalan
10. "Bolero Cocomo (Instrumental)" by Aaron Lington

Album Credits:
Steffen Kuehn: Arranger, Composer, Director, Lead, Producer, Soloist, Trumpet
Christian Tumalan: Arranger, Composer, Digital Editing, Director, Engineer, Mixing, Piano, Producer

Carlos Cascante: Featured Artist, Guest Artist, Vocals
Armando Cordoba: Maracas, Vocals
Willy Torres: Featured Artist, Guest Artist, Vocals
Kenny Washington: Featured Artist, Guest Artist, Vocals
Alexa Weber Morales: Lyricist, Vocals

Braulio Barrera: Bongos, Campana
Javier Cabanillas: Congas, Shekere
Carlos Caro: Guiro
Tommy Igoe: Drums, Featured Artist, Guest Artist
Omar Ledezma Jr.: Timbales
Christian Pepin: Congas
Karl Perazzo: Featured Artist, Guiro, Timbales

Abe Gumroyan: Bass
Jorge Pomar: Bass

Gene Burkert: Alto Saxophone Soloist
Pete Cornell: Lead Alto Saxophone, Soloist
Evan Francis: Tenor Saxophone, Flute Soloist
Aaron Lington: Arranger, Composer, Baritone Saxophone
Tony Peebles: Tenor Saxophone, Soloist
Doug Rowan: Alto Saxophone
Benny Torres: Tenor Saxophone

Ryan Black: Trombone
Jeff Cressman: Soloist, Trombone
Jaime Dubberly: Trombone
Mara Fox: Trombone
Derek James: Lead, Trombone
Mike Rinta: Arranger, Composer, Soloist, Trombone

Henry Hung: Trumpet
Louis Fasman: Lead, Trumpet
Jeff Lewis: Trumpet
Larry Lunetta: Trumpet
Tom Poole : Trumpet
Jonathan Ruff: Trumpet

Camilo Landau: Guitar (Electric)
Ray Obiedo: Featured Artist, Guest Artist, Guitar

Marcos Torres: Engineer
Steve Feasley: Engineer
Michael Lazarus: Mastering

Jack Eastgate: Artwork
Vanessa Ayala: Graphic Design

== Awards and nominations ==
- 2014 Grammy Award for "Best Tropical Latin Album"
