= Alexa Weber Morales =

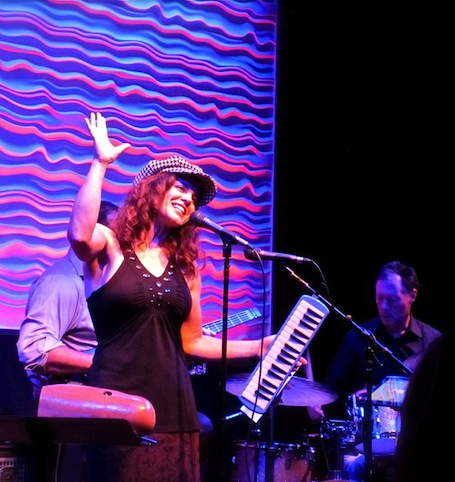

Background information
- Also known as: Alexa Morales, Alexandra Leigh-Taylor Weber Morales
- Origin: Oakland, California, United States
- Genres: Jazz, Funk, Salsa, Latin Jazz, Gospel, Brazilian Jazz
- Occupations: Singer, songwriter, producer, dancer, writer
- Instruments: vocals, piano, percussion, melodica
- Years active: 2004–present
- Labels: Crazy Monkey Productions, Patois Records, Steff Records, Tumalan Music
- Website: alexawebermorales.com

Alexa Weber Morales is a Grammy Award-winning salsa jazz singer-songwriter noted for "her flamboyantly multilingual repertoire" and based in the San Francisco Bay Area.

== Biography ==
Born in Berkeley, California, and attending schools in Berkeley, San Francisco, France, Cuba and Oakland, Alexa Weber Morales's itinerant upbringing included living on a sailboat, a VW van and an artist commune. She credits her linguistic ability, which includes fluency in Spanish, French, Portuguese and her native English, to this eclectic and international past. She was studying classical piano by the age of five and gave her first solo vocal performance at a Malcolm X Elementary School concert featuring Bobby McFerrin. She briefly majored in languages at Bryn Mawr College but dropped out in her second year. Returning to Oakland, she began working as a musician in churches, Renaissance fairs, cabarets and other local venues, while surviving on varied jobs such as roofing, auto mechanics, carpentry, translation and secretarial work. Landing a position editing a Spanish-language trade magazine led to several trips to Brazil and other South American countries, influencing her unique mix of salsa, jazz and Brazilian musical genres. After releasing her first and second albums, both produced by Wayne Wallace, she left the magazine to dedicate her time fully to a music career.

== Recording career ==
Her debut album, produced by five-time Grammy Award Nominee Wayne "The Doctor" Wallace, was released in October 2004 on the label she founded, Crazy Monkey Productions. She signed to Wallace's own indie label, Patois Records, in 2007 and co-produced her next album, "Vagabundeo/Wanderings," with Wallace that year. In addition, she wrote lyrics and sang lead vocals for Wallace's "The Reckless Search for Beauty" in 2006. In subsequent years she had vocal credits on Wallace's "Infinity," "The Nature of the Beat" and "Bien! Bien." In 2011, Alexa Weber Morales joined the then-new 19-piece mambo/salsa band Pacific Mambo Orchestra. Leaving Patois Records, she launched a successful Kickstarter campaign and self-produced the all-original album "I Wanna Work For You." After assisting with Pacific Mambo Orchestra's successful 2012 Kickstarter effort, she recorded and composed for their eponymous debut album, which received a Grammy Award for the album at the 56th Annual Grammy Awards. Controversy around the upset win by the indie orchestra over super stars such as Marc Anthony and Carlos Vives led to international press coverage.

== Performing career ==
Her versatile voice and ample range have been described various ways: As an "ardent, throaty alto that soars effortlessly into a crystalline soprano register," "sensually soaring," "lush, rangey" and "boundary-busting," and "dark, creamy vocals".

Morales is also well known for her on-stage charisma, which fans regularly praise. She has opened for Lenny Williams (Tower of Power) and Average White Band.

She joined Pacific Mambo Orchestra in 2011 because of its live performances Monday nights at Cafe Cocomo in San Francisco and soon became "the voice of the band." When Pacific Mambo Orchestra was signed to Columbia Artist Management in 2013, Alexa and the band toured US performing arts centers with special guests Tito Puente Jr., Marlow Rosado and Willy Torres.

== Discography ==
=== Jazzmérica (Crazy Monkey Productions, 2004) ===
1. "But I'm Weak" by Alexa Weber Morales
2. "I Did It, I Live It" by Alexa Weber Morales and Wayne Wallace
3. "All Blues" originally by Miles Davis
4. "Les Feuilles Mortes/Autumn Leaves" by Joseph Kosma, Jacques Prevert and Johnny Mercer
5. "Down in the Everglades" by Alexa Weber Morales
6. "Smile Please" by Stevie Wonder
7. "Luz do Sol" by Caetano Veloso
8. "Mountains to Flatten" by Alexa Weber Morales
9. "Morning" by Clare Fischer
10. "Your Love" by Alexa Weber Morales
11. "Play That Song of Love and Rage" by Alexa Weber Morales

=== Vagabundeo/Wanderings (Patois Records/Crazy Monkey Productions, 2007) ===
1. "Habanera" by Georges Bizet
2. "Ave Rara" by Edu Lobo and Aldir Blanc
3. "Calling You" by Bob Telson
4. "El Cantante" by Ruben Blades
5. "Agua de Beber/Aguas de Marco" by Antonio Carlos Jobim and Vinicius de Moraes
6. "Her Ways Wander" by Alexa Weber Morales, Vince Mansel and Wayne Wallace
7. "The Goddess of War" by Alexa Weber Morales
8. "Así Es El Amor" by Alexa Weber Morales
9. "Angelitos Negros" by Andrés Eloy Blanco and Manuel Alvarez Maciste
10. "Tu Amor" by Alexa Weber Morales
11. "You Cry, I Dry Your Tears" by Alexa Weber Morales

=== I Wanna Work For You (Crazy Monkey Productions, 2011) ===
1. "I Wanna Work For You" by Alexa Weber Morales
2. "Quisiera Retroceder El Tiempo" by Alexa Weber Morales
3. "I'm Your Man" by Alexa Weber Morales
4. "Into the Stratosphere" by Alexa Weber Morales
5. "When the Night is Cool" by Alexa Weber Morales
6. "Catastrofe de Amor" by Alexa Weber Morales
7. "I Didn't Drill That Deep" by Alexa Weber Morales
8. "The Names of the Winds" by Alexa Weber Morales
9. "I Think of You" by Alexa Weber Morales
10. "Let's Not Ruin This Affair" by Alexa Weber Morales
11. "I Loves You Porgy" by George Gershwin

== Recording credits ==
Lead vocals, lyrics, co-composition:

- "Bolero Cocomo" by Alexa Weber Morales and Aaron Lington, "Pacific Mambo Orchestra," Tumalan Music/Steff Records, 2012
- "Fallin'" by Alicia Keys, "Proyecto Lando," Cabeza e' Comba Productions, 2009
- "Use Me" by Bill Withers, "The Reckless Search for Beauty," Patois Records, 2006
- "Obatala/Afro Blue" by Mongo Santamaria, "The Reckless Search for Beauty," Patois Records, 2006
- "El Duende Africano" by Wayne Wallace, "The Reckless Search for Beauty," Patois Records, 2006
- "El Rio de Oro" by Wayne Wallace, "The Reckless Search for Beauty," Patois Records, 2006

== Publications ==
In 2014, Alexa Weber Morales published the book Practice Secrets of the Pros: Motivation, Method and Memory for Musicians... and Other Athletes.

== Awards and nominations ==
- 2014 Grammy Award for "Best Tropical Latin Album" with Pacific Mambo Orchestra
- 2011 Grammy Nomination for "Best Latin Jazz Album" with Wayne Wallace
- 2011 Latin Jazz Corner Outer Edges Award for "I Wanna Work For You"
