= Emilio Estefan =

Cuban-American musician (born 1953)

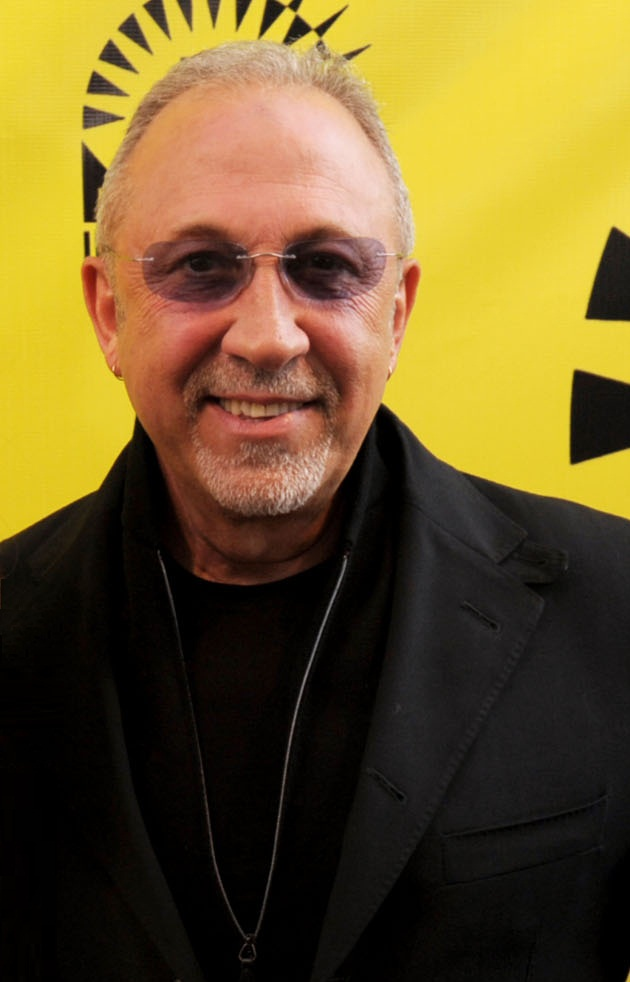
- Estefan at the 2014 Miami International Film Festival premiere of An Unbreakable Bond
- Born: Emilio Estefan Gómez; March 4, 1953 (age 73); Santiago de Cuba, Cuba
- Other name: Emilio Estefan Jr.
- Occupations: Musician; producer
- Years active: 1974–present
- Spouse: Gloria Fajardo García (m. 1978)
- Children: 2, including Emily
- Relatives: Lili Estefan (niece)
- Musical career
- Genres: Bachata; Latin pop; dance-pop; salsa; pop; adult contemporary; club-dance
- Label: Sony
- Formerly of: Miami Sound Machine

Emilio Estefan Gómez (born March 4, 1953) is a Cuban-American musician and producer. Estefan has won 19 Grammy Awards. He first came to prominence as a member of the Miami Sound Machine. He is the husband of singer Gloria Estefan, father of son Nayib Estefan and daughter Emily Estefan, and the uncle of Spanish-language television personality Lili Estefan.

Estefan is credited with paving the way for the crossover explosion of Latin music of the late 90s, mostly through artists that Estefan himself brought to the forefront of the US music stage, including his wife Gloria Estefan, as well as Jon Secada, Ricky Martin, and Shakira.

Estefan received the BMI "Songwriter of the Year" award in 2005 and a star on the Hollywood Walk of Fame. He also received the Sammy Cahn Lifetime Achievement Award from the Songwriters' Hall of Fame in 2009.

In November 2015, President Barack Obama awarded Estefan the Presidential Medal of Freedom, the nation's highest civilian honor. In 2019 he also received the Gershwin Prize from the Library of Congress.

== Background ==
Emilio Estefan Gómez was born in Santiago de Cuba, Cuba to Emilio Jorge Estefan Pecile (1917–2003) and Carmen María Gómez Vázquez (1921–2006). His father Emilio Estefan Sr. was born in Cuba to Lebanese parents and was the second child in a family which consisted of eleven siblings—many of whom were textile traders that traveled throughout Cuba and the Caribbean. Emilio Sr. was raised by his widowed mother Júlia, as his father had died when he was still a child. Estefan's maternal grandparents Antonio and Carmen were Spanish from Galicia who met while the latter was working for the Bacardi family.

In 1967, at the age of fourteen, Estefan and his father Emilio Sr. fled Cuba for Spain to escape the Castro regime. The Estefan family planned to reunite in the United States and, as a result, Carmen chose to remain behind because she did not want to abandon her parents. In addition, Estefan's older brother José (b. 1945) was drafted into the military and could not leave Cuba until 1980. For about a year, Estefan and his father lived an impoverished life in Spain before relocating permanently to Miami, Florida. Although circumstances were far better in Miami, Estefan and Emilio Sr. still struggled as they lived in a cramped house with Estefan's aunt and 8 cousins. Estefan did not reunite with his mother until 1971 when she was finally able to emigrate to the United States.

It was during his formative years that Estefan cultivated his musical sensibilities, as he had often used his accordion-playing skills to earn enough tips to support his father and family.

== Professional career ==
=== Early music ===
In 1975, Gloria and her cousin Mercedes "Merci" Navarro (1957–2007) met Estefan while performing at a church ensemble rehearsal. Estefan, who had formed the band the Miami Latin Boys earlier that year, learned about Gloria through a mutual acquaintance. While the Miami Latin Boys were performing at a Cuban wedding at Hotel Dupont, Gloria and Merci (who were wedding guests) performed two Cuban standards impromptu. They impressed the Miami Latin Boys so much that they were invited to join the band permanently with the band's name changing to Miami Sound Machine. Gloria, who was attending the University of Miami at the time, only agreed to perform during the weekends so that her studies would not be interrupted.

Eventually, Miami Sound Machine would perform with Gloria Estefan (née Fajardo) as the lead singer and headliner.

=== Producer ===
As a producer, Estefan has shaped and developed the careers of many music superstars. His influential role in the Latin Boom of the late ‘90s and early ‘00s is reflected in his production and songwriting on albums by Shakira (Laundry Service and Donde estan los ladrones?), Ricky Martin (Ricky Martin and Sound Loaded), Jennifer Lopez (On the 6), Jon Secada, Marc Anthony, Thalia, and others.

He has also produced various events for both general market and Hispanic market television. These events include the Latin Grammys, Hispanic Heritage Awards, Nuestra Navidad, and some high-profile productions on HBO and Showtime. He has also produced many musical events at the White House.

In 2008, Estefan produced and directed his first full-length documentary 90 Millas to showcase the history and pioneers of Cuban music.

Estefan gathered dozens of Latino entertainers in 2010 to record Michael Jackson's "We Are The World" in Spanish. The Spanish language version, already written by Estefan and approved by Quincy Jones, became "Somos El Mundo". It premiered during El Show de Cristina on March 1, 2010 and the funds went to the Haiti relief.

Also, in 2010, Estefan released his book The Rhythm of Success – How an Immigrant Produced His Own American Dream.

The following year, Estefan presented the book The Exile Experience: A Journey to Freedom in collaboration with writer Carlos Pintado and journalist Carlos Alberto Montaner, which included personal testimonials from different generations of exiles. The Exile Experience: Journey to Freedom is published in three separate editions – each tailor-made for those who arrived through Operation Pedro Pan, the Freedom Flights and the Mariel boatlift. Each edition features the names of every Cuban who arrived via one of those three exoduses, and there has been an accumulation of more than 400,000 names amongst the three editions published.

He partnered with the Nederlander Group in 2013 to produce the Broadway musical extravaganza, On Your Feet! The musical is based on the life and musical legacy of the Estefans and Fajardos. On Your Feet! premiered on Broadway in October 2015.

Estefan also became an AARP Life Reimagined ambassador in 2013. In his new role, Emilio shares his views on a variety of subjects, including living, mentoring, entrepreneurship, and philanthropy.

In February 2014, Estefan directed and produced the documentary film An Unbreakable Bond about the real-life story of father-son duo Marc and Nick Buoniconti's undying commitment towards finding a cure for paralysis. The film premiered at National & International film festivals.

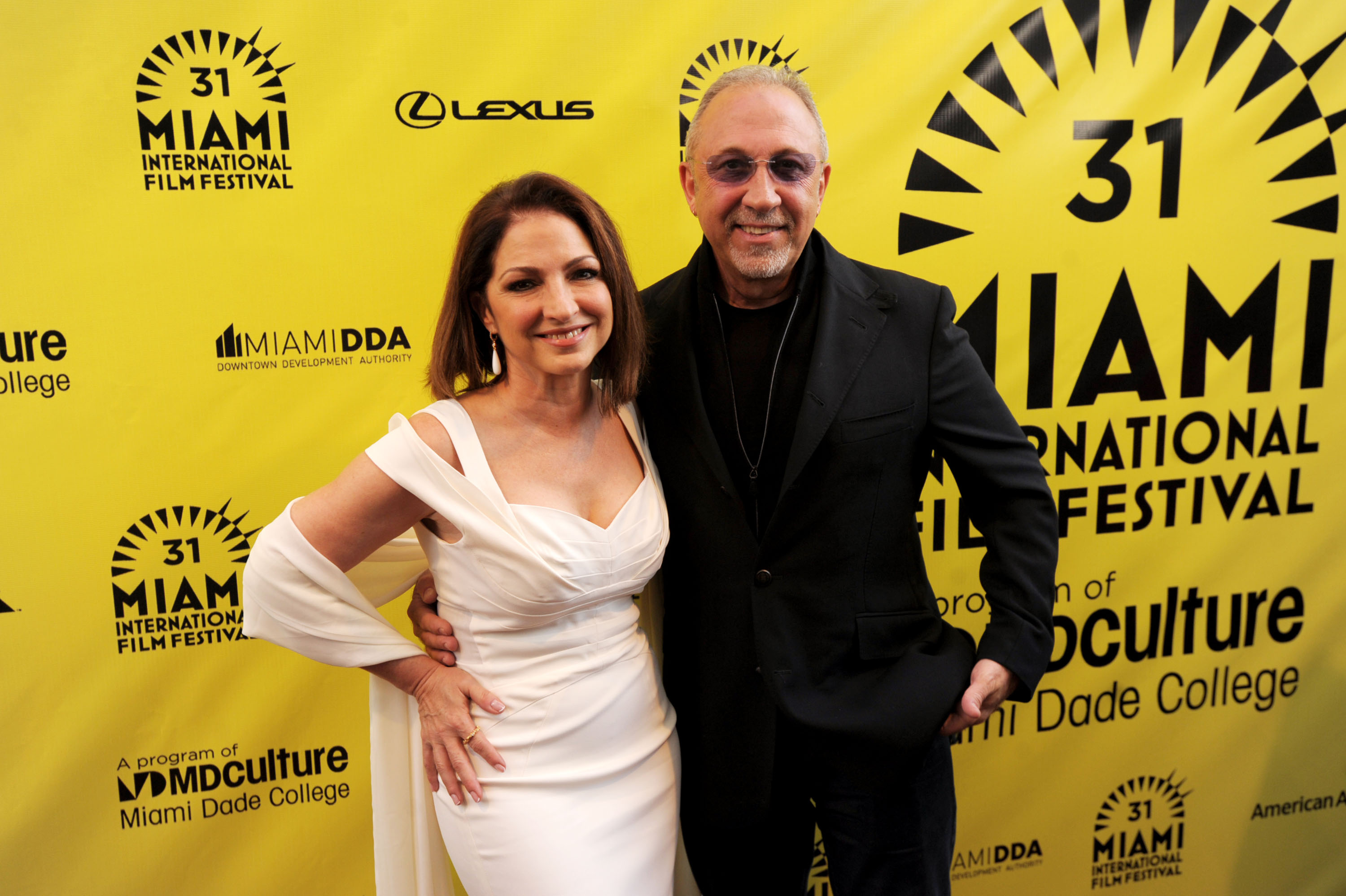
Gloria and Emilio Estefan at the 2014 Miami International Film Festival premiere of An Unbreakable Bond

In early 2014, in a decision unanimously approved by the County Commission, Estefan was appointed Miami-Dade Special Ambassador by Miami-Dade County Commissioner Jean Monestime. In his unpaid four-year non-partisan role, Emilio was set to represent the Miami-Dade community at an international level to encourage and promote the diversity of business and trade. During the same year, Estefan and Botrán Rum created a strategic marketing alliance including a personal endorsement by Estefan. Through his role, Estefan will help promote the brand throughout the U.S., leading a multi-channel marketing campaign with the mantra "The Night Begins with Botran."

Estefan sits as a museum board member of the National Museum of the American Latino having been appointed in 2009 to the joint presidential and congressional commission that first explored its creation.

=== Other business ventures ===
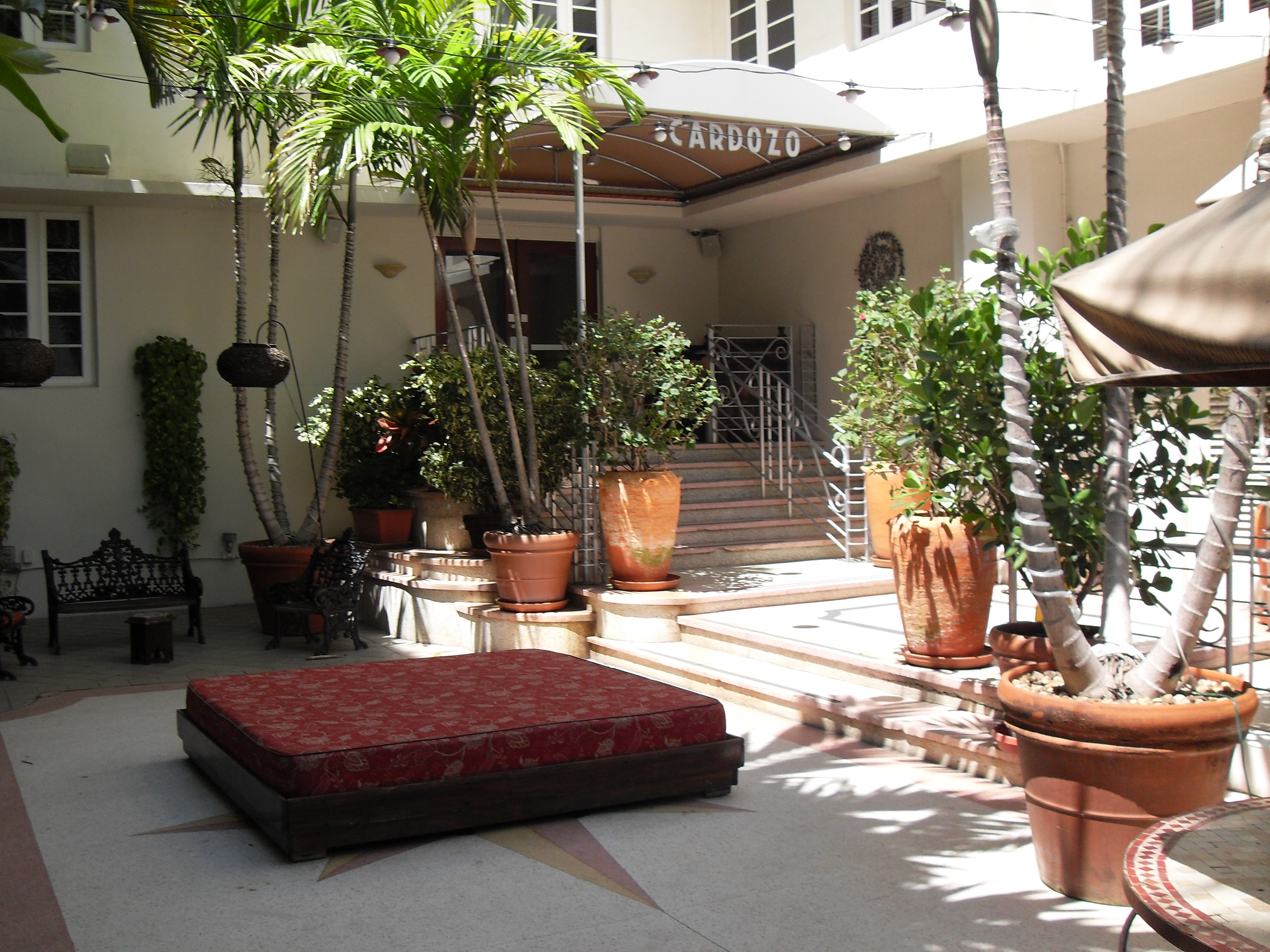
The Cardozo hotel on Ocean Drive, in Miami Beach, Florida.

Gloria and Emilio Estefan own a number of business establishments, including several Cuban-themed restaurants (Bongos Cuban Café; Larios on the Beach). The restaurants are located in Miami Beach, downtown Miami (part of the American Airlines Arena), at the Seminole Hard Rock Hotel and Casino in Hollywood, Florida, Walt Disney World's Disney Springs in Orlando, Florida, and at Miami International Airport. They also own two hotels: Costa d'Este in Vero Beach which opened in 2008, and The Cardozo in Miami Beach. In June 2009, Estefan and his wife became the first Hispanics to buy a minor ownership stake in an NFL team, the Miami Dolphins. According to articles published in People en Español and AARP Magazine, the Estefans' estimated net worth as of 2011 was approximately $700 million.

Estefan and his wife Gloria Estefan voiced the characters Emilio and Gloria, radio hosts of Radio La Ola, in the 2026 video game Grand Theft Auto VI.

== Awards ==
In 1994, Estefan was awarded the El Premio Billboard award for his work in the Latin music industry. In the same year, he was given the Excellence Award at the 1994 Lo Nuestro Awards. At the Latin Grammy Awards of 2000, Estefan received the award for Producer of the Year for his work on the albums Ciego de Amor by Charlie Zaa, El Amor de Mi Tierra by Carlos Vives and was recognized as the first Person of the Year by the Latin Recording Academy.

In 2002, he was appointed to the President's Committee on the Arts and Humanities by President George W. Bush. In 2005, Estefan received the BMI "Songwriter of the Year" award and a star on the Hollywood Walk of Fame. Estefan has received honorary doctoral degrees from Barry University, the University of Miami, Florida International University and the Berklee College of Music. He also received the Sammy Cahn Lifetime Achievement Award from the Songwriters' Hall of Fame and the Ellis Island Medal of Honor in 2009.

Estefan was inducted into the Latin Songwriters Hall of Fame in 2014. In November 2015, President Barack Obama awarded Estefan and his wife Gloria with the nation's highest civilian honor—the Presidential Medal of Freedom. They were also awarded Lo Nuestro Excellence Award in 2018 and the Gershwin Prize in 2019 from the Library of Congress.

== Personal life ==
Estefan became romantically involved with the Miami Sound Machine's lead singer Gloria Fajardo in 1976. They married on September 2, 1978, and have a son, Nayib (born September 2, 1980), and a daughter, Emily (born December 5, 1994). The family reside on Star Island.

Emily is a recording artist. Nayib is a filmmaker and owner of the Nite Owl Theater in Miami. On June 5, 2010, Nayib married Lara Diamante Coppola in the backyard of his parents' house. On June 21, 2012, the first Estefan grandchild was born: grandson Sasha Argento Coppola Estefan. Gloria Estefan has said that "Sasha" is a name of Russian descent meaning "benefactor of mankind", and was a possible name for her and Emilio's son, Nayib.
