= Latin Grammy Award for Best Salsa Album =

Music award category

- Awarded for: vocal or instrumental salsa albums containing at least 51% of newly recorded material
- Country: United States
- Presented by: The Latin Recording Academy
- First award: 2000
- Currently held by: Rubén Blades and Roberto Delgado & Orquesta for Fotografías (2025)
- Website: latingrammy.com

The Latin Grammy Award for Best Salsa Album is an honor presented annually by the Latin Academy of Recording Arts & Sciences at the Latin Grammy Awards, a ceremony that recognizes excellence and promotes a wider awareness of cultural diversity and contributions of Latin recording artists in the United States and internationally.

According to the category description guide for the 2012 Latin Grammy Awards, the award is for vocal or instrumental salsa albums containing at least 51 percent of newly recorded material. It is awarded to solo artists, duos or groups.

The accolade for Best Salsa Album was first presented to Cuban singer Celia Cruz at the 1st Latin Grammy Awards ceremony in 2000 for her album Celia Cruz and Friends: A Night of Salsa (1999). American singer Marc Anthony and Panamanian singer Rubén Blades hold the record of most wins in the category with four each, followed by Celia Cruz and Roberto Delgado & Orquesta with three wins each. Gilberto Santa Rosa holds the record for most nominations, with nine.

At the 18th Annual Latin Grammy Awards in 2017, Rubén Blades and Roberto Delgado & Orquesta won both this awards and Album of the Year for their collaborative album Salsa Big Band.

== Winners and nominees ==
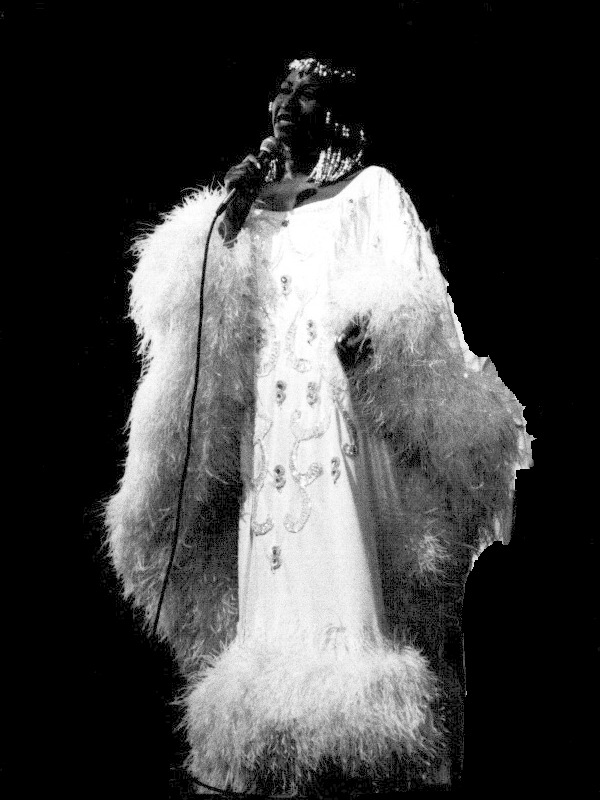
Celia Cruz was the inaugural winner in 2000 for Celia Cruz and Friends: A Night of Salsa. She has also won the awards two more times.

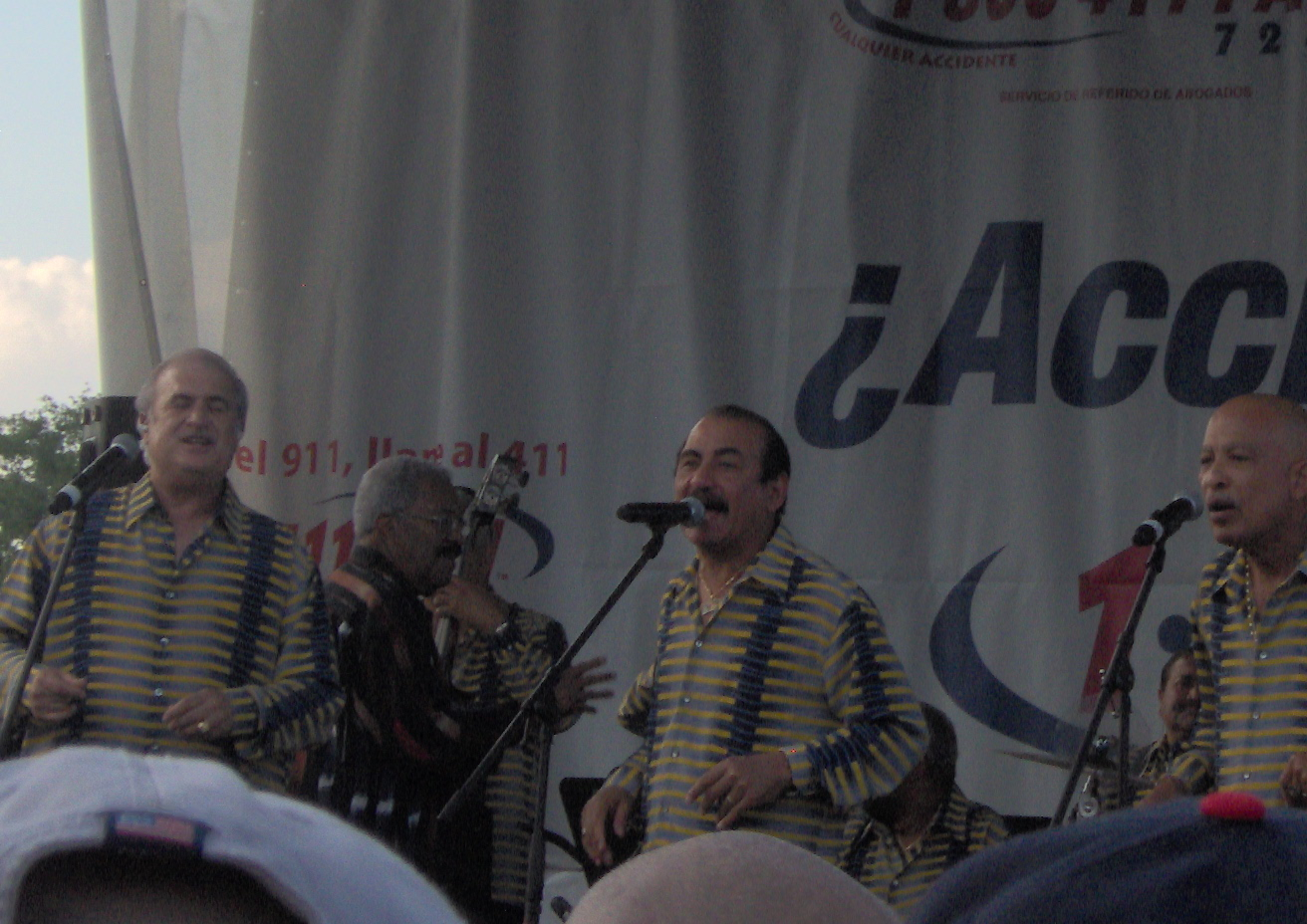
Two-time winners El Gran Combo de Puerto Rico

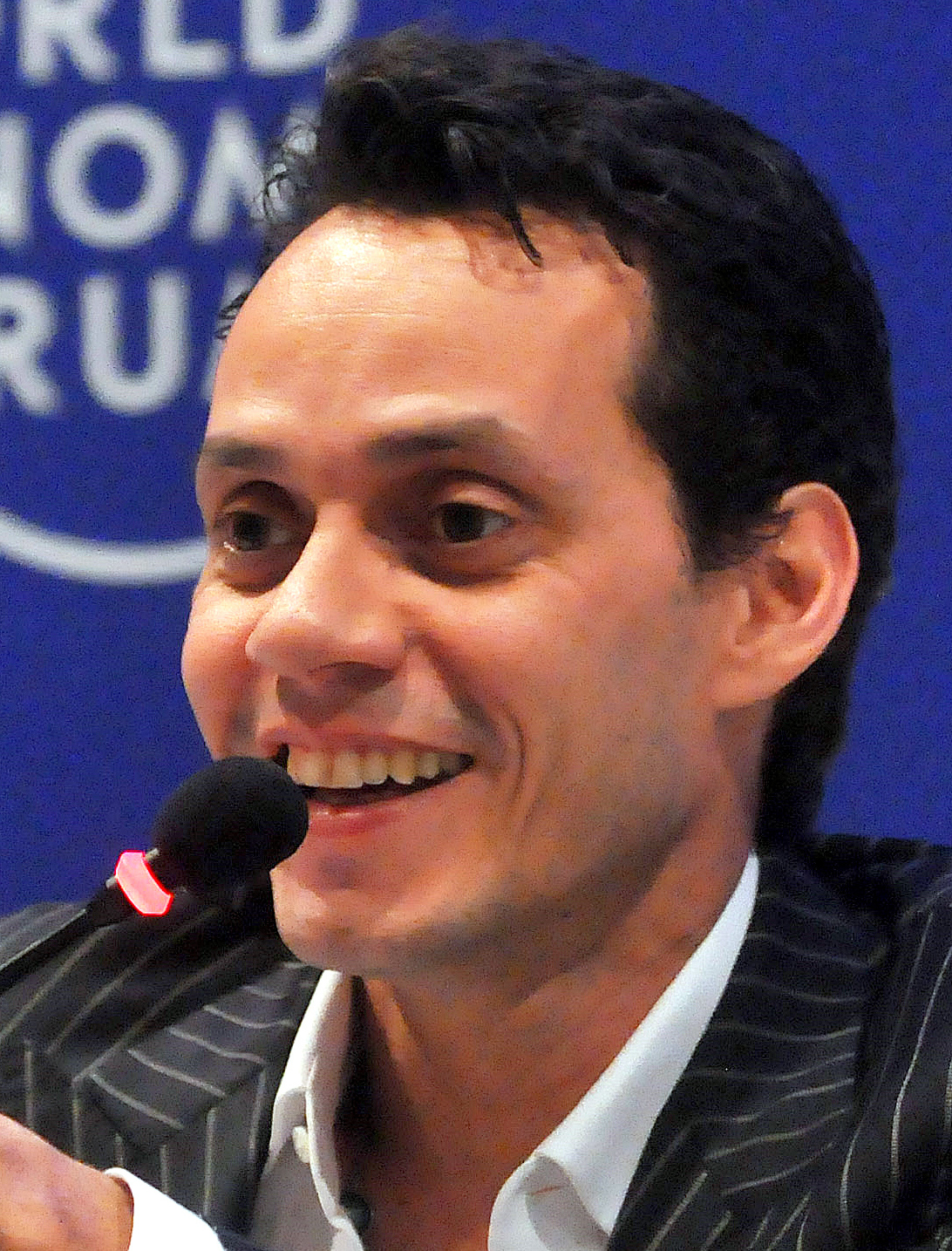
Four-time winner Marc Anthony.

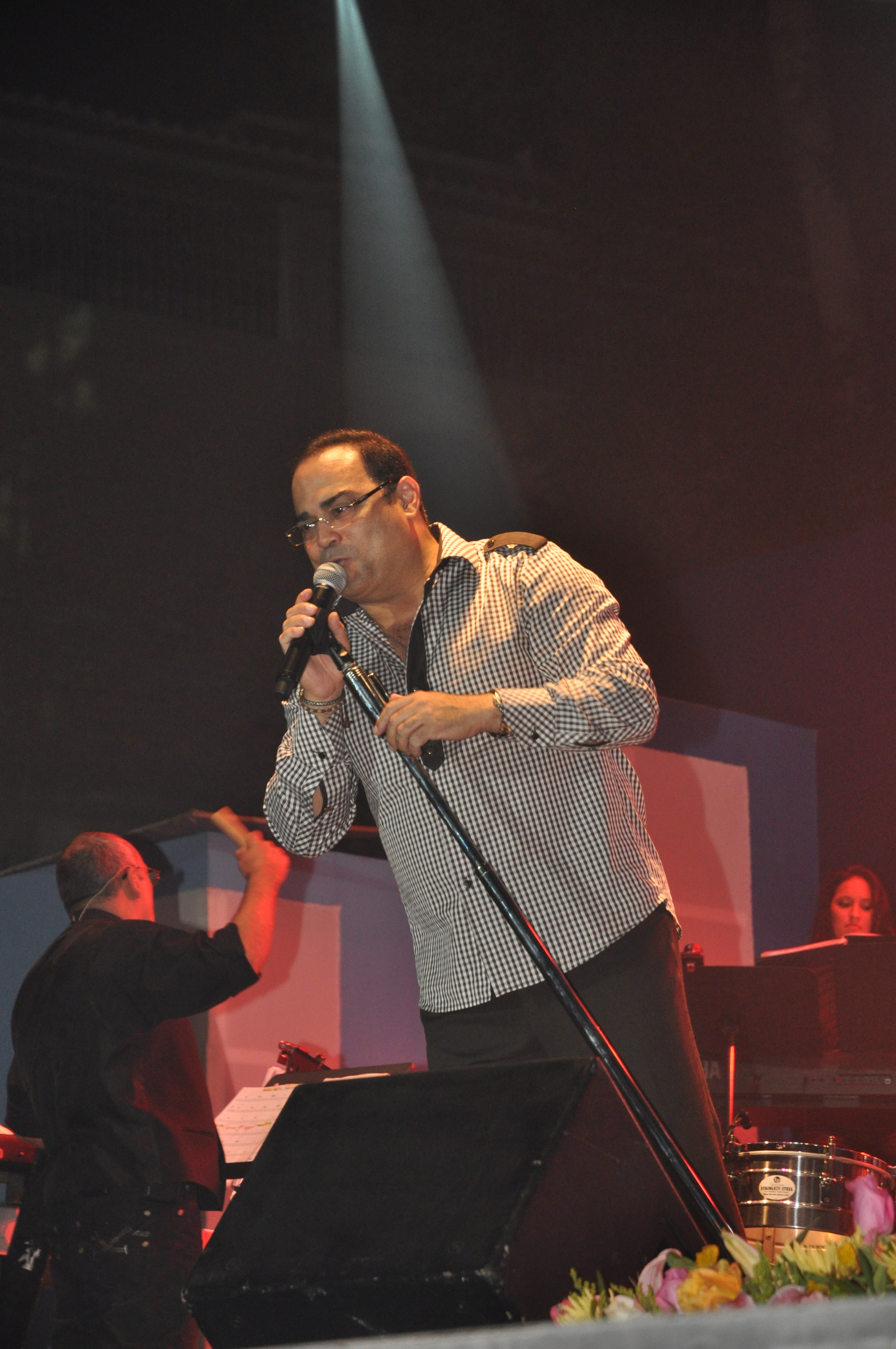
Two-time winner Gilberto Santa Rosa.

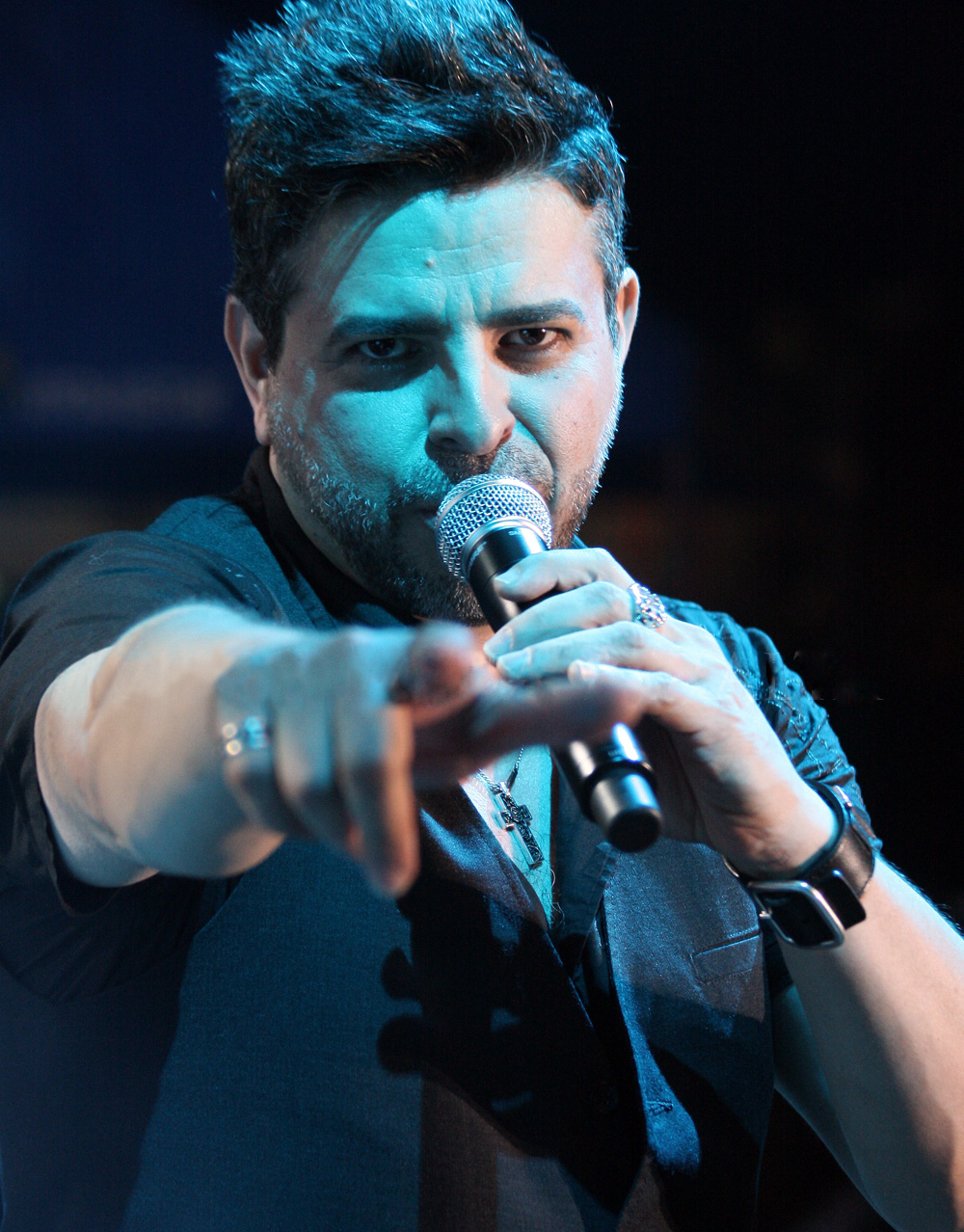
Luis Enrique is the first and so far only Nicaraguan to win the award.

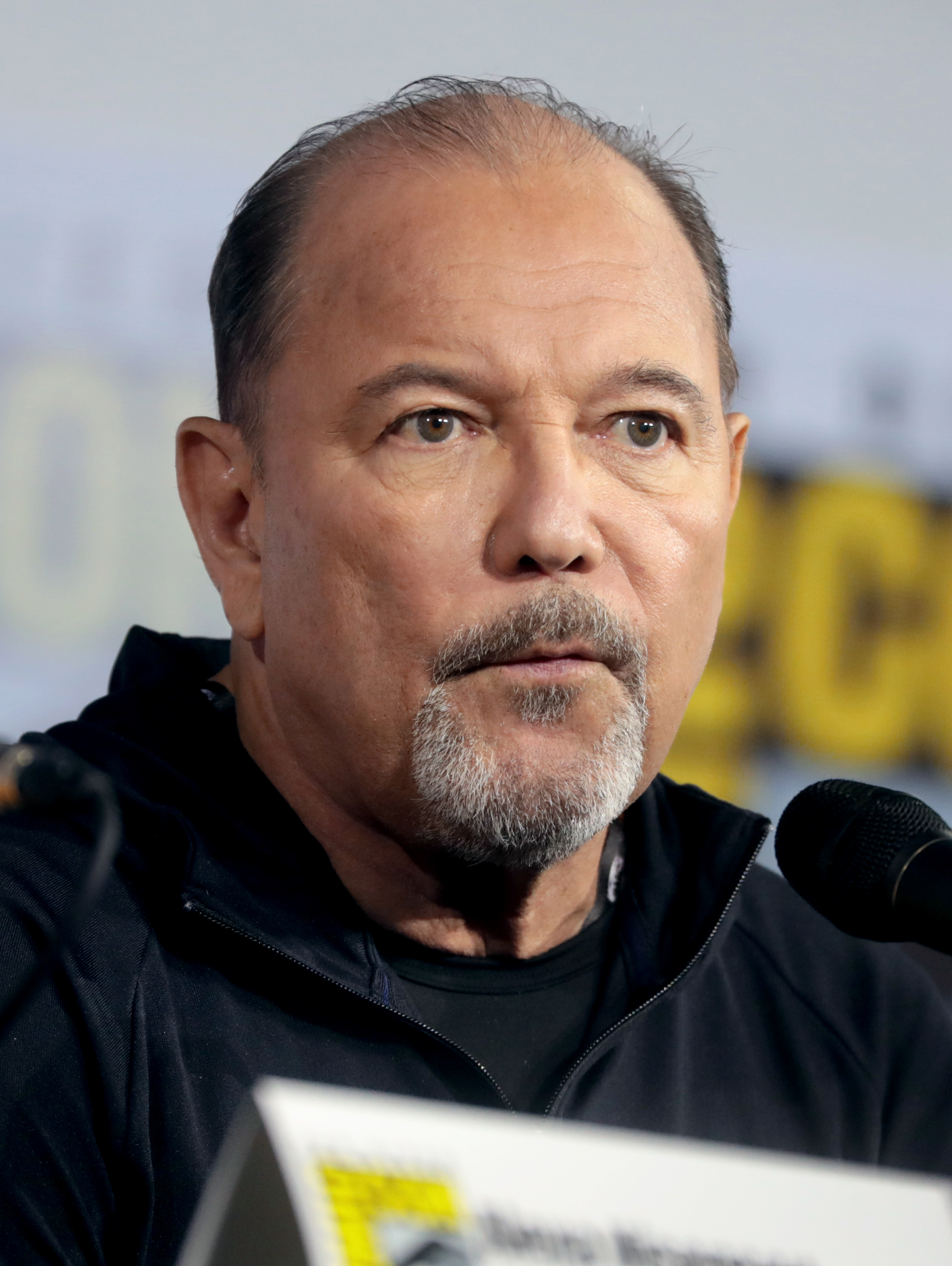
Six-time winner Rubén Blades.

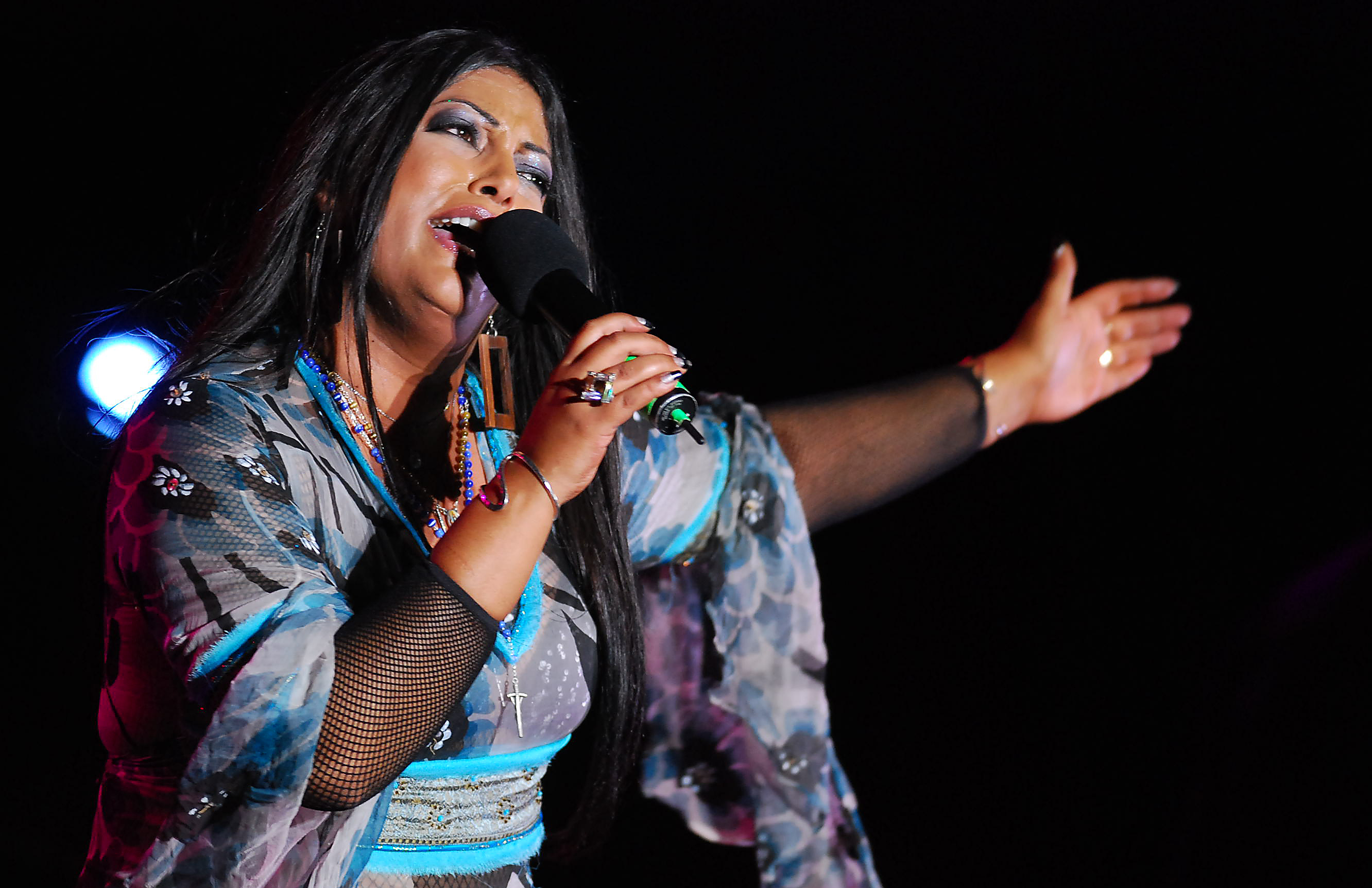
La India won the award in 2016.

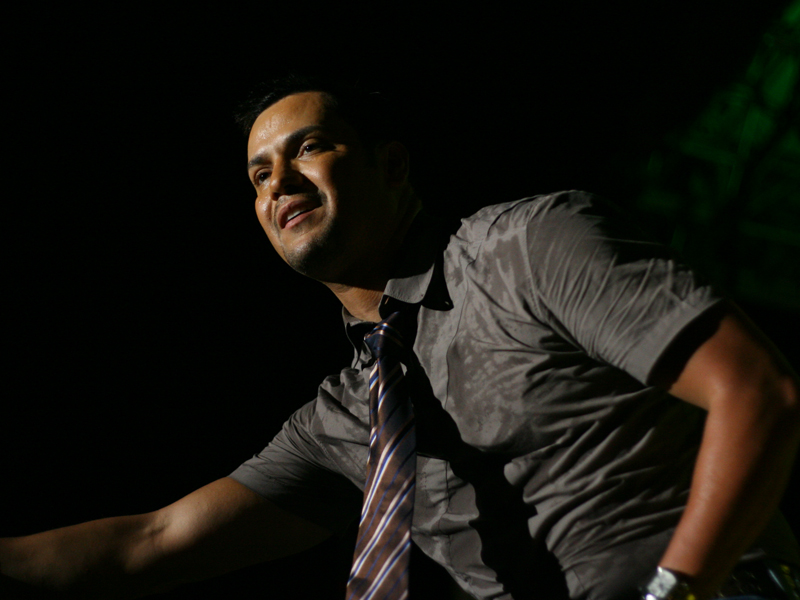
Victor Manuelle won the award in 2018.

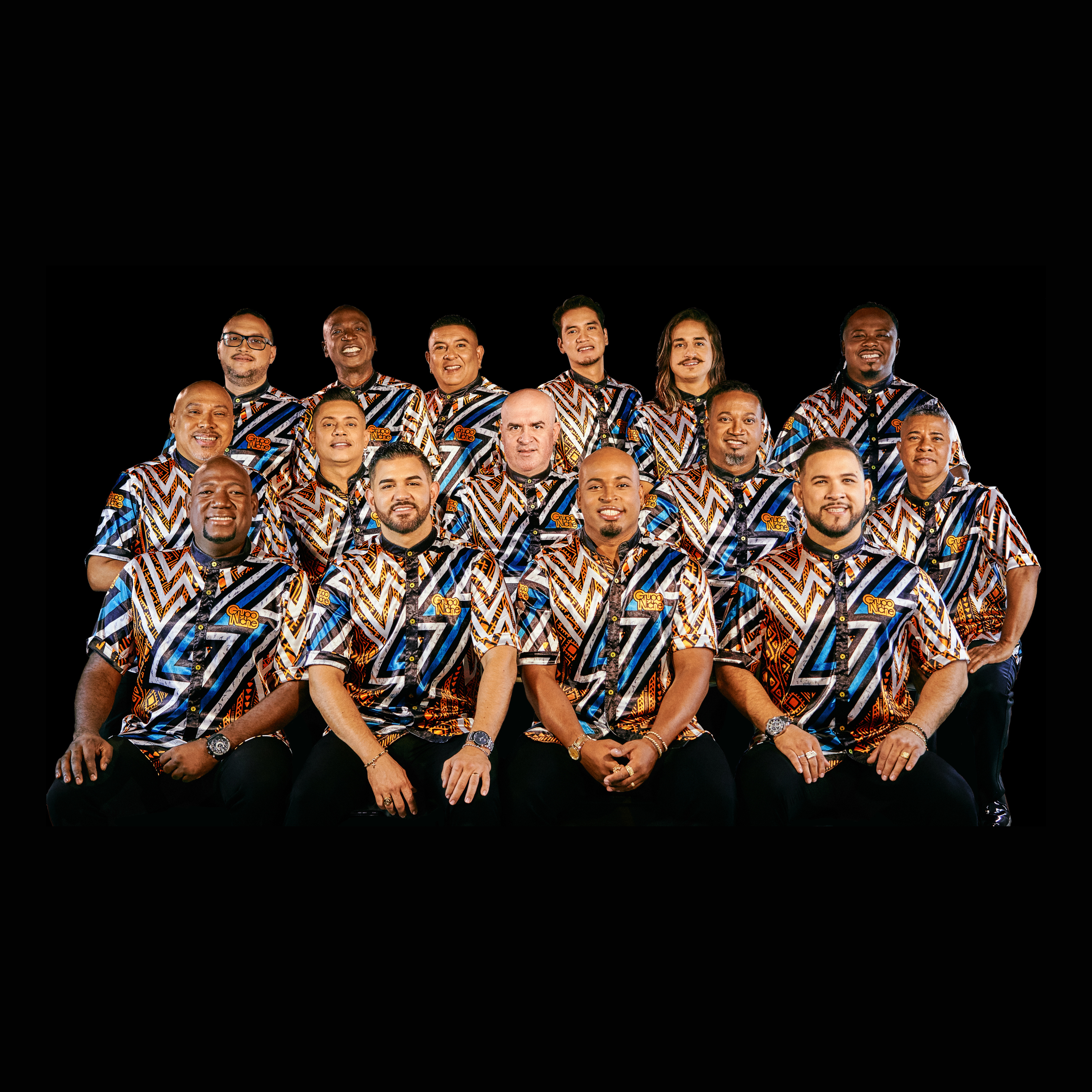
Two-time winners Grupo Niche.

Year^{[I]}	Performing artist(s)	Work	Nominees^{[II]}	Ref.
2000	(Cuba) Celia Cruz	Celia Cruz and Friends: A Night of Salsa	Oscar D'León – La Formula Original; Gilberto Santa Rosa – Expresión; Son by Four – Son by Four; Los Van Van – Llegó . . . Van Van: Van Van Is Here	
2001	(United States) Tito Puente and Eddie Palmieri	Obra Maestra	Oscar D'León and Wladimir – Doble Play; Issac Delgado – La Fórmula/Malecón; Grupo Niche – Propuesta; Tito Rojas – Rompiendo Noches; Gilberto Santa Rosa – Intenso	
2002	(Cuba) Celia Cruz	La Negra Tiene Tumbao	Marc Anthony – Libre; Giro – Mi Nostalgia; El Gran Combo de Puerto Rico – Nuevo Milenio~El Mismo Sabor; Tito Rojas – Quiero Llegar A Casa	
2003	El Gran Combo de Puerto Rico	40 Aniversario En Vivo	Oscar D'León – Infinito; La India – Latin Song Bird: Mi Alma y Corazón; Gilberto Santa Rosa – Viceversa; Víctor Manuelle – Le Preguntaba a La Luna	
2004	(Cuba) Celia Cruz	Regalo del Alma	Tito Nieves – Tito Nieves canta con el Conjunto Clásico: 25 Aniversario Recuerdos; Jerry Rivera – Canto a Mi Ídolo… Frankie Ruiz; Los Van Van – Van Van Live at Miami Arena; Víctor Manuelle – Travesía	
2005	(United States) Marc Anthony	Valió la Pena	Oscar D'León – Así Soy...; El Gran Combo de Puerto Rico – Aquí Estamos y... ¡De Verdad!; Gilberto Santa Rosa – Auténtico; Spanish Harlem Orchestra – Across 110th Street	
2006	(Puerto Rico) Gilberto Santa Rosa	Directo Al Corazón	La India – Soy Diferente; Tito Nieves – Hoy, Mañana y Siempre; Gilberto Santa Rosa and El Gran Combo de Puerto Rico – Asi Es Nuestra Navidad; Victor Manuelle – Decisión Unánime	
2007	El Gran Combo de Puerto Rico	Arroz Con Habichuela	Willy Chirino – 35 Aniversario: En Vivo; Issac Delgado – En Primera Plana; Andy Montañez – El Godfather De La Salsa; Tito Nieves – Canciones Clásicas de Marco Antonio Solís	
2008	(United States) Marc Anthony	El Cantante	Grupo Galé – Auténtico; Maelo Ruiz – Puro Corazón...; Gilberto Santa Rosa – Contraste; Victor Manuelle – Soy	
2009	(Nicaragua) Luis Enrique	Ciclos	Oscar D'León – Tranquilamente... Tranquilo; Issac Delgado – Así Soy; José Lugo Orchestra – Guasábara; Gilberto Santa Rosa – Contraste en Salsa	
2010	(Puerto Rico) Gilberto Santa Rosa	Irrepetible	Huey Dunbar – Huey Dunbar IV; La India – Unica; Orquesta Guayacán – Bueno y Mas; Mario Ortiz All Star Band – Tributo 45 Aniversario	
2011	(Panama) Rubén Blades and Seis Del Solar	Todos Vuelven Live	Edwin Bonilla – Homenaje a Los Rumberos; José Alberto "El Canario" – Original; Spanish Harlem Orchestra – Viva La Tradición; Various Artists; Isidro Infante (producer) – Salsa: Un Homenaje a El Gran Combo	
2012	(Nicaragua) Luis Enrique	Soy y Seré	Rubén Blades and Cheo Feliciano – Eba Say Ajá; Mambo Legend Orchestra – Watch Out! Ten Cuidao!; Tito Nieves – Mi Última Grabación; Víctor Manuelle – Busco un Pueblo	
2013	(United States) Various Artists: Sergio George, producer	Sergio George Presents: Salsa Giants	Albita – Una Mujer Que Canta; Guayacán – 25 Años, 25 Éxitos, 25 Artistas; Víctor Manuelle – Me Llamaré Tuyo; Tito Nieves – Que Seas Feliz; Gilberto Santa Rosa – Gilberto Santa Rosa	
2014	(United States) Marc Anthony	3.0	Maite Hontelé – Déjame Así; Tito Nieves – Mis Mejores Recuerdos; Aymée Nuviola – First Class To Havana; Mario Ortiz All Star Band – 50 Aniversario	
2015	(Panama) Rubén Blades & Roberto Delgado & Orquesta	Son De Panamá	Luis Enrique – Jukebox Primera Edición; Víctor Manuelle – Que Suenen los Tambores; Ismael Miranda – Son 45; Rey Ruiz – Estaciones	
2016	(Puerto Rico) La India	Intensamente India Con Canciones De Juan Gabriel	Grupo Niche – 35 Aniversario; José Lugo and Guasábara Combo – ¿Dónde Están?; Bobby Valentín – Mi Ritmo es Bueno; Johnny Ventura – Tronco Viejo	
2017	(Panama) Rubén Blades & Roberto Delgado & Orquesta	Salsa Big Band	Alberto Barros – Tributo A La Salsa Colombiana 7; Juan Pablo Díaz – Fase Dos; Alain Pérez – ADN; Various Artists; Isidro Infante (album producer) – Isidro Infante Presenta... Cuba y Puerto Rico, Un Abrazo Musical Salsero	
2018	(United States) Víctor Manuelle	25/7	Alexander Abreu & Havana D'Primera – Cantor del Pueblo; Charlie Aponte – Pa' Mi Gente; Chiquito Team Band – Los Creadores del Sonido; Pete Perignon – La Esquina del Bailador	
2019	(Peru) (United States) Tony Succar	Mas De Mi	Maite Hontelé – Cuba Linda; Mario Ortiz All Star Band – 55 Aniversario; Eddie Palmieri – Mi Luz Mayor; Quintero's Salsa Project – Nuestro Hogar	
2020	(Colombia) Grupo Niche	40	Luisito Ayala and La Puerto Rican Power – 40 Años de Power; Charlie Cruz – Tentaciones Vol. 1; Víctor Manuelle – Memorias de Navidad; Tito Rojas – Un Gallo para la Historia	
2021	(Panama) Rubén Blades & Roberto Delgado & Orquesta	SALSA PLUS!	El Gran Combo de Puerto Rico – En Cuarentena; Willy García – El Día es Hoy; Gilberto Santa Rosa – Colegas; Varios Artistas; José Gaviria & Milton Salcedo, album producers – En Barranquilla Me Quedo, El Disco Homenaje a Joe Arroyo	
2022	(United States) Marc Anthony	Pa'llá Voy	Alexander Abreu & Havana D'Primera – Será Que Se Acabó; Luis Figueroa – Luis Figueroa; Luisito Ayala and La Puerto Rican Power – Y Te lo Dice...; Víctor Manuelle – Lado A Lado B	
2023	Grupo Niche & Orquesta Sinfónica Nacional de Colombia	Niche Sinfónico	Daniela Darcourt – Catarsis; Luis Figueroa – Voy a Ti; Willy García – Cambios; Plena79 Salsa Orchestra featuring Alain Pérez & Jeremy Bosch – Tierra y Libertad; Gilberto Santa Rosa – Debut y Segunda Tanda (Deluxe)	
2024	(Panama) Rubén Blades and Roberto Delgado & Orquesta	Siembra: 45° Aniversario (En Vivo en el Coliseo de Puerto Rico, 14 de Mayo 2022)	Christian Alicea – Yo Deluxe; Marc Anthony – Muevense; Ronald Borjas – Joyas Que Bailan; Luis Figueroa – Coexistencia	
2025	(Panama) Rubén Blades & Roberto Delgado & Orquesta	Fotografías	José Alberto "El Canario" – Big Swing; Issac Delgado – Mira Como Vengo; Los Hermanos Rosario – Infinito Positivo; Gilberto Santa Rosa – Debut y Segunda Tanda, Vol. II	

== Notes ==
^{^[I]} Each year is linked to the article about the Latin Grammy Awards held that year.
^{^[II]} The name of the performer and the nominated album

== See also ==
- Grammy Award for Best Salsa Album
- Grammy Award for Best Salsa/Merengue Album
