= Grupo Niche discography =

The Colombian salsa band Grupo Niche made 16 albums between 1979 and 1999. The album that reached the highest position in the Tropical Albums chart was Cielo de Tambores, which attained 3rd place in 1990.

== Studio albums ==
=== 1970s ===
List of albums, with selected details
| Title | Album details |
|---|---|
| Al Pasito | Released: 1979; Label: Daro; Format: LP |

=== 1980s ===
List of albums, with selected chart positions
| Title | Album details | Peak chart positions | | Certifications |
| Title | Album details | US Latin | US Trop | Certifications |
|---|---|---|---|---|
| Querer es Poder | Released: 1981; Label: Codiscos; Format: LP | — | — | — |
| Prepárate... | Released: 1982; Label: Codiscos; Format: LP | — | — | — |
| Directo Desde New York! (in US: Niche) | Released: 1983; Label: Codiscos; Format: LP | — | — | — |
| No Hay Quinto Malo | Released: 1984; Label: Codiscos; Format: LP, CD | — | — | *COL: Gold |
| Triunfo | Released: 1985; Label: Codiscos; Format: LP, CD | — | — | *COL: Gold |
| Me Huele a Matrimonio | Released: 1986; Label: Zeida; Format: LP, CD | — | 18 | — |
| Con Cuerdas | Released: 1986; Label: Zeida; Format: LP | — | — | — |
| Historia Musical | Released: 1987; Label: Zeida; Format: 2xLP | — | — | — |
| Tapando el Hueco | Released: 1988; Label: Codiscos; Format: LP, CD | — | 16 | *COL: Gold |
| Sutil y Contundente | Released: 1989; Label: Codiscos, Sony Music; Format: LP, CD | — | 19 | — |
"—" denotes releases that did not chart.

=== 1990s ===
List of albums, with selected chart positions
| Title | Album details | Peak chart positions | | Certifications |
| Title | Album details | US Latin | US Trop | Certifications |
|---|---|---|---|---|
| Cielo de Tambores | Released: 1990; Label: Codiscos, Sony Music; Format: LP, CD, cassette | — | 3 | — |
| Llegando al 100% | Released: 1991; Label: Codiscos; Format: LP, CD, cassette | — | 11 | — |
| Un Alto en el Camino | Released: 1993; Label: Sony Music; Format: CD, cassette | — | 10 | — |
| Huellas del Pasado | Released: 1995; Label: Sony Music; Format: CD, cassette | 43 | 9 | — |
| Etnia | Released: 1996; Label: Sony Music; Format: CD | — | 12 | — |
| A Prueba de Fuego | Released: 1997; Label: Sony Music; Format: CD | — | — | — |
| Señales de Humo | Released: 1998; Label: Sony Music; Format: CD | — | — | — |
| A Golpe de Folklore | Released: 1999; Label: Big Ear Music; Format: CD | — | — | — |
"—" denotes releases that did not chart.

=== 2000s ===
List of albums, with selected details
| Title | Album details |
|---|---|
| Propuesta | Released: 2000; Label: EMI; Format: CD |
| Control Absoluto | Released: 2002; Label: PPM; Format: CD |
| Imaginación | Released: 2004; Label: Sony Discos; Format: CD |
| Alive | Released: 2005; Label: Format: CD |

=== 2010s ===
List of albums, with selected chart positions
| Title | Album details | Peak chart positions |
| Title | Album details | US Trop |
|---|---|---|
| Tocando El Cielo Con Las Manos | Released: 2013; Label: Codiscos; Format: CD | — |
| 35 Aniversario | Released: 2015; Label: PPM; Format: LP, CD | 6 |
"—" denotes releases that did not chart.

=== 2020s ===
List of albums, with selected details
| Title | Album details |
|---|---|
| 40 | Released: 2020; Label: PPM; Format: CD |
