= Navidad a mi estilo =

2007 studio album by Víctor Manuelle

Una Navidad a Mi Estilo

Studio album by Víctor Manuelle
- Released: 6 November 2007
- Recorded: 2006–2007
- Genre: Christmas, salsa
- Label: Machete Music

Víctor Manuelle chronology
Decisión Unánime (2005)	Una Navidad a Mi Estilo (2007)	Soy (2008)

Singles from Una Navidad a Mi Estilo
- 1. "Yo Traigo la Parranda"

Una Navidad a Mi Estilo (A Christmas in My Style) is the eleventh album and first Christmas album of Puerto Rican Salsa singer Víctor Manuelle. The album was released on November 6, 2007. It produced one single, "Yo Traigo la Parranda". The album has sold 49,000 copies in the US.

== Track listing ==
1. Lechón, Lechón, Lechón - (Víctor Manuelle, Rodríguez, Ramón)
2. Yo Me Voy Para Mi Tierra - (Víctor Manuelle, Ruiz, Víctor M.)
3. Los Polvos del Sahara - (Víctor Manuelle, Ruiz, Víctor M.)
4. Amarren al Puerco - (Víctor Manuelle, Rodríguez, Ramón)
5. Navidad en Mi Barrio - (Víctor Manuelle, Ruiz, Víctor M.)
6. La Cama Cortita - (Víctor Manuelle, Betancourt, Casiano)
7. Son de Parranda - (Víctor Manuelle, Rodríguez, Ramón)
8. Yo Traigo La Parranda - (Víctor Manuelle, Ruiz, Víctor M.)

== Charts ==
Chart (2007)	Peak position
US Billboard 200	184
US Top Latin Albums (Billboard)	7
US Tropical Albums (Billboard)	2
US Top Holiday Albums (Billboard)	42

== Accolades ==
Year	Award	Result	Category	For
2008	Latin Grammy Awards	Nominated	Best Traditional Tropical Album	Navidad a Mi Estilo
