= Canciones del Alma (album) =

Canciones Del Alma

Studio album by Luis Figueroa
- Released: May 28, 2021
- Recorded: July – November 2020
- Genre: Latin pop
- Length: 37:41
- Labels: Sony Music Latin; Magnus Media LLC
- Producers: Luis Figueroa; Homero Gallardo; Jay Lugo

Luis Figueroa chronology
1807 (2021)	Canciones Del Alma (2021)	Luis Figueroa (2022)

Singles from Canciones Del Alma
- 1. "Hasta El Sol De Hoy" Released: April 7, 2021; 2. "Si Tú Me Dices Ven" Released: August 13, 2021

Canciones Del Alma is the first studio album by Puerto Rican-American singer-songwriter Luis Figueroa, released on May 28, 2021, by Sony Music Latin and Magnus Media LLC. More than a production about his musical roots, Canciones Del Alma showcases Figueroa's distinctive voice. The arrangements are influenced by pop, bolero, jazz, and acoustic music. The album also returns the singer to his tropical roots with two re-imagined salsa versions of “Hasta El Sol de Hoy” and “Si Tú Me Dices Ven”.

== Background and commercial performance ==
This album is a collection of songs that have marked his life and shaped his artistry. It includes renditions of songs by artists such as Jerry Rivera, Luis Miguel, Marc Anthony, and Jon Secada. Including bi-lingual versions of "A Puro Dolor" and "Angel", Canciones Del Alma reached No. 2 on the Billboard Latin Album Sales chart. The lead single, "Hasta El Sol de Hoy", became Figueroa's first number-one hit on the Billboard Tropical Airplay chart and reached the top ten on the Billboard Latin Pop Airplay chart, 30 years after the original version performed by his uncle, Anthony Colon. The second single, "Si Tú Me Dices Ven," reached No. 6 on the Tropical Airplay chart.

== Track listing ==
Canciones Del Alma
No.	Title	Writer(s)	Producer(s)	Length
1.	"Qué Hay De Malo"	Omar Alfanno	Luis Figueroa; Homero Gallardo	3:38
2.	"Historia de Un Amor"	Carlos E. Almarán	Luis Figueroa; Homero Gallardo	3:35
3.	"Hasta El Sol De Hoy"	Oscar Domingo Derudi	Luis Figueroa; Homero Gallardo	3:02
4.	"Si Te Vas"	Jose Martin Cuevas Cobos	Luis Figueroa; Homero Gallardo	3:22
5.	"Tú Con Él"	Eduardo Franco Da Silva	Luis Figueroa; Homero Gallardo	3:25
6.	"Ese"	Alejandro Jean; Guillermo Rafael Paz	Luis Figueroa; Homero Gallardo	3:24
7.	"Todo y Nada"	Vicente Garrido Calderón	Luis Figueroa; Homero Gallardo	3:05
8.	"A Puro Dolor"	Omar Alfanno	Luis Figueroa; Homero Gallardo	2:52
9.	"Si Tú Me Dices Ven"	Alfredo Bojalil Gil	Luis Figueroa; Homero Gallardo	3:26
10.	"Ángel"	Jon Secada; Miguel Angel Morejon; Gloria Estefan	Luis Figueroa; Homero Gallardo	3:55
11.	"Hasta El Sol de Hoy (Versión Salsa)"	Oscar Domingo Derudi	Luis Figueroa; Jay Lugo	3:57
12.	"Si Tú Me Dices Ven (Versión Salsa)"	Alfredo Bojalil Gil	Luis Figueroa; Jay Lugo	3:37
Total length:				37:41

== Charts ==
=== Hasta El Sol De Hoy ===
Chart performance for "Hasta El Sol De Hoy"
Chart (2021)	Peak position
US Tropical Airplay (Billboard)	1
Billboard Latin Pop Airplay	8
US Latin Airplay (Billboard)	26
Mediabase Tropical	1

=== Si Tú Me Dices Ven ===
Chart performance for "Si Tú Me Dices Ven"
Chart (2021)	Peak position
US Tropical Airplay (Billboard)	6
Billboard Latin Pop Airplay	16
Mediabase Tropical	1
