= Luis Figueroa (singer) =

American singer (born 1989)

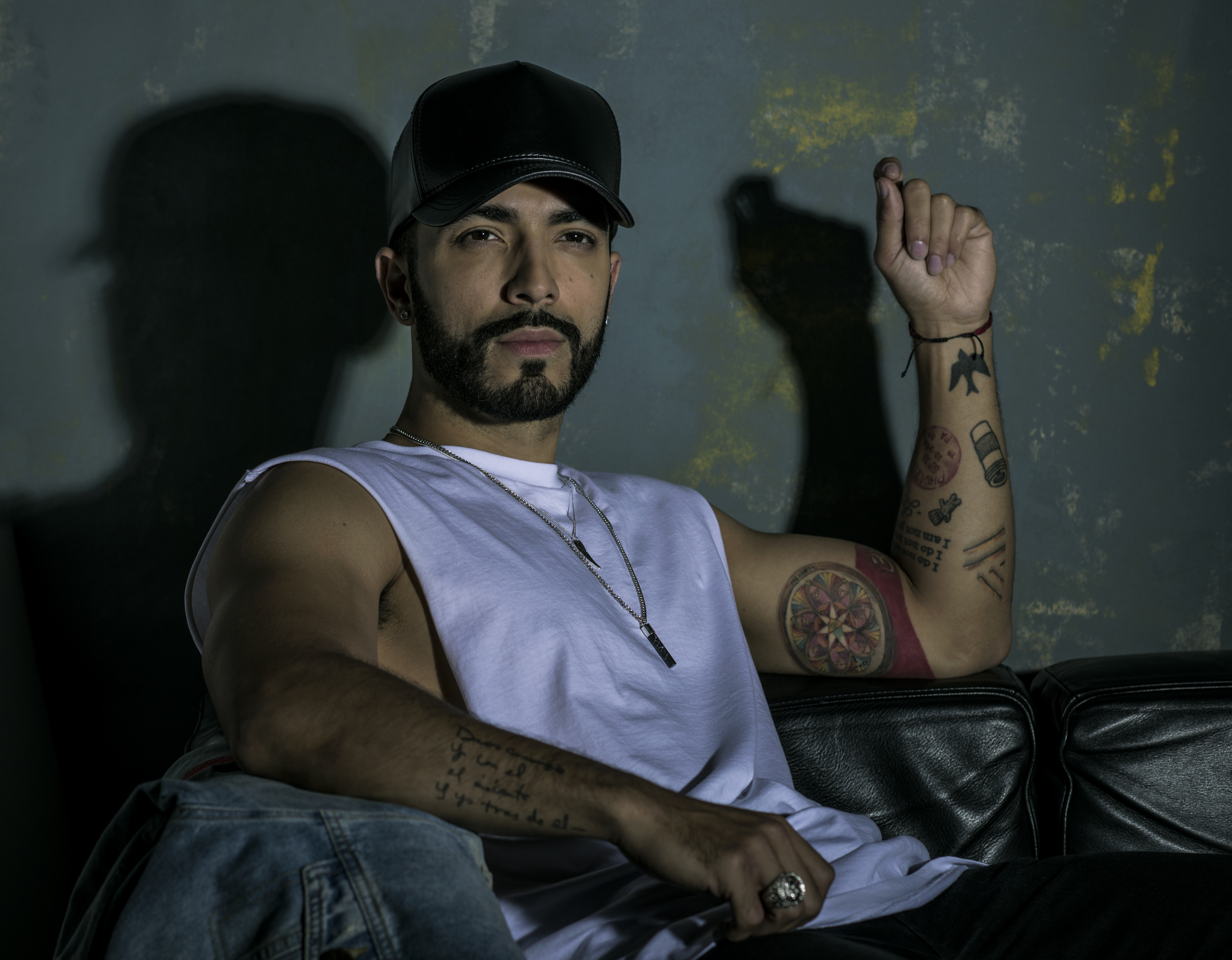
- Figueroa in 2018
- Born: September 18, 1989 (age 36); Philadelphia, Pennsylvania, U.S.
- Occupations: Singer; songwriter
- Years active: 2017–present

Luis Figueroa (born September 18, 1989) is a six-time GRAMMY-nominated American singer of the Latin pop and tropical music genres. He is known for his contributions to the salsa genre, and has been recognized as a leading voice in the movement to revitalize tropical music for new audiences. He studied at the Berklee College of Music and appeared on several television shows, including Star Search, Sábado Gigante and American Idol.

He has gained international recognition after covering songs by artists including Elijah Blake, Trey Songz, and Omarion on YouTube. His version of "Flor Pálida" caught the attention of singer Marc Anthony, which led him to sign an agreement with Magnus, the salsa star's record label.

In 2018, he accompanied Romeo Santos as a vocalist on three of his international tours, including the world tour Golden.

He received an award at Premios Juventud in 2016 for his version of "Flor Pálida", performing with Marc Anthony live on the Univisión channel.

In 2021, he was nominated for Best Pop Artist at the 2021 HTV Heat Latin Music Awards.

In 2022, Luis released his first salsa album, the self-titled Luis Figueroa. The album spawned three consecutive Top 10 hits on the Billboard Tropical Airplay chart and earned him his first Latin Grammy Award nominations for Best Salsa Album and Best Tropical Song. It solidified his status as one of the leading voices and rising stars of the salsa genre.

== Early years ==
During his upbringing, he was captivated by music based on its origins in Aibonito, Puerto Rico. He started playing the guitar, drums, piano and singing at a young age. His vocal performance led him to have early recognition in the Puerto Rican musical community, collaborating with artists such as Johnny Rivera, La India, and Domingo Quiñones.

== Musical career ==
As a teenager, he was a contestant on the talent shows Star Search, in 2003, and American Idol, in 2007.

In 2007, he began studying at the Berklee College of Music in Boston. The following year he began to upload covers of songs to YouTube . His version of Luke James's "I Want You" was seen by one of the song's co-authors, Nasri Atweh, the lead singer of the Canadian group Magic!. Atweh invited him to travel to Los Angeles and work with him on songwriting and music production.

In 2014, he uploaded his version of Flor Pálida by Marc Anthony.

In 2015, while in Málaga, Spain, he found out through Atweh that his YouTube videos had been viewed by Anthony. The following year, Luis signed with Magnus Media, Anthony's entertainment company. The night of the signing, he received an award from Premios Juventud for his cover of "Flor Pálida", which the two performed together live on Univisión television network.

He spent six months in Mexico filming the musical-themed series Guerra de ídolos. He played the fictional urban artist Diego Santillán and sang the show's theme song, “Tequila Pa’la Razón".

In 2017, he performed at the Billboard Latin Music Awards on Telemundo, which was televised internationally across Latin America. That same year he released his single "Hopeless" under the Magnus Media label. He then accompanied Romeo Santos as a vocalist on three of his international tours, including the Golden Tour in 2018.

In 2018, he collaborated with Norwegian EDM artist Matoma, on the single "Telepatía".

=== "La Especialista" and debut cover-album Canciones del Alma ===
In 2019, he released his first single with Sony Music Latin, "La Especialista", which peaked at number 27 on the Billboard Latin Pop Airplay chart and spent a total of 8 weeks on the charts.

In February 2020, he released the cumbia fused single, "Te Deseo", as an official pre-release for his debut album. The single peaked at number 24 on the Latin Pop Airplay chart and spent 11 weeks on Billboard charts.

In April 2021, he released a cover of "Hasta el Sol de Hoy". The original song was written by Oscar Domingo Derudi. A 1993 recording featured Edgar Joel along with Figueroa's uncle Anthony Colón on lead vocals. Figueroa's cover was released an acoustic version and a salsa version. It was the first single from his debut, full-length cover album Canciones del Alma which was released in May 2021. In an interview he gave to SounDarts.gr he said that "[he] wanted to take the opportunity for people to get to know [him] a little bit through songs that they are familiar with. Also, [he] wanted them to really see and hear [him] to the capacity that [he] can use [his] voice. [He] think[s], there was no better moment for this to be the first album and something that people would really get to listen to because the familiarity of the songs is what is gonna get their attention".

In addition to April 2021, Figueroa was featured on the Billboard: Latin Artist on the Rise article highlighting his accomplishments thus far. Figeuroa joined Anthony's Pa'lla Voy Tour in October, November and December that year as a special guest.

In May, he released his debut album Canciones Del Alma with 10 tracks that comprised Figueroa's "deepest memories of family, musical growth, and key songs that shaped his career". The album debuted at #2 in album sales in Puerto Rico.

Figueroa received his first number #1 on Billboard Tropical Airplay with "Hasta el Sol de Hoy" on July 27, 2021. His follow up single "Si Tu Me Dices Ven" became his second consecutive #1 when it topped the Mediabase Tropical Chart in late November.

The Canciones del Alma visual album was released on YouTube in November 2021 which included songs "Tù con Él", "Qué Hay de Malo", "Historia de Un Amor" and more following a TV special that premiered on Telemundo Puerto Rico.

=== Luis Figueroa (2022) ===
In anticipation for the release of his first salsa project of all new material, Figueroa released the lead single "Todavía Te Espero" in late March 2022. The song, written by himself and ICON, reached number 3 on Billboard Tropical Airplay, number 1 on the Mediabase Tropical chart and number 15 on Billboard Latin Airplay. Luis Figueroa was released on May 19, 2022. Billboard described the album as a “Quality product rooted in romance and hard-hitting syncopations, Luis Figueroa has not only discovered his sound but also has embraced it. Figueroa is marking his territory in the tropical genre". "Vienes" was released as the second single, following the success of "Todavía Te Espero". The song hit the Top 10 of Billboard Tropical Airplay and number 1 on the Mediabase Tropical chart. "Vienes" was also an international success reaching top 10 on the tropical charts in Panama, Ecuador, Dominican Republic, and Colombia. He performed the song live on Premios Juventud in Puerto Rico and sang in the tribute medley for El Gran Combo de Puerto Rico.

In June, Figueroa was selected by the National Puerto Rican Day Parade in New York City as a Rising Star. The same weekend he performed in the New York Salsa Festival at the Barclays Center in Brooklyn. He was nominated for Best Tropical Artist for the 2022 Heat Latin Music Awards. The Latin GRAMMY nominated song, "Fiesta Contigo" (co-written with Yoel Henriquez & Efraín “E_Flat" Gonzalez) became his third straight top 10 hit from the album on the Billboard charts. He performed the song live at the Latin GRAMMY premiere ceremony in Las Vegas and it reached number 1 on the Mediabase Tropical chart in late January 2023.

Luis Figueroa was selected by Billboard Magazine as one of "The 22 Best Latin Albums of 2022 So Far". He was also chosen by editors as a new contenders for the Latin GRAMMY. Later that year, Figueroa toured as a special guest on El Gran Combo De Puerto Rico's 60th Anniversary U.S. tour. He performed as part of Anthony's Viviendo concerts in San Juan, Puerto Rico at the Choliseo receiving "rave reviews" from press and fans. For the second year in a row he finished top 10 on the Billboard Year End Tropical Airplay Artist chart.

Figueroa ended the year by releasing the holiday song "La Clave". Described as a "tropical-urban Caribbean fusion celebrating the traditions of Christmas". The song was used in a national Christmas campaign in Puerto Rico and became his sixth straight entry on the Billboard Tropical charts.

=== Voy a Ti (2023) ===
Voy a Ti was nominated for Best Salsa Album at the 24th Latin Grammy Awards and Best Tropical Latin Album at the 66th Grammy Awards. It also received three nominations for Premio Lo Nuestro, including Tropical Album of the Year. The first single, "La Luz", became his sixth consecutive top 10 hit on the Billboard Tropical Airplay chart. His song "Bandido" topped the chart for two consecutive weeks and was the only salsa song in 2023 to reach number one on the Billboard charts. "Bandido" also held the number one position in Puerto Rico for seven consecutive weeks. The song "A Escondidas" earned him the record for the most top 10 hits in the 2020s on the Billboard Tropical charts as of March 2024. Figueroa was honored by the New York International Salsa Congress with their Lifetime Achievement Award for his contributions to the genre.

=== Coexistencia (2024) ===
His latest album Coexistencia released on May 24, 2024. Coexistencia received two Latin GRAMMY nominations for Best Salsa Album and Best Tropical Song for the single "Llorar Bonito". "Llorar Bonito" topped the Mediabase Tropical chart and reached number 3 on Billboard's Tropical Airplay chart. The album features "Nadie La Conoce" with Gente de Zona.

=== Contributions as a composer ===
As a songwriter, he has collaborated with artists such as Sebastián Yatra and Lary Over. Including on the urban pop hit "Por Perro", which has amassed more than 600 million views on YouTube and peaked at number 16 on Billboard's Latin Pop Songs chart. "Por Perro" has also been certified Quadruple Platinum by RIAA and was nominated for Video of the Year at the 2019 HTV Heat Latin Music Awards.

He wrote the Spanish version of "Cross Your Mind" for Sabrina Claudio featured on the Fifty Shades Freed (Original Motion Picture Soundtrack).

== Discography ==
=== Studio albums ===
- 1807 ( 2021)
- Canciones del Alma (2021)
- Luis Figueroa (2022)
- Voy a Ti (2023)
- Coexistencia (2024)

=== Songs ===
- "Flor Palida" (2016)
- "Hopeless" (2017)
- "Por perro" (2019)
- "La Especialista" (2019)
- "Te Deseo" (2020)
- "Noche de Paz" (2020)
- "Recuerda" (2021)
- "9PM" (2021)
- "PrimeraVez" (2021)
- "DimePorque" (2021)
- "Tírame" (2021)
- "Desigual" (2021)
- "Vuela – Remix" (2021)
- "Hasta El Sol de Hoy" (2021)
- "Si Tú Me Dices Ven" (2021)
- "Tú Con Él" (2021)
- "Qué Hay de Malo" (2021)
- "Historia de Un Amor" (2021)
- "Si Te Vas" (2021)
- "Ese" (2021)
- "Todo y Nada" (2021)
- "A Puro Dolor" (2021)
- "Ángel" (2021)
- "Todavía Te Espero" (2022)
- "Vienes" (2022)
- "9PM" (Versión Salsa) (2022)
- "Un Montón De Estrellas" (2022)
- "Fiesta Contigo" (2022)
- "La Clave" (2022)
- "Vuelve" (2023)
- "Por Tu Amor" (2023)
- "La Luz" (2023)
- "Bandido" (2023)
- "A Escondidas" (2023)
- "Todas Menos Una" (2024)
- "Medusa" (2024)
- "Esa Diabla" (2024)
- "Almas Gemelas" (2024)
- "Nadie La Conoce x GDZ" (2024)
- "Llorar Bonito" (2024)

== Awards and nominations ==
=== GRAMMY Awards ===
Year	Award	Category	Nominee	Result	Notes
2016	Premios Juventud	Best Cover Video	"Flor Pálida"	Won	
2019	Heat Latin Music Awards	Best Video	"Por Perro"	Nominated	
2021	Heat Latin Music Awards	Best Pop Artist	Figueroa	Nominated	
2022	Latin Grammy Awards	Best Tropical Song	"Fiesta Contigo"	Nominated	
2022	Latin Grammy Awards	Best Salsa Album	Luis Figueroa	Nominated	
2022	Premios Lo Nuestro	Tropical Song of the Year	"Hasta El Sol De Hoy"	Nominated	
2022	Premios Lo Nuestro	Tropical Artist of the Year	Figueroa	Nominated	
2022	Premios Juventud	Best Tropical Hit	"Hasta El Sol De Hoy"	Nominated	
2022	Heat Latin Music Awards	Best Tropical Artist	Figueroa	Nominated	
2023	Latin Grammy Awards	Best Salsa Album	Voy a Ti	Nominated	
2023	Billboard Latin Music Awards	Tropical Artist of the Year	Figueroa	Nominated	
2023	Premios Lo Nuestro	Tropical Song of the Year	"Todavía Te Espero"	Nominated	
2023	Premios Lo Nuestro	Tropical Album of the Year	Luis Figueroa	Nominated	
2023	Premios Lo Nuestro	Tropical Artist of the Year	Figueroa	Nominated	
2023	Premios Juventud	Best Tropical Hit	"Todavia Te Espero"	Nominated	
2023	Premios Juventud	Best Tropical Album	Luis Figueroa	Nominated	
2023	Latin American Music Awards	New Artist of the Year	Figueroa	Nominated	
2024	Grammy Awards	Best Tropica Latin Album	Voy a Ti	Nominated	
2024	Latin Grammy Awards	Best Tropical Song	"Llorr Bonito"	Nominated	
2024	Latin Grammy Awards	Best Salsa Album	Coexistencia	Nominated	
2024	Billboard Latin Music Awards	Tropical Song of the Year	"Bandido"	Nominated	
2024	Billboard Latin Music Awards	Tropical Artist of the Year	Figueroa	Nominated	
2024	Premios Lo Nuestro	Tropical Album of the Year	Voy a Ti	Nominated	
2024	Premios Lo Nuestro	Tropical Artist of the Year	Figueroa	Nominated	
2024	Premios Lo Nuestro	Tropical Song of the Year	"Vienes"	Nominated	
2024	Premios Juventud	Best Tropical Hit	"Bandido"	Nominated	
2024	Premios Juventud	Best Tropical Album	Voy a Ti	Nominated	
2024	Latin American Music Awards	Favorite Tropical Artist	Figueroa	Nominated	
2024	Latin American Music Awards	Favorite Tropical Song	"Bandido"	Nominated	
2024	Latin Songwriters Hall of Fame	Hero's Award (Premio Triunfador)	Figueroa	Won	
