= Teresa Martínez de Varela =

Afro-Colombian teacher (1913–1998)

- Born: Teresa de Jesús Martínez Arce; 1 July 1913; Quibdó, Chocó Department, Colombia
- Died: 16 June 1998 (aged 84); Quibdó, Chocó Department, Colombia
- Other name: Lisa de Andráfueda
- Occupations: teacher, writer
- Years active: 1932–1998

Teresa Martínez de Varela (also known under the pseudonym, Ilsa de Andágueda, 1 July 1913 – 16 June 1998) was an Afro-Colombian teacher, writer, and social leader. She was one of the first black women in Colombia to publish. Misunderstood, and often denied the ability to publish her works, the intellectual left many unpublished manuscripts at her death. For many years, she was known only as the mother of Jairo Varela, founder of Grupo Niche. Rediscovered in 2009, when Úrsula Mena de Lozano published her biography, some of her works were then collected in an anthology published by the Ministry of Culture in 2010. She is now regarded as one of the pioneering voices to bring African identity in Colombia into the literary landscape of the country and one of the primary intellectuals of her era.

== Early life ==
Teresa de Jesús Martínez Arce was born on 1 July 1913 in Quibdó, capital of the Chocó Department, in western Colombia to Ana Teresa Arce Campaña and Eladio Martínez Vélez. Her father was of Afro-Colombian heritage and worked as an engineer on boats along the Atrato River, operated a sawmill and was a musician. Her mother was of Spanish descent and encouraged Marínez to read from her father's large library from a young age. Not allowed to play with the black children in her neighborhood, she was aware of her differences, as she stood out from her schoolmates because she was mulatto. She was a voracious reader, consuming magazines and newspapers from the capital, as well as works by Jorge Luis Borges, Julio Cortázar, Simone de Beauvoir, Victor Hugo, Jean-Paul Sartre and Harriet Beecher Stowe.

Martínez attended the Presentation School in Quibdó, but was not allowed to continue her education there due to her mixed race. She moved to Cartagena to complete her secondary studies at Pius X College (Spanish: Colegio Pío), gaining a mastery in both English and French. She then attended normal school in Cartagena, before returning to Quibdó to begin researching the differences in slavery on Colombia's Atlantic and Pacific Coasts. Martínez married the merchant Pedro Varela Restrepo and the couple would have six children: Eladio Enrique, Pedro Francisco, Jairo de Fátima, Martha, Norma Gloria and Martha Lucía.

== Career ==
Martínez began her career as a teacher in 1932, at the Escuela Urbana (Urban School) in Bagadó. Discontent to be a housewife and cook, when she and her husband separated, shortly after her youngest child, Martha Lucía was born, she taught Spanish, painting and weaving at the Escuela de Artes y Oficios (School of Arts and Crafts) in Quibdó. Publishing her first novel, Guerra y amor (War and Love) in 1947, she wrote about the ravages of World War II in Europe. In 1962, Martínez took the children and moved to Bogotá, where she taught at the Colegio Femenino de Bachillerato y Comercio. After several years there, they returned to the Chocó Department where she became the director of the Normal de Istmina (Normal School of Istmina) and later served as head of the Normal de Señoritas (Women's Normal School), in Quibdó and as the Secretary of Education for the Chocó Department.

Martínez's literary output, though she had difficulty in finding publishers, was prolific. She published poems and essays assessing the cultural, historical and political issues facing Colombia, incorporated religious and romantic themes, as well as humor. Her work showed a deep understanding of the history of the country, as well as its literary and musical traditions. She published dramatic works including El nueve de Abril (April 9), a protest of the assassination in 1948 of presidential candidate Jorge Eliécer Gaitán; Las fuerzas armadas (The Armed Forces); La madre fósil (The Mother Fossil), as well as an opera, La virgen loca (The Crazy Madonna). Among her poetic works are Visiones y Vivencias de la dimensión desconocida (Hallucinations or Unknown Dimension), Ciudades de Colombia (Cities of Colombia), Fragua de Marte (Forge of Mars), Pirotecnia de la fe (Pyrotechnics of Faith), and Vivencias de una tormenta de amor (Experiences from a Storm of Love), which combine Latin American modernism with traditional African rhythms. In 1983, she published Mi Cristo negro (My Black Christ), as a commentary on the execution of Manuel Saturio Valencia. Valencia, an Afro-Colombian lawyer, "was the last person executed under the death penalty in Colombia". The book became well known to black Colombians, contributing to awareness of racism and served a catalyst for black pride to reemerge in the region.

Though Martínez believed she was misunderstood and had been largely overlooked by literary critics and editors because of her gender and race, she hoped that her work would eventually be recognized. She did receive some recognition during her lifetime, as she was included in a book Mujeres Intelectuales de América (Woman Intellecutals of America) by the Central Information Bureau of Caracas, Venezuela. She was invited by the poet Jorge Rojas, who at the time was serving as the first director of the Colombian Institute of Culture to tour the country and give recitations of her poetry. In 1993, she came to the attention of writer Úrsula Mena, who read some of Martínez's poetry, while preparing a presentation on Afro-Colombian writers. The two women struck up an acquaintance and Mena became determined to write a biography to preserve Martínez's legacy. Before she could write the book, she and Martínez's daughters, sorted and cataloged the unpublished works. They released Cantos de amor y soledad (Songs of Love and Loneliness), the most complete collection of her works, before Mena returned to writing the biography.

== Death and legacy ==
Martínez died on 16 June 1998 in Cali, Valle del Cauca. Largely forgotten except as the mother of Jairo Varela, in 2009, Úrsula Mena de Lozano published a biography of Martínez, En honor a la verdad (In Honor of the Truth), reviving interest and evaluation of the author. The following year, the Ministry of Culture included a biography of Martínez and some of her works in an anthology of Afro-Colombian poets. She is now recognized as one of the pioneer voices of Afro-Colombian writers and as one of the most important intellectuals of her era.
