= 25/7 (album) =

Studio album by Víctor Manuelle
- Released: March 23, 2018
- Studio: EMR Studio-Santa Isabel (Puerto Rico); GML Recording Studios (Miami; Kaleidoscope Sound, (Union City); Morplay Studios (Miami, FL); Rolo Studios (Puerto Rico)
- Genre: Salsa; Latin Pop
- Length: 41:27
- Language: Spanish
- Label: Sony Music Latin; Kiyavi Corp.
- Producer: David LaPointe; Víctor Manuelle

Víctor Manuelle chronology
Sonero de la Juventud... Salsero Original (2015)	25/7 (2018)	Memorias de Navidad (2019)

Singles from 25/7
- 1. "Imaginar" Released: May 2, 2016; 2. "Amarte Duro" Released: March 23, 2017; 3. "Hasta Que Me Dé La Gana" Released: June 1, 2017; 4. "Mala y Peligrosa" Released: November 2, 2017

25/7 is the seventeenth studio album by Puerto Rican singer Víctor Manuelle, released on March 23, 2018 through Kiyavi Corp. and distributed by Sony Music Latin. The album title alludes to the 25th anniversary of Manuelle's career in music. The album features guest artists such as Gilberto Santa Rosa, Farruko, Bad Bunny, and Yandel, among others.

The album featured the singles "Amarte Duro" and "Mala y Peligrosa". At the 19th Annual Latin Grammy Awards, the album won the Latin Grammy Award for Best Salsa Album.

== Commercial performance ==
The album was released in the United States on March 23, 2018. The Recording Industry Association of America (RIAA) certified 25/7 Latin gold on April 19, 2020, for shipments of 30,000 copies.

== Track listing ==
25/7 track listing
No.	Title	Writer(s)	Producer(s)	Length
1.	"Amarte Duro" (featuring Farruko)	Javier Andrés Rivera García; Irving Oscar Ramos Lasso; Carlos Efrén Reyes Rosado; Víctor M. Ruíz; Giovanni Biagio Scollo Suárez	Víctor M. Ruíz; Carlos Efrén Reyes Rosado; Jay Lugo	4:12
2.	"Nada Nos Separa"	Víctor M. Ruíz; Alfonso Sanabria López	Víctor M. Ruíz	3:52
3.	"Hasta Que Me Dé La Gana"	Víctor M. Ruíz; Wilfran Castillo	Víctor M. Ruíz; Efraín Dávila	4:19
4.	"Salsa Pa’ Olvidar Las Penas" (featuring Gilberto Santa Rosa)	Yoel Henríquez; Juan José Hernández	Víctor M. Ruíz; Marcos Sánchez	5:00
5.	"A Veces"	Gabriel A. Cruz-Wise; Víctor M. Ruíz	Víctor M. Ruíz; Efraín Dávila	3:54
6.	"Me Enteré De Tu Boda" (featuring Glenn Monroig)	Glenn Monroig	Víctor M. Ruíz; Jorge Laboy; Marcos Sánchez	4:17
7.	"Quiero Tiempo" (featuring Juan Luis Guerra)	Juan Luis Guerra; Juan Carlos Luces; Víctor M. Ruíz	Víctor M. Ruíz; Efraín Dávila	3:24
8.	"Mala y Peligrosa" (featuring Bad Bunny)	Benito Antonio Martínez Ocasio; Víctor M. Ruíz; Alfonso Sanabria	Víctor M. Ruíz; Jay Lugo	4:26
9.	"Imaginar" (featuring Yandel)	Víctor Viera Moore; Víctor M. Ruíz; Llandel Veguilla Malavé	Víctor M. Ruíz	3:15
10.	"Cuando Me Escuchen"	Víctor M. Ruíz	Víctor M. Ruíz; Tito Rivera	4:48
Total length:				41:27

== Personnel ==
Adapted from the liner notes of 25/7.

=== Performers ===
- Antonio Alonso; Drums
- Jesús Alonso; Trumpet
- Carmelo Álvarez; Bongos
- Javier Álvarez; Percussion
- Arturo Bermudez, Bass, Guitar (Bass)
- Jean Carlos Camuñas; Congas
- Eliut Cintrón; Trombone
- Ray Colón; Bongos, Cowbell
- Efraín "Junito" Davila; Arranger, Choir/Chorus, Keyboards, Piano, Producer
- Kevin De Jesús; Bass
- Tito de García; Timbales
- Tito de Gracia; Timbales
- Jorge Diaz; Trombone
- Savier Diaz; Bongos
- Wimdi Diaz; Choir/Chorus
- Jan Duclerc; Trumpet
- Carlos García; Piano
- Sammy García; Congas
- Guianko Gómez; Choir/Chorus, Engineer
- Juan José Hernández; Composer, Guitar (Acoustic), Lyricist
- Jorge Laboy; Arranger, Guitar (Acoustic), Musical Producer
- Jay Lugo; Arranger, Keyboards, Producer, Programming
- Ángel Machado; Trumpet
- Angie Machado; Trumpet
- Víctor Manuelle; Choir/Chorus, Mixing Engineer, Primary Artist, Vocals, Composer, Lyricist
- Pedro Marcano; Trumpet
- Luis Marín; Piano
- Ismael Miranda; Choir/Chorus
- Juan L. Picorelli; Bongos, Congas
- José Cheito Quiñones; Choir/Chorus
- Luisito Quintero; Congas, Percussion, Timbales
- Ricardo Rodríguez; Guitar (Electric)
- Rubén Rodríguez; Bass
- Max Rosado; Choir/Chorus
- Raúl Rosario; Timbales
- José Ruiz; Trumpet
- Joseito Ruiz; Trumpet
- Marcos Sánchez; Engineer, Keyboards, Mixing Engineer, Musical Producer, Organ, Piano, Producer
- Gilberto Santa Rosa; Choir/Chorus, Featured Artist
- Charlie Sierra; Timbales
- Ángel Torres; Sax (Baritone)
- Jesús R. Torres; Trombone
- Antonio Vázquez; Trombone
- Juan Vélez; Choir/Chorus
- Sammy Vélez; Sax (Baritone)
- Dan Warner; Guitar

== Charts ==
=== Weekly charts ===
Chart (2018)	Peak position
US Top Latin Albums (Billboard)	2
US Tropical Albums (Billboard)	1

=== Year-end charts ===
Chart (2018)	Position
US Top Latin Albums (Billboard)	72
US Tropical Albums (Billboard)	13

== Certifications ==
Region	Certification	Certified units/sales
United States (RIAA)	Gold (Latin)	30,000^{‡}
^{‡} Sales+streaming figures based on certification alone.
