= 35 Aniversario =

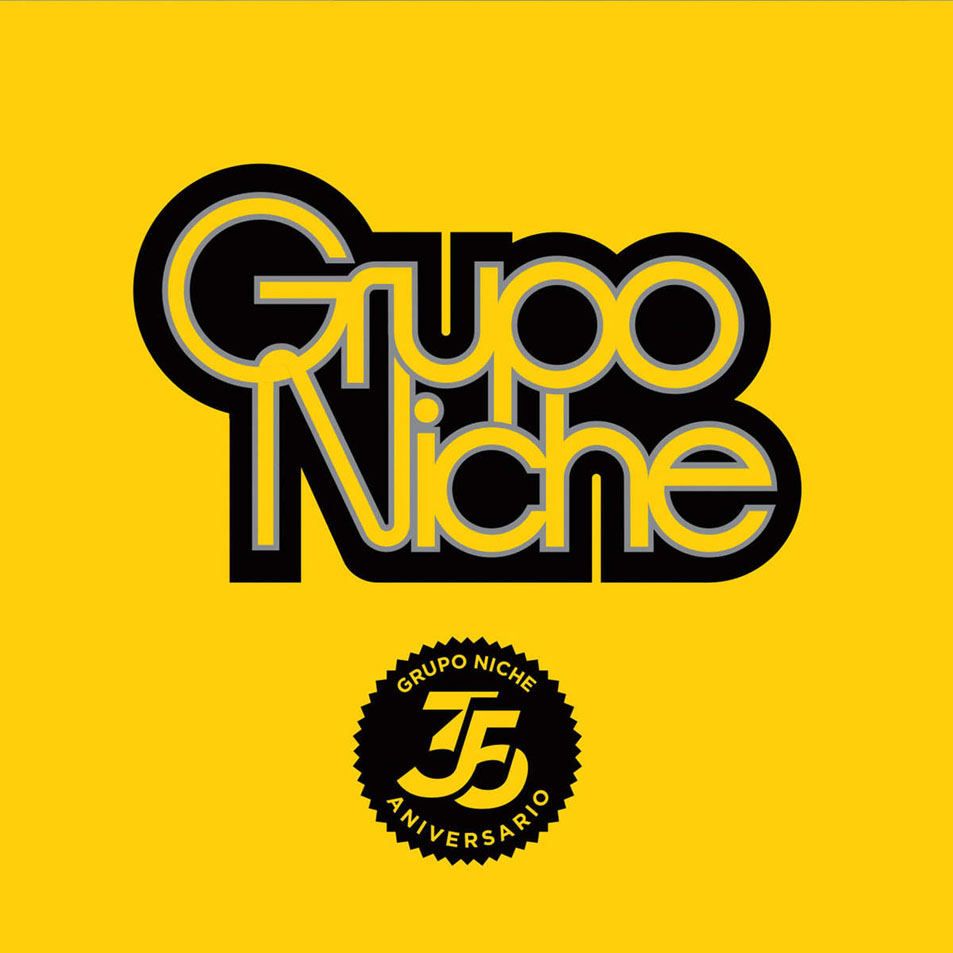

Studio album by Grupo Niche
- Released: October 2, 2015
- Recorded: 2014–2015
- Studio: Niche Estudios Profesionales
- Genre: Salsa
- Length: 46:55
- Label: PPM Records
- Producer: José Aguirre

Grupo Niche chronology
Tocando el cielo con las manos (2013)	35 Aniversario (2015)	40 (2020)

35 Aniversario (English: 35 Anniversary) is a studio album by Colombian salsa group Grupo Niche, released on October 2, 2015, through PPM Records. It was produced by José Aguirre, musical director of the group and marks their thirty-five years of career. The album is their second album after the death of Jairo Varela, one of the founders of the group and its main director.

At the 17th Annual Latin Grammy Awards, the album was nominated for Best Salsa Album, while at the 59th Annual Grammy Awards, it was nominated for Best Tropical Latin Album, being the group's first Grammy Award nomination. It was also nominated for Tropical Album of the Year at the Premio Lo Nuestro 2017.

== Background ==
On September 21, 2015, the group announced the date release of the album via their Twitter account, sharing a picture of the front and back cover of the album as well as the track list. 35 Aniversario is the group's second release after the death of Jairo Varela on August 8, 2012, from a heart attack, the first one being Tocando el cielo con las manos (2013), Varela was one of the two founders of the group alongside Alexis Lozano, who later left the group, Varela served as the director of the group and wrote most of its songs. The album was produced by José Aguirre who took over as the musical director of the group in August 2015, replacing Richie Valdés.

The album is composed of eleven tracks, all of them being old songs written by Varela with the exception of the last track "Herederos de un Legado", composed by Aguirre. About the album, the group said "this new album proposes to rescue old recordings made by Grupo Niche that, due to the great diffusion of other hits of the group, did not have the opportunity to be on mass radio, but that have the quality and seal of its composer, the master Jairo Varela". To promote the release of the album, the group made a series of concerts in various cities of United States including New Orleans and New York, and later in Peru, Colombia and Dominican Republic.

== Commercial performance ==
The album peaked at number six at the Tropical Albums chart, being the group's highest appearance in the chart since their 1990 album Cielo de Tambores, which peaked at the third position and it their highest-ranking album in the list overall. Three songs from the album charted at the Tropical Airplay chart in the United States, all peaking in three in different years, "Te Enseñaré a Olvidar" at number two in 2015, "Enamorada" at number nine in 2016 and "El Coco" at number twenty-five in 2017, "Te Enseñaré a Olvidar" became their highest appearance in the chart surpassing their 2004 song "Culebra" which peaked at number three.

== Track listing ==
All tracks were written by Jairo Varela expect when noted; and produced by Aguirre.

35 Aniversario track listing
No.	Title	Writer(s)	Performer(s)	Length
1.	"Niche Como Yo"		Elvis Magno	4:13
2.	"Enamorada"		Yuri Toro	4:16
3.	"Cicatrices"		Elvis Magno	4:31
4.	"El Coco"		Yuri Toro	4:00
5.	"Te Enseñaré a Olvidar"		Elvis Magno	4:33
6.	"Mi Negrita y la Calentura"		Elvis Magno	4:28
7.	"Primer Mensaje"		Elvis Magno; Yuri Toro	4:13
8.	"Primero y Qué"		Yuri Toro	4:02
9.	"Señales de Humo"		Elvis Magno	3:48
10.	"El Que Regala y Quita"		Arnold Moreno	4:07
11.	"Herederos de un Legado"	José Aguirre	Elvis Magno; Yuri Toro; Arnold Moreno	4:40
Total length:				46:55

== Credits ==
=== Musicians ===
- Elvis W. Angulo – lead vocals
- Yuri Toro – lead vocals
- Arnold Moreno – lead vocals
- Ramon Benitez – trombone
- Edgardo Manuel – trombone
- Oswaldo Salazar – trumpet
- Carlos Zapata – trumpet
- Javier Bahamon – trumpet
- Diego Camacho – timbales
- Fabio Celorio – bongos, campana
- Juan M. Murillo "Juanito" – congas
- Francisco Ocoro "Pacho" – baby bass
- Luis Carlos Ochoa – piano

=== Technical ===
- José Aguirre – production, arrangements
- Ricardo Bicenty Jr. – recording engineer
- Freddy Martinez – recording engineer
- Juan Miguel Varela – road manager
- Romel Caycedo – booking & promotion manager
- Yanila Varela – general manager

== Charts ==
Weekly chart performance for 35 Aniversario
Chart (2015)	Peak position
US Tropical Albums (Billboard)	6
