= Havana D'Primera =

Cuban Timba band

- Origin: Havana, Cuba
- Genres: Cuban salsa; Timba
- Years active: 2008–present
- Label: Páfata Productions
- Website: havanadprimera.com

Havana D'Primera is a Cuban Timba band founded by Alexander Abreu on October 4, 2007, the date on which they performed their first live performance, at the Cabaret Turquino of the Hotel Habana Libre in Havana. The band is made up of a collective of high-level musicians in the Cuban music scene with a total of 16 members.

Since their inception they have gone on to find international success, and even performed for Beyonce and Jay-Z when the couple visited Havana in 2013.

The first album Haciendo Historia won the award for "Best Debut Album" at the 2010 Cubadisco gala. The first release for the record label Páfata Productions, Pasaporte, received favorable reviews from the international press and was voted one of the best Latin albums of the year by listeners of NPR. It was named by Los Angeles Times as one of the 10 Best Latin Music Albums of The time. In addition, it was awarded the award for "Best Popular Dance Music Album" at the 2013 Cubadisco Awards and won the award for "Best Choreographic Video" at the Lucas Awards 2012 with the video for the song Al Final de la Vida.

La Vuelta al Mundo won the awards for "Best Popular Dance Music Album" and "Grand Prize" at Cubadisco 2015, as well as "Best Popular Dance Music Video" at the Lucas Awards 2016 for the music video of the song Around the World. Likewise, the video for the song Me Dicen Cuba won a "Special Award" at the Lucas gala. Cantor del Pueblo won the award for "Best Popular Dance Music Video" at the Lucas Awards 2019 and also secured a nomination for "Best Salsa Album" at the Latin Grammy Awards 2018. The single Quiero Verte Otra Vez won the Special Prize at the Lucas Awards gala in 2020 and was also classified by the French newspaper “Le Monde” as one of the favorite songs of Latin music.

Pueblo Griffo was released on 6 September 2023 by Páfata Productions. Named after the neighborhood of Cienfuegos where Abreu was born, it has twelve tracks, including "CU-PR" with Puerto Rican singer Gilberto Santa Rosa. At the 2024 Cubadisco Awards it won in the categories Música Bailable Actual (current dance music) and Diseño de Sonido Controlado (controlled sound design).

== Discography ==
Since its founding, the band has released six studio albums and one live album.

Albums
| Title | Modality | Typography | Release date | Label |
|---|---|---|---|---|
| Haciendo Historia | CD | Studio álbum | 2009 | EGREM |
| Pasaporte | CD | Studio álbum | 2013 | Páfata |
| La Vuelta al Mundo | CD | Studio album | 2015 | Páfata |
| Haciendo Historia LIVE | CD/DVD | Live album | 2016 | Unicornio |
| Cantor del Pueblo | CD | Studio álbum | 2018 | Páfata |
| Será Que Se Acabó | CD | Studio álbum | 2021 | Páfata & Unicornio |
| Pueblo Griffo | CD | Studio album | 2023 | Páfata |

Singles
| Title | Release date | Label |
|---|---|---|
| Me Dicen Cuba / Rosa La Peligrosa | 2013 | Páfata |
| Trece (Remix) | 2015 | Páfata |
| Entre lo Bueno y lo Malo | 2018 | Páfata |
| Energías Oscuras (Bachata) | 2020 | Páfata |
| Quiero Verte Otra Vez | 2020 | Páfata |
| Raza | 2020 | Páfata & EGREM |
| Raza Remix | 2020 | Páfata & EGREM |
| Aventura Loca | 2020 | Páfata & Unicornio |
| Más Rollo Que Película | 2020 | Páfata & Unicornio |
| Azowano | 2021 | Páfata |
| CU-PR (with Gilberto Santa Rosa) | 2023 | Páfata |
| La Carta | 2024 | Páfata |
| La Bandera | 2024 | Páfata |
| La Carta (with Paulo FG) | 2025 | Páfata |
| Fantasía | 2026 | Páfata |
