= Cielo de Tambores =

Studio album by Grupo Niche
- Released: December 20, 1990
- Recorded: 1990
- Genre: Salsa
- Length: 42:10
- Label: Sony Music Latin
- Producer: Jairo Varela

Grupo Niche chronology
Sutil Y Contundente (1989)	Cielo de Tambores (1990)	Llegando Al 100% (1991)

Professional ratings
Review scores
Source	Rating
Allmusic	4.5/5 stars
The Encyclopedia of Popular Music	3/5 stars

Cielo De Tambores (English: Heaven of Drums) is the twelfth album by Colombian salsa band Grupo Niche, released on December 20, 1990. The album became the most successful record production of the group, driven by compositions that achieved wide airplay in their country and in the rest of Latin America such as Una Aventura, Cali Ají, Busca Por Dentro and Sin Sentimiento. The same year of its release, it ranked third on Billboard magazine's tropical music chart in the United States. In 2015, it was selected by Billboard magazine as one of the "50 Essential Latin Albums of the Last 50 Years".

== Recordings and Composition ==
With the acquisition of his own recording studio, producer Jairo Varela began to be more of a perfectionist, and on several days recorded until 8 a.m.

=== Cali Ají ===
One of the hardest songs to record, since Varela didn't like any of the choruses that were recorded, so he repeated them over and over again. In the early hours of the morning, one of the musicians asked the studio guard to buy pandebono and oatmeal. In the middle of the recess conversation, Jairo exclaimed "I was getting hungry... it's a question of pandebono", which served as inspiration for the chorus of the song.

== Track listing ==
Credits adapted from the liner notes of Cielo de Tambores.

No.	Title	Writer(s)	Length
1.	"Cielo de Tambores"	Jairo Varela, Andrés Viáfara	5:41
2.	"Una Aventura"	Jairo Varela, Andrés Viáfara	5:30
3.	"Se Pareció Tanto a Ti"	Jairo Varela, Sergio George	5:30
4.	"Doña Pastora"	Jairo Varela, Andrés Viáfara	4:56
5.	"Busca Por Dentro"	Jairo Varela, Andrés Viáfara	5:57
6.	"Debiera Olvidarla"	Jairo Varela, Andrés Viáfara	4:25
7.	"Sin Sentimiento"	Jairo Varela, Sergio George	4:57
8.	"Cali Ají"	Jairo Varela, Andrés Viáfara	4:36

== Personnel ==
- Bass: Raúl Umaña, Johnny Torres (special collaboration)
- Bongo: Iván Sierra
- Singers: Charlie Cardona, Javier Vásquez, Ricardo "Richie" Valdés
- Congas: Dennys Ibarguen
- Vocals: Ricardo "Richie" Valdés, Charlie Cardona, Javier Vásquez, Raúl Umaña, Jairo Varela, Diana Serna (on "Una Aventura")
- Maracas: Diego Galé (special collaboration)
- Piano: Álvaro "Pelusa" Cabarcas
- Keyboard: Ricardo "Richie" Valdés
- Timpani: William Valdés
- Trombone 1: César Monges
- Trombone 2: Gonzalo Palacio
- Trombone 3: Andrés Viáfara
- Trumpet 1: Danny Jiménez
- Trumpet 2: Oswaldo Ospino

=== Producers ===
- Arrangements and direction in studio: Jairo Varela, Andrés Viáfara
- Arrangements: Sergio George (special collaboration on "Sin Sentimiento" and "Se Pareció Tanto a Ti")

== Charts ==
Chart (1990)	Peak position
U.S. Tropical Albums (Billboard)	3

=== Sales ===
Region	Certification	Certified units/sales
Colombia	—	50,000
