= Maite Hontelé =

Dutch trumpeter

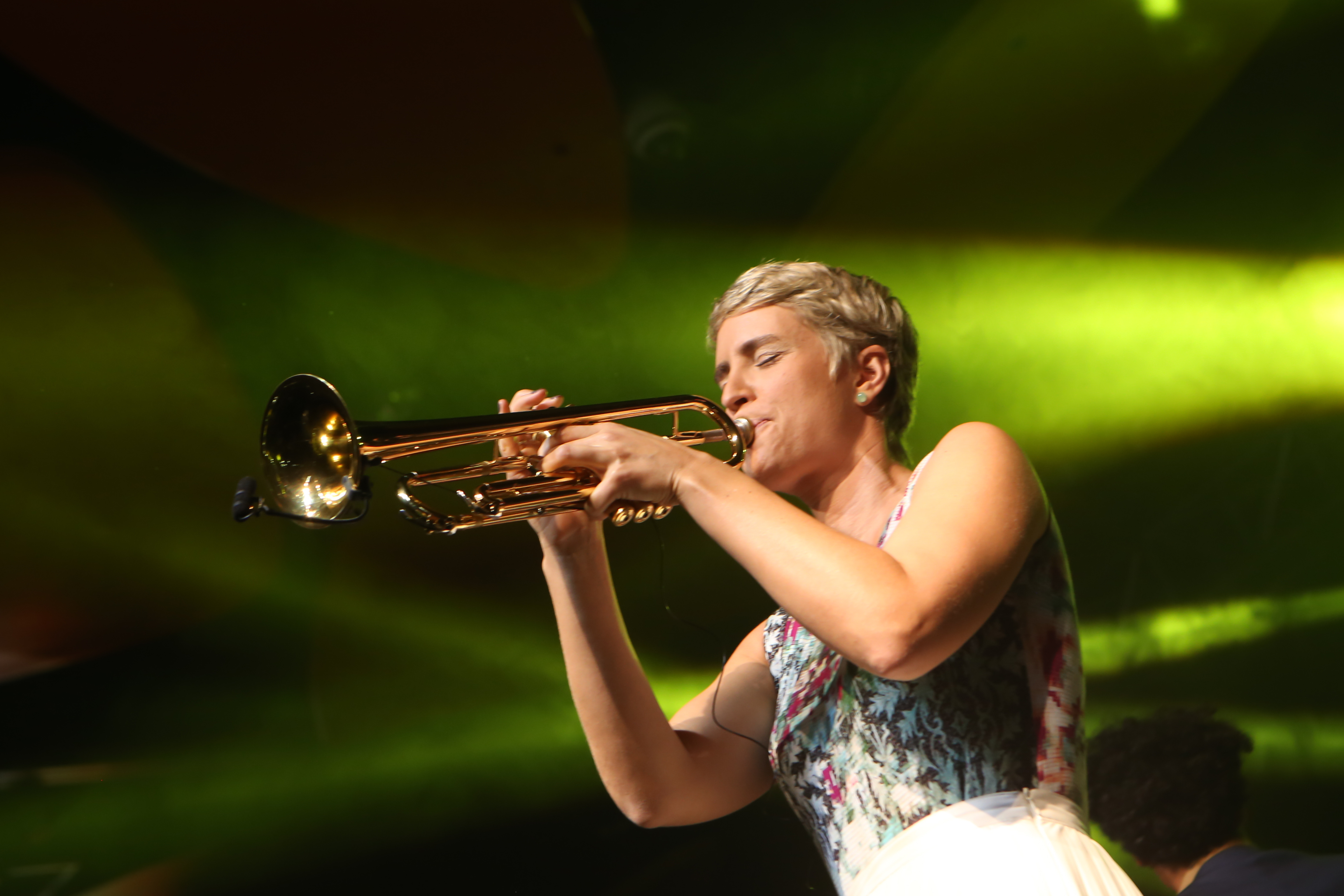
- Hontelé performing at the Medellín Salsa Fest, Colombia in 2015

Background information
- Born: January 9, 1980 (age 46); Utrecht, Netherlands
- Origin: Haaften
- Genres: Salsa; son cubano; cha cha chá; bolero
- Occupation: Trumpeter
- Years active: 2000–2019

Maite Hontelé is a Dutch trumpeter specializing in Latin and jazz trumpet.

== Early life and education ==
Maite Hontelé was born in Utrecht, Netherlands. She is the granddaughter of musician, composer and author, André Hontelé.

Around the age of 9, Hontelé learned to play the trumpet in the harmony orchestra of the village Haaften. After attending secondary school in Gorinchem, she studied at the Rotterdam Conservatory of Music.

== Career ==
From about 1995 onwards, Hontelé played in various salsa bands. In 2008, she performed in Colombia with the Cubop City Big Band during the jazz festival of Medellín; afterwards she decided to move to Colombia. Hontelé lived there for over a decade and formed her own band; between 2010 and 2013 she toured Europe with Dutch musicians.

Hontelé cooperated with other artists, such as in 2013 with the Panamese singer-activist Rubén Blades a tour through a number of countries such as France, Suriname and India. In 2013 she performed together with the rapper Typhoon on the Oerol Festival.

In 2014, Hontelé toured the Netherlands for the first time with her renewed Colombian band. Her album Déjame Asi – with as guests singer Oscar D'Léon and the duo Ten Sharp – was nominated for a Latin Grammy Award.

After the album Te Voy A Querer in 2016 a coöperation followed with the Venezuelan jazztrumpettiste/singer Linda Briceño.

At the end of 2018 the album Cuba Linda was issued including guest-appearances by singer Gilberto Santa Rosa and Orquesta Aragon. This album too was nominated for a Latin Grammy.

In 2019, Hontelé took a break from her career as an interpreter and returned to the Netherlands where she worked on television as a presenter of the NTR program Podium op Pad. She also became artistic director of the Music Meeting Festival and, in 2023 and 2024, of the Nationaal Jeugd Jazz Orkest.

== Albums ==
- 2009 – Llegó La Mona
- 2010 – Mujer Sonora
- 2013 – Déjame Así
- 2015 – Te Voy A Querer
- 2018 – Cuba Linda
