= Voy a Ti =

Voy A Ti

Studio album by Luis Figueroa
- Released: May 18, 2023
- Recorded: 2022
- Genre: Tropical music; salsa music
- Length: 16:34
- Label: Sony Music Latin; Magnus Media LLC
- Producer: Arbise “Motiff” Gonzalez; Luis Figueroa

Luis Figueroa chronology
Luis Figueroa (2022)	Voy A Ti (2023)	Coexistencia (2024)

Singles from Voy A Ti
- 1. "La Luz" Released: March 16, 2023; 2. "Bandido" Released: August 17, 2023; 3. "A Escondidas"

Voy A Ti is the third studio album by Luis Figueroa. It was released on May 18, 2023, through Sony Music Latin. Following the success of his previous self-titled album, this record continues to modernize the salsa genre by integrating urban components, bringing a fresh sound to the music. The album was nominated for Best Tropical Latin Album at the 66th Grammy Awards and Best Salsa Album at the 24th Latin Grammy Awards. It also received three nominations at the 2024 Premio Lo Nuestro, including Tropical Album of the Year.

== Background and Commercial performance ==
Voy A Ti is considered a pivotal album for Luis Figueroa, showcasing his ability to innovate salsa music while staying true to the genre's roots. Produced by Arbise “Motiff” Gonzalez and Luis Figueroa, the album blends traditional salsa rhythms with urban influences, offering a contemporary take on the tropical genre. The album's success is reflected in its chart performance and nominations at prestigious music awards.

The album's hit single, "Bandido" topped the Billboard Tropical Airplay chart for two consecutive weeks, making it the only salsa song in 2023 to achieve that feat. The song also reached #1 in Puerto Rico, staying at the top for seven weeks. When the song "A Escondidas" reached the top 10 of the Billboard Tropical charts in early 2024, it earned him the distinction as the newest artist to place the most top 10 hits this decade on the Billboard Tropical charts.

== Track listing ==
Voy A Ti
No.	Title	Writer(s)	Producer(s)	Length
1.	"Vuelve"	Luis Figueroa; Manuel Lara	Arbise "Motiff" Gonzalez; Luis Figueroa	3:15
2.	"Por Tu Amor"	Luis Figueroa; Manuel Lara	Arbise "Motiff" Gonzalez; Luis Figueroa	3:10
3.	"A Escondidas"	Luis Figueroa; Albaro Lennier Mesa	Arbise "Motiff" Gonzalez; Luis Figueroa	3:39
4.	"La Luz"	Luis Figueroa; Laureano Pardo Toconac; Mateo Javier Gil Ferdinand	Arbise "Motiff" Gonzalez; Luis Figueroa	3:05
5.	"Bandido"	Luis Figueroa; Edgar Barrera; Angel Arce; Maria Cristina Chiluiza; Philip Kembo; Arbise "Motiff" Gonzalez	Arbise "Motiff" Gonzalez; Luis Figueroa	3:25
Total length:				16:34

== Charts and certifications ==
=== La Luz ===
Chart performance for "La Luz"
Chart (2023)	Peak position
US Tropical Airplay (Billboard)	7
US Latin Airplay (Billboard)	23
Mediabase Tropical	1

=== Bandido ===
Chart performance for "Bandido"
Chart (2023)	Peak position
US Tropical Airplay (Billboard)	1
US Latin Airplay (Billboard)	18
Mediabase Tropical	1

=== A Escondidas ===
Chart performance for "A Escondidas"
Chart (2023)	Peak position
US Tropical Airplay (Billboard)	7
