= Soy (Víctor Manuelle album) =

Studio album by Víctor Manuelle
- Released: June 10, 2008
- Recorded: 2007
- Genre: Latin Pop, Salsa
- Label: Kiyavi Records

Víctor Manuelle chronology
| Navidad a Mi Estilo (2007) | Soy (2008) | Yo Mismo (2009) |

Singles from Soy
- 1. "No Soy Quien"; 2. "Yo No Se Perdonarte"

Soy (I Am) is the twelfth album of Puerto Rican Salsa singer Víctor Manuelle. The album was released on June 10, 2008. It produced two singles, "Yo No Se Perdonarte" and "No Soy Quien".

== Track listings ==
1. Yo Te Quería Querer
2. Yo No Sé Perdonarte (Salsa)
3. Dime (Salsa)
4. El Amor Es Un Casino (ft. Tego Calderón)
5. No Soy Quién (Salsa)
6. Mi Salsa
7. No Me Niegues la Vida
8. Mi Mejor Amiga
9. No Soy Quién (Ballad)
10. Dime (Ballad)
11. Yo No Sé Perdonarte (Ballad)

== Singles ==
1. "Yo No Se Perdonarte"
2. "No Soy Quien"

== Charts ==
Chart performance for Soy
| Chart (2008) | Peak position |
|---|---|
| US Billboard 200 | 159 |
| US Top Latin Albums (Billboard) | 9 |
| US Tropical Albums (Billboard) | 1 |

== Awards/Nominations ==
| Year | Award | Result | Category |
|---|---|---|---|
| 2008 | Latin Grammy Awards | Nominated | Best Salsa Album |

== See also ==
- List of number-one Billboard Tropical Albums from the 2000s
