= Luis Figueroa (album) =

Studio album by Luis Figueroa
- Released: May 19, 2022
- Recorded: 2021 – 2022
- Genre: Tropical music; salsa music
- Length: 16:08
- Label: Sony Music Latin; Magnus Media LLC
- Producer: Arbise “Motiff” Gonzalez; Luis Figueroa

Luis Figueroa chronology
Canciones Del Alma (2021)	Luis Figueroa (2022)	Voy a Ti (2023)

Singles from Luis Figueroa
- 1. "Todavía Te Espero" Released: March 24, 2022; 2. "Vienes" Released: May 17, 2022; 3. "Fiesta Contigo" Released: May 19, 2022

Luis Figueroa is the second studio album by Luis Figueroa. It was released on May 19, 2022, through Sony Music Latin. The album is the first studio Salsa album of Figueroa composed entirely of newly written and recorded songs.

The album produced three top 10 hit singles on the Billboard Tropical Airplay chart. Additionally, it received two nominations at the 23th Latin Grammy Awards, one for "Best Salsa Album" and another for "Best Tropical Song" for the single "Fiesta Contigo".

== Background and commercial performance ==
The collection of songs represents the different phases of falling in love, while highlighting Luis's dynamic vocals.

Composed by Figueroa and produced alongside "Motiff" Gonzalez, the album amassed over 18 million streams worldwide and was selected by Billboard as one of “The 22 Best Latin Albums of 2022”.

== Track listing ==
Luis Figueroa
No.	Title	Writer(s)	Producer(s)	Length
1.	"Todavía Te Espero"	Luis Figueroa; Andres David Restrepo Echavarria; Johan Espinosa Cuervo; Estefan Higuita Estrada; Salomón Villada Hoyos; Arbise “Motiff” Gonzalez	Arbise "Motiff" Gonzalez; Luis Figueroa	3:12
2.	"Fiesta Contigo"	Luis Figueroa; Yoel Henríquez; Efraín “E_Flat” Gonzalez	Arbise "Motiff" Gonzalez; Luis Figueroa	3:20
3.	"Un Montón de Estrellas"	Fernando Borrego Linares	Arbise "Motiff" Gonzalez; Luis Figueroa	3:28
4.	"Vienes"	Luis Figueroa; Efraín “E_Flat” Gonzalez; Antonio Cortes Moreno; Arbise “Motiff” Gonzalez	Arbise “Motiff” Gonzalez; LuisFigueroa	3:00
5.	"9PM"	Luis Figueroa; Cesar Augusto “Fux Beat” Santiago Cajigas; Jose Ignacio Ordenez Muino	Arbise "Motiff" Gonzalez; Luis Figueroa	3:08
Total length:				16:08

== Charts ==
=== Todavía te espero ===
Chart performance for "Todavía te espero"
Chart (2022)	Peak position
US Tropical Airplay (Billboard)	3
US Latin Airplay (Billboard)	15
US Mediabase Tropical	1

=== Vienes ===
Chart performance for "Vienes"
Chart (2022)	Peak position
US Tropical Airplay (Billboard)	7
US Latin Airplay (Billboard)	35
Mediabase Tropical	1

=== Fiesta Contigo ===
Chart performance for "Fiesta Contigo"
Chart (2022)	Peak position
US Tropical Airplay (Billboard)	4
US Latin Airplay (Billboard)	22
Mediabase Tropical	1
