= Charlie Cardona =

Colombian singer

Charlie Cardona (born July 8, 1967) is a Colombian singer. In 1990, he became the lead singer of the musical ensemble Grupo Niche and at the 11th Lo Nuestro Awards he was nominated for Tropical New Artist of the Year.
