= 40 (Grupo Niche album) =

Studio album by Grupo Niche
- Released: May 29, 2020
- Recorded: 2019–2020
- Studio: Niche Estudios Profesionales
- Genre: Salsa
- Length: 39:24
- Label: PPM Records
- Producer: José Aguirre

Grupo Niche chronology
35 Aniversario (2015)	40 (2020)

Singles from 40
- 1. "Cosas Bonitas" Released: June 7, 2019; 2. "Soltero" Released: September 20, 2019; 3. "Cuarenta Ruedas" Released: February 21, 2020; 4. "Búscame" Released: May 8, 2020; 5. "Algo Que Se Quede" Released: September 18, 2020; 6. "Canciones Viejas" Released: December 25, 2020

40 is the twenty-eighth studio album by Colombian salsa group Grupo Niche, released on May 29, 2020, through PPM Records. The album was produced by José Aguirre and marks the group's forty years of career. It is the group's first album composed of tracks not written by Jairo Varela, who was their co-founder and director until his death in 2012.

The album gave the group their first Latin Grammy and Grammy wins, at the 21st Annual Latin Grammy Awards it won Best Salsa Album, being their third nomination in the category, while at the 63rd Annual Grammy Awards it won Best Tropical Latin Album, making them the first Colombian salsa band to win a Grammy Award.

== Background ==
The recording of the album took place during the COVID-19 pandemic and spanned through three different countries, according to Álex Torres, one of the main vocalists of the group, "the recording was quite expensive, it took us two more years, we recorded on tape, looking for that more natural, analog sound, the percussion and harmony were recorded in Puerto Rico, the metals, in a studio in Miami, and the voices, in Cali". It features musicians Alfredo de la Fé, Hugo Candelario and Epifanio Bazán as guest artists, as well as Adriana Chamorro and Diana Serna, who provide backing vocals in "Búscame". The main vocals are performed by Álex Torres, Luis Araque and Alejandro Íñigo, replacing Elvis Magno, Yuri Toro and Arnold Moreno, who worked in the previous album and left the group after its release.

The album is composed entirely by songs written by José Aguirre, unlike their previous efforts which were mostly composed by Jairo Varela, Aguirre said that "with this album we are giving the world the opportunity to continue enjoying a band that is the cultural heritage of Latin music, with an interesting mix of experienced musicians and a new generation that work in synergy, from all the fundamentals and parameters created by the great master Jairo Varela". The songs deal with themes of love and history, like in "Cosas Bonitas" ("Beautiful Things"), about first meeting a person and being in love with them, "Búscame" ("Look for Me"), about a heartfelt conversation between a father and a son, and "Cuarenta Ruedas" ("Forty Wheels"), which tells the experiences of the group throughout their forty-year career.

== Singles ==
The album spawned six singles, two of them released during 2019; "Cosas Bonitas" on June 7 and "Soltero" on September 20, and the other four released throughout 2020; "Cuarenta Ruedas" on February 21, "Búscame" on May 8, "Algo Que Se Quede" on September 18 and "Canciones Viejas" on December 25. Despite the album not charting at the Tropical Albums chart, the first two singles managed to appear at the Tropical Airplay chart, "Cosas Bonitas" peaking at number 19 and "Soltero" at 21. Additionally, the single "Algo Que Se Quede" found moderate success peaking at number 14 in Colombia and achieving over 10 million streams in Spotify after few months of its release, its music video, directed by Andrés Baeza and filmed at Industria Creativa Colombiana Studios, has over 110 million views in YouTube as of 2022, being one of their most viewed videos in the platform.

== Track listing ==
All tracks were written and produced by Aguirre.

40 track listing
No.	Title	Performer(s)	Length
1.	"Soltero"	Luis Arnaque	4:19
2.	"Búscame"	Alejandro Iñigo	4:17
3.	"Cuarenta Ruedas"	Álex Torres	4:15
4.	"Canciones Viejas"	Álex Torres	4:20
5.	"Mis Panas"	Álex Torres	4:59
6.	"Algo Que Se Quede"	Luis Arnaque	3:40
7.	"Happy Viche"	Álex Torres; Luis Araque; Alejandro Iñigo	4:57
8.	"Vivencias"	Alejandro Iñigo	4:19
9.	"Cosas Bonitas"	Alejandro Iñigo	4:13
Total length:			39:24

== Credits ==
=== Musicians ===
- Álex Torres – lead vocals, backing vocals
- Luis Araque – lead vocals, backing vocals
- Alejandro Íñigo – lead vocals, backing vocals
- Juanito Murillo – congas
- Diego Camacho – timbales, cajón
- Fabio Celorio – bongó
- Héctor "Pichie" Pérez – percussion
- Víctor González – piano
- Jhonny Torres – bass
- Sergio Múnera – bass
- José Aguirre – keyboards, guitar, trumpets
- Carlos Zapata – trumpets
- Oswaldo Ospino – trumpets
- Alex Zapata – trombone
- Paul Gordillo – tenor saxophone
- Wichy Camacho – backing vocals

=== Technical ===
- José Aguirre – production, arrangements
- Rony Torres – recording engineer
- Yanila Varela – executive producer

=== Guest musicians ===
- Adriana Chamorro – backing vocals (track 2)
- Diana Serna – backing vocals (track 2)
- Alfredo de la Fé – violin (track 5)
- Hugo Candelario – marimba (track 7)
- Epifanio Bazán – bombo, guasá, cunucos (track 7)
