= Orquesta Guayacán =

- Origin: Bogotá, Colombia
- Genres: Salsa
- Years active: 1983-present
- Labels: Sonolux, FM Discos Y Cintas and Sony Music

Guayacán Orquesta is a Colombian salsa music band.

The band was founded by Alexis Lozano, formerly of Grupo Niche, a trombone player and arranger, and includes Israel Tanenbaum, producer, pianist and arranger, and is one of the premier salsa bands in the music of Colombia. Ostual Serna is the current conga player.

== History ==
After quitting Grupo Niche, where he was a co-musical director and co-creator, Alexis Lozano founded Guayacán Orquesta in Bogotá, Colombia in 1983. The band later settled in Cali, Colombia.

Its first album, titled "The Moment of Truth is Here" (Spanish: "Llegó la hora de la verdad"), was released in 1985, with the single "You are going to cry" (Spanish: "Vas a llorar"). In 1987 and 1988, Guayacán Orquesta's second and third albums were released, with breakout songs like "Por bocón". The third album especially leaned into the genre of romantic salsa, which was popular in that era.

In 1989, Alexis Lozano began to introduce new elements in the group, evident in the poetry and melody of the composer Saturnino "Nino" Caicedo Córdoba, who is a key composer in Guayacán history. Nino Caicedo and Alexis Lozano shared childhood musical beginnings in the department of Chocó. Guayacán's fourth album, "The most beautiful" (Spanish: "La más bella"), that was released in 1989, saw it returning to its melodic roots and its breakout single “Cocorobé” helped Guayacán reach greater international recognition.

The fifth album "5 years clinging to the flavor" (Spanish: "5 años aferrados al sabor"), includes hits like "Pretty dress" (Spanish: "Vestido Bonito") and "Yolanda", the latter which was a salsa cover of Cuban trova singer, Pablo Milanes. The song "Mi muchachita" spent 6 months in first place of songs played on the radio in Colombia, Venezuela and Central America.

The sixth album, “Sentimental de Punta a Punta” (1992), included hits like “Oiga, Mire, Vea", which became one of the musical anthems of Cali. The song "Winter in Spring" (Spanish: "Invierno en primavera") helped the group gain exposure in the United States and Europe.

In the 90s, Guayacán recorded hits like "Bullfighter" (Spanish: "Torero") and fusions like "Guayacán pasodoble".

In the 2000s and beyond, the group recorded hits like "Carro de Fuego" and “Ay amor cuando hablan las miradas”. As of December 2024, they continue to be featured in Cali's Salsa Festival.

== Vocalists ==
- Cali Alemán
- Richie Valdés
- Eignar Renteria Serna
- Sebastián El Moret
- Nicco Pereira
- Paul Chacon
- Jairo Ruiz
- Charlie Zaa
- Carlos Brito
- Pedro Arroyo
- Anddy Caicedo
- Yan Collazo
- Jhon Lozano
- Maximo Torres

== Discography ==
- Llego La Hora De La Verdad (1985)
- Que La Sangre Alborota (1987)
- Guayacan Es La Orquesta (1988)
- La Mas Bella (1989)
- 5 Años Aferrados Al Sabor (1990)
- Sentimental de Punta a Punta (1991)
- Con el Corazon Abierto (1992)
- A Verso y Golpe (1993)
- Marcando La Differencia (1995)
- Como En Un Baile (1995)
- La Otra Cara (1996)
- Con Sabor Tropical (1997)
- Nadie Los Quita Lo Bailao (1998)
- Xtremo (2005)
- Bueno y Mas (2009)
- 25 Años 25 Exitos 25 Artistas (2013)
- Supernatural (2019)
