= Coexistencia =

Studio album by Luis Figueroa
- Released: May 24, 2024
- Recorded: 2023 – 2024
- Genres: Tropical music; salsa music
- Length: 21:43
- Labels: Sony Music Latin; Magnus Media LLC
- Producers: Efraín “Junito” Davila; Arbise “Motiff” Gonzalez; Luis Figueroa

Luis Figueroa chronology
Voy A Ti (2023)	Coexistencia (2024)

Singles from Coexistencia
- 1. "Llorar Bonito" Released: May 23, 2024; 2. "Medusa" Released: Nov 7, 2024

Coexistencia is the fourth studio album by Luis Figueroa, released on May 24, 2024, by Sony Music Latin and Magnus Media LLC. Continuing to push the boundaries of salsa, the album blends urban and rock elements to revitalize the tropical genre. With themes of love and loss, Coexistencia takes listeners on an emotional journey through different eras, solidifying Figueroa's position as a leading voice in the tropical music scene.

The album Includes the collaboration “Nadie La Conoce” featuring Gente De Zona. It received two nominations at the 25th Latin GRAMMY Awards, one for "Best Salsa Album" and another for "Best Tropical Song" for the single "Llorar Bonito".

== Background and commercial performance ==
Coexistencia reflects Luis Figueroa's ongoing evolution as a prominent figure in tropical music. The album blends traditional salsa with modern urban and rock influences, delivering a fresh sound to the genre. Produced by Efraín "Junito" Davila, Arbise "Motiff" Gonzalez, and Luis Figueroa, the record explores themes of love, heartbreak, and resilience.

The album's lead single, "Llorar Bonito" was released on May 23, 2024, and quickly climbed the charts, reaching #3 on the Billboard Tropical Airplay chart and #28 on the Billboard Latin Airplay chart. It also topped the Mediabase Tropical chart at #1 and has been nominated for "Best Tropical Song" at the 25th Latin GRAMMY Awards.

== Track listing ==
Coexistencia
No.	Title	Writer(s)	Producer(s)	Length
1.	"Todas Menos Una"	Luis Figueroa; Yoel Henriquez	Efraín "Junito" Davila; Luis Figueroa	4:09
2.	"Medusa"	Luis Figueroa; Yoel Henriquez; Simon Restrepo; Jorge Valdes "Dimelo Flow" Vasquez	Arbise "Motiff" Gonzalez; Luis Figueroa	3:17
3.	"Esa Diabla"	Luis Figueroa; Yoel Henriquez	Efraín "Junito" Davila; Luis Figueroa	3:57
4.	"Almas Gemelas"	Luis Figueroa; Laureano Pardo Toconac; Mateo Javier Gil Ferdinand	Arbise "Motiff" Gonzalez; Luis Figueroa	3:14
5.	"Llorar Bonito"	Luis Figueroa; Yoel Henriquez	Efraín "Junito" Davila; Luis Figueroa	3:56
6.	"Nadie La Conoce x Gente De Zona"	Luis Figueroa; Laureano Pardo Toconac; Nario Pardo; Mateo Gil Ferdinand; Alexander Delgado Hernandez; Randy Malcom	Arbise "Motiff" Gonzalez; Luis Figueroa	3:10
Total length:				21:43

== Charts ==
=== Llorar Bonito ===
Chart performance for "Llorar Bonito"
Chart (2024)	Peak position
US Tropical Airplay (Billboard)	3
US Latin Airplay (Billboard)	28
Mediabase Tropical	1
