= Decisión unánime =

Decisión Unánime

Studio album by Víctor Manuelle
- Released: May 9, 2006
- Recorded: 2005–2006
- Studio: Romeo Entertainment Sixpack Music (New York City, USA); Negrele Music; Rolo Studio (San Juan, Puerto Rico)
- Genre: Latin pop; salsa
- Length: 55:02
- Label: Sony BMG Norte
- Producer: José M. Lugo; Víctor Manuelle (Executive producer)

Víctor Manuelle chronology
En Vivo Desde Carnegie Hall (2005)	Decisión Unánime (2006)	Navidad a Mi Estilo (2007)

Singles from Decisión Unánime
- 1. "Nuestro Amor Se Ha Vuelto Ayer" Released: March 13, 2006; 2. "Maldita Suerte" Released: September 11, 2006; 3. "Nunca Había Llorado Así" Released: January 15, 2007

Professional ratings
Review scores
Source	Rating
Allmusic	4.5/5 stars

Decisión Unánime (English: Unanimous Decision) is the tenth studio album recorded by Puerto Rican-American salsa singer-songwriter Víctor Manuelle. The album was released by Sony BMG Norte on May 9, 2006 (see 2006 in music). It produced three singles, "Nuestro Amor Se Ha Vuelto Ayer" feat. Yuridia which reached No. 8 on Billboard Hot Latin Songs and No. 1 on Billboard Tropical Airplay, "Maldita Suerte" feat. Sin Bandera, and "Nunca Había Llorado Así" feat. Don Omar. The album was certified Disco de Platino by the RIAA for shipments of 100,000 units in the United States.

== Track listing ==
1. El Perdedor – 4:29
2. Nuestro Amor Se Ha Vuelto Ayer – 4:58
3. Vamos De Nuevo (featuring Héctor Delgado, Yomo, & Mikey Genao) – 4:48
4. Puerto Rico 2006 (featuring Eddie Palmieri) – 5:24
5. Maldita Suerte – 4:41
6. Nunca Había Llorado Así (featuring Don Omar) – 4:58
7. Dos Generaciones (featuring Eddie Palmieri) – 6:00
8. ¿A Qué Te Supo? – 4:24
9. Cenizas – 4:22
10. Hazme Sentir – 4:52
11. Nuestro Amor Se Ha Vuelto Ayer (Ballad Version) (featuring Yuridia) – 3:59
12. Maldita Suerte (featuring Sin Bandera) (Ballad Version) – 4:16
13. Agradecimientos – 2:09

== Personnel ==
- Coro - Adalberto Santiago
- Art Direction - Alberto Carballo
- Composer - Alejandro Lerner
- Trombone - Angel Vazquez
- Trombone - Antonio Vazquez
- Computer Engineering - Benji Rodriguez
- Arranger - Bobby Valentin
- Trumpet - Carlos Martinez
- Percussion, Timbales - Chago Martinez
- Coro - Cheo Feliciano
- Composer - Claudia Brant
- Coro - Domingo Quinones
- Primary Artist - Don Omar
- Piano, Primary Artist - Eddie Palmieri
- Synthesizer Arrangements - Eric Persing
- Arranger - Ernesto Sanchez
- Engineer, Mastering, Mixing - Francisco Hurtado
- Contractor - George Rivera
- Composer - Gil Francisco
- Primary Artist - Hector El Father
- Trumpet - Jan Duclerc
- Arranger - Javier Fernandez
- Bongos - John "Dandy" Rodriguez
- Trumpet - John Walsh
- Ampeg Baby Bass - Johnny Torres
- Trombone - Jorge Diaz
- Guitar - Jorge Laboy
- Timbales - Jose "Cochi" Claussell
- Arranger, Conductor, Engineer, Keyboards, Mastering, Mixing, Organ, Percussion Programming, Piano, Producer, Synthesizer - Jose Lugo
- Assistant Engineer - Justin Kessler
- Bongos, Congas - Marc Quinones
- Arranger, Piano, Violin - Mariano Morales
- Make-Up, Peinado - Martha Medina
- Synthesizer Arrangements - Matt Traum
- Gaita, Tambor - Pablo Padin
- Percussion - Pablo Rosario
- Arranger - Ramon B. Sanchez
- Coro - Ramon Rodriguez
- Trumpet - Raul Agraz
- Drums - Ray Torres
- Engineer, Mastering, Mixing - Rolando Alejandro
- Bariton Saxophone - Ronnie Cuber
- Engineer - Ronnie Torres
- Coro - Tito Allen
- Arranger, Trumpet - Tommy Villarini
- Executive Producer, Primary Artist - Victor Manuelle
- Performer, Primary Artist - Yuridia
- Baritone Saxophone - Angel Torres

== Charts ==
=== Weekly charts ===
Chart (2006)	Peak position
US Billboard 200	140
US Top Latin Albums (Billboard)	6
US Tropical Albums (Billboard)	1

=== Year-end charts ===
Chart (2006)	Position
US Top Latin Albums (Billboard)	62

== Sales and certifications ==
Region	Certification	Certified units/sales
United States (RIAA)	Platinum (Latin)	100,000^{^}
^{^} Shipments figures based on certification alone.

== Awards/nominations ==
Year	Award	Result	Category
2007	2007 Billboard Latin Music Awards	Won	Tropical Album of the Year, Male
2008	Premio Los Nuestro	Won	Tropical Salsa, Artist of the Year

== See also ==
- List of number-one Billboard Tropical Albums from the 2000s
