= Grupo Niche =

Colombian salsa band

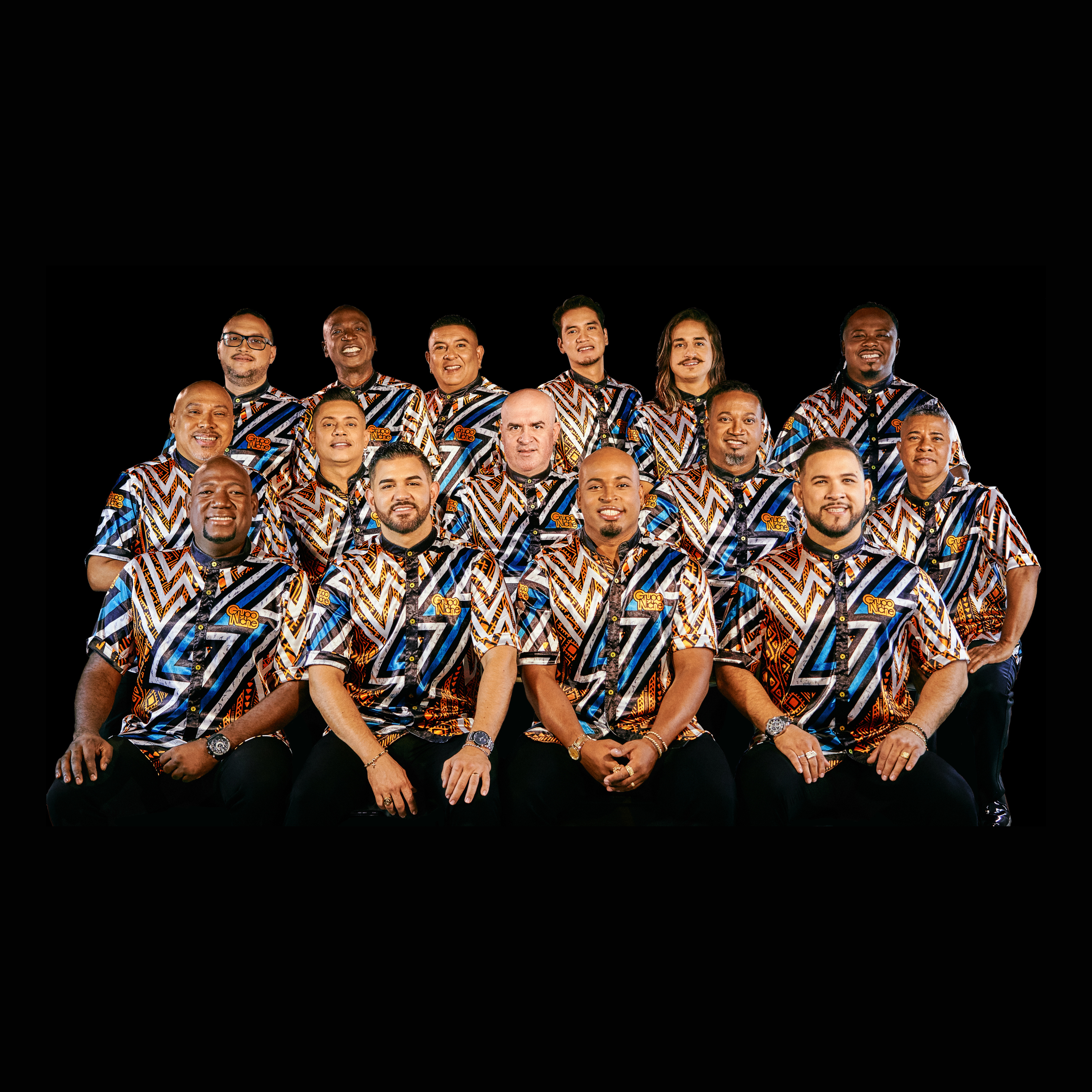

Background information
- Origin: Cali, Colombia
- Genre: Salsa
- Years active: 1978–present
- Label: Productores Profesionales de la Música (PPM)
- Past members: Douglas Guevara; Francisco Garcia; Alexis Lozano; Saulo Sanchez; Willy Garcia; Jairo Varela; Moncho Santana; Tito Gomez; Tuto Jimenez; Alvaro del Castillo; Javier Vasquez; Charlie Cardona; Jorge Cuero Bazan; Charlie Zaa
- Website: Official website

Grupo Niche is a salsa group founded in 1978 in Bogotá, Colombia. It enjoys great popularity throughout Latin America. It was founded by Jairo Varela and Alexis Lozano. Varela remained with the group throughout his life, serving as producer, director, songwriter, vocalist, and guiro player. Alexis Lozano, trombone player and arranger later left to form Orquesta Guayacán. The group also included Nicolas Cristancho "Macabi" on the piano, Francisco Garcia "Porky" on the bass, Luis Pacheco, on the congas, and vocalists Jorge Bazán and Hector Viveros.

Grupo Niche's first album, "Al Pasito", released in 1979, did little to challenge the dominating salsa band of Colombia at the time, Fruko y sus Tesos. Two years later, however, the group found success with their second album, "Querer es Poder", particularly with the single "Buenaventura y Caney".

The group relocated in 1982 to Cali, where they have been based since. After recording two more albums, Grupo Niche released "No Hay Quinto Malo" in 1984, which featured their signature song, "Cali Pachanguero". The tribute hit single to the "world salsa pito" catapulted Niche as one of the top salsa bands of Colombia.

In 1986, the band incorporated Puerto Rican vocalist Tito Gomez, who had previously worked with the famous Puerto Rican salsa group, La Sonora Ponceña, and Ray Barretto, the Godfather of Latin Jazz. Later that year, Grupo Niche released "Me Huele a Matrimonio". Afterward, yet another Puerto Rican joined, the pianist Israel Tanenbaum, who would eventually leave the group to join a Niche spin-off band: Orquesta Guayacán.

Grupo Niche is known for both its vigorous, uptempo dance music as well as slower-paced romantic numbers. Among its best known hits are "Cali Aji", "Del Puente Pa'llá", "Sin Sentimientos", "Una Aventura", "Etnia", "Gotas de Lluvia", "Han Cogido la Cosa", "Mi Pueblo Natal", "Hagamos lo que Diga el Corazón", "Duele Mas", "Nuestro Sueño", and the famous cumbia "Canoa Rancha". In 2002 they recorded the album Control Absoluto in Miami Florida with the engineers Alex Arias and Jossel Calveiro.

Some other singers from Niche throughout its history include Alvaro del Castillo, Floriza "La Coco" Lozano, Tuto Jiménez, Saulo Sanchez, Tito Gomez, Moncho Santana, Charlie Cardona as well as Willy García and Javier Vasquez, now members of the group 'Son de Cali'. Most recently joined are Puerto Ricans Oswaldo Roman and Julio Lopez and Buenaventura native Elvis Magno. They have been very successful, and some of their songs are considered Classics of Salsa Music. The group still enjoys some of its past successes, and keeps on tour, making worldwide presentations, and singing their most memorable songs.

Musician Tito Gomez, who fronted the group for 7 1/2 years (1985–1992), died on June 12, 2007, in Cali, the city where Grupo Niche was established.

== Jairo Varela ==
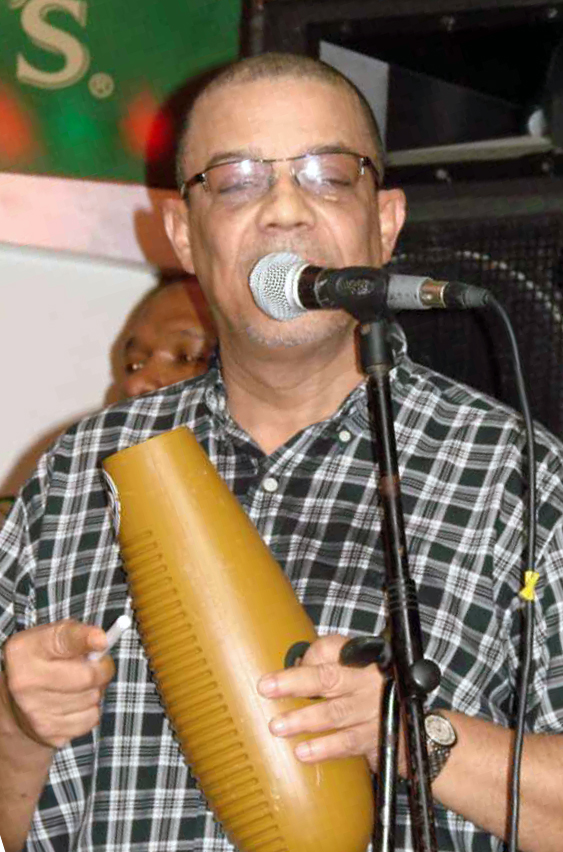
Circa 2007 - Jairo Varela – Conversaciones con Jairo Varela

Bandleader and co-founder Jairo de Fátima Varela Martínez was born on 9 December 1949 in Quibdó, Colombia, the son of merchant Pedro Antonio Varela Restrepo and writer and poet, Teresa de Jesús Martínez Arce.

His first contact with music occurred when he was eight years old, in the barrio of Roma de Quibdó where he formed the group "La Timba", essentially composed of musicians playing only the flute, bongos, maracas and güiro.

At the age of 62, Varela was found dead in his Cali home on August 8, 2012, apparently from heart failure. Jairo's daughter, Yanila Varela has been the owner of Grupo Niche since her father's death.

== Grupo Niche in Canada ==
Grupo Niche played in Montreal on July 21, 2001, for a party to celebrate the independence of Colombia (July 20). Grupo Niche was also accompanied that night with another band called Balmore Estrada y su Nueva Sensacion, who was formed in the late 1980s by Balmore Estrada.

Grupo Niche also played again in Montreal, on July 15, 2006, in the festival colombiano, October 2008 and on May 8, 2010, to celebrate the 30th anniversary of the band. According to the Latin site Hola Calgary on October 11, 2008, Grupo Niche played at the Jack Singer Concert Hall EPCOR Centre for the Performing Arts in Calgary, Alberta.

== Discography ==
- Al Pasito (1979)
- Querer es Poder (1981)
- Prepárate... (1982)
- Directo Desde New York! (1983)
- No Hay Quinto Malo (1984)
- Triunfo (1985)
- Me Huele a Matrimonio (1986)
- Con Cuerdas (1987)
- Historia Musical (1987)
- Tapando el Hueco (1988)
- Sutil y Contundente (1989)
- Cielo de Tambores (1990)
- Llegando al 100% (1991)
- 12 años con su éxito Mexico, Mexico (1992)
- Un Alto en el Camino (1993)
- Huellas del Pasado (1995)
- Etnia (1996)
- A Prueba de Fuego (1997)
- Señales de Humo (1998)
- A Golpe de Folklore (1999)
- Propuesta (2000)
- La Danza de la Chancaca (2001)
- Control Absoluto (2002)
- Imaginación (2004)
- Alive (2005)
- Tocando el Cielo con las Manos (2013)
- 35 Aniversario (2015)
- 40 (2020) - Winner, Best Tropical Latin Album, 2021 GRAMMY Award
- Rupelto Mena(2022)
- Niche Sinfónico (2023) - Winner, Best Salsa Album, 2023 Latin GRAMMY Award

=== Compilations ===
- Historia Musical, Vol. 1 (1988)
- Grandes Éxitos (1988)
- 12 Años (1993)
- Historia Musical, Vol. 2 (1993)
- Brillantes (1994)
- The Best (1994)
- Brillantes, Vol. 2 (1995)
- El Único: Best of Grupo Niche, Vol. 3 (1995)
- Cara A Cara (1997)
- 20th Anniversary (1999)
- Siempre Una Aventura (2000)
- Antología (2000)
- Solamente Tú (2001)
- 20 Años: La Danza de la Chancaca (2001)
- 22 Ultimate Hits (2002)
- 20 Éxitos Originales (2005)
- 2 Grandes Voces (2007)
- Una Aventura... La Historia (2007)
- 10 de Colección (2008)
- Los Clásicos del Grupo Niche (2009)
- Mis Favoritas (2010)
- Frente A Frente (2013)

== Sources ==
- Waxer, Lise. "En Conga, Bonga y Campana:" The Rise of Colombian Salsa. Latin American Music Review, Vol. 21, No. 2. (Autumn - Winter, 2000), pp 118–168 (2002)
- Official website
