= Víctor Manuelle =

Puerto Rican-American musician (born 1968)

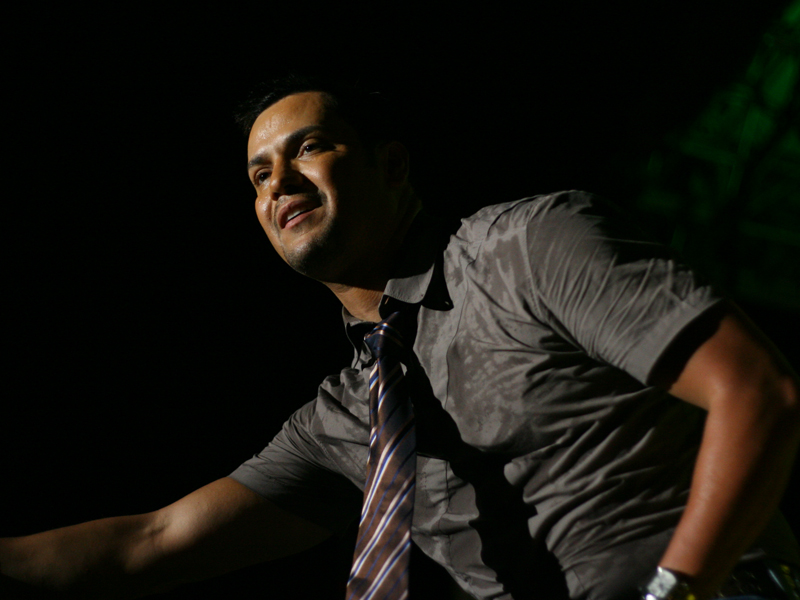

Background information
- Also known as: El Sonero de la Juventud ("The Sonero of the Youth")
- Born: Víctor Manuel Ruiz Velázquez; September 27, 1968 (age 58); New York City, U.S.
- Origin: Isabela, Puerto Rico
- Genres: Salsa; ballads; boleros; Latin pop
- Occupations: Musician; singer; composer
- Instruments: Vocals; maracas
- Years active: 1985–present
- Labels: Sony; Machete; Columbia

Víctor Manuel Ruiz Velázquez (born September 27, 1968), known professionally as Víctor Manuelle, is a Puerto Rican salsa singer, known to his fans as El Sonero de la Juventud ("The Singer of Youths"). He is identified primarily with salsa romántica or "salsa monga". Víctor Manuelle has neither recorded in English or in other languages, nor made a Latin pop album or any other genre, nor (with rare exceptions) ventured into acting or politics, preferring to remain a musician grounded within salsa music and singing exclusively in Spanish.

== Discovery and early career ==
Ruiz is the son of Víctor Manuel Ruiz, Sr. (1949-2018) and Jenny Velásquez. Both parents are Puerto Ricans and he has a brother called Héctor Gustavo Ruiz. Although born in New York City, Victor was raised primarily in Isabela, Puerto Rico, where he enjoyed salsa music. His singing career began with salsa superstar Gilberto Santa Rosa's invitation on stage during the graduation party concert at Manuelle's high school. After his classmates' bragged on Victor's skills, Santa Rosa invited him to jump up and sing along. To Santa Rosa's surprise, Victor could not only sing, he free-styled improvising soneo lyrics, trading them with Santa Rosa. Soon after at Santa Rosa's advice, Puerto Rican bandleader Don Periñon hired the teenage Victor as a backup singer.

== 1990s–2000s ==
Manuelle emerged as a leading voice among the generation of New York salsa performers who rose to prominence in the mid-'90s, along with Marc Anthony and La India, who were his only rivals in terms of success and popularity. Mentored by Gilberto Santa Rosa and produced by Sergio George, Manuelle regularly topped the tropical charts during his mid-'90s peak, as his albums Victor Manuelle (1996) and A Pesar de Todo (1997) spun off a parade of No. 1 hits. The esteemed sonero continued his hit-making in the years that followed, as every single one of his studio albums in the successive decade spun off at least one tropical chart-topper of its own.

Manuelle has become one of the best-selling salsa performers of recent years, with his albums selling a combined 1 million-plus copies in the U.S. Three studio albums, 1999's Inconfundible ("Unmistakable"), 2001's Instinto Y Deseo ("Instinct and Desire") and 2004's Travesía ("Crossover"), have cracked Billboard's overall Top 200 Albums chart, and the latter two reached No. 1 on the Latin Album chart (Inconfundible reached No. 2). While several of his singles have made the Top 5 or Top 10 on the Latin charts, he had to wait for 2004's Tengo Ganas ("I'm in the Mood") to score a Billboard No. 1 Latin hit.

Perhaps his moment of greatest visibility came when he, to the happy surprise of the attendees, sang an a cappella version of Celia Cruz's signature song, La Vida Es Un Carnaval ("Life is a Carnival"), at her funeral at St. Patrick's Cathedral in New York in July 2003. This scene was replayed numerous times in the ensuing days on Spanish-language television. Manuelle had performed the song for Cruz, with full orchestra, at a televised tribute concert for her, the last concert at which she ever performed on stage.

== Recent activity ==
Manuelle's most recent production was released in May 2009. However, on this disc, not all of his songs have to do with topics of 'Love', 'Infidelity', etc. Nonetheless, it does include various interludes where he explains the meaning of songs related to his personal life, which is why the album is called; "Muy Personal" (Very Personal).

Manuelle released his 10th studio album, Decisión Unánime ("Unanimous Decision"), in May 2005. Six months earlier, in November 2005, he and his mentor, Gilberto Santa Rosa, released a joint live album, Dos Soneros, Una Historia ("Two Soneros, One History"), recorded at Coliseo Roberto Clemente outside San Juan, Puerto Rico. Manuelle's own live album, Víctor Manuelle En Vivo: Desde El Carnegie Hall, came out in early 2005. He served as co-host of the 7th Annual Latin Grammy Awards, held November 2, 2006, in New York.

Manuelle's first foray into movie acting was his cameo role (mostly singing) as salsa legend Rubén Blades in El Cantante, the 2007 film biography of Héctor Lavoe, starring Marc Anthony and Jennifer Lopez. In the movie he sang an acoustic version in a club of the famous El Cantante On June 10, 2008, Manuelle released the album Soy ("I am). He was one of several artists selected to perform at the "KQ Live Concert" on September 27, 2008, organized by KQ 105 FM. The event included several renowned artists from Puerto Rico and other Latin American countries.

On February 8, 2010, television network Univision announced international singer Ana Bárbara and Víctor Manuelle as the hosts of the 2010 Premio Lo Nuestro Awards. The ceremony took place live from Miami, Florida on February 18, 2010.

On February 13, 2020, Víctor Manuelle was the featured singer on Norberto Vélez's YouTube channel titled "Sesiones Desde La Loma Ep. 5".

== Discography ==
- Justo a Tiempo (1993)
- Sólo Contigo (1994)
- Víctor Manuelle (1996)
- A Pesar de Todo (1997)
- Ironias (1998)
- Inconfundible (1999)
- Instinto y Deseo (2001)
- Le Preguntaba a la Luna (2002)
- Travesía (2004)
- Decisión Unánime (2006)
- Una Navidad a Mi Estilo (2007)
- Soy (2008)
- Yo Mismo (2009)
- Muy Personal (2009)
- Busco Un Pueblo (2011)
- Me Llamaré Tuyo (2013)
- Que Suenen los Tambores (2015)
- 25/7 (2018)
- Memorias de Navidad (2019)
- Lado A Lado B (2022)
- Retromántico (2024)
