= List of awards and nominations received by Gloria Estefan =

Gloria Estefan awards and nominations
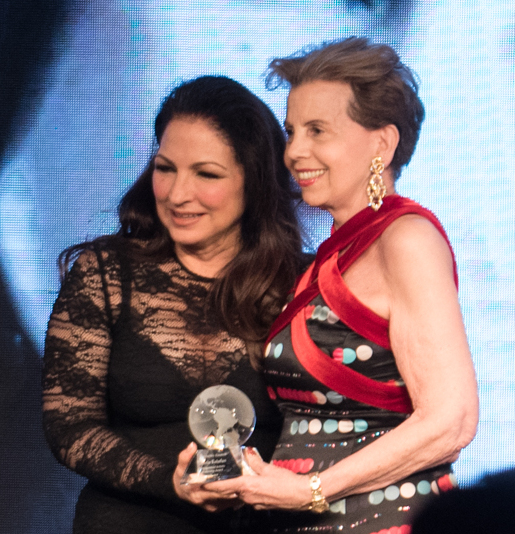
- Estefan (left) receiving the 2018 Distinguished Artistic Leadership Award
Awards and nominations
Award	Wins	Nominations
ALMA Award	7	10
American Music Awards	2	4
Billboard Latin Music Awards	15	22
Billboard Music Awards	1	1
BMI Latin Awards	9	9
Brit Awards	0	1
Grammy Awards	5	12
Latin Grammy Awards	4	7
Lo Nuestro Awards	11	24
MTV Video Music Awards	1	1
Pollstar Awards	0	1

Totals (Note: Certain award groups do not simply award one winner. They acknowledge several different recipients, have runners-up, and have third place. Since this is a specific recognition and is different from losing an award, runner-up mentions are considered wins in this award tally. For simplification and to avoid errors, each award in this list has been presumed to have had a prior nomination.)
- Wins: 390
- Nominations: 560

Gloria Estefan is a Cuban-American singer-songwriter who has achieved various nominations and awards in her multi-decades career. With 100 million records sold, she was the all-time best-selling Latina singer and remains as one of the best-selling music artists of all-time.

She has won five Grammy Awards from 14 nominations, four Latin Grammy Awards from 7 nominations, several BMI Awards and Billboard Latin Music Awards among others. Gloria became the first Latin women to receive Songwriter of the Year by BMI Awards in 1991. Her contributions and success have been recognized by various organizations, including an Icon Award by the Recording Industry Association of America (RIAA) in 2023.

Some awards were bestowed to both Emilio and Gloria Estefan. The Estefans have worked together since 1975 when they formed Miami Sound Machine, with Gloria as lead vocalist and Emilio handling the production. Since that time their scope has broadened, including Gloria's solo career. They received highest honors for civilians including a Presidential Medal of Freedom in 2019—highest U.S. civil award—becoming the first couple to receive the award. They also became the first marriage and first Hispanics to receive the Library of Congress Gershwin Prize for Popular Song in 2019. The inaugural Variety's Miami Entertainment Town Gala in 2022, honored the couple with The Legends and Groundbreakers Award recognizing them as Miami's "most notable musical pioneers" who "helped put Miami on the map with the revolutionary stylings of their Miami Sound Machine".

Gloria has been recognized for her charitable endeavours, winning the inaugurals Spirit of Love Award in 1991 (Ronald MacDonald), Alexis de Tocqueville Award in 1993 (United Way), and the Spirit of Hope Award in 1996 (Billboard Latin Music Awards). She is also the first women to be named Person of the Year by the Latin Recording Academy in 2008. In addition, Gloria has been admitted into multiple Halls and Walk of Fames, including being the first Latina inducted into the Songwriters Hall of Fame. She has also obtained a number of honorary degrees in various institutions, including the University of Miami, Barry University and Berklee College of Music.

== Awards and nominations ==
Award/organization (Note: Charts are not included, unless they are explicitly described as "awards" or specific trophies are given.)	Year	Nominee/work	Category	Result	Ref.
Academy of Achievement	1997	Gloria Estefan	Presidential Medal of Freedom	Honoree	
ALMA Award	1996	The Evolution Tour Live in Miami	Outstanding Comedy, Variety, or Music Series/Special	Won	
ALMA Award	1996	The Evolution Tour Live in Miami	Outstanding Performance by a Female - Variety or Music Series/Special	Won	
ALMA Award	1996	Intimate Portrait: Gloria Estefan	Outstanding Made-for-TV Documentary	Won	
ALMA Award	1999	"Heaven's What I Feel"	Outstanding Music Video	Won	
ALMA Award	1999	Gloria Estefan at The World Music Awards (ABC)	Outstanding Host In a Variety/Music/Comedy Special or Series	Won	
ALMA Award	1999	Gloria Estefan at The World Music Awards (ABC)	Outstanding Performance by an Individual in a Music Series or Special	Nominated	
ALMA Award	1999	Gloria Estefan & Emilio Estefan	The ALMA Montalban Lifetime Achievement Award	Honoree	
ALMA Award	2000	"Music of My Heart" (with *NSYNC)	Outstanding Music Video Performer	Won	
ALMA Award	2000	Gloria Estefan in Music of the Heart	Outstanding Actress in a Feature Film	Nominated	
ALMA Award	2012	Gloria Estefan	Favorite Female Music Artist	Nominated	
American Music Awards	1990	"Don't Wanna Lose You"	Favorite Pop/Rock Song	Nominated	
American Music Awards	1994	Gloria Estefan	Favorite Pop/Rock Female Artist	Nominated	
American Music Awards	2000	Gloria Estefan	Award of Merit	Honoree	
American Music Awards	2026	Gloria Estefan	Best Female Latin Artist	Nominated	
ASCAP Pop Music Awards	1992	"Coming Out of the Dark"	Most Performed Song	Won	
Asociación de Hispanos (Nosotros)	1990	Gloria Estefan	Most Outstanding Female Artist	Won	
Association of Latin Entertainment Critics (ACE, New York)	1989	Gloria Estefan	Female Figure of the Year	Nominated	
Association of Latin Entertainment Critics (ACE, New York)	1994	Gloria Estefan / Mi Tierra	Female Figure of the Year — Tropical	Won	
Association of Latin Entertainment Critics (ACE, New York)	1994	Gloria Estefan	Female Figure of the Year	Nominated	
Association of Latin Entertainment Critics (ACE, New York)	1996	Gloria Estefan	Female Star of the Year	Nominated	
Association of Latin Entertainment Critics (ACE, New York)	1999	Gloria Estefan / Gloria!	Female Figure of the Year	Nominated	
Atlantic Council	2018	Gloria Estefan	Distinguished Artistic Leadership Award	Won	
B'nai B'rith Dinner	1992	Gloria Estefan	Humanitarian of the Year	Honoree	
Billboard Latin Music Awards	1994	Gloria Estefan	Tropical/Salsa Artist of The Year, Female	Won	
Billboard Latin Music Awards	1994	Mi Tierra	Tropical/Salsa Album of The Year	Won	
Billboard Latin Music Awards	1994	"Mi Tierra"	Tropical/Salsa Song of The Year	Won	
Billboard Latin Music Awards	1996	Gloria Estefan	Spirit of Hope Award	Honoree	
Billboard Latin Music Awards	1996	"Abriendo Puertas"	Latin Dance Single Of The Year	Won	
Billboard Latin Music Awards	1996	"Abriendo Puertas"	Tropical/Salsa Video of the Year	Won	
Billboard Latin Music Awards	1996	Abriendo Puertas	Tropical/Salsa Album of the Year, Female	Won	
Billboard Latin Music Awards	1999	"Oye!"	Latin Dance Maxi-Single of the Year	Nominated	
Billboard Latin Music Awards	1999	"Oye!"	Latin Dance Club Play of the Year	Won	
Billboard Latin Music Awards	2000	"Santo Santo" (Só Pra Contrariar featuring Gloria Estefan)	Latin Dance Maxi-Single of the Year	Won	
Billboard Latin Music Awards	2000	"Santo Santo" (Só Pra Contrariar featuring Gloria Estefan)	Hot Latin Track of the Year, Vocal Duo	Nominated	
Billboard Latin Music Awards	2001	"No Me Dejes de Querer"	Latin Dance Club Play Track of the Year	Nominated	
Billboard Latin Music Awards	2001	"No Me Dejes de Querer"	Latin Dance Maxi-Single of the Year	Nominated	
Billboard Latin Music Awards	2001	Alma Caribeña	Tropical/Salsa Album of the Year, Female	Won	
Billboard Latin Music Awards	2002	"Out of Nowhere"	Latin Dance Club Play Track of the Year	Nominated	
Billboard Latin Music Awards	2002	"Out of Nowhere"	Latin Dance Maxi-Single of the Year	Nominated	
Billboard Latin Music Awards	2004	"Hoy"	Latin Pop Airplay Track of the Year, Female	Won	
Billboard Latin Music Awards	2005	"Tu Fotografía"	Tropical Airplay Track Of The Year, Female	Won	
Billboard Latin Music Awards	2008	90 Millas	Tropical Album of the Year, Female	Won	
Billboard Latin Music Awards	2008	"No Llores"	Tropical Airplay Song of the Year, Female	Won	
Billboard Latin Music Awards	2009	"Píntame De Colores"	Tropical Airplay Song of the Year, Female	Nominated	
Billboard Latin Music Awards	2011	Gloria Estefan	Spirit of Hope Award	Honoree	
Billboard Latin Women in Music	2024	Gloria Estefan	Legend Award	Honoree	
Billboard Number One Awards (Note: Prior to the inauguration of the Billboard Music Awards in 1990, the magazine had the "Number One Awards" to honor the top-performing artists of the year on each of chart categories.)	1989	Gloria Estefan	Top Pop Singles Artist	Nominated	
Billboard Number One Awards	1989	Gloria Estefan	Top Adult Contemporary Artist	Nominated	
Billboard Number One Awards	1989	Cuts Both Ways	Top Pop Compact Disk	Nominated	
Billboard Number One Awards	1989	"Don't Wanna Lose You"	Top Adult Contemporary Single	Nominated	
Billboard Number One Awards	1989	"Si Voy a Perderte"	Top Hot Latin Track	Nominated	
Billboard Music Awards	1990	Gloria Estefan	Adult Contemporary Female Artist	Won	
Billboard Music Video Award	1991	"Desde la Oscuridad"	Best Latin Female Video	Won	
Billboard Music Video Award	1994	"Con Los Años Que Me Quedan"	Best Latin Video	Won	
Billboard Music Video Award	1995	"Everlasting Love"	Best Dance Video	Won	
Billboard Music Video Award	2001	"No Me Dejes de Querer"	Best Latin Video	Nominated	
Blockbuster Entertainment Awards	2000	"Music of My Heart" (with *NSYNC)	Favorite Song from a Movie	Won	
Blockbuster Entertainment Awards	2001	Gloria Estefan / Alma Caribeña	Favorite Artist — Latino (Internet Only)	Nominated	
BMI Latin Awards	1994	Gloria Estefan & Emilio	Special Citation	Honoree	
BMI Latin Awards	1994	"Otro Dia Más Sin Verte"	Latin Song of the Year	Won	
BMI Latin Awards	1995	"Con Los Años Que Me Quedan"	Award-winning songs	Won	
BMI Latin Awards	1996	Gloria Estefan & Emilio	BMI President's Award	Honoree	
BMI Latin Awards	1999	"Corazón Prohibido"	Award-winning songs	Won	
BMI Latin Awards	2000	"Oye!"	Award-winning songs	Won	
BMI Latin Awards	2001	"No Me Dejes de Querer"	Award-winning songs	Won	
BMI Latin Awards	2009	Gloria Estefan	Icon Award	Honoree	
BMI Latin Awards	2022	Gloria Estefan & Emilio	Board of Directors Award	Honoree	
BMI Million-Air Awards	1988	"Words Get in the Way"	1 Million Award	Won	
BMI Million-Air Awards	1994	"Always Tomorrow"	1 Million Award	Won	
BMI Million-Air Awards	1994	"Angel"	1 Million Award	Won	
BMI Million-Air Awards	1994	"Otro Dia Más Sin Verte"	1 Million Award	Won	
BMI Million-Air Awards	1994	"Just Another Day"	1 Million Award	Won	
BMI Pop Awards	1987	"Words Get in the Way"	Performance Award	Won	
BMI Pop Awards	1989	Gloria Estefan	Songwriter of the Year	Won	
BMI Pop Awards	1989	"Anything for You"	Award-Winning Songs	Won	
BMI Pop Awards	1989	"1-2-3"	Award-Winning Songs	Won	
BMI Pop Awards	1989	"Rhythm Is Gonna Get You"	Award-Winning Songs	Won	
BMI Pop Awards	1992	"Coming Out of the Dark"	Award-Winning Songs	Won	
BMI Pop Awards	1993	"Live for Loving You"	Award-Winning Songs	Won	
BMI Pop Awards	1993	"Otro Dia Más Sin Verte"	Award-Winning Songs	Won	
BMI Pop Awards	1994	"Always Tomorrow"	Award-Winning Songs	Won	
BMI Pop Awards	1994	"Angel"	Award-Winning Songs	Won	
BMI Pop Awards	2003	"Whenever, Wherever"	Song List	Won	
Brazilian-American Chamber of Commerce of Florida (BACCF)	2022	Gloria Estefan	Excellence Award	Honoree	
Brit Awards	1990	Gloria Estefan	Best International Artist	Nominated	
Broadway Global	2019	Gloria Estefan	Producer of the Year	Nominated	
CableACE Award	1993	Gloria Estefan: Going Home	Best Music Special	Won	
Cadena 100	1994	Gloria Estefan	Un Año de Rock Awards	Won	
Carnegie Corporation of New York	2006	Gloria Estefan	2006 Great Immigrants Honorees	Honoree	
Casandra Awards	1997	Gloria Estefan	Soberano International	Honoree	
Cashbox Year-End Awards	1989	Cuts Both Ways	Pop Album of the Year	Nominated	
Cashbox Year-End Awards	1989	Gloria Estefan	Top A/C Female Artists	2nd place	
Cashbox Year-End Awards	1989	Gloria Estefan	Top Female Artist — Pop Singles	Nominated	
Cashbox Year-End Awards	1989	Gloria Estefan	Top A/C Female Artists — Pop Singles	Nominated	
Cashbox Year-End Awards	1989	"Don't Wanna Lose You"	Top Pop Single	Nominated	
Cashbox Year-End Awards	1990	Gloria Estefan	Top A/C Female — Pop Singles	Nominated	
Cashbox Year-End Awards	1991	"Coming Out of the Dark"	Top Pop Single	Nominated	
Cashbox Year-End Awards	1991	Into the Light	Top Pop Album	Nominated	
Celebration of Cinema and Television	2021	Vivo	Film Music Award	Won	
Coalition of Hispanic American Women	1994	Gloria Estefan	Achievement Award	Honoree	
Congressional Hispanic Caucus Institute	2002	Gloria Estefan & Emilio	Medallion of Excellence for Community Service	Honoree	
Critics Choice Association	2000	"Music of My Heart" (with *NSYNC)	Best Song	Won	
Daytime Emmy Awards	2021	Red Table Talk: The Estefans (with Emily & Lili Estefan)	Outstanding Informative Talk Show Host	Nominated	
Daytime Emmy Awards	2022	Red Table Talk: The Estefans (with Emily & Lili Estefan)	Outstanding Informative Talk Show Host	Nominated	
Desi Entertainment Awards	1992	Gloria Estefan	Entertainer of the Year	Won	
Desi Entertainment Awards	1992	"Live for Loving You"	Song of the Year	Won	
Desi Entertainment Awards	1995	Gloria Estefan	Performer of the Year	Won	
Ellis Island Honors Society	1993	Gloria Estefan	Ellis Island Medal of Honor	Honoree	
Ellis Island Honors Society	2009	Gloria Estefan	Family Heritage Awards	Honoree	
Entertainment Community Fund	2016	Gloria Estefan	The Fund's Medal of Honor	Honoree	
Film Florida	2017	Gloria Estefan & Emilio	Film Florida Legends Tourism Ambassador Recipient	Honoree	
GLAAD Media Award	2021	Emily's Coming Out Story from Red Table Talk: The Estefans	Outstanding Variety or Talk Show Episode	Nominated	
Globo Awards (New York) (Note: transl. Globe Awards)	2000	Gloria Estefan	Pop Female Artist	Won	
Golden Eagles Awards	1990	Gloria Estefan	Outstanding Female Performer	Won	
Grammy Awards	1990	"Don't Wanna Lose You"	Best Female Pop Vocal Performance	Nominated	
Grammy Awards	1994	Mi Tierra	Best Tropical Latin Album	Won	
Grammy Awards	1996	Abriendo Puertas	Best Tropical Latin Performance	Won	
Grammy Awards	1997	"Reach"	Best Female Pop Vocal Performance	Nominated	
Grammy Awards	1999	"Heaven's What I Feel"	Best Dance Recording	Nominated	
Grammy Awards	2000	"Don't Stop"	Best Long Form Music Video	Nominated	
Grammy Awards	2000	"Don't Let This Moment End"	Best Dance Recording	Nominated	
Grammy Awards	2000	"Music of My Heart" (with *NSYNC)	Best Pop Collaboration With Vocals	Nominated	
Grammy Awards	2001	Alma Caribeña	Best Traditional Tropical Latin Album	Won	
Grammy Awards	2002	"Out of Nowhere"	Best Dance Recording	Nominated	
Grammy Awards	2014	The Standards	Best Traditional Pop Vocal Album	Nominated	
Grammy Awards	2025	"Bemba Colorá" (Sheila E. featuring Gloria Estefan & Mimy Succar)	Best Global Music Performance	Won	
Grammy Awards	2026	Raíces	Best Tropical Latin Album	Won	
Greater Miami Chamber of Commerce Sand	2013	Gloria Estefan & Emilio	In My Shoes Award	Honoree	
Hispanic Federation	2007	Gloria Estefan & Emilio	Legacy Award	Honoree	
Hispanic Heritage Foundation	1993	Gloria Estefan	Hispanic Heritage Award	Honoree	
International Dance Music Awards	2013	"Hotel Nacional"	Best Latin Dance Track	Nominated	
International Latin Music Hall of Fame	2003	Gloria Estefan	Beny Moré Memorial Award	Honoree	
Irish Recorded Music Awards (IRMA)	1990	Gloria Estefan	Best International Female Singer	Won	
Joe DiMaggio Children's Hospital Foundation	2017	Gloria Estefan	American Icon Award	Honoree	
Kids' Choice Awards	2000	"Music of My Heart" (with *NSYNC)	Favorite Song from a Movie	Nominated	
L'ATTITUDE Conference	2020	Gloria Estefan & Emilio	Artistic Career	Honoree	
Latin American Music Awards	2021	Brazil305	Tropical/Favorite Album	Nominated	
Latin Entertainment Industry Group of the City of Hope	2004	Gloria Estefan & Emilio	Spirit of Life Award	Honoree	
Latin Entertainment Industry Group of the City of Hope	2005	Gloria Estefan & Emilio	Spirit of Life Award	Honoree	
Latin Grammy Awards	2000	"No Me Dejes de Querer"	Best Music Video	Won	
Latin Grammy Awards	2000	"No Me Dejes de Querer"	Best Tropical Song	Nominated	
Latin Grammy Awards	2000	"Santo Santo" (Só Pra Contrariar featuring Gloria Estefan)	Best Performance by a Duo or Group with Vocal	Nominated	
Latin Grammy Awards	2008	90 Millas	Best Traditional Tropical Album	Won	
Latin Grammy Awards	2008	"Píntame De Colores"	Best Tropical Song	Won	
Latin Grammy Awards	2008	"90 Millas"	Best Long Form Music Video	Nominated	
Latin Grammy Awards	2021	Brazil305	Best Contemporany Tropical/Tropical Fusion Album	Won	
Latin Recording Academy	2008	Gloria Estefan	Person of the Year	Won	
La Musa Awards	2024	"Conga"	Song of All Time Award	Honoree	
Library of Congress	2019	Gloria Estefan & Emilio	Gershwin Prize for Popular Song	Honoree	
Lo Nuestro Awards	1989	Gloria Estefan	Crossover Artist of the Year	Won	
Lo Nuestro Awards	1991	Gloria Estefan	Pop Female Artist of the Year	Nominated	
Lo Nuestro Awards	1992	Gloria Estefan	Excellence Award	Honoree	
Lo Nuestro Awards	1994	Gloria Estefan	Pop Female Artist of the Year	Won	
Lo Nuestro Awards	1994	Gloria Estefan	Tropical Female Artist of the Year	Won	
Lo Nuestro Awards	1994	Mi Tierra	Tropical Album of the Year	Won	
Lo Nuestro Awards	1994	"Con Los Años Que Me Quedan"	Pop Song of the Year	Nominated	
Lo Nuestro Awards	1995	Gloria Estefan	Female Artist of the Year, Pop	Nominated	
Lo Nuestro Awards	1995	Gloria Estefan	Female Artist of the Year, Tropical/Salsa	Nominated	
Lo Nuestro Awards	1996	Gloria Estefan	Pop Female Artist of the Year	Won	
Lo Nuestro Awards	1996	Gloria Estefan	Female Artist of the Year, Tropical/Salsa	Won	
Lo Nuestro Awards	1996	"Abriendo Puertas"	Tropical/Salsa Song of the Year	Won	
Lo Nuestro Awards	1996	Abriendo Puertas	Tropical/Salsa Album of the Year	Won	
Lo Nuestro Awards	1998	Gloria Estefan & Alejandro Fernández	Pop Group of the Year	Nominated	
Lo Nuestro Awards	1999	Gloria Estefan	Female Artist of the Year, Pop	Nominated	
Lo Nuestro Awards	2001	Gloria Estefan	Tropical Female Artist	Nominated	
Lo Nuestro Awards	2001	Gloria Estefan	Traditional Performance	Nominated	
Lo Nuestro Awards	2001	Alma Caribeña	Pop Album of the Year	Nominated	
Lo Nuestro Awards	2004	"Hoy"	Video of the Year	Nominated	
Lo Nuestro Awards	2005	Gloria Estefan	Female Artist of the Year	Nominated	
Lo Nuestro Awards	2008	Gloria Estefan	Female Artist of the Year	Nominated	
Lo Nuestro Awards	2009	Gloria Estefan	Female Artist of the Year	Nominated	
Lo Nuestro Awards	2018	Gloria Estefan & Emilio	Excellence Award	Honoree	
Magic 106	2004	Gloria Estefan & Emilio	Exceptional Woman of the Year Award	Honoree	
Martín Fierro Awards	2024	Gloria Estefan & Emilio	Artistic Excellence and Cultural Contribution Award	Honoree	
Maestro Cares Foundation	2022	Gloria Estefan & Emilio	Community Hero Award	Honoree	
Meridian International Center	2024	Gloria Estefan	Meridian Cultural Diplomacy Awards	Honoree	
Miami carnival	1988	Gloria Estefan	Festival Queen	Honoree	
Miami Caribbean American Movers and Shakers	2014	Gloria Estefan & Emilio	Lifetime Achievement Award	Honoree	
MTV Video Music Awards	1990	"Oye Mi Canto"	International Viewers' Choice: MTV Europe	Won	
Music Business Association	2000	Gloria Estefan	Harry Chapin Memorial Humanitarian Award	Honoree	
MusiCares	1994	Gloria Estefan	Person of the Year	Won	
MusiCares	2001	Gloria Estefan	Person of the Year	Won	
NARM Best-Sellers Awards	1994	Mi Tierra	Best-Selling Latin Recording	Won	
National LGBTQ Task Force	2017	Gloria Estefan	National Leadership Award	Honoree	
National Music Foundation	1993	Gloria Estefan & Emilio	Humanitarian of the Year	Won	
National Recording Registry	2018	"Rhythm Is Gonna Get You"	Preserved	Honoree	
National Recording Registry	2024	"Conga"	Preservation	Nominated	
New York Festivals	2000	"Don't Stop"	World Medal Award: Film & Video Media	Won	
New York Women in Film & Television	2019	Gloria Estefan	Muse Award	Honoree	
NCLR Bravo Awards	1988	Gloria Estefan	Best Female Artist	Nominated	
NCLR Bravo Awards	1990	Gloria Estefan	Crossover Singer of the Year	Won	
NCLR Bravo Awards	1996	The Evolution Tour Live in Miami	Outstanding Comedy, Variety or Musical Special Program	Won	
NCLR Bravo Awards	1996	The Evolution Tour Live in Miami	Outstanding Female Performance in Variety or Musical Special	Won	
Onda Cero Awards	1993	Gloria Estefan	Best Latin Artist	Won	
Onda Cero Awards	1993	"Mi Tierra"	Best Song	Won	
Orgullosamente Latino Award	2005	Gloria Estefan	Latin Lifetime Award	Honoree	
Outshine Film Festival	2017	Gloria Estefan & Emilio for A Change of Heart	Ally Award	Won	
People en Español Awards	2013	Gloria Estefan	Female Artist of the Year	Nominated	
Pepperdine University Hispanic Council	2005	Gloria Estefan & Emilio	American Spirit Awards	Honoree	
Performance Magazine Reader's Poll Award	1988	Gloria Estefan	Female Vocalist of the Year	Won	
PNC Financial Services	2023	Gloria Estefan	Common Wealth Award of Distinguished Service	Honoree	
Premios Amigo	1997	Gloria Estefan	Best Latin Female Artist	Won	
Premios Amigo	1997	Abriendo Puertas	Best Latin Album	Won	
Premios Amigo	1998	Gloria Estefan	Best Latin Female Artist	Won	
Premios Amigo	2000	Gloria Estefan	Best Latin Female Artist	Won	
Premios Dial	2008	Gloria Estefan	Most Valued Artists by The Spanish-speaking Public	Won	
Premios de la Música	1997	Gloria Estefan	Latino Award	Honoree	
Premios Gardel	1999	Gloria Estefan	Best Female Artist	Nominated	
Premios Gardel	2001	Gloria Estefan	Best Female Latino Singer	Nominated	
Premios Juventud	2004	Gloria Estefan	She's Totally Red Carpet	Nominated	
Premios Ondas	1993	"Mi Tierra"	Best Song	Won	
Premios Ondas	1993	Gloria Estefan	Most Popular Artist in Spain	Won	
Premios Ondas	1995	Gloria Estefan	Best Latin Artist	Won	
Premios Ondas	2013	Gloria Estefan	Music Special Award	Honoree	
Premios Radio y Televisión	2001	Gloria Estefan	Gold Award	Nominated	
Premios Ronda	1994	Gloria Estefan	Best-Selling International Album	Nominated	
Premios Ronda	1994	Gloria Estefan	Best International Artist	Nominated	
Private 100 Dinner	2023	Gloria Estefan & Emilio	Community Impact Award	Honoree	
Queen Sofía Spanish Institute	2023	Gloria Estefan	Sophia Award for Excellence	Honoree	
Recording Industry Association of America (RIAA) Honors	2023	Gloria Estefan	Icon Award	Honoree	
Ronald McDonald Children's Charities (RMCC) of South Florida	1991	Gloria Estefan	Spirit of Love Award	Honoree	
Ritmo Latino Awards (Note: Also known as "Premio de la Gente" or Latin Music Fan Awards.)	2000	Gloria Estefan	Best Salsa Artist	Nominated	
Ritmo Latino Awards	2004	Gloria Estefan	Best Video Artist	Nominated	
Smithsonian Institution	2014	Gloria Estefan	James Smithson Bicentennial Medal	Honoree	
Songwriters Hall of Fame Special Awards	1996	Gloria Estefan	Howie Richmond Hitmaker Award	Honoree	
Songwriters Hall of Fame Special Awards	2001	Gloria Estefan & Emilio	Sammy Cahn Lifetime Achievement Award	Honoree	
SoundExchange	2023	Gloria Estefan	Music Fairness Award	Honoree	
St. Jude Children's Research Hospital	2008	Gloria Estefan & Emilio	Children Humanitarian Award	Honoree	
Todo Miami Magazine	1989	Gloria Estefan & Emilio	Mr. & Mrs. Television	Honoree	
The Buoniconti Fund	2003	Gloria Estefan	Humanitarian Award	Honoree	
The Buoniconti Fund	2016	Gloria Estefan & Emilio	Outstanding Philanthropist Award	Honoree	
United States Hispanic Chamber of Commerce (USHCC)	2011	Gloria Estefan	Ultimate Latina	Honoree	
United States Hispanic Chamber of Commerce (USHCC)	2016	Gloria Estefan & Emilio	Mexican Ohtli Award	Honoree	
University of Miami	2014	Gloria Estefan	Iron Arrow Honor Society	Honoree	
United Way of Dade County	1993	Gloria Estefan	Alexis de Tocqueville Award for Outstanding Philanthropy	Honoree	
Vanidades	2010	Gloria Estefan	Most Influential Latina Woman	Honoree	
Variety's Miami Entertainment Town Gala	2022	Gloria Estefan & Emilio	The Legends Awards	Honoree	
Variety's Miami Entertainment Town Gala	2022	Gloria Estefan & Emilio	Groundbreakers Award	Won	
Women in Film & Television San Antonio	2024	Gloria Estefan	The Celestial Awards	Honoree	
World Music Awards	1994	Gloria Estefan	Best-Selling Latino Artist	Won	

== Other honors ==
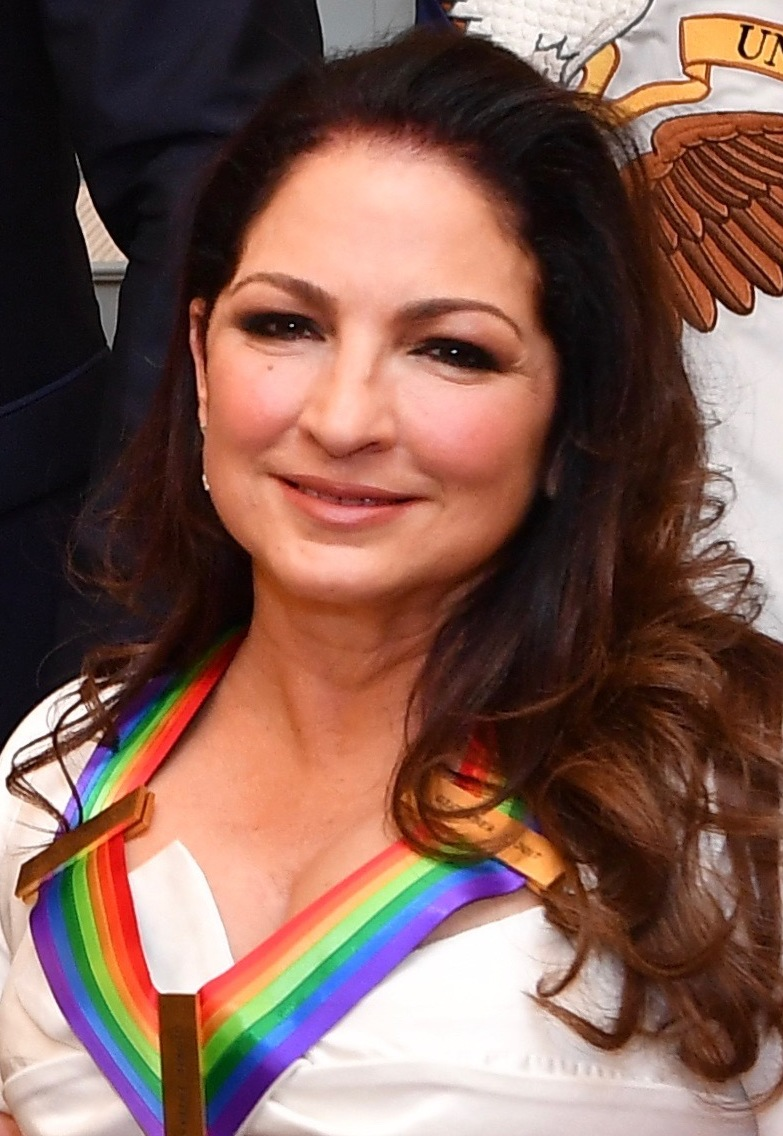
Estefan among the 2017 Kennedy Center Honorees by then U.S. president Barack Obama

List of state honors
Country	City/Gov./Entity	Year	Description	Status	Ref.
United States	Conference of Mayors	2005	National Artistic Achievement Award	Honoree	
Panama	City of Panama/Mayor Juan Carlos Navarro	2006	Keys to the City	Honoree	
United States	City of Las Vegas/Mayor Oscar Goodman	2010	Keys to the City	Honoree	
United States	President Barack Obama	2015	Presidential Medal of Freedom	Honoree	
United States/Spain	Spanish Chamber of Commerce in the United States	2015	Ponce de León Award	Honoree	
Spain	Ministry of Culture	2018	Gold Medal of Merit in the Fine Arts	Honoree	
United States	Miami Beach County	2019	Keys to the City	Honoree	
United States	City of Miami		Keys to the City	Honoree	

List of academic honors
University	Year	Description	Status	Ref.
University of Miami	1993	Honorary Doctoral degree in Music	Honoree	
Barry University	2002	Honorary Law degree	Honoree	
Berklee College of Music	2007	Honorary Doctor of Music	Honoree	
University School of Music	2017	Honorary Sigma Alpha Iota Member	Honoree	

List of Walk of Fame/Hall of Fames for Gloria Estefan
Walk/Hall of Fame	Year	Description	Status	Ref.
Little Havana/Calle 8 Walk of Fame	1989	Walk of Star	Won	
Amsterdam Walk of Stars	1989	Footprints	Won	
Movieland Star Hall of Fame	1991	Hall of Fame inductee	Inducted	
Hollywood Walk of Fame	1993	Walk of Star	Won	
VH1 Hall of Fame	1993	"Live for Loving You"	Inducted	
National Academy of Popular Music Hall of Fame	1996	Hall of Fame inductee	Inducted	
International Women's Forum Hall of Fame	2000	Hall of Fame inductee	Inducted	
Florida Women's Hall of Fame	2003	Hall of Fame inductee	Inducted	
Hollywood Bowl Hall of Fame	2011	Hall of Fame inductee	Inducted	
Miami Children's Hospital Pediatric Hall of Fame	2011	Hall of Fame inductee	Inducted	
Latin Songwriters Hall of Fame	2014	Hall of Fame inductee	Inducted	
Goldmine Hall of Fame	2017	Hall of Fame inductee	Inducted	
Miami Beach Hall of Fame	2019	Hall of Fame inductee	Inducted	
Songwriters Hall of Fame	2023	Hall of Fame inductee	Inducted	

== Gloria Estefan & Miami Sound Machine ==
They were the first to receive a Latin Stars Walk of Fame in Miami (1989).

The band received their first major award as the Favorite Pop/Rock Band/Duo/Group in the American Music Awards of 1989. They became the 27th act to receive the Crystal Globe Award established in 1974 for acts selling 5 million albums outside of their country of origin.

Award/organization	Year	Nominee/work	Category	Result	Ref.
American Music Awards	1989	Gloria Estefan & Miami Sound Machine	Favorite Pop/Rock Band/Duo/Group	Won	
Amauta de Oro (Peru)	1986	Gloria Estefan & Miami Sound Machine	Most Popular International Artist	Won	
Association of Latin Entertainment Critics (Latin ACE, New York)	1985	Miami Sound Machine	Orchestra of the Year	Nominated	
Billboard Number One Awards	1977	"Renacer"	Latin Pop National	Nominated	
Billboard Number One Awards	1977	"Renacer"	Miami Pop	Nominated	
Billboard Number One Awards	1986	Gloria Estefan & Miami Sound Machine	Top New Artists	Won	
Billboard Number One Awards	1986	Gloria Estefan & Miami Sound Machine	Top Dance Sales Artist	Nominated	
Billboard Number One Awards	1986	Gloria Estefan & Miami Sound Machine	Top Pop Latin Artist	Nominated	
Billboard Number One Awards	1986	Primitive Love	Top Pop Album	Nominated	
Billboard Number One Awards	1986	Primitive Love	Top Pop Latin Album	Nominated	
Billboard Number One Awards	1986	"Words Get in the Way"	Top Pop Single	Nominated	
Billboard Number One Awards	1987	Gloria Estefan & Miami Sound Machine	Top Pop Singles Artists Duos/Group	Nominated	
Billboard Number One Awards	1987	Gloria Estefan & Miami Sound Machine	Top Pop Album Artist	Nominated	
Billboard Number One Awards	1987	Gloria Estefan & Miami Sound Machine	Top Pop Singles Artist	Nominated	
Billboard Number One Awards	1987	Gloria Estefan & Miami Sound Machine	Top Pop Artists — Combined Singles and Albums	Nominated	
Billboard Number One Awards	1987	Let It Loose	Top Pop Album	Nominated	
Billboard Number One Awards	1988	Gloria Estefan & Miami Sound Machine	Top Adult Contemporary Artist	Nominated	
Billboard Number One Awards	1988	Gloria Estefan & Miami Sound Machine	Top Hot Crossover Artist	Nominated	
Billboard Number One Awards	1988	Gloria Estefan & Miami Sound Machine	Top Pop Crossover Group	Won	
Billboard Number One Awards	1988	"Can't Stay Away from You"	Top Adult Contemporary Single	Won	
Billboard Number One Awards	1988	"Anything for You"	Top Adult Contemporary Single	Nominated	
CableACE Award	1990	Gloria Estefan & Miami Sound Machine Showtime	Best Music Special	Won	
CableACE Award	1990	Gloria Estefan & Miami Sound Machine Showtime	Best Editing	Won	
CableACE Award	1990	Gloria Estefan & Miami Sound Machine Showtime	Best Direction	Won	
CBS International	1990	Gloria Estefan & Miami Sound Machine	Crystal Globe Awards	Won	
Grammy Awards	1989	"Anything for You"	Best Pop Performance by a Duo or Group with Vocals	Nominated	
Latin Stars Walk of Fame	1989	Gloria Estefan & Miami Sound Machine	Miami Walk of Stars	Inducted	
Lo Nuestro Awards	1989	Gloria Estefan & Miami Sound Machine	Pop Group or Duo of the Year	Won	
NCLR Bravo Awards	1988	Gloria Estefan & Miami Sound Machine	Best Duo or Group Pop/Rock	Nominated	
Tokyo Music Fair	1986	"Conga"	Contest Winner	Won	
Pollstar Awards	1991	Gloria Estefan & Miami Sound Machine	Most Creative Stage Production	Nominated	

== See also ==
- On Your Feet!
