= Wepa =

Single by Gloria Estefan

from the album Miss Little Havana
- Released: July 24, 2011
- Recorded: 2010
- Studio: Crescent Moon Studios (Miami, Florida)
- Genre: Dance-pop; latin house; merengue; Hi-NRG
- Length: 3:57
- Label: Crescent Moon Records; Verve Forecast Records
- Songwriters: Pharrell Williams; Gloria Estefan; Emilio Estefan Jr.
- Producers: Pharrell Williams; Emilio Estefan Jr.

Gloria Estefan singles chronology
"Somos El Mundo" (2010)	"Wepa" (2011)	"Hotel Nacional" (2011)

"Wepa" is a song recorded by Cuban-American singer Gloria Estefan for her twelfth studio album, Miss Little Havana. The song was written by Gloria Estefan and her husband, Emilio Estefan Jr. and by American producer and musician Pharrell Williams, while production was credited to Estefan Jr. and Williams. The single was released by Verve Forecast Records on July 24, 2011, digitally worldwide as the lead single from Miss Little Havana.

Backed by strong synthesizers, "Wepa" is a dance-pop song with strong elements of latin house music, merengue rhythms, and a bit of Hi-NRG. Upon its release, the song received favorable reviews, praising her connection with the early records with the Miami Sound Machine dance numbers.

Commercially, the single was a success, becoming Estefan's sixth number-one song on the "Hot Dance Club Songs" chart, being her twenty-third entry on the chart since she began with her first dance-hit "Dr. Beat" back in 1984. An accompanying music video was premiered to support the single; the song was also remixed to fit different formats, including several remixes done by global DJs such as Ralphi Rosario, Chuckie and R3hab, who featured a special collaboration with rapper Pitbull.

In Puerto Rican Spanish, Wepa is a versatile slang interjection that likely originates as an imitation of the English "Woo-hoo!". The term rose to prominence in Puerto Rico thanks to the 1974 song "El Jolgorio (Wepa Wepa Wepa)" by Puerto Rican Salsa musician Alfonso Vélez.

== Background ==
On April 7, 2011 Gloria Estefan announced via Twitter that she was recording new English-language material made by The Neptunes' producer, Pharrell Williams, who had also worked before with other major artists including Britney Spears, Shakira, and Madonna. Gloria said that Williams called her telling he wanted to record something together, wanting to show a couple of songs he would like to show her. Both were enthusiastic, and that was the main reason they worked together on nine songs for the album.

== Distribution ==
This single became her first commercial release to the English market since "I Wish You" back in 2003 for her previous English album, Unwrapped. The song announced as the lead single of the new album, which consists principally of dance music and Latin rhythms, was returning to Estefan's career beginning. The song is basically a preview of what the album includes as the fresh new image Estefan wanted to show in this new era of her career and the return to the dance market, which is one of the main markets. Estefan first started out with the Miami Sound Machine; her last dance project was made for her 1998 album Gloria!

A Spanglish-language version of the song was also distributed, especially to Hispanic radio stations in the United States to make more promotion for the album, however this version featured only a few lines in the Spanish language, mostly because the original version of the song features a line completely sung in Spanish: "Había una chinita sentada en un café" / "con sus dos zapatos blancos" / "y las medias al revés".

== Composition ==
The song in the making was inspired principally by Estefan's music from her early career with the Miami Sound Machine including "merengue beats mixed with Pharrell's urban sound". This was noted by Estefan in an interview, where she stated that recording dance music was an easy issue for her, mostly because it was the core of her career. She also noted that "Wepa" does not have a literal translation; it was just an expression like "wow" or "hey", which is used mostly by Puerto Ricans and Colombians.

== Critical reception ==
"Wepa" has received mixed reception from music critics; among those favorable, Estefan has been compared to sound similar to Ke$ha, as Eliot Glazer from BestWeekEverTV.com reviewed the song: "it sounds like a hyperactive dance march that borrows as equally from Ke$ha — the Kween of Tra$hpop — as it does from Celia Cruz and Tito Puente. Although it doesn't necessarily sound like her voice was Auto-Tuned, there is an element of robotic call-and-response that one would more likely expect from, say, The Black Eyed Peas. Basically, Gloria Estefan wants to sit at the kids table, and that is FINE!"

Not being Estefan's first collaboration with Cuban rapper Pitbull, they worked together on "No Llores"; a remix made by R3hab was released for further promotion of the single. This version of the song gained positive reception by Sadao Turner on Ryan Seacrest's website, claiming it was "destiny" that brought the duo together. However, there were some negative reviews, as Romeo's Corner said: "I can't help but to think of Jennifer Lopez' "On The Floor" when I listen to it. Gloria Estefan's vocals on the track sound out of place and uninspired".

== Chart performance ==
The song was sent first to clubs and dance stations where it received a lot of rotation, becoming Estefan's twenty-third song to enter the "Hot Dance Club Songs" since "Dr. Beat" entered twenty-seven years before, and turned into her sixth number-one song on the same chart, She recorded a video thanking DJs across the United States for their support at clubs with this single on her YouTube account. Despite its dance success, the song didn't chart on the Billboard Hot 100 chart.

A Spanish version of the song, released to Latin radio stations, has been surfacing and after frequently moderated airplay, the song made its debut at the "Top Tropical Songs" at number thirteen, staying one week at that position, getting low for the next and returning in the third week for the same position. For the last week of September, the song went onto the Top placing it at a Top Ten hit peaking at number three. The song also peaked at number twenty-eight on the "Hot Latin Songs" chart.

== Music video ==
"The "Wepa" video is wild! I dedicated it to the people who work hard to make life easier for all of us. We've all been there at some point, you're not going to have any more fun [on the dance floor] whether you have five bucks or a billion. Music belongs to the people".

— Gloria Estefan talking about the music video

A music video was made to give further promotion to the song. It was directed by Norwegian director Ray Kay and officially premiered on 28 September 2011. A short-form video promoting the Miami Heat basketball team had been streaming on music video channels even before the song was released officially, but at Estefan's official website featured a live behind-the-scenes video that showed there was an official video in the making.

Critical reception about the music video was positive. Cindy Rodriguez from Huffington Post stated: "the "WEPA" music video is filled to the brim with energy, color, and dance numbers. The gorgeous 54-year-old doesn't let the young dancers leave her behind either – Estefan busts out her own moves as well. We absolutely love the song here at Latina!".

== Promotion ==
The song was initially promoted through clubs and dance radio stations; at the same time, prior to its official release, a music video featuring Estefan and the Miami Heat basketball team was launched on music video channels. Although it is not the official music video, it has been supporting the spread of the song while she is promoting the song as the lead single for the album.

Estefan gave her first live appearance with the song when she sang at the 2011 Alma Awards. She then appeared at The View, then made a brief appearance at The Rosie Show at OWN Network and finished as the musical guest for The Tonight Show with Jay Leno singing the song. She was also scheduled to appear on the program Dancing With The Stars, but the performance was never done. She made another appearance at the Univision special "Nuestra Navidad 2011", and an international feature of the song was done when she performed a medley of "Tres Deseos" and "Wepa" at the first season of La Voz... México.

== Formats and track listings ==
These are the formats and track listings of major single releases of "Wepa":

U.S. Digital EP

1. "Wepa" (Original version)
2. "Wepa" (Spanish version)
3. "Wepa" (Ralphi Rosario club remix)
4. "Wepa" (DJ Africa remix)
5. "Wepa" (Keisha Mai Ash & Tony Mardini beat is on mix)
6. "Wepa" (Emilio Estefan & Tony Mardini South Beach mix)

== Credits and personnel ==
- Gloria M. Estefan – writer, vocals and pre-mixing
- Emilio Estefan Jr. – writer and record producer
- Pharrell Williams - writer and record producer
- Edwin Bonilla – percussion
- Archie Peña - percussion
- Marco Linares – guitar
- Andrew Coleman – recording engineers
- Danny Ponce, Rene Toledo Jr, Phil Seaford - assisting recording engineers
- Serban Ghenea - mixing
- John Hanes - assisting mixing
- Andrew Coleman - pre-mixing
- Recorded at Crescent Moon Studios, Miami, Florida.

Credits adapted from the liner notes of the Miss Little Havana and "Wepa" CD single.

== Charts ==
=== Weekly charts ===
Chart (2011)	Peak position
Brazil Top 30 Dance/Club Play	5
Mexico Billboard Pop Español Airplay	47
US Billboard Hot Dance Club Songs	1
US Billboard Hot Latin Songs	28
US Billboard Tropical Songs	3

=== Year-end charts ===
Chart (2011)	Position
US Hot Dance Club Songs (Billboard)	38

== Official versions ==
Original versions

- Album version — 3:58
- Spanish version — 3:58

Official remixes

- Ralphi Rosario Club Mix — 7:35
- Ralphi Rosario Dub — 7:35
- Ralphi Rosario Radio Edit — 3:28
- Ralphi Rosario Spanish Club Mix — 7:35
- Ralphi Rosario Spanish Radio Edit — 3:28
- DJ Africa Remix — 4:31
- DJ Africa & Motiff Spanish Radio Mix — 3:05
- Keisha Mai Ash & Tony Mardini Beat Is On Mix — 5:00
- Emilio Estefan & Tony Mardini South Beach Mix — 5:30
- Emilio Estefan Comparsa Remix — 5:50
- Emilio Estefan Comparsa's Spanish Radio Edit — 3:42
- UK Radio Edit — 3:53
- Klubjumpers Extended Mix — 5:52
- Klubjumpers Dub — 5:51
- Klubjumpers Radio Mix — 3:54
- Pablo Flores Club Mix — 8:00
- Pablo Flores English Radio Mix Edit — 3:55
- Pablo Flores English Radio Mix Edit #1 (No French) — 4:01
- Pablo Flores English Radio Mix Edit #2 (No French) — 3:40
- Pablo Flores Spanish Club Mix — 8:00
- Pablo Flores Spanish Radio Mix Edit — 3:55
- Martorano vs. Flores Mixshow Edit — 5:50
- Rosabel Attitude Club Mix — 8:19
- Rosabel Attitude Club Edit — 7:23
- Rosabel Attitude Dub — 8:05
- Rosabel Attitude Radio Edit — 3:51
- Rosabel Dub Pass 2 — 8:06
- Gustavo Scorpio Club Mix — 7:49
- Gustavo Scorpio Dub Mix — 5:32
- R3hab Vocal Remix — 4:20
- R3hab Dub — 4:18
- R3hab Remix Edit — 3:24
- R3hab Remix — 3:28 (Featuring Pitbull)
- Dada Club Mix — 4:42
- DJ Chuckie Surinam Club Remix — 5:10
- DJ Chuckie Surinam Radio Mix — 3:48
- DJ Chuckie Surinam Radio Dub
- DJ Yiannis Subelo' Club Mix — 7:28
- DJ Yiannis Subelo' Dub
- DJ Yiannis Subelo' Radio Edit — 3:50
- Cesar Vilo Hot-Rhythm Remix
- Otto von Schirach Remix
- Hildward Croes Soca Dushi Remix — 5:08

== Release history ==
Region	Date	Format
Worldwide	July 24, 2011	Digital download
