= Me Odio =

2007 single by Gloria Estefan

Single by Gloria Estefan

from the album 90 Millas
- Released: November 2, 2007
- Recorded: 2006: Miami, United States
- Studio: Crescent Moon Studios
- Genre: Salsa
- Length: 3:15
- Label: Burgundy Records; Sony BMG
- Songwriters: Gloria Estefan; Emilio Estefan Jr.; Alberto Gaitan; Ricardo Gaitan
- Producers: Emilio Estefan Jr.; Alberto Gaitan; Ricardo Gaitan

Gloria Estefan singles chronology
"No Llores" (2007)	"Me Odio" (2007)	"Píntame De Colores" (2007)

"Me Odio" ("I Hate Myself") is a song recorded by the Cuban-American singer Gloria Estefan for her fourth Spanish-language and eleventh studio album, 90 Millas. The song was written by Gloria Estefan and her husband, Emilio Estefan Jr. and Gaitanes (Alberto y Ricardo Gaitan), while production was credited to Estefan Jr. and Gaitanes. The single was released digitally worldwide by Sony BMG on November 2, 2007, as the second and first promotional-only single from 90 Millas.

As its predecessor, the song is a danzón that mixes a powerful guitar and trumpet introduction with a salsa background driven by a piano throughout the song. The lyrics make reference to a person "who hates itself for being so in love with someone", but some music critics suggested it may not refer to a person specifically, but to a place. Estefan confirmed in her documentary, 90 Millas, that it is one of her favorite songs from the album.

Although a music video was filmed and the song received remix treatment, including a duet featuring the rapper Fat Joe, the song could not match the success of "No Llores", and was only released to promote the album on the US on Spanish-language radio-stations.

== Distribution ==
The single was not commercially available except through digital download music retailers. However, a promotional single was issued to be promoted on Hispanic radio-stations in the United States on November 2, 2007. This promotional single included two different remixes from the song to fit different formats.

One of the remixes was completely in salsa, as she likes to turn most of her songs. A hip-hop remix was done, featuring the American rapper Fat Joe, most likely to suit urban and Latin rhythm radio stations.

== Chart performance ==
This single was released only in the United States which was the only country where the song charted, peaking at number 37 on the Hot Latin Songs charts. Because of the remixes, it was able to chart in other formats, peaking at number 20 on the Billboard Hot Latin Tropical/Salsa Airplay chart and 21 at the Billboard Latin Regional Mexican Airplay chart. The song also entered the Radio & Records Tropical National Airplay chart, peaking at number 20.

== Music video ==
A music video was filmed for the song was taken from a special free concert she gave at Plaza de Toros Las Ventas in Madrid, Spain, to promote the album as part of her "promotional tour" around the world. The video shows Estefan wearing a Panama hat singing to the audience with stills from the concert. It was the second music video from this album.

== Formats and track listings ==
- US Promotional Single
1. "Me Odio" – 3:15
2. "Me Odio" (Salsa Remix) – 2:58
3. "Me Odio" (Featuring Fat Joe) [Hip-Hop Remix] – 3:17

== Credits and personnel ==
- Gloria M. Estefan – writer, vocals and mixing
- Emilio Estefan Jr. – writer, record producer and mixing
- Alberto Gaitan – writer, record producer, background vocals and maracas
- Ricardo Gaitan – writer, record producer, background vocals and maracas
- Cheito Quiñonez - background vocals
- Alfredo "Chocolate" Armenteros - trumpet
- Javier Concepción – piano
- Marco Linares – guitar
- Jesús Cruz – laúd
- Sal Cuevas – bass
- Edwin Bonilla – minor percussion, congas and bongos
- Braily Ramos – trombones
- Danny Ponce & Mike Couzzi – tracking engineers
- Eric Schilling - mixing
- Recorded at Crescent Moon Studios, Miami, Florida.

Credits adapted from the liner notes of the 90 Millas CD and "Me Odio" promotional CD single.

== Charts ==
=== Weekly charts ===
Chart (2007)	Peak position
US Billboard Hot Latin Songs	37
US Billboard Hot Latin Tropical/Salsa Airplay	20
US Billboard Latin Regional Mexican Airplay	21
US Radio & Records National Tropical Airplay	20

== Official versions ==
Original versions

- Album version — 3:15

Remixes

- Salsa remix — 2:58
- Hip-Hop remix — 3:17 (featuring Fat Joe)

== Release history ==
Country	Date	Format	Label
United States	November 2, 2007	Promotional single	Burgundy Records, Sony BMG
