= Mirella Cesa =

Ecuadorian singer

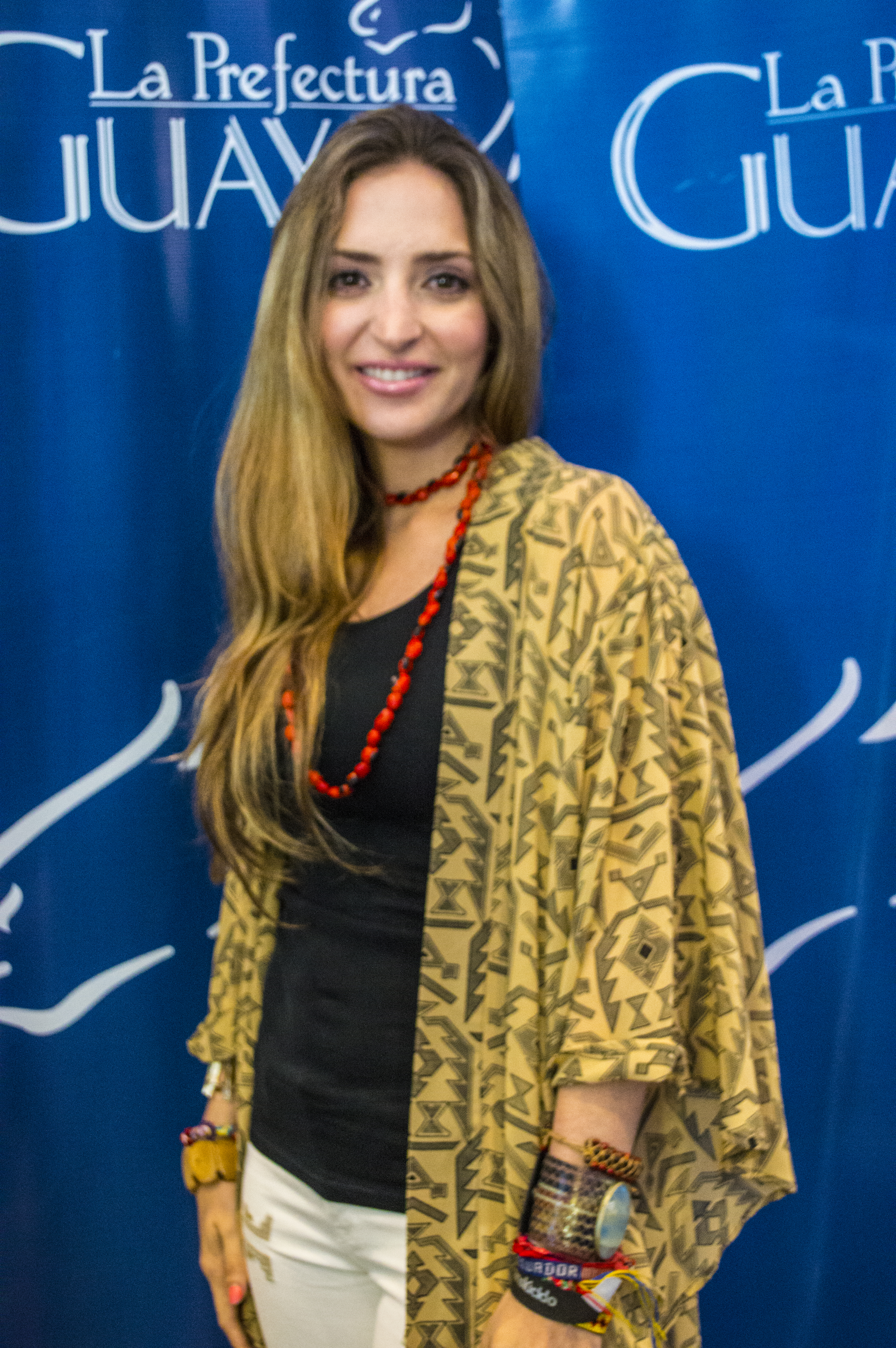

Background information
- Also known as: Mirella Cesa
- Born: December 18, 1984 (age 41); Guayaquil, Ecuador
- Origin: Guayaquil, Ecuador
- Genres: Pop, Andipop
- Occupations: Singer, songwriter
- Instruments: Vocal, Guitar
- Years active: 2006–present
- Website: http://www.mirellacesa.com

Mirella Cesa (born December 18, 1984, in Guayaquil) is an Ecuadorian singer who has won several awards and been called the "mother of Andipop" (Andean pop music).

== Early life ==
When Mirella was young, she would visit her aunt who would play music by Armando Manzanero, Leo Dan, Ana Belén, Vikki Carr, among others. She was considered an "old" young person, because she liked to listen to meaningful "grown up" music. She began singing at the gatherings of her friends and family, church, and parties. She then began guitar lessons to supplement her songwriting and singing. One day after graduating from high school, she traveled to Miami to seek musical opportunities. She then met the successful producer Rudy Pérez, and soon after began recording her first album. From among 80 of her own songs, she selected 13 of the best ones, and out of these only 8 made it to the album, as well as songs by Rudy Pérez, Mario Patiño, Ernesto Alejandro Patiño, and Alejando Sabre. Mirella mixes Andean music with pop. Her musical instrument is the charango, an indigenous instrument that sounds like a harp and has the characteristics of a guitar.

== Career ==
Internationally, she was the first female artist to win the award for the "Los 40 Principales" in Spain representing Ecuador, nominated for 2014 MTV Europe Music Awards Latin America for Best Artist Central. She has participated in the Telethon 20 30 Panama three times, being, in one of these, co-author of the opening song. In 2012, she was the opening act of the show of Elton John, this year she was invited to the Telethon of El Salvador. In Colombia, it was among the 21 unique chain R. time with her single "Darte Mi Amor" in the Venezuelan market, the singles "Deseo Concedido" and "Corazon Abierto" entered the TOP Latino Record Report. She has also toured promotional in El Salvador, Costa Rica and major cities in the USA.

Her videos have rotated music channels since 2010, as HTV, MTV, music Argentina Q, K Music Bogotá. The Proudly Latin Awards 2010 (Mexican chain are Ritmo Latino), the nominated in four categories. Currently, she nominated for the first installment of the Heat Latin music awards in the best new artist category.

A duet sung with artists like Franco de Vita, Carlos Baute, Armando Manzanero and Axel as part of their tours in Ecuador, as well as with Álvaro Torres and Gaitanes in his last album Deseo Concedido.

== UNICEF ==
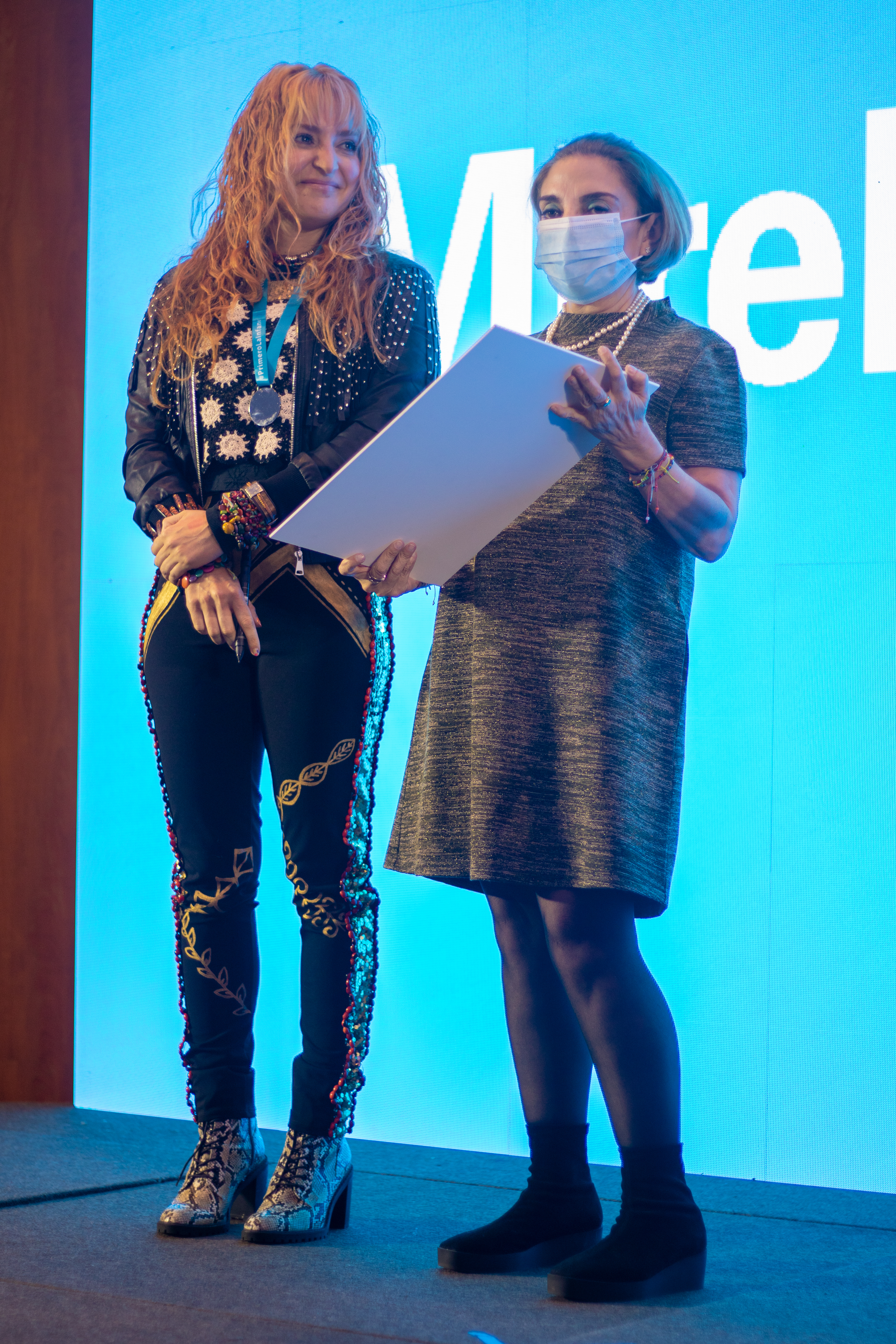
Luz Ángela Melo with Luz Ángela Melo CEO of UNICEF Ecuador in 2022

Cesa was appointed as an ambassador for UNICEF in Ecuador by their CEO Luz Ángela Melo after several informal contributions of her support in December 2022.

== Discography ==
=== Albums ===
- Mirella Cesa (2006)
- Dejate Llevar (2010)
- Deseo Concedido (2013)
- La Buena Fortuna (2016)
- Arcoiris (2018)
- La Quinceañera (2022)

=== Singles ===
- El Amor Es
- Este Amor
- 9 Meses
- No Seré Para Ti
- Manantial de Caricias
- Juego de Tres
- Digan Lo Que Digan
- La Pregunta De Cajón
- Eclipse
- Deseo Concedido
- Darte Mi Amor
- Te Confieso
- Navidad Como en Casa
- Corazon Abierto
- La Buena Fortuna (feat. Papayo)
- Se Acabo El Amor
- A Besos (Feat. Sie7e Urban & Acoustic Version)
- Somos
- La Corriente
- En Ti
- Respira (with Mr. Pauer)
- No Amanece (with Helian Evans)
- Vaivén
- Una Vez Mas (with Pamela Cortes )
- Linda Despedida
- El Tesoro
- Mi Puerto
- Cuando Me Miras
- Locura
- Dejarme Querer

== Awards ==
- 2009 Best Artist, Ecuador – Los 40 Principales
- 2010 Best Artist with International Projection – MBN Ecuador
