= Píntame De Colores =

Single by Gloria Estefan

from the album 90 Millas
- Released: February 2008
- Recorded: 2006
- Studio: Crescent Moon Studios, Miami
- Genre: Salsa
- Length: 3:32
- Label: Burgundy Records; Sony BMG
- Songwriters: Gloria M. Estefan; Emilio Estefan; Alberto Gaitan; Ricardo Gaitan
- Producers: Emilio Estefan; Alberto Gaitan; Ricardo Gaitan

Gloria Estefan singles chronology
"Me Odio" (2007)	"Píntame De Colores" (2008)	"Somos El Mundo" (2010)

Alternative cover
- Cover Dutch Promo CD

"Píntame De Colores" (Paint Me In Colors) is a song recorded by Cuban-American singer Gloria Estefan for her fourth Spanish-language and eleventh studio album, 90 Millas. The song was written by Gloria Estefan and her husband, Emilio Estefan Jr. and Gaitanes (Alberto y Ricardo Gaitan) and production was credited to Estefan Jr. and Gaitanes. The single was released by Sony BMG in November 2007 digitally as first promotional-only single from 90 Millas to Europe and third overall single to the United States.

With more a tropical feeling mixed with salsa music, this song was completely different from Gloria's previous two singles. The single was first released exclusively in Europe, but later was released at the United States in February 2008 as a promotional single to Spanish-language radio stations.

== Distribution ==
This single was exclusively released at Europe in November 2007 while "Me Odio" was released only to the United States, this single was especially targeted for The Netherlands, where the album 90 Millas, become in the most-successful Spanish album ever released, managing to reach the top spot of the albums chart.

While initial promotion was only to Europe, the single was released to the United States, but no remixes were officially done, and was sent only the album version to Hispanic radio-stations. No music video was made to promote the song.

For the Latin Grammy Awards of 2008, the track was nominated on the field for "Best Tropical Song", the second song for Estefan to be nominated on this category (following "No Me Dejes de Querer" in 2000), and became Estefan's first winning of a Latin Grammy for a song. She had previously won a Latin Grammy, but it was for a music video - short form; this also became her first Grammy for a song in her entire career, including the Latin and non-Latin Grammy's.

Later, the song was nominated to a Latin Billboard Music Award in the category for "Tropical Airplay Song Of The Year, Female", but she lost to Ivy Queen's song "Dime."

== Commercial performance ==
The song become in a minor hit for Estefan, being one of the few singles released to Latin music-stations not enter to the Hot Latin Songs chart, her last single made it onto the Top 40 and was a hit in the Latin Tropical format, this last being the only chart in which this song entered to the Top Ten.

== Formats and track listings ==
U.S. Promo CD Single (88697 27102 2) [February 2008]
No.	Title	Writer(s)	Length
1.	"Píntame De Colores"	Gloria M. Estefan, Emilio Estefan, Ricardo Gaitan, Alberto Gaitan	3:32

Netherlands Promo CDr Single (No Catalog Number)
No.	Title	Writer(s)	Length
1.	"Píntame De Colores"	Gloria M. Estefan, Emilio Estefan, Ricardo Gaitan, Alberto Gaitan	3:32

Switzerland Promo CDr Single (No Catalog Number)
No.	Title	Writer(s)	Length
1.	"Píntame De Colores"	Gloria M. Estefan, Emilio Estefan, Ricardo Gaitan, Alberto Gaitan	3:32
2.	"Bésame"	Emilio Estefan, Ricardo Gaitan, Alberto Gaitan	3:52

== Credits and personnel ==
Credits adapted from the liner notes of the 90 Millas CD and "Píntame De Colores" Promotional CD single.

- Gloria M. Estefan – writer, vocals and mixing
- Emilio Estefan Jr. – writer, record producer and mixing
- Alberto Gaitan – writer, record producer, background vocals, wood sticks and maracas
- Ricardo Gaitan – writer, record producer, background vocals, wood sticks and maracas
- Cheito Quiñonez - background vocals
- Andy García - bongos and bell
- Nelson Gonzalez - tres
- Marco Linares – guitar
- Jesús Cruz – laúd
- Sal Cuevas – bass
- Edwin Bonilla – minor percussion, timbales, güiro and conga
- Danny Ponce & Mike Couzzi – tracking engineers
- Eric Schilling - mixing
- Recorded at Crescent Moon Studios, Miami, Florida.

== Chart performance ==
=== Weekly charts ===
Chart (2008)	Peak position
U.S. Billboard Hot Latin Tropical/Salsa Airplay	9
U.S. Radio & Records National Tropical Airplay	33
