= No Llores =

Single by Gloria Estefan featuring Carlos Santana, José Feliciano and Sheila E.

from the album 90 Millas
- Released: June 18, 2007
- Recorded: 2006; Miami, United States (Crescent Moon Studios)
- Genre: Danzón
- Length: 4:13
- Label: Burgundy Records; Sony BMG
- Songwriters: Gloria Estefan; Emilio Estefan Jr.; Alberto Gaitan; Ricardo Gaitan
- Producers: Emilio Estefan Jr.; Alberto Gaitan; Ricardo Gaitan

Gloria Estefan singles chronology
"Dr. Pressure" (2005)	"No Llores" (2007)	"Me Odio" (2007)

Carlos Santana singles chronology
"Cry Baby Cry" (2006)	"No Llores" (2007)	"Into the Night" (2007)

"No Llores" (Don't Cry) is a song recorded by Cuban-American singer Gloria Estefan for her fourth Spanish-language and eleventh studio album, 90 Millas. It features additional work with popular Latin music performers such as guitarists Carlos Santana and José Feliciano, Sheila E. playing the timbales, and Arturo Sandoval on trumpet (uncredited). The song was written by Gloria Estefan and her husband, Emilio Estefan Jr. and Gaitanes (Alberto y Ricardo Gaitan), while production was credited to Estefan Jr. and Gaitanes. The single was released by Sony BMG on June 18, 2007 digitally worldwide as the lead single from 90 Millas.

With strong Latin rhythms in the background, the song is a danzón that mixes some elements of popular pop music with Cuban rhythms, interpolating guitar sounds in two different ways: acoustic by Feliciano and Santana's traditional electric guitar sound. Upon its release, the song received critical acclaim, describing that Estefan Spanish-language solo musical efforts were often her best performances since she left the Miami Sound Machine.

Commercially, the single was a success, becoming on Estefan's fourteenth number-one song on the "Hot Latin Songs" chart, extending her record as the female artist with most number one hits on the chart. An accompanying music video was premiered to support the single; the song was also remixed to fit different formats, collaborations with some rappers were added, which included: Wisin & Yandel and Pitbull. Gloria received a Billboard Latin Music Award for the song in the category "Top Tropical Airplay Of The Year - Female" at the ceremony held in 2008.

== Distribution ==
The single was commercially released on June 18, 2007 digitally around the world at iTunes music store. The song with strong Latin rhythms, became popular, mostly because was a return to Hispanic radio-stations at the United States since her album Unwrapped, which featured the smash hits "Hoy" and "Tu Fotografía", both #1 Latin hits stateside.

Several remixes were commissioned to fit different formats: a reggaeton remix was added on the special edition of the album stateside and the UK, featuring rap duo, Wisin & Yandel; a hip-hop style remix, which was made available to iTunes music store, featured Cuban rapper Pitbull. There was also a salsa remix included on the promotional singles sent to radio-stations and Spanish DJ, Mac Devila, created two house remixes that were released only to the Netherlands.

The song was used to promote the telephone company AT&T in the United States.

== Chart performance ==
In the United States, "No Llores" debuted on the Billboard charts in the Latin Pop Airplay at the Top 30, and also appeared on the "Hot Latin Tropical/Salsa Airplay" chart, reaching the top spot in its third week. The song debuted at number thirty-nine on the "Hot Latin Tracks" chart, and reached number one on the chart the week of August 30. The song debuted at the "Hot Latin Regional Mexican Airplay" chart at number thirty-four in its first week and peaked at number twenty-one. At the end of 2007, No Llores was listed on the Billboard Year-End Charts under "Hot Tropical Songs Of The Year" at #15. However it became her first lead single from a Spanish-language album, to not feature at the Billboard Hot 100 chart.

Internationally the song had moderate success, by reaching Top 10 position at Mexico's Top Latino chart, but reaching number sixty-four at Monitor Latino 100, Mexico's most important chart. With a similar peak, the song was able to peak at sixty-seven at the Chile's major singles chart. However was a Top 10 hit at the Latin American Top 40 chart and at a Top 20 at the Top Ibero-American chart.

== Music video ==
A music video for the song directed by Emilio Estefan Jr. was shot in New York city on April 4, 2007. The video premiered on Univision's news program, Primer Impacto on June 27, 2007 and included a behind-the-scenes special.

The video was filmed in a sepia tones and features Gloria wearing the same Panama hat that she wears on the single cover. Footage of the performing musicians appears throughout the video, including José Feliciano playing the guitar, Sheila E. at the timbales, and Arturo Sandoval on trumpet.

== Formats and track listings ==
These are the formats and track listings of major single releases of "No Llores".

- Digital download
1. "No Llores" (featuring Carlos Santana, José Feliciano and Sheila E.) – 4:13
- CD single
1. "No Llores" (featuring Carlos Santana, José Feliciano and Sheila E.) – 4:13
- Netherlands 12 Vinyl Single
1. "No Llores" (Mac Devila Vocal Remix) – 9:18
2. "No Llores" (Mac Devila Dub Remix) – 9:18
- Digital download - Hip-Hop Remix
1. "No Llores" (featuring Pitbull) – 3:53
- US CD Remixes
1. "No Llores" (featuring Carlos Santana, José Feliciano and Sheila E.) – 4:13
2. "No Llores" (featuring Pitbull) [Hip-Hop Remix] – 3:53
3. "No Llores" (Hip-Hop Remix) – 3:10
4. "No Llores" (featuring Wisin & Yandel) [Reggaeton Remix] – 3:59

== Credits and personnel ==
- Gloria M. Estefan – writer, vocals and mixing
- Emilio Estefan Jr. – writer, record producer and mixing
- Alberto Gaitan – writer, record producer, background vocals and maracas
- Ricardo Gaitan – writer, record producer, background vocals and maracas
- Cheito Quiñonez - background vocals
- Carlos Santana – electric guitar
- José Feliciano – acoustic guitar
- Sheila E. – timbales
- Paquito Hechavarría – piano
- Marco Linares – guitar and cuatro
- Jesús Cruz – laúd
- Sal Cuevas – bass
- Luis Enrique – congas & bongos
- Edwin Bonilla – minor percussion
- Hernan "Teddy" Mulet – trumpets
- Braily Ramos – trombones
- Danny Ponce & Mike Couzzi – tracking engineers
- Eric Schilling - mixing
- Recorded at Crescent Moon Studios, Miami, Florida.

Credits adapted from the liner notes of the 90 Millas CD and "No Llores" CD single .

== Charts ==
=== Weekly charts ===
Chart (2007)	Peak position
Mexican Airplay Chart	64
US Billboard Bubbling Under Hot 100 Singles	17
US Billboard Hot Latin Songs	1
US Billboard Hot Latin Tropical/Salsa Airplay	1
US Billboard Latin Regional Mexican Airplay	21
US Billboard Latin Rhythm Airplay	16

== Official versions ==
Original versions

- Album version — 4:09 (Featuring Carlos Santana, José Feliciano and Sheila E.)

Remixes

- Salsa remix — 4:31
- Hip-Hop remix — 3:50 (Featuring Pitbull)
- Reggaeton remix — 3:56 (Featuring Wisin & Yandel)
- Mac Devila vocal remix — 9:18
- Mac Devila dub remix — 9:18

== Release history ==
Country	Date	Format	Label
Worldwide	June 18, 2007	Digital download	Burgundy Records, Sony BMG
Germany	July 6, 2007	CD single	Burgundy Records, Sony BMG
Europe	August 23, 2007	CD single	Burgundy Records, Sony BMG
