= Hotel Nacional (song) =

Single by Gloria Estefan

from the album Miss Little Havana
- Released: 2011
- Genre: Latin pop, dance-pop
- Length: 3:28
- Label: Verve Forecast, Crescent Moon
- Songwriter: Gloria Estefan
- Producers: Emilio Estefan, Motiff

Gloria Estefan singles chronology
| "Wepa" (2011) | "Hotel Nacional" (2011) | "Almost Like Praying" (2017) |

"Hotel Nacional" ("National Hotel") is a song by Cuban-American recording artist Gloria Estefan. It was released as the second single from her studio album Miss Little Havana (2011). Written by Estefan, the song portrays the need to dance, going to parties and being glamorous. On February 3, 2012 a sneak peek of the video for the song was provided to an audience at the American Airlines Arena in Miami, Florida.

The song became commercially successful when it debuted at the top of the Billboard Latin Songs chart, the first number-one debut for Estefan and the first single by a female performer to start at this position. "Hotel Nacional" has been widely remixed by several DJs including Pablo Flores, Ralphi Rosario, Mike Cruz, Funk3d among others.

== Background ==
Cuban-American singer Gloria Estefan announced her retirement from the large world tours after the release of her studio album 90 Millas in 2007. Three years later American producer and performer Pharrell Williams presented Estefan with two songs, "I Can't Believe" and "Miss Little Havana", which the singer liked, and they began working on them in the recording studio while writing the rest of the songs included on Miss Little Havana. The album was recorded in English with some Spanish and French lyrics. Coincidentally, the album was released on the 25th anniversary of her single "Conga", and with the album purchase a new version of the track, titled "Conga 25", can be downloaded.

== Composition and reception ==
"Hotel Nacional" was described by Estefan as a "very woody, old fashioned sound, cause it's jitterbuggy ... It's got clarinets, it's got saxes, and a whole different vibe-it just sounds like you could be in the 20s but with hardcore dance", while commenting on the tracks included her album on Billboard. On the review for Miss Little Havana, Stephen Thomas Erlewine of Allmusic related the lyrics "cuchi cuchi" to Spanish performer Charo. Eric Henderson of Slant Magazine noted that the track "undercuts its pitched beat with wonky Dixieland clarinet riffs." On the review of the parent album by Soul Bounce, they commended the way producer Motiff reinterprets the "big-band sound loops" of house music in the late '80s on the track.

== Chart performance ==
The song debuted at the top of the Billboard Top Latin Songs chart dated on the week of January 14, 2012, becoming the fifteenth number-one song for Estefan, her first number-one debut and first debut at the top by a female performer. Estefan joined Juanes, Enrique Iglesias, Juan Gabriel, Maná, Ricky Martin, Romeo Santos, Marco Antonio Solís and Los Temerarios in the group of performers that have debuted at the top of the chart at the time. With "Hotel Nacional" Estefan extends her record as the female performer with most number-one songs on the list and the third performer overall, only surpassed by Iglesias and Luis Miguel.

== Charts ==
=== Weekly charts ===
| Chart (2011–2012) | Peak position |
|---|---|
| Mexico Billboard Pop Español Airplay | 47 |
| US Billboard Latin Songs | 1 |
| US Billboard Hot Club Dance Play | 1 |

=== Year-end charts ===
| Chart (2012) | Peak position |
|---|---|
| US Billboard Dance/Club Songs | 30 |
| US Billboard Tropical Songs | 50 |

== See also ==
- List of number-one Billboard Top Latin Songs of 2012
- List of number-one dance singles of 2012 (U.S.)
