= The Standards =

Studio album by Gloria Estefan
- Released: September 10, 2013
- Genre: Traditional pop; swing
- Label: Crescent Moon; Sony Masterworks
- Producer: Emilio Estefan

Gloria Estefan chronology
Miss Little Havana (2011)	The Standards (2013)	Gloria Estefan: The Dutch Collection (2013)

Professional ratings
Review scores
Source	Rating
AllMusic	3/5 stars
Entertainment Focus	4/5 stars
The Plain Dealer	A

The Standards is the thirteenth studio album by Cuban-American recording artist Gloria Estefan. It was released on September 10, 2013, on Sony Masterworks. The album features a selection of covers of traditional pop standards from the Great American Songbook.

The album was nominated in the category of Best Traditional Pop Vocal Album for the 56th Grammy Awards.

== Background ==
Estefan initially released the covers album Hold Me, Thrill Me, Kiss Me in 1994. It was a commercial success, giving Estefan two international hits, "Turn The Beat Around" and "Everlasting Love". However, in 1993, Estefan recorded a duet with Frank Sinatra for his smash album Duets, in which she replaced her traditional dance-pop sound for a more mature and soft sound, covering the ballad "Come Rain Or Come Shine".

Estefan herself commented she grew up listening to songs of Sinatra, Johnny Mathis, Henry Mancini and other famous crooners, including Latinos, citing this as an explanation as to why she was thrilled to release an album filled with traditional songs known from the Great American Songbook. Estefan stated several times in interviews that her favorite song of all time was Carlos Gardel's most famous song, "El Día Que Me Quieras", which was translated into English for this album. This track was intended to be released as the lead single, but was later replaced by "How Long This Has Been Going On?". Estefan previously performed the song, with its original Spanish lyrics, as the closing number to her 2009 concert in Buenos Aires during the 90 Millas World Tour.

== Recording ==
"This album brings everything full circle for me! The songs were chosen by my heart and what I feel. I wanted to do an album without an extraneous note, with an economy of music so it would be just enough to express the emotion of the song."

—Gloria Estefan talking about her comeback in music after Miss Little Havana

A total of 50 songs were chosen to be recorded for the album, but only 16 songs that made the final cut. The track list was decided by Estefan and Shelly Berg, the front leader and Dean of Music at the University of Miami's Frost School of Music. Before Estefan, Berg had previously collaborated with other famous musicians, such as Patti Austin, Elliott Smith and Arturo Sandoval.

The album was recorded with musicians experienced in this genre, with the work of an entire orchestra being recruited. Some of the session musicians included on the album featured artists like Laura Pausini, Joshua Bell and Dave Koz.

Estefan tried to approach these standards with fresh ideas. For "They Can't Take That Away From Me", they attempted to combine Afro-Cuban music with waltz music, replicating Estefan's traditional style. For Brazilian composer Antonio Carlos Jobim's classic "Eu Sei Que Vou Te Amar", Estefan composed English lyrics for the first-ever English version, titled, "It's You I’ll Always Love"; she also translated the song into Spanish and French. She also composed Spanish lyrics for Charlie Chaplin's "Smile", on which she sings with Laura Pausini in both the Spanish and Italian versions. The recording of this song was principally inspired by the Michael Jackson and Natalie Cole version.

== Promotion ==
Estefan started the promotion for The Standards era by announcing a one-night-only concert at the Royal Albert Hall, performing her new songs as well as some of her older hits in a different way.

"It's always been a dream of mine to perform at the Royal Albert Hall because of its incredible history and elegance, to be able to perform songs from my new album, The Standards and my hits with a new twist, takes my excitement for this concert to an entirely new level."

—Gloria Estefan talking about her comeback concert at the Royal Albert Hall

Oprah Winfrey also made news, when she and Estefan were spotted in Vero Beach at Gloria's favorite shopping stores while Winfrey was interviewing her about future projects. A week later, was announced that Estefan will take part of Miami's UM Frost Festival, which is dated for October 1 at the Gusman Concert Hall.

In the last week of July 2013, Estefan announced more promotional stops for her album in Europe and Brazil. She started at two stops in Brazil for the 25th anniversary of Só Pra Contrariar at their special concerts in São Paulo and Porto allegre on for August 4 and 9 2013. She also headlined the People en Español festival August 31 in San Antonio, Texas. At the same time, it was announced that Estefan would be the headliner of the international concert Night of the Proms, with eight dates scheduled for November 2013 at Antwerp and Rotterdam Ahoy.

She appeared on CBS This Morning Saturday the week of the album's U.S. release and performed the song "Good Morning Heartache" in front of original author of the song Ervin Drake. Estefan also made a mini-tour to South America and went to some talk-shows such as with Fátima Bernardes in Brazil where she performed "Eu Sei Que Vou Te Amar", then she went to Buenos Aires to perform "El Día Que Me Quieras" and "Mi Tierra" at Susana Giménez talk show, there she stated that Gardel Institute gave her permission of making a transition to English-language of "El Día Que Me Quieras," and also told Giménez, it was Emilio's and her wedding song. She told they were working on the musical and looking for bilingual artists to the biographical performances of their lives. Estefan was also on the August 2013 AARP Magazine cover and Ocean Drive, on this latest, she had a photoshoot with some iconic and glamorous images.

A day before the American release, Estefan appeared promoting the album on different interview shows such as Larry Flick, with Perez Hilton as part of the SiriusXM's Town Hall program, with Ismael Cala at CALACNN.

=== Singles ===
On July 8, 2013 it was announced via Amazon.com that the lead single for the album, would be "How Long Has This Been Going On?" and that was to be released at the same site on July 9, 2013, as single download. That same date, the album pre-order was made available at the same store and iTunes Store.

== Track listing ==
No.	Title	Writer(s)	Producer(s)	Length
1.	"Good Morning Heartache"	Irene Higginbotham, Ervin Drake, Dan Fisher	Emilio Estefan, Jr.	4:21
2.	"They Can't Take That Away from Me"	George Gershwin, Ira Gershwin	E. Estefan, Jr.	4:02
3.	"What a Difference a Day Makes"	Stanley Adams, María Grever	E. Estefan, Jr.	3:41
4.	"I've Grown Accustomed to His Face"	Alan Jay Lerner	E. Estefan, Jr.	4:10
5.	"Eu Sei que Vou Te Amar"	Antônio Carlos Jobim	E. Estefan, Jr.	3:35
6.	"The Day You Say You Love Me" (featuring Joshua Bell)	Gloria Estefan, Carlos Gardel, Alfredo Le Pedra	E. Estefan, Jr.	4:50
7.	"Embraceable You"	George Gershwin, Ira Gershwin	E. Estefan, Jr.	3:58
8.	"What a Wonderful World"	Bob Thiele, George David Weiss	E. Estefan, Jr.	4:11
9.	"How Long Has This Been Going On?" (featuring Dave Koz)	George Gershwin, Ira Gershwin	E. Estefan, Jr.	4:14
10.	"Sonríe (Smile)" (featuring Laura Pausini)	John Turner, Geoffrey Parsons	E. Estefan, Jr.	3:41
11.	"The Way You Look Tonight" (featuring Dave Koz)	Dorothy Fields, Jerome Kern	E. Estefan, Jr.	4:06
12.	"You Made Me Love You"	Joseph McCarthy	E. Estefan, Jr.	3:58
13.	"Young at Heart"	Carolyn Leigh	E. Estefan, Jr.	4:10

Gilt Groupe edition bonus tracks
No.	Title	Producer(s)	Length
14.	"It's You I'll Always Love"	E. Estefan, Jr.

North America iTunes Store deluxe edition bonus tracks
No.	Title	Writer(s)	Producer(s)	Length
14.	"Sonríe (Smile)" (solo version)	John Turner, Geoffrey Parsons	E. Estefan, Jr.	3:41
15.	"Yo Sé Te Voy a Amar"	Antônio Carlos Jobim	E. Estefan, Jr.	3:35
16.	"Natural Woman" (Live featuring Carole King)	Gerry Goffin, Carole King, Jerry Wexler	E. Estefan, Jr.	4:51
17.	"The Standards" (Bonus video)

Spain edition bonus tracks
No.	Title	Writer(s)	Producer(s)	Length
14.	"El Día Que Me Quieras" (featuring Joshua Bell)	Gloria Estefan, Carlos Gardel, Alfredo Le Pedra	E. Estefan, Jr.	4:50
15.	"Yo Sé Te Voy A Amar"	Antônio Carlos Jobim	E. Estefan, Jr.	3:35
16.	"Natural Woman" (Live featuring Carole King)	Gerry Goffin, Carole King, Jerry Wexler	E. Estefan, Jr.	4:51

Asian/Australian/European/Best Buy edition bonus tracks
No.	Title	Writer(s)	Producer(s)	Length
14.	"Sorridi (Smile)" (featuring Laura Pausini)	John Turner, Geoffrey Parsons	E. Estefan, Jr.	3:41
15.	"Tu sais je vais t'aimer"	Antônio Carlos Jobim	E. Estefan, Jr.	3:35

Alternate European edition bonus tracks
No.	Title	Writer(s)	Producer(s)	Length
14.	"Sorridi (Smile)" (featuring Laura Pausini)	John Turner, Geoffrey Parsons	E. Estefan, Jr.	3:41
15.	"Tu sais je vais t'aimer"	Antônio Carlos Jobim	E. Estefan, Jr.	3:35
16.	"Natural Woman" (Live featuring Carole King)	Gerry Goffin, Carole King, Jerry Wexler	E. Estefan, Jr.	4:51

Italian bonus tracks
No.	Title	Writer(s)	Producer(s)	Length
14.	"Sorridi (Smile)" (featuring Laura Pausini)	John Turner, Geoffrey Parsons	E. Estefan, Jr.	3:41
15.	"Tu sais je vais t'aimer"	Antônio Carlos Jobim	E. Estefan, Jr.	3:35
16.	"Natural Woman" (Live featuring Carole King)	Gerry Goffin, Carole King, Jerry Wexler	E. Estefan, Jr.	4:51
17.	"Sorridi (Smile)" (solo version)	John Turner, Geoffrey Parsons	E. Estefan, Jr.	3:41

Spain deluxe iTunes edition
No.	Title	Writer(s)	Producer(s)	Length
9.	"Call Me Irresponsible"	Jimmy Van Heusen, Sammy Cahn	E. Estefan, Jr.	4:26
10.	"How Long Has This Been Going On" (featuring Dave Koz)	George Gershwin, Ira Gershwin	E. Estefan, Jr.	4:15
11.	"Sonríe (Smile)" (featuring Laura Pausini)	John Turner, Geoffrey Parsons	E. Estefan, Jr.	3:56
12.	"The Way You Look Tonight" (featuring Dave Koz)	Dorothy Fields, Jerome Kern	E. Estefan, Jr.	4:10
13.	"You Made Me Love You"	Joseph McCarthy	E. Estefan, Jr.	4:02
14.	"For All We Know"	J. Fred Coots, Sam M. Lewis	E. Estefan, Jr.	4:19
15.	"Young at Heart"	Carolyn Leigh	E. Estefan, Jr.	4:05

Target deluxe edition/Latin American track listing
No.	Title	Writer(s)	Producer(s)	Length
16.	"Smile"	John Turner, Geoffrey Parsons	E. Estefan, Jr.	3:41
17.	"El Día Que Me Quieras" (featuring Joshua Bell)	Gloria Estefan, Carlos Gardel, Alfredo Le Pedra	E. Estefan, Jr.	4:50

Latin American iTunes Store deluxe edition track listing
No.	Title	Writer(s)	Producer(s)	Length
18.	"Sorridi (Smile)" (featuring Laura Pausini)	John Turner, Geoffrey Parsons	E. Estefan, Jr.	3:41
19.	"Yo Sé Te Voy a Amar"	Antônio Carlos Jobim	E. Estefan, Jr.	3:35
20.	"Natural Woman" (Live featuring Carole King)	Gerry Goffin, Carole King, Jerry Wexler	E. Estefan, Jr.	4:51

== Charts ==
Chart (2013)	Peak position
Dutch Albums (Album Top 100)	72
Spanish Albums (PROMUSICAE)	13
UK Albums (OCC)	66
US Billboard 200	20

== Release history ==
Region	Date	Format
US	September 10, 2013	CD & Digital
Europe	September 9, 2013	CD & Digital
Europe	September 30, 2013	Vinyl
UK	September 14, 2013	CD & Digital
Spain	October 22, 2013	CD (Special Edition)
