= Miss Little Havana =

Studio album by Gloria Estefan
- Released: September 27, 2011
- Genres: Pop; dance-pop; Latin pop
- Length: 55:57
- Labels: Crescent Moon; Verve Forecast
- Producers: Gloria Estefan; Emilio Estefan; Pharrell Williams

Gloria Estefan chronology
90 Millas (2007)	Miss Little Havana (2011)	The Standards (2013)

Singles from Miss Little Havana
- 1. "Wepa" Released: July 24, 2011; 2. "Miss Little Havana" Released: September 2011; 3. "Hotel Nacional" Released: November 2011

Miss Little Havana is the twelfth studio album by Cuban-American recording artist Gloria Estefan. The singer's first English-language album since 2003's Unwrapped and her twenty-sixth overall, it was released on September 27, 2011, on Crescent Moon Records, distributed by Verve Forecast and Universal Music Group. The project was largely conceived and produced by urban producer Pharrell Williams, while Estefan's husband Emilio Estefan contributed another four tracks to the album. In the US, the album was released only through Target stores.

The album received mixed reviews, with critics divided over Williams' contemporary production and its blend of dance-pop with Estefan's Latin influences. While some praised its energetic, playful approach and successful modernization of her sound, others criticized its rigid rhythms and overly stylized production. Commercially, the album achieved moderate success, peaking at number 28 on the US Billboard 200 and reaching the top 30 in Mexico. Preceding the album's release, lead single "Wepa" was released for digital download in July 2011, and reached the top of the US Hot Dance Club Songs chart.

== Background ==
Estefan announced her retirement from music after the release of her studio album 90 Millas in 2007. Three years later American producer and performer Pharrell Williams presented Estefan with two songs, "I Can't Believe" and "Miss Little Havana", which the singer liked, and they began working on them in the recording studio while writing the rest of the songs included on Miss Little Havana. Estefan first became interested in collaborating with Williams after meeting him through their trainer at a Miami gym in early 2010. The pair began sending messages back and forth, while Williams started writing songs he hoped Estefan would want to record. It was not until early 2011, they entered the recording booth to create the basis for Miss Little Havana. The album was recorded in English with some Spanish lyrics. Coincidentally, the album was released on the 25th anniversary of her single "Conga", and with the CD purchase a new version of the track, titled "Conga 25", is available for download.

== Critical reception ==
Professional ratings
Review scores
Source	Rating
AllMusic	2/5 stars
Slant Magazine	3/5 stars

Critical reception of Miss Little Havana was mixed, with reviewers divided over Pharrell Williams' contemporary production and its balance between modern dance-pop and Estefan's Latin influences. Joey Guerra from the Houston Chronicle praised Miss Little Havana as Estefan's return to the dance floor, calling it her "most enjoyable album since 1998's Gloria!." He highlighted Williams' production for updating her sound while preserving its Latin identity, with tracks such as "Heat," "Say Ay," "Right Away," and "Wepa" blending contemporary dance-pop with salsa, cumbia, disco, and tropical influences. Slant Magazine's Eric Henderson gave the album a mixed assessment, praising its playful, self-aware approach to dance music and its ability to avoid many of the genre's clichés. However, he found the album's stylized production ultimately less lasting, concluding that it "makes an impression, even though you probably won't want to wear it again." Stephen Thomas Erlewine of AllMusic praised Williams for giving Estefan's sound a livelier, more contemporary setting, particularly on tracks such as "Make Me Say Yes." However, he criticized the album's rigid rhythms and found its Cuban-influenced material "stiff and mannered,” ultimately falling short of the "colorful, endless party" it aimed to create.

== Commercial performance ==
Miss Little Havana achieved moderate commercial success upon its release in 2011. In the United States, it peaked at number 28 on the US Billboard 200, while reaching number 27 on the Mexican Albums Chart. In Spain, the album peaked at number 93, giving it a modest presence in the European market.

== Track listing ==
Miss Little Havana track listing
No.	Title	Writer(s)	Length
1.	"Miss Little Havana"	Pharrell Williams	3:15
2.	"I Can't Believe"	Williams	3:42
3.	"Heat"	Williams	3:49
4.	"Wepa"	Emilio Estefan, Gloria Estefan, Williams	4:01
5.	"Say Ay"	G. Estefan, Williams	2:53
6.	"So Good"	E. Estefan, G. Estefan, Williams	3:16
7.	"Right Away"	E. Estefan, G. Estefan, Williams	4:07
8.	"Make Me Say Yes"	Williams	3:56
9.	"Time Is Ticking"	E. Estefan, G. Estefan, Williams	3:54
10.	"Hotel Nacional"	E. Estefan, G. Estefan, Motiff	3:28
11.	"Make My Heart Go" (featuring El Cata)	Edward "El Cata" Bello, Black Dada, E. Estefan, Motiff	3:53

International digital edition bonus tracks
No.	Title	Writer(s)	Length
11.	"On"	Black Dada, Danny Ponce, E. Estefan	4:26
12.	"Make My Heart Go" (featuring El Cata)	Edward "El Cata" Bello, Black Dada, E. Estefan, Motiff	3:53
13.	"Medicine"	E. Estefan, Adrian "Drop" Santalla, Azriel "Phe" Reckley	4:04

Digital bonus edition track listing
No.	Title	Writer(s)	Length
14.	"Wepa" (R3hab Remix featuring Pitbull)	E. Estefan, G. Estefan, Williams, Armando C. Perez	3:28
15.	"Let's Get Loud"	G. Estefan, Kike Santander	3:43

Target / Canadian Enhanced CD bonus download and international physical edition bonus track
No.	Title	Writer(s)	Length
16.	"Conga 25"	Enrique E. Garcia	3:58

== Charts ==
Chart performance for Miss Little Havana
Chart (2011)	Peak position
Mexican Albums (Top 100 Mexico)	27
Spanish Albums (Promusicae)	93
US Billboard 200	28

== Release history ==
Miss Little Havana release history
Region	Date	Format	Ref(s)
United States	September 27, 2011	Special Edition CD	
Worldwide	October 3, 2011	Digital album	
Latin America	November 29, 2011	CD album	
Mexico	November 29, 2011	CD album	
Portugal	November 29, 2011	CD album	
Spain	November 29, 2011	CD album	
