= Eu Sei que Vou Te Amar =

1959 bossa nova jazz standard composed by Antônio Carlos Jobim and Vinícius de Moraes

"Eu Sei Que Vou Te Amar" is a bossa nova jazz standard composed by Antônio Carlos Jobim and Vinícius de Moraes. The first recording was by the Brazilian singer Maysa, appeared on her 33 rpm LP (Maysa Maysa É ... É Maysa, Maysa It!), RGE - XRLP 5068, published in 1959. Another version was the 13th track on Vinícius de Moraes's 1970 album En 'la Fusa' con Maria Creuza y Toquinho (also known as Grabado en Buenos Aires con Maria Creuza y Toquinho with vocalist Maria Creuza and guitarist Toquinho).

The song was voted by the Brazilian edition of Rolling Stone as the 24th greatest Brazilian song.

It has since been covered by:

- João Gilberto
- Caetano Veloso
- Bebo & Cigala
- Vinicius de Moraes
- Adriana Calcanhotto
- Ivan Lins
- Rosa Passos
- Elis Regina
- Walter Wanderley
- Gal Costa
- Soledad Giménez
- Gloria Estefan (Portuguese, English "It's You I'll Always Love," French "Tu sais je vais t'aimer," Spanish "Yo sé te voy a amar")
- Ivete Sangalo
- María Martha Serra Lima
- Maysa
