= Papayo =

Coordinates: 19°18′28″N 98°41′55″W

Papayo is a volcano in the State of Mexico, Mexico. The date of the volcano's last eruption is unknown, but the existence of lava flows overlaying glacial moraines implies Papayo erupted after the end of the Ice Age.
