= 90 Millas =

Studio album by Gloria Estefan
- Released: September 17, 2007
- Recorded: 2006
- Studios: Glenwood Place Studios (Burbank, California), Capitol Studios (Los Angeles, CA), Alfa Recording Studios (San Juan, Puerto Rico), Panic Room Studios (Miami, Florida), Tarpan Studios (San Rafael, California)
- Genres: Cuban; tropical
- Length: 52:28
- Labels: Burgundy Records; Sony BMG
- Producers: Emilio Estefan Jr.; Alberto Gaitan; Ricardo Gaitan; Drop Dead Beats

Gloria Estefan chronology
The Essential Gloria Estefan (2006)	90 Millas (2007)	Miss Little Havana (2011)

Singles from 90 Millas
- 1. "No Llores" Released: June 18, 2007; 2. "Me Odio" Released: November 2007; 3. "Píntame De Colores" Released: February 2008

90 Millas (Spanish pronunciation: [noˈβenta ˈmiʎas]) is the eleventh solo studio album by the Cuban-American singer-songwriter Gloria Estefan, and her fourth Spanish language album, coming after Mi Tierra, Abriendo Puertas and Alma Caribeña. It was released on September 17, 2007, by Sony BMG. All original material, the album contains a selection of various Cuban rhythms mixed with Latin-American contemporary pop.

The album debuted at #25 in the Billboard 200 chart and became Estefan's third number-one album on Billboard's Top Latin Albums. She was also honored with awards including two Latin Grammy Awards for "Best Traditional Tropical Album" and "Best Tropical Song" (for "Píntame De Colores"). Estefan also received two Billboard Latin Music Awards and was the recipient of the BMI Icon of the Year Award.

Three singles were released from the album, although "Pintame De Colores" was a promotional-only single for Latin-radio stations. "No Llores" became Estefan's 14th number-one on Billboard's Latin Songs chart. It was followed by "Me Odio," which shot to the Latin Chart Top 40, and finally the Latin Grammy Award winning song, "Píntame De Colores."

== Recording and development ==
The album, with 14 brand new tracks, is a tribute to the music of Estefan's native Cuba, following on from her previous Cuban-influenced album, 1993's multi-platinum Mi Tierra. 90 Millas has been described as Estefan's love letter to the people of Cuba, and her beloved country.

Carlos Santana made a guest appearance on the album, which also included several other legends of traditional Latin music such as: Andy García, Jose Feliciano, Cachao, La India, Candido Camero, Sheila E., Johnny Pacheco, Papo Lucca, Sal Cuevas, Giovanni Hidalgo, Arturo Sandoval, Paquito D'Rivera, Nelson Gonzalez, Alfredo "Chocolate" Armenteros, Generoso Jiménez, Luis Enrique, and Orestes Vilato. The Album was produced by Emilio Estefan & Gaitán Bros, and Composed by Emilio Estefan, Gloria Estefan, Ricardo Gaitán & Alberto Gaitán.

The album was released worldwide in September 2007 and the track listing was different in certain countries, the European version and the Limited Edition Package (which was released exclusively in United States and United Kingdom) have two bonus tracks; "Vueltas Da La Vida" and "No Llores" (featuring Wisin & Yandel). The Japanese edition also features "Vueltas Da la Vida" as well as "Al Verte Partir", a track exclusive to this version.

The inclusion of Carlos Santana on the album stirred a controversy among certain Cuban exiles in the U.S. who alleged Santana was sympathetic to the Fidel Castro regime and Che Guevara because he had worn a t-shirt featuring Guevara's image created by Jim Fitzpatrick. Emilio and Gloria Estefan issued a joint statement in March 2007, addressing the controversy:

"For the past 32 years of our career, our position against the Castro regime has been crystal clear . . . we have expressed our disagreement with the Cuban dictatorship and have spoken worldwide of the pain of the Cuban people. We have never nor would we ever collaborate with anyone who supports the Cuban dictatorship or Che Guevara. This should be abundantly clear due to our trajectory".

90 Millas made it to the 2007 Billboard Year-End Charts", and ranked #28 at the Billboard Top Latin Albums, and #4 at the Top Tropical Albums. In April 2008, Estefan was the winner of two Billboard Latin Music Awards beating other artists such as Olga Tañon and Fanny Lú in the race for the "Tropical Album of the Year — Female" and "Tropical Airplay Song of the Year" for "No Llores".

Estefan also received three nominations at the Latin Grammy Awards of 2008, and won for "Best Traditional Tropical Album" and "Best Tropical Song" for "Píntame De Colores" (she was also nominated for "Best Music Video – Long Form", but she lost out to Julieta Venegas's MTV Unplugged video concert). Estefan was also selected as the "Persona Del Año" ("Person of the Year"), the first time this award was given to a female artist.

For the 2008 Billboard Year-End charts, the album ranked at #7 in the Top Tropical Albums, and #59 in the Top Latin Albums. Estefan also ranked seventh as the Top Tropical Albums Artist.

== Promotion ==
=== Media and promotional tour ===
Estefan embarked on a short international promotional tour in September 2007. She performed first in Rotterdam, The Netherlands on September 8, 2007. Her performance included new songs, along with a collection of old hits. The performance was free and open to members of the public, and was part of the "Wereld Havens Dagen" (World Harbour Days), commemorating the 75th Anniversary of the Port of Rotterdam. She also performed a free show at the Las Ventas bullring in Madrid, Spain on September 15, 2007.

A point of promotion for the album was a special album signing date at a Starbucks in the Bronx, New York. Another venue of the promo-tour was a special concert at the Beacon Theatre in Manhattan. She was also set to appear on the show Dancing With the Stars, performing some songs from her new album, but canceled the performance due her mother's critical health status. A week later, she performed at the show singing "A Bailar" and her 1985 hit "Conga".

=== Tour ===
On May 1, 2008, Estefan announced that she would begin a tour in September 2008 in Spain to promote her latest effort. The "90 Millas World Tour" was made to promote the album only on the European continent, but before she started the European tour, Estefan made an appearance in the United States at the opening of the MGM Grand's new venue, the Foxwoods Resort Casino, for three sold-out dates including Memorial Day. She then performed at the Casino Rama, in Canada before beginning the European dates.

=== Singles ===
"No Llores" was released as the lead single on June 18, 2007. The song received some praise by Leila Cobo of Billboard who called it "a standout for impeccable production and enviable mix that allows every instrumental line (and there are many) to resonate with bell-like clarity. This is real music, to be danced to as much as cherished for its adept skill". The song was a success on the Latin charts, becoming Estefan's fourteenth number-one on the "Hot Latin Songs" chart and was also another number-one on the Tropical Airplay charts. It was also a Top 20 hit in other Latin major charts such as Latin Pop Airplay, Latin Regional Mexican Airplay and Latin Rhythm Airplay charts. However, the song didn't make it onto the Billboard Hot 100 charting outside it at #117. To promote the song further in different formats, some remixes were made for the single, Cuban rapper Pitbull performed on a Hip-Hop version of the song, and a Reggae mix featuring Puerto-Rican Wisin & Yandel was also released. A Salsa remix was also made.

"Me Odio" was released as the second single from the album in November 2007 as a radio-only single. The song was less successful in comparison to its predecessor, peaking at #37 on the "Hot Latin Songs", though it made the Top 40 on various other Airplay charts such as the Tropical Airplay and the Latin Regional Mexican Airplay. Remixes made again included a Hip-Hop version (this time featuring rapper Fat Joe) and a Salsa version.

"Píntame De Colores" was released as the third and final single from this album in February 2008, again as a U.S. radio promo single. Though the song was a hit in the Tropical Airplay charts, it failed to enter the major Latin charts, becoming Estefan's first single released solely to Latin music stations not to make the Hot Latin Songs chart. Despite this, the song won a Latin Grammy for "Best Tropical Song", and was also nominated for a Billboard Latin Music Award (though lost to Ivy Queen and "Dime").

"Bésame" was released exclusively to Honduras, where due excellent digital sales, the song was able to peak number two on the singles chart, becoming the only country where the song gained that position, and also being the only song to chart from the album at the country.

== Critical reception ==
Professional ratings
Review scores
Source	Rating
Allmusic	4/5 stars
Billboard	favorable
About.com	5/5 stars

Jason Birchmeier from Billboard commented that "ever since Gloria Estefan split from Miami Sound Machine in 1989 to go solo, her best efforts tended to be her Spanish-language ones, and her fourth such album, 90 Millas, is no exception. In fact, it might be her best overall effort—regardless of language—since Mi Tierra (1993), which was her first to be sung entirely in Spanish and an instant, best-selling classic. In a couple ways, 90 Millas is a follow-up to Mi Tierra".

Tijana Illich from about.com said "Gloria Estefan's fourth Spanish-language album is her best, not surprising when you consider the spectacular cast of musicians that join her on this homage to her native Cuba. 90 Millas takes Estefan back to her roots with lots of varied Afro-Cuban rhythms and genres, some pure in form, others mixed with her trademark pop sound. A must have for any fan of modern, Afro-Cuban music".

=== Accolades ===
Year	Award Show	Award
2008	Billboard Latin Music Awards	Tropical Album of the Year — Female
2008	Billboard Latin Music Awards	Tropical Airplay Song of the Year — Female for "No Llores"
2008	Latin Grammy Awards	Best Traditional Tropical Album
2008	Latin Grammy Awards	Best Tropical Song for "Píntame De Colores"
2008	Billboard Year-End Chart	90 Millas ranked at #59 at Top Latin Albums
2008	Billboard Year-End Chart	90 Millas ranked at #7 at Top Latin Tropical Albums
2008	Billboard Year-End Chart	Gloria Estefan ranked at #7 as Top Tropical Albums Artists
2009	Broadcast Music Incorporated (BMI)	Icon of the Year

== Commercial performance ==
In the United States, 90 Millas debuted at #25 on the Billboard 200, selling approximately 23,000 copies in its first week. In comparison, Estefan's previous English-language album, Unwrapped (2003), only made it to #39. 90 Millas also became Estefan's third number-one album on Billboard Top Latin Albums and her fourth number-one on the Billboard Top Tropical Albums. It also went into the Top 20 on Billboard's Top Digital Albums. As of July 2011 it has sold 150,000 copies in the United States.

The album enjoyed some success in other countries, charting at #1 in The Netherlands (becoming the first number-one album for Estefan since 1988's Anything For You and also the first Spanish language album to reach number-one on the Dutch charts). The album was also a Top 10 hit in Spain and Switzerland, and Top 20 in Italy and Europe overall.

== Track listing ==
=== Standard edition ===
No.	Title	Writer(s)	Producer(s)	Length
1.	"Me Odio"	Gloria M. Estefan, E. Estefan Jr., Ricardo Gaitan, Alberto Gaitan	E. Estefan Jr., R. Gaitan, A. Gaitan	3:15
2.	"No Llores" (featuring Carlos Santana, José Feliciano and Sheila E.)	G. Estefan, E. Estefan Jr., R. Gaitan, A. Gaitan	E. Estefan Jr., R. Gaitan, A. Gaitan	4:10
3.	"Lo Nuestro"	G. Estefan	E. Estefan Jr., R. Gaitan, A. Gaitan	4:14
4.	"Píntame De Colores"	G. Estefan, E. Estefan Jr., R. Gaitan, A. Gaitan	E. Estefan Jr., R. Gaitan, A. Gaitan	3:32
5.	"Caridad"	G. Estefan, E. Estefan Jr., R. Gaitan, A. Gaitan	E. Estefan Jr., R. Gaitan, A. Gaitan	3:20
6.	"Yo No Cambiaría"	G. Estefan, E. Estefan Jr., R. Gaitan, A. Gaitan	E. Estefan Jr., R. Gaitan, A. Gaitan	3:41
7.	"Bésame"	E. Estefan Jr., R. Gaitan, A. Gaitan	E. Estefan Jr., R. Gaitan, A. Gaitan	3:52
8.	"Refranes"	E. Estefan Jr., R. Gaitan, A. Gaitan	E. Estefan Jr., R. Gaitan, A. Gaitan	2:59
9.	"A Bailar"	G. Estefan	E. Estefan Jr., R. Gaitan, A. Gaitan	3:42
10.	"Esta Fiesta No Va' Acabar"	G. Estefan, E. Estefan Jr., R. Gaitan	E. Estefan Jr., R. Gaitan, A. Gaitan	3:50
11.	"Volveré"	G. Estefan	E. Estefan Jr., R. Gaitan, A. Gaitan	3:46
12.	"Esperando (Cuando Cuba Sea Libre)"	G. Estefan, E. Estefan Jr., R. Gaitan, A. Gaitan	E. Estefan Jr., R. Gaitan, A. Gaitan	4:40
13.	"Morenita"	E. Estefan Jr., R. Gaitan, DROP DEAD Beats	E. Estefan Jr., R. Gaitan, DROP DEAD Beats	4:13
14.	"90 Millas" (featuring La India)	E. Estefan Jr., R. Gaitan, A. Gaitan	E. Estefan Jr., R. Gaitan, A. Gaitan	4:40

United States & Europe Deluxe Edition Bonus Tracks

No.	Title	Writer(s)	Producer(s)	Length
15.	"Vueltas Da La Vida"	E. Estefan Jr., R. Gaitan, A. Gaitan	E. Estefan Jr., R. Gaitan, A. Gaitan	3:38
16.	"No Llores (Reggaeton Remix)" (featuring Wisin & Yandel)	G. Estefan, E. Estefan Jr., R. Gaitan, A. Gaitan, Juan Luis Morera, Llandel Veguilla	J.L. Morera, L. Veguilla, V. Martinez	3:59

iTunes Bonus Tracks

No.	Title	Writer(s)	Producer(s)	Length
15.	"No Llores (Hip Hop Remix)" (featuring Pitbull)	G. Estefan, E. Estefan Jr., R. Gaitan, A. Gaitan	E. Estefan Jr., R. Gaitan, A. Gaitan	3:53
16.	"Me Odio (Salsa Remix)"	G. Estefan, E. Estefan Jr., R. Gaitan, A. Gaitan	E. Estefan Jr., R. Gaitan, A. Gaitan	2:56

Japan Bonus Tracks

No.	Title	Writer(s)	Producer(s)	Length
15.	"Al Verte Partir"	E. Estefan Jr., R. Gaitan, A. Gaitan	E. Estefan Jr., R. Gaitan, A. Gaitan	3:34
16.	"Vueltas Da La Vida"	E. Estefan Jr., R. Gaitan, A. Gaitan	E. Estefan Jr., R. Gaitan, A. Gaitan	3:38

=== Bonus DVD ===
No.	Title	Writer(s)	Director	Length
1.	"90 Millas: The Documentary" (English version)	E. Estefan Jr., José Maldonado	E. Estefan Jr.	25:04
2.	"90 Millas: El Documental" (Spanish version)	E. Estefan Jr., J. Maldonado	E. Estefan Jr.	25:04
3.	"No Llores" (Music video)	E. Estefan Jr.	E. Estefan Jr.	4:10
4.	"Behind the Scenes of No Llores"	E. Estefan Jr.	E. Estefan Jr.	2:08
5.	"Essential Featurette...A Career Retrospective"	G. Estefan, E. Estefan Jr.	E. Estefan Jr.	12:52

Additional notes:

- Some tracks were originally planned to be on the album but then omitted were: "No Voy a Trabajar" (I'm Not Going to Work), "Tratare De Olvidarte" (I'll Try To Forget You) and "Vueltas Da La Vida" (Life Goes Around). But later "Vueltas Da La Vida" was confirmed by Sony BMG-Japan as being a bonus track on the Japanese version of the album along with a new song titled "Al Verte Partir" (While Watching You Leave).
- Also, some names were changed: "Píntame" was changed for "Píntame De Colores", as "Esperando" was changed finally to "Esperando (Cuando Cuba Sea Libre)".

== Formats ==
- Standard – 14 tracks album.
- Deluxe Edition – 14 tracks + DVD with the documental "90 Millas" with bonus features such the "No Llores" music video, behind the scenes footage and career retrospective.
- Limited Edition Wal-Mart Exclusive 2-Pack – 14 tracks + 2 bonus tracks, includes the deluxe version of the album with a DVD with the documental "90 Millas" with bonus features such the "No Llores" music video, behind the scenes footage and career retrospective. This set was only sold at Wal-Mart stores.

== Personnel ==
=== Musicians ===
- Gloria Estefan – Lead vocals, backing vocals
- Gaitanes Alberto & Ricardo Gaitan (Gaitan Bros.) – producers, arrangers, backing vocals, piano, percussion
- Cheito Quiñonez – Backing vocals
- Alfredo "Chocolate" Armenteros – trumpet on "Me Odio"
- Carlos Santana – electric guitar on "No Llores"
- José Feliciano – acoustic guitar on "No Llores" & "Yo No Cambiaría"
- Luis Enrique – congas & bongos on "No Llores"
- Sheila E. – timbales on "No Llores"
- Nelson González – tres on "Lo Nuestro", "Píntame De Colores", "A Bailar" & "Esperando (Cuando Cuba Sea Libre)"
- Andy García – bongos & bell on "Píntame De Colores"
- Orestes Vilató – bongos & timbales on "Caridad", "A Bailar", "Esta Fiesta No Va' A Acabar" & "Esperando (Cuando Cuba Sea Libre)"
- Giovanni Hidalgo – congas & quinto on "Caridad" & "Esta Fiesta No Va' A Acabar"
- Juanito Marquez – guitar on "Yo No Cambiaría"
- Johnny Pacheco – flute on "Bésame"
- Papo Lucca – piano on "A Bailar"
- Generoso Jiménez – trombone on "Esta Fiesta No Va' A Acabar"
- Arturo Sandoval – trumpet on "Esta Fiesta No Va' A Acabar"
- Israel "Cachao" Lopez – bajo on "Volveré"
- Candido Camero – congas on "Volveré"
- Paquito D'Rivera – saxophone on "Volveré"
- Lionel "Dead Beat" De La O – electric guitar on "Morenita"
- Sal Cuevas – Bass
- Edwin Bonilla – congas, bongos, timbale, minor percussion, guiro
- Daniel Berroa – congas, bongos, maracas, guiro, wood sticks
- Marco Linares – guitar
- Jesús Cruz – laúd
- Javier Concepcion – piano
- Paquito Hechavarría – piano
- Ed Calle – Saxophone
- Braily Ramos – Trombones
- Hernan "Teddy" Mulet – trumpets, horns arrangement
- Pedro Alfonso – Violins

=== Production ===
- Gloria Estefan – mixing engineer
- Emilio Estefan Jr. – Executive producer, mixing engineer
- Ricardo & Alberto Gaitan (Gaitan Bros) (Gaitanes) – producers, tracking engineers
- Bob Ludwig – Mastering
- José Maldonado – production coordinator
- Billie Pechenik – Studio coordinator
- Leyla Leeming – logistic
- Andy Pechenik – technical support
- Kurt Berge – technical support
- Danny Ponce – tracking engineer
- Mike Couzzi – tracking engineer
- Eric Schilling – Mixing engineer
- Steve "Rock Star" Dickey – additional engineer of "Me Odio", "Caridad" & "Volveré"
- Jim Ritzel – additional engineer of "No Llores", "A Bailar" & "Esperando (Cuando Cuba Sea Libre)
- Raymond Mckinley – additional engineer of "No Llores"
- Mauricio Guerrero – additional engineer of "Píntame De Colores"
- Hector Ivan Rosa – additional engineer of "Caridad", "A Bailar"
- Ron Taylor – additional engineer of "Volveré"
- José Colon – assistant engineer at Crescent Moon Studios
- Sarita Torres – assistant engineer at Crescent Moon Studios
- Miguél Bermudez – assistant engineer at Crescent Moon Studios

=== Design ===
- Jennifer Liebeskind – marketing
- Tony Ward – marketing
- Jeff Schluz/Command Z-Design – art direction and design
- Alberto Tolot – photography
- Francesca Tolot – make-up
- Serena Radaelli – hair
- Cristina Cellini – stylist

== Chart positions ==
=== Weekly charts ===
Chart (2007)	Peak Position
Argentina Albums (CAPIF)	3
Belgian Albums (Ultratop Flanders)	66
Belgian Albums (Ultratop Wallonia)	93
Dutch Albums (Album Top 100)	1
European Top Albums Chart	14
French Albums (SNEP)	106
German Albums (Offizielle Top 100)	46
Italian Albums (FIMI)	17
Mexican Albums (AMPROFON)	17
Spanish Albums (Promusicae)	3
Swiss Albums (Schweizer Hitparade)	4
US Billboard 200	25
US Internet Albums (Billboard)	19
US Top Latin Albums (Billboard)	1
US Tropical Albums (Billboard)	1

=== Year-end charts ===
Chart (2007)	Position
Dutch Albums (Album Top 100)	51
Swiss Albums (Schweizer Hitparade)	87
US Top Latin Albums (Billboard)	28
US Tropical Albums (Billboard)	4

Chart (2008)	Position
US Top Latin Albums (Billboard)	59
US Tropical Albums (Billboard)	7

== Certifications ==
Region	Certification	Certified units/sales
Spain (Promusicae)	Gold	40,000^{^}
^{^} Shipments figures based on certification alone.

== Release history ==
Region	Date	Format(s)	Edition(s)
Spain	September 17, 2007	CD, digital download	Standard, deluxe
Worldwide	September 17, 2007	CD, digital download	Standard, deluxe
Japan	September 18, 2007	CD, digital download	Standard, deluxe
United States	September 18, 2007	CD, digital download	Standard, deluxe
Thailand	September 25, 2007	CD, digital download	Standard, deluxe

== See also ==
- List of number-one Billboard Top Latin Albums of 2007
- List of number-one Billboard Tropical Albums from the 2000s
