= Gaitanes =

Panamanian musician duo

Gaitanes is a duo of producer/composer/singers consisting of brothers Ricardo and Alberto Gaitán. They originate from Panama and have been active since 1989. They have released albums, singles and musical collaborations as well as winning various awards and nominations.

== Biography ==
Gaitanes began their musical career in 1989 in their native Panama, where they formed their first group, Impakto (Impact) under the direction of their father, Dicky Gaitán, and the management of their mother, Dalys. They obtained business administration and law degrees in addition to their musical activities. They represented Panama at the OTI Festival 1997 with the song "¿De qué nos vale?". They produced their debut album, Entregat ("surrender"), in 1997, with songs by Omar Alfano, Pedro Azael, Ricardo Vizuette, Mary Lauret and others.

In 1999, they moved to Miami, Florida, where they began their careers as producers, composers, and arrangers under the tutelage of producer Emilio Estefan and continued working as musicians and singers.

Songs from their second album Alberto and Ricardo became hits in several countries. In Chile, the track "Taca Taca" became Song of the Year in 2003, and Gaitanes appeared in conjunction with Mekano (a TV show from Chile) at Monumental Stadium. The song "Mi amor no es un favor" reached the top on U.S., Latin American, and Spanish radios. Their third album, Monte Adentro (Deep Country), was dedicated to their homeland. A video for "Monte Adentro" from the album was filmed in Herrera, Panama. In 2008, as producer and songwriter, the duo won two Latin Grammy Awards for 90 Millas (90 Miles) (a Gloria Estefan album) and for the Best Contemporary Salsa Album and Best Tropical Song of the Year.

In 2008, Issac Delgado's single "No vale la pena" composed by the duo, was nominated for Latin Grammy Awards 2009 and reached the top of the world's tropical stations. Between mid-2008 and early 2010, they produced two groups of Spanish rock from Guatemala. The first, Viento en Contra, saw them nominated for Latin Grammy Awards in 2010. Between 2008 and 2010 they released five singles, "Hazme Sentir (Make Me Feel)." arranged by Cucco Peña; "No juegues conmigo" (Don't play with me), a duet with Ivan Barrios (Panamanian pop singer); "Tengo tantas cosas" (I have so many things), a duet with Samy y Sandra Sandoval (Panamanian cumbia group); "La Señal" (The Sign), with Commando Tiburon (reggaeton group from Panama); and "El Preso (The Prisoner)," with Los Rabanes (Panamanian rock group). The latter was a fusion of Caribbean rhythms, combined with rap and compa (Haitian) rhythms, by Fruko y Sus Tesos.

Their album Caminos was nominated to 2012 Latin Grammy in Best Tropical Contemporary Album Category, and they launched their latest CD La Parranda in which they paid tribute to the music of Panama.

In 2014, they made their album The Kings, including duets with Willie Colón, Oscar D'León, Rey Ruiz, Sergio Vargas, and Tito Nieves. In December 2016, they launched their album La Parranda de Gaitanepayingy, paying tribute to Panamanian musician Lucho Azcarraga. This album was nominated for Latin Grammy 2017 in the category Best Contemporary Tropical Album.

In 2018, they produced a song titled "Rise the Tide" in honor of the Panama soccer team, which, for the first time, was going to play in the World Cup. Later that year, they produced another song called "La Bendición," which was chosen as the song of the Telethon 20-30 of Panama.

In 2019, Ricardo Gaitanes was named Consul General of Panamá in Miami, Florida, USA.

In 2024 they released their eight album "imperdible", where they performed duets with Gilberto Santa Rosa, Rey Ruiz, Mickey Taveras, Tony Vega, Ronald Borjas, Adolescentes, Juan Miguel, Victor Jaramillo & Luis Lugo.

== Discography ==
- Entrégate, 1997
- Alberto y Ricardo, 2001
- Monte Adentro, 2006
- Grandes Exitos, 2008
- Caminos, 2011
- La Parranda, 2012
- The Kings, 2014
- La Parranda de Gaitanes, 2016
- Imperdible, 2024

== Singles ==
- Entrégate, 1997
- No sé que hacer, 1997
- Dimelo Amigo, 1997 (with Tony Vega)
- Mi amor no es un favor, 2001
- De qué nos vale, 2002
- Volveré alguna vez, 2002
- Taca Taca, 2002
- Galán de Novela, 2002
- Te Conozco, 2002 (Arjona Tropical Album)
- Monte Adentro, 2006
- Solo te pido, 2006
- Asi es mi vida, 2006
- Te vas, 2006
- Hazme Sentir, 2008
- No juegues conmigo, 2008 (with Iván Barrios)
- Quien, 2009
- Tengo tantas cosas, 2009 (with Samy y Sandra Sandoval)
- La Señal, 2009 (with Comando Tiburón)
- El Preso, 2010 (with Emilio Regueira)
- Tu ni te imaginas, 2011
- Regresa Pronto, 2012 (with Victor Manuelle)
- Inventaré, 2012
- Soy, 2012
- Tu me respondes, 2012
- Adonay, 2012 (with Willy Chirino)
- Para Mi, 2013
- Solo Contigo, 2013
- Que te parece Cholito, 2013
- Guararé, 2013
- Mi Gallo Pinto, 2013
- De qué me vale, 2014 (with Willie Colón)
- La media vuelta, 2015 (with Rey Ruiz)
- Me cayó del cielo, 2015 (with Oscar D'León)
- Quiero dormir cansado., 2015 (with Tito Nieves)
- La Mesa., 2015
- Esta Navidad., 2016
- Amor Amor. (Perú), 2017 (with Jocimar y su Yambú)
- Solo te pido., 2017
- Me sube hasta el cielo., 2017 (with J Ruiz & Orquesta Café)
- Sube la marea., 2018 (Various Artists)
- La Bendición., 2018 (Teletón 20–30) (Various Artists)
- Desesperado., 2020
- Rumba y Fiesta., 2020
- Si pudiera olvidarla., 2023 (with Mickey Taveras)
- Estas aqui., 2023 (with Rey Ruiz)
- No puedo decirte adiós., 2023 (with Gilberto Santa Rosa)

== Collaborations as singers ==
- Arjona Tropical, Te Conozco, 2001
- Chasing Papi, Taca Taca, 2004
- Edwin Bonilla (Homenaje a los Rumberos), Canto Abacua, 2010 (Latin Grammy 2011 Nominated)
- Mirella Cesa (Duet), Por que te vas, 2012
- Nauta (Duet), 'Contigo soy feliz", 2014
- Jocimar y su Yambú (Duet), 'Amor Amor", 2017
- Rubén Blades, Omar Alfanno, Erika Ender, Emilio Regueira, Nando Boom, and many more (Various Artists), "Sube la marea", 2018
- La Bendición., 2018 (Teletón 20–30)(Various Artists)
- Eddie Montalvo Tributo a Rubén Blades

== Productions and collaborations as producers and composers ==
- Mi forma de sentir, Gianko, 1998 (Composers)
- Arrasando, Thalía, 2000 (Background Vocals)
- Alma Caribeña, Gloria Estefan, 2000 (Musicians, Background Vocals, Arrangers)
- Por un beso (Salsa Version), Gloria Estefan, 2000 (Producers, Arrangers, Musicians, Background Vocals)
- Better part of me, Jon Secada, 2000 (Producers, Arrangers, Musicians, Background Vocals)
- Muy dentro de mi (You sang to me), Marc Anthony, 2000 (Composers)
- Rabanes, Los Rabanes, 2000 (Background Vocals)
- Sound Loaded, Ricky Martin, 2000 (Composers)
- Encore, Roberto Blades, 2000 (Background Vocals)
- Shalim, Shalim, 2000 (Producers, Arrangers, Musicians, Background Vocals)
- Mi Corazon, Jaci Velasquez, 2001 (Producers, Arrangers, Composers, Musicians, Background Vocals)
- Mal Acostumbrado, Fernando Villalona, 2002 (Producers, Arrangers, Composers, Musicians, Background Vocals)
- Miami Sound Machine, MSM, 2002 (Producers, Arrangers, Composers, Musicians, Background Vocals)
- Amanecer, Jon Secada, 2002 (Producers, Arrangers, Composers, Musicians, Background Vocals)
- Dame de eso, Carlos Baute, 2002 (Producers, Arrangers, Musicians, Background Vocals)
- A Tiempo, Gian Marco, 2002 (Background Vocals)
- Jimena, Jimena, 2003 (Producers, Arrangers, Composers, Musicians, Background Vocals)
- Latin Songbird, La India, 2003 (Producers, Arrangers, Composers, Musicians, Background Vocals)
- Cuarto sin Puerta, Shalim, 2003 (Producers, Arrangers, Musicians, Background Vocals)
- Almas del Silencio, Ricky Martin, 2003 (Producers, Arrangers, Composers, Musicians, Background Vocals)
- Las Miami, MSM, 2004 (Producers, Arrangers, Composers, Musicians, Background Vocals)
- Unwrapped, Gloria Estefan, 2004 (Composers)
- Tu Fotografia (salsa version), Gloria Estefan (Producers, Arrangers, Musicians, Background Vocals).
- The Last Don Live, Don Omar, (Carta a un amigo - Salsa Version), 2004 (Producers, Arrangers, Musicians, Background Vocals)
- Asi soy yo, David Bustamante, 2004 (Producers, Arrangers, Composers, Musicians, Background Vocals)
- Seducción, Jennifer Peña, 2004 (Producers, Arrangers, Composers, Musicians, Background Vocals)
- Chasing Papi, Soundtrack, 2004 (Singers, Producers, Arrangers, Composers, Musicians, Background Vocals)
- Empire, Soundtrack, 2004 (Composers)
- Paulatina, Paulina Rubio, 2004 (Producers, Arrangers, Composers, Musicians, Background Vocals)
- Travesia, Victor Manuelle, 2004 (Producers, Arrangers, Composers, Musicians, Background Vocals)
- Lamento (Salsa Version), Gian Marco, 2004 (Producers, Arrangers, Musicians, Background Vocals)
- No hace falta (Salsa Version), Cristian Castro, 2005 (Producers, Arrangers, Musicians, Background Vocals)
- Greatest Hits, Thalia, 2005 (Producers, Arrangers, Composers, Musicians, Background Vocals)
- El Rock de mi Pueblo, Carlos Vives, 2005 (Background Vocals)
- Abreme la puerta, Erika Ender, 2005 (Producers, Arrangers, Musicians, Background Vocals)
- Sedúceme, La India, 2005 (Producers, Arrangers, Composers, Musicians, Background Vocals)
- Noelle, Gloria Estefan, 2005 (Producers, Arrangers, Composers, Musicians, Background Vocals)
- Otra Vez, Ilsa, 2005 (Producers, Arrangers, Composers, Musicians, Background Vocals)
- Gio, Gio, 2006 (Producers, Arrangers, Composers, Musicians, Background Vocals)
- Selena Vive, Gloria Estefan, 2006 (Producers, Arrangers, Musicians, Background Vocals)
- Christian Danielle, Christian Danielle, 2006 (Producers, Arrangers, Composers, Musicians, Background Vocals)
- Obsesión, Daniela Castillo, 2006 (Producers, Arrangers, Composers, Musicians, Background Vocals)
- 90 Millas, Gloria Estefan, 2007 (Producers, Arrangers, Composers, Musicians, Background Vocals)
- Asi Soy, Issac Delgado, 2008 (Composers)
- Casino, Viento en Contra, 2009 (Producers, Arrangers, Composers, Musicians, Background Vocals)
- Los Guerreros de Barrio, La K-Shamba, 2009 "Perdona" (Composers)
- Perfume, El Tambor de la Tribu, 2010 (Producers, Arrangers, Composers, Musicians, Background Vocals)
- Natalia Jimemez, Natalia Jimenez, 2011 (Producers, Arrangers, Musicians)
- El Noble de la Salsa, Johnny Rivera, 2011 "Golpe bajo al corazón" (Composers)
- Super Cubano, Issac Delgado, 2011 "Perdona, Mienteme" (Composers)
- Mas Allá, Gusi y Beto, 2012 "Te Juro" (Composers)
- Viajero Frecuente, Ricardo Montaner, 2012 "Hazme Regresar" (Composers)
- Deseo Concedido, Mirella Cesa, 2012 (Producers, Arrangers, Composers, Musicians, Background Vocals)
- One Flag, Elvis Crespo, 2013 (Background Vocals)
- Radio Universo, Chino & Nacho, 2013 (Background Vocals & Keyboards)
- Sube la marea, Various Artists, 2018 (Producers, Singers, Arrangers, Composers, Musicians, Background Vocals)
- La Bendición, Various Artists, 2018 (Producers, Singers, Arrangers, Composers, Musicians, Background Vocals)

== Awards and nominee ==
- ASCAP, 2000, (Song: Muy dentro de Mi), Marc Anthony
- BMI, 2000, (Song: Muy dentro de mi), Marc Anthony
- Grammy, 2001, (Album: Alma Caribeña), Gloria Estefan (Nominee)
- Latin Grammy, 2001, (Album: Arrasando), Thalia (Nominee)
- Premios Lo Nuestro, 2002, (Album: Alberto y Ricardo), Ricardo y Alberto (Nominee)
- Latin Grammy, 2002, (Album: A Tiempo), Gian Marco (Nominee)
- Grammy, 2002, (Album: Mi Corazón), Jaci Velazquez (Nominee)
- Grammy, 2002, (Album: Mal Acostumbrado), Fernando Villalona (Nominee)
- BMI, 2002, (Song: Ay Bueno), Fernando Villalona
- Grammy, 2003, (Album: Latin Songbird), India (Nominee)
- Latin Grammy, 2003, (Album: Latin Songbird), India (Nominee)
- Grammy, 2004, (Album: Latin Songbird), India (Nominee)
- Latin Grammy, 2004, (Album: Por Ti), Banda El Recodo (Nominee)
- Latin Grammy, 2004, (Album: Almas del Silencio), Ricky Martin (Nominee)
- Latin Grammy, 2004, (Album: Travesia), Victor Manuelle (Nominee)
- Latin Grammy, 2004, (Album: Pau-Latina), Paulina Rubio (Nominee)
- BMI, 2004, (Song: Dame otro tequila), Paulina Rubio
- BMI, 2005, (Song: Llore Llore), Victor Manuelle
- Grammy, 2005, (Album: Travesia), Victor Manuelle (Nominee)
- Grammy, 2005, (Album: Pau-Latina), Paulina Rubio (Nominee)
- Latin Grammy, 2005, (Album: The Last Don Live), Don Omar (Nominee)
- Latin Grammy, 2006, (Album: Soy Differente), India (Nominee)
- Billboard, 2008, (Album: 90 Millas), Gloria Estefan
- Latin Grammy, 2008, Best Traditional Tropical Album, (Album: 90 Millas), Gloria Estefan (Winner)
- Latin Grammy, 2008, Best Tropical Song, (Song: Pintame de Colores), Gloria Estefan (Winner)
- Latin Grammy, 2009, Best Tropical Song, (Song: No vale la pena), Issac Delgado (Nominee)
- Latin Grammy, 2011, (Album: Homenaje a los Rumberos), Edwin Bonilla (Nominee)
- Grammy, 2012, (Album: Homenaje a los Rumberos), Edwin Bonilla (Nominee)
- Latin Grammy, 2012, Best Tropical Contemporary Album, (Album: Caminos), Gaitanes (Nominee)
- Latin Grammy, 2017, Best Tropical Contemporary Album, (Album: La Parranda de Gaitanes), Gaitanes (Nominee)

== Billboard ==
- Muy dentro de Mi, Marc Anthony, 2000 (# 1)
- Ay Bueno, Fernandito Villalona, 2002 (# 1)
- Dame otro tequila, Paulina Rubio (# 1)
- Mia, Paulina Rubio, 2004 (# 5)
- Llore Llore, Victor Manuelle, 2004 (# 1)
- Tengo Ganas, Victor Manuelle, 2004 (As Producers) (# 1)
- No Llores, Gloria Estefan, 2007 (# 1)
- Me odio, Gloria Estefan, 2008
- No vale la pena, Issac Delgado, 2008 (# 2)
- De que me vale, Gaitanes feat. Willie Colón, 2015 (# 25)

== Decorations ==
Keys to the city (Llaves de la ciudad) - Panamá, Dec. 2008.

Music Composer Day - Panamá, Sept. 24, 2016

== Gaitan Bros Productions S.A. (Panamá) ==
Event producer Company founded by Ricardo & Alberto Gaitan with his family. Events have been held since 2007. Among the events held, stand Raul Diblassio & Richard Clayderman, Luis Enrique with Gaitanes and Omar Alfanno, SALSA The Festival and The Kings Tour with Willie Colón, Oscar D'León, Tito Nieves, Victor Manuelle, Issac Delgado, India and Rey Ruiz, under the musical direction of Cucco Peña, Alejandro Sanz Panamá Tour, Elton John and many more.

== Stereo 5000 Sonido y Luces S.A. (Panamá) ==
Sound and Light Company founded by his parents. The company has over 25 years of being # 1 in Panama. Most of the shows in Panama are made by the company.

== Gaitan Bros Recording Studios ==
Recording Studio located in Miami Florida, where they make all their productions.
