= Vocalstyle Music Company =

American piano roll manufacturer

The Vocalstyle Music Company of Cincinnati, Ohio was one of the foremost manufacturers of piano rolls. Founded around 1906, they were the first company to conceive of the idea of printing song lyrics on the piano roll so they could be viewed and sung as the music played. They patented this idea and collected royalties from all other music roll companies that printed lyrics.

They had a huge stable of artists, and jazz legends Jelly Roll Morton, Clarence Jones, and Luckey Roberts were probably the most prominent of their visiting recording artists. Other prominent musicians who recorded for Vocalstyle include Amanda Randolph, (Mandy Randolph-The Yellow Dog Blues, by W. C. Handy in 1919, Vocalstyle roll # 11562) who in later life became a well-known television actress, Art Gillham, and Ernest Ball.

They were purchased by the QRS company in 1926, and ceased operations in 1928.
