= List of awards and nominations received by Prince Royce =

Prince Royce awards and nominations
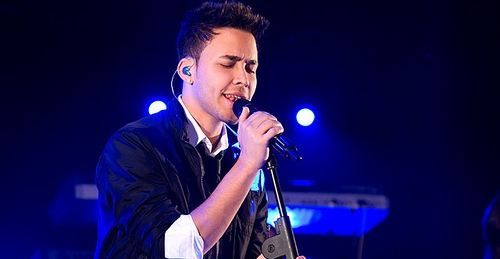
- Prince Royce promoting Acceso Total for Walmart
Awards and nominations
Award	Wins	Nominations
Latin Grammy Awards	0	15
Billboard Music Awards	0	10
Billboard Latin Music Awards	19	42
American Music Awards	0	1
BMI Awards	9	9
Premios Juventud	18	50
Premio Lo Nuestro	21	49
MTV Video Music Awards	0	1
Soberano Awards	2	12
Latin American Music Awards	6	9

Totals (Note: Certain award groups do not simply award one winner. They acknowledge several different recipients, have runners-up, and have third place. Since this is a specific recognition and is different from losing an award, runner-up mentions are considered wins in this award tally. For simplification and to avoid errors, each award in this list has been presumed to have had a prior nomination.)
- Wins: 75
- Nominations: 153

Prince Royce is an American singer-songwriter who has received awards and nominations for his contributions to the music industry, in the genre of bachata. His eponymous debut studio album has sold over 500,000 copies in the United States. It received a Latin Grammy Award nomination for Best Contemporary Tropical Album, gaining Royce his first Latin Grammy Award nomination in 2011. It followed up with two nominations for Tropical Album of the Year at the Billboard Music Awards in 2011 and 2012. At the Latin counterpart, it received two nominations for Tropical Album of the Year in 2011 and 2012, both of which he won. The album also won Album of the Year at the 2012 award show. A number of the singles from the album also received awards and nominations at the award shows including "Stand By Me", "Corazón Sin Cara", "El Amor Que Perdimos" and "Mi Última Carta".

Prince Royce's second studio album, Phase II (2012) has sold over 250,000 copies in the United States. At the Latin Grammy Awards of 2012, the album received a nomination for Best Tropical Fusion Album. The album also received a Billboard Music Award for Latin Album of the Year and Billboard Latin Music Award nomination for Album of the Year. Its two singles, "Las Cosas Pequeñas" and "Incondicional", were also successful in garnering awards and nominations. At the Billboard Latin Music Awards of 2013, the two singles were nominated for Tropical Song of the Year, which was eventually won by the former. As of October 2013, Royce has received 75 awards from 153 nominations.

== Awards and nominations ==
Award/organization	Year	Nominee/work	Category	Result	Ref.
American Music Awards	2013	Himself	Favorite Latin Artist	Nominated	
Billboard Music Awards	2011	Himself	Top Latin Artist	Nominated	
Billboard Music Awards	2011	Prince Royce	Top Latin Album	Nominated	
Billboard Music Awards	2012	Himself	Top Latin Artist	Nominated	
Billboard Music Awards	2012	Prince Royce	Top Latin Album	Nominated	
Billboard Music Awards	2012	"Corazón Sin Cara"	Top Latin Song	Nominated	
Billboard Music Awards	2013	Himself	Top Latin Artist	Nominated	
Billboard Music Awards	2013	Phase II	Top Latin Album	Nominated	
Billboard Music Awards	2014	Himself	Top Latin Artist	Nominated	
Billboard Music Awards	2014	Soy el Mismo	Top Latin Album	Nominated	
Billboard Music Awards	2014	"Darte un Beso"	Top Latin Song	Nominated	
Billboard Music Awards	2015	Himself	Top Latin Artist	Nominated	
Billboard Latin Music Awards	2011	Himself	Latin Artist of the Year, New	Won	
Billboard Latin Music Awards	2011	Himself	Hot Latin Songs Artist of the Year, Male	Nominated	
Billboard Latin Music Awards	2011	Himself	Top Latin Albums Artist of the Year, Male	Nominated	
Billboard Latin Music Awards	2011	Himself	Tropical Airplay Artist of the Year, Solo	Won	
Billboard Latin Music Awards	2011	Himself	Tropical Albums Artist of the Year, Solo	Won	
Billboard Latin Music Awards	2011	Prince Royce	Tropical Album of the Year	Won	
Billboard Latin Music Awards	2012	Himself	Hot Latin Songs Artist of the Year	Won	
Billboard Latin Music Awards	2012	Himself	Hot Latin Songs Artist of the Year, Male	Nominated	
Billboard Latin Music Awards	2012	Himself	Top Latin Albums Artist of the Year, Male	Nominated	
Billboard Latin Music Awards	2012	Himself	Tropical Song Artist of the Year, Solo	Won	
Billboard Latin Music Awards	2012	Himself	Tropical Album Artist of the Year, Solo	Won	
Billboard Latin Music Awards	2012	"Corazón Sin Cara"	Song of the Year	Nominated	
Billboard Latin Music Awards	2012	"Corazón Sin Cara"	Airplay Song of the Year	Nominated	
Billboard Latin Music Awards	2012	"Corazón Sin Cara"	Tropical Song of the Year	Won	
Billboard Latin Music Awards	2012	Prince Royce	Album of the Year	Won	
Billboard Latin Music Awards	2012	Prince Royce	Tropical Album of the Year	Won	
Billboard Latin Music Awards	2013	Himself	Artist of the Year	Nominated	
Billboard Latin Music Awards	2013	Himself	Songs Artist of the Year, Male	Nominated	
Billboard Latin Music Awards	2013	Himself	Albums Artist of the Year, Male	Won	
Billboard Latin Music Awards	2013	Himself	Tropical Songs Artist of the Year, Solo	Won	
Billboard Latin Music Awards	2013	Himself	Tropical Albums Artist of the Year, Solo	Won	
Billboard Latin Music Awards	2013	Phase II			
Billboard Latin Music Awards	2013	Phase II	Album of the Year	Nominated	
Billboard Latin Music Awards	2013	Phase II	Digital Album of the Year	Nominated	
Billboard Latin Music Awards	2013	Phase II	Tropical Album of the Year	Nominated	
Billboard Latin Music Awards	2013	"Incondicional"	Tropical Song of the Year	Won	
Billboard Latin Music Awards	2013	"Las Cosas Pequeñas"	Tropical Song of the Year	Nominated	
Billboard Latin Music Awards	2014	Himself	Artist of the Year	Nominated	
Billboard Latin Music Awards	2014	Himself	Hot Latin Songs Artist of the Year, Male	Won	
Billboard Latin Music Awards	2014	Himself	Social Artist of the Year, Solo	Nominated	
Billboard Latin Music Awards	2014	Himself	Top Latin Albums Artist of the Year, Male	Nominated	
Billboard Latin Music Awards	2014	Himself	Latin Pop Songs Artist of the Year, Solo	Won	
Billboard Latin Music Awards	2014	Himself	Tropical Songs Artist of the Year, Solo	Won	
Billboard Latin Music Awards	2014	Himself	Tropical Albums Artist of the Year, Solo	Nominated	
Billboard Latin Music Awards	2014	"Darte un Beso"	Hot Latin Song of the Year	Nominated	
Billboard Latin Music Awards	2014	"Darte un Beso"	Airplay Song of the Year	Nominated	
Billboard Latin Music Awards	2014	"Darte un Beso"	Digital Song of the Year	Nominated	
Billboard Latin Music Awards	2014	"Darte un Beso"	Streaming Song of the Year	Won	
Billboard Latin Music Awards	2014	"Darte un Beso"	Latin Pop Song of the Year	Nominated	
Billboard Latin Music Awards	2014	"Darte un Beso"	Tropical Song of the Year	Nominated	
Billboard Latin Music Awards	2014	"Te Perdiste Mi Amor" (with Thalía)	Hot Latin Song of the Year, Vocal Event	Nominated	
Billboard Latin Music Awards	2014	#1's	Tropical Album of the Year	Nominated	
Billboard Latin Music Awards	2014	Soy el Mismo	Tropical Album of the Year	Nominated	
Billboard Latin Music Awards	2015	Himself	Artist of the Year	Nominated	
Billboard Latin Music Awards	2015	Himself	Hot Latin Songs Artist of the Year, Male	Nominated	
Billboard Latin Music Awards	2015	Himself	Tropical Songs Artist of the Year, Solo	Nominated	
Billboard Latin Music Awards	2015	Himself	Tropical Albums Artist of the Year, Solo:	Nominated	
Billboard Latin Music Awards	2016	Himself	Artist of the Year	Nominated	
Billboard Latin Music Awards	2016	Himself	Tropical Songs Artist of the Year, Solo	Nominated	
Billboard Latin Music Awards	2017	Himself	Tropical Songs Artist of the Year, Solo	Won	
Billboard Latin Music Awards	2017	“La Carretera”	Airplay Song of the Year	Nominated	
Billboard Latin Music Awards	2017	“La Carretera”	Tropical Song of the Year	Nominated	
Billboard Latin Music Awards	2018	Himself	Tropical Songs Artist of the Year, Solo	Nominated	
Billboard Latin Music Awards	2018	“Déjà Vu” (with Shakira)	Tropical Song of the Year	Won	
Billboard Latin Music Awards	2018	Five	Tropical Album of the Year	Nominated	
Billboard Latin Music Awards	2019	Himself	Tropical Artist of the Year	Nominated	
Billboard Latin Music Awards	2020	Himself	Tropical Artist of the Year	Nominated	
Billboard Latin Music Awards	2021	Himself	Tropical Artist of the Year	Won	
Billboard Latin Music Awards	2021	Alter Ego	Tropical Album of the Year	Won	
Billboard Latin Music Awards	2021	"Carita de Inocente"	Tropical Song of the Year	Won	
Billboard Latin Music Awards	2021	"Carita de Inocente"	Airplay Song of the Year	Nominated	
Billboard Latin Music Awards	2021	"Lotería"	Tropical Song of the Year	Nominated	
Billboard Latin Music Awards	2022	Himself	Tropical Artist of the Year, Solo	Nominated	
Billboard Latin Music Awards	2023	Himself	Tropical Artist of the Year, Solo	Nominated	
Billboard Latin Music Awards	2024	Himself	Tropical Artist of the Year, Solo	Nominated	
Billboard Latin Music Awards	2024	Llamada Perdida	Tropical Album of the Year	Nominated	
Billboard Latin Music Awards	2024	"Cosas de la Peda" (with Gabito Ballesteros)	Tropical Song of the Year	Won	
Billboard Latin Music Awards	2025	Himself	Tropical Artist of the Year, Solo	Nominated	
Billboard Latin Music Awards	2025	Eterno	Tropical Album of the Year	Nominated	
Billboard Latin Music Awards	2026	Himself	Tropical Artist of the Year, Solo	Nominated	
Billboard Latin Music Awards	2026	Better Late Than Never	Top Tropical Album of the Year	Won	
Billboard Latin Music Awards	2026	"Lokita Por Mi" (with Romeo Santos)	Latin Airplay Song of the Year	Won	
Billboard Latin Music Awards	2026	"Lokita Por Mi" (with Romeo Santos)	Tropical Song of the Year	Won	
Billboard Latin Music Awards	2026	"Dardos" (with Romeo Santos)	Latin Airplay Song of the Year	Nominated	
Billboard Latin Music Awards	2026	"Dardos" (with Romeo Santos)	Tropical Song of the Year	Nominated	
Billboard Latin Music Awards	2026	"I Want It That Way"	Latin Airplay Song of the Year	Nominated	
Billboard Latin Music Awards	2026	"I Want It That Way"	Tropical Song of the Year	Nominated	
BMI Latin Awards	2012	"Corazón Sin Cara"	Award-Winning Songs	Won	
BMI Latin Awards	2013	Himself	Latin Songwriter of the Year	Won	
BMI Latin Awards	2013	"El Amor Que Perdimos"	Award-Winning Songs	Won	
BMI Latin Awards	2013	"Mi Última Carta"	Award-Winning Songs	Won	
BMI Latin Awards	2013	"Ven Conmigo" (Daddy Yankee featuring Prince Royce)	Award-Winning Songs	Won	
BMI Latin Awards	2013	"Las Cosas Pequeñas"	Award-Winning Songs	Won	
BMI Latin Awards	2014	"Incondicional"	Award-Winning Songs	Won	
BMI Latin Awards	2014	"Te Me Vas"	Award-Winning Songs	Won	
BMI Latin Awards	2014	"Te Perdiste Mi Amor"	Award-Winning Songs	Won	
Heat Latin Music Awards	2015	Himself	Best Tropical Artist	Nominated	
Heat Latin Music Awards	2017	Himself	Best Artist North	Nominated	
Heat Latin Music Awards	2019	"Sensualidad" (with Bad Bunny & J Balvin)	Best Collaboration	Nominated	
Heat Latin Music Awards	2021	Himself	Best Male Artist	Nominated	
Heat Latin Music Awards	2021	Himself	Best Tropical Artist	Won	
Heat Latin Music Awards	2021	"Antes Que Salga El Sol" (with Natti Natasha)	Best Collaboration	Nominated	
Heat Latin Music Awards	2022	Himself	Best Male Artist	Nominated	
Heat Latin Music Awards	2022	"After Party" (with Alex Sensation, Farruko, Mariah Angeliq & Kevin Lyttle)	Best Collaboration	Nominated	
Heat Latin Music Awards	2023	Himself	Best Male Artist	Nominated	
Heat Latin Music Awards	2024	Himself	Best Tropical Artist	Nominated	
Heat Latin Music Awards	2025	Himself	Best Tropical Artist	Nominated	
Heat Latin Music Awards	2026	Himself	Best Tropical Artist	Nominated	
Heat Latin Music Awards	2026	"Dardos" (with Romeo Santos)	Best Music Video	Nominated	
iHeartRadio Music Awards	2017	Himself	Latin Artist of the Year	Nominated	
iHeartRadio Music Awards	2017	"La Carretera"	Latin Song of the Year	Nominated	
Latin American Music Awards	2015	"Solita"	Favorite Tropical Song	Nominated	
Latin American Music Awards	2015	"Back It Up" (with Jennifer Lopez)	Favorite Dance Song	Nominated	
Latin American Music Awards	2016	"Culpa Al Corazón"	Favorite Tropical Song	Won	
Latin American Music Awards	2016	Himself	Favorite Tropical Artist	Won	
Latin American Music Awards	2017	"Deja Vu" (with Shakira)	Song of the Year	Won	
Latin American Music Awards	2017	"Deja Vu" (with Shakira)	Favorite Tropical Song	Won	
Latin American Music Awards	2017	Five	Album of the Year	Nominated	
Latin American Music Awards	2017	Five	Favorite Tropical Album	Won	
Latin American Music Awards	2017	Himself	Favorite Tropical Artist	Won	
Latin American Music Awards	2019	"Adicto" (with Marc Anthony)	Favorite Tropical Song	Won	
Latin American Music Awards	2021	Himself	Favorite Tropical Artist	Nominated	
Latin American Music Awards	2021	Alter Ego	Favorite Tropical Album	Won	
Latin American Music Awards	2021	"Carita de Inocente"	Favorite Tropical Song	Won	
Latin American Music Awards	2022	Himself	Favorite Tropical Artist	Nominated	
Latin American Music Awards	2022	“Lao' a Lao'’	Favorite Tropical Song	Nominated	
Latin American Music Awards	2023	Himself	Pioneer Award	Won	
Latin American Music Awards	2023	Himself	Favorite Tropical Artist	Nominated	
Latin American Music Awards	2023	Te Espero (with Maria Becerra)	Collaboration Of The Year	Nominated	
Latin American Music Awards	2023	Te Espero (with Maria Becerra)	Best Collaboration – Tropical	Nominated	
Latin American Music Awards	2024	Himself	Favorite Tropical Artist	Nominated	
Latin American Music Awards	2024	"Me EnRD"	Favorite Tropical Song	Nominated	
Latin Grammy Awards	2010	Prince Royce	Best Contemporary Tropical Album	Nominated	
Latin Grammy Awards	2011	"Ven Conmigo" (with Daddy Yankee)	Best Urban Song	Nominated	
Latin Grammy Awards	2012	Phase II	Best Tropical Fusion Album	Nominated	
Latin Grammy Awards	2014	"Darte un Beso"	Record of the Year	Nominated	
Latin Grammy Awards	2014	"Darte un Beso"	Song of the Year	Nominated	
Latin Grammy Awards	2014	"Darte un Beso"	Best Tropical Song	Nominated	
Latin Grammy Awards	2014	Soy el Mismo	Best Contemporary Tropical Album	Nominated	
Latin Grammy Awards	2015	"Back It Up (Spanish Version)"	Best Urban Song	Nominated	
Latin Grammy Awards	2016	"La Carretera"	Best Tropical Song	Nominated	
Latin Grammy Awards	2017	El Dorado (as a featured artist)	Album of the Year	Nominated	
Latin Grammy Awards	2017	Five	Best Contemporary Tropical Album	Nominated	
Latin Grammy Awards	2017	"Deja Vu" (with Shakira)	Best Tropical Song	Nominated	
Latin Grammy Awards	2018	"Sensualidad" (with Bad Bunny & J Balvin)	Best Urban Song	Nominated	
Latin Grammy Awards	2020	Alter Ego	Best Contemporary Tropical Album	Nominated	
Latin Grammy Awards	2024	Llamada Perdida	Best Merengue/Bachata Album	Nominated	
Latin Songwriters Hall of Fame	2013	Himself	La Musa Award	Won	
LOS40 Music Awards	2015	Himself	Best Latin Act	Nominated	
LOS40 Music Awards	2026	Himself	Best Latin Artist or Group	Nominated	
LOS40 Music Awards	2026	Himself	Best Latin Live Artist or Group	Nominated	
LOS40 Music Awards	2026	"Dardos" (with Romeo Santos)	Best Latin Song	Won	
LOS40 Music Awards	2026	Better Late Than Never	Best Latin Album	Won	
LOS40 Music Awards	2026	Mejor Tarde Que Nunca Tour	Best Latin Tour or Concert	Nominated	
Los Premios 40 Principales América	2014	Himself	Best Dominican Act	Nominated	
Los Premios 40 Principales América	2014	Soy El Mismo	Best Spanish Language Album	Nominated	
Los Premios 40 Principales América	2014	"Darte un Beso"	Best Spanish Language Song	Nominated	
MTV Millennial Awards	2018	"Sensualidad" (with Bad Bunny & J Balvin)	Collaboration of the Year	Nominated	
MTV Video Music Awards	2011	Himself	Best Latino Artist	Nominated	
Premios Juventud	2011	Himself	Favorite Tropical Artist	Won	
Premios Juventud	2011	Himself	Best Artist	Won	
Premios Juventud	2011	Himself	Follow me The Good	Nominated	
Premios Juventud	2011	"Corazón Sin Cara"	Catchiest Tune	Nominated	
Premios Juventud	2011	"Corazón Sin Cara"	My Favorite Video	Won	
Premios Juventud	2011	"Corazón Sin Cara"	Best Ballad	Nominated	
Premios Juventud	2011	"Corazón Sin Cara"	My Ringtone	Nominated	
Premios Juventud	2011	Stand by Me Tour	My Favorite Concert	Won	
Premios Juventud	2012	"El Verdadero Amor Perdona" (with Maná)	The Perfect Combination	Nominated	
Premios Juventud	2012	"Ven Conmigo" (with Daddy Yankee)	The Perfect Combination	Nominated	
Premios Juventud	2012	Euphoria (with Enrique Iglesias and Pitbull)	My Favorite Concert	Won	
Premios Juventud	2012	"Las Cosas Pequeñas"	Catchiest Tune	Won	
Premios Juventud	2012	"Las Cosas Pequeñas"	Best Ballad	Won	
Premios Juventud	2012	"Las Cosas Pequeñas"	My Favorite Video	Won	
Premios Juventud	2012	"Las Cosas Pequeñas"	My Ringtone	Won	
Premios Juventud	2012	Himself	Favorite Tropical Artist	Won	
Premios Juventud	2012	Himself	All Over the Dial	Won	
Premios Juventud	2012	Himself	Follow Me The Good	Won	
Premios Juventud	2013	"Te Perdiste Mi Amor" (with Thalía)	The Perfect Combination	Nominated	
Premios Juventud	2013	Himself	Favorite Tropical Artist	Won	
Premios Juventud	2013	Himself	Voice of the Moment	Won	
Premios Juventud	2013	Himself	Follow Me The Good	Nominated	
Premios Juventud	2013	"Incondicional"	Catchiest Tune	Won	
Premios Juventud	2013	"Incondicional"	My Favorite Video	Won	
Premios Juventud	2013	"Incondicional"	Best Ballad	Nominated	
Premios Juventud	2013	"Incondicional"	My Ringtone	Nominated	
Premios Juventud	2013	Phase II	I Play It All	Won	
Premios Juventud	2013	Phase II Tour	My Favorite Concert	Nominated	
Premios Juventud	2014	Soy el Mismo	Favorite Album	Nominated	
Premios Juventud	2014	"Darte un Beso"	Favorite Song	Nominated	
Premios Juventud	2014	"Te Robaré"	Favorite Song	Nominated	
Premios Juventud	2014	"Darte un Beso"	My Favorite Video	Nominated	
Premios Juventud	2014	"Te Robaré"	My Favorite Video	Nominated	
Premios Juventud	2014	"Nada"	My Favorite Video	Nominated	
Premios Juventud	2014	"Darte un Beso"	Favorite Ringtone	Nominated	
Premios Juventud	2014	"Te Robaré"	Favorite Ringtone	Nominated	
Premios Juventud	2014	Himself	Favorite Hispanic Tropical Artist	Nominated	
Premios Juventud	2014	Himself	Favorite Personality in Social Media	Won	
Premios Juventud	2014	Himself	Favorite Artist	Nominated	
Premios Juventud	2015	Himself	Artist of the Moment	Nominated	
Premios Juventud	2015	Himself	Favorite Tropical Artist	Won	
Premios Juventud	2015	Soy el Mismo Tour	Super Tour	Nominated	
Premios Juventud	2015	Stuck on a Feeling" (with Snoop Dogg)	Favorite Hit	Nominated	
Premios Juventud	2016	"Back it Up" (with Jennifer Lopez & Pitbull)	Best Collaboration	Nominated	
Premios Juventud	2016	Himself	Favorite Tropical Artist	Nominated	
Premios Juventud	2016	Himself	Favorite Twitter	Nominated	
Premios Juventud	2019	Himself and Emeraude Toubia	Best Couple	Nominated	
Premios Juventud	2020	"Color Esperanza (2020)" (with Various Artists)	The Quarentune	Nominated	
Premios Juventud	2021	Himself	Male Youth Artist of the Year	Nominated	
Premios Juventud	2021	Alter Ego	Album of the Year	Nominated	
Premios Juventud	2021	"Carita de Inocente"	Song of the Year	Nominated	
Premios Juventud	2021	"Antes Que Salga el Sol" (with Natti Natasha)	The Stickiest	Nominated	
Premios Juventud	2021	"Antes Que Salga el Sol" (with Natti Natasha)	Tropical Mix	Nominated	
Premios Juventud	2022	"Lao’ A Lao"	The Catchiest Song	Nominated	
Premios Juventud	2022	"Lao’ A Lao"	Best Tropical Hit	Nominated	
Premios Juventud	2022	Te Espero (with Maria Becerra)	Best Tropical Mix	Won	
Premios Juventud	2023	"Le Doy 20 Mil" (with El Alfa)	Best Dembow Collaboration	Nominated	
Premios Juventud	2023	"Otra Vez"	Best Tropical Hit	Nominated	
Premios Juventud	2023	"Si Te Preguntan..." (with Nicky Jam & Jay Wheeler)	Best Tropical Mix	Nominated	
Premios Juventud	2024	"Cosas de la Peda" (with Gabito Ballesteros)	The Perfect Mix	Nominated	
Premios Juventud	2024	"Me EnRD"	Best Tropical Hit	Nominated	
Premios Juventud	2024	Llamada Perdida	Best Tropical Album	Won	
Premios Juventud	2025	"How Deep Is Your Love"	Tropical Hit	Nominated	
Premios Juventud	2025	Eterno	Best Tropical Album	Nominated	
Premios Juventud	2026	Better Late Than Never	Album of the Year	Nominated	
Premios Juventud	2026	Better Late Than Never	Best Tropical Album	Won	
Premios Juventud	2026	Mejor Tarde Que Nunca Tour	Best Tour	Nominated	
Premios Juventud	2026	"Dardos" (with Romeo Santos)	Tropical Hit	Won	
Premios Juventud	2026	"Lokita Por Mi" (with Romeo Santos)	Tropical Mix	Won	
Premios Lo Nuestro	2011	Prince Royce	Tropical Album of the Year	Nominated	
Premios Lo Nuestro	2011	"Stand by Me"	Tropical Song of the Year	Won	
Premios Lo Nuestro	2011	Himself	Tropical Male Artist of the Year	Won	
Premios Lo Nuestro	2011	Himself	Breakout Artist or Group of the Year	Won	
Premios Lo Nuestro	2011	Himself	Tropical Traditional Artist of the Year	Nominated	
Premios Lo Nuestro	2012	"Ven Conmigo" (with Daddy Yankee)	Collaboration of the Year	Won	
Premios Lo Nuestro	2012	"El Amor Que Perdimos"	Tropical Song of the Year	Won	
Premios Lo Nuestro	2012	"Ven Conmigo" (with Daddy Yankee)	Urban Song of the Year	Nominated	
Premios Lo Nuestro	2012	Himself	Tropical Male Artist of the Year	Won	
Premios Lo Nuestro	2012	Himself	Tropical Traditional Artist of the Year	Won	
Premios Lo Nuestro	2013	"El Verdadero Amor Perdona" (with Maná)	Collaboration of the Year	Won	
Premios Lo Nuestro	2013	"El Verdadero Amor Perdona" (with Maná)	Rock/Alternative Song of the Year	Won	
Premios Lo Nuestro	2013	Phase II	Tropical Album of the Year	Won	
Premios Lo Nuestro	2013	"Las Cosas Pequeñas"	Tropical Song of the Year	Nominated	
Premios Lo Nuestro	2013	"Incondicional"	Tropical Song of the Year	Won	
Premios Lo Nuestro	2013	Himself	Tropical Male Artist of the Year	Won	
Premios Lo Nuestro	2013	Himself	Tropical Traditional Artist of the Year	Won	
Premios Lo Nuestro	2014	"Te Perdiste Mi Amor" (with Thalía)	Pop Song of the Year	Nominated	
Premios Lo Nuestro	2014	"Te Me Vas"	Tropical Song of the Year	Nominated	
Premios Lo Nuestro	2014	Himself	Artist of the Year	Won	
Premios Lo Nuestro	2014	Himself	Tropical Male Artist of the Year	Won	
Premios Lo Nuestro	2014	Himself	Tropical Traditional Artist of the Year	Won	
Premios Lo Nuestro	2015	Soy el Mismo (Deluxe Edition)	Tropical Album of the Year	Nominated	
Premios Lo Nuestro	2015	"Darte un Beso"	Tropical Song of the Year	Nominated	
Premios Lo Nuestro	2015	"Te Robaré"	Tropical Song of the Year	Nominated	
Premios Lo Nuestro	2015	Himself	Tropical Male Artist of the Year	Nominated	
Premios Lo Nuestro	2015	Himself	Tropical Traditional Artist of the Year	Nominated	
Premios Lo Nuestro	2016	Soy el Mismo (Deluxe Edition)	Tropical Album of the Year	Won	
Premios Lo Nuestro	2016	"Soy el Mismo"	Tropical Song of the Year	Won	
Premios Lo Nuestro	2016	Himself	Tropical Artist of the Year	Nominated	
Premios Lo Nuestro	2016	Himself	Tropical Male Artist of the Year	Nominated	
Premios Lo Nuestro	2017	"Solo Yo" (with Sofía Reyes)	Pop Song of the Year	Nominated	
Premios Lo Nuestro	2017	"Culpa al Corazón"	Tropical Song of the Year	Nominated	
Premios Lo Nuestro	2017	"La Carretera"	Tropical Song of the Year	Nominated	
Premios Lo Nuestro	2017	Himself	Tropical Artist of the Year	Won	
Premios Lo Nuestro	2021	Alter Ego	Album of the Year	Nominated	
Premios Lo Nuestro	2021	"Carita de Inocente"	Song of the Year	Nominated	
Premios Lo Nuestro	2021	"Carita de Inocente"	Tropical Song of the Year	Nominated	
Premios Lo Nuestro	2021	Himself	Tropical Artist of the Year	Nominated	
Premios Lo Nuestro	2022	"Antes Que Salga El Sol" (with Natti Natasha)	Perfect Mix of The Year	Nominated	
Premios Lo Nuestro	2022	"Ayer Me Llamó Mi Ex’ (Remix)" (with Khea & Natti Natasha)	Remix of the Year	Won	
Premios Lo Nuestro	2022	"Ayer Me Llamó Mi Ex’ (Remix)" (with Khea & Natti Natasha)	Urban Collaboration of the Year	Nominated	
Premios Lo Nuestro	2022	"Ayer Me Llamó Mi Ex’ (Remix)" (with Khea & Natti Natasha)	Urban Song of the Year	Nominated	
Premios Lo Nuestro	2022	"Ayer Me Llamó Mi Ex’ (Remix)" (with Khea & Natti Natasha)	Urban/Pop Song of the Year	Nominated	
Premios Lo Nuestro	2022	"Lotería"	Urban/Pop Song of the Year	Nominated	
Premios Lo Nuestro	2022	Himself	Tropical Artist of the Year	Nominated	
Premios Lo Nuestro	2023	"Te Espero" (with Maria Becerra)	The Perfect Mix of the Year	Nominated	
Premios Lo Nuestro	2023	"Te Espero" (with Maria Becerra)	Tropical Collaboration of the Year	Won	
Premios Lo Nuestro	2023	"Lao' a Lao'"	Tropical Song of the Year	Nominated	
Premios Lo Nuestro	2023	Himself	Artist of the Year	Nominated	
Premios Lo Nuestro	2023	Himself	Tropical Artist of the Year	Nominated	
Premios Lo Nuestro	2024	"Me EnRD"	Tropical Song of the Year	Nominated	
Premios Lo Nuestro	2024	"Me EnRD"	Song of the Year	Nominated	
Premios Lo Nuestro	2024	Himself	Tropical Artist of the Year	Nominated	
Premios Lo Nuestro	2025	Llamada Perdida	Album of the Year	Nominated	
Premios Lo Nuestro	2025	Llamada Perdida	Tropical Album of the Year	Nominated	
Premios Lo Nuestro	2025	Himself	Tropical Artist of the Year	Nominated	
Premios Lo Nuestro	2025	"Cosas de la Peda" (with Gabito Ballesteros)	Song of the Year	Nominated	
Premios Lo Nuestro	2025	"Cosas de la Peda" (with Gabito Ballesteros)	The Perfect Mix of the Year	Nominated	
Premios Lo Nuestro	2025	"Cosas de la Peda" (with Gabito Ballesteros)	Tropical Collaboration of the Year	Nominated	
Premios Tu Mundo	2012	Himself	#MostSocial	Nominated	
Premios Tu Mundo	2012	"Las Cosas Pequeñas"	Song That Steals My Heart	Won	
Premios Tu Mundo	2013	Himself	#MostSocial	Nominated	
Premios Tu Mundo	2013	"Incondicional"	Most Popular Song of the Year	Won	
Premios Tu Mundo	2014	Himself	Favorite Tropical Artist	Won	
Premios Tu Mundo	2014	Himself	Fan Club of the Year	Nominated	
Premios Tu Mundo	2015	Himself	Favorite Pop Artist	Won	
Premios Tu Mundo	2016	Himself	Favorite Tropical Artist	Nominated	
Premios Tu Mundo	2016	Himself	Fan Club of the Year	Nominated	
Premios Tu Mundo	2017	Himself	Favorite Tropical Artist	Won	
Premios Tu Música Urbano	2022	Himself	Top Artist - Tropical Urban	Nominated	
Premios Tu Música Urbano	2023	Himself	Top Artist - Tropical Urban	Nominated	
Premios Tu Música Urbano	2023	"Si Te Preguntan..." (with Nicky Jam & Jay Wheeler)	Top Song - Tropical Urban	Won	
Premios Tu Música Urbano	2026	Himself	Top Artist - Tropical	Nominated	
Premios Tu Música Urbano	2026	"Dardos" (with Romeo Santos)	Collaboration of the Year	Won	
Premios Tu Música Urbano	2026	"Lokita Por Mi" (with Romeo Santos)	Top Song - Tropical	Nominated	
Premios Tu Música Urbano	2026	Better Late Than Never	Top Album - Tropical	Nominated	
Premios Tu Música Urbano	2026	Eterno	Top Album - Tropical	Nominated	
Rolling Stone en Español Awards	2026	"Ay! San Miguel" (with Romeo Santos)	Collaboration of the Year	Pending	
Soberano Awards	2011	Himself	New Artist of the Year	Won	
Soberano Awards	2011	Himself	Most-Played Artist on Radio	Nominated	
Soberano Awards	2011	Prince Royce	Album of the Year	Nominated	
Soberano Awards	2012	Himself	Concert of the Year	Nominated	
Soberano Awards	2012	Himself	Most-Played Artist on Radio	Won	
Soberano Awards	2012	"Mi Ultima Carta"	Bachata Song of the Year	Nominated	
Soberano Awards	2013	Himself	Most-Played Artist on Radio	Nominated	
Soberano Awards	2013	"Las Cosas Pequeñas"	Bachata Song of the Year	Nominated	
Soberano Awards	2013	Phase II	Album of the Year	Nominated	
Soberano Awards	2014	Himself	Most-Played Artist on Radio	Nominated	
Soberano Awards	2014	Himself	Composer of the Year	Nominated	
Soberano Awards	2014	"Darte un Beso"	Bachata Song of the Year	Nominated	
Soberano Awards	2018	Himself	Artist or Group living out of the Year	Nominated	
Soberano Awards	2018	"Deja Vu" (with Shakira)	Collaboration of the Year	Nominated	
Teen Choice Awards	2017	"Deja Vu" (with Shakira)	Choice Latin Song	Nominated	
