= List of awards and nominations received by Nicky Jam =

Nicky Jam awards and nominations
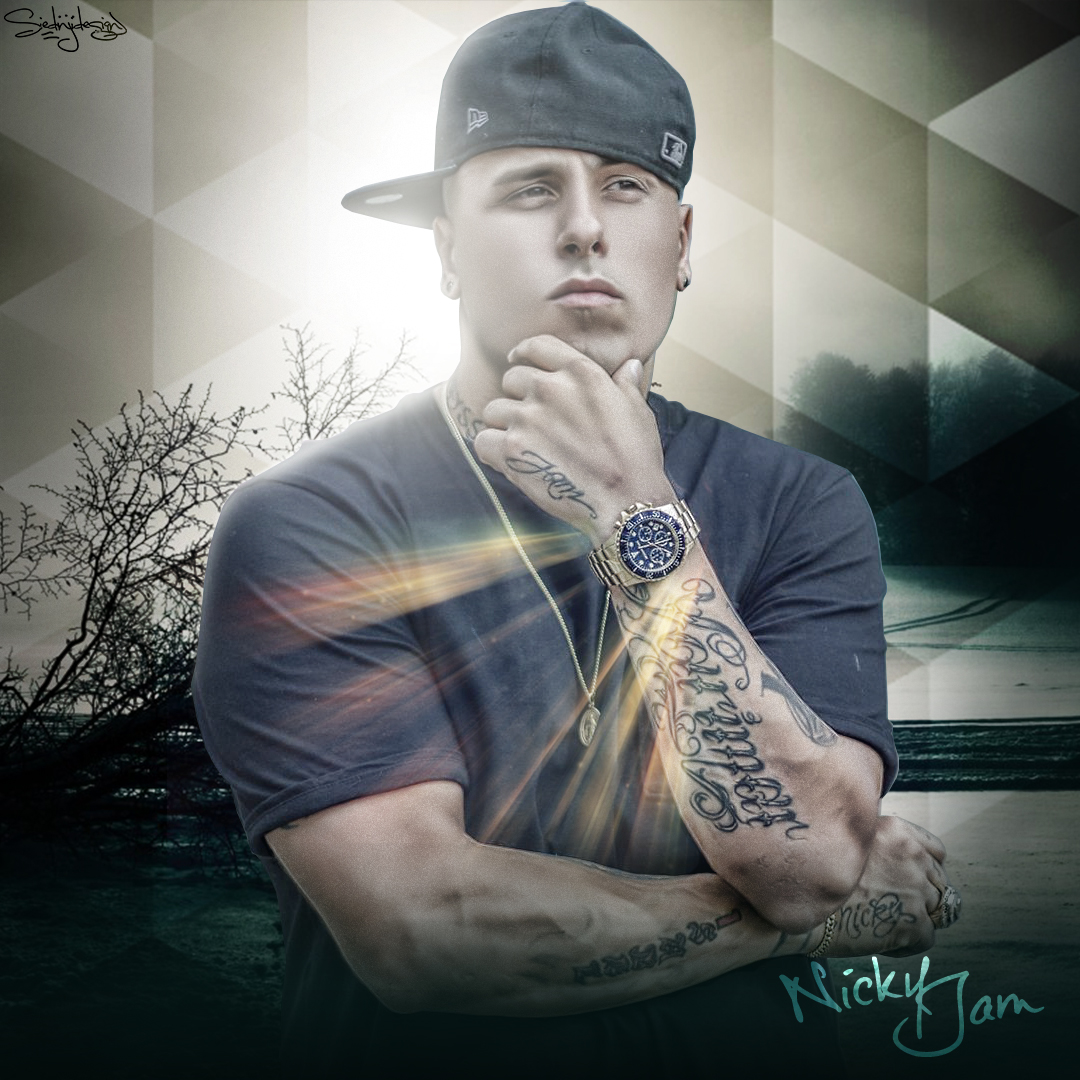
- Jam in 2013
Awards and nominations
Award	Wins	Nominations
American Music Awards	0	1
Billboard	1	2
Premio Lo Nuestro Awards	6	16
Billboard Latin Music Awards	18	25
iHeartRadio Music Awards	3	9
Latin American Music Awards	3	21
Latin Grammy Awards	1	4
Premios Juventud	2	9

Totals (Note: Certain award groups do not simply award one winner. They acknowledge several different recipients, have runners-up, and have third place. Since this is a specific recognition and is different from losing an award, runner-up mentions are considered wins in this award tally. For simplification and to avoid errors, each award in this list has been presumed to have had a prior nomination.)
- Wins: 39
- Nominations: 125

The following is a comprehensive list of awards received by American singer Nicky Jam. He received a total of 110 nominations and won 37 awards.

== American Music Awards ==
Year	Work/Nomination	Award	Result
2016	Himself	Favorite Latin Artist	Nominated

== Billboard Music Awards ==
Year	Work/Nomination	Award	Result
2016	Himself	Top Latin Artist	Nominated
2016	"El Perdón" (with Enrique Iglesias)	Top Latin Song	Won
2017	Himself	Top Latin Artist	Nominated
2017	"Hasta El Amanecer"	Top Latin Song	Won
2018	Fénix	Top Latin Album	Nominated
2019	"X" (with J Balvin)	Top Latin Song	Nominated
2019	"Te Boté (Remix)" (with Bad Bunny, Ozuna, Nio Garcia & Casper Magico)	Top Latin Song	Won
2020	"Otro Trago (Remix)" (with Sech, Ozuna, Darell & Anuel AA)	Top Latin Song	Nominated

== Billboard Latin Music Awards ==
The Billboard Latin Music Awards grew out of the Billboard Music Awards program from Billboard magazine, an industry publication charting the sales and radio airplay success of musical recordings. The Billboard awards are the Latin music industry's longest running award. The award ceremonies are held during the same week of the BillboardLatin Music Conference. The first award ceremony began in 1994. In addition to awards given on the basis of success on the Billboard charts, the ceremony includes the Spirit of Hope award for humanitarian achievements and the Lifetime Achievement award, as well as awards by the broadcasting partner. Nicky Jam has received 38 Nominations and won 15 awards from them

Year	Work/Nomination	Award	Result
2015	"Travesuras"	Latin Rhythm Song of the Year	Nominated
2016	Himself	Artist of the Year	Nominated
2016	Himself	Latin Rhythm Songs Artist of the Year, Solo	Won
2016	Himself	Hot Latin Songs Artist of the Year, Male	Nominated
2016	Himself	Songwriter of the Year	Nominated
2016	"El Perdón" (with Enrique Iglesias)	Hot Latin Song of the Year	Won
2016	"El Perdón" (with Enrique Iglesias)	Latin Rhythm Song of the Year	Won
2016	"El Perdón" (with Enrique Iglesias)	Airplay Song of the Year	Won
2016	"El Perdón" (with Enrique Iglesias)	Streaming Song of the Year	Won
2016	"El Perdón" (with Enrique Iglesias)	Hot Latin Song of the Year, Vocal Event	Won
2016	"El Perdón" (with Enrique Iglesias)	Digital Song of the Year	Won
2017	Himself	Artist of the Year	Nominated
2017	Himself	Hot Latin Songs Artist of the Year, Male	Won
2017	Himself	Latin Rhythm Songs Artist of the Year, Solo	Won
2017	"Hasta El Amanecer"	Hot Latin Song of the Year	Won
2017	"Hasta El Amanecer"	Airplay Song of the Year	Nominated
2017	"Hasta El Amanecer"	Digital Song of the Year	Won
2017	"Hasta El Amanecer"	Streaming Song of the Year	Won
2017	"Hasta El Amanecer"	Latin Rhythm Song of the Year	Won
2017	"Ya Me Enteré" (with Reik)	Latin Pop Song of the Year	Nominated
2018	Himself	Top Latin Albums Artist of the Year, Male	Nominated
2018	Himself	Latin Rhythm Artist of the Year, Solo	Nominated
2018	"El Amante"	Latin Rhythm Song of the Year	Nominated
2018	Fénix	Top Latin Album of the Year	Won
2018	Fénix	Latin Rhythm Album of the Year	Won
2019	"Te Boté (Remix)" (with Bad Bunny, Ozuna, Nio Garcia & Casper Magico)	Hot Latin Song of the Year	Won
2019	"Te Boté (Remix)" (with Bad Bunny, Ozuna, Nio Garcia & Casper Magico)	Hot Latin Song of the Year, Vocal Event	Won
2019	"Te Boté (Remix)" (with Bad Bunny, Ozuna, Nio Garcia & Casper Magico)	Airplay Song of the Year	Nominated
2019	"Te Boté (Remix)" (with Bad Bunny, Ozuna, Nio Garcia & Casper Magico)	Digital Song of the Year	Nominated
2019	"Te Boté (Remix)" (with Bad Bunny, Ozuna, Nio Garcia & Casper Magico)	Streaming Song of the Year	Won
2019	"Te Boté (Remix)" (with Bad Bunny, Ozuna, Nio Garcia & Casper Magico)	Latin Rhythm Song of the Year	Nominated
2019	"X" (with J Balvin)	Hot Latin Song of the Year	Nominated
2019	"X" (with J Balvin)	Hot Latin Song of the Year, Vocal Event	Nominated
2019	"X" (with J Balvin)	Airplay Song of the Year	Won
2019	"X" (with J Balvin)	Digital Song of the Year	Nominated
2019	"X" (with J Balvin)	Streaming Song of the Year	Nominated
2019	"X" (with J Balvin)	Latin Rhythm Song of the Year	Won
2019	"Cásate Conmigo" (with Silvestre Dangond)	Tropical Song of the Year	Nominated
2020	"Otro Trago (Remix)" (with Sech, Ozuna, Darell & Anuel AA)	Hot Latin Song of the Year	Nominated
2020	"Otro Trago (Remix)" (with Sech, Ozuna, Darell & Anuel AA)	Vocal Event Hot Latin Song of the Year	Nominated
2020	"Otro Trago (Remix)" (with Sech, Ozuna, Darell & Anuel AA)	Streaming Song of the Year	Nominated
2020	"Otro Trago (Remix)" (with Sech, Ozuna, Darell & Anuel AA)	Latin Rhythm Song of the Year	Nominated
2020	"Date La Vuelta"	Latin Pop Song of the Year	Nominated
2022	Himself	Hall of Fame	inducted

== Heat Latin Music Awards ==
Year	Work/Nomination	Award	Result	References
2016	Himself	Best Male Artist	Nominated	
2016	Himself	Best Urban Artist	Won	
2016	Himself	Best North Region Artist	Nominated	
2016	"El Perdón" (with Enrique Iglesias)	Best Video	Nominated	
2017	Himself	Best Urban Artist	Nominated	
2019	Himself	Best Male Artist	Nominated	
2019	Himself	Best Urban Artist	Nominated	
2020	Himself	Best Male Artist	Won	
2020	Himself	Best Urban Artist	Nominated	
2020	Himself	Best North Region Artist	Won	
2020	Himself	Gold Award	Won	
2021	Himself	Best Male Artist	Won	
2021	Himself	Best Urban Artist	Nominated	
2022	Himself	Best Urban Artist	Won	

== iHeartRadio Music Awards ==
Year	Work/Nomination	Award	Result
2016	"El Perdón" (with Enrique Iglesias)	Latin Song of the Year	Won
2016	Himself	Latin Artist of the Year	Nominated
2017	"De Pies A Cabeza" (with Maná)	Latin Song of the Year	Nominated
2017	"Ya Me Enteré" (with Reik)	Latin Song of the Year	Nominated
2017	"Hasta El Amanecer"	Best Music Video	Nominated
2017	Himself	Latin Artist of the Year	Won
2018	Himself	Latin Artist of the Year	Nominated
2018	"El Amante"	Latin Song of the Year	Nominated
2019	"X" (with J Balvin)	Latin Song of the Year	Won

== Latin American Music Awards ==
The Latin American Music Awards (Latin AMAs) is an annual American music award that is presented by Telemundo. It is the Spanish-language counterpart of the American Music Awards (AMAs) produced by the Dick Clark Productions. As with AMAs, the Latin AMAs are determined by a poll of the public and music buyers. Nicky Jam has won 3 awards from 21 nominations.

Year	Work/Nomination	Award	Result
2015	Himself	Artist of the Year	Nominated
2015	Himself	Favorite Urban Male Artist	Nominated
2015	"El Perdón" (with Enrique Iglesias)	Song of the Year	Won
2015	"El Perdón" (with Enrique Iglesias)	Favorite Collaboration	Won
2015	"El Perdón" (with Enrique Iglesias)	Favorite Streaming Song	Won
2016	Himself	Artist of the Year	Nominated
2016	Himself	Favorite Urban Artist	Nominated
2016	"Hasta el Amanecer"	Song of the Year	Nominated
2016	"Hasta el Amanecer"	Favorite Urban Song	Nominated
2017	Himself	Artist of the Year	Nominated
2017	Himself	Favorite Urban Artist	Nominated
2017	"El Amante"	Song of the Year	Nominated
2017	"El Amante"	Favorite Urban Song	Nominated
2018	Himself	Artist of the Year	Nominated
2018	Himself	Favorite Male Artist	Nominated
2018	"Fénix"	Album of the Year	Nominated
2018	"X" (with J Balvin)	Song of the Year	Nominated
2018	"X" (with J Balvin)	Favorite Urban Song	Nominated
2018	"Bella y Sensual" (with Romeo Santos & Daddy Yankee )	Favorite Tropical Song	Nominated
2018	"Cásate Conmigo" (with Silvestre Dangond)	Favorite Tropical Song	Nominated
2018	"Perro Fiel" (with Shakira)	Favorite Pop Song	Nominated

== Latin Grammy Awards ==
Year	Work/Nomination	Award	Result
2015	"El Perdón" (with Enrique Iglesias)	Best Urban Performance	Won
2015	"Una Cita (Remix)" (with Alkilados, J Alvarez & El Roockie)	Best Urban Performance	Nominated
2015	"Greatest Hits Vol 1"	Best Urban Music Album	Nominated
2017	Fénix	Album of the Year	Nominated
2017	"El Amante"	Best Urban Fusion/Performance	Nominated
2017	"El Amante"	Best Urban Song	Nominated
2018	"X" (with J Balvin)	Record of the Year	Nominated
2018	"X" (with J Balvin)	Best Urban Song	Nominated
2018	"Cásate Conmigo" (with Silvestre Dangond)	Best Tropical Song	Nominated
2025	"Dile a Él"	Best Reggaeton Performance	Pending

== LOS40 Music Awards ==
Year	Work/Nomination	Award	Result
2015	Himself	Best Latin Artist	Nominated
2016	"Hasta el Amanecer"	Global Show Award	Nominated
2018	Himself	Best Latin Artist	Nominated
2018	"X" (with J Balvin)	International Video of the Year	Nominated
2018	"X" (with J Balvin)	Global Show Award	Nominated
2019	Himself	Urban Award	Won
2022	Himself	Best Latin Urban Act or Producer	Nominated
2022	"Ojos Rojos"	Best Latin Video	Nominated
2024	"Ohnana (Remix)" (with Kapo, Maluma, Ryan Castro & Farruko)	Best Latin Collaboration	Nominated
2025	"Hiekka" (with Beéle)	Best Latin Urban Collaboration	Won
2025	Himself	Golden Icon Award	Won

== Lunas del Auditorio ==
Year	Work/Nomination	Award	Result	Ref
2017	Nicky Jam	Best Urban	Nominated	

== MTV Millennial Awards ==
Year	Work/Nomination	Award	Result
2016	Himself	Best performance in an app	Nominated
2016	Himself	Pop explosion of the year	Nominated
2016	"Hasta el Amanecer"	Hit of the year	Nominated
2017	"El Amante"	Best Party Anthem	Nominated

== NRJ Music Awards ==
Year	Work/Nomination	Award	Result
2015	Himself & Enrique Iglesias	International Group/Duo of the Year	Nominated

== People's Choice Awards ==
Year	Work/Nomination	Award	Result
2020	Himself	The Latin Artist of 2020	Nominated

== Premios Juventud ==
Year	Work/Nomination	Award	Result
2015	Himself	Mi artista Urbano	Nominated
2015	Himself	Síganme los buenos	Nominated
2015	"El Perdón" (with Enrique Iglesias)	La Combinación Perfecta (The Perfect Combo)	Nominated
2015	"El Perdón" (with Enrique Iglesias)	La Más Pegajosa (Catchiest Tune)	Nominated
2016	Himself	Voz del Momento	Won
2016	Himself	Mi Artista Urbano	Won
2016	"Sunset" (with Farruko & Shaggy)	La Combinación Perfecta	Nominated
2016	Fenix Tour	El Súper Tour	Nominated
2017	Himself	Mejor artista en Instagram	Nominated
2019	Himself	Best Social Artist	Nominated
2019	Himself	Best Scroll Stopper	Nominated
2019	Himself	Street Style	Nominated
2020	Himself & Cydney Moreau	Together They Fire Up My Feed	Nominated
2020	"Whine Up" (with Anuel AA)	This Choreo Is On Fire	Nominated
2020	"Color Esperanza (2020)" (with Various Artist)	The Quarentune	Nominated
2021	"Porfa (Remix)" (with Feid, Maluma, J Balvin, Sech & Justin Quiles)	La Mezcla Perfecta (Song with the Best Collaboration)	Nominated
2022	"Fan de Tus Fotos" (with Romeo Santos)	The Perfect Mix	Nominated
2022	"Poblado (Remix)" (with Karol G, J Balvin, Crissin, Totoy El Frío & Natan y Shander)	Viral Track of the Year	Nominated
2023	"Como El Viento" (with Luis R. Conriquez)	Best Regional Mexican Fusion	Nominated
2023	"Si Te Preguntan..." (with Prince Royce & Jay Wheeler)	Best Tropical Mix	Nominated
2024	"Celular" (with Maluma & The Chainsmokers)	OMG Collaboration	Nominated
2024	"Celular" (with Maluma & The Chainsmokers)	Favorite Dance Track	Nominated
2025	"Ohnana" (with Kapo, Maluma, Ryan Castro & Farruko)	Tropical Mix	Nominated

== Premio Lo Nuestro ==
Year	Work/Nomination	Award	Result
2016	Himself	Urban Artist of the Year	Won
2016	"El perdón" (with Enrique Iglesias)	Collaboration of the Year	Won
2016	"El perdón" (with Enrique Iglesias)	Urban Song of the Year	Won
2016	"Travesuras"	Urban Song of the Year	Nominated
2016	"Greatest Hits, Vol. 1"	Urban Album of the Year	Nominated
2017	Himself	Urban Artist of the Year	Nominated
2017	"Como lo hacía yo" (with Ken-Y)	Collaboration of the Year	Nominated
2017	"Como lo hacía yo" (with Ken-Y)	Urban Collaboration of the Year	Nominated
2017	"Hasta el Amanecer"	Single of the Year	Nominated
2017	"Hasta el Amanecer"	Urban Song of the Year	Won
2017	"Ya Me Enteré" (with Reik)	Pop/Rock Song of the Year	Nominated
2019	Himself	Male Urban Artist of the Year	Nominated
2019	"X" (with J Balvin)	Song of the Year	Nominated
2019	"X" (with J Balvin)	Single of the Year	Nominated
2019	"X" (with J Balvin)	Collaboration of the Year	Nominated
2019	"X" (with J Balvin)	Urban Song of the Year	Nominated
2019	"X" (with J Balvin)	Urban Collaboration of the Year	Nominated
2019	"Mi Cama (Remix)" (with Karol G & J Balvin)	Video of the Year	Won
2019	"Te Boté (Remix)" (with Bad Bunny, Ozuna, Nio Garcia & Casper Magico)	Remix of the Year	Won
2020	Himself	Urban Artist of the Year	Nominated
2020	"Otro Trago (Remix)" (with Sech, Ozuna, Darell & Anuel AA)	Remix of the Year	Nominated
2020	"Te Robaré" (with Ozuna)	Urban Song of the Year	Nominated
2020	"Te Robaré" (with Ozuna)	Urban Collaboration of the Year	Nominated
2020	"Date la vuelta" (with Luis Fonsi & Sebastián Yatra)	Pop/Rock Song of the Year	Nominated
2021	"Porfa (Remix)" (with Feid, Maluma, J Balvin, Sech & Justin Quiles)	Remix of the Year	Nominated
2021	"Yo No Se (Remix)" (with Maxi Gomez & Reik)	Remix of the Year	Nominated
2021	"Muévelo" (with Daddy Yankee)	Urban Song of the Year	Nominated
2021	"Muévelo" (with Daddy Yankee)	Urban Collaboration of the Year	Nominated
2022	"Fan de Tus Fotos" (with Romeo Santos)	Pop Collaboration of the Year	Nominated
2023	Himself	Male Urban Artist of the Year	Nominated
2023	"Ojos Rojos"	Urban Song of the Year	Nominated
2024	"Como el Viento" (with Luis R Conríquez)	The Perfect Mix of the Year	Nominated
2024	"Celular" (with Maluma & The Chainsmokers)	Urban Dance/Pop Song of the Year	Nominated
2025	"Calor" (with Beéle)	Pop-Urban Collaboration Of The Year	Nominated

== Premios Tu Mundo ==
Year	Work/Nomination	Award	Result
2015	Himself	Favorite Urban Artist	Nominated
2015	"El perdón" (with Enrique Iglesias)	Party-Starting Song	Won
2016	Himself	Favorite Urban Artist	Nominated
2016	"Hasta el Amanecer"	Party-Starting Song	Nominated
2017	Himself	Favorite Urban Artist	Nominated

== Telemundo's Tu Musica Urban Awards ==
Year	Work/Nomination	Award	Result
2019	Himself	Male Urban Artist	Nominated
2019	Himself	Artist of the Year	Nominated
2019	Himself	Humanitarian Award of the Year	Nominated
2019	"Te Boté (Remix)" (with Bad Bunny, Ozuna, Nio Garcia & Casper Magico)	Remix of the Year	Won
2019	"X" (with J Balvin)	Collaboration of the Year	Nominated
2019	"X" (with J Balvin)	Video of the Year	Nominated
2019	"Te Boté (Remix)" (with Bad Bunny, Ozuna, Nio Garcia & Casper Magico)	Video of the Year	Nominated
2019	"X" (with J Balvin)	Song of the Year	Nominated
2020	Himself	Artist of the Year	Nominated
2020	Himself	Top Male Artist	Nominated
2020	Himself	Dedication Award	Won
2020	"Otro Trago (Remix)" (with Sech, Ozuna, Darell & Anuel AA)	Remix of the Year	Nominated
2020	"Que Le Dé" (with Rauw Alejandro)	New Generation Song of the Year	Nominated
2020	"Date la vuelta" (with Luis Fonsi & Sebastián Yatra)	Urban/Pop Collaboration of the Year	Nominated
2020	"Verte Ir" (with Anuel AA, Brytiago & Darell)	Collaboration of the Year	Nominated
2020	"Atrévete" (with Sech)	Collaboration of the Year	Nominated
2020	Íntimo	Male Album of the Year	Nominated
2022	Himself	Top Male Artist	Nominated
2022	"Poblado (Remix)" (with Karol G, J Balvin, Crissin, Totoy El Frío & Natan y Shander)	Remix of the Year	Won
2023	"Si Te Preguntan..." (with Prince Royce & Jay Wheeler)	Tropical Urban Song of the Year	Won
