= List of Billboard Tropical Airplay number ones of 2023 =

The Billboard Tropical Airplay chart is a subchart of the Latin Airplay that ranks the best-performing tropical songs played on Latin radio stations in the United States.

== Chart history ==
Issue date	Song	Artist	Ref.
January 7	"Monotonía"	Shakira and Ozuna	
January 14	"Monotonía"	Shakira and Ozuna	
January 21	"Monotonía"	Shakira and Ozuna	
January 28	"Monotonía"	Shakira and Ozuna	
February 4	"El Pañuelo"	Romeo Santos and Rosalía	
February 11	"La Bachata"	Manuel Turizo	
February 18	"El Pañuelo"	Romeo Santos and Rosalía	
February 25	"El Pañuelo"	Romeo Santos and Rosalía	
March 4	"El Pañuelo"	Romeo Santos and Rosalía	
March 11	"La Bachata"	Manuel Turizo	
March 18	"La Bachata"	Manuel Turizo	
March 25	"La Bachata"	Manuel Turizo	
April 1	"La Bachata"	Manuel Turizo	
April 8	"El Merengue"	Marshmello and Manuel Turizo	
April 15	"El Merengue"	Marshmello and Manuel Turizo	
April 22	"El Merengue"	Marshmello and Manuel Turizo	
April 29	"El Merengue"	Marshmello and Manuel Turizo	
May 6	"El Merengue"	Marshmello and Manuel Turizo	
May 13	"El Merengue"	Marshmello and Manuel Turizo	
May 20	"El Merengue"	Marshmello and Manuel Turizo	
May 27	"El Merengue"	Marshmello and Manuel Turizo	
June 3	"El Merengue"	Marshmello and Manuel Turizo	
June 10	"El Merengue"	Marshmello and Manuel Turizo	
June 17	"El Merengue"	Marshmello and Manuel Turizo	
June 24	"El Merengue"	Marshmello and Manuel Turizo	
July 1	"El Merengue"	Marshmello and Manuel Turizo	
July 8	"Me EnRD"	Prince Royce	
July 15	"Me EnRD"	Prince Royce	
July 22	"Me EnRD"	Prince Royce	
July 29	"Me EnRD"	Prince Royce	
August 5	"Bailando Bachata"	Chayanne	
August 12	"Bailando Bachata"	Chayanne	
August 19	"Bailando Bachata"	Chayanne	
August 26	"Bailando Bachata"	Chayanne	
September 2	"Bailando Bachata"	Chayanne	
September 9	"Bailando Bachata"	Chayanne	
September 16	"Bailando Bachata"	Chayanne	
September 23	"Bailando Bachata"	Chayanne	
September 30	"Bailando Bachata"	Chayanne	
October 7	"Bailando Bachata"	Chayanne	
October 14	"Bailando Bachata"	Chayanne	
October 21	"Bandido"	Luis Figueroa	
October 28	"Bandido"	Luis Figueroa	
November 4	"Bailando Bachata"	Chayanne	
November 11	"Bailando Bachata"	Chayanne	
November 18	"Bailando Bachata"	Chayanne	
November 25	"Mambo 23"	Juan Luis Guerra 440	
December 2	"Bailando Bachata"	Chayanne	
December 9	"Asi Es La Vida"	Enrique Iglesias and Maria Becerra	
December 16	"Asi Es La Vida"	Enrique Iglesias and Maria Becerra	
December 23	"Asi Es La Vida"	Enrique Iglesias and Maria Becerra	
December 30	"Asi Es La Vida"	Enrique Iglesias and Maria Becerra	
