= Anestesiada =

Single by Prince Royce featuring Luis Miguel del Amargue

from the album Llamada Perdida
- Language: Spanish
- English title: "Anesthetized"
- Released: March 31, 2024
- Genre: Bachata
- Length: 3:49
- Label: Sony Latin; Smiling Prince Music Inc
- Songwriters: Geoffrey Royce Rojas; D'Lesley Lora; Daniel Santacruz; Edgar Barrera; Edwin Velazquez; Yonathan "Mickey" Then; Luis Miguel Gómez Castaño
- Producers: Geoffrey Royce Rojas; D'Lesly "Dice" Lora; Walter Kolm; Gaby Herrera; Shanelli Rojas

Prince Royce singles chronology
"Calumnia" (2023)	"Anestesiada" (2024)	"El Reemplazo" (2024)

Luis Miguel del Amargue singles chronology
"Un Milimetro de Ti" (2023)	"Anestesiada" (2024)

Music video
- "Anestesiada" on YouTube

"Anestesiada" (English: "Anesthetized") is a song by Dominican-American singer Prince Royce featuring Dominican singer Luis Miguel del Amargue. It was originally released on February 16, 2024, through Sony Music Latin and Smiling Prince Music, Inc., as the tenth track from Royce's seventh studio album, Llamada Perdida (2024). The music video was released on March 31, 2024, thus becoming the album's ninth single. The music video featured the skit "Los Lambones", which is from the ninth track of the album, as the intro to the video.

== Charts ==
Chart (2024)	Peak position
Dominican Republic Bachata (Monitor Latino)	15
