= Otra Vez =

Otra Vez ("Again") may refer to:

- "Otra Vez" (Prince Royce song), 2022
- Otra Vez, an album by Carlos Mata, 1986
- Otra Vez, an album by MDO (band), 2005
- Otra Vez, an album by Miami Sound Machine, 1981
- Otra Vez, an album by Pandora (musical group), 1986
- Otra Vez, an album by Sandy & Papo, 1997
- Otra Vez, an album by Vicente Fernández, 2011
- ¡¿Otra Vez?!, an album by Luzbel, 1989
- "Otra Vez", a song by Miranda! from the album Sin Restricciones, 2004
- "Otra Vez", a song by Natalia Lafourcade from the album Natalia Lafourcade, 2002
- "Otra Vez", a song by Víctor García (Mexican singer), 2003
- "Otra Vez", a song by Zion & Lennox from the album Motivan2, 2016
