= Morfina =

Single by Prince Royce featuring Paloma Mami

from the album Llamada Perdida
- Language: Spanish
- English title: "Morphine"
- Released: February 15, 2024
- Genre: Bachata; pop
- Length: 3:49
- Label: Sony Latin; Smiling Prince Music Inc
- Songwriters: Geoffrey Royce Rojas; D'Lesley Lora; Paloma Rocío Castillo Astorga; Eddie Pérez; Gilberto Yatzel Figueroa; Edwin Velazquez; Juan Manuel Frías; Katriana Huguet; Steven Cruz
- Producers: Geoffrey Royce Rojas; D'Lesly "Dice" Lora; Edwin Velazquez; Walter Kolm; Gaby Herrera; Shanelli Rojas

Prince Royce singles chronology
"Cosas de la Peda" (2024)	"Morfina" (2024)	"Calumnia" (2024)

Paloma Mami singles chronology
"Dosis" (2024)	"Morfina" (2024)	"Loji" (2024)

Music video
- "Morfina" on YouTube

"Morfina" (transl. "Morphine") is a song by Dominican-American singer Prince Royce featuring Chilean-American singer-songwriter Paloma Mami. The music video was released on February 15, 2024, through Sony Music Latin and Smiling Prince Music, Inc., as the eighth single for Royce's seventh studio album, Llamada Perdida, which was released the following day. The music video shows Royce and Mami at a party and featured animation made with artificial intelligence.

== Charts ==
Chart (2024)	Peak position
Dominican Republic Bachata (Monitor Latino)	16
