= Veterana (song) =

Single by Elvis Martínez and Prince Royce

from the album Mi Muchachita
- Language: Spanish
- English title: "Female Veteran"
- Released: December 2, 2021
- Genre: Bachata
- Length: 3:14
- Label: Joch Entertainment; WK Records; Sony Latin

Prince Royce singles chronology
"Lao' a Lao'" (2021)	"Veterana" (2021)	"After Party" (2022)

Elvis Martínez singles chronology
"Saco E' Sal" (2021)	"Veterana" (2021)	"Pa Que Tu Me Llamas" (2021)

Music video
- "Veterana" on YouTube

"Veterana" is a song by bachata singers Elvis Martínez and Prince Royce. The song was released on December 3, 2021. It serves as the second single for Martinez's tenth studio album Mi Muchachita (2022). The music video premiered on the same day as its audio release. They both performed the song live on the grand finale of Telemundo's reality show, Así Se Baila.

== Music video ==
The music video premiered on the same day as its audio release. It was filmed in Miami, Florida and directed by Chacha Zambrano. In the video, Prince Royce is a mechanic while Elvis Martinez is a bartender. They both are head-over-heels over the “veteran” lady, portrayed by Dominican actress Jenny Blanco.

== Charts ==
=== Weekly charts ===
Chart (2021–22)	Peak position
Dominican Republic Bachata (Monitor Latino)	1
Dominican Republic General (Monitor Latino)	1
US Latin Airplay (Billboard)	49
US Tropical Airplay (Billboard)	7

== Certifications ==
Region	Certification	Certified units/sales
United States (RIAA)	Gold (Latin)	30,000^{‡}
^{‡} Sales+streaming figures based on certification alone.
