= Le Doy 20 Mil =

Single by El Alfa and Prince Royce

from the album Llamada Perdida
- Language: Spanish
- English title: "I give her 20 thousand"
- Released: February 9, 2023
- Genre: Latin urban
- Length: 3:02
- Label: Sony Latin; Smiling Prince Music, Inc.

El Alfa singles chronology
"Rulay & Pica Pollo" (2023)	"Le Doy 20 Mil" (2023)	"Doggy Doggy" (2023)

Prince Royce singles chronology
"Otra Vez" (2022)	"Le Doy 20 Mil" (2023)	"Me EnRD" (2023)

Music video
- "Le Doy 20 Mil" on YouTube

"Le Doy 20 Mil" is a song by Dominican rapper El Alfa and Dominican-American singer Prince Royce. It was released on February 9, 2023. It is the fifth single for Royce's seventh studio album, Llamada Perdida. The music video premiered on the same day as its audio release.

== Charts ==
Chart (2021–22)	Peak position
Dominican Republic General (Monitor Latino)	2
Dominican Republic Urbano (Monitor Latino)	2
US Latin Rhythm Airplay (Billboard)	20
