= List of Billboard Tropical Airplay number ones of 2021 =

The Billboard Tropical Airplay chart is a subchart of the Latin Airplay that ranks the best-performing tropical songs played on Latin radio stations in the United States.

== Chart history ==
Issue date	Song	Artist	Ref
January 2	"De Vuelta Pa' La Vuelta"	Daddy Yankee & Marc Anthony	
January 9	"De Vuelta Pa' La Vuelta"	Daddy Yankee & Marc Anthony	
January 16	"De Vuelta Pa' La Vuelta"	Daddy Yankee & Marc Anthony	
January 23	"De Vuelta Pa' La Vuelta"	Daddy Yankee & Marc Anthony	
January 30	"De Vuelta Pa' La Vuelta"	Daddy Yankee & Marc Anthony	
February 6	"De Vuelta Pa' La Vuelta"	Daddy Yankee & Marc Anthony	
February 13	"De Vuelta Pa' La Vuelta"	Daddy Yankee & Marc Anthony	
February 20	"De Vuelta Pa' La Vuelta"	Daddy Yankee & Marc Anthony	
February 27	"De Vuelta Pa' La Vuelta"	Daddy Yankee & Marc Anthony	
March 6	"Travesuras"	Nio Garcia & Casper Magico	
March 13	"De Vuelta Pa' La Vuelta"	Daddy Yankee & Marc Anthony	
March 20	"Un Amor Eterno"	Marc Anthony	
March 27	"De Vuelta Pa' La Vuelta"	Daddy Yankee & Marc Anthony	
April 3	"De Vuelta Pa' La Vuelta"	Daddy Yankee & Marc Anthony	
April 10	"De Vuelta Pa' La Vuelta"	Daddy Yankee & Marc Anthony	
April 17	"De Vuelta Pa' La Vuelta"	Daddy Yankee & Marc Anthony	
April 24	"De Vuelta Pa' La Vuelta"	Daddy Yankee & Marc Anthony	
May 1	"De Vuelta Pa' La Vuelta"	Daddy Yankee & Marc Anthony	
May 8	"De Vuelta Pa' La Vuelta"	Daddy Yankee & Marc Anthony	
May 15	"De Vuelta Pa' La Vuelta"	Daddy Yankee & Marc Anthony	
May 22	"De Vuelta Pa' La Vuelta"	Daddy Yankee & Marc Anthony	
May 29	"Victimas Las Dos"	Víctor Manuelle & La India	
June 5	"Si Supieras"	Prince Royce	
June 12	"Si Supieras"	Prince Royce	
June 19	"Si Supieras"	Prince Royce	
June 26	"Si Supieras"	Prince Royce	
July 3	"Tu Fan"	Luis Vázquez	
July 10	"De Vuelta Pa' La Vuelta"	Daddy Yankee & Marc Anthony	
July 17	"Si Supieras"	Prince Royce	
July 24	"Si Supieras"	Prince Royce	
July 31	"Hasta El Sol de Hoy"	Luis Figueroa	
August 7	"De Vuelta Pa' La Vuelta"	Daddy Yankee & Marc Anthony	
August 14	"De Vuelta Pa' La Vuelta"	Daddy Yankee & Marc Anthony	
August 21	"KESI"	Camilo	
August 28	"Lao' A Lao'"	Prince Royce	
September 4	"Volví"	Aventura and Bad Bunny	
September 11	"Volví"	Aventura and Bad Bunny	
September 18	"Volví"	Aventura and Bad Bunny	
September 25	"La Funka"	Ozuna	
October 2	"Volví"	Aventura and Bad Bunny	
October 9	"Volví"	Aventura and Bad Bunny	
October 16	"Volví"	Aventura and Bad Bunny	
October 23	"Volví"	Aventura and Bad Bunny	
October 30	"Lao' a Lao'"	Prince Royce	
November 6	"Lao' a Lao'"	Prince Royce	
November 13	"Volví"	Aventura and Bad Bunny	
November 20	"Volví"	Aventura and Bad Bunny	
November 27	"Volví"	Aventura and Bad Bunny	
December 4	"Volví"	Aventura and Bad Bunny	
December 11	"Volví"	Aventura and Bad Bunny	
December 18	"Volví"	Aventura and Bad Bunny	
December 25	"Se Menea"	Don Omar and Nio Garcia	
