= Lao' a Lao' =

Single by Prince Royce

from the album Llamada Perdida
- Language: Spanish
- English title: "Side to Side"
- Released: August 12, 2021; December 17, 2021 (Bachata 2.0 Version)
- Genre: Bachata
- Length: 3:04; 2:57 (Bachata 2.0)
- Label: Sony Latin
- Songwriter: Geoffrey Rojas

Prince Royce singles chronology
| "Doctor" (2021) | "Lao' a Lao'" (2021) | "Veterana" (2021) |

Music video
- "Lao' a Lao'" on YouTube

"Lao' a Lao'" (transl. "Side to Side") is a song by American singer Prince Royce. The song was released on August 12, 2021. It is the first single for his seventh studio album, Llamada Perdida. The music video premiered on the same day as its audio release. An alternate version which is called in the title as Bachata 2.0 was released on December 17, 2021.

== Background ==
Royce had to cancel his Alter Ego Tour due to the COVID-19 pandemic. During that time, he spent the first several month doing different hobbies until he eventually would start making songs again. Since they weren't able to go back to a studio, they had to do it via Zoom calls. The inspiration for this song was based on the situation with the pandemic since no one was able to leave their house to due certain activities like going to in-person events.

== Charts ==
=== Weekly charts ===
| Chart (2021) | Peak position |
|---|---|
| Dominican Republic Bachata (Monitor Latino) | 1 |
| Dominican Republic General (Monitor Latino) | 1 |
| Mexico Airplay (Billboard) | 48 |
| Mexico Español Airplay (Billboard) | 18 |
| US Hot Latin Songs (Billboard) | 23 |
| US Latin Airplay (Billboard) | 1 |
| US Tropical Airplay (Billboard) | 1 |

=== Year-end charts ===
| Chart (2021) | Peak position |
|---|---|
| US Tropical Airplay (Billboard) | 7 |

== Certifications ==
| Region | Certification | Certified units/sales |
|---|---|---|
| United States (RIAA) | Platinum (Latin) | 60,000^{‡} |
^{‡} Sales+streaming figures based on certification alone.

== See also ==
- List of Billboard Hot Latin Songs and Latin Airplay number ones of 2021
- List of Billboard Tropical Airplay number ones of 2021
