= Classic Tour (Prince Royce) =

2022 concert tour by Prince Royce

- Tour by Prince Royce
- Start date: September 16, 2022
- End date: November 19, 2022
- Legs: 1
- No. of shows: 17

Prince Royce concert chronology
- Alter Ego Tour; Classic Tour; Llamada Perdida Tour

Classic Tour was a concert tour by American singer Prince Royce. The tour was based on Royce's greatest hit songs. It started on September 16, 2022, in Miami, Florida, and ended on November 19, 2022, in Guayaquil, Ecuador. It included two sold-out shows at the United Palace in New York City on September 30, and October 1, 2022.

== Tour dates ==
List of concerts, showing date, city, country, venue.
Date	City	Country	Venue
North America
September 16, 2022	Miami	United States	FTX Arena
September 17, 2022	Orlando	United States	Hard Rock Live Orlando
September 18, 2022	Atlanta	United States	The Eastern
September 22, 2022	Dallas	United States	Trust CU Theatre at Grand Prairie
September 23, 2022	Houston	United States	Smart Financial Centre at Sugar Land
September 25, 2022	Chicago	United States	Rosemont Theatre
September 30, 2022	New York City	United States	United Palace
October 1, 2022	New York City	United States	United Palace
October 2, 2022	Washington D.C.	United States	DAR Constitution Hall
October 5, 2022	Seattle	United States	WAMU Theater
October 7, 2022	Los Angeles	United States	Microsoft Theater
October 8, 2022	San Jose	United States	San Jose Center for the Performing Arts
October 9, 2022	Santa Barbara	United States	Arlington Theater
October 13, 2022	Winterhaven	United States	Quechan Casino Resort
October 15, 2022	Indio	United States	Fantasy Springs Casino & Resort
South America
November 17, 2022	Quito	Ecuador	Agora Casa de la Cultura
November 19, 2022	Guayaquil	Ecuador	Coliseo Voltaire Paladines Polo
