= Los Premios 40 Principales América for Best Dominican Act =

Spanish music award

Premios 40 Principales for Best Dominican Act
- Awarded for: Best in Latin American and international music
- Country: Latin America
- Presented by: Los 40 Principales
- First award: 2014

The Premio 40 Principales América for Best Dominican Act is an honor presented annually since 2014 as part of Los Premios 40 Principales América.

== Winners and nominees ==
Year	Winner	Nominees
2014	Aura	Vicente García; Romeo Santos; Prince Royce; Ilegales
