= 2019 Heat Latin Music Awards =

- Date: May 13, 2019
- Venue: Hard Rock Hotel and Casino, Punta Cana, Dominican Republic
- Country: United States; Latin America
- Hosted by: Anaís Castro; Mariela Encarnación

Highlights
- Most awards: Karol G (2)
- Most nominations: J Balvin (5)
- Website: premiosheat.com

Television/radio coverage
- Network: HTV

The 2019 Heat Latin Music Awards was held on May 13, 2019 at Hard Rock Hotel and Casino, Punta Cana, and broadcast live through HTV. The ceremony was hosted by Anaís Castro and Mariela Encarnación. The awards celebrated the year's biggest Latin music acts. J Balvin led the nominations with five, followed by Ozuna and Sebastián Yatra, with four each.

== Performers ==
- Ala Jaza
- Américo
- Anuel AA
- Cazzu
- Daniela Darcourt
- Eddie Herrera
- Farina
- Farruko
- Gabriel
- Greeicy
- Ivy Queen
- J Balvin
- Juanes
- Karol G
- Mike Bahia
- Olga Tañón
- Roberto Antonio
- Thomaz
- Zion & Lennox

== Presenters ==
- AJ Callejero
- Alofoke
- Jowell & Randy
- Juan Magán
- Lary Over
- Lo Blanquito
- Lunay
- Manny Cruz
- Manuel Medrano
- Marielle Hazlo
- Mark B
- Master Chris
- Mirella Cesa
- Mozart La Para
- Noriel
- Sebastián Yatra
- Shadow Blow

== Nominees ==
Best Male Artist	Best Female Artist
J Balvin; Carlos Vives; Luis Fonsi; Maluma; Nicky Jam; Ozuna; Romeo Santos; Sebastián Yatra	Karol G; Becky G; Farina; Greeicy; Anitta; Natti Natasha
Best Group	Best Rock Artist
Zion & Lennox; CNCO; Mau y Ricky; Morat; Piso 21; Reik; ChocQuibTown	Juanes; Bomba Estéreo; Café Tacvba; Aterciopelados; Los Cafres; Los Pericos
Best Pop Artist	Best Urban Artist
Sebastián Yatra; Jencarlos Canela; Manuel Medrano; Pablo Alborán; Paty Cantú; Sanluis; Andrés Cepeda; Sin Bandera	J Balvin; Daddy Yankee; Farruko; Bad Bunny; Karol G; Maluma; Nicky Jam; Ozuna
Best Tropical Artist	Best Southern Artist
Victor Manuelle; Eddy Herrera; Gabriel; Jerry Rivera; Roberto Antonio; Silvestre Dangond; Carlos Vives	Américo; Agapornis; Daniela Darcourt; Lali; Los Caligaris; Mon Laferte; Rombai
Best Northern Artist	Best Andean Artist
Juan Magán; Gabriel; Manni Cruz; Marielle; Melendi; Mozart La Para; Vicente García	Mike Bahía; Chyno Miranda; Alkilados; Mirella Cesa; Pipe Bueno; Tomas the Latin Boy; Wolfine
Best Collaboration	Best Video
Greeicy (featuring Mike Bahía) — "Amantes"; Farruko, Nicki Minaj and Bad Bunny (featuring 21 Savage and Rvssian — "Krippy Kush (Remix)"; Bad Bunny, J Balvin and Prince Royce (featuring Mambo Kingz andDJ Luian) — "Sensualidad"; J Balvin, Anitta and Jeon — "Machika"; Maluma (featuring Marc Anthony) — "Felices Los 4 (Salsa Version)"; Natti Natasha and Ozuna — "Criminal"; Reik (featuring Ozuna and Wisin) — "Me niego"	Karol G — "Pineapple"; Gabriel — "A Tan Solo Una Hora"; J Balvin, Anitta and Jeon — "Machika"; Juan Magán, Belinda, Manuel Turizo, Snova and B-Case — "Déjate Llevar"; Juanes — "Pa Dentro"; Daddy Yankee — "Dura"; Luis Fonsi and Demi Lovato — "Échame la Culpa"; Sebastián Yatra (featuring Luis Figueroa and Lary Over) — "Por Perro"
Best New Artist
Anuel AA; Daniela Darcourt; Greeicy; Manuel Turizo; Mark B; Paulo Londra; Ventino

== Multiple nominations and awards ==
The following received multiple nominations:

Five:

- J Balvin

Four:

- Ozuna
- Sebastián Yatra

Three:

- Anitta
- Bad Bunny
- Carlos Vives
- Gabriel
- Greeicy
- Karol G
- Maluma

Two:

- Daddy Yankee
- Daniela Darcourt
- Farruko
- Jeon
- Juan Magán
- Juanes
- Luis Fonsi
- Manuel Turizo
- Mike Bahia
- Natti Natasha
- Nicky Jam
- Reik
