= 2017 Latin Billboard Music Awards =

Annual American music awards ceremony

24th Billboard Latin Music Awards
- Date: April 27, 2017
- Site: Watsco Center; Coral Gables, Florida, U.S.

Television coverage
- Network: Telemundo

The 24th annual Billboard Latin Music Awards which honor the most popular albums, songs, and performers in Latin music took place in Miami.

== Artist of the Year ==
- J Balvin
- Juan Gabriel
- Los Plebes del Rancho de Ariel Camacho
- Nicky Jam

== Artist of the Year, New ==
- CNCO
- Crecer Germán
- Ozuna
- Ulíces Chaidez y Sus Plebes

== Tour of the Year ==
- Julión Álvarez y Su Norteño Banda
- Maná
- Marc Anthony
- Marco Antonio Solís

== Social Artist of the Year ==
- Enrique Iglesias
- Jennifer Lopez
- Maluma
- Shakira

== Crossover Artist of the Year ==
- Calvin Harris
- Drake
- Justin Bieber
- Rihanna

== Hot Latin Song of the Year ==
- Carlos Vives feat. Shakira – La Bicicleta
- Daddy Yankee – Shaky Shaky
- Enrique Iglesias feat. Wisin – Duele El Corazón
- Nicky Jam – Hasta El Amanecer

== Hot Latin Song of the Year, Vocal Event ==
- Carlos Vives feat. Shakira – La Bicicleta
- Enrique Iglesias feat. Wisin – Duele El Corazón
- Farruko feat. Ky-Mani Marley – Chillax
- Shakira feat. Maluma – "Chantaje"

== Hot Latin Songs Artist of the Year, Male ==
- Daddy Yankee
- J Balvin
- Maluma
- Nicky Jam

== Hot Latin Songs Artist of the Year, Female ==
- Becky G
- Jennifer Lopez
- Shakira
- Thalía

== Hot Latin Songs Artist of the Year, Duo or Group ==
- Banda Sinaloense MS De Sergio Lizárraga
- La Arrolladora Banda el Limón de René Camacho
- Los Plebes del Rancho de Ariel Camacho
- Zion & Lennox

== Hot Latin Songs Label of the Year ==
- DEL
- Sony Music Latin
- Universal Music Latin Entertainment
- Warner Latina

== Hot Latin Songs Imprint of the Year ==
- Capitol Latin
- DEL
- Fonovisa
- Sony Music Latin

== Airplay Song of the Year ==
- Carlos Vives feat. Shakira – La Bicicleta
- Enrique Iglesias feat. Wisin – Duele el Corazón
- Nicky Jam – Hasta El Amanecer
- Prince Royce – La Carretera

== Airplay Label of the Year ==
- Lizos
- Sony Music Latin
- Universal Music Latin Entertainment
- Warner Latina

== Airplay Imprint of the Year ==
- Disa
- Fonovisa
- Sony Music Latin
- Warner Latina

== Digital Song of the Year ==
- Carlos Vives feat. Shakira – La Bicicleta
- Enrique Iglesias feat. Wisin – Duele el Corazón
- Nicky Jam – Hasta El Amanecer
- Pitbull feat. Sensato, Lil Jon & Osmani Garcia – El Taxi

== Streaming Song of the Year ==
- Ariel Camacho y Los Plebes del Rancho – Te Metiste
- Daddy Yankee – Shaky Shaky
- Enrique Iglesias feat. Wisin – Duele el Corazón
- Nicky Jam – Hasta El Amanecer

== Top Latin Album of the Year ==
- Banda Sinaloense MS de Sergio Lizárraga – Que Bendición
- Juan Gabriel – Los Dúo 2
- Juan Gabriel – Vestido de Etiqueta: Por Eduardo Magallanes
- Los Plebes del Rancho de Ariel Camacho – Recuerden Mi Estilo

== Latin Compilation Album of the Year ==
- Varios/Various – 20 Bandazos de Oro: Puros Éxitos
- Varios/Various – De Puerto Rico Para El Mundo
- Varios/Various – Las Bandas Románticas de América 2016
- Varios/Various – Latin Hits 2016: Club Edition

== Top Latin Albums Artist of the Year, Male ==
- J Balvin
- Joan Sebastian
- Juan Gabriel
- Marco Antonio Solís

== Top Latin Albums Artist of the Year, Female ==
- Ana Gabriel
- Jenni Rivera
- Selena
- Thalía

== Top Latin Albums Artist of the Year, Duo or Group ==
- Banda Sinaloense MS De Sergio Lizárraga
- Calibre 50
- Julión Álvarez y Su Norteño Banda
- Los Plebes del Rancho de Ariel Camacho

== Top Latin Albums Label of the Year ==
- DEL
- Lizos
- Sony Music Latin
- Universal Music Latin Entertainment

== Top Latin Albums Imprint of the Year ==
- DEL
- Disa
- Fonovisa
- Sony Music Latin

== Latin Pop Song of the Year ==
- Carlos Vives feat. Shakira – La Bicicleta
- Chino & Nacho feat. Daddy Yankee – Andas En Mi Cabeza
- Enrique Iglesias feat. Wisin – Duele el Corazón
- Reik feat. Nicky Jam – "Ya Me Enteré"

== Latin Pop Songs Artist of the Year, Solo ==
- Carlos Vives
- Enrique Iglesias
- Ricky Martin
- Shakira

== Latin Pop Songs Artist of the Year, Duo or Group ==
- Chino & Nacho
- CNCO
- Jesse & Joy
- Sin Bandera

== Latin Pop Airplay Label of the Year ==
- Mr. 305
- Sony Music Latin
- Universal Music Latin Entertainment
- Warner Latina

== Latin Pop Airplay Imprint of the Year ==
- Capitol Latin
- Sony Music Latin
- Universal Music Latino
- Warner Latina

== Latin Pop Album of the Year ==
- CNCO – Primera Cita
- Juan Gabriel – Los Dúo 2
- Juan Gabriel – Vestido Por Etiqueta Por Eduardo Magallanes
- Selena – Lo Mejor de...

== Latin Pop Albums Artist of the Year, Solo ==
- Ana Gabriel
- Juan Gabriel
- Marco Antonio Solís
- Selena

== Latin Pop Albums Artist of the Year, Duo or Group ==
- CNCO
- Il Divo
- Jesse & Joy
- Reik

== Latin Pop Albums Label of the Year ==
- Columbia
- Sony Music Latin
- Universal Music Latin Entertainment
- Warner Latina

== Latin Pop Albums Imprint of the Year ==
- Capitol Latin
- Fonovisa
- Sony Music Latin
- Universal Music Latino

== Tropical Song of the Year ==
- Deorro feat. Pitbull & Elvis Crespo – Bailar
- Gente de Zona feat. Marc Anthony – Traidora
- Prince Royce – La Carretera
- Victor Manuelle feat. Yandel – Imaginar

== Tropical Songs Artist of the Year, Solo ==
- Elvis Crespo
- Marc Anthony
- Prince Royce
- Romeo Santos

== Tropical Songs Artist of the Year, Duo or Group ==
- 24 Horas
- Chiquito Team Band
- Gente de Zona
- Grupo Niche

== Tropical Songs Airplay Label of the Year ==
- LP
- ParkEast
- Sony Music Latin
- Universal Music Latin Entertainment

== Tropical Songs Airplay Imprint of the Year ==
- Capitol Latin
- Sony Music Latin
- Universal Music Latino
- Warner Latina

== Tropical Album of the Year ==
- Aventura – Todavía Me Amas: Lo Mejor de Aventura
- El Gran Combo de Puerto Rico – Alunizando
- Gente de Zona, Visualízate
- La Tribu de Abrante – Otro Formato de Música

== Tropical Albums Artist of the Year, Solo ==
- Diego "El Cigala"
- Manny Manuel
- Marc Anthony
- Victor Manuelle

== Tropical Albums Artist of the Year, Duo or Group ==
- Aventura
- El Gran Combo de Puerto Rico
- Gente de Zona
- La Tribu de Abrante

== Sello Discográfico del Año, "Tropical Albums" Tropical Albums Label of the Year ==
- EGC
- Planet Records
- Sony Music Latin
- Universal Music Latin Entertainment

== Tropical Albums Imprint of the Year ==
- Magnus
- Planet Records
- Premium Latin
- Sony Music Latin

== Regional Mexican Song of the Year ==
- Banda Sinaloense MS de Sergio Lizárraga – Me Vas A Extrañar
- Banda Sinaloense MS de Sergio Lizárraga – Solo Con Verte
- La Arrolladora Banda el Limón de René Camacho – Me Va A Pesar
- Regulo Caro – Cicatriiices

== Regional Mexican Songs Artist of the Year, Solo ==
- Adriel Favela
- Gerardo Ortiz
- Regulo Caro
- Remmy Valenzuela

== Regional Mexican Songs Artist of the Year, Duo or Group ==
- Banda Sinaloense MS de Sergio Lizárraga
- Calibre 50
- La Arrolladora Banda El Limón de René Camacho
- Los Plebes del Rancho de Ariel Camacho

== Regional Mexican Airplay Label of the Year ==
- DEL
- Lizos
- Sony Music Latin
- Universal Music Latin Entertainment

== Regional Mexican Airplay Imprint of the Year ==
- DEL
- Disa
- Fonovisa
- Lizos

== Regional Mexican Album of the Year ==
- Banda Sinaloense MS de Sergio Lizárraga – Que Bendición
- Julión Álvarez y Su Norteño Banda – Lecciones Para El Corazón
- Julión Álvarez y Su Norteño Banda – Mis Ídolos, Hoy Mis Amigos!!!
- Los Plebes del Rancho de Ariel Camacho – Recuerden Mi Estilo

== Regional Mexican Albums Artist of the Year, Solo ==
- Espinoza Paz
- Jenni Rivera
- Joan Sebastian
- Vicente Fernández

== Regional Mexican Albums Artist of the Year, Duo or Group ==
- Banda Sinaloense MS de Sergio Lizárraga
- Calibre 50
- Julión Álvarez y Su Norteño Banda
- Los Plebes del Rancho de Ariel Camacho

== Regional Mexican Albums Label of the Year ==
- DEL
- Lizos
- Sony Music Latin
- Universal Music Latin Entertainment

== Regional Mexican Albums Imprint of the Year ==
- DEL
- Disa
- Fonovisa
- Lizos

== Latin Rhythm Song of the Year ==
- Farruko Feat. Ky-Mani Marley – Chillax
- J Balvin – Bobo
- Maluma feat. Yandel – El Perdedor
- Nicky Jam – Hasta El Amanecer

== Latin Rhythm Songs Artist of the Year, Solo ==
- J Balvin
- Maluma
- Nicky Jam
- Yandel

== Latin Rhythm Songs Artist of the Year, Duo or Group ==
- Alexis & Fido
- Plan B
- Play-N-Skillz
- Zion & Lennox
- CNCO

== Latin Rhythm Airplay Label of the Year ==
- Mr. 305
- Sony Music Latin
- Universal Music Latin Entertainment
- Warner Latina

== Latin Rhythm Airplay Imprint of the Year ==
- Capitol Latin
- La Industria
- Sony Music Latin
- Warner Latina

== Latin Rhythm Album of the Year ==
- Farruko – Visionary
- J Balvin – Energía
- Maluma – Pretty Boy Dirty Boy
- Yandel – Dangerous

== Latin Rhythm Albums Artist of the Year, Solo ==
- Farruko
- J Balvin
- Maluma
- Pitbull

== Latin Rhythm Albums Artist of the Year, Duo or Group ==
- Cartel de Santa
- Plan B
- Yomil Y El Dany
- Zion & Lennox

== Latin Rhythm Albums Label of the Year ==
- Rich
- Sony Music Latin
- Universal Music Latin Entertainment
- Warner Latina

== Latin Rhythm Albums Imprint of the Year ==
- Capitol Latin
- Pina
- Sony Music Latin
- Universal Music Latino

== Songwriter of the Year ==
- Edén Muñoz
- Horacio Palencia Cisneros
- Luciano Luna Díaz
- Raymond Luis "Daddy Yankee" Ayala Rodríguez
- Ozuna

== Publisher of the Year ==
- DEL World Songs, ASCAP
- Dulce Maria Music, LLC, SESAC
- Sony/ATV Discos Music Publishing LLC, ASCAP
- Sony/ATV Latin Music Publishing, LLC, BMI

== Publishing Corporation of the Year ==
- BMG
- Sony/ATV Music
- Universal Music
- Warner/Chappell Music

== Producer of the Year ==
- Alejandro "Sky" Suárez Ramírez
- Jesus Jaime González Terrazas
- Saga Whiteblack
- Sergio Lizarraga

== Billboard Lifetime achievement award ==
- Ricardo Arjona

== Spirit Of Hope ==
- Luis Fonsi

== Star Award ==
- Jennifer Lopez
