= Otra Vez (Prince Royce song) =

Single by Prince Royce

from the album Llamada Perdida
- Language: Spanish
- English title: "Again"
- Released: December 8, 2022
- Genre: Bachata
- Length: 3:41
- Label: Sony Latin & Smiling Prince Music Inc
- Songwriter: Geoffrey Rojas

Prince Royce singles chronology
"Si Te Preguntan..." (2022)	"Otra Vez" (2022)	"Le Doy 20 Mil" (2023)

Music video
- "Otra Vez" on YouTube

"Otra Vez" is a song by American singer Prince Royce. The song was released on December 8, 2022 through Sony Latin & Smiling Prince Music Inc. It is the fourth single for his seventh studio album, Llamada Perdida. The music video was released on the same day.

== Charts ==
Chart (2022–2023)	Peak position
Dominican Republic Bachata (Monitor Latino)	1
Dominican Republic General (Monitor Latino)	2
US Latin Airplay (Billboard)	26
US Tropical Airplay (Billboard)	6

== Certifications ==
Region	Certification	Certified units/sales
United States (RIAA)	Gold (Latin)	30,000^{‡}
^{‡} Sales+streaming figures based on certification alone.
