= Llamada Perdida =

Studio album by Prince Royce
- Released: February 16, 2024
- Recorded: 2021–2023
- Genres: Bachata; pop; R&B
- Length: 1:16:00
- Language: Spanish
- Labels: Sony Latin; Smiling Prince Music, Inc.
- Producers: Prince Royce; D'lesly "Dice" Lora; Edgar Barrera; Luis Miguel Gómez Castaño

Prince Royce chronology
Alter Ego (2020)	Llamada Perdida (2024)	Eterno (2025)

Singles from Llamada Perdida
- 1. "Lao' a Lao'" Released: August 12, 2021; 2. "Te Espero" Released: March 3, 2022; 3. "Si Te Preguntan..." Released: June 23, 2022; 4. "Otra Vez" Released: December 8, 2022; 5. "Le Doy 20 Mil" Released: February 9, 2023; 6. "Me EnRD" Released: April 20, 2023; 7. "Cosas de la Peda" Released: January 16, 2024; 8. "Morfina" Released: February 15, 2024; 9. "Anestesiada" Released: March 31, 2024

Llamada Perdida (transl. "Missed Call") is the seventh studio album by American singer and songwriter Prince Royce. It was released on February 16, 2024, under Sony Music Latin, and Royce's music company Smiling Prince Music, Inc. The album contains guest appearances by Ala Jaza, María Becerra, A Boogie wit da Hoodie, Luis Miguel del Amargue, Gabito Ballesteros, Paloma Mami, Lenny Tavárez, Nicky Jam, Jay Wheeler, and El Alfa.

Nine singles from Llamada Perdida were released: "Lao' a Lao'", "Te Espero", "Si Te Preguntan...", "Otra Vez", "Le Doy 20 Mil", "Me EnRD", "Cosas de la Peda","Morfina" and "Anestesiada".

== Release and promotion ==
Royce began promoting the album with the release the single "Lao' a Lao'" on August 12, 2021. He then continued to release more singles. On January 16, 2024, he released the single "Cosas de la Peda" with Gabito Ballesteros. On the same day, after almost three years since the albums' first single was release, he announced the name and release date of the album on all his social media pages. The next day, both Royce and Ballesteros performed the song live at Good Morning America as part of the show's concert series.

== Commercial performance ==
Llamada Perdida debuted at number 18 on the Billboard Top Latin Albums chart and at number two on the US Tropical Albums chart, with over 6,000 album-equivalent units.

== Track listing ==
No.	Title	Length
1.	"La Corriente"	3:03
2.	"No Te Vayas"	3:33
3.	"Sufro" (featuring Ala Jaza)	3:00
4.	"Te Espero" (with María Becerra)	4:06
5.	"Llamada Perdida"	3:07
6.	"Champaña"	3:01
7.	"Boogie Chata" (featuring A Boogie wit da Hoodie)	3:41
8.	"Borrador"	3:56
9.	"Los Lambones"	0:42
10.	"Anestesiada" (featuring Luis Miguel del Amargue)	3:49
11.	"Cosas de la Peda" (featuring Gabito Ballesteros)	2:41
12.	"Si Ya No Volveras"	4:43
13.	"Morfina" (featuring Paloma Mami)	3:49
14.	"Como Salimos de Este Lío?" (featuring Lenny Taváres)	3:17
15.	"La Vida Te Hace Fuerte"	3:18
16.	"Si Te Preguntan..." (with Nicky Jam and Jay Wheeler)	3:43
17.	"Matar el Sentimiento"	3:36
18.	"Frío en el Infierno"	2:59
19.	"Un Papel"	3:36
20.	"Me EnRD"	3:05
21.	"Otra Vez"	3:41
22.	"Le Doy 20 Mil" (with El Alfa)	3:02
23.	"Lao' a Lao'"	3:04
Total length:		01:16:00

== Personnel ==
- Composer, Featured Artist, Lyricist - A Boogie Wit Da Hoodie
- Bass - Adam "Pikachu" Gomez
- Bass - Adan Gomez
- Featured Artist - Ala Jaza
- Assistant Engineer, Engineer - Alejandro "Sky" Ramirez
- A&R - Alejandro Reglero
- Arranger, Guitar - Alaxander "Chi Chi" Caba
- Bass - Alfonso Gonzalez
- Violin - Alfredo Olivia
- Composer, Lyricist - Andres Jael Correa Rios
- Congas - Angel Vasquez
- Composer, Lyricist - Ben E. King
- Composer, Lyricist - Betances Alejo Chael Eugenio
- Engineer, Vocal Engineer - Big One
- Producer - Brasa
- Engineer, Producer, Vocal Engineer - Carlos A. Molina
- Engineer - Carlos Alvarez
- Composer, Lyricist - Carlos Galan
- Mastering Engineer, Mixing Engineer, Producer - Chael Produciendo
- Viola - Chauncey Patterson
- Bass - Chris Mercedes
- Bass - Christopher Mercedes
- Guiro - Christopher Sanchez
- Mastering Engineer - Colin Leonard
- Arranger, Co-Producer, Composer, Keyboards, Lyricist, Producer, Vocals - D'Lesly "Dice" Lora
- Composer, Lyricist - Daniel Candia
- Guiro - Daniel Luna
- Composer, Lyricist - Daniel Santacruz
- Electric Guitar - Daniel Uribe
- Composer, Lyricist - David Andres Arrieta Loza
- Composer, Lyricist - Eddie Perez
- Composer, Lyricist, Producer - Edgar Barrera
- Composer, Lyricist - Edgar W. Semper Vargas
- Arranger, Co-Producer, Composer, Engineer, Keyboards, Lyricist, Mixing Engineer, Producer, Vocals, Background Vocals - Edwin Velazquez
- Arranger, Conductor, Orchestra, Strings - Efrain Davilla
- Primary Artist - El Alfa
- A&R - Emiliano Vasquez
- Composer, Lyricist - Emmanuel Herrera "El Alfa" Batista
- Bass, Composer, Lyricist, Producer - Enmanuel Jimenez
- Violin - Erika Venable
- Violin - Evija Ozolins
- Composer, Featured Artist, Lyricist - Gabito Ballesteros
- Executive Producer - Gaby Herrera
- A&R - Gaby Vilar
- Accordion, Arranger, Composer, Lyricist - Genodaviel Peralta
- Co-Producer, Composer, Executive Producer, Lyricist, Producer, Vocals - Geoffrey Royce Rojas
- Composer, Lyricist, Producer - George Noriega
- Composer, Lyricist - Gerald Oscar Jimenez
- Composer, Lyricist, Producer - Gerardo Gemara Plascencia
- Composer, Lyricist - German Duque
- Composer, Lyricist - Giencarlos Rivera
- Composer, Lyricist - Gilberto Yatzel Figueroa Ortiz
- Producer - Gio Fernandez
- Guitar - Gio Williams
- Composer, Lyricist - Giovanny Fernandez
- Composer, Lyricist - Henry Ulloa
- Keyboards - Isiah Parker
- Cello - Jason Calloway
- Arranger, Composer, Guitar, Lyricist, Vocals - Javier Franco
- Primary Artist - Jay Wheeler
- Bongos, Congas, Guiro - Joel Rodriguez
- Keyboards - Johan Beltre
- Composer, Lyricist - Jonathan Rivera
- Composer, Lyricist - Jonathan Rotem
- Composer, Lyricist - Jose Angel Lopez Martinez
- Composer, Lyricist - Juan Diego Medina Velez
- Composer, Lyricist - Juan Ignacio Baez
- Composer, Lyricist - Juan Miguel Frias
- Composer, Lyricist - Juan Miguel Rubiera
- Composer, Lyricist - Julio Tavarez Gonzalez
- Composer, Lyricist - Kat Dahlia
- Composer, Lyricist - Kedin Maysonet
- Composer, Lyricist - Kerry Leiber
- Engineer - Kevin O. Ortiz Bones
- Composer, Lyricist - Kisean Anderson
- Featured Artist - Lenny Tavarez
- Acoustic Guitar - Leonardo Gama
- Composer, Lyricist - Luian Malave
- Mixing Engineer - Luis Barrera, Jr.
- Keyboards - Luis Fernandez
- Featured Artist - Luis Miguel Del Amargue
- Composer, Lyricist, Producer - Luis Miguel Gomez Castano
- Producer - Madmusick
- Saxophone - Manuel Paulino
- Violin - Marina Lenau
- Composer, Lyricist, Primary Artist - Maria Becerra
- A&R - Mayra Del Valle
- Strings - Miami Symphonic Studio Orchestra
- Director - Micheline Medina
- Composer, Lyricist - Miguel Martinez
- Composer, Lyricist - Miguel Munoz
- Producer - Mike Munoz
- Composer, Lyricist - Mike Stoller
- Composer, Lyricist - Nelson Enrique Alvarado Palomino
- Composer, Lyricist - Nicholas Eede
- Composer, Lyricist, Primary Artist - Nicky Jam
- Violin - Orlando Forte
- Composer, Lyricist - Pablo Fuentes
- Trombone, Trumpet - Pablo Molina
- Composer, Lyricist - Paloma Castillo
- Featured Artist - Paloma Mami
- Composer, Lyricist - Pamel Mancebo
- Guitar - Pamel Mancebo Martinez
- Congas - Paulino Familia
- Assistant Engineer - Paulo Uribe
- Primary Artist, Background Vocals - Prince Royce
- A&R - Rafael "Rafa" Arcaute
- Guiro - Raynier Peralta
- Bongos - Raul Bier
- Composer, Lyricist - Roberto Carlos Sierra Casseres
- Composer, Guitar, Lyricist - Robinson Hernandez
- Arranger, Guitar - Rogelito Santos "Eto"
- Composer, Lyricist - Ronald Lopez
- Composer, Lyricist - Salim Asencio
- Co-Producer, Composer, Lyricist, Vocals, Background Vocals - Shanelli Rojas
- Composer, Guitar, Lyricist - Steven Cruz
- Composer, Lyricist - Sylvester Jordan
- Executive Producer - Walter Kolm
- Composer, Lyricist - Wander Manuel Mendez
- Tambour - William Jimenez
- Composer, Lyricist - Xavier Semper
- Viola - Yael Hyken
- Violin - Yahau Zhou
- Composer, Lyricist - Yoel Henriquez
- Composer, Lyricist - Yonathan Then

== Charts ==
Weekly chart performance for Llamada Perdida
Chart (2024)	Peak position
Spanish Albums (Promusicae)	52
US Top Latin Albums (Billboard)	18
US Tropical Albums (Billboard)	2

== Certifications ==
Certifications for Llamada Perdida
Region	Certification	Certified units/sales
United States (RIAA)	2× Platinum (Latin)	120,000^{‡}
^{‡} Sales+streaming figures based on certification alone.
