= Eterno (Prince Royce album) =

Studio album by Prince Royce
- Released: May 16, 2025
- Recorded: 2024–2025
- Genres: Bachata; pop; R&B
- Length: 38:50
- Languages: Spanish; English; Spanglish
- Labels: Sony Latin; Smiling Prince Music, Inc.
- Producers: Prince Royce; D'lesly "Dice" Lora; Edgar Barrera; Luis Miguel Gómez Castaño

Prince Royce chronology
Llamada Perdida (2020)	Eterno (2025)	Better Late Than Never (2025)

Singles from Eterno
- 1. "How Deep Is Your Love" Released: April 10, 2025; 2. "I Want It That Way" Released: May 15, 2025

ETERNO (transl. "Eternal") is a cover album by American singer and songwriter Prince Royce. It was released on May 16, 2025, under Sony Music Latin, and Royce's music company Smiling Prince Music, Inc. The album consist of 13 songs from artists that sing in English, performed in bachata and in Spanglish. Its first single is Royce's cover of "How Deep Is Your Love", a song by the Bee Gees.

== Track listing ==
No.	Title	Length
1.	"Dancing in the Moonlight"	2:41
2.	"How Deep Is Your Love"	3:19
3.	"Stuck On You"	3:27
4.	"Right Here Waiting"	3:21
5.	"Can't Help Falling in Love"	2:30
6.	"All Out of Love"	2:52
7.	"If Only for One Night"	3:17
8.	"Yesterday"	2:17
9.	"I Want It That Way"	2:36
10.	"My Girl"	2:55
11.	"Killing Me Softly"	3:13
12.	"I Just Called to Say I Love You"	2:30
13.	"Go Your Own Way"	3:47
Total length:		38:50

== Charts ==
Weekly chart performance for Eterno
Chart (2025)	Peak position
US Top Latin Albums (Billboard)	45
US Tropical Albums (Billboard)	3
