= Cosas de la Peda =

Single by Prince Royce featuring Gabito Ballesteros

from the album Llamada Perdida
- Language: Spanish
- English title: "Drunk Things"
- Released: January 16, 2024
- Genre: Bachata; corridos tumbados
- Length: 2:41
- Label: Sony Latin; Smiling Prince Music Inc
- Songwriters: Andrés Jael Correa Rios; D'Lesley Lora; Daniel Candia; Edgar Barrera; Gabriel Ballesteros Abril; Geoffrey Royce Rojas; Luis Miguel Gómez Castaño
- Producers: Edgar Barrera; Casta

Prince Royce singles chronology
"Me EnRD" (2023)	"Cosas de la Peda" (2024)	"Morfina" (2024)

Gabito Ballesteros singles chronology
"Otra Noche" (2022)	"Cosas de la Peda" (2024)	"Un Shot" (2024)

Music video
- "Cosas de la Peda" on YouTube

"Cosas de la Peda" (transl. "Drunk Things") is a song by Dominican-American singer Prince Royce featuring Mexican singer-songwriter Gabito Ballesteros. It was released on January 16, 2024, through Sony Music Latin and Smiling Prince Music, Inc., as the seventh and lead single for Royce's seventh studio album, Llamada Perdida (2024). It is a bachata song with elements of corridos tumbados, making it a bachata tumbada. The music video premiered on the same day as its audio release. They both performed the song the next day live at Good Morning America. Before its release, Royce and Ballesteros had performed the song live at Calibash on January 12, 2024.

== Charts ==
Chart (2024)	Peak position
Dominican Republic Bachata (Monitor Latino)	1
Dominican Republic General (Monitor Latino)	1
US Hot Latin Songs (Billboard)	46
US Latin Airplay (Billboard)	1
US Tropical Airplay (Billboard)	1
