= Te Espero =

Single by Prince Royce and Maria Becerra

from the album Llamada Perdida
- Language: Spanish
- English title: "I'll Wait For You"
- Released: March 3, 2022
- Genre: Bachata; Pop
- Length: 4:06
- Label: Sony Latin

Prince Royce singles chronology
"After Party" (2022)	"Te Espero" (2022)	"Si Te Preguntan..." (2022)

María Becerra singles chronology
"Felices x Siempre" (2022)	"Te Espero" (2022)	"Hasta los Dientes" (2022)

Music video
- "Te Espero" on YouTube

"Te Espero" is a song by American singer Prince Royce and Argentine singer María Becerra. The song was released on March 3, 2022, as the second single for Royce's seventh studio album, Llamada Perdida (2024). The song samples Cutting Crew's "(I Just) Died in Your Arms" (1986).

== Reception ==
=== Business performance ===
The single peaked at number 1 on the Billboard Tropical Airplay chart, marking Royce's 22nd number 1 and Becerra's first on the chart. In addition, the song reached the number 1 position on tropical music radio stations in the United States, Puerto Rico, Chile, Ecuador, the Dominican Republic, Colombia and Panama.

== Music video ==
The video clip was premiered on the same day as its audio release. It was directed by Julián Levy and its shooting took place in Buenos Aires for two days. The concept of the video develops a love story supported by a sensual dance during a police investigation, where Royce appears with a bulletproof vest and armed to rescue María Becerra who finds himself in the middle of multiple shots and chases.

== Charts ==
Chart (2022)	Peak position
Argentina Hot 100 (Billboard)	33
Dominican Republic Bachata (Monitor Latino)	1
Dominican Republic General (Monitor Latino)	1
Mexico Airplay (Billboard)	33
Mexico Español Airplay (Billboard)	21
US Hot Latin Songs (Billboard)	26
US Latin Airplay (Billboard)	1
US Tropical Airplay (Billboard)	1

== Certifications ==
Region	Certification	Certified units/sales
United States (RIAA)	2× Platinum (Latin)	120,000^{‡}
^{‡} Sales+streaming figures based on certification alone.
