= Si Te Preguntan... =

Single by Prince Royce, Nicky Jam and Jay Wheeler

from the album Llamada Perdida
- Language: Spanish
- English title: "If They Ask You..."
- Released: June 23, 2022
- Genre: Bachata
- Length: 3:43
- Label: Sony Latin

Prince Royce singles chronology
"Te Espero" (2022)	"Si Te Preguntan..." (2022)	"Otra Vez" (2022)

Nicky Jam singles chronology
"Ojos Rojos" (2022)	"Si Te Preguntan..." (2022)	"I See" (2022)

Jay Wheeler singles chronology
"Simulación" (2022)	"Si Te Preguntan..." (2022)	"Suelta" (2022)

Music video
- "Si Te Preguntan..." on YouTube

"Si Te Preguntan..." is a song by American singers Prince Royce and Nicky Jam and Puerto Rican singer Jay Wheeler. It was released on June 23, 2022. It is the third single for Royce's seventh studio album, Llamada Perdida. The music video premiered on the same day as its audio release. It received a lot of positive reviews on the video's comment section on YouTube.

== Charts ==
=== Weekly charts ===
Chart (2022)	Peak position
Dominican Republic Bachata (Monitor Latino)	1
Dominican Republic General (Monitor Latino)	1
Spain (PROMUSICAE)	96
US Hot Latin Songs (Billboard)	31
US Latin Airplay (Billboard)	3
US Tropical Airplay (Billboard)	2

== Certifications ==
Region	Certification	Certified units/sales
Spain (Promusicae)	Gold	50,000^{‡}
United States (RIAA)	3× Platinum (Latin)	180,000^{‡}
^{‡} Sales+streaming figures based on certification alone.
