= Sensualidad (song) =

Single by Bad Bunny, Prince Royce and J Balvin featuring Mambo Kingz and DJ Luian
- Language: Spanish
- English title: "Sensuality"
- Released: November 3, 2017
- Length: 4:56
- Label: Hear this Music
- Songwriters: Benito Martínez; Geoffrey Rojas; José Osorio; Edgar Semper-Vargas; Xavier Semper-Vargas; Luian Malave; Juan Frias
- Producers: Mambo Kingz; DJ Luian

Bad Bunny singles chronology
"Mala y Peligrosa" (2017)	"Sensualidad" (2017)	"Move Your Body" (2017)

Prince Royce singles chronology
"100 Años" (2017)	"Sensualidad" (2017)	"No Love" (2018)

J Balvin singles chronology
"Mi Gente" (2017)	"Sensualidad" (2017)	"Downtown" (2017)

Mambo Kingz singles chronology
"Pura Falsedad" (2017)	"Sensualidad" (2017)	"Solita" (2018)

DJ Luian singles chronology
"Pure" (2018)	"Sensualidad" (2017)	"Solita" (2018)

Music video
- "Sensualidad" on YouTube

"Sensualidad" (transl. "Sensuality") is a song by Puerto Rican rapper Bad Bunny, American singer Prince Royce, and Colombian singer J Balvin featuring producers Mambo Kingz and DJ Luian. It was released by Hear this Music on November 3, 2017 as a single. The song is the first top 10 hit for Mambo Kingz and DJ Luian on the US Billboard Hot Latin Songs chart. It also serves as Bad Bunny's first top 10 song as a lead artist on the chart.

== Music video ==
The accompanying music video for "Sensualidad" was uploaded to Hear This Music's YouTube channel on November 2, 2017. It was directed by Fernando Lugo and filmed in the Dominican Republic.

== Charts ==
=== Weekly charts ===
Chart (2017–18)	Peak position
Bolivia (Monitor Latino)	10
Colombia (Monitor Latino)	13
Colombia (National-Report)	11
Spain (Promusicae)	1
US Hot Latin Songs (Billboard)	8
US Latin Airplay (Billboard)	17
US Latin Rhythm Airplay (Billboard)	10

=== Year-end charts ===
Chart (2017)	Position
Spain (PROMUSICAE)	90

Chart (2018)	Position
Argentina (Monitor Latino)	91
Spain (PROMUSICAE)	46
US Hot Latin Songs (Billboard)	19

== Certifications ==
Region	Certification	Certified units/sales
Italy (FIMI)	Gold	25,000^{‡}
Spain (Promusicae)	3× Platinum	120,000^{‡}
United States (RIAA)	28× Platinum (Latin)	1,680,000^{‡}
^{‡} Sales+streaming figures based on certification alone.

== Release history ==
Region	Date	Format	Label	Ref.
Worldwide	November 3, 2017	Digital download	Hear this Music	
