= Me EnRD =

Single by Prince Royce

from the album Llamada Perdida
- Language: Spanish
- English title: "I Got Entangled"
- Released: April 20, 2023
- Genre: Bachata
- Length: 3:05
- Label: Sony Latin; Smiling Prince Music Inc
- Songwriters: Geoffrey Rojas; Yonathan "Mickey" Then; Yoel Henríquez; Mango; D’lesly "Dice" Lora
- Producers: Geoffrey Rojas; D’lesly "Dice" Lora

Prince Royce singles chronology
"Le Doy 20 Mil" (2023)	"Me EnRD" (2023)	"Cosas de la Peda" (2024)

Music video
- "Me EnRD" on YouTube

"Me EnRD" (short for "Me enrede en RD"; transl. "I Got Entangled in DR") is a song by Dominican-American singer Prince Royce. It was released on April 20, 2023. It is the sixth single for his seventh studio album, Llamada Perdida. Royce had released the single at 6pm. A few hours later, he performed the song live at the 8th Annual Latin American Music Awards of 2023.

== Music video ==
The music video premiered on the same day as its audio release. It was filmed in the Dominican Republic, and was directed by Fernando Lugo.

== Charts ==
Chart (2023)	Peak position
Dominican Republic Bachata (Monitor Latino)	1
Dominican Republic General (Monitor Latino)	4
US Latin Airplay (Billboard)	1
US Tropical Airplay (Billboard)	1
