= Prince Royce =

American singer (born 1989)

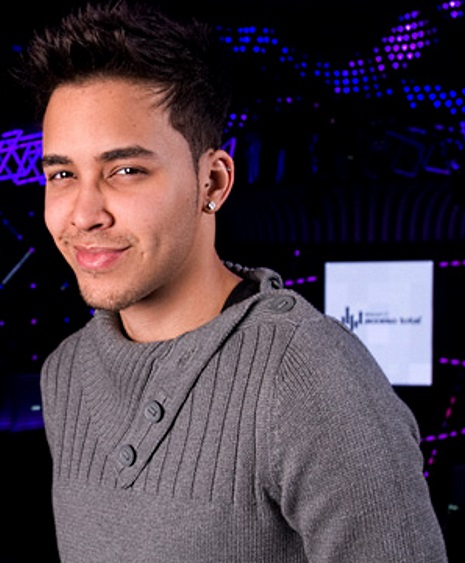
- Royce in 2012
- Born: Geoffrey Royce Rojas; May 11, 1989 (age 37); New York City, U.S.
- Occupations: Singer; songwriter; actor
- Years active: 2008–present
- Spouse: Emeraude Toubia (m. 2018; div. 2022)
- Awards: Full list
- Musical career
- Genres: Latin pop; bachata; R&B
- Labels: Top Stop; Sony Latin; RCA
- Website: princeroyce.com

Geoffrey Royce Rojas (born May 11, 1989), known professionally as Prince Royce, is an American singer. At an early age, Royce took an interest in music, and in his teenage years began experimenting with music and writing poetry. By age nineteen, Royce met Andrés Hidalgo, who became his manager. Hidalgo later introduced Royce to record producer Sergio George, who immediately signed him to his label after hearing three of his demos.

In March 2010, Royce released his eponymous debut studio album, which generated two commercially successful singles, "Stand by Me" and "Corazón Sin Cara". In the United States, both songs reached number-one on the Billboard Tropical Songs chart, while "Corazón Sin Cara" reached number-one on the Billboard Hot Latin Songs chart. The album itself reached number-one on the US Billboard Top Latin Albums and Tropical Albums charts. Royce received three awards at the Billboard Latin Music Awards in 2011, which included Tropical Album of the Year. In 2012, Royce released his second studio album, Phase II, which reached number-one on both the US Latin Albums and Tropical Albums charts. The album featured the singles "Las Cosas Pequeñas" and "Incondicional" and was nominated for the Latin Grammy Award for Best Tropical Fusion Album.

His third studio album, Soy el Mismo, was released in 2013, preceded by the single "Darte un Beso". The album earned Royce his second nomination for the Latin Grammy Award for Best Contemporary Tropical Album. In 2015, Royce released his fourth studio album, Double Vision, his first primarily in the English language. The album included the singles "Stuck on a Feeling" featuring Snoop Dogg and "Back It Up" featuring Jennifer Lopez and Pitbull, with both charting on the Billboard Hot 100.

Five was released as Royce's fifth studio album in 2017. It became Royce's fourth number-one album on the Billboard Top Latin Albums chart. The album's last single, "Déjà Vu", with Shakira, became its most successful commercially and was certified 9× Platinum (Latin) by the Recording Industry Association of America (RIAA) in the US.

== Early life ==
Geoffrey Royce Rojas was born and raised in The Bronx, a borough of New York City. He is the second oldest of four children, born to Dominican parents. His father, Ramón Rojas, drove a taxicab and his mother, Ángela de León, worked at a beauty salon. When he was young, Royce participated in choir in elementary school, competed in talent shows and, at the age of thirteen, began writing poetry, which turned into songwriting. Recalling his first time performing before a crowd, he said: "[In] elementary school, I was singing a Christmas song. I felt really comfortable on stage."

== Career ==
=== 2004–09: Beginnings ===
At age fifteen, Royce had begun making music with a partner named José Chusán, better known as "Jino". The duo was also known as "Jino and Royce, El Dúo Real". At the age of sixteen, Royce adopted the stage name "Prince Royce" and started making music with longtime friend and record producer Donzell Rodríguez, and Vincent Outerbridge, known together as "L Snipe & Vinny". The duo eventually had a meeting with Atlantic Records in early 2007. With the decline of reggaeton music in the Latin music industry at the time, Royce made the ultimate decision to focus on making bachata music. At age nineteen, Royce met producer Andrés Hidalgo, who after hearing his demos, instantly became his manager. Hidalgo began helping Royce work hands-on with bachata music. That was the turning point that helped Royce decide that he wanted to pursue a musical career. Hidalgo later introduced Royce to record producer Sergio George, who immediately signed Royce to his label, Top Stop Music, after listening to three of his demos.

=== 2010–11: Prince Royce ===
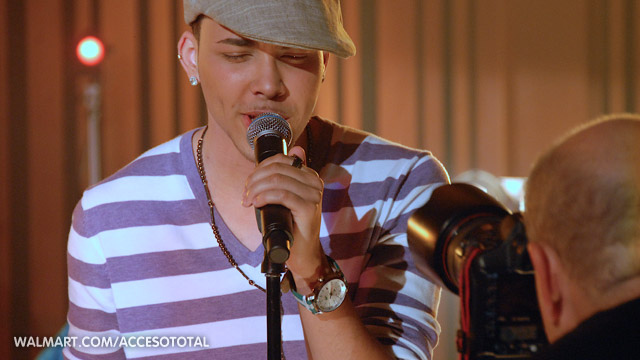
Royce performing in 2010

Royce released his eponymous debut studio album on March 2, 2010. The album was produced primarily by Hidalgo and Sergio George, with co-production duties by Royce. AllMusic's Jason Birchmeier credited Hidalgo for the "crisp production job, which is often spare but adds touches of urban beats here and there." Shortly after its release, the album debuted on the Billboard Top Latin Albums chart at number fifteen. The lead single from the album, "Stand by Me" (a cover of Ben E. King's 1961 song) peaked at number-one on the US Billboard Tropical Songs chart, and also reached number eight on the US Billboard Hot Latin Songs chart. The album's second single, "Corazón Sin Cara", was released in February 2010 and peaked at number-one on both the US Hot Latin Songs and Tropical Songs charts. The album itself eventually reached number-one on the US Billboard Latin Albums chart and was certified double platinum by the Recording Industry Association of America (RIAA). In December 2010, Royce recorded a song with Sergio George called "El Campo de los Sueños", which was used as the theme song for the television program Domingo de Grandes Ligas on American TV sports network ESPN in its 2010 season.

The album earned Royce a nomination for Best Contemporary Tropical Album at the Latin Grammy Awards of 2011. At the awards ceremony, Royce performed "Stand by Me" alongside the song's original performer Ben E. King. At the 2011 Premio Lo Nuestro Awards, Royce won three awards in the Tropical genre, including Male Artist of the Year, New Soloist or Group of the Year, and Song of the Year for "Stand by Me". Royce was also nominated for six awards at the 2011 Latin Billboard Music Awards. Ultimately, he won three of them: Tropical Airplay Solo Artist of the Year, Tropical Album of the Year for Prince Royce, and Tropical Albums Solo Artist of the Year. In April 2011, Royce collaborated with Puerto Rican reggaeton artist Daddy Yankee on the song "Ven Conmigo", which was included on the latter's album, Prestige (2012). The song became Royce's third top-ten hit in the US Hot Latin Songs chart, peaking at number nine. In May 2011, Royce signed with Atlantic Records to release English-language albums in a joint partnership with the Top Stop Music label. Royce then began working on his second studio album, which was said to be mostly in English with Latin music influences. That same month, Spanish pop star Enrique Iglesias announced that Royce and American rapper Pitbull would be joining him as special guests during a concert leg of his Euphoria Tour, which began in mid-September 2011. Then, in October, Mexican rock band Maná remixed their single "El Verdadero Amor Perdona" into a bachata version with Royce as a featured artist. The song, from the deluxe edition of the band's album Drama y Luz (2011), topped the Billboard Hot Latin Songs chart in late 2011, becoming Royce's second number-one single on the ranking.

=== 2012: Phase II and #1's ===
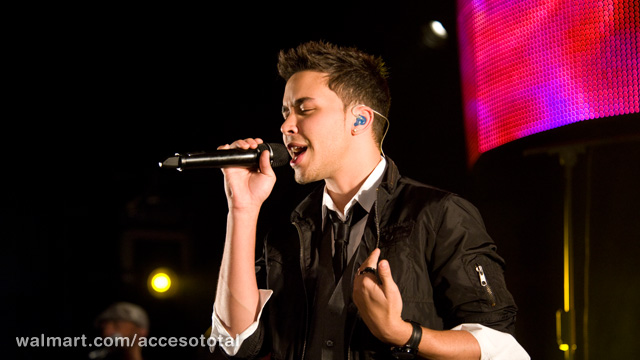
Royce on Acceso Total in 2012

On April 10, 2012, Prince Royce released his second studio album, Phase II. The 13-track album incorporated a variety of music styles, from bachata to mariachi. The album contained songs in both English and Spanish, as well as melodies atypical to traditional bachata music. "Las Cosas Pequeñas" debuted at number-one on the Billboard Tropical Songs chart, and eventually reached number-one on the Billboard Latin Songs chart. The week of Phase II's release, Royce attended four autograph signing events in the United States. His appearance at a f.y.e. location in Chicago broke an attendance record for most visitors to an in-store music event. Later in 2012, he was featured as one of People en Español's "Sexiest Men Alive". Royce's second album was certified platinum in the US six months after its release. It was later nominated for Best Tropical Fusion Album at the Latin Grammy Awards of 2012, making Royce a three-time Latin Grammy-nominated artist.

In November 2012, Royce's label decided to release a collection of his hits thus far; titled #1's, the compilation album was released on November 19, 2012, and debuted at number three on the Billboard Latin Albums chart. Included on the album are the songs "Stand by Me", "Corazon Sin Cara", "Las Cosas Pequeñas", "Incondicional", and "Te Me Vas". It peaked at number three on the Billboard Latin Albums chart and was certified platinum by RIAA. The album was later nominated for Tropical Album of the Year at the 2014 Latin Billboard Music Awards.

=== 2013-14: Signing with Sony and Soy El Mismo ===
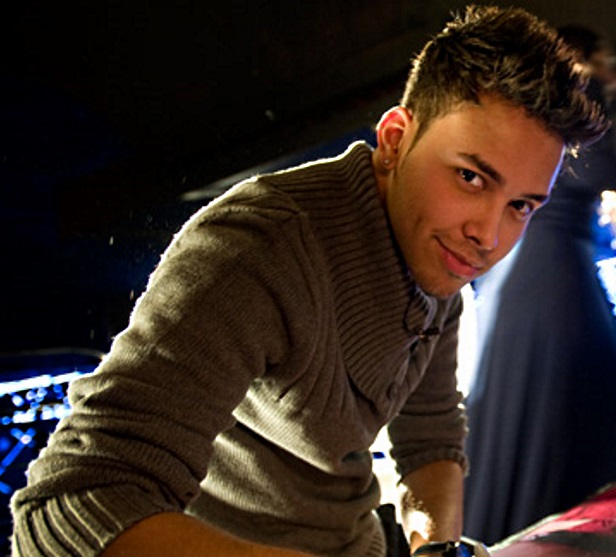
Royce on Acceso Total in 2012

In April 2013, it was announced that Royce had signed a record deal with Sony Music Entertainment to release his third Spanish-language studio album under Sony Music Latin and debut English-language recording under RCA Records. This came after the fizzled relationship between Royce and Top Stop that ended in two lawsuits, in which Royce was sued by the label for breach of contract. In a statement, Peter Edge, the CEO of RCA Records, said: "We are thrilled about the opportunity to work with such a dynamic Latin artist on his first English album. Prince Royce's early successes have paved the way for the next generation of Latin music and we are eager to join forces with our partners Sony Music Latin to fully maximize his music and career." That same year, Royce was honored with the BMI Latin Songwriter of the Year. Royce was also one of the three coaches on Telemundo's La Voz Kids, a singing competition featuring children aged 7–15 with a $50,000 prize for their education. He became the winning coach for the first season with his team member Paola Guanche, and again in the second season with Amanda Mena. He was replaced by Daddy Yankee for season three.

On July 15, 2013, the lead single from Royce's next studio album was released, "Darte un Beso". It reached number-one on multiple Latin charts and was certified three-times platinum in the Latin field. His third album, Soy el Mismo, was released on October 8, 2013, and reached number fourteen on the Billboard 200. The album earned Royce his second nomination for Best Contemporary Tropical Album at the Latin Grammy Awards of 2014. He was then nominated for three awards at the 2014 Billboard Music Awards, for Top Latin Artist, Top Latin Album for Soy el Mismo, and Top Latin Song for "Darte un Beso". The latter won the award for Streaming Song of the Year at the 2014 Latin Billboard Music Awards.

=== 2014–15: Double Vision ===
In April 2014, Royce and Brazilian musician Michel Teló recorded a Portuguese-language version of "Darte un Beso" under the title "Te Dar um Beijo". On November 24, 2014, Royce released "Stuck on a Feeling" featuring Snoop Dogg as the first single from his fourth studio album, Double Vision. The single is Royce's best-performing single in the United States to date, having reached number forty-three on the Billboard Hot 100. In early 2015, he contributed the song "My Angel" to the soundtrack album for the blockbuster film Furious 7 (2015). On March 24, 2015, Royce released "Qué Cosas Tiene el Amor", a co-lead single with Dominican Republic singer Anthony Santos. In March 2015, it was announced that Royce would join Ariana Grande's The Honeymoon Tour as the opening act for 40 dates in the United States. Royce's first album primarily in the English language, Double Vision was released on July 24, 2015, preceded by the album's second single, "Back It Up" featuring Jennifer Lopez and Pitbull, which was released in May 2015. The single reached number ten on the US Latin Pop Songs chart and number ninety-two on the Billboard Hot 100. The Spanish-language version of the song was nominated for the Latin Grammy Award for Best Urban Song, making Royce an eight-time Latin Grammy-nominated performer.

=== 2016–17: Five ===
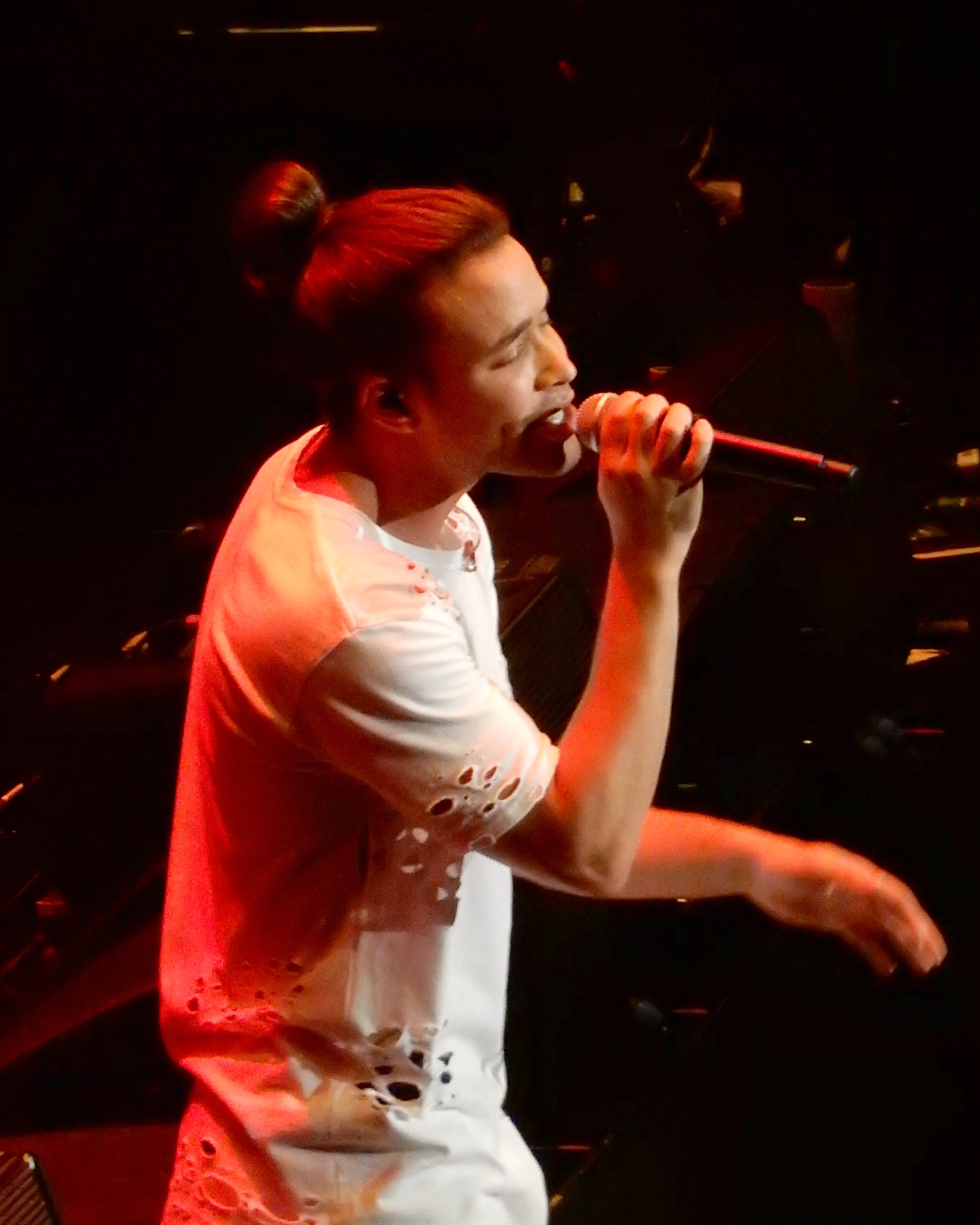
Prince Royce Opening for Pitbull in Newark, NJ in 2016.

In November 2015, Royce released the single "Culpa al Corazón", at the time from his forthcoming fifth studio album. The music video for the single, which was released in January 2016, featured actress Emeraude Toubia, whom Royce had been romantically linked to since 2011.

On January 29, 2016, the single "Solo Yo" was released as a vocal duet credited to Mexican singer Sofía Reyes and Royce. At the Premios Lo Nuestro 2017 awards ceremony, the song received a nomination for Pop Song of the Year. On March 11, 2016, "Nobody But Me", an English version of "Solo Yo", was also released as a single. On March 20, 2016, Royce starred as Saint Peter in the Fox Broadcasting Company live musical production of the Biblical story The Passion. Also in 2016, he had a recurring role as dancing coach Vincent on the fourth season of Hulu's teen drama series East Los High. In July 2016, Royce embarked on a North American concert tour with Pitbull, titled The Bad Man Tour. Also that July, Royce became one of approximately 27 artists to lend their voices to "Hands", a charity single recorded as a tribute to victims of the Orlando nightclub shooting. All of the song's proceeds benefited the families affected during the shooting, and helped cover medical costs and counseling efforts.

Five, Royce's fifth studio album, was released on February 24, 2017, by Sony Music Latin. The album included collaborations with artists such as Shakira, Chris Brown, Zendaya, Farruko, Gerardo Ortíz, Gente de Zona and Arturo Sandoval. Although the album contains some lyrics in English, it was Royce's first mainly Spanish-language album since Soy el Mismo in 2013. Five also became Royce's fourth number-one album on the Billboard Top Latin Albums chart in the US. Between 2016 and 2017 four singles were released to promote the album: "La Carretera", "Moneda", "Ganas Locas", and "Déjà Vu". This last single became the album's most successful commercially and was certified 9× Platinum (Latin) by the Recording Industry Association of America (RIAA) in the US.

After promotion for Five ended, Royce released two additional singles in late 2017. The first was "100 Años", a collaboration with American musical duo Ha*Ash. The song served as the first single from the duo's fifth studio album 30 de Febrero (2017). Afterwards, Royce appeared in "Sensualidad" together with producers DJ Luian and Mambo Kingz and rappers Bad Bunny and J Balvin. The single became a new top 10 hit for Royce on the US Hot Latin Songs chart, where it peaked at number eight.

=== 2018–20: Alter Ego ===
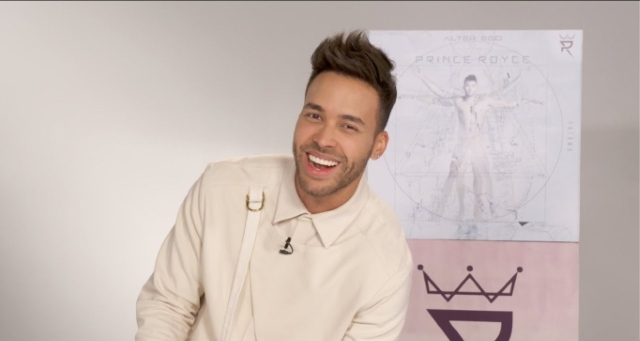
Royce in 2020

Ahead of his forthcoming sixth studio album, Alter Ego, Royce released various singles and collaborated with a number of different artists during 2018 and 2019. Among his most notable releases during this period was "Bubalú", a new collaboration with producers DJ Luian and Mambo Kingz featuring Puerto Rican rapper Anuel AA and American singer Becky G. The single was released on November 6, 2018, and became a Top 30 hit on the Hot Latin Songs chart in the US.

Royce was included as a guest appearance in Pitbull's "I Believe That We Will Win (World Anthem)" official music video, in which all proceeds from the song's sales, streaming and views are being donated to Feeding America and the Anthony Robbins Foundation as relief to those affected by the COVID-19 pandemic.

One of the singles from the album, "Carita de Inocente", spent a record-breaking 29 weeks at number-one on the Billboard Latin Tropical Airplay chart. A remix was made for this song which featured Puerto Rican artist Myke Towers.

=== 2021-2024: Classic Tour and Llamada Perdida ===
In 2021, it was confirmed that Royce was working on his seventh studio album. He released the first single for the album, which is also the first single since the COVID-19 pandemic, titled "Lao' a Lao'" on August 12, 2021. On the Billboard charts, it peaked at number 23 on the Hot Latin Songs chart, and at number 1 on both the Latin and Tropical Airplay charts. It also peaked at number 1 on the Monitor Latino Dominican Republic Bachata and General charts. It was certified platinum by the Recording Industry Association of America (RIAA). Royce released an alternate version on December 17, 2021. On December 2, 2021, he released "Veterana" with Dominican Bachata singer Elvis Martínez. It peaked at number 7 on the Billboard Tropical Airplay charts. It also peaked at number 1 on the Monitor Latino Dominican Republic Bachata and General charts. It is featured on Martinez's tenth studio album Mi Muchachita (2022).

On February 3, 2022, Royce, along with Farruko and Colombian DJ Alex Sensation, released the single "After Party", which featured Mariah Angeliq and Vincentian soca singer Kevin Lyttle. On March 3, 2022, he released "Te Espero" with Argentine singer María Becerra. The song was a huge success as it became number 1 on tropical radio stations in United States, Puerto Rico, Chile, Ecuador, the Dominican Republic, Colombia and Panama. It was also number 1 overall on the radio in Chile and Ecuador. On the Billboard charts, it peaked at number 33 on the Argentina Hot 100 chart, at number 26 on the Hot Latin Songs chart, and at number 1 on both the Latin and Tropical Airplay charts. On June 23, 2022, he released "Si Te Preguntan..." with Puerto Rican artists Nicky Jam and Jay Wheeler. On Billboard charts, it peaked at number 26 on the Hot Latin Songs chart, at number 3 on the Latin chart, and at number 2 on the Tropical Airplay chart. It also peaked at number 1 on the Monitor Latino Dominican Republic Bachata and General charts. In the same year, Royce embarked on a tour based on his greatest hits. He called it the Classic Tour. It started on September 16, in Miami, Florida, and ended on November 19, 2022, in Guayaquil, Ecuador. It included two sold out shows at the United Palace in New York City on September 30, and October 1, 2022. On December 8, 2022, Royce released "Otra Vez" as his final single for 2022. On the Billboard charts, it peaked at number 26 on the Latin Airplay chart, and at number 6 on the Tropical Airplay chart. On the Monitor Latino's Dominican Republic charts, it peaked at number 2 on the General chart, and at number 1 on Bachata charts.

On February 9, 2023, he released "Le Doy 20 Mil" with Dominican rapper El Alfa. It peaked at number 20 on the Billboard Latin Rhythm Airplay chart. It also peaked at number 2 on the Monitor Latino Dominican Republic Urban and General charts. The following month Prince Royce was introduced as a new coach for The Voice Chile, season 4. On April 20, 2023, he released "Me EnRD". The song was released at 6pm of that day. A few hours later, he performed the song live at the 8th Annual Latin American Music Awards of 2023. On the Billboard charts, it peaked at number 4 on the Latin Airplay chart and at number 1 on the Tropical Airplay charts. On Monitor Latino Dominican Republic Dominican Republic charts, it peaked at number 6 on the General chart and at number 1 on the Bachata chart.

On January 16, 2024, he announced the title and released date of his seventh studio album. It is titled Llamada Perdida. One hour later, he released the album's seventh and main single "Cosas de la Peda" with Mexican singer-songwriter Gabito Ballesteros. It peaked at number 1 on the Billboard Tropical Airplay charts. On February 15, 2024, one day before the album's release, he released the music video for the song "Morfina" featuring Chilean-American singer-songwriter Paloma Mami. The album was released the next day. It features collaborations with Ala Jaza, María Becerra, A Boogie wit da Hoodie, Luis Miguel del Amargue, Gabito Ballesteros, Paloma Mami, Lenny Tavárez, Nicky Jam, Jay Wheeler, and El Alfa. Three weeks later, Royce, along with Mexican singer Carlos Rivera, released the single Calumnia on March 7, 2024.

=== 2025–present: ETERNO and Better Late Than Never ===
On May 16, 2025, Royce released a cover album titled ETERNO. The album featured 13 songs from some of American music's biggest artists from the 20th century in Spanglish bachata cover songs.

On November 28, 2025, Royce released the surprise collaborative album Better Late Than Never with Romeo Santos. The next month, the Mejor Tarde Que Nunca Tour was announced for 2026.

== Artistry ==
=== Influences ===
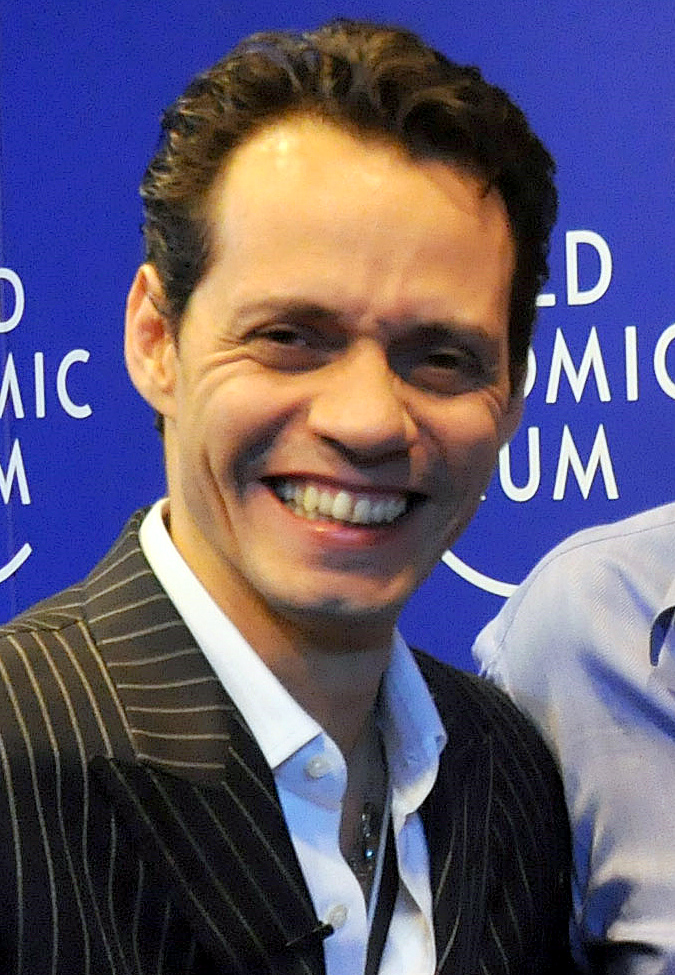
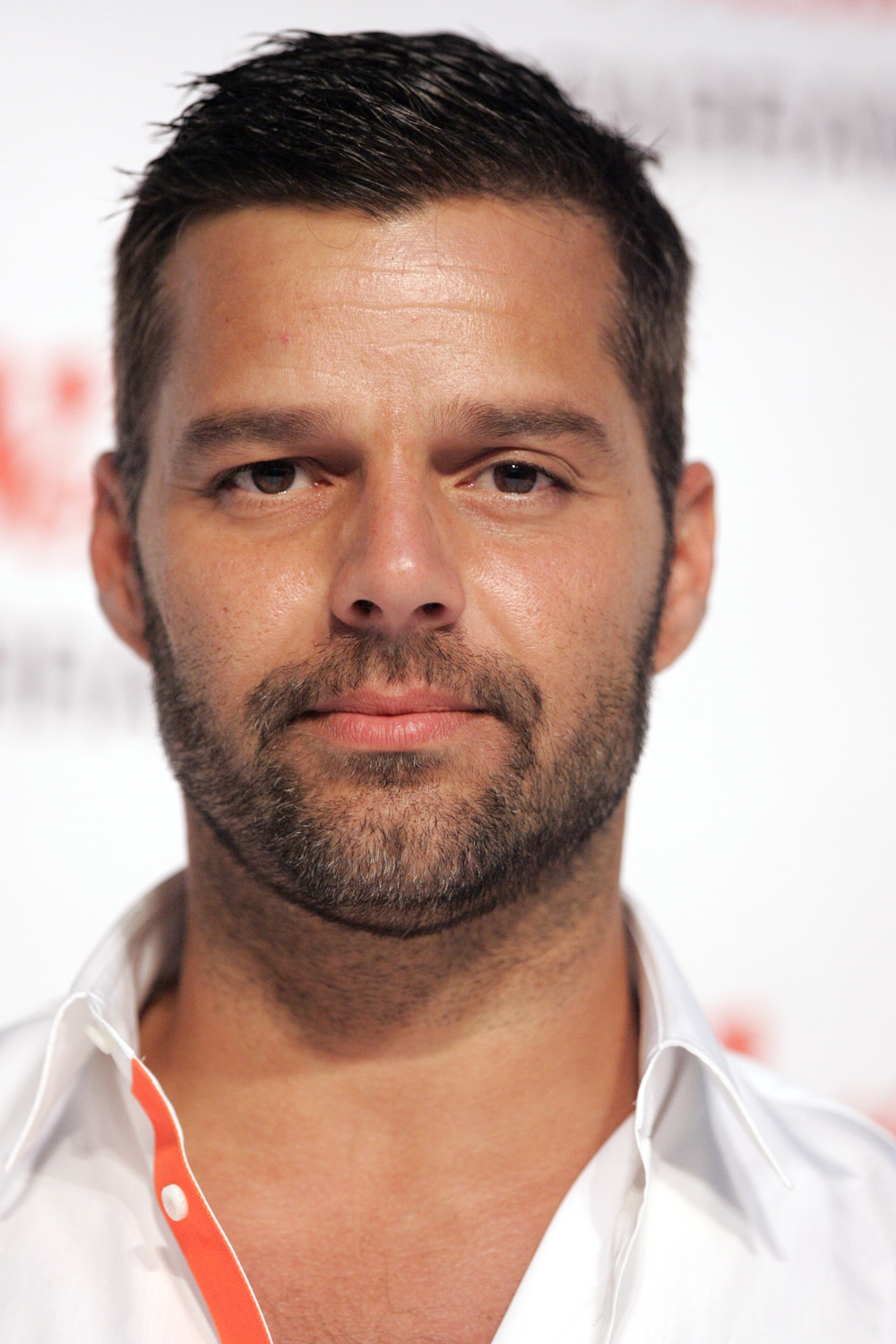
Royce has cited Marc Anthony (left) and Ricky Martin (right) as two of his influences.

Royce cites Marc Anthony, Usher, and Jay-Z as his greatest musical influences. He also mentioned Gloria Estefan, Ricky Martin, Enrique Iglesias, Jennifer Lopez, and Shakira as the artists who influenced American culture with Latin music. In his genre, he cites Aventura, who are also his greatest musical influences. In an interview with mitú, he stated: "Looking back and seeing people saying I inspired them to do music, I think that's what you do this for. I look at people like Marc Anthony, Shakira, and Ricky Martin, what they've done, and how I see them as iconic. That's what you do this for. To try to leave that imprint. Try to leave your music and let people remember it forever."

=== Themes, genres, and musical style ===
Royce's music style is urban Bachata. He mixes Bachata with other genres, mostly Pop and Contemporary R&B. His first three studio albums featured songs with soft and smooth relaxing melodies. Then in 2015, he started to release a more party like type music while still keeping the same guitar sound style he always used. He has also done non-bachata songs in Pop, R&B, and even Latin Urban music as well.

== Personal life ==
Royce had been romantically linked to actress Emeraude Toubia since 2011, and in April 2016, the couple publicly confirmed their relationship. He reportedly became engaged to Toubia in June 2017. The couple civilly married on November 30, 2018, followed by a small, intimate ceremony in San Miguel de Allende, Mexico. On March 7, 2022, the couple filed for divorce. The divorce played a huge role in the making of his seventh studio album Llamada Perdida (2024).

== Filmography ==
Year	Title	Role	Notes	Ref.
2013	The Voice Kids	Himself	Season 1–2; Coach	
2013	11-11: En mi cuadra nada cuadra	Himself	Episode: "Bienvenido a 11-11"	
2016	Dora and Friends: Into the City!	Wizard (voice)	2 episodes	
2016	The Passion	Saint Peter	Television special	
2016	East Los High	Vincent	4 episodes	
2017	Pequeños Gigantes USA	Himself	Judge	
2018–19	Elena of Avalor	Prince Marzel (voice)	4 episodes	
2019	Lip Sync Battle	Himself	season 5: episode 12	
2021	12 Hours With	Himself	season 1: episode 3	
2025	Velvet: El nuevo imperio	Himself	Guest Star	

== Discography ==
Solo studio albums

- Prince Royce (2010)
- Phase II (2012)
- Soy el Mismo (2013)
- Double Vision (2015)
- Five (2017)
- Alter Ego (2020)
- Llamada Perdida (2024)

Collaborative studio albums

- Better Late Than Never (with Romeo Santos) (2025)

== Tours ==
Headlining

- Phase II Tour (2012)
- Soy el Mismo Tour (2014)
- Five World Tour (2017)
- Alter Ego Tour (2020)
- Classic Tour (2022)
- Llamada Perdida Tour (2024)

Co-headlining

- Power and Love Tour (with Wisin) (2014)
- Bad Man Tour (with Pitbull) (2016)
- Mejor Tarde Que Nunca (with Romeo Santos) (2026)

Opening act

- Euphoria Tour (for Enrique Iglesias) (2011)
- The Honeymoon Tour (for Ariana Grande) (2015)

== See also ==
- List of best-selling Latin music artists
