= Prince Royce discography =

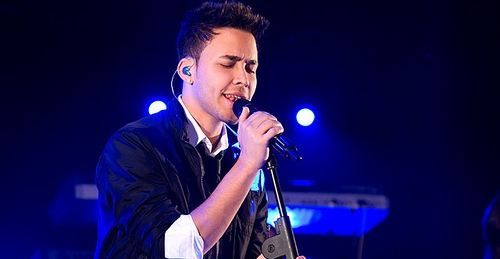
- Royce performing in May 2012
- Studio albums: 6
- EPs: 1
- Compilation albums: 1
- Singles: 55
- Music videos: 57

American singer Prince Royce has released seven studio albums, a compilation album, one extended play (EP), 55 singles (48 as a lead artist and 8 as a featured artist) and 57 music videos in Spanish, English, and Portuguese.

In March 2010, Royce released his eponymous debut studio album, which generated two commercially successful singles, "Stand by Me" and "Corazón Sin Cara". In the United States, both songs reached number-one on the Billboard Tropical Songs chart, while "Corazón Sin Cara" reached number-one on the Billboard Hot Latin Songs chart. The album itself reached number-one on the US Billboard Top Latin Albums and Tropical Albums charts. Royce received three awards at the Billboard Latin Music Awards in 2011, which included Tropical Album of the Year. On April 10, 2012, Royce released his second studio album, Phase II, which reached number-one on both the US Latin Albums and Tropical Albums charts. The album featured the singles "Las Cosas Pequeñas" and "Incondicional" and was nominated for the Latin Grammy Award for Best Tropical Fusion Album.

His third studio album, Soy el Mismo, was released on October 8, 2013, preceded by the single "Darte un Beso". The album earned Royce his second nomination for the Latin Grammy Award for Best Contemporary Tropical Album. On July 24, 2015, Royce released his fourth studio album, Double Vision, his first full English-language album. The album included the singles "Stuck on a Feeling" featuring Snoop Dogg and "Back It Up" featuring Jennifer Lopez and Pitbull, with both charting on the US Billboard Hot 100.

Five was released as Royce's fifth studio album on February 24, 2017. It became Royce's fourth number-one album on the Billboard Top Latin Albums chart. The album's last single, "Déjà Vu", with Shakira, became its most successful commercially and was certified 9× Platinum (Latin) by the Recording Industry Association of America (RIAA) in the US.

== Albums ==
=== Studio albums ===
List of studio albums, with selected chart positions, sales figures, and certifications
Title	Album details	Peak chart positions						Sales	Certifications
Title	Album details	US	US Latin	US Trop.	ARG	MEX	SPA	Sales	Certifications
Prince Royce	Released: March 2, 2010; Label: Top Stop Music; Format: CD, digital download	77	1	1	—	—	—	US: 357,000; Chile: 22,500	RIAA: 13× Platinum (Latin); IFPI CHI: 2× Platinum
Phase II	Released: April 10, 2012; Label: Top Stop Music; Format: CD, digital download	16	1	1	—	—	—	US: 111,000	RIAA: Platinum (Latin)
Soy el Mismo	Released: October 8, 2013; Label: Sony Music Latin; Format: CD, digital download	14	1	1	—	4	84	US: 99,000; Mexico: 30,000	RIAA: 8× Platinum (Latin); AMPROFON: Gold
Double Vision	Released: July 28, 2015; Label: RCA; Format: CD, digital download	21	—	—	6	39	—		RIAA: 2× Platinum (Latin)
Five	Released: February 28, 2017; Label: Sony Music Latin; Format: CD, digital download, streaming	25	1	10	—	48			RIAA: 7× Platinum (Latin); AMPROFON: Platinum
Alter Ego	Released: February 11, 2020; Label: Sony Music Latin; Format: CD, digital download, streaming	67	1	1	—	—	—		RIAA: 6× Platinum (Latin); AMPROFON: Gold
Llamada Perdida	Released: February 16, 2024; Label: Sony Music Latin; Formats: Digital download, streaming	—	18	2	—	—	52		RIAA: 2× Platinum (Latin)

=== Collaborative studio albums ===
List of collaborative studio albums
Title	Album details	Peak chart positions					Certifications
Title	Album details	US	US Latin	US Trop.	SPA	SWI	Certifications
Better Late Than Never (with Prince Royce (with Romeo Santos)	Released: November 28, 2025; Label: Sony Latin; Format: CD, LP, digital download, streaming	32	2	1	6	13	RIAA: 2× Platinum (Latin)

=== Compilation albums ===
List of compilation albums, with selected chart positions and certifications
Title	Album details	Peak chart positions		Certifications
Title	Album details	US Latin	US Trop.	Certifications
#1's	Released: November 19, 2012; Label: Top Stop Music; Format: CD, digital download	3	1	RIAA: Platinum (Latin)

=== Cover albums ===
Title	Album details	Peak chart positions	
Title	Album details	US Latin	US Trop.
Eterno	Released: May 16, 2025; Label: Sony Music Latin; Format: Streaming	45	3

== Extended plays ==
Title	Details
Spotify Singles	Released: 12 July 2017; Label: Sony Music Entertainment US Latin LLC; Format: Streaming

== Singles ==
=== As lead artist ===
==== Spanish and Portuguese-language ====
List of Spanish and Portuguese singles as lead artist, with selected chart positions and certifications, showing year released and album name
Title	Year	Peak chart positions							Certifications	Album
Title	Year	US	US Latin	US Trop	DOM	ARG	MEX	SPA	Certifications	Album
"Stand By Me"	2010	— (Note: "Stand by Me" did not enter the Billboard Hot 100, but peaked at number nine on the Bubbling Under Hot 100 Singles chart.)	8	1	—	—	—	—		Prince Royce
"Corazón Sin Cara"	2010	— (Note: "Corazón Sin Cara" did not enter the Billboard Hot 100, but peaked at number three on the Bubbling Under Hot 100 Singles chart.)	1	1	—	—	—	—	RIAA: 26× Platinum (Latin)	Prince Royce
"El Amor Que Perdimos"	2011	—	16	17	—	—	—	—	RIAA: Diamond (Latin)	Prince Royce
"Mi Última Carta"	2011	—	19	2	—	—	—	—		Prince Royce
"Las Cosas Pequeñas"	2012	— (Note: "Las Cosas Pequeñas" did not enter the Billboard Hot 100, but peaked at number eight on the Bubbling Under Hot 100 Singles chart.)	1	1	—	—	—	—	RIAA: 3× Platinum (Latin)	Phase II
"Incondicional"	2012	— (Note: "Incondicional" did not enter the Billboard Hot 100, but peaked at number 11 on the Bubbling Under Hot 100 Singles chart.)	2	1	—	—	30	—	RIAA: 4× Platinum (Latin)	Phase II
"Te Me Vas"	2012	—	2	1	—	—	—	—		Phase II
"Darte un Beso"	2013	78	1	1	1	—	1	32	RIAA: 31× Platinum (Latin); AMPROFON: Diamond+Platinum; PROMUSICAE: Platinum	Soy el Mismo
"Te Robaré"	2014	—	4	1	—	—	5	29	RIAA: 7× Platinum (Latin)	Soy el Mismo
"Nada"	2014	—	—	—	—	—	8	—		Soy el Mismo
"Te Dar um Beijo" (featuring Michel Teló)	2014	—	—	—	—	—	—	—		Non-album single
"Soy el Mismo"/Band version (Duet with Roberto Tapia)	2014	—	8	1	—	—	—	—	RIAA: 5× Platinum (Latin)	Soy el Mismo
"Solita"	2015	—	13	1	—	—	—	—		Soy el Mismo
"Qué Cosas Tiene el Amor" (with Anthony Santos)	2015	—	—	1	3	—	—	—		Tócame
"Back It Up" (featuring Jennifer Lopez and Pitbull)	2015	92	19	7	—	—	—	40	RIAA: Gold; PROMUSICAE: Gold; ZPAV: Gold	Double Vision
"Culpa al Corazón"	2015	—	8	1	1	—	—	—	RIAA: 6× Platinum (Latin)	Five
"Solo Yo" (with Sofía Reyes)	2016	—	35	27	—	—	—	—	RIAA: Gold (Latin)	Louder!
"La Carretera"	2016	—	8	1	—	—	—	—	RIAA: 9× Platinum (Latin); AMPROFON: Platinum+Gold	Five
"Moneda" (with Gerardo Ortiz)	2016	—	22	1	—	—	—	—	RIAA: 3× Platinum (Latin)	Five
"Déjà Vu" (with Shakira)	2017	— (Note: "Deja Vu" did not enter the Billboard Hot 100, but peaked at number seven on the Bubbling Under Hot 100 Singles chart.)	4	1	1	—	—	4	RIAA: 15× Platinum (Latin); AMPROFON: 3× Platinum; PROMUSICAE: Platinum	Five
"Ganas Locas" (with Farruko)	2017	—	—	6	—	—	—	—	RIAA: 3× Platinum (Latin)	Five
"100 Años" (with Ha*Ash)	2017	—	—	—	—	—	1	—	AMPROFON: 4× Platinum	30 de Febrero
"Sensualidad" (DJ Luian and Mambo Kingz present Bad Bunny, J Balvin and Prince Royce)	2017	—	8	—	—	—	—	1	RIAA: 28× Platinum (Latin); PROMUSICAE: 3× Platinum	Non-album singles
"No Love" (with Trap Capos and Noriel featuring Bryant Myers)	2018	—	—	—	—	—	—	—		Trap Capos II
"El Clavo"	2018	—	13	—	—	—	—	31	RIAA: 12× Platinum (Latin); AMPROFON: 4× Platinum	Alter Ego
"El Clavo" (Remix) (Duet with Maluma)	2018	—	—	—	—	26	—	—		Alter Ego
"90 Minutos (Fútbol Mode)" (featuring ChocQuibTown)	2018	—	—	—	—	—	—	—		Non-album single
"Llegaste Tú" (with CNCO)	2018	—	26	—	—	21	40	—	RIAA: 5× Platinum (Latin); AMPROFON: Gold	Non-album single
"Adicto" (with Marc Anthony)	2018	—	33	1	—	—	—	—	RIAA: 5× Platinum (Latin)	Alter Ego
"Rosa" (with Anitta)	2019	—	—	—	—	—	—	—		Kisses
"Cúrame" (with Manuel Turizo)	2019	—	31	—	—	40	—	70	RIAA: 4× Platinum (Latin)	Alter Ego
"Morir Solo"	2019	—	35	1	—	—	—	—	RIAA: 3× Platinum (Latin)	Alter Ego
"Trampa" (with Zion & Lennox)	2019	—	—	—	—	—	—	—		Alter Ego
"Dec. 21"	2019	—	—	—	—	—	—	—		Alter Ego
"Cita"	2020	—	—	—	—	—	—	—		Alter Ego
"Carita de Inocente" (solo or remix with Myke Towers)	2020	—	15	1	—	—	—	4	RIAA: 4× Platinum (Latin)	Alter Ego
"Luna Negra"	2020	—	—	—	—	—	—	—		Alter Ego
"Ayer Me Llamó Mi Ex (Remix)" (with Khea and Natti Natasha featuring Lenny Santos)	2020	—	33	5	—	5	—	—		Non-album single
"Antes Que Salga el Sol" (with Natti Natasha)	2021	—	27	—	—	59	43	86	RIAA: Platinum (Latin)	Nattividad
"Doctor" (with JonTheProducer, Mau y Ricky and Piso 21)	2021	—	—	—	—	—	—	—		Non-album singles
"Lao' a Lao'"	2021	—	23	1	1	—	—	—	RIAA: Platinum (Latin)	Llamada Perdida
Veterana (with Elvis Martínez)	2021	—	—	7	1	—	—	—	RIAA: Gold (Latin)	Mi Muchachita
"After Party" (with Alex Sensation, Farruko featuring Mariah Angeliq and Kevin Lyttle)	2022	—	—	—	—	—	—	—		Non-album singles
"Te Espero" (with María Becerra)	2022	—	26	1	1	33	49	—	RIAA: 2× Platinum (Latin)	Llamada Perdida
"Si Te Preguntan..." (with Nicky Jam & Jay Wheeler)	2022	—	31	2	1	—	—	96	RIAA: 3× Platinum (Latin)	Llamada Perdida
"Otra Vez"	2022	—	—	6	2	—	—	—	RIAA: Gold (Latin)	Llamada Perdida
"Le Doy 20 Mil" (with El Alfa)	2023	—	—	—	2	—	—	—		Llamada Perdida
"Me EnRD"	2023	—	—	1	4	—	—	—		Llamada Perdida
"Cosas de la Peda" (featuring Gabito Ballesteros)	2024	—	46	1	1	—	—	—		Llamada Perdida
"Morfina" (featuring Paloma Mami)	2024	—	—	—	—	—	—	—		Llamada Perdida
"Calumnia" (with Carlos Rivera)	2024	—	—	—	—	—	—	—		TBA
"Anestesiada" (featuring Luis Miguel del Amargue)	2024	—	—	—	—	—	—	—		Llamada Perdida
"El Reemplazo" (with DJ Adoni and Darell)	2024	—	—	—	—	—	—	—		Non-album singles
"Estocolmo" (with Romeo Santos)	2025	—	13	14	—	—	—	—		Better Late Than Never
"Lokita Por Mí" (with Romeo Santos)	2026	—	11	1	1	—	—	22		Better Late Than Never
"Dardos" (with Romeo Santos)	2026	—	8	1	2	—	—	1		Better Late Than Never
"Ay! San Miguel" (with Romeo Santos)	2026	—	20	1	—	—	—	—		Better Late Than Never
"Menor" (with Romeo Santos and Dalvin La Melodía)	2026	—	—	—	—	—	—	—		
"—" denotes a title that did not chart, or was not released in that territory.

==== English-language ====
List of English singles as a lead artist, with selected chart positions, showing year released and album name
Title	Year	Peak chart positions			Certifications	Album
Title	Year	US	AUS	CAN	Certifications	Album
"Addicted"	2011	—	—	—		Phase II
"Stuck on a Feeling" (featuring Snoop Dogg)	2014	43	34	46	RIAA: Gold	Double Vision
"Back It Up" (featuring Pitbull)	2015	92	—	56	RIAA: Gold; PROMUSICAE: Gold; ZPAV: Gold	Double Vision
"Nobody But Me" (with Sofía Reyes)	2016	—	—	—	RIAA: Gold	Non-album singles
"Hands" (with various artists)	2016	—	—	—		Non-album singles
"—" denotes a title that did not chart, or was not released in that territory.

=== As featured artist ===
List of singles as featured artist, with selected chart positions and certifications, showing year released and album name
Title	Year	Peak chart positions							Certifications	Album
Title	Year	US Latin	US Latin Pop	US Trop	Dom Rep	ARG	BRA	MEX	Certifications	Album
"Ven Conmigo" (Daddy Yankee featuring Prince Royce)	2011	9	—	2	—	—	—	23		Prestige
"El Verdadero Amor Perdona" (Bachata version) (Maná featuring Prince Royce)	2011	1	—	1	—	—	—	1		Drama y Luz (Deluxe Edition)
"Te Perdiste Mi Amor" (Thalía featuring Prince Royce)	2013	4	—	7	—	—	—	1	AMPROFON: 3× Platinum+Gold	Habítame Siempre
"Te Dar um Beijo" (Michel Teló featuring Prince Royce)	2014	—	—	—	—	—	5	—		Non-album single
"Gris" (India Martínez featuring Prince Royce)	2017	—	—	—	—	—	—	—		Te Cuento un Secreto
"Quiero Saber" (Pitbull featuring Prince Royce and Ludacris)	2018	—	—	—	—	—	—	—		Non-album singles
"Bubalú" (DJ Luian & Mambo Kingz featuring Anuel AA, Becky G and Prince Royce)	2018	22	—	—	7	74	—	— (Note: "Bubalu" did not chart on the Billboard Mexico Airplay chart, though did peak at number 38 on the Mexico Espanol Airplay chart.)	RIAA: 11× Platinum (Latin); PROMUSICAE: Platinum	Non-album singles
"Tell Me Again" (Pitbull featuring Prince Royce and Ludacris)	2020	—	—	—	—	—	—	—		Libertad 548

== Guest appearances ==
List of guest appearances, showing year of release, artist(s) and originating album
Title	Year	Artist(s)	Album
"El Campo de los Sueños" (Opening song for ESPN's Domingo de Grandes Ligas)	2010	Sergio George	None
"No One Compares"	2013	Jessica Sánchez	Me, You & the Music
"Dangerous Ground"	2014	Sean Paul	Full Frequency
"My Angel"	2015	Himself	Furious 7
"Tu Libertad"	2015	Wisin	Los Vaqueros: La Trilogía
"Hangover"	2018	Maluma	F.A.M.E.
"Don't You Worry 'bout a Thing"	2018	Arturo Sandoval	Ultimate Duets
"Visa Para un Sueño"	2018	Himself	Más de un Siglo
"Sunflower" (Remix)	2018	Post Malone, Swae Lee, Nicky Jam	Spider-Man Into the Spider-Verse
"Un Ladron"	2022	Wisin & Yandel	La Ultima Mision
"Vibrate"	2023	Pitbull	None

== Music videos ==
List of music videos, showing year released and director
Title	Year	Director(s)
"Corazón Sin Cara"	2009	Danny Hastings
"Stand by Me"	2010	Danny Hastings
"Stand by Me" (New version)	2010	Pablo Croce
"El Campo de los Sueños" (Sergio George featuring Prince Royce)	2010	Unknown
"Corazón Sin Cara" (New version)	2010	Danny Hastings
"El Amor Que Perdimos"	2011	Pablo Croce
"Ven Conmigo" (Daddy Yankee featuring Prince Royce)	2011	Carlos Pérez
"El Verdadero Amor Perdona" (Maná featuring Prince Royce)	2011	Pablo Croce
"Addicted"	2011	Jack Macaluso
"Las Cosas Pequeñas"	2012	Carlos Pérez
"Incondicional"	2012	Pablo Croce
"Te Perdiste Mi Amor" (Thalía featuring Prince Royce)	2013	Bruce Gowers
"Darte un Beso" (Lyric video)	2013	Alfredo Ibarra
"Darte un Beso"	2013	Danny Hastings
"Te Robaré"	2014	Benny Boom
"Nada"	2014	Jon J
"Soy el Mismo"	2014	Carlos Pérez
"Te Dar um Beijo" (Michel Teló featuring Prince Royce)	2014	Fernando Hiro; Jacques Junior
"Soy el Mismo (Duet Version)" (Duet with Roberto Tapia)	2014	Carlos Pérez
"Stuck on a Feeling" (Lyric video) (featuring Snoop Dogg)	2014	Unknown
"Stuck on a Feeling" (featuring Snoop Dogg)	2014	Colin Tilley
"My Angel"	2015	Colin Tilley
"Back It Up" (Lyric video) (featuring Pitbull)	2015	Unknown
"Back It Up (Spanish Version)" (Lyric video) (featuring Jennifer Lopez and Pitbull)	2015	Unknown
"Back It Up (Album Version)" (featuring Jennifer Lopez and Pitbull)	2015	Colin Tilley
"Extraordinary"	2015	Jon J
"Tu Libertad" (Wisin featuring Prince Royce)	2015	Jessy Terrero
"Culpa al Corazón"	2016	Jessy Terrero
"Solo Yo" (with Sofía Reyes)	2016	Dan Packer
"Nobody But Me" (with Sofía Reyes)	2016	Dan Packer
"La Carretera"	2016	Jon J
"Hands" (Lyric video) (with various artists)	2016	Christiana Divona; Lexi Opper; Spencer Moya
"Moneda" (featuring Gerardo Ortiz)	2016	Jessy Terrero
"Gris" (India Martínez featuring Prince Royce)	2017	Alberto Utrera; Nuño Benito
"Déjà Vu" (with Shakira)	2017	Jaume de Laiguana
"Ganas Locas" (featuring Farruko)	2017	Jessy Terrero
"100 Años" (with Ha*Ash)	2017	Pablo Croce
"Just As I Am" (SpiffTV featuring Prince Royce and Chris Brown)	2017	Spiff TV; Rob Dade
"Sensualidad" (with DJ Luian, Mambo Kingz, Bad Bunny and J Balvin)	2017	Fernando Lugo
"No Love" (with Trap Capos and Noriel featuring Bryant Myers)	2018	Fernando Lugo
"El Clavo"	2018	Carlos Pérez
"El Clavo" (Remix)" (Duet with Maluma)	2018	Carlos Pérez
"90 Minutos (Fútbol Mode)" (featuring ChocQuibTown)	2018	Mike Ho
"Don't You Worry 'bout a Thing" (with Arturo Sandoval)	2018	Unknown
"Llegaste Tú" (with CNCO)	2018	JP Valencia - Harold
"Bubalú" (DJ Luian & Mambo Kingz featuring Anuel AA, Becky G and Prince Royce)	2018	Eif Rivera
"Quiero Saber" (Pitbull featuring Prince Royce and Ludacris)	2018	Gil Green
"Visa Para un Sueño" (part of Banco Popular's Más de un Siglo TV special)	2018	Arí Manuel Cruz
"Adicto" (with Marc Anthony)	2018	Jessy Terrero
"Cúrame" (with Manuel Turizo)	2019	JP Valencia
"Rosa" (with Anitta)	2019	Bruno Ilogti
"Morir Solo"	2019	Fernando Lugo
"Trampa" (with Zion & Lennox)	2019	Fernando Lugo
"Dec. 21"	2019	Fernando Lugo
"Cita"	2020	Carlos Pérez
"Carita de Inocente"	2020	Unknown
"Luna Negra"	2020	Carlos Pérez
"Tell Me Again" (Pitbull featuring Prince Royce and Ludacris)	2020	Gil Green
"Una Aventura" (featuring Wisin & Yandel)	2020	Unknown
