= Number 1's (Prince Royce album) =

#1's

Compilation album by Prince Royce
- Released: November 19, 2012
- Recorded: 2010–2012
- Genres: Latin pop; bachata; R&B
- Length: 59:23
- Label: Top Stop Music

Prince Royce chronology
Phase II (2012)	#1's (2012)	Soy el Mismo (2013)

Professional ratings
Review scores
Source	Rating
Allmusic	4/5 stars

#1's is the first compilation album by American singer Prince Royce; it was released on November 19, 2012, by Top Stop Music. The album, mostly a collection of Royce's hits thus far, contains tracks from his first two studio albums, Prince Royce (2010) and Phase II (2012).

The release debuted and peaked at number three on the Billboard Top Latin Albums chart in the United States. Among the tracks included on the album are the US Latin and Tropical songs charts hit singles "Stand by Me", "Corazón Sin Cara", "Las Cosas Pequeñas", "Incondicional", and "Te Me Vas". #1's was eventually certified Platinum (Latin field) by Recording Industry Association of America (RIAA) in the US for certified units of at least 60,000. The album was later nominated for Tropical Album of the Year at the 2014 Latin Billboard Music Awards.

== Review ==
David Jeffries of AllMusic gave the album 4 out of 5 stars saying, "With only two albums under his belt as of 2012, a year-end Prince Royce compilation might seem a bit premature, but the singer's mix of urban, bachata, and Latin pop flavours had him topping Billboard magazine's Year End Issue's Latin Charts for the second year in a row, so consider this a celebration. Those who passed on his first two full-lengths can consider it a catch-up too as #1's checks off the biggest singles from both his 2010 self-titled debut and its 2012 follow-up Phase II. With his remake of Ben E. King's "Stand by Me," his bachata blockbuster "Corazón Sin Cara," and his plush, romantic favourite "Las Cosas Pequeñas," all on the track list, the usual suspects are accounted for, while collaborative tracks with rock band Mana ("El Verdadero Amor Perdona") and salsa singer Luis Enrique ("Sabes") round out the collection well with some desirable, off-album selections. Strange that "El Amor Que Perdimos" is here, since the track "stalled" on Billboard's Latin charts somewhere in the teens, but forgive the oversight and this—mostly—chart-topping collection offers a convenient, hit-filled overview of the superstar's early work."

== Track listing ==
No.	Title	Writer(s)	Producer(s)	Length
1.	"Corazón Sin Cara"	Geoffrey Rojas	Hidalgo; George; Royce^{[a]}; Lora^{[a]}	3:31
2.	"Stand By Me"	Ben E. King; Mike Stoller; Jerry Leiber	Andrés Hidalgo; Sergio George; Prince Royce^{[a]}; D'Lesly Lora^{[a]}	3:25
3.	"Te Me Vas"	Guainko Webster Batista Fernandez de Gomez, Efrain Davila, Rojas		3:18
4.	"Las Cosas Pequeñas"	George, Rojas		3:35
5.	"Recházame"	Rojas	Hidalgo; Royce^{[a]}; Lora^{[a]}	3:43
6.	"El Verdadero Amor Perdona (Bachata Version)" (Maná featuring Prince Royce)	Fher Olvera		3:57
7.	"Incondicional"	Daniel Santacruz, Geoffrey Rojas, Sergio George		3:27
8.	"Addicted"	Erik Nelson, Nasri Atweh, Jessica Castellanos, Emile Ghantous		3:55
9.	"Mi Última Carta"	Rojas	Hidalgo; Royce^{[a]}; Lora^{[a]}	4:04
10.	"Tú y Yo"	Rojas; Hidalgo	Hidalgo; George; Royce^{[a]}; Lora^{[a]}	4:06
11.	"El Amor Que Perdimos"	Rojas; Hidalgo	Hidalgo; Royce^{[a]}; Lora^{[a]}	4:05
12.	"Sabes" (Luis Enrique featuring Prince Royce)	Luis Enrique; Jorge Luís Piloto		4:09
13.	"Corazón Sin Cara" (Sing-Along Version)	Geoffrey Rojas	Hidalgo; George; Royce^{[a]}; Lora^{[a]}	3:31
14.	"Stand By Me" (Sing-Along Version)	Ben E. King; Mike Stoller; Jerry Leiber	Andrés Hidalgo; Sergio George; Prince Royce^{[a]}; D'Lesly Lora^{[a]}	3:25
15.	"Las Cosas Pequeñas" (Sing-Along Version)	George, Rojas		3:35
16.	"Incondicional" (Sing-Along Version)	Daniel Santacruz, Geoffrey Rojas, Sergio George		3:27
Total length:				59:23

== Charts ==
=== Weekly charts ===
Chart (2012–2013)	Peak position
US Top Latin Albums (Billboard)	3
US Tropical Albums (Billboard)	1

=== Year-end charts ===
Chart (2013)	Position
US Top Latin Albums (Billboard)	9
Chart (2014)	Position
US Top Latin Albums (Billboard)	20
Chart (2017)	Position
US Top Latin Albums (Billboard)	29
Chart (2018)	Position
US Top Latin Albums (Billboard)	32
Chart (2021)	Position
US Top Latin Albums (Billboard)	90

== Certifications ==
Region	Certification	Certified units/sales
United States (RIAA)	Platinum (Latin)	60,000^{^}
^{^} Shipments figures based on certification alone.
