= Michel Teló discography =

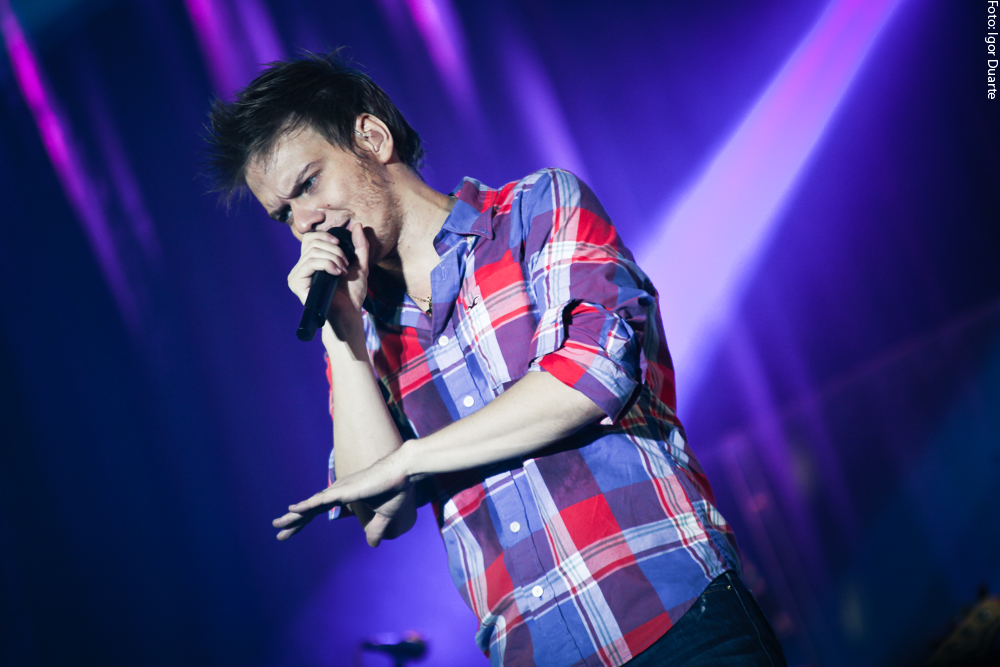
- Studio albums: 1
- Live albums: 2
- Singles: 6
- Video albums: 1
- Music videos: 3

The discography of Michel Teló, a Brazilian country music recording artist, consists of one studio albums, two live albums, eight singles, one video albums, and nine music videos.

== Albums ==
=== Studio albums ===
| Title | Album Details |
|---|---|
| Balada Sertaneja | Released: September 19, 2009; Label: Som Livre; Formats: CD, Digital download |
| Pra Ouvir No Fone | Released: December 4, 2020; Label: Som Livre |

=== Live albums ===
| Title | Album Details | Peak chart positions | | | | | | | | | Certifications |
| Title | Album Details | BRA | AUT | FRA | GER | ITA | NL | SPA | SWI | US World | Certifications |
|---|---|---|---|---|---|---|---|---|---|---|---|
| Michel Teló - Ao Vivo | Released: August 14, 2010; Label: Som Livre; Formats: CD, digital download | — | — | — | — | — | — | — | — | — | Sales: 100,000; BRA: Gold |
| Na Balada | Released: December 18, 2011; Label: Som Livre; Formats: CD, digital download | 2 | 10 | 4 | 11 | 53 | 13 | 10 | 2 | 6 | Sales: 250,000; BRA: Platinum; POR: Platinum |
| Sunset | Released: May 21, 2013; Label: Som Livre; Formats: CD, digital download | 7 | — | — | — | — | — | — | — | — | |
| Rolê Aleatório | Released: November 24, 2023; Label: Brothers | | | | | | | | | | |

== Singles ==
=== International singles ===
| Year | Title | Peak chart positions | | | | | | | | | | Certifications | Album |
| Year | Title | BRA | AUT | FRA | GER | ITA | NL | SPA | SWI | UK | US | Certifications | Album |
|---|---|---|---|---|---|---|---|---|---|---|---|---|---|
| 2011 | "Ai Se Eu Te Pego" | 1 | 1 | 1 | 1 | 1 | 1 | 1 | 1 | 66 | 81 | ESP: 4× Platinum; ITA: 3× Platinum; MC: Platinum | Na Balada |
| 2012 | "Bara Bara" | — | 45 | — | 42 | — | 60 | 48 | — | — | — | | Na Balada |
"—" denotes a title that did not chart or was not released in that territory.

Featured in

| Year | Title | Peak chart positions | | | Album |
| Year | Title | MEX | US Latin | US Latin Pop | Album |
|---|---|---|---|---|---|
| 2013 | "Como Le Gusta a Tu Cuerpo" (Carlos Vives feat. Michel Teló) | 7 | 3 | 2 | Corazón Profundo |

=== Brazilian singles ===
| Year | Single | Album | Notes |
|---|---|---|---|
| 2009 | "Ei, Psiu! Beijo Me Liga" | Balada Sertaneja | |
| 2010 | "Amanhã Sei Lá" | Balada Sertaneja | |
| 2010 | "Fugidinha" | Michel Teló - Ao Vivo | |
| 2011 | "Se Intrometeu" | Non-album single | |
| 2011 | "Larga de Bobeira" | Michel Teló - Ao Vivo | |
| 2011 | "Ai Se Eu Te Pego!" | Na Balada | See above for international positions |
| 2011 | "Humilde Residência" | Na Balada | |
| 2011 | "Eu Te Amo e Open Bar" | Na Balada | |
| 2012 | "Bara Bara" | Non-album song | See above for international positions |
| 2012 | "É Nóis Faze Parapapá" (with Sorriso Maroto) | Sunset | |
| 2012 | "Love Song" | Sunset | |
| 2013 | "Amiga da Minha Irmã" | Sunset | |
| 2013 | "Maria" | Sunset | |
| 2013 | "Se Tudo Fosse Fácil" (feat. Paula Fernandes) | Sunset | |
| 2013 | "Levemente Alterado" (feat. Brunino & Davi) | Sunset | |
| 2014 | "Te Dar Um Beijo" (feat. Prince Royce) | Non-album song | |
| 2014 | "Talento" (with Claudia Leitte) | Non-album song | |

Featured in

| Year | Single | Album | Notes |
|---|---|---|---|
| 2010 | "Alô" (Léo & Junior / Michel Teló) | Fora do Normal - Ao Vivo | |
| 2011 | "Vamo Mexê" (Bruninho & Davi feat. Michel Teló) | Proibido para Menores | |
| 2011 | "Desce do Salto" (Marcos & Belutti & Michel Teló) | Sem Me Controlar - Ao Vivo | |
| 2012 | "Se Quer a Verdade" (Dáblio Moreira feat. Michel Teló) | Se Quer a Verdade | |
| 2012 | "Vai Rolar" (Victor & Matheus feat. Michel Teló) | | |
| 2012 | "Ciuminho" (Kleo Dibah & Rafael feat. Michel Teló) | | |
| 2013 | "Como Le Gusta a Tu Cuerpo" (Carlos Vives feat. Michel Teló) | Corazón Profundo | See above for international positions |

=== Telenovela Theme songs ===
| Year | Theme | Telenovela / Album |
|---|---|---|
| 2010 | "Fugidinha" | Malhação |
| 2011 | "Ai Se Eu Te Pego" | Fina Estampa |
| 2012 | "Humilde Residência" | Avenida Brasil |
| 2012 | "É Nóis Fazê Parapapá" (feat. Sorriso Maroto) | Salve Jorge |
