= Soy el Mismo =

Soy el Mismo (English: I am the Same) may refer to:

- Soy el Mismo (Eddie Santiago album) or the title song, 1991
- Soy el Mismo (Prince Royce album), 2013
  - "Soy el Mismo" (song), the title song
