= Phase II (album) =

Studio album by Prince Royce
- Released: April 10, 2012
- Recorded: 2011–12
- Genres: Latin pop; bachata; R&B
- Length: 46:30
- Label: Top Stop Music
- Producers: Sergio George (also exec.); George Elías (exec.); Prince Royce; The Messengers; The Insomniax; soFly and Nius; Dakari

Prince Royce chronology
Prince Royce (2010)	Phase II (2012)	#1's (2012)

Singles from Phase II
- 1. "Las Cosas Pequeñas" Released: January 11, 2012; 2. "Incondicional" Released: June 12, 2012; 3. "Te Me Vas" Released: December 3, 2012

Phase II is the second studio album by American singer Prince Royce; it was released on April 10, 2012, by Top Stop Music. The 12-track album (with two acoustic bonus tracks) saw Royce incorporate a variety of music styles to his work, including bachata, Latin pop, R&B and mariachi. Phase II contains songs in both English and Spanish, with melodies atypical to traditional bachata music, which had been regarded as Royce's main music genre since the release of his eponymous debut studio album in 2010.

Three singles were released to promote the album in 2012. In the United States, the album's lead single, "Las Cosas Pequeñas" debuted at number one on the Billboard Tropical Songs chart, and eventually also reached number one on the Billboard Hot Latin Songs chart. The album's second and third singles, "Incondicional" and "Te Me Vas", both peaked at number two on the US Hot Latin Songs chart.

Phase II was certified Platinum (Latin field) in the US by the Recording Industry Association of America (RIAA) just six months after its release. It was later nominated for Best Tropical Fusion Album at the Latin Grammy Awards of 2012, Royce's third Latin Grammy nomination. Also this album received 2 nominated in the 2013 as Latin Billboard Music Awards Latin Album of the Year and Digital Album of the Year, but both lost to Romeo Santos' Formula, Vol. 1

== Track listing ==
No.	Title	Writer(s)	Length
1.	"Prelude" (featuring La Bruja)	Caridad De La Luz	1:25
2.	"Incondicional"	Daniel Santacruz, Geoffrey Rojas, Sergio George	3:27
3.	"Las Cosas Pequeñas" (Bachata Version)	George, Rojas	3:35
4.	"Addicted"	Erik Nelson, Nasri Atweh, Jessica Castellanos, Emile Ghantous	3:55
5.	"Eres Tú"	Rojas, Jorge Luis Chacin, Guianko Gomez	3:12
6.	"Memorias"	Rojas, George	3:33
7.	"Hecha Para Mí"	Gomez, Rojas	3:37
8.	"Close to You"	George, Rojas, Gomez, Atweh	4:11
9.	"Dulce" (Bachata Version)	George, Rojas	4:04
10.	"Mi Habitación"	George, Rojas, Jose Duran	4:11
11.	"It's My Time"	Gomez, Dakari, Rojas	3:55
12.	"Te Me Vas"	Guainko Webster Batista Fernandez de Gomez, Efrain Davila, Rojas	3:18
13.	"Dulce" (Acoustic Version) (featuring Arthur Hanlon)	George, Rojas	3:47

Bonus Track
No.	Title	Writer(s)	Length
14.	"Las Cosas Pequeñas" (Acoustic Version)	George, Rojas	3:40

Bonus Tracks: Tracks From The Debut Album
No.	Title	Writer(s)	Producer(s)	Length
14.	"Stand By Me"	Ben E. King, Mike Stoller, Jerry Leiber	Andrés Hidalgo, Sergio George	3:25
15.	"Corazón Sin Cara"	Geoffrey Rojas	Hidalgo, George	3:31
16.	"El Amor Que Perdimos"	Rojas, Hidalgo	Hidalgo	4:05

The deluxe edition included the CD containing the first 13 tracks from the album and an exclusive bonus DVD featuring 6 live performances, 2 music videos and up-close interviews (in English & Spanish).

Deluxe Edition - CD & DVD
No.	Title	Length
1.	"Las Cosas Pequeñas (Live)"
2.	"Te Me Vas (Live)"
3.	"Incondicional (Live)"
4.	"Addicted (Live)"
5.	"Lindas Memorias (Live)"
6.	"Mi Habitacíon (Live)"
7.	"Interview (Spanish)"
8.	"Interview (English)"
9.	"Addicted (Music Video)"
10.	"Las Cosas Pequeñas (Music Video)"

== Personnel ==
- Bongos - Adan Gomez
- Mezcla - Alfredo Matheus
- Composer - Caridad De La Luz
- Bongos - Christopher Mercedes
- Arreglos, Piano - D'Lesly "Dice" Lora
- Composer - Dakari
- Vihuela - Daniel Garcia
- Composer - Daniel Santacruz
- Congas - Dennys "Papacho" Savon
- Composer - Efrain Davilla
- Composer - Emile Ghantous
- Composer - Erik Nelson
- Composer, Coros - Geoffrey Royce Rojas
- A&R, Production Coordination - Georgette "Gigi" Carolini
- Composer - Guainko Gomez
- Composer, Coros - Guianko Gomez
- Composer - Jessica Castellanos
- Composer - Jose Luis "Caplis" Chacin
- Vihuela - Juan Arauza
- Featured Artist - La Bruja
- Coros - Lee Levin
- Director, Primary Artist - Mariachi Mexico Internacional Si Senor Trompeta
- Vihuela - Michael Guillen
- Estilista - Michelle Ten
- Composer - Nasri Atweh
- Vihuela - Orlando Forte
- Primary Artist - Prince Royce
- Guira - Raul Bier
- Congas - Robert Quintero
- Congas - Robert Vilera
- Violin - Ronald Campo
- Arreglos, Composer, Piano - Sergio George

== Charts ==
=== Weekly charts ===
Chart (2012)	Peak position
US Billboard 200	16
US Top Latin Albums (Billboard)	1
US Tropical Albums (Billboard)	1

=== Year-end charts ===
Chart (2012)	Position
US Top Latin Albums (Billboard)	2
US Tropical Albums (Billboard)	2

Chart (2013)	Position
US Top Latin Albums (Billboard)	30

== Sales and certifications ==
Region	Certification	Certified units/sales
United States (RIAA)	Platinum (Latin)	100,000^{^}
^{^} Shipments figures based on certification alone.

== See also ==
- List of number-one Billboard Latin Albums from the 2010s
