= Addicted (Prince Royce song) =

Single by Prince Royce

from the album Phase II
- Released: September 19, 2011
- Genre: R&B; Pop
- Length: 3:55
- Label: Top Stop Music & Atlantic Records
- Songwriters: Erik Nelson; Nasri Atweh; Jessica Castellanos; Emile Ghantous

Prince Royce singles chronology
| "Mi Última Carta" (2011) | "Addicted" (2011) | "El Verdadero Amor Perdona" (2011) |

Music video
- "Addicted" on YouTube

"Addicted" is a song by American singer Prince Royce from his second studio album, Phase II (2011). It was released by Atlantic Records on September 19, 2011. It is Royce's first English single.

== Background ==
While the song is part of Royce's second album, it was not considered nor promoted as a single for Phase II. The song was released in 2011 but the song "Las Cosas Pequeñas", which was released in 2012, became the album's first single instead. When Addicted was released, it was promoted as a single for an English Pop album that Royce had planned to release in 2012. However, he ended up adding it to his second album, which was mostly a Spanish Bachata album, and didn't release his English album until 2015 with Double Vision in which the song was not included in.

== Music video ==
The music video was released on October 5, 2011. In the video, Royce is seen singing at the studio while also showing him at the beach and sitting in front of a tree using his tablet or writing a song.
