= List of number-one Billboard Tropical Songs of 2013 =

The Billboard Tropical Airplay chart ranks the best-performing tropical songs of the United States. Published by Billboard magazine, the data are compiled by Nielsen Broadcast Data Systems based collectively on each single's weekly airplay.

== Chart history ==
Issue date	Song	Artist	Ref
January 5	"¿Por Qué Les Mientes?"	Tito El Bambino + El Patrón; Featuring Marc Anthony	
January 12	"¿Por Qué Les Mientes?"	Tito El Bambino + El Patrón; Featuring Marc Anthony	
January 19	"¿Por Qué Les Mientes?"	Tito El Bambino + El Patrón; Featuring Marc Anthony	
January 26	"Que seas feliz"	Tito Nieves	
February 2	"Déjame cambiarte la vida"	Charlie Cruz	
February 9	"Infiel"	Karlos Rosé	
February 16	"Regálame un muack"	Chino & Nacho	
February 26	"Infiel"	Karlos Rose	
March 2	"Te Me Vas"	Prince Royce	
March 9	"Day 1"	Leslie Grace	
March 16	"Te Me Vas"	Prince Royce	
March 23	"Me llamaré tuyo"	Víctor Manuelle	
March 30	"Te Me Vas"	Prince Royce	
April 6	"Te Me Vas"	Prince Royce	
April 13	"Todo mi amor eres tú"	Toby Love	
April 20	"Me gustas muchísimo"	N'Klabe + Yomo	
April 27	"Descontrólame"	Luis Enrique	
May 4	"My way"	Henry Santos	
May 11	"Llévame contigo"	Romeo Santos	
May 18	"Llévame contigo"	Romeo Santos	
May 25	"Llévame contigo"	Romeo Santos	
June 1	"Vivir mi vida"	Marc Anthony	
June 8	"Vivir mi vida"	Marc Anthony	
June 15	"Vivir mi vida"	Marc Anthony	
June 22	"Vivir mi vida"	Marc Anthony	
June 29	"Vivir mi vida"	Marc Anthony	
July 6	"Vivir mi vida"	Marc Anthony	
July 13	"Vivir mi vida"	Marc Anthony	
July 20	"Vivir mi vida"	Marc Anthony	
July 27	"Vivir mi vida"	Marc Anthony	
August 3	"Vivir mi vida"	Marc Anthony	
August 10	"Vivir mi vida"	Marc Anthony	
August 17	"Darte un beso"	Prince Royce	
August 24	"Darte un beso"	Prince Royce	
August 31	"Darte un beso"	Prince Royce	
September 7	"Darte un beso"	Prince Royce	
September 14	"Darte un beso"	Prince Royce	
September 21	"Darte un beso"	Prince Royce	
September 28	"Darte un beso"	Prince Royce	
October 5	"Propuesta indecente"	Romeo Santos	
October 12	"Propuesta indecente"	Romeo Santos	
October 19	"Propuesta indecente"	Romeo Santos	
October 26	"Propuesta indecente"	Romeo Santos	
November 2	"Carnaval"	Tito el Bambino	
November 9	"Propuesta indecente"	Romeo Santos	
November 16	"Propuesta indecente"	Romeo Santos	
November 23	"Propuesta indecente"	Romeo Santos	
November 30	"Propuesta indecente"	Romeo Santos	
December 7	"Propuesta indecente"	Romeo Santos	
December 14	"Propuesta indecente"	Romeo Santos	
December 21	"Propuesta indecente"	Romeo Santos	
December 28	"Propuesta indecente"	Romeo Santos	

== See also ==
- List of number-one Billboard Top Latin Songs of 2013
