= Te Robaré =

Te Robaré may refer to:

- "Te Robaré" (Prince Royce song), 2013
- "Te Robaré" (Nicky Jam song), 2019
