= Leslie Grace (album) =

Studio album by Leslie Grace
- Released: June 25, 2013
- Genre: Bachata; tropical; pop
- Language: Spanish
- Label: Top Stop
- Producer: Sergio George

Leslie Grace chronology
Pasión (2009)	Leslie Grace (2013)	Lloviendo Estrellas (2015)

Singles from Leslie Grace
- 1. "Will You Still Love Me Tomorrow" Released: July 17, 2012; 2. "Day 1" Released: November 19, 2012; 3. "Be My Baby" Released: May 14, 2013; 4. "Odio No Odiarte" Released: October 21, 2013

Leslie Grace is the self-titled second studio album and first tropical album by American singer Leslie Grace. The album was released on June 25, 2013, by Top Stop Music. It debuted at number four on the Billboard Latin Albums chart, and number three on the Billboard Tropical Albums chart. A deluxe edition of the album was released on July 4, 2013.

== Album information ==
Leslie Grace is Grace's first album since Pasión in 2009. It is the first album to be produced by Sergio George and released under his independent record label, Top Stop Music. It is George's first time working with a female bachata artist. The lead single, produced by George, "Will You Still Love Me Tomorrow", a bilingual, bachata cover of the 1961 The Shirelles hit, co-written by Carole King. Her version peaked number one on both the Billboard Tropical Songs chart and Billboard Latin Airplay charts, becoming the first female Latin artist to do so.

== Track listing ==
No.	Title	Writer(s)	Length
1.	"Will You Still Love Me Tomorrow" (Bachata Version)	Gerry Geroff; Carole King	3:13
2.	"Day 1"	Leslie Grace; Israel Mercedes aka Rey King; Jason Rivera	3:12
3.	"Be My Baby"	Jeff Barry; Ellie Greenwich; Phil Spector	3:38
4.	"Adios Corazón"	Diane Warren	3:32
5.	"Odio No Odiarte"	Grace; Jason Rivera	3:48
6.	"No Me Arrepiento"	Jason Rivera	3:16
7.	"A Mi Manera"	Sergio George; Chris Hierro	4:03
8.	"Take Me Away"	Grace; Israel Mercedes aka Rey King	3:55
9.	"No Te Rindas"	Grace; Santacruz	4:06
10.	"Hoy"	Grace; Israel Mercedes aka Rey King	3:41
11.	"Will You Still Love Me Tomorrow" (Dance Version)	Gerry Goffin; Carole King	4:22
Total length:			40:45

Deluxe Edition Bonus Track
No.	Title	Writer(s)	Length
12.	"Peligroso Amor"	Gogo Muñoz	4:00
Total length:			44:45

== Awards and recognitions ==
- The 2013 album was nominated for a Latin Grammy for Best Tropical Album. Grace was the only female artist to be nominated in this category.
- The album's third single "Be My Baby" was nominated for Song of the Year at the Premios Juventud awards.
- The album's success saw Grace receive a nomination at the Premio Lo Nuestro awards for the Female Tropical Artist of the Year.

== Charts ==
=== Weekly charts ===
Chart (2013)	Peak position
US Top Latin Albums (Billboard)	3
US Tropical Albums (Billboard)	2

=== Year-end charts ===
Chart (2013)	Position
US Top Latin Albums (Billboard)	60
US Tropical Albums (Billboard)	11
Chart (2014)	Position
US Tropical Albums (Billboard)	15
