= Day 1 (song) =

Single by Leslie Grace

from the album Leslie Grace
- Released: November 19, 2012
- Genre: Bachata
- Length: 3:11
- Label: Top Stop
- Songwriters: Leslie Grace; Israel Mercedes; Jason Rivera

Leslie Grace singles chronology
"Will You Still Love Me Tomorrow" (2012)	"Day 1" (2012)	"Be My Baby" (2013)

"Day 1" ("Dia 1") is a song recorded by American singer Leslie Grace. This is her second single from her album Leslie Grace 2013, which was released by Top Stop Music on November 19, 2012. The music video was released early February 2013. In a studio, Leslie is singing into the camera modeling. The video ends with Leslie close up to the camera saying "You've had me from day one." It was recognized as among the most successful tropical songs by ASCAP in 2014. To version of this song. A mostly Spanish version and another version with more English in to the lyrics.

== Charts ==
=== Weekly charts ===
Chart (2013)	Peak position
US Hot Latin Songs (Billboard)	21
US Latin Airplay (Billboard)	22
US Tropical Airplay (Billboard)	1

=== Year-end charts ===
Chart (2013)	Position
US Hot Latin Songs (Billboard)	89

== See also ==
- List of number-one Billboard Tropical Songs of 2013
