= Lloviendo Estrellas =

EP by Leslie Grace
- Released: June 23, 2015
- Genres: Bachata; tropical; pop
- Length: 26:51
- Language: Spanish
- Label: Sony Music Latin

Leslie Grace chronology
Leslie Grace (2013)	Lloviendo Estrellas (2015)

Singles from Lloviendo Estrellas
- 1. "Cómo Duele El Silencio" Released: 2015

Lloviendo Estrellas is the first extended play by Dominican-American singer Leslie Grace. It was released on June 23, 2015, under Sony Music Latin. It is the first production released under Sony after she left her previous label Top Stop Music. She mentioned in an interview that being with the current record label, it helped her promote this album more internationally. Its lead single, "Cómo Duele El Silencio", peaked #1 in the Billboard Tropical Airplay chart.

== Track listing ==
No.	Title	Writer(s)	Length
1.	"Cómo Duele El Silencio"	Edgar Barrera; Efraín Dávila; Guianko Gómez; Leslie Grace	3:52
2.	"Voy A Hacer Que Me Extrañes"	Efraín Dávila; Guianko Gómez; Leslie Grace	3:59
3.	"Si Hay Frío" (featuring Johnny Sky)	José Luis "Caplís" Chacín; Chris Hierro	4:06
4.	"Raining Stars"	Chris Hierro; Leslie Grace	3:40
5.	"No Te Lo Mereces"	Yoel Henríquez; Leslie Grace	3:35
6.	"Solita Me Voy"	Claudia Brant; Leslie Grace	3:49
7.	"Crazy Crazy"	Yoel Henríquez; Leslie Grace	3:51
Total length:			26:51

== Charts ==
Chart (2015)	Peak position
US Top Latin Albums (Billboard)	38
US Tropical Albums (Billboard)	6
