= List of number-one Billboard Tropical Songs of 2015 =

The Billboard Tropical Airplay chart ranks the best-performing tropical songs of the United States. Published by Billboard magazine, the data are compiled by Nielsen Broadcast Data Systems based collectively on each single's weekly airplay.

== Chart history ==
Issue date	Song	Artist	Ref
January 3	"Sentirte Mia"	Ken-Y	
January 10	"Que Suenen Los Tambores"	Víctor Manuelle	
January 17	"Que Suenen Los Tambores"	Víctor Manuelle	
January 24	"Pasarla Bien"	Ilegales featuring El Potro Alvarez	
January 31	"Que Suenen Los Tambores"	Víctor Manuelle	
February 7	"Tracion"	Yanfourd	
February 14	"Quiereme"	Johnny Sky	
February 21	"Son 45"	Ismael Miranda	
February 28	"Mal De Amor"	Sharlene featuring Servando & Florentino	
March 7	"Volver a Empezar"	Renzo	
March 14	"Tatuaje"	Elvis Crespo featuring Bachata Heightz	
March 21	"Solita"	Prince Royce	
March 28	"Noche Bohemia"	Jerry Rivera featuring Anthony Santos	
April 4	"Ruleta Rusa"	Tony Dize	
April 11	"Ay Amiga"	Yunel Cruz	
April 18	"We Never Looking Back"	Toby Love featuring French Montana	
April 25	"Pierdo La Cabeza"	Zion & Lennox	
May 2	"La Película"	J Alvarez featuring Cosculluela	
May 9	"Agua Bendita"	Víctor Manuelle	
May 16	"Agua Bendita"	Víctor Manuelle	
May 23	"Para Festejar"	Charlie Aponte	
May 30	"Fanatica Sensual"	Plan B	
June 6	"Mi Lugar Es Contigo"	Karlos Rosé	
June 13	"Agua Bendita"	Víctor Manuelle	
June 20	"Que Cosas Tiene El Amor"	Anthony Santos & Prince Royce	
June 27	"Por Si No Te Vuelvo A Ver"	Rolf Sanchez	
July 4	"Me Voy Enamorando"	Chino & Nacho featuring Farruko	
July 11	"Bajo, Piano & Bongo"	Ismael Miranda featuring Bobby Valentín, Richie Ray & Roberto Roena	
July 18	"Dificil"	Jorge Villamizar featuring Oscar D'Leon, Descemer Bueno & MoLa	
July 25	"Ahora Que Te Vas"	India	
August 1	"Un Beso"	Baby Rasta & Gringo	
August 8	"Aqui Nadie Toca"	Sharlene featuring Mozart La Para	
August 15	"Como Duele El Silencio"	Leslie Grace	
August 22	"Muevelo"	Juan Esteban	
August 29	"La Gozadera"	Gente de Zona Featuring Marc Anthony	
September 5	"Entre Mi Vida y La Tuya"	Fonseca	
September 12	"Tu Cuerpo Me Hace Bien"	Arcangel	
September 19	"No Queria Enganarte"	Victor Manuelle	
September 26	"No Queria Enganarte"	Victor Manuelle	
October 3	"No Queria Enganarte"	Victor Manuelle	
October 10	"Como Yo Te Quiero"	El Potro Alvarez Featuring Yandel	
October 17	"Si Me Tenias"	Tito Nieves	
October 24	"Rumba"	Anahi featuring Wisin	
October 31	"Vestida de Blanco"	Toby Love	
November 7	"Disfruta La Vida"	Antonio Barullo featuring J Alvarez & Flex	
November 14	"Te Vi"	Grupo Manía	
November 21	"Borró Cassette"	Maluma	
November 28	"El Perfume"	Fanny Lu	
December 5	"Un Idiota"	Charlie Zaa	
December 12	"La Receta"	Andres Cuervo	
December 19	"Que Se Siente"	Rolf Sanchez	
December 26	"Loco Pero Feliz"	Pirulo y La Tribu	
