= Nadie como tú =

Nadie como tú may refer to:

== Music ==
=== Albums ===
- Nadie como tú, 1990 album by Paloma San Basilio

=== Songs ===
- "Nadie como tú" (Leslie Grace song), 2014
- "Nadie como tú", 1995 song by Kiara
- "Nadie como tú", 1998 song by Chayanne from the album Atado a Tu Amor
- "Nadie como tú", 2007 song by Wisin & Yandel from the album Los Vaqueros Wild Wild Mixes
- "No Hay Nadie Como Tú", 2008 song by Calle 13

== Television ==
- Nadie como tú (TV series), 2023 Mexican television series
