= Cómo Duele el Silencio =

Single by Leslie Grace Banda Version featuring Luis Coronel

from the album Lloviendo Estrellas
- Released: May 18, 2015; September 18, 2015 (Banda Version)
- Genre: Bachata
- Length: 3:51; 3:05 (Banda Version)
- Label: Sony Music Latin
- Songwriters: Edgar Barrera; Efraín Dávila; Guianko Gómez; Leslie Grace

Leslie Grace singles chronology
"Nadie Como Tú" (2014)	"Cómo Duele el Silencio" (2015)	"Aire" (2015)

Music video
- "Cómo Duele El Silencio" on YouTube

"Cómo Duele El Silencio" ("How Silence Hurts") is a song recorded by Dominican-American singer Leslie Grace. it was released on May 18, 2015, by Sony Music Latin. The music video premiered on June 18, 2015, on the Telemundo news show Al Rojo Vivo. It was released online the next day. On September 18, 2015, she released a Banda version featuring Mexican-American singer Luis Coronel.

== Charts ==
Chart (2015)	Peak position
US Latin Pop Airplay (Billboard)	29
US Tropical Airplay (Billboard)	1

== See also ==
- List of number-one Billboard Tropical Songs of 2015
