= Day One =

Day One may refer to:

== Film ==
- Day One (1989 film), a 1989 television film
- Day One, also known as To Write Love on Her Arms, a 2012 drama film
- Day One (2015 film), a 2015 short film
- A Quiet Place: Day One, 2024 film

== Television ==
- Day One (TV program), a 1993–1995 news magazine program
- "Day One", a 1994 episode of ER
- Day 1, the first season of 24 (2001–2002)
- Day One (TV series), a planned 2009 television pilot
- "Day One" (Torchwood), a 2006 episode of Torchwood
- "Day One", a 2009 episode of Torchwood: Children of Earth
- "Day One" (The Last of Us), a 2025 episode of The Last of Us
- "Day One" (Doc), a 2025 episode of Doc

== Music ==
- Day One (band), an English trip hop band
- Day One (Birds of Tokyo album), a 2007 album by Birds of Tokyo
- Day One (From Ashes To New album), a 2016 album by From Ashes To New
- Day One (Sarah Slean album), a 2004 album by Sarah Slean
- Day One (Snob Scrilla album), a 2009 album by Snob Scrilla
- Day 1 (album), a 1991 album by Robbie Nevil
- "Day 1" (song), a song by Leslie Grace
- "Day 1", a 2015 song by Red Velvet from The Red
- "Day One", a 2015 song by Matthew West from Live Forever
- "Day One", a 2015 song by Chris Brown from Royalty
- "Day One", a 2011 song by Lights from Siberia

== Video games ==
- Half-Life: Day One, a Half-Life demo
- Day One: Garry's Incident, a video game by Wild Games Studio
- Day 1 Studios, an American videogame developer

== Other ==
- Day One (app), a personal journaling app for iOS, macOS and Android
- Day One (building), part of Amazon.com's downtown Seattle corporate headquarters
- Day One Christian Ministries, an organisation promoting Sunday as a day of rest, formerly known as the Lord's Day Observation Society (LDOS)
- WWE Day 1, a professional wrestling event
- First of the month, numbered 1 each month
