= Nadie como tú (Leslie Grace song) =

Single by Leslie Grace
- Released: June 23, 2014
- Genre: Bachata
- Length: 3:24
- Label: Top Stop Music
- Songwriter: Sergio George

Leslie Grace singles chronology
| "Odio No Odiarte" (2014) | "Nadie como tú" (2014) | "Cómo Duele el Silencio" (2015) |

"Nadie como tú" ("No One Like You") is a song recorded by American singer Leslie Grace. it was released by Top Stop Music on June 23, 2014. She also released a Spanglish remix featuring American rapper Fat Joe.

== Charts ==
| Chart (2014) | Peak position |
|---|---|
| US Tropical Airplay (Billboard) | 11 |
