= Sunset (Michel Teló album) =

Live album by Michel Teló
- Released: May 21, 2013
- Recorded: Brazil, 2013
- Genre: Sertanejo
- Length: 46:01
- Label: Som Livre (Brazil)

Michel Teló chronology
Michel Na Balada (2011)	Sunset (2013)	Bem Sertanejo (2014)

Sunset is Michel Teló's third live album and contains 16 songs. The single "Amiga da Minha Irmã" peaked at number 1 in Brazil. The album includes the hit songs "Maria", "É Nóis Faze Parapapá", "Levemente Alterado" and "Se Tudo Fosse Fácil".

The album also includes performances from other artists, such as Paula Fernandes on "Se Tudo Fosse Fácil", Bruno on "É Nóis Faze Parapapá" and Bruninho e Davi on "Levemente Alterado".

== Track listing ==
1. "Amiga da Minha Irmã" (2:47)
2. "Até de Manhã" (2:49)
3. "Levemente Alterado (feat. Bruninho & Davi)" (2:18)
4. "Pegada" (2:59)
5. "É Nóis Faze Parapapá (feat. Bruno)" (2:32)
6. "Maria" (3:06)
7. "Love Com Você (Vontade)" (2:48)
8. "Love Song" (2:58)
9. "Bora Passear" (2:59)
10. "Aconteceu" (3:09)
11. "Se Tudo Fosse Fácil (feat. Paula Fernandes)" (3:21)
12. "Fiquei Só" (2:40)
13. "Te Caço" (3:03)
14. "Jurerê" (2:33)
15. "Me Chama Pra Sorrir" (2:26)
16. "Coisa de Brasileiro" (3:22)

== Charts ==
Charts (2013)	Peak position
Brazil Albums (Billboard)	7

== Certifications ==
Region	Certification	Certified units/sales
Brazil (Pro-Música Brasil)	Gold	20,000^{*}
^{*} Sales figures based on certification alone.
