= Que Cosas Tiene el Amor =

- CD single cover

Single by Anthony Santos featuring Prince Royce

from the album Tócame
- Released: March 24, 2015
- Genre: Bachata
- Length: 4:19

Anthony Santos singles chronology
"Noche Bohemia" (2015)	"Que Cosas Tiene el Amor" (2015)	"Tócame" (2015)

Prince Royce singles chronology
"Solita" (2015)	"Que Cosas Tiene el Amor" (2015)	"Back It Up" (2015)

"Que Cosas Tiene el Amor" (transl. "The Things That Love Has") is a 2015 song by Dominican singer Anthony Santos and American singer Prince Royce. The song was released on March 24, 2015. It served as the first single for Santos' twenty-second studio album, Tócame (2015).

== Charts ==
Chart (2015)	Peak position
Dominican Republic Bachata (Monitor Latino)	1
Dominican Republic General (Monitor Latino)	3
US Hot Latin Songs (Billboard)	42
US Latin Airplay (Billboard)	31
US Tropical Airplay (Billboard)	1
