= Stuck on a Feeling =

Single by Prince Royce featuring Snoop Dogg

from the album Double Vision
- Released: November 24, 2014
- Genre: EDM
- Length: 3:30
- Label: RCA
- Songwriters: Calvin Broadus; Sam Martin; Daniel "Robopop" Omelio; Ross Golan
- Producer: Jason Evigan

Prince Royce singles chronology
"Soy el Mismo" (2014)	"Stuck on a Feeling" (2014)	"Solita" (2015)

Snoop Dogg singles chronology
"Vay-K" (2014)	"Stuck on a Feeling" (2014)	"Dumb Shit" (2015)

Music video
- "Stuck on a Feeling" on YouTube

"Stuck on a Feeling" is a 2014 song by American singer Prince Royce, featuring American rapper Snoop Dogg, released on November 24, 2014 as a single taken from Royce's fourth studio album Double Vision.

The artists co-wrote the song with Sam Martin, Robopop, and Ross Golan, while production was handled by Jason Evigan. The chorus samples the 2001 song "Dance with Me" by R&B group 112. A Spanish remix of the song was released on February 10, 2015 and features Colombian rapper J Balvin.

"Stuck on a Feeling" has become Royce's best performing single in the United States, having peaked at number 43 on the Billboard Hot 100 and 16 on the Mainstream Top 40 chart.

== Music video ==
The music video was released late December 10, 2014.

== Chart performance ==
"Stuck on a Feeling" debuted on the US Billboard Hot 100 at number 93. In its next week, the song rose to number 72, tying with previous Latin hit song "Darte un Beso" as his highest-peaking song. It later rose to number 68 in its third week, and eventually reached its highest peak, number 43, in its sixth week. This is Prince Royce's first song to break into the top 50 of the Billboard charts and his highest-charting song so far on the Hot 100. On the Billboard Pop Songs chart, it debuted at number 42 and reached a peak of 16 in its seventh week, becoming his first top 20 song on that chart.

He also charted for the first time in Canada, debuting at number 83 and peaking at number 67 in his second week, as well as in the Flanders region of Belgium, where "Stuck on a Feeling" reached number 65 in its fourth week.

"Stuck on a Feeling" is Prince Royce's first single to chart in Australia.

== Charts ==
Chart (2014–15)	Peak position
Australia (ARIA)	34
Belgium (Ultratop 50 Flanders)	65
Canada Hot 100 (Billboard)	46
Canada CHR/Top 40 (Billboard)	23
Canada Hot AC (Billboard)	49
US Billboard Hot 100	43
US Dance/Mix Show Airplay (Billboard)	28
US Latin Airplay (Billboard)	2
US Pop Airplay (Billboard)	16
US Rhythmic Airplay (Billboard)	16
US (Monitor Latino)	1

== Certifications ==
Region	Certification	Certified units/sales
Canada (Music Canada)	Gold	40,000^{‡}
United States (RIAA)	Gold	500,000^{‡}
^{‡} Sales+streaming figures based on certification alone.
