= Back It Up (Prince Royce song) =

Single by Prince Royce featuring Jennifer Lopez and Pitbull

from the album Double Vision
- Released: May 4, 2015 (original English version); May 12, 2015 (Spanish version)
- Length: 3:20
- Label: RCA
- Songwriters: Savan Kotecha; Ilya; Geoffrey Rojas; Armando Pérez
- Producers: Jason Evigan; Ilya

Prince Royce singles chronology
"Que Cosas Tiene el Amor" (2015)	"Back It Up" (2015)	"Culpa al Corazón" (2015)

Jennifer Lopez singles chronology
"Feel the Light" (2015)	"Back It Up" (2015)	"El Mismo Sol" (2015)

Pitbull singles chronology
"Fun" (2015)	"Back It Up" (2015)	"Baddest Girl in Town" (2015)

Music video
- "Back It Up" on YouTube

"Back It Up" is a 2015 song by American singer Prince Royce, featuring Jennifer Lopez and Pitbull. The song was released on May 4, 2015, as the second single taken from Royce's fourth studio album, Double Vision.

There are three versions available, a Spanglish version and a Spanish version, with both making chart appearances, and the original English version, featuring only Pitbull.

"Back It Up" marks as the eighth of nine collaborations between Lopez and Pitbull, in lined with "Fresh Out the Oven" in 2009, "On the Floor" in 2011, "Dance Again" in 2012, "Live It Up" in 2013, "We Are One (Ole Ola)" in 2014 with Claudia Leitte, "Booty" in 2014, a song entitled "Drinks for You (Ladies Anthem)" from Pitbull's Global Warming album in 2012 and followed by "Sexy Body" off his album Climate Change released in 2017.

== Track listing ==
Digital download

1. "Back It Up" (featuring Pitbull) – 3:21

Digital download

1. "Back It Up" (featuring Jennifer Lopez & Pitbull) – 3:20

Digital download Spanish version

1. "Back It Up" (featuring Jennifer Lopez & Pitbull) [Spanish Version] – 3:20

Other versions

- Dave Aude Club Mix – 5:56

== Music video ==
The music video was filmed in Miami and directed by Colin Tilley. It was released on June 9, 2015 The Spanglish version (included as the Album version) was used for the music video.

== Promotion ==
Prince Royce performed the song live on American Idol, along with Jennifer Lopez and Pitbull, on 13 May, Good Morning America on 27 July and The View on 28 July.

== Chart performance ==
The Spanish-language version of "Back It Up" debuted on the US Hot Latin Songs chart at number 27 for the week of May 30, 2015. Total sales for the week were 23,000 downloads.

== Charts ==
=== Weekly charts ===
Chart (2015–2016)	Peak position
Canada Hot 100 (Billboard)	56
Mexico (Billboard Ingles Airplay)	34
Spain (Promusicae) Spanish version	61
US Billboard Hot 100	92
US Hot Latin Songs (Billboard) Spanish version	19
US Latin Pop Airplay (Billboard)	10
US Tropical Airplay (Billboard)	7

=== Year-end charts ===
Chart (2015)	Position
US Hot Latin Songs (Billboard) Spanish version	46

== Certifications ==
Region	Certification	Certified units/sales
Canada (Music Canada)	Gold	40,000^{‡}
Poland (ZPAV)	Gold	10,000^{*}
Spain (Promusicae)	Gold	20,000^{‡}
United States (RIAA)	Gold	500,000^{‡}
^{*} Sales figures based on certification alone.^{‡} Sales+streaming figures based on certification alone.
