= Nada (Prince Royce song) =

Single by Prince Royce

from the album Soy el Mismo
- Released: March 28, 2014
- Genre: Bachata
- Length: 4:02
- Label: Sony Music Latin
- Songwriter(s): Geoffrey Rojas; Alberto J. Santos

Prince Royce singles chronology
"Te Robaré" (2014)	"Nada" (2014)	"Te Dar um Beijo" (2014)

Music video
- "Nada" on YouTube

"Nada" (transl. "Nothing") is a 2013 bachata song by American recording artist Prince Royce. The song was released in March 2014 as the third single lifted from Royce's third studio album, Soy el Mismo (2013).

== Music video ==
The music video was released on 28 March 2014.

== Chart performance ==
Chart (2014)	Peak position
Mexico (Monitor Latino)	8

== Awards and nominations ==
Year	Award	Category	Nominated	Result
2014	Premios Juventud	Favourite Video	Prince Royce "Nade"	Nominated
