= Prince Royce (album) =

Studio album by Prince Royce
- Released: March 2, 2010
- Genres: Latin pop; bachata; R&B
- Length: 37:04
- Label: Top Stop Music
- Producers: Sergio George (also exec.); George Elías (exec.); Andrés Hidalgo; George Meña; Bastiany; Gregory "Greko" Rojo; Nápoles; Prince Royce; D'Lesly Lora; Eduardo Aguilar

Prince Royce chronology
Prince Royce (2010)	Phase II (2012)

Singles from Prince Royce
- 1. "Stand by Me" Released: January 19, 2010; 2. "Corazón Sin Cara" Released: February 9, 2010; 3. "El Amor Que Perdimos" Released: January 2011; 4. "Mi Última Carta" Released: May 2011

Prince Royce is the debut studio album by American singer-songwriter Prince Royce; it was released on March 2, 2010, through Top Stop Music. The production was handled primarily by Andrés Hidalgo, with other contributions made by Sergio George (who also served as the album's executive producer), Eduardo Aguilar, George Meña, Bastiany, Gregory "Greko" Rojo and Nápoles. All songs were co-produced by Prince Royce and D'Lesly Lora.

In the United States, the album was a commercial success. Upon its US release, it debuted at number 16 on the Billboard Top Latin Albums chart. It eventually reached number one on both the US Billboard Tropical Albums and Top Latin Albums charts and was the best-selling Latin album of 2011 in the United States. It also peaked at number 77 on the all-genre Billboard 200 albums chart. In October 2011, Prince Royce was certified 3× Platinum (Latin field) in the United States by the Recording Industry Association of America (RIAA) and in 2020 it was certified 10× Platinum.

The album was also a commercial success in Chile, where it was certified 2× Platinum by the International Federation of the Phonographic Industry of Chile (IFPI Chile). The album was supported by four singles: "Stand By Me", "Corazón Sin Cara", "El Amor Que Perdimos" and "Mi Última Carta". The second single, "Corazón Sin Cara", reached number one on the Billboard Hot Latin Songs chart in the US, where it was the best-performing Latin song of 2011.

== Background ==
At age 15, Royce began making music and at the age of 19, when he met Andrés Hidalgo, who became his manager. Hidalgo began helping Royce work hands-on with bachata music. That was the specific moment in which Royce had decided that pursuing a musical career is what he wanted to do. Hidalgo later introduced Royce to Sergio George, who immediately signed the former to his label, Top Stop Music, after listening to three of his demos.

== Commercial reception ==
In the United States, Prince Royce debuted on the Billboard Latin Albums chart during the first week of March 2010 at number 15. Fifty-eight weeks after its release, Prince Royce reached the number one spot on the US Billboard Latin Albums on the week of April 23, 2011. On the Billboard Tropical Albums chart, the album debuted at number 2 on the week of March 20, 2010. The album peaked at number one on the Tropical Albums chart on the week of September 18, 2010 where it spent a total of fifty-three weeks on top. The album peaked at number 77 on the US Billboard 200 chart during the first week of April 2011 and remained on the chart for forty weeks. The album was the sixteenth best-selling Latin Album and second best-selling Tropical Album of 2010 and was the best-selling Latin and Tropical Albums of 2011. On October 25, 2011, the album was certified 3× platinum (Latin field) by the Recording Industry Association of America (RIAA) for shipments of 300,000 copies. The album was also a commercial success in Chile where it was certified 2× platinum by the IFPI Chile.

== Singles ==
"Stand by Me" was released as the lead single from the album on January 19, 2010. The song is bachata cover of American soul singer Ben E. King's original 1961 song. An English version and a version which features Ben E. King was released for digital download in July 2010 and November 2010, respectively. In the United States, the song was commercially successful in the Latin market, peaking at number one on the Billboard Tropical Songs chart. By early May 2010, the song had reached the top ten on the Billboard Latin Songs chart peaking at number 8.

"Corazón Sin Cara" was released as the album's second single and made available for digital download on February 9, 2010. It was Royce's second consecutive number one song on the Billboard Tropical Songs chart. It also reached the number one song on the Billboard Latin Songs chart, becoming his first song to top the chart. According to Billboard, it was the best-performing Latin single of 2011.

The album's third single "El Amor Que Perdimos", peaked at number 16 on the Hot Latin Songs chart. "

Mi Última Carta" was released as the album's fourth and final single, where it peaked at number 19 on the Hot Latin Songs chart and number 2 on the Tropical Songs chart.

== Critical reception ==
Professional ratings
Review scores
Source	Rating
About.com	4.5/5 stars
AllMusic	3/5 stars
The New York Times	(favorable)

In a positive review, Carlos Quintana of About.com commented on Royce's "artistic talent as a singer and composer." He noted that the incorporation of English lyrics on the album would help expose bachata music to unfamiliar audiences. He concluded by saying, "From beginning to end, Prince Royce is a very enjoyable album. This musical production is both refreshing and innovative." Jason Birchmeier of Allmusic gave a mixed review; praising Royce's vocals Hidalgo production of the album while criticizing the short duration of the album and Royce's "tendency to name-check himself far too often".

== Accolades ==
At the Latin Grammy Awards of 2011, the album received a nomination for Best Contemporary Tropical Album which was awarded to Juan Luis Guerra for A Son de Guerra.

At the Lo Nuestro Awards of 2011 Royce received three Lo Nuestro awards including Tropical Song of the Year for "Stand by Me", Tropical Artist of the Year, and Tropical Breakout Artist or Group of the Year while the album received a nomination for Tropical Album of the Year.

At the 2011 Casandra awards in the Dominican Republic, Royce received an award for New Artist of the Year and two nominations including Musical Album of the Year.

At the 2011 Premios Juventud, Royce received three awards including Tropical Male Artist of the Year, Tropical New Artist of the Year, and Tropical Song of the Year for Stand by Me and three nominations.

At the Lo Nuestro Awards of 2012, Royce received three awards for Tropical Male Artist of the Year, Tropical Traditional Artist of the Year, and Tropical Song of the Year for "El Amor Que Perdimos". "Mi Última Carta" received a nomination at the 2012 Casandra awards for "Bachata Song of the Year". At the 2012 Latin Billboard Awards Royce won six awards including "Album of the Year" and "Tropical Song of the Year" for "Corazón Sin Cara".

== Track listing ==
No.	Title	Writer(s)	Producer(s)	Length
1.	"Stand By Me" (Bachata Version)	Ben E. King; Mike Stoller; Jerry Leiber	Andrés Hidalgo; Sergio George; Prince Royce^{[a]}; D'Lesly Lora^{[a]}	3:25
2.	"Corazón Sin Cara"	Geoffrey Rojas	Hidalgo; George; Royce^{[a]}; Lora^{[a]}	3:31
3.	"Tú y Yo"	Rojas; Hidalgo	Hidalgo; George; Royce^{[a]}; Lora^{[a]}	4:06
4.	"Su Hombre Soy Yo"	Rojas; Hidalgo	Hidalgo; Royce^{[a]}; Lora^{[a]}	3:42
5.	"Recházame"	Rojas	Hidalgo; Royce^{[a]}; Lora^{[a]}	3:43
6.	"El Amor Que Perdimos"	Rojas; Hidalgo	Hidalgo; Royce^{[a]}; Lora^{[a]}	4:05
7.	"Mi Última Carta"	Rojas	Hidalgo; Royce^{[a]}; Lora^{[a]}	4:04
8.	"Crazy"	Rojas; Hidalgo	Gregory "Greko" Rojo; Nápoles; Royce^{[a]}; Lora^{[a]}	2:31
9.	"Rock the Pants"	Rojas; Eritza Laues; Dwayne Bastiany	Bastiany; Royce^{[a]}; Lora^{[a]}	3:39
10.	"Stand By Me" (Dance Version)	King; Stoller; Leiber	George Meña; Royce^{[a]}; Lora^{[a]}	4:09
Total length:				37:04

Notes

- ^{^[a]} signifies a co-producer

== Personnel ==
Track listing and personnel are adapted from the Prince Royce album liner notes.

- Sergio George – executive producer, producer, composer, keyboards
- Gregory Elías – executive producer
- Georgette Carolini – A&R coordinator
- Héctor Rivera – production coordinator, additional engineering
- Danny Hastings – creative direction, photography
- Latisha Cotto – director of operations
- Andrés Hidalgo – producer, composer, bachata co-arrangements, vocal arrangements, lead engineer
- Prince Royce – co-producer, composer, bachata co-arrangements, vocal co-arrangements, lead vocals
- D'Lesly Lora – co-producer, bachata arrangements, keyboards
- Steven Cruz – lead guitar, second guitar
- Gregory "Greko" Rojo – producer
- Nápoles – producer
- Bastiany – producer, composer
- Eritza Laues – vocal arrangements, composer
- Adam "Pikachu" Gomez – bass guitar
- Albert "Guin" Batista – güira
- Charlie Martínez – güira
- Raúl Bier – bongos
- Juan Salazar – arranger
- Alfredo Matheus – mixing engineer
- Jake Tanner – mixing engineer
- Javier Gutierrez – additional engineering
- Juan Mario "Mayito" Aracil – additional engineering
- Jose Bel Tre – bongos
- Ito – lead guitar, second guitar
- Alfredo Oliva – concert master
- Miami Symphonic Strings – strings
- Mikaelin 'Blue' Bluespruce – engineer, mix engineer

== Charts ==
=== Weekly charts ===
Chart (2010–2011)	Peak position
Chilean Albums	4
US Billboard 200	77
US Top Latin Albums (Billboard)	1
US Tropical Albums (Billboard)	1
US Heatseekers Albums (Billboard)	13
Venezuelan Albums (Recordland)	15

=== Year-end charts ===
Chart (2010)	Position
US Top Latin Albums (Billboard)	16
US Tropical Albums (Billboard)	2
Chart (2011)	Position
US Top Latin Albums (Billboard)	1
US Tropical Albums (Billboard)	1
Chart (2012)	Position
US Top Latin Albums (Billboard)	14
Chart (2019)	Position
US Top Latin Albums (Billboard)	87
Chart (2021)	Position
US Top Latin Albums (Billboard)	97

== Certifications ==
Region	Certification	Certified units/sales
Chile	2× Platinum	15,000
Italy (FIMI)	Gold	25,000^{‡}
United States (RIAA)	13× Platinum (Latin)	780,000^{‡}
^{‡} Sales+streaming figures based on certification alone.

== Release history ==
List of release dates, showing country, formats, record label, and catalog number
Region	Date	Format	Label	Catalog
United States	March 2, 2010	CD, digital download	Top Stop Music	B0038YV36U
Canada	March 2, 2010	Import	Top Stop Music	B0034BW9CO
United Kingdom	March 2, 2010	Import	Sony International	B0034BW9CO
France	March 2, 2010	Import	Top Stop Music	B0034BW9CO
Italy	April 2, 2010	CD, digital download	Planet Records	B003H6950A
Mexico	May 18, 2010	CD, digital download	Top Stop Music	
Spain	May 22, 2010	CD, digital download	Planet Records	
