= Incondicional =

Single by Prince Royce

from the album Phase II
- Released: June 12, 2012
- Recorded: Top Stop Music Studios (Delray Beach, Florida)
- Genre: Bachata, Mariachi, Latin pop
- Length: 3:33
- Label: Top Stop
- Songwriters: Daniel Santacruz, Geoffrey Rojas, Sergio George
- Producer: Sergio George

Prince Royce singles chronology
"Las Cosas Pequeñas" (2012)	"Incondicional" (2012)	"Te Me Vas" (2012)

"Incondicional" is a song by Prince Royce on his album Phase ll and is a mixture of Mexican music and Bachata. It was released on June 12, 2012. At the 2012 Latin Grammy Award ceremony, Royce performed the song live with Mexican singer-songwriter Joan Sebastian.

== Music video ==
Prince Royce did the music video in Mexico City where he is singing to the girl that he is in love with.

== Charts ==
Chart (2012)	Peak position
US Hot Latin Songs (Billboard)	2
US Latin Airplay (Billboard)	1
US Latin Pop Airplay (Billboard)	3
US Tropical Airplay (Billboard)	1

== Certifications ==
Region	Certification	Certified units/sales
United States (RIAA)	4× Platinum (Latin)	240,000^{‡}
^{‡} Sales+streaming figures based on certification alone.

== See also ==
- List of Billboard number-one Latin songs of 2012
