= Te Me Vas =

Single by Prince Royce

from the album Phase II
- Released: December 3, 2012
- Recorded: Top Stop Music
- Genre: Bachata, Latin pop
- Length: 3:18
- Label: Top Stop
- Songwriters: Guainko de Gomez, Eduardo Aguilar, Efrain Davila, Rojas

Prince Royce singles chronology
"Incondicional" (2012)	"Te Me Vas" (2012)	"Te Perdiste Mi Amor" (2013)

"Te Me Vas" (English: "You Are Going") is a 2012 song by American singer Prince Royce. The song was released in December 2012 as the third and final single taken from Royce's second studio album, Phase II (2012). It received a Lo Nuestro nomination for Tropical Song of the Year.

== Music video ==
The music video for "Te Me Vas" was released in August 2013.

== Charts ==
Chart (2012/13)	Peak position
US Hot Latin Songs (Billboard)	2
US Latin Airplay (Billboard)	1
US Tropical Airplay (Billboard)	1

== Awards and nominations ==
Year	Ceremony	Award	Result
2014	Lo Nuestro Awards	Tropical Song of the Year	Nominated
2014	BMI Latin Music Awards	Award-winning song	Won

== See also ==
- List of Billboard number-one Latin songs of 2013
- List of number-one Billboard Tropical Songs of 2013
