= Las Cosas Pequeñas =

Single by Prince Royce

from the album Phase II
- Released: January 11, 2012
- Recorded: Top Stop Music Studios (Delray Beach, Florida)
- Genre: Bachata, R&B, Latin pop
- Length: 3:35
- Label: Top Stop
- Songwriter(s): Anthony López
- Producer(s): Sergio George

Prince Royce singles chronology
"El Verdadero Amor Perdona" (2011)	"Las Cosas Pequeñas" (2012)	"Incondicional" (2012)

"Las Cosas Pequeñas" (English: "The Little Things") is a Latin pop and bachata song by American recording artist Prince Royce. It was written by Royce, Anthony López and Sergio George, who also produced it. It released as the first single from his second studio album, Phase II. It premiered on Latin radio on January 10, 2012 and was digitally released the following day by Top Stop Music.

Royce has said that the song is about the little things that don't cost a lot and have great sentimental worth. The music video for the song, which was filmed at Central Park in New York City, was directed by Carlos Pérez of Elastic People.

== Background ==
After the promotional buzz single, "Addicted" was released, it was announced that "Las Cosas Pequeñas" would follow up as the official first single from Phase II. On January 4, 2012, a 31-second snippet of the song was posted on the official Prince Royce website. It had then made its premiere on La Mega 97.9 FM on January 10, 2012. According to Royce's official website, he'd talked about the song's concept, stating, "'Las Cosas Pequeñas" is about those things that may not cost a lot but have great sentimental value and mean so much to us." The song's title translates to "The Little Things" in English, which is what Royce had said the song is about.

== Chart performance ==
"Las Cosas Pequeñas" simultaneously debuted on the US Billboard Latin songs and Tropical Songs chart at number four and number one, respectively.

== Critical reception ==
The song received mostly mixed to positive reviews. On the review for the album, David Jeffries of AllMusic called the song the massive hit, and also marked it as an Allmusic pick on the track list. Brad Shoup gave the song a seven out of ten stars and commented, "Assured swirl that’s half-bachata, half-throwback slow jam, but mostly about its own charm. Tragically, there’s no texture to the plastic picking; the bell synth patch tries its best to cover for it. That Royce’s own name is an emetic remains a deeply unfortunate coincidence." Jonathan Bogart gave the single a five out of ten stars and said, "It’s deeply unfortunate that this boring lullaby is the Jukebox’s introduction to Royce. Not that he’s ever really been a cause for pulse-rate-raising (unless his duet with Daddy Yankee counts), but his early singles had more sparkle and snap to them — he even made “Stand By Me” interesting, and in the twenty-first century! — and with the exception of the obligatory steel-guitar solo (it is bachata, after all) this one just kind of sits there. Which wouldn’t be so bad, except the “na na na na na na” hook sounds almost exactly like Mike Birbiglia’s Kenny G impression." Anthony Easton also gave the song a five out of ten stars and said, "There is a thin line between gossamer-thin elegance and reductive laziness, and this one dances all over it." John Seroff gave the song a six out of ten stars and commented, "If pop-crossover bachata was a thing (and I can’t imagine why it wouldn’t be), it would sound like this only with more, you know, English. “Pequeñas” is still and all pretty accessible once you’re inside the language barrier, all pillow-soft balladeering and windchime quiet storm contrapunted with Spanish guitar. A tetch on the unctuous side but when you get under a rolling RRROYCE who wouldn’t expect to get a little oil on their britches?" Michaela Drapes gave the single a seven out of ten stars and stated that she was a little suspicious, that noodeling in the opening made me a little nervous, but as soon as the Latin percussion kicked in, she knew it was all going to be all right. Drapes would go on to say that she especially loved how the light-handed R&B-flavored production matches the lyric. "I generally associate songs like this with that classically creaky, ratcheting, slightly dated tropical production that is, dare I say it, comfortably tacky. But this is quite nicely done, I’m quite taken by surprise!" Jer Fairall gave the song a seven out of ten stars and called it "A lovely little panty wetter of a song". He would go on to say that it was "engineered by picking its way through the most fitting genre affectations: find a smooth piano intro out of the creamiest R&B slow jam here, an exotic little flamenco twist there, and a vocal (and a vocalist) pretty enough to make the most committed boy band hater swoon. Only the drippy, overstated strings threaten to kill the mood, and even then only ever so slightly." Katherine St. Asaph gave the song a six out of ten stars and said, "Smooth, harmless and weightless romance, and if those adjectives seem faintly damning, you should hear the ones I’m withholding because I just decried them. If it were 1985, not 2012, this wouldn’t need an extra benefit-of-the doubt point."

== Music video ==
Prince Royce in the music video for "Las Cosas Pequeñas".

The music video for "Las Cosas Pequeñas" was directed by Puerto Rican-born Carlos Pérez of Elastic People and was filmed at Central Park in New York City on May 1, 2012. Royce said he picked Central Park to film the music video because he was born in The Bronx and always remembers being inside Central Park writing songs and dreaming that one day he would be a hit on the radio. He said that it is a place with nice memories.

== Track listing ==
1. "Las Cosas Pequeñas" – 3:35

== Personnel ==
- Sergio George – producer, drums, arrangements, writer
- Geoffrey Rojas – co-producer, choir, writer
- Robinson Hernández – first guitar
- Steven Cruz – second guitar
- Tony Rijos – electric guitar
- Adan Gomez – bass
- Christopher Mercedes – bass
- Raúl Bier – bongos
- Angel Vasquez – güira
- Arthur Hanlon – piano
- Guianko "Yanko" Gomez – choir, recording, vocal producer
- Alfredo Matheus – mixing
- Juan Mario Aracil "Mayito" – recording
- Carlos Alvarez – recording

== Accolades ==
At the 2012 Premios Juventud, "Las Cosas Pequeñas" was awarded Catchiest Tune, Best Ballad, Best Ringtone and My Favorite Video. At the first annual Premios Tu Mundo award ceremony, the song won Song That Steals My Heart. It was nominated for Tropical Song of the Year at the Premio Lo Nuestro 2013.

== Charts ==
Chart (2012)	Peak position
US Latin Songs (Billboard)	1
US Latin Pop Songs (Billboard)	1
US Hot 100 Airplay (Billboard)	69
US Heatseekers Songs (Billboard)	15
US Tropical Songs (Billboard)	1
Venezuela Top Latino (Record Report)	28

== Certifications ==
Region	Certification	Certified units/sales
United States (RIAA)	3× Platinum (Latin)	180,000^{‡}
^{‡} Sales+streaming figures based on certification alone.

== Release history ==
Region	Date	Label	Format	Catalog
United States	January 11, 2012	Top Stop Music	Digital download	B006VA4XQK

== See also ==
- List of Billboard number-one Latin songs of 2012
