= Mi Última Carta =

Single by Prince Royce

from the album Prince Royce
- Released: May 2011
- Length: 4:05
- Label: Top Stop Music
- Songwriter: Geoffrey Rojas
- Producer: Andrés Hidalgo; & Eduardo Aguilar

Prince Royce singles chronology
"Ven Conmigo" (2011)	"Mi Última Carta" (2011)	"El Verdadero Amor Perdona" (2011)

"Mi Última Carta" (English: "My Last Letter") is a 2010 song by American singer Prince Royce. The song was released in May 2011 as the fourth and final single taken from Royce's eponymous debut studio album (2010).

== Charts ==
Chart (2011)	Peak position
US Hot Latin Songs (Billboard)	19
US Tropical Airplay (Billboard)	2

== Certifications ==
Region	Certification	Certified units/sales
United States (RIAA)	8× Platinum (Latin)	480,000^{‡}
^{‡} Sales+streaming figures based on certification alone.
