= Te Robaré (Prince Royce song) =

Single by Prince Royce

from the album Soy el Mismo
- Released: February 3, 2014
- Genre: Bachata
- Length: 3:39
- Label: Sony Music Latin
- Songwriters: Geoffrey Rojas; D'Lesly "Dice" Lora; Yonathan Then

Prince Royce singles chronology
| "Darte un Beso" (2013) | "Te Robaré" (2014) | "Nada" (2014) |

Music video
- "Te Robaré" on YouTube

"Te Robaré" (transl. "I’ll Kidnap You") is a 2013 bachata song by American recording artist Prince Royce. The music video was released February 3, 2014 and it serves as the second single lifted from Royce's third studio album, Soy el Mismo (2013).

== Charts ==
=== Weekly charts ===
| Chart (2014–15) | Peak position |
|---|---|
| Mexico (Monitor Latino) | 5 |
| Spain (PROMUSICAE) | 29 |
| US Hot Latin Songs (Billboard) | 4 |
| US Latin Airplay (Billboard) | 1 |
| US Tropical Airplay (Billboard) | 1 |

=== Year-end charts ===
| Chart (2014) | Position |
|---|---|
| US Hot Latin Songs (Billboard) | 13 |

== Certifications ==
| Region | Certification | Certified units/sales |
|---|---|---|
| Spain (PROMUSICAE) | Gold | 30,000^{‡} |
| United States (RIAA) | 7× Platinum (Latin) | 420,000^{‡} |
^{‡} Sales+streaming figures based on certification alone.

== Awards and nominations ==
| Year | Award | Category | Nominated | Result |
|---|---|---|---|---|
| 2014 | Premios Juventud | Favourite Song | Prince Royce "Te Robaré" | Nominated |
| 2014 | Premios Juventud | Favourite Video | Prince Royce "Te Robaré" | Nominated |
| 2014 | Premios Juventud | Favourite Ring Tone | Prince Royce "Te Robaré" | Nominated |
| 2015 | Lo Nuestro Awards | Tropical Song of the Year | Prince Royce "Te Robaré" | Nominated |

== See also ==
- List of Billboard number-one Latin songs of 2014
