= El Amor Que Perdimos =

Single by Prince Royce

from the album Prince Royce
- Released: January 2011
- Length: 4:05
- Label: Top Stop Music
- Songwriters: Geoffrey Rojas; Andrés Hidalgo
- Producers: Andrés Hidalgo; Sergio George

Prince Royce singles chronology
"Corazón Sin Cara" (2010)	"El Amor Que Perdimos" (2011)	"Ven Conmigo" (2011)

"El Amor Que Perdimos" (English: "The Love That We Lost") is a 2010 song by American singer Prince Royce. The song was released in January 2011 as the third single taken from Royce's eponymous debut studio album (2010). It won the Lo Nuestro Award for Tropical Song of the Year.

== Charts ==
=== Weekly charts ===
Chart (2011)	Peak position
US Hot Latin Songs (Billboard)	16
US Tropical Airplay (Billboard)	17

=== Year-end charts ===
Chart (2011)	Position
US Hot Latin Songs (Billboard)	55

== Certifications ==
Region	Certification	Certified units/sales
United States (RIAA)	25× Platinum (Latin)	1,500,000^{‡}
^{‡} Sales+streaming figures based on certification alone.
