= Na Balada =

Live album by Michel Teló
- Released: 18 December 2011
- Recorded: Brazil, 2011
- Genre: Sertanejo universitário
- Label: Som Livre (Brazil); Universal Music (UMG); CNR (Belgium); Syco (UK/Ireland)

Michel Teló chronology
Michel Teló - Ao Vivo (2010)	Na Balada (2011)

Na Balada is a live album by Brazilian recording artist Michel Teló. The album became popular because of the international hit single "Ai Se Eu Te Pego" included as the opening track.

== CD track listing ==
CD

1. "Ai Se Eu Te Pego" (2:50)
2. "Humilde Residência" (3:13)
3. "Coincidência" (3:03)
4. "Vamo Mexê" Part. especial: Bruninho & Davi (2:44)
5. "Se Eu Não For" (2:50)
6. "Desce do Muro" (2:31)
7. "Pra Ser Perfeito" (3:07)
8. "Pensamentos Bons" Part. esp.: Teófilo Teló (3:21)
9. "Se Intrometeu" (2:47)
10. "Eu Te amo e Open Bar" (3:22)
11. "Fugidinha" (3:07)
12. "Ponto Certo" (3:16)
13. "É Mara" (2:53)
14. Pop-porri (medley) "Telefone Mudo" / "Boate Azul" (3:28)
15. "Vida Bela Vida" (4:02)

Re-Release (2012)

1. "If I Catch You (Chill Version I)" (2:51)
2. "Ai Se Eu Te Pego (Worldwide RMX)" (Feat. Pitbull) (4:05)
3. "Bara Bará Bere Berê" (2:44)

== DVD track listing ==
The songs are slightly in different order with an additional track "Ei, psiu beijo me liga" included.

The DVD also includes 3 bonuses being music videos for "Pra ser perfeito" and "Ai se eu te pego!" and a feature "Making of"

1. "Ai Se Eu Te Pego!"
2. "Humilde Residência"
3. "Coincidência"
4. "Se Intrometeu"
5. "Se Eu Não For"
6. "Pra Ser Perfeito"
7. "Desce do Muro"
8. "Pensamentos Bons" (Part. especial Teofiló Teló)
9. "Eu Te Amo e Open Bar"
10. "Fugidinha"
11. "Ponto Certo"
12. "Vamo Mexê" (Part. especial Bruninho & Davi)
13. "É Mara"
14. Pop-porri (medley) "Telefone Mudo" / "Boate Azul"
15. "Vida Bela Vida"
16. "Ei, Psiu Beijo Me Liga"

Bonus:

- Music clip "Pra ser Perfeito"
- Music clip "Ai Se Eu Te Pego!"
- Making Of

=== Chart positions ===
Chart (2012)	Peak position
Portuguese DVD Chart (AFP)	3

== Charts and certifications ==
=== Chart positions ===
Chart (2012)	Peak position
Argentinian Albums (CAPIF)	3
Austrian Albums (Ö3 Austria)	10
Belgian Albums (Ultratop Flanders)	14
Belgian Albums (Ultratop Wallonia)	29
Brazilian Albums (ABPD)	2
Canadian Albums (Nielsen SoundScan)	66
Dutch Albums (Album Top 100)	13
French Albums (SNEP)	4
German Albums (Offizielle Top 100)	11
Italian Albums (FIMI)	53
Mexican Albums (AMPROFON)	22
Polish Albums (ZPAV)	6
Portuguese Albums (AFP)	2
Spanish Albums (Promusicae)	10
Swiss Albums (Schweizer Hitparade)	2
US World Albums (Billboard)	6

=== Certifications ===
Country	Provider	Certification
France	SNEP	Platinum
Poland	ZPAV	Platinum
Portugal	AFP	Platinum
Romania	UPFR	Platinum
Switzerland	IFPI	Gold

=== Year-end charts ===
Chart (2012)	Position
Austrian Albums (Ö3 Austria)	63
Belgian Albums (Ultratop Flanders)	70
Dutch Albums (Album Top 100)	68
French Albums (SNEP)	34
Swiss Albums (Schweizer Hitparade)	23

== See also ==
- List of certified albums in Romania
