= Michel Teló =

Brazilian singer (born 1981)

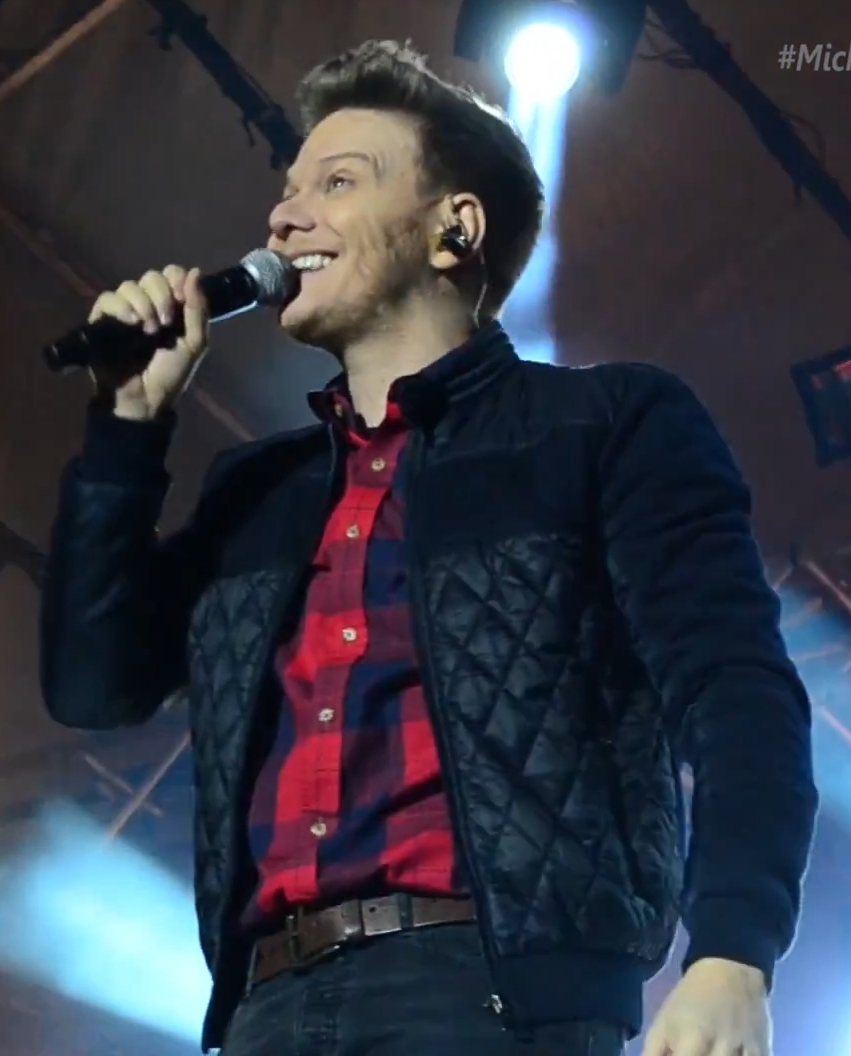
- Teló in 2018

Background information
- Born: 21 January 1981 (age 45); Medianeira, Paraná, Brazil
- Origin: Campo Grande, Mato Grosso do Sul, Brazil
- Genres: Sertanejo; country; Sertanejo universitário; arrocha
- Occupations: Singer; songwriter; musician
- Instruments: Vocals; accordion; harmonica; guitar
- Years active: 1998–present
- Label: Universal Music Brazil
- Formerly of: Tradição

Michel Teló (Brazilian Portuguese: [miˈʃɛw teˈlɔ]) (born 21 January 1981) is a Brazilian sertanejo singer-songwriter and actor. Before his solo act, he was a lead singer in various bands, most notably Grupo Tradição. His biggest national and international hit "Ai Se Eu Te Pego" reached number one in most European and Latin American charts.

Teló's artistic career began in 1987 when he made his first solo performance in his school choir, singing a piece by Roberto Carlos and Erasmo Carlos. At ten, his father gave him an accordion. At age 12, upon encouragement by neighbors, school friends, and his brothers, he formed a band, "Guri," which played traditional music. He was the band's lead singer and composer. Besides his love for the harmonica, Teló also took piano lessons for five years. He was also a dancer and played the accordion, harmonica, and guitar.

== Grupo Tradição (1997–2008) ==
In 1997, Teló joined the band Grupo Tradição where he sang the band's biggest hits, such as "Barquinho", "O Caldeirão", "Pra Sempre Minha Vida", "A Brasileira", and "Eu Quero Você." In 2008, he left Grupo Tradição, and his final album with the band, Micareta Sertaneja 2, was nominated for a Latin Grammy in the Brazilian music category. He was replaced by Guilherme Bertoldo, but the band had lost most of its appeal due to his departure and soon members began to quit the band, not having enough trust in the viability of the band without Teló.

== Solo career (2008–present) ==
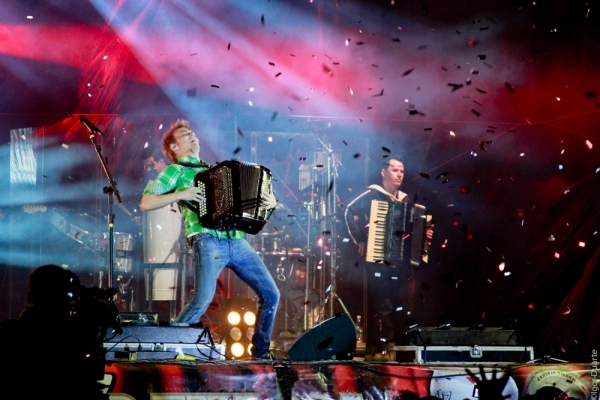
Michel Teló live

Teló’s debut solo album Balada Sertaneja was released in 2009 by Brazilian record label Som Livre. It was produced by Ivan Myazato and had two charting singles: "Ei, psiu! Beijo me liga" and "Amanhã sei lá". The release of the live album Michel Teló – Ao Vivo earned him a gold disc and featured the single “Fugidinha,” which reached number one in the Brazilian Hot 100 charts.

Throughout 2011, Teló played over 240 shows. According to Forbes magazine, Teló's Fugidinha Tour was attended by more than 17 million people, and Teló reportedly made $18 million alone in 2011. Teló has also released two DVDs, one containing songs from the 1980/90s and in collaboration with Milionário & José Rico, Bruno e Marrone, and João Bosco & Vinícius, and the other, entitled Michel Na Balada, which contained new songs.

In 2014, Michel Teló worked with Prince Royce to create a Portuguese version of Royce's song "Darte un Beso". The pair performed it live together for the first time at the Premios Billboard Latin Awards ceremony in late April of that year.

From 2015–2023, Teló was a coach on The Voice Brasil and The Voice Kids Brasil. Out of his eleven seasons, 8 of them were won by his team. Marking Teló the second most winningest of The Voice franchise, behind Blake Shelton with 9 wins overall.

== International fame ==
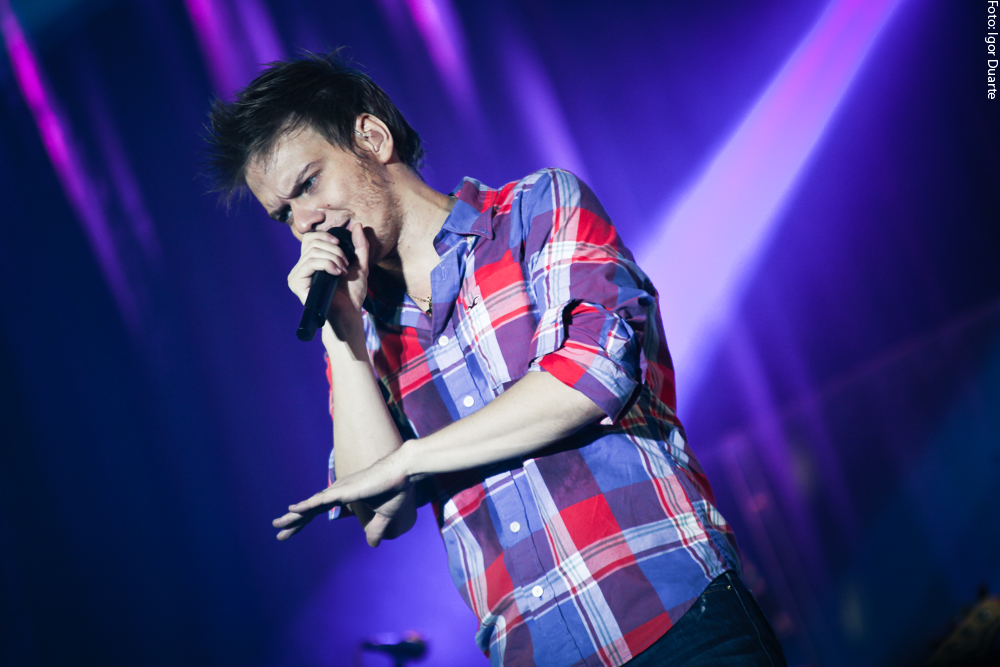
Teló in a 2011 sertanejo festival

In 2011, Telo released "Ai Se Eu Te Pego," which became popular when Brazilian soccer player Neymar danced to the song in a viral YouTube video. In the Spanish professional league, Marcelo and Cristiano Ronaldo of Real Madrid danced to the song when Ronaldo scored the first goal against Málaga on October 22, 2011. On October 29, 2011, Brazilian left-back André Santos danced to “Ai Se Eu Te Pego” after scoring the 2–2 equalizer in Arsenal's 5–3 victory over London rivals Chelsea. In the Super League Greece, Simão Mate, Cleyton, Sebastián Leto, and other Panathinaikos' players danced to it when Cleyton scored the first goal against PAOK on October 30, 2011. Other players who have publicly celebrated to this song include: Adrian Mierzejewski, Marco Reus, Lewis Holtby, Alexandre Pato, Kevin-Prince Boateng, Robinho, Lucas, Maxi Rodríguez, Sebastián Coates, Marquinhos, Ricardo Laborde, Felipe Melo, Emmanuel Eboué, and Farid El Alagui.

== Awards and nominations ==
Teló won the award for "Best Tormentone" at the 2012 TRL Awards. In April of that year, Michel Teló sang "Oh If I Catch You" at the Billboard Latin Music Awards, but he was not nominated for any awards.

In 2013, Michel Teló was nominated for seven categories for the Billboard Latin Music Awards. He won Song of the Year for “Ai Se Eu Te Pego.”

In 2015, his compilation Bem Sertanejo was nominated for the 16th Latin Grammy Awards in the Best Sertaneja Music Album category.

In 2020, his album Churrasco do Teló Vol. 2 was nominated for the 21st Latin Grammy Awards in the Best Sertaneja Music Album category. In the following edition, his album Pra Ouvir no Fone was nominated for the same category.

== Discography ==
=== Studio albums ===
- 2009: Balada Sertaneja

=== Compilation albums ===
- 2014: Bem Sertanejo

=== Live albums ===
- 2010: Michel Teló Ao Vivo
- 2011: Michel na Balada
- 2013: Sunset
- 2015: Baile do Teló

=== Collaborative ===
- 2010: «Alô» (de Léo & Junior)
- 2011: «Vamo Mexê» (con Bruninho & Davi)
- 2013: «Como le gusta a tu cuerpo» (de Carlos Vives)
- 2013: «Que viva la vida (Remix)» (de Wisin)
- 2014: «Te dar um Beijo» («Darte un beso» de Prince Royce)
