= Soy el Mismo (song) =

Single by Prince Royce

from the album Soy el Mismo
- Released: August 8, 2014
- Genre: Bachata
- Length: 3:43
- Label: Sony Music Latin
- Songwriters: Geoffrey Rojas; Daniel Santacruz

Prince Royce singles chronology
"Te Dar um Beijo" (2014)	"Soy el Mismo" (2014)	"Stuck on a Feeling" (2014)

Music video
- "Soy el Mismo" on YouTube

"Soy el Mismo" (transl. "I'm the Same") is a 2013 bachata song by American recording artist Prince Royce. The song was released in August 2014 as the fourth single lifted from Royce's third studio album, Soy el Mismo (2013). In the same month, he released a Regional Mexican version with Roberto Tapia. This version was referred in the title as Versión Banda (Band Version).

== Music video ==
The music video was released on August 8, 2014. A week later on August 15, 2014 he released remake of the video which included Roberto Tapia and the Band version of the song.

== Charts ==
=== Weekly charts ===
Chart (2014)	Peak position
US Hot Latin Songs (Billboard)	8
US Latin Airplay (Billboard)	6
US Tropical Airplay (Billboard)	1

=== Year-end charts ===
Chart (2014)	Position
US Hot Latin Songs (Billboard)	17

== Certifications ==
Region	Certification	Certified units/sales
United States (RIAA)	5× Platinum (Latin)	300,000^{‡}
^{‡} Sales+streaming figures based on certification alone.
