= Corazón Sin Cara =

Single by Prince Royce

from the album Prince Royce
- Released: February 9, 2010
- Genre: Bachata, urban
- Length: 3:31
- Label: Top Stop
- Songwriter: Geoffrey Rojas
- Producers: Andrés Hidalgo, Sergio George, Eduardo Aguilar

Prince Royce singles chronology
"Stand by Me" (2010)	"Corazón Sin Cara" (2010)	"El Amor Que Perdimos" (2011)

"Corazón Sin Cara" (transl. "Love is Blind," literally "Heart Without a Face") is a bachata song by American singer-songwriter Prince Royce. It was written and composed by Prince Royce, and produced by Eduardo Aguilar, Andrés Hidalgo, and Sergio George. The song's lyrical content deals with the self-esteem of girls and their appearance. The song also includes violins and cellos, which Royce notes aren't normally used in bachata music. It is recognized as one of Prince Royce's signature songs.

The song was released as the second single from Royce's eponymous debut studio album in the United States in early February 2010, by Top Stop Music. The song peaked at number one on the US Billboard Tropical Songs chart, and a year later after its official release, reached number one on the US Billboard Latin Songs chart, becoming Royce's first number one song the chart. It was named the best-selling Latin single of 2011 by Billboard. The music video was directed by Danny Hastings and the theme of the video shows Royce appreciating a woman the way she is.

== Background ==
Prince Royce "Corazón Sin Cara" (2010)
21-second sample.

"Corazón Sin Cara" was written and composed solely by Prince Royce, produced by Andrés Hidalgo and Sergio George and co-produced by Royce and D'Lesly "Dice" Lora. In an interview with nocheLatina, Royce was asked to describe the lyrics of the song. He said that it is about "girls who always wear makeup or think they're fat or they're ugly...it's not all about the materialistic things and the image. It's not just about that." "Corazón Sin Cara" is a bachata song featuring "elegant" string arrangements. Royce pointed out the inclusion of instruments on the song such as violins and cellos, noting that such instruments are not normally used in bachata music. The final ten seconds of the track transition into heavier urban beats.

== Critical reception and awards ==
Chris Ryan of MTV said that the song "will evoke hot, uptown summer nights". While Allmusic's Jason Birchmeier commended Andrés Hidalgo for the "crisp production job." He noted the final ten seconds saying, "It's not until those final ten seconds that the urban beats kick in after three and a half minutes of more or less typical bachata graced with an elegant string arrangement." By late February 2011, "Corazón Sin Cara" was the most requested song in Latin radio in the United States.

== Chart performance ==
In the United States, the song was released by the label, Top Stop Music, as a single and made available for digital download on February 9, 2010. The song entered the US Billboard Tropical Songs chart in mid July 2010 and ascended into the top ten at number four by the first week of October 2010. On the week of October 23, 2010, the song reached number one on the Tropical Songs chart but was eventually replaced by Shakira's "Loca". On the Billboard year-end charts, the song ranked number thirty-eight on the Latin Songs chart, number twenty-two on the Latin Pop Songs chart and number sixteen on the Tropical Songs chart. By the end of February 2011, "Corazón Sin Cara" became a greatest gainer on both the Tropical Songs and Latin Songs charts, pushing back into the number one spot on the Tropical Songs chart. A year after its official release, the song (also a greatest gainer) reached number one on the US Billboard Latin Songs chart and became Royce's first number one song on the chart. According to Billboard, it was the best-performing Latin single of 2011.

== Music video ==
The music video for the song was directed by Danny Hastings and released by the record label. The video premiered on Vevo on August 30, 2010. The video for the song was released to Apple's iTunes Store on February 2, 2010, and a new version was issued on September 14, 2010.

The video begins with Royce entering a room with an unnamed female, who plays Royce's love interest. Royce sits down in a chair and begins playing an acoustic guitar and sings the song to her. The girl then takes it from him and he hugs her as they begin to dance. Throughout the rest of video, scenes of the two dancing are intercut with shots of Royce singing in front of the camera or playing the guitar. At the 2011 Premios Juventud Awards, "Corazón Sin Cara" was nominated for My Favorite Video.

== Track listing ==
Single

1. "Corazón Sin Cara" – 3:31

2.0 Version

1. "Corazón Sin Cara" – 3:30

== Personnel ==
Credits are adapted from the Prince Royce album liner notes.

- Geoffrey "Royce" Rojas – songwriter, co-producer, bachata co-arrangements, vocal co-arrangements, lead vocals
- Andrés "Dre" Hidalgo – Record producer, bachata co-arrangements, vocal arrangements, lead engineer
- Sergio George – producer
- D'Lesly "Dice" Lora – co-producer, bachata arrangements, keyboards
- Steven Cruz – lead guitar, second guitar
- Adam "Pikachu" Gomez – bass guitar
- Albert Batista – güira
- Raúl Bier – bongos
- Juan Salazar – arranger
- Alfredo Matheus – mixing engineer
- Alfredo Oliva – concert master
- Miami Symphonic Strings – strings

== Charts ==
=== Weekly charts ===
Chart (2010)	Peak position
US Tropical Airplay (Billboard)	1
Chart (2011)	Peak position
US Bubbling Under Hot 100 (Billboard)	3
US Hot Latin Songs (Billboard)	1
Venezuela Top Latino (Record Report)	1

=== Year-end charts ===
Chart (2010)	Position
US Hot Latin Songs (Billboard)	38
Chart (2011)	Position
US Hot Latin Songs (Billboard)	1

=== Decade-end charts ===
Chart (2010–2019)	Position
US Hot Latin Songs (Billboard)	15

=== All-time charts ===
Chart (2021)	Position
US Hot Latin Songs (Billboard)	39

== Certifications ==
Region	Certification	Certified units/sales
Canada (Music Canada)	Platinum	80,000^{‡}
Italy (FIMI)	Gold	50,000^{‡}
Spain (Promusicae)	Platinum	60,000^{‡}
United States (RIAA)	5× Diamond (Latin)	3,000,000^{‡}
^{‡} Sales+streaming figures based on certification alone.

== See also ==
- List of number-one Billboard Hot Tropical Songs of 2010
- List of number-one Billboard Top Latin Songs of 2011
