= Ven Conmigo (song) =

2011 single by Daddy Yankee and Prince Royce

Single by Daddy Yankee featuring Prince Royce

from the album Prestige
- Released: April 13, 2011
- Genre: Merengue; electronic; pop
- Length: 3:40
- Label: El Cartel, Sony Music
- Songwriters: Raymond Ayala, Geoffrey Rojas, Anthony López
- Producers: Musicologo & Menes

Daddy Yankee singles chronology
"La Despedida" (2010)	"Ven Conmigo" (2011)	"Llegamos a la Disco" (2011)

Prince Royce singles chronology
"El Amor Que Perdimos" (2011)	"Ven Conmigo" (2011)	"Mi Última Carta" (2011)

"Ven Conmigo" (English: Come With Me) is the first official single by Puerto Rican reggaeton rapper Daddy Yankee featuring American bachata singer Prince Royce from Daddy Yankee's seventh studio album, Prestige (2012). The single was released to radios on April 13, 2011, and digitally on April 19, 2011. The song was produced by Musicologo and Menes. An English version that featured Daddy Yankee, Prince Royce, R&B/Latino singer Elijah King, Tony CJ & former 3LW & Cheetah Girl singer Adrienne Bailon has been released. received and award for "Urban Song of the Year" at the 2012 ASCAP Awards, which are awarded annually by the American Society of Composers, Authors and Publishers in the United States.

== Track listing ==
iTunes digital download

1. "Ven Conmigo" (feat. Prince Royce) – 3:39
2. "Ven Conmigo Dance Remix" (feat. Prince Royce) – 3:47
3. "Come With Me" (feat. Adrienne Bailon, Prince Royce, Elijah King, Tony CJ) – 3:37

== Music video ==
The music video for Ven Conmigo was released on June 3, 2011. It has more than 110 million hits on YouTube.

== Personnel ==
- Daddy Yankee: Vocals — Writer — Composer
- Prince Royce: Vocals — Writer — Composer
- Anthony López — Writer — Composer
- Los De La Nazza: Production
- Melvin Garica: Trumpet

== Charts ==
=== Weekly charts ===
Chart (2011)	Peak position
Mexican Pop Airplay (Billboard)	5
Mexican Airplay Chart (Billboard International)	23
Peru Airplay (UNIMPRO)	5
US Heatseekers Songs (Billboard)	24
US Hot Latin Songs (Billboard)	9
US Tropical Airplay (Billboard)	2
US Latin Rhythm Airplay (Billboard)	2
Venezuela Top Latino (Record Report)	19

=== Year-end charts ===
Chart (2011)	Position
US Hot Latin Songs (Billboard)	29
