= Leslie Grace =

American singer (born 1995)

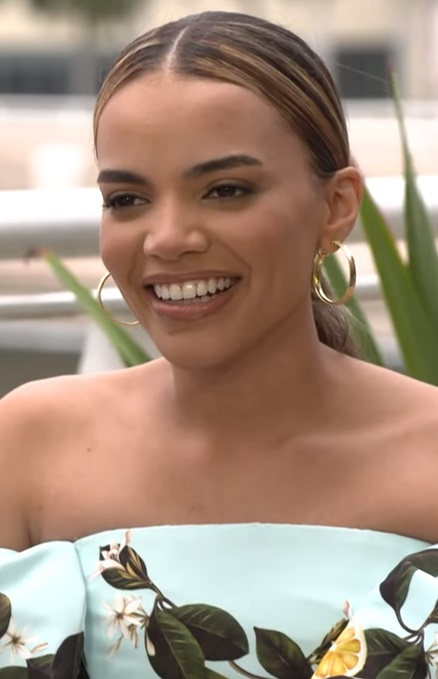
- Grace in 2021

Background information
- Born: Leslie Grace Martínez; January 7, 1995 (age 31); The Bronx, New York, U.S.
- Origin: Davie, Florida, U.S.
- Genres: Latin Pop; Bachata; R&B (brown-eyed soul); Soul
- Occupations: Singer; actress; model
- Instrument: Vocals
- Years active: 2009–present
- Labels: CD Baby; Top Stop (2012–2015); Sony Latin (2015–present)

Leslie Grace Martínez (born January 7, 1995) is an American singer and actress. For her work as a singer, she has received three Latin Grammy Award nominations. She starred as Nina Rosario in Jon M. Chu's film adaptation In the Heights (2021).

== Early life and education ==
Leslie Grace Martínez was born to Dominican parents on January 7, 1995, in The Bronx, a borough of New York City. Her mother runs a hair salon in South Florida. She was raised in Davie, Florida and attended Indian Ridge Middle School and Western High School, where she participated in musicals, talent shows, and choral performances. Singing and dancing from a young age, Grace entertained them along with her five older siblings since she was two. She speaks English and Spanish.

== Career ==
=== Music career ===
She recorded and released an independent Christian music album on CD Baby while in middle school. Her mainstream debut came with "Will You Still Love Me Tomorrow", a bilingual cover of the 1961 Shirelles hit. Her bachata-tinged rendition peaked at number one on both the Billboard Tropical Songs chart and Billboard Latin Airplay charts, making her the youngest female artist to do so. Her self-titled second studio album, Leslie Grace (2013), reached number four on the Billboard Latin Albums chart, and number three on the Billboard Tropical Albums chart.

Among her nominations are "Best Contemporary Tropical Album" at the 14th Annual Latin Grammy Awards (in which she sang along with the Zarkana cast of Cirque du Soleil), "Female Tropical Artist of the Year" and "Tropical Album of the Year" at the 26th Premio Lo Nuestro. In 2014 she also obtained nominations in the Billboard Awards in the categories of "New Artist of the Year" and "Hot Latin Songs, Artist of the Year, Female".

Among her tours abroad is her presentation on the Caribbean island of Curaçao at the North Sea Jazz Festival, and the tour of the United States with the musical director Rayner Marrero and several bachata musicians in 2013. She also performed on Sábado Gigante with Don Francisco, and at the Chile Telethon and at the closing of the same at the National Stadium of Chile, where she sang in front of approximately 60,000 people.

In mid-2016 she participated as captain of the Univision reality show Va por ti with Luis Coronel, Chiquis Rivera and the host Galilea Montijo. After releasing the single "Aire" with Maluma, they made a tour of 14 concerts through Mexico. In the same year she released the single "Nada de amor".

In January 2017 she collaborated with the duo Play-N-Skillz, Wisin and Frankie J in the reggaeton-style cover of Selena's song, "Si una vez". And in February of the same year she was nominated for the Premios Lo Nuestro in the category "Female Artist of the Year – Pop / Rock".

On April 12, 2018, her collaboration with Super Junior's "Lo Siento" was released on S.M. Entertainment's YouTube channel. "Lo Siento" won Best Collaboration at the 9th Nickelodeon Mexico Kids' Choice Awards. That year, she released the multi-platinum "Duro y Suave" with Noriel and featured on "Mi Mala (Remix)". Subsequent singles included "Sola" (2019), "Bachatica" (2021), "Un Buen Día" and "Como La Primera Vez!" (2022), "ayayay!" (2025), and "INMERECIDO" (2025), the latter previewing her next studio album.

=== Film career ===
On April 11, 2019, it was announced that Grace would be starring as Nina Rosario in the 2021 film adaptation of Lin-Manuel Miranda's Tony Award-winning musical In the Heights. The film originally set for a 2020 release date was postponed due to the COVID-19 pandemic. It was released the following summer in movie theatres and HBO Max simultaneously. The film received near universal acclaim with many citing it as one of the best films of the year. Grace received praise from critics including David Ehrlich from IndieWire who wrote that she "shined" in the role. K. Austin Collins of Rolling Stone wrote, "Its highest accomplishment is that it succeeds as the star vehicle Hollywood seemed to demand." On July 21, 2021, Grace was cast as Barbara Gordon/Batgirl in HBO Max's Batgirl. In August 2022, Warner Bros. Discovery cancelled plans to release the film, which was nearing completion.

In 2024, she played Yenny in Alessandra Lacorazza Samudio's In the Summers, which premiered at the Sundance Film Festival to critical acclaim, and Jimmie Sue in Elliott Lester's Western The Thicket. In May 2025, she was cast as Kate Acosta, a commercial diver swallowed by a sperm whale, in Felipe Vargas's survival thriller Propel. Upcoming projects include the Hulu series Untitled Onyx and the TV film Monopoly.

== Filmography ==
=== Films ===
Year	Title	Role	Notes	Ref.
2021	In the Heights	Nina Rosario		
2022	Batgirl	Barbara Gordon / Batgirl	Unreleased	
2024	In the Summers	Yenny		
2024	The Thicket	Jimmie Sue		
2026	Stages	Jessie Ramos		
2026	Campeón Gabacho	Irene		

== Discography ==
=== Studio albums ===
- Pasión (2009)
- Leslie Grace (2013)
- AMOR, QUIÉN ERES? (2026)

=== Extended plays ===
- Lloviendo Estrellas (2015)

=== Singles ===
As lead artist

List of singles as lead artist, with selected chart positions, showing year released and album name
Title	Year	Peak chart positions										Certifications	Album
Title	Year	US Latin	US Latin Airplay	US Latin Pop	US Trop.	ARG	CHI	ECU	ES	SPA	VEN	Certifications	Album
"Will You Still Love Me Tomorrow"	2012	3	1	3	1	—	—	—	—	—	—		Leslie Grace
"Day 1"	2012	21	23	12	1	—	—	—	—	—	—		Leslie Grace
"Be My Baby"	2013	8	2	6	6	—	—	—	—	—	—		Leslie Grace
"Odio No Odiarte"	2014	—	—	—	9	—	—	—	—	—	—		Leslie Grace
"Nadie Como Tú"	2014	—	—	—	11	—	—	—	—	—	—		Non-album singles
"Cómo Duele el Silencio"	2015	—	—	29	1	—	—	—	—	—	—		Lloviendo Estrellas
"Aire" (featuring Maluma)	2016	—	—	25	10	—	—	—	—	—	—		Non-album singles
"Nada de Amor"	2016	—	—	—	—	—	—	—	—	—	—		Non-album singles
"Díganle" (with Becky G and remixed with CNCO)	2017	36	—	30	—	34	—	53	—	—	39	RIAA: 2× Platinum (Latin); AMPROFON: Gold	Non-album singles
"Dulce" (with Wisin)	2017	—	—	—	—	—	—	—	—	—	—		Non-album singles
"Duro y Suave" (with Noriel)	2018	49	36	28	—	31	2	8	12	7	—	RIAA: 4× Platinum (Latin); AMPROFON: Platinum; PROMUSICAE: 3× Platinum	Non-album singles
"Fuego" (with MYA)	2018	—	—	—	—	90	—	—	—	—	—		Hoy
"De Lunes a Jueves" (with Farina)	2018	—	—	—	—	—	—	—	—	—	—		Non-album single
"Still New York" (with MAX featuring Joey Badass)	2018	—	—	—	—	—	—	—	—	—	—		Non-album single
"Sola" (featuring Justin Quiles and Play-N-Skillz)	2019	—	—	—	—	—	—	—	—	—	—		Non-album single
"Qué Será" (with Abraham Mateo)	2019	—	—	—	—	—	—	—	—	—	—		Non-album single
"Bachatica"	2021	—	—	—	10	—	—	—	—	—	—		Non-album single
"Un Buen Día"	2022	—	—	—	—	—	—	—	—	—	—		Non-album single
"Como La Primera Vez" (with Boza)	2022	—	—	—	—	—	—	—	—	—	—		Non-album single
"ayayay"	2025	—	—	—	—	—	—	—	—	—	—		Non-album single
"—" denotes a recording that did not chart or was not released in that territory.

As featured artist

List of singles as featured artist, with selected chart positions and certifications, showing year released and album name
Title	Year	Peak chart positions						Certifications	Album
Title	Year	US Latin	US Latin Airplay	US Latin Pop	ARG	COL	SPA	Certifications	Album
"Si Una Vez (If I Once)" (Play-N-Skillz featuring Frankie J, Wisin and Leslie Grace)	2016	22	34	15	—	—	—	RIAA: 4× Platinum (Latin)	Non-album single
"Mi Mala (Remix)" (Mau y Ricky and Karol G featuring Lali, Becky G and Leslie Grace)	2018	38	33	21	10	68	57	AMPROFON: Platinum+Gold; CAPIF: Gold; IFPI PER: 4× Platinum; PROMUSICAE: Gold; RIAA: 3× Platinum (Latin)	Para Aventuras y Curiosidades
"Lo Siento" (Super Junior featuring Leslie Grace and Play-N-Skillz)	2018	—	—	—	—	—	—		Replay
"Conga" (Remix) (Meek Mill featuring Leslie Grace and Boi-1da)	2021	—	—	—	—	—	—		Bacardi promotional single
"—" denotes a recording that did not chart or was not released in that territory.

== Awards and nominations ==
Lo Nuestro Awards

Year	Nominee / work	Award	Result
2013	Leslie Grace	Tropical Female Artist	Nominated
2014	Leslie Grace	Tropical Album	Nominated
2014	Leslie Grace	Tropical Female Artist	Nominated
2015	Leslie Grace	Tropical Female Artist	Nominated
2016	Leslie Grace	Tropical Female Artist	Won

Billboard Latin Music Awards

Year	Nominee / work	Award	Result
2013	Leslie Grace	Songs Artist of the Year	Nominated
2014	Leslie Grace	Artist of the Year Debut	Nominated
2014	Leslie Grace	Female Artist of the Year	Nominated

Latin Grammys

Year	Nominee / work	Award	Result
2013	Leslie Grace	Best Contemporary Tropical Album	Nominated
2015	Lloviendo Estrellas	Best Contemporary Tropical Album	Nominated
2015	"Como Duele el Silencio"	Best Tropical Song	Nominated

Nickelodeon Mexico Kids' Choice Awards

Bout	Year	Recipient	Award	Result	Ref.
9th	2018	"Lo Siento" – Super Junior feat. (Leslie Grace & Play-N-Skillz)	Best Collaboration	Won	
