= Soy el Mismo (Prince Royce album) =

Soy El Mismo

Studio album by Prince Royce
- Released: October 8, 2013
- Recorded: 2013
- Genres: Latin pop, bachata
- Length: 42:52 (standard version); 61:00 (deluxe version)
- Label: Sony Latin
- Producers: Prince Royce (also exec.); David Sonenberg (exec.); William Derella (exec.); Efraín "Junito" Dávila; D'Lesly "Dice" Lora; Robopop; Danny Parker; Ross Golan; Erik Madrid; Toby Gad; Fernando Garibay; Héctor Rubén Rivera; Robert Rosario; D'Lesly "Dice" Lora; Robopop; Danny Parker; Ross Golan; Erik Madrid; Toby Gad; Fernando Garibay; Héctor Rubén Rivera; Eduardo Aguilar

Prince Royce chronology
#1's (2012)	Soy El Mismo (2013)	Double Vision (2015)

Singles from Soy El Mismo
- 1. "Darte un Beso" Released: July 15, 2013; 2. "Te Robaré" Released: February 3, 2014; 3. "Nada" Released: March 28, 2014; 4. "Soy el Mismo" Released: August 8, 2014; 5. "Solita" Released: February 2015

Professional ratings
Review scores
Source	Rating
About.com	4.5/5 stars
AllMusic	4/5 stars

Soy El Mismo (transl. "I'm the Same") is the third studio album by American singer Prince Royce. The album was released on October 8, 2013, by Sony Music Latin and became Royce's third number 1 on the Billboard Top Latin Albums chart in the United States. With Soy el Mismo, Royce also reached a career-best peak of number 14 on the US Billboard 200.

At the Latin Grammy Awards of 2014, the album received a nomination for Best Contemporary Tropical Album, Royce's second career nomination in the category. Royce was then nominated for three awards at the 2014 Billboard Music Awards: Top Latin Artist, Top Latin Album, and Top Latin Song for "Darte un Beso". The latter won the award for Streaming Song of the Year at the 2014 Latin Billboard Music Awards.

== Singles ==
The album was preceded by the release of its lead single, "Darte un Beso", on July 15, 2013. The single became Royce's fourth to reach number-one on the Billboard Hot Latin Songs chart in the United States. "Darte un Beso" also reached number-one on multiple Latin music sub-charts in the US and was certified 3× Platinum (Latin) by the Recording Industry Association of America (RIAA). Four other singles were released to promote the album between 2014 and 2015: "Te Robaré", "Nada", the title track, and "Solita". The track "Te Regalo el Mar" was made available as an instant digital download with the iTunes Store pre-order of the album.

== Track listing ==
No.	Title	Writer(s)	Length
1.	"Soy el Mismo"	Geoffrey Rojas; Daniel Santacruz	3:43
2.	"Te Robaré"	Rojas; D'Lesly "Dice" Lora; Yonathan Then	3:39
3.	"Darte un Beso"	Rojas; Andrés Castro; Guianko Gómez; Juan Riveros	3:26
4.	"You Are Fire"	Ross Golan; Dan Omelio; Daniel Parker	3:27
5.	"Me Encanta"	Rojas; D'Lesly "Dice" Lora; Yonathan Then	4:54
6.	"Tu Príncipe"	Rojas; Santacruz	4:09
7.	"Already Missing You" (featuring Selena Gomez)	Rojas; Selena Gomez; Toby Gad; Makeba Riddick	3:41
8.	"Invisible"	Rojas; Santacruz	4:04
9.	"Kiss Kiss"	Fernando Garibay; Doug Mangdagi; Amanda Warner; Stephen Wrabel	3:44
10.	"Nada"	Rojas; Alberto J. Santos	4:02
11.	"Te Regalo el Mar"	Rojas; D'Lesly "Dice" Lora; Jean Rodriguez; Shanelli Rojas	4:03

Deluxe edition
No.	Title	Writer(s)	Length
12.	"Primera Vez"	Rojas; Guianko Gomez; Efrain "Junito" Davila	3:22
13.	"Solita"	Rojas	4:12
14.	"You Are the One" (Dedicada a Las Fans)	Rojas; Edgar Barrera; Andres Castro; Guianko Gomez	4:32
15.	"Para Llegar A Ti"	Rojas; Edgar Barrera; Guianko Gomez	3:07
16.	"Perdóname"	Rojas; Edwin Serrano; Toby Gad	3:23

== Charts ==
=== Weekly charts ===
Chart (2013)	Peak position
Mexican Albums (AMPROFON)	4
Spanish Albums (Promusicae)	84
US Billboard 200	14
US Top Latin Albums (Billboard)	1
US Tropical Albums (Billboard)	1
Venezuelan Albums (Recordland)	4

=== Year-end charts ===
Chart (2013)	Position
US Top Latin Albums (Billboard)	11

Chart (2014)	Position
US Top Latin Albums (Billboard)	8
US Tropical Albums (Billboard)	3

Chart (2015)	Position
US Top Latin Albums (Billboard)	37

Chart (2017)	Position
US Top Latin Albums (Billboard)	42

== Certifications ==
Region	Certification	Certified units/sales
Mexico (AMPROFON)	2× Platinum	120,000^{‡}
United States (RIAA)	8× Platinum (Latin)	480,000^{‡}
^{‡} Sales+streaming figures based on certification alone.
