= Solita (Prince Royce song) =

Single by Prince Royce

from the album Soy el Mismo (Deluxe edition)
- Released: February 2015
- Genre: Bachata
- Length: 4:12
- Label: Sony Music Latin
- Songwriter(s): Geoffrey Rojas

Prince Royce singles chronology
"Stuck on a Feeling" (2014)	"Solita" (2015)	"Que Cosas Tiene el Amor" (2015)

"Solita" (transl. "Alone") is a 2014 bachata song by American recording artist Prince Royce. The song was released in February 2015 as a single lifted from the deluxe edition of Royce's third studio album, Soy el Mismo (2013).

== Chart performance ==
Chart (2015)	Peak position
US Hot Latin Songs (Billboard)	6
US Latin Airplay (Billboard)	4
US Tropical Airplay (Billboard)	1
