= Double Vision (Prince Royce album) =

Studio album by Prince Royce
- Released: July 24, 2015
- Recorded: 2014–15
- Genres: Pop; R&B; EDM
- Length: 44:04 (standard edition); 57:51 (deluxe edition); 63:35 (Japanese edition)
- Label: RCA
- Producers: Jason Evigan; Robopop; Ian Kirkpatrick; Toby Gad; The Cataracs; ShonuFF; Rune Westberg; RedOne; T.I Jakke; Hardwork; Rob Knox; Steve Mostyn; Alex Niceforo; RoccStar; Chaz Jackson; Young Yonny; Orlando Williamson; Pop & Oak; Flippa; Dominic Gordon

Prince Royce chronology
| Soy el Mismo (2013) | Double Vision (2015) | Five (2017) |

Singles from Double Vision
- 1. "Stuck on a Feeling" Released: November 24, 2014; 2. "Back It Up" Released: May 4, 2015

Double Vision is the fourth studio album by American singer Prince Royce; it was released on July 24, 2015, by RCA Records. It is Royce's first album to be recorded primarily in English.

Way ahead of the album's release, on November 24, 2014, Royce released "Stuck on a Feeling" (featuring Snoop Dogg) as the first single from the album. The single is Royce's best-charting single in the United States to date, having reached number forty-three on the Billboard Hot 100 singles chart.

The album was also preceded by its second single, "Back It Up" (featuring Jennifer Lopez and Pitbull), which was released in May 2015. The single reached number ten on the US Latin Pop Songs chart, number nineteen on the US Hot Latin Songs chart, and number ninety-two on the Billboard Hot 100. The Spanish-language version of the song was nominated for the Latin Grammy Award for Best Urban Song at the 2015 ceremony, making Royce an eight-time Latin Grammy-nominated performer.

== Background ==
While speaking about recording an English only album, Royce said; "It's not impossible, but I think it's unfair sometimes when you see an album that has five songs in English, five songs in Spanish. I think that I prefer to do separate albums for each. Definitely my intention is never to leave Latin music; I have a core audience there. But this English album is something brand new, like getting a new toy for Christmas. I'm getting the same feeling I got when I released my very first album, so I'm kinda just looking forward to having fun and doing both from here on out."

== Reception ==
Dennis Leopold from Rolling Stone gave the album 2.5 out of 5, saying "On his English-language debut, Latin superstar Prince Royce aims to prove himself the crossover heir to Ricky Martin and Enrique Iglesias... but Double Vision lacks focus, failing to establish a clear identity for Royce: He morphs from a version of Jason Derulo to Drake to Bruno Mars." adding "His voice is malleable enough, but he stands out most when he goes back to his roots. "There for You" floats along a tropical, guitar-laced groove, and "Lucky One" is all bachata sweetness, guaranteed to make the girls swoon."

Chuck Campbell of Knox News gave the album 3.5 out of 5, saying; "While Double Vision isn't a bold statement, it seamlessly eases Royce into the wider English-language pop market, a crisply produced modern album with dance songs, ballads and moderate amounts of Latin flavor. His voice is fairly distinctive with a wide enough range to help him navigate acoustic-rooted, swoon-worthy ballads like “Lucky One” and “Extraordinary,” soulful enough for the R&B-inflected cuts such as the sensual “Stuck on a Feeling” and glossy “Dangerous” and exotic enough to straddle the woozy electronic swagger of “Handcuffs” and tropical bluster of “Seal It With a Kiss.”

== Track listing ==
Double Vision – Standard edition
| No. | Title | Writer(s) | Producer(s) | Length |
|---|---|---|---|---|
| 1. | "Stuck on a Feeling" (featuring Snoop Dogg) | Jason Evigan; Daniel Omelio; Ross Golan; Sam Martin; Ammar Malik; Daron Jones; Michael Keith; Jason Boyd; Calvin Broadus, Jr. | Evigan; Robopop^{[a]}; Mitch Allan^{[b]}; Dan Book^{[c]} | 3:30 |
| 2. | "Handcuffs" | Geoffrey Rojas; Evigan; Ian Kirkpatrick; Lindy Robbins | Evigan; Kirkpatrick^{[e]} | 3:41 |
| 3. | "Back It Up" (featuring Jennifer Lopez and Pitbull) | Rojas; Armando Perez; Savan Kotecha; Ilya Salmanzadeh | Ilya; Noah Passovoy^{[b]}; Rune Westberg^{[c]} | 3:20 |
| 4. | "Lucky One" | Rojas; Nasri Atweh; Toby Gad | Gad | 3:57 |
| 5. | "Double Vision" (featuring Tyga) | Evigan; Golan; Malik; Jacob Kasher Hindlin; Michael Stevenson | Evigan | 3:35 |
| 6. | "Lie to Me" | Rojas; Niles Hollowell-Dhar; Taylor Parks; Wayne Hector; Freddy Wexler; Dave Kuncio | The Cataracs; Parks^{[b]} | 2:46 |
| 7. | "Dangerous" (featuring Kid Ink) | Rojas; Brian Collins; Shomari Wilson; Marc "E. Bassy" Griffin; Murphy Holmes; Yusuf Ali | ShonuFF; Oak Felder^{[b]} | 3:50 |
| 8. | "Extraordinary" | Rojas; Westberg | Westberg | 3:24 |
| 9. | "Seal It With a Kiss" | Rojas; Nadir Khayat; Talay Riley; Jakob Erixson | RedOne; T.I Jakke | 3:36 |
| 10. | "There for You" | Rojas; Philip Constable; Brandon Hesson; Dominic Gordon; Jirou Williams | Hardwork; Hesson^{[b]} | 3:44 |
| 11. | "Paris on a Sunny Day" | Rojas; Parks; Robin Tadross; Ely Rise | Rob Knox; Parks^{[b]} | 5:07 |
| 12. | "Chemical" | Rojas; Bassy; Steve Mostyn; Alex Niceforo; Trevor Case | Mostyn; Niceforo; Oak^{[b]} | 3:34 |
| Total length: | | | | 44:04 |

Double Vision – Deluxe edition (bonus tracks)
| No. | Title | Writer(s) | Producer(s) | Length |
|---|---|---|---|---|
| 13. | "Lay You Down" | Rojas; Constable; Lindsay Gilbert; Roark Bailey; Víctor Daniel | Hardwork; Gilbert^{[b]} | 3:26 |
| 14. | "With You" | Rojas; Leon Youngblood; Chaz Jackson; Orlando Williamson; Kris Stephens; Michael Jiminez; Terence Coles | RoccStar; Jackson^{[e]}; Williamson^{Tha Aristocrats [e]} | 3:14 |
| 15. | "Getaway" | Rojas; Mostyn; Kalenna Harper; Andrew "Pop" Wansel; Warren "Oak" Felder; Ronald Colson; Anthony Vick | Pop & Oak; Flippa; Mostyn | 3:26 |
| 16. | "End of My World" | Rojas; Gordon; Parks; Jamaica Smith | Gordon; Kahn-Cept^{[b]} | 3:41 |
| Total length: | | | | 57:51 |

Double Vision – Japanese edition (bonus track)
| No. | Title | Writer(s) | Producer(s) | Length |
|---|---|---|---|---|
| 17. | "Favorite Stranger" | Rojas; Mostyn; Parks; Felder; Smith | Mostyn; Parks^{[b]} | 3:16 |
| 18. | "Jukebox" | Rojas; Parks; Ronald Ferebee; Earl Johnson | Yonny; Parks^{[b]} | 2:28 |
| Total length: | | | | 1:03:35 |

Notes

- ^{^[a]} signifies an additional producer.
- ^{^[b]} signifies a vocal producer.
- ^{^[c]} signifies an additional vocal producer.
- ^{^[d]} signifies an executive producer.
- ^{^[e]} signifies a co-producer.

== Charts ==
| Chart (2015) | Peak position |
|---|---|
| Mexican Albums Chart | 39 |
| US Billboard 200 | 21 |

== Certifications ==
| Region | Certification | Certified units/sales |
|---|---|---|
| United States (RIAA) | 2× Platinum (Latin) | 120,000^{‡} |
^{‡} Sales+streaming figures based on certification alone.

== Release history ==
List of release dates, showing region, versions, formats, labels, and references
| Region | Date | Version | Format | Label |
|---|---|---|---|---|
| Worldwide | July 24, 2015 | Standard; deluxe | CD; digital download | RCA; Sony Music |
| Japan | September 23, 2015 | Deluxe | CD; digital download | Sony Music Japan |
