= Darte un Beso =

2014 single by Prince Royce

Single by Prince Royce

from the album Soy el Mismo
- Released: July 15, 2013
- Genre: Bachata; reggae-pop
- Length: 3:26
- Label: Sony Latin
- Songwriters: Geoffrey Rojas; Anthony López; Andrés Castro; Guianko Gómez; Juan Riveros; Eduardo Aguilar

Prince Royce singles chronology
"Te Perdiste Mi Amor" (2013)	"Darte un Beso" (2013)	"Te Robaré" (2014)

Music video
- "Darte un Beso" on YouTube

"Darte un Beso" (transl. "Give You a Kiss") is a 2013 bachata song by American singer Prince Royce. The single became an international hit for Prince Royce in the United States, Latin America and Spain. At the Latin Grammy Awards of 2014, the song received three nominations including Song of the Year, Record of the Year, and Best Tropical Song. It is also recognized as one of Prince Royce's signature songs. A 2014 Portuguese-language sertanejo version was made as "Te Dar um Beijo" with Brazilian musician Michel Teló featuring Prince Royce becoming a hit in its own right in Brazil.

== Music video ==
The music video was released late August 2013. In a beach, Royce falls in love for a young woman and sings to her about how he feels. The video ends with the woman turning out to be a mermaid. The song reached number one on multiple Billboard Latin music charts. As of February 2025, the video has received over 1.5 billion views on YouTube.

== Te Dar um Beijo ==
"Te Dar um Beijo"

Single by Michel Teló featuring Prince Royce
- Released: May 19, 2014
- Genre: Música sertaneja
- Length: 3:02
- Label: Som Livre
- Songwriter: Geoffrey Rojas

Michel Teló singles chronology
"Levemente Alterado" (2013)	"Te Dar um Beijo" (2014)

Prince Royce singles chronology
"Nada" (2014)	"Te Dar um Beijo" (2014)	"Soy el Mismo" (2014)

Music video
- "Te Dar um Beijo" on YouTube

In 2014, Royce and Brazilian musician Michel Teló recorded a Portuguese-language version in sertanejo under the title "Te Dar Um Beijo".

For marketing purposes outside Brazil, this Portuguese language version was launched initially as Prince Royce featuring Michel Teló on April 24, 2014, and for promotion within Brazil as Teló featuring Royce on May 19, 2014.

In a report in Billboard, the collaboration came together when Telo reached out to Royce's camp because he wanted to record "Darte un Beso" in Portuguese. Royce said: "They sent me a rough demo and I said, 'why don't we just do it together?'".

== Chart performance ==
=== Weekly charts ===
Weekly chart performance for Darte un Beso
Chart (2013)	Peak position
Colombia (National-Report)	1
Dominican Republic (Monitor Latino)	1
Mexico (Billboard Mexican Airplay)	1
Mexico (Monitor Latino)	11
Spain (PROMUSICAE)	42
US Billboard Hot 100	78
US Heatseeker Songs (Billboard)	6
US Hot Latin Songs (Billboard)	1
US Latin Airplay (Billboard)	1
US Latin Pop Airplay (Billboard)	1
US Tropical Airplay (Billboard)	1
Venezuela (Record Report)	48

Weekly chart performance for Te Dar um Beijo
Chart (2014)	Peak position
Brazil (Billboard Brasil Hot 100); Portuguese version: "Te Dar Um Beijo" by Michel Teló featuring Prince Royce	5

=== Year-end charts ===
Year-end chart performance for Darte un Beso
Chart (2013)	Position
US Hot Latin Songs (Billboard)	3
Chart (2014)	Position
US Hot Latin Songs (Billboard)	6

=== Decade-end charts ===
Decade-end charts performance for Darte un Beso
Chart (2010–2019)	Position
US Hot Latin Songs (Billboard)	12

=== All-time charts ===
Chart (2021)	Position
US Hot Latin Songs (Billboard)	28

== Certifications ==
Region	Certification	Certified units/sales
Canada (Music Canada)	Gold	40,000^{‡}
Italy (FIMI)	Platinum	50,000^{‡}
Mexico (AMPROFON)	Diamond+4× Platinum+Gold	570,000^{‡}
Spain (Promusicae)	2× Platinum	120,000^{‡}
United States (RIAA)	31× Platinum (Latin)	1,860,000^{‡}
Streaming
Spain (Promusicae)	Platinum	8,000,000^{†}
^{‡} Sales+streaming figures based on certification alone.^{†} Streaming-only figures based on certification alone.

== Awards and nominations ==
Year	Award	Category	Nominated	Result
2014	Premios Tu Mundo	Most Popular Song of the Year	Prince Royce	Won

== See also ==
- List of Billboard number-one Latin songs of 2013
- List of Billboard number-one Latin songs of 2014
