= Top Stop Music =

- Founded: 2009
- Founder: Sergio George
- Distributor(s): Sony Music Entertainment, Atlantic Records Group
- Genre: Salsa, merengue, bachata
- Country of origin: U.S.
- Location: Delray Beach, Florida
- Official website: topstopmusic.com

Top Stop Music is an independent record label founded by Puerto Rican producer, Sergio George in 2009 based in Delray Beach, Florida.

== History ==
Sergio George was known for producing albums for salsa musicians during his work with RMM Records & Video during the 1990s. Following the purchase of RMM Records in 2001, George left the company to pursue his own independent record. The record's first album, Ciclos by Luis Enrique received a Latin Grammy Award for Best Salsa Album in 2009. The lead single, "Yo No Sé Mañana" was also given a Latin Grammy Award for "Tropical Song of the Year". La India, who worked with George in the past, released her album Unica which reached number one on the Tropical Album charts. Prince Royce, a bachata musician, recorded his own version of "Stand by Me" which peaked at number one on the Tropical Airplay charts. BKidz, a group formed by George, recorded a salsa version of Jackson 5's "ABC".

== Roster ==
- Charlie Aponte
- La India
- Gabriella Munoz
- Salsa Giants

== Former ==
- Leslie Grace
- Toby Love
- Tito Nieves
- Eli Jas
- JAZ Cumbia
- Magic Juan
- Jonathan Moly
- Pee Wee
- Prince Royce
- Valentino
- Jorge Villamizar
- Charlie Zaa
- Ziko
