= 2017 in Latin music =

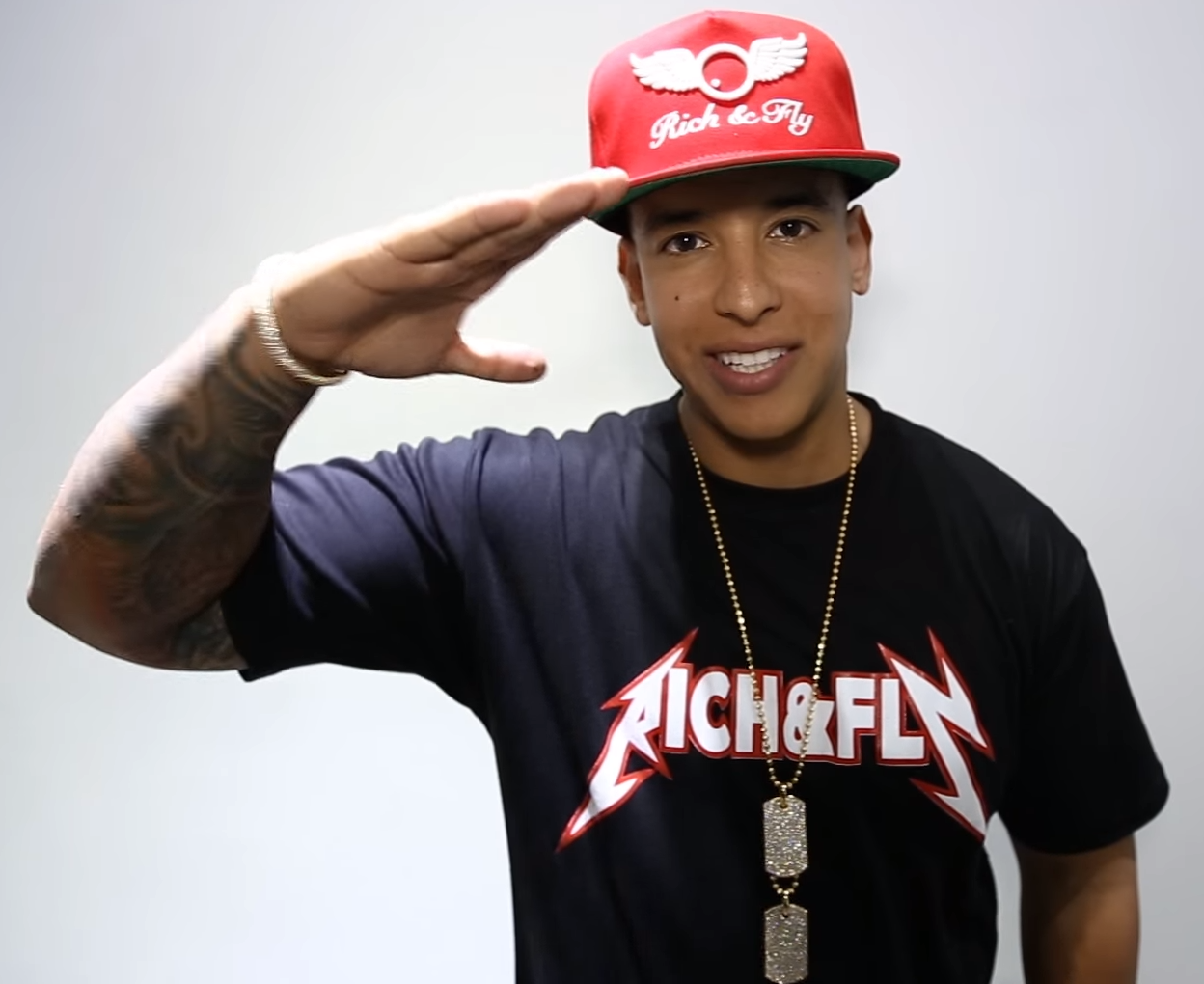
Puerto Rican rapper and singer Daddy Yankee was named Top Latin Artist of the Year in the United States by Billboard.

This is a list of notable events in Latin music (music from Spanish- and Portuguese-speaking regions of Latin America, Latin Europe, and the United States) that took place in 2017.

== Events ==
=== January–March ===
- January 5 – Gerardo Ortiz breaks the record for most number ones by a solo artist on the Billboard Regional Mexican Songs chart. The singer placed his eight number one "Regresa Hermosa" on the January 14-dated chart, breaking the tie with Vicente Fernandez.
- January 6 – In their annual report, Nielsen Soundscan found that overall sales of Latin albums and digitally purchased songs decreased compared to their previous report despite a strong increase in music streaming. With the continuing pattern of increased music streams, Latin music as a whole increased by 13.6% compared to 2015, thus making Latin music the third major genre in year-over-year growth following R&B and holiday music. The report also notes the discrepancy in musical styles between the bestselling Latin albums and singles of the year.
- January 12 – Billboard updates the methodology for the Tropical Airplay chart to track airplay of tropical from Spanish-language radio stations Previously, the Tropical Airplay ranked the most-played songs on tropical radio stations of any genre.
- January 24 – Alejandro Fernández's management team files a lawsuit against fellow Mexican singer Luis Miguel in breach of a contract and not paying back the money given to Miguel for the canceled tour that was set to launch last year.
- January 31 – Beginning with the February 11-dated chart, Billboard's Top Latin Albums, Latin Pop Albums, Regional Mexican Albums, and its Tropical Albums charts allowed catalog entry into their respective genre-specific charts; a ban the company held for over a decade.
- February 23 – The 29th Annual Lo Nuestro Awards are held at the American Airlines Arena in Miami, Florida. Major winners include CNCO, Carlos Vives, Shakira and J Balvin.
- March 15 – The 25th Annual ASCAP Latin Awards are held at the Condado Vanderbilt Hotel in San Juan, Puerto Rico. "Duele el Corazón" by Enrique Iglesias featuring Wisin is named Song of the Year while Joss Favela is recognized as Composer of the Year and Daddy Yankee receives the Composer/Artist of the Year award. Puerto Rican salsa group El Gran Combo de Puerto Rico receives the Latin Heritage Award and Puerto Rican-American rapper Vico C receives the Vanguard Award.
- March 22 – The 24th BMI Latin Awards are held at the Beverly Wilshire Hotel in Beverly Hill California. "Ginza" by J Balvin is named Contemporary Latin Song of the Year while Gocho and Motiff are recognized as Contemporary Latin Songwriters of the Year. Mexican-American group Los Lobos receives the Icon Award.

=== April–June ===
- April 24 – The Recording Industry Association of America (RIAA) reports growth in revenue in the Latin music industry in the United States for the first time since 2005. The growth is attributed to the rise of streaming audio.
- April 27 – The Billboard Latin Music Awards of 2017 take place at the Ritz Carlton in Miami, Florida. Reggaeton musician Nicky Jam is the biggest winner, with six awards.
- May 2 – Mexican singer Luis Miguel is arrested by US marshals for not paying his former manager William Brockhaus over one million dollars following a court order in July 2016.
- May 5 – For the first time since George W. Bush initiated the annual Cinco de Mayo event in 2001, no musician attends the event in Washington D.C. President Donald Trump does not attend the event, becoming the first president to not host the event. The event is instead hosted by Vice President Mike Pence.
- May 13 – Portugal wins the Eurovision Song Contest 2017 – the country's first win since it began participating in 1964. It is the first winning song performed in a country's native language since Serbia's "Molitva" in 2007, and the first ever in Portuguese.
- May 15 – "Despacito" by Luis Fonsi and Daddy Yankee becomes the first mostly Spanish-language song to top the Billboard Hot 100 chart in the United States since "Macarena" by Los del Río" in 1996. The success of the song is propelled by Justin Bieber's remix of the song. The song's commercial success renews interest in the Latin music market from recording labels in the United States.

=== July–December ===
- July 9 – Daddy Yankee becomes the most listened-to artist worldwide on streaming service Spotify, being the first Latin artist to do so.
- July 31 – Spanish writer Daniela Bose, writes on the disparity of women in Spanish music on Spain's music charts. Her report found that consumers replaced Latin pop and Spanish music with reggaeton and trap music; genres that belittle women with lyrics that speak of adulterous acts.
- September 19 – The Latin Recording Academy postpones the announcement of the nominations for the 18th Annual Latin Grammy Awards due to the earthquake in Mexico which occurred a day before nominations were to be revealed as well as other natural disasters affecting Spanish-speaking communities.
- November 16 – The 18th Annual Latin Grammy Awards are held at the MGM Grand Garden Arena in Las Vegas, Nevada.
  - "Despacito" by Luis Fonsi and Daddy Yankee wins the Latin Grammy Awards for Record of the Year and Song of the Year.
  - Salsa Big Band by Rubén Blades and Roberto Delgado & Orquesta wins the Latin Grammy Award for Album of the Year.
  - Vicente García wins Best New Artist.

== Number-one albums and singles by country ==
- List of number-one hits of 2017 (Argentina)
- List of Hot 100 number-one singles of 2017 (Brazil)
- List of number-one songs of 2017 (Colombia)
- List of number-one albums of 2017 (Mexico)
- List of number-one songs of 2017 (Mexico)
- List of number-one albums of 2017 (Portugal)
- List of number-one albums of 2017 (Spain)
- List of number-one singles of 2017 (Spain)
- List of number-one Billboard Latin Albums from the 2010s
- List of number-one Billboard Hot Latin Songs of 2017
- List of number-one singles of 2017 (Venezuela)

== Awards ==
- 2017 Premio Lo Nuestro
- 2017 Billboard Latin Music Awards
- 2017 Latin American Music Awards
- 2017 Latin Grammy Awards
- 2017 Heat Latin Music Awards
- 2017 MTV Millennial Awards

== Albums released ==
=== First quarter ===
==== January ====
Day	Title	Artist	Genre(s)	Singles	Label
6	Gallo Fino	Leonardo Aguilar			Machín Records
13	Directo en El Círculo Flamenco de Madrid	Tomasa La Macanita and Manuel Valencia			
20	Fénix	Nicky Jam	Reggaeton	"El Perdón" "Hasta el Amanecer" "Por el Momento" "El Amante" "Si Tú la Ves"	La Industria Inc.
20	The Beginning	Kevin Roldán	Reggaeton		Universal Music Latino
27	Mr. EP - A Tribute to Eddie Palmieri	Charlie Sepúlveda & The Turnaround	Latin Jazz		HighNote Records, Inc.
27	Acenda A Sua Luz	Aline Barros	Gospel		MK Music

==== February ====
Day	Title	Artist	Genre(s)	Singles	Label
1	Mutante	Daniel Cadena			
3	Louder!	Sofía Reyes		"Muévelo" "Conmigo (Rest of Your Life)" "Solo Yo" "Llegaste Tú"	Warner Music Latina
3	Gente Valiente	Silvestre Dangond	Vallenato, Reggaeton	"Ya No Me Duele Más" "Cásate Conmigo"	Sony Music Latin
3	Albita	Albita	Afro-Cuban		Innercat Music Group
3	Serio	Lil Supa			
10	Los ángeles	Rosalía	Flamenco	"Catalina" "Aunque es de noche"	Universal
10	Rompiendo Fronteras	Alejandro Fernández		"Quiero Que Vuelvas" "Sé Que Te Duele"	Universal Music Latino, Universal Music Latino
10	Real G4 Life, Vol. 3	Ñengo Flow	Reggaeton		Real G4 Life, Inc.
10	Típico	Miguel Zenón			Song X Jazz
12	Pero No Llorando - Nocturna	Majida Issa			
14	Tsunami Is Back	Jadiel	Reggaeton		Tsunami Records
17	Ya Me Vi Contigo	Grupo H-100			
17	Rap Komunion	Arianna Puello			
24	Five	Prince Royce	Bachata	"Culpa al Corazón" "La Carretera" "Moneda" "Deja Vu"	Sony Music Latin
24	Como No Queriendo	Banda Carnaval	Ranchera		Disa, Andaluz Music, Universal Music Latin Entertainment
24	Aún Estoy de Pie	Mariachi Imperial Azteca			
24	El Paradise	Los Amigos Invisibles			Gozadera Records
24	Memoria de Los Sentidos	Vicente Amigo	Flamenco		Sony Music
25	Bajo Mundo	Oskar Cartaya	Latin Jazz		Bajo Mundo Music

==== March ====
Day	Title	Artist	Genre(s)	Singles	Label
2	Flora y Faῦna	Camila Luna			
3	To Beny Moré With Love	Jon Secada featuring The Charlie Sepúlveda Big Band			BMG, Peermusic
3	Palabras Manuales	Danay Suárez	Latin, Dubstep		Universal Music Group
3	(...)	Day & Lara			
3	Memórias	Eli Soares	Gospel		Universal Music Christian Group
3	Na Medida Do Impossível Ao Vivo No Inhotim	Fernanda Takai	MPB		Deck
3	Três no Samba	André Mehmari, Eliane Faria and Gordinho do Surdo	Samba		Selo SESC SP
6	Realidade ao vivo em Manaus	Marília Mendonça			Vidisco, Som Livre
10	DM	Dulce María	Ballad	"No Sé Llorar" "Volvamos" "Rompecorazones"	Universal Music Group
10	No Estás Tú	José Manuel Figueroa			Fonovisa Records
10	Lo Niego Todo	Joaquín Sabina			Sony Music
11	Aguas	Mula			
17	Isidro Infante Presenta: Cuba y Puerto Rico, Un Abrazo Musical Salsero	Various artists			
23	Tamborazo los Viejitos	Marco Flores y La Jerez	Banda		MF
24	50 Palos	Jarabe de Palo	Latin pop, rock		Tronco
24	Dance of Time	Eliane Elias	Latin jazz		Concord Jazz
24	Primera Fila	Bronco	Norteño		Sony Music Mexico
27	DNA Musical	Alexandre Pires	MPB		Som Livre
31	Residente	Residente	Alternative hip hop, urban, world	"Somos Anormales" "Desencuentro"	FMG, Univision Communications, Sony Music Latin
31	Confío	Jaci Velasquez	Latin Christian		Integrity Music
31	Clase de Historia	Voz de Mando	Regional Mexican		Talento Lider
31	Alma Bohemia	Los Huracanes del Norte	Norteño		Garmex
31	Obras Son Amores	Antonio Carmona			Universal Music Group
31	Gran Ciudad	Debi Nova			Sony Music Latin

=== Second quarter ===
==== April ====
Day	Title	Artist	Genre(s)	Singles	Label
5	Alta Gracia	Nathalie Peña Comas	Classical		Rechord Sounds
7	Hecho en México	Javier Rosas y Su Artilleria Pesada	Regional Mexican		Fonovisa
7	Hybrido / From Rio To Wayne Shorter	Antonio Adolfo	Latin jazz		AAM Music
7	El Protagonista	Andino	Reggaeton	"Cuando Se Prende" "Pide Calle"	MPB Records
8	Queridos (En Vivo)	Luis Pescetti	Children's		LMP
10	Solo Buenos Aires	Fernando Otero	Tango		Rycy Productions
12	Joined	Cesar Camargo Mariano featuring Rudiger Liebermann, Walter Seyfarth & Benoit Fromanger			Clef, Pra Produções
14	La Mejor Versión De Mí	Banda Sinaloense MS de Sergio Lizarraga	Regional Mexican		Lizos Music
14	Lo Único Constante	Alex Cuba			Caracol
14	Momentos	Alex Campos	Latin Christian, Regional Mexican		Sony Music Mexico
17	36 Aniversario Mariachi Oro de América	Mariachi Oro de América	Mariachi		Elith
18	Bidimensional	Guaco	Tropical		Producciones Guaqueros
20	Zanna	Zanna	MPB		Zanna Agencia De Som
20	Tanguedia	Gabriela Bergallo			
21	Circo Soledad	Ricardo Arjona	Latin pop		Metamorfosis
21	Enamorada con Banda	Lucero	Banda	"Hasta Que Amanezca"	Fonovisa
21	Fuerte	Miranda!	Latin pop, rock		Sony Music Argentina
21	Porrock	Adriana Lucía	Tropical fusion		Sony Music Argentina
21	Dos Navegantes	Edu Lobo, Romero Lubambo, Mauro Senise	MPB		Biscoito Fino
21	Canta O Nordeste	Trio Nordestino	Brazilian roots		Biscoito Fino
28	Una Vida	Ednita Nazario	Latin pop		Sony Music Latin
28	El Eco de Tu Voz	Hillsong En Español	Latin Christian		Hillsong Music
28	La Trenza	Mon Laferte	Latin pop, Latin alternative	"Amárrame" "Mi buen amor" "Primaveral"	Universal Music, Discos Valiente
28	Amar y Vivir (En Vivo Desde La Ciudad de México, 2017)	La Santa Cecilia	Latin pop		Universal Music, Rebeleon
29	Salsa Big Band	Rubén Blades and Roberto Delgado & Orquesta	Salsa		Rubén Blades Productions
30	Cumbia Del Río Magdalena	Juventino Ojito and Su Son Mocaná	Cumbia		Fundación Cuarto Verde

==== May ====
Day	Title	Artist	Genre(s)	Singles	Label
4	An Open Book - 25 Preludes For Piano & Orchestra	Jorge Mejia	Classical		Sony Music Latin, Infusion
5	Non-Stop: Mexico To Jamaica	Ozomatli	Reggae		Cleopatra
5	Musas (Un Homenaje Al Folclore Latinoamericano En Manos De Los Macorinos, Vol. 1)	Natalia Lafourcade and Los Macorinos	Folk music	"Tú sí sabes quererme"	Sony Music Mexico
5	Jei Beibi	Café Tacuba	Latin pop, rock	"Futuro"	Cafe Tacvba
5	Teatro	Lucas Arnau	Tropical		Arnau Music
5	Olga Tañón y Punto.	Olga Tañón	Tropical fusion		Mia Musa, Sony Music Latin
5	Clareou	Padre Fábio de Melo	Latin Christian		Sony Music Brasil
12	Mis Planes Son Para Amarte	Juanes	Latin pop	"Fuego"	Universal Music Latino
12	Ni Diablo Ni Santo	Julión Álvarez y Su Norteño Banda	Regional Mexican		Universal Music Latin Entertainment
12	Ayer y Hoy	Banda El Recodo de Cruz Lizarraga	Banda		Fonovisa, Universal
12	Apocalipsis Zombi	Cuarteto de Nos	Latin alternative		Sony Music Argentina
12	Incomparável	Bruna Karla	Latin Christian		MK Music
12	Arrieros Somos – Sesiones Acústicas	Aida Cuevas	Regional Mexican		Cuevas
15	Contra Corriente	Gabriel	Tropical fusion		The United Talent Factory
15	Textures from the North of South	In-Hong Cha and Venezuela Symphony Orchestra	Classical		Interactive Line Producciones Y Media
16	Nuestra Herencia	Mariachi Herencia de México	Mariachi		Mariachi Heritage Foundation
16	Pa' Qué Más (Colombian Andean Music)	Quinteto Leopoldo Federico	Folk		Hoot, Wisdom Recordings
19	En Vivo: Auditorio Telmex	Calibre 50	Regional Mexican		Calibre, Universal
19	Encuentranos Espiritu Santo	New Wine	Latin Christian		Ministerio Internacional El Rey Jesus
19	El Hombre Sin Sombra	Mikel Erentxun	Latin pop, rock		Warner Music Spain
19	Piano e Voz, Amigos e Pertences 2	Paulo César Baruk and Leandro Rodrigues	Latin Christian		Musile
19	Ni Un Paso Atrás	Jorge Celedón and Sergio Luis Rodríguez	Vallenato		Independiente
21	Tatuajes	Erika Ender			Endertainment Publishing & Productions
23	El Orisha De La Rosa	Magín Díaz			Noname
23	Tu Amor	Gabriela Cartulano	Latin Christian		Gabriela Cartulano
26	El Dorado	Shakira	Latin pop	"Chantaje" "Me Enamoré" "Perro Fiel" "Trap"	Sony Music Latin
26	Necesito una Compañera	Jonatán Sánchez	Regional Mexican		Gerencia 360 Music
26	Celebración	Charlie Zaa	Tropical, bolero		Columbia
26	Extended Play Yatra	Sebastián Yatra	Latin pop		Universal Music Latino
26	Salón, Lágrimas y Deseo	Lila Downs	Latin pop		Sony Music Mexico
26	Tributo a La Salsa Colombiana 7	Alberto Barros	Salsa		Barros Production, Fonovisa
26	Las Caras Lindas	Flor de Toloache	Mariachi		Chulo
26	Conversations with Vladimir Stowe	Gustavo Casenave			Fula
26	Marc Anthony for Babies	Various artists	Children's		Magnus Music
30	Aprendendo Ritmos da América	Sophia	Children's		Nb Music
Unknown	ADN	Alain Pérez	Salsa		EGREM

==== June ====
Day	Title	Artist	Genre(s)	Singles	Label
2	Calle Linda 2	Pirulo y La Tribu	Tropical		JP Entertainment, UNiversal
2	Boca	Curumim	Rock		Natura Musical
2	Suenan los Alarmas	No Te Va Gustar	Rock en español		Popart Discos, Sony Music
9	Pirombeira	Pirombeira			Independente
9	Jazz Tango	Pablo Ziegler Trio	Latin jazz		ZOHO Music
9	Amor Supremo Desnudo	Carla Morrison	Latin pop		Carla Morrison Musica, Cosmica
16	Sin Límites	El Gran Martín Elías and Rolando Ochoa	Vallenato		Sony Music
16	Cosmovisiones	Comisario Pantera	Pop rock		Discos Valiente, EMI Mexico
22	La Síntesis O'Konnor	Él Mató a un Policia Motorizado	Rock en español		Laptra
23	Comeré Callado Vol. 1: Con Norteno, Tuba y Guitarras	Gerardo Ortiz	Regional Mexican		Sony Music Latin
23	Versus	Alejandra Guzman and Gloria Trevi	Latin pop	"Cuando un Hombre Te Enamora"	Universal Music Latino
23	Sentimento De Mulher	Solange Almeida	Música sertaneja		Sony Music Brasil
23	Dois Tempos, Parte 2	Zezé Di Camargo & Luciano	Música sertaneja		Sony Music Brasil

=== Third quarter ===
==== July ====
Day	Title	Artist	Genre(s)	Singles	Label
4	Otras Historias	Michael Salgado	Tejano		Zurdo
7	Azul Se Mira	Adriel Favela	Regional Mexican		Gerencia 360 Music
7	El Encuentro	Bambi	Pop rock		Universal Music
7	Pintor Do Mundo	Pr. Lucas	Latin Christian		MK Music
7	Marimba del Pacífico	Río Mira			
14	Como Anillo al Dedo	Aymee Nuviola	Tropical fusion		Top Stop Music
14	Mística Ciudad	Miguel Pereiro	Tango		Epsa Music
14	Enrique Granados: Goyescas	José Menor	Classical		Ibs Classical
21	Golden	Romeo Santos	Bachata	"Héroe Favorito" "Imitadora" "Bella y Sensual" "Sobredosis"	Sony Music Latin
21	Fantasma	La Tortuga China			
27	Enamorándote	La Reunion Norteña	Regional Mexican		Fonovisa
28	Raíz	El Septeto Santiaguero	Tropical		EGREM
28	La Sangre Buena	Ella Es Tan Cargosa	Pop rock		Rinoceronte Discos, Sony
28	Recanto	Yamandu Costa			Bagual
28	No Mundo Dos Sons	Hermeto Pascoal & Grupo			Selo Sesc
28	Contraste	Naiara Azevedo			Som Livre

==== August ====
Day	Title	Artist	Genre(s)	Singles	Label
4	Lengua Muerta	Saiko	Pop rock	"No me importa nada" "El Regalo" "Viaje Estelar" "Arder el cielo"	Independent
4	Feliz	Nahuel Pennisi	Pop rock		Sony Music, Ariola
4	Só Vem! Ao Vivo	Thiaguinho	Samba		Som Livre
4	Meio Que Tudo É Um	Apanhador Só			Independent
11	En Letra de Otro	Pedro Capó	Latin pop		Sony Music Latin
11	Ayo	Bomba Estéreo			Sony Music Latin
11	Adoração Na Guerra Ao Vivo	Léa Mendonça	Latin Christian		MK Music
11	En Letra De Otro	Pedro Capó			Sony Music Latin
18	Los Gustos Que Me Doy	Banda Los Recoditos	Banda		Fonovisa
18	Zapateando en el Norte	Various artists			Azteca
18	F-A-C-I-L	Richard Coleman	Rock en español		Popart Discos, Sony Music
18	Bem Sertanejo - O Show	Michel Teló	Músuca sertaneja		Som Livre
25	Odisea	Ozuna	Reggaeton	"Si No Te Quiere" "No Quiere Enamorarse" "Dile Que Tú Me Quieres" "Tu Foto" "Bebé "El Farsante" "Se Preparó" "Quiero Repetir" "Síguelo Bailando"	VP, New Masters
25	Me Dejé Llevar	Christian Nodal	Ranchera	"Adiós Amor" "Probablemente"	Fonovisa
25	Art of the Arrangement	Doug Beavers	Tropical		Independent
25	Caravanas	Chico Buarque	MPB		Biscoito Fino
25	Ser	Axel	Latin pop		Sony Music Spain
25	Cucucuprá, Cuprá	Safara	Tropical		Star Arsis Entertainment
25	José Alfredo y Yo	Tania Libertad	Ranchera		Sony Music Mexico
25	Tribalistas	Tribalistas	Brazilian rock		Phonomotor, Universal Music
25	José Serebrier Conducts Granados	José Serebrier	Classical		Somm
29	La Elegancia de la Música	Juan Piña	Vallenato		Vibra Music
29	Tango Cosmopolita	Rodolfo Mederos Trio	Tango		DBN
30	Habla Sobre Mí	Daniel Calveti	Latin Christian		Gracias Producciones

==== September ====
Day	Title	Artist	Genre(s)	Singles	Label
8	Cerca Estás	Marcela Gándara	Latin Christian		Lv&M
9	De Mi Enamorate	Helen Ochoa	Banda		Gerencia 360 Music
10	Update	Yandel	Reggaeton	"Mi Religión" "Explícale" "Como Antes"	Sony Music Latin
11	Diana Burco	Diana Burco	Vallenato		Independent
11	Rei Ninguém	Arthur Nogueira			Natura Musical, Joia Moderna
15	TrapXFicante	Farruko	Latin trap	"Krippy Kush"	Sony Music Latin
15	Cuando el Río Suena...	Rozalén	Latin pop		Conderechoa, Sony Music
15	Jazz Flute Traditions	Néstor Torres	Jazz		Alfi
18	Borghetti Yamandu	Borghetti Yamandu	Brazilian roots		Estação Filmes
22	Salvavidas de Hielo	Jorge Drexler	Latin pop		Warner Music Spain
22	9	Marco Sanguinetti			Exiles
26	Recomeçar	Tim Bernardes	Brazilian rock		Risco, Tratore
27	Nocturno	Anaadi	Pop		Jasmine Music
28	Ana & Gio	Ana & Gio	Children's		Violet Friends Music, Alera
29	Siguiente	El David Aguilar	Latin pop		Discos Valiente, Universal
29	Xenia	Xenia	Pop		Agogo Cultural, Natura Musical
29	Bita e a Natureza	Mundo Bita	Children's		Sony Music Brasil

=== Fourth quarter ===
==== October ====
Day	Title	Artist	Genre(s)	Singles	Label
6	Mi Vida Eres Tú	Virlan Garcia	Regional Mexican		ShowBusiness
6	3.000 Vivos	Los Pericos			Sony Music Argentina
13	Guerra de Poder	Calibre 50	Norteño		Calibre, Universal
13	Mano Que Zuera	João Bosco	MPB		Som Livre
13	Campos Neutrais	Vitor Ramil	MPB		Satolep Music
20	Ahora Soy Yo	Luis Coronel	Banda		Sony Music Latin
20	Expectativas	Enrique Bunbury	Rock en español		Warner Music Spain
20	La Esquina del Bailador	Pete Perignon	Salsa		Pete Perignon Music
20	Natureza Universal	Hermeto Pascoal & Big Band	Jazz		Scubidu Music
20	Ana Vilela	Ana Vilela	Pop		Slap
20	70 Anos	As Galvão	Música sertaneja		Atração Fonográfica
22	Daquele Jeito!	Anastácia	Brazilian roots		Atração Fonográfica
26	Som Da Minha Vida	Fernanda Brum	Latin Christian		MK Music
27	Unstoppable	Karol G	Reggaeton	"Casi Nada" "Muñeco De Lego" "Hello" "A Ella" "Ahora Me Llama" "Eres Mi Todo" "La Dama"	Universal Music Latino
27	Fixtado	Sara Tavares	Portuguese roots		Sony Music Portugal

==== November ====
Day	Title	Artist	Genre(s)	Singles	Label
1	Segundo Piso	Mv Caldera			
3	Underground	T3r Elemento	Regional Mexican		La R, Parral
3	Puñal	Dante Spinetta	Latin alternative		Sony Music Argentina, Columbia
3	La Fiesta Continúa	La Sonora Santanera	Tropical		Sony Music
3	Con Toda La Fuerza	Conjunto Primavera	Norteño		Fonovisa, Universal Music Latin Entertainment
3	Idas y Vueltas	María Mulata	Folk		Onerpm
10	Vives	Carlos Vives	Vallenato	"La Bicicleta" "Al Filo de Tu Amor" "Robarte un Beso"	Sony Music Latin
10	Mismo Sitio, Distinto Lugar	Vetusta Morla	Latin alternative		Pequeño Saito, Sony
10	Sou Do Interior (Ao Vivo)	Fernando & Sorocaba	Música sertaneja		Sony Music Brasil
10	Pa' Mi Gente	Charlie Aponte	Salsa		CA
14	Un Bosque Encantado 2	Colectivo Animal	Children's		Colectivo Animal
16	Totalmente Juan Gabriel, Vol. II	Aida Cuevas	Mariachi		Cuevas
17	Prometo	Pablo Alborán	Latin pop	"Saturno" "No Vaya a Ser" "Prometo"	Warner Music Spain
17	New Tradiciones	Adrienne Houghton	Latin pop		Bridge
17	Versus: World Tour, EN Vivo Desde Arena Ciudad De Mexico	Gloria Trevi and Alejandra Guzmán	Latin pop		Universal Music, Rebeleon
24	¡México Por Siempre!	Luis Miguel	Mariachi	"La Fiesta del Mariachi" "Llamarada"	Warner Music Mexico
24	La Ciudad Liberada	Fito Páez	Rock en español		Sony Music Argentina
24	Munduê	Diogo Nogueira	Samba		Universal Music

==== December ====
Day	Title	Artist	Genre(s)	Singles	Label
1	Victory	Wisin	Reggaeton	"Vacaciones" "Escapate Conmigo" ""Move Your Body" "Todo Comienza En La Disco" "Quisiera Alejarme"	Sony Music Latin
1	Aluê	Airto Moreira			Selo Sesc
1	Caminando Con Manuel	Alba Molina	Flamenco		Universal Music Spain
7	Cambio de Piel	Denise Rosenthal	Pop	"Cambio de Piel" "Isidora" "Cabello de Angel" "Lucha en Equilibrio" "Encadená"	Universal Music Chile
8	+ ES +: El Concierto	Alejandro Sanz	Latin pop		Universal Music Spain
8	Pentecostes: En Vivo Desde Madison Square Garden, New York	Miel San Marcos	Latin Christian		Uncion Producciones
8	Elas Em Evidências	Chitãozinho & Xororó	Música sertaneja		Universal Music
11	Clavo y Canela	Eva Ayllón	Folk		Aylloncito Producciones
15	El Hijo Del Desierto	El Dasa	Regional Mexican		Fonovisa
15	Camino, Fuego y Libertad	Pablo López	Latin pop		Universal Music Spain
25	En el Camino	El Fantasma	Banda		Afinartemusic

=== Dates unknown ===
Title	Artist	Genre(s)	Singles	Label
El Añejo Jardín	La Colmenita	Tropical		EGREM
'Zamba Puta'	La Lá			
IIII+IIII	ÌFÉ			

== Best-selling records ==
=== Best-selling albums ===
The following is a list of the top 10 best-selling Latin albums in the United States in 2017, according to Billboard.

Rank	Album	Artist
1	Fénix	Nicky Jam
2	El Dorado	Shakira
3	Energia	J Balvin
4	Dance Latin #1 Hits 2.0: Los Exitos del Momento	Various artists
5	Odisea	Ozuna
6	Golden	Romeo Santos
7	Formula, Vol. 2	Romeo Santos
8	Primera Cita	CNCO
9	Pretty Boy, Dirty Boy	Maluma
10	Five	Prince Royce

=== Best-performing songs ===
The following is a list of the top 10 best-performing Latin songs in the United States in 2017, according to Billboard.

Rank	Single	Artist
1	"Despacito"	Luis Fonsi and Daddy Yankee featuring Justin Bieber
2	"Mi Gente"	J Balvin and Willy William featuring Beyoncé
3	"Chantaje"	Shakira featuring Maluma
4	"Felices los 4"	Maluma
5	"Escápate Conmigo"	Wisin featuring Ozuna
6	"El Amante"	Nicky Jam
7	"Súbeme la Radio"	Enrique Iglesias featuring Descemer Bueno, Zion & Lennox or Sean Paul
8	"Reggaetón Lento (Bailemos)"	CNCO & Little Mix
9	"Adiós Amor"	Christian Nodal
10	"Ahora Dice"	Chris Jedi with J Balvin and Ozuna featuring Arcángel

== Deaths ==
- January 1 – Memo Morales, 79, Venezuelan singer
- January 13 – Horacio Guarany, 91, Argentine folkloric singer and writer, cardiac arrest.
- January 19 – Loalwa Braz, 63, Brazilian singer-songwriter ("Lambada"), burns.
- January 23 – Bimba Bosé, 41, Italian-born Spanish model, designer, singer and actress, breast cancer.
- January 27 – Elkin Ramírez, 54, Colombian singer-songwriter (Kraken), brain cancer.
- February 15 – Tibério Gaspar, 73, Brazilian composer and musician
- February 25 – Fernando Toussaint, Mexican jazz musician and composer
- February 27 – Fernando Riba, 67, Mexican songwriter
- March 8 – Dave Valentin, 64, American Latin jazz flautist, Parkinson's disease.
- March 11 – Ángel Parra, 73, Chilean singer and songwriter, lung cancer.
- April 7 – Sal Cuevas, 61, American salsa bassist
- April 13 – José Miguel Class, 78, Puerto Rican singer.
- April 14 – Martín Elías, 26, Colombian vallenato singer (traffic collision).
- April 23 – Jerry Adriani, 70, Brazilian singer and actor (cancer)
- April 30 – Belchior, 70, Brazilian singer and composer
- May 19 – Kid Vinil, 62, Brazilian musician and record producer
- June 14 – Luis Abanto Morales, 93, Peruvian singer and composer.
- June 16 – Eliza Clívia, 37, Brazilian singer, traffic collision.
- July 9 – Paquita Rico, 87, Spanish singer and actress (Let's Make the Impossible!, The Balcony of the Moon, Where Are You Going, Alfonso XII?).
- July 18 – José Bragato, 101, Italian-born Argentine cellist, composer, conductor and arranger (Teatro Colón).
- July 20 – Wilindoro Cacique, 75, Peruvian Amazonian cumbia musician (Juaneco y Su Combo), pancreatic cancer.
- July 21 – Juan Romero, 88, Mexican Christian singer
- August 4
  - Luiz Melodia, 66, Brazilian actor, singer, and songwriter (bone marrow cancer)
  - Jessy Serrata, 63, American Tejano musician, kidney cancer.
- August 19 – Concha Valdés Miranda, 89, Cuban composer
- August 26 – Wilson das Neves, 81, Brazilian percussionist and singer
- September 4 – Elisa Serna, 75, Spanish protest singer-songwriter, heart attack.
- September 17 – Laudir de Oliveira, 77, Brazilian percussionist (Sérgio Mendes, Marcos Valle, Chicago) and producer.
- October 8 – Coriún Aharonián, 77, Uruguayan electroacoustic music composer and musicologist
- October 17 – Elías Lopés, 72, Puerto Rican trumpet musician
- October 30 – Daniel Viglietti, 78, Uruguayan folk singer, guitarist, composer and political activist.
- November 2 – María Martha Serra Lima, 72, Argentine ballad and bolero singer
- November 17 – Blanquito Man, 47, Venezuelan singer
- November 28 – Magín Díaz, 94, Colombian folk singer and songwriter, Latin Grammy winner (2017)
- December 4 – Carles Santos, 77, Spanish pianist and composer.
- December 23 – Chino Gonazalez, Argentine singer and member of La Nueva Luna
