= Sofía Reyes discography =

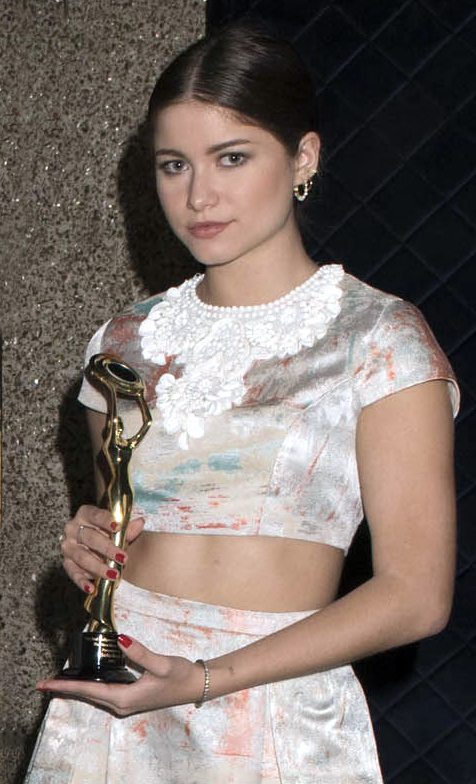
- Reyes in February 2016
- Studio albums: 3
- Singles: 26
- Promotional singles: 5

Mexican singer Sofía Reyes has released three studio albums, twenty-six singles (including ten as a featured artist), and five promotional singles.

== Studio albums ==
List of studio albums with selected details, chart positions, sales and certifications
Title	Studio album details	Peak chart positions			Certifications
Title	Studio album details	US Heat	US Latin	US Latin Pop	Certifications
Louder!	Released: February 3, 2017; Label: Warner Music Latina; Formats: CD, digital download	13	23	8	RIAA: Gold (Latin)
Mal de Amores	Released: February 10, 2022; Label: Warner Music Latina; Formats: CD, digital download	—	—	15	RIAA: Platinum (Latin); CAPIF: 4× Platinum
Milamores	Released: November 2, 2023; Label: Warner Music Latina; Formats: CD, digital download	—	—	—	Pending
"—" denotes a title that was not released or did not chart in that territory

== Singles ==
=== As lead artist ===
List of singles as lead artist, with selected chart positions and certifications, showing year released and album name
Title	Year	Peak chart positions										Certifications	Album
Title	Year	MEX	ARG	AUT	COL	NLD	SPA	SWE Heat.	SWI	US Latin	US Latin Pop	Certifications	Album
"Muévelo" (featuring Wisin)	2014	18	—	—	—	—	13	—	—	25	18	PROMUSICAE: Platinum; RIAA: Platinum (Latin)	Louder!
"Conmigo (Rest of Your Life)"	2015	20	—	—	—	—	49	—	—	—	31	RIAA: Gold (Latin)	Louder!
"Solo Yo" / "Nobody But Me" (with Prince Royce)	2016	32	—	—	—	—	—	—	—	35	1	RIAA: Gold (Latin)	Louder!
"Llegaste Tú" (featuring Reykon)	2016	16	—	—	— (Note: "Llegaste Tú" did not enter the National-Report Top 100, but peaked at number 18 on the Monitor Latino Colombian Top 20 Pop chart.)	—	—	—	—	—	19	RIAA: Gold (Latin)	Louder!
"1, 2, 3" (featuring Jason Derulo and De La Ghetto)	2018	3	19	32	27	95	5	2	63	24	17	AMPROFON: Gold; ASINCOL: Platinum; CAPIF: Platinum; FIMI: Gold; PROMUSICAE: 3× Platinum; RIAA: 9× Platinum (Latin)	Mal de Amores
"Vamos por La Estrella" (with Paty Cantú and Kap G)	2018	—	—	—	—	—	—	—	—	—	24		Non-album single
"R.I.P." (featuring Rita Ora and Anitta)	2019	10	41	—	49	— (Note: "R.I.P." did not enter the Single Top 100, but peaked at No. 13 on the Dutch Single Tip chart.)	53	5	56	19	26	AMPROFON: Platinum; RIAA: Platinum (Latin)	Mal de Amores
"¿Qué Ha Pasao'?" (with Abraham Mateo)	2019	27	48	—	—	—	—	—	—	—	—		Sigo a Lo Mío
"A Tu Manera (Corbata)" (with Jhay Cortez)	2019	25	85	—	—	—	—	—	—	—	33		Mal de Amores
"Idiota"	2020	31	—	—	—	—	—	—	—	—	—		Mal de Amores
"Cuando Estás Tú" (with Piso 21)	2020	43	— (Note: "Cuando Estás Tú" did not enter the Billboard Argentina Hot 100, but peaked at number 18 on the Monitor Latino Argentina Latin Airplay chart.)	—	—	—	—	—	—	—	—		Mal de Amores
"Échalo Pa' Ca" (with Darell and Lalo Ebratt)	2020	20	—	—	—	—	—	—	—	—	—		Mal de Amores
"Tick Tock" (with Thalía and Farina)	2020	—	—	—	—	—	—	—	—	—	17		Desamorfosis
"Casualidad" (with Pedro Capó)	2021	16	64	—	—	—	—	—	—	—	—		Mal de Amores
"Mal de Amores" (with Becky G)	2021	22	65	—	—	—	—	—	—	—	7	RIAA: Platinum (Latin)	Mal de Amores
"Marte" (with María Becerra)	2022	24	3	—	—	—	—	—	—	—	—	RIAA: Gold (Latin)	Mal de Amores
"TQUM" (with Danna Paola)	2023	—	—	—	—	—	—	—	—	—	—		Milamores
"How You Samba" (with Kris Kross Amsterdam & Tinie Tempah)	2023	—	—	—	—	4	—	—	—	—	—		Non-album single
"Guaro con Ron" (with Alan Walker)	2025	—	—	—	—	—	—	—	—	—	—		TBA
"—" denotes a title that was not released or did not chart in that territory

=== As a featured artist ===
List of singles as featured artist with selected chart positions, showing year released and album name
Title	Year	Peak chart positions						Certifications	Album
Title	Year	MEX	ECU	FRA	ITA	NLD	US Dance	Certifications	Album
"How to Love" (Cash Cash featuring Sofía Reyes)	2016	—	—	—	—	—	16		Blood, Sweat and 3 Years
"Diggy" (Spencer Ludwig featuring Sofía Reyes)	2016	—	—	—	—	—	—		Non-album singles
"Tell Me" (AXSHN featuring Sofía Reyes)	2017	—	—	—	—	—	—		Non-album singles
"Bittersweet" (Yellow Claw featuring Sofía Reyes)	2018	—	—	—	—	—	—		New Blood
"Never Let You Go" (Slushii featuring Sofía Reyes)	2019	—	—	—	—	—	—		Non-album single
"Lo Siento" (Beret featuring Sofía Reyes)	2019	17	75	—	—	—	—		Prisma
"Highway" (Cheat Codes featuring Sofía Reyes and Willy William)	2019	—	—	—	—	—	—		Non-album single
"Il tuo profumo" (Fred De Palma featuring Sofía Reyes)	2019	—	—	—	35	—	—	FIMI: Platinum	Uebe
"Whoppa (Tinie Tempah featuring Sofia Reyes and Farina	2020	—	—	—	—	—	—		Non-album singles
"Dancing on Dangerous" (Imanbek and Sean Paul featuring Sofía Reyes)	2021	—	—	61	37	58	—	FIMI: Platinum	Non-album singles
"Family" (David Guetta featuring Sofía Reyes and A Boogie Wit da Hoodie)	2021	—	—	—	—	—	—		Non-album singles
"Kids" (Illy featuring Sofía Reyes)	2024	—	—	—	—	—	—		Good Life (Illy album)
"—" denotes a title that was not released or did not chart in that territory

=== Promotional singles ===
List of promotional singles showing year released and album name
Title	Year	Album
"Now Forever" (featuring Khleo Thomas)	2013	Non-album singles
"So Beautiful (A Place Called Home)"	2013	Non-album singles
"Louder! (Love Is Loud)" (with Francesco Yates and Spencer Ludwig)	2016	Louder!
"Gotta Be Patient" (with Michael Buble and Barenaked Ladies)	2020	Non-album single
"Seaside" (with Diane Warren, Rita Ora and Reik)	2021	Diane Warren: The Cave Sessions Vol. 1
