= List of Billboard Tropical Airplay number ones of 2017 =

The Billboard Tropical Airplay chart is a subchart of the Latin Airplay that ranked the best-performing songs received on radio stations that primarily played tropical music. On the issue dated January 21, 2017, Billboard revised the methodology of the chart to measure airplay based on audience impressions of tropical music songs over approximately 140 Latin music radio stations. Published by Billboard magazine, the data are compiled by Nielsen Broadcast Data Systems based collectively on each single's weekly airplay.

== Chart history ==
Issue date	Song	Artist	Ref
January 7	"Vas A Entender"	Rolf Sanchez	
January 14	"La Sandunguita"	Diego Amador featuring Oscar D'Leon	
January 21	"Olvidame y Pega La Vuelta"	Jennifer Lopez & Marc Anthony	
January 28	"Moneda"	Prince Royce featuring Gerardo Ortiz	
February 4	"Moneda"	Prince Royce featuring Gerardo Ortiz	
February 11	"Moneda"	Prince Royce featuring Gerardo Ortiz	
February 18	"La Mala y La Buena"	Alex Sensation + Gente de Zona	
February 25	"La Mala y La Buena"	Alex Sensation + Gente de Zona	
March 4	"Heroe Favorito"	Romeo Santos	
March 11	"Heroe Favorito"	Romeo Santos	
March 18	"Heroe Favorito"	Romeo Santos	
March 25	"Heroe Favorito"	Romeo Santos	
April 1	"Heroe Favorito"	Romeo Santos	
April 8	"Heroe Favorito"	Romeo Santos	
April 15	"Heroe Favorito"	Romeo Santos	
April 22	"Heroe Favorito"	Romeo Santos	
April 29	"Deja Vu"	Prince Royce & Shakira	
May 6	"Deja Vu"	Prince Royce & Shakira	
May 13	"Deja Vu"	Prince Royce & Shakira	
May 20	"Deja Vu"	Prince Royce & Shakira	
May 27	"Deja Vu"	Prince Royce & Shakira	
June 3	"Deja Vu"	Prince Royce & Shakira	
June 10	"Deja Vu"	Prince Royce & Shakira	
June 17	"Deja Vu"	Prince Royce & Shakira	
June 24	"Deja Vu"	Prince Royce & Shakira	
July 1	"Deja Vu"	Prince Royce & Shakira	
July 8	"Deja Vu"	Prince Royce & Shakira	
July 15	"Imitadora"	Romeo Santos	
July 22	"Imitadora"	Romeo Santos	
July 29	"Imitadora"	Romeo Santos	
August 5	"Imitadora"	Romeo Santos	
August 12	"Imitadora"	Romeo Santos	
August 19	"Imitadora"	Romeo Santos	
August 26	"Imitadora"	Romeo Santos	
September 2	"Imitadora"	Romeo Santos	
September 9	"Imitadora"	Romeo Santos	
September 16	"Imitadora"	Romeo Santos	
September 23	"Bailame"	Nacho	
September 30	"Bailame"	Nacho	
October 7	"Bailame"	Nacho	
October 14	"Bailame"	Nacho	
October 21	"Bailame"	Nacho	
October 28	"Bailame"	Nacho	
November 4	"Bailame"	Nacho	
November 11	"Bailame"	Nacho	
November 18	"Bailame"	Nacho	
November 25	"Bailame"	Nacho	
December 2	"Bailame"	Nacho	
December 9	"Bailame"	Nacho	
December 16	"Bailame"	Nacho	
December 23	"Bailame"	Nacho	
December 30	"Bella y Sensual"	Romeo Santos featuring Nicky Jam & Daddy Yankee	
