= Five (Prince Royce album) =

FIVE

Studio album by Prince Royce
- Released: February 24, 2017
- Genre: Bachata; pop; R&B
- Length: 43:57 (standard edition); 67:23 (deluxe edition)
- Language: Spanish; English
- Label: Sony Latin
- Producer: Prince Royce; D'Lesly Lora; Alison Berger; Lincoln Castañeda; Shakira; Rude Boyz; Olgui Chirino; Jean Rodríguez; Spiff TV; Nely; Daniel Flores; Alfredo Matheus; Arturo Brambilla; Efraín Dávila

Prince Royce chronology
Double Vision (2015)	FIVE (2017)	Spotify Singles (2018)

Prince Royce studio album chronology
Double Vision (2015)	Five (2017)	Alter Ego (2020)

Singles from FIVE
- 1. "Culpa al Corazón" Released: November 13, 2015; 2. "La Carretera" Released: May 20, 2016; 3. "Moneda" Released: October 7, 2016; 4. "Déjà Vu" Released: February 24, 2017; 5. "Ganas Locas" Released: July 14, 2017

FIVE is the fifth studio album by American singer and songwriter Prince Royce. It was released on February 24, 2017 by Sony Music Latin. The album includes collaborations with artists such as Shakira, Chris Brown, Zendaya, Farruko, Gerardo Ortíz, Gente de Zona and Arturo Sandoval.

Although the album contains some lyrics in English, it is Royce's first mainly Spanish-language album since Soy el Mismo in 2013. FIVE, predominantly of the bachata genre, became Royce's fourth number-one album on the Billboard Top Latin Albums chart in the United States.

The album was preceded by the release of its lead single, "Culpa al Corazón", on November 13, 2015. Four other singles were released to promote the album between 2016 and 2017: "La Carretera", "Moneda", "Ganas Locas", and "Déjà Vu". This last single became the album's most successful commercially and was certified 9× Platinum (Latin) by the Recording Industry Association of America (RIAA) in the US.

== Commercial performance ==
The album debuted at number 25 on the Billboard 200, and sold 19,000 album-equivalent units (16,000 in pure sales plus 3,000 track equivalent and streaming equivalent albums), during its first week of release in the United States.

== Track listing ==
Five – Standard edition
No.	Title	Writer(s)	Producer(s)	Length
1.	"No Te Olvides"	Geoffrey Rojas; D'Lesly "Dice" Lora; Shanelli Rojas	Royce; Lora; Alison Berger	3:51
2.	"Culpa Al Corazón"	Rojas; Daniel Santacruz	Royce; Lora; Berger; Lincoln Castañeda	3:42
3.	"Dilema"	Rojas; Lora; Yonathan Then; Salim Asencio	Royce; Lora; Berger	4:10
4.	"La Carretera"	Rojas; Santacruz	Royce; Lora; Berger	3:58
5.	"Ganas Locas" (featuring Farruko)	Rojas; Carlos Efrén Rosado; Gabriel Rodríguez; Héctor Rubén Rivera; Andy Clay	Royce; Lora; Berger; Castañeda	3:20
6.	"Déjà Vu" (with Shakira)	Rojas; Santacruz; Manny Cruz	Royce; Lora; Berger; Shakira; Rude Boyz; Olgui Chirino	3:16
7.	"Asalto"	Rojas; Santacruz; Paolo Tondo	Royce; Lora; Berger	3:09
8.	"Just As I Am" (Spiff TV featuring Prince Royce and Chris Brown)	Rojas; Chris Brown; Tyler Bryant; Jean Rodríguez; Carlos Suárez	Royce; Lora; Berger; Rodríguez; Suárez; Nely; Daniel Flores; Polanco	3:44
9.	"Amor Prohibido"	Rojas; Descemer Bueno; Carlos E. Ortiz	Royce; Lora; Berger; Alfredo Matheus; Arturo Brambilla	4:09
10.	"Moneda" (featuring Gerardo Ortíz)	Rojas; Santacruz; Alejandro Jaén	Royce; Lora; Berger	3:06
11.	"X" (featuring Zendaya)	Rojas; Zendaya Coleman; Rodríguez; Flores	Royce; Lora; Berger; Rodríguez; Flores	3:52
12.	"Tumbao" (featuring Gente de Zona and Arturo Sandoval)	Rojas; Guianko Gómez; Efraín Dávila; Alexander Delgado; Randy Martinez	Royce; Lora; Berger; Dávila	3:40
Total length:				43:57

Five – Deluxe edition
No.	Title	Writer(s)	Producer(s)	Length
13.	"Te Necesito"	Rojas; Lora	Royce; Lora; Berger	4:07
14.	"Cuchi Cuchi"	Rojas; Lora; Alex Díaz; Angel Vásquez	Royce; Lora; Berger	3:56
15.	"Aquel Idiota"	Rojas; Lora; Asencio; Ronald "Dae" López	Royce; Lora; Berger	3:47
16.	"Libérame"	Rojas; Lora; López	Royce; Lora; Berger	3:27
17.	"Mírame"	Rojas; Lora; Joel Vargas; Adrian Peña	Royce; Lora; Berger; Matheus; Brambilla	3:45
18.	"No Creo En El Amor"	Rojas; Lora; José Torres	Royce; Lora; Berger; Matheus; Brambilla	4:24
Total length:				67:23

== Charts ==
=== Weekly charts ===
Chart (2017)	Peak position
Belgian Albums (Ultratop Flanders)	138
Italian Albums (FIMI)	40
Spanish Albums (PROMUSICAE)	48
Swiss Albums (Schweizer Hitparade)	53
US Billboard 200	25
US Top Latin Albums (Billboard)	1
US Tropical Albums (Billboard)	1
Venezuelan Albums (Recordland)	6

=== Year-end charts ===
Chart (2017)	Position
US Top Latin Albums (Billboard)	10
Chart (2018)	Position
US Top Latin Albums (Billboard)	58

== Certifications ==
Region	Certification	Certified units/sales
Chile	Gold	5,000
Mexico (AMPROFON)	Platinum	60,000^{‡}
United States (RIAA)	7× Platinum (Latin)	420,000^{‡}
^{‡} Sales+streaming figures based on certification alone.

== See also ==
- 2017 in Latin music
