= Ganas Locas =

Single by Prince Royce featuring Farruko

from the album Five
- Released: February 14, 2017
- Length: 3:20
- Label: Sony Latin
- Songwriters: Geoffrey Rojas; Carlos Efrén Rosado; Gabriel Rodríguez; Héctor Rubén Rivera; Andy Clay
- Producers: Prince Royce; D'Lesly "Dice" Lora; Alison Berger; Lincoln Castañeda

Prince Royce singles chronology
| "Deja Vu" (2016) | "Ganas Locas" (2017) | "100 Años" (2017) |

Farruko singles chronology
| "Don't Let Go" (2017) | "Ganas Locas" (2017) | "Krippy Kush" (2017) |

Music video
- "Ganas Locas" on YouTube

"Ganas Locas" (transl. "Crazy Desires") is a 2016 song by American singer Prince Royce, featuring Puerto Rican singer Farruko. The song was released on July 14, 2017 as the fifth single taken from Royce's fifth studio album, Five (2017).

== Music video ==
The music video premiered on July 14, 2017 on Prince Royce's Vevo account on YouTube. The music video has surpassed over 24 million views on the platform.

== Live performances ==
Prince Royce performed "Ganas Locas" with Farruko at Latin American music awards in 2017.

== Charts ==
| Chart (2017) | Peak position |
|---|---|
| US Latin Airplay (Billboard) | 34 |
| US Latin Rhythm Airplay (Billboard) | 15 |
| US Tropical Airplay (Billboard) | 6 |

== Certifications ==
| Region | Certification | Certified units/sales |
|---|---|---|
| United States (RIAA) | 3× Platinum (Latin) | 180,000^{‡} |
^{‡} Sales+streaming figures based on certification alone.
