= Culpa al Corazón =

Single by Prince Royce

from the album Five
- Released: November 13, 2015
- Length: 3:42
- Label: Sony Music Latin
- Songwriters: Geoffrey Rojas; Daniel Santacruz
- Producers: Prince Royce; D'Lesly "Dice" Lora; Alison Berger; Lincoln Castañeda

Prince Royce singles chronology
| "Back It Up" (2015) | "Culpa al Corazón" (2015) | "Solo Yo" (2016) |

"Culpa al Corazón" (transl. "Blame the Heart") is a 2015 song by American singer Prince Royce. The song was released on November 13, 2015 as the lead single taken from Royce's fifth studio album, Five (2017). It received a Lo Nuestro nomination for Tropical Song of the Year.

The music video premiered on January 22, 2016 with Shadowhunters co-star Emeraude Toubia (Royce's then-girlfriend, now ex-wife) playing the female lead role.

== Charts ==
=== Weekly charts ===
| Chart (2015–16) | Peak position |
|---|---|
| Dominican Republic (Monitor Latino) | 1 |
| US Hot Latin Songs (Billboard) | 8 |
| US Latin Airplay (Billboard) | 1 |
| US Tropical Airplay (Billboard) | 1 |

=== Year-end charts ===
| Chart (2016) | Position |
|---|---|
| US Hot Latin Songs (Billboard) | 27 |

== Certifications ==
| Region | Certification | Certified units/sales |
|---|---|---|
| United States (RIAA) | 6× Platinum (Latin) | 360,000^{‡} |
^{‡} Sales+streaming figures based on certification alone.

== See also ==
- List of Billboard number-one Latin songs of 2016
