= List of Billboard Hot Latin Songs and Latin Airplay number ones of 2016 =

The Billboard Hot Latin Songs and Latin Airplay are charts that rank the best-performing Latin songs in the United States and are both published weekly by Billboard magazine. The Hot Latin Songs ranks the best-performing Spanish-language songs in the country based digital downloads, streaming, and airplay from all radio stations. The Latin Airplay chart ranks the most-played songs on Spanish-language radio stations in the United States.

== Chart history ==
Chart history
| Issue date | Hot Latin Songs | | | Latin Airplay | | |
| Issue date | Title | Artist(s) | Ref. | Title | Artist(s) | Ref. |
|---|---|---|---|---|---|---|
| January 2 | "Ginza" | J Balvin | | "Ginza" | J Balvin | |
| January 9 | "Ginza" | J Balvin | | "Ginza" | J Balvin | |
| January 16 | "Ginza" | J Balvin | | "Ginza" | J Balvin | |
| January 23 | "Ginza" | J Balvin | | "Vaivén" | Daddy Yankee | |
| January 30 | "Ginza" | J Balvin | | "Encantadora" | Yandel | |
| February 6 | "Ginza" | J Balvin | | "Encantadora" | Yandel | |
| February 13 | "Ginza" | J Balvin | | "Encantadora" | Yandel | |
| February 20 | "Ginza" | J Balvin | | "Culpa al Corazón" | Prince Royce | |
| February 27 | "Ginza" | J Balvin | | "Culpa al Corazón" | Prince Royce | |
| March 5 | "Ginza" | J Balvin | | "Las Cosas de la Vida" | Carlos Vives | |
| March 12 | "Ginza" | J Balvin | | "Culpa al Corazón" | Prince Royce | |
| March 19 | "Hasta el Amanecer" | Nicky Jam | | "Hasta el Amanecer" | Nicky Jam | |
| March 26 | "Hasta el Amanecer" | Nicky Jam | | "Hasta el Amanecer" | Nicky Jam | |
| April 2 | "Hasta el Amanecer" | Nicky Jam | | "Hasta el Amanecer" | Nicky Jam | |
| April 9 | "Hasta el Amanecer" | Nicky Jam | | "Hasta el Amanecer" | Nicky Jam | |
| April 16 | "Hasta el Amanecer" | Nicky Jam | | "Hasta el Amanecer" | Nicky Jam | |
| April 23 | "Hasta el Amanecer" | Nicky Jam | | "Obsesionado" | Farruko | |
| April 30 | "Hasta el Amanecer" | Nicky Jam | | "Hasta el Amanecer" | Nicky Jam | |
| May 7 | "Hasta el Amanecer" | Nicky Jam | | "Duele el Corazón" | Enrique Iglesias featuring Wisin | |
| May 14 | "Duele el Corazón" | Enrique Iglesias featuring Wisin | | "Tan Fácil" | CNCO | |
| May 21 | "Hasta el Amanecer" | Nicky Jam | | "Duele el Corazón" | Enrique Iglesias featuring Wisin | |
| May 28 | "Hasta el Amanecer" | Nicky Jam | | "Duele el Corazón" | Enrique Iglesias featuring Wisin | |
| June 4 | "Duele el Corazón" | Enrique Iglesias featuring Wisin | | "Duele el Corazón" | Enrique Iglesias featuring Wisin | |
| June 11 | "Hasta el Amanecer" | Nicky Jam | | "Bobo" | J Balvin | |
| June 18 | "Hasta el Amanecer" | Nicky Jam | | "La Bicicleta" | Carlos Vives and Shakira | |
| June 25 | "Hasta el Amanecer" | Nicky Jam | | "Duele el Corazón" | Enrique Iglesias featuring Wisin | |
| July 2 | "Bobo" | J Balvin | | "La Bicicleta" | Carlos Vives and Shakira | |
| July 9 | "Duele el Corazón" | Enrique Iglesias featuring Wisin | | "Duele el Corazón" | Enrique Iglesias featuring Wisin | |
| July 16 | "Hasta el Amanecer" | Nicky Jam | | "Duele el Corazón" | Enrique Iglesias featuring Wisin | |
| July 23 | "Duele el Corazón" | Enrique Iglesias featuring Wisin | | "Duele el Corazón" | Enrique Iglesias featuring Wisin | |
| July 30 | "Duele el Corazón" | Enrique Iglesias featuring Wisin | | "Duele el Corazón" | Enrique Iglesias featuring Wisin | |
| August 6 | "Duele el Corazón" | Enrique Iglesias featuring Wisin | | "Duele el Corazón" | Enrique Iglesias featuring Wisin | |
| August 13 | "Duele el Corazón" | Enrique Iglesias featuring Wisin | | "El Perdedor" | Maluma | |
| August 20 | "Duele el Corazón" | Enrique Iglesias featuring Wisin | | "Duele el Corazón" | Enrique Iglesias featuring Wisin | |
| August 27 | "Duele el Corazón" | Enrique Iglesias featuring Wisin | | "La Bicicleta" | Carlos Vives and Shakira | |
| September 3 | "Duele el Corazón" | Enrique Iglesias featuring Wisin | | "La Bicicleta" | Carlos Vives and Shakira | |
| September 10 | "Duele el Corazón" | Enrique Iglesias featuring Wisin | | "La Bicicleta" | Carlos Vives and Shakira | |
| September 17 | "Duele el Corazón" | Enrique Iglesias featuring Wisin | | "Ay Mi Dios" | IAmChino featuring Pitbull and Yandel | |
| September 24 | "Duele el Corazón" | Enrique Iglesias featuring Wisin | | "La Carretera" | Prince Royce | |
| October 1 | "Duele el Corazón" | Enrique Iglesias featuring Wisin | | "De Pies a Cabeza" | Maná and Nicky Jam | |
| October 8 | "Hasta el Amanecer" | Nicky Jam | | "La Bicicleta" | Carlos Vives and Shakira | |
| October 15 | "Hasta el Amanecer" | Nicky Jam | | "Vente Pa' Ca" | Ricky Martin featuring Maluma | |
| October 22 | "Hasta el Amanecer" | Nicky Jam | | "Vente Pa' Ca" | Ricky Martin featuring Maluma | |
| October 29 | "Hasta el Amanecer" | Nicky Jam | | "Safari" | J Balvin featuring Pharrell Williams, Bia and Sky | |
| November 5 | "Shaky Shaky" | Daddy Yankee | | "Otra Vez" | Zion & Lennox featuring J Balvin | |
| November 12 | "Shaky Shaky" | Daddy Yankee | | "Fuego" | Juanes | |
| November 19 | "Chantaje" | Shakira featuring Maluma | | "Chantaje" | Shakira featuring Maluma | |
| November 26 | "Shaky Shaky" | Daddy Yankee | | "Chillax" | Farruko featuring Ky-Mani Marley | |
| December 3 | "Shaky Shaky" | Daddy Yankee | | "Chillax" | Farruko featuring Ky-Mani Marley | |
| December 10 | "Chantaje" | Shakira featuring Maluma | | "Nunca Me Olvides" | Yandel | |
| December 17 | "Chantaje" | Shakira featuring Maluma | | "Vacaciones" | Wisin | |
| December 24 | "Chantaje" | Shakira featuring Maluma | | "Te Quiero Pa' Mi" | Don Omar and Zion & Lennox | |
| December 31 | "Chantaje" | Shakira featuring Maluma | | "Vacaciones" | Wisin | |
