= Spencer Ludwig =

American trumpeter (born 1990)

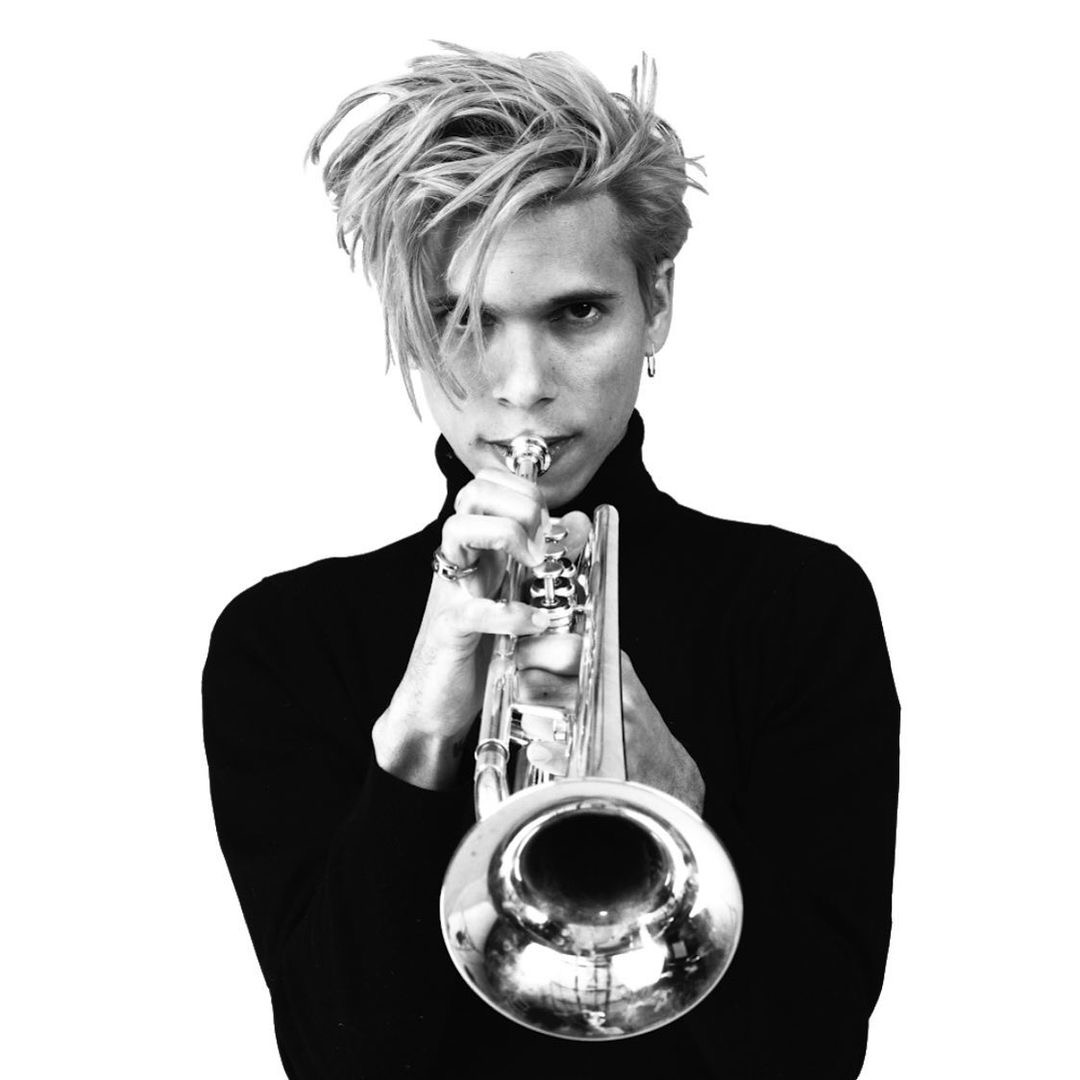

Background information
- Birth name: Spencer Ludwig
- Born: 24 June 1990 (age 34); Los Angeles, California, U.S.
- Occupation(s): Trumpeter, songwriter, producer
- Instrument(s): Trumpet, vocals
- Years active: 2011–present
- Labels: Warner Bros., Trumpet Records
Member of
- Website: SpencerLudwig.com

Spencer Ludwig (born 24 June 1990) is an American trumpeter, singer, songwriter, producer and musical director from Los Angeles, California. The former trumpet player for the band Capital Cities, he recorded on their debut album In a Tidal Wave of Mystery and toured with them from 2011 to 2015. He has also performed with Harry Styles, Dua Lipa, Gallant, Mike Posner, Foster the People, Portugal. The Man, Fitz and the Tantrums, RAC, Joywave, St. Lucia, Cherub, and The Wailers. In 2018, he went independent and formed his own label, Trumpet Records.

== Early life and education ==
Ludwig is the son of a Filipino mother and a Russian-Jewish father. He grew up in Los Angeles, California. He attended Oakwood School and began playing saxophone in the fourth grade due to his school's support for performing arts. Ludwig grew fond of jazz music and performed in the school's jazz band during his middle school years.

Ludwig learned to play the French horn in high school but decided to apply to college as a trumpet player. He started off by teaching himself how to play the trumpet going into his senior year of high school. He was accepted to California Institute of the Arts where he studied jazz. He supported his way through school by playing with local bands from Los Angeles and teaching trumpet part-time at his former high school.

== Career ==
Ludwig was part of the local Los Angeles music scene, performing with numerous bands. He began performing while in college, forming a cover band with friends that graduated from Oakwood School a few years before him. It was in 2011 that Ludwig got his break with Capital Cities.

While playing at a local music festival with a band called Sister Rogers in 2011, Capital Cities band members Ryan Merchant and Sebu Simonian watched him perform, later asking him to join the group as its trumpet player. Ludwig shifted his focus to solely playing with the band and recorded and toured with them for the next four years. He recorded trumpet on the group's platinum debut album, In a Tidal Wave of Mystery.

In 2015, Ludwig signed a record deal with Warner Bros. Records as a solo artist. In July 2016, he released his first two singles "Diggy" and "Right Into U". The song "Diggy" was featured in Target's fall style TV campaign, which premiered on September 14, 2016. "Diggy" also appeared in the feature film, Happy Death Day, and the video game Just Dance 2018. In 2018 Ludwig left Warner Bros. Records to pursue a career as an independent artist and to form his own record label, Trumpet Records. In March 2018, he released his first single as an independent artist "Just Wanna Dance" and he collaborated with five-time Latin Grammy winner Fonseca on his song "Por Pura Curiosidad", which was featured on his album Agustín and earned a Latin Grammy in 2019 for Best Traditional Pop Vocal Album.

In 2017, in front of 46,556 fans, he performed the national anthem on trumpet at the 2017 NHL Winter Classic at Busch Stadium in St. Louis, Missouri featuring the Chicago Blackhawks and St. Louis Blues (a first for the Winter Classic). That same year he became the official band leader and musical director for the annual NFL Honors Awards and in 2021 he became the musical director for the ESPY Awards.

== Discography ==
=== Solo releases ===
Year	Title	Album
2016	"Diggy"	Non-album singles
2016	"Right into You"	Non-album singles
2016	"Midnight Special"	Non-album singles
2016	"Good Time People"	Non-album singles
2016	"Diggy" feat. Sofia Reyes	Non-album singles
2017	"Fuel to the Fire"	Non-album singles
2017	"Legend"	Non-album singles
2017	"Got Me Like"	Non-album singles
2018	"My Trumpet" feat. MC Davo	Non-album singles
2018	"Honeymoon"	Non-album singles
2018	"Just Wanna Dance"	Non-album singles
2018	"Watch Me Walk"	Non-album singles
2019	"Best Life"	Non-album singles
2019	"Jungle in Me"	Non-album singles
2019	"My Nature" feat. Zak Downtown	Non-album singles
2019	"Brand New"	Non-album singles
2021	"From the Vault (Instrumental)"	From the Vault
2021	"From the Vault"	From the Vault

=== Songwriting, recording and production credits ===
Year	Artist	Album	Credit	Certifications
2011	The Belle Brigade	The Belle Brigade	Flugelhorn	
2013	Capital Cities	In a Tidal Wave of Mystery	Trumpet	RIAA: Platinum
2015	Never Shout Never	Black Cat	Trumpet	
2015	Iration	Hotting Up	Trumpet	
2015	Wale	The Album About Nothing	Trumpet	
2017	Magic Giant	In the Wind	Trumpet	
2017	Sofia Reyes	Louder!	Trumpet, songwriter, featured artist	RIAA: Gold
2017	Dua Lipa	Live Acoustic EP	Trumpet	
2018	Fonseca	Agustîn	Trumpet, songwriter, producer, featured artist	
2018	Wingtip	Ghosts of Youth	Trumpet, songwriter	
2018	KUURO	What U Wanna Do	Songwriter, featured artist	
2018	Mini Mansions	Flashbacks: A Collection of B-sides from the Great Pretenders	Trumpet	
2019	Syn Cole	Cool with That	Songwriter	
2020	Too Many Zooz	Make Room	Songwriter, featured artist	
2020	Various artists	100 Greatest Covers	Trumpet	
2020	Spencer Zahn	Sunday Painter	Trumpet	
2021	Fitz	Head Up High	Trumpet	
2021	Aloe Blacc	Made from the Stars	Trumpet	
2021	Various artists	Despertar Contento	Trumpet	
	Sofia Reyes	Más	Trumpet, songwriter, producer	
2022	Kill the Noise	EMBRACE	Trumpet, featured artist	
2022	Jaded	Can You Feel It	Trumpet, songwriter	
2022	Harm & Ease, Fefe Dobson	Lemonade	Trumpet, songwriter	
2023	Travis Scott	Utopia	Trumpet	
2023	Boy in Space	Ciao	Trumpet, songwriter, producer	
2023	Pigeon John	Step On Out	Trumpet, songwriter, producer	
2023	Galxara	Umami	Trumpet, songwriter, producer	
