= La Carretera (song) =

Single by Prince Royce

from the album Five
- Language: Spanish
- English title: "The Road"
- Released: May 20, 2016
- Genre: Bachata
- Length: 3:58
- Label: Sony Latin
- Songwriters: Geoffrey Rojas; Daniel Santacruz
- Producers: Dice; Lincoln Castañeda

Prince Royce singles chronology
"Solo Yo" (2016)	"La Carretera" (2016)	"Moneda" (2016)

Music video
- "La Carretera" on YouTube

"La Carretera" (transl. "The Road") is a song by American singer Prince Royce. The song was released on May 20, 2016, as the second single from Royce's fifth studio album, Five (2017). It was written by the singer and Daniel Santacruz, and produced by Dice and Lincoln Castañeda. The music video premiered on May 19, 2016.

In 2023 following the AI viral song covering a Taylor Swift AI voiced version was published. Becoming viral among the Spanish-speaking fandom from Hispanic America and Spain. The song also became viral in TikTok despite not being ever sang by the artist.

== Charts ==
=== Weekly charts ===
Chart (2016)	Peak position
Colombia (National-Report)	8
Panama Tropical (Monitor Latino)	1
US Hot Latin Songs (Billboard)	8
US Latin Airplay (Billboard)	1
US Tropical Airplay (Billboard)	1

=== Year-end charts ===
Chart (2016)	Position
US Hot Latin Songs (Billboard)	15

== Awards and nominations ==
Year	Ceremony	Award	Result
2016	Latin Grammy Awards	Best Tropical Song	Nominated
2017	Lo Nuestro Awards	Tropical Song of the Year	Nominated
2017	Billboard Latin Music Awards	Airplay Song of the Year	Nominated
2017	Billboard Latin Music Awards	Tropical Song of the Year	Nominated

== Certifications ==
Region	Certification	Certified units/sales
Mexico (AMPROFON)	4× Platinum+Gold	270,000^{‡}
Spain (Promusicae)	Platinum	100,000^{‡}
United States (RIAA)	9× Platinum (Latin)	540,000^{‡}
^{‡} Sales+streaming figures based on certification alone.

== See also ==
- List of Billboard number-one Latin songs of 2016
