= Louder! =

Studio album by Sofía Reyes
- Released: February 3, 2017
- Recorded: 2014–17
- Genre: Latin pop
- Length: 41:03
- Language: Spanish; English
- Label: Warner Music Latina
- Producer: Roman Balleza; Costin Bodea; Cash Cash; Josh Cumbee; Julian Feifel; Toby Gad; Lil' Eddie; Andrei Mihai; Neff-U; Rune Westberg

Sofía Reyes chronology
Louder! (2017)	Mal de Amores (2022)

Singles from Louder!
- 1. "Muévelo" Released: August 22, 2014; 2. "Conmigo (Rest of Your Life)" Released: April 14, 2015; 3. "Solo Yo" Released: January 28, 2016; 4. "Llegaste Tú" Released: October 21, 2016

Louder! is the debut studio album by Mexican singer-songwriter Sofía Reyes. It was released on 3 February 2017 through Warner Music Latina. The album's release was preceded by the release of the singles "Muévelo", "Conmigo (Rest of Your Life)", "Solo Yo" and "Llegaste Tú". The album also includes the Cash Cash collaboration, "How to Love". The album was originally scheduled to be released in early 2015, however it was delayed for unknown reasons.

== Background ==
After signing with D'Leon Records in June 2014, Reyes released her debut single "Muévelo" and scheduled the release her first album for early 2015. From that date to January 2017, the singer released three more singles, one promotional single and featured on Cash Cash's "How To Love" and Spencer Ludwig's "Diggy". In November 2016, it was announced that Reyes' debut studio album would be titled Louder and that it would be dropped in February 2017.

== Singles ==
Reyes' debut single "Muévelo" was released on August 22, 2014 and featured guest vocals from Puerto Rican rapper Wisin. Reyes co-wrote the "nightclub-friendly anthem" with Wisin, Toby Gad, Lil' Eddie, Eritza Laues, Marissa Jack, and Slikk. The song peaked at number 25 on the Billboard Hot Latin Songs and at number 18 on the Mexico Airplay chart. In Spain, it peaked at number 13 and was certified platinum.

"Conmigo (Rest of Your Life)" was released as the album's second single in early 2016. The song has been described as "a breezy, bilingual pop record with an R&B sensibility" and was written and produced by Romanian producer Andrei Mihai, Nuyorican Lil' Eddie and Reyes.

The third single, "Solo Yo", which features American singer Prince Royce, was released on January 28, 2016. With "Solo Yo", Reyes became the first solo lead female act to hit No. 1 on the Billboard Latin Pop Songs chart in five years. The last time a woman crowned the chart was in 2011 when Jennifer Lopez spent five weeks atop the chart with "Ven A Bailar". An English version of the song titled "Nobody But Me" was released on March 3, 2016.

On October 21, 2016, Reyes released "Llegaste Tú" featuring Reykon as the album's fourth single.

=== Promotional singles ===
"Louder! (Love Is Loud)" featuring Canadian artist Francesco Yates and trumpeter Spencer Ludwig, was released as a promotional single on September 2, 2016. The "upbeat and energetic Spanglish track" was the theme song for Garnier Fructis Mexico #NoCortes campaign.

== Track listing ==
Louder!
No.	Title	Writer(s)	Producer(s)	Length
1.	"Muévelo" (featuring Wisin)	Sofia Reyes; Tobias Gad; Marissa Jack; Eritza Laues; Juan Luis Morera; Rickey Offord; Edwin Serrano	Josh Cumbee; Gad	3:32
2.	"De Aquí a la Luna"	Reyes; Julian Feifel; Shari Lynn Short; Hilton "Deuce" Wright II	Feifel	3:09
3.	"Solo Yo" (with Prince Royce)	Reyes; Scott Effman; Lukas Nathanson; Taylor Parks	Nathanson; Effman	4:08
4.	"Don't Mean a Thing"	Reyes; Rune Westberg; Prince Royce	Westberg	3:14
5.	"Your Voice"	Reyes; Westberg; Geoffrey Royce	Westberg	3:30
6.	"Puedes Ver Pero No Tocar"	Reyes; Feifel; Short; Wright	Feifel	3:29
7.	"Louder! (Love Is Loud)" (featuring Francesco Yates and Spencer Ludwig)	Reyes; Roman Balleza; Effman; Charlie Guerrero; Spencer Ludwig	Balleza	3:16
8.	"Llegaste Tú" (featuring Reykon)	Reyes; Jorge Villamizar; Theron Feemster	Neff-U	3:45
9.	"Conmigo (Rest of Your Life)"	Reyes; Feifel; Andrei Mihai; Serrano	Lil' Eddie; Mihai	3:18
10.	"Girls"	Reyes; Mihai; Serrano; Costin Bodea	Mihai; Bodea; Lil' Eddie	2:56
11.	"Paraiso"	Reyes; Westberg; Claudia Brant	Westberg	3:07
12.	"How to Love" (Spanish version; Cash Cash featuring Sofía Reyes)	Reyes; Samuel Frisch; Alex Makhlouf; Jean Paul Makhlouf; Jennifer Decilveo; Ilsey Juber	Cash Cash	3:39
Total length:				41:03

== Charts ==
Chart (2017)	Peak position
US Latin Pop Albums (Billboard)	8
US Heatseekers Albums (Billboard)	13
US Top Latin Albums (Billboard)	23

== Certifications ==
Region	Certification	Certified units/sales
United States (RIAA)	Gold (Latin)	30,000^{‡}
^{‡} Sales+streaming figures based on certification alone.

== Louder Tour ==
Louder Tour
- Tour by Sofia Reyes
- Associated album: Louder!
- Start date: April 20, 2017
- Legs: 1
- No. of shows: 3 in North America; 1 in South America; 4 in Total

Reyes embarked on the Louder Tour in order to support the album. The tour began on April 20, 2017 in Buenos Aires at Teatro Gran Rex. On April 11, 2017, it was announced that the tour will visit the United States.

=== Setlist ===
This set list is representative of the show on April 20, 2017 in Buenos Aires, Argentina. It is not representative of all concerts for the duration of the tour.

1. "Louder! (Love is Loud)"
2. "Paraiso"
3. "De Aquí a la Luna"
4. "Llegaste Tú"
5. "Your Voice"
6. "Puedes ver pero no tocar"
7. "So Beautiful (A Place Called Home)"
8. "Solo Yo"
9. "Shape of You" (Ed Sheeran cover)
10. "Now Forever"
11. "Don't Mean a Thing"
12. "Conmigo (Rest of Your Life)"
13. "I Don't Wanna Live Forever" (ZAYN & Taylor Swift cover)
14. "Girls"
15. "Muévelo"
16. "How to Love"
Notes
- During the show in Buenos Aires, Reyes was joined onstage by Kendall Schmidt to perform "I Don't Wanna Live Forever" and an English version of "Conmigo (Rest of Your Life)".

=== Tour dates ===
List of concerts, showing date, city, country, venue, opening acts, tickets sold, number of available tickets and amount of gross revenue
Date	City	Country	Venue	Opening acts	Attendance	Revenue
South America
April 20, 2017	Buenos Aires	Argentina	Teatro Gran Rex	Jandino	—	—
North America
September 2, 2017 (Note: The concert of September 2, 2017 in Wisconsin is part of the 2017 Los Dells Festival.)	Wisconsin	United States	Woodside Ranch Center	—	—	—
November 25, 2017 (Note: The concert of November 25, 2017 in Monterrey is part of the Elusion Music Festival 2017.)	Monterrey	Mexico	Cintermex	—	—	—
November 30, 2017	Mexico City	Mexico	El Plaza Condesa	—	—	—

=== Cancelled or rescheduled shows ===
List of cancelled or rescheduled concerts, showing date, city, country, venue and reason for cancellation
Date	City	Country	Venue	Reason/Additional Info
April 22, 2017	Santiago	Chile	Teatro La Cúpula	Unknown
October 13, 2017	Mexico City	Mexico	El Plaza Condesa	Rescheduled for November 30, 2017 due to the 2017 Central Mexico earthquake
