= Jessy Serrata =

American singer

Jessy Serrata (November 2, 1953 – August 4, 2017), nicknamed "Mr. Iron Throat", was an American Tejano musician and vocalist. Jessy was born in Knox City, Texas, to Matias and Agapita Serrata. He appeared on over 17 albums. His daughter, Brandy Bee Serrata, is also a vocalist.

Although he was best known for his voice, Jessy also played bass guitar. His music career began with Agapito Zuniga (a.k.a. El Rey de la Cumbia). In 1972, he became a member of the group Los Buenos which included his brother Rene Serrata; the brothers would also perform as Los Hermanos Serrata. Jessy was half of the duo Los Chachos with Cha Cha Jimenez.

Jessy's trademark phrase was "Awww Baby", often uttered to express his enthusiasm while performing his music. He tours throughout the US with his band, The New Wave Band. His album Better Than Ever was nominated for a Latin Grammy in 2004.

Recorded and performed with:

- Steve Jordan
- Oscar Hernandez y Los Professionales
- Conjunto Bernal
- Bobby Naranjo y Grupo Dirreccion
- Tuff Band

== Discography ==
- Conoscan Los Buenos
- Steve Jordan albums
  - Camella
  - La Petra
- Mi Unico Carino (as part of Tuff Band) - 1984
- La Tejanita - 1992
- La Tejanita Two - 1998
- Better Than Ever - 2004

=== Hits he has composed ===
- "La Quiero"
- "Vuelve"
- "La Tejanita Mujer"
- "Santa Loco"
- "El Potpourri" (with Conjunto Bernal) - includes "Desde Ayer", the Beatles hit "Yesterday" translated into Spanish
