= Solo Yo =

Single by Sofía Reyes and Prince Royce

from the album Louder!
- Released: January 29, 2016
- Length: 4:08
- Label: Warner Music
- Songwriters: Sofía Reyes; Scott Effman; Lukas Nathanson; Bostroem; Taylor Parks

Sofía Reyes singles chronology
"Conmigo (Rest of Your Life)" (2015)	"Solo Yo" (2016)	"How to Love" (2016)

Prince Royce singles chronology
"Culpa al Corazón" (2015)	"Solo Yo" (2016)	"La Carretera" (2016)

"Solo Yo" (transl. "Only Me") is a vocal duet credited to Mexican singer Sofía Reyes and Dominican-American singer Prince Royce. The song was released on January 29, 2016 as the third single from Reyes debut studio album, Louder! (2017). It received a Lo Nuestro nomination for Pop/Rock Song of the Year.

An English version was released on March 11, 2016 under the title "Nobody But Me".

== Charts ==
Chart (2016)	Peak position
US Latin Pop Airplay (Billboard)	1
US Hot Latin Songs (Billboard)	35
US Tropical Airplay (Billboard)	27
US Latin Airplay (Billboard)	28

== Certifications ==
Region	Certification	Certified units/sales
United States (RIAA)	Gold (Latin)	30,000^{‡}
^{‡} Sales+streaming figures based on certification alone.
