= R.I.P. (Sofía Reyes song) =

2019 single by Sofía Reyes

Single by Sofía Reyes featuring Rita Ora and Anitta

from the album Mal de Amores
- Language: Spanish; English; Portuguese
- Released: 15 March 2019
- Genre: Latin pop
- Length: 3:07
- Label: Warner Latina
- Songwriters: Sofía Reyes; Rita Ora; Chaz William Mishan; David Delazyn; Marco Masis; Shari Lynn Short; Omar Tavarez; Thomas Augusto
- Producers: The Fliptones; Tainy

Sofía Reyes singles chronology
"Never Let You Go" (2019)	"R.I.P." (2019)	"¿Qué Ha Pasao?" (2019)

Rita Ora singles chronology
"Only Want You" (2019)	"R.I.P." (2019)	"Carry On" (2019)

Anitta singles chronology
"Favela Chegou" (2019)	"R.I.P." (2019)	"Poquito" (2019)

Music video
- "R.I.P." on YouTube

"R.I.P." is a song by Mexican singer Sofía Reyes featuring British singer Rita Ora and Brazilian singer Anitta. It was released on 15 March 2019 by Warner Music Latina, accompanied by its music video.

== Background ==
Reyes announced the collaboration and the song title in a clip posted to her Twitter on 20 February 2019.

== Composition ==
"R.I.P." was written by Reyes, Ora, Shari Lynn Short, Omar Tavarez, Thomas Augusto, Marco Masís, Chaz Mishan and David Delazyn. The latter two, Mishan and Delazyn (forming the duo The Fliptones) produced the track, along with Masís (Tainy). Rolling Stone described the song as starting with a "cumbia shuffle and infectious hook — evoking a slight inverse of Selena’s “Bidi Bidi Bom Bom”", while lyrically it "shrugs off negative vibes." Billboard magazine wrote how the collaboration "highlights the mix of nationalities, as it includes lines in Spanish, English and Portuguese."

== Music video ==
The music video for the song was released on 15 March 2019. Directed by Eif Rivera, it was filmed in Los Angeles. Rolling Stone called the video "vibrant" and "sumptuous". A vertical video for the song was also released as a Spotify exclusive.

The video won the Favorite Video award at 2019 Latin American Music Awards and Best International Video award at the 2019 Los40 Music Awards.

== Charts ==
=== Weekly charts ===
Chart (2019)	Peak position
Argentina (Argentina Hot 100)	41
Belgium (Ultratip Bubbling Under Wallonia)	8
Colombia (National-Report)	49
Czech Republic Singles Digital (ČNS IFPI)	85
Ecuador (National-Report)	14
Greece (IFPI)	38
Hungary (Stream Top 40)	34
Ireland (IRMA)	69
Lithuania (AGATA)	28
Mexico Airplay (Billboard)	10
New Zealand Hot Singles (RMNZ)	7
Portugal (AFP)	36
Puerto Rico (Monitor Latino)	4
Romania (Airplay 100)	24
Slovakia Singles Digital (ČNS IFPI)	43
Spain (PROMUSICAE)	53
Sweden Heatseeker (Sverigetopplistan)	5
Switzerland (Schweizer Hitparade)	56
US Hot Latin Songs (Billboard)	19
Venezuela (National-Report)	1

=== Year-end charts ===
Chart (2019)	Position
Argentina (Monitor Latino)	84
Costa Rica (Monitor Latino)	94
Guatemala (Monitor Latino)	65
Portugal (AFP)	153
Puerto Rico (Monitor Latino)	73

== Certifications ==
Region	Certification	Certified units/sales
Brazil (Pro-Música Brasil)	3× Platinum	120,000^{‡}
Mexico (AMPROFON)	Platinum	60,000^{‡}
Peru	2× Platinum	
Portugal (AFP)	Platinum	10,000^{‡}
Spain (Promusicae)	Platinum	60,000^{‡}
United States (RIAA)	Platinum (Latin)	60,000^{‡}
^{‡} Sales+streaming figures based on certification alone.
