= Juaneco y Su Combo =

Peruvian cumbia band

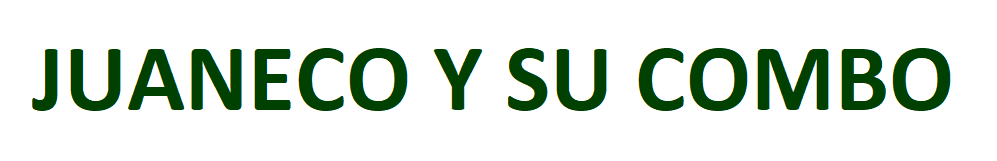
Logo.

Juaneco y Su Combo is a Peruvian cumbia band formed in Pucallpa, Peru in 1966.

== History ==
Juaneco y Su Combo was originally founded by the amateur saxophonist Juan Wong Paredes as Juaneco y su Conjunto. In 1969, Wong handed over control of the band to his son, Juan Wong Popolizio, who subsequently renamed it "Juaneco y su Combo". During the early 1970s, the band's popularity peaked, and they became one of the most innovative Peruvian cumbia bands at the time and a pioneer in the jungle cumbia genre. The band's members performed in headgear made from parrot feathers and cotton tunics, similar to the Shipibo people of Peru. In 1977, five of the band's members died in a plane crash.

== Discography ==
- El Gran Cacique (Infopesa, 1972, 2018)
- Masters of Chicha Vol. 1 (Barbès, 2008)
- Legado: Colección Definitiva (Infopesa, 2019)
