= Mi Gente =

2017 single by J. Balvin and Willy William

Single by J Balvin and Willy William

from the album Vibras
- Released: 30 June 2017
- Recorded: 2017
- Genre: Moombahton; reggaeton; dancehall
- Length: 3:09
- Label: Scorpio; Universal Latin
- Songwriters: José Osorio; Willy William; Adam Assad; Andrés David Restrepo; Mohombi Nzasi Moupondo
- Producers: Willy William; Phil Greiss

J Balvin singles chronology
"Bonita" (2017)	"Mi Gente" (2017)	"Sensualidad" (2017)

Willy William singles chronology
"Voodoo Song" (2017)	"Mi Gente" (2017)	"La La La" (2018)

Music video
- "Mi Gente" on YouTube

"Mi Gente" (transl. "My People") is a song recorded by Colombian singer J Balvin and French singer and producer Willy William. It was released on 30 June 2017 through Scorpio Music and Universal Music Latin. It is a remake of Willy William's song "Voodoo Song" which is an original French song by Willy William that went viral on Facebook in 2016 and released one year after. The single was serviced to United States contemporary hit radio on 18 July 2017. A remix version with American singer Beyoncé was released on 28 September 2017. J Balvin and Willy William released six more "Mi Gente" remixes on 20 October 2017 with Steve Aoki, Alesso, Cedric Gervais, Dillon Francis, Sunnery James & Ryan Marciano, and Henry Fong.

== Composition ==
"Mi Gente" is a reworking of Willy William's previous single "Voodoo Song" which was taken from Bangla song "Heila Duila Nach".

At 105 BPM, it is an uptempo moombahton song about ignoring barriers and just having fun while partying.

== Commercial performance ==
The original version topped the charts in most Latin American countries.

In the United States, the original version of the song peaked at number two on the Hot Latin Songs chart and at number 19 on the Billboard Hot 100.

In Canada, the remix version of the song featuring Beyonce peaked at number 2 on the Canadian Hot 100 and number 3 on the US Billboard Hot 100.

J Balvin and Willy William dropped six additional "Mi Gente" remixes with Steve Aoki, Alesso, Cedric Gervais, Dillon Francis, Sunnery James & Ryan Marciano, and Henry Fong.

== Music video ==
Directed by 36 Grados, the accompanying music video premiered on Vevo the same day of the single release. Leila Cobo from Billboard magazine described the video as "an explosion of color and dance" which features people from around the globe and that is all about unifying through music. It has many cameo appearances, including Italian millionaire Gianluca Vacchi.

As of February 2026, the music video has over 3.6 billion views on YouTube. The video won MTV Video Music Award for Best Latin at the 2018 MTV Video Music Awards.

== Controversy ==
Shortly after the song's release, many listeners noticed a strong resemblance to Pitbull's grito, first appearing at 0:52 on the record, and twice more throughout the duration of the 3:09 track. The issue became very mainstream, with many reporters falsely believing that the grito was by Pitbull, which it was not. Pitbull's first action was releasing an illegal remix to the record, including his own grito, titling the track "Mi Gente [Worldwide Remix]. After being released, many fans saw the striking resemblance between the two gritos being used. The Pitbull remix intentionally used both Pitbull's and that of the original track to show the similarity.

On 8 October 2019, Pitbull's legal team applied for a trademark on the popular "EEEEEEYOOOOOO!" grito, most popularly brought to market by Pitbull. On 17 April 2020, Pitbull was able to acquire a full trademark to the grito, thus becoming one of fewer than 250 owners of a trademark for solely a sound.

== Track listing ==
Digital download
No.	Title	Length
1.	"Mi Gente"	3:09

Remix
No.	Title	Length
1.	"Mi Gente" (Henry Fong Remix)	3:38

Remix
No.	Title	Length
1.	"Mi Gente" (Hardwell & Quintino Remix)	2:25

Remix
No.	Title	Length
1.	"Mi Gente" (Cedric Gervais Remix)	4:32

Remix
No.	Title	Length
1.	"Mi Gente" (Dillon Francis Remix)	3:28

Remix
No.	Title	Length
1.	"Mi Gente" (Steve Aoki Remix)	3:56

Remix
No.	Title	Length
1.	"Mi Gente" (Sunnery James & Ryan Marciano Remix)	3:58

Remix
No.	Title	Length
1.	"Mi Gente" (Alesso Remix)	3:36

== Charts ==
=== Weekly charts ===
Chart (2017–2019)	Peak position
Argentina (Monitor Latino)	2
Australia (ARIA)	27
Austria (Ö3 Austria Top 40)	4
Belarus Airplay (Eurofest)	6
Belgium (Ultratop 50 Flanders)	8
Belgium (Ultratop 50 Wallonia)	7
Bolivia (Monitor Latino)	1
Bulgaria Airplay (PROPHON)	2
Canada Hot 100 (Billboard)	2
Chile (Monitor Latino)	1
Colombia (National-Report)	2
Costa Rica (Monitor Latino)	2
Czech Republic Airplay (ČNS IFPI)	12
Czech Republic Singles Digital (ČNS IFPI)	1
Denmark (Tracklisten)	3
Dominican Republic (SODINPRO)	1
Dominican Republic (Monitor Latino)	2
Ecuador (Monitor Latino)	1
Ecuador (National-Report)	1
El Salvador (Monitor Latino)	1
Finland (Suomen virallinen lista)	3
France (SNEP)	10
Germany (GfK)	3
Guatemala (Monitor Latino)	1
Hungary (Single Top 40)	12
Hungary (Stream Top 40)	4
Ireland (IRMA)	4
Italy (FIMI)	1
Latin America (Monitor Latino)	1
Latvia (DigiTop100)	49
Lebanon Airplay (Lebanese Top 20)	12
Mexico (Monitor Latino)	1
Mexico (Billboard Mexican Airplay)	2
Mexico Streaming (AMPROFON)	1
Netherlands (Dutch Top 40)	1
Netherlands (Single Top 100)	1
New Zealand (Recorded Music NZ)	32
Norway (VG-lista)	11
Panama (Monitor Latino)	1
Paraguay (Monitor Latino)	1
Peru (Monitor Latino)	1
Philippines (Philippine Hot 100)	54
Poland Airplay (ZPAV)	36
Poland Dance (ZPAV)	2
Poland (Video Chart)	2
Portugal (AFP)	1
Romania (Media Forest)	2
Russia Airplay (Tophit)	3
Scotland Singles (Official Charts)	9
Serbia (Radiomonitor)	2
Slovakia Airplay (ČNS IFPI)	45
Slovakia Singles Digital (ČNS IFPI)	2
Slovenia (SloTop50)	28
Spain (PROMUSICAE)	1
Sweden (Sverigetopplistan)	4
Switzerland (Schweizer Hitparade)	4
UK Singles (Official Charts)	5
Uruguay (Monitor Latino)	1
US Billboard Hot 100	3
US Dance Club Songs (Billboard)	15
US Pop Airplay (Billboard)	18
US Rhythmic Airplay (Billboard)	2
Venezuela (Monitor Latino)	3
Venezuela (National-Report)	2
Venezuela (Record Report)	30

=== Year-end charts ===
Chart (2017)	Position
Argentina (Monitor Latino)	21
Australia (ARIA)	85
Austria (Ö3 Austria Top 40)	20
Belgium (Ultratop Flanders)	41
Belgium (Ultratop Wallonia)	56
Brazil (Pro-Música Brasil)	58
Canada (Canadian Hot 100)	35
Denmark (Tracklisten)	59
El Salvador (Monitor Latino)	1
France (SNEP)	34
Germany (Official German Charts)	15
Hungary (Single Top 40)	34
Hungary (Stream Top 40)	11
Israel (Media Forest)	13
Italy (FIMI)	17
Mexico (AMPROFON)	10
Netherlands (Dutch Top 40)	8
Netherlands (Single Top 100)	16
Portugal (AFP)	12
Romania (Airplay 100)	55
Spain (PROMUSICAE)	9
Sweden (Sverigetopplistan)	54
Switzerland (Schweizer Hitparade)	41
UK Singles (Official Charts Company)	51
US Billboard Hot 100	50
US Hot Latin Songs (Billboard)	2
US Latin Airplay (Billboard)	9
US Rhythmic (Billboard)	44

Chart (2018)	Position
Argentina (Monitor Latino)	36
Canada (Canadian Hot 100)	67
France (SNEP)	96
Germany (Official German Charts)	90
Portugal (AFP)	112
US Billboard Hot 100	99
US Hot Latin Songs (Billboard)	2
US Latin Airplay (Billboard)	15

=== Decade-end charts ===
Chart (2010–2019)	Position
US Hot Latin Songs (Billboard)	9

=== All-time charts ===
Chart (2021)	Position
US Hot Latin Songs (Billboard)	23

== Certifications ==
Region	Certification	Certified units/sales
Australia (ARIA)	5× Platinum	350,000^{‡}
Austria (IFPI Austria)	Gold	15,000^{‡}
Belgium (BRMA)	2× Platinum	40,000^{‡}
Brazil (Pro-Música Brasil)	4× Diamond	1,000,000^{‡}
Canada (Music Canada)	Diamond	800,000^{‡}
Denmark (IFPI Danmark)	2× Platinum	180,000^{‡}
France (SNEP)	Diamond	333,333^{‡}
Germany (BVMI)	2× Platinum	1,200,000^{‡}
Italy (FIMI)	5× Platinum	250,000^{‡}
Mexico (AMPROFON)	4× Diamond+Gold	1,230,000^{‡}
New Zealand (RMNZ)	3× Platinum	90,000^{‡}
Norway (IFPI Norway)	Platinum	40,000^{‡}
Poland (ZPAV)	4× Platinum	200,000^{‡}
Portugal (AFP)	2× Platinum	20,000^{‡}
Spain (Promusicae)	4× Platinum	160,000^{‡}
Spain (Promusicae) Steve Aoki Remix	3× Platinum	120,000^{‡}
Sweden (GLF)	3× Platinum	120,000^{‡}
Switzerland (IFPI Switzerland)	Platinum	20,000^{‡}
United Kingdom (BPI)	3× Platinum	1,800,000^{‡}
^{‡} Sales+streaming figures based on certification alone.

== Release history ==
Region	Date	Format	Version	Label	Ref.
Various	30 June 2017	Digital download	Original	Scorpio; Universal Latin	
Italy	14 July 2017	Contemporary hit radio	Original	Universal	
United States	18 July 2017	Contemporary hit radio	Original	Republic	
Various	20 October 2017	Digital download	Alesso Remix	Scorpio; Universal	
Various	20 October 2017	Digital download	Cedric Gervais Remix	Scorpio; Universal	
Various	20 October 2017	Digital download	Dillon Francis Remix	Scorpio; Universal	
Various	20 October 2017	Digital download	Henry Fong Remix	Scorpio; Universal	
Various	20 October 2017	Digital download	Steve Aoki Remix	Scorpio; Universal	
Various	20 October 2017	Digital download	Sunnery James & Ryan Marciano Remix	Scorpio; Universal	
Various	3 November 2017	Digital download	Hardwell & Quintino Remix	Scorpio; Universal	

== Beyoncé remix ==
"Mi Gente" (remix)

Single by J Balvin and Willy William featuring Beyoncé
- Language: Spanish; English
- English title: "My People"
- Released: September 28, 2017
- Studio: Jungle Studios (New York, NY)
- Genre: Reggaeton; moombahton; dancehall
- Length: 3:30
- Label: Universal Latin; Scorpio; Columbia; Parkwood
- Songwriters: J Balvin; Willy William; Mohombi DJ Assad; Andrés David Restrepo; Terius Nash; Beyoncé (add.)
- Producers: Willy William; Beyoncé (add.)

Beyoncé singles chronology
"Shining" (2017)	"Mi Gente" (remix) (2017)	"Walk on Water" (2017)

Music video
- "Mi Gente" (remix) on YouTube

On 28 September 2017, a remix version featuring vocals by American singer Beyoncé was released on digital stores and streaming services. The remix was released as a single by Universal Music Latin, Republic Records, Columbia Records, and Parkwood Entertainment. Beyoncé donated all proceeds from the song to hurricane relief charities in Mexico, Puerto Rico, and other Caribbean islands. Balvin and William stated Beyoncé was the "top choice" for the remix, and had no expectation of her agreeing to the song when they reached out to her.

Beyoncé would later perform the song in her set in Coachella in 2018. For the second weekend, Balvin joined her on stage and sung the remix with Beyoncé. In 2019, the audiovisual recording was included in the singer's live album Homecoming: The Live Album.

This song was also part of the set list for the singer's OTR II tour. The song was added to the set list at the show in Manchester on 13 June 2018, at Etihad Stadium.

=== Commercial performance ===
Upon the release of the remixed version of the song featuring Beyoncé, the song reached number one on the Hot Latin Songs chart, ending the 35-week reign led by "Despacito", becoming Balvin's fourth number one on the Hot Latin Songs chart, as well as Beyoncé's highest-charting song on the chart after "Irreplaceable" peaked at number four and "Beautiful Liar" peaked at number 10 in 2007. On the Hot 100, the remix moved from number 21 to number three after a full tracking week, giving both Balvin and William their first top 10 single and Beyoncé her 17th top 10 single (27th with Destiny's Child) on the chart. The remix also reached number one in the US Digital Songs chart with 79,000 copies sold during that week (combined sales with the original version), becoming both Balvin and William's first number one song on that respective chart, and Beyoncé's sixth, as well as just the second mostly-Spanish sung song to top the chart after "Despacito". This made "Mi Gente", alongside "Despacito", as the first time in the Hot 100 chart history for two non-English singles to appear in the top 10 simultaneously.

In Canada, the remix reached a new peak of number two on the Canadian Hot 100, behind Post Malone and 21 Savage's "Rockstar", becoming both Balvin and William's highest-charting single at the time, and Beyoncé's 13th top 10 single. It also moved from number 17 to number one on the Hot Digital Songs chart.

The remix also peaked at number one in many European and Latin American countries, including Argentina, Hungary, Mexico, the Netherlands, Bolivia, Panama, Paraguay, Costa Rica, and peaked at number 11 in Australia.

=== Music video ===
A music video was also released on YouTube featuring American producer Diplo, French DJ David Guetta, Dutch DJ Martin Garrix, Dutch DJ Tiësto, Venezuelan YouTuber Lele Pons, Brazilian soccer player Neymar, Brazilian singer Anitta, Colombian singer El Llane, Portuguese footballer Cristiano Ronaldo and several fan made videos.

=== Critical reception ===
The version featuring Beyoncé was named "Best New Track" by Pitchfork with Matthew Ismael Ruiz stating that the song "is about a shared cultural pride, one that transcends borders and race, from J Balvin's native Colombia to Puerto Rico and across all of Latinidad. It's a declaration that "El mundo nos quiere" (The world wants us) set to a head-nod bop. Beyoncé gets this, and with this remix, she backs up her words with action. This is what solidarity sounds like." Randall Roberts from Los Angeles Times wrote that: "To say Beyoncé lends a hand in the remix is an understatement. Unlike guests who limit their contributions to a single late-track verse or hook, Beyoncé upends "Mi Gente" from the first verse and proceeds to bilingually maneuver through the rhythmic, up-tempo jam like the queen she is."

In 2019, Pitchfork listed Mi Gente (Remix) at number 189 on their greatest songs of the decade (2010s) list.

=== Awards and nominations ===
Year	Ceremony	Award	Result	Ref
2018	ASCAP Latin Awards	Most Performed Songs	Won	
2018	Billboard Music Awards	Top Latin Song	Nominated	
2018	Billboard Latin Music Awards	Hot Latin Song of the Year	Nominated	
2018	Billboard Latin Music Awards	Hot Latin Song of the Year, Vocal Event	Nominated	
2018	Billboard Latin Music Awards	Airplay Song of the Year	Nominated	
2018	Billboard Latin Music Awards	Digital Song of the Year	Nominated	
2018	Billboard Latin Music Awards	Streaming Song of the Year	Nominated	
2018	Billboard Latin Music Awards	Latin Rhythm Song of the Year	Won	
2018	iHeartRadio Music Awards	Best Remix	Nominated	
2018	Latin American Music Awards	Song of the Year	Nominated	
2018	Latin American Music Awards	Favorite Urban Song	Nominated	
2018	Latin Grammy Awards	Best Urban Fusion/Performance	Nominated	
2018	MTV Millennial Awards	Hit of the Year	Nominated	

=== Track listing ===
Digital download
No.	Title	Length
1.	"Mi Gente" (featuring Beyoncé)	3:29

=== Weekly charts ===
Weekly chart performance for "Mi Gente (Beyoncé Remix)"
Chart (2017–18)	Peak position
Argentina (Monitor Latino)	1
Australia (ARIA)	11
Austria (Ö3 Austria Top 40)	4
Belgium (Ultratop 50 Flanders)	8
Belgium (Ultratop 50 Wallonia)	7
Bolivia (Monitor Latino)	1
Canada Hot 100 (Billboard)	2
Canada CHR/Top 40 (Billboard)	13
Colombia (National-Report)	1
Chile (Monitor Latino)	1
Costa Rica (Monitor Latino)	1
Dominican Republic (Monitor Latino)	1
Ecuador (Monitor Latino)	1
Ecuador (National-Report)	1
El Salvador (Monitor Latino)	1
Germany (GfK)	3
Guatemala (Monitor Latino)	1
Hungary (Rádiós Top 40)	7
Hungary (Dance Top 40)	2
Hungary (Single Top 40)	2
Hungary (Stream Top 40)	1
Latin America (Monitor Latino)	1
Malaysia (RIM)	17
Mexico (Monitor Latino)	1
Mexico (Billboard Mexican Airplay)	1
Mexico Streaming (AMPROFON)	1
Netherlands (Dutch Top 40)	1
Netherlands (Single Top 100)	1
New Zealand (Recorded Music NZ)	39
Panama (Monitor Latino)	1
Paraguay (Monitor Latino)	1
Peru (Monitor Latino)	1
Poland Airplay (ZPAV)	49
Portugal (AFP)	34
Spain (Promusicae)	15
Sweden (Sverigetopplistan)	32
Switzerland (Schweizer Hitparade)	16
US Billboard Hot 100	3
US Dance Club Songs (Billboard)	15
US Hot Latin Songs (Billboard)	1
US Latin Airplay (Billboard)	1
US Pop Airplay (Billboard)	18
US Rhythmic Airplay (Billboard)	2
Uruguay (Monitor Latino)	1
Venezuela (Monitor Latino)	3
Venezuela (National-Report)	1

=== Year-end charts ===
Year-end chart performance for "Mi Gente (Beyoncé Remix)" in 2017
Chart (2017)	Position
Argentina (Monitor Latino)	21
Australia (ARIA)	85
Austria (Ö3 Austria Top 40)	20
Belgium (Ultratop Flanders)	41
Belgium (Ultratop Wallonia)	56
Bolivia (Monitor Latino)	7
Canada (Canadian Hot 100)	35
Chile (Monitor Latino)	11
Colombia (Monitor Latino)	2
Costa Rica (Monitor Latino)	2
Denmark (Tracklisten)	59
Ecuador (Monitor Latino)	3
El Salvador (Monitor Latino)	1
Germany (Official German Charts)	15
Guatemala (Monitor Latino)	3
Honduras (Monitor Latino)	5
Hungary (Dance Top 40)	38
Hungary (Single Top 40)	34
Hungary (Stream Top 40)	11
Israel (Media Forest)	13
Italy (FIMI)	17
México (AMPROFON)	10
Netherlands (Single Top 100)	16
Nicaragua (Monitor Latino)	4
Panama (Monitor Latino)	4
Paraguay (Monitor Latino)	4
Peru (Monitor Latino)	4
Romania (Airplay 100)	55
Sweden (Sverigetopplistan)	54
Switzerland (Schweizer Hitparade)	41
UK Singles (Official Charts Company)	51
Uruguay (Monitor Latino)	7
US Billboard Hot 100	50
US Hot Latin Songs (Billboard)	2
US Rhythmic (Billboard)	44
US Hot Latin Rhythmic Songs (Billboard)	1

Chart (2018)	Position
Canada (Canadian Hot 100)	67
Hungary (Dance Top 40)	5
US Billboard Hot 100	99
US Hot Latin Songs (Billboard)	2
Venezuela (Monitor Latino)	21

Chart (2019)	Position
Hungary (Dance Top 40)	27

=== Certifications ===
Certifications for "Mi Gente (Beyoncé Remix)"
Region	Certification	Certified units/sales
Australia (ARIA)	3× Platinum	210,000^{‡}
Brazil (Pro-Música Brasil) Homecoming Live Version	Gold	30,000^{‡}
Denmark (IFPI Danmark)	Gold	45,000^{‡}
France (SNEP)	Platinum	200,000^{‡}
New Zealand (RMNZ)	Gold	15,000^{‡}
Portugal (AFP)	Gold	5,000^{‡}
Spain (Promusicae)	Gold	20,000^{‡}
United States (RIAA)	68× Platinum (Latin)	4,080,000^{‡}
^{‡} Sales+streaming figures based on certification alone.

=== Release history ===
Region	Date	Format	Label	Ref.
Various	28 September 2017	Digital download	Universal Latin; Scorpio; Columbia; Parkwood	
Italy	29 September 2017	Contemporary hit radio	Universal	
United Kingdom	13 October 2017	Urban contemporary radio	Polydor	
United Kingdom	20 October 2017	Contemporary hit radio	Polydor	

== See also ==
- List of number-one songs of 2017 (Colombia)
- List of number-one hits of 2017 (Italy)
- List of number-one songs of 2017 (Mexico)
- List of Mexico Airplay number-one singles from the 2010s
- List of Dutch Top 40 number-one singles of 2017
- List of number-one singles of 2017 (Spain)
- List of most liked YouTube videos
- List of most-viewed YouTube videos
- List of number-one hits of 2017 (Argentina)
- List of airplay number-one hits of the 2010s (Argentina)
- List of Billboard Hot Latin Songs and Latin Airplay number ones of 2017
- List of Billboard Hot Latin Songs and Latin Airplay number ones of 2018
