= List of number-one singles of 2017 (Spain) =

This lists the singles that reached number one on the Spanish Promusicae sales and airplay charts in 2017. Total sales correspond to the data sent by regular contributors to sales volumes and by digital distributors.

== Chart history ==
Week	Issue date	Top streaming, downloads & physical sales			Most airplay		
Week	Issue date	Artist(s)	Song	Ref.	Artist(s)	Song	Ref.
1	January 5	Shakira featuring Maluma	"Chantaje"		DJ Snake featuring Justin Bieber	"Let Me Love You"	
2	January 12	Shakira featuring Maluma	"Chantaje"		Clean Bandit featuring Sean Paul and Anne-Marie	"Rockabye"	
3	January 19	Luis Fonsi featuring Daddy Yankee	"Despacito"		Clean Bandit featuring Sean Paul and Anne-Marie	"Rockabye"	
4	January 26	Luis Fonsi featuring Daddy Yankee	"Despacito"		Clean Bandit featuring Sean Paul and Anne-Marie	"Rockabye"	
5	February 2	Luis Fonsi featuring Daddy Yankee	"Despacito"		Clean Bandit featuring Sean Paul and Anne-Marie	"Rockabye"	
6	February 9	Luis Fonsi featuring Daddy Yankee	"Despacito"		Clean Bandit featuring Sean Paul and Anne-Marie	"Rockabye"	
7	February 16	Luis Fonsi featuring Daddy Yankee	"Despacito"		Luis Fonsi featuring Daddy Yankee	"Despacito"	
8	February 23	Luis Fonsi featuring Daddy Yankee	"Despacito"		Luis Fonsi featuring Daddy Yankee	"Despacito"	
9	March 2	Luis Fonsi featuring Daddy Yankee	"Despacito"		Luis Fonsi featuring Daddy Yankee	"Despacito"	
10	March 9	Luis Fonsi featuring Daddy Yankee	"Despacito"		Clean Bandit featuring Sean Paul and Anne-Marie	"Rockabye"	
11	March 16	Luis Fonsi featuring Daddy Yankee	"Despacito"		Luis Fonsi featuring Daddy Yankee	"Despacito"	
12	March 23	Luis Fonsi featuring Daddy Yankee	"Despacito"		Luis Fonsi featuring Daddy Yankee	"Despacito"	
13	March 30	Luis Fonsi featuring Daddy Yankee	"Despacito"		Enrique Iglesias featuring Descemer Bueno and Zion & Lennox	"Súbeme la radio"	
14	April 6	Luis Fonsi featuring Daddy Yankee	"Despacito"		Ed Sheeran	"Shape of You"	
15	April 13	Luis Fonsi featuring Daddy Yankee	"Despacito"		Enrique Iglesias featuring Descemer Bueno and Zion & Lennox	"Súbeme la radio"	
16	April 20	Luis Fonsi featuring Daddy Yankee	"Despacito"		Katy Perry featuring Skip Marley	"Chained to the Rhythm"	
17	April 27	Luis Fonsi featuring Daddy Yankee	"Despacito"		Ed Sheeran	"Shape of You"	
18	May 4	Luis Fonsi featuring Daddy Yankee	"Despacito"		Luis Fonsi featuring Daddy Yankee	"Despacito"	
19	May 11	Luis Fonsi featuring Daddy Yankee	"Despacito"		Luis Fonsi featuring Daddy Yankee	"Despacito"	
20	May 18	Luis Fonsi featuring Daddy Yankee	"Despacito"		Katy Perry featuring Skip Marley	"Chained to the Rhythm"	
21	May 25	Luis Fonsi featuring Daddy Yankee	"Despacito"		Clean Bandit featuring Zara Larsson	"Symphony"	
22	June 1	Luis Fonsi featuring Daddy Yankee	"Despacito"		Luis Fonsi featuring Daddy Yankee	"Despacito"	
23	June 8	Luis Fonsi featuring Daddy Yankee	"Despacito"		Clean Bandit featuring Zara Larsson	"Symphony"	
24	June 15	Luis Fonsi featuring Daddy Yankee	"Despacito"		Kaleo	"Way Down We Go"	
25	June 22	Luis Fonsi featuring Daddy Yankee	"Despacito"		Kaleo	"Way Down We Go"	
26	June 29	Luis Fonsi featuring Daddy Yankee	"Despacito"		Charlie Puth	"Attention"	
27	July 6	Luis Fonsi featuring Daddy Yankee	"Despacito"		Charlie Puth	"Attention"	
28	July 13	Luis Fonsi featuring Daddy Yankee	"Despacito"		Charlie Puth	"Attention"	
29	July 20	J Balvin and Willy William	"Mi Gente"		Julia Michaels	"Issues"	
30	July 27	J Balvin and Willy William	"Mi Gente"		Charlie Puth	"Attention"	
31	August 3	J Balvin and Willy William	"Mi Gente"		Charlie Puth	"Attention"	
32	August 10	J Balvin and Willy William	"Mi Gente"		Efecto Pasillo	"Carita de buena"	
33	August 17	J Balvin and Willy William	"Mi Gente"		Charlie Puth	"Attention"	
34	August 24	J Balvin and Willy William	"Mi Gente"		Clean Bandit featuring Zara Larsson	"Symphony"	
35	August 31	J Balvin and Willy William	"Mi Gente"		Robin Schulz featuring James Blunt	"OK"	
36	September 7	J Balvin and Willy William	"Mi Gente"		Robin Schulz featuring James Blunt	"OK"	
37	September 14	Becky G featuring Bad Bunny	"Mayores"		Robin Schulz featuring James Blunt	"OK"	
38	September 21	Nacho	"Bailame"		Robin Schulz featuring James Blunt	"OK"	
39	September 28	Nacho	"Bailame"		Robin Schulz featuring James Blunt	"OK"	
40	October 5	Nacho	"Bailame"		Robin Schulz featuring James Blunt	"OK"	
41	October 12	Nacho	"Bailame"		Robin Schulz featuring James Blunt	"OK"	
42	October 19	Nacho	"Bailame"		Pink	"What About Us"	
43	October 26	Natti Natasha featuring Ozuna	"Criminal"		Robin Schulz featuring James Blunt	"OK"	
44	November 2	Natti Natasha featuring Ozuna	"Criminal"		Pablo Alborán	"No Vaya a Ser"	
45	November 9	Natti Natasha featuring Ozuna	"Criminal"		Pablo Alborán	"No Vaya a Ser"	
46	November 16	Bad Bunny, Prince Royce and J Balvin featuring Mambo Kingz and DJ Luian	"Sensualidad"		Pablo Alborán	"No Vaya a Ser"	
47	November 23	Bad Bunny, Prince Royce and J Balvin featuring Mambo Kingz and DJ Luian	"Sensualidad"		Portugal. The Man	"Feel It Still"	
48	November 30	Luis Fonsi featuring Demi Lovato	"Échame la Culpa"		Portugal. The Man	"Feel It Still"	
49	December 7	Luis Fonsi featuring Demi Lovato	"Échame la Culpa"		Camila Cabello featuring Young Thug	"Havana"	
50	December 14	Luis Fonsi featuring Demi Lovato	"Échame la Culpa"		Ed Sheeran with Beyoncé	"Perfect Duet"	
51	December 21	Luis Fonsi featuring Demi Lovato	"Échame la Culpa"		Ed Sheeran with Beyoncé	"Perfect Duet"	
52	December 28	Luis Fonsi featuring Demi Lovato	"Échame la Culpa"		Camila Cabello featuring Young Thug	"Havana"	
