= Deja Vu (Prince Royce and Shakira song) =

2017 song by Prince Royce and Shakira

Single by Prince Royce and Shakira

from the album Five
- Released: February 24, 2017
- Recorded: 2016
- Studio: RedLab11 MIA (Florida); Calpio Studios (New York, NY); Propriedad Urbana Studios (New York, NY)
- Genre: Bachata; R&B
- Length: 3:16
- Label: Sony Latin
- Songwriters: Geoffrey Rojas; Daniel Santacruz; Manny Cruz

Prince Royce singles chronology
"Moneda" (2017)	"Deja Vu" (2017)	"Ganas Locas" (2017)

Shakira singles chronology
"Chantaje" (2016)	"Deja Vu" (2017)	"Comme moi" (2017)

Music video
- "Deja Vu" on YouTube

"Deja Vu" is a song by American singer Prince Royce and Colombian singer-songwriter Shakira. The song was released on February 24, 2017 as the fourth single taken from Royce's fifth studio album, Five. The song was also included on Shakira's album El Dorado.

In 2023, the song experienced a resurgence in popularity after becoming a viral hit on TikTok, increasing in streams on Spotify and entering the daily chart in North America.

== Music video ==
The music video for "Deja Vu" was directed by Jaume de la Iguana. Cinematography was handled by Xavi Giménez. It was premiered on March 24, 2017 on Prince Royce's Vevo account on YouTube. The music video has surpassed over 500 million views on the platform.

== Accolades ==
Year	Ceremony	Award	Result
2017	Latin American Music Awards	Song of the Year	Won
2017	Latin American Music Awards	Favorite Tropical Song	Won
2017	Latin Grammy Awards	Best Tropical Song	Nominated
2017	Teen Choice Awards	Choice Latin Song	Nominated
2018	Billboard Latin Music Awards	Tropical Song of the Year	Won

== Live performances ==
Shakira performed "Deja Vu" with Prince Royce at The Temple House in Miami in the release party for El Dorado on 25 May 2017.

== Charts ==
=== Weekly charts ===
Chart (2017)	Peak position
Argentina (Monitor Latino)	16
Chile (Monitor Latino)	8
Colombia (National-Report)	26
Dominican Republic (Monitor Latino)	1
Ecuador (National-Report)	26
France (SNEP)	106
Guatemala (Monitor Latino)	2
Latin America (Monitor Latino)	9
Mexico (Mexico Español Airplay)	26
Peru (Monitor Latino)	4
Spain (Promusicae)	4
Switzerland (Schweizer Hitparade)	92
US Bubbling Under Hot 100 (Billboard)	7
US Hot Latin Songs (Billboard)	4
US Latin Airplay (Billboard)	3
US Tropical Airplay (Billboard)	1
Venezuela (National-Report)	1

=== Year-end charts ===
Chart (2017)	Position
Argentina (Monitor Latino)	35
Bolivia (Monitor Latino)	21
Chile (Monitor Latino)	48
Guatemala (Monitor Latino)	15
Panama (Monitor Latino)	64
Peru (Monitor Latino)	10
Spain (PROMUSICAE)	50
Uruguay (Monitor Latino)	74
US Hot Latin Songs (Billboard)	13

=== All time charts ===
Chart (All time)	Position
US Tropical Songs (Billboard)	12

== Certifications ==
Region	Certification	Certified units/sales
Brazil (Pro-Música Brasil)	Platinum	60,000^{‡}
Canada (Music Canada)	Gold	40,000^{‡}
Italy (FIMI)	Gold	25,000^{‡}
Mexico (AMPROFON)	Diamond+Platinum	360,000^{‡}
Spain (Promusicae)	3× Platinum	180,000^{‡}
United States (RIAA)	15× Platinum (Latin)	900,000^{‡}
^{‡} Sales+streaming figures based on certification alone.
