= Moneda (song) =

Single by Prince Royce with Gerardo Ortiz

from the album Five
- Released: October 7, 2016
- Length: 3:06
- Label: Sony Latin
- Songwriters: Geoffrey Rojas; Daniel Santacruz; Alejandro Jaén
- Producers: Prince Royce; D'Lesly "Dice" Lora; Alison Berger

Prince Royce singles chronology
"La Carretera" (2016)	"Moneda" (2016)	"Deja Vu" (2017)

Gerardo Ortiz singles chronology
"Moneda" (2016)

"Moneda" (transl. "Coin") is a 2016 song by American singer Prince Royce and Mexican singer Gerardo Ortiz. The song was released on October 7, 2016 as the third single taken from Royce's fifth studio album, Five (2017).

The music video premiered on October 28, 2016.

== Charts ==
Chart (2016–17)	Peak position
US Hot Latin Songs (Billboard)	22
US Latin Airplay (Billboard)	14
US Tropical Airplay (Billboard)	1

== Certifications ==
Region	Certification	Certified units/sales
United States (RIAA)	3× Platinum (Latin)	180,000^{‡}
^{‡} Sales+streaming figures based on certification alone.
