= List of number-one songs of 2017 (Colombia) =

This is a list of the National-Report Top 100 Nacional number-one songs of 2017. Chart rankings are based on radio play and are issued weekly. The data is compiled monitoring radio stations through an automated system in real-time.

== Number ones by week ==
Week	Issue date	Song	Artist(s)	Ref.
1	December 30	"Ya no me duele más"	Silvestre Dangond	
2	January 6	"Ya no me duele más"	Silvestre Dangond	
3	January 13	"Ya no me duele más"	Silvestre Dangond	
4	January 20	"Ya no me duele más"	Silvestre Dangond	
5	January 27	"Hermosa ingrata"	Juanes	
6	August 24	"Mi gente"	J Balvin & Willy William	
