= Muévelo (Sofía Reyes song) =

Single by Sofía Reyes featuring Wisin

from the album Louder!
- Released: August 22, 2014
- Recorded: 2014
- Genre: Latin pop
- Label: Warner Music Latina
- Songwriters: Sofia Reyes; Tobias Gad; Marissa Jack; Eritza Laues; Juan Luis Morera; Rickey Offord; Edwin Serrano

Sofia Reyes singles chronology
"Muévelo" (2014)	"Conmigo (Rest of Your Life)" (2015)

Wisin singles chronology
"Control" (2014)	"Muévelo" (2014)	"Me Marcharé" (2015)

"Muévelo" ([ˈmweβelo], "Move It") is a song by Mexican singer Sofía Reyes featuring Puerto Rican rapper and singer Wisin. It was Reyes' debut single, and it was released digitally via the iTunes Store by Warner Music Latina on August 22, 2014.

== Track listing ==
- Digital download
1. "Muévelo" - 3:32

== Charts ==
Chart (2015)	Peak position
Mexico (Billboard Mexican Airplay)	18
Spain (Promusicae)	13
US Hot Latin Songs (Billboard)	25
US Latin Pop Airplay (Billboard)	18
US Latin Airplay (Billboard)	40

== Certifications ==
Region	Certification	Certified units/sales
Spain (Promusicae)	Platinum	40,000^{‡}
United States (RIAA)	Platinum (Latin)	60,000^{‡}
^{‡} Sales+streaming figures based on certification alone.
