= Sofía Reyes =

Mexican singer

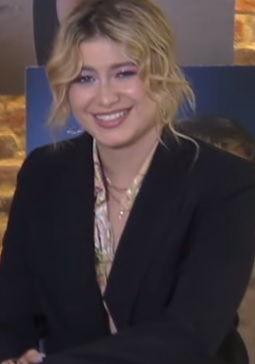
- Reyes in 2022

Background information
- Born: Úrsula Sofía Reyes Piñeyro; 25 September 1995 (age 31); Monterrey, Nuevo León, Mexico
- Genres: Pop; Latin-pop
- Occupations: Singer; songwriter
- Years active: 2011–present
- Label: Warner Music Latina
- Website: sofiareyes.com

Úrsula Sofía Reyes Piñeyro (born 25 September 1995) is a Mexican singer and songwriter. She rose to fame in 2018 with her song "1,2,3", which featured Jason Derulo and De La Ghetto. In 2019, she released the song "R.I.P." with Brazilian singer Anitta and Albanian singer Rita Ora. For "R.I.P.", Reyes won a Latin American Music Award and a LOS40 Music Award.

== Career ==
Reyes was born in the northern Mexican city of Monterrey, Nuevo León, and started singing and playing piano when she was ten. She began uploading videos of herself covering songs on YouTube two years later. Her videos managed to capture the interest of many, including Latin American singer Prince Royce, who went on to sign Reyes with his then newly created music label D'León Records at the age of 12. As the first ever singer to be signed to the label which Royce created in partnership with Warner Music Latina to "support other young talent in their development", Reyes launched her debut single "Now Forever", featuring American rapper Khleo Thomas in 2013.

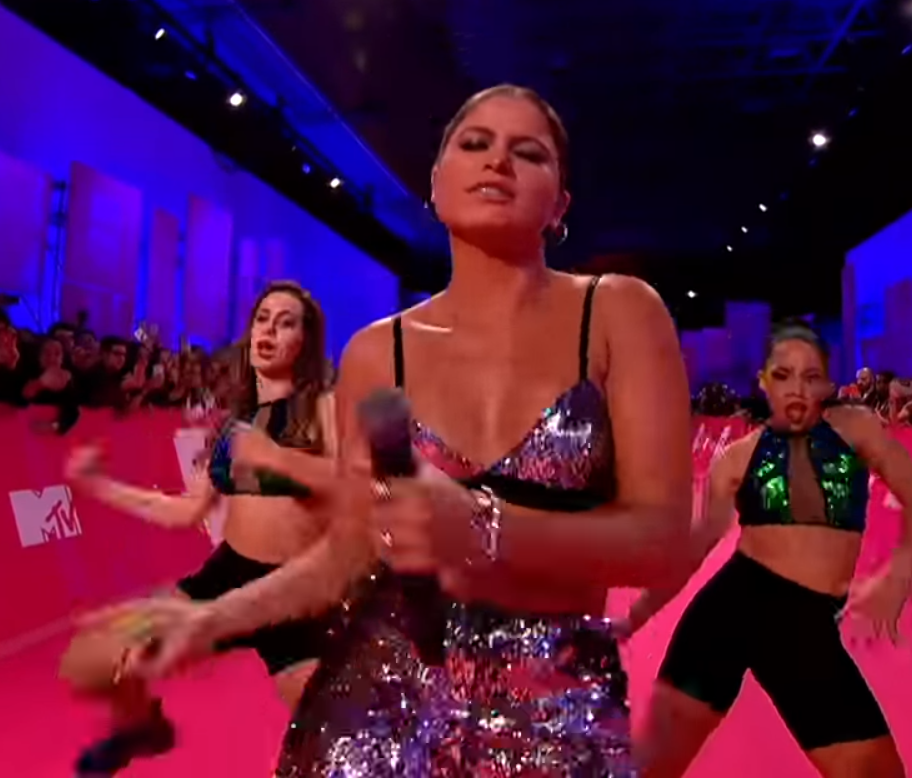
Reyes performs "1, 2, 3" at the 2018 MTV European Music Awards in Bilbao

Reyes collaborated with Puerto Rican singer Wisin and German producer Toby Gad to co-write the single "Muévelo", which was released in August 2014. Her subsequent single "Conmigo (Rest of Your Life)" was launched the following year. The music video for the latter song sees American singer/actor Kendall Schmidt of Big Time Rush and Heffron Drive making an appearance as Reyes' love interest on a secluded beach. In early 2016, Sofia released her third single "Solo Yo", a heartfelt ballad and her first singing collaboration with mentor Prince Royce. Both are featured in the official music video. She released a song called "1, 2, 3" along with Jason Derulo and De la Ghetto. In March 2019, Sofia released the song "R.I.P.", featuring Rita Ora and Anitta. In May 2019, Spanish singer Beret released a duet version of his song "Lo siento" (English: I'm sorry) featuring Reyes.

On 6 March 2020, Reyes collaborated with American singer-songwriter Lauv, for the song "El Tejano" off Lauv's debut album, How I'm Feeling. On 19 May, the music video was released for the song, featuring Reyes singing on stage at a Mexican restaurant. On 26 April 2020, she collaborated with Michael Bublé and the Barenaked Ladies on "Gotta Be Patient" by Stay Homas featuring Judit Nedderman, for the Canadian benefit concert Stronger Together, Tous Ensemble in support of Food Banks Canada, healthcare and front-line workers during the COVID-19 pandemic, and in memory of the 2020 Nova Scotia attacks. On 12 May 2023, Reyes released the single "How You Samba" alongside Kris Kross Amsterdam and British rapper Tinie Tempah.

== Discography ==
- Louder! (2017)
- Mal de Amores (2022)
- Milamores (2023)

== Awards ==
| Year | Award | Category | Work | Result |
|---|---|---|---|---|
| 2015 | Premios Juventud | Revelación Juvenil | Sofía Reyes | Nominated |
| 2016 | Premio Lo Nuestro | New Artist of the Year | Sofía Reyes | Nominated |
| 2017 | Latin Grammy Award | Best New Artist | Sofía Reyes | Nominated |
| 2017 | MTV Millennial Awards | Instacrush | Sofía Reyes | Nominated |
| 2017 | MTV Millennial Awards | Best New Artist | Sofía Reyes | Nominated |
| 2017 | MTV Millennial Awards | Pop explosion of the year | Sofía Reyes | Won |
| 2017 | MTV Europe Music Award | Best Latin America North Act | Sofía Reyes | Nominated |
| 2018 | MTV Europe Music Award | Best Latin America North Act | Sofía Reyes | Nominated |
| 2018 | Nickelodeon Mexico Kids' Choice Awards | National Artist | Sofía Reyes | Nominated |
| 2018 | Nickelodeon Mexico Kids' Choice Awards | Chico y Chica Trendy | Sofía Reyes | Nominated |
| 2018 | Nickelodeon Mexico Kids' Choice Awards | Favorit Hit | "1 , 2, 3" | Nominated |
| 2018 | Nickelodeon Argentina Kids' Choice Awards | Favorit Hit | "1 , 2, 3" | Nominated |
| 2019 | Latin American Music Awards | Favorite Video | "R.I.P." | Won |
| 2019 | LOS40 Music Awards | Video of the Year Award | "R.I.P." | Won |
| 2019 | Premios Juventud | Sick Dance Routine (Best Choreography) | "R.I.P." | Nominated |
| 2019 | MTV Millennial Awards | Music-Ship of the Year | "R.I.P." | Nominated |
| 2021 | Berlin Music Video Awards | Best Art Director | A tu Manera (Corbata) | Nominated |
