= Daniel Santacruz =

American singer

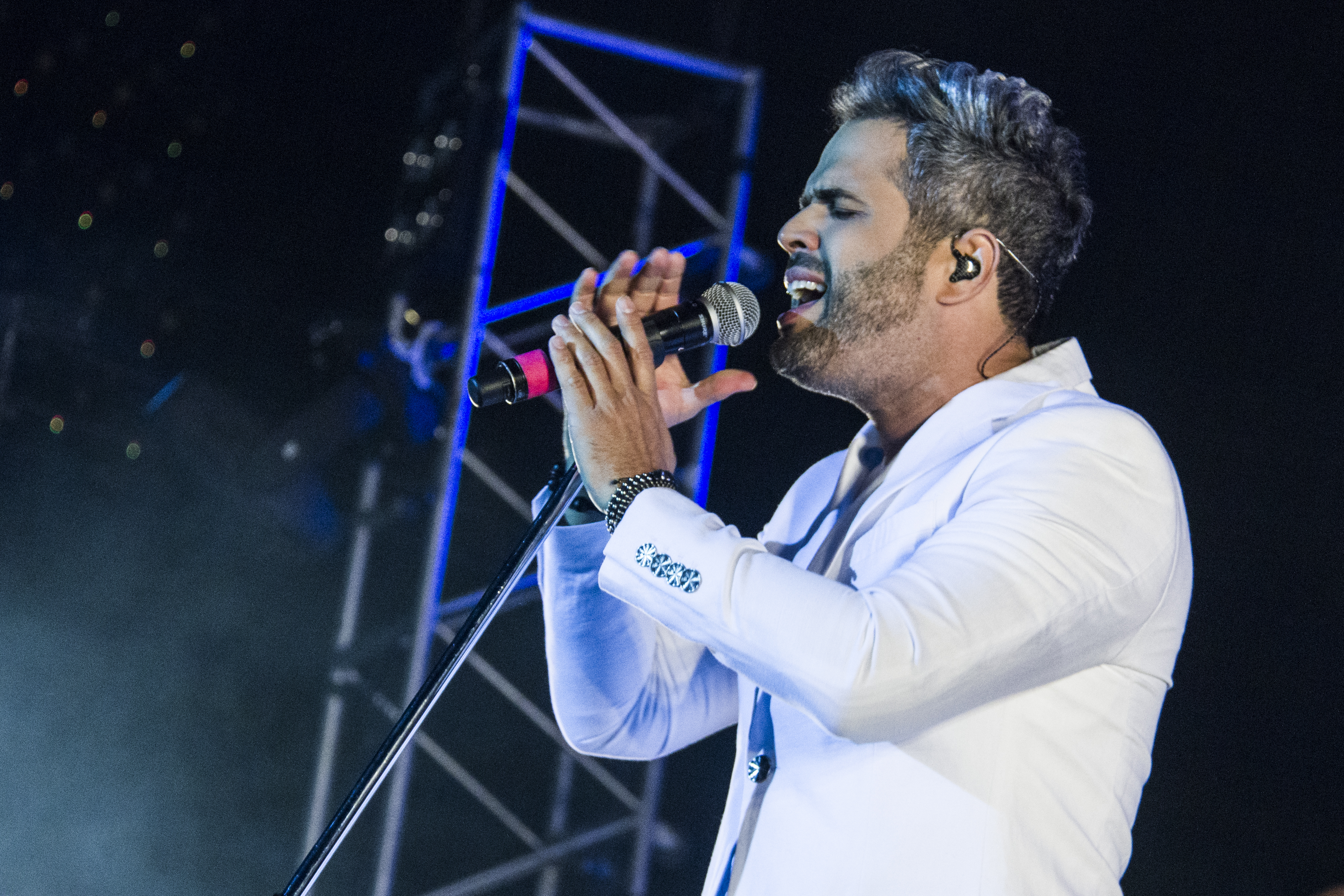

Background information
- Born: November 23, 1976 (age 49); New Jersey, U.S.
- Genres: Bachata; Merengue; Kizomba; tropical; Latin pop
- Occupations: Musician; singer; songwriter
- Instruments: Vocals; guitar
- Years active: 1996–present
- Label: Penluis Music
- Website: danielsantacruz.com

Daniel Santacruz (born November 23, 1976) is an American singer. Born in New Jersey and raised in the Dominican Republic to a Cuban father and a Dominican mother, Santacruz is a Latin Grammy Award winner.

== Early years ==
His musical influences range from Wilfrido Vargas, Fernando Villalona, Sergio Vargas and Juan Luis Guerra to Luis Miguel, Elvis Presley, Julio Iglesias and The Doors, although Santacruz has cited that his biggest musical influence was his mother, who from an early age used to sing boleros to him and also used to make imaginary interviews to a young Daniel with a small tape recorder. His father, also a music lover, introduced him to classical music and to the 1950s and 1960s sound. The first musical notes are known from his maternal grandmother Ana Zulema Victoria who was a pianist and also a piano teacher.

== Career ==
His career began in 1996 as a member of various bands in the Dominican Republic including Massa and Rikarena . During that time Santacruz found to have writing skills and bought his first guitar. In this period he also participated in studio recordings as a background singer for other artists, and also for radio and TV commercials. In 2000 he was part of the MQV Church choir for two years next to Juan Luis Guerra, who is the musical director of the church.

In 2003 together with Ambiorix Francisco, Santacruz produced his first solo album: Por un beso, earning a nomination for Premio Lo Nuestro as Best New Artist.

From 2004 to 2007 Santacruz took a break from the stage and started writing and producing for other artists.

At the end of 2008 his second album Radio Rompecorazones is released, produced by himself with Alejandro Jaen. The single "Adónde va el amor?" along with the album achieved two Latin Grammy Award nominations in 2009, Best Contemporary Tropical Album and Best Tropical Song. Both the single and the album received an incredible support in the United States, Latin America and Europe.

History repeats itself in 2011 when his third album Bachata Stereo produced again with Jaén in collaboration with Richy Rojas, with just two months on the market receives again a nomination in the Latin Grammy Award for Best Contemporary Tropical Album

His song "Lento", a sensual Kizomba fusion which has a video with the Kizomba dancer sensation: Sara Lopez, has more than 100 million views in Youtube.

In 2016 his album "Toda La Vida" (a tribute for Mexican singer Emmanuel) got a nomination for The Latin Grammy Award for Best Contemporary Tropical Album and the song "La Carretera" co-written with Prince Royce got a nomination as well for best Tropical song.

His album "Momentos De Cine" (2018), also nominated for a Latin Grammy, included the tracks Desnudos, Contando Minutos and Casablanca.

In 2020 Santacruz released his 7th studio album "Larimar" named after Dominican Republic's precious blue stone. "Larimar" won the Latin Grammy for Best Merengue/Bachata album category.

== Songwriter ==
Daniel Santacruz is considered a hit maker, since 2004 Santacruz has written top charting songs for artists such as Prince Royce (Incondicional, Soy El Mismo, Culpa Al Corazón, La Carretera), Shakira (Deja Vu feat Prince Royce), Ha*Ash (Me Gustas Tu), Hector Acosta (Tu veneno, Aprenderé, No moriré, Ojala), Toby Love (Lejos), Reik (Me duele amarte), Monchy y Alexandra (Perdidos, No es una novela), Leslie Grace, Victor Manuel, Charlie Cruz, José Feliciano, Milly Quezada, Andy Andy among others.

Since 2004, Daniel has received 12 ASCAP awards (American Society of Composers, Authors and Publishers), 3 Billboards, 2 Latin American Music Awards, and 3 Premio Lo Nuestro for the songs "Perdidos" and "No Es Una Novela" (performed by the famous Dominican duet Monchy y Alexandra), and "Soy El Mismo" performed Prince Royce besides 6 Latin Grammy nominations for 3 of his own albums and some of his songs. In 2018 Santacruz received the Dominican Republic Soberano Award for Songwriter of the Year for second time in a row.

== Discography ==
- Por un Beso 2003
- Radio Rompecorazones 2008
- Bachata Stereo 2011
- Lo Dice la Gente 2014
- Toda la Vida 2016
- Momentos De Cine 2018
- Larimar 2020 (Latin Grammy Winner)

== Personal life ==
Daniel Santacruz is married to Ana Mariela Gonzalez and have three children including Penélope Santacruz who is also a singer and collaborated with Daniel in the song "Mi Estrellita De Algodón from the album "Larimar", and his son Luis Daniel who is a producer and artist as well. Daniel Santacruz is the brother of singer Manny Cruz.
