= Cúrame =

Cúrame may refer to:

- "Cúrame" (Prince Royce song), 2019
- "Cúrame" (Rauw Alejandro song), 2021
