= 2020s in Latin music =

Major events and trends in Latin music in the 2020s

- 2010s ^{.} 2020s in Latin music

For Latin music from a year in the 2020s, go to 20 | 21 | 22 | 23 | 24 | 25

This article includes an overview of the major events and trends in Latin music in the 2020s, namely in Ibero-America (including Spain and Portugal). This includes the rise and fall of various subgenres in Latin music from 2020 to 2029.

== Overview ==
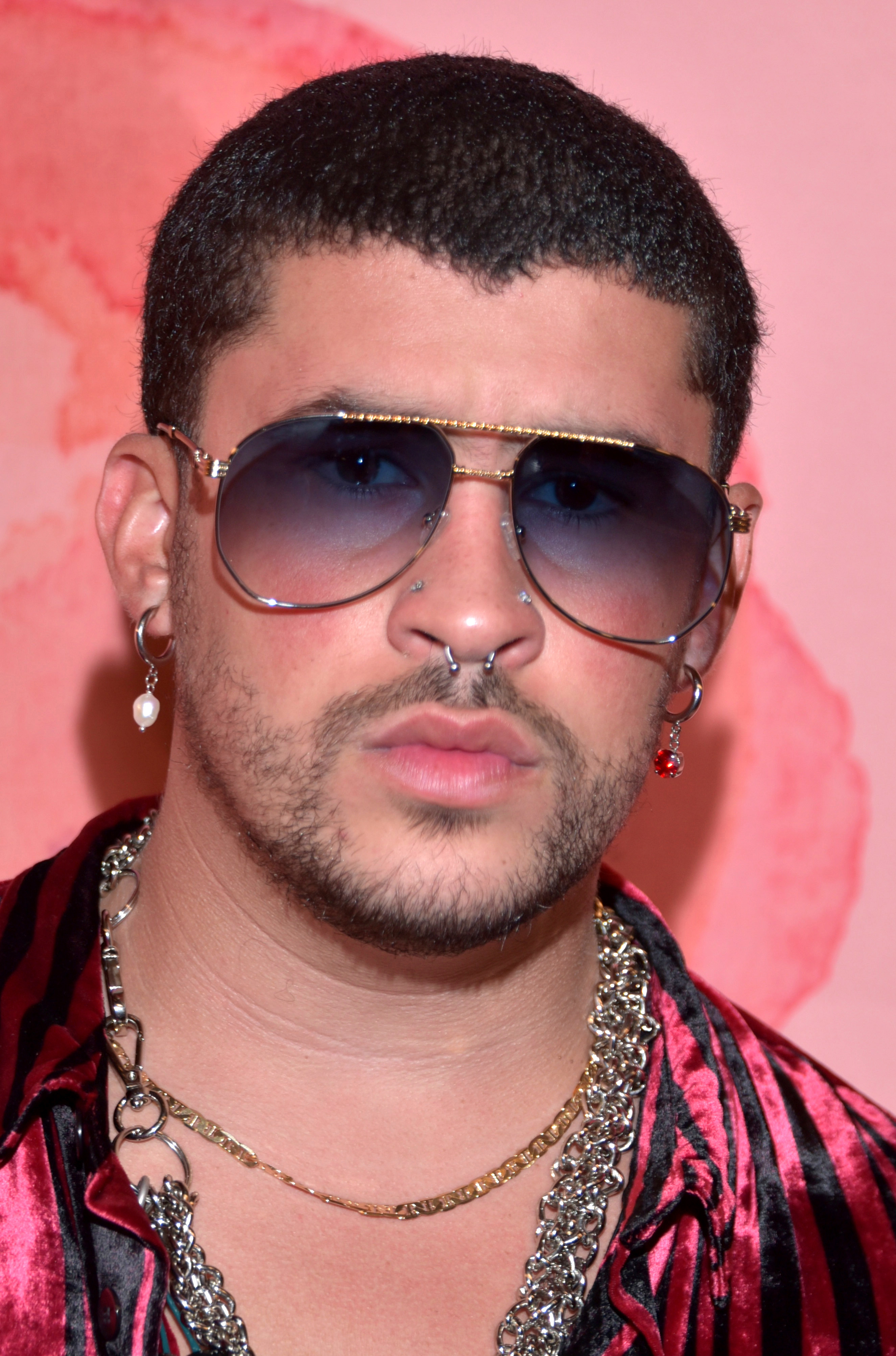
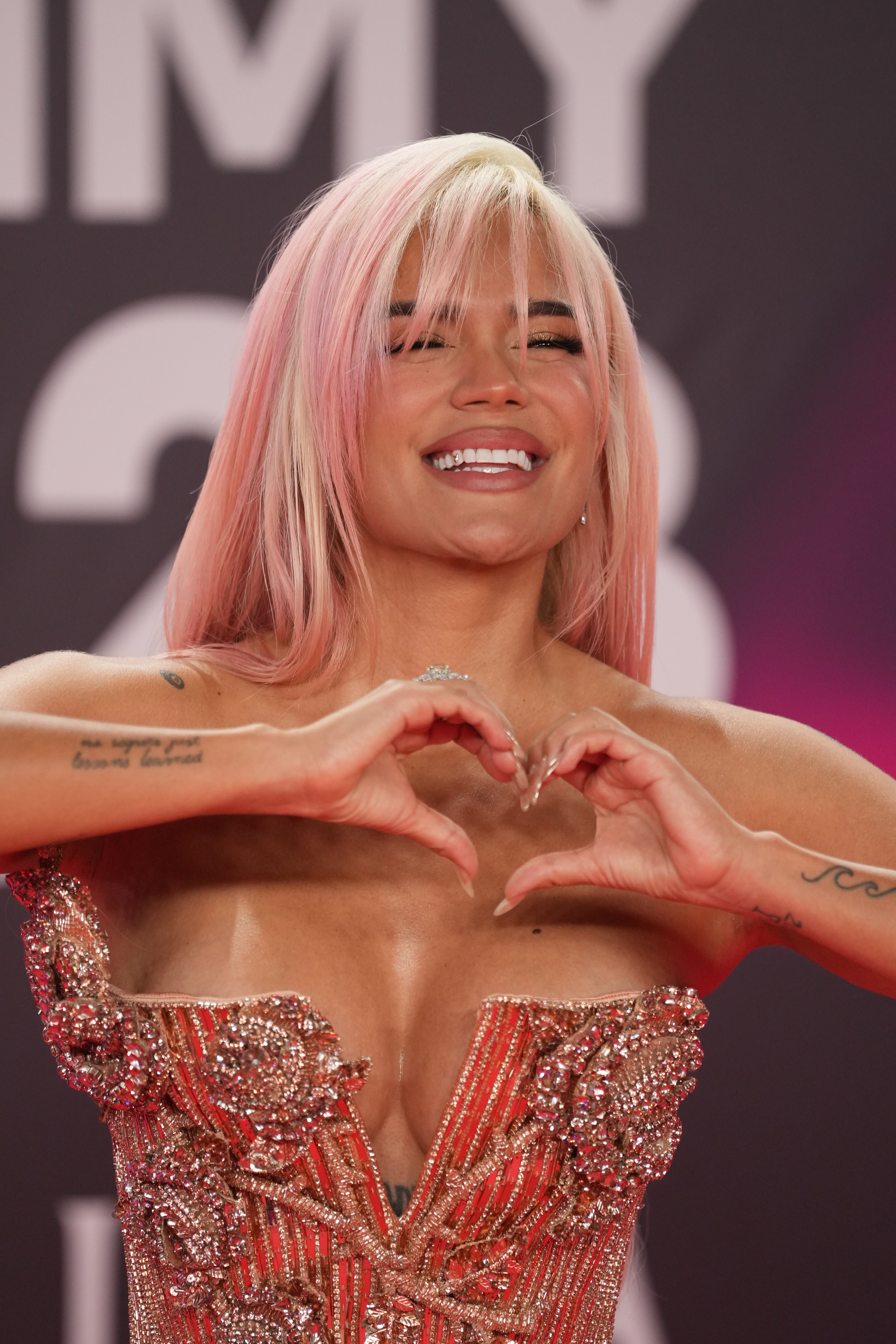
Bad Bunny and Karol G became the first and second artists to top the Billboard 200 with an all Spanish-language album, respectively.

As of 2024, revenue in Latin music has grown into $1.4 billion. The Recording Industry Association of America (RIAA) reported in 2020 that Latin music is growing faster than the overall music market in America. In 2020, Puerto Rican rapper Bad Bunny became the first artist to have an all-Spanish album to top the Billboard 200 chart with El Último Tour Del Mundo. The follow-up studio album, Un Verano Sin Ti (2022), also topped the Billboard 200 and led to Bad Bunny being the first Latin artist to receive IFPI Global Chart Award. Colombian singer Karol G became the first female Latin artist to top the Billboard 200 with an all-Spanish album in 2023 with Mañana Será Bonito.

=== Latin pop ===
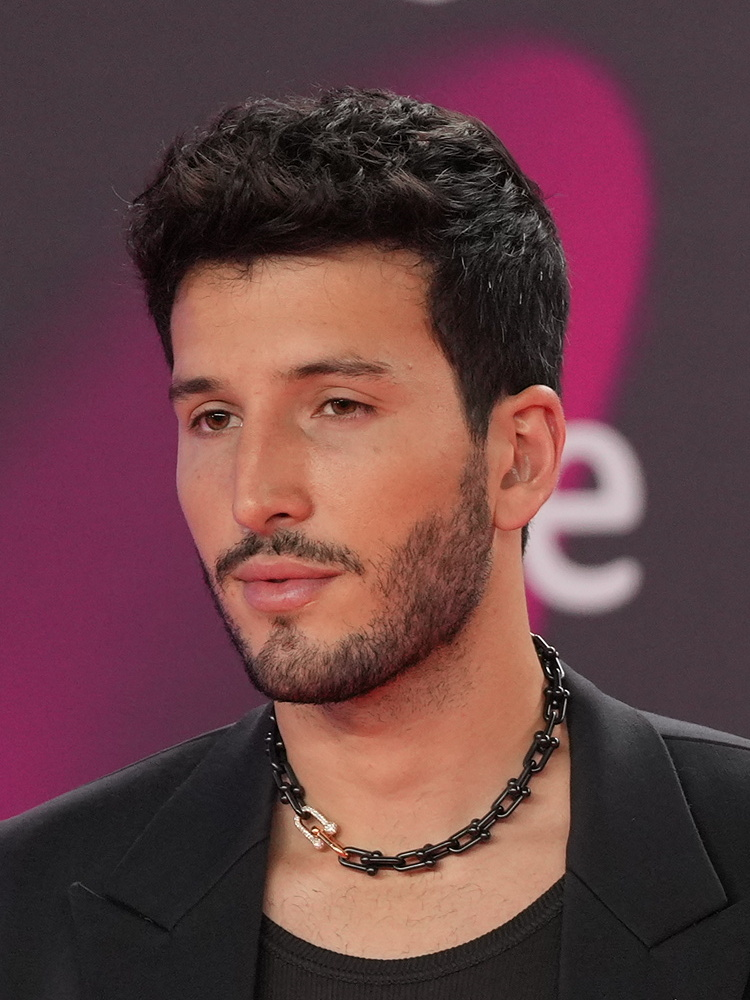
Sebastián Yatra, one of the current leading Latin pop artists, won the Latin Grammy Award for Best Pop Song with "Tacones Rojos"

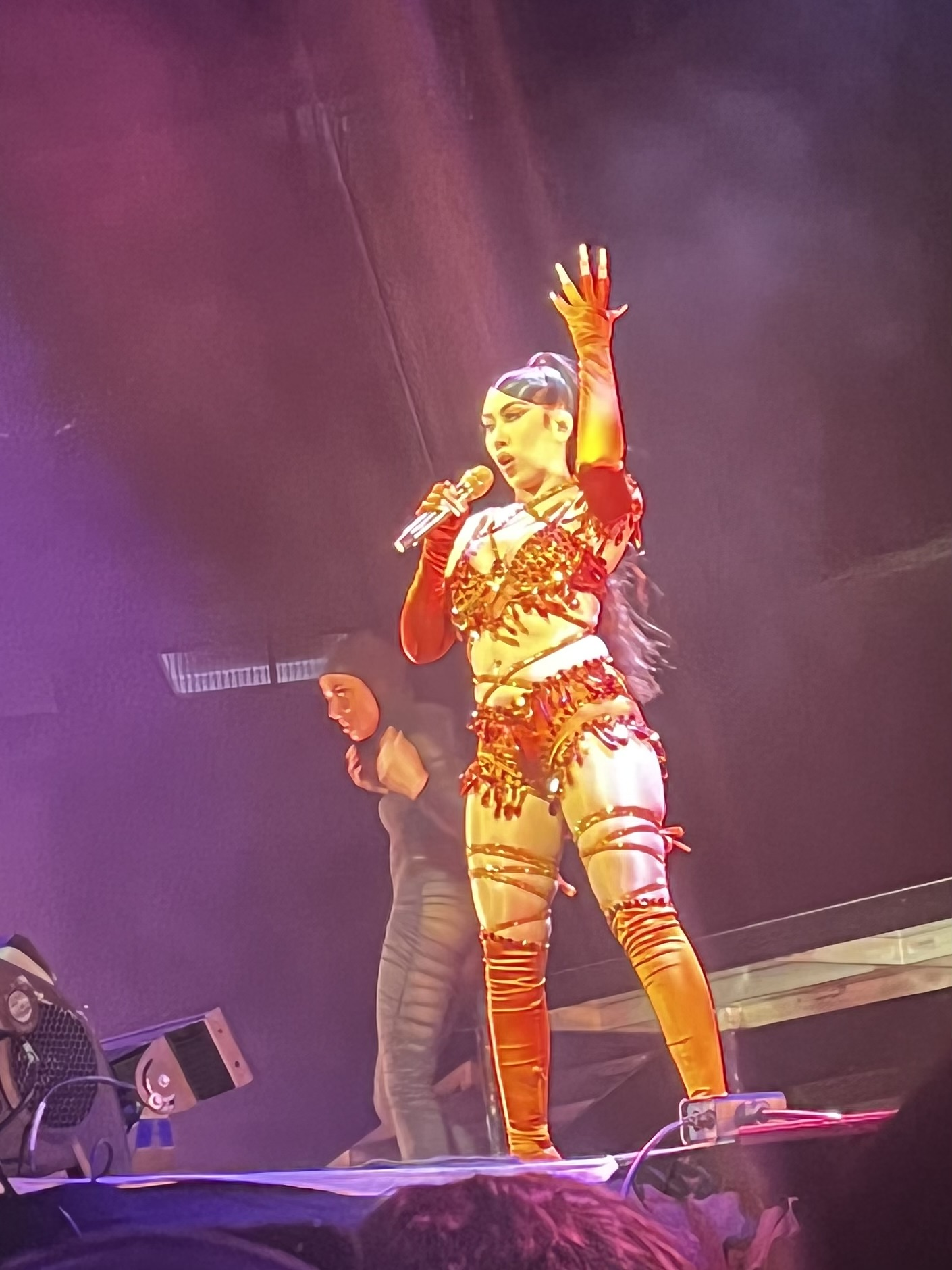
Kali Uchis, a bilingual Latin pop artist, had a global hit with "Telepatía".

Up-tempo/rhythmic Latin pop music continues to be popular in the Latin pop with songs such as "Tacones Rojos" by Sebastián Yatra, "Todo de Ti" by Rauw Alejandro, and "Telepatía" by Kali Uchis. The genre borrows influences from other pop genres such as synth-pop and disco. "Todo de Ti" spent 28 weeks on top of the Latin Pop Airplay chart, becoming the second-most longest-running number one on the chart. "Telepatía" became a global bilingual hit, peaking at number 10 on the Billboard Global 200 chart. Popetón also continues to be popular with artists such as Camilo.

=== Regional Mexican ===
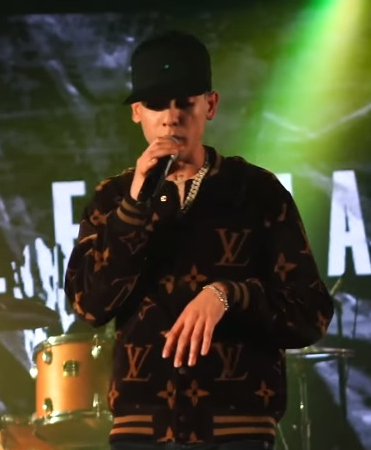
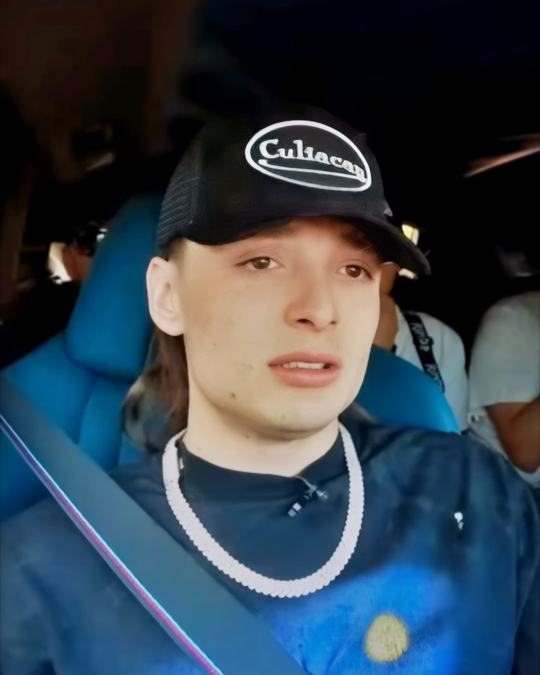
Natanael Cano and Peso Pluma are one of the pioneers of the corridos tumbados movement. Peso Pluma had a global hit with "Ella Baila Sola"

Corridos tumbados became a meteoric global success with artists such as Grupo Firme, Natanael Cano, Peso Pluma, Eslabon Armado as it movement's forefront. "Ella Baila Sola" became a global hit by reaching number one on the Billboard Global 200 chart and was crowned Global Song of the Summer by Spotify.

=== Tropical ===
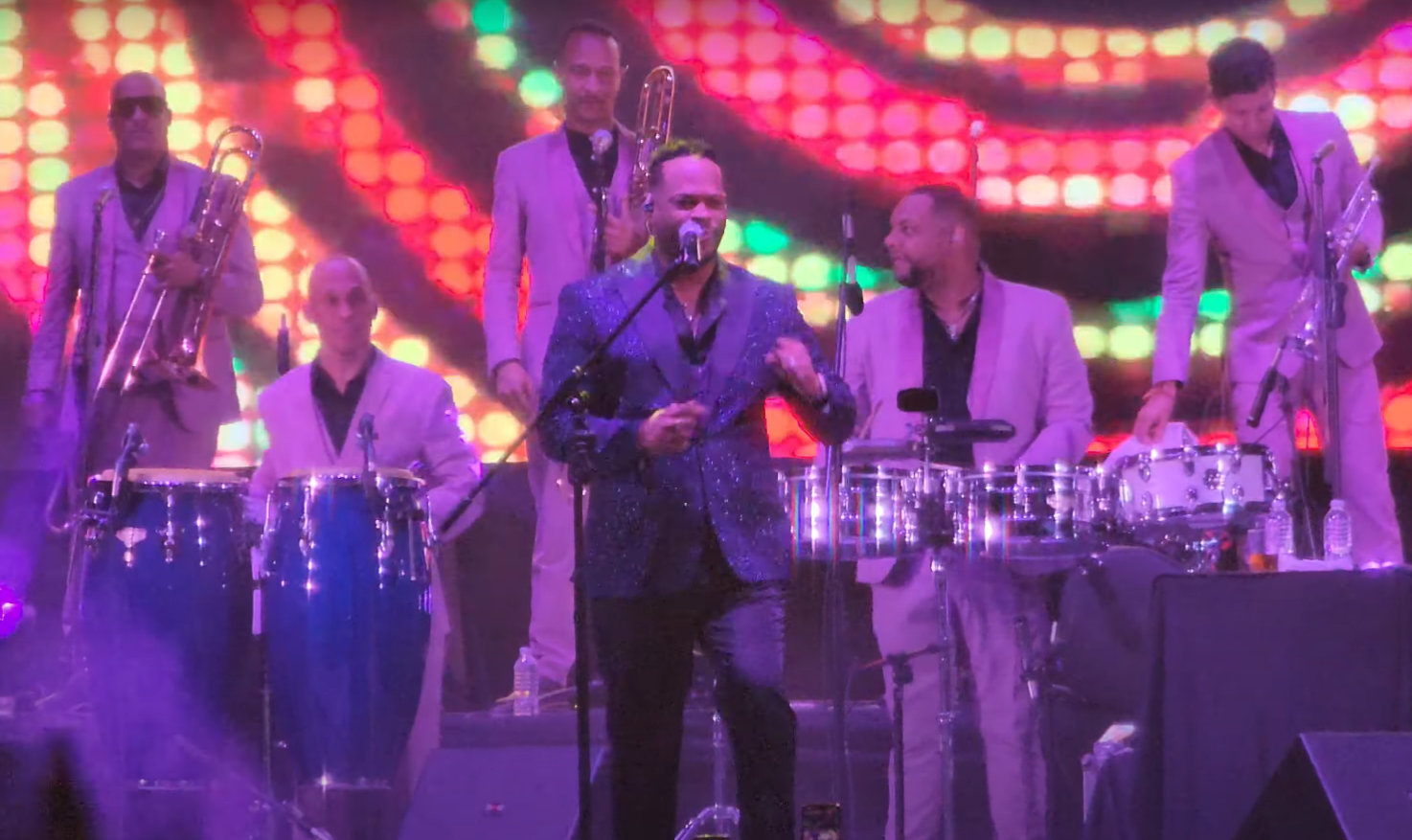
Dominican salsa continues to be popular with artists such as Yiyo Sarante.

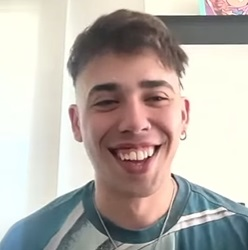
Luck Ra brought the popularity of Argentine's cuarteto and cumbia outside of its native country

Bachata and cumbia villera continue to be tropical music's popular genres. Prince Royce broke the record on the Tropical Airplay chart for the most weeks at number with "Carita de Inocente". Romeo Santos and Marc Anthony also continues to be popular in the bachata and salsa fields, respectively. Salsa from the Dominican Republic has become successful with artists such as Yiyo Sarante. The popularity of cumbia villera fuses with other urbano music genres such as Latin trap and reggaeton. Non tropical artists such as Manuel Turizo and Rosalía have popularized the bachata and merengue genres with songs such as "Despechá", "La Fama", and "La Bachata". Reparto, a genre from Cuban which mixes with urban sounds gained popularity in the mid-2020s.

=== Urbano/reggaeton ===
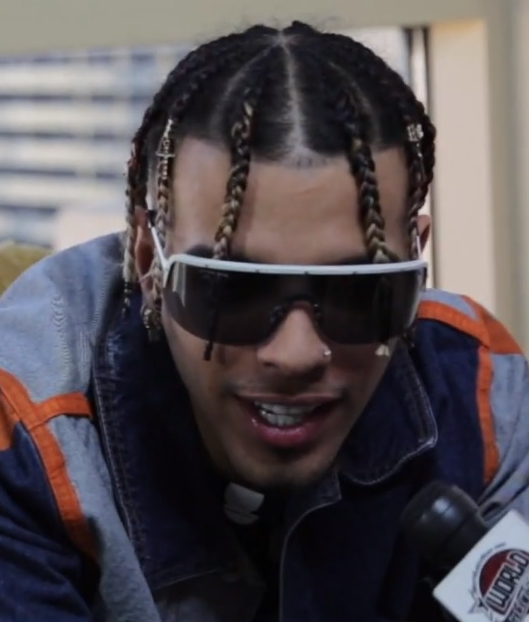
Rauw Alejandro represents one of the newer faces of reggaeton/Latin trap genres.

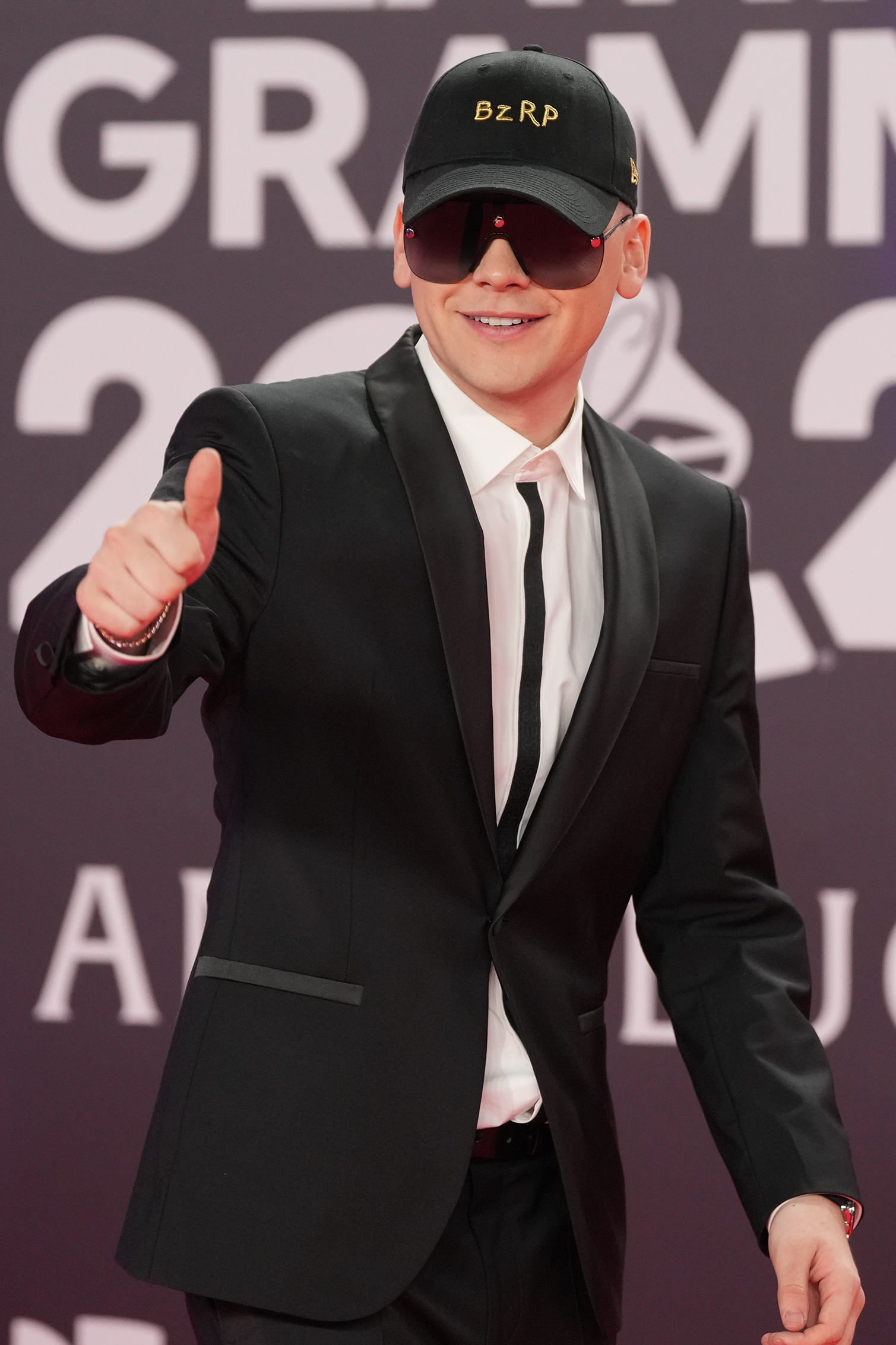
Bizarrap became successful with his collaborations with other urbano artists.

Reggaeton and Latin trap still remain relevant in the urbano field. Bad Bunny became an international global star with the aforementioned El Último Tour Del Mundo and Un Verano Sin Ti. Rauw Alejandro has recognized as the newer faces of the urbano movement. Farruko popularized the guaracha genre with "Pepas". Argentine DJ Bizarrap became famous for his collaborations with other urbano artists on his BZRP sessions. His collaboration with Shakira won the Latin Grammy Award for Song of the Year in 2023.

=== Latin rock/alternative ===
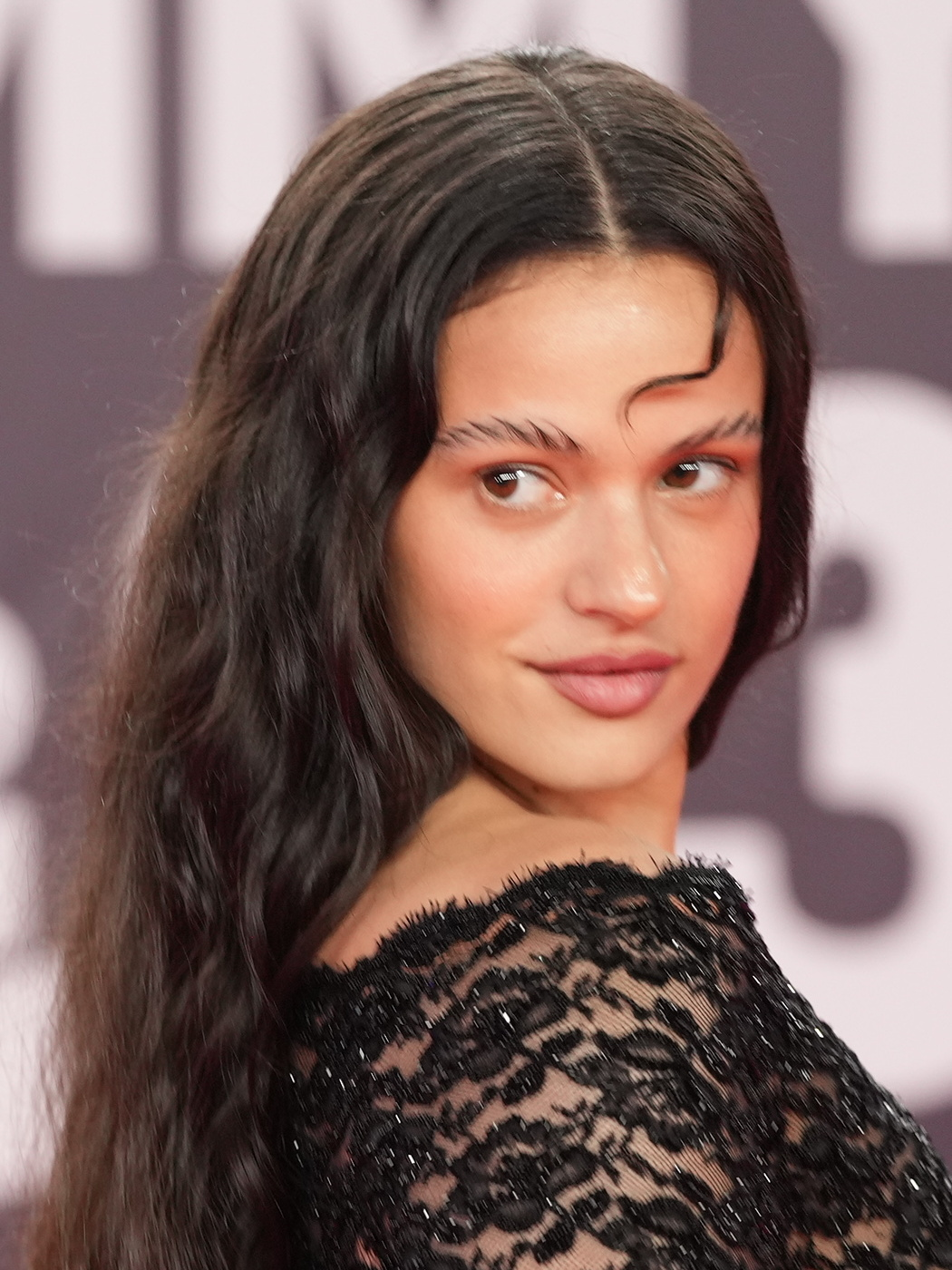
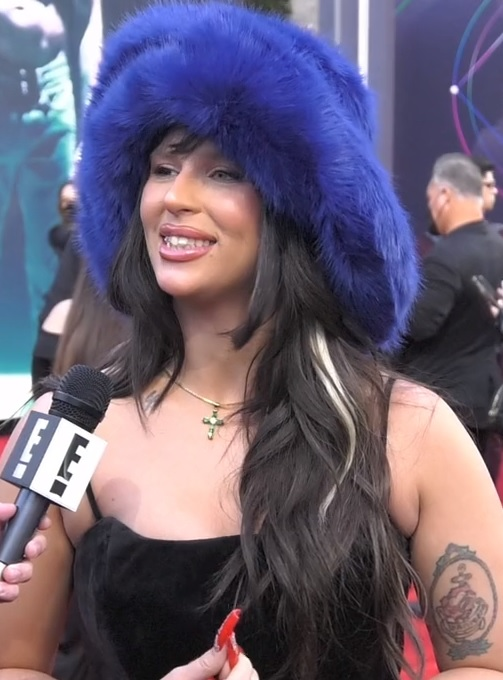
Rosalía and Nathy Peluso became popular for their alternative take on urbano music.

Rosalía became popular with her alternative take on both flamenco and reggaeton. Her 2022 album, Motomami, became the most-acclaimed album of the year and won the Latin Grammy Award for Album of the Year. Other Latin alternative artists include Nathy Peluso. Mexican rock band Maná continues to remain relevant by re-recording their hits with other artists.

=== Brazilian/Portuguese ===
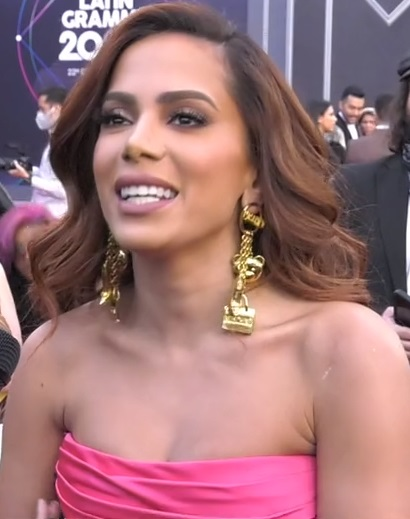
Anitta brought the popularity of funk carioca outside of its native Brazil.

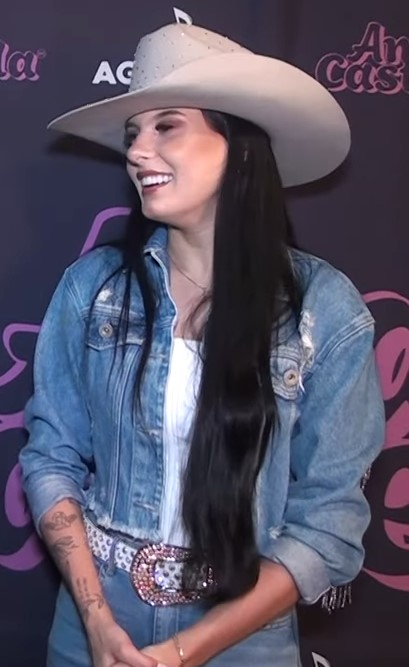
Sertaneja singer Ana Castela spent over a year at number-one on the Billboard Artistas 25 chart.

The funk carioca continues to be popular in Brazil with artists such as Anitta, Ludmilla, Luísa Sonza, and Iza. Anitta also crossed over to the Spanish-language market and had a global hit with "Envolver". Sertanejo is still popular in Brazil with Ana Castela topping the Artistas 25 chart for over a year.

== See also ==
- 2020s in music
