= 2010s in Latin music =

Major events and trends in Latin music in the 2010s

- 2000s ^{.} 2010s in Latin music ^{.} 2020s

For Latin music from a year in the 2010s, go to 10 | 11 | 12 | 13 | 14 | 15 | 16 | 17 | 18 | 19

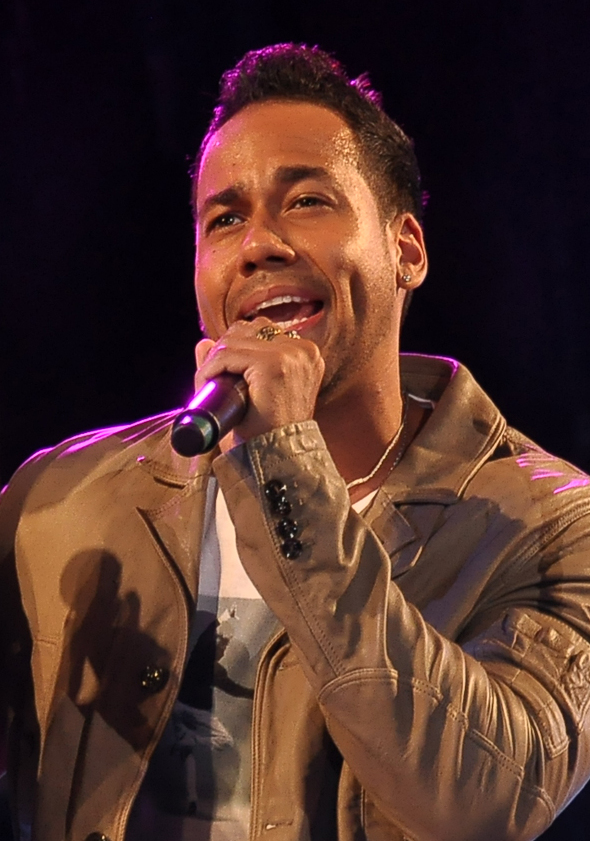
Romeo Santos was named Top Latin Artist of the 2010s by Billboard.

This article includes an overview of the major events and trends in Latin music in the 2010s, namely in Ibero-America (including Spain and Portugal). This includes the rise and fall of various subgenres in Latin music from 2010 to 2019.

== Overview ==
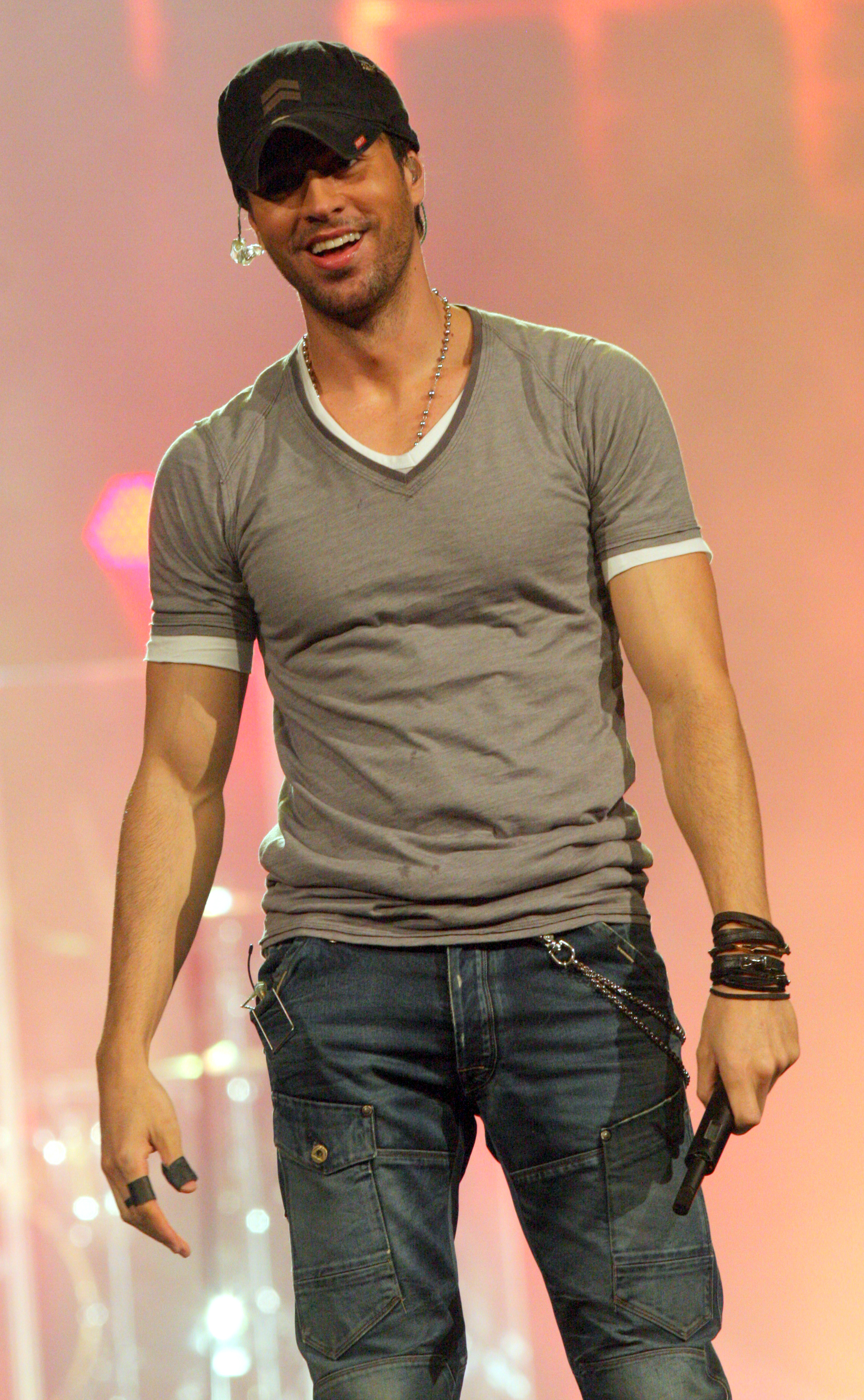
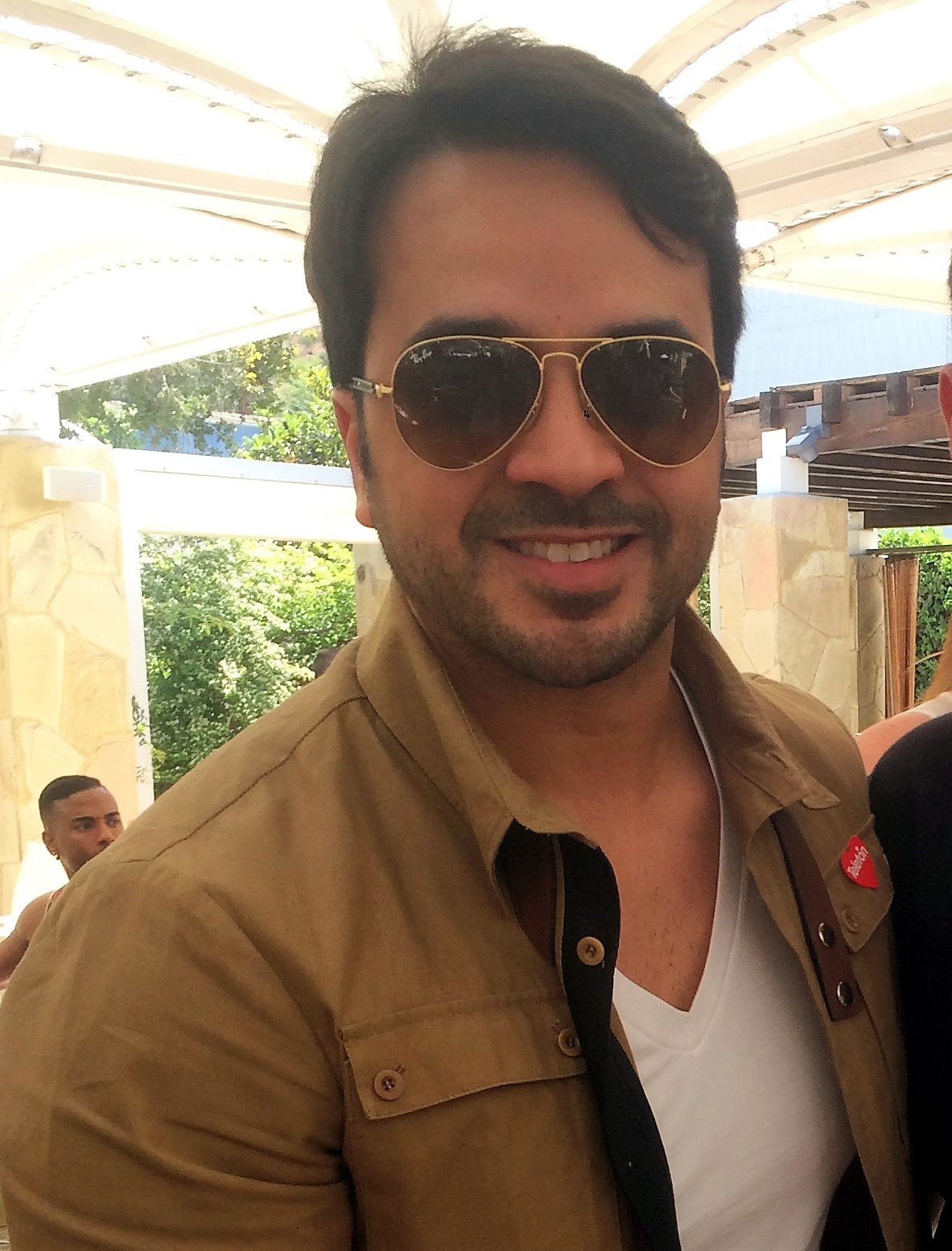
"Bailando" by Enrique Iglesias (left) and "Despacito" by Luis Fonsi (right) and Daddy Yankee brought a resurgence of Latin music's popularity to the mainstream audience.

At the beginning of the decade, sales of Latin music continued to plummeted, although digital sales began rising. This led to the Recording Industry Association of America (RIAA) to lower the threshold for their Latin certifications even further in December 2013. By the mid-2010s however, Latin music began generating revenue thanks to rise of music streaming services. By the late 2010s, Latin music had become mainstream again as it had done in the late 1990s thanks to songs such as "Despacito" by Luis Fonsi and Daddy Yankee and "Mi Gente" by J Balvin and Willy William. The trend in Latin music also led Latin artists collaborating or remixing their hits with other mainstream artists such as Justin Bieber, Beyoncé, Little Mix and Drake.

=== Latin pop ===
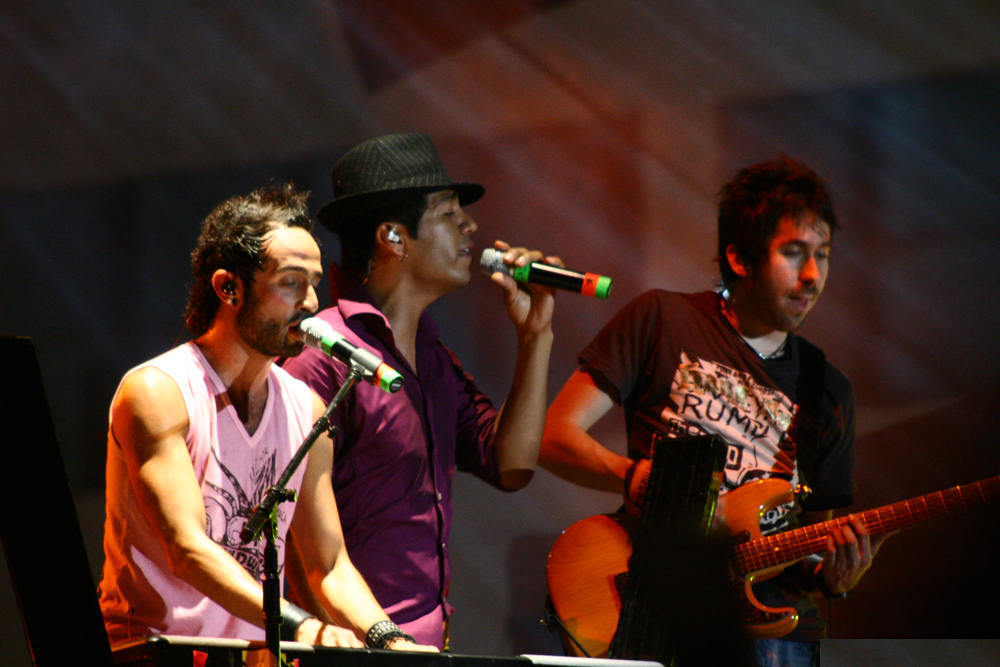
Camila continued the pop rock style music in Spanish during the early 2010s.

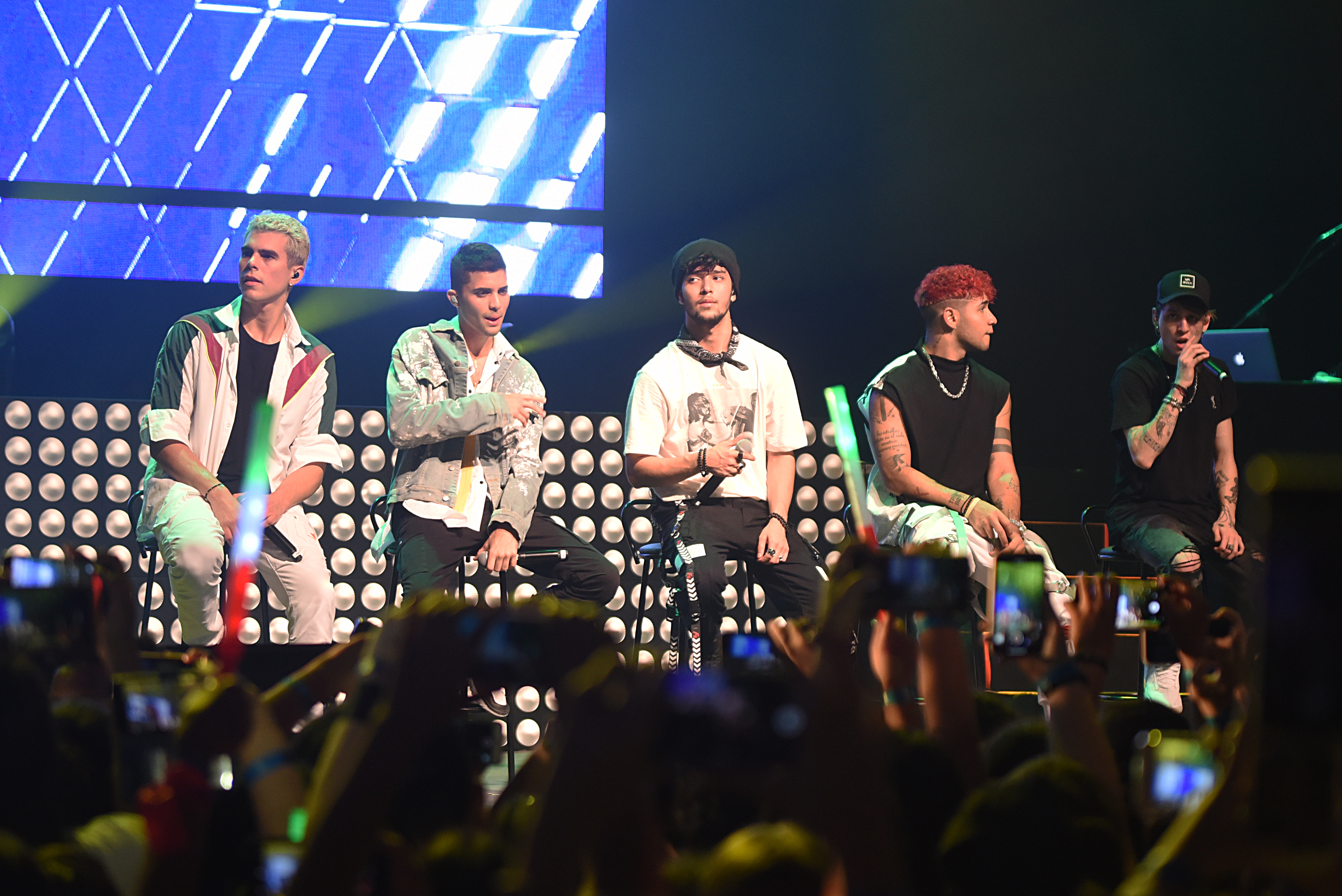
Latin boyband CNCO became one of the pioneers of the popetón movement in the late 2010s.

In the early 2010s, the Spanish-language pop rock continued to be popular in the Latin pop field with artists such as Camila, Río Roma, Jesse & Joy, and Reik being notable artists in the genre. Around the same time, albums of cover versions became popular as well with artists such as Marc Anthony, Cristian Castro, Kalimba, Jenni Rivera, and Sergio Dalma recording hits that are decades old. Colombian superstar Shakira released Sale el Sol in 2010 and sold over four million copies. By the mid-2010s however, pop ballads, which had been popular in the Latin pop field for decades began to slip in popularity. Up-tempo dance, reggaeton, and urbano tracks began taking pop ballad's place due to a change in demographics on radio stations. As a result of said changing demographics, Latin pop began embracing the sounds of reggaeton and has been dubbed "Popetón" with pop groups such as CNCO and Cali y El Dandee popularizing it.

=== Regional Mexican ===
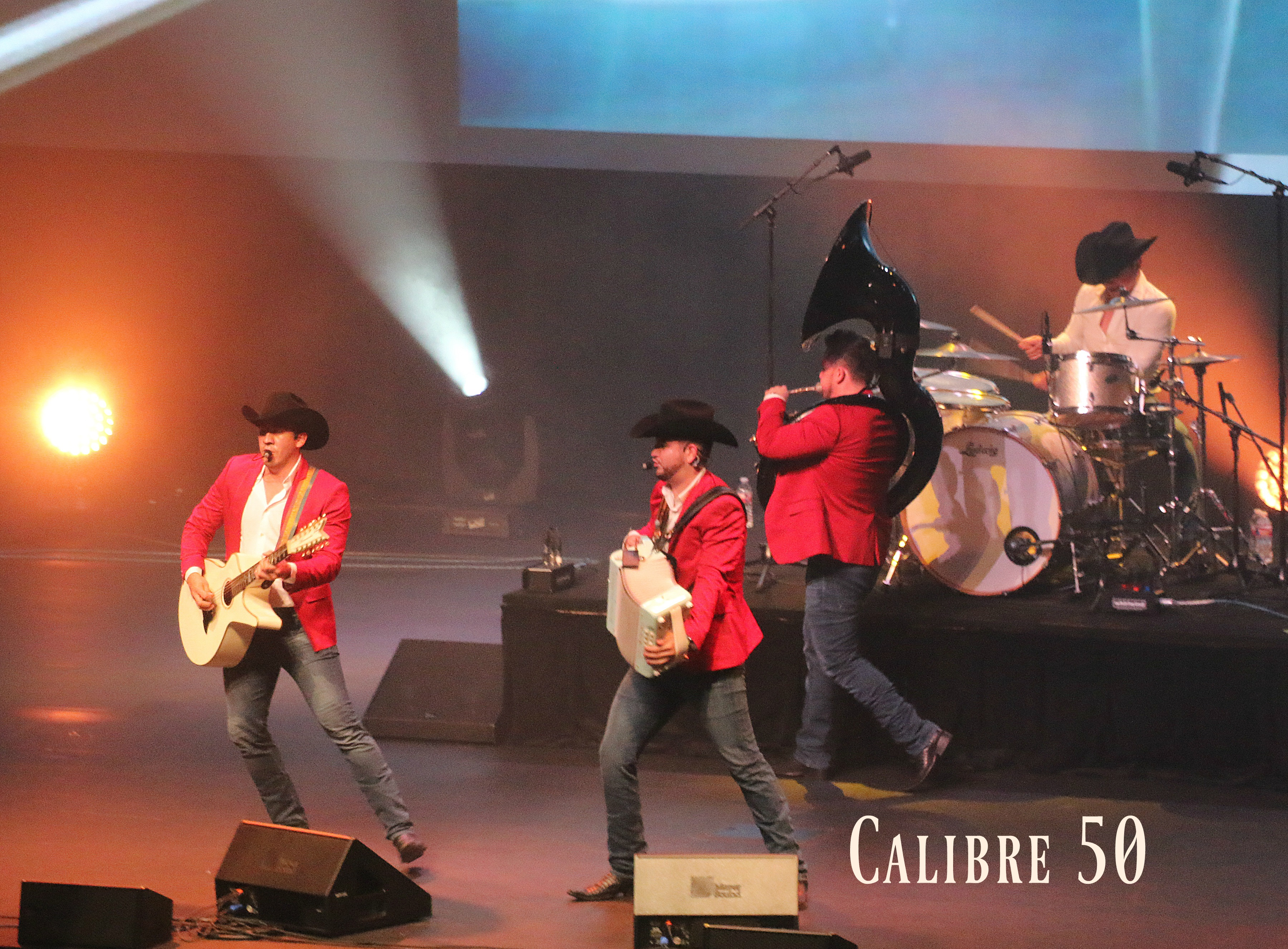
Calibre 50 mixed the sounds of norteño and banda and would become the artist with the most number-ones on the Billboard Regional Mexican Airplay chart.

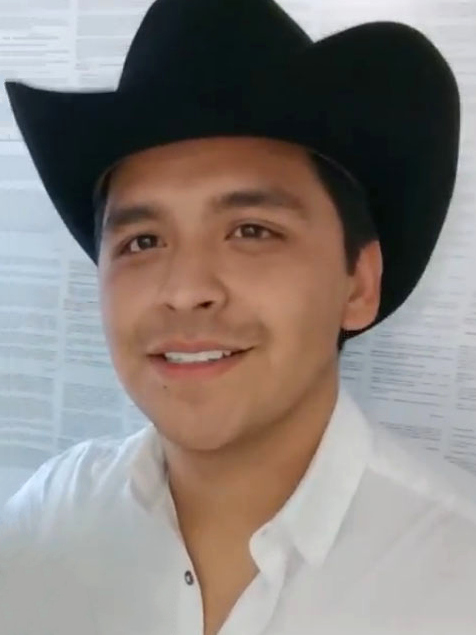
Christian Nodal became one of the faces of the Mexillenial movements in the late 2010s.

The banda genre continued its popularity through the decade and saw the death of Jenni Rivera in 2012. Calibre 50 fused the genres of banda and norteño and would later become the act with the most number ones on the Billboard Regional Mexican Airplay chart. 3BallMTY popularized the Tribal guarachero genre with their song "Inténtalo". By the end of the decade, younger musicians, dubbed "Mexillenial Artists" by Billboard began to rise with artists such as Christian Nodal, Luis R. Conriquez, and Luis Coronel.

=== Tropical ===
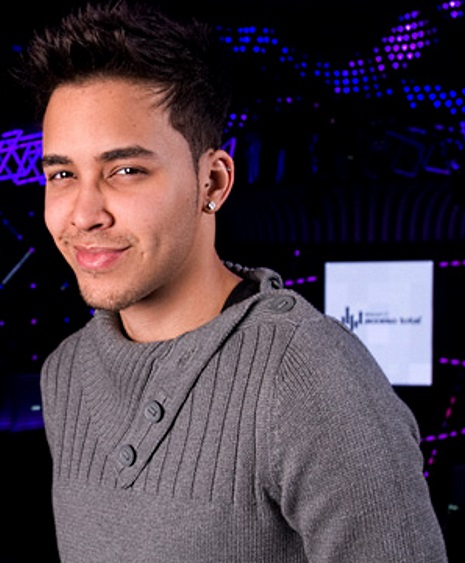
Prince Royce represented one of the newer generations of bachata music.

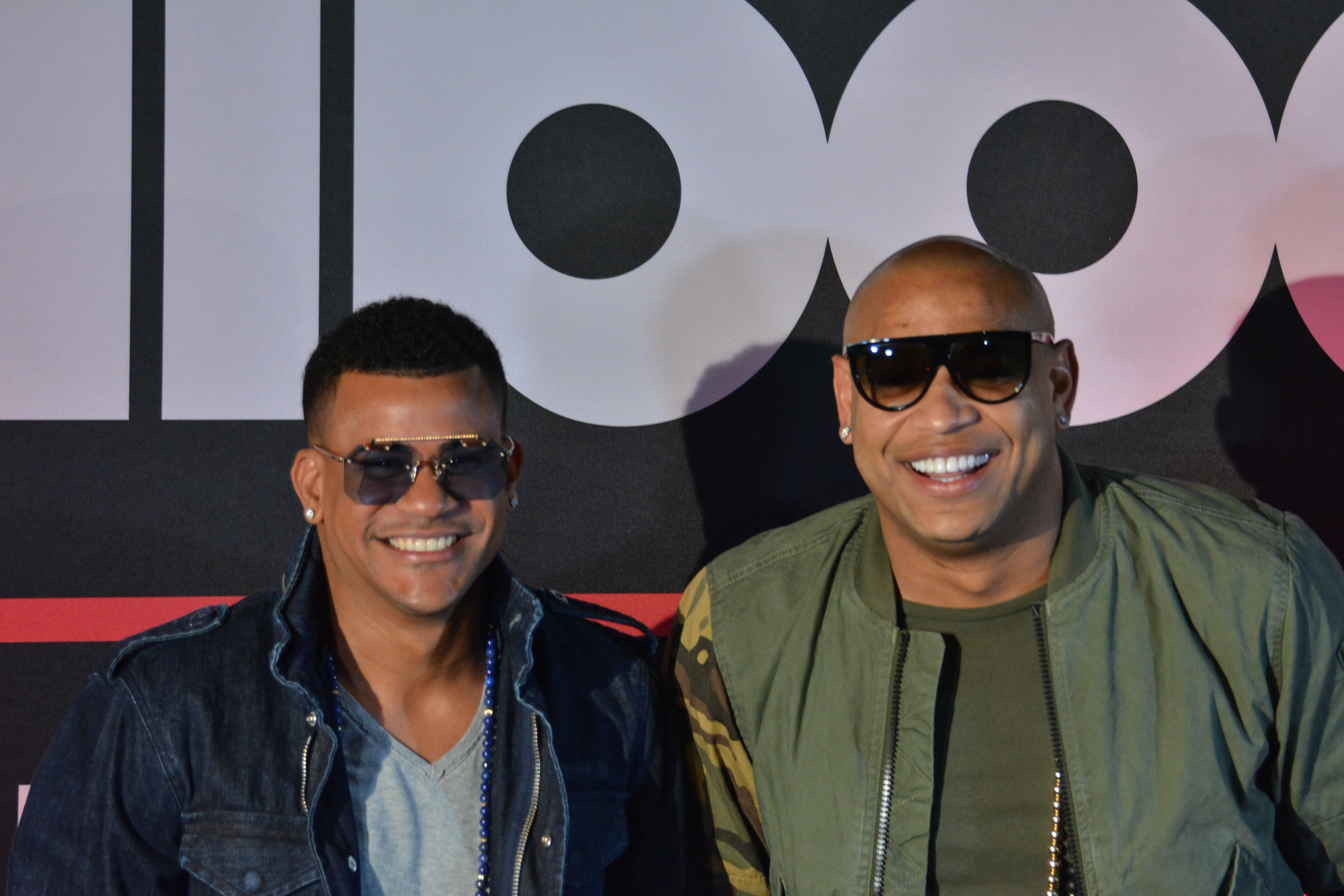
Gente de Zona became well-known for their tropical fusion.

For the first time since its popularity in the 1970s, salsa began to slide as bachata took over as the tropical field's most popular genre. However the salsa field still had veteran artists such Marc Anthony, Víctor Manuelle, Gilberto Santa Rosa, and La India. Anthony scored his biggest Spanish-language hit with "Vivir Mi Vida", which revived his career. In the bachata field, Romeo Santos, former lead singer of Aventura, launched his own career and became the most successful Latin artist of the decade. As he had done while with Aventura, he mixed bachata with contemporary genres such as R&B and collaborated with artists such Usher and Drake by having them perform bachata. The decade saw the debut of popular bachata artists such as Prince Royce, Leslie Grace, and Karlos Rosé. They began their careers by remaking decades old English-language songs such as "Stand by Me" and "Will You Love Me Tomorrow as a bachata tune. Merengue music saw a comeback with the newly style "merengue mambo" led by artists such as Omega and Fuego giving it an urban feel. Merengue was further popularized by Venezuelan artists such as Chino & Nacho, El Potro Álvarez, and Oscarcito. Cumbia remained popular throughout South America, namely in Argentina and Chile, with such artists such as Santa Feria and Ráfaga popularizing the cumbia villera movement. Another form of tropical music that emerged in the 2010s was tropical fusion, with groups such as Gente de Zona mixing tropical music with other urbano beats.

=== Urbano/reggaeton ===
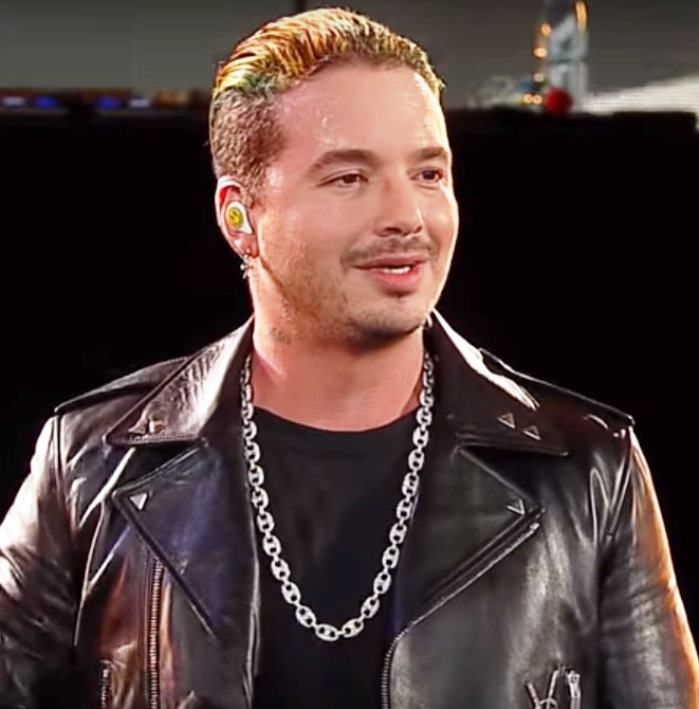
J Balvin emerged as one of reggaeton's most popular singers throughout the decade.

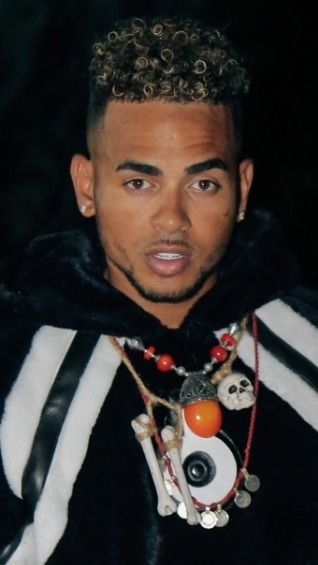
Ozuna became one of the pioneers of the Latin trap movement.

The most popular field in Latin music during the 2010s was the urbano movement, namely reggaeton and in the late 2010s Latin trap. Artists such as Daddy Yankee, Don Omar, and Wisin & Yandel, continued to remain relevant in the reggaeton field. Don Omar scored an international hit with "Danza Kuduro". In Colombia, J Balvin emerged as a local popular reggaeton artist and would later become an international act. Latin trap became popular in the urbano field with artists such as Ozuna, Bad Bunny, Sech, and De La Ghetto. "Te Boté" became one of the most well-known Latin trap songs.

=== Latin rock/alternative ===
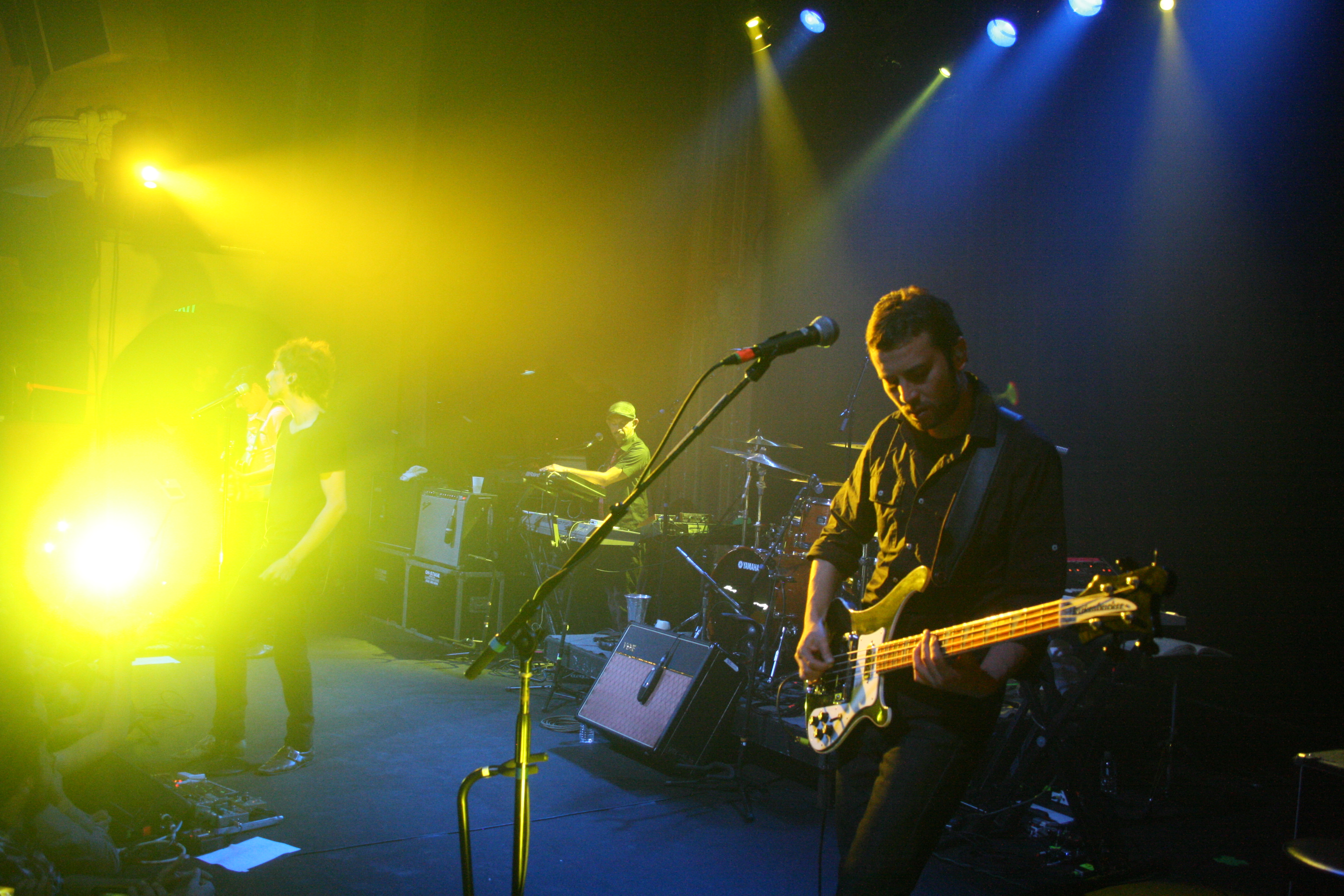
Mexican alternative rock band Zoé.

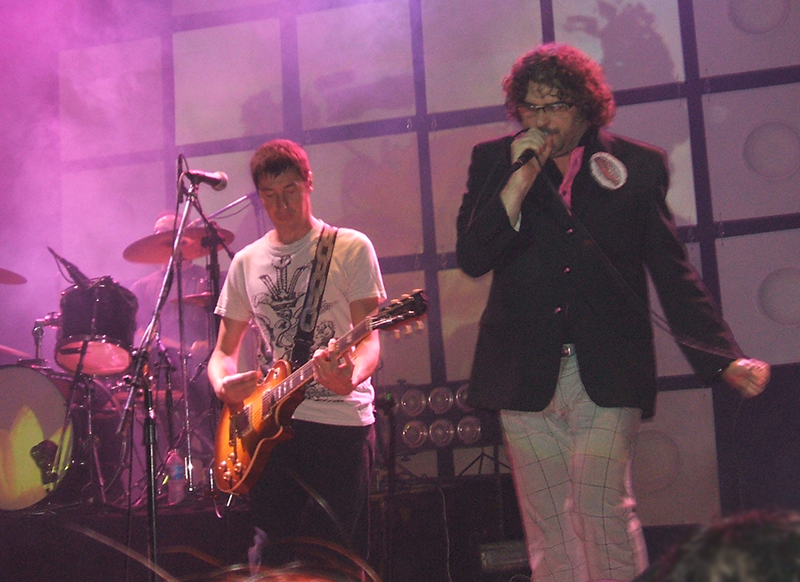
Uruguayan pop rock band El Cuarteto de Nos

=== Brazilian/Portuguese ===
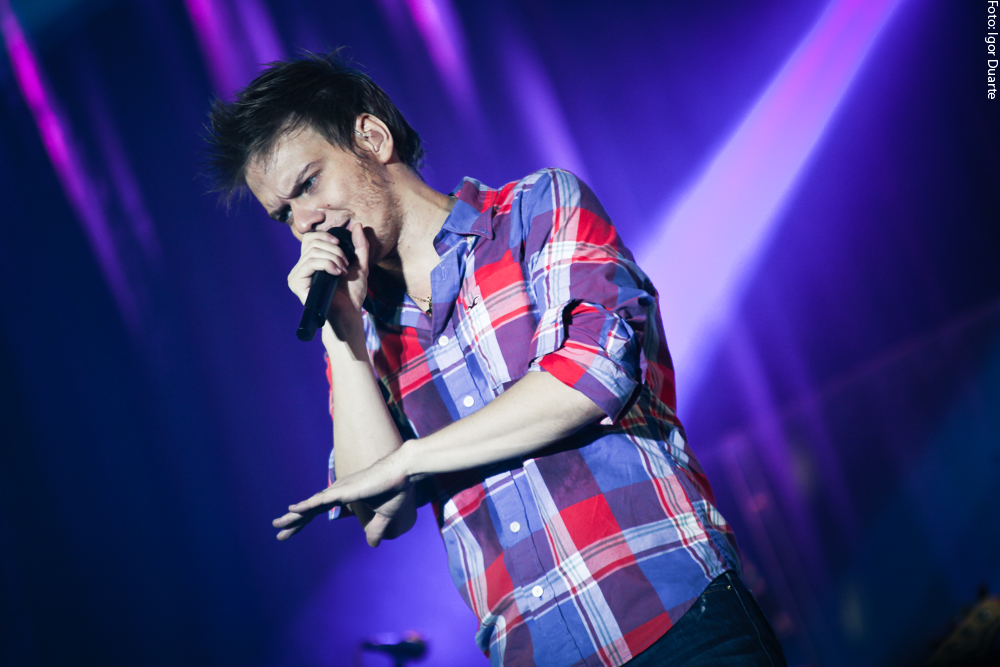
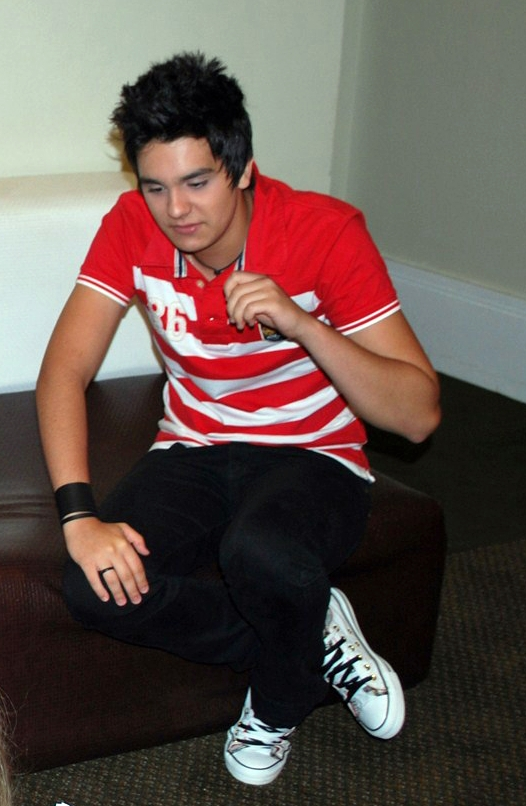
Michel Teló and Luan Santana popularized sertanejo music outside of its native Brazil.

Sertanejo music was popular, not only in Brazil, but also became well known outside of the county thanks to artist such as Michel Teló and Luan Santana. Teló scored an international hit with "Ai Se Eu Te Pego". In the late 2010s, Funk carioca also became popular in Brazil.

== Best-selling records ==
=== Best-performing albums ===
The following is a list of the top 10 best-performing Latin albums in the United States of the 2010s, according to Billboard.

Rank	Album	Artist
1	Formula, Vol. 2	Romeo Santos
2	3.0	Marc Anthony
3	Formula, Vol. 1	Romeo Santos
4	Prince Royce	Prince Royce
5	Dejarte de Amar	Camila
6	Odisea	Ozuna
7	Sex and Love	Enrique Iglesias
8	Los Dúo	Juan Gabriel
9	Euphoria	Enrique Iglesias
10	Mis Número 1...40 Aniversario	Juan Gabriel

=== Best-performing songs ===
The following is a list of the top 10 best-performing Latin songs in the United States of the 2010s, according to Billboard.

Rank	Single	Artist
1	"Despacito"	Luis Fonsi and Daddy Yankee featuring Justin Bieber
2	"Propuesta Indecente"	Romeo Santos
3	"El Perdón"	Nicky Jam and Enrique Iglesias
4	"Bailando"	Enrique Iglesias featuring Descemer Bueno and Gente de Zona
5	"Mia"	Bad Bunny featuring Drake
6	"Hasta el Amanecer"	Nicky Jam
7	"Ginza"	J Balvin
8	"Vivir Mi Vida"	Marc Anthony
9	"Mi Gente"	J Balvin and Willy William featuring Beyoncé
10	"Te Boté"	Casper Magico, Nio Garcia, Darell, Nicky Jam, Ozuna and Bad Bunny

== See also ==
- 2010s in music
