= Adicto (Prince Royce song) =

Single by Prince Royce featuring Marc Anthony

from the album Alter Ego
- Released: November 15, 2018
- Length: 3:29
- Label: Sony Latin
- Songwriters: Geoffrey Rojas; D’Lesly Lora; Marc Anthony; Oscar Hernández; Patrick Ingunza; Jorge Luis Chacín
- Producers: Prince Royce; D'Lesly "Dice" Lora; Prince Royce; Sergio George; (Salsa Version)

Prince Royce singles chronology
"Llegaste Tú" (2018)	"Adicto" (2018)	"Quiero Saber" (2018)

Marc Anthony singles chronology
"Está Rico" (2018)	"Adicto" (2018)	"Tu Vida en la Mía" (2018)

Music video
- "Addicto" on YouTube

"Adicto" (transl. "Addicted") is a song by American singers Prince Royce and Marc Anthony. The song was released on November 15, 2018 as the second single for Royce's sixth studio album, Alter Ego (2020). The music video premiered on the next day. A salsa version is included in the sixth album. However, it did not feature Marc Anthony even though he is one of the most famous artists of the salsa genre.

== Charts ==
=== Weekly charts ===
Chart (2018–19)	Peak position
Mexico Español Airplay (Billboard)	26
US Hot Latin Songs (Billboard)	33
US Latin Airplay (Billboard)	21
US Latin Pop Airplay (Billboard)	11
US Tropical Airplay (Billboard)	1

=== Year-end charts ===
Chart (2019)	Peak position
US Tropical Airplay (Billboard)	9

== Certifications ==
Region	Certification	Certified units/sales
Spain (Promusicae)	Gold	50,000^{‡}
United States (RIAA)	5× Platinum (Latin)	300,000^{‡}
^{‡} Sales+streaming figures based on certification alone.

== See also ==
- List of Billboard Tropical Airplay number ones of 2018
