= List of Billboard Tropical Airplay number ones of 2020 =

The Billboard Tropical Airplay chart is a subchart of the Latin Airplay that ranks the best-performing tropical songs played on Latin radio stations in the United States.

== Chart history ==
Issue date	Song	Artist	Ref
January 4	"Lo Que Te Di"	Marc Anthony	
January 11	"Lo Que Te Di"	Marc Anthony	
January 18	"La Mejor Version de Mi"	Natti Natasha & Romeo Santos	
January 25	"Lo Que Te Di"	Marc Anthony	
February 1	"Lo Que Te Di"	Marc Anthony	
February 8	"Morir Solo"	Prince Royce	
February 15	"La Mejor Version de Mi"	Natti Natasha & Romeo Santos	
February 22	"La Mejor Version de Mi"	Natti Natasha & Romeo Santos	
February 29	"La Mejor Version de Mi"	Natti Natasha & Romeo Santos	
March 7	"La Mejor Version de Mi"	Natti Natasha & Romeo Santos	
March 14	"La Mejor Version de Mi"	Natti Natasha & Romeo Santos	
March 21	"La Mejor Version de Mi"	Natti Natasha & Romeo Santos	
March 28	"Carita de Inocente"	Prince Royce	
April 4	"Carita de Inocente"	Prince Royce	
April 11	"Carita de Inocente"	Prince Royce	
April 18	"Carita de Inocente"	Prince Royce	
April 25	"Carita de Inocente"	Prince Royce	
May 2	"Carita de Inocente"	Prince Royce	
May 9	"Carita de Inocente"	Prince Royce	
May 16	"Carita de Inocente"	Prince Royce	
May 23	"Carita de Inocente"	Prince Royce	
May 30	"Carita de Inocente"	Prince Royce	
June 6	"Carita de Inocente"	Prince Royce	
June 13	"Carita de Inocente"	Prince Royce	
June 20	"Carita de Inocente"	Prince Royce	
June 27	"Carita de Inocente"	Prince Royce	
July 4	"Carita de Inocente"	Prince Royce	
July 11	"Carita de Inocente"	Prince Royce	
July 18	"Carita de Inocente"	Prince Royce	
July 25	"Carita de Inocente"	Prince Royce	
August 1	"Carita de Inocente"	Prince Royce	
August 8	"Carita de Inocente"	Prince Royce	
August 15	"Carita de Inocente"	Prince Royce	
August 22	"Carita de Inocente"	Prince Royce	
August 29	"Carita de Inocente"	Prince Royce	
September 5	"Carita de Inocente"	Prince Royce	
September 12	"El Carnaval de Celia: A Tribute (La Vida Es Un Carnaval / La Negra Tiene"	KYEN?ES?	
September 19	"Carita de Inocente"	Prince Royce	
September 26	"Carita de Inocente"	Prince Royce	
October 3	"Carita de Inocente"	Prince Royce	
October 10	"Carita de Inocente"	Prince Royce	
October 17	"Carita de Inocente"	Prince Royce	
October 24	"Loteria"	Prince Royce	
October 31	"Loteria"	Prince Royce	
November 7	"Loteria"	Prince Royce	
November 14	"Loteria"	Prince Royce	
November 21	"Loteria"	Prince Royce	
November 28	"Loteria"	Prince Royce	
December 5	"Loteria"	Prince Royce	
December 12	"Loteria"	Prince Royce	
December 19	"Loteria"	Prince Royce	
December 26	"Loteria"	Prince Royce	
