= Alter Ego (Prince Royce album) =

Studio album by Prince Royce
- Released: February 7, 2020
- Genre: bachata; latin pop; tropical; latin urban; R&B
- Language: Spanish
- Label: Sony Latin
- Producer: Prince Royce; D'Lesly Lora; Lincoln Castañeda; Dr. Anonymous; Sergio George

Prince Royce chronology
Spotify Singles (2017)	Alter Ego (2020)	Llamada Perdida (2024)

Prince Royce studio album chronology
Five (2017)	Alter Ego (2020)	Llamada Perdida (2024)

Singles from Alter Ego
- 1. "El Clavo" Released: March 16, 2018; 2. "El Clavo (Remix)" Released: May 11, 2018; 3. "Adicto" Released: November 15, 2018; 4. "Cúrame" Released: June 7, 2019; 5. "Morir Solo" Released: August 30, 2019; 6. "Trampa" Released: November 15, 2019; 7. "Dec. 21" Released: December 21, 2019; 8. "Cita" Released: January 24, 2020; 9. "Carita de Inocente" Released: February 21, 2020; 10. "Luna Negra" Released: April 11, 2020; 11. "Contra La Pared" Released: May 23, 2020; 12. "Si Supieras" Released: October 30, 2020

Alter Ego (stylized as ALTER EGO) is the sixth studio album by American singer and songwriter Prince Royce. It was released on February 7, 2020 by Sony Music Latin, preceded by the release of seven singles which include "El Clavo", "Adicto", "Cúrame", "Morir Solo", "Trampa", "Dec. 21" and "Cita". The album includes collaborations with artists such as DaniLeigh, Marc Anthony, Wisin & Yandel, Zion & Lennox, Manuel Turizo and Maluma.

== Commercial performance ==
The album debuted at number 1 on the Top Latin Albums Chart, and sold 11,000 album-equivalent units, during its first week of release in the United States.

== Track listing ==
The physical CD version is a double album. Meaning that it contained 2 disc.

Alter Ego – Genesis
No.	Title	Writer(s)	Producer(s)	Length
1.	"Carita de Inocente"	Geoffrey Royce, D’Lesly Lora, Yonathan Then	Geoffrey Rojas, D’Lesly Lora	3:11
2.	"Si Supieras"	Rojas, Lora, Then, Ronald López	Rojas, Lora	3:58
3.	"Señorita Por Favor"	Rojas, Lora, López, Shanelli Rojas, Salim Asencio	Rojas, Lora	3:42
4.	"Dec. 21"	Rojas, Lora, Then, López, Edward David	Lora	3:32
5.	"Es Muy Tarde"	Rojas, Lora, Rojas, Lincoln Castañeda	Rojas, Lora, Lincoln Castañeda	3:35
6.	"Lotería"	Rojas, Lora, Then, López	Rojas, Lora	3:36
7.	"Me Robaste La Vida"	Rojas, Lora, Then, Pamel Mancebo Martínez	Rojas, Lora	3:28
8.	"Contra La Pared"	Rojas, Lora, Daniel Santacruz	Rojas, Lora	3:53
9.	"Morir Solo"	Rojas, Lora, Then	Lora	4:02
10.	"Pull Up" (feat DaniLeigh)	Rojas, Randy Class, Jean Rodríguez, Dr. Anonymous, Brandon Curiel, Andrew Oliver, DaniLeigh	Rojas, Dr. Anonymous	3:32
11.	"Adicto" (feat Marc Anthony)	Rojas, Lora, Marc Anthony, Oscar Hernández, Patrick Ingunza, Jorge Luis Chacín	Lora	3:30
12.	"Adicto (Salsa Version)"	Rojas, Lora, Anthony, Hernández, Ingunza, Chacín	Rojas, Sergio George	3:51

Alter Ego – Enigma
No.	Title	Writer(s)	Producer(s)	Length
1.	"Cita"	Rojas, Andy Clay, Yei Gonzalez, Timbaland, Stephen Garret, Raico Silva, Jessee Suárez, Ernesto Álvarez, Ginuwine,	Rojas, Andy Clay, Yei Gonzalez	3:36
2.	"Besos Mojados"	Rojas, Clay, Kevin ADG, Chan El Genio, Ily Wonder	Rojas, Ily Wonder, The Rudeboyz	3:05
3.	"Una Aventura" (feat Wisin & Yandel)	Rojas, Weezy Kingz, Xavier Semper, DJ Luian, Henry Pulman, Elvin Peña, Wisin & Yandel	Mambo Kingz, DJ Luian	3:51
4.	"Yo Te Soñé"	Rojas, Ricardo Jiménez, Jaime Ortiz, David Alvarez	Rojas, KingSwifft	3:47
5.	"Luna Negra"	Rojas, Lora, Then, Asencio	Rojas, Lora	2:56
6.	"Fill Me In"	Mark Hill, Craig David	Rojas, Maejor	3:23
7.	"Trampa" (feat Zion & Lennox)	Rojas, Lora, Gabriel Pizarro, Félix Ortiz, Reggi “El Auténtico”, Rene Da Silva	Lora, Reggi “El Auténtico”, Rene Da Silva & D’Lesly “Dice” Lora	3:29
8.	"Really Real"	Rojas, J. Rodríguez, Vinylz	Rojas, Vinylz	3:07
9.	"Cúrame" (feat Manuel Turizo)	Rojas, Hydro, Weezy Kingz, Juan Medina Vélez, Xavier Semper, DJ Luian, Manuel Turizo, Jowny Boom Boom, Julian Turizo, Henry Pulman, Francis Diaz, Elvin Peña	Mambo Kingz, DJ Luian	3:22
10.	"El Clavo"	Rojas, Shanelli Rojas, Luigi Castillo, Edgar Barrera, Camilo, Alejandro Montaner	Edgar Barrera	2:53
11.	"El Clavo (Remix)" (feat Maluma)	Rojas, Rojas, Castillo, Barrera, Camilo, Montaner	Edgar Barrera	2:52

== Charts ==
=== Weekly charts ===
Chart performance for Alter Ego
Chart (2020)	Peak position
US Billboard 200	67
US Top Latin Albums (Billboard)	1
US Tropical Albums (Billboard)	1

=== Year-end charts ===
Year-end chart performance for Alter Ego
Chart (2020)	Position
US Top Latin Albums (Billboard)	56

== Certifications ==
Certifications for Alter Ego
Region	Certification	Certified units/sales
Mexico (AMPROFON)	Gold	30,000^{‡}
United States (RIAA)	6× Platinum (Latin)	360,000^{‡}
^{‡} Sales+streaming figures based on certification alone.

== See also ==
- 2020 in Latin music
- List of number-one Billboard Latin Albums from the 2020s
