= El Clavo (song) =

Single by Prince Royce Remix featuring Maluma

from the album Alter Ego
- Released: March 18, 2018; May 11, 2018 (Remix)
- Length: 2:52
- Label: Sony Latin
- Songwriters: Geoffrey Rojas; Shanelli Rojas; Luigi Castillo; Edgar Barrera; Camilo; Alejandro Montaner
- Producer: Edgar Barrera

Prince Royce singles chronology
"No Love" (2018)	"El Clavo" (2018)	"90 Minutos (Fútbol Mode)" (2018)

Maluma singles chronology
"El Préstamo" (2018)	"El Clavo (Remix)" (2018)	"Colors" (2018)

Music video
- "El Clavo" on YouTube "El Clavo (Remix)" on YouTube

"El Clavo" (transl. "The Nail") is a song by Dominican-American singer Prince Royce. The audio and music video were both released on March 18, 2018. On May 11, 2018, the remix was released which featured Colombian artist Maluma. The music video was released on August 28, 2018.

== Charts ==
=== Weekly charts ===
Chart (2018)	Peak position
Argentina Hot 100 (Billboard)	26
Mexico Airplay (Billboard)	49
Mexico Español Airplay (Billboard)	15
US Hot Latin Songs (Billboard)	13
US Latin Airplay (Billboard)	1
US Latin Pop Airplay (Billboard)	2
US Latin Rhythm Airplay (Billboard)	1

=== Year-end charts ===
Chart (2018)	position
US Latin Airplay (Billboard)	19

== Certifications ==
Region	Certification	Certified units/sales
Mexico (AMPROFON)	Diamond+Platinum+Gold	390,000^{‡}
Spain (Promusicae)	Gold	20,000^{‡}
United States (RIAA)	12× Platinum (Latin)	720,000^{‡}
^{‡} Sales+streaming figures based on certification alone.

== See also ==
- List of Billboard number-one Latin songs of 2018
