= Morir Solo =

Single by Prince Royce

from the album Alter Ego
- Language: Spanish
- English title: To Die Alone
- Released: August 30, 2019
- Genre: Bachata
- Length: 4:02
- Label: Sony Latin
- Songwriters: Geoffrey Rojas; D’Lesly Lora; Yonathan Then
- Producer: D’Lesly Lora

Prince Royce singles chronology
"Cúrame" (2019)	"Morir Solo" (2019)	"Trampa" (2019)

Music video
- "Morir Solo" on YouTube

"Morir Solo" (transl. "To Die Alone") is a song by Dominican-American singer Prince Royce. The song was released on August 30, 2019, as the fourth single for Royce's sixth studio album, Alter Ego (2020). The music video premiered on the same day.

== Charts ==
=== Weekly charts ===
Chart (2019–20)	Peak position
US Hot Latin Songs (Billboard)	35
US Latin Airplay (Billboard)	21
US Latin Pop Airplay (Billboard)	15
US Tropical Airplay (Billboard)	1

=== Year-end charts ===
Chart (2019)	position
US Tropical Airplay (Billboard)	18
Chart (2020)	position
US Tropical Airplay (Billboard)	9

== Certifications ==
Region	Certification	Certified units/sales
United States (RIAA)	3× Platinum (Latin)	180,000^{‡}
^{‡} Sales+streaming figures based on certification alone.

== See also ==
- List of Billboard Tropical Airplay number ones of 2019
