= Está Rico =

Single by Marc Anthony, Will Smith and Bad Bunny
- Language: Spanish; English
- English title: "It's Good"
- Released: September 28, 2018
- Length: 3:35
- Label: Sony Latin
- Songwriters: Marco Muñiz; Willard Smith; Benito Martínez; Edgar Semper-Vargas; Xavier Semper-Vargas; Tremaine Winfrey; Nicholaus Williams; Andy Clay; Luian Malave; Noah Assad; Oscar Hernández; Brandon Green; Jesús Herrera; Daniel Valencia; Daniel Mizrahi; Daniel Stephenson
- Producers: Oscarcito; Daleplay; Daneon

Marc Anthony singles chronology
| "Almost Like Praying" (2017) | "Está Rico" (2018) | "Adicto" (2018) |

Will Smith singles chronology
| "Live It Up" (2018) | "Está Rico" (2018) | "Will (Remix)" (2020) |

Bad Bunny singles chronology
| "Como Soy" (2018) | "Está Rico" (2018) | "Mia" (2018) |

Music video
- "Está Rico" on YouTube

"Está Rico" (transl. "It's Good") is a song by American singer Marc Anthony, American actor and rapper Will Smith, and Puerto Rican rapper Bad Bunny. The single was released by Sony Music Latin on September 28, 2018.

== Background ==
Speaking about the single, in an interview, Marc Anthony said: "[Will] and I have always wanted to work on a musical collaboration, this song seems perfect for this moment we're both experiencing creatively". About working with Bad Bunny, Anthony also said: "Working with Bad Bunny for the first time has been a great surprise. We all had a magnificent chemistry, and that energy is palpable in both the music and the video".

== Music video ==
The music video for the song features the aforementioned performers, as well as Puerto Rican model Joan Smalls and actor Luis Guzmán. It was directed by Carlos Pérez.

== Charts ==
=== Weekly charts ===
| Chart (2018) | Peak position |
|---|---|
| Bolivia (Monitor Latino) | 11 |
| Chile (Monitor Latino) | 7 |
| Puerto Rico (Monitor Latino) | 17 |
| Spain (PROMUSICAE) | 14 |
| US Bubbling Under Hot 100 (Billboard) | 4 |
| US Hot Latin Songs (Billboard) | 5 |
| US Latin Airplay (Billboard) | 27 |
| US Latin Rhythm Airplay (Billboard) | 18 |
| Venezuela (Monitor Latino) | 14 |

=== Year-end charts ===
| Chart (2018) | Position |
|---|---|
| Dominican Republic Streaming (Monitor Latino) | 93 |
| US Hot Latin Songs (Billboard) | 94 |
| Chart (2019) | Position |
| US Hot Latin Songs (Billboard) | 78 |

== Certifications ==
| Region | Certification | Certified units/sales |
|---|---|---|
| Mexico (AMPROFON) | 2× Platinum | 120,000^{‡} |
| Spain (Promusicae) | 2× Platinum | 120,000^{‡} |
^{‡} Sales+streaming figures based on certification alone.
