= 2000s in Latin music =

Major events and trends in Latin music in the 2000s

- 1990s ^{.} 2000s in Latin music ^{.} 2010s

For Latin music from a year in the 2000s, go to 00 | 01 | 02 | 03 | 04 | 05 | 06 | 07 | 08 | 09

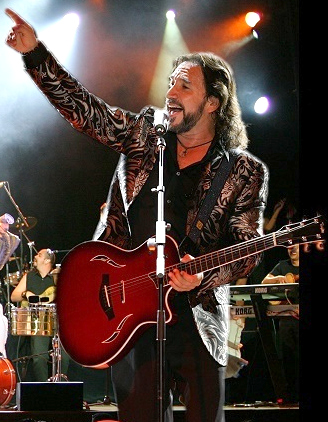
Marco Antonio Solís was named Top Latin Artist of the 2000s by Billboard.

This article includes an overview of the major events and trends in Latin music in the 2000s, namely in Ibero-America (including Spain and Portugal). This includes the rise and fall of various subgenres in Latin music from 2000 to 2009.

== Overview ==
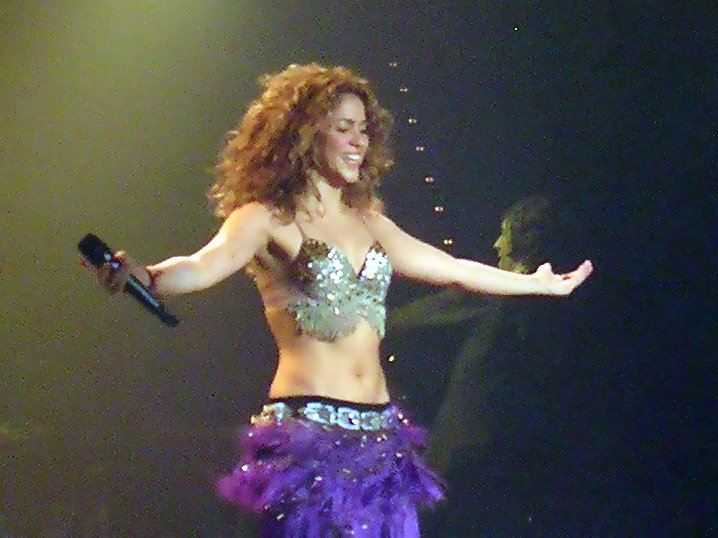
Shakira had the longest-running number one of the decade on the Hot Latin Songs chart with "La Tortura".

By 2005, sales of Latin albums rose to 14% according to the RIAA. By 2008 however, due to declining sales of albums worldwide, sales of Latin albums dropped to 21.1% also according to the RIAA. Due to the declining sales, the RIAA lowered the threshold for Latin certifications in 2008. One trend that emerged since the late 1990s was Latin artists recording multiple renditions of their hit song for different Latin formats. For example, Luis Fonsi's song "Nada Es Para Siempre", an acoustic pop rock track, reached number one on the Billboard Tropical Airplay chart thanks to its salsa version and a reggeaton remix featuring Adassa.

=== Latin pop ===
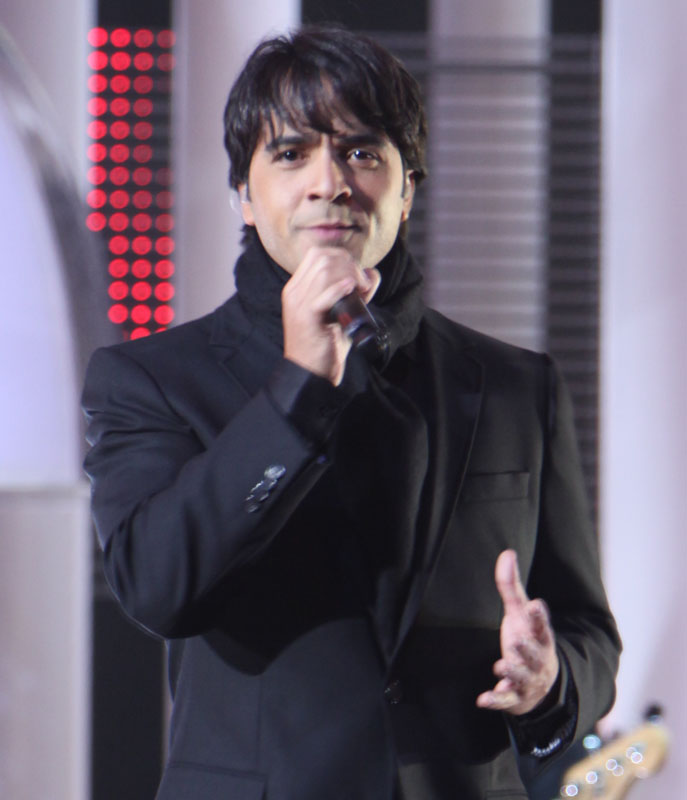
Luis Fonsi, who emerged as a ballad singer in late 1990s, had the best-performing Latin pop song of the decade with "No me doy por vencido".

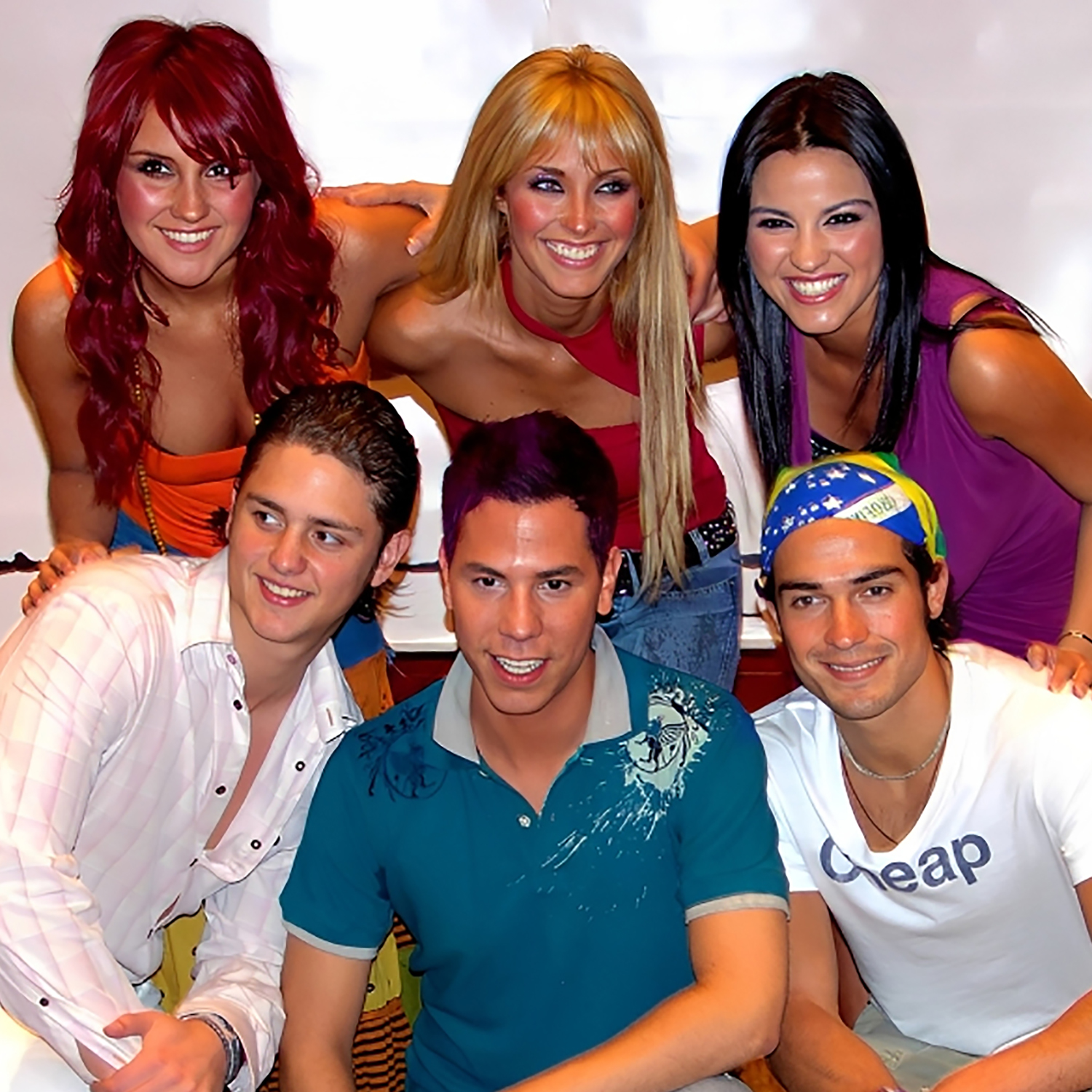
RBD, according to Nylon.com, "became the epicenter of Latin pop in the 2000s".

In spite of the "Latin pop explosion" that occurred in the late 1990s, the genre swiftly returned to its string-laden pop ballad style in the early 2000s. The genre at this time was met unfavorably viewed by music critics as bland and formulaic due to relying on the same arrangements on the ballads. It should be noted however that Spanish-language Europop and other dance songs remained on dance clubs. "Y Yo Sigo Aquí" by Paulina Rubio, which incorporated elements of Europop and reached number in several Latin American countries. Other novelty Spanish-language pop songs of the early 2000s include "La Bomba" by Azul Azul and "The Ketchup Song (Aserejé)" by Las Ketchup.

By the mid-2000s, Latin pop evolved into a more pop rock style while still being performed as ballads. Notable Latin pop groups in the 2000s include Camila, Sin Bandera, RBD, and Reik, all from Mexico. Luis Fonsi, who began performing string-laden ballads earlier in his career also adapted into a pop rock style and has the longest-running number one song on the Latin Pop Airplay chart with "No me doy por vencido". RBD, according to Nylon.com, "became the epicenter of Latin pop in the 2000s".

=== Regional Mexican ===
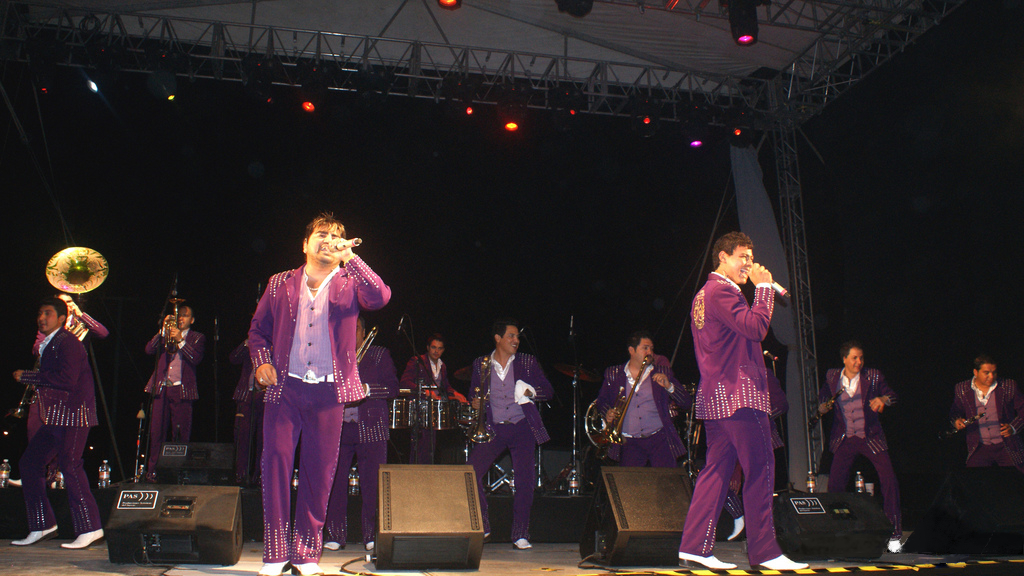
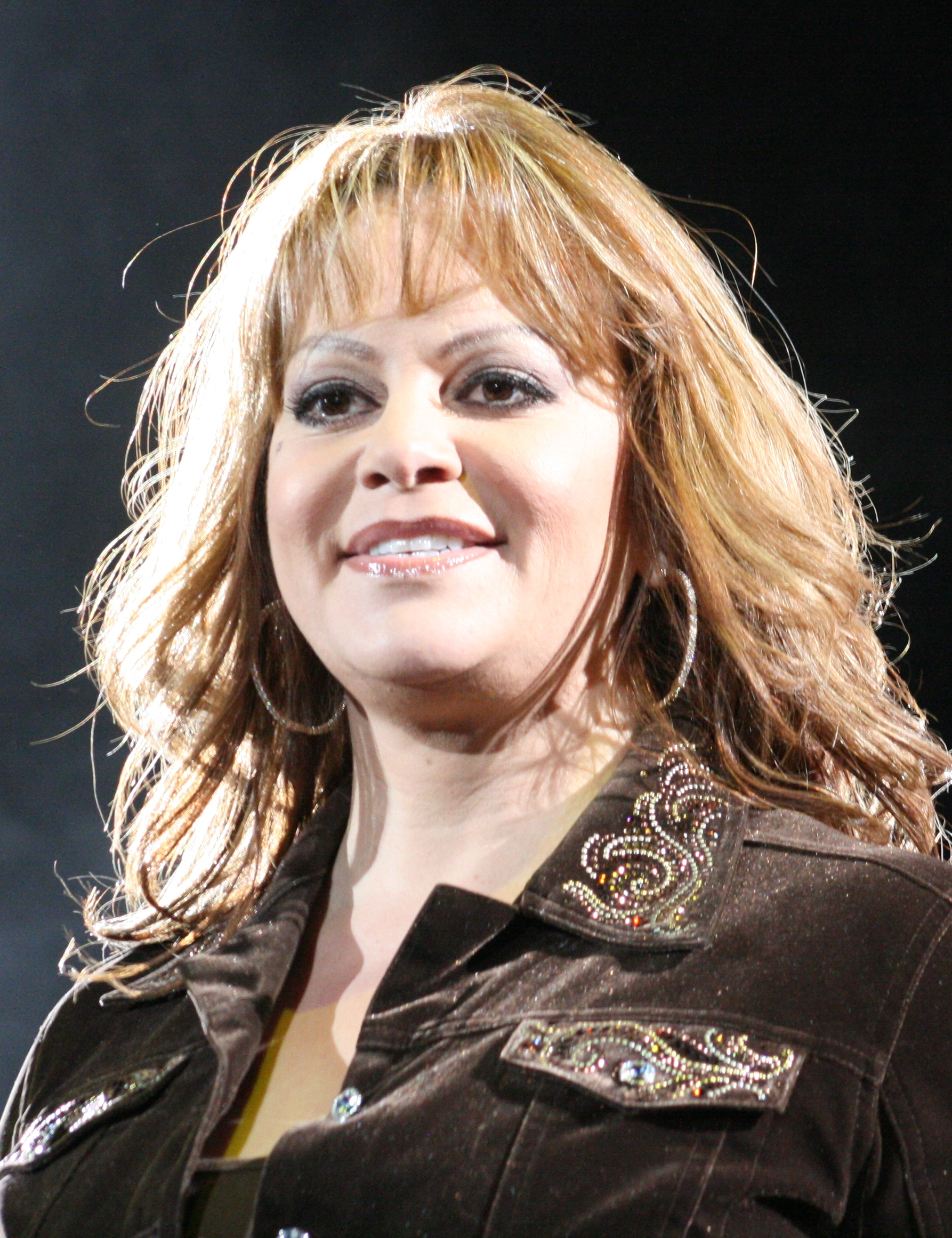
Banda retained its popularity during the 2000s with veteran acts such as Banda el Recodo (left) maintaining its appeal, while Jenni Rivera (right) became a prominent figure in an otherwise male dominated field.

Banda music resurged thanks to veteran acts such as Banda el Recodo. Jenni Rivera became a prominent figure in an otherwise male dominated genre. A subgenre of Regional Mexican, duranguense, became also popular in the 2000s. Recognized norteño acts during the decade include Conjunto Primavera and Intocable. Continuing from the 1990s are Mexican cumbia bands such as Los Ángeles Azules with their songs like "El Listón de Tu Pelo" and Los Ángeles de Charly with "Me Volví a Acordar de Ti".

=== Tropical ===
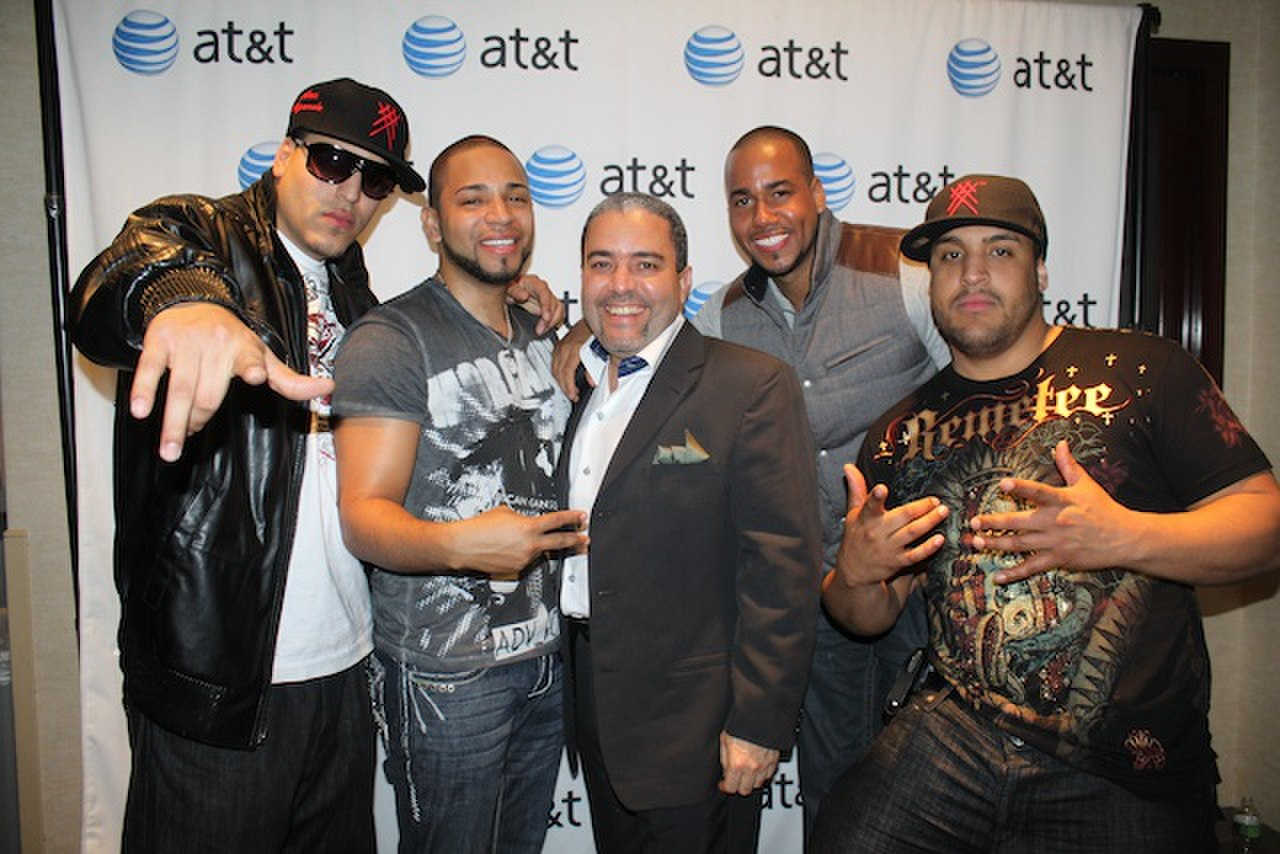
American bachata group Aventura's fusion of bachata with urban genres such as R&B helped expand the genre's popularity with a younger audience.

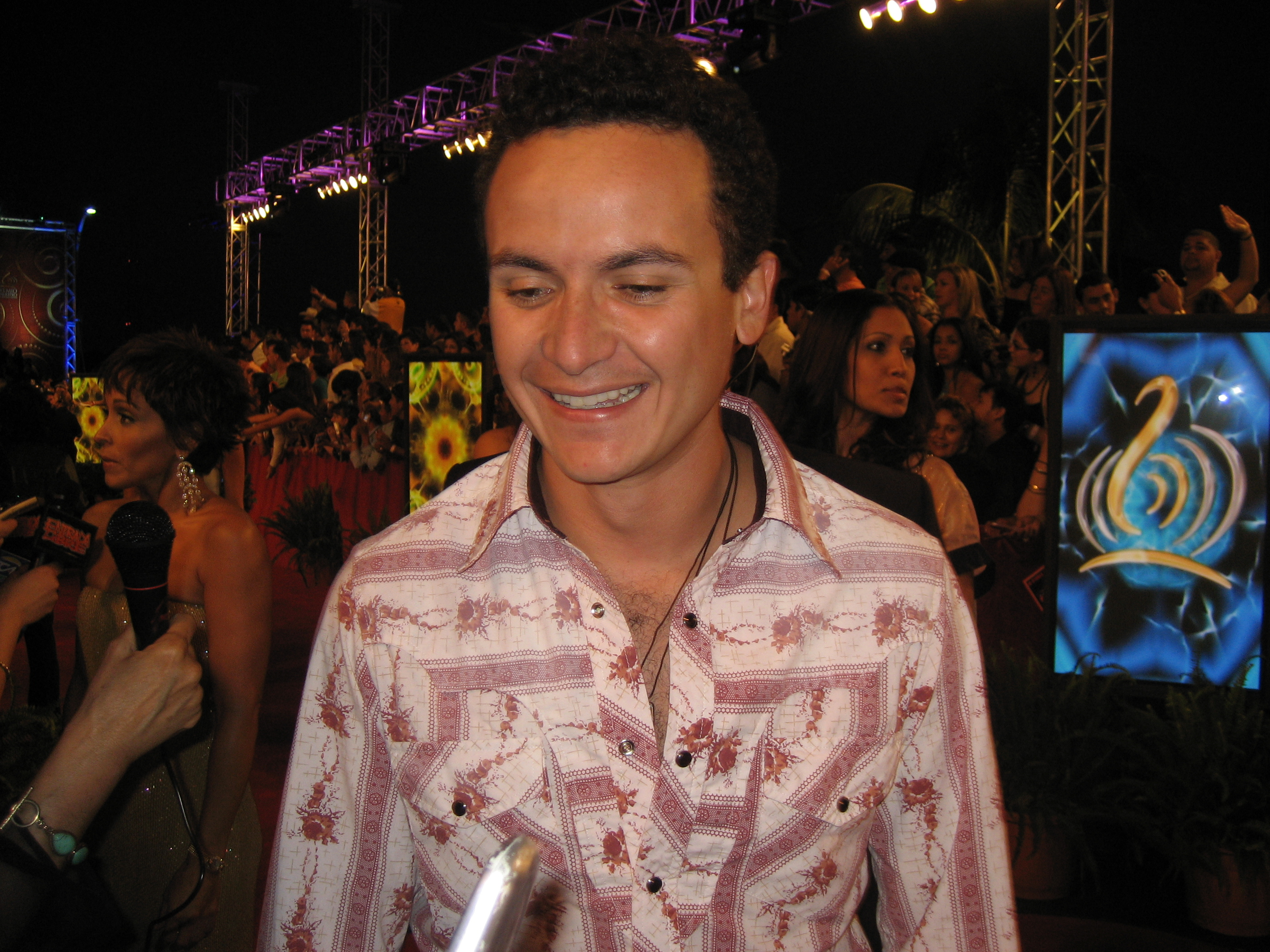
Tropipop became popular in Colombia with one of its singers Fonseca having spent 22 weeks at number one in the country with "Te Mando Flores".

Salsa and Merengue continued to rival each other in the early 2000s. Salsa veterans such as Marc Anthony, Víctor Manuelle, La India, Gilberto Santa Rosa, and Jerry Rivera, all of whom were popular in the 1990s, had continued success in the 2000s. The 2000s also the death of Celia Cruz, who was known as the "Queen of Salsa". Merengue, however, began to slide in its popularity as bachata (both originating from the Dominican Republic) continued its ascent from the 1990s. Most notably, American bachata group Aventura, experimented bachata with other urban genres such as R&B and hip hip which led to a widespread appeal to a younger audience. Monchy & Alexandra and Xtreme also pushed bachata's popularity. In Colombia, a fusion of Colombian pop and tropical music became known as tropipop and gain a major following both in and outside the country. Fonseca's "Te Mando Flores" spent 22 weeks at number one in Colombia.

=== Urbano/reggaeton ===
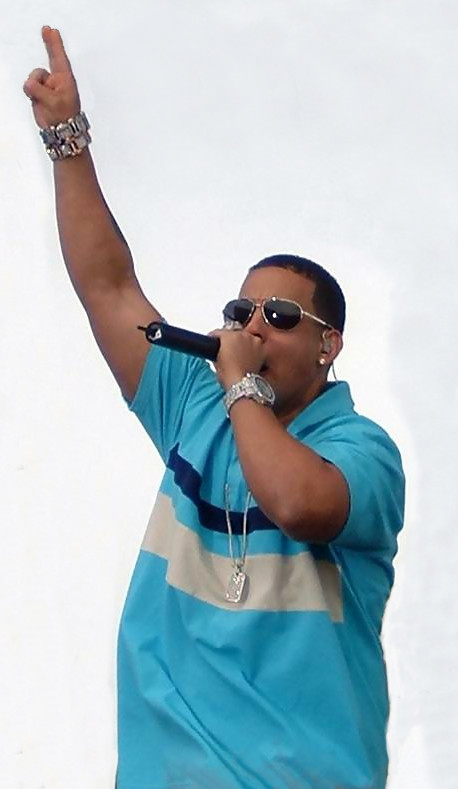
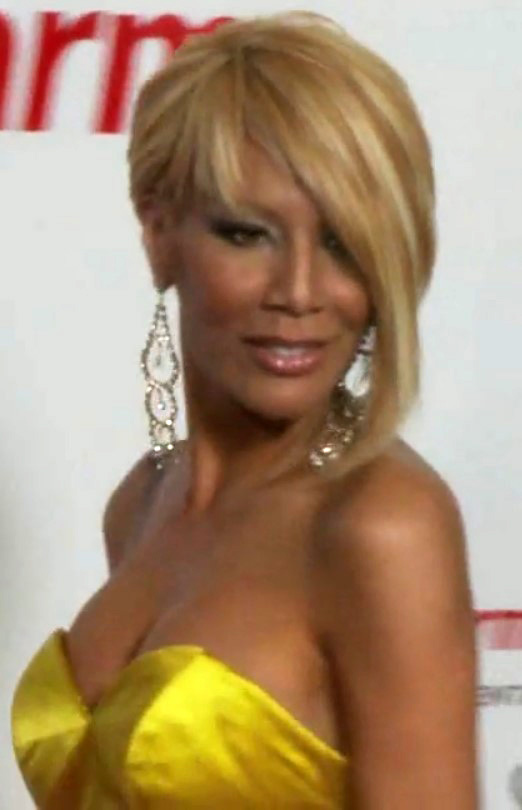
Daddy Yankee and Ivy Queen became one of the pioneers of reggaeton music in the 2000s.

One of the most popular genres of the Latin music genre was reggaeton. Originally only played at underground clubs such as in Puerto Rico and persecuted by the police, the genre became mainstream thanks to artists such as Daddy Yankee, Don Omar Wisin & Yandel, Tego Calderón, and Ivy Queen. Daddy Yankee hit song, "Gasolina" and the album Barrio Fino (2004) was cited as the records that pushed reggaeton's success outside of Puerto Rico and Panama. In addition, a 2009 a book named Reggaeton credited "La Tortura" by Shakira and Alejandro Sanz" for popularizing the genre in regions such as North America, Europe, and Asia. Although not as popular as reggaeton, Latin hip hop, particularly those by Mexican acts such as Akwid and Frankie J received radio airplay in the mainstream Latin charts. The latter became success with his cover of Aventura's song "Obsesión".

=== Latin rock/alternative ===
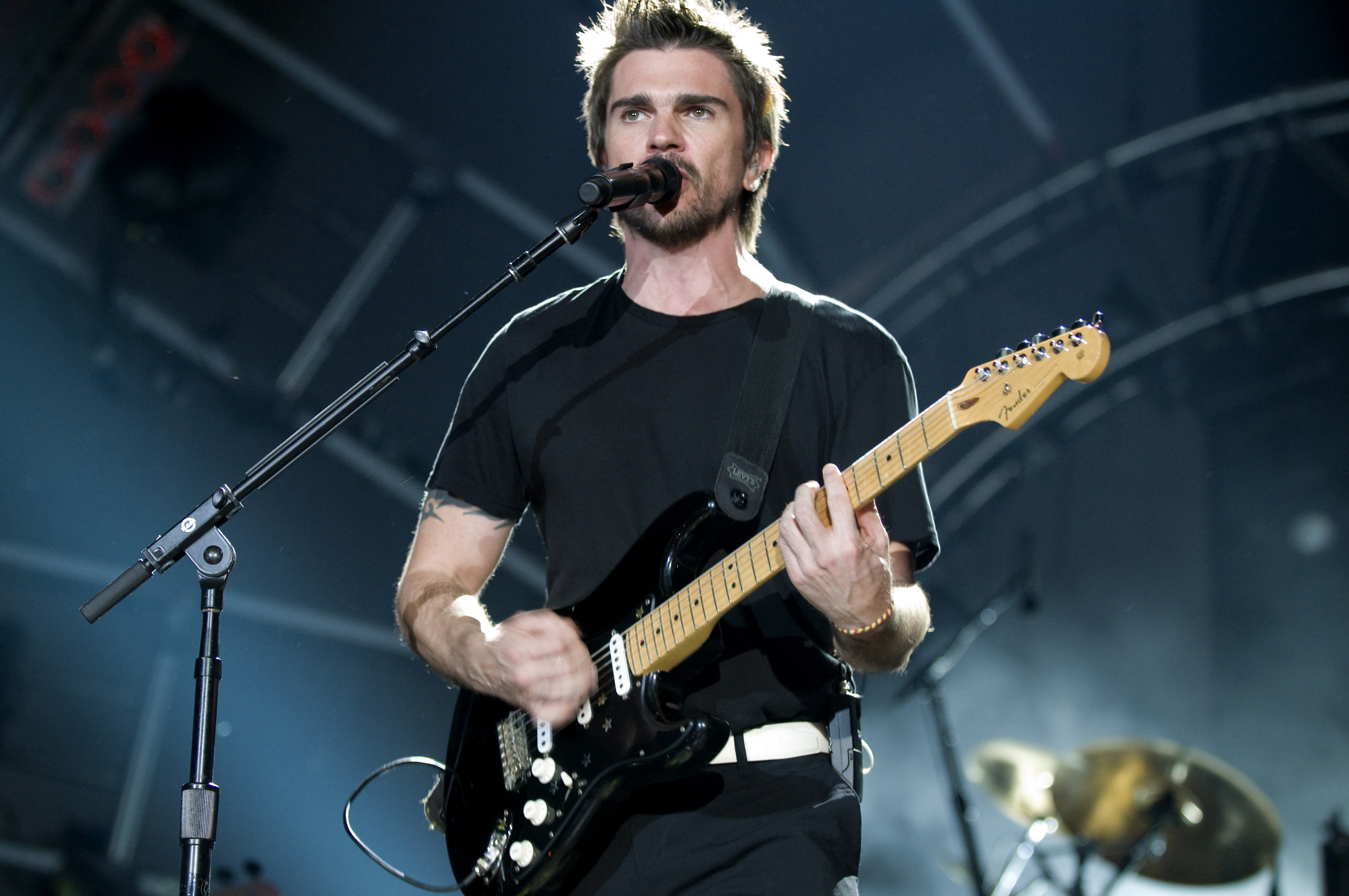
Juanes became a mainstream breakthrough in the rock en español movement

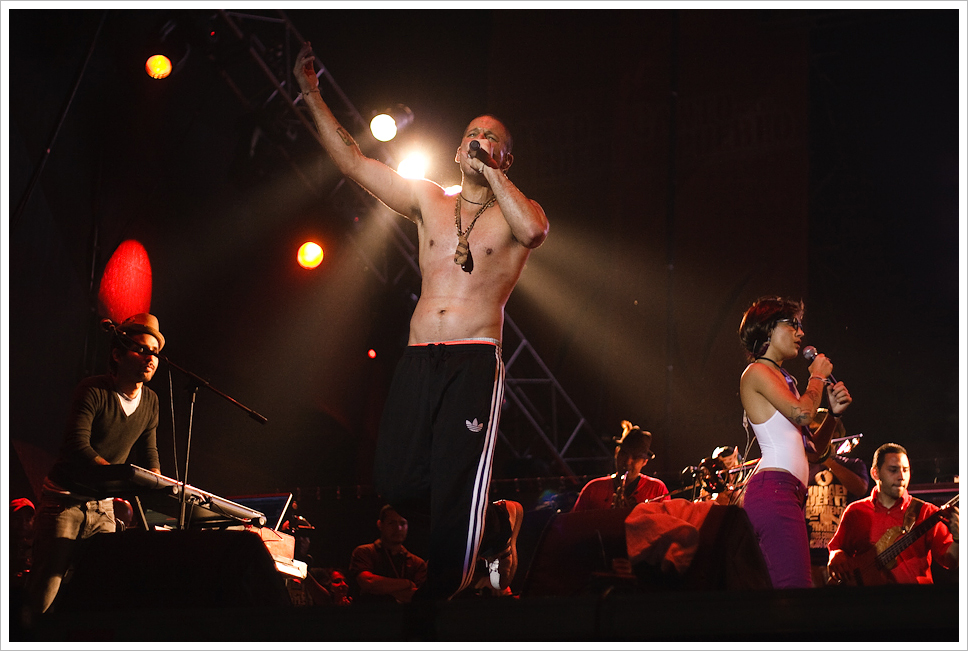
Calle 13 became known for their social conscious songs in the Latin alternative scene

The rock en español continued its popularity into the 2000s with the focus on pop rock with rock acts such as Maná, Shakira, and Ricardo Arjona remaining the spotlight. Juanes became a breakthrough artist and spent 20 weeks at number one on the Hot Latin Songs chart with his song "Me Enamora". Likewise, Latin alternative music continued to be played mostly underground but acts such as Calle 13 and Black Guayaba emerged as the genre's frontrunners. The former became known for their social conscious songs addressing topics such as poverty and government corruption.

== Best-selling records ==
=== Best-selling albums ===
The following is a list of the top 10 best-selling Latin albums in the United States of the 2000s, according to Billboard.

Rank	Album	Artist
1	Barrio Fino	Daddy Yankee
2	Fijación Oral, Vol. 1	Shakira
3	Barrio Fino en Directo	Daddy Yankee
4	Mi Sangre	Juanes
5	Amar es Combatir	Maná
6	Un Día Normal	Juanes
7	Pa'l Mundo	Wisin & Yandel
8	King of Kings	Don Omar
9	Celestial	RBD
10	Para Siempre	Vicente Fernández

=== Best-performing songs ===
The following is a list of the top 10 best-performing Latin songs in the United States of the 2000s, according to Billboard.

Rank	Single	Artist
1	"A Puro Dolor"	Son by Four
2	"Te Quiero"	Flex
3	"La Tortura"	Shakira featuring Alejandro Sanz
4	"No Me Doy por Vencido"	Luis Fonsi
5	"Me Enamora"	Juanes
6	"Mi Corazoncito"	Aventura
7	"Aliado del Tiempo"	Mariano Barba
8	"Ella y Yo"	Aventura featuring Don Omar
9	"Si No Te Hubieras Ido"	Maná
10	"Abrázame Muy Fuerte"	Juan Gabriel

== See also ==
- 2000s in music
