= Carita de Inocente =

2020 single by Prince Royce, Remix featuring Myke Towers

Single by Prince Royce Remix featuring Myke Towers

from the album Alter Ego
- Language: Spanish
- English title: Innocent Little Face
- Released: February 21, 2020; June 3, 2020 (Remix)
- Genre: Bachata
- Length: 3:11
- Label: Sony Latin
- Songwriters: Geoffrey Rojas; D’Lesly Lora; Yonathan Then
- Producers: Geoffrey Rojas; D’Lesly Lora

Prince Royce singles chronology
"Cita" (2020)	"Carita de Inocente" (2020)	"Luna Negra" (2020)

Myke Towers singles chronology
"Ponte Pa' Mí" (2020)	"Carita de Inocente (remix)" (2020)	"La Jeepeta (remix)" (2020)

Music video
- "Carita De Inocente" on YouTube "Carita De Inocente" (Remix) on YouTube

"Carita de Inocente" (English: "Innocent Little Face") is a song by Dominican-American singer Prince Royce from Royce's sixth studio album, Alter Ego (2020). The music video premiered on February 21, 2020. On June 3, 2020, Royce released a remix featuring Puerto Rican rapper Myke Towers. The music video for the remix version premiered on September 3, 2020.

== Charts ==
=== Weekly charts ===
Chart (2020)	Peak position
Spain (PROMUSICAE)	4
US Hot Latin Songs (Billboard)	15
US Latin Airplay (Billboard)	1
US Latin Pop Airplay (Billboard)	4
US Tropical Airplay (Billboard)	1

=== Year-end charts ===
Chart (2020)	position
US Hot Latin Songs (Billboard)	40
US Latin Airplay (Billboard)	2
US Latin Pop Airplay (Billboard)	11
US Tropical Airplay (Billboard)	1

== Certifications ==
Region	Certification	Certified units/sales
Mexico (AMPROFON)	Platinum	60,000^{‡}
Spain (Promusicae) Remix version	4× Platinum	400,000^{‡}
United States (RIAA)	4× Platinum (Latin)	240,000^{‡}
^{‡} Sales+streaming figures based on certification alone.

== See also ==
- List of Billboard Latin Airplay number ones of 2020
- List of Billboard Tropical Airplay number ones of 2020
