= Cúrame (Prince Royce song) =

Single by Prince Royce featuring Manuel Turizo

from the album Alter Ego
- Language: Spanish
- English title: "Cure Me"
- Released: June 7, 2019
- Length: 3:22
- Label: Sony Latin
- Songwriters: Geoffrey Rojas; Hydro; Weezy Kingz; Juan Medina Vélez; Xavier Semper; DJ Luian; Manuel Turizo; Jowny Boom Boom; Julian Turizo; Henry Pulman; Francis Diaz; Elvin Peña
- Producers: Mambo Kingz; DJ Luian

Prince Royce singles chronology
"Rosa" (2019)	"Cúrame" (2019)	"Morir Solo" (2019)

Manuel Turizo singles chronology
"Pa Olvidarte (Remix Oficial)" (2019)	"Cúrame" (2019)	"Aleluya" (2019)

Music video
- "Cúrame" on YouTube

"Cúrame" (English: "Cure Me") is a song by American singer Prince Royce and Colombian singer Manuel Turizo. The single was released on all music streaming platforms on June 7, 2019 as the third single for Royce's sixth studio album Alter Ego (2020). The music video was released the day before.

== Charts ==
=== Weekly charts ===
Chart (2019)	Peak position
Argentina Hot 100 (Billboard)	40
Spain (PROMUSICAE)	70
US Hot Latin Songs (Billboard)	31

== Certifications ==
Region	Certification	Certified units/sales
Mexico (AMPROFON)	Platinum+Gold	90,000^{‡}
Spain (Promusicae)	Gold	30,000^{‡}
United States (RIAA)	4× Platinum (Latin)	240,000^{‡}
^{‡} Sales+streaming figures based on certification alone.
