= List of Billboard Tropical Airplay number ones of 2018 =

The Billboard Tropical Airplay chart is a subchart of the Latin Airplay that ranks the best-performing tropical songs played on Latin radio stations in the United States.

== Chart history ==
Issue date	Song	Artist	Ref
January 3	"Bella y Sensual"	Romeo Santos featuring Nicky Jam & Daddy Yankee	
January 6	"Bella y Sensual"	Romeo Santos featuring Nicky Jam & Daddy Yankee	
January 13	"Bella y Sensual"	Romeo Santos featuring Nicky Jam & Daddy Yankee	
January 20	"Bella y Sensual"	Romeo Santos featuring Nicky Jam & Daddy Yankee	
January 27	"Casate Conmigo"	Silvestre Dangond x Nicky Jam	
February 3	"Casate Conmigo"	Silvestre Dangond x Nicky Jam	
February 10	"Casate Conmigo"	Silvestre Dangond x Nicky Jam	
February 17	"Casate Conmigo"	Silvestre Dangond x Nicky Jam	
February 24	"Casate Conmigo"	Silvestre Dangond x Nicky Jam	
March 3	"Casate Conmigo"	Silvestre Dangond x Nicky Jam	
March 10	"Casate Conmigo"	Silvestre Dangond x Nicky Jam	
March 17	"Casate Conmigo"	Silvestre Dangond x Nicky Jam	
March 24	"Déjala Que Vuelva"	Piso 21 featuring Manuel Turizo	
March 31	"Déjala Que Vuelva"	Piso 21 featuring Manuel Turizo	
April 7	"Sobredosis"	Romeo Santos featuring Ozuna	
April 14	"Sobredosis"	Romeo Santos featuring Ozuna	
April 21	"Oye Mujer"	Raymix	
April 28	"Oye Mujer"	Raymix	
May 5	"Oye Mujer"	Raymix	
May 12	"Oye Mujer"	Raymix	
May 19	"Oye Mujer"	Raymix	
May 26	"Oye Mujer"	Raymix	
June 2	"Oye Mujer"	Raymix	
June 9	"Oye Mujer"	Raymix	
June 16	"Oye Mujer"	Raymix	
June 23	"Oye Mujer"	Raymix	
June 30	"Oye Mujer"	Raymix	
July 7	"Sobredosis"	Romeo Santos featuring Ozuna	
July 14	"Sobredosis"	Romeo Santos featuring Ozuna	
July 21	"Sobredosis"	Romeo Santos featuring Ozuna	
July 28	"Sobredosis"	Romeo Santos featuring Ozuna	
August 4	"Sobredosis"	Romeo Santos featuring Ozuna	
August 11	"Sobredosis"	Romeo Santos featuring Ozuna	
August 18	"Sobredosis"	Romeo Santos featuring Ozuna	
August 25	"Sobredosis"	Romeo Santos featuring Ozuna	
September 1	"Hoy Tengo Tiempo (Pinto Sensual)"	Carlos Vives	
September 8	"Hoy Tengo Tiempo (Pinto Sensual)"	Carlos Vives	
September 15	"Hoy Tengo Tiempo (Pinto Sensual)"	Carlos Vives	
September 22	"Hoy Tengo Tiempo (Pinto Sensual)"	Carlos Vives	
September 29	"Hoy Tengo Tiempo (Pinto Sensual)"	Carlos Vives	
October 6	"Hoy Tengo Tiempo (Pinto Sensual)"	Carlos Vives	
October 13	"Centavito"	Romeo Santos	
October 20	"Centavito"	Romeo Santos	
October 27	"Centavito"	Romeo Santos	
November 3	"Centavito"	Romeo Santos	
November 10	"Centavito"	Romeo Santos	
November 17	"Centavito"	Romeo Santos	
November 24	"Centavito"	Romeo Santos	
December 1	"Centavito"	Romeo Santos	
December 8	"Centavito"	Romeo Santos	
December 15	"Centavito"	Romeo Santos	
December 22	"Centavito"	Romeo Santos	
December 29	"Centavito"	Romeo Santos	
