= Tropical fusion =

Subgenre of Latin music

Tropical fusion is a broad category of Latin music styles based on tropical music, which was used once as a genre for the 2012 Latin Grammy Awards as "Latin Grammy Award for Best Tropical Fusion Album."

The various musical genres comprising tropical fusion include Salsa, contemporary tropical, traditional tropical, cumbia, and vallenato. These musical genres have had a significant influence on tropical fusion.
