= 2013 in Latin music =

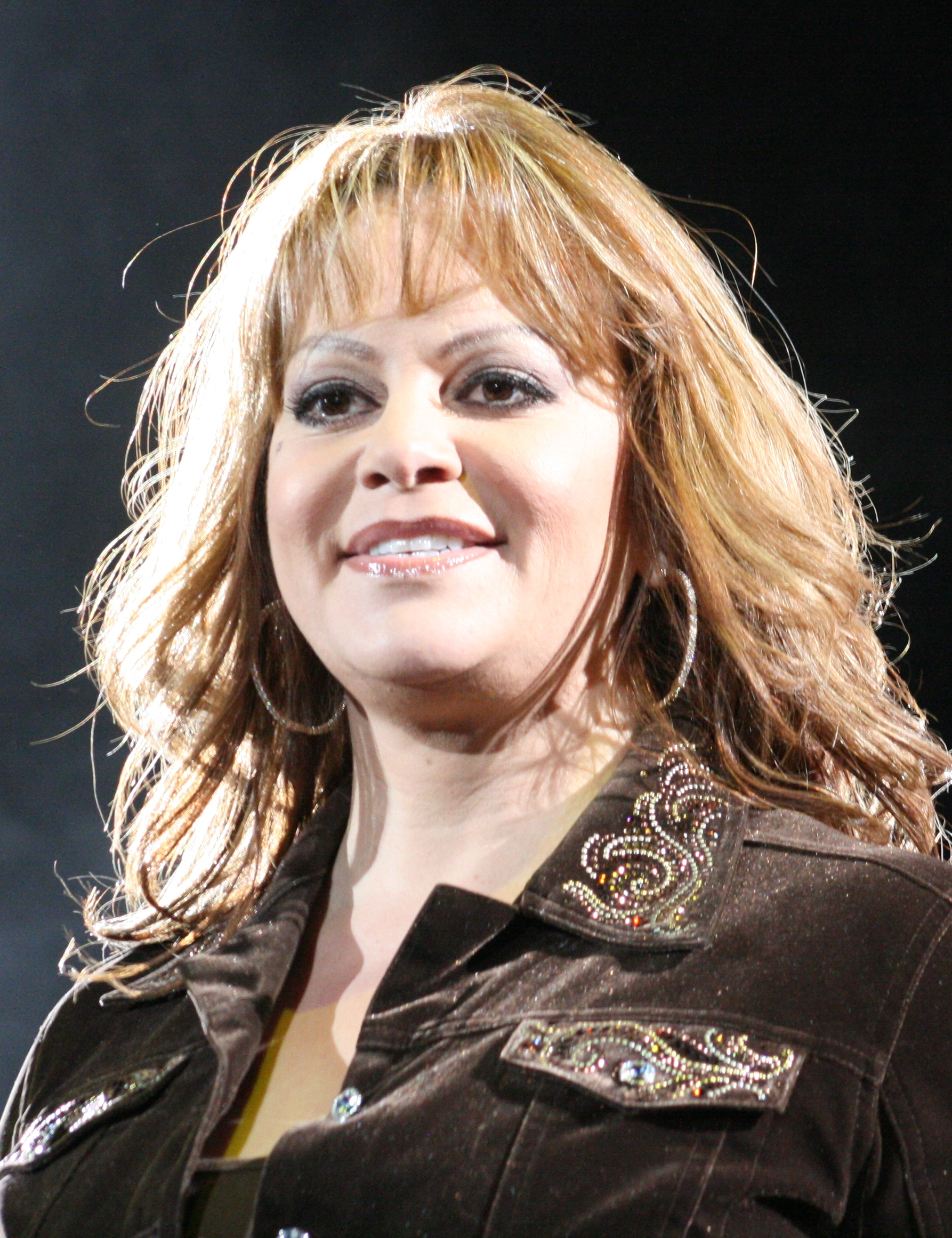
American singer Jenni Rivera was posthumously named Top Latin Artist of the Year in the United States by Billboard.

This is a list of notable events in Latin music (i.e. Spanish- and Portuguese-speaking music from Latin America, Europe, and the United States) that took place in 2013.

== Events ==
- April 2 – Spanish singer Julio Iglesias is acknowledged by the Guinness World Records as the bestselling Latin artist of all-time.
- May 13: – Tejano music singer Oscar De La Rosa (frontman of La Mafia) was physically assaulted by a fan after the singer refused to take a photo with him while attending a gay bar in Houston.
- November 20 – Cuban musician Arturo Sandoval is among sixteen people who received the Presidential Medal of Freedom.
- November 21 — The 14th Annual Latin Grammy Awards are held in Las Vegas.
  - "Vivir Mi Vida" by Marc Anthony wins Record of the Year.
  - "Volví a Nacer" by Andrés Castro and Carlos Vives wins Song of the Year.
  - Gaby Moreno wins Best New Artist.
  - Vida by Draco Rosa wins Album of the Year.
  - Miguel Bosé is recognized as the Person of the Year by the Latin Recording Academy.
- December 20 — The Recording Industry Association of America announces the creation of the Latin Digital Singles award for Latin digital singles and also lowers the threshold for Latin album certifications.

== Number-one albums and singles by country ==
- List of Hot 100 number-one singles of 2013 (Brazil)
- List of number-one songs of 2013 (Colombia)
- List of number-one albums of 2013 (Mexico)
- List of number-one albums of 2013 (Portugal)
- List of number-one albums of 2013 (Spain)
- List of number-one singles of 2013 (Spain)
- List of number-one Billboard Latin Albums from the 2010s
- List of number-one Billboard Hot Latin Songs of 2013

== Awards ==
- 2013 Premio Lo Nuestro
- 2013 Billboard Latin Music Awards
- 2013 Latin Grammy Awards
- 2013 Tejano Music Awards

== Albums released ==
=== First quarter ===
==== January ====
Day	Title	Artist	Genre(s)	Singles	Label
15	Boogaflow	Palmacoco			
18	Amarle	Vocal Song			
24	Vambora Lá Dançar	Elba Ramalho			
26	El Imperio Nazza: Doxis Edition	Musicologo y Menes, Jowell y Randy	Reggaeton		El Cartel Records, Live Music
29	Pasión	Andrea Bocelli			
29	La Estructura	Noel Torres			
29	Muchas Gracias	La Adictiva Banda de San José Mesillas			

==== February ====
Day	Title	Artist	Genre(s)	Singles	Label
5	La Original y Sus Boleros de Amor	La Original Banda El Limón de Salvador Lizárraga			
11	My World 2	Dyland & Lenny			
11	Eggun	Omar Sosa			
17	La Compensa	Calibre 50			
18	Latin Jazz – Jazz Latin	Wayne Wallace Latin Jazz Quartet			
19	Tierra	Vicente Amigo			
19	#AC	Ana Carolina			

==== March ====
Day	Title	Artist	Genre(s)	Singles	Label
1	Sacode!	Nevilton			
5	Entre Venas	Rigú			
5	Presente	Bajofondo			
5	99%	Ska-P			
5	Las Vueltas de La Vida	Banda Carnaval			
12	Tu Amigo Nada Más	Julión Álvarez y Su Norteño Banda			
12	Totalmente Juan Gabriel	Aida Cuevas			
18	Vida	Draco Rosa	Latin pop	"Más y Más"	
19	Los Momentos	Julieta Venegas			
25	Sold Out – En Vivo Desde El Nokia Theatre La Live	Gerardo Ortíz			
25	Encontré su amor	Mónica			
26	Repeat After Me	Los Amigos Invisibles			
26	13 Celebrando El 13	Joan Sebastian			
26	Raridade	Anderson Freire			

=== Second quarter ===
==== April ====
Day	Title	Artist	Genre(s)	Singles	Label
1	En Primera Fila – Dia 1	Cristian Castro	Latin pop	"Enamorados" "Así Era Ella" "Es Mejor Así"	Sony Music Latin
2	En Peligro de Extinción	Intocable			
2	El Free	Banda Los Recoditos			
2	Edu Lobo & Metropole Orkest	Edu Lobo			
9	Animal Nacional	Vespas Mandarinas			
9	Amor Favor Gracia	Lilly Goodman			
9	Más Que Amor	Il Volo			
10	Tango Nostalgias	Julio Botti			
12	Déjame Así	Maite Hontelé			
16	Dora Vergueiro	Dora Vergueiro			
22	Just Friends	David Lee Garza			
23	Corazón Profundo	Carlos Vives	Vallenato, champeta, cumbia, rock	"Volví a Nacer" "Como Le Gusta A Tu Cuerpo" "Bailar Contigo" "La Foto de los Dos"	Sony Music Latin
23	Hoy y Siempre	Los Canarios De Michoacán			
23	Trio	Paquito D'Rivera and Sérgio Assad & Odair Assad			
23	Vida Que Segue	Zeca Pagodinho			
27	Ojo Por Ojo	El Tri			
27	Destinología	Tan Biónica			
30	Treinta Días	La Santa Cecilia			

==== May ====
Day	Title	Artist	Genre(s)	Singles	Label
1	Gualberto + C4	Gualberto Ibarreto and C4 Trío			
5	¡Fantástico!	Lucky Díaz y La Familia Música			
6	Sambabook Martinho da Vila 2	Various artists			
7	Hoy	Vicente Fernández			
7	Libre Por Naturaleza	Duelo			
7	Amor Total	Toby Love	Bachata	"Lejos" "Todo Mí Amor Eres Tú" "Hey"	
13	Ultraleve	Ultraleve			
14	Asondeguerra Tour	Juan Luis Guerra y 4.40	"Frio, Frio"	Bachata, salsa, merengue	Capitol Latin
14	Será	La Vida Bohème			
14	La Velocidad de la Luz	Los Bunkers			
16	Una Mujer Que Canta	Albita			
17	El Show Máximo Nivel	Daniel Calderón y Los Gigantes			
21	Suerte	Tecupae			
21	What's Up?	Michel Camilo			
21	Sunset	Michel Teló			
24	El Imperio Nazza: Farruko Edition	Musicologo y Menes, Farruko	Reggaeton		El Cartel Records, Carbon Fiber Music
26	25 Años, 25 Éxitos, 25 Artistas	Orquesta Guayacán			
26	Herói	Ministério Adoração e Vida			
27	Versiones	Gian Marco			
27	Carnaval En Piano Charango	Chuchito Valdés and Eddy Navia			
28	Faith, Hope y Amor	Frankie J			
28	El Amor Manda	América Sierra			
28	Un Siglo De Pasión	Arturo Sandoval			
28	Romance de la Luna Tucumana	Diego El Cigala			
30	Sueños Clandestinos	Yordano			

==== June ====
Day	Title	Artist	Genre(s)	Singles	Label
2	Song for Maura	Paquito D'Rivera and Trio Corrente			
3	Caymmi	Nana, Dori and Danilo			
4	La Noche Más Larga	Buika			
4	Huellas	Charlie Cruz	Salsa	"Déjame Cambiarte la Vida" "Labios de Purpura" "Quiero Saber de Ti"	
11	Amsterdam Meets New Tango	Pablo Ziegler and Metropole Orkest			
13	La 9a Batalla	Silvestre Dangond and Rolando Ochoa			
14	Aor	Ed Motta			
18	Fruta	Caloncho			
18	Aquelarre	Sig Ragga			
21	The Monash Sessions	Hermeto Pascoal			
21	A Mi Manera	Mariachi Divas de Cindy Shea			
23	Soy Flamenco	Tomatito			
25	Llegó el momento	Fidel Nadal			
25	Sergio George Presents: Salsa Giants	Various artists	Salsa	"Para Celebrar"	Top Stop Music
25	Natalie Cole en Español	Natalie Cole			
25	Leslie Grace	Leslie Grace	Bachata	"Will You Love Me Tomorrow" "Day 1" "Odio No Odiarte"	
25	Me Llamaré Tuyo	Víctor Manuelle	Salsa	"Me Llamaré Tuyo"	
29	XSPB 12	Xuxa			

=== Third quarter ===
==== July ====
Day	Title	Artist	Genre(s)	Singles	Label
8	Border-Free	Chucho Valdés and the Afro-Cuban Messengers			
9	Romeo y Su Nieta	Paquita la del Barrio			
19	Mais Amor	Diogo Nogueira			
23	3.0	Marc Anthony	Salsa, bolero	"Vivir Mi Vida" "Cambio de Piel" "Flor Pálida" "Volver a Comenzar"	Sony Music Latin, Columbia Records
30	Una Mujer	Olga Tañón	Merengue	"Todo lo Que Sube Baja"	

==== August ====
Day	Title	Artist	Genre(s)	Singles	Label
6	Gracias Por Creer	La Arrolladora Banda El Limón			
6	The Vigil	Chick Corea			
12	Alchemya	Juan Carmona			
13	¿Quien Dice Que No?	Oscar Cruz			
13	Grandes Canciones	Cristina			
15	Nunca Tem Fim...	O Rappa			
20	Los Psychos Del Corrido Los Psicópatas	Los Inquietos Del Norte			
20	Irremplazable	El Trono de México			
20	Los Sucesores	J King & Maximan			
23	Solo Pa' Los Jóvenes... de Corazón	Pijuan and Los Baby Boomer Boys			
26	Salsa Roja	Berta Rojas			
27	Confidencias	Alejandro Fernández	Latin pop	"Hoy Tengo Ganas de Ti" "Me Olvidé de Vivir"	Universal Music Latino
27	Especialista	Regulo Caro			
27	Yo	Roberto Fonseca			
27	Verdi	Plácido Domingo			
28	Bohemio	Andrés Calamaro			

==== September ====
Day	Title	Artist	Genre(s)	Singles	Label
1	Take It Easy My Brother Jorge	Adryana Ribeiro			
2	El Caballo de Oro	Reynaldo Armas			
10	El Anonimato	Anonimus	Reggaeton		Flow Music
15	La Carta Perfecta – En Vivo	Danilo Montero			
17	Con La Frente en Auto	Luis Coronel			
17	Lástima que sean ajenas	Pepe Aguilar			
17	Renacimiento	Pablo Milanés			
17	Questão De Tempo	Sérgio Reis			
20	Romantisísmico	Babasónicos			
20	Nuevo	Lenny Salcedo			
24	Party & Dance	Limi-T 21	Merengue	"Solo Busco Amor" "Con los Manos Arriba"	
24	Por Ti	Pesado			
28	ABC Fiesta	Mister G			
30	Viva Por Mim	Victor & Leo			

=== Fourth quarter ===
==== October ====
Day	Title	Artist	Genre(s)	Singles	Label
1	Wolverines	Vega			
7	The Pedrito Martinez Group	Pedrito Martinez Group	Afro-Cuban		Motéma Music
8	Métete en el Viaje	Dubán Bayona & Jimmy Zambrano			
8	Soy el Mismo	Prince Royce	Bachata	"Darte un Beso" "Te Robaré" "Soy el Mismo" "Solita"	Sony Music Latin
8	Forever Mazz	Jimmy González & Grupo Mazz			
8	La Familia 013	Charlie Brown Jr.			
14	Fatum	Rosario La Tremendita			
15	Medea	Manuel Barrueco and the Symphony Orchestra of Tenerife			
16	Celedón Sin Fronteras 1	Jorge Celedón and various artists			
16	La Voz del Ídolo	Alejandro Palacio			
18	De Graça	Jeneci			
19	Libertad	Airbag			
22	El Corazón Decide	Ednita Nazario			
22	Gracias Por Estar Aquí	Marco Antonio Solís	Latin pop	"Tres Semanas" "De Mil Amores"	Universal Music Latino
22	50 Anniversario	El Gran Combo de Puerto Rico			
22	25 Años de Música	Los Cafres			
22	Multishow Ao Vivo – Um Ser Amor	Paula Fernandes			
29	La Familia	J Balvin			
29	Haciendo Historia	Banda el Recodo de Cruz Lizárraga			
29	King Daddy	Daddy Yankee	Reggaeton	"La Nueva y la Ex"	
29	Palosanto	Bunbury			
29	Coloreando: Traditional Songs For Children In Spanish	Marta Gómez and Friends			
30	Calle	Mónica Navarro			

==== November ====
Day	Title	Artist	Genre(s)	Singles	Label
1	Salve Gonzagão 100 Anos	Various artists			
2	Geração De Jesus	Jotta A			
5	De Líder a Leyenda	Yandel	Reggaeton, electropop, Latin pop	"Hablé de Ti" "Hasta Abajo" "Moviendo Caderas" "Plakito"	Sony Music Latin
5	Amor en Portofino	Andrea Bocelli			
5	Orígenes: El Bolero Volumen 2	Café Quijano			
5	Céu Na Terra	Soraya Moraes			
5	Funky Funky Boom Boom	Jota Quest			
7	Sigo Esperándote	Marcos Vidal			
12	Vuelve en Primera Fila	Franco de Vita	Latin pop	"Te Pienso Sin Querer" "Y Tú Te Vas"	Sony Music Latin
19	Sentimiento, Elegancia & Maldad	Arcángel			
19	20 – Grandes Éxitos	Laura Pausini	Latin pop	"Limpio" "Víveme" "Se fue" "Donde quedo sólo yo" "Sino a ti"	
19	Mis Mejores Recuerdos	Tito Nieves			
19	8 Lunas	Rosana			
19	Bésame Mucho España	Olivia Gorra			
19	Fin De Semana	La Original Banda El Limón De Salvador Lizárraga			
19	Graça	Aline Barros			
23	De Mi Corazón	Shelly Lares			
25	Behind the Machine (Detrás de la Máquina)	ChocQuibTown			
27	Opus IV	Viento de Agua			
28	Sei, Como Foi Em BH	Nando Reis e Os Infernais			

==== December ====
Day	Title	Artist	Genre(s)	Singles	Label
3	1969 - Siempre, En Vivo Desde Monterrey, Parte 1	Jenni Rivera			
3	La Guzmán: Primera Fila	Alejandra Guzmán	Latin pop	"Mi Peor Error"	Sony Music Mexico
9	Cantándole a Mi Valle	Juan Piña			
9	O Samba É Do Bem	Paula Lima			
10	One Flag	Elvis Crespo	Merengue	"Pegaito Suavecito" "Sopa de Caracol"	
12	Bom De Dança Vol. 2	Rick & Renner			
16	La Vida del Artista	Diomedes Díaz and Álvaro López			
17	Mujeres Divinas	Juan Montalvo			
17	Anthology Back In The Day	Jay Perez			

=== Unknown ===
Title	Artist	Genre(s)	Singles	Label
Poderoso	Grupo Manía	Merengue	"No Tengo el Valor" "Conmigo Te Vas"	
Vikorg	Señor Loop			
Fiesta para los muertos	Alejandro y María Laura			

== Best-selling records ==
=== Best-selling albums ===
The following is a list of the top 10 best-selling Latin albums in the United States in 2013, according to Billboard.

Rank	Album	Artist
1	La Misma Gran Señora	Jenni Rivera
2	3.0	Marc Anthony
3	Joyas Prestadas: Pop	Jenni Rivera
4	Joyas Prestadas: Banda	Jenni Rivera
5	Confidencias	Alejandro Fernández
6	Pasión	Andrea Bocelli
7	Las Bandas Románticas de América 2013	Various artists
8	Exiliados en la Bahía: Lo Mejor de Maná	Maná
9	#1's	Prince Royce
10	La Música No Se Toca	Alejandro Sanz

=== Best-performing songs ===
The following is a list of the top 10 best-performing Latin songs in the United States in 2013, according to Billboard.

Rank	Single	Artist
1	"Vivir Mi Vida"	Marc Anthony
2	"Limbo"	Daddy Yankee
3	"Darte un Beso"	Prince Royce
4	"Zumba"	Don Omar
5	"Propuesta Indecente"	Romeo Santos
6	"Algo Me Gusta de Ti"	Wisin & Yandel featuring Chris Brown and T-Pain
7	"Llévame Contigo"	Romeo Santos
8	"La Pregunta"	J Alvarez
9	"Loco"	Enrique Iglesias featuring Romeo Santos
10	"El Ruido de Tus Zapatos"	La Arrolladora Banda el Limón de Rene Camacho

== Deaths ==
- February 15 – Francisco Fellove, 89, Cuban singer and composer
- March 1 – Rafael Puyana, 81, Colombian harpsichordist.
- March 6 – Chorão, 42, Brazilian singer-songwriter (Charlie Brown Jr.), skateboarder and screenwriter, cocaine overdose.
- March 14 – Daniel Ponce, 59, Cuban percussionist
- March 20 – Emílio Santiago, 66, Brazilian singer, complications from a stroke.
- March 22:
  - Gerardo Gandini, 76, Argentine pianist and composer
  - Bebo Valdés, 94, Cuban pianist, bandleader, composer and arranger, Alzheimer's disease.
- April 8 – Sara Montiel, 85, Spanish singer and actress
- April 22 – Pajarito Zaguri, 72,
- May 4 – César Portillo de la Luz, 90, Cuban Filin composer and interpreter.
- May 8 – Delia Rigal, 92, Argentine soprano
- May 9 – Juan Tarodo, 52, Spanish musician and producer
- May 12 – Marià Albero, 63, Spanish singer and songwriter
- May 15 – Manolo Galván, 66, Spanish/Argentine singer-songwriter
- June 1 – Baltazar "Balta" Hinojosa, 31, Mexican American composer and producer
- June 22 – Leandro Díaz, 90, Colombian composer
- July 7 – MC Daleste, 20, Brazilian rapper
- July 18 – Horacio Avendaño, 52, Argentine saxophonist
- July 23 – Dominguinhos, 72, Brazilian composer and singer, infection and cardiac complications.
- July 25 – Steve Berrios, 68, American jazz drummer.
- August 5 – Horacio Icasto, 72, Argentine pianist and composer
- August 7 – Betty Pino, 65, Ecuadorian radio host
- August 9:
  - Eduardo Falú, 90, Argentine folk guitarist and composer
  - Eddie Pérez, 77, Puerto Rican saxophonist for El Gran Combo de Puerto Rico
- August 10 – Eydie Gormé, 84, American singer
- September 18 – Johnny Laboriel, 71, Mexican rock 'n' roll singer, prostate cancer.
- September 27 – Oscar Castro-Neves, 73, Brazilian guitarist, arranger, and composer
- October 6 – Senén Suárez, 91, Cuban guitarist, songwriter, arranger, and author de nombre artístico Senén Suárez,
- October 24 – Manolo Escobar, 82, Spanish actor and singer
- November 30 – João Araújo, 78, Brazilian record label executive
- December 9 – Roberto Maza, Colombian manager
- December 22 – Diomedes Díaz, 56, Colombian vallenato singer and songwriter
