= List of awards and nominations received by Carlos Vives =

Carlos Vives awards and nominations
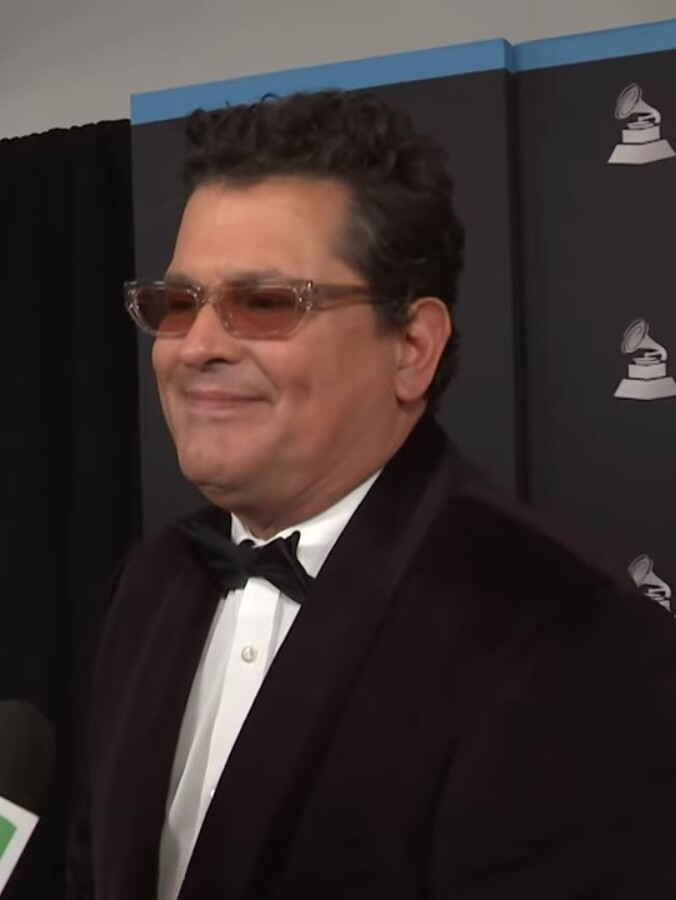
- Vives at the Latin Grammy Awards 2021
Awards and nominations
Award	Wins	Nominations
Billboard	0	1
Grammy	2	8
World Music	0	3
Billboard Latin Music Awards	3	19
Latin Grammy Awards	18	47
Latin American Music Awards	3	13
Fonogram Awards	3	13
Los 40 Music Awards	1	5
Lo Nuestro Awards	10	60
Premios Nuestra Tierra	18	62

Totals (Note: Certain award groups do not simply award one winner. They acknowledge several different recipients, have runners-up, and have third place. Since this is a specific recognition and is different from losing an award, runner-up mentions are considered wins in this award tally. For simplification and to avoid errors, each award in this list has been presumed to have had a prior nomination.)
- Wins: 66
- Nominations: 253

This is a list of awards and nominations received by Carlos Vives, a Colombian singer and songwriter. He is winner of two Grammy Awards, eighteen Latin Grammy Awards, three Billboard Latin Music Awards and ten Lo Nuestro Awards.

Vives was also honored with several honoree for his songwriting and producer contribution including the BMI President's Award, the ASCAP Founders Award, and the Billboard Latin Music Hall of Fame Award. In 2019, Vives was selected as #45 on both the Greatest of All Time Latin Artists and Top Latin Artists 2010s by Billboard.

== Awards and nominations ==
Award	Year	Category	Work	Result	Ref.
ASCAP Latin Awards	2020	Award Winning Songs	"Si Me Das Tu Amor"	Won	
ASCAP Latin Awards	2022	Award Winning Songs	"Canción Bonita"	Won	
ASCAP Latin Awards	2024	ASCAP Founders Award	Himself	Won	
Billboard Music Award	2017	Top Latin Song	"La Bicicleta" (with Shakira)	Nominated	
Billboard Latin Music Awards	1995	Pop Album of the Year, New Artist	Clásicos de la Provincia	Won	
Billboard Latin Music Awards	2000	Tropical/Salsa Album of the Year, Male	El Amor de Mi Tierra	Nominated	
Billboard Latin Music Awards	2001	Tropical/Salsa Album of the Year, Male	El Amor de Mi Tierra	Won	
Billboard Latin Music Awards	2002	Tropical/Salsa Album of the Year, Male	Dejame Entrar	Nominated	
Billboard Latin Music Awards	2014	Hot Latin Song of the Year, Vocal Event	"Como Le Gusta a Tu Cuerpo"	Nominated	
Billboard Latin Music Awards	2014	Latin Pop Album of the Year	orazón Profundo	Nominated	
Billboard Latin Music Awards	2017	Latin Pop Songs Artist of the Year, Solo	Himself	Nominated	
Billboard Latin Music Awards	2017	Hot Latin Song of the Year	"La Bicicleta" (feat Shakira)	Nominated	
Billboard Latin Music Awards	2017	Vocal Event	"La Bicicleta" (feat Shakira)	Nominated	
Billboard Latin Music Awards	2017	Airplay Song of the Year	"La Bicicleta" (feat Shakira)	Nominated	
Billboard Latin Music Awards	2017	Digital Song of the Year	"La Bicicleta" (feat Shakira)	Nominated	
Billboard Latin Music Awards	2017	Latin Pop Song of the Year	"La Bicicleta" (feat Shakira)	Nominated	
Billboard Latin Music Awards	2018	Tropical Album of the Year	Vives	Nominated	
Billboard Latin Music Awards	2019	Tropical Song of the Year	"Hoy Tengo Tiempo (Pinta Sensual)"	Nominated	
Billboard Latin Music Awards	2019	Tropical Artist of the Year	Himself	Nominated	
Billboard Latin Music Awards	2020	Hall of Fame	Himself	Inducted	
Billboard Latin Music Awards	2021	Tropical Artist of the Year	Himself	Nominated	
Billboard Latin Music Awards	2022	Tropical Artist of the Year, Solo	Himself	Nominated	
Billboard Latin Music Awards	2022	Tropical Album of the Year	Cumbiana II	Nominated	
BMI Latin Music Awards	2014	President's Award	Himself	Won	
BMI Latin Music Awards	2014	Award Winning Songs	"Como Le Gusta A Tu Cuerpo"	Won	
BMI Latin Music Awards	2014	Award Winning Songs	"Volví A Nacer"	Won	
BMI Latin Music Awards	2015	Award Winning Songs	"Bailar Contigo"	Won	
BMI Latin Music Awards	2015	Award Winning Songs	"La Foto De Los Dos"	Won	
Grammy Awards	2000	Best Traditional Tropical Latin Performance	El Amor de Mi Tierra	Nominated	
Grammy Awards	2002	Best Traditional Tropical Latin Album	Déjame Entrar	Won	
Grammy Awards	2005	Best Latin Pop Album	El Rock de Mi Pueblo	Nominated	
Grammy Awards	2014	Best Tropical Latin Album	Corazón Profundo	Nominated	
Grammy Awards	2015	Best Tropical Latin Album	Más + Corazón Profundo	Won	
Grammy Awards	2019	Best Latin Pop Album	Vives	Nominated	
Grammy Awards	2023	Best Tropical Latin Album	Cumbiana II	Nominated	
Grammy Awards	2024	Best Tropical Latin Album	Escalona Nunca Se Había Grabado Así	Nominated	
Heat Latin Music Awards	2016	Best Tropical Artist	Himself	Nominated	
Heat Latin Music Awards	2017	Gold Award	Himself	Won	
Heat Latin Music Awards	2017	Best Tropical Artist	Himself	Won	
Heat Latin Music Awards	2017	Best Artist Andean Region	Himself	Nominated	
Heat Latin Music Awards	2019	Best Male Artist	Himself	Nominated	
Heat Latin Music Awards	2019	Best Tropical Artist	Himself	Nominated	
Heat Latin Music Awards	2020	Best Tropical Artist	Himself	Nominated	
Heat Latin Music Awards	2021	Best Tropical Artist	Himself	Nominated	
Heat Latin Music Awards	2022	Best Tropical Artist	Himself	Won	
Heat Latin Music Awards	2022	Best Male Artist	Himself	Nominated	
Heat Latin Music Awards	2022	Premio Compromiso	Himself	Won	
Heat Latin Music Awards	2022	Best Collaboration	"La Mitad" (with Mike Bahia)	Nominated	
Heat Latin Music Awards	2023	Best Tropical Artist	Himself	Nominated	
Heat Latin Music Awards	2023	Best Video	"For Sale" (with Gilberto Santa Rosa)	Nominated	
Heat Latin Music Awards	2024	Best Tropical Artist	Himself	Nominated	
Latin Grammy Awards	2000	Album of the Year	El Amor de Mi Tierra	Nominated	
Latin Grammy Awards	2000	Best Traditional Tropical Album	El Amor de Mi Tierra	Nominated	
Latin Grammy Awards	2000	Record Of the Year	"Fruta Fresca"	Nominated	
Latin Grammy Awards	2000	Song of the Year	"Fruta Fresca"	Nominated	
Latin Grammy Awards	2000	Best Male Pop Vocal Performance	"Fruta Fresca"	Nominated	
Latin Grammy Awards	2000	Best Tropical Song	"Fruta Fresca"	Nominated	
Latin Grammy Awards	2002	Album of the Year	Déjame Entrar	Nominated	
Latin Grammy Awards	2002	Best Contemporary Tropical Album	Déjame Entrar	Won	
Latin Grammy Awards	2002	Record of the Year	"Déjame Entrar"	Nominated	
Latin Grammy Awards	2002	Song of the Year	"Déjame Entrar"	Nominated	
Latin Grammy Awards	2002	Best Tropical Song	"Déjame Entrar"	Won	
Latin Grammy Awards	2002	Best Short Form Music Video	"Déjame Entrar"	Nominated	
Latin Grammy Awards	2005	Best Contemporary Tropical Album	El Rock de Mi Pueblo	Won	
Latin Grammy Awards	2005	Best Tropical Song	"Como Tú"	Nominated	
Latin Grammy Awards	2009	Best Latin Children's Album	Pombo Musical (Varios Artistas)	Won	
Latin Grammy Awards	2013	Album of the Year	Corazón Profundo	Nominated	
Latin Grammy Awards	2013	Best Tropical Fusion Album	Corazón Profundo	Won	
Latin Grammy Awards	2013	Record of the Year	"Volví a Nacer"	Nominated	
Latin Grammy Awards	2013	Song of the Year	"Volví a Nacer"	Won	
Latin Grammy Awards	2013	Best Tropical Song	"Volví a Nacer"	Won	
Latin Grammy Awards	2014	Album of the Year	Más Corazón Profundo	Nominated	
Latin Grammy Awards	2014	Best Contemporary Tropical Album	Más Corazón Profundo	Won	
Latin Grammy Awards	2014	"Record of the Year"	"El Mar de Sus Ojos"	Nominated	
Latin Grammy Awards	2014	"Record of the Year"	"Cuando Nos Volvamos a Encontrar"	Nominated	
Latin Grammy Awards	2014	Song of the Year	"Cuando Nos Volvamos a Encontrar"	Nominated	
Latin Grammy Awards	2014	Best Tropical Song	"Cuando Nos Volvamos a Encontrar"	Won	
Latin Grammy Awards	2016	Record of the Year	"La Bicicleta" (with Shakira)	Won	
Latin Grammy Awards	2016	Song of the Year	"La Bicicleta" (with Shakira)	Won	
Latin Grammy Awards	2018	Song of the Year	"Robarte un Beso"	Nominated	
Latin Grammy Awards	2018	Best Contemporary Tropical Album	Vives	Won	
Latin Grammy Awards	2019	Best Long Form Music Video	Déjame Quererte	Nominated	
Latin Grammy Awards	2020	Album of the Year	Cumbiana	Nominated	
Latin Grammy Awards	2020	Best Contemporary Tropical Album	Cumbiana	Won	
Latin Grammy Awards	2020	Song of the Year	"For Sale" (with Alejandro Sanz)	Nominated	
Latin Grammy Awards	2020	Best Tropical Song	"Canción para Rubén" (with Rubén Blades)	Won	
Latin Grammy Awards	2020	Best Tropical Song	"Búscame" (with Kany García)	Nominated	
Latin Grammy Awards	2020	Best Long Form Music Video	El Mundo Perdido de Cumbiana	Nominated	
Latin Grammy Awards	2021	Song of the Year	"Canción Bonita" (with Ricky Martin)	Nominated	
Latin Grammy Awards	2021	Best Pop Song	"Canción Bonita" (with Ricky Martin)	Nominated	
Latin Grammy Awards	2022	Song of the Year	"Baloncito Viejo" (with Camilo)	Nominated	
Latin Grammy Awards	2022	Record of the Year	"Baloncito Viejo" (with Camilo)	Nominated	
Latin Grammy Awards	2022	Best Pop Song	"Baloncito Viejo" (with Camilo)	Nominated	
Latin Grammy Awards	2022	Best Pop/Rock Song	"Babel" (with Fito Páez)	Won	
Latin Grammy Awards	2022	Best Contemporary Tropical Album	Cumbiana II	Won	
Latin Grammy Awards	2022	Best Tropical Song	"El Parrandero (Masters en Parranda)" (with Sin Ánimo De Lucro, JBot & Tuti)	Nominated	
Latin Grammy Awards	2023	Album of the Year	Escalona Nunca Se Había Grabado Así	Nominated	
Latin Grammy Awards	2023	Best Cumbia/Vallenato Album	Escalona Nunca Se Había Grabado Así	Won	
Latin American Music Awards	2015	Favorite Collaboration	"Nota de Amor" (with Daddy Yankee and Wisin)	Nominated	
Latin American Music Awards	2018	Favorite Pop Song	"Robarte un Beso" (with Sebastián Yatra)	Won	
Latin American Music Awards	2018	Favorite Tropical Album	Vives	Nominated	
Latin American Music Awards	2019	Favorite Tropical Artist	Himself	Nominated	
Latin American Music Awards	2021	Favorite Tropical Song	"No Te Vayas"	Won	
Latin American Music Awards	2021	Favorite Tropical Album	Cumbiana	Nominated	
Latin American Music Awards	2021	Favorite Virtual Concert	#NoTeVayasDeTuCasa	Nominated	
Latin American Music Awards	2022	Favorite Tropical Song	“Colombia, Mi Encanto”	Nominated	
Latin American Music Awards	2022	Favorite Tropical Artist	Himself	Nominated	
Latin American Music Awards	2023	Favorite Tropical Album	Cumbiana II	Nominated	
Latin American Music Awards	2023	Favorite Tropical Artist	Himself	Nominated	
Latin American Music Awards	2023	Legacy Award	Himself	Won	
Latin American Music Awards	2024	Favorite Tropical Artist	Himself	Nominated	
LOS40 Music Awards	2014	Best Colombian Act	Himself	Nominated	
LOS40 Music Awards	2014	Best Spanish Language Album	Corazón profundo	Nominated	
LOS40 Music Awards	2016	Best Latin Artist	Himself	Nominated	
LOS40 Music Awards	2016	Golden Music Awards	"La Bicicleta" (with Shakira)	Won	
LOS40 Music Awards	2016	Global Show Award	"La Bicicleta" (with Shakira)	Nominated	
MTV MIAW Awards	2017	Best Party Anthem	"La Bicicleta" (with Shakira)	Nominated	
Premios Juventud	2016	Mi Artista Tropical	Himself	Nominated	
Premios Juventud	2017	The Perfect Combination	"La Bicicleta" (with Shakira)	Nominated	
Premios Juventud	2017	Best Song For "Chillin"	"La Bicicleta" (with Shakira)	Nominated	
Premios Juventud	2020	#Stay Home Concert Award	#NoTeVayasDeTuCasa El Show	Nominated	
Premios Juventud	2020	The Quarentune Award	"Color esperanza (2020)"	Nominated	
Premios Juventud	2022	The Perfect Mix	"Canción Bonita" (with Ricky Martin)	Nominated	
Premios Juventud	2022	Best Tropical Mix	"Besos En Cualquier Horario" (with Mau y Ricky & Lucy Vives)	Nominated	
Premios Juventud	2022	Best Tropical Hit	"Cumbiana"	Nominated	
Premios Juventud	2023	Best Tropical Album	Cumbiana II	Nominated	
Premios Juventud	2023	Best Tropical Mix	"Cumbia Del Corazón" (with Los Ángeles Azules)	Nominated	
Premios Juventud	2023	Video with the Most Powerful Message	"Montaña Solitaria" (with ChocQuibTown)	Nominated	
Premios Juventud	2023	The Hottest Choreography	"El Teke Teke" (withBlack Eyed Peas & Play-N-Skillz)	Nominated	
Premios Juventud	2024	Best Tropical Album	Clásicos de la Provincia 30 Años	Nominated	
Premios Juventud	2024	Best Tropical Mix	"Las Mujeres" (with Juanes)	Nominated	
Premios Juventud	2024	The Perfect Mix	"Las Mujeres" (with Juanes)	Nominated	
Premio Lo Nuestro	1989	Pop New Artist of the Year	Himself	Nominated	
Premio Lo Nuestro	1996	Male Artist of the Year, Tropical/Salsa	Himself	Won	
Premio Lo Nuestro	1996	Tropical/Salsa Song of the Year	"La Gota Fría"	Won	
Premio Lo Nuestro	1996	Pop Album of the Year	Clásicos de la Provincia	Nominated	
Premio Lo Nuestro	1996	Tropical/Salsa Album of the Year	La Tierra del Olvido	Nominated	
Premio Lo Nuestro	1996	Video of the Year	"La Tierra del Olvido"	Nominated	
Premio Lo Nuestro	1996	La Tierra del Olvido	Tropical/Salsa Album of the Year	Nominated	
Premio Lo Nuestro	1996	Video of the Year	"La Tierra del Olvido"	Nominated	
Premio Lo Nuestro	1998	Video of the Year	"Que Diera"	Nominated	
Premio Lo Nuestro	2000	Tropical/Salsa Album of the Year	El Amor de Mi Tierra	Nominated	
Premio Lo Nuestro	2001	Traditional Performance	Himself	Won	
Premio Lo Nuestro	2001	Internet Awards Tropical	Himself	Won	
Premio Lo Nuestro	2001	Tropical Song	"Fruta Fresca"	Nominated	
Premio Lo Nuestro	2005	Tropical Traditional Artist of the Year	Himself	Won	
Premio Lo Nuestro	2006	Tropical Male Artist	Himself	Nominated	
Premio Lo Nuestro	2006	Traditional Artist	Himself	Nominated	
Premio Lo Nuestro	2015	Tropical Male Artist	Himself	Nominated	
Premio Lo Nuestro	2015	Traditional Performance	Himself	Nominated	
Premio Lo Nuestro	2015	Tropical Collaboration of the Year	"Cuando Nos Volvamos a Encontrar"	Nominated	
Premio Lo Nuestro	2015	Video of the Year	"Cuando Nos Volvamos a Encontrar"	Nominated	
Premio Lo Nuestro	2015	Tropical Album	Más + Corazón Profundo	Nominated	
Premio Lo Nuestro	2016	Video Of The Year	"La Tierra del Olvido (live)"	Nominated	
Premio Lo Nuestro	2017	Tropical Artist Of The Year	Himself	Nominated	
Premio Lo Nuestro	2017	Single of the Year	"La Bicicleta" (with Shakira)	Won	
Premio Lo Nuestro	2017	Video of the Year	"La Bicicleta" (with Shakira)	Won	
Premio Lo Nuestro	2017	Tropical Song of the Year	"La Bicicleta" (with Shakira)	Won	
Premio Lo Nuestro	2017	Tropical Song of the Year	"Las Cosas de la Vida"	Nominated	
Premio Lo Nuestro	2019	Tropical Artist Of The Year	Himself	Won	
Premio Lo Nuestro	2019	Artist of the Year	Himself	Nominated	
Premio Lo Nuestro	2019	Tropical Collaboration of the Year	"Un Poquito" (with Diego Torres)	Nominated	
Premio Lo Nuestro	2019	Tropical Song of the Year	"Hoy Tengo Tiempo (Pinta Sensual)"	Nominated	
Premio Lo Nuestro	2019	Song of the Year	"Hoy Tengo Tiempo (Pinta Sensual)"	Nominated	
Premio Lo Nuestro	2020	Tropical Artist Of The Year	Himself	Nominated	
Premio Lo Nuestro	2020	Tropical Collaboration of the Year	"Si Me Das Tu Amor" (with Wisin)	Won	
Premio Lo Nuestro	2020	Tropical Song of the Year	"Si Me Das Tu Amor" (with Wisin)	Nominated	
Premio Lo Nuestro	2020	Single of the Year	"Si Me Das Tu Amor" (with Wisin)	Nominated	
Premio Lo Nuestro	2021	Tropical Artist Of The Year	Himself	Nominated	
Premio Lo Nuestro	2021	Pop Collaboration of the Year	"For Sale" (with Alejandro Sanz)	Nominated	
Premio Lo Nuestro	2021	Video of the Year	"For Sale" (with Alejandro Sanz)	Nominated	
Premio Lo Nuestro	2021	Tropical Collaboration of the Year	"Canción Para Rubén" (with Rubén Blades)	Nominated	
Premio Lo Nuestro	2021	Tropical Song of the Year	"No Te Vayas"	Nominated	
Premio Lo Nuestro	2022	Tropical Artist Of The Year	Himself	Nominated	
Premio Lo Nuestro	2022	Urban Dance/Pop Song of the Year	"El Teke Teke" (with Black Eyed Peas & Play-N-Skillz)	Nominated	
Premio Lo Nuestro	2022	Tropical Collaboration of the Year	"Búscame" (with Kany García)	Nominated	
Premio Lo Nuestro	2022	Tropical Song of the Year	"Canción Bonita" (with Ricky Martin)	Nominated	
Premio Lo Nuestro	2022	The Perfect Mix of the Year	"Canción Bonita" (with Ricky Martin)	Nominated	
Premio Lo Nuestro	2023	Tropical Artist Of The Year	Himself	Nominated	
Premio Lo Nuestro	2023	The Perfect Mix of the Year	"Cumbia del Corazón" (with Los Ángeles Azules)	Nominated	
Premio Lo Nuestro	2023	Urban Dance/Pop Song of the Year	"El Teke Teke" (with Black Eyed Peas & Play-N-Skillz)	Nominated	
Premio Lo Nuestro	2023	Tropical Collaboration of the Year	"Baloncito Viejo" (with Camilo)	Nominated	
Premio Lo Nuestro	2023	Tropical Collaboration of the Year	"El Negrito" (with Gente de Zona)	Nominated	
Premio Lo Nuestro	2023	Album of the Year	Cumbiana II	Nominated	
Premio Lo Nuestro	2023	Tropical Album of the Year	Cumbiana II	Nominated	
Premio Lo Nuestro	2024	Tropical Artist Of The Year	Himself	Nominated	
Premio Lo Nuestro	2024	Tropical Collaboration of the Year	"Las Mujeres" (with Juanes)	Nominated	
Premio Lo Nuestro	2024	Album of the Year	Escalona Nunca Se Había Grabado Así	Nominated	
Premio Lo Nuestro	2024	Tropical Album of the Year	Escalona Nunca Se Había Grabado Así	Nominated	
Premio Lo Nuestro	2025	Tropical Artist Of The Year	Himself	Won	
Premio Lo Nuestro	2025	Pop Song Of The Year	"Santa Marta" (with Luis Fonsi)	Nominated	
Premio Lo Nuestro	2025	Tropical Collaboration Of The Year	"Tú o Yo" (with Silvestre Dangond)	Nominated	
Premios Nuestra Tierra	2009	Album of the Year	Pombo musical	Nominated	
Premios Nuestra Tierra	2009	Best Tropical/Pop Song	"El Modelo Alfabético"	Nominated	
Premios Nuestra Tierra	2010	Producer of the Year	Himself	Nominated	
Premios Nuestra Tierra	2010	Best Vallenato Artist	Himself	Nominated	
Premios Nuestra Tierra	2010	Audicence Favorite Artist	Himself	Nominated	
Premios Nuestra Tierra	2010	Album of the Year	Clásicos de la Provincia Vol. II	Nominated	
Premios Nuestra Tierra	2010	Best Vallenato Song	"Las Mujeres"	Nominated	
Premios Nuestra Tierra	2010	Audicence Favorite Song	"Las Mujeres"	Nominated	
Premios Nuestra Tierra	2013	Artist of the Year	Himself	Won	
Premios Nuestra Tierra	2013	Best Tropical Artist	Himself	Won	
Premios Nuestra Tierra	2013	Audicence Favorite Artist	Himself	Nominated	
Premios Nuestra Tierra	2013	Best Website	carlosvives.com	Won	
Premios Nuestra Tierra	2013	Song of the Year	"Volví a Nacer"	Won	
Premios Nuestra Tierra	2013	Best Video	"Volví a Nacer"	Won	
Premios Nuestra Tierra	2013	Best Tropical Song	"Volví a Nacer"	Won	
Premios Nuestra Tierra	2013	Audicence Favorite Song	"Volví a Nacer"	Nominated	
Premios Nuestra Tierra	2014	Best Song of the Year	"La Foto de los Dos"	Won	
Premios Nuestra Tierra	2014	Best Music Video	"La Foto de los Dos"	Won	
Premios Nuestra Tierra	2014	Best Mainstream Song	"La Foto de los Dos"	Nominated	
Premios Nuestra Tierra	2014	Best Tropical Pop Performance of the Year	"La Foto de los Dos"	Nominated	
Premios Nuestra Tierra	2014	Best Tropical Pop Performance of the Year	"Bailar Contigo"	Nominated	
Premios Nuestra Tierra	2014	Best Tropical Pop Performance of the Year	"Como Le Gusta a Tu Cuerpo"	Nominated	
Premios Nuestra Tierra	2014	Corazón Profundo	Best Album of the Year	Won	
Premios Nuestra Tierra	2014	Best Tropical Pop Artist of the Year	Himself	Won	
Premios Nuestra Tierra	2014	Best Mainstream Artist	Himself	Nominated	
Premios Nuestra Tierra	2014	Best Artist of the Year	Himself	Won	
Premios Nuestra Tierra	2014	Tweeter of the Year	Himself	Nominated	
Premios Nuestra Tierra	2020	Best Tropical Artist	Himself	Nominated	
Premios Nuestra Tierra	2020	Audicence Favorite Artist	Himself	Nominated	
Premios Nuestra Tierra	2020	Best Tropical Song	"Hasta Viejitos" (with Alejandro González)	Nominated	
Premios Nuestra Tierra	2020	Best Folk Song	"Déjame Quererte" (with Cholo Valderrama, Cynthia Montaño, Elkin Robinson, Kombilesa Mí y Velo de Oza)	Won	
Premios Nuestra Tierra	2021	Audicence Favorite Artist	Himself	Nominated	
Premios Nuestra Tierra	2021	Best Folk Artist	Himself	Won	
Premios Nuestra Tierra	2021	Colombian Artist in the World	Himself	Nominated	
Premios Nuestra Tierra	2021	Album of the Year	Cumbiana	Nominated	
Premios Nuestra Tierra	2021	Song of the Year	"Cumbiana"	Nominated	
Premios Nuestra Tierra	2021	Best Folk Song	"Cumbiana"	Won	
Premios Nuestra Tierra	2021	Audience Favorite Song	"Cumbiana"	Nominated	
Premios Nuestra Tierra	2021	Best Tropical / Salsa / Cumbia Song	"Cumbiana"		
Premios Nuestra Tierra	2021	Best Tropical / Salsa / Cumbia Song	"Canción para Rubén" (with Rubén Blades)	Nominated	
Premios Nuestra Tierra	2021	Best Pop Song	"For Sale" (with Alejandro Sanz)	Nominated	
Premios Nuestra Tierra	2021	Best Video	"Cumbiana"	Nominated	
Premios Nuestra Tierra	2022	Best Colombian Worldwile Artist	Himself	Nominated	
Premios Nuestra Tierra	2022	Best Tropical / Salsa / Cumbia Artist	Himself	Nominated	
Premios Nuestra Tierra	2022	Audience Favorite Artist	Himself	Nominated	
Premios Nuestra Tierra	2022	Best Pop Song	"Canción Bonita" (with Ricky Martin)	Nominated	
Premios Nuestra Tierra	2022	Best Popular Song	"Colombia, Mi Encanto"	Won	
Premios Nuestra Tierra	2023	Audicence Favorite Artist	Himself	Nominated	
Premios Nuestra Tierra	2023	Best Folk Artist	Himself	Won	
Premios Nuestra Tierra	2023	Best Tour	Cumbiana Tour	Nominated	
Premios Nuestra Tierra	2023	Album of the Year	Cumbiana II	Nominated	
Premios Nuestra Tierra	2023	Song of the Year	"Baloncito Viejo" (with Camilo)	Nominated	
Premios Nuestra Tierra	2023	Best Video	"Cumbiana"	Won	
Premios Nuestra Tierra	2023	Best Folk Song	"En la Selva" (with Katie James)	Won	
Premios Nuestra Tierra	2023	Best Folk Song	"Patria"	Nominated	
Premios Nuestra Tierra	2023	Best Tropical / Salsa / Cumbia Song	"Cumbia del Corazón" (with. Los Ángeles Azules)	Nominated	
Premios Nuestra Tierra	2023	Best Alternative/Rock Song	"Babel" (with Fito Páez)	Nominated	
Premios Nuestra Tierra	2024	Artist of the Year	Himself	Nominated	
Premios Nuestra Tierra	2024	Best Vallenato Artist	Himself	Nominated	
Premios Nuestra Tierra	2024	Best Tour	Il Tour Dei 30	Nominated	
Premios Nuestra Tierra	2024	Album of the Year	Escalona: Nunca se había grabado así	Nominated	
Premios Nuestra Tierra	2024	Best Vallenato Song	"Las Mujeres" (with Juanes)	Nominated	
World Music Awards	2013	World's Best Album	Corazón Profundo	Nominated	
World Music Awards	2013	World's Best Male Artists	Carlos Vives	Nominated	
World Music Awards	2013	World's Best Live Act	Carlos Vives	Nominated	
