= List of number-one Billboard Latin Pop Airplay songs of 2013 =

The Billboard Latin Pop Airplay is a chart that ranks the best-performing Spanish-language Pop music singles of the United States. Published by Billboard magazine, the data are compiled by Nielsen SoundScan based collectively on each single's weekly airplay.

== Chart history ==
Issue date	Song	Artist	Ref
January 5	"Volví a Nacer"	Carlos Vives	
January 12	"Volví a Nacer"	Carlos Vives	
January 19	"Volví a Nacer"	Carlos Vives	
January 26	"Volví a Nacer"	Carlos Vives	
February 2	"Algo Me Gusta de Ti"	Wisin & Yandel featuring Chris Brown & T-Pain	
February 9	"Algo Me Gusta de Ti"	Wisin & Yandel featuring Chris Brown & T-Pain	
February 16	"Limbo"	Daddy Yankee	
February 23	"Limbo"	Daddy Yankee	
March 2	"Limbo"	Daddy Yankee	
March 9	"Zumba"	Don Omar	
March 16	"Zumba"	Don Omar	
March 23	"Zumba"	Don Omar	
March 30	"Zumba"	Don Omar	
April 6	"Zumba"	Don Omar	
April 13	"Te Me Vas"	Prince Royce	
April 20	"Te Me Vas"	Prince Royce	
April 27	"Limbo"	Daddy Yankee	
May 4	"Limbo"	Daddy Yankee	
May 11	"Te Me Vas"	Prince Royce	
May 18	"Te Me Vas"	Prince Royce	
May 25	"Te Me Vas"	Prince Royce	
June 1	"Limbo"	Daddy Yankee	
June 8	"Limbo"	Daddy Yankee	
June 15	"Te Me Vas"	Prince Royce	
June 22	"Te Me Vas"	Prince Royce	
June 29	"Te Me Vas"	Prince Royce	
July 6	"Vivir Mi Vida"	Marc Anthony	
July 13	"Vivir Mi Vida"	Marc Anthony	
July 20	"Vivir Mi Vida"	Marc Anthony	
July 27	"Vivir Mi Vida"	Marc Anthony	
August 3	"Vivir Mi Vida"	Marc Anthony	
August 10	"Vivir Mi Vida"	Marc Anthony	
August 17	"Vivir Mi Vida"	Marc Anthony	
August 24	"Vivir Mi Vida"	Marc Anthony	
August 31	"Vivir Mi Vida"	Marc Anthony	
September 7	"Vivir Mi Vida"	Marc Anthony	
September 14	"Darte un Beso"	Prince Royce	
September 21	"Darte un Beso"	Prince Royce	
September 28	"Loco"	Enrique Iglesias featuring Romeo Santos	
October 5	"Loco"	Enrique Iglesias featuring Romeo Santos	
October 12	"Loco"	Enrique Iglesias featuring Romeo Santos	
October 19	"Loco"	Enrique Iglesias featuring Romeo Santos	
October 26	"Loco"	Enrique Iglesias featuring Romeo Santos	
November 2	"Loco"	Enrique Iglesias featuring Romeo Santos	
November 9	"Loco"	Enrique Iglesias featuring Romeo Santos	
November 16	"Loco"	Enrique Iglesias featuring Romeo Santos	
November 23	"Loco"	Enrique Iglesias featuring Romeo Santos	
November 30	"Loco"	Enrique Iglesias featuring Romeo Santos	
December 7	"Loco"	Enrique Iglesias featuring Romeo Santos	
December 14	"Loco"	Enrique Iglesias featuring Romeo Santos	
December 21	"Que Viva La Vida"	Wisin	
December 28	"Loco"	Enrique featuring Romeo Santos	
