= List of number-one songs of 2013 (Colombia) =

This is a list of the National-Report Top 100 Nacional number-one songs of 2013. Chart rankings are based on radio play and are issued weekly. The data is compiled monitoring radio stations through an automated system in real-time.

== Number ones by week ==
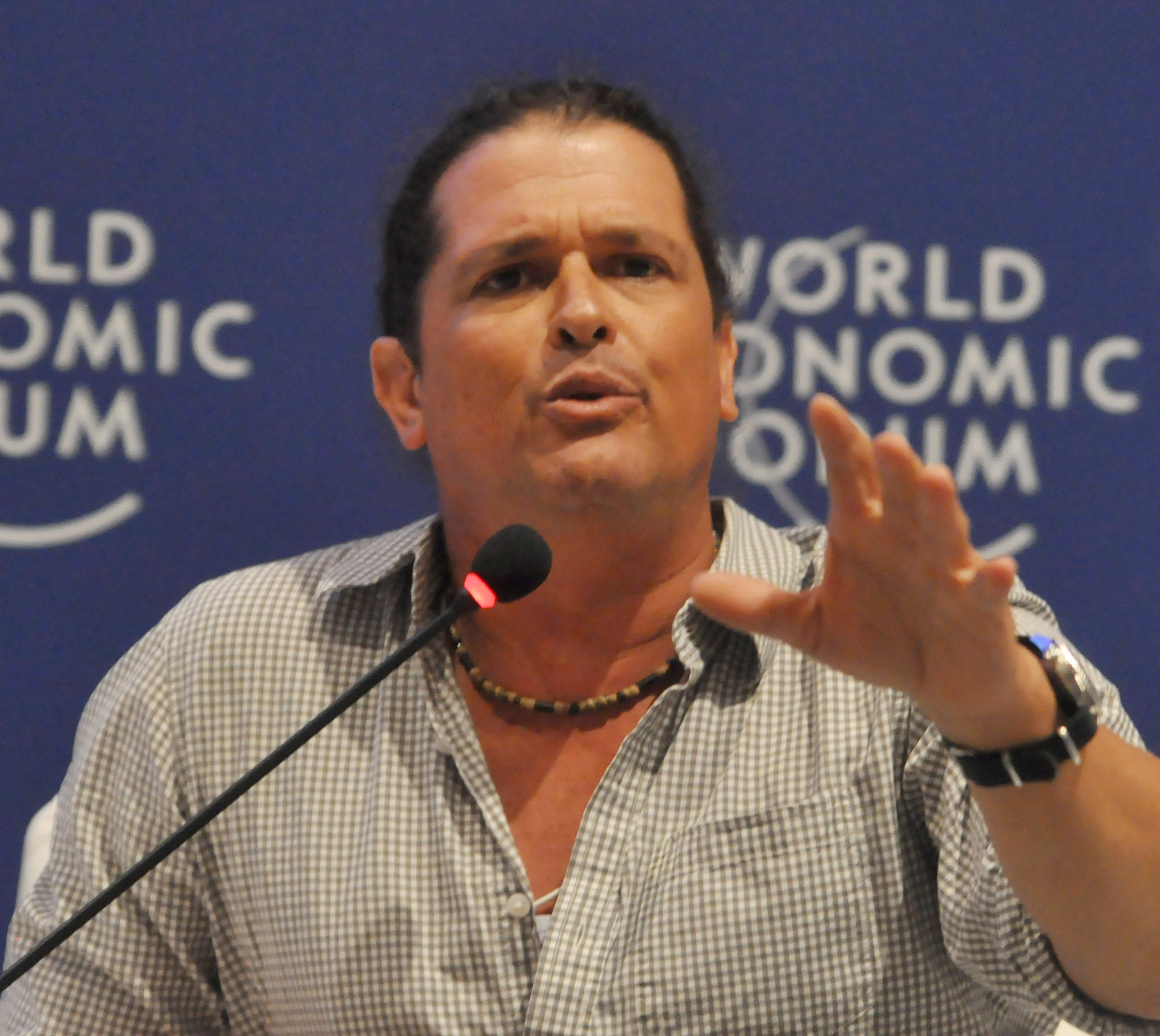
Colombian singer-songwriter Carlos Vives (pictured) had four number-one songs in Colombia in 2013 ("Volví a Nacer", "Como le Gusta a Tu Cuerpo", "Bailar Contigo", and "La Foto de los Dos"). "Como le Gusta Tu Cuerpo" became the longest-running number-one song in the chart.

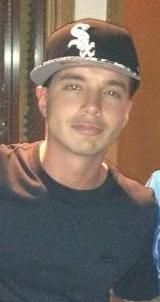
Colombian rapper J Balvin (pictured) reached number-one with his song "Sola".

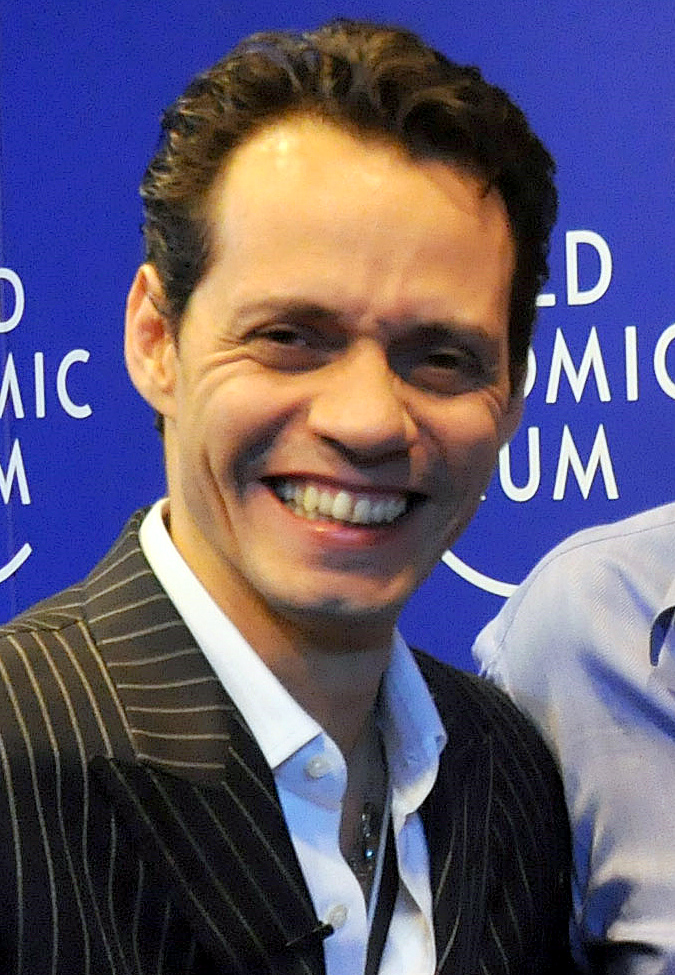
American singer Marc Anthony (pictured) reached number-one with his song "Vivir Mi Vida" which spent a total of eight weeks on top of the chart.

Key
†	Song of the year

Week	Issue date	Song	Artist(s)	Ref.
1	December 31	"Volví a Nacer"	Carlos Vives	
2	January 7	"Volví a Nacer"	Carlos Vives	
3	January 14	"Volví a Nacer"	Carlos Vives	
4	January 21	"Como Le Gusta A Tu Cuerpo"†	Carlos Vives featuring Michel Teló	
5	January 28	"Como Le Gusta A Tu Cuerpo"†	Carlos Vives featuring Michel Teló	
6	February 6	"Como Le Gusta A Tu Cuerpo"†	Carlos Vives featuring Michel Teló	
7	February 11	"Como Le Gusta A Tu Cuerpo"†	Carlos Vives featuring Michel Teló	
8	February 17	"Como Le Gusta A Tu Cuerpo"†	Carlos Vives featuring Michel Teló	
9	February 25	"Como Le Gusta A Tu Cuerpo"†	Carlos Vives featuring Michel Teló	
10	March 4	"Como Le Gusta A Tu Cuerpo"†	Carlos Vives featuring Michel Teló	
11	March 11	"Como Le Gusta A Tu Cuerpo"†	Carlos Vives featuring Michel Teló	
12	March 18	"Como Le Gusta A Tu Cuerpo"†	Carlos Vives featuring Michel Teló	
13	March 25	"Como Le Gusta A Tu Cuerpo"†	Carlos Vives featuring Michel Teló	
14	April 1	"Como Le Gusta A Tu Cuerpo"†	Carlos Vives featuring Michel Teló	
15	April 8	"Como Le Gusta A Tu Cuerpo"†	Carlos Vives featuring Michel Teló	
16	April 15	"Como Le Gusta A Tu Cuerpo"†	Carlos Vives featuring Michel Teló	
17	April 22	"Un Beso"	Lui G21+	
18	April 29	"Un Beso"	Lui G21+	
19	May 6	"Un Beso"	Lui G21+	
20	May 13	"Un Beso"	Lui G21+	
21	May 20	"Bailar Contigo"	Carlos Vives	
22	May 27	"Bailar Contigo"	Carlos Vives	
23	June 3	"Bailar Contigo"	Carlos Vives	
24	June 10	"Bailar Contigo"	Carlos Vives	
25	June 17	"Bailar Contigo"	Carlos Vives	
26	June 24	"Bailar Contigo"	Carlos Vives	
27	July 1	"Bailar Contigo"	Carlos Vives	
28	July 8	"Sola"	J Balvin	
29	July 15	"Sola"	J Balvin	
30	July 22	"Bailar Contigo"	Carlos Vives	
31	July 29	"Bailar Contigo"	Carlos Vives	
32	August 5	"Bailar Contigo"	Carlos Vives	
33	August 12	"Vivir Mi Vida"	Marc Anthony	
34	August 19	"Vivir Mi Vida"	Marc Anthony	
35	August 26	"Vivir Mi Vida"	Marc Anthony	
36	September 2	"Vivir Mi Vida"	Marc Anthony	
37	September 9	"Vivir Mi Vida"	Marc Anthony	
38	September 16	"Vivir Mi Vida"	Marc Anthony	
39	September 23	"Vivir Mi Vida"	Marc Anthony	
40	September 30	"Espina de Rosa"	Andy Rivera featuring Dalmata	
41	October 7	"Vivir Mi Vida"	Marc Anthony	
42	October 14	"La Foto de los Dos"	Carlos Vives	
43	October 21	"La Foto de los Dos"	Carlos Vives	
44	October 28	"La Foto de los Dos"	Carlos Vives	
45	November 4	"La Foto de los Dos"	Carlos Vives	
46	November 11	"La Foto de los Dos"	Carlos Vives	
47	November 18	"La Foto de los Dos"	Carlos Vives	
48	November 25	"La Foto de los Dos"	Carlos Vives	
49	December 2	"La Foto de los Dos"	Carlos Vives	
50	December 9	"Amor a Primera Vista"	Alkilados	
51	December 16	"La Foto de los Dos"	Carlos Vives	
