= 14th Annual Latin Grammy Awards =

Music awards presented Nov 2013

14th Latin Grammy Awards
- Date: November 21, 2013
- Venue: Mandalay Bay Events Center, Paradise, Nevada
- Hosted by: Blanca Soto, Omar Chaparro & Lucero

Highlights
- Person of the Year: Miguel Bosé

Television/radio coverage
- Network: Univision

The 14th Annual Latin Grammy Awards was held on Thursday, November 21, 2013, at the Mandalay Bay Events Center in Las Vegas. This was the sixth time that Latin Grammys has been held at this location. The main telecast was broadcast on Univision at 8:00 PM EST.

The nominations were announced on September 25, 2013. Javier Garza, Illya Kuryaki and the Valderramas and Carlos Vives led the nominations with five nods each. Miguel Bosé was honored as the Latin Recording Academy Person of the Year on November 20, the day prior to the Latin Grammy Awards.

Carlos Vives was the biggest winner with three awards, including Song of the Year for "Volví a Nacer"; Marc Anthony won Record of the Year for "Vivir Mi Vida"; Draco Rosa won the award for Album of the Year for Vida; and Gaby Moreno was awarded Best New Artist. This marks the first time since the inaugural awards that the three categories were given to three different artists. Producer Sergio George won three awards, including Producer of the Year.

== Awards ==
The following is a list of nominees:

=== General ===
Record of the Year

Marc Anthony — "Vivir Mi Vida"

- Pablo Alborán — "Tanto"
- Concha Buika — "La Nave del Olvido"
- Andrés Cepeda — "Lo Mejor Que Hay En Mi Vida"
- Natalie Cole featuring Juan Luis Guerra — "Bachata Rosa"
- Santiago Cruz — "Desde Lejos"
- Draco Rosa featuring Ricky Martin — "Más y Más"
- Alejandro Sanz — "Mi Marciana"
- Caetano Veloso — "Um Abraçaço"
- Carlos Vives — "Volví a Nacer"

Album of the Year

Draco Rosa — Vida

- Pablo Alborán — Tanto
- Bajofondo — Presente
- Miguel Bosé — Papitwo
- Andrés Cepeda — Lo Mejor Que Hay En Mi Vida
- Natalie Cole — Natalie Cole en Español
- Guaco — Escultura
- Gian Marco — Versiones
- Alejandro Sanz — La Música No Se Toca
- Carlos Vives — Corazón Profundo

Song of the Year

Andrés Castro and Carlos Vives — "Volví a Nacer"

- Roberto Carlos — "Esse Cara Sou Eu"
- José Luis Pardo — "La Que Me Gusta" (Los Amigos Invisibles)
- Mario Domm, Hanna Huerta & Jesse & Joy — "Llorar"
- Amaury Gutiérrez — "Lo Mejor Que Hay En Mi Vida" (Andrés Cepeda)
- Alejandro Sanz — "Mi Marciana"
- Ricardo Arjona — "Mi Novia Se Me Está Poniendo Vieja"
- Jorge Luis Piloto — "Si Yo Fuera Tú" (Gilberto Santa Rosa)
- Aleks Syntek — "Sólo El Amor Nos Salvará" (Aleks Syntek Featuring Malú)
- Caetano Veloso — "Um Abraçaço"

Best New Artist

Gaby Moreno

- A Band of Bitches
- Leslie Cartaya
- EliaCim
- Clarice Falcão
- Jesús Hidalgo
- Maluma
- Mojito Lite
- Quattro
- Milton Salcedo

=== Pop ===
Best Contemporary Pop Vocal Album

Alejandro Sanz — La Música No Se Toca

- Miguel Bosé — Papitwo
- Draco Rosa — Vida
- Aleks Syntek — Syntek
- Julieta Venegas — Los Momentos

Best Traditional Pop Vocal Album

Andrés Cepeda — Lo Mejor Que Hay En Mi Vida

- Pablo Alborán — Tanto
- Natalie Cole — Natalie Cole en Español
- India Martínez — Otras Verdades
- Ricardo Montaner — Viajero Frecuente

=== Urban ===
Best Urban Performance

Pitbull featuring Papayo — "Echa Pa'lla (Manos Pa'rriba)"

- Alexis & Fido — "Rompe la Cintura"
- Elvis Crespo featuring Fito Blanko — "Pegaíto Suavecito"
- Illya Kuryaki and the Valderramas — "Amor"
- Mala Rodríguez — "Quien Manda"

Best Urban Music Album

Mala Rodríguez — Bruja

- Daddy Yankee — Prestige
- Ivy Queen — Musa
- Tito El Bambino — Invicto
- Wisin & Yandel — Líderes

Best Urban Song

Illya Kuryaki and the Valderramas — "Ula Ula"

- Dj Buddah, Papayo, Pitbull, Gregor Salto & Tzvetin Todorov, Pitbull — "Echa Pa'lla (Manos Pa'rriba)"
- Daddy Yankee, Eliezer Palacios, Giancarlo Rivera, Jonathan Rivera and Francisco Saldaña — "Limbo"
- Clément Dumoulin and Mala Rodríguez — "Quien Manda"
- Jorge Drexler, Andrés Mujica Celis and Ana Tijoux — "Sacar la Voz"

=== Rock ===
Best Rock Album

La Vida Bohème — Será

- Eruca Sativa — Blanco
- Los Bunkers — La Velocidad de la Luz
- No Te Va Gustar — El Calor del Pleno Invierno
- Ska-P — 99%

Best Pop/Rock Album

Beto Cuevas — Transformación

- Black Guayaba — La Conexión
- DLD — Primario
- Tan Biónica — Destinología
- Tren A Marte — Tercera Llamada
- Vicentico — Vicentico 5

Best Rock Song

Cachorro López and Vicentico — "Creo Que Me Enamoré"

- Emiliano Brancciari — "A las Nueve" (No Te Va Gustar)
- Erik Canales — "16" (Allison)
- Henry D'Arthenay — "Hornos de Cal" (La Vida Bohème)
- DLD — "Todo Cuenta"

=== Alternative ===
Best Alternative Music Album

Natalia Lafourcade — Mujer Divina – Homenaje a Agustín Lara

- Bomba Estéreo — Elegancia Tropical
- Café Tacuba — El Objeto Antes Llamado Disco
- Illya Kuryaki and the Valderramas — Chances
- Leon Larregui — Solstis

Best Alternative Song

Bajofondo — "Pena En Mi Corazón"

- Leon Larregui — "Brillas"
- Hello Seahorse! — "La Flotadera"
- Illya Kuryaki and the Valderramas — "Monta El Trueno"
- Sig Ragga — "Pensando"

=== Tropical ===
Best Salsa Album

Various Artists — Sergio George Presents: Salsa Giants

- Albita — Una Mujer Que Canta
- Guayacán — 25 Años, 25 Éxitos, 25 Artistas
- Víctor Manuelle — Me Llamaré Tuyo
- Tito Nieves — Que Seas Feliz
- Gilberto Santa Rosa — Gilberto Santa Rosa

Best Cumbia/Vallenato Album

Felipe Peláez and Manuel Julián — Differente

- Daniel Calderón y Los Gigantes — El Show Máximo Nivel
- Silvestre Dangond — La 9a Batalla
- Kvrass — Irreverente
- Jorge Oñate — El Chaco de La Película

Best Contemporary Tropical Album

Juan Luis Guerra — Asondeguerra Tour

- Leslie Grace — Leslie Grace
- Guaco — Escultura
- Toby Love — Amor Total
- Vocal Song — Amarle

Best Traditional Tropical Album

Arturo Sandoval — Un Siglo De Pasión

- Lucy Fabery and Humberto Ramírez — Sentimentales
- Miriam Ramos with Barbarito Torres, Ernán Lopez-Nussa and Rolando Luna — La Canción Cubana
- Septeto Nacional Ignacio Piñeiro — La Habana Tiene Su Son
- Septeto Santiaguero — Vamos Pa' La Fiesta

Best Tropical Fusion Album

Carlos Vives — Corazón Profundo

- Casadiego — Obsesiónate
- Grupo Treo — Pégate
- Palmacoco — Boogaflow
- Tecupae — Suerte

Best Tropical Song

Andrés Castro and Carlos Vives — "Volví a Nacer"

- Yoel Henríquez and Amerika Jiménez — "No Soy Un Hombre Malo" (Héctor Acosta "El Torito")
- Sergio George and Jorge Luis Piloto — "Para Celebrar" (Various Artists)
- Jorge Luis Piloto — "Si Yo Fuera Tú" (Gilberto Santa Rosa)
- Víctor Víctor — "Y Yo Dejándola"

=== Singer-songwriter ===
Best Singer-Songwriter Album

Caetano Veloso — Abraçaço

- Andrea Echeverri — Ruiseñora
- Kany García — Kany García
- Tommy Torres — 12 Historias
- Yordano — Sueños Clandestinos

=== Regional Mexican ===
Best Ranchero Album

Vicente Fernández — Hoy

- Vikki Carr — Viva la Vida
- Aida Cuevas — Totalmente Juan Gabriel
- Mariachi Sol de México de José Hernández con La Sinfónica de Las Américas — La Música
- Sheyla Tadeo — Amémonos Homenaje A Lucha Villa

Best Banda Album

Banda Los Recoditos — El Free
La Original Banda El Limón de Salvador Lizárraga — La Original y Sus Boleros de Amor

- Banda Carnaval — Las Vueltas de La Vida
- Cuisillos de Arturo Macias — 2012 Fin y Principio de Una Era
- El Dasa — Pá La Raza
- La Adictiva Banda de San José Mesillas — Muchas Gracias

Best Tejano Album

David Lee Garza — Just Friends

- Shaggy García y Grupo Recuerdo — Solo Tencha
- Los Texmaniacs — Texas Towns & Tex-Mex Sounds
- Jay Perez — New Horizons
- Siggno — El Mundo Se Acabó

Best Norteño Album

Intocable — En Peligro de Extinción

- Los Canarios De Michoacán — Hoy y Siempre
- Emilio Navaira — A Las Personas de Mi Vida
- Pesado — Mi Promesa
- Voz de Mando — Y Ahora Resulta

Best Regional Song

Pedro Fernández — "Cachito de Cielo"

- Horacio Palencia — "Mi Razón De Ser" (Banda Sinaloense Ms de Sergio Lizárraga)
- Manuel Eduardo Toscano — "Romeo Y Su Nieta" (Paquita la del Barrio)
- Luis Carlos Monroy, Adrián Pieragostino and Alex Rodríguez — "Todo y Nada" (Los Canarios de Michoacán)
- Adalberto Gallegos — "Tu Última Canción" (Jay Perez)

=== Instrumental ===
Best Instrumental Album

Bajofondo — Presente

- Huáscar Barradas and Leopoldo Betancourt — Dos Mundos 2
- Hamilton de Holanda — Trio
- Paquito D'Rivera and Sérgio Assad & Odair Assad — Dances From The New World
- Theodore Kuchar conducting The Orquesta Sinfónica de Venezuela — Latin American Classics

=== Traditional ===
Best Folk Album

Reynaldo Armas — El Caballo de Oro

- Gaêlica — Luz - Una Navidad Celta En Venezuela
- Gualberto Ibarreto and C4 Trío — Gualberto + C4
- Los Nocheros — Clásicos - El Pecado Original
- María Mulata — De Cantos Y Vuelos
- Chuchito Valdés and Eddy Navia — Carnaval En Piano Charango

Best Tango Album

Diego El Cigala — Romance de la Luna Tucumana

- Julio Botti — Tango Nostalgias
- Hernán Lucero — Tangos y Canciones Criollas
- Ramírez-Satorre — Piazzolla de Cámara
- Pablo Ziegler and Metropole Orkest — Amsterdam Meets New Tango

Best Flamenco Album

Tomatito — Soy Flamenco

- Vicente Amigo — Tierra
- Argentina — Un Viaje Por El Cante
- José Mercé — Mi Única Llave
- Estrella Morente — Autorretrato
- Miguel Poveda — Real

=== Jazz ===
Best Latin Jazz Album

Michel Camilo — What's Up?

- The Clare Fischer Latin Jazz Big Band — ¡Ritmo!
- Negroni's Trio — On the Way
- Poncho Sanchez and His Latin Jazz Band — Live in Hollywood
- Chucho Valdés and the Afro-Cuban Messengers — Border-Free
- Chucho Valdés — Grand Piano Live

=== Christian ===
Best Spanish Christian Album

Alex Campos — Regreso A Ti

- Daniel Calveti — Mi Refugio
- Lilly Goodman — Amor Favor Gracia
- Mónica — Encontré Su Amor
- Marcos Vidal — Tu Nombre

Best Portuguese Christian Album

Kleber Lucas — Profeta Da Esperança

- Eyshila — Jesus, O Brasil Te Adora
- Anderson Freire — Raridade
- Bruna Karla — Aceito O Teu Chamado
- Padre Reginaldo Manzotti — Paz e Luz
- Ministério Adoração e Vida — Herói

=== Brazilian ===
Best Brazilian Contemporary Pop Album

Seu Jorge — Músicas Para Churrasco Vol. 1 Ao Vivo

- Ed Motta — Aor
- Natiruts — Acústico
- Adryana Ribeiro — Take It Easy My Brother Jorge
- Skank — Ao Vivo: Rock in Rio
- Ultraleve — Ultraleve

Best Brazilian Rock Album

Jota Quest — Ao Vivo: Rock in Rio

- Nevilton — Sacode!
- Nando Reis and Os Infernais — Sei
- Vespas Mandarinas — Animal Nacional
- Vowe — Nossa Verdade

Best Samba/Pagode Album

Alexandre Pires — Eletrosamba - Ao Vivo

- Diogo Nogueira — Ao Vivo em Cuba
- Zeca Pagodinho — Vida Que Segue
- Various Artists — Sambabook Martinho da Vila 2
- Dora Vergueiro — Dora Vergueiro

Best MPB Album

Maria Rita — Redescobrir - Ao Vivo

- Gilberto Gil — Concerto de Cordas & Máquinas de Ritmo
- Edu Lobo — Edu Lobo & Metropole Orkest
- Various Artists — Herivelto Martins - 100 Anos
- Jorge Vercillo — Luar de Sol - Ao Vivo no Ceará

Best Sertaneja Music Album

Victor & Leo — Ao Vivo em Floripa

- João Bosco & Vinícius — A Festa
- Jorge & Mateus — A Hora é Agora - Ao Vivo em Jurerê
- Marcos & Belutti — Cores
- Michel Teló — Sunset

Best Brazilian Roots Album

Various Artists — Salve Gonzagão 100 Anos

- César Oliveira & Rogério Melo — Era Assim Naquele Tempo...!
- Os Serranos — Os Serranos Interpretam Sucessos Gaúchos Vol. 3
- Elba Ramalho — Vambora Lá Dançar
- Various Artists — Sob o Olhar Januarense / O Velho Chico - Volume 1

Best Brazilian Song

Roberto Carlos — "Esse Cara Sou Eu"

- Djavan — "Bangalô"
- Gilberto Gil — "Eu Descobri"
- Biquini Cavadão & Dudy — "Roda-Gigante"
- Caetano Veloso — "Um Abraçaço"
- Arlindo Cruz, Gegê d'Angola and Julinho Santos — "Vai Embora Tristeza"
- Joelson Castro and Felipe Salles — "Vem Me Completar" (Bruna & Keyla)

=== Children's ===
Best Latin Children's Album

Lucky Díaz y La Familia Música — ¡Fantástico!

- Atención Atención — Vamos A Bailar
- Eslabones Kids — Vamos A Cantar
- Karito — Estoy Feliz
- Miami Lighthouse for the Blind — Four Magical Stories to Live

=== Classical ===
Best Classical Album

Nelson Freire — Brasileiro

- José Serebrier and St. Michel Strings — Adagio
- Elaine Ortiz Arándes, Rafael Dávila, Manolo González, Guido Lebrón, Ilca López and Gil René - Cofresí: Rafael Hernández
- José Serebrier — Dvorák Symphonies 3 & 6
- Mario Adnet — Um Olhar Sobre Villa-Lobos
- Isaac Karabtchevsky — Heitor Villa-Lobos Symphony No. 6 'On the Outline of the Mountains of Brazil'; Symphony No. 7

Best Classical Contemporary Composition

Carlos Franzetti — "Zingaros"

- Anderson Freire — "A Igreja Vem"
- Rafael Piccolotto de Lima — "Abertura Jobiniana" (Jeremy Fox conducting the Orquesta Sinfónica Nacional de Costa Rica)
- Gabriela Ortiz — "Elegía" (Southwest Chamber Music)
- Leo Brouwer — "String Quartet # 5" (The Havana String Quartet)

=== Recording Package ===
Best Recording Package

Tonho Quinta-Feira and Fernando Young — Abraçaço (Caetano Veloso)

- Filipe Costa and Mateus Sá — Abaporu (Laura Lopes)
- Belén Mena — De Taitas y de Mamas (Various Artists)
- The Welcome Branding Group — El Techo es el Suelo (Quiero Club)
- Masa — Repeat After Me (Los Amigos Invisibles)

=== Production ===
Best Engineered Album

Edgar Barrera, Sebastian de Peyrecave, Javier Garza, Julio Reyes Copello and Mike Fuller — Kany García (Kany García)

- Eduardo Sobral, Léo Guimarães, Roberto Jr., Luiz Carlos T Reis and Ricardo Dias — Barra Da Saia (Karyme Hass)
- Carlos Campón, Ernesto García, Noah Georgeson, Demian Nava, Sebastían Schon, César Sogbe and José Blanco — Mujer Divina – Homenaje a Agustín Lara (Natalia Lafourcade)
- Marcelo Sabóia and Carlos Freitas — Rua Dos Amores (Djavan)
- Bori Alarcón, Sergio Delgado and Salomé Limón — Soy Flamenco (Tomatito)

Producer of the Year

Sergio George

- Rafael Arcaute
- Javier Limón
- Julio Reyes Copello
- Dan Warner

=== Music video ===
Best Short Form Music Video

Alex Cuba — "Eres Tú"

- Famasloop — "Más Cerquita"
- Jotdog — "Corazón de Metal"
- Illya Kuryaki and the Valderramas — "Ula Ula"
- Leiva — "Vis A Vis"

Best Long Form Music Video

Natalia Lafourcade — Mujer Divina – Homenaje a Agustín Lara

- Cartel de Santa — Me Atizo Macizo Tour
- Fuerzabruta — Wayra Tour
- Fito Páez — El Amor Después del Amor: 20 Años
- Various Artists — Hecho Con Sabor a Puerto Rico

== Special Merit Awards ==
The following is a list of special merit awards

Lifetime Achievement Awards

- Oscar D'León
- Juan Formell
- Roberto Menescal
- Totó La Momposina
- Palito Ortega
- Eddie Palmieri
- Miguel Ríos

Trustees Award

- Mario Kreutzberger "Don Francisco"
- Pedro Ramírez Velázquez

== Changes to award categories ==
A new category for Best Urban Performance was added to the Urban music field. The award is intended for commercially released singles or tracks of a newly recorded material within the urban music genre.

== Performers ==
- Intro — "Latin Grammy 2013"
- Wisin — "Que Viva La Vida"
- Jesse & Joy and Mario Domm — "Llorar"
- Carlos Vives — "Volví a Nacer"
- Leslie Grace featuring Zarkana by Cirque du Soleil — "Be My Baby"
- Alejandro Sanz with Berklee College of Music Students — "La Musica No Se Toca"
- Enrique Iglesias, India Martínez and Descemer Bueno — "Loco"
- Draco Rosa and Ricky Martin — "Más y Más"
- Pablo Alborán — "Tanto"
- El Dasa — "Casi Perfecto"
- Becky G and Maluma — "La Temperatura"
- Paquita la del Barrio with Mariachi Sol de México de José Hernández — "Romeo y Su Nieta"
- Marc Anthony — "Vivir Mi Vida"
- Pitbull, El Cata and Enrique Iglesias — "Echa Pa'lla (Manos Pa'rriba) / Cotorra y Voli / I Like It"
- Miguel Bosé with Laura Pausini / Juanes / Ricky Martin — "Te Amare / Nada Particular / Bambu / "Bandido"
- Natalia Lafourcade — "Maria Bonita"
- Gian Marco — "La flor de la canela"
- Yandel — "Hasta Abajo"
- Wisin & Yandel — "Algo Me Gusta de Ti"
- Natalie Cole (and Nat King Cole in video footage) — "Acercate Mas"
- Calibre 50 and Banda Carnaval — "Gente Batallosa"
- Salsa Giants (Sergio George, Oscar D'León, Ismael Miranda, Willy Chirino, Tito Nieves, José Alberto "El Canario") — "Para Celebrar"

== Presenters ==
- Iván Sánchez and Roselyn Sánchez — presented Best Contemporary Pop Vocal Album
- Gaby Moreno — presented Best Urban Performance
- Luis Angel Franco, Génesis Rodríguez and Samuel Sarmiento — presented Best Tropical Fusion Album
- Laura Pausini — presented Best New Artist
- Ximena Navarrete and David Zepeda — presented Best Urban Song
- Julieta Venegas and Alex Cuba — presented Song of the Year
- Gabriela Isler and Illya Kuryaki and the Valderramas — presented Best Salsa Album
- Mala Rodríguez and Syntek — presented Best Norteño Album
- Carlos Santana and Juanes — presented Album of the Year
- Ninel Conde — introduced Yandel
- Don Francisco and Cote de Pablo — presented Record of the Year
