= Corazón Profundo =

Studio album by Carlos Vives
- Released: April 23, 2013
- Recorded: Henson Recording Studios, Los Angeles & On the Groove Studio, Miami; Audiovision Estudios, Bogotá; Le Dune Studios, Bologna, Italy
- Genres: Latin pop, vallenato, champeta, cumbia, rock en español, tropipop
- Length: 42:02
- Label: Sony Music Latin
- Producers: Carlos Vives; Andrés Castro

Carlos Vives chronology
| Clásicos de la Provincia II (2009) | Corazón Profundo (2013) | Más + Corazón Profundo (2014) |

Singles from Corazón Profundo
- 1. "Volví a Nacer" Released: September 24, 2012; 2. "Como Le Gusta A Tu Cuerpo" Released: January 22, 2013; 3. "Bailar Contigo" Released: May 5, 2013; 4. "La Foto de los Dos" Released: October 4, 2013

Corazón Profundo (transl. Deep Heart) is the thirteenth studio album by Colombian recording artist Carlos Vives, released by Sony Music on April 23, 2013. This was Vives's first studio album since 2009's Clásicos de la Provincia II and the first to feature all-new material since 2004's El Rock de Mi Pueblo. It was also the first album he released with Sony Music since Escalona: Vol. 2 (1992).

The album's first single, "Volví a Nacer" was released on September 24, 2012. It peaked at #1 on the Colombian National-Report, US Billboard Latin Pop Songs and US Billboard Hot Latin Songs charts. The second single, "Como Le Gusta A Tu Cuerpo", featuring the Brazilian musician Michel Teló, was released on January 22, 2013 and peaked at #3 in the US Billboard Hot Latin Songs chart. The third single from the album, "Bailar Contigo", was released on May 5, 2013.

== Promotion ==
=== Singles ===
"Volví a Nacer" was released as the lead single of the album. The single debuted at the top of the Billboard Hot Latin Songs chart dated on the week of October 4, 2012 thanks to heavy airplay, giving Carlos Vives his fifth number one single on the chart. The same week the song peaked at number one in Colombia, Mexico and Venezuela.

"Como Le Gusta A Tu Cuerpo" was released as the second single on January 22, 2013 and featured the Brazilian artist Michel Teló.

"Bailar Contigo" was released to Colombian radio stations on May 5, 2013.

"La Foto de los Dos" was released in October 2013.

=== Como Le Gusta a Mi Pueblo Tour ===
Como Le Gusta a Mi Pueblo Tour
- Tour by Carlos Vives
- Associated album: Corazón Profundo
- Start date: July 6, 2013
- End date: July 28, 2013
- No. of shows: 9

Como Le Gusta a Mi Pueblo Tour is the concert tour by Vives in support of his thirteenth studio album Corazón Profundo. The tour started in Puerto Rico and continued in many US cities.

Tour dates
| Date | City | Country | Venue |
|---|---|---|---|
| July 6, 2013 | San Juan | United States | José Miguel Agrelot Coliseum |
| July 12, 2013 | Orlando | United States | Amway Center |
| July 13, 2013 | Miami | United States | American Airlines Arena |
| July 17, 2013 | Atlanta | United States | Gwinnett Center |
| July 19, 2013 | Boston | United States | Agganis Arena |
| July 20, 2013 | Newark | United States | Prudential Center |
| July 24, 2013 | Washington, D.C. | United States | Patriot Center |
| July 27, 2013 | Los Angeles | United States | Nokia Theatre L.A. Live |
| July 28, 2013 | Houston | United States | Toyota Center |

== Reception ==
=== Critical response ===
Professional ratings
Review scores
| Source | Rating |
|---|---|
| About.com | 3/5 stars |
| Allmusic | 3.5/5 stars |

Corazón Profundo has received generally positive reviews from critics. At About.com's Carlos Quintana opined that "I have to say the album has left me with mixed feelings. While I like the romantic vibes in this album and the more traditional sound of tracks like 'Hoy Me Desperte en Otro Lugar', I really did not enjoy some of the commercial stuff that Carlos Vives added here". David Jeffries from Allmusic gave the album three and a half stars (out of five), saying to "expect nostalgic numbers and romantic songs, along with some modern, polished pop" and highlighting the new sound with the song "Como Le Gusta a Tu Cuerpo" and the smash hit "Volvi a Nacer".

=== Commercial performance ===
Corazón Profundo debuted at number one on the National-Report album chart in Colombia with first-day sales of 35,000 copies. In its first week the album had sold more than 200,000 copies and was certified diamond. In the United States, the album debuted at number 61 on the Billboard 200 and at number one on the Latin Albums chart, spending two weeks there. In Venezuela the album sold 5,000 copies on the day of its release and was certified gold by the APFV. The album debuted at #10 in Spain, at #43 in Mexico and at #2 in Argentina.

== Track listing ==
All lyrics are written by Carlos Vives; all music is composed by Carlos Vives and Andrés Castro except where noted.

| No. | Title | Writer(s) | Length |
|---|---|---|---|
| 1. | "Volví a Nacer" | | 3:42 |
| 2. | "Como Le Gusta a Tu Cuerpo" (featuring Michel Teló) | | 3:50 |
| 3. | "Bailar Contigo" | | 4:12 |
| 4. | "Corazón Profundo" | | 4:01 |
| 5. | "Amanecer" | | 3:23 |
| 6. | "Salvar Tu Amor" | | 3:23 |
| 7. | "Hoy Me Desperté En Otro Lugar" | Vives | 3:57 |
| 8. | "La Foto de los Dos" | | 4:07 |
| 9. | "Entonces Pa' Qué Estoy Yo" | | 3:39 |
| 10. | "La Fantástica" | | 3:54 |
| 11. | "La Perla" | Vives, Castro, Juan Deluque | 3:54 |
| Total length: | | | 42:02 |

Deluxe Version

| No. | Title | Length |
|---|---|---|
| 12. | "Déjalo Pasar" | 3:09 |
| 13. | "Volví a Nacer (Versión Original)" | 4:01 |
| 14. | "Como Le Gusta a Tu Cuerpo (A&X Dance Remix)" | 3:24 |
| 15. | "Bailar Contigo (Versión 2)" | 4:07 |
| 16. | "Volví a Nacer (Versión Balada)" | 4:29 |

== Personnel ==
- Carlos Vives – lead and backing vocals
- Ramón Benítez – euphonium
- Pablo Bernal – drums
- Andrés Castro – guitars, keyboards
- Egidio Cuadrado – accordion
- Juan Deluque – backing vocals
- Guianko Gómez – backing vocals
- Dany Henao – backing vocals
- John Lozano – accordion
- Carlos Iván Medina – keyboards
- Mayte Montero – gaita, percussion
- Luis Angel "El Papa" Pastor – bass
- Eder Polo – guacharaca
- Alfredo Rosado – snare drum
- Rodny Terán – percussion
- Robert Vilera – percussion
- Pete Wallace – keyboards
- Violins – Aldo Cappicchoni, Enrico Gramigna, Gioele Sindon, Francesca Cuadrelli, Claudio Castagnoli, Nicoletta Bassetti
- Violas – Aldo Maria Zangheri, Manuela Tromboni
- Cellos – Cecilia Biondini, Cecilia Amadori
- Michel Teló – accordion on "Como Le Gusta a Tu Cuerpo"
- Dan Warner – guitar solo on "Hoy Me Desperté"

=== Production ===
- Arranged by Andrés Castro and Carlos Vives except "Como Le Gusta a Tu Cuerpo" arranged by Andrés Castro, Carlos Vives, Dudu Borges and Michel Teló
- Produced by Andrés Castro and Carlos Vives

== Charts ==
=== Weekly charts ===
| Chart (2013) | Peak position |
|---|---|
| Argentine Albums (CAPIF) | 2 |
| Colombian Albums (ASINCOL) | 1 |
| Mexican Albums (Top 100 Mexico) | 42 |
| Spanish Albums (Promusicae) | 10 |
| US Billboard 200 | 61 |
| US Top Latin Albums (Billboard) | 1 |
| US Latin Pop Albums (Billboard) | 1 |
| Venezuelan Albums (APFV) | 1 |

=== Year-end charts ===
| Chart (2013) | Position |
|---|---|
| Argentinian Albums (CAPIF) | 81 |
| US Top Latin Albums | 13 |
| US Latin Pop Albums | 6 |
| Chart (2014) | Position |
| US Top Latin Albums | 50 |
| US Latin Pop Albums | 9 |

== Certifications ==
| Region | Certification | Certified units/sales |
|---|---|---|
| Colombia (ASINCOL) | 2× Diamond | 200,000^{x} |
| United States (RIAA) | Platinum (Latin) | 60,000^{‡} |
| Venezuela (APFV) | Gold | 10,000^{x} |
^{‡} Sales+streaming figures based on certification alone.

== See also ==
- List of number-one Billboard Latin Albums from the 2010s
- List of number-one Billboard Latin Pop Albums from the 2010s

== Release history ==
| Region | Date | Format(s) | Label |
|---|---|---|---|
| Colombia | April 21, 2013 | CD | Sony Music Latin |
| Colombia | April 22, 2013 | Digital download | Sony Music Latin |
| United States | April 23, 2013 | CD, digital download | Sony Music Latin |
