= Sergio George Presents: Salsa Giants =

Live album by Various artists
- Released: 24 June 2013
- Recorded: 31 August 2012
- Venues: Curaçao North Sea Jazz Festival, World Trade Center (Willemstad, Curaçao)
- Genres: Salsa; tropical
- Length: 77:18
- Languages: Spanish; English
- Labels: Top Stop; Sony Latin
- Producer: Sergio George

Singles from Sergio George Presents: Salsa Giants
- 1. "Para Celebrar" Released: 4 June 2013

Sergio George Presents: Salsa Giants is a live album by various artists and American pianist and record producer Sergio George. It was released on 24 June 2013 through Top Stop Music and Sony Music Latin. It has the participation of artists with whom George recorded and produced albums in the past such as Tito Nieves, Marc Anthony, Oscar D'León, Luis Enrique, and Orquesta de la Luz among others.

The live album featured great hits from the singers recorded live at the Curaçao North Sea Jazz Festival on 31 August 2012. Such hits were "Valió la Pena", "Yo No Sé Mañana", "Fabricando Fantasías", "Un Disco Más", "Mi Bajo y Yo, "Anacaona", "Casi Te Envidio", "Aguanilé", "Medias Negras", "Tu Amor Me Hace Bien" among others.

In 2014, George released an EP with the same name which contained the single "Para Celebrar". At the 14th Annual Latin Grammy Awards the album was the winner of the Latin Grammy Award for Best Salsa Album in November 2013.

== Background ==
The project was born as a hope to rescue the salsa genre for the young public after the great impact that the song "Vivir Mi Vida" by Marc Anthony had, according to George's words: "We thought of a meeting of friends, of the best soneros, George told PRODU in a quality show for youth Marc Anthony, Oscar D'León, Cheo Feliciano, Andy Montañez, Luis Enrique, Willy Chirino, José Alberto "El Canario", Tito Nieves, Nora from the Orquesta de la Luz and Charlie Zaa, they accepted the invitation to be part of the best meeting of salseros of these times. I called the singers and each one said yes, the idea was that they sing their hits, I wanted a show in which people sang all the songs".

== Repertoire and recordings ==
Sergio George Presents: Salsa Giants It featured fifteen tracks, eight of these tracks were produced by George, and all of these were composed and written by multiple composers. "Aguanilé", for example, was composed by Héctor Lavoe and Willie Colón in 1970 for the album El Juicio, the song was re-recorded in 2007 by Marc Anthony for the Soundtrack album El Cantante inspired by the film of the same name, "Yo No Sé Mañana" composed by Jorge Luís Piloto and Jorge Villamizar recorded in 2009 for their album Ciclos which would win Best Salsa Album in 2010 and win the Latin Grammy Award for Best Tropical Song at the 10th Annual Latin Grammy Awards. "Un Disco Más" by the Colombian singer Charlie Zaa was recorded in 1995 for his album Sentimientos which was released in 1996 through Sonolux Records, composed and written by Leopoldo Gonzáles, originally the song had been performed by Ecuadorian pasillos and boleros singer Julio Jaramillo becoming hits in both cases indisputable for both interpreters. Sentimientos given a Premio Lo Nuestro award for "Tropical Album of the Year".

"Valió la Pena" by Marc Anthony was composed in its Latin pop version for the album Amar Sin Mentiras in 2004 by José Luis Pagán, Fernando Estefano Salgado and by Anthony himself and later adapted to the album carried by himself. Same to a Salsa version that was produced by Sergio George, from the same album there is also "Tu Amor Me Hace Bien" that was also composed in Latin Pop and later in Salsa Version.

== Commercial performance ==
The album was released in the United States on 24 June 2013. The Recording Industry Association of America (RIAA) certified Sergio George Presents: Salsa Giants Latin gold on 31 January 2014 for shipments of 30,000 copies.

== Singles ==
"Para Celebrar" released on 12 June 2013 It was the only single from the album and was performed in November 2013 at the 14th Annual Latin Grammy Awards.

== Track list ==
All tracks were produced by Sergio George.

Sergio George Presents: Salsa Giants track listing
No.	Title	Writer(s)	Performers	Length
1.	"Aguanilé"	William Anthony Colón; Héctor Pérez Martínez	Marc Anthony	6:28
2.	"Yo No Sé Mañana"	Jorge Luís Piloto; Jorge Alberto Villamizar	Luis Enrique	5:43
3.	"Mi Bajo y Yo"	Víctor Mendoza	Oscar D'León	5:38
4.	"Discúlpeme Señora"	Luis Antonio Castillo	Jose Alberto "El Canario"	5:49
5.	"Fabricando Fantasías"	Jorge Luís Piloto; Raúl Del Sol	Tito Nieves	5:07
6.	"Un Disco Más"	Leopoldo Gonzáles	Charlie Zaa	2:36
7.	"Medias Negras"	Joaquín Ramón Martínez	Willy Chirino	5:52
8.	"Casi Te Envidio"	Francisco López Cepero García; Francisco Martínez Moncada	Andy Montañez	4:37
9.	"Tu Amor Me Hace Bien"	Estéfano Alonso Salgado	Marc Anthony	5:21
10.	"De Mí Enamórate"	Alberto Aguilera Valadez	Tito Nieves	4:30
11.	"Mata Siguaraya"	Lino Frías	Oscar D'León	4:32
12.	"Anacaona"	Tite Curet Alonso	Cheo Feliciano	5:03
13.	"Salsa Caliente del Japón"	Suzuki Etsuko; Gem Ogiml	Orquesta de la Luz	5:52
14.	"Valió la Pena"	Estéfano; José Luis Pagán; Marco Antonio Muñiz	Marc Anthony	5:52
15.	"Para Celebrar"	Sergio George; Jorge Luís Piloto	Sergio George's Salsa Giants	4:18
Total length:				77:18

== Personnel ==
The following credits are from AllMusic.

=== Performers ===
- José Aguirre — trumpet
- Tito Allen — vocals (background), chorus
- Jorge Díaz — trombone
- Diego Galé — congas
- Sergio George — piano, keyboards
- Diego Giraldo — vocals (background), chorus
- Guianko Gómez — vocals (background), chorus
- Pepe Montes — keyboards
- Tommy Ruiz — chorus
- Rubén Rodríguez — bass
- José Sibaja — trumpet
- Antonio Vázquez — trombone
- Víctor Vázquez — trombone
- Robert Vilera — timbales

=== Technical ===
- Carlos Álvarez — engineer, mixing engineer
- Juan Mario "Mayito" Aracil — engineer
- Pablo Croce — music director
- Valério Do Carmo — art director
- Gregory Elías — executive producer
- Sergio George — executive producer, music director
- Guianko Gómez — associate producer
- Gerardo Lopez — production assistant
- Andrés Wolf — photography
- Catalina Wolf — concert coordinator

=== Primary artists ===
- Marc Anthony
- Oscar D'León
- Charlie Zaa
- José Alberto "El Canario"
- Willy Chirino
- Orquesta de la Luz
- Luis Enrique
- Tito Nieves
- Andy Montañez
- Cheo Feliciano

== Certifications ==
Region	Certification	Certified units/sales
Mexico (AMPROFON)	Platinum	60,000^{^}
United States (RIAA)	Gold (Latin)	30,000^{^}
^{^} Shipments figures based on certification alone.

== See also ==
- 2013 in Latin music
