= List of Billboard Latin Rhythm Airplay number ones of 2013 =

The Billboard Latin Rhythm Airplay is a chart that ranks the best-performing Spanish-language Latin rhythm singles in the United States. Published by Billboard magazine, the data are compiled by Nielsen SoundScan based collectively on each single's weekly airplay.

== Chart history ==
Key
†	Indicates number 1 on Billboard's year-end Latin rhythm chart

Issue date	Song	Artist	Ref
January 5	"Limbo" †	Daddy Yankee	
January 12	"Limbo" †	Daddy Yankee	
January 19	"Algo Me Gusta de Ti"	Wisin & Yandel featuring Chris Brown and T-Pain	
January 26	"Algo Me Gusta de Ti"	Wisin & Yandel featuring Chris Brown and T-Pain	
February 2	"Limbo" †	Daddy Yankee	
February 9	"Limbo" †	Daddy Yankee	
February 16	"Zumba"	Don Omar	
February 23	"Zumba"	Don Omar	
March 2	"Zumba"	Don Omar	
March 9	"Zumba"	Don Omar	
March 16	"Zumba"	Don Omar	
March 23	"Zumba"	Don Omar	
March 30	"Zumba"	Don Omar	
April 6	"Zumba"	Don Omar	
April 13	"Zumba"	Don Omar	
April 20	"Zumba"	Don Omar	
April 27	"Zumba"	Don Omar	
May 4	"Zumba"	Don Omar	
May 11	"Zumba"	Don Omar	
May 18	"Zumba"	Don Omar	
May 25	"Zumba"	Don Omar	
June 1	"Limbo" †	Daddy Yankee	
June 8	"Limbo" †	Daddy Yankee	
June 15	"Limbo" †	Daddy Yankee	
June 22	"Limbo" †	Daddy Yankee	
June 29	"Rompe la Cintura"	Alexis & Fido	
July 6	"Rompe la Cintura"	Alexis & Fido	
July 13	"Rompe la Cintura"	Alexis & Fido	
July 20	"Zumba"	Don Omar	
July 27	"Limbo" †	Daddy Yankee	
August 3	"Limbo" †	Daddy Yankee	
August 10	"Hablé de Ti"	Yandel	
August 17	"Hablé de Ti"	Yandel	
August 24	"Hablé de Ti"	Yandel	
August 31	"Hablé de Ti"	Yandel	
September 7	"Hablé de Ti"	Yandel	
September 14	"Hablé de Ti"	Yandel	
September 21	"Hablé de Ti"	Yandel	
September 28	"Hablé de Ti"	Yandel	
October 5	"Hablé de Ti"	Yandel	
October 12	"Hablé de Ti"	Yandel	
October 19	"Hablé de Ti"	Yandel	
October 26	"Hablé de Ti"	Yandel	
November 2	"Que Viva la Vida"	Wisin	
November 9	"Que Viva la Vida"	Wisin	
November 16	"Que Viva la Vida"	Wisin	
November 23	"Que Viva la Vida"	Wisin	
November 30	"Que Viva la Vida"	Wisin	
December 7	"Que Viva la Vida"	Wisin	
December 14	"Que Viva la Vida"	Wisin	
December 21	"Que Viva la Vida"	Wisin	
December 28	"Que Viva la Vida"	Wisin	
