= List of number-one Billboard Latin Pop Airplay songs of 2012 =

The Billboard Latin Pop Airplay is a chart that ranks the best-performing Spanish-language Pop music singles of the United States. Published by Billboard magazine, the data are compiled by Nielsen SoundScan based collectively on each single's weekly airplay.

== Chart history ==
Issue date	Song	Artist	Ref
January 7	"Promise"	Romeo Santos featuring Usher	
January 14	"El Verdadero Amor Perdona"	Maná featuring Prince Royce	
January 21	"El Verdadero Amor Perdona"	Maná featuring Prince Royce	
January 28	"El Verdadero Amor Perdona"	Maná featuring Prince Royce	
February 4	"El Verdadero Amor Perdona"	Maná featuring Prince Royce	
February 11	"Si Tú Me Besas"	Víctor Manuelle	
February 18	"Si Tú Me Besas"	Víctor Manuelle	
February 25	"Lovumba"	Daddy Yankee	
March 3	"Mi Santa"	Romeo Santos featuring Tomatito	
March 10	"Fuiste Tú"	Ricardo Arjona featuring Gaby Moreno	
March 17	"Las Cosas Pequeñas"	Prince Royce	
March 24	"Dutty Love"	Don Omar featuring Natti Natasha	
March 31	"¡Corre!"	Jesse & Joy	
April 7	"Ai Se Eu Te Pego!"	Michel Teló	
April 14	"Ai Se Eu Te Pego!"	Michel Teló	
April 21	"Ai Se Eu Te Pego!"	Michel Teló	
April 28	"Ai Se Eu Te Pego!"	Michel Teló	
May 5	"Ai Se Eu Te Pego!"	Michel Teló	
May 12	"Ai Se Eu Te Pego!"	Michel Teló	
May 19	"Ai Se Eu Te Pego!"	Michel Teló	
May 26	"Ai Se Eu Te Pego!"	Michel Teló	
June 2	"Ai Se Eu Te Pego!"	Michel Teló	
June 9	"Bailando Por El Mundo"	Juan Magan featuring Pitbull and El Cata	
June 16	"Ai Se Eu Te Pego!"	Michel Teló	
June 23	"Bailando Por El Mundo"	Juan Magan featuring Pitbull and El Cata	
June 30	"Ai Se Eu Te Pego!"	Michel Teló	
July 7	"Hasta Que Salga el Sol"	Don Omar	
July 14	"Hasta Que Salga el Sol"	Don Omar	
July 21	"Hasta Que Salga el Sol"	Don Omar	
July 28	"Hasta Que Salga el Sol"	Don Omar	
August 4	"Hasta Que Salga el Sol"	Don Omar	
August 11	"Hasta Que Salga el Sol"	Don Omar	
August 18	"Hasta Que Salga el Sol"	Don Omar	
August 25	"Hasta Que Salga el Sol"	Don Omar	
September 1	"Hasta Que Salga el Sol"	Don Omar	
September 8	"No Me Compares"	Alejandro Sanz	
September 15	"Hasta Que Te Conocí"	Maná	
September 22	"Te Quiero"	Ricardo Arjona	
September 29	"Te Quiero"	Ricardo Arjona	
October 6	"Algo Me Gusta de Ti"	Wisin & Yandel featuring Chris Brown and T-Pain	
October 13	"Algo Me Gusta de Ti"	Wisin & Yandel featuring Chris Brown and T-Pain	
October 20	"Algo Me Gusta de Ti"	Wisin & Yandel featuring Chris Brown and T-Pain	
October 27	"Algo Me Gusta de Ti"	Wisin & Yandel featuring Chris Brown and T-Pain	
November 3	"Algo Me Gusta de Ti"	Wisin & Yandel featuring Chris Brown and T-Pain	
November 10	"Algo Me Gusta de Ti"	Wisin & Yandel featuring Chris Brown and T-Pain	
November 17	"Mientras Tanto"	Tommy Torres featuring Ricardo Arjona	
November 24	"Algo Me Gusta de Ti"	Wisin & Yandel featuring Chris Brown and T-Pain	
December 1	"Algo Me Gusta de Ti"	Wisin & Yandel featuring Chris Brown and T-Pain	
December 8	"Algo Me Gusta de Ti"	Wisin & Yandel featuring Chris Brown and T-Pain	
December 15	"Algo Me Gusta de Ti"	Wisin & Yandel featuring Chris Brown and T-Pain	
December 22	"Algo Me Gusta de Ti"	Wisin & Yandel featuring Chris Brown and T-Pain	
December 29	"Volví a Nacer"	Carlos Vives	
