= Asociación Venezolana de Intérpretes y Productores de Fonogramas =

- Abbreviation: AVINPRO
- Formation: 1993
- Type: Technical standards, licensing and royalties
- Headquarters: Caracas
- Location: Venezuela
- Website: www.avinpro.com

The Asociación Venezolana de Intérpretes y Productores de Fonogramas (AVINPRO) is an industry trade group composed of Venezuelan corporations involved in the music industry founded in 1993. It serves as the affiliate member of the International Federation of the Phonographic Industry (IFPI) in the country.

The AVINPRO activities include promotion of music sales, enforcement of copyright law, and research related to the Venezuelan music industry.

The association is responsible for certifying gold and platinum albums and singles in Venezuela.

== AVINPRO Certification ==
In 1993, the Asociación Venezolana de Intérpretes y Productores de Fonogramas the music recording certification systems. It is awarded based on shipment figures of compact disc or cassette tape which was reported by record labels.

=== Certification awards ===
AVINPRO is the organization awarding music recording certifications in Venezuela. Originally album certifications were 25,000 for Silver, 50,000 for Gold, and 100,000 for Platinum certification. By 2005 the certification levels lowered to 10,000 for Gold albums and 20,000 for Platinum while the Silver certifications were discontinued. By 2007 the levels were lowered again, to 5,000 and 10,000, respectively, which lasted at least until June 2013.

== See also ==
- List of music recording sales certifications
- Global music industry market share data
- Music of Venezuela
