= Clásicos de la Provincia II =

Studio album by Carlos Vives
- Released: September 30, 2009
- Recorded: Audiovisión (Bogotá, Colombia)
- Genres: Vallenato, champeta, cumbia, rock
- Label: Independent
- Producers: Carlos Vives; Andrés Castro

Carlos Vives chronology
El Rock de Mi Pueblo (2004)	Clásicos de la Provincia II (2009)	Corazón Profundo (2013)

Clásicos de la Provincia II is the twelfth album by Colombian singer/composer Carlos Vives. The album is a sequel to Vives' 1993 breakthrough album Clásicos de la Provincia and like its predecessor it is a collection of vallenato standards, updated by Carlos and his long-time backing band La Provincia.

Prior to the album's release Vives had signed a licensing deal with the supermarket company Grupo Éxito. Under the terms of the deal the album was released exclusively through stores belonging to the Éxito group on September 30, 2009, in exchange for being priced at COP$16,000, about half the normal retail price for an album. The album's low price contributed to record sales for an album in Colombia, with 42,500 copies sold on the first day of release. It sold 300,000 copies in the country, as of 2010.

== Track listing ==
1. "El Pollo Vallenato" (Luis Enrique Martínez) – 3:15
2. "Sí, Sí, Sí" (Juancho Polo Valencia) – 3:22
3. "Sin Ti" (Náfer Durán) – 3:20
4. "Las Mujeres" (Carlos Huertas) – 3:48
5. "Momentos de Amor" (Fernando Meneses Romero) – 3:33
6. "Confidencias" (Gustavo Gutiérrez) – 3:19
7. "El Contrabandista" (Sergio Moya Molina) – 3:11
8. "Frente a Mí" (Octavio Daza) – 3:44
9. "La Parrandita" (Leandro Díaz) – 4:00
10. "La Bogotana" (Rafael Sánchez) – 3:45
11. "Mujer Conforme" (Máximo Mobil) – 4:11
12. "La Colegiala" (Rubén Darío Salcedo) – 3:34
13. "La Caja Negra" (Rafael Valencia) – 3:28
14. "La Muchachita" (Alejo Durán) – 3:05
15. "Noche sin Luceros" (Rosendo Romero) – 3:28

== Personnel ==
- Carlos Vives - Director, Vocals, Producer, Arrangement
- Egidio Cuadrado - Accordion
- Mayté Montero - Gaita, Additional arrangement
- Andrés Castro - Guitars, Arrangement, Producer
- Luis Ángel "El Papa" Pastor - Bass, Additional arrangement
- Pablo Bernal - Drums
- Archie Peña - Percussion
- Rodny Teran - Percussion
- Carlos Ivan Medina - Piano, Keyboards, Organ, Additional arrangement
- Ron Taylor - Keyboards
- Alfredo Rosado - Caja Vallenata
- Eder Polo - Guaracharaca
- Carlos Huertas Jr. & Juan Deluque - Backing vocals
- Konstantin Litvinenko - Cello
- Pedro Alonso - Violin

== Sales ==
Region	Certification	Certified units/sales
Colombia	—	300,000
