= List of Hot 100 number-one singles of 2013 (Brazil) =

This is a list of number one singles on the Billboard Brasil Hot 100 chart in 2013. Note that Billboard publishes a monthly chart.

== Chart history ==
Issue date	Song	Artist(s)	Reference
January	"Esse Cara Sou Eu"	Roberto Carlos	
February	"Sogrão Caprichou"	Luan Santana	
March	"Sogrão Caprichou"	Luan Santana	
April	"Vidro Fumê"	Bruno e Marrone	
May	"Te Esperando"	Luan Santana	
June	"Te Esperando"	Luan Santana	
July	"Te Esperando"	Luan Santana	
August	"Piradinha"	Gabriel Valim	
September	"Na Linha do Tempo "	Victor & Leo	
October	"Na Linha do Tempo "	Victor & Leo	
November	"Na Linha do Tempo "	Victor & Leo	
December	"Na Linha do Tempo "	Victor & Leo	

== See also ==
- Billboard Brasil
- List of number-one pop hits of 2012 (Brazil)
- Crowley Broadcast Analysis
