= List of Billboard Hot Latin Songs and Latin Airplay number ones of 2013 =

The Billboard Hot Latin Songs and Latin Airplay are charts that rank the best-performing Latin songs in the United States and are both published weekly by Billboard magazine. The Hot Latin Songs ranks the best-performing Spanish-language songs in the country based digital downloads, streaming, and airplay from all radio stations. The Latin Airplay chart ranks the most-played songs on Spanish-language radio stations in the United States.

== Chart history ==
Chart history
Issue date	Hot Latin Songs			Latin Airplay		
Issue date	Title	Artist(s)	Ref.	Title	Artist(s)	Ref.
January 5	"Algo Me Gusta de Ti"	Wisin & Yandel featuring Chris Brown and T-Pain		"¿Por Qué Les Mientes?"	Tito El Bambino and Marc Anthony	
January 12	"Algo Me Gusta de Ti"	Wisin & Yandel featuring Chris Brown and T-Pain		"¿Por Qué Les Mientes?"	Tito El Bambino and Marc Anthony	
January 19	"¿Por Qué Les Mientes?"	Tito El Bambino and Marc Anthony		"¿Por Qué Les Mientes?"	Tito El Bambino and Marc Anthony	
January 26	"Algo Me Gusta de Ti"	Wisin & Yandel featuring Chris Brown and T-Pain		"¿Por Qué Les Mientes?"	Tito El Bambino and Marc Anthony	
February 2	"Limbo"	Daddy Yankee		"¿Por Qué Les Mientes?"	Tito El Bambino and Marc Anthony	
February 9	"Limbo"	Daddy Yankee		"¿Por Qué Les Mientes?"	Tito El Bambino and Marc Anthony	
February 16	"Limbo"	Daddy Yankee		"Como Le Gusta a Tu Cuerpo"	Carlos Vives featuring Michel Teló	
February 23	"Limbo"	Daddy Yankee		"Como Le Gusta a Tu Cuerpo"	Carlos Vives featuring Michel Teló	
March 2	"Limbo"	Daddy Yankee		"Zumba"	Don Omar	
March 9	"Limbo"	Daddy Yankee		"Zumba"	Don Omar	
March 16	"Limbo"	Daddy Yankee		"Zumba"	Don Omar	
March 23	"Limbo"	Daddy Yankee		"Llévame Contigo"	Romeo Santos	
March 30	"Limbo"	Daddy Yankee		"Zumba"	Don Omar	
April 6	"Limbo"	Daddy Yankee		"Zumba"	Don Omar	
April 13	"Limbo"	Daddy Yankee		"Te Me Vas"	Prince Royce	
April 20	"Limbo"	Daddy Yankee		"Zumba"	Don Omar	
April 27	"Limbo"	Daddy Yankee		"Zumba"	Don Omar	
May 4	"Limbo"	Daddy Yankee		"Te Perdiste Mi Amor"	Thalía featuring Prince Royce	
May 11	"Limbo"	Daddy Yankee		"Zumba"	Don Omar	
May 18	"Vivir Mi Vida"	Marc Anthony		"Zumba"	Don Omar	
May 25	"Vivir Mi Vida"	Marc Anthony		"Te Amo (Para Siempre)"	Intocable	
June 1	"Vivir Mi Vida"	Marc Anthony		"Vivir Mi Vida"	Marc Anthony	
June 8	"Vivir Mi Vida"	Marc Anthony		"Vivir Mi Vida"	Marc Anthony	
June 15	"Vivir Mi Vida"	Marc Anthony		"Vivir Mi Vida"	Marc Anthony	
June 22	"Vivir Mi Vida"	Marc Anthony		"Vivir Mi Vida"	Marc Anthony	
June 29	"Vivir Mi Vida"	Marc Anthony		"Vivir Mi Vida"	Marc Anthony	
July 6	"Vivir Mi Vida"	Marc Anthony		"Vivir Mi Vida"	Marc Anthony	
July 13	"Vivir Mi Vida"	Marc Anthony		"Vivir Mi Vida"	Marc Anthony	
July 20	"Vivir Mi Vida"	Marc Anthony		"Vivir Mi Vida"	Marc Anthony	
July 27	"Vivir Mi Vida"	Marc Anthony		"Vivir Mi Vida"	Marc Anthony	
August 3	"Vivir Mi Vida"	Marc Anthony		"Vivir Mi Vida"	Marc Anthony	
August 10	"Vivir Mi Vida"	Marc Anthony		"Vivir Mi Vida"	Marc Anthony	
August 17	"Vivir Mi Vida"	Marc Anthony		"Vivir Mi Vida"	Marc Anthony	
August 24	"Vivir Mi Vida"	Marc Anthony		"Vivir Mi Vida"	Marc Anthony	
August 31	"Vivir Mi Vida"	Marc Anthony		"Vivir Mi Vida"	Marc Anthony	
September 7	"Darte un Beso"	Prince Royce		"Darte un Beso"	Prince Royce	
September 14	"Darte un Beso"	Prince Royce		"Loco"	Enrique Iglesias featuring Romeo Santos	
September 21	"Darte un Beso"	Prince Royce		"Loco"	Enrique Iglesias featuring Romeo Santos	
September 28	"Propuesta Indecente"	Romeo Santos		"Bailar Contigo"	Carlos Vives	
October 5	"Propuesta Indecente"	Romeo Santos		"Propuesta Indecente"	Romeo Santos	
October 12	"Propuesta Indecente"	Romeo Santos		"Hablé de Ti"	Yandel	
October 19	"Loco"	Enrique Iglesias featuring Romeo Santos		"Loco"	Enrique Iglesias featuring Romeo Santos	
October 26	Darte un Beso	Prince Royce		"Darte un Beso"	Prince Royce	
November 2	Darte un Beso	Prince Royce		"Carnaval"	Tito el Bambino	
November 9	Darte un Beso	Prince Royce		"Propuesta Indecente"	Romeo Santos	
November 16	Darte un Beso	Prince Royce		"Loco"	Enrique Iglesias featuring Romeo Santos	
November 23	Darte un Beso	Prince Royce		"Que Viva la Vida"	Wisin	
November 30	Darte un Beso	Prince Royce		"Loco"	Enrique Iglesias featuring Romeo Santos	
December 7	Loco	Enrique Iglesias featuring Romeo Santos		"Loco"	Enrique Iglesias featuring Romeo Santos	
December 14	Darte un Beso	Prince Royce		"Come with Me"	Ricky Martin	
December 21	"Loco"	Enrique Iglesias featuring Romeo Santos		"Que Viva la Vida"	Wisin	
December 28	Darte un Beso	Prince Royce		"Loco"	Enrique Iglesias featuring Romeo Santos	
