= Volví a Nacer =

Single by Carlos Vives

from the album Corazón Profundo
- Released: September 24, 2012
- Recorded: 2012
- Genre: Tropipop
- Length: 3:32
- Label: Sony Music Latin
- Songwriter: Carlos Vives
- Producers: Carlos Vives, Andrés Castro

Carlos Vives singles chronology
"La Fuerza del Amor" (2005)	"Volví a Nacer" (2012)	"Como Le Gusta a Tu Cuerpo" (2013)

"Volví a Nacer" (transl. "I Was Born Again") is a song written and performed by Colombian recording artist Carlos Vives and co-produced by Andrés Castro. Following an international hiatus, it was released as the lead single from his thirteenth studio album Corazón Profundo (2013) on September 24, 2012. The song's lyrics are in Spanish and were inspired by the events of his music career as well as his wife Claudia Elena Vásquez. It is described by Vives as a romantic song with elements of Colombian vallenato and pop music.

"Volví a Nacer" was both a critical and commercial success where it peaked at number one in Colombia, Mexico, Venezuela, and on the Billboard Hot Latin Songs chart in the United States. The song was well received by critics who described it as the best track on the album. The success of the song led to Vives winning six Nuestra Tierra awards in his home country and two Latin Grammys for Song of the Year and Best Tropical Song. The music video for the song was directed by Carlos Pérez and filmed in Mexico.

A remixed version of "Volví a Nacer", performed by Vives and Colombian singer Maluma, was used as the theme song of Mexican telenovela Despertar contigo.

== Background ==
Following the release of El Rock de Mi Pueblo in 2004, Carlos Vives left his former record label EMI Latin when he and the record label could not come to an agreement over the renewal of his contract. This resulted in a five-year hiatus where Vives did not record an album until 2009, when he released Clásicos de la Provincia II, a collection of Colombian traditional songs which was only released in Colombia. On September 10, 2012, he signed a management deal with former Universal Music Latino president Walter Kolm. In addition to the deal, he also announced that he would be working on a new album to be released in 2013, with a single to promote the album to be released later that same month. The lead single, "Volví a Nacer" was released on September 24, 2012. Four months later, Vives signed a contract with his new record label Sony Music Latin, which would launch his album Corazón Profundo on April 23, 2013.

== Music and lyrics ==
Carlos Vives "Volví a Nacer"
A 22-second sample of the song, "Volví a Nacer". Vives was inspired by his wife and the experiences of his music career. The song is described by Vives as a mixture of ballad and Colombian vallenato music.

"Volví a Nacer" was written by Vives and co-produced by him and Andrés Castro. The song's composition is dedicated to his wife, former Miss Colombia Claudia Elena Vásquez, and inspired by various experiences in his life. Vives describes the music as a "song of love" with a mixture of romantic pop ballad and the "joy" of Colombian vallenato music. In addition to the original recording, vallenato and cumbia versions of the song were produced, as well as an urban remix featuring Puerto Rican reggaeton artist J Alvarez. A ballad version was also later included on the deluxe edition of the album.

== Critical reception ==
In his review of the album, David Jeffries of Allmusic said that "Volví a Nacer" "kicks off the album in a warm and familiar style" and called it an "obvious highlight". Carlos Quintana of About.com claims that the song is not only the "best", but "also the most meaningful one in terms of the music career of Carlos Vives". Hector Aviles of Latin Music Café listed it as one of the "3, great happy songs" on the album. The song served as the theme song of the 2013 Chilean telenovela Solamente Julia.

At the 2013 Colombian Nuestra Tierra awards, "Volví a Nacer" won Best Song of the Year and Best Tropical Song of the Year, while Vives himself was awarded Artist of the Year and Tropical Artist of the Year, making him the biggest winner of the night. At the 14th Latin Grammy Awards award ceremony, the song received two awards for Song of the Year and Best Tropical Song, and a nomination for Record of the Year. It was recognized as one of the best-performing Tropical Songs of the Year at the 21st ASCAP Latin music awards. "Volví a Nacer" was nominated Tropical Song of the Year at the 2014 Lo Nuestro Awards. The song was recognized as one of the best-performing Latin songs of 2013 at the 2014 BMI Latin Awards.

In 2016, a remixed version of "Volví a Nacer" by Vives and Maluma was released and served as the theme song of Televisa's telenovela Despertar contigo, produced by Pedro Damián, and starring Ela Velden and Daniel Arenas.

== Chart performance ==
In Colombia, "Volví a Nacer" debuted at number three on the National-Report chart on the week of September 30, 2012. It reached number one on the chart the following week, succeeding "Solitaria" by Alkilados featuring Dalmata. It spent sixteen consecutive weeks on top of the chart until it was replaced by Vives's follow-up single "Como Le Gusta a Tu Cuerpo" featuring Michel Teló. In the United States, the song debuted at number one on the Billboard Hot Latin Songs chart, becoming his fifth number song on the chart and the tenth artist to achieve this feat.

In Mexico, it reached number one on the Monitor Latino chart in the week ending December 2, 2012, displacing "Aguaje Activado" by Calibre 50, until the latter song regained its number one position two weeks later. It also peaked at number twenty-nine on the Billboard Mexican Airplay chart. In Venezuela, it hit number one on the Record Report Top 100 chart in the week ending March 9, 2013 and spent two weeks on top of the chart until it was replaced by "¿Por Qué Les Mientes?" by Tito El Bambino featuring Marc Anthony. It peaked at thirty-seven in Honduras and twenty-eight in Spain.

== Music video ==
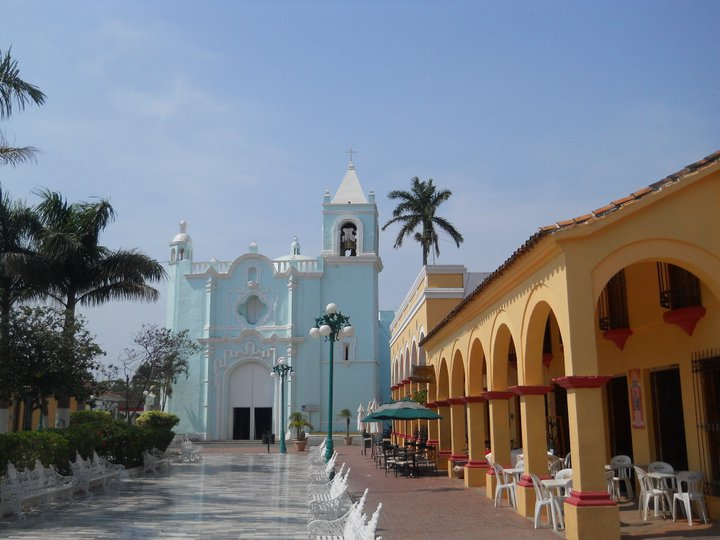
Tlacotalpan, Veracruz (pictured) where the music video for "Volví a Nacer" was filmed

The music video for "Volví a Nacer was filmed in Tlacotalpan, Veracruz on September 30, 2012. It was directed by Carlos Pérez of Elastic People and released on November 5, 2012. It features Vives and Mexican actors Leticia Fabián and Rubén Zamora as the main characters. The video received a Nuestra Tierra award for Video of the Year.

=== Synopsis ===
The music video begins with Vives waking up and seeing two women in the bed with him. He remembers being seduced by them when he was drunk the night before. Realizing this, he packs his belongings and leaves the house. He is seen driving a car until it runs out fuel which forces him to travel by foot where he eventually arrives at a town. In another house, a woman (played by Fabián) wakes up recalling the events of her abusive husband (played by Zamora). She enters a church and says a prayer. Later, Vives is seen hanging out with two men at an outdoor bar when he spots the woman whom he immediately becomes smitten with. Afterwards, he and the two men are fishing on a boat when Vives sees the woman again. He begins having illusions of him and the woman having a happy life together which drives him insane in his room. That night, the woman finds her husband making love to another woman in a car. Upon discovering this, she leaves the house. At the same time, the town is holding a festival where Vives is celebrating with the townsfolk. The video concludes with him and the woman seeing each other once more and they decide to go out together.

== Live performances ==
On November 2, 2012, Carlos Vives performed "Volví a Nacer" in Ecuador during a festival in Guayaquil. Ten days later, Vives performed the song with his band on La Voz Colombia. The following day, he sang the song live on Idol Puerto Rico where he thanked the audience for supporting his music career. He also performed it live at the 2013 Lo Nuestro, Nuestra Tierra, and Latin Grammy award ceremonies. "Volví a Nacer" was included as part of the set list for his 'Corazón Profundo Tour' across the United States and Latin America.

== Track listing ==
- Digital download
1. "Volví a Nacer" – 3:41
- 2016 Version
1. "Volví a Nacer (feat. Maluma)" – 3:49
- Volví a Nacer (Remixes) – EP
1. "Volví a Nacer" – 3:41
2. "Volví a Nacer (Cumbia Version)" – 3:36
3. "Volví a Nacer (Vallenato Version)" – 3:36
4. "Volví a Nacer (feat. J Alvarez)" – 3:24

== Credits and personnel ==
Credits adapted from the "Volví a Nacer" liner notes.

- Carlos Vives – co-production, vocals, songwriting, music director
- Andrés Castro – production
- Curt Schneider – mixing
- Tom Coyne – mastering

== Charts ==
=== Weekly charts ===
Chart (2012)	Peak position
Colombia (National-Report)	1
Honduras (Honduras Top 50)	37
Mexico (Billboard Mexican Airplay)	29
Mexico (Monitor Latino)	1
US Hot Latin Songs (Billboard)	1
US Latin Airplay (Billboard)	1
US Latin Pop Airplay (Billboard)	1
US Tropical Airplay (Billboard)	1

Chart (2013)	Peak position
Spain (PROMUSICAE)	28
Venezuela (Record Report)	1

=== Year-end charts ===
Chart (2012)	Position
US Latin Tropical Airplay	35

Chart (2013)	Position
US Latin Songs	27
US Latin Pop Songs	11
US Latin Tropical Airplay	31

== Certifications ==
Region	Certification	Certified units/sales
Mexico (AMPROFON)	Gold	30,000^{*}
Spain (Promusicae)	Gold	30,000^{‡}
United States (RIAA)	8× Platinum (Latin)	480,000^{‡}
United States (RIAA) 2016 version	Gold (Latin)	30,000^{‡}
^{*} Sales figures based on certification alone.^{‡} Sales+streaming figures based on certification alone.

== Release history ==
List of radio and release dates, showing country, format, version and record label
Region	Date	Format	Version	Label
United States	September 24, 2012	Top 40/Mainstream radio	Main single	Sony Music Entertainment
United States	October 5, 2012	Digital download	Main single	Sony Music Entertainment
United States	December 17, 2012	Digital download	Remixes EP	Sony Music Entertainment

== See also ==
- List of Billboard Hot Latin Songs and Latin Airplay number ones of 2012
- List of number-one Billboard Hot Latin Pop Airplay of 2012
- List of number-one songs of 2012 in Colombia
- List of number-one songs of 2012 (Mexico)
- List of number-one songs of 2013 in Colombia
