= Limbo (Daddy Yankee song) =

Single by Daddy Yankee

from the album Prestige
- Released: September 7, 2012; February 19, 2013 (Remix); April 1, 2013 (Spanglish Version)
- Genre: Reggaeton; EDM; Latin pop
- Length: 3:44
- Label: El Cartel, Sony Music
- Songwriters: Ramon Ayala, Elizier Palacios, Giencarlos Rivera, Jonathan Rivera, Francisco Saldaña
- Producers: Luny, MadMusick

Daddy Yankee singles chronology
"Pasarela" (2012)	"Limbo" (2012)	"More than Friends" (2013)

Music video
- "Limbo" on YouTube

"Limbo" is a song by Puerto Rican reggaeton recording artist Daddy Yankee from his sixth studio album Prestige (2012). It was produced by MadMusick, the duo of Giencarlos Rivera, and Jonathan Rivera, in partnership with Luny Tunes. The music video features ZumbaUnderground dancers Stephanie Hartgraves and Megan Phillips, Oceanside Ca. It was composed by Ramon Ayala, Elizier Palacios, Giencarlos Rivera, Jonathan Rivera, Francisco Saldaña and released as the fourth single from the album, following the commercial successes of "Ven Conmigo", "Lovumba" and "Pasarela". An official remix with Puerto Rican-duo Wisin & Yandel as well as a Spanglish version of the song were also later released. The song appears in dance games Just Dance 2014 and Zumba Fitness: World Party.

== Composition ==
"Limbo" was written specially for Zumba Fitness demonstrating "the dance fitness' company's now-towering presence in the Latin music industry." It was composed by Ramon Ayala, Elizier Palacios, Giencarlos Rivera, Jonathan Rivera and Francisco Saldaña. According to Yankee, he wanted "Limbo to invite the imagination, ignite creativity, to step away from the norm and bring something completely different."

== Release and chart performance ==
The official remix with Puerto Rican-duo Wisin & Yandel was released on February 19, 2013. A Spanglish version was also released on April 1, 2013. The song peaked at number one on the US Billboard Latin Songs and Billboard Latin Pop Songs chart, currently spending thirteen weeks at number one on the latter. It also reached the number three spot on the Billboard Tropical Songs chart. Internationally, The song also reached number three in Colombia, number 183 in France, number 33 in Switzerland, and number 19 and eight on Venezuela's Top 100 and Top Latino charts respectively. In Italy, "Limbo" was certified platinum by the Federation of the Italian Music Industry, denoting sales exceeding 30,000 units. Daddy Yankee performed "Limbo" as the opening of the 2013 Latin Billboard Awards surrounded by "performers pounding skyscraper-size drums". It won the Billboard Latin Music Award for Latin Rhythm Airplay Song of the Year at the ceremony in 2014.

== Music video ==
The music video was released on October 27, 2012 and as of October 2024, has over 1.3 billion views on YouTube. It was directed by Jessy Terrero and filmed at the Centro Ceremonial Otomí in Temoaya, Mexico. Terrero has also worked with Wisin & Yandel, Paulina Rubio, Leona Lewis and 50 Cent among others. The video features "girls dancing in front of temple ruins and popping out of muddy waters" while an "exotic fantasyland" is depicted. Model Natalia Subtil, choreographer Danielle Polanco and the Zumba Fitness instructor Gina Grant participate in the video amongst independent dance enthusiast Stephanie Hartgraves.

== Charts and certifications ==
=== Weekly charts ===
Chart (2012–2013)	Peak position
Argentina Hot 100 (AV Music)	4
Colombia (National-Report)	2
France (SNEP)	141
Italy (FIMI)	17
Mexican Pop Airplay (Billboard)	43
Switzerland (Schweizer Hitparade)	33
Spain (Promusicae)	46
Peru Airplay (UNIMPRO)	4
US Heatseekers Songs (Billboard)	22
US Bubbling Under Hot 100 (Billboard)	15
US Hot Latin Songs (Billboard)	1
US Latin Pop Airplay (Billboard)	1
US Latin Airplay (Billboard)	2
US Latin Rhythm Airplay (Billboard)	1
US Tropical Airplay (Billboard)	3
Venezuela Top Latino (Record Report)	1

=== Year-end charts ===
Annual chart rankings for "Limbo"
Chart (2013)	Rank
Italy (FIMI)	73
US Hot Latin Songs (Billboard)	2
US Latin Airplay Songs (Billboard)	2
US Latin Digital Songs (Billboard)	4
US Latin Streaming Songs (Billboard)	16
US Latin Pop Airplay Songs (Billboard)	1
US Tropical Airplay Songs (Billboard)	39
Chart (2014)	Peak position
US Latin Digital Songs (Billboard)	14
US Latin Streaming Songs (Billboard)	13
Chart (2015)	Peak position
US Latin Digital Songs (Billboard)	19
US Latin Streaming Songs (Billboard)	23

=== Decade-end charts ===
Chart (2010–2019)	Position
US Hot Latin Songs (Billboard)	17

=== All-time charts ===
Chart (2021)	Position
US Hot Latin Songs (Billboard)	46

=== Sales and certifications ===
Region	Certification	Certified units/sales
Chile	Gold	
Italy (FIMI)	2× Platinum	100,000^{‡}
Spain (Promusicae)	4× Platinum	400,000^{‡}
Streaming
Spain (Promusicae)	Platinum	8,000,000^{†}
^{‡} Sales+streaming figures based on certification alone.^{†} Streaming-only figures based on certification alone.

== See also ==
- List of number-one Billboard Hot Latin Songs of 2013
- List of Billboard Latin Rhythm Airplay number ones of 2013
