= Zumba (song) =

Single by Don Omar

Single by Don Omar

from the album MTO²: New Generation
- Released: October 2, 2012
- Recorded: 2011
- Genre: Latin; Zumba
- Length: 4:25
- Label: Universal Latino; Machete
- Songwriters: Ramon Casillas-Rios; Robin Mendez; Don Omar; Christian Ramos-Lopez
- Producer: Ray "El Ingeniero" Casillas.

Don Omar singles chronology
"Ella No Sigue Modas" (2012)	"Zumba" (2012)	"Feeling Hot" (2013)

"Zumba" is a Latin tropical pop song written by Don Omar and is the second track from the album MTO²: New Generation (2012). The song was released digitally on October 2, 2012. It is the main song for the video game Zumba Fitness Core, which was released in October 2012 for the Kinect and Wii.

== Composition ==
"Zumba" is a mid-tempo reggaeton and pop song with tropical music influences.

== Charts ==
Chart (2013)	Peak position
Argentina (Top 20)	3
Chile (Top 20)	4
Greece (Top 20)	9
Switzerland (Schweizer Hitparade)	62
US Hot Latin Songs (Billboard)	2
US Latin Pop Airplay (Billboard)	1
US Tropical Airplay (Billboard)	11
US Latin Airplay (Billboard)	1
US Latin Rhythm Airplay (Billboard)	1

== See also ==
- List of Billboard number-one Latin songs of 2013
- List of Billboard Latin Rhythm Airplay number ones of 2013
