= Bailar Contigo (Carlos Vives song) =

Single by Carlos Vives

from the album Corazón Profundo
- Released: May 5, 2013
- Genre: Latin pop; tropipop
- Length: 4:12
- Label: Sony Music
- Songwriters: Carlos Vives; Andrés Castro

Carlos Vives singles chronology
"Como Le Gusta a Tu Cuerpo" (2013)	"Bailar Contigo" (2013)	"La Foto de los Dos" (2013)

"Bailar Contigo" (transl. "Dance With You") is a tropipop song by Colombian recording artist Carlos Vives. It was released in Colombian's radios as the third single from his fourteenth studio album Corazón Profundo (2013) on May 5, 2013.

== Song information ==
The song was written by himself and Andrés Castro and produced by the same Castro. "Bailar Contigo" has been described as one of the best track of the album according to the review of Allmusic. And Carlos Quintana from About.com said that "is the electric guitar in the intro of the song, have well-crafted arrangements and nice lyrics".

In an interview in Colombia, Vives expressed that the song "Is a tribute to the ceremony to dance with that special woman. I composed it remembering that time, of that eagerness to go on a friday, when had a plan to go dancing with somebody and finally meet with that person. Evokes the romance, that love symbolized in the ritual of going to pick her up and go dancing".

== Track listing ==
- Album version
1. "Bailar Contigo" - 4:12

== Charts ==
=== Weekly charts ===
Chart (2013)	Peak position
Colombia (National-Report)	1
Mexico (Billboard Mexican Airplay)	14
Mexico (Monitor Latino)	11
US Hot Latin Songs (Billboard)	6
US Latin Airplay (Billboard)	1
US Latin Pop Airplay (Billboard)	2
US Tropical Airplay (Billboard)	4
Venezuela (Record Report)	4

=== Year-end charts ===
Chart (2013)	Position
Mexico (Monitor Latino)	91
US Latin Songs	40
US Latin Pop Songs	20
US Latin Tropical Airplay	27

== Certifications ==
Region	Certification	Certified units/sales
United States (RIAA)	2× Platinum (Latin)	120,000^{‡}
^{‡} Sales+streaming figures based on certification alone.

== See also ==
- List of number-one songs of 2013 (Colombia)
- List of Billboard number-one Latin songs of 2013

== Release history ==
Region	Date	Format	Label
Colombia	May 5, 2013	Radio	Sony Music Latin Entertainment
