= Como Le Gusta a Tu Cuerpo =

Single by Carlos Vives featuring Michel Teló

from the album Corazón Profundo
- Released: January 21, 2013
- Genre: Latin pop, Tropipop, Vallenato, sertanejo universitário
- Length: 3:32
- Label: Sony Music
- Songwriter: Carlos Vives / Andres Castro

Carlos Vives singles chronology
"Volví a Nacer" (2012)	"Como Le Gusta a Tu Cuerpo" (2013)	"Bailar Contigo" (2013)

Michel Teló singles chronology
"Amiga da Minha Irmã" (2013)	"Como Le Gusta a Tu Cuerpo" (2013)	"Levemente Alterado" (2013)

"Como Le Gusta a Tu Cuerpo" (transl. How Your Body Likes It) is a Latin pop song by Colombian recording artist Carlos Vives featuring the Brazilian musician Michel Teló. It was released on January 21, 2013, as the second single from his fourteenth studio album Corazón Profundo. The song features lyrics in both Spanish and Portuguese.

== Chart performance ==
"Como Le Gusta A Tu Cuerpo" debuted at the top of the National-Report chart dated on the week of January 21, 2013, due to the strong radio airplay and debuted at #14 in Venezuela, on May 11, 2013, the song top the charts on Venezuela being the first number on hit for Teló and the second for Vives. The single has peaked at #3 on the US Billboard Latin Songs chart. In Mexico the song debuted at #20, peaked three weeks after at #16.

== Music video ==
On 2 April, Vives uploaded a picture on Facebook where he was accompanied by Michel Teló on a beach in San Andrés, the caption of the picture explains the fact of their reunion, playing some football and recording a new music video. A behind the scenes of the music video was uploaded on April 12 through Vives' YouTube VEVO channel. The video was filmed in an exclusive area of San Andrés, under direction of Jessy Terrero who also directed many videos of international artists as Daddy Yankee, Wisin & Yandel, Enrique Iglesias and many others. The music video premiered on 16 April 2013 on YouTube and VEVO. The video stars Vives and Teló, as well as Colombian top model and ex-Miss San Andrés Laura Archbold.

== Track listing ==
Digital download
No.	Title	Writer(s)	Producer(s)	Length
1.	"Como Le Gusta a Tu Cuerpo" (featuring Michel Teló)	Carlos Vives / Andres Castro	Carlos Vives / Andres Castro	3:49

== Charts ==
=== Weekly charts ===
Chart (2013)	Peak position
Colombia (National-Report)	1
Mexico (Billboard Mexican Airplay)	7
Mexico (Monitor Latino)	16
US Hot Latin Songs (Billboard)	3
US Latin Pop Airplay (Billboard)	2
US Latin Airplay (Billboard)	1
US Tropical Airplay (Billboard)	4
Venezuela (Record Report)	1

=== Year-end charts ===
Chart (2013)	Position
US Latin Songs	20
US Latin Pop Songs	8
US Latin Tropical Airplay	14

== Certifications ==
Region	Certification	Certified units/sales
United States (RIAA)	2× Platinum (Latin)	120,000^{‡}
^{‡} Sales+streaming figures based on certification alone.

== Release history ==
Region	Date	Format	Label
Brasil	January 21, 2012	Digital download	Sony Music Entertainment
Colombia	January 21, 2012	Digital download	Sony Music Entertainment
Mexico	January 21, 2012	Digital download	Sony Music Entertainment
United States	January 21, 2012	Digital download	Sony Music Entertainment

== See also ==
- List of number-one songs of 2013 (Colombia)
- List of Billboard number-one Latin songs of 2013
