= El Rock de Mi Pueblo =

Studio album by Carlos Vives
- Released: August 31, 2004
- Recorded: 2003–2004
- Genre: Rock en español · Vallenato · Latin pop
- Length: 42:15
- Label: Sonolux (Colombia); EMI/Virgin Records (worldwide)
- Producer: Emilio Estefan, Jr. Sebastián Krys; Andrés Castro

Carlos Vives chronology
Déjame Entrar (2001)	El Rock de Mi Pueblo (2004)	Clásicos de la Provincia II (2009)

Singles from El Rock de Mi Pueblo
- 1. "Como Tú" Released: 2004; 2. "Voy a Olvidarme de Mi" Released: 2005

El Rock de Mi Pueblo (transl. The Rock of My Village) is the eleventh studio album recorded by Colombian singer-songwriter Carlos Vives. It was released on August 31, 2004.

== Track listing ==
1. "Como Tú" (C. Medina, C. Vives) – 3:21
2. "Maravilla" (A. Castro, C. Vives) – 3:39
3. "Maleta de Sueños" (A. Castro, C. Vives) – 3:31
4. "Fuerza del Amor" (A. Castro, C. Medina, C. Vives) – 3:24
5. "Qué Tiene la Noche" (C. Medina, C. Vives) – 3:54
6. "Voy a Olvidarme de Mí" (C. Vives) – 3:35
7. "La Llamada" (C. Vives, E. Cuadrado) – 3:38
8. "Santa Marta-Kingston-New Orleans" (A. Castro, C. Vives) – 3:50
9. "Princesa y el Soldado" (A. Castro, C. Vives) – 4:44
10. "Gallito de Caramelo" (C. Vives) – 3:35
11. "Rock de Mi Pueblo" (C. Medina, C. Vives) – 3:59
12. "El Duro – El Original" (C. Vives) – 1:07

== Personnel ==
Credits for El Rock de Mi Pueblo from liner notes.

=== Musicians ===
- Carlos Vives – Vocals, Guitar, Choir
- Archie Pena – Percussion, Conga, Drums, Redoblante
- Sebastian Krys – Choir
- Mayte Montero – Maracas, Gaita, Guache
- Ramon Benítez – Bombard
- Egidio Cuadrado – Accordion, Choir
- Andrés Castro – Acoustic guitar, Electric guitar, Charango, Choir
- Carlos Huertas – Choir
- Pablo Bernal – Drums
- Tedoy Mullet – Trombone, Trumpet
- Carlos Ivan Medina – Choir
- Luis Ángel – Double Bass, Six-String Bass
- Paquito Hechavarría – Piano
- Gaitanes – Choir
- Ricardo Gaitán – Choir
- Alberto Gaitán – Choir

=== Production ===
- Emilio Estefan Jr. – Producer
- Sebastian Krys – Producer
- Andrés Castro – Producer
- Carlos Vives – Liner Notes
- Scott Canto – Engineer
- Mike Couzzi – Engineer
- Bob Ludwig – Mastering
- Kevin Dillon – Logistics
- Mayte Montero – Arranger
- Lucho Correa – Graphic Design
- Egidio Cuadrado – Arranger
- David Heuer – Engineer
- Javier Garza – Engineer
- Elias Chacin – Assistant Engineer
- Steve Menezes – Studio Coordinator
- Jose A. Maldonado – Logistics
- Trevor Fletcher – Studio Coordinator

== Charts and certifications ==
=== Weekly charts ===
Chart (2004)	Peak position
US Billboard 200	192
US Latin Albums	4
US Tropical Albums	2
US Heatseekers Albums	12

=== Sales and certifications ===
Region	Certification	Certified units/sales
United States (RIAA)	Platinum (Latin)	100,000^{^}
^{^} Shipments figures based on certification alone.
