= National-Report =

Colombian music chart publisher

- Industry: Music
- Founded: September 2009
- Headquarters: Colombia
- Website: www.national-report.com

The National-Report is the Colombian music industry standard singles popularity chart tracking company. Chart rankings are based on radio play and issued weekly. The data are compiled by monitoring radio stations through an automated system in real-time. National-Report also monitors data from Venezuela and Ecuador. The company provides the Top 100 Nacional, with only the first 20 positions released to the public, and the rest of the chart only available for subscribers.

== Records, milestones and achievements ==
This is a listing of significant achievements and milestones based upon the National-Report Top 100 Nacional.

=== Song achievements ===
==== Most weeks at number one ====
- 19 weeks

Carlos Vives ft Shakira — "La Bicicleta" (2016)

- 18 weeks

ChocQuibTown — "Cuando te veo" (2015)

- 16 weeks

Carlos Vives — "Volví a Nacer" (2012–13)

- 15 weeks

Maluma — "Borró Cassette" (2015)

- 13 weeks

Carlos Vives featuring Michel Teló — "Como Le Gusta A Tu Cuerpo" (2013)

- 11 weeks

Carlos Vives featuring ChocQuibTown — "El Mar de Sus Ojos" (2014)
Enrique Iglesias featuring Gente de Zona & Descemer Bueno — "Bailando" (2014–15)
Luis Fonsi featuring Daddy Yankee – "Despacito" (2017)

- 10 weeks

Carlos Vives — "Bailar Contigo" (2013)
Carlos Vives — "La Foto de los Dos" (2013–14)
Felipe Pelaez — "Vestirse de Amor (La Flor)" (2016)

=== Artist achievements ===
==== Most number one singles ====
Number of singles	Artist
9	Carlos Vives
4 (tie)	J Balvin
4 (tie)	Alkilados
4 (tie)	Juanes
3 (tie)	ChocQuibTown
3 (tie)	Maluma
2 (tie)	Ricky Martin
2 (tie)	Dalmata
2 (tie)	Andy Rivera
2 (tie)	Michel Teló
2 (tie)	Marc Anthony
2 (tie)	Nicky Jam
