= La Foto de los Dos =

Single by Carlos Vives

from the album Corazón Profundo
- Released: October 4, 2013
- Genre: Latin pop, Tropipop
- Length: 3:32
- Label: Sony Music Latin
- Songwriters: Carlos Vives and Andrés Castro
- Producers: Carlos Vives, Andrés Castro

Carlos Vives singles chronology
"Bailar Contigo" (2013)	"La Foto de los Dos" (2013)	"El Mar de Sus Ojos" (2014)

"La Foto de los Dos" (transl. "Our Photo") is a song written, produced, and performed by Colombian recording artist Carlos Vives. It was released in October 2013 as the fourth single from his studio album Corazón Profundo.

== Track listing ==
- Album version
1. "La Foto de los Dos" - 4:09

== Charts ==
Chart (2013)	Peak position
Colombia (National-Report)	1
US Latin Airplay (Billboard)	7
US Latin Pop Airplay (Billboard)	4
US Tropical Airplay (Billboard)	26

=== Year-end charts ===
Chart (2013)	Position
Colombia (National-Report)	19
Chart (2014)	Position
US Latin Pop Songs	35

== Certifications ==
Region	Certification	Certified units/sales
United States (RIAA)	Platinum (Latin)	60,000^{‡}
^{‡} Sales+streaming figures based on certification alone.
