= Carlos Vives discography =

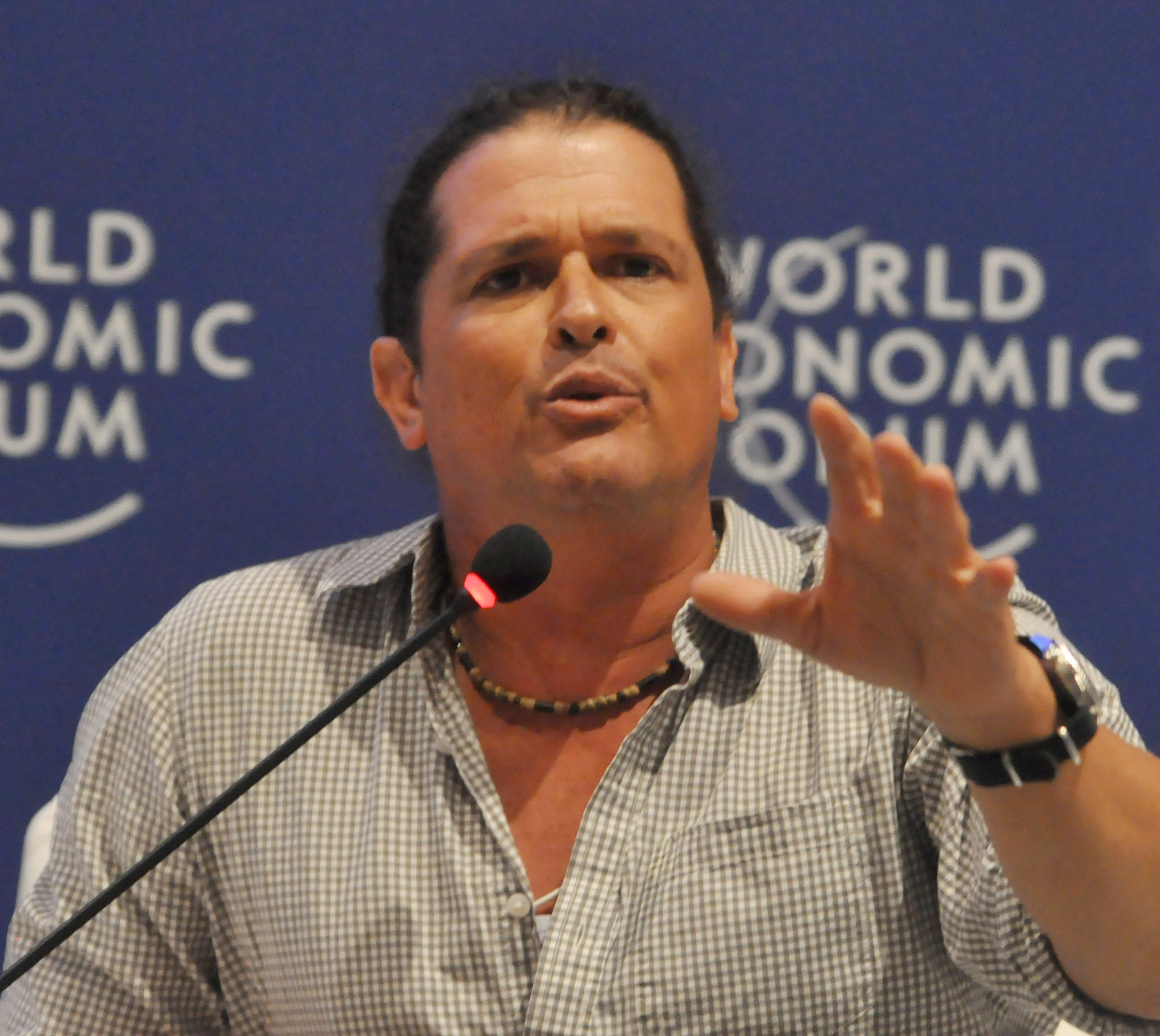
- Vives speaking at the World Economic Forum on Latin America in 2010
- Studio albums: 14
- EPs: 1
- Live albums: 2
- Singles: 30
- Video albums: 3
- Music videos: 103

Colombian musician Carlos Vives has released eighteen studio albums, thirty singles, three video albums and one hundred three music videos.

== Studio albums ==
List of albums, with selected chart positions
Title	Album details	Peak chart positions				Certifications	Sales
Title	Album details	ARG	SPA	US	US Latin	Certifications	Sales
Por Fuera y Por Dentro	Released: 1986; Label: FM Discos & Cintas; Format: LP	—	—	—	—		
No Podrás Escapar de Mí	Released: 1987; Label: Sony Music; Format: LP	—	—	—	—		
Al Centro de la Ciudad	Released: June 6, 1989; Label: Sony Music; Format: LP	—	—	—	—		
Escalona: "Un Canto a La Vida"	Released: 1991; Label: Sony Music; Format: LP, cassette	—	—	—	—		
Escalona: Vol. 2	Released: 1992; Label: Sony Music; Format: LP, cassette	—	—	—	—		
Clásicos de la Provincia	Released: February 22, 1994; Label: PolyGram, Sonolux; Format: CD, LP, cassette	—	8	—	2	ASINCOL: Diamond; AMPROFON: Gold; PROMUSICAE: 2× Platinum; RIAA: Gold (Latin)	COL: 1,400,000; World: 4,000,000
La Tierra del Olvido	Released: July 25, 1995; Label: PolyGram, Sonolux; Format: CD, cassette	—	—	—	5	ASINCOL: 3× Platinum	
Tengo Fe	Released: August 12, 1997; Label: Sonolux; Format: CD, cassette	—	42	—	12	ASINCOL: 6× Platinum	COL: 360,000
El Amor de Mi Tierra	Released: October 19, 1999; Label: EMI; Format: CD, cassette	—	8	—	2	ASINCOL: 2× Platinum; PROMUSICAE: 3× Platinum; RIAA: 2× Platinum (Latin)	World: 1,000,000 (as of 2000); SPA: 350,000 (as of 2000)
Dejame Entrar	Released: November 6, 2001; Label: EMI; Format: CD	—	41	—	1	RIAA: 2× Platinum (Latin)	
El Rock de Mi Pueblo	Released: August 31, 2004; Label: EMI; Format: CD	—	22	192	4	RIAA: Platinum (Latin)	
Clásicos de la Provincia II	Released: September 30, 2009; Label: Independent; Format: CD	—	—	—			COL: 200,000
Corazón Profundo	Released: April 23, 2013; Label: Sony Music Latin; Format: CD, digital download	2	10	61	1	ASINCOL: 2× Diamond; RIAA: Platinum (Latin); APFV: Platinum	COL: 120,000
Más + Corazón Profundo	Released: May 13, 2014; Label: Sony Music Latin; Format: CD, digital download	8	66	—	5	ASINCOL: 4× Platinum; AMPROFON: Gold; RIAA: Platinum (Latin)	
Vives	Released: November 10, 2017; Label: Sony Music Latin; Format: CD, digital download	—	57	—	5	AMPROFON: 2× Platinum+Gold; RIAA: 7× Platinum (Latin)	
Cumbiana	Released: May 22, 2020; Label: Sony Music Latin; Format: CD, digital download	—	—	—	—	ASINCOL: 7× Platinum	
Cumbiana II	Released: May 13, 2022; Label: Sony Music Latin; Format: CD, digital download	—	—	—	—	RIAA: Platinum (Latin)	
Escalona Nunca Se Había Grabado Así	Released: April 18, 2023; Label: Sony Music Latin; Format: CD, digital download	—	—	—	—		
"—" denotes items which were not released in that country or failed to chart.

== Extended plays ==
List of extended plays, with selected details
Title	Extended play details
Masters en Parranda (Colombian Pop Collection)	Released: November 25, 2021; Label: Sony Music Latin; Format: Digital download, streaming

== Singles ==
=== As lead artist ===
List of singles as lead artist, with selected chart positions and certifications, showing year released and album name
Title	Year	Peak chart positions										Certifications	Album
Title	Year	COL	ARG	FRA	ITA	MEX	POR	SPA	US	US Latin	VEN	Certifications	Album
"No Podras Escapar de Mí"	1987	—	—	—	—	—	—	—	—	30	—		No Podrás Escapar de Mí
"La Gota Fría"	1993	—	—	—	—	—	—	8	—	6	—	IFPI CH: Platinum; RIAA: 3× Platinum (Latin)	Clásicos de la Provincia
"El Cantor de Fonseca"	1994	—	—	—	—	—	—	—	—	—	—		Clásicos de la Provincia
"Alicia Adorada"	1994	—	—	—	—	—	—	—	—	25	—		Clásicos de la Provincia
"Amor Sensible"	1994	—	—	—	—	—	—	—	—	—	—		Clásicos de la Provincia
"Compae Chipuco"	1994	—	—	—	—	—	—	—	—	—	—		Clásicos de la Provincia
"Matilde Lina"	1994	—	—	—	—	—	—	—	—	—	—		Clásicos de la Provincia
"La Hamaca Grande"	1994	—	—	—	—	—	—	—	—	13	—		Clásicos de la Provincia
"La Tierra del Olvido"	1995	—	—	—	—	—	—	—	—	5	—	RIAA: 2× Platinum (Latin)	La Tierra del Olvido
"Pa' Mayté"	1995	—	—	—	—	—	—	—	—	12	—	RIAA: Platinum (Latin)	La Tierra del Olvido
"Fidelina"	1996	—	—	—	—	—	—	—	—	—	—		La Tierra del Olvido
"Que Diera"	1997	—	—	—	—	—	—	—	—	—	—		Tengo Fe
"Tengo Fe"	1997	—	—	—	—	—	—	—	—	—	—		Tengo Fe
"Caballito"	1997	1	—	—	—	—	—	—	—	—	—		Tengo Fe
"Fruta Fresca"	1999	—	—	—	—	—	—	2	—^{[A]}	1	—		El Amor de Mi Tierra
"Tu Amor Eterno"	2000	—	—	—	—	—	—	—	—	29	—		El Amor de Mi Tierra
"19 de Noviembre"	2000	—	—	—	—	—	—	—	—	—	—		El Amor de Mi Tierra
"La Cartera"	2001	—	—	—	—	—	—	—	—	—	—		El Amor de Mi Tierra
"Déjame Entrar"	2001	—	—	—	—	—	—	—	—^{[B]}	1	—		Déjame Entrar
"Luna Nueva"	2002	—	—	—	—	—	—	—	—^{[C]}	1	—		Déjame Entrar
"Carito"	2002	—	—	—	—	—	—	—	—	14	—		Déjame Entrar
"Papadio"	2003	—	—	—	—	—	—	—	—	40	—		Déjame Entrar
"A Las Doce Menos Diez"	2003	—	—	—	—	—	—	—	—	—	—		Déjame Entrar
"Como Tú"	2004	—	—	—	—	—	—	—	—^{[D]}	1	—		El Rock de Mi Pueblo
"Voy A Olvidarme De Mi"	2005	—	—	—	—	—	—	—	—	10	—		El Rock de Mi Pueblo
"La Maravilla"	2005	—	—	—	—	—	—	—	—	—	—		El Rock de Mi Pueblo
"La Fuerza del Amor"	2005	—	—	—	—	—	—	—	—	—	—		El Rock de Mi Pueblo
"Volví a Nacer" (solo or featuring J Alvarez/Maluma)	2012	1	—	—	—	1	—	28	—	1	1	AMPROFON: Gold; PROMUSICAE: Gold; RIAA: 8× Platinum (Latin)	Corazón Profundo
"Como Le Gusta a Tu Cuerpo" (featuring Michel Teló)	2013	1	—	—	—	7	—	—	—	4	1	RIAA: 2× Platinum (Latin)	Corazón Profundo
"Bailar Contigo"	2013	1	—	—	—	14	—	—	—	6	1	RIAA: 2× Platinum (Latin)	Corazón Profundo
"La Foto de los Dos"	2013	1	—	—	—	—	—	—	—	—	—	RIAA: Platinum (Latin)	Corazón Profundo
"El Mar de Sus Ojos" (featuring ChocQuibTown)	2014	1	—	—	—	—	—	—	—	11	1	RIAA: 2× Platinum (Latin)	Más + Corazón Profundo
"Cuando Nos Volvamos a Encontrar" (featuring Marc Anthony)	2014	1	—	—	—	—	—	—	—	10	1	RIAA: 6× Platinum (Latin)	Más + Corazón Profundo
"Ella Es Mi Fiesta" (solo or featuring Maluma)	2014	1	—	—	—	—	—	—	—	21	1	RIAA: 4× Platinum (Latin)	Más + Corazón Profundo
"Nota de Amor" (with Wisin, featuring Daddy Yankee)	2015	2	—	—	—	41	—	—	—	5	14	AMPROFON: Gold; PROMUSICAE: Gold; RIAA: 5× Platinum (Latin)	Los Vaqueros: La Trilogía
"Las Cosas de la Vida"	2015	1	—	—	—	—	—	—	—	13	—	RIAA: Gold (Latin)	Más + Corazón Profundo
"La Bicicleta" (with Shakira or featuring Maluma)	2016	1	2	30	75	1	17	1	95	2	1	IFPI CH: Platinum; SNEP: Gold; FIMI: Platinum; AMPROFON: 2× Diamond+Platinum+Gold; PROMUSICAE: 7× Platinum; IFPI SWI: Gold; RIAA: 41× Platinum (Latin)	Vives
"Al Filo de Tu Amor" (solo or featuring Wisin)	2017	—	—	—	—	32	—	63	—	18	—	AMPROFON: Gold; RIAA: 3× Platinum (Latin)	Vives
"Robarte un Beso" (with Sebastián Yatra)	2017	1	2	—	—	3	—	16	—	13	—	FIMI: Gold; AMPROFON: Diamond+4× Platinum+Gold; PROMUSICAE: 4× Platinum; RIAA: 3× Diamond (Latin)	Vives
"Nuestro Secreto"	2018	1	—	—	—	34	—	—	—	—	—	RIAA: Gold (Latin)	Vives
"El Arrepentido" (with Melendi)	2018	—	—	—	—	— (Note: "El Arrepentido" did not enter the Billboard Mexico Airplay chart, but peaked at number 9 on the Billboard Mexican Espanol Airplay chart.)	—	33	—	—	—	PROMUSICAE: Gold	Ahora
"10 Razones para Amarte" (with Martín Elías)	2018	—	—	—	—	—	—	—	—	—	—		Non-album single
"Un Poquito" (with Diego Torres)	2018	—	—	—	—	—	—	—	—	—	—	AMPROFON: Gold; RIAA: Platinum (Latin)	Atlántico a pie
"Déjame Quererte" (featuring Cholo Valderrama, Cynthia Montaño, Elkin Robinson, Kombilesa Mí and Velo de Oza)	2019	—	—	—	—	—	—	—	—	—	—		Non-album singles
"Si Me Das Tu Amor" (with Wisin)	2019	—	—	—	—	—	—	—	—	—	—	RIAA: Platinum (Latin)	Non-album singles
"No Te Vayas"	2020	—	—	—	—	—	—	—	—	—	—	RIAA: Platinum (Latin)	Cumbiana
"For Sale" (with Alejandro Sanz)	2020	—	—	—	—	—	—	—	—	—	—	RIAA: Platinum (Latin)	Cumbiana
"Cumbiana"	2020	—	—	—	—	—	—	—	—	—	—	RIAA: Gold (Latin)	Cumbiana
"Tambores"	2021	—	—	—	—	—	—	—	—	—	—		Non-album single
"Canción Bonita" (with Ricky Martin)	2021	1	25	—	—	11	—	41	—	23	6	AMPROFON: Gold; PROMUSICAE: Gold; RIAA: 7× Platinum (Latin)	Cumbiana II
"Soy Cordobés"	2021	—	—	—	—	—	—	—	—	—	—		Non-album single
"Besos en Cualquier Horario" (with Mau y Ricky and Lucy Vives)	2021	—	—	—	—	—	—	—	—	—	—	RIAA: Platinum (Latin)	Cumbiana II
"Colombia, Mi Encanto"	2021	—	—	—	—	—	—	—	—	—	—	RIAA: Gold	Encanto (soundtrack)
"Dime (Masters en Parranda)" (with Gusi and Llane)	2021												Masters en Parranda (Colombian Pop Collection)
"Baloncito Viejo" (with Camilo)	2022	—	—	—	—	—	—	—	—	—	—	RIAA: Platinum (Latin)	Cumbiana II
"—" denotes a title that was not released or did not chart in that territory

=== Promotional singles ===
List of singles, with selected chart positions
Title	Year	Peak chart positions	Album
Title	Year	SPA	Album
"Los Buenos Tiempos"	1997	—	Tengo Fe
"Pambé"	1997	—	Tengo Fe
"El Amor de Mi Tierra"	2000	17	El Amor de Mi Tierra
"La Fantástica"	2013	—	Corazón Profundo
"No Te Pongas Triste"	2013	—	Parranda All-Stars: Navidad
"—" denotes a title that did not chart, or was not released in that territory.

== Other charted songs ==
List of other charted songs, with selected chart positions
Title	Year	Peak chart positions			Album
Title	Year	US	US Latin	WW	Album
"Colombia, Mi Encanto"	2022	100	6	166	Encanto (Original Motion Picture Soundtrack)

== Videography ==
=== Video albums ===
Title	Video details
Clásicos de la Provincia	Released: 1993; Label: Sonolux; Format: VHS
Más Corazón Profundo Tour	Released: 2015; Label: Sony Music Latin; Format: DVD
Desde el Estadio El Campín de Bogotá	Released: 2016; Label: Sony Music Latin; Format: DVD

=== Music videos ===
Year	Title	Album
1987	"No podrás escapar de mí"	No podrás escapar de mí
1993	"Alicia adorada" (2 versions)	Clásicos de la provincia
1993	"El cantor de Fonseca"	Clásicos de la provincia
1993	"La celosa"	Clásicos de la provincia
1993	"Altos del Rosario"	Clásicos de la provincia
1993	"Matilde Lina"	Clásicos de la provincia
1993	"La Hamaca grande"	Clásicos de la provincia
1993	"Compae Chipuco"	Clásicos de la provincia
1993	"Amor sensible"	Clásicos de la provincia
1993	"La gota fría" (2 versions)	Clásicos de la provincia
1995	"La tierra del olvido"	La tierra del olvido
1995	"Pa' Mayté"	La tierra del olvido
1996	"Fidelina"	La tierra del olvido
1997	"Que diera"	Tengo fe
1997	"Tengo fe"	Tengo fe
1997	"Caballito"	Tengo fe
1998	"Los buenos tiempos"	Tengo fe
1998	"Pambé"	Tengo fe
1999	"Fruta fresca"	El amor de mi tierra
2000	"Tu amor eterno"	El amor de mi tierra
2001	"Déjame entrar"	Déjame entrar
2001	"Luna nueva"	Déjame entrar
2002	"Carito"	Déjame entrar
2004	"Como tú"	El rock de mi pueblo
2004	"Voy a olvidarme de mí"	El rock de mi pueblo
2012	"Volví a nacer"	Corazón profundo
2013	"Cómo le gusta a tu cuerpo" (with Michel Teló)	Corazón profundo
2013	"Bailar conmigo"	Corazón profundo
2013	"La foto de los dos"	Corazón profundo
2014	"El mar de sus ojos" (with ChocQuibTown)	Más + Corazón profundo
2014	"Cuando nos volvamos a encontrar" (lyric video) (with Marc Anthony)	Más + Corazón profundo
2014	"Cuando nos volvamos a encontrar" (with Marc Anthony)	Más + Corazón profundo
2015	"La tierra del olvido" (re-recorded with various Colombian artists)	non-album
2015	"Las cosas de la vida"	Más + Corazón profundo
2016	"La bicicleta" (with Shakira)	Vives
2016	"Al filo de tu amor"	Vives
2017	"Robarte un beso" (with Sebastián Yatra)	Vives
2017	"El orgullo de mi patria"	Vives
2017	"Pesca'ito"	Vives
2017	"Nuestro secreto"	Vives
2018	"Hoy tengo tiempo"	Vives
2018	"Mañana"	Vives
2018	"Déjame quererte"	non-album
2019	"Si me das tu amor" (with Wisin)	non-album
2020	"No te vayas"	Cumbiana
2020	"No te vayas (Remix)" (lyric video) (with Manuel Turizo)	non-album
2020	"No te vayas" (home video)	Cumbiana
2020	"For Sale" (with Alejandro Sanz)	Cumbiana
2020	"For Sale" (home video) (re-recorded with Alejandro Sanz)	non-album
2020	"El Hilo" (performance video) (with Ziggy Marley and Elkin Robinson)	Cumbiana
2020	"Cumbiana"	Cumbiana
2020	"Cumbiana (KOGI SESSIONS Remix)"	non-album
2020	"No te vayas" (acoustic version) (with Elena Vives)	non-album
2020	"Rapsodia en La Mayor (para Elena)"	Cumbiana
2021	"Canción bonita" (with Ricky Martin)	Cumbiana II
2021	"Besos en cualquier horario" (with Mau & Ricky and Lucy Vives)	Cumbiana II
2021	"El parrandero" (with Sin Ánimo de Lucro and JBot & Tuti)	Masters en parranda
2021	"Te doy mi vida" (with Lucas Arnau, Emilia, Alex Rose and Cheo Gallego)	Masters en parranda
2021	"El problemón" (with Alejandro González, Lalo Ebratt and Yera)	Masters en parranda
2021	"Conquista" (with Jerau and Nacho)	Masters en parranda
2021	"Dime" (with Gusi and Llane)	Masters en parranda
2021	"Currambera"	Cumbiana II
2022	"Bailoncito viejo" (with Camilo)	Cumbiana II
2022	"Solo"	Cumbiana II
2022	"Babel" (with Fito Páez)	Cumbiana II
2022	"El Teke Teke" (with Black Eyed Peas and Play-N-Skillz)	Cumbiana II
2022	"Montaña solitaria" (with ChocQuibTown)	Cumbiana II
2022	"Cinerama"	Cumbiana II
2022	"Patria" (lyric video) (with Cholo Valderrama and Clemente Nérida)	Cumbiana II
2022	"Pagamento" (with Pedro Capó)	Cumbiana II
2022	"Buscando al caballo (Homenaje a Johnny Ventura)" (with Milly Quezada and Jandy Ventura)	Cumbiana II
2022	"En la selva" (with Katie James)	Cumbiana II
2022	"Besos en cualquier horario (acústico)" (with Mau & Ricky and Lucy Vives)	non-album
2022	"La historia"	Escalona nunca se había grabado así
2023	"Mala suerte"	Escalona nunca se había grabado así
2023	"El carro Ford"	Escalona nunca se había grabado así
2023	"Las mujeres" (with Juanes)	Clásicos de la provincia 30 años (Remastered & Expanded)
2023	"Los sabanales 3.0" (with Ryan Castro)	Clásicos de la provincia 30 años (Remastered & Expanded)
2023	"Eso es mondar" (with DJ Marimonda and El Elvis Cienaguero)	non-album
2025	"La tierra del olvido (versión salsa)" (with Grupo Niche)	non-album

=== Collaborations in music videos ===
Year	Title	Other Performer	Album
2001	"El último adiós"	Various artists	non-album
2015	"Nota de amor"	Wisin and Daddy Yankee	non-album
2017	"El arrepentido"	Melendi	Ahora
2018	"Un poquito"	Diego Torres	Atlántico a pie
2019	"Hasta viejitos"	Alejandro González	non-album
2020	"Ay Dios"	ChocQuibTown	non-album
2020	"Color esperanza 2020"	Various artists	non-album
2020	"La noche pinta buena"	Pacific Broders and Gente de Zona	non-album
2020	"Búscame"	Kany García	Mesa para dos
2020	"Caraluna" (re-recorded)	Bacilos	non-album
2021	"La mitad"	Nacho and Mike Bahía	non-album
2022	"Te soñé"	Carlos Rivera	Sincerándome
2022	"Cumbia del corazón"	Los Ángeles Azules	non-album
2022	"For Sale"	GIlberto Santa Rosa	non-album
2023	"Kapun"	Diego Torres	Mejor que ayer
2024	"Tres días en Cartagena"	Rozalén	El abrazo
2024	"Tú o yo"	Silvestre Dangond	non-album
2024	"Santa Marta"	Luis Fonsi	El viaje
2024	"La chancleta"	Carín León and Chimbala	La chancleta
2025	"Empinar el codo"	Jesse & Joy	Lo que nos faltó decir
2025	"La samaria"	Bomba Estéreo	non-album

== Notes ==
- A. "Fruta Fresca" did not enter the Billboard Hot 100, but peaked at number 9 on the Bubbling Under Hot 100 Singles chart, which acts as a 25-song extension to the Hot 100.
- B. "Déjame Entrar" did not enter the Billboard Hot 100, but peaked at number 7 on the Bubbling Under Hot 100 Singles chart, which acts as a 25-song extension to the Hot 100.
- C. "Luna Nueva" did not enter the Billboard Hot 100, but peaked at number 14 on the Bubbling Under Hot 100 Singles chart, which acts as a 25-song extension to the Hot 100.
- D. "Como Tú" did not enter the Billboard Hot 100, but peaked at number 7 on the Bubbling Under Hot 100 Singles chart, which acts as a 25-song extension to the Hot 100.
