= List of best-selling albums in Colombia =

The following is a list of some of the best-selling albums in Colombia, one of the largest music markets in Latin America. To appear in the list, albums must have to sell over 100,000 units.

According to insiders cited by Colombian newspaper El Tiempo, a record became a hit passing the 100,000 units and a best-seller over the 200,000 mark. Colombian's album sales peaked in the 1990s but has since decreased due factors such as piracy since 2000. Carlos Vives' Clásicos de la Provincia (1993) became the first million-seller album in country's history, according to the same publication.

National music dominate the list, leading by Diomedes Díaz and followed by artists such as Carlos Vives, Juanes, Shakira, Juancho Rois, Silvestre Dangond and Margarita Rosa de Francisco all of them appearing more than once. Some international acts such as Michael Jackson, Backstreet Boys, Eros Ramazzotti, Gloria Estefan and Julio Iglesias also appeared on the list, with Jackson and Iglesias appearing twice.

== List of best-selling albums ==
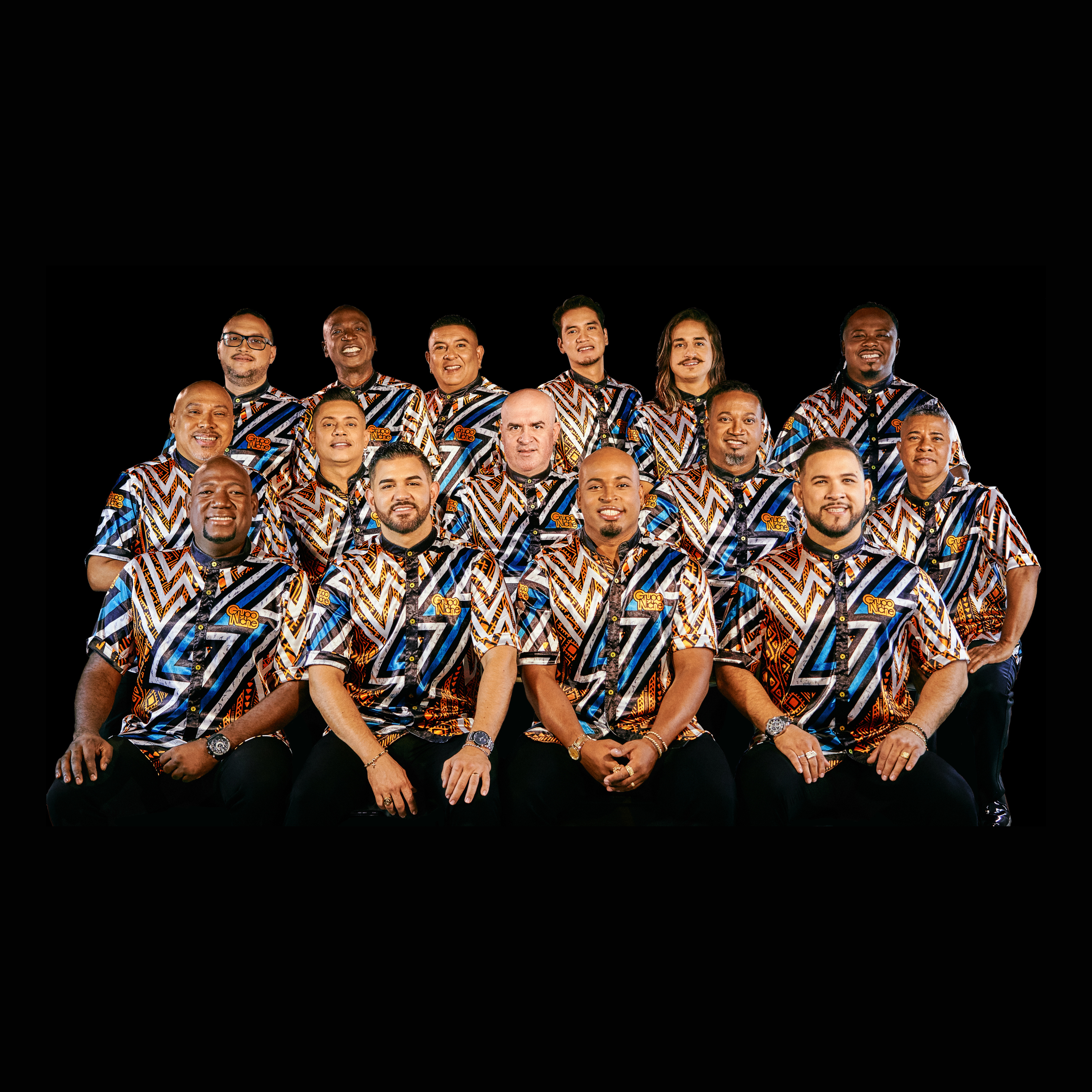
Grupo Niche arguably has the best-selling record in Colombia

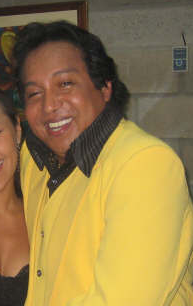
Diomedes Díaz has at least seven albums with claimed sales of over 100,000 units

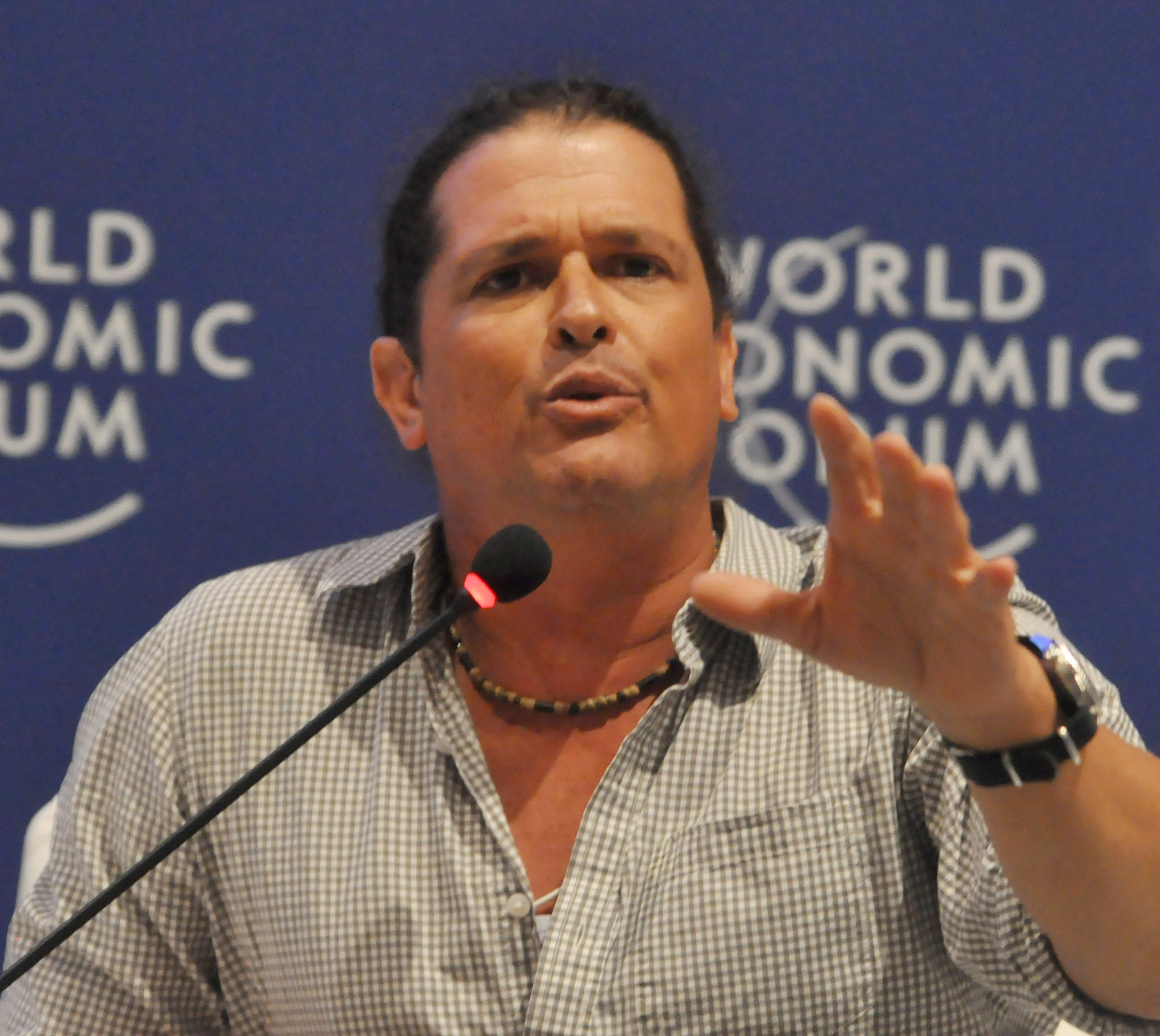
Carlos Vives has at least five albums with claimed sales of over 100,000 units

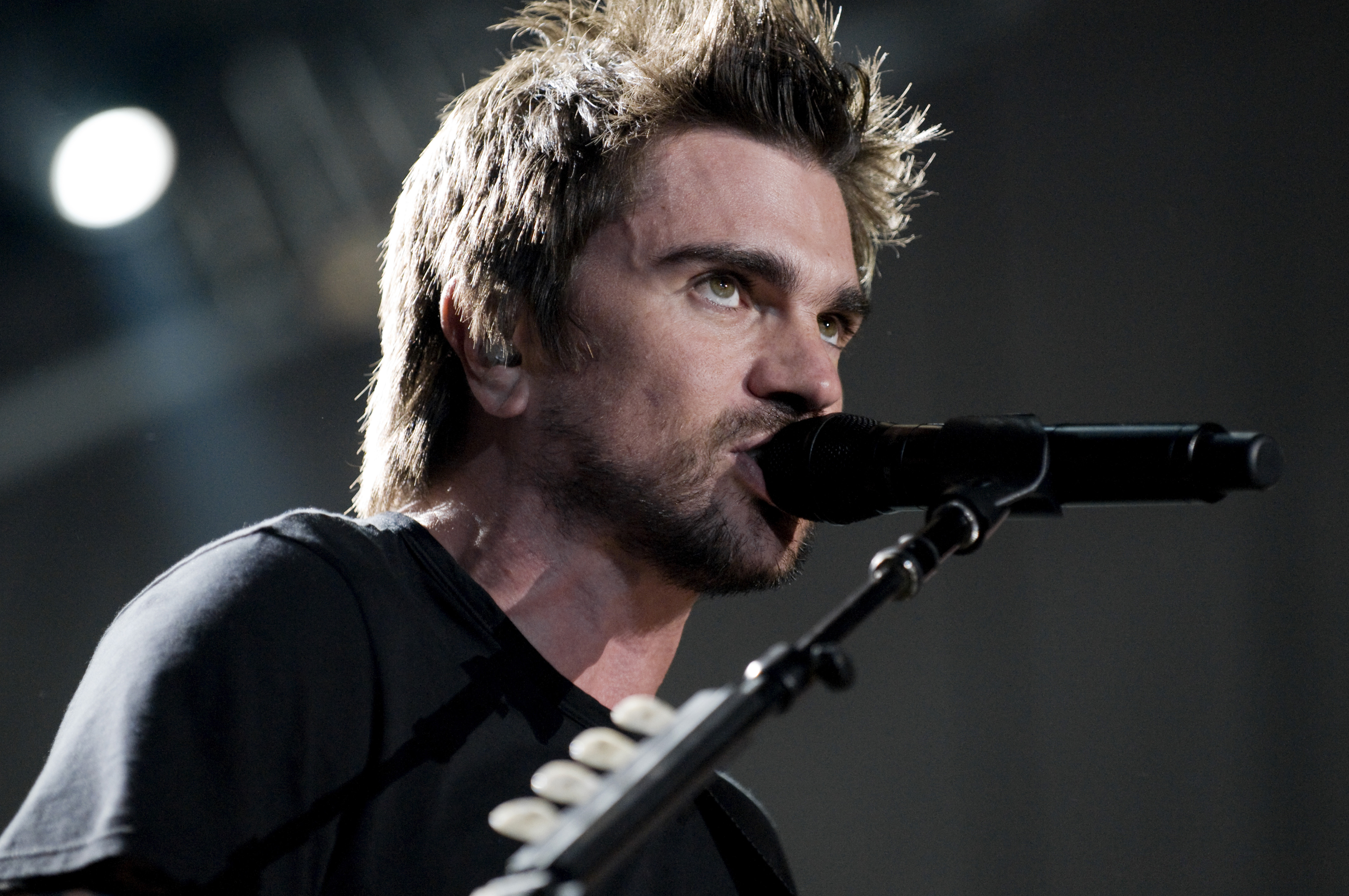
Juanes has at least five albums with claimed sales of over 100,000 units

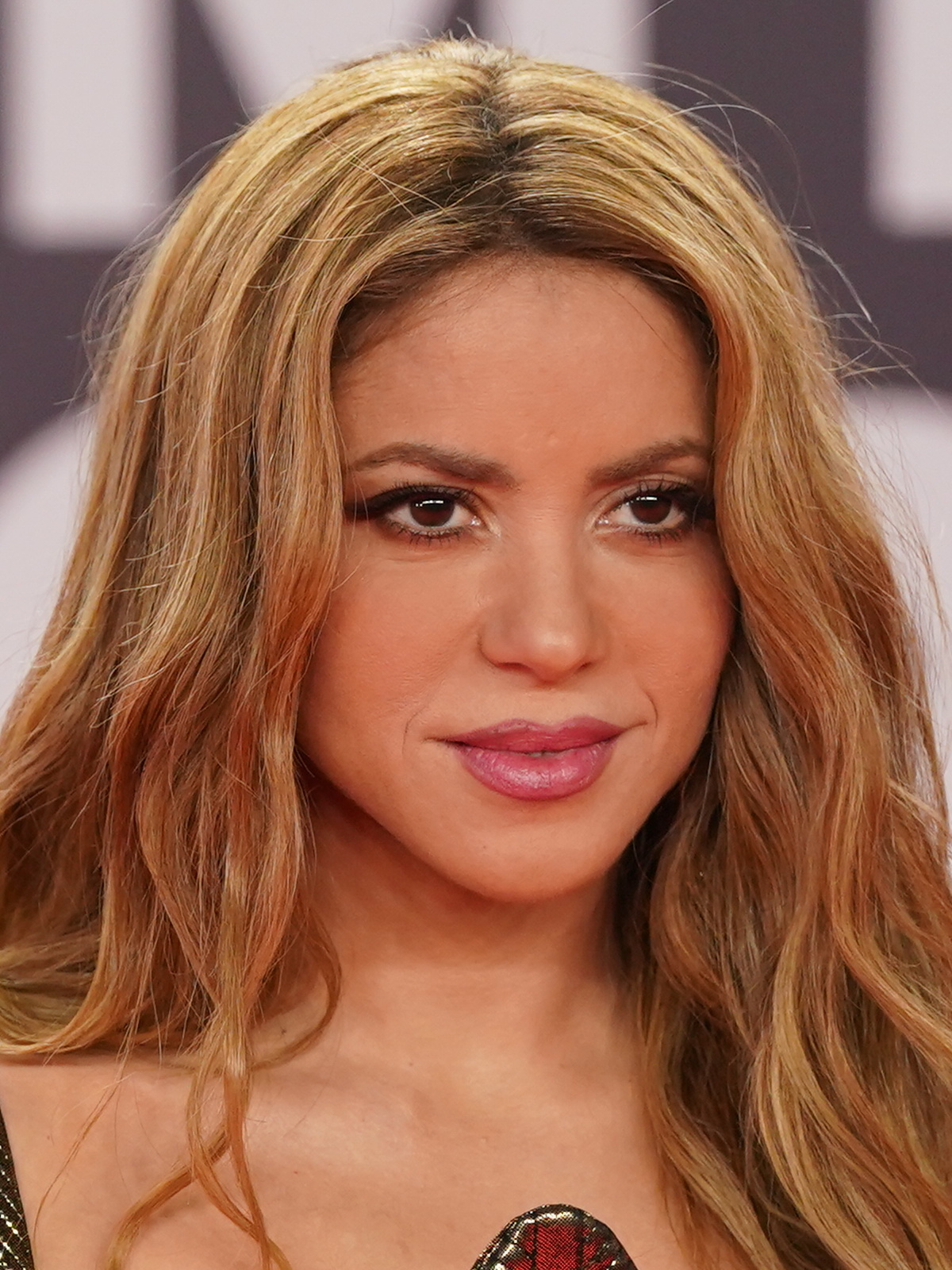
Shakira has at least four albums with claimed sales of over 100,000 units

Color
Indicates a foreign artist

Year	Title	Artist(s)	Claimed sales
1990	Cielo de Tambores	Grupo Niche	1,600,000
1993	Clásicos de la Provincia	Carlos Vives	1,500,000
1998	Mi biografía	Diomedes Díaz	1,200,000
1990	30 Grandes Éxitos	Diomedes Díaz	1,000,000
1995	Sentimientos	Charlie Zaa	1,000,000
1996	Pies Descalzos	Shakira	1,000,000
1995	La Tierra del Olvido	Carlos Vives	880,000
1997	Backstreet's Back	Backstreet Boys	800,000
1993	Título de Amor	Diomedes Díaz & Juancho Rois	600,000
2014	De Ida y Vuelta	Felipe Peláez	450,000
1994	26 de Mayo	Diomedes Díaz & Juancho Rois	450,000
1995	El Dorado	Aterciopelados	400,000
1997	Tengo Fe	Carlos Vives	360,000
1994	El santo cachón	Los Embajadores Vallenatos	350,000
1995	Un Canto Celestial	Diomedes Díaz	341,317
1994	Café, Con Aroma de Mujer	Margarita Rosa de Francisco	340,000
1980	De caché	Binomio de Oro de América	300,000
1983	Muy Nuestro	Otto Serge & Rafael Ricardo	300,000
1996	Collar de Perlas	Marbelle	300,000
1982	Todo es para ti	Diomedes Díaz	300,000
1982	Thriller	Michael Jackson	300,000
2009	Clásicos de la Provincia II	Carlos Vives	300,000
2010	Sale el Sol	Shakira	300,000
1975	Corazon Corazon (A México)	Julio Iglesias	250,000
1995	Abriendo Puertas	Gloria Estefan	250,000
1998	Volver a Vivir	Diomedes Díaz	250,000
2012	MTV Unplugged	Juanes	250,000
2014	Loco de Amor	Juanes	250,000; 240,000
2004	Mi Sangre	Juanes	200,000
2014	Tigo Music Sessions (DVD)	Juanes	200,000
2014	Shakira	Shakira	200,000
2017	Gente Valiente	Silvestre Dangond	200,000
1994	Tratar de Estar Mejor	Diego Torres	170,000
1993	Tiempo perfecto	Felipe Peláez	160,000
1993	Tutte storie (Todo historias)	Eros Ramazzotti	150,000
1996	Mar Adentro	Donato y Estefano	150,000
2007	La Vida... Es Un Ratico	Juanes	150,000
1994	Café Con Aroma de Mujer, Vol. 2	Margarita Rosa de Francisco	120,000
1994	Segundo Romance	Luis Miguel	120,000
1995	HIStory: Past, Present and Future, Book I	Michael Jackson	120,000
2013	Corazón Profundo	Carlos Vives	120,000
2005	Pasión de Gavilanes	Various	100,000
2005	Fijación Oral, Vol. 1	Shakira	100,000
1994	Pa' Que Chupen	Karamelo	100,000
2011	No Me Compares Con Nadie	Silvestre Dangond	100,000
2011	1	Julio Iglesias	100,000
2011	Ilusión	Fonseca	100,000
2013	La Familia	J Balvin	100,000
2015	PB.DB The Mixtape	Maluma	100,000

== Best-selling artists in Colombia ==
Although reports lack of verified audit, some media publications have estimated Colombian sales for Diomedes Díaz from 8 million to as high as 20 million, while Mexican singer Vicente Fernandez have been attributed with 5 million copies.

== See also ==
- ASINCOL
- List of best-selling albums by country
- List of best-selling singles by country§Colombia

== Notes ==
- ^{‡}Certification include on-demand audio and video streams and track sale equivalent
