= 20 De Colección (Carlos Vives album) =

Compilation album by Carlos Vives
- Released: June 21, 1994
- Genre: Latin
- Label: Sony Music

20 De Colección is a compilation album by Colombian singer/musician Carlos Vives released on June 21, 1994. The collection was released as part of the Sony International 20 De Colección series.

The album is one of many Vives "hits" collections that appeared shortly after the singer's breakthrough Clasicos de la Provincia, exposing fans unfamiliar with Vives's earlier work. Vives's previous pop/ballad albums No Podrás Escapar de Mí and Al Centro de la Ciudad, which met with lukewarm reception, are both compiled here in their entirety, in original song order. The last two tracks come from the soundtrack Escalona: Un Canto a la Vida, which marked the beginning of Vive's signature vallenato sound.

== Track listing ==
No.	Title	Writer(s)	Length
1.	"No Podrás Escapar De Mí"	J. Piloto
2.	"Sin Negativo"	M. Patiño
3.	"Ya No Quiero Volverme Tan Loco"	C. García
4.	"Si Es Que Te Vas"	S. Villar
5.	"Tu Y Yo"	E. Ramazzotti., P. Cassano., Adelio
6.	"Mas Que Tu, No Hay Nadie"	J. Piloto
7.	"Quedate Aqui"	J. Piloto
8.	"Amigo Mio"	J. Piloto
9.	"Quizas Porque"	C. García)
10.	"Aventurera"	C. Vives	4:20
11.	"Te Extrañare"	P. Manavello	4:20
12.	"Por Ti Me Casare"	E. Ramazzotti	4:02
13.	"Me Estoy Muriendo de Amor"	F. Garavito	3:47
14.	"Casi un Hechizo"	R. Montaner, P. Manavello	3:18
15.	"Tonta Audaz"	P. Manavello	3:49
16.	"Simplemente un Corazon"	P. Manavello	4:02
17.	"Al Centro de la Ciudad"	C. Vives	3:55
18.	"Cancion de Amor Eterno"	C. Vives	1:51
19.	"El Testamento"	R. Escalona	2:53
20.	"Jamie Molina"	R. Escalona	3:31
