= Déjame Entrar =

Déjame Entrar may refer to:

- Déjame Entrar (album), an album by Colombian singer/composer Carlos Vives
- "Déjame Entrar" (Carlos Vives song)
- "Déjame Entrar" (Maná song), a song by Maná from the 1995 album Cuando los Ángeles Lloran
- "Déjame Entrar" (Makano song)
- "Déjame Entrar", a song by Rauw Alejandro from the 2024 album Cosa Nuestra
- Déjame Entrar, the Spanish name of Let the Right One In (film), a Swedish horror film
