= Colección =

Colección and variants may refer to:

== Art ==
- Colección Júmex

== Music ==
- Colección (Roy Brown album), compilation album
- La Colección (Master Joe and O.G. Black album), compilation album
- La Colección (Lucero album) Melody Records 1990
- La Colección, compilation album by Alejandra Guzman Melody Records 1990
- La Colección, compilation album by Menudo (band) 1990
- Colección Privada, compilation album by Mónica Naranjo
- Colección Definitiva, compilation album by Alejandro Sanz
- Colección Romantica Juan Luis Guerra
- La Mejor... Colección Marco Antonio Solís 2007
- La Más Completa Colección (Marco Antonio Solís album)
- La Más Completa Colección (Jenni Rivera album)

== See also ==
- De Colección (disambiguation)
- 20 De Colección (disambiguation)
