= Al Centro de la Ciudad =

Studio album by Carlos Vives
- Released: June 6, 1989
- Recorded: 1989
- Genre: Latin
- Length: 33:24
- Labels: CBS Records International; Columbia Records; Sony Discos
- Producer: Pablo Manavello

Carlos Vives chronology
No Podrás Escapar de Mí (1987)	Al Centro de la Ciudad (1989)	Escalona: Un Canto a la Vida (1991)

Al Centro de la Ciudad (To the Center of Town) is the third album released by Colombian singer/composer Carlos Vives, released on June 6, 1989.

Vives was better known as a star of television soap operas at the time of its release. Songs such as "Aventurera" and "Te Extrañare" on telenovelas would give Vives further mainstream exposure, as well as notable attention from the public. It is his final album to feature synthesizer-romantic ballads, and pop, predating his Clásicos de la Provincia breakthrough in the vallenato genre.

== Description ==
Before Carlos Vives was the "King of Vallenato" and one of Colombia's hottest musical exports, he was a struggling young star in Latin television. With soap operas, or telenovelas, being a springboard for Latin Americans seeking fame, Vives was no exception. In his home country of Colombia, the Santa Marta-born, and Bogotá raised actor cut his teeth in a number of shows including "Pequeños Gigantes" (Little Giants - 1983) and "Tuyo es Mi Corazón (Yours is My Heart - 1985) before finding notoriety in the title role of "Gallito Ramírez (Ramírez the Rooster - 1986). That same year, he released his first album "Por Fuera y Por Dentro", marking Vives's foray into his true passion, music.

Despite Vives's newfound fame as an actor to coincide with his musical aspirations, his recordings could not match fellow established crooners in the same genre. His debut and his second release "No Podrás Escapar de Mí", were lost in the shuffle in a market that included superstars such as Julio Iglesias and Juan Gabriel. Although his acting overshadowed any album recordings, Vives would continue, undaunted, with his subsequent release in the summer of 1989, a year that would see further fame and exposure in Carlos's rise to popularity.

On June 6, 1989, "Al Centro de la Ciudad" (To Downtown), was released, coinciding with one of the busiest years in Vives's acting career. Along with success in two starring roles, "La Conciencia de Lucía" (The Conscience of Lucía) and "L.P. – Loca Pasión" (C.P. – Crazy Passion), Vives would find fame in Puerto Rico, meeting his second wife (and mother to his two children) actress Hermelinda Gómez. Success outside Colombia would mark the first step Vives's burgeoning music career as well.

Containing nine tracks, (one of which "Me Estoy Muriendo de Amor" (I'm Dying of Love), was a re-recording from Por Fuera y Por Dentro), the album was mostly written by producer Pablo Manavello and Vives himself. The album differed little from Vives's prior releases, with a touch of rock influence. Like its predecessors, the songs are romantic ballads with a noticeable 80's production; drum machines, overdubbed guitars, and plenty of synthesizer. Starting with the opening track, "Aventurera" (The Adventurer), the song, which shares the same name from the Puerto Rican production Vives starred in, was given extensive play on both radio and television. Other notable songs include "Te Extrañare (Missing You), and the Ricardo Montaner-penned "Casi Un Hechizo" (It was a Spell), which later became a salsa hit for Jerry Rivera . The album closes with an original Vives acoustic track "Cancion de Amor Eterno" (Song of Eternal Love), the only variation from the album's synth-sound.

Though the album would contain no major hits, it would be his first international crossover record. What's more, Vives's acting career outside Colombia would pay off; the title track off of his No Podrás Escapar de Mí album would make a belated chart entry at #30 on the Billboard Hot Latin Charts, marking Vives's first hit single. Aside from early chart success, Al Centro de la Ciudad gave Vives his first bit of musical recognition, the Coca-Cola sponsored Aires Awards.

Fans of Vives's breakout success with La Provincia will find Carlos's earlier albums a complete departure from the dance-oriented vallento of later releases. In two years-time, Vives would reach the zenith of his acting career with Escalona, and would release his first vallenato-recordings with the show's accompanying soundtracks. Due to the breakthrough of Vives's Clásicos de la Provincia, Sony re-released Al Centro de la Ciudad in 1997 (the only of Vives's first three albums to gain re-distribution), though it has now discontinued. However, Al Centro de la Ciudad along with the prior No Podrás Escapar de Mí are still available in compilations such as 20 De Colección, which contain this entire album.

== Track listing ==
Standard Track Listing
No.	Title	Writer(s)	Length
1.	"Aventurera"	Carlos Vives	4:20
2.	"Te Extrañare"	Pablo Manavello	4:20
3.	"Por Ti Me Casare"	Eros Ramazzotti	4:02
4.	"Me Estoy Muriendo De Amor"	Fernando Garavito	3:47
5.	"Casi Un Hechizo"	Ricardo Montaner, Pablo Manavello	3:18
6.	"Tonta Audaz"	Pablo Manavello	3:49
7.	"Simplemente Un Corazón"	Pablo Manavello	4:02
8.	"Al Centro De La Ciudad"	Carlos Vives	3:55
9.	"Canción de Amor Eterno"	Carlos Vives	1:51
