= Luna Nueva (song) =

Single by Carlos Vives

from the album Déjame Entrar
- Released: January 7, 2002
- Recorded: February – June 2001
- Studio: The Club House; (Cooper City, Florida); Crescent Moon Studios; The Hit Factory Critiera; The Warehouse Studio; (Miami, Florida)
- Genre: Son corrido
- Length: 3:36
- Label: EMI
- Songwriters: Martín Madera; Carlos Vives
- Producers: Emilio Estefan, Jr.; Sebastián Krys

Carlos Vives singles chronology
"Déjame Entrar" (2001)	"Luna Nueva" (2002)	"Carito" (2002)

"Luna Nueva" (transl. "New Moon") is a song released by Colombian recording artist Carlos Vives as the second single from his fifth major studio album Déjame Entrar (2001) on January 7, 2002 (see 2002 in music). The song was written by Martín Madera and Vives, and produced by Emilio Estefan, Jr. and Sebastián Krys and became Vives' third number-one hit in the Billboard Hot Latin Songs chart following "Fruta Fresca" and "Déjame Entrar".

== Critical reception ==
While reviewing the parent album, Leila Cobo of Billboard magazine, referred to the musical genre of the song as a Son corrido. Vives earned the ASCAP award for the song and other two singles from Déjame Entrar, the title track and "Carito".

== Chart performance ==
The song debuted in the Billboard Top Latin Songs chart (formerly Hot Latin Tracks) chart at number 45 the week of February 23, 2002, climbing to the top ten three weeks later. "Luna Nueva" peaked at number-one on March 23, 2002, replacing "Flor Sin Retoño" by fellow Colombian singer Charlie Zaa and being succeeded by "Quítame Ese Hombre" by Mexican performer Pilar Montenegro, the following week.

== Charts ==
=== Weekly charts ===
Chart (2002)	Peak position
US Bubbling Under Hot 100 Singles	14
US Hot Latin Songs (Billboard)	1
US Latin Pop Airplay (Billboard)	4
US Tropical Airplay (Billboard)	1

=== Year-end charts ===
Chart (2002)	Peak position
US Latin Tropical Airplay (Billboard)	19

== See also ==
- List of number-one Billboard Hot Latin Tracks of 2002
- List of number-one Billboard Latin Tropical Airplay of 2002
