= La Tierra del Olvido (song) =

1995 song by Carlos Vives

- The caption is taken from a poem by the Kogi people. It translates: "The sea existed first. Everything was dark. There was no sun, no moon. There were no people, no animals, no plants, only the sea, everywhere. The sea was the Mother".

Single by Carlos Vives

from the album La Tierra del Olvido
- Released: June 12, 1995
- Studio: Criteria Recording (Miami, Florida); Estudio Audiovision (Bogotá, Colombia)
- Genre: Neo-vallenato
- Length: 4:25
- Label: Sonolux
- Songwriters: Carlos Vives; Iván Benavides
- Producers: Carlos Vives; Richard Blair

Carlos Vives singles chronology
"Compae Chipuco" (1995)	"La Tierra del Olvido" (1995)	"Pa' Mayte" (1995)

Music video
- "La Tierra del Olvido" on YouTube

"La Tierra del Olvido" ("The Land of the Forgotten") is a song by Colombian singer Carlos Vives from his seventh studio album of the same name (1995). The song was written by Iván Benavides and Vives, who handled production alongside Richard Blair. It was released as the lead single from the album in 1995. The song is a neo-vallenato number that utilizes the folk guitar and accordion, on which Vives longs for his homeland. The song received positive reactions from three music critics, being found as one of the album's catchiest tunes by them. It was a recipient at the ASCAP Latin Awards in 1996.

Commercially, the song peaked at number five on the Hot Latin Songs chart and number one on the Latin Pop Airplay chart in the United States. A music video for the song was filmed in Colombia in which the band performs at Sierra Nevada de Santa Marta mountain range while also depicting a love story with a couple; it was nominated for Video of the Year at the 1996 Lo Nuestro Awards. In 2015, Vives re-recorded "La Tierra del Olvido" with several fellow Colombian acts. Its music video features the musicians performing the song in various locations of Colombia and further received a nomination for Video of the Year at the 2016 Lo Nuestro Awards.

== Background and composition ==
In 1993, Vives released his sixth studio album Clasicos de la Provincia, a collection of vallenato covers performed by the artist. The album was a modern pop take on the genre, which helped revitalize its popularity and sold over 2.5 million copies. Following the album's release, Vives and his band La Provincia spent weeks in a farm conceptualizing music for Vives' next project.. The result was La Tierra del Olvido, which blends Colombian folk music with contemporary music. The title track was written by Iván Benavides and Vives, who handled production alongside Richard Blair. Benavides commented that the song was "the result of a creative laboratory that allowed us to create a powerful concept, in which the local culture dialogued with the world". Vives remarked it "was a moment to understand that we could have global hits without losing our local connection".

Musically, "La Tierra de Olvido" is a neo-vallenato song that utilizes the folk guitar and accordion. According to the Miami Herald writer Fernando Gonzalez, the track sounds "closer to nuevo tango than vallenato". In her book, Musical ImagiNation: U.S-Colombian Identity and the Latin Music Boom (2010), Maria Elena Cepeda wrote that the song's lyrics are allegedly about a "patient ode to a far-away lover" and that it "narrates the pain and longing provoked by distance". However, Cepeda noted that when read as a homage to Colombia, it references the country's culture. Similarly, the Los Angeles Times editor Agustin Garza interpreted the song's meaning as an "aching nostalgia for his homeland".

== Promotion and reception ==
The song was released as the album's lead single by Sonolux Records in 1995. The music video for "La Tierra del Olvido" was filmed in at the Tayrona National Natural Park in Santa Marta, Colombia and directed by Germano Saracco. It was filmed with a 35 mm movie camera and digitally remastered in 2015. Billboard's Leila Cobo regarded the video as a "love letter to Vives' Colombia, beautifully depicted via a love story set in some of the country's most gorgeous vistas". The video depicts Vives and his band performing the song at the Sierra Nevada de Santa Marta mountain range as well as a couple "synthesizing the feeling of a wounded country and at the same time hopeful in better times". Jose Vasquez of La Mezcla felt that it is "an emblematic audiovisual work from the 90s era in Colombia". At the 8th Annual Lo Nuestro Awards in 1996, it was nominated Video of the Year, but lost to "Te Extraño, Te Olvido, Te Amo" by Ricky Martin. Vives performed "La Tierra del Olvido" live at the Radio City Music Hall in 1995 and the Universal Amphitheatre in 2002. Vives opened the 2020 Premios Nuestra Tierra awards ceremony, where he performed an interpretation of the song with Fonseca, Sebastián Yatra, Camilo, Andrés Cepeda, and Goyo. A live version of the track was recorded for Vives' album Más + Corazón Profundo Tour: En Vivo Desde la Bahiá de Santa Marta (2015).

Parry Gettelman of the Orlando Sentinel "complimented the song as "definitely one of the most hummable songs of the year". The New York Daily News critic Mary Talbot cited "Pa' Mayte" and "La Tierra del Olvido" as La Tierra del Olvido's "two infectious danceable Afro-Colombian numbers". Likewise, an editor for RPM magazine listed the latter of the two as one of the songs from the album that "seamlessly consolidate influences and innovation without losing the crucial campfire feel". The track was recognized as one of the best-performing songs of the year at the 1996 ASCAP Latin Awards. In the United States, the song peaked at numbers five and eight on the Billboard Hot Latin Songs and Tropical Airplay charts, respectively; it also reached the top of the Latin Pop Airplay chart.

== 2015 re-recording ==
20 years later, Vives re-recorded "La Tierra del Olvido" with eight Colombian musicians. The acts include Maluma, Fanny Lu, Fonseca, "El Cholo" Valderrama, Herencia de Timbiqui, Andrea Echeverri, and Coral Group. This version was included as a bonus track for Más + Corazón Profundo Tour: En Vivo Desde la Bahiá de Santa Marta. The music video for the song's 2015 version was produced by ProColombia and premiered at the Expo 2015 in Milan, Italy. It features the musicians performing the song in various locations of Colombia including Bogotá, the Amazon River, Valle del Cauca, and San Andrés. It received over two million views within two days of its release on YouTube and was also nominated for Video of the Year at the 28th Annual Lo Nuestro Awards in 2016.

== Charts ==
Chart performance for "La Tierra del Olvido"
Chart (1995)	Peak position
US Hot Latin Songs (Billboard)	5
US Latin Pop Airplay (Billboard)	1
US Tropical Airplay (Billboard)	8

== Certifications ==
Certifications for "La Tierra del Olvido"
Region	Certification	Certified units/sales
United States (RIAA)	2× Platinum (Latin)	120,000^{‡}
^{‡} Sales+streaming figures based on certification alone.

== See also ==
- List of Billboard Latin Pop Airplay number ones of 1994 and 1995
