= La Cartera =

Single by Carlos Vives

from the album El Amor de Mi Tierra
- Released: 2000
- Genre: Tropipop
- Length: 3:19
- Label: EMI Latin
- Songwriters: Carlos Vives; Andres Castro

Carlos Vives singles chronology
"19 de Noviembre" (2000)	"La Cartera" (2000)	"Déjame Entrar" (2001)

"La Cartera" ("The Wallet") is a song performed by Colombian singer-songwriter Carlos Vives, taken from his seventh studio album El Amor de Mi Tierra (1999). The song was written by Vives and Andres Castro. It was released in 2000 on EMI Latin as the fourth and final single from the record.

== Charts ==
Chart (2000)	Peak position
US Tropical Airplay (Billboard)	39
