= 19 de Noviembre =

Single by Carlos Vives

from the album El Amor de Mi Tierra
- Released: 2000
- Genre: Latin pop
- Length: 4:37
- Label: EMI Latin
- Songwriters: Carlos Vives; Angie Chirino; Emilio Estefan

Carlos Vives singles chronology
"Tu Amor Eterno" (2000)	"19 de Noviembre" (2000)	"La Cartera" (2000)

"19 de Noviembre" (transl. "19th of November") is a song performed by Colombian singer-songwriter Olvidemonos for his seventh studio album El Amor de Mi Tierra (1999). It was written by the singer, Emilio Estefan and Angie Chirino. EMI Latin released the song as the third single from the record.

== Charts ==
Chart (2000)	Peak position
US Latin Pop Airplay (Billboard)	40
US Tropical Airplay (Billboard)	33
