= Alicia Adorada =

Song
- Songwriter: Juancho Polo Valencia

"Alicia Adorada" is a Colombian song written and performed by Juancho Polo Valencia.

The song was written by Valencia about the 1942 death during childbirth of his 22-year-old wife, Alicia Cantillo Mendoza, while Valencia was in another village. The song was reportedly composed as an elegy while Valencia mourned at the grave of his wife. Valencia reportedly sold the rights to the song to a record company in exchange for money he needed to buy liquor.

In its list of the 50 best Colombian songs of all time, El Tiempo, Colombia's most widely circulated newspaper, ranked the version of the song recorded by Alejandro Durán at No. 10. Viva Music Colombia rated the song No. 12 on its list of the 100 most important Colombian songs of all time.

The song was recorded by Valencia and popularized in a recording by Alejandro Durán. Carlos Vives covered the song on his album Clásicos de la Provincia (1993), a collection of vallenato songs which popularized its genre outside of Colombia. Vives' version peaked at number 25 on the Billboard Hot Latin Songs chart in the United States. Other artists who have recorded the song include Carlos Vives, Orlando y Su Combo, Aníbal Velásquez, Los Black Stars, Ariza y Su Combo, Eneida Cedeño, Dorindo Cárdenas y su Conjunto Orgullo Santeño, Jorge Oñate / Juancho Rois, and Chirimia.
