= Robarte un Beso =

Single by Carlos Vives and Sebastián Yatra

from the album Vives
- Language: Spanish
- English title: "Steal a Kiss from You"
- Released: 28 July 2017
- Length: 3:14
- Label: Sony Latin
- Songwriters: Carlos Vives; Sebastián Yatra; Mauricio Rengifo; Andres Torres
- Producers: Mauricio Rengifo; Andres Torres

Carlos Vives singles chronology
"Al Filo de Tu Amor" (2017)	"Robarte un Beso" (2017)	"Nuestro Secreto" (2018)

Sebastián Yatra singles chronology
"Edge of the Night" (2017)	"Robarte un Beso" (2017)	"Suena El Dembow" (2017)

Music video
- "Robarte un Beso" on YouTube

"Robarte un Beso" (transl. Steal a Kiss from You) is a song by Colombian singers Carlos Vives and Sebastián Yatra from Vives' fifteenth studio album, Vives (2017). It was written by the two singers, and producers Mauricio Rengifo and Andres Torres. Regarding the track, Yatra said, "'Robarte un Beso' is a song that we did inspired by love, regaining, falling in love, it's never too late to tell that person we have next to us how much we love them."

The song was a commercial and critical success, reaching the top of the charts in several countries and earned praise for its catchy melody and upbeat energy. It was nominated for the Song of the Year at the 2018 Latin Grammy Awards.

== Music video ==
The music video was directed by Venezuelan director Daniel Duran. As of September 2025, the song's music video has over 1.8 billion views on YouTube.

== Charts ==
=== Weekly charts ===
Chart (2017–18)	Peak position
Chile (Monitor Latino)	6
Colombia (Monitor Latino)	1
Colombia (National-Report)	1
Dominican Republic (Monitor Latino)	11
El Salvador (Monitor Latino)	2
Mexico Airplay (Billboard)	3
Spain (Promusicae)	16
US Bubbling Under Hot 100 (Billboard)	21
US Hot Latin Songs (Billboard)	13
US Latin Airplay (Billboard)	1
US Latin Pop Airplay (Billboard)	4
Venezuela (Monitor Latino)	1

=== Year-end charts ===
Chart (2017)	Position
Spain (PROMUSICAE)	64
US Hot Latin Songs (Billboard)	53
Chart (2018)	Position
US Hot Latin Songs (Billboard)	62

== Certifications ==
Region	Certification	Certified units/sales
Italy (FIMI)	Gold	25,000^{‡}
Mexico (AMPROFON)	Diamond+4× Platinum+Gold	570,000^{‡}
Portugal (AFP)	Gold	5,000^{‡}
Spain (Promusicae)	4× Platinum	240,000^{‡}
United States (RIAA)	3× Diamond (Latin)	1,800,000^{‡}
^{‡} Sales+streaming figures based on certification alone.

== See also ==
- List of Billboard number-one Latin songs of 2018
