= 20 De Colección =

20 De Colección may refer to:

- 20 De Colección (Carlos Vives album), 1994
- 20 De Colección (Yolandita Monge album), 1993
- 20 De Colección, compilation album Mocedades
- 20 De Colección, compilation album Leo Dan
- 20 De Colección, compilation album Lorenzo de Monteclaro
- 20 De Colección, compilation album Tania Libertad
