= The Low Tone Club =

Colombian television series

- Spanish: El club de los graves
- Genre: Comedy drama; Musical
- Directed by: Jorge Navas
- Starring: Cast of The Low Tone Club
- Opening theme: Tumbando Muros performed by Carlos Vives and Cast of The Low Tone Club
- Composer: Carlos Vives
- Country of origin: Colombia
- Original language: Spanish

Production
- Production locations: Bogotá, Colombia
- Running time: 30 minutes
- Production company: TeleColombia

Original release
- Network: Disney+
- Release: February 22, 2023

The Low Tone Club (Spanish: El club de los graves) is a Colombian comedy-drama television series for children and adolescents produced by TeleColombia for the Walt Disney Company. The series premiered on February 22, 2023 on Disney+.

== Plot ==
Amaranto Molina, an unconventional music teacher, begins teaching at a music school where only students who meet the ideal of commercial success are promoted. Each year, the school's principal, Eduardo Kramer, selects five students who are nicknamed the "High Tones" and become part of the school's prestigious teen band. Molina, on the other hand, is in charge of the so-called "Low Tones," a group of students whose talents do not meet the school's standards. The headstrong teacher and the "Low Tones" embark on a musical journey in which the teacher's unconventional methods help heal wounds and inspire each of them to express their unique talents. Along the way, the students learn more about Mr. Molina and encounter their teacher's mysterious past, which he always tries to hide.

== Cast ==
- Carlos Vives as Amaranto Molina
- Julián Arango as Eduardo Kramer
- Catalina Polo as Martina
- María Fernanda Marín as Lala
- Manuela Duque as Roxana
- Salomé Camargo as Cami
- Elena Vives as Amalia
- Brainer Gamboa as Romario
- Kevin Bury as Pa-Pi-Yón
- Gregorio Umaña as Raphaelo
- Pitizion as KJ
- Juan Manuel Lenis as Peter
- Juan Camilo González as Dardo
- Juanse Diez as Pablo
- Sharik Abusaid as Lina
- Melanie Dell'Olmo as Sara
- Juan Diego Panadero as Panchito
- Giseth Mariano as Minerva
- Deisy Mariano as Mariana
- Zoila Mariano as Mona
- Luis Fernando Salas as Ocampo

== Episodes ==
No.	Title	Directed by	Written by	Original release date
1	"Natural Selection"	Unknown	Unknown	February 22, 2023
2	"Breaking Walls"	Unknown	Unknown	February 22, 2023
3	"The Piano in the Jungle"	Unknown	Unknown	February 22, 2023
4	"The Secret Garden"	Unknown	Unknown	February 22, 2023
5	"Pulse"	Unknown	Unknown	February 22, 2023
6	"Music Goes up"	Unknown	Unknown	February 22, 2023
7	"Like Father..."	Unknown	Unknown	February 22, 2023
8	"What you Can't see"	Unknown	Unknown	February 22, 2023
9	"Just an Illusion"	Unknown	Unknown	February 22, 2023
10	"No Costume"	Unknown	Unknown	February 22, 2023
