= Tu Amor Eterno =

Single by Carlos Vives

from the album El Amor de Mi Tierra
- Released: 2000
- Genre: Tropipop
- Length: 3:06
- Label: EMI Latin
- Songwriters: Carlos Vives; Martin Madera

Carlos Vives singles chronology
"Fruta Fresca" (1999)	"Tu Amor Eterno" (2000)	"19 de Noviembre" (2000)

"Tu Amor Eterno" (transl. "Your Eternal Love") is a song performed by Colombian singer Carlos Vives, released as the second single from his seventh studio album El Amor de Mi Tierra, in 2000. The song was written by Carlos Vives and Martin Madera.

== Charts ==
Chart (2000)	Peak position
US Hot Latin Songs (Billboard)	29
US Latin Pop Airplay (Billboard)	19
US Tropical Airplay (Billboard)	11
