= La gota fría =

1938 vallenato song by Emiliano Zuleta

"La gota fría" (Spanish for 'The Cold Drop') is a 1938 Colombian vallenato song, composed by Emiliano Zuleta. It has been proposed as an unofficial Colombian anthem. The song emerged from a musical controversy with Lorenzo Morales. Many artists had covered the song include Carlos Vives, Grupo Niche, Ray Conniff, Gran Pachanga, Los Joao, La Sonora Dinamita, Julio Iglesias, Tulio Zuloaga, and Alfredo Gutiérrez. The title of the song alludes metaphorically to the weather phenomenon, in which a cold front clashes with warm air, producing heavy storms and torrential rains; the cold drop is occasionally apparent near the Sierra Nevada de Santa Marta.

== Lyrics and theme ==
The lyrics, based on an actual event, are narrated in the first person and deal with a past impromptu vallenato accordion competition between the narrator and his rival, Lorenzo Morales in the town of Urumita, gloating that the latter fled in anger the following morning. He explains that he (the narrator) is a more meticulous music writer, while Morales mostly freestyles. The narrator argues that Morales is an uneducated man and the competition devolves to mutual swearing and name-calling; he states that he is not above ultimately coming to blows with Morales, but that he is the better man and doesn't let himself get provoked. When the two are jamming together with the accordion, Morales is increasingly unable to keep up with the narrator and begins to get nervous, shedding cold sweat just like the title of the song; Morales ultimately makes a mistake and loses.

== Carlos Vives version ==
"La gota fría"

Single by Carlos Vives

from the album Clásicos de la Provincia
- Released: 1993
- Genre: Vallenato
- Length: 3:33
- Label: Polygram
- Songwriter: Emiliano Zuleta
- Producer: Eduardo de Narvae

Carlos Vives singles chronology
"No Podrás Escapar de Mi" (1989)	"La gota fría" (1993)	"Alicia Adorada" (1994)

In 1994, Colombian vallenato performer Carlos Vives covered the song on his album, Clásicos de la Provincia. The song became a top-ten hit on the on Billboard Hot Latin Tracks chart and peaked at number-six. The song received a Lo Nuestro award for "Tropical Song of the Year". It is recognized as one of Carlos Vives's signature songs.

=== Background and composition ===
Before Clásicos de la Provincia, Vives was not considered a famous Colombian singer on the international stage. He began his career as a soap opera star in such telenovelas. Then tried his hand in a dual career as both television star and romantic balladeer. While he gained domestic attention through his first few albums in the late 1980s, his synthpop style did little to differentiate himself from other musical artists of the era. It took a few years for Vives to find inspiration out of the limelight in Bogotá and back to his roots in Santa Marta.

In 1991, when Carlos was approached to play the part of Rafael Escalona in the biographical film Escalona (1991), it would not only be a star-turning role for the rising actor, but the beginning of Carlos's musical breakthrough. Playing the famous musician, Carlos used his own musical talents to reinterpret Escalona's music, embedded in the traditional Colombian style of music known as Vallenato. With vallenato being the musical style of Colombia's northern coast, the location of Carlos's Santa Marta birthplace, Vives found success embracing his hometown roots. While vallenato was a musical style that had slowly lost popularity with Colombia's younger generation, Escalona would inspire Carlos to fuse the vallenato with modern rock, a sound that would break Carlos not only in his own Colombian homeland, but the entire Latin American music market.

With Carlos's backing band, La Provincia, Carlos took a cue from his successful interpretations of Rafael Escalona, and decided to delve deeper into the famous artists of Colombia's vallenato past. The result would be Carlos's first true breakthrough hit Clásicos de la Provincia, in 1993 (1994 internationally). As the title implies, the album consists of Colombia's vallenato classics, not only popular during its time, but in a new rock style, nearly turning the songs into new compositions. For example, the album opener "La gota fria", when compared to the original by Emiliano Zuleta, sounds like two distinct songs, if one were to ignore song lyrics.

=== Reception ===
Upon its release, "La gota fría" received generally favorable reviews from music critics, who recognized it as one of the best tracks from Clásicos de la Provincia. Carlos Quintana of About.com wrote about the song that "this song took Colombia, and later the world, by storm. The feeling inside of it represents in a perfect way the festive spirit of Colombian people", and named it as ideal track for any Latin party. Also was placed it among his personal list of the Best Vallenatos in History, ranking the first place in a top ten. Janet Rosen from Allmusic praised the song because is different between the other song of the album and expressed "a witty tune that was a major hit for Vives", going on to select the song as one of the best tracks of the album.

"La gota fría" became Vives's first record to attain commercial success. The song peaked at numbers 6 and 14 on the Billboard Hot Latin Songs and Latin Pop Songs component charts. The song won for Tropical Song of the Year at the 1995 Lo Nuestro Awards. In Chile the song was certified Platinum for selling over 25,000 copies.

=== Music video ===
An image of Carlos Vives in the music video for "La gota fría".

The music video for "La gota fría" was shot in the Romelio Martínez Stadium in Barranquilla, and Pescaíto (a popular neighborhood of his native Santa Marta), the two locations are in Colombia. On December 7, 1993, Vives offered a concert in Barranquilla. The event was very special because the music video for "La gota fría" was going to be filmed. They had many film cameras, dollies and clapperboards (with the participation of group of video from RCN TV). At 4:00 AM the next day, La Provincia and Carlos Vives, left Barranquilla because they needed to shoot some scenes of the music video in Santa Marta. The video of the song starts with Carlos singing live with La Provincia, during the video show scenes of the band members playing their instruments. There are other scenes that show the public and other that shows Carlos Vives playing football on the beach, a drop falling in the water, a cactus and other images.

=== Track listings ===
12" maxi-single

1. "La gota fría"

CD Maxi Single

1. "La gota fría"
2. "Alicia adorada"
3. "Matilde Lina"
4. "Honda herida"

=== Charts ===
==== Weekly charts ====
Chart (1994)	Peak position
US Hot Latin Songs (Billboard)	6
US Latin Pop Airplay (Billboard)	14

==== Year-end charts ====
Chart (1994)	Peak position
US Latin Songs (Billboard)	36

=== Certifications ===
Region	Certification	Certified units/sales
Chile (IFPI)	Platinum	25,000
United States (RIAA)	3× Platinum (Latin)	180,000^{‡}
^{‡} Sales+streaming figures based on certification alone.
