= Pa' Mayte =

Single by Carlos Vives

from the album La Tierra del Olvido
- Language: Spanish
- English title: "For Mayte"
- Released: October 9, 1995
- Recorded: 1995
- Genre: Latin pop; champeta
- Length: 3:06
- Label: PolyGram
- Songwriters: Carlos Vives; Ernesto Ocampo; Ivan Benavides

Carlos Vives singles chronology
"La Tierra del Olvido" (1995)	"Pa' Mayte" (1995)	"Rosa" (1996)

"Pa' Mayte" (English: "For Mayte") is a song by Colombian singer Carlos Vives, released as the second single from his fifth studio album La Tierra del Olvido in 1995. The song was written by Carlos Vives, Ivan Benavides and Ernesto Ocampo.

== Track listing ==
US CD

1. "Pa' Mayte" (Album Version) - 3:06
2. "Pa' Mayte" (7 Inch Mix Version) - 3:04
3. "Pa' Mayte" (TV Mix Version) - 3:04
4. "Pa' Mayte" (Instrumental Version) - 3:04
5. "Pa' Mayte" (Extended Version) - 6:30
6. "Pa' Mayte" (Dub Mix Version) - 4:50

Mexican CD

1. "Pa' Mayte" (Album Version) - 3:06
2. "Pa' Mayte" (7 Inch Mix Version) - 3:09
3. "Pa' Mayte" (7 Inch TV Mix Version) - 3:06
4. "Pa' Mayte" (12 Inch Mix) - 6:30
5. "Pa' Mayte" (Dub Mix Version) - 4:50

== Charts ==
Chart (1995)	Peak position
US Hot Latin Songs (Billboard)	12
US Latin Pop Airplay (Billboard)	5
US Tropical Airplay (Billboard)	7

== Certifications ==
Region	Certification	Certified units/sales
United States (RIAA)	Platinum (Latin)	60,000^{‡}
^{‡} Sales+streaming figures based on certification alone.
