= Juancho Polo Valencia =

Colombian accordionist and songwriter

- Born: Juan Manuel Polo Cervantes; 18 September 1918; Cerro de San Antonio, Colombia
- Died: 22 July 1978 (aged 59) Fundación, Colombia
- Genres: vallenato

Juan Manuel Polo Cervantes (Note: In this Spanish name, the first or paternal surname is Polo and the second or maternal family name is Cervantes.) (1918–1978), known as Juancho Polo Valencia, was a Colombian accordionist and songwriter. He was an early pioneer of the Colombian genre of vallenato, and is particularly remembered for his composition "Alicia Adorada", written about the death of his first wife.

== Biography ==
=== Early life ===
Juancho Polo Valencia was born on 18 September 1918 in Cerro San Antonio, Magdalena, Colombia, to Juan Manuel Polo Meriño and María del Rosario Cervantes. He attended primary school in Fundación, and secondary school in Aracataca, the latter a hub of Caribbean literary and musical culture.

=== Music career ===
Although initially taught to play the gaita by his father, Polo preferred the accordion, which he began learning by himself and was later taught by Pacho Rada.

Polo adopted "Valencia" as a second surname because of his admiration for the Colombian poet Guillermo Valencia. He was known for his "slow, cadenced style" and for his poetic and metaphorical lyrics. He was an early pioneer of vallenato, alongside others including Alejo Durán, Luis Enrique Martínez, Abel Antonio Villa, and Emiliano Zuleta Baquero.

Throughout the 1940s, 1950s, and 1960s, he established himself as a sought-after performer at festivals, village celebrations, and cattle ranch gatherings, where the competitive art of the piqueria—musical duels between juglares—was a central feature. His travels often involved weeks on horseback across rural trails, carrying only his accordion and provisions, exchanging songs for food, lodging, or modest payment.

=== Death ===
Polo died on 22 July 1978 in Fundación, after falling asleep in a hammock following a performance in Aracataca the previous night. He was initially buried in Fundación, but his body was later moved to Santa Rosa de Lima.

== Compositions ==
Polo was widely believed to be illiterate, but in fact he was a keen reader of poetry and of the bible, and would "lock himself in his room for hours and compose songs, writing them down in careful handwriting and with respect for the rules of language." Pastor López said of him in the 1970s: "Juancho Polo Valencia has no teeth, didn't get a school degree, but his singing is a science." (Spanish: Juancho Polo Valencia, no tiene dientes ni tiene muelas, no tuvo grado de escuela pero al cantar es la ciencia.)

=== "Alicia Adorada" ===
Polo's best-known song is "Alicia Adorada". It was written as an expression of grief after his wife Alicia María Cantillo Mendoza died alone while pregnant in the village of Flores de María, where the couple lived, while Polo was away performing.

According to journalist Ernesto McCausland in his program Mundo Costeño, when Cantillo fell gravely ill, Polo set out on horseback for Pivijay to find medicine, travelling along the poor roads of the time on a journey that could take more than three days. Upon his return, he found that Alicia had died and been buried.

Although Polo rarely performed "Alicia Adorada", a version by Alejo Durán became widely known in Colombia; Marcos Fidel Vega Seña called Durán's version "the most successful and grandiose lament in accordion music".

=== Other works ===
Other notable compositions by Polo include "Sí, Sí, Sí", "El Paseo de Concordia", "Lucero Espiritual", "La Muerte de Alfredo Gutiérrez", "Niña Mane", "El Pájaro Carpintero", "El Provincianito", and "La Muerte Es La Que Puede". Polo's song "Jesús Cristo Caminando con San Juan" is his retelling of the baptism of Christ. He released 21 LPs between 1971 and 1978 on various Colombian record labels.
