= Vives (album) =

Studio album by Carlos Vives
- Released: November 10, 2017
- Genres: Vallenato; Reggaeton; Tropipop
- Length: 60:57
- Label: Sony Music Latin
- Producers: Carlos Vives; Andrés Castro

Carlos Vives chronology
Más + Corazón Profundo (2014)	Vives (2017)	Cumbiana (2020)

Singles from Vives
- 1. "La Bicicleta" Released: May 27, 2016; 2. "Al Filo de tu Amor" Released: January 23, 2017; 3. "Robarte un Beso" Released: July 28, 2017; 4. "Nuestro Secreto" Released: February 8, 2018

Vives is the fifteenth studio album by Colombian singer Carlos Vives, released on November 10, 2017, through Sony Music Latin. The album was produced by Vives alongside Andrés Castro and features collaborations with singers such as Sebastián Yatra, Shakira, Thalía and Cynthia Montaño, among others.

At the 19th Annual Latin Grammy Awards, the album won Best Contemporary Tropical Album, the fourth time Vives had won the category, while the song "Robarte un Beso" was nominated for Song of the Year. Additionally, the song "La Bicicleta" won both Record of the Year and Song of the Year two years prior at the 17th Annual Latin Grammy Awards.

The album also received nominations for Best Latin Pop Album at the 61st Annual Grammy Awards and for Tropical Album of the Year at the 2018 Billboard Latin Music Awards.

== Singles ==
The song "La Bicicleta" was released as the album's first single on May 27, 2016. The song was commercially successful peaking at number two in the Hot Latin Songs and at 95 in the Billboard Hot 100 chart, being the first and only entry to the latter chart by Vives. The single was followed by "Al Filo de Tu Amor" on January 23, 2017, a remix for the song with Puerto Rican artist Wisin was released on March 24, 2017.

The track "Robarte un Beso" with Sebastián Yatra was released as the third single for the album on July 28, 2017, the song was also included in Yatra's debut studio album Mantra.

== Track listing ==
Vives
No.	Title	Writer(s)	Producer(s)	Length
1.	"Hoy Tengo Tiempo"	Carlos Vives	Carlos Vives, Andres Castro	3:12
2.	"El Sofá"	Vives, Castro	Vives, Castro	3:32
3.	"La Preferida"	Vives	Vives, Castro	3:12
4.	"Pescaíto"	Vives, Castro	Vives, Castro	3:09
5.	"La Tierra Prometida"	Vives	Vives, Castro	3:07
6.	"El Sombrero de Alejo"	Carlos Huertas, Vives	Vives, Castro	3:15
7.	"Vivir Contigo"	Huertas, Vives	Vives, Castro	3:41
8.	"Mañana"	Afo Verde, Castro, Vives	Vives, Castro	3:26
9.	"El Orgullo de Mi Patria"	Carlos Ivan Medina, Vives, Castro	Vives, Castro	3:28
10.	"Al Filo de tu Amor"	Vives, Castro	Vives, Castro	3:37
11.	"Nuestro Secreto"	Vives, Castro	Vives, Castro	3:29
12.	"La Bicicleta" (with Shakira)	Vives, Castro, Shakira	Vives, Castro, Shakira, Luis Fernando Ochoa	3:49
13.	"Robarte un Beso" (with Sebastián Yatra)	Andrés Torres, Vives, Mauricio Rengifo, Sebastián Yatra	Rengifo, Torres	3:14
14.	"Todo Me Gusta" (featuring Thalía)	Vives	Vives, Castro	3:49
15.	"Los Niños Olvidados" (featuring Cynthia Montaño)	Vives, Cynthia Montaño	Vives, Castro	4:02
16.	"La Mujer en la Ventana"	Vives	Vives, Castro	3:46
17.	"Monsieur Bigoté" (featuring Elena Vives & Río Grande Music School Chorus)	Vives, Elena Vives, Pedro Vives	Vives, Castro	4:00
18.	"Todos Somos México"	Huertas, Vives	Vives, Castro	3:49
Total length:				60:57

== Charts ==
Chart performance for Vives
Chart (2017)	Peak position
Spanish Albums (Promusicae)	57
US Top Latin Albums (Billboard)	5
US Tropical Albums (Billboard)	2

== Certifications ==
Certifications for Vives
Region	Certification	Certified units/sales
Mexico (AMPROFON)	2× Platinum+Gold	150,000^{‡}
United States (RIAA)	7× Platinum (Latin)	420,000^{‡}
^{‡} Sales+streaming figures based on certification alone.
