= De Colección =

De Colección may refer to:

- De Colección, compilation album by Menudo
- De Colección (Verónica Castro album)
- De Colección, compilation album by Pimpinela
- De Colección, compilation album by José Luis Rodríguez (singer)
- De Colección, compilation album by Manolo Galván
- De Colección, compilation album by Eduardo Falú
