= Cumbiana =

Studio album by Carlos Vives
- Released: May 22, 2020
- Recorded: 2020
- Genres: Latin pop; Reggaeton; Tropipop
- Length: 38:00
- Label: Sony Music Latin
- Producers: Carlos Vives; Andrés Leal; Martin Velilla

Carlos Vives chronology
Vives (2017)	Cumbiana (2020)	Cumbiana II (2022)

Singles from Cumbiana
- 1. "No Te Vayas" Released: March 5, 2020; 2. "For Sale" Released: May 19, 2020; 3. "Cumbiana" Released: October 15, 2020

Cumbiana is the sixteenth studio album by Colombian singer Carlos Vives, released on May 22, 2020, through Sony Music Latin. It was produced by Carlos Vives, Andrés Leal and Martin Velilla, and features collaborations with Jessie Reyez, Alejandro Sanz, Ziggy Marley, Elkin Robinson and Rubén Blades.

The album was accompanied by a documentary film titled El Mundo Perdido de Cumbiana, released on July 20, 2020, as well as a book titled Cumbiana, Relatos de un Mundo Perdido, the latter was written by Vives alongside historian Guillermo Barreto and released on December 30, 2020, both projects explore the origins of cumbia following the theme of the album.

At the 21st Annual Latin Grammy Awards, the album was nominated for Album of the Year and won Best Contemporary Tropical Album, being Vives fifth victory in the category, additionally, "For Sale" was nominated for Song of the Year, "Canción para Rubén" won Best Tropical Song and the documentary film won Best Long Form Music Video. The album was also recognized at the Premios Nuestra Tierra of 2021, given to highlight Colombian music, among the eleven nominations that Vives received, the album was nominated for Album of the Year while the title track was nominated for Song of the Year and won Best Folk Song.

== Background ==
The album was recorded in several studios in United States, United Kingdom, Spain and Colombia. It explores the genre of cumbia as well as its history, according to Vives, its a homage to indigenous people from Colombia and its musical richness, he has said that "we have always thought that the joy of our music comes from our African ancestors, but in reality, our indigenous peoples are the ones who have brought that exuberance to Latin music". Namely, the title track is dedicated to the city of Santa Marta in Colombia due to its importance to the music of the country, Vives said that "we have to be grateful to the Ciénaga Grande de Santa Marta, that is the birth of many artists, of our culture". The name for the album is a term created by Vives to refer to the places where the genre originated like Montes de María, the Ciénaga de Lorica and the Sabanas de Bolívar, among others.

== Singles ==
The first single for the album was "No Te Vayas", released on March 5, 2020, while the second single was "For Sale", a collaboration with Spanish singer Alejandro Sanz, released on May 19, 2020. After the release of the album, the title track "Cumbiana" was released as the third single on October 15, 2020. "No Te Vayas" and "Cumbiana" peaked at numbers 2 and 12 at the Tropical Songs chart, respectively, additionally, the latter song was successful in Panamá, debuting at number one and spending five weeks at the top position of the chart.

== Track listing ==
Cumbiana track listing
No.	Title	Writer(s)	Producer(s)	Length
1.	"Hechicera" (featuring Jessie Reyez)	Carlos Vives; Andrés Leal; Jessie Reyez; Martin Velilla	Carlos Vives; Andrés Leal; Martin Velilla	3:36
2.	"No Te Vayas"	Vives	Vives; Leal; Velilla	3:45
3.	"For Sale" (featuring Alejandro Sanz)	Vives; Alejandro Sanchez Pizarro	Vives; Leal; Velilla; Alfonso Perez; Chris Hierro	3:36
4.	"El Hilo" (featuring Ziggy Marley and Elkin Robinson)	Vives; David Ziggy Marley; Elkin Robinson	Vives; Leal; Velilla	3:48
5.	"Canción para Rubén" (featuring Rubén Blades)	Vives; Rubén Blades	Vives; Leal; Velilla	4:10
6.	"Vitamina en Rama"	Vives	Vives; Leal; Velilla	3:32
7.	"Los Consejos del Difunto"	Vives; Leal; Velilla	Vives; Leal; Velilla	3:30
8.	"Rapsodia en La Mayor (para Elena)"	Vives; Leal; Velilla	Vives; Leal; Velilla	4:01
9.	"Cumbiana"	Vives	Vives; Leal; Velilla	3:57
10.	"Zhigonezhi"	Ernesto Ocampo	Vives; Leal; Velilla	4:01
Total length:				38:00

== Charts ==
Weekly chart performance for Cumbiana
Chart (2020)	Peak position
US Latin Pop Albums (Billboard)	9
US Tropical Albums (Billboard)	9
