= Déjame Entrar (Carlos Vives song) =

Single by Carlos Vives

from the album Déjame Entrar
- Released: September 24, 2001
- Recorded: February – June 2001
- Studio: The Club House; (Cooper City, Florida); Crescent Moon Studios; The Hit Factory Critiera; The Warehouse Studio; (Miami, Florida)
- Genre: Vallenato
- Length: 4:00
- Label: EMI
- Songwriters: Martín Madera; Carlos Vives; Andrés Castro
- Producers: Emilio Estefan, Jr.; Sebastián Krys

Carlos Vives singles chronology
"La Cartera" (2000)	"Déjame Entrar" (2001)	"Luna Nueva" (2002)

"Déjame Entrar" (transl. "Let Me In") is a song released by Colombian recording artist Carlos Vives as the first single from his fifth major studio album of the same title in 2001.

== Background and reception ==
The song was written by Martín Madera, Andrés Castro and Carlos Vives, and produced by Emilio Estefan, Jr. and Sebastián Krys and became Vives' second number-one hit in the Billboard Hot Latin Songs chart following "Fruta Fresca" two years prior. At the 3rd Latin Grammy Awards, Vives was the performer with the highest number of nominations, with six. "Déjame Entrar" was nominated for Record, Song of the Year and Best Short Form Music Video, and won for Best Tropical Song.

== Critical reception ==
Diego Bonacich of AllMusic named the song one of the best included on Déjame Entrar. About the songs included on his album, Vives said: "I always have a fusion of rhythms, which I have already hinted on my previous albums. When I make music, I work with cumbia, vallenato, with all the Caribbean rhythms from northern Colombia, it is very difficult to escape the 'trulla', the Puerto-Rican plena, the Cuban son and Dominican merengue, because they are relatives". The singer also mentioned that the song was a vallenato/pop music blend. The track was later included on the compilation album 2002 Latin Grammy Nominees, which peaked at number five in the Billboard Top Latin Albums chart.

== Chart performance ==
The song debuted in the Billboard Top Latin Songs chart (formerly Hot Latin Tracks) chart at number 12 the week of November 3, 2001, Vives' highest debut in the chart at the time, climbing to the top ten the following week. "Déjame Entrar" peaked at number-one on November 24, 2001, four weeks after its debut, the fastest for the singer, replacing "Suerte" by fellow Colombian singer Shakira and being succeeded by "Tantita Pena" by Mexican performer Alejandro Fernández, the following week. The song returned to the top of the chart on December 15, 2001 for another two weeks, before being succeeded by Fernández. By January 19, 2002, "Déjame Entrar" began a third period at the top, to be replaced one week later by Fernández. "Déjame Entrar" also peaked at number-one in the Tropical Airplay Charts and had a dance version released to several American nightclubs. Vives earned an ASCAP award for the song and the following singles from Déjame Entrar: "Luna Nueva" and "Carito".

== Track listing ==
- US "Déjame Entrar" 12' single
1. "Déjame Entrar" (club mix)
2. "Déjame Entrar" (bonus track)
3. "Déjame Entrar" (dub mix)

== Personnel ==
- Carlos Vives – performer, lyricist, co-producer
- Sebastián Krys – producer, arranger
- Emilio Estefan, Jr. – producer, arranger
- Andrés Castro – co-producer
- Egido Cuadrado – arranger
- Luis "El Papa" Pastor – arranger
- Mayte Montero – arranger
- Pablo Flores – remix producer

== See also ==
- List of number-one Billboard Hot Latin Tracks of 2001
- List of number-one Billboard Hot Latin Tracks of 2002
