= El Amor de Mi Tierra =

Studio album by Carlos Vives
- Released: October 19, 1999
- Genre: Vallenato, Porro, Cumbia, Pop latino
- Length: 45:16
- Label: Sonolux (Colombia); EMI/Virgin Records (worldwide)
- Producer: Emilio Estefan, Jr. Juan Vicente Zambrano; Andrés Castro

Carlos Vives chronology
Tengo Fe (1997)	El Amor de Mi Tierra (1999)	Déjame Entrar (2001)

El Amor de Mi Tierra (The Love of My Land) is the ninth album by Colombian singer/composer Carlos Vives released on October 19, 1999.

== Track listing ==
1. "El Amor de Mi Tierra" (M. Madera) – 3:24
2. "Fruta Fresca" (M. Madera) – 3:53
3. "19 de Noviembre" (C. Vives, E. Estefan, A. Chirino) – 4:37
4. "Tu Amor Eterno" (C. Vives, M. Madera) – 4:03
5. "La Mona" (C. Vives, A. Castro) – 4:06
6. "Volver Al Valle" (C. Vives, E. Cuadrado) – 4:15
7. "Cante" (C. Vives, E. Escaf) – 3:43
8. "La Cartera" (C. Vives, A. Castro) – 3:19
9. "Pitán-Pitán" (C. Vives, A. Castro) – 4:53
10. "La Receta" (C. Vives, J. Zambrano) – 4:39
11. "La Piragua" (José Barros) – 4:24

== Charts ==
=== Weekly charts ===
Chart (1999–2000)	Peak position
US Top Latin Albums (Billboard)	2
US Tropical Albums (Billboard)	2
US Heatseekers Albums (Billboard)	11

=== Year-end charts ===
Chart (2000)	Peak position
Spain (AFYVE)	24

== Sales and certifications ==
Region	Certification	Certified units/sales
Colombia	2× Platinum	
Spain (PROMUSICAE)	3× Platinum	300,000^{^}
United States (RIAA)	2× Platinum (Latin)	200,000^{^}
^{^} Shipments figures based on certification alone.
