= Escalona: Vol. 2 =

Studio album by Carlos Vives
- Released: 1991(Un Canto A La Vida); 1992 (Vol. 2)
- Genre: Vallenato
- Label: Columbia Records; Sony Discos

Carlos Vives chronology
Escalona: Un Canto A La Vida (1991)	Escalona: Vol. 2 (1991)	Clásicos de la Provincia (1993)

Escalona: Vol. 2 is the fifth album by Colombian singer/composer Carlos Vives and companion soundtrack to the telenovela Escalona, released in 1991. The album is a collection of classic tracks from vallenato legend Rafael Escalona, performed by the show's star, singer/composer Carlos Vives. The soundtrack would mark the first collaboration of Carlos and the band La Provincia.

== Track listing ==
Vol. 2

1. "Casa En El Aire" (Rafael Escalona)
2. "Playonero" (Rafael Escalona)
3. "General Dangond" (Rafael Escalona)
4. "Hambre del Liceo" (Rafael Escalona)
5. "Maye" (Rafael Escalona)
6. "Pirata de Loperena" (Rafael Escalona)
7. "Historia" (Rafael Escalona)
8. "Paraguachón" (Rafael Escalona)
9. "Vieja Sara" (Rafael Escalona)
10. "Mala Suerte" (Rafael Escalona)
11. "Chevrolito" (Rafael Escalona)
12. "Despedida" (Rafael Escalona)
13. "Brasilera" (Rafael Escalona)
