= No Podrás Escapar de Mí =

Studio album by Carlos Vives
- Released: June 6, 1987
- Genre: Latin
- Labels: CBS Records International; Columbia Records; Sony Discos
- Producer: Jorge Luis Piloto

Carlos Vives chronology
Por Fuera y Por Dentro (1986)	No Podrás Escapar de Mí (1987)	Al Centro de la Ciudad (1989)

No Podrás Escapar de Mí (English: You Won't Be Able to Escape from Me) is the second album released by Colombian singer/composer Carlos Vives. It was released in 1987, Vives was best known as the star of soap operas at the time of its release. The album contains romantic ballads and Rock music sung in Spanish. Vives embraced Vallenato later in his career. Although the title track reached number 30 in the Billboard Hot Latin Tracks, the album was largely ignored by the public, and is a collector's item for fans.

== Description ==
Released in 1987, "You can't escape me" is a record made near the end of the 1980s. Despite its characteristic hair that adorns the cover of the album, the music is very different from that of Vives did with Clásicos de la Provincia in 1993. Instead where it is known Vives with the sound vallenato, the songs are mixed with the sound of pure pop Latino 80s and Rock in Spanish of the time. While Vives would make her acting career in Puerto Rico and doing what he liked "Music", this album is filled completely with a slower pace, ballads romantic and Rock much like he wanted. Vives, despite his distinctive voice, made a more commercial music attributed the interest of the record Sony Music at the time, allowing the directives and take agreement the album had this label.

Most of the album, written and arranged by the Cuban Jorge Luis Piloto, contains songs like "Tu Y Yo" ("You and I") written by Eros Ramazzotti, Piero Cassano and Adelio Cogliati, "Sin Negativo"("No Negative") of Mario Patino, "Si Es Que Te Vas" ("If you go") of Sergio Villar dealing with love and longing, this was part of the image Vives should be maintained as heartthrob star of soap operas not only in Colombia, but Puerto Rico . Apart from softer ballads, heavy songs like Charly Garcia as "Yo No Quiero Volverme Tan Loco" ("I do not want to become so crazy") with a rocker style to what he Vives and while the song "Quizas Porque" ("Perhaps because") ends with very soft acoustic style driven by sound.

In the back of the album he says this:

"A todos los seres que amaron este proyecto. Algunos en escritorios de papeles, cigarrillos y café. Otros piloteando hábilmente la nave en su cabina de cristal y bluejeans. A todos nosotros los seres de la tierra donde estamos: Santa Marta, Bogotá, San Juan, Miami,... en este disco es nuestro. A mi amiga Nuyorquina Liesa "Little Eva" Dileo de Oncean a Central Park llevando al top la banana. A los actores, a los músicos, a mis amigos de la infancia y a toda mi familia, que mi voz les llegue como un beso en la boca del alma. A Lucia la mujer que nunca conocí y para ti la mujer de las dos flores."

Carlos Vives

Translated into English and is:

"All beings who loved this project in desks Some papers, cigarettes and coffee Other skillfully piloting the ship in his glass booth and bluejeans All of us beings on earth where we are . . . Santa Marta, Bogota, San Juan, Miami, ... in this record is ours. my friend Nuyorquina Liesa "Little Eva " Dileo of Oncean to Central Park leading to the top banana. the actors, musicians, my childhood friends and all my family, my voice reaches them like a kiss on the mouth of the soul. a woman Lucia I never knew you and the wife of the two flowers."

Carlos Vives

Vives was nominated a "Breakthrough Artist" at the 1987 Premios Lo Nuestro and won the "Prize Stereo Tempo" in Puerto Rico (1988) followed by the "Too Much" Awards (Miami, 1988). He also played a set at the "Espectaculares JES" and sang the title track, "Yo No Quiero Volverme Tan Loco", "Quédate Aqui" and "Tu Y Yo".

== Track listing ==
Standard Track Listing
No.	Title	Writer(s)	Length
1.	"No Podrás Escapar de Mí"	Jorge Luis Piloto	3:59
2.	"Sin Negativo"	Mario Patiño	4:20
3.	"Yo No Quiero Volverme Tan Loco"	Charly García	4:21
4.	"Si Es Que Te Vas"	Sergio Villar	4:26
5.	"Tú y Yo"	Eros Ramazzotti, Piero Cassano, Adelio Cogliati	4:20
6.	"Más Que Tu, No Hay Nadie"	Jorge Luis Piloto	3:38
7.	"Quedate Aquí"	Jorge Luis Piloto	4:04
8.	"Amigo"	Jorge Luis Piloto	4:01
9.	"Quizás Porque"	Charly García	2:47

== Charts ==
Chart (1989)	Peak position
US Latin Pop Albums (Billboard)	21
