= Déjame Entrar (album) =

Studio album by Carlos Vives
- Released: November 6, 2001
- Recorded: February – June 2001
- Studios: The Club House (Cooper City, Florida); Crescent Moon Studios; The Hit Factory Critiera; The Warehouse Studio (Miami, Florida)
- Genre: Latin pop · vallenato · cumbia · porro
- Length: 41:04
- Labels: Sonolux (Colombia); EMI Music/Virgin Records (Worldwide)
- Producer: Emilio Estefan, Jr. · Sebastián Krys · Andrés Castro · Carlos Vives

Carlos Vives chronology
El Amor de Mi Tierra (1999)	Déjame Entrar (2001)	El Rock de Mi Pueblo (2004)

Déjame Entrar (Let Me In) is the tenth studio album recorded by Colombian singer-songwriter Carlos Vives. It was released on November 6, 2001 (see 2001 in music). It won the Grammy Award for Best Traditional Tropical Latin Album at the 44th Annual Grammy Awards on February 27, 2002.

== Track listing ==
1. "Déjame entrar" (Andrés Castro, Carlos Vives, Martín Madera) – 3:57
2. "Carito" (Carlos Vives, Egidio Cuadrado) – 3:38
3. "Amor latino" (Carlos Vives, Martín Madera) – 4:10
4. "Luna nueva" (Carlos Vives, Martín Madera) – 3:36
5. "Papadió" (Andrés Castro, Carlos Iván Medina, Carlos Vives) – 3:27
6. "Quiero verte sonreír" (Andrés Castro, Carlos Vives, Carlos Huertas) – 3:18
7. "A las doce menos diez" (Carlos Vives) – 4:01
8. "María Teresa" (Andrés Castro, Emilio Estefan, Carlos Vives) – 3:36
9. "Décimas" (Carlos Vives, Martín Madera) – 3:33
10. "Santa Elegia" (Carlos Vives) – 3:52
11. "Déjame entrar (Bonus track)" (Andrés Castro, Carlos Vives, Martín Madera) – 3:57

== Personnel ==
- Carlos Vives – vocals, choir
- Archie Peña – percussion, conga, drums
- Sebastián Krys – choir
- Mayte Montero – maraca, bagpipes
- Ramón Benítez – bombard
- Egidio Cuadrado – accordion, choir
- Andrés Castro – acoustic guitar, electric guitar, charango, choir
- Carlos Huertas – choir
- Pablo Bernal – drums
- Tedoy Mullet – trombone, trumpet
- Carlos Iván Medina – choir
- Luis Ángel Pastor – double bass, six-string bass
- Paquito Hechavarría – piano
- Martín Madera – choir

=== Technical personnel ===
- Carlos Vives – arranger, producer
- Scott Canto – engineer
- Mike Couzzi – engineer
- Bob Ludwig – mastering
- Sebastián Krys – arranger, producer, engineer
- Kevin Dillon – logistics
- Mayte Montero – arranger
- Lucho Correa – graphic design
- Egidio Cuadrado – arranger
- Andrés Castro – arranger, producer
- David Heuer – engineer
- Javier Garza – engineer
- Steve Menezes – studio coordinator
- José A. Maldonado – logistics
- Trevor Fletcher – studio coordinator
- Luis Ángel Pastor – arranger
- Emilio Estefan Jr. – producer
- Eric Schilling – engineer
- John Thomas II – engineer
- Ron Taylor – engineer

== Charts ==
Chart (2001)	Peak position
US Top Latin Albums (Billboard)	1
US Tropical Albums (Billboard)	1
US Heatseekers Albums (Billboard)	9

== Sales and certifications ==
Region	Certification	Certified units/sales
Colombia	Platinum	40,000
Spain (Promusicae)	Gold	50,000^{^}
United States (RIAA)	2× Platinum (Latin)	200,000^{^}
^{^} Shipments figures based on certification alone.

== See also ==
- List of number-one Billboard Top Latin Albums of 2001
- List of number-one Billboard Tropical Albums from the 2000s
