= Fruta Fresca =

1999 single by Carlos Vives

Single by Carlos Vives

from the album El Amor de Mi Tierra
- Released: 22 August 1999
- Genre: Tropipop; vallenato
- Length: 3:52
- Label: EMI Latin
- Songwriter: Carlos Vives
- Producers: Emilio Estefan; Juan Vicente Zambrano

Carlos Vives singles chronology
"Caballito" (1998)	"Fruta Fresca" (1999)	"Tu Amor Eterno" (2000)

"Fruta Fresca" (transl. "Fresh Fruit") is a vallenato song written and performed by Colombian recording artist Carlos Vives and produced by Emilio Estefan and Juan Vicente Zambrano as the lead single from his studio album El Amor de Mi Tierra (1999). The song incorporates the sound of Latin pop and Colombian vallenato music. In the song, he compares his lover's kisses to fresh fruit. The track was well received by critics who praised the production of the record. "Fruta Fresca" became Vives' first number-one hit on the Billboard Hot Latin Songs chart. It is recognized as one of his signature songs.

It received three Latin Grammy nominations for Record of the Year, Song of the Year and Best Tropical Song and a Lo Nuestro nomination for Tropical Song of the Year. Vives received an American Society of Composers, Authors and Publishers award for Pop/Contemporary Song in 2001 for his composition of the song. In 2003, Brazilian boy band Br'oZ covered the song in the Portuguese language under the title "Prometida" for their album Popstars which peaked at number two on the Brazilian Airplay chart.

== Background and music ==
Carlos Vives "Fruta Fresca" (1999)
A 21 second sample of the song, "Fruta Fresca". The sound incorporates the sounds of Latin pop and vallenato music.

El Amor de Mi Tierra is Carlos Vives's ninth studio album released by EMI Latin on 21 September 1999. The album was produced by Juan Vicente Zambrano and Emilio Estefan.

It contains twelve tracks, ten of which were composed by Vives including "Fruta Fresca". "Fruta Fresca" fuses the sounds of Latin pop and Colombian vallenato music. In the song, he compares his lover's kisses to fresh fruit "which escaped from your mouth and went up to my head".

== Promotion ==
An accompanying music video for the song was released in 1999 which features Vives and a band performing song with various background montages. Vives performed the song at the 12th Lo Nuestro Awards which Magaly Morales of the Sun-Sentinel noted that his performance "sent everybody up on their feet, swinging their hips". The song was included on his El Amor de Mi Tour track listing. He also performed the song at the 1st Latin Grammy Awards ceremony where Joan Anderman of The Boston Globe said that Vives "brought the performances to an upbeat close". He was originally not going to perform at the Latin Grammy Awards due to his illness with pneumonia, but decided to go as he wanted to show "something that was mine and that was my country's".

== Commercial performance ==
"Fruta Fresca" was originally scheduled to be released to radio stations on 17 August 1999, but it was released later in the month because the music video was not finished. The song debuted on the Billboard Hot Latin Tracks chart at number 21 for the week of 21 November 1999, climbing to the top ten two weeks later. "Fruta Fresca" peaked at number-one on 8 January 2000, replacing "Ritmo Total" by Spanish performer Enrique Iglesias and being succeeded by "Te Quiero Mucho" by Mexican band Los Rieleros del Norte, the following week. The song returned to the top of the chart on 22 January 2000 for another two weeks, before being succeeded by Guatemalan singer-songwriter Ricardo Arjona with "Desnuda". By 11 March 2000, "Fruta Fresca" was replaced at the number-one position by "Que Alguien Me Diga" by Gilberto Santa Rosa. "Fruta Fresca" also peaked at number-one on the Billboard Latin Tropical Airplay chart. The song ended 2000 as the third best performing Latin single of the year in the United States. In Spain, the song peaked at number two on the PROMUSICAE singles chart.

== Reception and accolades ==
"Fruta Fresca" was named a "highlight" by Steve Huey of AllMusic on the review of the parent album, and was also described as a "bridge" between tropical and pop music, by Leila Cobo of Billboard magazine, while reviewing the nominees for the Latin Grammy Awards. While reviewing songs that were nominated for Record of the Year at the first Latin Grammy Awards, an editor for the Los Angeles Times declared that "Vives demonstrated to the world that it was possible, after all, to make commercial music without sacrificing the roots of Latin America". On the review of the compilation album The Rhythm, Rosa Yi of the Orlando Sentinel declares that "If there's any rhythm in your body, you will get up and bust a move".

At the 1st Latin Grammy Awards, it received nominations for Record of the Year, Song of the Year and Best Tropical Song, while Vives was a candidate for Male Pop Vocal Performance. The song was also nominated for "Tropical Song of the Year" at the 13th Lo Nuestro Awards. Vives earned the American Society of Composers, Authors and Publishers award for Pop/Contemporary Song in 2001 for "Fruta Fresca". In 2003, Brazilian boy band Br'oZ recorded a cover version of the song in the Portuguese language under the title "Prometida" for their album Popstars. The track peaked at number two on the Brazilian Airplay chart.

== Track listing ==
"Fruta Fresca" + remixes' CD maxi single
No.	Title	Length
1.	"Fruta Fresca"	3:52
2.	"Fruta Fresca" (Pablo Flores club mix)	9:51
3.	"Fruta Fresca" (Pablo Flores mix – radio edit)	4:30
4.	"Fruta Fresca" (Pablo Flores dub mix)	8:15

== Charts ==
=== Weekly charts ===
Chart (1999–2000)	Peak position
Nicaragua (Notimex)	3
Spain (Promusicae)	2
US Bubbling Under Hot 100 (Billboard)	9
US Hot Latin Songs (Billboard)	1
US Latin Pop Airplay (Billboard)	2
US Tropical Airplay (Billboard)	1

=== Year-end charts ===
Chart (2000)	Position
US Latin Songs (Billboard)	3
US Latin Pop Songs (Billboard)	7
US Tropical Songs (Billboard)	3

== See also ==
- List of number-one Billboard Hot Latin Tracks of 2000
- List of number-one Billboard Latin Tropical Airplay of 2000
- Billboard Top Latin Songs Year-End Chart
