= La Tierra del Olvido =

Studio album by Carlos Vives
- Released: July 25, 1995
- Genre: Tropipop, Latin pop, vallenato
- Length: 43:13
- Label: Sonolux (Colombia); Polygram (worldwide)
- Producer: Carlos Vives; Richard Blair; Ernesto Ocampo; Luis Angel Pastor; Iván Benavides; Álvaro Duque (Sonolux); Manuel Riveira (Sonolux)

Carlos Vives chronology
Clásicos de la Provincia (1993)	La Tierra del Olvido (1995)	Tengo Fe (1997)

Singles from La Tierra del Olvido
- 1. "La Tierra del Olvido" Released: June 12, 1995; 2. "Pa' Mayte" Released: October 9, 1995; 3. "Fidelina" Released: February 5, 1996

La Tierra del Olvido (The Forgotten Land) is the seventh album by Colombian singer/composer Carlos Vives. The album was released on July 25, 1995, and contained a split of vallenato covers, as well as Vives' first foray into original compositions in the vallenato style. The album was nominated for a Lo Nuestro Award for Tropical/Salsa Album of the Year. The album consolidated Vives as Colombia's most famous musician at the time of its release.

== Track listing ==
1. "Pa' Mayté" (Andrés Castro, Carlos Iván Medina, Carlos Vives) – 3:07
2. "Fidelina" (Alejo Durán) – 4:22
3. "La Tierra del Olvido" (Vives, Iván Benavides) – 4:25
4. "Zoila" (Toño Fernández) – 4:23
5. "Rosa" (Irene Martínez) – 4:12
6. "Agua" (Benavides, Ernesto Ocampo) – 3:52
7. "La Cachucha Bacana" (Durán) – 4:21
8. "Diosa Coronada" (Leandro Díaz) – 4:14
9. "La Puya Puyá" (Egidio Cuadrado) – 5:00
10. "Ella" (Benavides) – 3:47
11. "Jam en Jukümey" (Benavides, Ocampo, Vives, Mayte Montero, Medina) – 1:30

== Album credits ==
Performance credits

- Carlos Vives – Primary Artist, Director, Vocals
- Egidio Cuadrado – Accordion, Vocals (La Puya Puyá), Backing Vocals
- Carlos Ivan Medina – Background Vocals, Choir, Chorus, Keyboards
- Mayte Montero – Background Vocals, Choir, Chorus, Gaita, Percussion, Vocals
- Luis Angel Pastor – Bass
- Gilbert Martínez – Conga, Marimbas, Marimbula, Percussion
- Pablo Bernal – Drums
- Eder Polo – Guacharaca
- Ernesto "Teto" Ocampo – Guitar, Vocals
- Alfredo Rosado – Tamboura, Timbales

Technical credits

- La Provincia – Arranger
- José Luis Diazgranados – Artwork
- José Rincón – Contributor
- Chris Lawson – Engineer
- Carlos Vives – Graphic Design, Producer
- Jerry Lofaro – Illustrations
- Alfonso Bulla – Logistics
- Iván Benavides – Producer
- Richard Blair – Producer
- Ernesto "Teto" Ocampo – Producer
- Luis Angel Pastor – Producer
- Michael Fuller – Mastering

== Charts and sales ==
=== Weekly charts ===
Chart (1995)	Peak position
U.S. Billboard Hot Heatseekers Albums	29
U.S. Billboard Latin Albums	5
U.S. Billboard Tropical Albums	1

=== Year-end charts ===
Chart (1996)	Position
U.S. Billboard Latin Albums	50
U.S. Billboard Tropical Albums	5

=== Sales ===
Region	Certification	Certified units/sales
Colombia	—	880,000

== See also ==
- List of number-one Billboard Tropical Albums from the 1990s
