= Por Fuera y Por Dentro =

Studio album by Carlos Vives
- Released: June 6, 1986
- Genre: Latin
- Label: FM Discos & Cintas
- Producer: Ricardo Acosta

Carlos Vives chronology
Por Fuera y Por Dentro (1986)	No Podrás Escapar de Mí (1987)

Por Fuera y Por Dentro (Outside and Inside) is the first album released by Colombian singer/composer Carlos Vives. Its release date was June 6, 1986. Vives was best known as the star of television soap operas at the time of its release. The album contains romantic ballads with heavy use of synthesizers, and precedes the era before Vives started singing vallenato, the genre that he has been associated with for the most part of his career. As it was the case with his next early albums, this was not a commercial success, and it's his least known record. Largely ignored by the public, the album is a collector's item for fans, and is a difficult find.

== Description ==
Carlos Vives, one of the greatest artists of Latin America and that revolutionized the modern vallenato, began as a young man struggling in the Latin television star. With soap operas, to be a springboard for Latin American in search of fame, Vives was no exception . In his native Colombia, especially in Santa Marta where he grew up and in Bogota where he studied and raised to be an actor and started his career in a series of shows like " Little Giants " 1983 and "Yours is My Heart " 1985 and before seeking notoriety in the title role of "Gallito Ramirez " in 1986 . That same year, he released his first album Outside and inside, marking the life of Vives and his true passion, music, this album contains songs by Fernando Garavito and other Colombian composers. Before the release of their first album tells the inside cover this argument Vives said, was the following:

"Cuando soñé con grabar este disco no fueron muchos los que se lanzaron a volar conmigo, pero esos pocos fueron suficientes para darme a conocer Por Fuera y Por Dentro.

y es por eso que doy gracias a Dios, y es por eso que hoy doy gracias a fercho, que vive soñando; gracias a josep, que cruzó el atlántico; a ricardo, al mono levy por estar en la batalla, a rubiela por sus tintos y a judith que está esperando. gracias a mis amigos de la calle, a mis hermanos luis, guillo y juanchi que está lejos, y por pensar en el canté con más ganas.

gracias a la mujer que vive en mí y gracias papá y mamá por hacerme cantando."

Carlos Vives

Translated into English, reads:

"When I dreamed of recording this album were not many who took flight with me, but those few were enough to let me know on the outside and inside.

and that is why I thank God, and that is why today I thank fercho, who lives dreaming; to josep, who crossed the Atlantic; to ricardo, the blond levy for being in the battle, rubiela for her black coffee and Judith who is expecting. thanks to my friends in the street, my brothers Luis, guillo and juanchi who is far, and I sang harder thinking of him.

thanks to the woman who lives in me and thanks Mom and Dad for making me singing."

Carlos Vives

== Track listing ==
Standard Track Listing
No.	Title	Writer(s)	Length
1.	"Vuelve"	Fernando Garavito	3:32
2.	"No Vuelvas A Ver Hacia Atrás"	Cristian Vega	3:40
3.	"No Quiero"	Charito Acuña	2:23
4.	"Me Estoy Muriendo de Amor"	Fernando Garavito	3:28
5.	"Robándome la Mente"	Cristian Vega	3:41
6.	"Si Quieres Hacer, El Amor"	Ricardo Acosta	3:00
7.	"No Hay Nada"	Fernando Garavito	3:06
8.	"Por Fuera y Por Dentro"	Fernando Garavito	3:26
9.	"Vuelve A Empezar"	Fernando Garavito	3:57
10.	"Quiero"	Carlos Vives	3:47

== Album credits ==
Performance Credits

- Carlos Vives - Vocals
- Joseph Max Klitfus - Piano & Synthesizer
- Gabriel Rondón - Acoustic Guitar
- Alfonso Rondón - Bass
- Hernando "Henry" Becerra - Electric Guitar
- Wilson Viveros - Drums and percussion
- Eduardo Maya - Trumpet
- Dagoberto García - Clarinet & Saxophone
- Gustavo "El Pantera" García - Trumbone
- Lizandro Zapata - Choir
- Claudia Altamar - Choir
- Carlos Ortiz - Choir
- Alexa Hernández - Choir
- Luis Fernando Ardila - Choir
- Tony Navia - Choir
- Yanet Waldman (Joel) - Choir
- Guillermo Vives - Choir
- El Chato and Los Pequeños Gigantes - Choir

Technical Credits

- Joseph Max Klitfus - Arranger
- Fernando Garavito - Direction
- Ricardo Acosta - Production
- Carlos Vives - Executive Producer
- Adolfo "El Mono" Levi - Engineer
- Carlos Vives - Design
- Dora Franco - Photography
- John Jairo - Makeup
- Fotoletras - Graphics
- Nelson Robayo - Illustrations
- Recorded in "The Studio" during May 1986
