= Tengo Fe =

Studio album by Carlos Vives
- Released: August 12, 1997
- Genre: Vallenato, cumbia, bambuco
- Label: Sonolux (Colombia); EMI/Virgin Records (worldwide)
- Producer: Carlos Vives; Luis Ángel "El Papa" Pastor; Einar Escaf

Carlos Vives chronology
La Tierra del Olvido (1995)	Tengo Fe (1997)	El Amor de Mi Tierra (1999)

Tengo Fe (I Have Faith) is the eighth album by Colombian singer/composer Carlos Vives, released on August 12, 1997.

== Track listing ==
1. "Tengo Fé" (C. Vives, C. Medina) – 3:43
2. "Qué Diera" (C. Vives) – 4:12
3. "Buenos Tiempos" (C. Vives) – 3:51
4. "Pambe" (C. Vives) – 3:46
5. "Amores Escondidos" (C. Vives, E. Cuadrado) – 3:41
6. "Interior" (C. Vives, C. Medina) – 3:33
7. "Sol de Mediodía" (C. Vives) – 2:59
8. "Cumbia Americana" (C. Vives) – 4:11
9. "Malas Lenguas" (C. Vives)– 4:15
10. "El Caballito" (Traditional Arrangement) – 3:44

== Album credits ==
Performance credits

- Carlos Vives – Primary Artist, Vocals
- Egidio Cuadrado – Accordion
- Luis Angel Pastor – Bass
- Heberth Cuadrado – Caja
- Luis Diaz – Cello
- Yesid Torres V. - Chicote
- La Provincia – Choir, Chorus
- Roberto Milanes – Double Bass
- Pablo Bernal – Drums
- Einar Escaf – Drums, Percussion
- Mayte Montero – Gaita
- Eder Polo – Guacharaca
- Andrés Castro – Guitar
- Carlos Huertas – Guitar
- Ernesto "Teto" Ocampo – Guitar
- Carlos Ivan Medina – Keyboards, Piano
- Gilbert Martínez – Percussion
- Alfredo Rosado – Tamboura
- Ricardo Hernández – Viola
- Mario Diaz – Violin

Technical credits

- La Provincia – Arranger
- Tommy Afont – Engineer
- Ray Bardani – Engineer
- Carlos Vives – Producer
- Ted Jensen – Mastering

== Charts ==
Chart (1997)	Peak position
US Top Latin Albums (Billboard)	12
US Latin Pop Albums (Billboard)	6
US Tropical Albums (Billboard)	6

== Sales and certifications ==
Region	Certification	Certified units/sales
Colombia	6× Platinum	360,000
