= Clásicos de la Provincia =

1993 studio album by Carlos Vives

Studio album by Carlos Vives
- Released: August 27, 1993 (Colombia); February 22, 1994 (International)
- Genre: Vallenato
- Length: 50:55
- Labels: Sonolux (Colombia); Polygram (worldwide)
- Producers: Eduardo De Narváez; Bernardo Ossa; Fidel Jaramillo

Carlos Vives chronology
Escalona: Vol. 2 (1992)	Clásicos de la Provincia (1993)	La Tierra del Olvido (1995)

Clásicos de la Provincia (Classics from the Province) is the sixth album by Colombian singer-songwriter Carlos Vives. Released in Colombia in late 1993, and internationally on February 22, 1994, the album is a collection of Colombian vallenato classics. The album made Vives a superstar in Colombia and was his breakthrough in the vallenato genre.

The album sold over 1.4 million copies in Colombia, and 3 million copies worldwide in its first 6 months of being released. Worldwide copies stands at 4 million.

== Track listing ==
1. "La gota fría" (E. Zuleta) – 3:33
2. "Amor Sensible" (F. Molina) – 4:26
3. "Alicia Adorada" (J. Valencia) – 4:15
4. "La Hamaca Grande" (A. Pacheco) – 3:16
5. "El Cantor De Fonseca" (C. Huertas) – 3:07
6. "Matilde Lina" (L. Díaz) – 3:57
7. "Altos Del Rosario" (A. Durán) – 3:56
8. "Honda Herida" (R. Escalona) – 3:03
9. "La Cañaguatera" (I. Carrillo) – 3:13
10. "Lirio Rojo" (C. Ochoa) – 2:48
11. "La Tijera" (L. Martínez) – 3:27
12. "Compae Chipuco" (C. Gomez) – 3:16
13. "Pedazo De Acordeón" (A. Durán) – 4:06
14. "La Celosa" (F. Molina) – 4:12
15. "Contestación A La Brasilera (fragmento)" (A. Zabaleta) – 0:49

== Personnel ==
Performance credits

- Carlos Vives - Primary Artist, Director, Vocals
- Egidio Cuadrado - Accordion, Vocals (Pedazo de Acordeón), Backing Vocals
- Ernesto "Teto" Ocampo - Acoustic Guitar, Electric Guitar, Guitar
- Luis Ángel Pastor - Bass
- John Jairo Lemus - Conga
- Luis Pacheco - Conga, Guache, Tamboura, Tambourine
- Alexa Hernández - Vocals, Choir
- Amparo Sandino - Vocals Choir
- Aníbal Rivera - Electric Guitar
- Antonio Arnedo - Gaita, Soprano Saxophone
- Eder Polo - Guacharaca
- Bernardo Ossa - Keyboards, Percussion
- Michael Egizi - Piano
- Alfredo Rosado - Tamboura, Tambourine
- Heberth Cuadrado - Violin, Vocals ("Pedazo De Acordeón")

Technical credits

- Eduardo de Narváez - Arranger, Engineer, Producer
- Ernesto "Teto" Ocampo - Arranger
- Bernardo Ossa - Arranger
- Carlos Vives - Arranger, Direction
- Rafael Mejía - Art Direction
- Phil Austin - Engineer
- Jorge Díaz - Engineer
- Robin Jenny - Engineer, Mastering
- Manuel Riveira - Representation

== Chart performance ==
Chart (1994–1995)	Peak position
Chile (APF)	1
U.S. Billboard Top Latin Albums	2
U.S. Billboard Latin Pop Albums	2
U.S. Billboard Heatseekers Albums	21

== Certifications and sales ==
Region	Certification	Certified units/sales
Argentina	—	120,000
Chile	2× Platinum	
Colombia	Gold	1,500,000
Mexico (AMPROFON)	2× Gold	200,000
Spain (Promusicae)	3× Platinum	300,000^{^}
United States (RIAA)	Gold (Latin)	400,000
Summaries
Worldwide	—	4,000,000
^{^} Shipments figures based on certification alone.

== See also ==
- List of best-selling albums in Colombia
- List of best-selling Latin albums

== External credits ==
- Carlos Vives official website
