= Carlos Vives =

Colombian singer (born 1961)

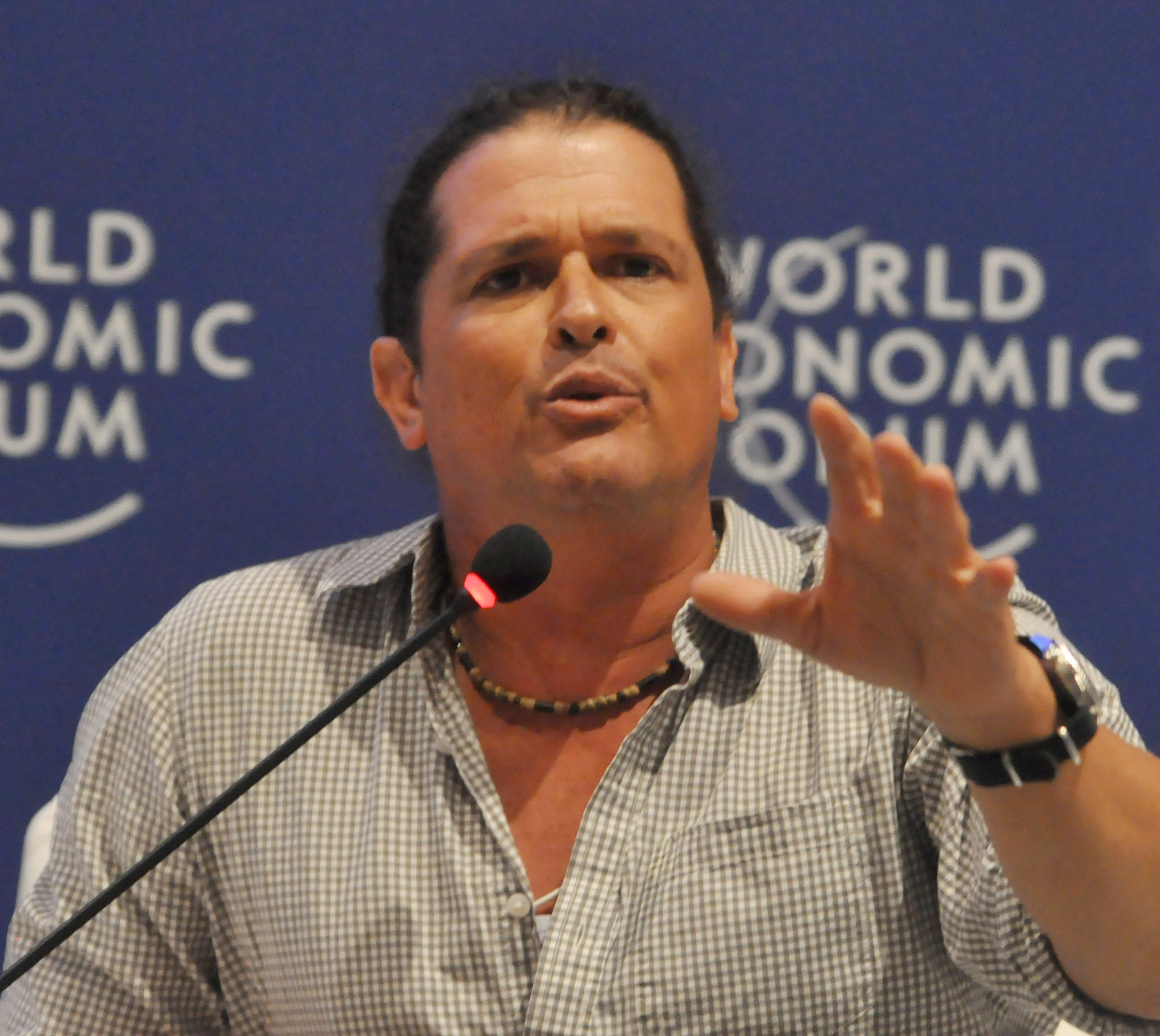
- Vives speaking at the World Economic Forum on Latin America in 2010

Background information
- Born: Carlos Alberto Vives Restrepo; 7 August 1961 (age 65); Santa Marta, Colombia
- Genres: Vallenato; cumbia; porro; champeta; rock; Latin pop; bambuco; dance-pop; reggaeton; tropical music
- Occupations: Singer; songwriter; actor
- Years active: 1978–present
- Labels: FM Discos Y Cintas; Sony; Sonolux; Gaira Música Local; PolyGram; EMI; Virgin
- Website: carlosvives.com

Carlos Alberto Vives Restrepo (born 7 August 1961) is a Colombian singer, songwriter and actor.

One of the best-selling Latin music artists ever, with over 20 million records sold worldwide, Vives is regarded as one of the most influential artists in the world as he has progressively helped vallenato gain popularity globally and for his interpretation of traditional music styles, such as cumbia, champeta, bambuco and porro, with Latin pop, rock, reggaeton, dance-pop and tropical music.

Through his career he was honored with two Grammy Awards and twenty Latin Grammy Awards, being awarded with the Latin Recording Academy Person of the Year in 2024. Vives has been honored with several accolades for his songwriting and producer contribution including the BMI President’s Award, the ASCAP Founders Award, and an induction into the Billboard Latin Music Hall of Fame. In 2019, Vives was selected as number 45 on both the Greatest of All Time Latin Artists and Top Latin Artists 2010s by Billboard.

He worked with some of the most influential artists in the Latin music scene, including Juan Luis Guerra, Ricky Martin, Shakira, Wisin, Daddy Yankee, Alejandro Sanz, Camilo, Sebastián Yatra, Mau y Ricky, Michel Teló, Gente de Zona, Carlos Rivera, Silvestre Dangond and Juanes.

Vives is also a successful actor. His roles as the titular character in the soap opera Gallito Ramírez and as Rafael Escalona in Escalona, a story about the famous Colombian composer of the same name, are among his most important and well-remembered appearances.

== Early life ==
Carlos Vives was born on 7 August 1961 in Santa Marta, Magdalena, Colombia, where he spent his first 12 years of life. At that age, he and his family moved to Bogotá. He enrolled at Jorge Tadeo Lozano University and holds a degree in Advertising from the university. In Bogotá, he also acquired a taste for rock, getting involved in the local music scene, and started playing in bars and cafés around the city.

== 1982–1989 ==
In 1982, Vives began acting in a number of shows and telenovelas including Pequeños Gigantes ("Little Giants" – 1983) and Tuyo es Mi Corazón ("Yours Is My Heart" – 1985). He finally found fame in 1986 by playing the title role of Gallito Ramírez, which told the story of a Colombian Caribbean coast boxer who falls in love with an uptight girl, who was portrayed by his first wife, Margarita Rosa de Francisco. That same year, he released his first album, Por Fuera y Por Dentro. The album, primarily made of ballads, failed to gain any success. In 1987, he released his second ballad album, No Podrás Escapar de Mí. Though the title track reached No. 30 on the Billboard Hot Latin Tracks, the album did not sell well. His next album, Al Centro de la Ciudad, would become his last album to feature synthesizer-romantic ballads. Some of the songs got some attention being featured in telenovelas, but the album, just as its predecessors, failed to gain success.

In 1989, he was offered an acting job in Puerto Rico, and upon moving, he took a break in his music career. He is remembered for his leading roles in the soaps La Otra and Aventurera. He married Herlinda Gómez, his second wife (they have since divorced). Vives would spend his time between Colombia, Miami and the city of Mayagüez, Herlinda's hometown, during his marriage to her.

== Since 1991 ==
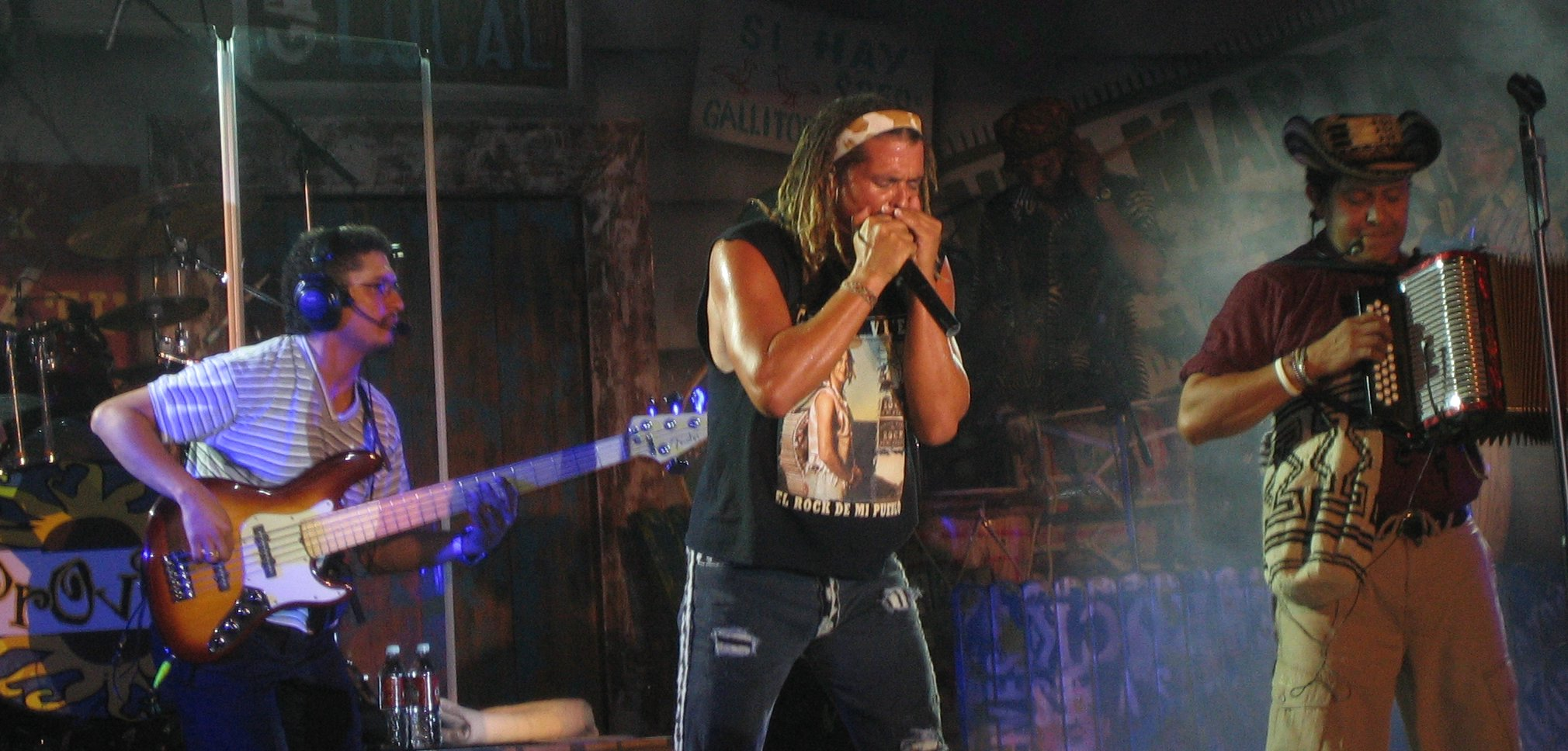
Carlos Vives

Upon his return to Colombia in 1991, he was offered a TV role that would change his life forever. He was cast in the leading role of a fantasy series based on the life of vallenato composer Rafael Escalona unsurprisingly titled Escalona. He sang the composer's songs in the series, and that's when he retooled his career towards vallenato, gaining national success with the release of the Telenovela's two soundtrack albums, Escalona: Un Canto a la Vida and Escalona: Vol. 2.

In 1993, backed by the band "La Provincia", Vives released the album Clásicos de la Provincia in which he started fusing vallenato with rock, pop and other Caribbean Colombian ethnic rhythms. This fusion scandalized vallenato purists. Clásicos de la Provincia, won the Billboard Latin Music Awards Best Album, introducing vallenato to both Colombia and the rest of the world.

The follow-up album, La Tierra del Olvido would mark a further step in Vives' desire to fusion rock, funk and pop music with traditional Colombian genres. The album gave Vives classic hits such as the title track, and the up-tempo opening track Pa' Mayte.

His subsequent releases, Tengo Fé (1997), El Amor de Mi Tierra (1999), Déjame Entrar (2001) and El Rock de Mi Pueblo (2004), were all commercially successful and were well received by critics. In 2002 Carlos Vives' album "Déjame Entrar" won him his first Grammy Award for Best Traditional Tropical Latin Album.

In 2009 he released the album Clásicos de la Provincia II, which was sold exclusively in Colombian supermarket chain "Almacenes Éxito." The album saw Vives' return to covering vallenato songs in his own style.

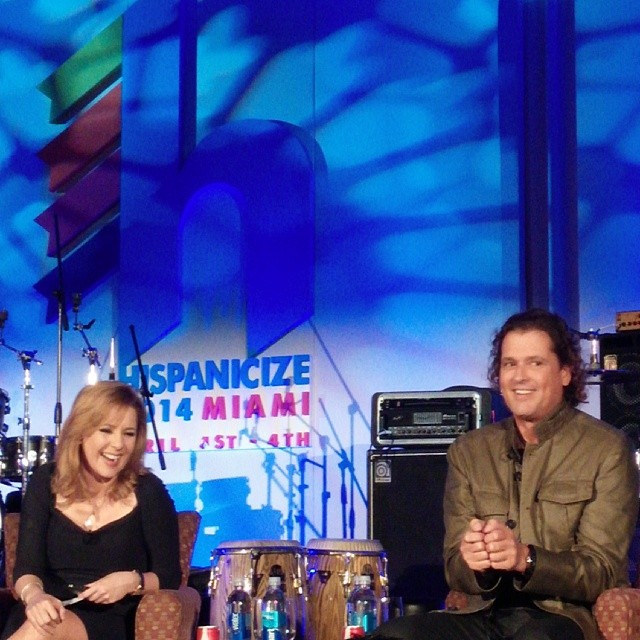
Carlos Vives interviewed by Ana María Canseco

=== Current ===
With more than 40 songs written in 2012, Corazon Profundo was released in April 2013 and featured 11 tracks. The first single, "Volví a Nacer", was released in September 2012 and went straight to No. 1 on Billboard. The second single, "Como Le Gusta a Tu Cuerpo" featuring Michel Teló was released in late January 2013. Carlos appeared with fellow artists Ricardo Montaner, Fanny Lu, and Andrés Cepeda as one of the coaches for the first season of the vocal competition series phenomenon The Voice Colombia, which premiered October 2012 via Colombian TV network Caracol TV.

On 27 May 2016, "La Bicicleta" with fellow Colombian singer Shakira was released as a single. The video for the song was filmed in Colombia in each of their home cities. The song debuted at the number one spot on Billboard's US Latin Airplay chart and number four on the US Hot Latin Songs chart.

On 13 September 2018, Telemundo announced Carlos Vives as the fourth coach of La Voz (U.S.). Vives joined Luis Fonsi, Alejandra Guzman and Wisin as coaches on the Spanish-language version of NBC singing-competition La Voz.

In 2020, he joined Diego Torres, Lali, Coti, Ángela Torres, Thalía, Camila's Mario Domm, Sin Bandera's Leonel García, Reik's Jesús Navarro, Río Roma, Carlos Rivera, Camilo, Fonseca, Manuel Turizo, Jorge Villamizar, Pedro Capó, Farruko, Kany García and Rauw Alejandro, Ivete Sangalo, Dilsinho, Rubén Blades, Gente de Zona, Mau y Ricky, El Cigala, Dani Martín, Leslie Grace, Nicky Jam, Ara Malikian and Prince Royce for 'Color Esperanza 2020', a version of Diego Torres' Color Esperanza.

In April 2021, Vives joined Ricky Martin for "Canción Bonita", a song which was critically acclaimed for its fusion of musical styles from Colombia and Puerto Rico. The song was nominated for Song of the Year and Best Pop Song at the 2021 Latin Grammy Awards.

In November 2021, he was a featured artist in the Disney movie Encanto singing the credits song "Colombia, Mi Encanto" written by Lin-Manuel Miranda.

In 2023, Vives appeared in the Disney+ show 'The Low Tone Club' and sang the theme 'Tumbando Muros' and two other songs for the show. In addition, Vives wrote all songs included on the show's soundtrack.

In 2024, the Latin Grammys recognized Vives as Person of the Year at their annual ceremony for his significant contributions to Latin American music and his philanthropic efforts in Colombia and the broader Spanish-speaking community.

== Controversies ==
While Carlos Vives is widely recognized as a cultural ambassador for Colombia, his career has occasionally been marked by public debates and legal challenges. These incidents range from intellectual property disputes to cultural commentary.

In 2017, Vives and fellow Colombian artist Shakira faced a significant legal hurdle regarding their global hit "La Bicicleta". A Cuban singer-songwriter, Livam, filed a lawsuit in Spain alleging that the track's lyrics and melody plagiarized his 1997 song, "Yo te quiero tanto". Although royalties were temporarily frozen during the proceedings, the Spanish court ultimately cleared Vives and Shakira of all charges in 2019, concluding that the similarities were common within the genre and did not constitute an infringement.

Later in 2017, Vives sparked a cultural debate by criticizing the lyrical content of "trap" music. During a press conference, he expressed concern over the genre's "violent" and "explicit sexual descriptions," characterizing certain aspects of the movement as inappropriate for younger audiences. While Vives emphasized his respect for other artists and noted his appreciation for reggaeton rhythms, his comments drew pushback from urban music proponents who viewed his stance as overly conservative or exclusionary toward modern genre evolution.

In 2023, Vives faced criticism for comments regarding the existence of patriarchy in Latin American culture. During an interview, he stated that he had "never been touched by patriarchy," arguing that in his own upbringing and family structure, women held significant power and were the primary force "pulling" the family forward. Critics labeled these remarks as dismissive of the systemic reality of gender inequality in the region, while others defended them as an authentic reflection of the matriarchal dynamics common in many Caribbean coastal households.

In May 2024, a video surfaced of Vives performing the 1974 vallenato "Aracataca Te Espera" during a gathering in Valledupar. The song, composed by Armando Zabaleta, historically reproaches Nobel laureate Gabriel García Márquez for his perceived neglect of his birthplace following his international success. Because the performance occurred near the 10th anniversary of the author's passing, it triggered an online debate regarding the appropriateness of the lyrics. However, the performance was a rendition of a folk standard rather than a personal statement by Vives, who has historically expressed profound admiration for Márquez and his literary contributions to Colombian identity.

== Personal life ==
Vives was married to the Colombian actress Margarita Rosa de Francisco in a relationship that was closely followed by the national media. Puerto Rican Herlinda Gómez was his second wife, with whom he had two children: Carlos Enrique Vives and Lucía Vives. He is now married to former Miss Colombia Claudia Elena Vásquez and they have two children: Elena Vives, and Pedro Vives. He divides his time between Miami and Colombia, mainly Santa Marta and Bogotá.

== Discography ==
Studio albums

- Por Fuera y Por Dentro (1986)
- No Podrás Escapar de Mí (1987)
- Al Centro de la Ciudad (1989)
- Escalona: Un Canto A La Vida (1991)
- Escalona: Vol. 2 (1992)
- Clásicos de la Provincia (1993)
- La Tierra del Olvido (1995)
- Tengo Fe (1997)
- El Amor de Mi Tierra (1999)
- Déjame Entrar (2001)
- El Rock de Mi Pueblo (2004)
- Clásicos de la Provincia II (2009)
- Corazón Profundo (2013)
- Más + Corazón Profundo (2014)
- Vives (2017)
- Cumbiana (2020)
- Cumbiana II (2022)
- Escalona Nunca Se Habia Grabado Asi (2023)
- El Último Disco Vol. 1 (2026)

== Filmography ==
=== Television series and shows ===
Year	Title	Role	Notes
1983	Pequeños Gigantes	Guineo	Season 1, recurring role
1984	El Faraón	Capitolino Rojas	Season 1, recurring role
1985	Tuyo es mi corazón	Carlos Sánchez	Season 1, episode 1
1986	Gallito Ramírez	Javier "Gallito" Ramírez	Season 1, main role
1987	Tormento	César Augusto Caballero	Season 1, episode 1
1988	La Otra	Arnaldo Vásquez	Season 1, main role
1989	La Conciencia de Lucía	Alberto	Season 1, main role
1989	LP loca pasión	Julio Sanmiguel "Sammy"	Season 1, main role
1990	Aventurera	Juan Carlos Santander	Season 1, main role
1991	Cadena Braga	José Antonio	Season 1, episode 1
1992	Escalona	Rafael Escalona	Season 1, main role
1992	La mujer doble	Mateo Escondria	Season 1, main role
1993	La estrategia del caracol	The reporter	Recurring role
2012	La Voz Colombia	Himself	Season 1; Coach
2013	La Voz Spanish	Himself	Season 2; Mentor
2014	Susana Giménez	Himself	Cameo; Season 15, episode 25
2019	Pescaíto	El Profe	Season 1, main role
2019–2020	La Voz US	Himself	Season 1–2; Coach
2020	El mundo perdido de Cumbiana	Himself	Television documentary
2022	Pablus Gallinazo		Television Film, main role
2022–2023	The Low Tone Club - El Club de los Graves	Amaranto Molina	Recurring role

== See also ==
- List of best-selling Latin music artists
- List of singer-songwriters/Colombia
- Pop Latino
