= Fonseca discography =

- Studio albums: 4
- Live albums: 2
- Compilation albums: 1
- Singles: 17
- Music videos: 12

The discography of Colombian singer-songwriter Fonseca consists of four studio albums, two live albums, one compilation album, seventeen singles and fourteen music videos. In 2002, he was signed with Líderes Entertainment and released his eponymous debut studio album in February 2002, Fonseca.

== Albums ==
=== Studio albums ===
List of albums, with selected chart positions
Title	Album details	Peak chart positions			Certifications
Title	Album details	MEX	US Latin	US Trop	Certifications
Fonseca	Released: 2002; Label: Líderes Entertainment Group, EMI Colombia; Format: CD	—	—	—	
Corazón	Released: May 1, 2005; Label: EMI Latin; Format: CD, digital download	67	—	7	ASINCOL: 2× Platinum; AVPF: Platinum
Gratitud	Released: May 27, 2008; Label: EMI Latin; Format: CD, digital download	61	70	9	ASINCOL: 5× Platinum
Ilusión	Released: September 30, 2011; Label: Sony Music; Format: CD, digital download	—	—	11	ASINCOL: Diamond; AVPF: Gold
Conexión	Released: October 2, 2015; Label: Sony Music; Format: CD, digital download	—	12	2	ASINCOL: Diamond
"—" denotes releases that did not chart.

=== Live albums ===
List of albums, with selected details
Title	Album details	Certifications
Live Bogotá	Released: November 16, 2010; Label: EMI; Format: CD/DVD, digital download	
Sinfónico (with Orquesta Sinfónica Nacional de Colombia)	Released: July 9, 2014; Label: EMI; Format: CD/DVD, digital download	ASINCOL: 3× Platinum

=== Compilation albums ===
List of albums, with selected details
Title	Album details
Grandes Éxitos	Released: November 19, 2013; Label: EMI; Format: CD, digital download

== Singles ==
List of singles, with selected chart positions, showing year released and album name
Title	Year	Peak chart positions					Album
Title	Year	COL	US LATIN	US TROPICAL	US LATIN POP	VEN	Album
"Magangué"	2002	—	—	—	—	—	Fonseca
"Noche de Carnaval"	2003	—	—	—	—	—	Fonseca
"Sueño"	2003	—	—	—	—	—	Fonseca
"Confiésame"	2004	—	—	—	—	—	Fonseca
"Te Mando Flores"	2005	1	8	6	3	—	Corazón
"Como Me Mira"	2005	1	—	—	—	—	Corazón
"Hace Tiempo"	2006	3	45	14	26	—	Corazón
"Enrédame"	2008	6	26	23	11	—	Gratitud
"Arroyito"	2008	1	22	12	10	3	Gratitud
"Paraíso"	2009	—	—	—	—	—	Gratitud
"Estar Lejos" (with Willie Colón)	2009	5	—	—	—	—	Gratitud
"Desde Que No Estás"	2011	7	45	3	—	—	Ilusión
"Eres Mi Sueño"	2011	5	15	4	11	—	Ilusión
"Ay Amor"	2012	17	—	—	—	—	Ilusión
"Si Te Acuerdas De Mi"	2013	—	—	—	—	—	Ilusión
"Prometo"	2013	—	—	—	—	—	Ilusión
"Tu Amor Ya Sabe"	2014	—	—	—	—	48	Ilusión
"Entre Mi Vida y La Tuya"	2015	4	49	1	7	8	—N/a
"—" denotes a title that was not released or did not chart in that territory

== Album appearances ==
The following songs are not singles and have not appeared on an album by Fonseca.

Title	Year	Other artist(s)	Album
"Me Veo y Te Veo"	2010	Alex Campos	Lenguaje De Amor

== Music videos ==
List of music videos, showing year released and director
Title	Year	Director
"Magangué"	2003	Unknown
"Confiésame"	2004	Unknown
"Te Mando Flores"	2005	Jose Nava
"Como Me Mira"	2005	Pedro Delguy
"Hace Tiempo"	2006	Picky Talarico
"Enrédame"	2007	Simon Brand
"Arroyito"	2007	Unknown
"Paraíso"	2009	Simon Brand
"Estar Lejos"	2010	Unknown
"Desdes Que No Estás"	2011	Picky Talarico
"Eres Mi Sueño"	2011	Pablo García
"Ay Amor"	2012	Pablo García
