= Ilusión World Tour =

2012–13 concert tour by Fonseca

Ilusion World Tour
- Tour by Fonseca
- Promotional poster for tour
- Associated album: Ilusión
- Start date: September 15, 2012
- End date: TBD
- No. of shows: 34

Fonseca concert chronology
- Tour Éxito 2011 (2011); Ilusion World Tour (2012-2013)

The Illusion World Tour was the fourth concert tour by Colombian musician, singer-songwriter Fonseca in support of his fourth studio album, Ilusión. The tour began in Loja, Ecuador, and continued through Central America and Oceania in the last months of 2012. The tour then continued in South America and North America, with more dates in January and April 2013, before ending on May 12, 2013 in Seattle, Washington, at the Mayden Bauer Center.

== Background and development ==
Fonseca begin travelling with a small tour supporting his fourth album Ilusión, beginning on September 12, 2012. The two acts in America Central are part of the Gigantes Tour with singers Marc Anthony and Chayanne. The date scheduled for Costa Rica was postponed until September 30 due road blocks on roads in Nicaragua, because of a Salvadoran strike. The three acts in Australia feature the musician Willie Colón, the second show (in Brisbane) is part of the Clave Contra Clave (Latin Live Competition) as the final act.

== Opening acts ==
- Daniel Betancourth (Ecuador)

== Setlist ==
This is the setlist for Ecuador shows.

1. "Eres Mi Sueño"
2. "Viene Subiendo"
3. "Corazón"
4. "Enrédame"
5. "Perdón"
6. "Mercedes"
7. "Cantor de Fonseca"
8. "Ay Amor"
9. "Paraíso"
10. "Abcdario"
11. "Beautiful Sunshine"
12. "Confiésame"
13. "El Alma en los Labios"
14. "Alma" (acoustic)
15. "Ilusión"
16. "Desde Que No Estás"
17. "Arroyito"
18. "Te Mando Flores"
19. "Hace Tiempo"

Encore

20. "Idilio"
21. "Como Me Mira"
22. "Eres Mi Sueño"

== Tour dates ==
Date	City	Country	Venue
South America
September 15, 2012	Loja	Ecuador	Plaza Simón Bolivar
Central America
September 29, 2012	San José	Costa Rica	Estadio Nacional de Costa Rica
October 3, 2012	Panama	Panama	Figali Convention Center
Oceania
October 26, 2012	Sydney	Australia	Luna Park Sydney
October 28, 2012	Melbourne	Australia	Palace Theatre
Central America
January 13, 2013	Palmares de Alajuela	Ecuador	Campo Ferial de Palmares
South America
January 23, 2013	Riohacha	Colombia	Cerrejón
March 25, 2013	Cartagena	Colombia	Teatro Heredia
March 14, 2013	Guayaquil	Ecuador	Centro de Convenciones Simon Bolívar
March 15, 2013	Quito	Ecuador	Teatro Agora de la Casa de la Cultura
March 23, 2013	Bogotá	Colombia	Estadio Nemesio Camacho
North America
April 11, 2013	Dallas	United States	House of Blues Dallas
April 12, 2013	San Antonio	United States	Club Río
April 14, 2013	Houston	United States	House of Blues Houston
April 17, 2013	Washington	United States	Howard Theatre
April 18, 2013	New York City	United States	Irving Plaza
April 19, 2013	Boston	United States	Wonderland Ballroom
April 20, 2013	Montreal	Canada	Métropolis
April 21, 2013	Raleigh	United States	The Ritz
April 25, 2013	Tampa	United States	Club Underground
April 26, 2013	Miami	United States	Fillmore Theatre
April 27, 2013	Orlando	United States	Hard Rock Cafe
April 28, 2013	Charlotte	United States	Fillmore Theatre
May 8, 2013	Ventura	United States	Majestic Ventura Theater
May 9, 2013	Los Angeles	United States	Club Nokia
May 11, 2013	San Francisco	United States	The Regency
May 12, 2013	Seattle	United States	Mayden Bauer Center
South America
May 17, 2013	Ambato	Ecuador	Plaza de Toros Ambato
May 18, 2013	Ibarra	Ecuador	Estadio Deportivo Universidad Técnica del Norte
June 13, 2013	Quito	Ecuador	Teatro Agora de la Casa de la Cultura
June 14, 2013	Guayaquil	Ecuador	Centro de Convenciones Simon Bolívar
June 21, 2013	Valencia	Venezuela	Forum de Valencia
June 22, 2013	Caracas	Venezuela	Terraza del C.C.C.T.
