= Fonseca Sinfónico =

Sinfónico

Live album by Fonseca and Orquesta Sinfónica Nacional de Colombia
- Released: 9 July 2014
- Recorded: 2014
- Length: 61:52 CD
- Label: EMI Mexico
- Director: Paul Dury

Fonseca chronology
Grandes Éxitos (2013)	Sinfónico (2014)

Fonseca video chronology
Live Bogotá (2010)	Sinfónico (2011)

Fonseca Sinfónico, also simply known as Sinfónico (English: Symphonic), is collaborative live album by Colombian singer-songwriter Fonseca in collaboration with the National Symphony Orchestra of Colombia, released first in United States on July 9, 2014, and more later on July 29, 2014 in Latin America by EMI Mexico. Is the second live album Fonseca, since Live Bogotá (2010).

The album was engineered by Eduardo Bergallo (11 Episodios Sinfonicos) and arranged and co-produced by Colombian film composer Juan Andres Otalora. At the Latin Grammy Awards of 2014, the album won the award for Best Traditional Pop Vocal Album, and was nominated Album of the Year.

== Track listing ==
Fonseca — Sinfónico Con La Orquesta Sinfónica Nacional de Colombia — Standard edition
No.	Title	Length
1.	"Corazón"	4:59
2.	"Te Mando Flores"	4:40
3.	"Beautiful Sunshine"	4:16
4.	"Enrédame"	4:32
5.	"Sabré Olvidar"	4:26
6.	"Arroyito"	4:07
7.	"Quiero Saber"	4:55
8.	"Paraíso"	5:05
9.	"Abecedario"	4:38
10.	"Ay Amor"	3:19
11.	"Eres Mi Sueño"	4:36
12.	"Prometo"	3:53
13.	"Angel Eyes"	4:05
14.	"What a Wonderful World"	4:21

== Charts ==
Chart (2014)	Peak position
US Latin Pop Albums (Billboard)	15
US Classical Albums (Billboard)	17
