= Live Bogotá =

Live album by Fonseca
- Released: November 16, 2010
- Recorded: Bogotá, Colombia, August 15, 2010
- Genre: Latin pop
- Length: 78:41
- Language: Spanish
- Label: EMI Music Colombia
- Director: Picky Talarico

Fonseca chronology
Gratitud (2008)	Live Bogotá (2010)	Ilusión (2011)

Fonseca video chronology
Live Bogotá (2010)

Live Bogotá, is the first live album by Colombian musician Fonseca. It features his "Gratitour" last performance from the August 15th concert at the Nemesio Camacho Stadium in Bogotá, Colombia. The album was released on November 16, 2010 on two different formats including a live CD/DVD and digital download.

== Track listing ==
DVD track listing
No.	Title	Writer(s)	Length
1.	"Cómo Te Extraño"	Juan Fernando Fonseca	1:45
2.	"Enrédame"	Juan Fernando Fonseca	3:46
3.	"Cómo Me Mira"	Juan Fernando Fonseca	4:16
4.	"Alma"	Juan Fernando Fonseca, J. Eduardo Murguia, Mauricio L. Arriaga	3:47
5.	"Catalina"	Juan Fernando Fonseca, Alejandro Aponte	4:17
6.	"San José"	Juan Fernando Fonseca, Alejandro Aponte	4:33
7.	"Paraíso"	Juan Fernando Fonseca	4:23
8.	"Estar Lejos"	Juan Fernando Fonseca	4:17
9.	"Idilio"	Titi Amadeo	6:21
10.	"Mercedes"	Adolfo Pacheco
11.	"Perdón"	Alejandro Bassi	4:37
12.	"Corazón"	Juan Fernando Fonseca, Alejandro Aponte	4:22
13.	"Beautiful Sunshine"	Juan Fernando Fonseca	4:12
14.	"Confiésame"	Juan Fernando Fonseca	4:08
15.	"Viene Subiendo"	Alejo Aponte, Juan Fernando Fonseca
16.	"Lagartija Azul"	Maía, Juan Fernando Fonseca	4:33
17.	"Melancolía Del Ayer"	Juan Fernando Fonseca	2:38
18.	"Hace Tiempo"	Juan Fernando Fonseca, Wilfran Castillo	5:08
19.	"Te Mando Flores"	Juan Fernando Fonseca	5:18
20.	"Arroyito"	Wilfran Castillo
51.	Untitled		6:27

Extras
No.	Title	Length
1.	"Behind The Scenes"
2.	"Galería de fotos"
3.	"Gratitud - Off Stage"

Audio CD
No.	Title	Writer(s)	Length
1.	"Cómo Te Extraño"	Juan Fernando Fonseca	1:45
2.	"Enrédame"	Juan Fernando Fonseca	3:46
3.	"Cómo Me Mira"	Juan Fernando Fonseca	4:16
4.	"Alma"	Juan Fernando Fonseca, J. Eduardo Murguia, Mauricio L. Arriaga	3:47
5.	"Catalina"	Juan Fernando Fonseca, Alejandro Aponte	4:17
6.	"San José"	Juan Fernando Fonseca, Alejandro Aponte	4:33
7.	"Paraíso"	Juan Fernando Fonseca	4:23
8.	"Estar Lejos"	Juan Fernando Fonseca	4:17
9.	"Idilio"	Titi Amadeo	6:21
10.	"Perdón"	Alejandro Bassi	4:37
11.	"Corazón"	Juan Fernando Fonseca, Alejandro Aponte	4:22
12.	"Beautiful Sunshine"	Juan Fernando Fonseca	4:12
13.	"Confiésame"	Juan Fernando Fonseca	4:08
14.	"Lagartija Azul"	Maía, Juan Fernando Fonseca	4:33
15.	"Melancolía Del Ayer"	Juan Fernando Fonseca	2:38
16.	"Hace Tiempo"	Juan Fernando Fonseca, Wilfran Castillo	5:08
17.	"Te Mando Flores"	Juan Fernando Fonseca	5:18
18.	"Arroyito"	Wilfran Castillo	6:27
Total length:			77:21
