= Si Te Acuerdas de Mi =

"Si Te Acuerdas de MI"

Single by Fonseca

from the album Ilusión
- Released: June 19, 2013
- Genre: Latin pop; Tropipop
- Length: 3:32
- Label: Sony Music Latin
- Songwriters: Juan Fernando Fonseca; Wilfran Castillo

Fonseca singles chronology
"Ay Amor" (2012)	"Si Te Acuerdas de MI" (2013)	"Prometo" (2013)

"Si Te Acuerdas de Mi" (English: "If You Remember Me") is a Tropipop song by Colombian singer-songwriter Fonseca, taken from his fourth studio album Ilusión (2011). It was released on June 19, 2012, in a press release by Sony Music Argentina. The song was written by Wilfran Castillo, who had composed "Arroyito" and produced by the same Fonseca and Bernardo Ossa.

== Song information ==
The song was written by the same Fonseca and Wilfran Castillo, who had composed "Arroyito" and "Te Mando Flores", the song was produced by the Colombian producer Bernardo Ossa and recorded in Ozone Studios in Bogotá. "Si Te Acuerdas de Mi" has been described by Carlos Quintana of About.com, as one of the best track of the album. And Luis Nuñez from El Riviguer said that "the song reminds me that floriculture is still alive" referring the similar rhythm with "Te Mando Flores".

== Track listing ==
- Album version
1. "Si Te Acuerdas De Mi" - 3:31

& " si te acuerdas de mi"...[cancion
