= Cuando Respiro En Tu Boca =

Single by Lucybell

from the album Peces
- Released: 1995
- Genre: Alternative rock, Rock en español
- Length: 3:30
- Label: EMI Odeón Chile
- Songwriter: Claudio Valenzuela

Lucybell singles chronology
"Vete" (1995)	"Cuando Respiro En Tu Boca" (1995)	"Eclipse" (1996)

"Cuando Respiro En Tu Boca" (When I Breath in Your Mouth) is an alternative rock song by Chilean rock band Lucybell. Released as third single from their debut album Peces on 1995. The song already have a good rotation around Chilean radios. Is considered a classic song of the band. The music video was directed by Pepe Maldonado and was composed by Claudio Valenzuela. Is the first track of the album.

== Track listing ==
- Peces (Album version)
1. "Cuando Respiro En Tu Boca" – 3:28

== Fonseca version ==
"Cuando Respiro En Tu Boca"

Song by Fonseca

from the album Ilusión +
- Genre: Latin pop
- Length: 3:31 (Album version)
- Label: Sony Music
- Songwriter: Claudio Valenzuela

The song was covered by Colombian musician Fonseca during her performance at the "Tour Éxito 2011" and "Ilusión World Tour". "Cuando Respiro En Tu Boca", was later included in the reissue for his fourth album Ilusión, adding the sign "+" as representation of the new material and strategy to boost sales in other countries. The song was produced by Andres Levin, the same Fonseca and co-produced by Santiago Muñoz.

=== Track listing ===
- Album version
1. "Cuando Respiro En Tu Boca" – 4:31

=== Credits and personnel ===
Recording

- Recorded at Fun MAchine – Pirate Studios and mixed at PolaPola Studios Brooklyn, New York City.

Personnel

- Songwriting – Cluadio Valenzuela
- Production – Andres Levin, Santiago Muñoz and Juan Fernando Fonseca
- Vocal engineering and recording – Ray Aldaco
- Music recording – Andres Levin and Juan Fernando Fonseca
- Assistant vocal recording – Juan Fernando Fonseca
- Mixing – Andy Baldwin

Credits adapted from the liner notes of Ilusión, Sony Music Latin, 10 Music.
