= Juan Andres Otalora =

- Genres: Orchestral, Latin, Jazz
- Occupation(s): Composer, Arranger, Instrumentalist
- Instrument: Guitar
- Years active: 2005-present

Juan Andres Otalora is a Colombian film and TV composer, arranger and guitarist. He won a Latin Grammy Award in 2014 for producing and arranging the album Fonseca Sinfónico.

Born in Bogota, he majored in jazz guitar from Pontifical Xavierian University, while still enrolled he began touring with artists such as Maia, Compañia Ilimitada and eventually Fonseca for 8 years.

In 2014, Otalora arranged and produced Sinfonico with Fonseca and the National Symphony Orchestra of Colombia (OSNC) which won a Latin Grammy Award for "Best Contemporary Pop Vocal Album" and was nominated for "Album of the Year".

He attended the ASCAP 2015 Film Composer Workshop and since then has scored several shorts and features including "Lila's Book" as part of his ongoing collaboration with the OSNC, this garnered him a nomination for best score at the 2018 Macondo Awards. Otalora has also worked alongside composers Jake Monaco on Netflix’s Dinotrux and Leo Birenberg on Kung Fu Panda: The Paws of Destiny. In 2018 he arranged and co-produced the album Manigua by artist Yuri Buenaventura.

In 2019 he collaborated once more with Fonseca as producer on his single Ven from the album Agustin, the single obtained 2 nominations at the 2019 Latin Grammy Award including "Song of the Year", the album obtained another two including "Album of the Year" and "Best Contemporary Pop Vocal Album", winning the latter.
