= Hace Tiempo =

Single by Fonseca

from the album Corazón
- Released: 2006
- Genre: Latin pop; Tropipop
- Length: 3:37
- Label: EMI Latin
- Songwriter: Juan Fernando Fonseca

Fonseca singles chronology
"Como Me Mira" (2005)	"Hace Tiempo" (2006)	"Enrédame" (2008)

"Hace Tiempo" (English: Has Long) is a Tropipop song by Colombian recording artist Fonseca. It was released as the third single from his second studio album Corazón (2006) at the same year.

== Track listings ==
Album version

1. "Hace Tiempo" – 3:37

CD single

1. "Hace Tiempo" (Album version) – 3:37
2. "Hace Tiempo" (Salsatón version) – 3:48

== Charts ==
Chart (2006)	Peak position
US Hot Latin Songs (Billboard)	45
US Latin Pop Airplay (Billboard)	26
US Tropical Airplay (Billboard)	14
