= Instinto =

Instinto may refer to:

- Instinto (album), 2012 album by Colombian singer-songwriter Maía
- Instinto (TV series), 2019 Spanish erotic thriller television series
