= Latin Grammy Award for Best Tropical Fusion Album =

- Awarded for: recordings of the Tropical genre
- Country: United States
- Presented by: The Latin Recording Academy
- First award: 2012
- Final award: 2018
- Website: latingrammy.com

The Latin Grammy Award for Best Tropical Fusion Album is an award presented at the Latin Grammy Awards beginning in 2012, a ceremony that recognizes excellence and creates a wider awareness of cultural diversity and contributions of Latin recording artists in the United States and internationally. The award went to solo artists, duos, or groups for releasing vocal or instrumental albums containing at least 51% of new recordings.

The award first presented to Colombian singer Fonseca for the album Ilusión+ at the 13th Latin Grammy Awards ceremony in 2012. In 2014, the accolade was combined with Latin Grammy Award for Best Contemporary Tropical Album.

== Winners and nominees ==
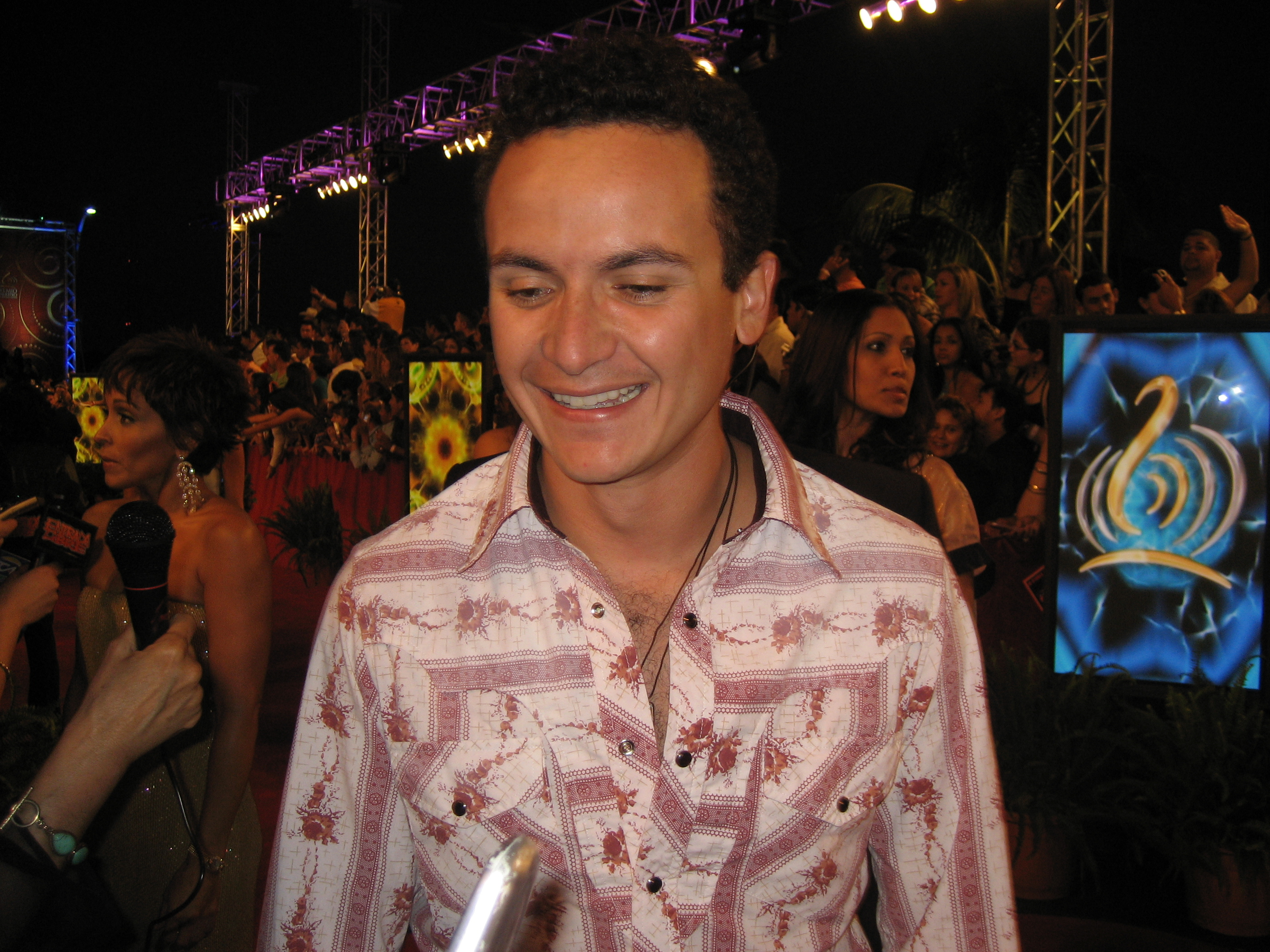
Colombian singer Fonseca was the first recipient of the award.

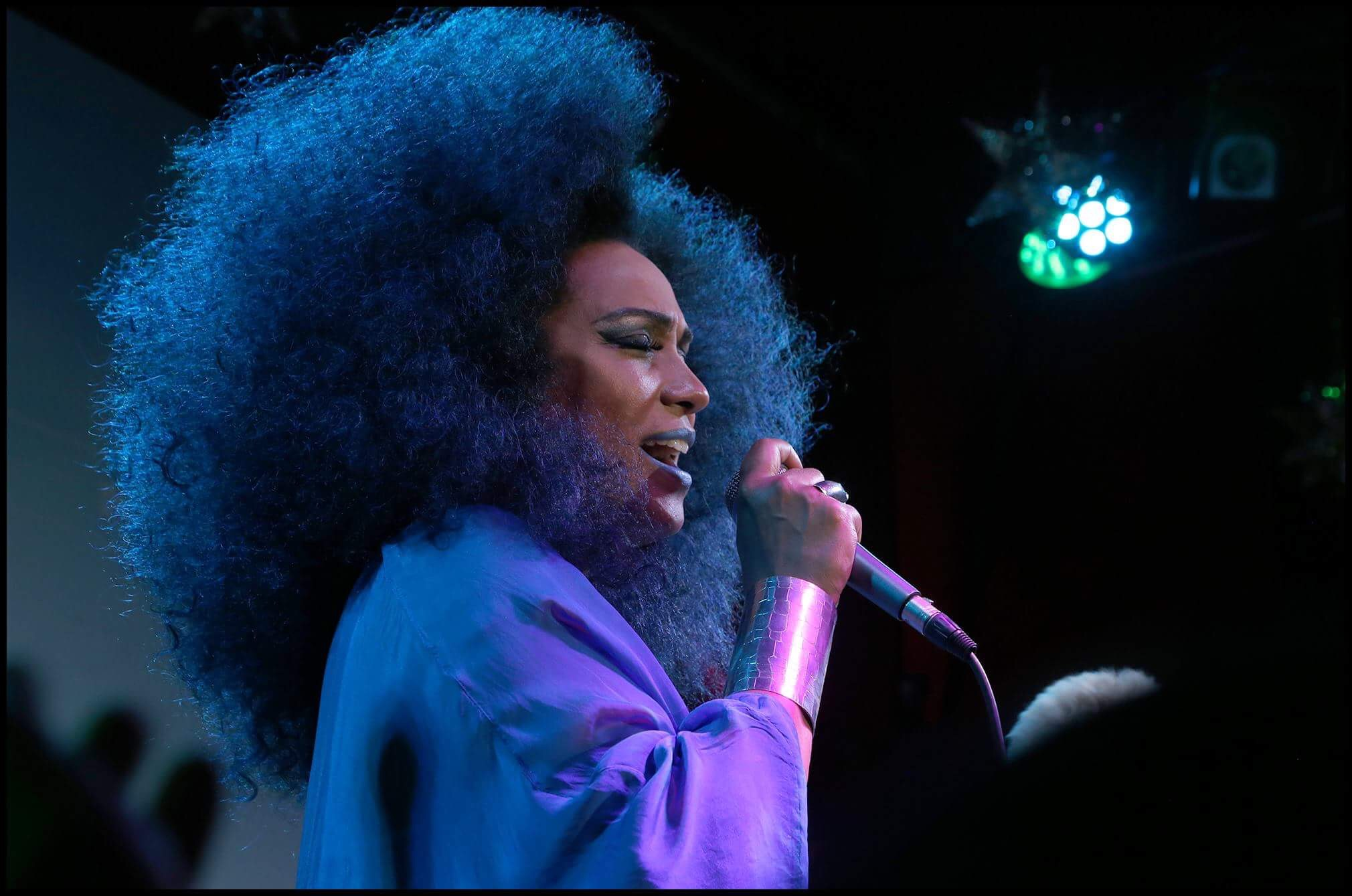
Cuban singer Aymée Nuviola was the last recipient of the award.

Year^{[I]}	Performing artist(s)	Nationality^{[II]}	Work	Nominees^{[III]}
2012	Fonseca	Colombia	Ilusión+	Caseroloops – Afronautas; Sergent Garcia – Una y Otra Vez; Juan Magan – The King of Dance; Prince Royce – Phase II
2013	Carlos Vives	Colombia	Corazón Profundo	Casadiego – Obsesiónate; Grupo Treo – Pégate; Palmacoco – Boogaflow; Tecupae – Suerte
2015	ChocQuibTown	Colombia	El Mismo	Chino & Nacho — Radio Universo; Daiquiri — Esa Morena; Juan Magan — The King is Back; Jorge Villamizar — El Día Que Vuelva
2016	Gente de Zona	Cuba	Visialízate	Cali Flow Latino — Full Hd; Cosa Nuestra — Pregoneros de La Calle; Explosión Negra — Levántate; Grupo Treo — Genera
2017	Olga Tañón	Puerto Rico	Olga Tañón y Punto	Colectra — Coletera; Gabriel — Contra Corriente; Adriana Lucía — Porrock; Salsangroove — Salsangroove
2018	Aymée Nuviola	Cuba	Como Anillo al Dedo	Manny Cruz — Sobrenatural; Diego Gutiérrez — Palante el Mambo!; Sheila King — Supernova; Safara — Cucucuprá, Cuprá

== See also ==
- Grammy Award for Best Tropical Latin Album
- Latin Grammy Award for Best Cumbia/Vallenato Album
- Latin Grammy Award for Best Traditional Tropical Album
- Latin Grammy Award for Best Tropical Song
