= Peces =

Studio album by Lucybell
- Released: 1995
- Genre: Alternative rock
- Length: 40.07
- Label: EMI Odeón Chile
- Producer: Lucybell, Mario Breuer, Hernan Rojas

Lucybell chronology
Peces (1995)	Viajar (1996)

Peces is the debut album by the Chilean rock band Lucybell, released in 1995. It was an immediate commercial and critical success in Chile, having followed on the heels of singles "De Sudor Y Ternura", "Vete" and the popular "Cuando Respiro en tu Boca".

== Track listing ==
All tracks produced by Lucybell and written by Claudio Valenzuela.

No.	Title	Length
1.	"Cuando Respiro En Tu Boca"	3:30
2.	"Lunas"	2:45
3.	"Ángeles Siameses"	3:26
4.	"Vete"	3:40
5.	"Rodar"	3:16
6.	"Eclipses"	3:07
7.	"Que No Me Vengan Con Paraísos"	2:52
8.	"Sin Alas"	3:50
9.	"Desde Acá"	3:16
10.	"Tú"	3:37
11.	"De Sudor Y Ternura"	4:36
12.	"Grito Otoñal"	5:15
Total length:		48:38

== Personnel ==
=== Musicians ===
- Claudio Valenzuela – vocals, lead guitar
- Marcelo Muñoz – bass guitar, rhythm guitar
- Gabriel Vigliensoni – keyboards, rhythm guitar
- Francisco González – drums
- Lucybell – producer

=== Production ===
- Mario Breuer – producer, mixing, mastering (tracks 1–10)
- Hernan Rojas – producer (tracks 11, 12), engineer, mixing
- Fernando Urrutia – engineer
- Piedad Rivadeneira – art direction, design, concept, cover design
- Alejandro Barruel – photography
- Pablo Rodríguez – management
