= Conexión (Fonseca album) =

Studio album by Fonseca
- Released: October 2, 2015
- Genre: Latin pop; Reggaeton
- Length: 46:47
- Label: Sony Music Latin
- Producer: Julio Reyes Copello

Fonseca chronology
Ilusión (2011)	Conexión (2015)	Agustín (2018)

Singles from Conexión
- 1. "Entre Mi Vida y la Tuya" Released: June 2, 2015; 2. "Ya No Me Faltas" Released: October 16, 2015; 3. "Vine a Buscarte" Released: April 29, 2016

Conexión (English: Connection) is the fifth studio album and sixth overall by Colombian singer Fonseca, released on October 2, 2015, through Sony Music Latin. It was produced by Julio Reyes Copello and features collaborations with Puerto Rican singer Victor Manuelle and Colombian singer Juanes. A special edition of the album titled +Conexión was released on July 7, 2017, featuring collaborations with Puerto Rican duo Alexis & Fido, Colombian singer Andrés Cepeda and Spanish singer India Martínez.

At the 17th Annual Latin Grammy Awards, the album was nominated for Album of the Year while "Vine a Buscarte" won Best Tropical Song, being Fonseca's second win in the category after "Te Mando Flores" in 2006. Additionally, the album was nominated for Best Tropical Latin Album at the 59th Annual Grammy Awards.

The album peaked at numbers 12 and 2 at the Top Latin Albums and Tropical Albums charts, respectively, being Fonseca's highest charting album in the latter chart. In 2017, it was certified diamond in Colombia after selling over 200,000 copies.

== Background ==
The album was recorded in Miami, United States and was produced by Julio Reyes Copello, it contains two collaborations, "Y Tú" with Juanes and "Amor Eterno" with Victor Manuelle, it also features musicians from various nationalities who co-wrote some tracks with Fonseca such as Argentine singer Claudia Brant in "Ya No Me Faltas", Peruvian singer Gian Marco in "Amor Eterno", Panamanian singer Omar Alfanno in "Vine a Buscarte" and Venezuelan singer Fernando Osorio in "Puede Ser".

Mainly a latin pop album, Fonseca also explores various genres of music in the record such as ranchera in "Ya No Me Faltas" and salsa in "Amor Eterno". He has said that "I've always liked to take a trip through different genres, but Conexión is the deepest and most intense album I've made, because it explores lyrics that talk about my past, love, spite and what could be". The name of the album, "connection" in English, refers to the experimentation in the album as well as the personal life of Fonseca at the time, the album shares its title with the title track, a song dedicated to his son Manolo who was born a couple of months prior to the recording of the album, Fonseca has said that "there is a "connection" beyond the heart, that word had a lot to do with everything I was doing, with the amount of sounds that I was experimenting with on the record, it was a very particular album in its process, I was doing it to pieces, I was traveling through various sounds". Following the release of the album, Fonseca embarked on a tour through United States, Puerto Rico, Colombia and Mexico.

In 2017, a special edition of the album was released including five additional songs, two original songs, "Vida Sagrada" and "Por Ahora y Por Siempre", both written for the Colombian television series El Comandante, and three new versions of songs from the album with different singers, Alexis & Fido in "Vine a Buscarte", Andrés Cepeda in "Cómo Te Puedo Entender" and India Martínez in "Entre Mi Vida y la Tuya". As promotion, Fonseca performed three concerts in Spain as a part of the Tour Conexión, in Barcelona, Madrid and Santander, the latter at the Música en Grande Festival.

== Singles ==
The song "Entre Mi Vida y la Tuya" was released as the first single for the album on June 2, 2015. The song peaked at numbers 49 and 7 at the Hot Latin Songs and Billboard Latin Pop Songs, respectively. Additionally, it reached the top position at the Tropical Songs chart, being Fonseca's first and only number one in the chart to date. "Ya No Me Faltas" was released on October 16, 2015, after being performed at the Latin American Music Awards of 2015. To promote the special edition of the album, the remix of "Vine a Buscarte" featuring Alexis & Fido was released on April 29, 2016.

== Track listing ==
Conexión track listing
No.	Title	Writer(s)	Producer(s)	Length
1.	"Entre Mi Vida y la Tuya"	Juan Fernando Fonseca	Julio Reyes Copello	2:56
2.	"Cómo Te Puedo Entender"	Fonseca	Reyes Copello	4:22
3.	"Regresa Conmigo"	Fonseca; Yoel Henríquez	Reyes Copello	3:44
4.	"Quererse Cuando Nadie Habla de Amor"	Fonseca	Reyes Copello	3:26
5.	"Vine a Buscarte"	Fonseca; Miguel Yadam González Cárdenas; Omar Alfanno	Reyes Copello	4:10
6.	"Y Tú" (featuring Juanes)	Fonseca	Reyes Copello	3:58
7.	"Ya No Me Faltas"	Fonseca; Claudia Brant	Reyes Copello	2:43
8.	"Amor Eterno" (featuring Víctor Manuelle)	Fonseca; Gian Marco Zignago	Reyes Copello	3:44
9.	"Pinta Mi Corazón"	Fonseca	Reyes Copello	3:11
10.	"Conexión"	Fonseca; Julio Reyes Copello	Reyes Copello	3:49
11.	"Ojos de Luz"	Nicolás Ospina	Reyes Copello	3:49
12.	"Puede Ser"	Fonseca; Fernando Osorio	Reyes Copello	3:53
13.	"Sorprenderte"	Fonseca; Osorio	Reyes Copello	2:57
Total length:				47:46

+Conexión track listing
No.	Title	Writer(s)	Producer(s)	Length
14.	"Vida Sagrada"	Fonseca	Reyes Copello	3:36
15.	"Por Ahora y Por Siempre"	Fonseca	Fonseca; Jhon Harby Ubaque	3:23
16.	"Vine a Buscarte (Remix)" (featuring Alexis & Fido)	Fonseca; González Cárdenas; Alfanno	Eliot Feliciano	3:10
17.	"Cómo Te Puedo Entender" (featuring Andrés Cepeda)	Fonseca	Reyes Copello	4:21
18.	"Entre Mi Vida y la Tuya" (featuring India Martínez)	Fonseca	Reyes Copello	2:56
Total length:				65:12

== Charts ==
Weekly chart performance for Conexión
Chart (2015)	Peak position
US Top Latin Albums (Billboard)	12
US Tropical Albums (Billboard)	2

== Certifications ==
Region	Certification	Certified units/sales
Colombia (ASINCOL)	Diamond	200,000
