= Latin Grammy Award for Best Traditional Pop Album =

Music award category

- Awarded for: recordings of the pop genre
- Country: United States
- Presented by: The Latin Recording Academy
- First award: 2012
- Currently held by: Laura Pausini for Yo canto 2 (2026)
- Website: latingrammy.com

The Latin Grammy Award for Best Traditional Pop Album is an award presented at the Latin Grammy Awards since 2012. The award replaced the previous awards for Best Female Pop Vocal Album, Best Male Pop Vocal Album and Best Pop Album by a Duo or Group with Vocals. According to the Latin Grammy category definitions, it is designed "For albums containing 51% or more playing time of newly recorded (previously unreleased) material and 51% playing time of Traditional Pop music. Albums must also contain 51% or more playing time of vocal tracks. For solo artists, duos or groups."

Colombian singer-songrwriter Andrés Cepeda holds the record for the most wins in the category with four, followed by Colombian singer-songwriter Fonseca. The third-most-awarded artist is Italian singer-songwriter Laura Pausini with two, who also figured as the most-awarded female artist in the category.

The albums Tanto, Prometo & Vértigo by Pablo Alborán, Natalie Cole en Español by Natalie Cole, Orígenes: El Bolero Volumen 3 by Café Quijano, Buena Vida by Diego Torres, Mil Ciudades by Andrés Cepeda, Visceral by Paula Arenas and Viajante by Fonseca has been nominated for both this award and Album of the Year. The albums Lo Mejor Que Hay En Mi Vida by Andrés Cepeda and Sinfónico & Agustín by Fonseca and the National Symphony Orchestra of Colombia and Aguilera by Christina Aguilera won this award were also nominated for Album of the Year. Los Dúo 2 by Juan Gabriel became the first album to win both awards.

== Winners and nominees ==
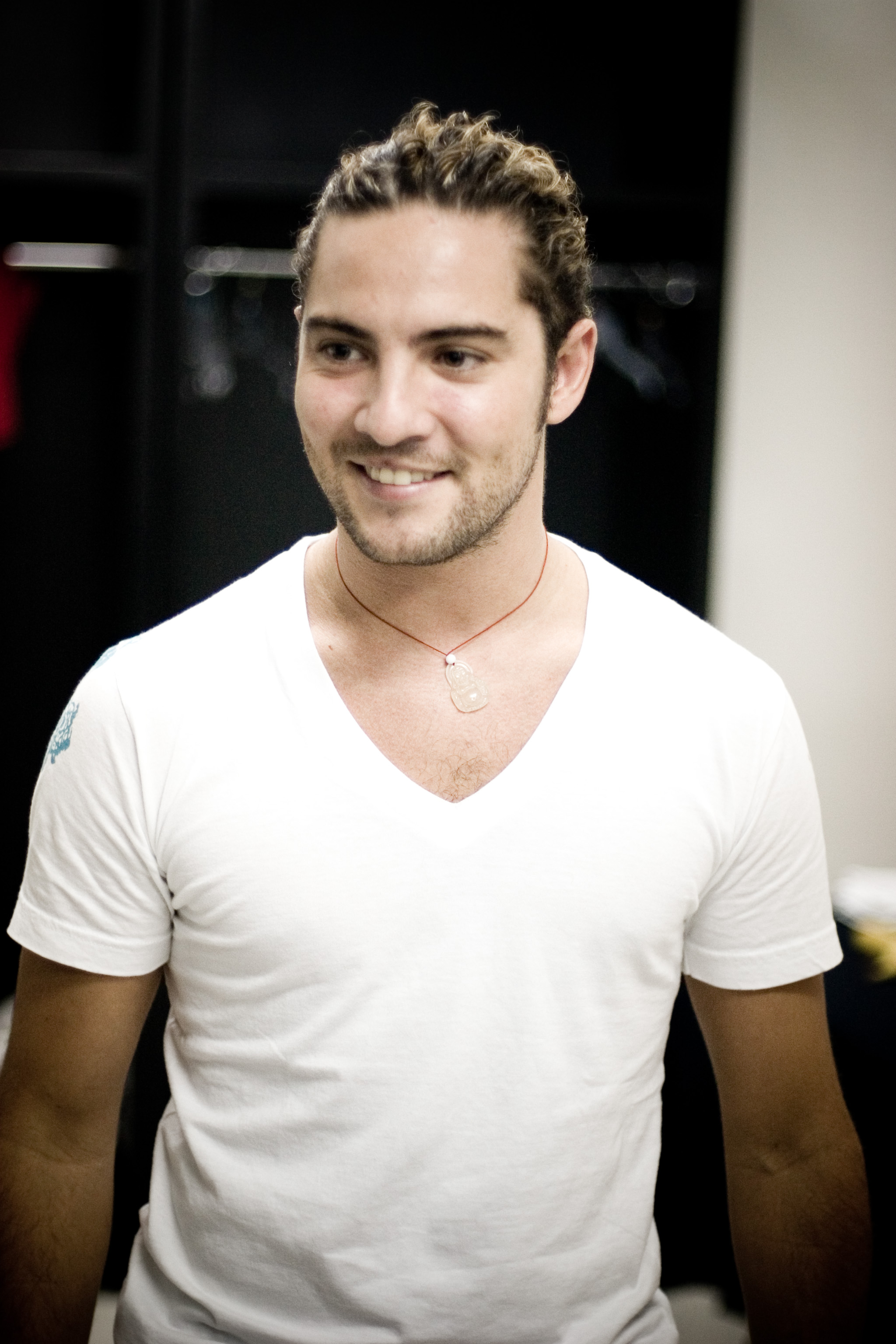
Spanish singer David Bisbal was the first winner of the award.

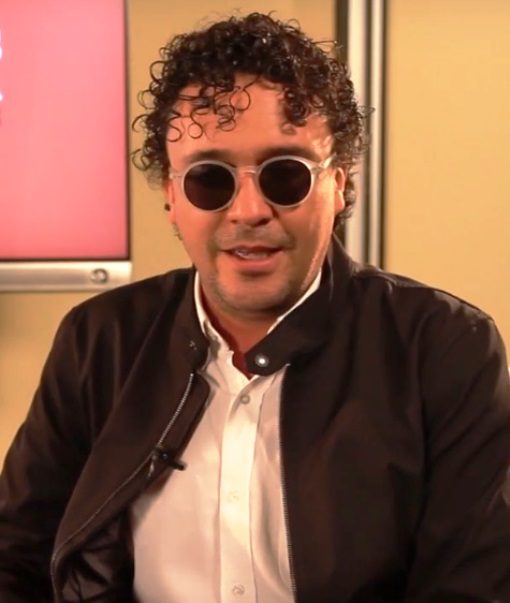
Four-time winner Andrés Cepeda.

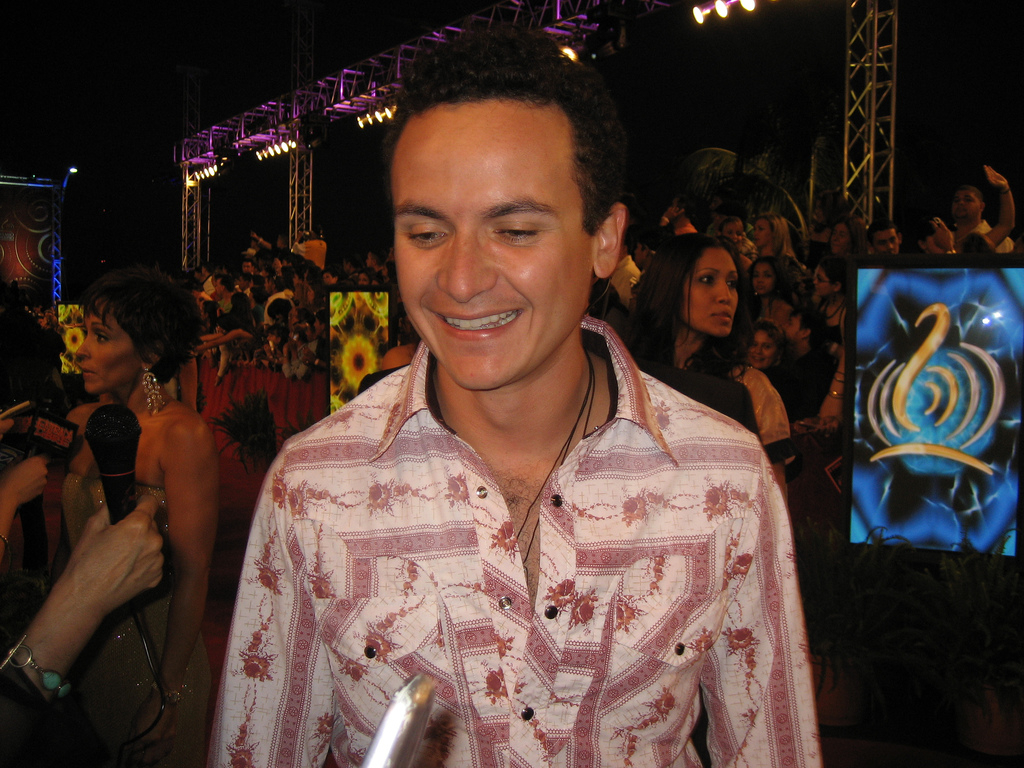
Three-time winner Fonseca.

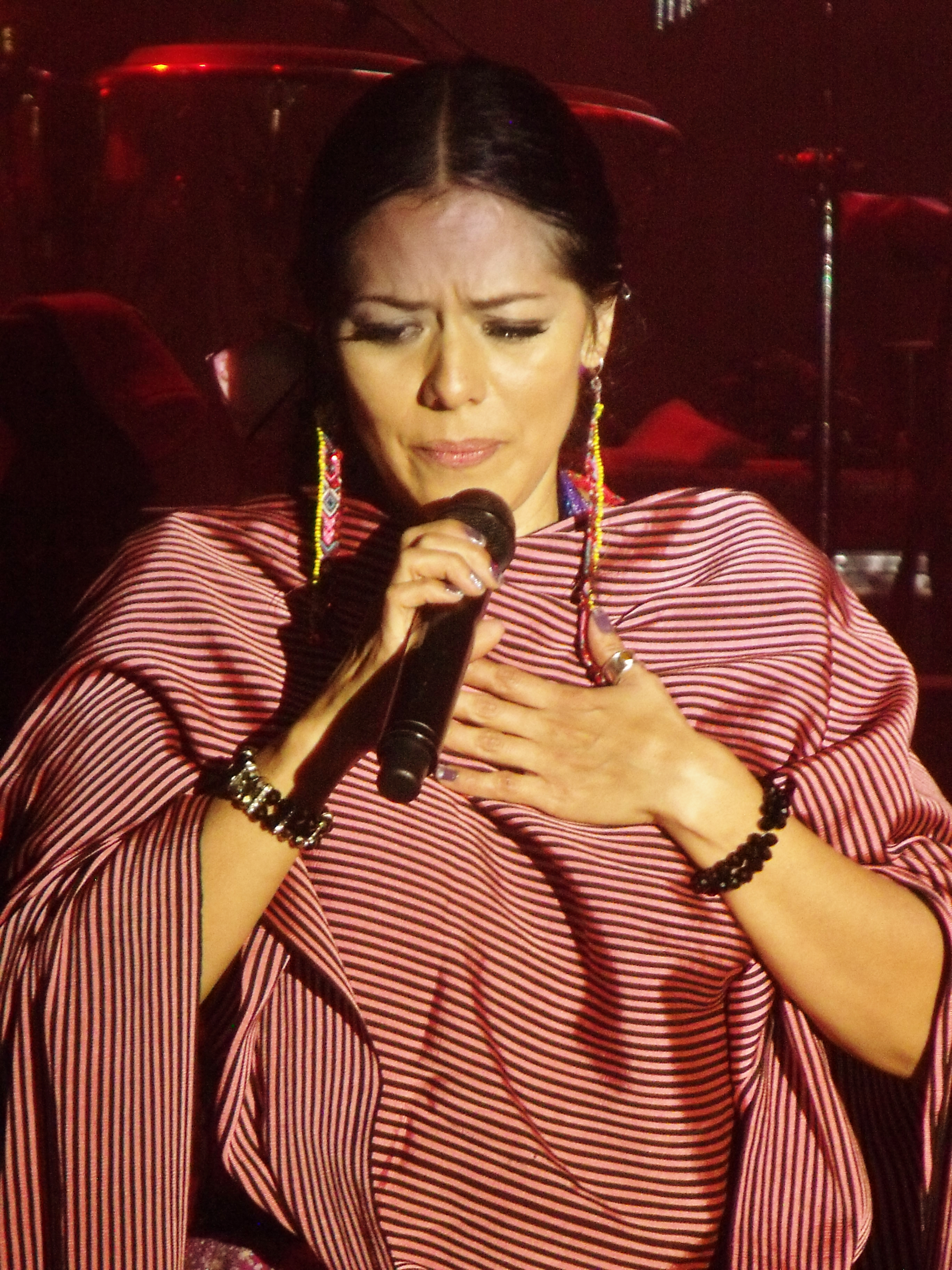
First female winner Lila Downs.

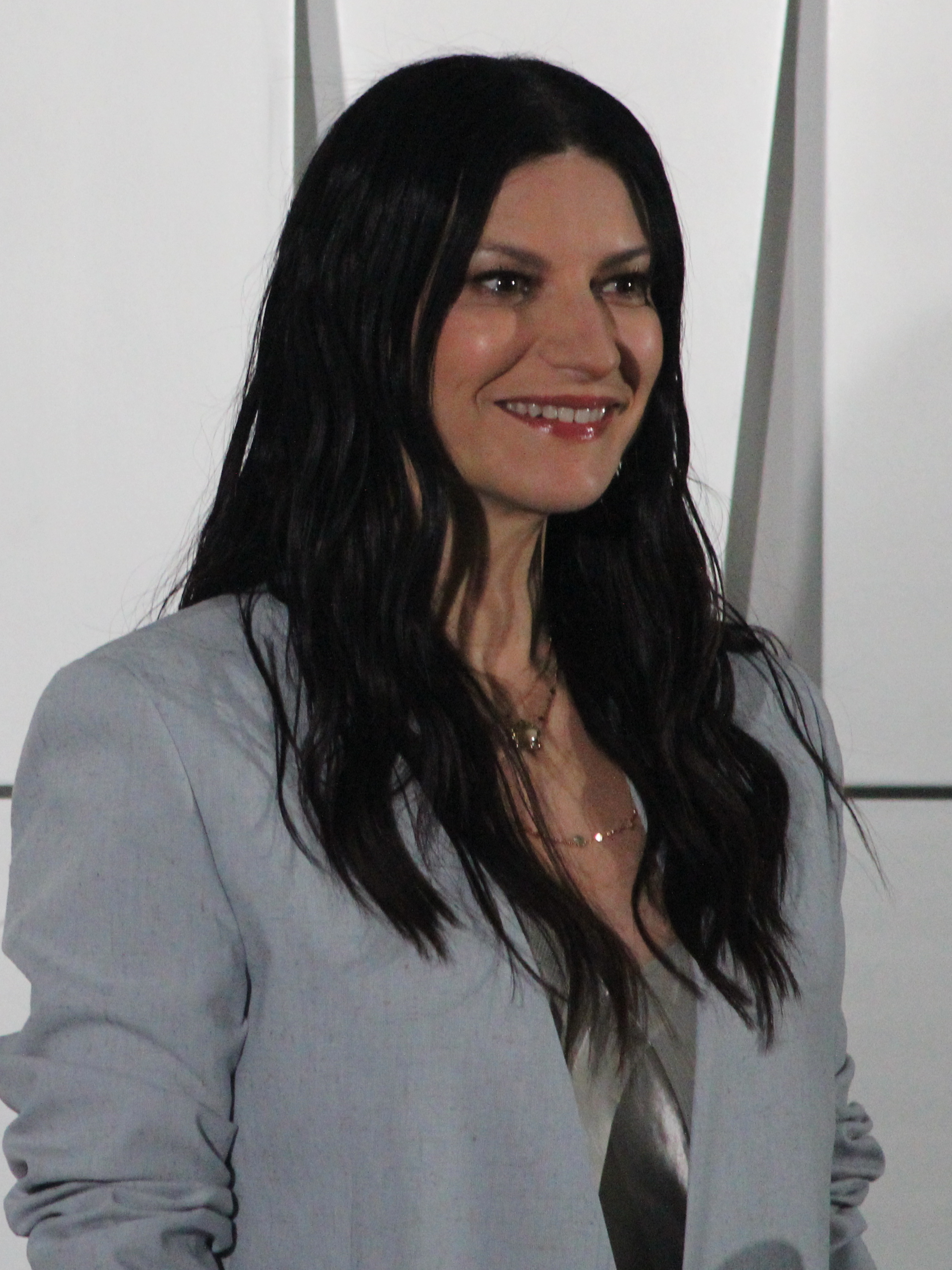
Two-time winner Laura Pausini.

Year	Performing artist(s)	Work	Nominees	Ref.
2012	David Bisbal	Una Noche en el Teatro Real	Pasión Vega – Sin Compasión; Presuntos Implicados – Banda Sonora; Sergio Dalma – Via Dalma II; Pepe Aguilar – Negociaré con la pena	
2013	Andrés Cepeda	Lo Mejor Que Hay En Mi Vida	Pablo Alborán – Tanto; Natalie Cole – Natalie Cole en Español; India Martínez – Otras Verdades; Ricardo Montaner – Viajero Frecuente	
2014	Fonseca and the National Symphony Orchestra of Colombia	Sinfónico	Andrea Bocelli – Amor En Portofino; Linda Briceño – Tiempo; Café Quijano – Orígenes: El Bolero Volumen 2; Marco Antonio Solís – Gracias Por Estar Aqui	
2015	Gilberto Santa Rosa	Necesito Un Bolero	Astrid Asher – Astrid Asher; Café Quijano – Orígenes: El Bolero Volumen 3; Mojito Lite – Nada Es Demasiado; Vicentico – Último Acto	
2016	Juan Gabriel	Los Dúo 2	Adrián – Lleno de Vida; Andrea Bocelli – Cinema (Edición en Español); Andrés Cepeda – Mil Ciudades; Diego Torres – Buena Vida	
2017	Lila Downs	Salón, Lágrimas y Deseo	Franco De Vita – Libre; Juan Gabriel – Vestido de Etiqueta por Eduardo Magallanes; Ednita Nazario – Una Vida; Yordano – El Tren de los Regresos	
2018	Laura Pausini	Hazte Sentir	Pablo Alborán – Prometo; Mojito Lite – Solo Los Buenos Momentos; Carla Morrison – Amor Supremo Desnudo; Nahuel Pennisi – Feliz	
2019	Fonseca	Agustín	Paula Arenas – Visceral; Cami – Rosa; Camila – Hacia Adentro; Pavel Núñez – Sentimientos	
2020	Andrés Cepeda and Fonseca	Compadres	Reyli Barba – La Metamorfosis; Andrés Cepeda – Trece; Gaby Moreno and Van Dyke Parks – ¡Spangled!; José Luis Perales – Mirándote a los Ojos	
2021	Juan Luis Guerra	Privé	Pablo Alborán – Vértigo; Paula Arenas – Mis Amores; Nella – Doce Margaritas; Diego Torres – Atlántico a Pie	
2022	Christina Aguilera	Aguilera	Fonseca – Viajante; Marta Gómez – Filarmónico 20 Años; Kurt – La Vida; Sin Bandera – Frecuencia	
2023	Andrés Cepeda	Décimo Cuarto	Paula Arenas – A Ciegas; Camilú – Que Me Duela; Manuel Carrasco – Corazón y Flecha; Vanesa Martín – Placeres y Pecados	
2024	Kany García	García	Diego El Cigala – Obras Maestras; Juliana – Mar Adentro; Gian Marco – Aún Me Sigo Encontrando; Laura Pausini – Almas Paralelas	
2025	Andrés Cepeda	Bogotá	Zoe Gotusso – Cursi; Jesse & Joy – Lo Que Nos Faltó Decir; Natalia Lafourcade – Natalia Lafourcade Live at Carnegie Hall; Raquel Sofía – Después de los 30	
2026	Laura Pausini	Yo canto 2	Amorío – Esteman & Daniela Spalla; Puerta Abierta – Kany García; TQ+ – Reik; Querida Yo – Yami Safdie	

== Most Wins ==
4 Wins

- Andrés Cepeda (one with Fonseca)

3 Wins

- Fonseca (one with the National Symphony Orchestra of Colombia and one with Andrés Cepeda)

2 Wins

- Laura Pausini

== Most Nominations ==
5 Nominations

- Andrés Cepeda (one with Fonseca)

4 Nominations

- Fonseca (one with the National Symphony Orchestra of Colombia and one with Andrés Cepeda)

3 Nominations

- Pablo Alborán
- Paula Arenas
- Laura Pausini

2 Nominations

- Andrea Bocelli
- Café Quijano
- Diego Torres
- Juan Gabriel
- Mojito Lite
- Kany García

== See also ==
- Latin Grammy Award for Best Contemporary Pop Vocal Album
