= Bonka (band) =

Colombian tropipop band founded in 2003

- Origin: Bogotá, Colombia
- Genres: Tropipop, Bangers
- Years active: 2003–2015
- Members: Gabriel Bonilla; Pablo Arango; Isabella Lorduy; Ana Maria Escallon
- Website: bonka.net (Spanish)

Bonka is a Colombian tropipop band that was founded in 2003 by Alejandro Gonzalez and Daniel Mora.

== History ==
Bonka was first formed in Bogotá when five school friends, Alejandro González, Daniel Mora, Nicolas Barake, Juan Barake and Felipe Harker discovered a shared passion for writing and performing music. They began meeting after school to write songs, and perform them in front of their friends later on. Eventually, other schools in the area began to request performances. These small cafeteria performances grew into larger gymnasium performances. Taking note of their increased popularity, national radio stations started playing Bonka music in full rotation.

== Career ==
"El problemón" was the first track David recorded for the band. After a few months after its launch, the song reached number one on Colombia's national charts. Their next track, "La Mona," reached the charts as well. These two songs are added to their first album Lo Que Nunca Nos Contamos. Other tracks include "Tarde de Abril", "La Visa", and "Hoy". The album reached record breaking status for sales volume within the first week, David had an important role for Bonka creating songs like "La Mona" and "Te Pediré" previously mentioned, the band then eventually achieved platinum status in Colombia.

The success of Lo Que Nunca Nos Contamos granted López, Gonzalez and Mora the opportunity to tour internationally and perform their Tropipop music in many countries including the United States, Ecuador, Peru, Costa Rica, Argentina, and Venezuela. They were both 16 years old at the time.

Subsequently, the band recorded their second album Más Que Ayer in Miami, which was produced Andrés Saavedra. Tracks include "La Era De La Gozadera", "Las estaciones Del Amor", and "Más Que Ayer". This time, the album achieved gold status in Colombia for its high volume of sales.

Soon after, the group recorded a new single entitled "Bien Cerquita", which features Dominican artist Fuego. The single achieved recognition, including a nomination for the official song of the largest TV network in Ecuador, as well as its selection by the Universal Music Spain as part of the 2012 Summer Hits album. Later in 2012, the band released another single, "Mis Ojos Lloran Por Ti", featuring fellow Colombian band Pasabordo. The success of these two singles led the group to be invited to perform at the "Evento 40", which was organized by Colombian radio station "40 Principales". They were also invited to perform at "Premios Nuestra Tierra 2012", where they received a nomination for "Tropical/Pop Group of the Year".

In 2013, Bonka released the single "A Escondidas" featuring Argentinean artist Jessi León. The song, which was written by Bonka lead singer Gonzalez and produced by Dandee (of Cali & el Dandee), had a promotional tour of over 20 cities throughout Colombia, Ecuador, and Guatemala. They also performed the song live at the "2013 Premios Nuestra Tierra" in Bogota.

== Discography ==
=== Albums ===
Year	Album title	Details	Track listing
2006	Lo Que Nunca Nos Contamos	Released: Label: Format: CD; Language: Spanish	Track listing: 1. "El Problemón"; 2. "La Mona"; 3. "Tarde de Abril"; 4. "La Visa"; 5. "Hoy"
2015	Más Que Ayer	Released: Producer: Andrés Saavedra; Format: CD; Language: Spanish	Track listing: 1. "La Era De La Gozadera"; 2. "Las estaciones Del Amor"; 3. "Más Que Ayer"

=== Singles ===
- "El Problemón" (Lo Que Nunca Nos Contamos album)
- "La Mona" (Lo Que Nunca Nos Contamos album)
- "Bien Cerquita"
- "Mis Ojos Lloran Por Ti" (2012)
- "A Escondidas" (2013)
- "Contigo" (2014)

== Accolades ==
=== Awards and nominations ===
- Winner: 2006 Shock Award for Best New Artist
- Winner: Shock Award for Overall Best Performance
- Winner: 2007 Premios Nuestra Tierra for Best Pop Group (five award nominations in total)
- Nominated: 2008 Premios Nuestra Tierra (three award nominations in total)
- Nominated: 2011 and 2012 Premios Nuestra Tierra for Best Pop Group
- Nominated: 2011 and 2012 Premios Shock for Best Pop Group
- Nominated: 2011 and 2012 Premios Luna for Best Pop Group
- Nominated: 2012 Premios Twitter for Best Tropical/Pop Group

=== Recognition ===
- Platinum recognition for debut album, Lo Que Nunca Nos Contamos
- Invited to perform at Colombian Independence festivals in Miami and New York alongside Fonseca
- Invited by the President of Colombia to be the representatives for "Más Arte Menos Minas"
- Single "Bien Cerquita" feat. Fuego reached top 10 in radio charts in both Colombia and Spain
- Chosen by the magazine Revista TU to judge their yearly contest of finding the next child star
- Performed new single "A Escondidas" live on The Voice Colombia
