= Alma (song) =

Promotional single by Fonseca

from the album Gratitud
- Released: June 3, 2008
- Length: 4:01
- Label: EMI Capitol
- Songwriters: Fonseca, Eduardo Murguia and Mauricio Arriaga

"Alma" (Soul), also known "Alma de Hierro" (Iron Heart), is a song by Colombian musician Fonseca. The song was written by Fonseca, Eduardo Murguia and Mauricio Arriaga for her third studio album, Gratitud (2008), while production was done by Wilfran Castillo. It was released on June 3, 2008, by EMI Capitol as the album's a promotional single. The song is a latin pop and tropipop. The song was used as opening theme of the Mexican soap opera Alma de hierro.

== Track listing ==
- Digital download
1. "Alma" – 4:01

== Credits and personnel ==
Credits adapted from Gratitud liner notes.

- Juan Fernando Fonseca – vocals, composer, guitar
- J. Eduardo Murguia – composer
- Mauricio L. Arriaga – composer, production
- Wilfran Castillo – production
- Tom Coyne – mastering engineer
- Iker Gastaminza – mixing engineer
- Boris Milan – mix engineer
