= Instinto (album) =

Studio album by Maia
- Released: April 25, 2012
- Genres: Latin pop, tropipop
- Language: Spanish
- Label: Sony Music Latin

Maia chronology
| Natural (2005) | Instinto (2012) |

Instinto (Instinct) is the third album by Colombian singer-songwriter Maía, released by Sony Music on April 25, 2012.

== Track listing ==
| No. | Title | Writer(s) | Length |
|---|---|---|---|
| 1. | "Antídoto" | | 3:04 |
| 2. | "No Quererte" | | 3:19 |
| 3. | "Hoy" | Prado | 3:46 |
| 4. | "Aniversario" | Prado | 3:27 |
| 5. | "He Tenido Que Aprender" (Bossa Nova version) | Prado | 3:42 |
| 6. | "Mi Canto" | Loewy, Prado | 3:49 |
| 7. | "Abecedario" | Loewy, Prado | 3:36 |
| 8. | "Si Fuera Siempre Abril" | Prado | 3:23 |
| 9. | "Oye Mi Amor" | Pineda | 3:33 |
| 10. | "Ángel" | Prado | 4:06 |
| 11. | "Promesa" | Loewy, Prado | 3:41 |

== Awards ==
On September 25, 2012, the album received a Latin Grammy Award nomination as Best Contemporary Tropical Album.

| Year | Nominee / work | Award | Result |
|---|---|---|---|
| 2012 | Instinto | Latin Grammy Award for Best Contemporary Tropical Album | Nominated |
