= Ilusión (Fonseca album) =

Studio album by Fonseca
- Released: September 30, 2011
- Recorded: 2009–2011
- Genre: Latin Pop; tropipop
- Length: 55:41
- Label: Sony Music Latin; Sony Music Colombia
- Producer: Bernardo Ossa; Andres Levin

Fonseca albums chronology
Live Bogotá (2010)	Ilusión (2011)	Grandes Éxitos (2013)

Singles from Ilusión
- 1. "Desde Que No Estás" Released: August 22, 2011; 2. "Eres Mi Sueño" Released: November 30, 2011; 3. "Ay Amor" Released: August 31, 2012; 4. "Si Te Acuerdas De Mi" Released: June 19, 2013; 5. "Prometo" Released: November 2013

Ilusión (English: Illusion) is the fourth album by Colombian singer-songwriter Fonseca, released by Sony Music on September 30, 2011. The album was produced by Andres Levin and Bernardo Ossa. The songs are mostly inspired by the different feelings related to the enthusiasm and joy of love, and musically the album is Latin Pop influenced Tropipop.

The album's lead single, "Desde Que No Estás" was released August 22, 2011, only in some Latin American countries, and reached the top ten in these. The second single, "Eres Mi Sueño", was released on November 30, 2011, and was released in United States on June 19 of the following year. The song peaked the number one in Colombia, and the number fifteen in Latin Songs. The third single "Ay Amor" was released on August 31, 2012.

To support the album, Fonseca went a radio/television promotion spree, a tour in Colombia sponsored by Grupo Exito, was the opening act for the Gigantes Tour in Latin America and some cities of United States. The album was nominated in two categories in the Latin Grammy Awards of 2012, winning the category as Best Tropical Fusion Album.

== Recording and production ==
The album was recorded between Bogotá and New York City. Fonseca told to the newspaper El Espectador that with the album he feels more toned with the current sound and that paternity influenced in the music. The album was produced by Bernardo Ossa, with whom he had already worked; and Andres Levin. The Mexican duo Jesse y Joy is the guest artist, their collaboration appear on the album, featuring in the fourth track "Soledad". Of the collaboration Fonseca praised the duo, said that Jesse is a great guitarist and musician. While that describe his sister like "One of the best latin american voices in this moment".

During the release of the album, a newspaper ask him: "What moment of his life born this record work?", Fonseca answered "Is my fourth album and arises in a good important moment, because with each album feel that have learned something. With this production feel me more toned with the current music. Also the fact of have been father in my music, the environment." In an interview in Puerto Rico, Fonseca explained: "The illusion is something like gasoline, that we always need it. And so, the same with illusion, the dreams, the feelings, objectives, hope, the faith that we need for the life" and express that the birth of his daughter it has hopeful.

== Critical reception ==
Professional ratings
Review scores
Source	Rating
About.com	4.5/5 stars
El Riviguer	8,7/10

Ilusión has received different reviews from critics. At About.com's Carlos Quintana opined that "With its unique combination of sounds and elegant melodies, Ilusion has redefined the music of Fonseca adding to the Latin music world a production where Tropical and Pop music blend perfectly". On the review of Luis Nuñez of El Riviguer wrote that "This album is an interesting fusion of Tropical pop according to the categorization that the critics give to this little explored subgenre, recognizing its great influences of Colombian pop (tropipop) ranging from the vallenato music until traditional joropo". At the Chicago Sun-Times, the journalist Laura Emerick selected the album Ilusión as among the 10 best Latin music albums of 2012, writing: "Moving away from the shadow of early influence Carlos Vives, a fellow Colombian vallenato revivalist, the singer-songwriter conjures up more Latin pop confections, especially the dreamy lead track (Eres Mi Sueño)".

== Promotion ==
In September 2011 Fonseca offered a benefic concert in Bogotá, that tried to gather money to finance a project of rebuilding schools affected by the last rainy season, in Colombia. The project was held in the town of Santa Cruz de Mompox, Bolivar. He said about: "I'm so happy to can support Colombia Humanitaria. After the winter there are many things in the country that must return to normal and the country need us". The different medias in Colombia, related as Fonseca gave illusion to kids. One month later he begin the Tour Exito 2011 under the Colombian company Grupo Exito. Crossing more the 15 cities for 17 performances during six weeks. He performed several songs of the album as: "Los Buenos Milagros", "Desde Que No Estás and many others. The tour started on October 21 in Envigado, and finished on December 4 in the city of Cartagena.

Fonseca begin with the Ilusion World Tour supporting his fourth album Ilusión, which was due to begin on September 12, 2012. The two acts in America Central are part of Gigantes Tour by the singers Marc Anthony and Chayanne. The date scheduled for Costa Rica was postponed for September 30 due to locking on the road in Nicaragua, because of a Salvadoran strike. The three acts on Australia is featuring with the musician Willie Colón, the second act (in Brisbane) is part of the Clave Contra Clave (Latin Live Competition) as finale act.

=== Singles ===
"Desde Que No Estás" was released as the first official single only in Latin America. Is the second single of the album in United States. And had its premiere on iTunes August 22, 2011. The song was nominated as Best Tropical Song in the Latin Grammy Awards of 2012. In February 2013 the song reached No. 3 on the US Tropical Airplay.

"Eres Mi Sueño", was released first on November 30, 2011 in Colombia and more late in United States on June 19, 2012. Is the second single of the album and the lead single in United States. The single peaked at no.15 on the US Latin Songs Chart and no.4 on the US Tropical Airplay.

"Ay Amor" was released as third single on August 31, 2012 on radio. Previously the song was released in digital music stores on October 9 in the same year, with a new version of the song, some dance, produced by Maffio Alkatraks. In Colombia had a good reception in the charts, peaked at no.20 in the National-Report.

"Si Te Acuerdas De Mi" will be released as fourth single.

== Track listing ==
No.	Title	Writer(s)	Producer(s)	Length
1.	"Eres Mi Sueño"	Maffio Alkatraks, Juan Fernando Fonseca	Bernardo Ossa, Fonseca	3:15
2.	"Los Buenos Milagros"	Descemer Bueno, Fonseca	Bernardo Ossa, Fonseca	3:39
3.	"Ilusión"	Juan Fernando Fonseca	Bernardo Ossa, Fonseca	3:32
4.	"Soledad" (featuring Jesse y Joy)	Andres Cabas, Fonseca	Andres Levin, Andrés Cabas, Fonseca	3:58
5.	"Desde Que No Estás"	Alejandro Bassi, Fonseca	Bernardo Ossa, Fonseca	3:34
6.	"Ay Amor"	Juan Fernando Fonseca	Andres Levin, Fonseca	3:21
7.	"Historia de Amor"	Marlene Aragón Mandiola	Bernardo Ossa, Fonseca	4:12
8.	"Abcdario"	Juan Fernando Fonseca	Andres Levin, Fonseca	4:03
9.	"Si Te Acuerdas De Mi"	Wilfran Castillo, Fonseca	Bernardo Ossa, Fonseca	3:31
10.	"Tu Amor Ya Sabe"	Claudia Brant, Fonseca	Bernardo Ossa, Juan Andrés Otalora, Fonseca	4:02
11.	"Como Duele"	Fonseca, Andres Levin	Andres Levin, Fonseca	4:14
12.	"Baila Esta Ultima"	Andrés Acosta, Fonseca	Bernardo Ossa, Fonseca	3:44
Total length:				48:38

Ilusión + bonus tracks
No.	Title	Writer(s)	Producer(s)	Length
1.	"Cuando Respiro En Tu Boca"	Claudio Valenzuela	Andres Levin, Santiago Muñoz, Fonseca	3:33
2.	"Prometo"	Johana Caicedo, Fonseca	Ricardo Torres, Fonseca	3:39
3.	"Eres Mi Sueño" (acoustic)	Maffio Alkatraks, Juan Fernando Fonseca	Fonseca	3:58
Total length:				59:48

== Charts and sales ==
=== Weekly charts ===
Chart (2011–2012)	Peak position
Colombian Albums	1
US Tropical Albums	11

=== Sales and certifications ===
Region	Certification	Certified units/sales
Colombia (ASINCOL)	9× Platinum	180,000
Venezuela (APFV)	Gold	5,000

== Awards and nominations ==
Year	Award	Nominated work	Category	Result	References
2012	Latin Grammy Award	"Ilusión+"	Best Tropical Fusion Album	Won	
2012	Latin Grammy Award	"Desde Que No Estás"	Best Tropical Song	Nominated	
2012	Grammy Award	"Ilusión"	Best Latin Pop Album	Nominated	

== Release history ==
Region	Date	Label	Catalog
Colombia	September 30, 2011	Sony Music Entertainment	88697982332
United States	June 17, 2012	Sony Music Entertainment	
Venezuela	September 30, 2011	Sony Music Entertainment	
Spain	April 16, 2013	Sony Music Entertainment	
