= Lucybell =

Chilean rock band

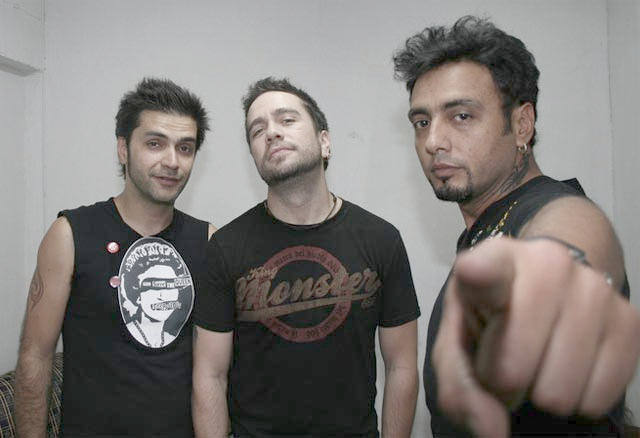

Background information
- Origin: Santiago, Chile
- Genre: Alternative rock
- Years active: 1991-present
- Labels: EMI Odeón Chile (1994-1999); Warner Music Chile (1999-2005); Warner Music México (2005-2007); El Escarabajo (2007- 2009); CHV (2010-); Independiente (2012-)
- Members: Claudio Valenzuela; Eduardo Caces; Cote Foncea
- Past members: Francisco González (1991-2005); Marcelo Muñoz (1991-1999); Gabriel Vigliensoni (1991-1999)
- Website: lucybell.com

Lucybell is a Chilean rock band formed by four students from the Universidad de Chile's Faculty of Art in 1991, in Santiago de Chile. The original four members were:

- Francisco González: drums, bass, percussion, keyboards (1991–2005)
- Marcelo Muñoz: bass, acoustic guitar, keyboards (1991–2000)
- Claudio Valenzuela: lead voice and composer, electric guitar (1991-)
- Gabriel Vigliensoni: keyboards (1991–2000)

Marcelo Muñoz and Gabriel Vigliesoni left the band shortly before the recording of the album Amanece in early 2000. Eduardo Caces (bass) joined shortly after, becoming a permanent member of the band ever since. Francisco Gonzalez then left in 2005, leading to the immediate arrival of Cote Foncea (drums), of the now defunct Chilean rock band Dracma. In the wake of these inner turmoils, the band managed to issue their fifth studio album "Lúmina", which displayed the new direction the band was taking - a rawer guitar-driven sound, moving away from the previous programmed and synth-friendly tunes. A year earlier the EP "Sálvame la Vida" was the prelude to this evolution, it included the first "Lúmina" single along with some cover songs released in tribute albums and a contribution to a movie soundtrack. The group, currently composed of Valenzuela, Caces and Foncea, recently signed with Warner Mexico and released their most recent work, "Comiendo Fuego". At the end of the year 2007, the band recorded by their own means the EP "Primitivo", following the "do it yourself" indie music aesthetics.

== Discography ==
=== Studio albums ===
- Peces (1995)
- Viajar (1996)
- Lucybell (1998)
- Amanece (2000)
- Lúmina (2004)
- Comiendo Fuego (2006)
- Fénix (2010)
- Magnético (2017)
- Mil Caminos (2020)

=== EPs ===
- Mataz (1996)
- Sálvame la Vida (2003)
- Primitivo (2007)
- Poderoso (2013)

=== Live albums ===
- Sesión Futura (2001)
- Sesión Primitiva (2008)

=== Compilations ===
- Grandes éxitos (2000)
- Todos sus éxitos (2003)
- Aquí y Ahora (Lo mejor de) Lucybell (2007)

== Members ==
- Claudio Valenzuela – lead vocals, lead guitar. (1991–Present)
- Eduardo Caces – bass guitar, rhythm guitar, keyboards. (1999–Present )
- Cote Foncea – drums and percussion, rhythm guitars. (2005–Present )

=== Past members ===
- Marcelo Muñoz – bass guitar, rhythm & lead guitars. (1991–1999)
- Gabriel Vigliensoni – keyboards, rhythm guitars. (1991–1999)
- Francisco González – drums and percussion, bass guitar, rhythm & lead guitars. (1991–2005)
