= Entre Mi Vida y la Tuya =

Single by Fonseca
- Released: June 2, 2015
- Genre: Latin pop
- Length: 3:52
- Label: Handy Music

Fonseca singles chronology
"Tu Amor Ya Sabe" (2014)	"Entre Mi Vida y la Tuya" (2015)

"Entre Mi Vida y la Tuya" ("Between My Life and Your Life") is a song by Colombia singer Fonseca. Is the lead single for the Fonseca's upcoming fifth studio album.

== Charts ==
Chart (2015)	Peak position
Colombia (National-Report)	14
US Hot Latin Songs (Billboard)	49
US Latin Airplay (Billboard)	38
