= Una y Otra Vez (Sergent Garcia album) =

Studio album by Sergent Garcia
- Released: March 22, 2011 US
- Genres: Reggae, Salsa, Latin, Ska
- Label: Cumbancha

Una y Otra Vez (Once and Again) is a studio album released by Sergent Garcia. It received a Latin Grammy nomination for Best Tropical Fusion Album.

== Track List ==
No.	Title	Length
1.	"Una y Otra Vez"	3:59
2.	"Yo Soy Salsamuffin"	3:54
3.	"Chacun Son Combat"	4:13
4.	"Ojos Inocentes"	3:29
5.	"Mi Son Mi Friend"	4:14
6.	"Meme Si"	4:18
7.	"Vasito De Agua"	4:34
8.	"El Baile Del Diablo"	4:00
9.	"En Mi Mochila"	4:31
10.	"Brujeria"	4:45
11.	"Bolero Nuevo"	5:13
12.	"To Mi To Mi"	3:43
13.	"Acho Bai Bai"	4:07
14.	"En El Domino"	1:38
