= Sergent Garcia =

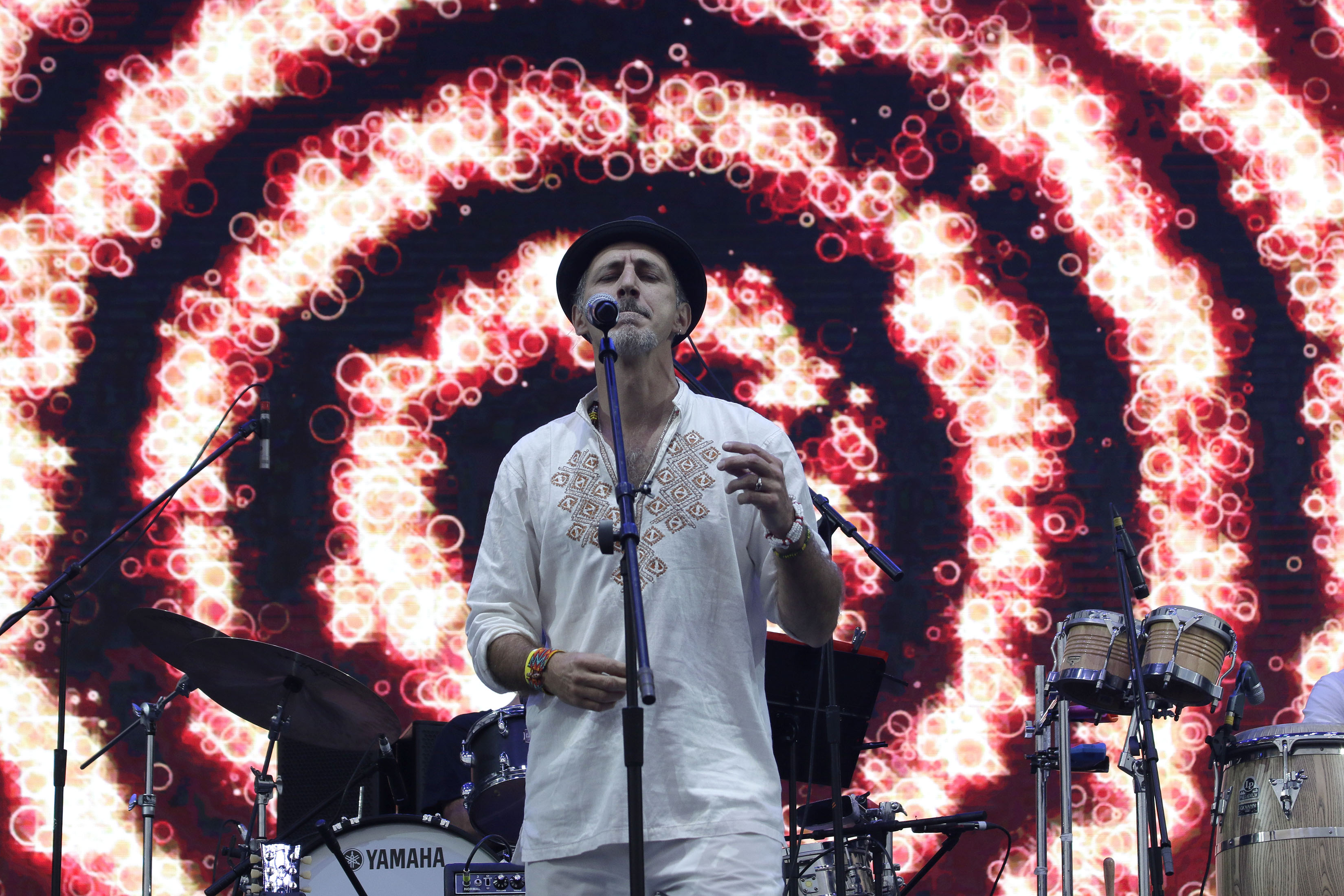
- Sergent Garcia at a concert in Mexico City in 2019

Background information
- Born: Bruno Garcia; 1964 (age 61–62)
- Origin: France
- Genres: World music, Latin, reggae, Caribbean, hip hop
- Label: Cumbancha
- Website: www.sergentgarcia.com

Sergent Garcia is the band formed around French singer Bruno Garcia (1964, France) who had previously been the guitarist of punk band Ludwig Von 88.

Sergent Garcia's music is a mixture of cumbia, reggae, salsa, ragamuffin, rock and other trends in a new style which he defines as salsamuffin.

He published in 2011 his sixth studio album, Una y otra vez (Cumbancha/The Gwagwita), recorded between France, Spain, Cuba and Colombia.

In 2023, he released a single, entitled “¡Cuando Salga El Sol!”, accompanied by a video in 2024. Also in 2024, he embarked on a tour, entitled the “Salsamuffin Tour” to celebrate 25 years as a solo artist.

== Discography ==
- Viva el Sergento (1997)
- Un poquito quema'o (1999)
- Sin Fronteras (2001)
- La Semilla Escondida (2003)
- Best Of (compilation) (2004)
- Mascaras (2006)
- Cumbiamuffin (EP) (2009)
- Una y Otra Vez (2011)
- Anthologie (2006–2010)
- Contre Vents Et Marées (2015)
- ¡Cuando Salga El Sol! (2023)
