= Desde Que No Estás =

Single by Fonseca

from the album Ilusión
- Released: August 22, 2011
- Length: 3:32
- Label: Sony Music Latin
- Songwriters: Alejandro Bassi, Juan Fernando Fonseca

Fonseca singles chronology
"Estar Lejos" (2009)	"Desde Que No Estás" (2011)	"Eres Mi Sueño" (2011)

"Desde Que No Estás" (English: Since That You Are Not) is a Latin pop song by Colombian recording artist Fonseca. Is the lead single from his fourth studio album Ilusión (2011). It was released on August 22, 2011. The song was nominated in the category Best Tropical Song on the Latin Grammy Awards of 2012.

== Track listing ==
iTunes digital download
No.	Title	Writer(s)	Producer(s)	Length
1.	"Desde Que No Estás"	Alejandro Bassi, Juan Fernando Fonseca	Bernardo Ossa	3:32

== Credits and personnel ==
Recording

- Recorded at Ozone Studios, Bogotá, Colombia.

Personnel

- Songwriting – Juan Fernando Fonseca
- Production – Bernardo Ossa
- Vocal engineering and recording – Bernardo Ossa
- Music recording – Bernardo Ossa and Juan Fernando Fonseca
- Assistant vocal recording – Juan Fernando Fonseca
- Mixing – Boris Milán

Credits adapted from the liner notes of Ilusión, Sony Music Latin, 10 Music.

== Charts ==
=== Weekly charts ===
Chart (2011–2012)	Peak position
Colombia (National-Report)	7
US Latin Airplay (Billboard)	45
US Tropical Airplay (Billboard)	3

=== Year-end charts ===
Chart (2013)	Position
US Latin Tropical Airplay	29

== Release history ==
Region	Date	Format	Label
Colombia	August 22, 2011	Digital Download	Sony Music Entertainment
Mexico	August 22, 2011	Digital Download	Sony Music Entertainment
