= Gratitud =

Studio album by Fonseca
- Released: May 27, 2008
- Genre: Latin Pop
- Label: EMI Capitol

Fonseca albums chronology
Corazón (2005)	Gratitud (2008)	Live Bogotá (2010)

Singles from Gratitud
- 1. "Enrédame" Released: April 22, 2008; 2. "Arroyito" Released: May 27, 2008; 3. "Paraíso" Released: 2009; 4. "Estar Lejos" Released: December 31, 2010

Gratitud (Gratitude) is the third album by Colombian singer-songwriter Fonseca, released by EMI Capitol on May 27, 2008.

== Album information ==
This album mixes tropical rhythms with urban sounds. He cites the influence for had been born in a capital city from Bogotá, Colombia; very far from the sea. The style of the album includes pure vallenato, latin pop and disco in a unique fusion. At the same time, he shows us a great duality in his lyrics, from deep melancholy by that got way and the happiness from the party. His debut on the U.S. Latin Albums charts was in the position number seventy, only least one week. On the U.S. Tropical Albums chart her higher position was the number nine.

== Track listing ==
No.	Title	Writer(s)	Length
1.	"Arroyito ("Little Creek")"	Wilfran Castillo	3:58
2.	"Catalina"	Juan Fernando Fonseca, Alejandro Aponte	4:05
3.	"Como Te Extraño"	Fonseca	4:07
4.	"Enrédame"	Fonseca	3:54
5.	"Beautiful Sunshine"	Fonseca	5:17
6.	"Sabré Olvidar" (acoustic)	Fonseca	3:42
7.	"Gratitud"	Fonseca, Hermides Manzano	3:46
8.	"San José"	Fonseca, Aponte	4:43
9.	"Paraíso"	Fonseca	4:17
10.	"Perdón"	Alejandro Bassi	4:12
11.	"Confiésame 2008"	Fonseca	4:59
12.	"Alma"	Fonseca, J. Eduardo Murguia, Mauricio L. Arriaga	3:51
13.	"Enrédame" (acoustic)	Fonseca	3:19

Especial Edition
No.	Title	Length
1.	"Arroyito" (acoustic)	3:32
2.	"Gratitud" (acoustic)	4:20
3.	"Estar Lejos" (featuring Willie Colón)	4:06
4.	"Quiero Saber"	4:11
5.	"Confiésame" (DEMO)	4:53
6.	"Alma" (DEMO)	3:39
7.	"Paraíso" (DEMO)	3:40

== Credits and personnel ==
Credits adapted from Gratitud liner notes.

- Juan Fernando Fonseca – vocals, composer, guitar
- Richard Bravo – drums, drum kit
- Wilfran Castillo – composer
- David Castro – vocals
- Tom Coyne – mastering engineer
- Enrique "Kike" Cuao – guache, percussion
- Pablo Garcia – photography
- Iker Gastaminza – mix engineer
- Alejandro Gómez Cáceras – guitar (acoustic)
- Lee Levin – drums
- Hermides "Taty" Manzano – composer
- Boris Milan – mix engineer
- Bernardo Ossa – keyboards, palms, programming, recording, sampling
- Luis Angel Pastor – bass guitar
- Tony Peluso – mix engineer
- Alfredo Rosado – wood block, guacharaca

== Charts ==
Chart (2008)	Peak position
Mexican Albums Chart	61
US Top Latin Albums	70
US Tropical Albums	9
