= Eres Mi Sueño =

Single by Fonseca

from the album Ilusión
- Released: November 30, 2011
- Genre: Latin pop
- Length: 3:29
- Label: Sony Music Latin
- Songwriters: Maffio Alkatraks, Juan Fernando Fonseca

Fonseca singles chronology
"Desde Que No Estás" (2011)	"Eres Mi Sueño" (2011)	"Ay Amor" (2012)

"Eres Mi Sueño" (English: You Are My Dream) is a Latin pop song by Colombian recording artist Fonseca. It was released as the second single from his fourth studio album Ilusión (2012). The song was released for radio on November 30, 2011 in Colombia. After was released as digital download on June 19, 2012 in United States. The music video of the song is available in the different video platforms from May 23, 2012.

== Song information ==
The song was written by himself and Maffio Alkatraks and produced by Bernardo Ossa and Fonseca. The song has described as "caribbean merengue" according to Fonseca in an interview with the newspaper El Espectador.

Basically it tells the grand love that he has to that person, that doesn't be of him. Is a love dedication. He describes his boundaries and scopes that he can reach just for be with her. In the chorus, he sing "Sueño" (Dream) and after reaffirms that she is his dream and the lyrics in the final of the chorus "No soy tu dueño, solo quiero abrazarte" (I'm not your owner, i just want to hold you), means that she isn't of him and for some reason don't be together.

An album remix for the song features co-writer Maffio and Cuban-American singer Nayer.

== Music video ==
The music video for "Eres Mi Sueño" was shot in set of recording in Bogotá, Colombia. The director of the video was Pablo García. Fonseca released the music video on his VEVO and YouTube channel on May 23, 2012. The video starts with Fonseca and his band on set of recording playing dancing to the sound of the drums, then when begin the electronic intro of the song the band begin to play corresponding instruments and Fonseca plays the guitar very excitedly. After, there are many jacks of the different members of the band playing their instrument. Back of the assembly there is a giant screen that lights the set of recording, with light red and white color. The floor is wet and there is a rail for the camera, where serve for many jacks during the music video. There are cables, Fonseca's microphone cable is red phosphorescent. To the end, all the lights turn off. As of December 2022, the video has received over 283 million views on YouTube.

== Track listing ==
- Digital download
1. "Eres Mi Sueño" – 3:29

== Credits and personnel ==
Recording

- Recorded at Ozone Studios, Bogotá, Colombia.

Personnel

- Songwriting – Juan Fernando Fonseca, Maffio Alkatraks
- Production – Bernardo Ossa
- Vocal engineering and recording – Bernardo Ossa
- Music recording – Bernardo Ossa
- Assistant vocal recording – Juan Fernando Fonseca
- Mixing – Iker Gastaminza

Credits adapted from the liner notes of Ilusión, Sony Music Latin, 10 Music.

== Charts ==
=== Weekly charts ===
Chart (2012)	Peak position
Colombia (National-Report)	5
US Hot Latin Songs (Billboard)	15
US Latin Pop Airplay (Billboard)	11
US Tropical Airplay (Billboard)	4

=== Year-end charts ===
Chart (2012)	Position
US Latin Songs	73
US Latin Pop Songs	41
US Latin Tropical Airplay	25

== Release history ==
Region	Date	Format	Label
Colombia	November 30, 2011	Radio	Sony Music Entertainment
United States	June 19, 2012	Digital Download	Sony Music Entertainment
Spain	April 2, 2013	Digital Download	Sony Music Entertainment
