= Fonseca (album) =

Studio album by Fonseca
- Released: February 2002
- Genre: Latin Pop
- Label: Líderes, EMI Colombia

Fonseca albums chronology
| Bomba de Tiempo (1997) | Fonseca (2002) | Corazón (2005) |

Fonseca is the debut studio album by Colombian recording artist Fonseca released in February 2002 in Colombia by Líderes Entertainment Group. In 2005 was released by EMI Colombia. The album features the hit singles "Magangue", "Confiésame" and "Noche de Carnaval".

== Album information ==
When Fonseca was searching to get the representation of a label, he found the Colombian musician José Gaviria and helped him in an initial recording with Sonolux five years before. In 2002, he signed with the label Líderes for making three albums. The album according to Colombian newspaper El Tiempo said that is a great debut and it's so influenced by Carlos Vives. The song "Sueño" catches from the start, and "Noche de Carnaval" and "Magangué" are the typical parties songs that can't fail on a pop disc. The Fonseca's voice is uncommon and shows that knows as use it. The most successful song was "Magangué".

Fonseca's self-titled debut gained him considerable attention in Colombia, including the notice of artists Shakira and Juanes, both of whom offered him subsequent collaboration and performance opportunities. Sharing the stage with Shakira on her Tour of the Mongoose and Juanes at Estadio El Campín in Bogotá garnered Fonseca the recognition and momentum he would need for his second album.

== Track listing ==
| No. | Title | Writer(s) | Length |
|---|---|---|---|
| 1. | "Magangue" | Fonseca, Juan de Luque | 4:21 |
| 2. | "Confiésame" | Fonseca | 4:03 |
| 3. | "Noche de Carnaval" | Fonseca | 3:45 |
| 4. | "Sueño" | Fonseca | 4:11 |
| 5. | "Arrepentida" | Fonseca | 4:19 |
| 6. | "La Misma Nota" | Fonseca | 3:46 |
| 7. | "Melancolía del Ayer" | Fonseca | 3:52 |
| 8. | "Con una Botella" | Fonseca | 3:33 |
| 9. | "Lina" | Juan de Luque | 4:15 |
| 10. | "No Se Si Pueda" | Fonseca | 4:27 |
| 11. | "Tunel Irracional" | Fonseca | 3:50 |
| 12. | "Noche de Carnaval" | Fonseca | 4:10 |
