= Mauricio & Palodeagua =

Colombian tropical music band

Mauricio & Palo de Agua
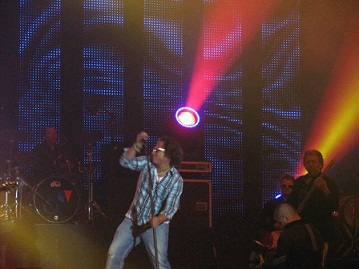
- Live concert in 2013

Background information
- Origin: Bogotá, Colombia
- Genres: Tropical music
- Years active: 2003–present
- Members: Mauricio Rodríguez

Mauricio & Palo de Agua is a Colombian tropical music band fronted by singer Mauricio Rodríguez. Starting in 2003, they have released three albums. They have had numerous hits in Colombian radio as well as some moderate international successes. Some of their notable songs are "Niña", "Canto Caribeño", "Dame tu amor", "Esa Muchachita", and "Viernes".

They were nominated for the Latin Grammy Awards of 2004 in the category "Best New Artist" but lost to Maria Rita. They were nominated again for the Latin Grammy Awards of 2009 in the category "Best Tropical Song".

== Discography ==
- Un Canto Caribeño (2004)
- Contigo (2006)
- Viernes (2008)
