= Foncea =

- Municipality
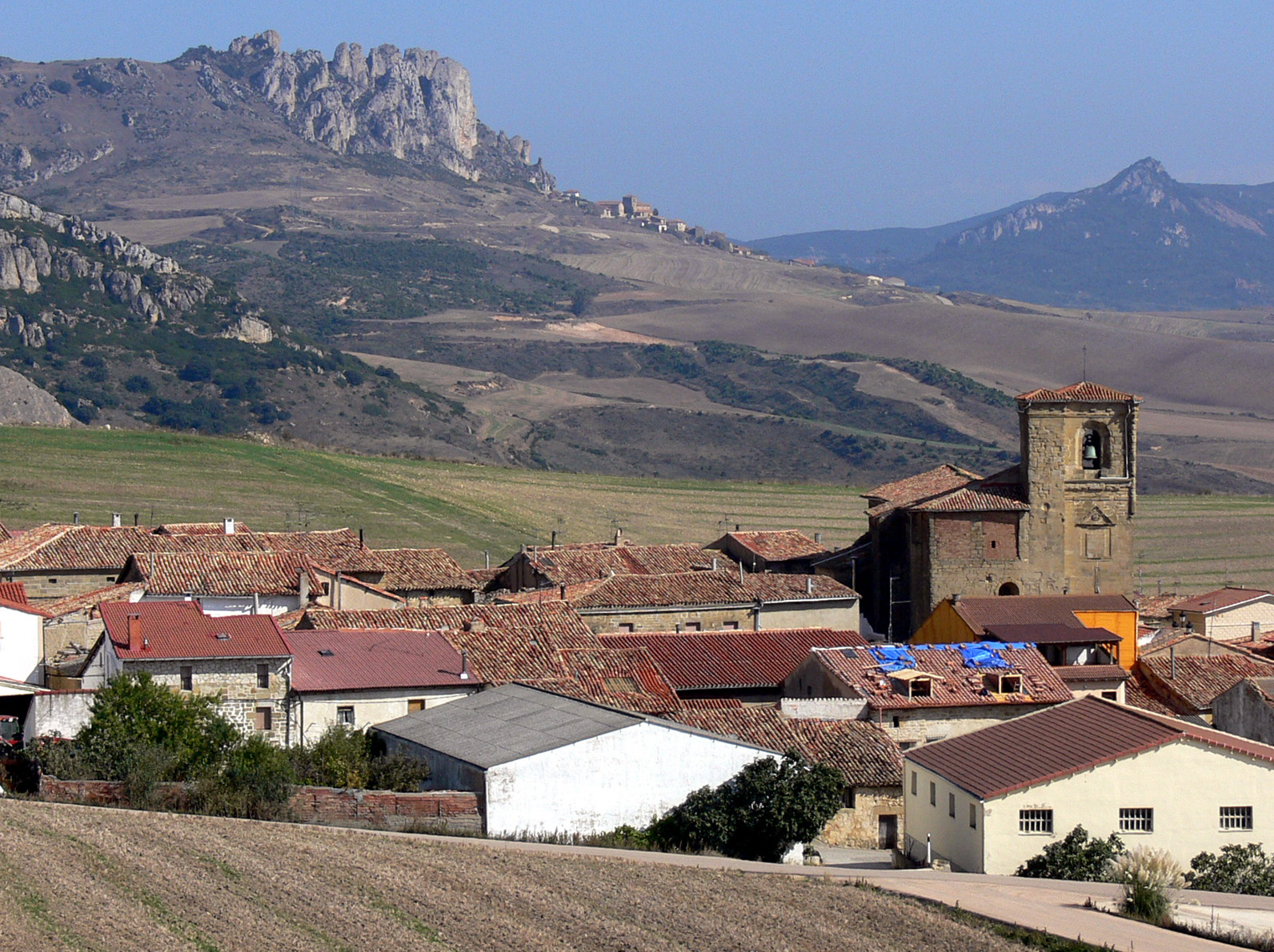
- Skyline of Foncea

- Location within La Rioja, Spain Location within Spain
- Coordinates: 42°36′55″N 3°02′16″W
- Country: Spain
- Autonomous community: La Rioja
- Comarca: Haro

Government
  - Mayor: Pedro Luis Orive (PP)

Area
  - Total: 22.72 km^{2} (8.77 sq mi)
- Elevation: 694 m (2,277 ft)

Population (2025-01-01)
  - Total: 86
- Postal code: 26211

Foncea is a municipality of the autonomous community of La Rioja (Spain). It is located in northeast of the province, near to the Montes Obarenes. It is part of the judicial district of Haro.

The first documental mention of Foncea was in 952 in some donation deeds.

Foncea is also a uncommon Spanish surname which origin is probably related with the municipality of Foncea, although this relation have not been proved. Persons with this surname live principally in Spain, Chile and Argentina.

== Notable people ==
- Ángel Casimiro de Govantes, historian.
