= Estar Lejos =

Single by Fonseca and Willie Colón

from the album Gratitud (Especial Edition)
- Released: December 18, 2009
- Genre: Bolero; latin pop
- Length: 4:07
- Label: EMI Latin
- Songwriter: Fonseca

Fonseca singles chronology
| "Arroyito" (2008) | "Estar Lejos" (2009) | "Desde Que No Estás" (2011) |

"Estar Lejos" (English: Be Far) is a Latin pop song by Colombian recording artist Fonseca and the American musician Willie Colón. It was released as promotional single of his third album Gratitud (2008) on December 18, 2009 in United States, more later in Colombia was released as fourth single on December 31, 2010. The song was nominated in the category Best Tropical Song on the Latin Grammy Awards of 2010, but lost being "Bachata en Fukuoka" the winner in this category.

== Song information ==
The song was written by Fonseca. During an interview he said about the song: "Is made with my style, but is a bolero after all. Is the first time that write a bolero and there we will release".

In November 2009 Fonseca offered a live concert transmitted by the Latin music channel HTV, where he had the opportunity to perform twelve songs. One of those songs was "Estar Lejos", the first time that he performed the song. In an interview he explained the lyric content and the inspiration that was born of his artistic situation: "In this profession one travels constantly and although I enjoy every step I take, sometimes being away hurts me too".

== Track listing ==
Digital download
| No. | Title | Writer(s) | Length |
|---|---|---|---|
| 1. | "Estar Lejos" | Juan Fernando Fonseca | 4:01 |

== Release history ==
| Region | Date | Format | Label |
|---|---|---|---|
| Colombia | December 30, 2010 | Digital download | EMI Latin |
| United States | December 18, 2009 | Digital download | EMI Latin |
