= National Symphony Orchestra of Colombia =

Colombian orchestra based in Bogotá

Colombian National Symphony Orchestra
- Orchestra
- Founded: 2003
- Location: Bogotá, Colombia
- Principal conductor: Yeruham Scharovsky
- Website: https://sinfonica.com.co/index

The National Symphony Orchestra of Colombia (Spanish: Orquesta Sinfónica Nacional de Colombia) is a Colombian orchestra based in Bogotá

== History ==
The orchestra was founded in 2003 following the dissolution of the Colombia Symphony Orchestra (Orquesta Sinfónica de Colombia) in December 2002. The Colombia Symphony Orchestra had been in operation since 1952 under the auspices of the government of Colombia and was dissolved as part of an extensive plan of state privatization. The Colombian National Symphony Orchestra is part of the 'National Association of Symphonic Music' (Asociación Nacional de Música Sinfónica), a non-profit organization that receives extensive support from the Colombian government to maintain the orchestra and to provide financial support to the other professional symphony orchestras in the country.

From 2003 to 2007, the orchestra's artistic direction was under the management of three music directors: Luis Biava (conductor-in-residence of the Philadelphia Orchestra until 2004), Alejandro Posada (then-music director of the Symphonic Orchestra of Castile and León (Orquesta Sinfónica de Castilla y León)), and Eduardo Carrizosa (then the assistant conductor of the Bogota Philharmonic (Orquesta Filarmónica de Bogotá)). In 2007, the orchestra opened a search process for a single principal conductor and artistic director. This search led to the appointment of Baldur Brönnimann as principal conductor and artistic director, who held the post from 2008 to 2012. In 2016, Olivier Grangean became principal conductor and artistic director of the orchestra.

== Conductors in leadership positions ==
- Luis Biava (2003–2007, joint music director)
- Alejandro Posada (2003–2007, joint music director)
- Eduardo Carrizosa (2003–2007, joint music director)
- Baldur Brönnimann (2008–2012, principal conductor and artistic director)
- Olivier Grangean (2016–2022, principal conductor and artistic director)
- Yeruham Scharovsky (2023–present, principal conductor and artistic director)

== Discography ==
=== Live albums ===
List of live albums, with selected chart positions
Title	Album details	Peak chart positions	Certifications
Title	Album details	US Classical	Certifications
Sinfónico (with Fonseca)	Released: July 9, 2014; Label: EMI; Format: CD/DVD, digital download	17	ASINCOL: 3× Platinum

== Awards and nominations ==
=== Latin Grammy Awards ===
A Latin Grammy Award is an accolade by the Latin Academy of Recording Arts & Sciences to recognize outstanding achievement in the music industry.

Year	Nominee / work	Award	Result
2014	Sinfónico	Album of the Year	Nominated
2014	Sinfónico	Best Traditional Pop Vocal Album	Won
