= Corazón (Fonseca album) =

Studio album by Fonseca
- Released: May 1, 2005
- Genre: Latin pop
- Label: EMI

Fonseca albums chronology
Fonseca (2000)	Corazón (2005)	Gratitud (2008)

Singles from Corazón
- 1. "Te Mando Flores" Released: 2005; 2. "Como Me Mira" Released: 2005; 3. "Hace Tiempo" Released: 2006

Corazón (heart) is the second studio album by Colombian singer Fonseca. One of the singles, "Te mando flores", won a 2006 Latin Grammy Award, it was the international breakthrough of Fonseca and became one of his signature songs.

== Track listing ==
1. "Hace tiempo" – 3:37
2. "Como me mira" – 3:47
3. "Corazón" – 4:18
4. "Sigo aquí cantando" – 4:01
5. "Te mando flores" – 4:28
6. "Lagartija azul" – 3:59
7. "Casa" – 3:09
8. "Mercedes" – 2:55
9. "Viene subiendo" – 4:04
10. "Idilio" – 3:47
11. "Vengo a hablar" – 4:40

== Charts ==
Chart (2006–2007)	Peak position
US Tropical Albums (Billboard)	7

== Certifications ==
Region	Certification
Colombia	2× Platinum
Venezuela	Platinum
