= Maía =

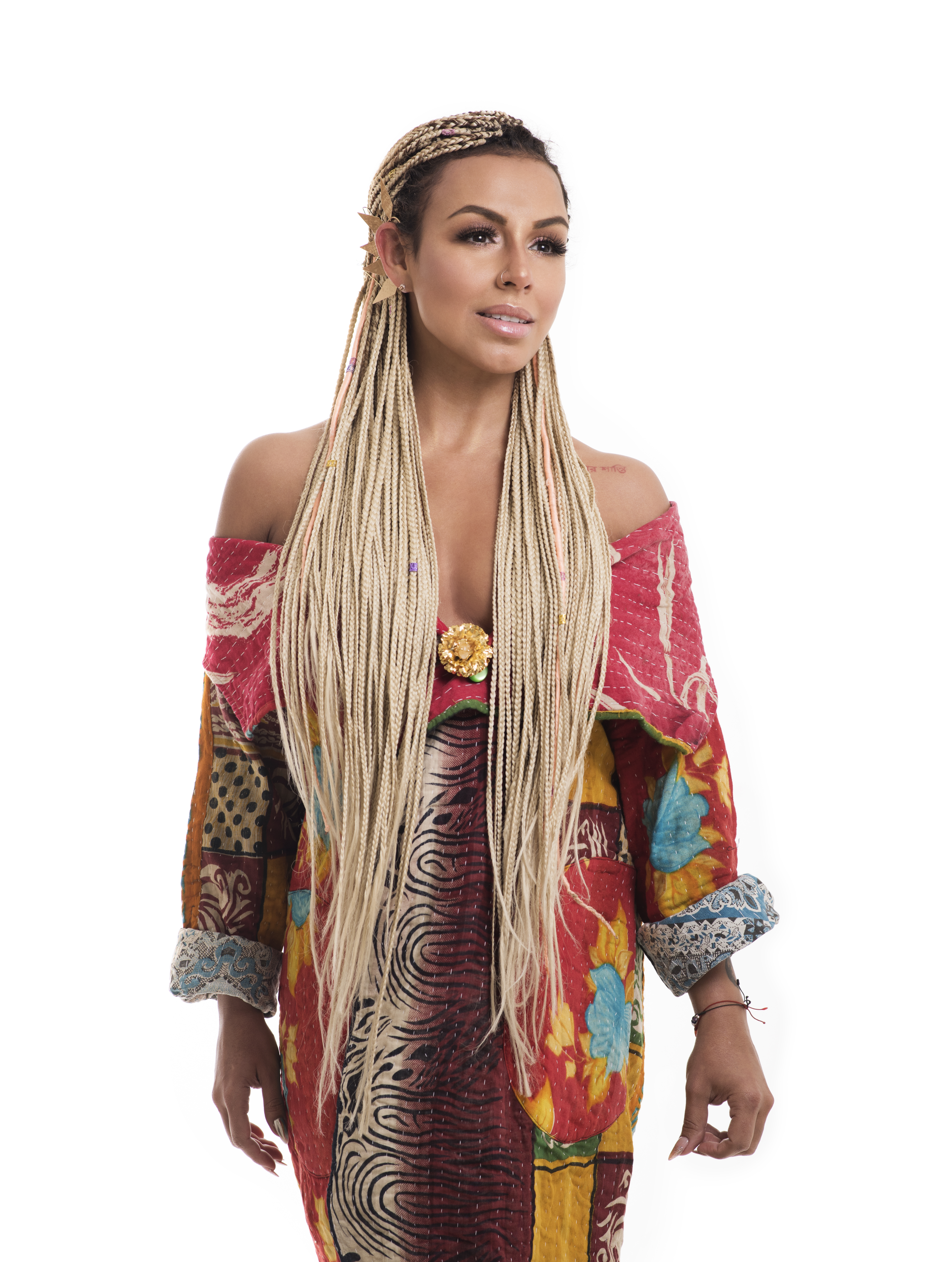
- Maía in 2015

Background information
- Also known as: Maía
- Born: Mónica Andrea Vives Orozco; 16 November 1981 (age 44); Barranquilla, Colombia
- Genres: Latin pop; Tropipop
- Occupation: Singer-songwriter
- Instrument: Vocals
- Years active: 2002–present
- Label: Maía Records
- Website: www.maiamusical.com

Mónica Andrea Vives Orozco, more commonly known as Maía (born 16 November 1981 in Barranquilla, Colombia) is a Colombian singer-songwriter.

== History ==
Mónica Vives Orozco (Maía) is the only child of Rafael Vives and Mónica Orozco. She grew up in Prado 15 Mar km from Barranquilla, the capital of the Atlántico Department on Colombia's Caribbean coast.

In 1998 at the age of 16, Maía won the Colombia Suena Bien (English: Colombia Sounds Good) contest organised by Sony Music.

In 2003 at the age of 22, Maía released her first studio album El Baile de los Sueños which was distributed throughout Latin America, Spain and the United States of America. The tracks "Niña Bonita" and "Se Me Acabó El Amor" were released as singles. "Niña Bonita" was used as the main theme for the Colombian telenovela La Costeña y El Cachaco

In 2005 Maía released her second album Natural from which the track "Ingenuidad" was released as a single. Also in 2005 Maía won Best Female Solo Singer in the Premios Shock awards.

In January 2007, Colombian newspaper El Tiempo reported that Maía was dedicating herself to her third album which was promised to be a change of musical direction including collaborations with foreign artists. In September 2010, Maia released a new hit single "Que Será de Mi" in anticipation of the release of the third album.

In 2010, Maía joined forces with Avon as a celebrity judge for Avon Voices, Avon's first ever global, online singing talent search for women and songwriting competition for men and women.

On 26 April 2012, Colombian website vive.in reported that Maía had released her third album Instinto. The first single released from the album is "No Quererte"

Maía continues to perform her material in Colombia and other countries. In addition to Spanish, her native tongue, Maía is also fluent in English and German.

== Discography ==
- 2003: El Baile de los Sueños
- 2005: Natural
- 2012: Instinto
