= Ay Amor (Fonseca song) =

Single by Fonseca

from the album Ilusión
- Released: August 31, 2012
- Genre: Latin pop
- Length: 3:32
- Label: Sony Music Latin
- Songwriter: Juan Fernando Fonseca

Fonseca singles chronology
"Eres Mi Sueño" (2011)	"Ay Amor" (2012)	"Si Te Acuerdas de Mi" (2013)

"Ay Amor" (English: Oh My Love) is a Latin pop song by Colombian recording artist Fonseca. It was released as the third radio single from his fourth studio album, Ilusión (2011), on August 31, 2012. On October 9, 2012, the song was digitally released with a dance version produced by Fainal.

== Music video ==
The music video was first released on Fonseca's official YouTube channel on September 6, 2012. It was directed by Pablo García, who had previously worked on the video for his last single "Eres Mi Sueño," and was co-directed by Fonseca himself. The music video was shot in Miami and features Colombian actress and model Carolina Gómez, wearing a black long outfit and a blue wig. As of July 20, 2013, the video has reached 1.82 million views on YouTube.

== Track listing ==
Digital download
No.	Title	Writer(s)	Producer(s)	Length
1.	"Ay Amor"	Juan Fernardo Fonseca	Andres Levin	3:21
2.	"Ay Amor" (Dance version)	Fonseca	Andres Levin, Fainal	3:00

== Credits and personnel ==
Recording

- Recorded at Fun MAchine - Pirate Studios and mixed at PolaPola Studios Brooklyn, New York, USA.

Personnel

- Songwriting – Juan Fernando Fonseca
- Production – Andres Levin
- Vocal engineering and recording – Ray Aldaco
- Music recording – Andres Levin and Juan Fernando Fonseca
- Assistant vocal recording – Juan Fernando Fonseca
- Mixing – Andy Baldwin

Credits adapted from the liner notes of Ilusión, Sony Music Latin, 10 Music.

== Charts ==
Chart (2012/2013)	Peak position
Colombia (National-Report)	17
