= Claudio Valenzuela =

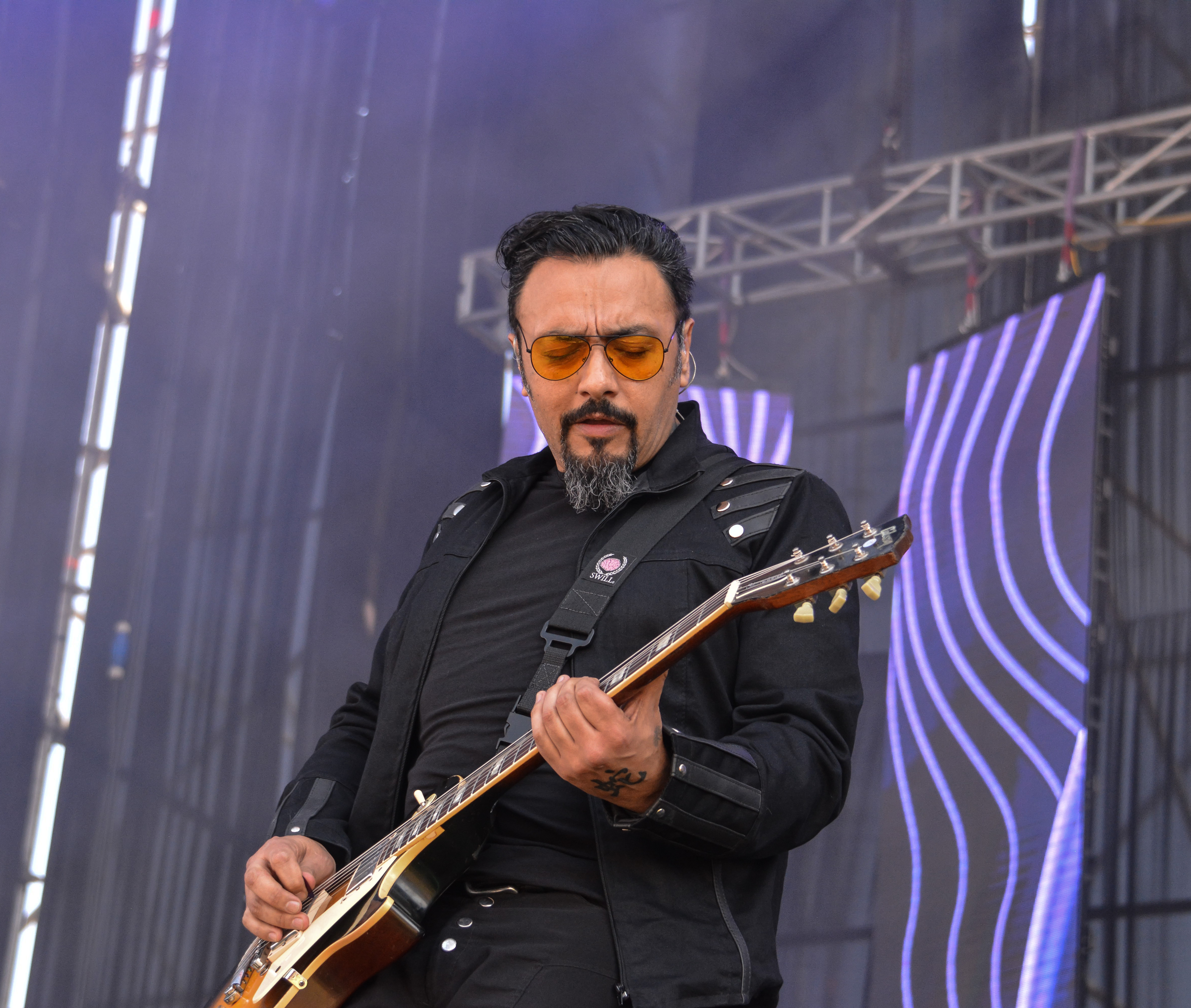

Background information
- Born: Claudio Andrés Valenzuela Ramírez; June 10, 1969 (age 57); Santiago, Chile
- Genres: Alternative rock,
- Occupations: Musician, songwriter, producer
- Instruments: Vocals, guitar
- Years active: 1991–present
- Label: Accidental Muzik
- Member of: Lucybell

Claudio Valenzuela (born June 10, 1969, in Santiago, Chile) is a guitarist, singer, and composer. He is most known as the lead-singer and guitarist of Chilean rock band Lucybell. Formed in 1991, Valenzuela is the only original member and the main composer of the band, as the line-up shifted over the years. Lucybell has released 7 studio albums.

In 2009 Claudio Valenzuela released his first solo album, Gemini. Released on the Accidental Muzik label, and produced by Adam Moseley, the album explores the themes of life, love, and death, and is bilingual (Spanish and English). Gemini was released in Mexico and the U.S. in 2010 and supported with tours in both countries.
