= Enrédame =

Single by Fonseca

from the album Gratitud
- Released: April 22, 2008
- Genre: Latin pop Tropipop
- Length: 3:51
- Label: EMI Latin
- Songwriter: Juan Fernando Fonseca

Fonseca singles chronology
"Hace Tiempo'" (2006)	"Enrédame" (2008)	"Arroyito'" (2008)

"Enrédame" (English: Tangle Me) is the first single by Colombian recording artist Fonseca. It was written and produced by the singer himself, for his third album "Gratitud". The song was released digitally on April 22, 2008.

== Track listing ==
iTunes digital download
No.	Title	Writer(s)		Length
1.	"Enrédame"	Juan Fernando Fonseca	Fanny Lú	3:51

== Charts ==
Chart (2008)	Peak position
US Hot Latin Songs (Billboard)	26
US Latin Pop Airplay (Billboard)	11
US Tropical Airplay (Billboard)	23
