= Bernardo Ossa =

Colombian musician

Bernardo Ossa is a Colombian composer, musician, sound engineer, Record Label manager and 4 time Grammy Award producer. He was born in Cali, Colombia.

Bernardo Ossa initiated the composer Kike Santander into the world of composition in the eighties, introducing him into the big league advertising agencies, and became partners in a successful music career. He collaborated in the production of Premonición (Premonition) the third album of Spanish David Bisbal, which was released in 2006. That album sold more than 1 million copies around the world., as in 2 of his previous productions. In March 2007, Bernardo Ossa was voted Best Producer of the Year. In 2009, he worked with Kike Santander. Ossa has participated in productions of Thalía, Alejandro Fernández, Paulina Rubio, David Bisbal, Diego Torres, Amaury Gutierrez, Olga Tañon (3 Grammy Awards), Christian Castro, Noelia, Ricardo Montaner, among others. He also produced 3 the latest albums for Fonseca, with which he won a Billboard and 2 Latin Grammys. He has also produced Carlos Vives's hit Clasicos de la Provincia 1, selling 4 million copies worldwide, Verónica Orozco, Julio César Meza, who won The X Factor in Colombia in 2005.

== Family ==
He married Carmen Luz Jimenez, and had a child with actress Isabella Santo Domingo, her name is Daniela Ossa.
