= Tropipop =

Music genre

- Stylistic origins: Music of the Caribbean Region of Colombia, vallenato, salsa, merengue, pop, pop rock, funk, Latin pop
- Cultural origins: Late 1980s, Colombia
- Typical instruments: Vocals, electric guitar, acoustic guitar, bass guitar, accordion, drums, Latin percussion

Tropipop (also known as Colombian pop and Trop-pop) is a music genre that developed in Colombia in the late 1990s and early 2000s. It is a blend of traditional musical forms of the Caribbean Region of Colombia, mainly vallenato, with foreign Latin genres such as salsa and merengue, and pop and pop rock. The term "tropipop" comes from the portmanteau of the words "tropical" and "pop music" describing the genre's mix of Latin tropical roots with American popular music.

Some popular tropipop acts are Fanny Lu, Fonseca, Bonka, Mauricio & Palodeagua, Lucas Arnau and the internationally successful Carlos Vives.

== History ==
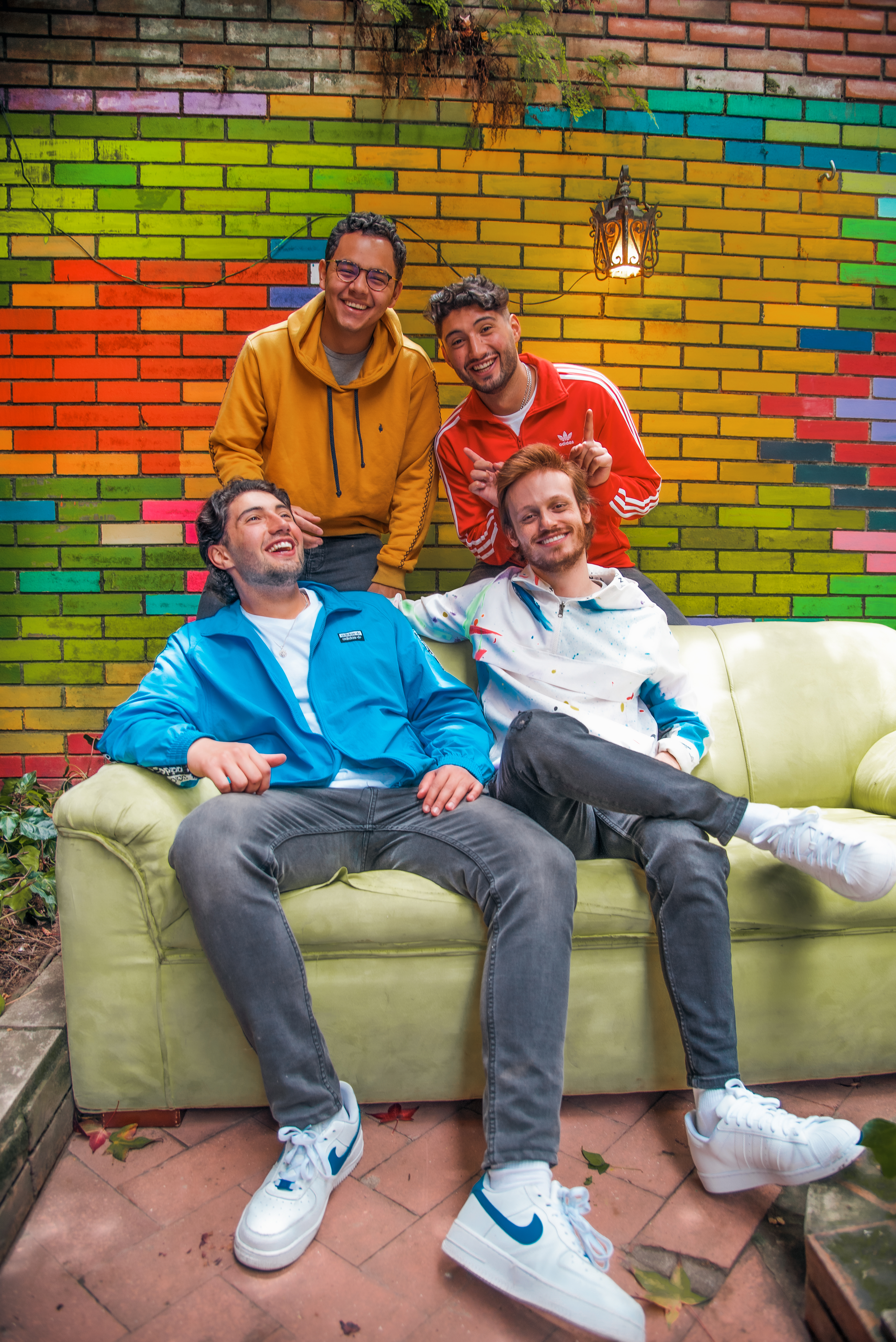
"Neo-Tropipop" group Marenka

=== Early development ===
Since the early emergence of Colombian rock in the 1960s and 1970s, bands like Genesis (Colombian rock band) began to experiment fusing traditional Colombian music with pop rock. In the following decades, rock bands like Aterciopelados continued bringing elements of Colombian folklore into rock music.

=== Carlos Vives and La Provincia ===
The stylistic origins of tropipop can be traced back to 1993 when Carlos Vives released the album Clásicos de la Provincia. This very popular album was notable for the use of rock instruments like electric guitars to sing traditional vallenato songs. Vives' and his band, La provincia, continued experimenting the fusion of vallenato and cumbia with pop, rock and funk in their subsequent albums La Tierra del Olvido and Tengo Fe.

For his following album, El Amor de Mi Tierra, Vives hooked up with the successful Cuban American producer Emilio Estefan. Estefan stylized Vives music into a more pop-oriented sound, with less instrumental breaks, more prominent vocal parts, and less dominant vallenato and cumbia elements. Vives continued this sound in his next two albums, gaining a lot of success. It was this stylized fusion style, heard in Vives songs such as "Tu Amor Eterno", which was later adopted by tropipop artists. Vives' influence and success was so big that it has been said that all the artists that came after him playing fusions of pop rock and vallenato are either "imitators or part of the school that he formed".

=== Tropipop ===
In the early 2000s, young musicians from Bogotá and other big Colombian cities, inspired by Carlos Vives' success began recording fusions of vallenato and pop rock. What a decade before would have been considered experimental, was now mainstream. The group of artists which played this style of fusion began being commercialized under the term tropipop. During the 2000s, tropipop became the most popular music genre in Colombia alongside reggaeton. Furthermore, some artists gained some success internationally. Mauricio & Palodeagua were nominated for a Latin Grammy in 2004 and Bogotan singer Fonseca won one in 2006.

== Criticism ==
Due to the simplistic nature of the music, and the lack of prominence of Colombian traditional music elements in favour of pop music structures, Tropipop has been criticised by sectors of the public and the media for its lack of originality. For example, it has been said that Tropipop is "a cocktail that has a little bit of rock, two drops of accordion, a pinch of cumbia and a singer with a fashioned look".

Critics generally agree in saying that Tropipop musicians have not really investigated Colombian folklore to include Colombian traditional music in a genuine way. They say that the Colombian elements in tropipop are superficial. Critics usually also give preference to fusions different from Tropipop as the ones made in Carlos Vives' early albums, or the ones played by Sidestepper and Bomba Estereo.

However, some critics defend the tropipop artists will to include Caribbean elements in their music.

== Artists ==
These are some of the artists whose main genre is tropipop:

- Fonseca
- Wamba
- Fanny Lu
- Juanes
- Bacilos
- Jerau
- Sanalejo
- Lucas Arnau
- Carlos Vives
- Bonka
- Maía
- Mauricio & Palo de Agua
- Pasabordo
- Gusi
- Sin Ánimo de Lucro
- Qarto Aparte
- Little Jesus
- Katamarán
- Lali
