= Arroyito (song) =

Single by Fonseca

from the album Gratitud
- Released: May 27, 2008
- Genre: Latin pop
- Length: 3:35
- Label: EMI Latin
- Songwriter: Wilfran Castillo

Fonseca singles chronology
"Enrédame" (2008)	"Arroyito" (2008)	"Estar Lejos" (2010)

"Arroyito" (English: "little stream") is a Latin pop song by Colombian recording artist Fonseca. It was written and produced by Wilfran Castillo, for his third studio album. The song was released digitally on May 5, 2008, for the album Gratitud. In 2012 the Austrian singer Hansi Hinterseer covered the song titled "So Sehr Liebe Ich Dich" (So Much I love You).

== Track listing ==
Digital download
No.	Title	Writer(s)	Length
1.	"Arroyito" (Acoustic version)	Wilfran Castillo	3:35

== Charts ==
Chart (2008/2009)	Peak position
US Hot Latin Songs (Billboard)	22
US Latin Pop Airplay (Billboard)	10
US Tropical Airplay (Billboard)	12
Venezuela (Record Report)	3
