= Fonseca (singer) =

Colombian singer

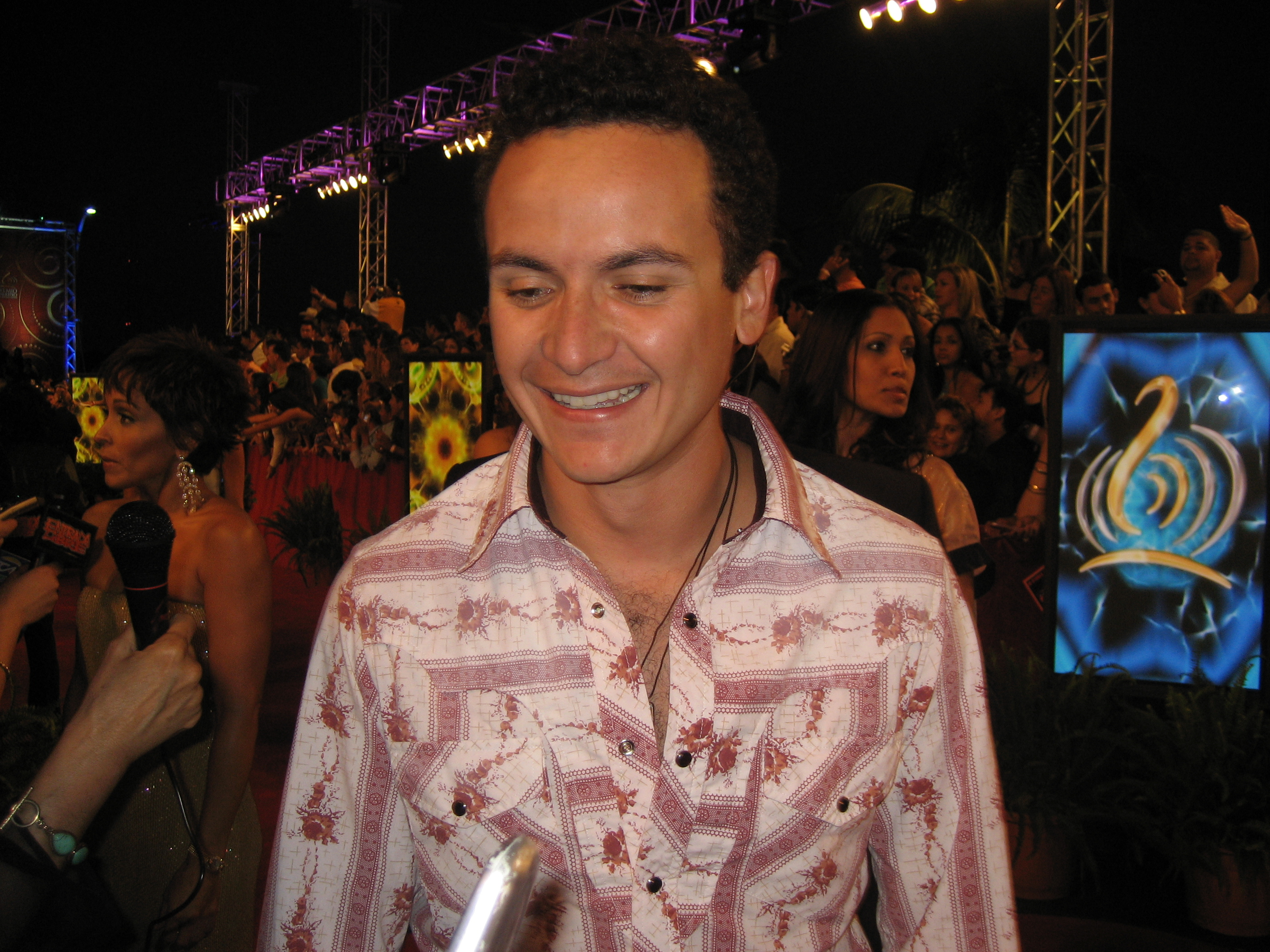
- Fonseca at the 2007 Lo Nuestro Awards

Background information
- Born: Juan Fernando Fonseca Carrera; 29 May 1979 (age 47); Bogotá, Colombia
- Genres: Tropipop; Latin pop; Vallenato; Reggaeton
- Occupations: Singer
- Years active: 1997–present
- Labels: EMI Capitol (2002–2010); Sony Music (2012–)
- Website: fonseca.net okmediamarketing.com/eventos/fonseca-viajante-usa-tour-2023/

Juan Fernando Fonseca Carrera (born 29 May 1979) is a Colombian singer. Born in Bogotá, he chose music at an early age, studying music formally at institutions such as Javeriana University in Bogotá and Berklee College of Music in Boston. Fonseca's self-titled debut gained him considerable attention in Colombia. His second album released Corazón (2005) explored the crossroads where pop/rock influences meet vallenato, bullerengue, and tambora. Gratitud followed in 2008, with Ilusión arriving in 2011.

Fonseca recorded Sinfónico in concert with Orquesta Sinfónica Nacional de Colombia in 2013. Released a year later. In early 2015, Fonseca was awarded La Musa Premio Triunfador by the Latin Songwriters Hall of Fame, and in May received the first-ever Contemporary Icon Award at the SESAC Latina Music Awards. In the fall, he released the album Conexión. This album included collaborations with recognized artists like Juanes and Victor Manuelle. Fonseca released his latest album Agustín in November 2018 which had four nominations for the 20th Annual Latin Grammys Awards

In 2018, Fonseca received "La Orden de Boyacá en grado Oficial", the most important recognition given by the Colombian government as part of his work as a promoter of reconciliation and peace. Through his musical career, Fonseca has been awarded with seven Latin Grammys and also has been nominated in 2 opportunities to the Grammy Awards.

== Life and career ==
=== 1979–1996: Early life ===
Juan Fernando Fonseca Carrera was born on 29 May 1979, in Bogotá. In his youth he studied in Colegio Los Nogales and then he passed to Gimnasio Campestre. Fonseca's interest in music began at a young age. In fact, when he was just twelve years old, he recorded a song and had 500 copies made to distribute among his friends and family. His parents recognized his talent and encouraged him to pursue his passion. Fonseca studied music at the Pontificia Universidad Javeriana (Bogotá) and at the Berklee College of Music (Boston), where he developed not only his musical talent but also the tools needed to navigate through the competitive world of performance.

Prior to the release of his first album, Fonseca was a member of the rock band Baroja, which was well known on the Bogotá club scene.

=== 1997–2007: Debut album and Corazón ===
After graduation from college, he recorded his first album titled Bomba de Tiempo that he sold door-to-door, showing the album to patrons at small bars, and eventually selling 500 copies.

Fonseca was searching for a record label when he found the Colombian musician José Gaviria and helped him in an initial recording with Sonolux in United States in 1997. The project stayed up in the air until 2002 when he signed with Líderes Entertainment Group, a label of EMI Capitol to produce his three upcoming albums.

Fonseca's self-titled debut album was released in February 2002 in Colombia and on 26 December 2005, internationally. The album had a moderate success in his native country. The album spawned four singles, "Mangangué", "Noche de Carnaval", "Sueño" and "Confiésame". The album is highly influenced by the Colombian "tropipop" sound associated with Carlos Vives' albums Clásicos de la Provincia and La Tierra del Olvido. The album gained him considerable attention in Colombia, including the notice of artists like Shakira and Juanes, both of whom offered him subsequent collaboration and performance opportunities. Sharing the stage with Shakira on her Tour of the Mongoose and Juanes at Estadio El Campín in Bogotá garnered Fonseca the recognition and momentum he would need for his second album.

His second studio album, Corazón produced by Fonseca himself, Bernardo Ossa and the executive producer Alvaro Rizo, was released on 23 May 2006. Allmusic gave the album a rating of three out of five stars. The album has reached a peak position of number seven on the U.S. Tropical Albums chart. Three of the album's eleven tracks became singles, including "Te Mando Flores", "Como Me Mira" and "Hace Tiempo". The first song won Fonseca one Latin Grammy and reaching the top 10 on the U.S. Latin chart.

=== 2008–2018: Gratitud, Ilusión, Conexión, and Agustín ===
Fonseca released his third studio album Gratitud, on 27 May 2008. The album had a peak position of seventy on the U.S. Latin Albums chart. It had four singles, "Enrédame", "Arroyito", "Paraíso" and "Estar Lejos" with the American musician Willie Colón.

In Miami, Florida in the United States on 24 September 2013, Fonseca received "SESAC Latina Radio and TV Performance Award". It is an important recognition to the deployment in radio and television of the single "Eres Mi Sueño".

In 2018, Fonseca released his album Agustín that was named in tribute to the birth of his youngest son, and it contains singles including Ven, Sólo Contigo, and Simple Corazones. The album and the single Ven were nominated for four Latin Grammy Awards in which the album only won the Best Traditional Pop Vocal Album.

=== 2021−present: Compadres US, Europe Tour, and Viajante ===
In 2021, Fonseca released two singles including "Tú 1ero" and "2005". The latter is an urban version of "Te Mando Flores", which celebrated its 15th anniversary. Fonseca was also co-featured in three singles including "Este Corazón" by Diego Torres ,"Perdoname" by Superlithio and "Si Yo Estoy Loco" by Sanluis. The success of "2005" resulted in being ranked #1 in Ecuador as of 29 November-Dec. 5th.

In 2021 Fonseca also had two tours. The first tour was the Compadres US tour which had three sold out shows in Orlando, Atlanta and Miami. In addition in November, he had three sold out shows in Bogotá and Medellín, Colombia.

The Fonseca Tour Europa 2021 also had four sold out shows in Geneva, Paris, Barcelona and Madrid.

In April 2022, Fonseca released his another album, Viajante, that feature singers Silvestre Dangond, Matisse, Greeicy, Cali & El Dandee, and Cimafunk. The album contain songs including "Cartagena", "Para Poder Decirte Adiós", "Besos en la Frente", and "2005".

== Personal life ==
Fonseca is also very concerned with changing the rest of the world's view of his mother country, Colombia, using his music as a platform to publicize the positive aspects of the nation. During his U.S. tour in early 2013, Fonseca made a point to show videos of and to speak personally about Colombia. On the same tour Fonseca worked with Marca Colombia, ("Brand Colombia" in English) a program run by the Colombian government to re-educate other countries about Colombian culture, as well as with the Colombian airline Avianca, a sponsor of the tour. Of his work with these two entities, Fonseca has said to Colombia Reports, "I am excited that on my Illusion World Tour I will carry the message of Colombia from the Brand Colombia [markets a positive image of the country] to the United States. I am very proud of my country and I'm honored to be its ambassador". Fonseca states that he views music as a representation of culture, so using his music to promote and educate people on Colombia makes sense to him.

Fonseca is married to his childhood sweetheart Juliana Posada and they have three children together.

== Discography ==
- Fonseca (2002)
- Corazón (2005)
- Gratitud (2008)
- Ilusión (2011)
- Conexión (2015)
- Agustín (2018)
- Viajante (2022)
- Tropicalia (2024)
- Antes Que El Tiempo Se Vaya (2026)

== Filmography ==
=== Film roles ===
Year	Title	Roles	Notes
2020	Dolittle	Kevin	Latin American Spanish (Dub)

== Awards and nominations ==
=== Grammy Awards ===
The Grammy Award is an accolade by the National Academy of Recording Arts and Sciences of the United States to recognize outstanding achievement on the music industry. Fonseca received four total Grammy Award nominations in his career, one in 2013 and one in 2017 while the final decision for the other two will be announced in 2023.

Year	Nominee / work	Award	Result
2013	Ilusión	Best Latin Pop Album	Nominated
2017	Conexión	Best Tropical Latin Album	Nominated
2023	Viajante	Best Latin Pop Album	Nominated

=== Latin Grammy Awards ===
A Latin Grammy Award is an accolade by the Latin Academy of Recording Arts & Sciences to recognize outstanding achievement in the music industry. Fonseca has received four awards from ten nominations.

Year	Nominee / work	Award	Result
2006	"Te Mando Flores"	Record of the Year	Nominated
2006	Corazón	Best Contemporary Tropical Album	Nominated
2006	"Te Mando Flores"	Best Tropical Song	Won
2008	Gratitud	Best Contemporary Tropical Album	Nominated
2009	Pombo Musical (Varios Artistas)	Best Latin Children's Album	Won
2010	"Estar Lejos"	Best Tropical Song	Nominated
2012	Ilusión	Best Tropical Fusion Album	Won
2012	"Desde Que No Estás"	Best Tropical Song	Nominated
2014	Sinfónico	Album of the Year	Nominated
2014	Sinfónico	Best Traditional Pop Vocal Album	Won
2016	Conexión	Album of the Year	Nominated
2016	Vine A Buscarte	Best Tropical Song	Won
2019	Agustín	Album of the Year	Nominated
2019	Ven	Song of the Year	Nominated
2019	Agustín	Best Traditional Pop Vocal Album	Won
2019	Ven	Best Pop Song	Nominated
2022	Viajante	Album of the Year	Nominated
2022	Besos en la Frente	Song of the Year	Nominated
2022	Viajante	Best Traditional Pop Vocal Album	Nominated
2022	Besos en la Frente	Best Pop Song	Nominated

=== Los Premios MTV Latinoamérica ===
Los Premios MTV Latinoamérica or VMALA's is the Latin American version of the Video Music Awards.

Year	Nominee / work	Award	Result
2006	Fonseca	Best New Artist – Central	Won
2006	Fonseca	Promising Artist	Nominated

=== Premios Nuestra Tierra ===
A Premio Nuestra Tierra is an accolade that recognize outstanding achievement in the Colombian music industry. Fonseca has received three nominations.

Year	Nominee / work	Award	Result
2014	"Prometo"	Best Tropical Performance of the Year	Nominated
2014	Himself	Best Tropical Solo Artist or Group	Nominated
2014	Himself	Tweeter of the Year	Nominated

== See also ==
- Music of Colombia

Awards and achievements
Los Premios MTV Latinoamérica
Preceded by Andrea Echeverri	Los Premios MTV Latinoamérica for Best New Artist — Central; 2006	Succeeded by Six Pac
Latin Grammy Awards
Preceded by Juan Luis Guerra for Las Avispas	Latin Grammy Award for Best Tropical Song; 2006 for Te Mando Flores	Succeeded by Juan Luis Guerra for La Llave de Mi Corazón
Preceded by Miguelito for El Heredero	Latin Grammy Award for Best Latin Children's Album; 2009 for Pombo Musical	Succeeded by Luis Pescetti for Luis Pescetti
First	Latin Grammy Award for Best Tropical Fusion Album; 2012 for Ilusión+	Succeeded by Carlos Vives for Corazón Profundo
Preceded by Laura Pausini for Hazte Sentir	Latin Grammy Award for Best Traditional Pop Vocal Album; 2019 for Agustín	Most recent
