= ChocQuibTown discography =

- Studio albums: 4
- EPs: 2
- Singles: 13
- Promotional singles: 3

Colombian group ChocQuibTown has released four studio albums, two extended plays, one remix album and thirteen singles (including three as featured artist), and three promotional singles.

== Albums ==
=== Studio albums ===
List of studio albums, with selected details and chart positions
Title	Album details	Peak chart positions	Certifications
Title	Album details	US Latin Rhythm	Certifications
Somos Pacífico	Released: 2006; Label: Polen, Zafra; Format: CD	—	
Oro	Released: March 2, 2010; Label: Nacional Records; Format: CD, digital download	—	
Eso Es Lo Que Hay	Released: October 2, 2012; Label: Sony Music Latin; Format: CD, digital download	—	ASINCOL: Gold
El Mismo	Released: May 6, 2015 (COL); Label: Sony Music Latin; Format: CD, digital download	5	
Sin Miedo	Released: May 25, 2018 (COL); Label: Sony Music Latin; Format: CD, digital download	—	
ChocQuib House	Released: June 12, 2020 (US); Label: Sony Music Latin; Format: CD, digital download	—	RIAA: Gold (Latin)
"—" denotes a title that did not chart, or was not released in that territory.

=== Remix albums ===
List of remix albums, and selected details
Title	Album details
Behind the Machine	Released: November 25, 2013; Label: Sony Music Latin; Format: CD, digital download

=== Extended plays ===
List of EPs, and selected details
Title	Album details
El Bombo	Released: June 6, 2008; Label: Nacional Records; Format: CD
Paris-Bogotá (with Oxmo Puccino)	Released: 2008; Label: N/A; Format: CD

== Singles ==
=== As lead artist ===
List of singles, with selected chart positions, showing year released and album name
Title	Year	Peak chart positions						Certifications	Album
Title	Year	COL	MEX	SPA	US Latin Pop	US Rhythm	US Trop.	Certifications	Album
"Somos Pacífico"	2006	—	—	—	—	—	—		Somos Pacífico
"Pescao Envenenao"	2006	—	—	—	—	—	—		Somos Pacífico
"El Bombo (Toquemen el Bómbo)"	2008	—	—	—	—	—	—		El Bombo
"Oro"	2009	—	—	—	—	—	—		Oro
"Son Berejú"	2009	—	—	—	—	—	—		Oro
"De Donde Vengo Yo"	2010	—	—	—	—	—	—		Oro
"Calentura" (featuring Tego Calderón & Zully Murillo)	2011	—	—	—	—	21	—		Eso Es Lo Que Hay
"Hasta el Techo"	2011	7	—	—	—	—	—		Eso Es Lo Que Hay
"Uh La La"	2013	—	—	—	—	—	—		Eso Es Lo Que Hay
"Cuando Te Veo"	2015	1	— (Note: "Cuando Te Veo" did not enter the Billboard Mexican Airplay, but peaked at number 30 on the Mexico Español chart.)	—	29	16	13		El Mismo
"Ritmo Violento" (featuring Alexis Play)	2015	—	—	—	—	—	—		El Mismo
"Salsa & Choke" (featuring Ñejo)	2015	—	—	—	—	—	10		El Mismo
"Fiesta Animal" (featuring Notch)	2015	—	—	—	—	—	—		El Mismo
"Desde el Día en que Te Fuiste" (featuring Wisin)	2016	—	—	—	29	21	1		El Mismo
"Nuquí (Te Quiero Para Mí)"	2016	—	—	—	—	—	—		El Mismo
"Invencible"	2018	10	—	—	—	—	—		Sin Miedo
"Somos Los Prieto" (featuring Alexis Play)	2018	—	—	—	—	—	—		Sin Miedo
"Pa' Olvidarte" (solo or remix featuring Zion & Lennox, Farruko and Manuel Turizo)	2018	1	—	66	—	—	—	RIAA: 3× Platinum (Latin)	ChocQuib House
"Contigo"	2018	—	—	—	—	—	—		Sin Miedo
"Que Me Baile" (with Becky G)	2019	4	—	96	—	—	—		ChocQuib House
"Donde Están" (with Anna Carina)	2019	—	—	—	—	—	—		TBA
"Fresa"	2020	2	—	—	—	—	—		ChocQuib House
"—" denotes a title that was not released or did not chart in that territory

=== As featured artist ===
List of singles
Title	Year	Peak chart positions						Album
Title	Year	COL	MEX	US Latin	US Latin Pop	US Trop.	VEN	Album
"Creo en América" (Diego Torres featuring ChocQuibTown & Ivete Sangalo)	2011	—	—	—	—	—	—	—N/a
"El Mar de Sus Ojos" (Carlos Vives featuring ChocQuibTown)	2014	1	— (Note: "El Mar de Sus Ojos" did not enter the Billboard Mexican Airplay, but peaked at number 35 on the Mexico Español chart.)	11	15	2	1	Más + Corazón Profundo
"Un Paso Hacia La Paz" (with Artists for #SoyCapaz)	2014	—	—	—	—	—	—	—N/a
"—" denotes a title that was not released or did not chart in that territory

== Guest appearances ==
Title	Year	Other artist(s)	Album
"Intro"	2009	Toño Barrio	Toño Barrio Latin Groove
"Tips"	2010	Onechot	Ruff
"Macru"	2011	—N/a	Afritanga - The Sound of Afrocolombia
"Lo Que Traigo"	2012	"Mkc"	Caribbean Swagga
"Lindo Cielo"	2014	Jorge Celedón	Celedón Sin Fronteras, Vol. 2
"Iron Lion Zion"	2014	Santana, Ziggy Marley	Corazón
"De Zurda"	2014	Gustavo Santaolalla, Julieta Venegas, Gustavo Cordera	—N/a
"Iron Lion Zion - Live"	2014	Santana, Elias Atias	Corazón - Live From Mexico: Live It To Believe It
"No Es lo Mismo"	2015	Samo	Me Quito el Sombrero (En Vivo Desde Guanajuato)
