= 15th Annual Latin Grammy Awards =

Music awards presented Nov 2014

15th Latin Grammy Awards
- Date: November 20, 2014
- Venue: MGM Grand Garden Arena, Paradise, Nevada

Highlights
- Person of the Year: Joan Manuel Serrat

Television/radio coverage
- Network: Univision

The 15th Annual Latin Grammy Awards was held on November 20, 2014, at the MGM Grand Garden Arena in Las Vegas. This was the first time that Latin Grammys has been held at this location. The main telecast was broadcast on Univision at 8:00PM EST.

The nominations were announced on September 24, 2014. Puerto Rican musician Eduardo Cabra led the nominations with ten nominations each. Joan Manuel Serrat was honored as the Latin Recording Academy Person of the Year on November 19, the day prior to the Latin Grammy Awards.

== Awards ==
The following is a list of nominees and winners (in bold):

=== General ===
Record of the Year

Jorge Drexler featuring Ana Tijoux — "Universos Paralelos"

- Pablo Alborán featuring Jesse & Joy — "Dónde está el Amor"
- Marc Anthony — "Cambio de Piel"
- Calle 13 — "Respira el Momento"
- Camila — "Decidiste Dejarme"
- Luis Fonsi featuring Juan Luis Guerra — "Llegaste Tú"
- Enrique Iglesias featuring Descemer Bueno and Gente de Zona — "Bailando"
- Prince Royce — "Darte un Beso"
- Carlos Vives featuring Marc Anthony — "Cuando Nos Volvamos a Encontrar"
- Carlos Vives featuring ChocQuibTown — "El Mar de Sus Ojos"

Album of the Year

Paco de Lucía — Canción Andaluza

- Marc Anthony — 3.0
- Rubén Blades — Tangos
- Calle 13 — Multi Viral
- Camila — Elypse
- Lila Downs, Niña Pastori, Soledad — Raíz
- Jorge Drexler — Bailar en la Cueva
- Fonseca and the National Symphony Orchestra of Colombia — Sinfónico
- Jarabe de Palo — Somos
- Carlos Vives — Más Corazón Profundo

Song of the Year

Descemer Bueno, Gente de Zona and Enrique Iglesias — "Bailando"

- Caetano Veloso — "A Bossa Nova É Foda"
- Yoel Henríquez and Julio Reyes Copello — "Cambio de Piel" (Marc Anthony)
- Manu Moreno and Aleks Syntek — "Corazones Invencibles"
- Andrés Castro and Carlos Vives — "Cuando Nos Volvamos a Encontrar" (Carlos Vives featuring Marc Anthony)
- Andrés Castro, Guianko Gómez, Juan Riveros and Prince Royce — "Darte un Beso" (Prince Royce)
- Mario Domm, Lauren Evans and Mónica Vélez — "Decidiste Dejarme" (Camila)
- Jesse & Joy — "Mi Tesoro"
- Calle 13 and Silvio Rodríguez — "Ojos Color Sol"
- Jorge Drexler and Ana Tijoux — "Universos Paralelos"

Best New Artist

Mariana Vega

- Aneeka
- Linda Briceño
- Caloncho
- Julio César
- Pablo López
- Miranda
- Periko & Jessi León
- Daniela Spalla
- Juan Pablo Vega

=== Pop ===
Best Contemporary Pop Vocal Album

Camila — Elypse

- Debi Nova — Soy
- Rosario — Rosario
- Santana — Corazón (Deluxe Version)
- Mariana Vega — Mi Burbuja

Best Traditional Pop Vocal Album

Fonseca and the National Symphony Orchestra of Colombia — Sinfónico

- Andrea Bocelli — Amor En Portofino
- Linda Briceño — Tiempo
- Café Quijano — Orígenes: El Bolero Volumen 2
- Marco Antonio Solís — Gracias Por Estar Aqui

=== Urban ===
Best Urban Performance

Enrique Iglesias featuring Descemer Bueno and Gente de Zona — "Bailando"

- J Balvin featuring Farruko — "6 AM"
- Calle 13 — "Adentro"
- Don Omar — "Pura Vida"
- Wisin — "Que Viva la Vida"

Best Urban Music Album

Calle 13 — Multi Viral

- Alexis & Fido — La Esencia
- J Balvin — La Familia
- Yandel — De Líder a Leyenda
- Daddy Yankee — King Daddy

Best Urban Song

Descemer Bueno, Gente de Zona and Enrique Iglesias — "Bailando"

- Calle 13 — "Adentro"
- Calle 13 — "Cuando Los Pies Besan El Piso"
- J Balvin and Farruko — "6 AM"
- André Célis and Ana Tijoux — "Vengo"

=== Rock ===
Best Rock Album

Molotov — Agua Maldita

- Enrique Bunbury — Palosanto
- Doctor Krápula — Ama-Zonas
- Don Tetto — Don Tetto
- Luz Verde — El Final Del Mundo Vol. II: Nada Es Imposible

Best Pop/Rock Album

Juanes — Loco de Amor

- Airbag — Libertad
- Elefantes — El Rinoceronte
- Jarabe de Palo — Somos
- Vega — Wolverines

Best Rock Song

Andrés Calamaro — "Cuando No Estás"

- Rubén Albarrán, Doctor Krápula, Roco Pachukote and Moyenei Valdez — "Ama-Zonas"
- Enrique Bunbury — "Despierta"
- Emmanuel Del Real and Juanes — "Mil Pedazos" (Juanes)
- Clemente Castillo, Charly Castro and Flip Tamez — "Sin Respuesta" (Jumbo)
- Jarabe de Palo — "Somos" (Jarabe De Palo featuring Gabylonia and Montse "La Duende")

=== Alternative ===
Best Alternative Music Album

Babasónicos — Romantisísmico

- Caloncho — Fruta
- Los Cafres — Los Cafres - 25 Años De Música!
- Siddhartha — El Vuelo Del Pez
- Sig Ragga — Aquelarre

Best Alternative Song

Calle 13 — "El Aguante"

- Gustavo Cortés and Sig Ragga — "Chaplin" (Sig Ragga)
- Jesús Báez Caballero and Siddhartha — "El Aire" (Siddhartha)
- Adrián Rodríguez and Diego Rodríguez — "La Lanza" (Babasónicos)
- Yayo González — "Vamos A Morir" (Paté de Fuá featuring Catalina García)

=== Tropical ===
Best Salsa Album

Marc Anthony — 3.0

- Maite Hontelé — Déjame Así
- Tito Nieves — Mis Mejores Recuerdos
- Aymee Nuviola — First Class To Havana
- Mario Ortiz All Star Band — 50 Aniversario

Best Cumbia/Vallenato Album

Jorge Celedón and Various Artists — Celedón Sin Fronteras 1

- Dubán Bayona & Jimmy Zambrano — Métete en el Viaje
- Diomedes Díaz and Álvaro López — La Vida del Artista
- Alejandro Palacio — La Voz del Ídolo
- Juan Piña — Cantándole a Mi Valle

Best Contemporary Tropical Album

Carlos Vives — Más Corazón Profundo

- Julio César — Todo Empieza Soñando
- Jorge Luis Chacín — El Color De Mi Locura...
- Palo! — Palo! Live
- Prince Royce — 'Soy el Mismo

Best Traditional Tropical Album

La Sonora Santanera — Grandes Exitos de Las Sonoras: Con La Más Grande, La Sonora Santanera

- Alquimia La Sonora Del XXI — Sentimiento Anacobero
- Eliades Ochoa and El Cuarteto Patria — El Eliades Que Soy
- Pijuan and Los Baby Boomer Boys — Solo Pa' Los Jóvenes... de Corazón
- Viento de Agua — Opus IV

Best Tropical Song

Andrés Castro and Carlos Vives — "Cuando Nos Volvamos a Encontrar" (Carlos Vives featuring Marc Anthony)

- Andrés Castro, Guianko Gómez, Juan Riveros and Prince Royce — "Darte un Beso" (Prince Royce)
- Descemer Bueno and Enrique Iglesias — "Loco" (Enrique Iglesias featuring Romeo Santos)
- Jorge Luis Chacin and Fernando Osorio — "Regalo" (Rey Ruiz)
- Johann Morales — "Te Doy Mi Voz" (Ronald Borjas)

=== Singer-songwriter ===
Best Singer-Songwriter Album

Jorge Drexler — Bailar en la Cueva

- Ricardo Arjona — Viaje
- Andrés Calamaro — Bohemio
- Pablo Milanés — Renacimiento
- Rosana — 8 Lunas

=== Regional Mexican ===
Best Ranchero Album

Pepe Aguilar — Lástima Que Sean Ajenas

- Oscar Cruz — ¿Quien Dice Que No?
- Vicente Fernández — Mano a Mano Tangos a La Manera de Vicente Fernández
- Olivia Gorra — Bésame Mucho España
- Juan Montalvo — Mujeres Divinas

Best Banda Album

Banda El Recodo De Don Cruz Lizarraga — Haciendo Historia

- Cristina — Grandes Canciones
- La Arrolladora Banda El Limón — Gracias Por Creer
- La Original Banda El Limón De Salvador Lizárraga — Fin De Semana'
- Luz María — Lágrimas y Lluvia

Best Tejano Album

Jimmy González & Grupo Mazz — Forever Mazz

- Chente Barrera — ¡Viva Tejano!
- Grupo Alamo — Seguimos Soñando
- Shelly Lares — De Mi Corazón
- Jay Pérez — Anthology Back In The Day

Best Norteño Album

Conjunto Primavera — Amor Amor

- El Poder Del Norte — XX Años
- Los Rieleros del Norte — En Tus Manos
- Pesado — Por Ti
- Polo Urias y Su Máquina Norteña — Clásicas De Ayer Y Siempre

Best Regional Song

Marco Antonio Solís — "De Mil Amores"

- José Luis Roma — "Amor Amor" (Conjunto Primavera)
- Mario Alberto Zapata — "Cuando Estás De Buenas" (Pesado)
- Paulina Aguirre and Alberto "Beto" Jiménez Maeda — "Mirando Hacia Arriba" (Mariachi Divas de Cindy Shea)
- Afid Ferrer — Tonto Corazón (Siggno)

=== Instrumental ===
Best Instrumental Album

Arturo O'Farrill and the Chico O'Farrill Afro-Cuban Jazz Orchestra — Final Night at Birdland

- Antonio Adolfo — O Piano de Antonio Adolfo
- Yamandu Costa — Continente
- Hamilton de Holanda — Caprichos
- Mónica Fuquen — Esferas de Creación

=== Traditional ===
Best Folk Album

Lila Downs, Niña Pastori and Soledad — Raíz

- Albita, Eva Ayllón and Olga Cerpa — Mujeres Con Cajones
- C4 Trío and Rafael "Pollo" Brito — De Repente
- Orozco - Barrientos — Tinto
- Totó la Momposina — El Asunto

Best Tango Album

Rubén Blades — Tangos

- Carlos Franzetti — In The Key Of Tango
- Mónica Navarro — Calle
- Tanghetto — Hybrid Tango II
- Marianela Villalobos — Amor y Tango

Best Flamenco Album

Paco de Lucía — Canción Andaluza

- Juan Carmona — Alchemya'
- Enrique Morente — Morente
- Juan Pinilla and Fernando Valverde — Jugar Con Fuego
- Rosario La Tremendita — Fatum

=== Jazz ===
Best Latin Jazz Album

Chick Corea — The Vigil
Paquito D'Rivera and Trio Corrente — Song For Maura

- Juan Garcia-Herreros — Normas
- Arturo O'Farril and the Afro Latin Jazz Orchestra — The Offense Of The Drum
- Luisito Quintero — 3rd Element

=== Christian ===
Best Spanish Christian Album

Danilo Montero — La Carta Perfecta - En Vivo

- Amor Mercy — Desde Arriba Todo Se Ve Differente
- Lenny Salcedo — Nuevo
- Nirlon Sánchez — Es El Tiempo De Dios
- Marcos Vidal — Sigo Esperándote
- Marcos Witt — Sigues Siendo Dios
- Coalo Zamorano — Confesiones De Un Corazón Agradecido

Best Portuguese Christian Album

Aline Barros — Graça

- Anderson Freire — Anderson Freire E Amigos
- Jotta A — Geração De Jesus
- Soraya Moraes — Céu Na Terra
- Renascer Praise — Renascer Praise 18 - Canto De Sião

=== Brazilian ===
Best Brazilian Contemporary Pop Album

Ivete Sangalo — Multishow Ao Vivo – Ivete Sangalo 20 Anos

- Marília Bessy and Ney Matogrosso — Infernynho - Marília Bessy Convida Ney Matogrosso
- Ana Carolina — #AC
- Vanessa da Mata — Segue o Som
- Jota Quest — Funky Funky Boom Boom

Best Brazilian Rock Album

Erasmo Carlos — Gigante Gentil

- Charlie Brown Jr. — La Familia 013
- O Rappa — Nunca Tem Fim...
- Nando Reis e Os Infernais — Sei, Como Foi Em BH
- Titãs — Nheengatu

Best Samba/Pagode Album

Maria Rita — Coração a Batucar

- Alcione — Eterna Alegria Ao Vivo
- Martinho da Vila — Enredo
- Paula Lima — O Samba É Do Bem
- Diogo Nogueira — Mais Amor

Best MPB Album

Marisa Monte — Verdade, Uma Ilusão

- Zeca Baleiro — Calma Aí, Coração - Ao Vivo
- Jeneci — De Graça
- Ivan Lins & InventaRio — InventaRio Encontra Ivan Lins
- Nana, Dori and Danilo — Caymmi

Best Sertaneja Music Album

Sérgio Reis — Questão De Tempo

- Chitãozinho & Xororó — Do Tamanho Do Nosso Amor - Ao Vivo
- Paula Fernandes — Multishow Ao Vivo – Um Ser Amor
- Rick & Renner — Bom De Dança Vol. 2
- Victor & Leo — Viva Por Mim

Best Brazilian Roots Album

Falamansa — Amigo Velho

- Cajú & Castanha — Meu Deus Que País É Esse!
- Toninho Ferragutti e Neymar Dias — Festa Na Roça
- Tavinho Moura — Minhas Canções Inacabadas
- Quinteto Violado — Quinteto Canta Gonzagão
- Alceu Valença — Amigo Da Arte

Best Brazilian Song

Caetano Veloso — "A Bossa Nova É Foda"

- Dori Caymmi and Paulo Cesar Pinheiro — "Alguma Voz" (Dori Caymmi)
- Zeca Baleiro and Hyldon — "Calma Aí, Coração"
- Maria Bethânia and Paulo César Pinheiro — "Carta De Amor"
- Vanessa da Mata — "Segue O Som"
- Paula Fernandes — "Um Ser Amor"
- Anitta, Jefferson Junior and Umberto Tavares — "Zen" (Anitta)

=== Children's ===
Best Latin Children's Album

Marta Gómez and Friends — Coloreando: Traditional Songs For Children In Spanish

- Mister G — ABC Fiesta
- Rita Rosa — Rumba Flora: La Historia De Uva Y Garbancito
- Thalía — Viva Kids Vol. 1
- Xuxa — XSPB 12

=== Classical ===
Best Classical Album

Plácido Domingo — Verdi

- Facundo Ramírez — A Piazzolla A Ramírez
- Allison Brewster Franzetti — Alma - Piano Music Of Argentina
- José Serebrier — Dvorák: Symphony No. 2 - 3 Slavonic Dances
- Manuel Barrueco and the Symphony Orchestra of Tenerife — Medea
- National Symphony Orchestra of Costa Rica — Musica De Compositores Costarricenses Vol.1
- Berta Rojas — Salsa Roja

Best Classical Contemporary Composition

Claudia Montero — "Concierto Para Violín y Orquesta de Cuerdas"

- Gustavo Casenave — "Bicho Feeling Home Piano Solo"
- Arlene Sierra — "Moler"
- Yalil Guerra — "String Quartet No.2"
- Gabriela Ortiz — "¡Únicamente La Verdad!, La Auténtica Historia de Camelia La Texana"

=== Recording Package ===
Best Recording Package

Wed 21 — Alejandro Ros (Juana Molina)

- Alfredo Enciso — Activistas (Nonpalidece)
- Rafael Rocha — Antes Que Tu Conte Outra (Apanhador Só)
- Giovanni Nésterez — Combi (Lucho Quequezana)
- Laura Varsky — Ocho(Marco Sanguinetti)

=== Production ===
Best Engineered Album

Juber Anbín, Johnnatan García, Rodner Padilla, Eduardo Pulgar, Vladimir Quintero Mora, Jean Sánchez, Alexander Vanlawren, Germán Landaeta, Darío Peñaloza and Germán Landaeta — De Repente (C4 Trío and Rafael "Pollo" Brito)

- Facundo Rodríguez — Miss Delirios (Sandra Márquez)
- Javier Limón, Salomé Limón, Marian G. Villota and Caco Refojo — Promesas De Tierra
- Roger Freret, Claudio Spiewak and Felipe Tichauer — Rio, Choro, Jazz... (Antonio Adolfo)
- Juan Switalski — 21st Century Lyrical Clarinet Concertos (Eleanor Weingartner)

Producer of the Year

Sergio George

- Rafa Arcaute
- Eduardo Cabra
- Andrés Castro
- Moreno Veloso

=== Music video ===
Best Short Form Music Video

La Vida Bohème — "Flamingo"

- Babasónicos — "La Lanza"
- Calle 13 — "Adentro"
- Nach — "Me Llaman"
- Zoé — "Arrullo De Estrellas"

Best Long Form Music Video

Café Tacuba — El Objeto Antes Llamado Disco, La Película

- Jesse & Joy — Soltando al Perro
- Santana — Corazón: Live From Mexico - Live It To Believe It
- Various Artists — Música En Tiempos
- Various Artists — Triana Pura y Pura

== Special Merit Awards ==
The following is a list of special merit awards

Lifetime Achievement Awards

- Willy Chirino
- Los Lobos
- Valeria Lynch
- César Costa
- Carlos do Carmo
- Dúo Dinámico
- Ney Matogrosso

Trustees Award

- André Midani
- Juan Vicente Torrealba

== Performers ==
- Intro — "Latin Grammy 2014"
- Calle 13 — "El Aguante"
- Ricky Martin and Camila — "Perdón"
- J Balvin — "Ay Vamos"
- Pepe Aguilar featuring Miguel Bosé — "La Ley del Monte / Siempre En Mi Mente"
- Mariana Vega, Pablo López and Aneeka — "De Tu Voz / VI / Ojo Por Ojo"
- Carlos Vives featuring ChocQuibTown and Marc Anthony — "El Mar de Sus Ojos / Cuando Nos Volvamos a Encontrar"
- Wisin, Pitbull and Chris Brown — "Control"
- Rubén Blades — "Pedro Navaja"
- Yandel, Gadiel and Farruko — "Plakito"
- Juanes — "Me Enamora / La Camisa Negra / La Luz"
- Magic! featuring Marc Anthony — "Rude"
- Ricky Martin — "Adiós"
- Pitbull and Carlos Santana — "Oye Como Va"
- La Original Banda El Limón and Río Roma — "Fin de Semana / No Me Dolió"

== Presenters ==
- Natalia Jiménez, Kuno Becker and Jorge Drexler — presented Best Salsa Album
- Sebastián Rulli and Angelique Boyer — presented Album of the Year
- Lila Downs, Niña Pastori and Soledad — presented Song of the Year
- Roselyn Sánchez — introduced Carlos Vives
- Best Ranchero Album
- Adrián Uribe and Eugenio Derbez — introduced Wisin, Pitbull and Chris Brown
- Maite Perroni and Prince Royce — presented Best New Artist
- Eiza González and Carlos PenaVega — presented Best Contemporary Tropical Album
- Jaime Camil and Alessandra Ambrosio — presented Best Contemporary Pop Vocal Album
- Debi Nova and Daniel Arenas — presented Record of the Year
- Joaquín Sabina — presented Person of the Year

== Changes to award categories ==
Best Tropical Fusion Album was combined with Best Contemporary Tropical Album.
