= List of awards and nominations received by ChocQuibTown =

ChocQuibTown is a Colombian hip-hop group.

== Awards ==
=== Grammy Awards ===
Year	Nominee / work	Award	Result
2011	Oro	Best Latin Rock, Alternative or Urban Album	Nominated
2015	Behind the Machine	Best Latin Rock, Alternative or Urban Album	Nominated

=== Latin Grammy Awards ===
A Latin Grammy Award is an accolade by the Latin Academy of Recording Arts & Sciences to recognize outstanding achievement in the music industry.

Year	Nominee / work	Award	Result
2009	ChocQuibTown	Best New Artist	Nominated
2010	"De Donde Vengo Yo"	Best Alternative Song	Won
2012	"Calentura" (featuring Tego Calderón & Zully Murillo)	Record of the Year	Nominated
2012	Eso Es Lo Que Hay	Album of the Year	Nominated
2012	Eso Es Lo Que Hay	Best Alternative Music Album	Nominated
2014	"El Mar de Sus Ojos" (featuring Carlos Vives)	Record of the Year	Nominated
2015	"El Mismo"	Best Tropical Fusion Album	Won

=== Premios Nuestra Tierra ===
A Premio Nuestra Tierra is an accolade that recognizes outstanding achievement in the Colombian music industry. ChocQuibTown has been nominated six times and received four awards.

Year	Nominee / work	Award	Result
2011	ChocQuibTown	Best Artist of the Year	Nominated
2011	"De Donde Vengo Yo"	Best Urban Interpretation of the Year	Won
2011	ChocQuibTown	Best Urban Solo Artist or Group of the Year	Won
2011	"De Donde Vengo Yo"	Best Folk Interpretation of the Year	Won
2014	Behind the Machine	Album of the Year	Nominated
2011	"Uh La La"	Best Alternative Performance	Won

=== Premios Shock (Colombia) ===
Year	Nominee / work	Award	Result
2010	ChocQuibTown	Best Group of the Year	Won
2010	Goyo (for Oro)	Voice of the Year	Won
2011	ChocQuibTown	Artist of the Year	Won

=== Premios Lo Nuestro (Americas) ===
Year	Nominee / work	Award	Result
2011	"De Donde Vengo Yo"	Best Video	Nominated

Awards
Preceded by Mónica Giraldo	Colombian Artist for Best New Artist Latin Grammy; 2009; ChocQuibTown	Succeeded by Piso 21
