= Vivir es hoy =

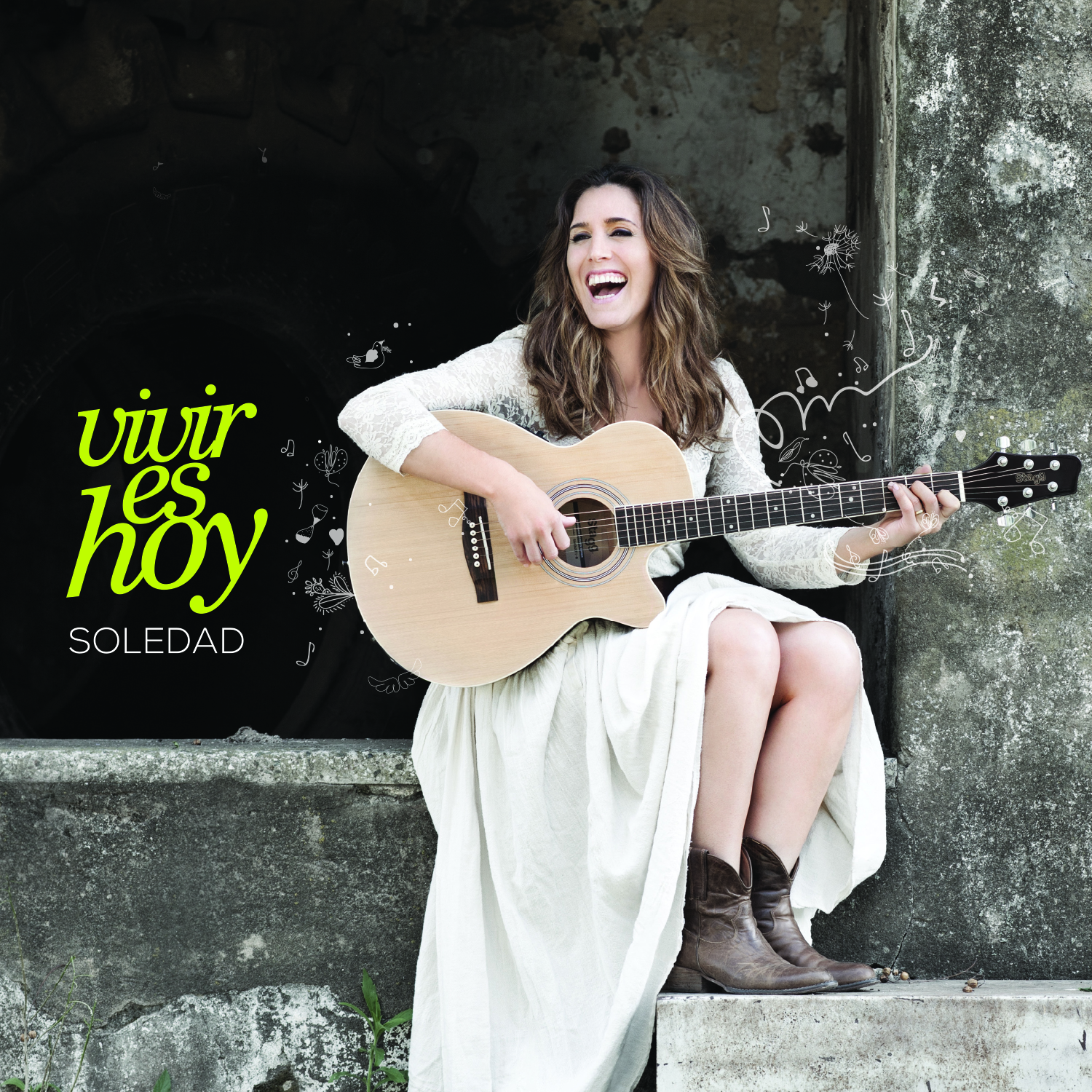

Studio album by Soledad Pastorutti
- Released: 10 March 2015
- Genre: Latin folk, Latin pop
- Length: 57:31
- Label: Sony Music
- Producer: Gian Marco, Matías Zapata

Vivir es hoy is a studio album by the Argentine singer Soledad Pastorutti, released by Sony Music on 10 March 2015. The album is a fusion of Latin pop and Latin folk, produced by Gian Marco and Matías Zapata, and recorded in Buenos Aires and Los Angeles.

== Background ==
It took a little more than two years to create the album, and Soledad has spoken on occasions to the press about the creation of the album.

Taking as a reference the work embodied in Raíz, a collaborative album released the previous year that united her with Lila Downs and Niña Pastori, Soledad confided during an interview with Télam, "I needed people to know where I wanted to go and could go. In Raíz we found this fusion thing that sounds like a hybrid to no one, it's like natural and it's what I expected. So now I decided to move forward with the idea of being able to mix pop with folk music of Argentine and of all of Latin America. With this album I was discovering what things are better. Instead of taking songs from here to there, I looked for songs from everywhere to take them to another place".

In that same Télam interview, speaking about "Aleluya", Soledad said, "Matías told me about this song, I did the translation of the lyrics and we turned it into the style of folk music from the north of Argentina, and only later Matías let me listen to the versions of Cohen and Jeff Buckley that are so moving they make your blood run cold."

Speaking to the press at a reception in a mansion in the Núñez neighborhood, in the north of Buenos Aires, Soledad revealed how she invited Carlos Santana to perform on the album: "What I did was send him an email, telling him a little about the aim of the song because for us the guitar is fundamental and I always had the fantasy that he would record on some album. Maybe it was crazy, but I didn't want to miss the opportunity."

== Track listing ==
No.	Title	Writer(s)	Producer	Length
1.	"Vivir es hoy" (feat. Carlos Santana)	Soledad Pastorutti • Pablo Santos	Matías Zapata	4:26
2.	"Dame una sonrisa" (feat. Carlos Vives)	Gian Marco • Cheche Alara • Carlos Vives	Gian Marco	3:39
3.	"Todos somos pueblo"	Gian Marco	Gian Marco	3:47
4.	"Cielo de Mantilla"	Teresa Parodi • Mateo Villalba	Matías Zapata	3:47
5.	"Como te voy a olvidar" (feat. Spanish: Natalia Pastorutti)	Jorge Mejía Avante	Matías Zapata	3:37
6.	"Cielo de rosas"	Soledad Pastorutti • Pablo Santos • Matías Zapata	Matías Zapata	3:19
7.	"Nadie que te quiera como yo"	Edgardo Marcelo Germano • Carlos Roberto Rivero • Norberto Claudio Kirovsky	Matías Zapata	3:13
8.	"Eres"	Soledad Pastorutti • Pablo Santos	Matías Zapata	4:14
9.	"Mal paso"	Spanish: Luis Abelardo Nuñez	Matías Zapata	3:22
10.	"Una mañana nueva sin ti"	Claudia Brant • Gian Marco	Gian Marco	3:53
11.	"Estrella fugaz" (feat. Zezé Di Camargo)	Matías Zapata • Pablo Cordero	Matías Zapata	3:01
12.	"Cuando me abandone mi alma"	Pablo Raúl Trullenque • Spanish: Cuti Carabajal	Matías Zapata	3:10
13.	"Imagina"	Gian Marco	Gian Marco	3:38
14.	"Todo lo que quiero eres tú" (feat. Gian Marco)	Gian Marco	Gian Marco	3:50
15.	"Cantante"	Pablo Cordero	Matías Zapata	2:32
16.	"Aleluya" (Hallelujah)	Leonard Cohen	Matías Zapata	4:15

== Production ==
Tracks produced by Gian Marco

- recorded in Enjoy Music Studios, Los Angeles; recording engineer: Gian Marco
- drums, bass, and piano recorded in The Sound Factory, Los Angeles; recording engineer: Adrian Bernabé Trujillo
- accordion in "Dame Una Sonrisa": On The Groove Studio, Miami; recording engineers: Andrés Castro and Luis Barrera
- charangos and quenas: Cabina Libre Studio, Lima, Peru; recording engineer: Alfredo Quequezana
- cello: Xtrings Studio, Miami; recording engineer: Pedro Alfonso
- mixing: David Santos, Digisound Mastering, Los Angeles

Tracks produced by Matías Zapata

- recorded in Estudio Bulo and Cuartito Estudio, Buenos Aires, Argentina
- voices recorded by Daniel Ianniruberto in Estudio El Charquito, Buenos Aires
- horn section recorded in Estudio Sudestadahorns, Buenos Aires
- recording engineers: Nacho De La Riega and Matías Zapata
- mixed in Estudio El Charquito, Buenos Aires, by Daniel Ianniruberto and Matías Zapata
- music production of "Estrella Fugaz":

Spanish voice direction of Zezé Di Camargo: Lucas Robles
production assistant: Helio Bernal
recording technician: Paulo Penov
editing and tuning: Enrico Nunes
recorded by Silas Godoy in Mosh Studios, São Paulo

Mastering: Nicolás Kalwill
