= La Otra Lola =

Spanish female impersonator (died 2020)

La Otra Lola, also known as Juan Gallo, stage names of Juan Moreno (died 14 October 2020), was a Spanish female impersonator and imitator of Lola Flores.

== Career ==
Juan Moreno initially worked as a seamster until he first performed as a female impersonator sometime between 1970 and 1971, when he entered a contest dressed as Lola Flores and was declared the winner. In his early days, he imitated personalities such as Las Grecas, Marifé de Triana, Juanita Reina, and Lina Morgan.

As his career progressed, he focused his character exclusively on the singer, actress, and flamenco dancer Lola Flores, who would eventually become a close friend. This led him to adopt the stage name La Otra Lola. According to Lola Flores herself, Juan Gallo was her best imitator during her lifetime.

In 1981, he appeared in the comedy film with LGBT themes Gay Club, directed by Tito Fernández and also featuring female impersonator Paco España.

Throughout his career, he performed not only in Spain but also in Buenos Aires and Puerto Rico. By 2015, he had already retired from performing due to health problems after suffering a stroke.

== Filmography ==
- Gay Club (1981)
- Los ladrones van a la oficina (1994)

== Death ==
La Otra Lola died on 14 October 2020 and was publicly mourned on social media by then-MP Carla Antonelli, as well as by drag artist Samantha Ballentines.

== Tributes ==
Journalist and writer Valeria Vegas included the story and biography of La Otra Lola in her book Libérate: La cultura LGTBQ que abrió camino en España ("Liberate: The LGBTQ Culture That Paved the Way in Spain"), considering her a pioneer in LGBT visibility in the country.

La Otra Lola was also remembered in the book Flores para Lola by Carlos Barea, which explores the impact of Lola Flores on queer dissent and the feminist movement in Spain.
