= Más + Corazón Profundo =

Studio album by Carlos Vives
- Released: May 13, 2014
- Label: Sony Music Latin
- Producers: Carlos Vives; Andrés Castro

Carlos Vives chronology
Corazón Profundo (2013)	Más + Corazón Profundo (2014)	Spotify Sessions (2014)

Singles from Carlos Vives
- 1. "El Mar de Sus Ojos" Released: March 3, 2014; 2. "Cuando Nos Volvamos a Encontrar" Released: April 28, 2014; 3. "Ella Es Mi Fiesta" Released: October 21, 2014; 4. "Las Cosas de la Vida" Released: August 31, 2015

Más + Corazón Profundo (transl. More + Deep Heart) is the fourteenth studio album by Colombian singer-songwriter Carlos Vives, was released on May 13, 2014 by Sony Music Latin. The album was nominated for Album of the Year and was awarded Best Contemporary Tropical Album at the 2014 Latin Grammy Awards. It won the Grammy Awards in 2015 for Best Tropical Latin Album.

== Track listing ==
Más + Corazón Profundo — Standard edition
No.	Title	Writer(s)	Producer(s)	Length
1.	"El Mar de Sus Ojos" (featuring ChocQuibTown)	Carlos Vives; Hugo Huertas; ChocQuibTown	Hugo Huertas	3:53
2.	"Cuando Nos Volvamos a Encontrar" (featuring Marc Anthony)	Vives; Andres Castro	Vives, Castro	4:38
3.	"Un Pobre Loco"	Vives	Vives; Castro	3:56
4.	"Ella Es Mi Fiesta"	Vives	Vives; Castro	4:06
5.	"Mil Canciones"	Vives	Vives, Castro	3:08
6.	"El Sueño"	Vives	Vives; Castro	4:04
7.	"Las Cosas de la Vida"	Vives	Vives; Castro	3:27
8.	"Hijo del Vallenato"	Vives	Vives	3:47
9.	"La Cumbia de Todos"	Vives	Carlos Ivan Medina; Vives; Castro	4:18
10.	"Sueños Rotos"	Vives	Vives; Medina	4:17

Más + Corazón Profundo — US iTunes Store bonus track
No.	Title	Writer(s)	Producer(s)	Length
11.	"Volví a Nacer" (Extended Version)	Vives; Castro	Vives; Castro	4:03
12.	"La Foto de los Dos" (Salsa Version)	Vives; Castro	Vives; Castro	3:46
13.	"La Copa de Todos" (featuring Monobloco and David Correy)	Antonina Armato; Tim James	Armato; James; Mario Caldato, Jr.; Rock Mafia; Vives; Castro	3:09
14.	"La Copa de Todos" (featuring Monobloco and Gaby Amarantos)	Armato; James	Armato; James; Caldato; Rock Mafia; Vives; Castro	3:09

Más + Corazón Profundo — Colombian Special Edition CD/DVD
No.	Title	Length
11.	"Volví a Nacer" (Extended Version)	4:03
12.	"La Foto de los Dos" (Salsa Version)	3:46
13.	"La Copa de Todos" (featuring Monobloco and David Correy)	3:09
14.	"Volví a Nacer" (music video)	5:04
15.	"Volví a Nacer" (Behind the scenes)	1:35
16.	"Como Le Gusta a Tu Cuerpo" (Music video)	3:58
17.	"Como Le Gusta a Tu Cuerpo" (Behind the scenes)	11:11
18.	"Bailar Contigo" (Music video)	4:55
19.	"Bailar Contigo" (Behind the scenes)	6:24
20.	"La Foto de los Dos" (Music video)	4:41
21.	"La Foto de los Dos" (Behind the scenes)	8:18
22.	"El Mar de Sus Ojos" (Music video)	4:15
23.	"El Mar de Sus Ojos" (Behind the scenes)	6:19

== Charts ==
=== Weekly charts ===
Chart (2014)	Peak position
Argentine Albums (CAPIF)	8
Spanish Albums (Promusicae)	66
US Top Latin Albums (Billboard)	5
US Latin Pop Albums (Billboard)	3

=== Year-end charts ===
Chart (2014)	Position
US Latin Albums	60
US Latin Pop Albums	13

== Certifications ==
Region	Certification	Certified units/sales
Mexico (AMPROFON)	Gold	30,000^{‡}
United States (RIAA)	Platinum (Latin)	60,000^{‡}
^{‡} Sales+streaming figures based on certification alone.
