= Cuando nos volvamos a encontrar =

2014 single by Carlos Vives

Single by Carlos Vives featuring Marc Anthony

from the album Más + Corazón Profundo
- Released: April 28, 2014
- Genre: Tropipop
- Length: 4:38
- Label: Sony Music Latin
- Songwriters: Carlos Vives; Andrés Castro

Carlos Vives singles chronology
"El Mar de Sus Ojos" (2014)	"Cuando nos volvamos a encontrar" (2014)	"Ella Es Mi Fiesta" (2014)

Marc Anthony singles chronology
"Se Se Fué" (2014)	"Cuando nos volvamos a encontrar" (2014)	"Flor Pálida" (2014)

"Cuando nos volvamos a encontrar" (transl. "When We Meet Again") is a song by Colombian singer-songwriter Carlos Vives featuring the American singer Marc Anthony, for his fourteenth studio album Más + Corazón Profundo (2014). The song was released by Sony Music Latin as the second single from the record.

The song served as the main theme for the Chilean telenovela, Pituca Sin Lucas. Even, Vives travelled to Chile in August 2014 to film the music video for the telenovela. "Cuando Nos Volvamos a Encontrar" won the Latin Grammy Award for Best Tropical Song. "Cuando Nos Volvamos a Encontrar" was nominated for Tropical Collaboration of the Year and the music video for Video of the Year at the Lo Nuestro Awards of 2015.

== Track listing ==
- Digital download
1. "Cuando Nos Volvamos a Encontrar" - 4:38

== Charts ==
=== Weekly charts ===
Chart (2014)	Peak position
Colombia (National-Report)	1
Dominican Republic Pop Chart (Monitor Latino)	8
Spanish Airplay (PROMUSICAE)	28
US Hot Latin Songs (Billboard)	10
US Latin Airplay (Billboard)	1
US Latin Pop Airplay (Billboard)	2
US Tropical Airplay (Billboard)	1
Venezuela (Record Report)	1

=== Year-end charts ===
Chart (2014)	Position
US Latin Songs	24
US Latin Pop Songs	7
US Latin Tropical Airplay	7

== Certifications ==
Region	Certification	Certified units/sales
United States (RIAA)	6× Platinum (Latin)	360,000^{‡}
^{‡} Sales+streaming figures based on certification alone.

== See also ==
- List of Billboard number-one Latin songs of 2014
