= Mónica Navarro =

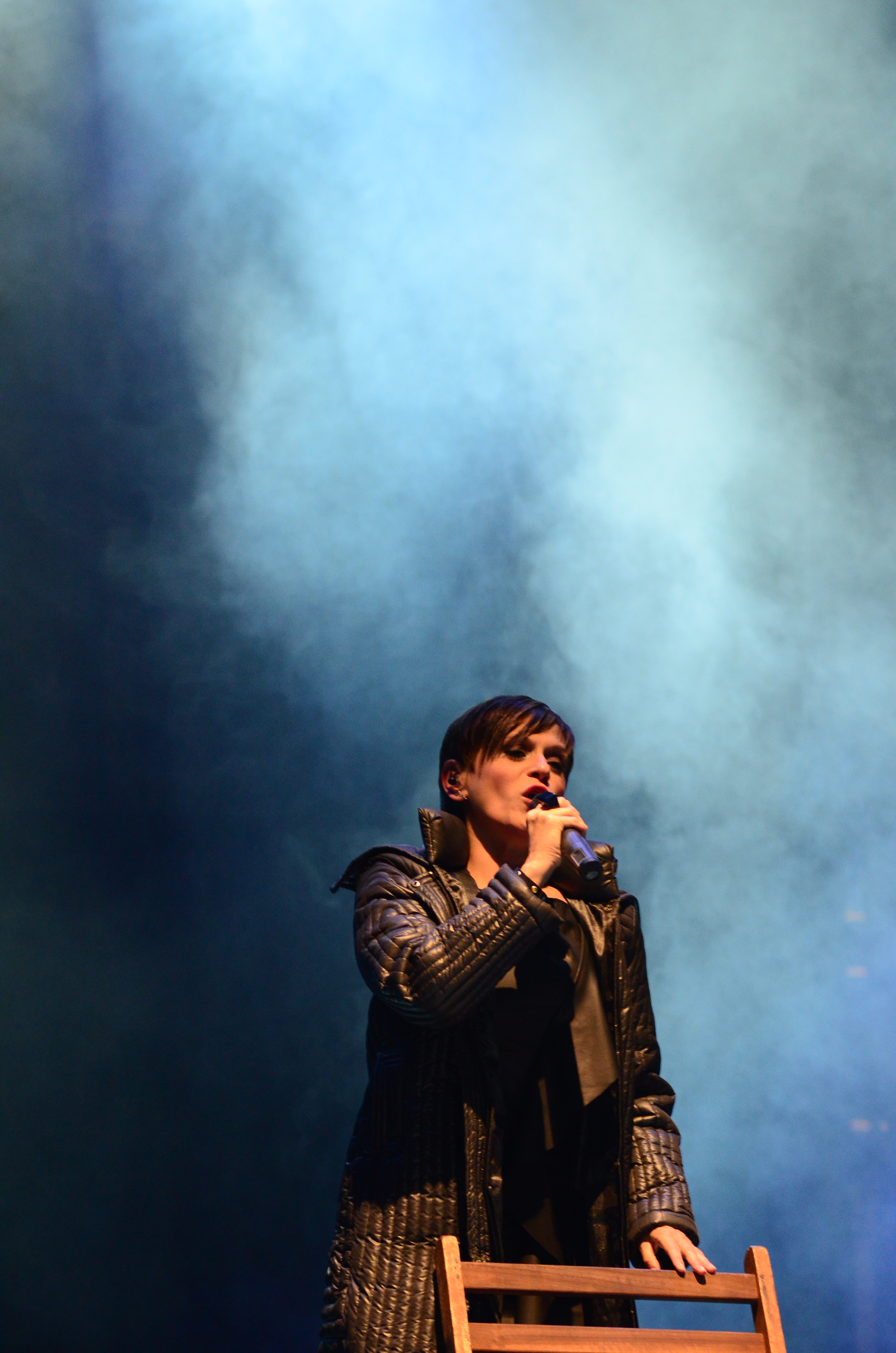
- Mónica Navarro

Background information
- Born: October 30, 1968 (age 56); Argentina Buenos Aires
- Genres: Tango popular music
- Occupation(s): Singer, actress
- Instrument: Vocals
- Years active: 1984–
- Website: https://www.facebook.com/pages/M%C3%B3nica-Navarro/49015463428

Mónica Navarro (born October 30, 1968) is a Tango singer and actress from Buenos Aires, Argentina. She resides in Montevideo, Uruguay. Her album Calle was nominated Latin Grammy Awards of 2014 for Best Tango Album.
