= Corazón (Santana album) =

Studio album by Santana
- Released: May 6, 2014
- Studios: Odds On Studios, Las Vegas; The Bank, Burbank (tracks 1, 2, 4, 5, 7, 12); Cia. dos Técnicos Studio, Rio de Janeiro, Brazil (Spanish-language vocals of "Saideira"); ART House Studio, Miami (Spanish-language vocals of "Amor Correspondido"); Crescent Moon Studios, Miami ("Beijo de Longe"); Art Dealer Chic Studios, Los Angeles ("Indy"); Tarpan Studios, San Rafael (tracks 10 and 11); Ocean Way Recording, Hollywood ("Iron Lion Zyon")
- Genre: Latin rock
- Length: 45:20
- Label: RCA/Sony Latin Iberia
- Producer: Lester Mendez

Santana chronology
Shape Shifter (2012)	Corazón (2014)	Corazón – Live from Mexico: Live It To Believe It (2014)

Corazón is the twenty-third studio album (thirty-seventh album overall) by Santana, released on May 6, 2014.

Produced by Lester Mendez, the album features collaborations with various singers like Gloria Estefan, Ziggy Marley and Cindy Blackman.

"La Flaca" featuring Juanes, the first single from the album, was released in November 2013. The album was certified double platinum in the Latin category (Disco de Platino) by the RIAA for shipping over 120,000 copies in the United States; furthermore, it has sold over 95,000 copies in the country according to Nielsen SoundScan.

== Reception ==
=== Critical reception ===
Professional ratings
Aggregate scores
Source	Rating
Metacritic	60/100
Review scores
Source	Rating
AllMusic	3.5/5 stars
Rolling Stone	3/5 stars
The Independent	3/5 stars
New York Daily News	2/5 stars
Ultimate Guitar Archive	6/10

The album received mixed to positive reviews by critics. Rolling Stone's Will Hermes considered the album a Latin pop version of Supernatural and that its music "remains an unmistakable, undeniable sound". Thom Jurek from AllMusic felt "Santana actually sounds hungry again" and stated that "while some of these cuts are forgettable, his inventive engagement with Latin pop here is not only successful, but satisfying". Billboard's Leila Cobo considered the album to be guitar-driven despite the many vocalists. Overall, she praised the album, but pointed a few songs that she considered not to have worked, such as "Feel It Coming Back", in which she felt that Diego Torres struggled with the language; and "Indy", in which Miguel's improvisations "lack structure and tend to meander". Jeremy Williams-Chalmers from So So Gay felt the album might "be the record that finally knocks Supernatural off its throne as Santana's definitive release" and considered it to be "everything a Santana record needs to be", while joining Cobo on criticizing Torres' English skills. The Independent's Nick Coleman said the album "contains a brightly recorded, punchy collection of 'Latin' beats and melodies, plus some rock, featuring a handful of distinguished guests and the familiar overflying drone of Carlos's own guitar obbligati" and that it "is certain to be a hit in its target territories".

Relix's Bill Murphy considered Carlos Santana's guitar playing in the album to be the "best he's done in decades" and felt that "where too many cooks may have overwhelmed Supernatural, Corazón simmers with spicy variety". Jon Pareles, writing for The New York Times, considered the songs to be radio-aimed and described the contrast between Santana's guitar and the guest singers vocals as follows: "The way Mr. Santana answers the lyrics and grapples for the foreground until verse and chorus gave way to full-fledged guitar solos is the audio equivalent of photobombing the lead vocal. Luckily, Mr. Santana's guitar can be as impassioned as any singer's voice." However, he considered some tracks (such as "Oye 2014" and "Yo Soy La Luz") to be "awkward moments".

Writing for New York Daily News, Jim Farber was not so impressed by the album. He criticized it being promoted as a Latin pop album while having half of its lyrics in English. He also saw negatively the artists chosen for this album: "Santana's glistening leads compete with, rather than complement, these artists. [...] Latin alternative music features so many artists who would have paired better with Santana's style. [...] Wrangling artists like those would have made this album a true first". Ultimate Guitar Archive's team felt Santana himself had little space in some of the songs and considered the album to be "a compilation of well formulated, radio-friendly Latino pop which often times ends up sounding somewhat bizarre". They also labeled the lyrics as "repetitive" and concluded by saying: "The outcome which appears on [...] Corazon falls short of any preset expectations. [...] Considering the album's pop-driven outcome it leaves the listener puzzled as to where Santana was hoping to proceed with this effort".

=== Accolades ===
The album was nominated for Best Contemporary Pop Vocal Album at the Latin Grammy Awards of 2014.

== Track listing ==
=== Standard edition ===
Standard edition
No.	Title	Music	Original artist	Length
1.	"Saideira (Spanish version)" (featuring Samuel Rosa)	Samuel Rosa, Rodrigo F. Leão	Skank	3:55
2.	"La Flaca" (featuring Juanes)	Pau Donés	Jarabe de Palo	4:11
3.	"Mal Bicho" (featuring Los Fabulosos Cadillacs)	Flavio Oscar Cianciarulo	Los Fabulosos Cadillacs	3:38
4.	"Oye 2014" (featuring Pitbull, remixed version of Santana's cover of "Oye Como Va", released in their 1970 album Abraxas)	Ernesto "Tito" Puente, Niles Hollowell-Dhar, Amando Christian Perez	Tito Puente	3:24
5.	"Iron Lion Zion" (featuring Ziggy Marley & ChocQuibTown)	Bob Marley	Bob Marley	4:32
6.	"Una Noche en Nápoles" (featuring Lila Downs, Niña Pastori & Soledad)	Thomas Mack Lauderdale, China F. Forbes	Pink Martini	4:30
7.	"Besos de Lejos" (featuring Gloria Estefan)	Teofilo Chantre, Gerard Mendes	Boy Gé Mendes	4:17
8.	"Margarita" (featuring Romeo Santos)	Romeo Santos		4:01
9.	"Indy" (featuring Miguel)	Miguel Pimentel		3:26
10.	"Feel It Coming Back" (featuring Diego Torres)	Rafael Esparza-Ruiz, Yoel Henríquez		4:10
11.	"Yo Soy La Luz" (featuring Wayne Shorter & Cindy Blackman)	Carlos Santana		4:06
12.	"I See Your Face"	Bola Sete	Bola Sete	1:19

Corazón – Deluxe edition bonus tracks
No.	Title	Music	Original artist	Length
13.	"Saideira" (featuring Samuel Rosa)	Samuel Rosa, Rodrigo F. Leão	Skank	3:55
14.	"Beijo de Longe" (Portuguese-language version of "Besos de Lejos" (featuring Gloria Estefan))	Teofilo Chantre, Gerard Mendes	Boy Gé Mendes	4:17
15.	"Amor Correspondido" (Spanish-language version of "Feel It Coming Back") (featuring Diego Torres)	Rafael Esparza-Ruiz, Yoel Enríquez		4:10
16.	"Santana: The Making of Corazón" (Directed by Lourival Rodriguez & Ruslan Shakirov)			32:10

=== Latin American edition ===
Corazón – Latin American edition
No.	Title	Music	Original artist	Length
1.	"Saideira" (featuring Samuel Rosa)	Samuel Rosa, Rodrigo F. Leão	Skank	3:55
2.	"La Flaca" (featuring Juanes)	Pau Donés	Jarabe de Palo	4:11
3.	"Mal Bicho" (featuring Los Fabulosos Cadillacs)	Flavio Oscar Cianciarulo	Los Fabulosos Cadillacs	3:38
4.	"Amor Correspondido" (featuring Diego Torres)	Rafael Esparza-Ruiz, Yoel Henríquez		4:10
5.	"Una Noche en Nápoles" (featuring Lila Downs, Niña Pastori & Soledad)	Thomas Mack Lauderdale, China F. Forbes	Pink Martini	4:30
6.	"Beijo de Longe" (featuring Gloria Estefan)	Teofilo Chantre, Gerard Mendes	Boy Gé Mendes	4:17
7.	"Margarita" (featuring Romeo Santos)	Romeo Santos		4:01
8.	"Indy" (featuring Miguel)	Miguel Pimentel		3:26
9.	"Oye 2014" (featuring Pitbull, remastered version of Santana's cover of "Oye Como Va", released in their 1970 album Abraxas)	Ernesto "Tito" Puente, Niles Hollowell-Dhar, Amando Christian Perez	Tito Puente	3:24
10.	"Yo Soy La Luz" (featuring Wayne Shorter & Cindy Blackman)	Carlos Santana		4:06
11.	"I See Your Face"	Bola Sete	Bola Sete	1:19
12.	"Iron Lion Zion" (featuring Ziggy Marley & ChocQuibTown)	Bob Marley	Bob Marley	4:32
Total length:				45:20

Corazón – Latin American deluxe edition bonus tracks
No.	Title	Music	Original artist	Length
13.	"Saideira (Spanish-language version)" (featuring Samuel Rosa)	Samuel Rosa, Rodrigo Leão, Juan Pablo Sorín	Skank	3:55
14.	"Feel It Coming Back" (English-language version of "Amor Correspondido") (featuring Diego Torres)	Rafael Esparza-Ruiz, Yoel Henríquez		4:09
15.	"Besos de Lejos" (Spanish-language version of "Beijo de Longe") (featuring Gloria Estefan)	Teofilo Chantre, Gerard Mendes	Boy Gé Mendes	4:17

== Personnel ==
- Carlos Santana – lead guitar on all tracks except "Una Noche en Nápoles", in which he plays the twelve-string guitar and the classical guitar; percussion (tracks 8, 10, 11); producing and mixing (tracks 10, 11); arranger (tracks 2, 4, 5, 7, 10, 11, 12)

=== Musicians ===
Additional vocalists

- Vicentico – vocals on "Mal Bicho" (track 3)
- Larissa R. Nascimento – background vocals on "Beijo de Longe" (track 14)
- Jovany Javier & Ximena Muñoz – vocal performance on "Oye 2014" (track 4)
- Tommy Anthony, Tony Lindsay and Andy Vargas – vocals on "Yo Soy La Luz" (track 11)

Guitars and bass

- Tommy Anthony – rhythm guitar (all tracks except 3, 8, 9)
- Tim Pierce – rhythm guitar (tracks 1, 2, 4, 5)
- Samuel Rosa – rhythm guitar on "Saideira" (tracks 1, 13)
- Miguel – rhythm guitar on "Indy" (track 9)
- Emily Stefan – additional guitars on "Beijo de Longe" (track 14)
- Benny Rietveld – bass (all tracks except 3, 8, 9)
- Flavio Cianciarulo – bass and rhythm guitar on "Mal Bicho" (track 3)

Keyboards

- David K. Mathews – keyboards (all tracks except 8 and 9)
- Zac Rae – keyboards (all tracks except 6 and 8–11)
- Mario Siperman – keyboards on "La Flaca" (track 2)
- Lester Mendez – keyboard programming on "I See Your Face" (track 12)

Percussion

- Dennis Chambers – drums (tracks 1, 2, 4, 6, 7, 12))
- Fernando Ricciardi – drums on "Mal Bicho" (track 3)
- Cindy Blackman-Santana – drums on "Yo Soy La Luz" (track 11) and "I See Your Face" (track 12)
- Josh Connolly – drum programming on "Mal Bicho" (track 3)
- Karl Perazzo – timbales (all tracks except 8, 9, 11); percussion (tracks 4, 5, 7, 8, 10, 12)
- Raul Rekow – congas (tracks 1, 2, 5, 6, 12)
- Paoli Mijias – congas (tracks 3, 4, 7, 10, 11)
- Laercio da Costa – additional percussion on "Beijo de Longe" (track 14)

Brass

- Jeff Cressman – trombone on "Saideira" (tracks 1 & 13) and "Yo Soy La Luz" (track 11)
- David Stout – trombone and horn arrangement on "Iron Lion Zion" (track 5)
- Bill Ortiz – trumpet on "Saideira" (tracks 1 & 13) and "Yo Soy La Luz" (track 11)
- Daniel Lozano – trumpet on "Mal Bicho" (track 3)
- Harry Kim – trumpet on "Iron Lion Zion" (track 5)
- Sergio Rotman – tenor saxophone on "Mal Bicho" (track 3)
- Dave Pozzi – tenor saxophone on "Iron Lion Zion" (track 5)
- Wayne Shorter – saxophone on "Yo Soy La Luz" (track 11)

Other instruments

- Pedro Alfonso – violin on "Beijo de Longe" (track 14)

=== Technical staff ===
- Chris Gehringer – mastering
- Clive Davis, Carlos Santana, Afo Verde, Michael Vrionis and Tom Corson – executive producers
- Alex Gallardo and Fernando Cabral de Mello – A&R
- La Fábrica de Pepinos de Boa Mistura – album artwork & psychedelia
- Shawn "Tubby" Holiday – A&R (tracks 8 and 9)
- Lourival Rodriguez – Director, Editor and Video producer of the documentary "Santana: The Making of Corazón"
- Ruslan Shakirov – Co-director, Editor, Credits animation and Video producer of the documentary "Santana: The Making of Corazón"

Producing

- Lester Mendez
- Miguel ("Indy") (track 9)
- The Cataracs ("Oye 2014") (track 4)
- Cindy Blackman Santana – co-producer on "Yo Soy La Luz" (track 11)

Mixing

- Tony Maserati
- Manny Marroquin ("Indy") (track 9)
- Justin Hergett – mix engineering (tracks 1, 7, 9)
- James Krausse – mix engineering (tracks 2, 3, 12)
- Matt Wiggers – mix engineering (tracks 4, 5)
- Chris Galland and Delbert Bowers – assistant mixers on "Indy" (track 9)

Engineering

- Bill Malina – recording engineer
- Jim Reitzel – guitar engineer (all tracks except 7–10); recording engineer (tracks 6, 8, 9, 10, 11); mixer and mixing engineer (tracks 10, 11)
- Josh Connolly – assistant engineer at Odd On Studios
- Dave Diffin – assistant engineer at Odd on studios (tracks 1 and 3)
- Scott Moore – assistant engineer at Ocean Way Recording on "Iron Lion Zion" (track 5)

"Beijo de Longe"/"Besos de Lejos" (track 14)

- Emilio Estefan – producer
- Javier Conde Alonso – arranger
- Eric Schilling – mixer
- Tuco Barini – recording engineer (percussion in Brazil)
- Dave Poler – vocal engineering
- Izzy Maccio and Jimmy Sanchez – assistant engineers
- Ron Taylor and Danny Ponce – additional engineering
- Kurt Berge – technical support
- José Maldonado – production manager

== Charts ==
=== Weekly charts ===
Chart (2014)	Peak position
Australian Albums (ARIA)	67
Austrian Albums (Ö3 Austria)	5
Belgian Albums (Ultratop Flanders)	101
Belgian Albums (Ultratop Wallonia)	42
Danish Albums (Hitlisten)	12
Dutch Albums (Album Top 100)	36
Finnish Albums (Suomen virallinen lista)	20
French Albums (SNEP)	96
German Albums (Offizielle Top 100)	12
Hungarian Albums (MAHASZ)	11
Italian Albums (FIMI)	13
Japanese Albums (Oricon)	26
Polish Albums (ZPAV)	10
Portuguese Albums (AFP)	26
Scottish Albums (Official Charts)	73
Spanish Albums (Promusicae)	39
Swiss Albums (Schweizer Hitparade)	14
UK Albums (Official Charts)	58
US Billboard 200	9
US Top Latin Albums (Billboard)	1
US Latin Pop Albums (Billboard)	1
US Top Rock Albums (Billboard)	1

=== Year-end charts ===
Chart (2014)	Position
US Top Latin Albums (Billboard)	5
US Top Rock Albums (Billboard)	65

== Certifications ==
Region	Certification	Certified units/sales
Mexico (AMPROFON) Deluxe Edition	Gold	30,000^{^}
United States (RIAA)	2× Platinum (Latin)	95,000
^{^} Shipments figures based on certification alone.
