= Ella Es Mi Fiesta =

Single by Carlos Vives

from the album Más + Corazón Profundo
- Released: October 21, 2014
- Genre: Tropipop
- Length: 4:06
- Label: Sony Music Latin
- Songwriters: Carlos Vives; Andrés Castro

Carlos Vives singles chronology
"Cuando Nos Volvamos a Encontrar" (2014)	"Ella Es Mi Fiesta" (2014)	"Dame una Sonrisa" (2015)

"Ella Es Mi Fiesta" ("She's My Party") is a song by Colombian recording artist Carlos Vives. It was released by Sony Music Latin as the third single for his fourteenth studio album Más + Corazón Profundo (2014) in October 21, 2014, and the lead single from his upcoming live album.

== Charts ==
Chart (2014)	Peak position
Colombia (National-Report)	1
Dominican Republic Pop Chart (Monitor Latino)	16
US Latin Airplay (Billboard)	36
US Latin Pop Airplay (Billboard)	20
US Tropical Airplay (Billboard)	21
Venezuela (Record Report)	2

== Certifications ==
Region	Certification	Certified units/sales
United States (RIAA)	4× Platinum (Latin)	240,000^{‡}
^{‡} Sales+streaming figures based on certification alone.
