= Hasta el Techo =

Single by ChocQuibTown

from the album Eso Es Lo Que Hay
- Released: September 30, 2011
- Genre: Hip hop, Down-tempo
- Length: 3:52
- Label: Sony Music
- Songwriters: Andrés Castro, Carlos Valencia, Gloria Martínez, Miguel Martínez

ChocQuibTown singles chronology
"Calentura" (2011)	"Hasta el Techo" (2011)	"Uh La La" (2013)

"Hasta el Techo" (English: To the Roof) is a Hip hop song by Colombian group ChocQuibTown. It was released as the second single from their third studio album Eso Es Lo Que Hay (2011).

== Background and composition ==
Following the success with their song "De Donde Vengo Yo" in the Latin Grammys they signed with Sony Music Colombia to support their next album Eso Es Lo Que Hay. "Hasta el Techo was released as the second single from the album. The song has described like a "very beautiful experiment" where played the intention to looking for some down-tempo according to Tostao in a promotional video. The song was written by Gloría Martinez (Goyo), Carlos Valencia (Tostao), Miguel Martinez (Slow) and Andrés Castro, and produced by Andrés Castro and Slow.

== Track listing ==
- Album version
1. "Hasta el Techo" - 13:52

== Charts ==
Chart (2012)	Peak position
Colombia (National-Report)	7
