= Cuando Te Veo =

Single by ChocQuibTown

from the album El Mismo
- Released: May 27, 2015
- Genre: Hip hop, Down-tempo
- Length: 3:52
- Label: Sony Music
- Songwriters: Andrés Castro, Carlos Valencia, Gloria Martínez, Miguel Martínez

ChocQuibTown singles chronology
"Calentura" (2011)	"Cuando Te Veo" (2015)	"Uh La La" (2013)

"Cuando Te Veo" is a 2015 single by the Colombian hip-hop group ChocQuibTown. It was remixed featuring Puerto Rican reggaeton singer Nicky Jam. The single reached number 13 on the Billboard US Tropical Songs chart, number 16 on the Billboard Latin Rhythm Airplay chart, and number 29 on the Billboard US Latin Pop chart. Leila Cobo of Billboard noted reggae influences in the song.
