= Soledad Pastorutti =

Argentine folk singer

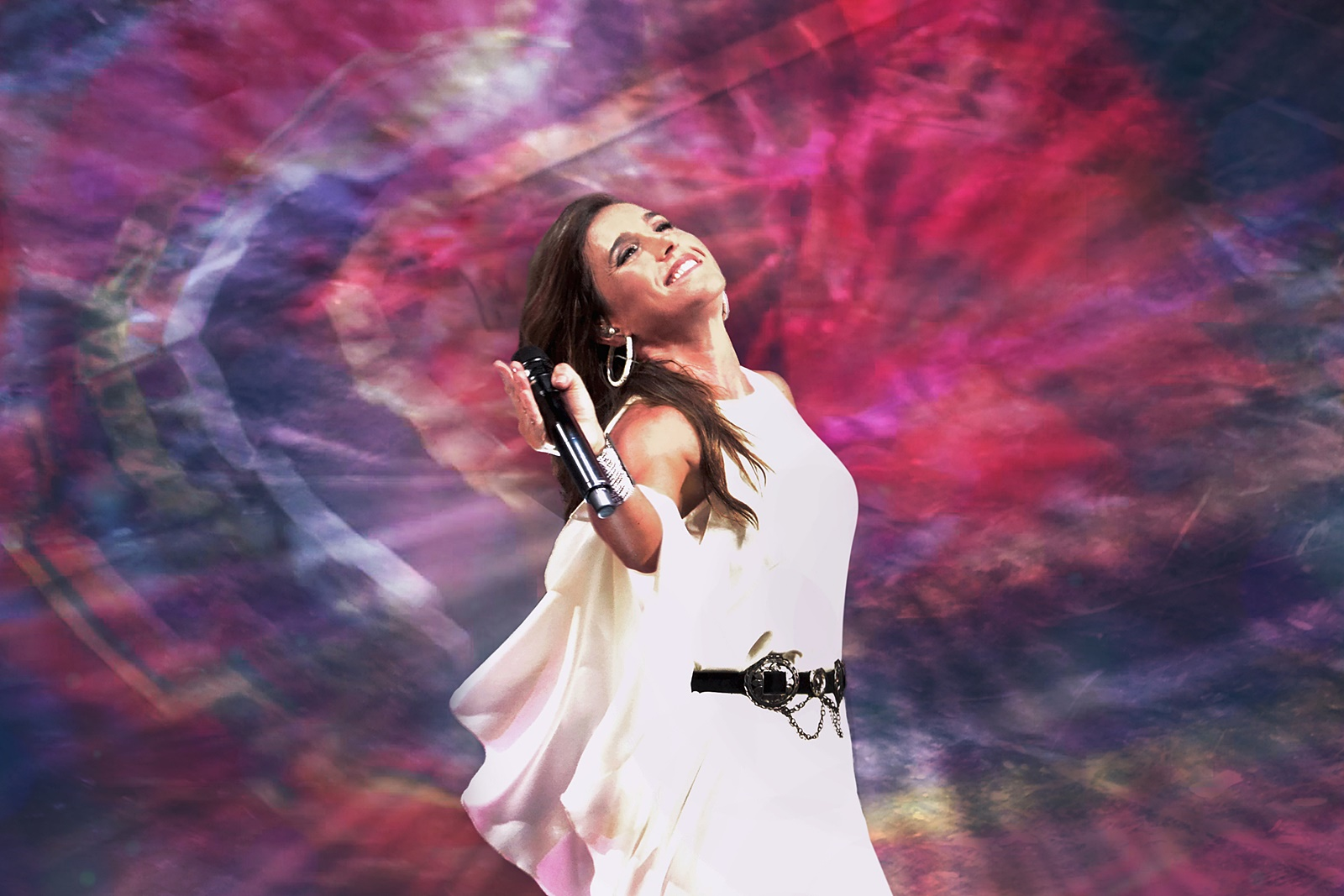
- Pastorutti performing in 2018
- Born: October 12, 1980 (age 46); Arequito, Argentina
- Occupations: Singer; songwriter; actress; businesswoman
- Years active: 1995–present
- Spouse: Jeremías Audoglio (m. 2007)
- Children: 2
- Musical career
- Genres: Folk; Latin pop
- Instruments: Vocals; guitar
- Label: Sony Music Latin
- Website: www.lasole.net

Signature
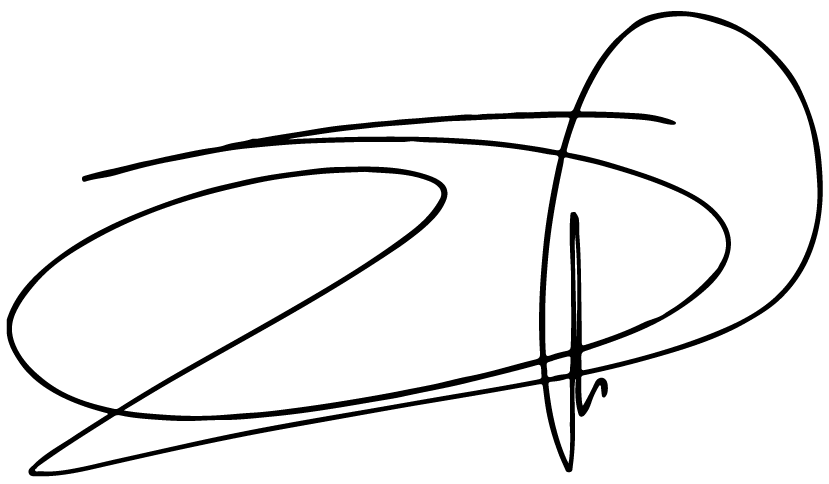

Soledad "La Sole" Pastorutti (born October 12, 1980) is an Argentine folk singer, who brought the genre to the younger generations at the end of the 20th century, and the beginning of the 21st. She is also a film and TV actress.

Her first album, Poncho al Viento, is Sony Music's best-selling album ever in Argentina according to Alberto Caldero, Sony Music's president in the late 1990s, in an interview with La Nación newspaper.

== Career ==
In 1995, when Pastorutti was 15 years old, César Isella took her under his tutelage to participate in the Cosquín folklore festival. Her performance with her sister Natalia landed her a contract with Sony Music Argentina to record and release her first album, Poncho al Viento, that very same year. After one year singing in over 181 villages and cities in Argentina, Soledad was already popular in the whole country. By the time her second album was released, her first album became a huge hit in Argentina. She was so incredibly successful and popular that the media called her 'Huracán de Arequito' (Arequito's Hurricane).

In 1997 she recorded her second album, La Sole, which she also presented in several concerts throughout the country, including 10 concerts in Buenos Aires' Teatro Gran Rex. During the year, both of her albums went to No. 1 several times.

In 1998 her success kept growing. She performed more concerts at the Teatro Gran Rex, and accompanied the Argentina national football team for the 1998 FIFA World Cup. In Madrid, Spain, she received a distinction from Sony International for selling a million units of her first two works.

Upon her return, Sony Music Argentina recognised her as the best seller artist of the company in all the musical genres, and edited her third album A mi gente, recorded live during her concerts. For the first time, folkloric music was getting huge airplay in radios and discos.

In 1999 she became the protagonist of the movie Edad del Sol ("age of the Sun", also an anagram of her name), and recorded her fourth album, Yo sí Quiero a mi país ("I love my country"), this time in studios in Miami under the production of Cuban musician (and husband of Gloria Estefan) Emilio Estefan. The album opened doors to other markets in, among others, Bolivia, Uruguay, Paraguay, Chile, Peru, Mexico, the United States and Spain, in which she would embark on tour.

Edad del Sol was a huge production for Argentina's cinema standard, and Clarin reported Soledad asked for three times more than an "A-list" Argentine actor asks for a movie. The movie, about a graduation trip, was shot in Bariloche. The movie was not as successful as expected, with Manuelita (an animated film based on a popular children's song) overshadowing and outperforming at the box office. The cartoon stole the film's spotlight, and was the biggest film in Argentina of the last 20 years. Furthermore, "Edad" was not well-received or widely praised by critics.

In 2000, after an absence of two years, Soledad returned to Buenos Aires for three concerts at the iconic Luna Park. In August, she participated in the Martigues Folklore Festival, in France, where she was met with critical acclaim. Back in Argentina, she started recording her fifth album, released in October of that year. Before the release of La Sole, she performed at the Barbican Centre of London during a festival of Argentine cinema and music. Soledad also participated of the 2000 Viña del Mar International Song Festival in Chile, considered the most important recurring music festival in Latin America, where she received the Audience prize.

Her sixth album was recorded in 2001, produced by Alejandro Lerner and Fernando Isella, with a renovated style. She had again concerts at the Gran Rex, and received the "Silver Torch" award at the Viña del Mar Festival. Soledad debuted on TV in the telenovela (soap opera) Rincón de Luz in 2003.

Soledad was also announced as one of the vocal coaches for the Argentine version of the reality singing competition The Voice and, in recent years, served as a judge on Telefe's version of the singing competition program Rising Star. Since 2008, she has hosted the popular music program Ecos de mi tierra ("echoes of my land").

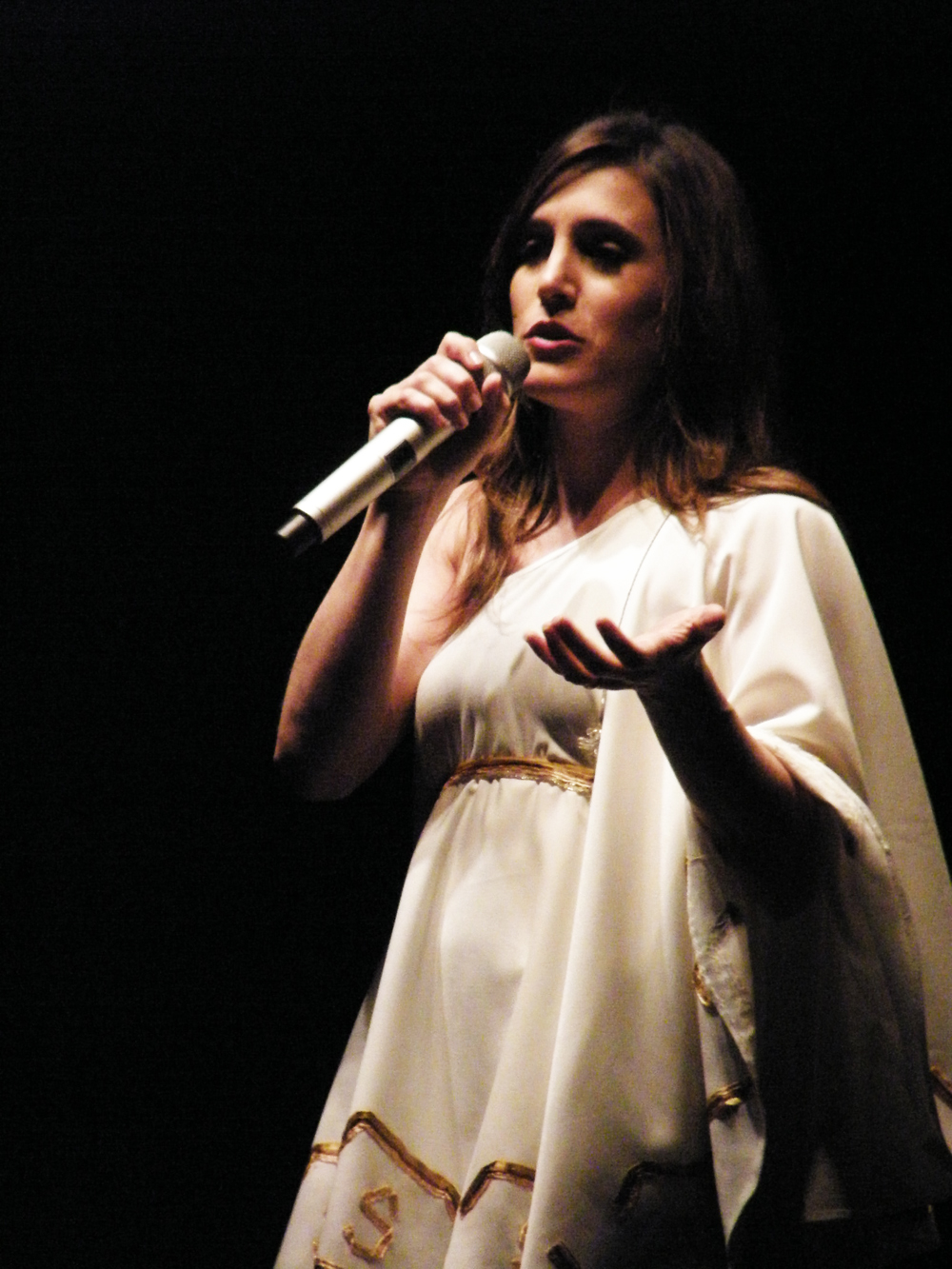
Pastorutti in Santa Fe, 2010

Soledad has done over 2,000 different shows, many outside of Argentina, including her performances at the Martigues Folklore Festival in France; the Barbican Centre, London, England, during a festival of Argentine cinema and music; and performing for over 20,000 people at the Viña del Mar International Song Festival, in Valparaíso, Chile (where she received the Audience Prize and the Silver Torch Award), which is widely considered the most important recurring music festival in Latin America. Each year, usually in March, the iconic "Viña del Mar" (as it is known) festival showcases South American, Latin American and international musicians; the artists and styles are highly varied, from Chilean classical and folk musicians to South American superstars such as Karol G, Maluma, María José Quintanilla, Shakira and Tini, as well as international megastars like the Backstreet Boys, Becky G, Christina Aguilera, Daddy Yankee and Ivy Queen.

Soledad has released 16 albums, including acoustic, studio and live recordings, and has been nominated for several Latin Grammy Awards. She has recorded duets and features with top international artists, including Alejandro Sanz, Carlos Santana, Carlos Vives, Franco de Vita, Joan Manuel Serrat, Juanes, Lila Downs and Niña Pastori.

In July 2013, she performed for Pope Francis at World Youth Day, closing the event in Rio de Janeiro, the televised performance being played to more than three million people.

In 2014, Soledad took part in the album Raíz ("root"), a collaborative album with Mexican singer Lila Downs (hailing from Oaxaca) and Spanish flamenco artist Niña Pastori, and received a nomination for a Grammy Award for Best Latin Pop Album and the Latin Grammy Award for Album of the Year, winning the Latin Grammy for Best Folk Album. The trio also collaborated with Santana on the track Una Noche en Nápoles for the 2014 album Corazón.

In 2015, Soledad released a new album, Vivir es hoy ("to live is today"). Her first single, "Dame una sonrisa" ("give me a smile") featured Carlos Vives. Soledad embarked on a new tour in several cities across Argentina, Chile, and Uruguay, including three sold-out shows in the Teatro Opera in Buenos Aires.

In 2016, Soledad reached a milestone, celebrating 20 years of her musical career with a show at the mythical Cosquín Festival, where many of the most important artists from Argentina joined her on stage for an incredible performance.

In April, she was the only Argentine artist invited to the Billboard Latin Conference & Awards, as a part of the "Divas" panel; later, she was invited to give a show at the Fillmore Miami Beach at the Jackie Gleason Theater. She returned to Santiago, Chile just in time to sell out shows at the Teatro Nescafe and the Dreams in Viña del Mar. In June, her career reached a new milestone when she was contracted by the American cable network ABC to sing "Don't Cry for Me Argentina" in one of their most popular reality shows, "The Bachelorette"

When she returned to Argentina, Soledad released a CD/DVD set, "20 años" (20 years), which coincided with the beginning of a tour of Argentina and internationally, complete with an enormous stage show that sold out Estadio Luna Park and other major cities in Argentina, and had great success at 30 shows in 7 countries (Uruguay, Chile, Bolivia, Ecuador, the United States, Canada and Spain).

== Personal life ==
Soledad Pastorutti is the older sister of singer Natalia Pastorutti.

She married Jeremías Audoglio on April 28, 2007 in Arequito. The couple have two daughters.

== Discography ==
- 1994 – Pilchas gauchas
- 1996 – Poncho al viento
- 1997 – La Sole
- 1998 – A mi gente (Live)
- 1999 – Yo sí quiero a mi país
- 2000 – Mis grandes canciones
- 2000 – Soledad
- 2001 – Libre
- 2002 – Juntos por única vez (Live with Horacio Guarany)
- 2003 – Adonde vayas
- 2005 – Diez años de Soledad
- 2008 – Folklore
- 2009 – La Fiesta: Juntos de verdad (Live)
- 2010 – Vivo en Arequito
- 2014 – Raíz (with Niña Pastori and Lila Downs)
- 2015 – Vivir es hoy
- 2016 – 20 años
- 2020 – Parte de mí
- 2023 – Natural
