= Elefantes =

"Elefantes" (Spanish for "Elephants") is a popular Hispanic children's song similar to the American song "99 Bottles of Beer".

== In American education ==
Many students in Spanish I and II classes learn this song to help with their vocabulary and grammar. In Spanish I, the counting part of the song may help. In the case of the words veía, araña, and resistía, the tildes (accent marks) help the students with their accents and how to pronounce the words when they are present. The verbs ir and caber are irregular in the preterite tense, so the teacher may tell the students to sing the song as if it happened last week. Many young ESL students, or even grown immigrants, learn the song to help with their English.

== In popular culture ==
There is a popular commercial shown on Latin American television (primarily Telemundo) for the Ford Focus that shows some men dressed in elephant suits in the car singing the song. When they arrive at a party, they realize that the invitation said elegante and not elefante.

== See also ==
- Nursery rhyme
