= Raíz (album) =

Studio album by Lila Downs, Niña Pastori, Soledad Pastorutti
- Released: April 1, 2014
- Recorded: 2012–2014
- Genre: Pop, world music, traditional, folk, ranchera
- Length: 91:00
- Language: Spanish
- Label: RCA Records/Sony Music
- Producer: Aneiro Taño, Julio Jiménez

Raíz (transl. Origin) is a collaborative studio album by singers Lila Downs, Niña Pastori and Soledad Pastorutti; released on April 1, 2014, by RCA Records. The album's first single, "La raíz de mi tierra", was released on February 25, 2014, on VEVO.

Raíz received two nominations at the 2014 Latin Grammys: Album of the Year and Best Folk Album, which it won. It was also nominated at the Grammy Awards 2015 in the category Best Latin Pop Album.

== Track listing ==
1. "La raíz de mi tierra"
2. "Que nadie sepa mi sufrir"
3. "Chacarera para mi vuelta"
4. "La maza"
5. "El día que me quieras"
6. "Cumbia del mole"
7. "Agua de rosas"
8. "Sodade"
9. "Puede ser"
10. "Zapata se queda"
11. "Tren del cielo"
12. "Válgame Dios"
13. "Y para qué"
14. "Cómo será"
15. "Dime quien soy yo"
16. "Tierra de luz"

== Certifications ==
Certifications for Raíz
Region	Certification	Certified units/sales
Mexico (AMPROFON)	Gold	30,000^{‡}
^{‡} Sales+streaming figures based on certification alone.
