= Niña Pastori =

Spanish flamenco rock singer

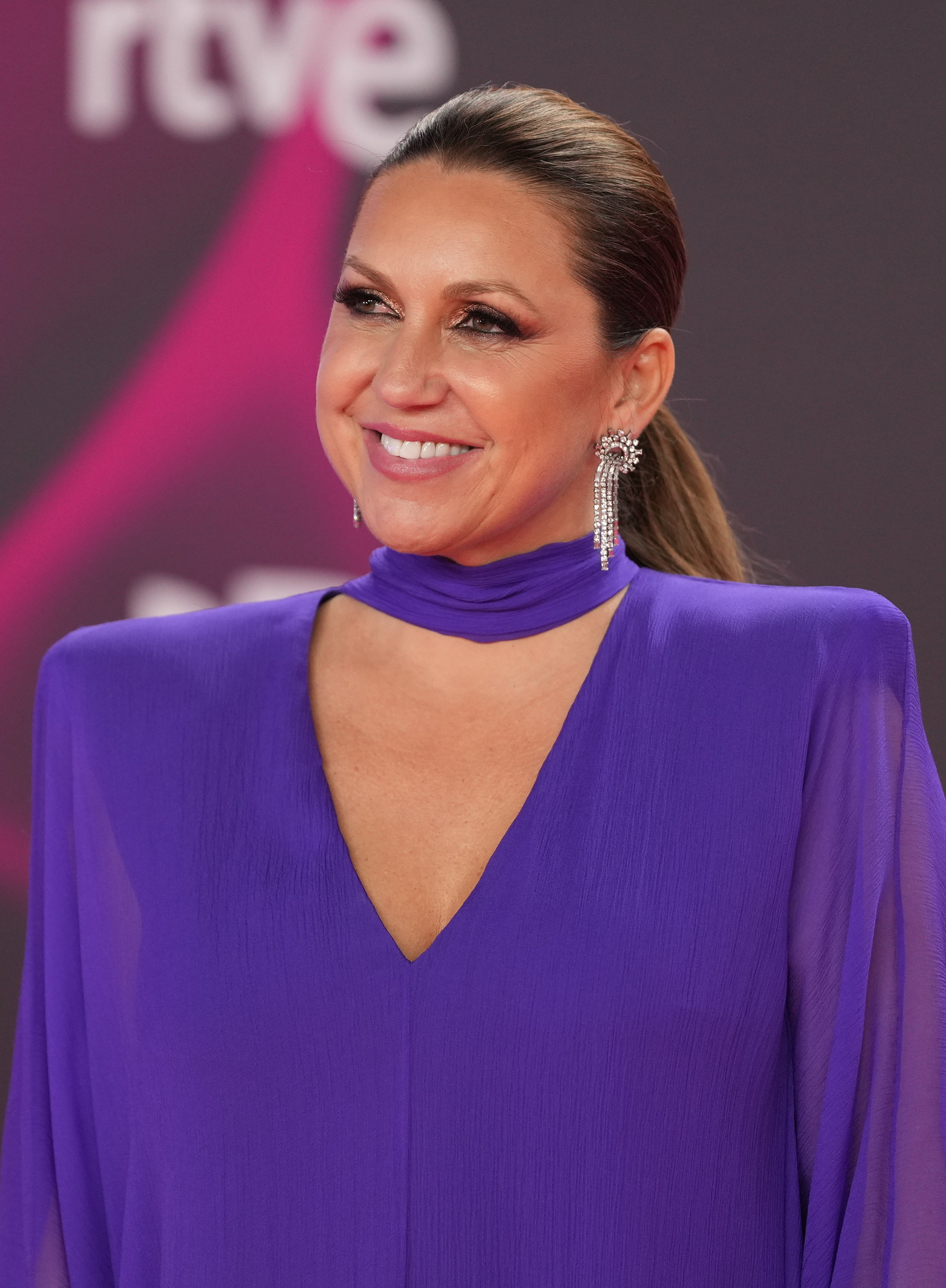
- Pastori in 2023

Background information
- Born: María Rosa García García; 15 January 1978 (age 48); San Fernando (Cádiz), Spain
- Genres: Flamenco, pop rock
- Occupation: Singer
- Website: www.ninapastori.es

María Rosa García García (born 15 January 1978 in San Fernando, Cádiz), better known as Niña Pastori, is a Spanish flamenco singer (cantaora).

== Biography ==
María Rosa García was born in 1978 in the town of San Fernando in Cádiz. The youngest of five siblings and the only daughter of a military man (José García) and flamenco singer "La Pastori" García.

Her stage name is "Niña Pastori" because among her five older brothers, she was the only woman, and she was referred to as "la niña"; she was also "la única hija de la Pastori" (the only daughter of la Pastori), and when she went on stage, people remarked, “va a cantar la niña de la Pastori” (la Pastori's girl is going to sing). Her initial name was "La niña de la Pastori", but she later changed it to "Niña Pastori".

She went to junior school at the Vicente Tofiño school in San Fernando (Cádiz).

She started her artistic career at a young age singing in Andalusia. At the age of six, she accompanied her mother in the flamenco tablaos of "Barrio de la Pastora", and a year later won a singing contest at the "El Chato" club in San Fernando, where she sang bulerías (a flamenco style) and won first prize. Following this performance, she gained recognition for her vocal ability at a young age.

Among her first mentors was Camarón de la Isla, also from San Fernando (Cádiz), whose purist flamenco style she followed in her early years. Later she added a more commercial, pop tone to her image and style without losing her flamenco roots. Artists Paco Ortega and Alejandro Sanz helped her produce her first album, Entre dos puertos, when she was seventeen and with whom she sold more than 150,000 units, achieving commercial popularity. Part of this was due to the single Tú me camelas, which was a hit in Spain in summer 1996. Since then, she has recorded ten albums and has sold two million records.

Her second album, Eres luz (1998) confirmed her success, with songs again by Paco Ortega and Alejandro Sanz, Parrita, Manuel Malou and her brother Paco. In 2000, she published her third album, Cañaílla, produced by Alejandro Sanz and Josemi Carmona of the flamenco group Ketama; it is dedicated to her home town and more flamenco than the previous works. Her album María (2002) evolved to a more personal style, taking part in the lyrics and composition of some of her songs, a trend that she continued in No hay quinto malo, her fifth album (2004).

In Joyas prestadas (2006), where Niña Pastori makes personal versions of songs originally by artists from very different styles and genres, such as boleros, ballads, coplas and classics from Spain and Latin America. The original artists include Joan Manuel Serrat, Alejandro Sanz, Mexican rockers Maná, Dominican artist Juan Luis Guerra, Antonio Machín, Manolo García of El Último de la Fila, Luz Casal, Armando Manzanero, Los Jeros or Marifé de Triana. This project had a second part ten years later, Ámame como soy (nuevas joyas).

She has received many awards. Some of the most important ones include four Latin Grammys (three as the best flamenco music album and one as the best folk album), as well as Gold and Platinum records in Spain and other countries such as Colombia and Argentina, as she has gone beyond Spanish borders and has toured Latin America and Europe with great success. She is the only flamenco artist nominated for the Grammy for Best Latin Pop Album and has won two Premios Dial awards and a few other Premios Amigo awards.

In 2014, Soledad released Raíz, a collaborative album featuring Mexican singer Lila Downs and Niña Pastori, and received a nomination for a Grammy Award for Best Latin Pop Album and the Latin Grammy Award for Album of the Year, winning the Latin Grammy for Best Folk Album. The trio also collaborated with Santana on the track Una Noche en Nápoles for the 2014 album Corazón.

In 2018, she was awarded the Medalla de Andalucía, where she performed the Andalusian hymn. She also received the Honorary Award for her National and International Career at the Premios Flamenco En La Piel awards at the International Salon of Flamenco Fashion (SIMOF) 2018.

She sang a version of Schubert's Ave Maria during Pope John Paul II's last visit to Madrid in May 2003 for 3 million people. Later, this version was included in a new edition of her album María released in 2006.

One of her hits, "Cai", was a song composed by Alejandro Sanz that is dedicated to the city of Cádiz.

She participated as a special guest in the event in which Alejandro Sanz celebrated the 20th anniversary of his album "Más".

She is married to Julio Jiménez Borja "Chaboli", co-producer, composer and percussionist on her albums. She is the great-granddaughter of flamenco singer Inés "la del Pelao".

On May 7, 2018, Niña Pastori talked to the `20 minutos` magazine about her new work "Bajo tus alas" and her current career. In an interview with 20 Minutos, Pastori discussed her perspective on ageing, female empowerment, and the importance of silence in her creative process. She stated that she is open regarding her private life and credits her relationship with her audience to her perceived natural style. "I love when they tell me that they love me because I am very natural. I love when I'm stopped by women on the street and they say: "You seem so normal, you are just like us". I have a life like everyone else, through good times and bad times I have suffered." In addition, she assures that being happy all the time is not good; if she has bad moments, she does not hide it to her fans; at times she'd a tear on stage. With this interview, Pastori showed her most personal and human side, ensuring that what makes her the happiest is singing, especially singing about what she loves.

== Discography ==
-Entre dos puertos. 1996

Produced by Paco Ortega and Alejandro Sanz, it was her first studio album, which she recorded aged just 17. The album went platinum (150,000 copies sold), and her single "Tú me camelas" managed to be among the top of the music charts for months. As for its content, the album offers a mix of pop along with rumbas, fandangos, bulerías and tanguillos.

-Eres Luz. 1998

Eres Luz is the second studio album by Niña Pastori, produced by Paco Ortega and Alejandro Sanz, published by Sony BMG, and recorded and released in 1998. The album includes songs with Alejandro Sanz, Parrita, Paco Ortega and her brother, Paco. This album offers a fresh touch of flamenco.

-Canaílla. 2000

It is her record of consecration and was produced by Alejandro Sanz. It offers collaborations with various artists such as José Miguel and Antonio Carmona, Vicente Amigo, Moraito, etc. It is a disc of varied content, catering to all audiences.

-María. 2002

This album was again designed and planned by Niña Pastori and her partner Julio Jiménez Borja, alias Chaboli. Thus, the latter was the one that produced all the songs on the album except two, "Amor de San Juan" and "De boca en boca", which were produced by his author, José Manuel Ruiz, known as Queco.

-No hay quinto malo. 2004

“No hay quinto malo” is the fifth album of Niña Pastori. It offers both CD and DVD versions, and was shot by director Juan Estelrich. Niña Pastori participated in the composition of all the songs of this album along with her husband, Chaboli, and Jeros. It is her riskiest album, but also the purest and most intimate.

-Joyas prestadas. 2006

On this album, the artist covers her favourite songs for the first time, which are special for her and have helped her in her life. It includes songs by Joan Manuel Serrat, Alejandro Sanz, Maná, Juan Luis Guerra, Antonio Machín, Manolo García, Luz Casal, Armando Manzanero and Marifé de Triana.

-Esperando verte. 2009

She recorded it together with her husband, Chaboli, whilst being pregnant with her first daughter, to which she refers in many of her songs. The album includes very varied styles from tangos to bulerías and fandangos.

The title track of the album, "Esperando verte", is a song dedicated entirely to her daughter. Thus, this album is considered for her as one of the most special due to her pregnancy.

-La orilla de mi pelo. 2011

This album won the Latin Grammy for the Best Flamenco Album. In this album, pop predominates over flamenco. Thus, there is a change in the accompaniment of her songs, leaving aside the flamenco guitar and replacing it with the acoustic and electric guitar.

Pastori described the themes of the album as centring on passion, romance, and artistic purity.

-Raíz. 2014.

On this album, Pastori worked with the Mexican singer-songwriter Lila Downs and the Argentinian folk singer Soledad Pastorutti. The album was produced by Aneiro Taño and J. Jiménez, also known as "Chaboli." Through their songs, they share particular features of their folklore and their nations.

-Ámame como soy. 2015

This repertory arose from the collaborations of Niña Pastori with Ruben Blades, Juan Luis Guerra, Pancho Céspedes and Sara Baras for the first time.

-Bajo tus alas. 2018

This album was produced by Chaboli and mixed in Los Angeles by Rafa Sardina. In `Bajo tus alas`, Niña Pastori offers songs accompanied by great musical artists such as Manuel Carrasco, Guaco, Vanesa Martín and Pablo Alborán.

It's another step in her personal style, which is influenced by flamenco, and the album also highlights the depth of her voice.

The starting point of her presentation tour of Bajo tus Alas was in Campanario.

== Collaborations ==
- La Roja Baila: Sergio Ramos, RedOne.
- Entre dos puertos: Antonio Reyes (bailaor); Ricardo Miño, Moraíto Chico, Juan Manuel Cañizares, Rafael Riqueni and Ramón Trujillo (guitarrista).
- Eres luz: Moraíto, Juan Carlos Romero, Machuka, Alejandro Sanz, José Antonio Rodríguez and Juan Manuel Cañizares (guitarists); Manuel Soler, El Bandolero and Chaboli (percussionista).
- Cañaílla: Guadiana (cantaor), Antonio Carmona (cantador); José Miguel Carmona, Diego Carrasco, Diego del Morao, Moraíto Chico and Vicente Amigo (guitarista); Alejandro Sanz (compositante); El Bandolero and Chaboli (percussionista).
- María: Farruquito (bailaor); José Carlos Gómez, Moraíto Chico, Diego del Morao and José Antonio Rodríguez (guitarists); El Bandolero, Chaboli and Tino di Geraldo (percussionists).
- No hay quinto malo: Paquete, Diego del Morao, Juan Carmona and José Miguel Carmona (guitarists); Luis Dulzaides, Tino di Geraldo and Chaboli (percussionists); Carles Benavent (bass); Victor Merlo (double bass).
- Joyas prestadas: José Miguel Carmona and Diego Moreno (guitarists); Chaboli and Angie Bao (percussionist); Antonio Serrano (harmonica); Nacho Mañó and Antonio Ramos "Maca" (bass); José María Cortina and Santi Navalón (keyboards).
- Raíz: Lila Downs and Soledad Pastorutti.
