= Marifé de Triana =

The Most Excellent Marifé de Triana
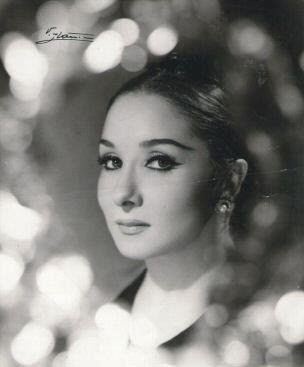

Background information
- Also known as: The Empress of Copla; Actress of Copla
- Born: María Felisa Martínez López; 13 September 1936; Burguillos, Spain
- Died: 16 February 2013 (aged 76) Benalmádena, Spain
- Genres: Copla
- Occupations: Singer, actress
- Instrument: Voice
- Years active: 1955–2001; 2002–2011
- Label: Columbia Graphophone Company
- Spouse: José María Alonso Calvo (1926–2008)

María Felisa Martínez López (September 13, 1936 – February 16, 2013), known professionally as Marifé de Triana, was a Spanish singer, dancer and actress.

== Early life ==
Marifé de Triana was born in Burguillos in Seville. She lived in the neighborhood of Triana, leading to her nickname.

== Career ==
At age 20, she finished works of copla and was featured in films between 1957 and 1958, 1959 with Canto para ti. She was a pioneer film star in folklore films doing work that later was copied by other singers. In the 1960s she performed many festivals in much success in the theaters of Madrid, Lara, Princess Beatrice, Princess Elizabeth, Cervantes, Seville, Barcelona and all of Spain.

During the first half of the twentieth century, she mainly worked in theater, on lyrical spectacles alongside Spanish singers such as El Príncipe Gitano, Juana Reina, Pepe Mairena and La niña de los Peines. She starred in Spanish and some European co-productions. She worked actors including Carmen Sevilla, Ángel de Andrés, Tony Leblanc, Manuel Alexandre and Conrado San Martín.

She recorded with Columbia Gramophone UK from 1958 to 1978. She was a singer well known for her drama, while singing songs known as the sand tower, The Death of Queen Mercedes and other songs of her repertoire also known.

During the 1990s she presented the radio program Lo que yo más quiero, on Canal Sur 2 Radio. On July 24, 2009, a tribute event was held, consisting of a play in the street in Triana and a Copla Contest that bore her name. She premiered a song called "Ay, Marifé". It was interpreted by Sevillian singer Cristina Crespo and composed by Francisco Miguel Alegre, Juan Eduardo Peso and David Díaz.

== Personal life ==
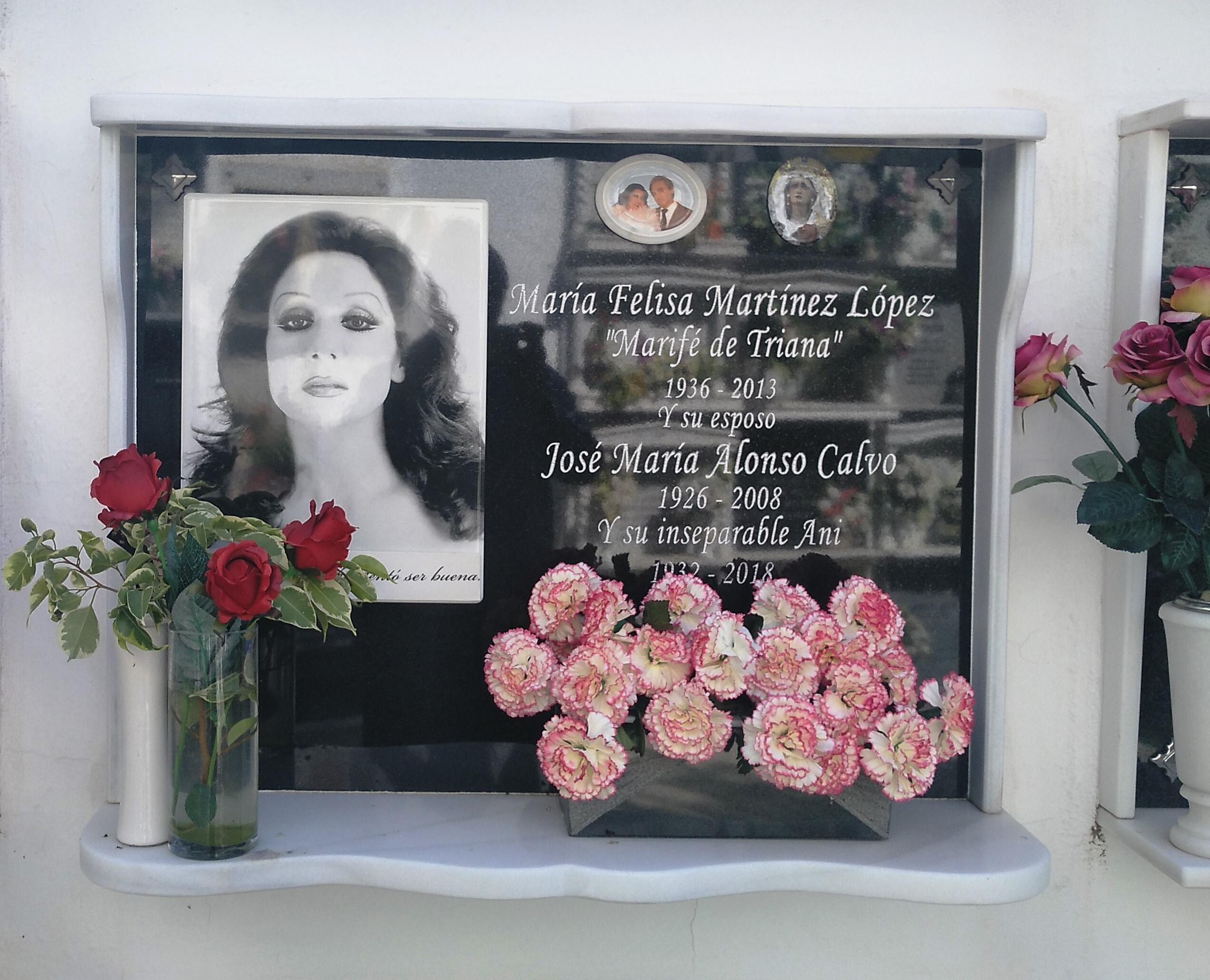
Initial tomb of Marifé de Triana, cemetery of Torremolinos, Málaga.

In 1970 she retired from film due to her husband's illness. Her husband José María died on April 26, 2008, at age 85. On November 11, 2011, she was awarded the Gold Medal for Meritorious Work. She died on February 16, 2013. She is buried in the Municipal Cemetery of Torremolinos, next to her husband.

== Honors ==
- 2011 – Gold Medal of Merit in Labour (Kingdom of Spain, 14 November 2011).
