= El Mar de Sus Ojos =

Single by Carlos Vives featuring ChocQuibTown

from the album Más + Corazón Profundo
- Released: March 3, 2014
- Genre: Latin pop, Hip hop
- Length: 3:52
- Label: Sony Music Latin
- Songwriters: Carlos Vives; Hugo Huertas

Carlos Vives singles chronology
"La Foto de los Dos" (2013)	"El Mar de Sus Ojos" (2014)	"La Copa de Todos" (2014)

ChocQuibTown singles chronology
"Uh La La" (2013)	"El Mar de Sus Ojos" (2014)	"Cuando Te Veo" (2015)

"El Mar de Sus Ojos" (transl. "The Sea Of Her Eyes") is a song performed by Colombian recording artist Carlos Vives featuring the hip-hop group ChocQuibTown. It is the lead single from his album Más + Corazón Profundo (2014). At the Latin Grammy Awards of 2014, the song received a nomination for Record of the Year.

== Chart performance ==
"El Mar de Sus Ojos", in Colombia debuted at number one on the National-Report chart on the week March 3, 2014, replacing "El Serrucho" by Mr Black. In the United States the song debuted at number eleven on the Billboard Hot Latin Songs chart, logged 11.8 million audience detections in its opening week, according to Nielsen SoundScan. On the Billboard Latin Pop Songs chart, debuted at number fifteen and on the Billboard Tropical Songs at number nine, in both charts the song won the "Greatest Gainer", title that is given to records that have greatest airplay and sales that week.

== Track listing ==
- Digital download
1. "El Mar de Sus Ojos" – 3:52

== Credits and personnel ==
Credits adapted from the "El Mar de Sus Ojos" liner notes.

Recording

- Recorded at Henson Recording Studios, Los Angeles, USA and The Groove Studios, Miami, USA.

Personnel

- Songwriting – Carlos Vives and Hugo Huertas
- Music director – Hugo Huertas
- Featured artists – ChocQuibTown
- Production – Carlos Vives and Andrés Castro
- Arrangement – Carlos Vives, Andrés Castro and Miguel Martínez "Mike"
- Programming – Andrés Castrp and Miguel Martínez "Mike"
- Mastering – Tom Coyne
- Mixing – Curt Schneider

== Charts ==
=== Weekly charts ===
Chart (2014)	Peak position
Colombia (National-Report)	1
Dominican Republic Pop Chart (Monitor Latino)	9
US Hot Latin Songs (Billboard)	11
US Latin Airplay (Billboard)	1
US Latin Pop Airplay (Billboard)	15
US Tropical Airplay (Billboard)	2
Venezuela (Record Report)	1

=== Year-end charts ===
Chart (2014)	Position
US Latin Songs	90
US Latin Tropical Airplay	32

== Certifications ==
Region	Certification	Certified units/sales
United States (RIAA)	2× Platinum (Latin)	120,000^{‡}
^{‡} Sales+streaming figures based on certification alone.

== See also ==
- List of Billboard number-one Latin songs of 2014
