= ChocQuibTown =

Colombian musical group

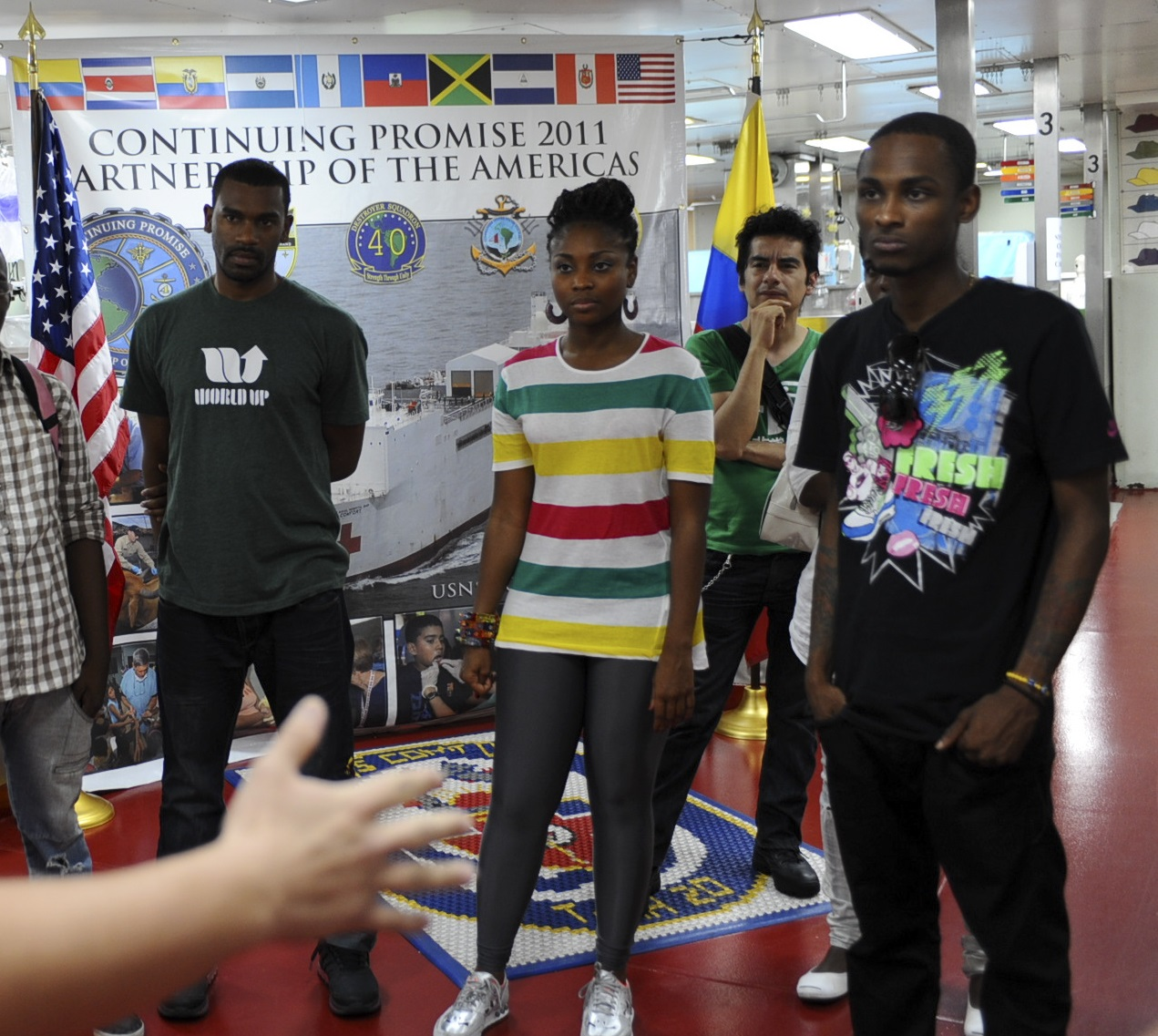
- ChocQuibTown in 2011 at the US Navy Sealift Command Hospital during Continuing Promise 2011, a Caribbean humanitarian mission.

Background information
- Origin: Chocó, Colombia
- Genres: Hip hop, salsa, Latin jazz
- Years active: 2000–present
- Labels: Nacional Records; Sony Music
- Members: Carlos "Tostao" Valencia; Gloria "Goyo" Martínez; Miguel "Slow" Martínez
- Website: www.chocquibtown.com

ChocQuibTown (sometimes written as Choc Quib Town) is a Colombian hip-hop group that fuses various musical genres. Although the band formed in Cali, the members are originally from the Colombian department of Chocó. The group consists of Carlos "Tostao" Valencia (rapping), Gloria "Goyo" Martínez (singing and rapping), and Miguel "Slow" Martínez (production and rapping). The band's music draws influence from a wide variety of modern genres including hip-hop and more recently electronica, combined with traditional Colombian genres including salsa, Latin jazz, and Afro-Latin rhythms.

After growing up in Chocó and forming in Cali, the ChocQuibTown relocated to Bogotá and gained popularity performing in the city's bars. The group's first two albums, Somos Pacífico (2006) and Oro (2010) were bolstered by the singles "Somos Pacífico" and "De Donde Vengo Yo", with the latter song winning a Latin Grammy in 2011. The band's third album, Eso Es Lo Que Hay (2011) experienced further success, featuring the single "Hasta el Techo", followed by El Mismo (2015). The group's latest album, Sin Miedo, was released in 2018.

== History ==
=== Early years ===
"ChocQuibTown emerged as a project of chocoano rappers who sing and talk about Chocó. Rap always talks about the city, but what we wanted to talk about other things: the river, the Pacific, and our land."

— Goyo, on the group's aim to represent its home state.

Gloria Martínez (born 12 July 1982) and her younger brother Miguel (born 1986) were both born and grew up in the small town of Condoto in the department of Chocó in western Colombia. They were exposed to a wide variety of music from a young age as their father Miguel had a large collection of records ranging from salsa and local chirimia bands to Western pop such as Michael Jackson and Gloria has said that her nickname "Goyo" comes from the fact that as a girl she loved listening to her father's records, in particular "Goyito Sabater" by the Puerto Rican band El Gran Combo - she sang along to the song so often that her family started calling her "Goyito", which was later shortened to "Goyo".

Their father, Miguel, was from a musical family: his cousin was Jairo Varela, founder of Grupo Niche, one of Colombia's best known salsa bands. Due to his job as an electrician the Martínez family moved first to the department's capital Quibdó, where his children Gloria and Miguel first met and became friends with Quibdó native Carlos Yahony Valencia (born March 5, 1981), and then later to the sea port of Buenaventura. As Colombia's major Pacific port the town saw a lot of trade coming in from the US, and the Martínez children started to hear American hip hop music from Los Angeles and other parts of the US, brought by the sailors on the ships.

Having graduated from school in Buenaventura, Gloria moved to Cali to study psychology at university, while also becoming involved in the city's fledgling underground hip hop scene. It was in Cali in 2000 that she met Valencia again, who had moved with his mother to live in the city, and was now also involved in rapping. Over a meeting in one of Cali's parks, Valencia told Martínez about his idea to create a band to make a fusion of Colombian Afro-Caribbean music and hip hop from the perspective of the Afro-Caribbean people of the Chocó, and to promote this neglected corner and culture of Colombia, an idea that appealed to Martínez. Her brother Miguel, who had become interested in producing music on his computer, asked to join them, and ChocQuibTown was born. The band named themselves after the city and department that they had grown up in: Tostao said that "we chose the name because it's very sonorous, and in music all the elements you use must be focused in sound".

=== 2004–2010: Early success and Oro ===
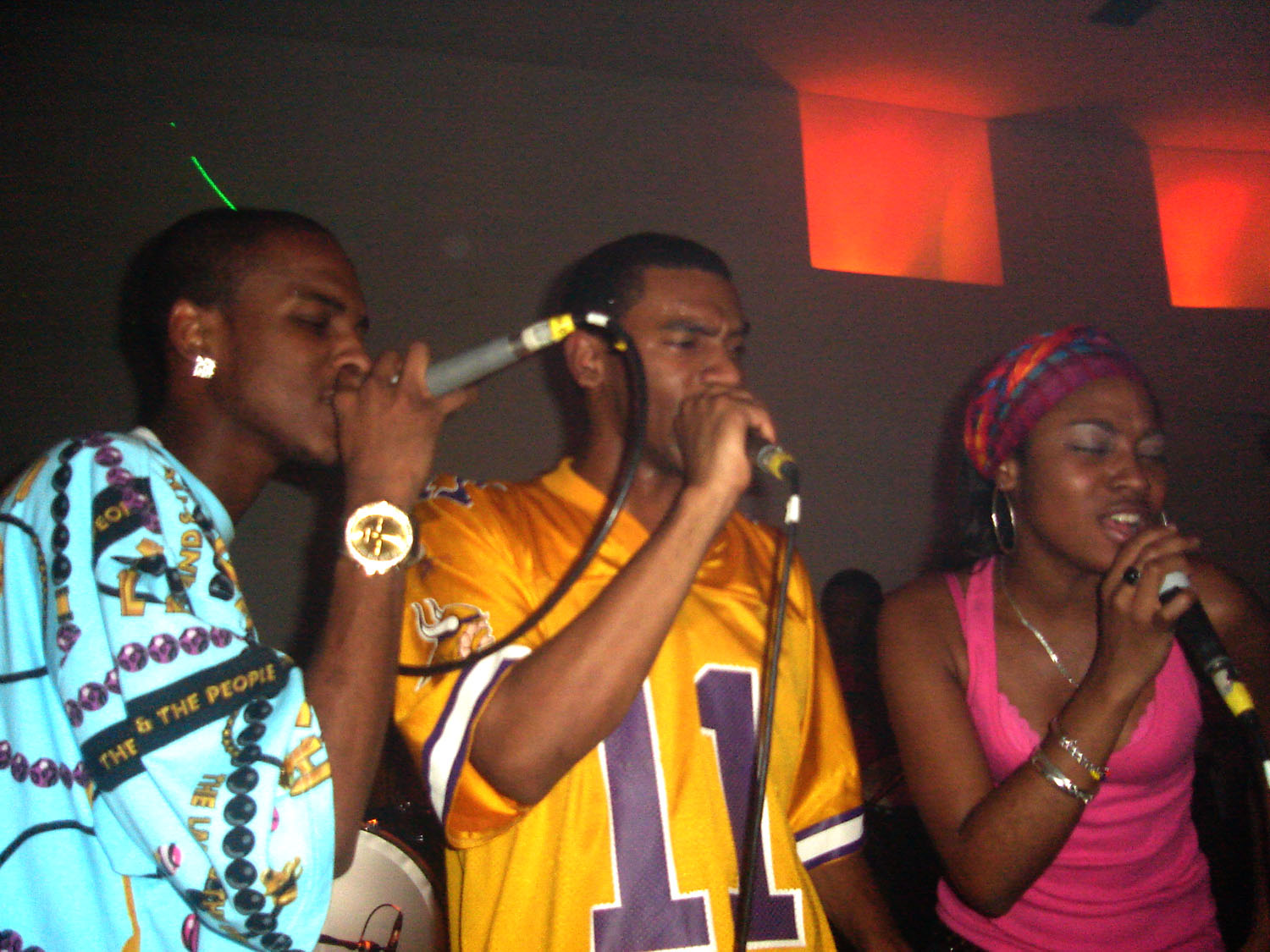
ChocQuibTown performing in 2007

Tostao convinced the Martínez siblings to move to Bogotá to pursue their musical ambitions. In Bogotá, Tostao sung with various local bands, including Mensajeros, Carbono and La Mojarra Eléctrica. Goyo was invited to join the salsa/electronic group Sidestepper - the group's founders Richard Blair and Iván Benavides heard the musical ideas of Tostao and Goyo and encouraged them to pursue their ambitions and record their own songs. The group played frequently at bars on Bogota's 7th Avenue, often without pay. The band received its big break at the "Hip Hop al Parque" festival in the capital in 2004, winning the competition for best band at the festival, their prize being US$5,000. The prize winnings funded the recording and production of the band's first album, Somos Pacífico (2006).

Somos Pacífico was recorded and released independently by the band and produced by Blair and Benavides. Their music and live shows were gaining a reputation and in 2008 ChocQuibTown signed to Nacional Records and released their second album, Oro. The title, meaning "Gold" in English, is a reference to the exploitation of minerals in their native region, where gold miners barely make enough money to survive. The album also became their first international release with US and UK versions the following year, although these differed from the Colombian version, being compilations of tracks from both Somos Pacífico and the Colombian release of Oro. The group undertook an extensive world tour in 2010 (including more than 40 dates in Europe alone), which included the festivals of South by Southwest in the US, Glastonbury and Lovebox in the UK, Roskilde in Denmark, and Parkpop in the Netherlands.

The group won a Latin Grammy in November 2010 for the single "De Donde Vengo Yo". The politically charged song is a "spirited lament of the hard-luck life: multinationals and corrupt politicians get rich off gold and platinum; poor blacks get run off their land by illegal militias. Oro was nominated for Best Latin Alternative/Rock/Urban Album at the 53rd Grammy Awards. Richard Blair, producer of Oro, commented on the nomination by saying, "To get some official recognition, and from outside of Colombia at that, is almost the first time in 400 years that someone has recognized the people from Choco for something other than slavery and gold mines and corruption."

=== 2011–2014: Eso Es Lo Que Hay ===
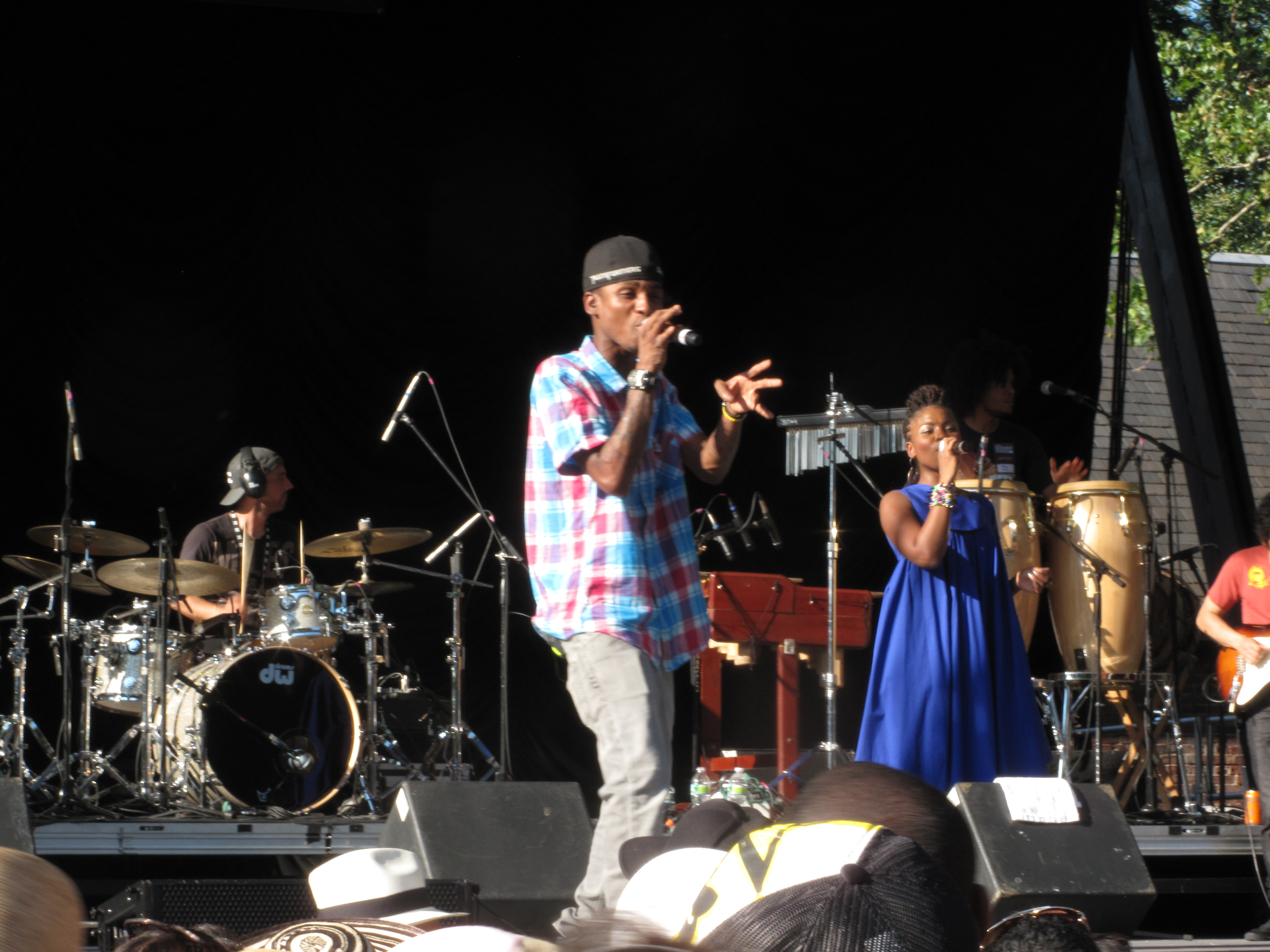
ChocQuibTown performing at Central Park Summer Stage, New York City, 2011

Following the success of "De Donde Vengo Yo" at the Latin Grammys the band signed with Sony Music Colombia to support its follow-up album Eso Es Lo Que Hay. The group's third album, Eso Es Lo Que Hay, was released on Sony Music in November 2011, and was produced by Andrés Castro and Slow. The album contains a collaboration with Nicaraguan salsa singer Luis Enrique. At the 2012 Latin Grammy Awards, Eso Es Lo Que Hay was nominated for Album of the Year and Best Alternative Music Album, with the song "Calentura" (featuring Puerto Rican rapper Tego Calderón) being nominated for Record of the Year.

In 2013, the band released Behind the Machine (Detrás de la Máquina), an album of songs from their previous albums, but re-recorded in a simpler, more stripped-down style. Goyo described it as an "organic album", made to "take back the essence and reflect it in an album that is very important for our career...it reflects a maturity in the sound". On this release, the band also hoped to highlight specific instruments, such as piano and marimba. The album also included the new jazz-influenced song "Condoto", an ode to Goyo and Slow's birthplace that was devastated by a powerful gale in May 2015. Additionally, in 2014, the group joined fellow Colombian artist Carlos Vives on his song “El Mar de Sus Ojos”, which was a number one hit in Colombia, peaked at number 11 on the U.S. Billboard Hot Latin Songs chart.

=== 2015–present: El Mismo and Sin Miedo ===
The band released El Mismo in 2015, led by the reggae-tinged love song "Cuando Te Veo". The single reached number 13 on the Billboard US Tropical Songs chart, number 16 on the Billboard Latin Rhythm Airplay chart, and number 29 on the Billboard US Latin Pop chart. Leila Cobo of Billboard noted a more commercial sound on El Mismo, viewing the album as an effort to transform the group from "critical curio to commercial star" that "appends pop song structure and stickier hooks to the band's eclecticism." The group shot the music video for "Nuquí (Te Quiero Para Mí)" on the beaches of Nuquí in Chocó as a way to pay tribute to their home department and to encourage tourism to the area.

In November 2017, the band signed with Sony Music Latin during a ceremony in Miami, and planned to release an album entitled Sin Miedo in 2018. In January 2018, the group collaborated with American pianist Arthur Hanlon on the single "No Tuve La Culpa", which peaked at number 25 on the Billboard Tropical Airplay chart. The music video, filmed in Colombia, features Hanlon and the band performing on a moving pickup truck.

== Musical style and image ==
"De Donde Vengo Yo"
The band's breakout song from the album Oro (2008). Lyrically, the song discusses the neglect of the Chocó region at the hands of the Colombian government.

"Nuqui (Te Quiero Para Mi)"
This song, from El Mismo (2015) exhibits pop and reggae influences. Its title pays tribute to the beach town of Nuquí, located in western Chocó.

The group mixes the modern sounds of hip-hop with more traditional Colombian genres such as salsa, Latin jazz, and coastal rhythms, utilizing instruments such as congas, timbales, bongos, and trumpets. Billboard writer Leila Cobo describe's the band by saying, "Chocquibtown hails from Colombia's rural Pacific coast, but honed its sound in Cali, a gritty city, and one can hear both in the trio's music: a melange of hip-hop, reggaeton, electronica, ska, Afro-Latin rhythms and rapper-singer Goyo Martinez's soulful charisma." Phil Freeman of Allmusic compared the group to Elephunk-era Black Eyed Peas in its "upbeat performance style, lack of gangsta attitude, and male-female dynamic", stating that the group maintains a "positive attitude with a hint of edge, and dancefloor- and radio-friendly music, without devolving into pure pop pandering."

Lyrically, the band discusses Afro-Latino identity and taking pride in its native region. Member Tostao explains, "It is important to generate that pride for our people because our country is always talking about negative things like guerrillas and drug traffickers, that kind of thing and we want to show another side." A common theme in the group's lyrics is the goal of attaining more inclusion for Afro-Colombians in the rest of Colombian society and in Latin America as a whole. The group hopes to denounce racism and discrimination in its lyrics without accusing non Afro-Colombian listeners of racism as to not alienate listeners from other areas. Songs such as "Oro" and "De Donde Vengo Yo" discuss exploitation of Choco's natural resources where minerals and other materials were extracted, leaving nothing for the region's inhabitants.

The band is highly respected in its hometown. Eddi Marcelin, Cultural Diversity and Youth Manager of NGO ACDI/VOCA who hails from Chocó, explains "Not only are they popular in terms of musical value, but the people of Chocó, especially the youth, look up to them as role models. Through their music and success, ChocQuibTown provide hope that even someone coming from such a difficult area can overcome the hardships of life and achieve international fame." In the band's lyrics and interviews, the members of ChocQuibTown have been openly critical of institutionalized racism in Colombia that they feel is often unacknowledged in Colombian society. The group has been praised for pointing out exclusion of Afro-Colombians in the media, from music to telenovelas.

However, the band has received criticism from other Colombian hip-hop artists. The band was dissed in 2010 by Bogota-based hip-hop group Shakema Crew in the song "Game Over ChocQuibTown". In the song, Shakema Crew accused ChocQuibTown of being sell-outs that lack the authenticity of "real hip-hop", and threatened the band with violence by proclaiming "Death to ChocQuibTown". The diss track was criticized for containing lyrics that were considered racist. Bogota rapper JHT also criticized ChocQuibTown in his song "Mi Rap es Veneno / El Blues del Rap" for, in his view, diluting the authentic hip-hop sound by incorporating other musical genres. In response, ChocQuibTown claimed that for Colombian artists to challenge imperialism through music, artists must incorporate local musical styles instead of trying to emulate U.S. rappers.

== Personal life ==
Tostao and Goyo have been a couple since 2002: they married on December 7, 2011, in a hacienda a short distance north of Bogota. In October 2012 they announced they were expecting their first child in April 2013.

== Discography ==
=== Studio albums ===
- Somos Pacifico (2006)
- Oro (2010)
- Eso Es Lo Que Hay (2012)
- El Mismo (2015)
- Sin Miedo (2018)
- ChocQuib House (2020)
