= List of awards and nominations received by Caetano Veloso =

Caetano Veloso awards and nominations
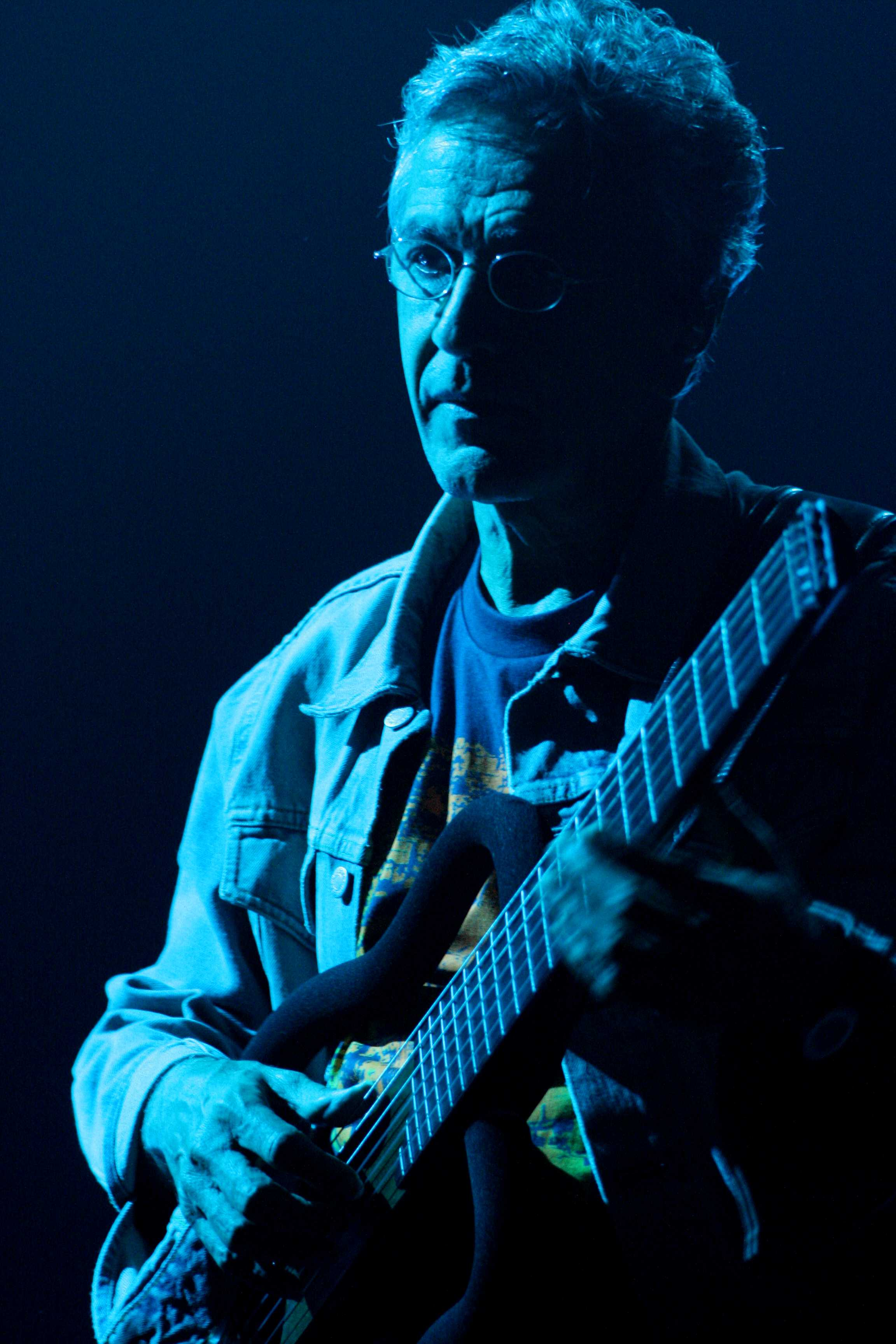
- Veloso performing at TIM Festival
Awards and nominations
Award	Wins	Nominations
Grammy Awards	3	6
Grande Prêmio do Cinema Brasileiro	1	3
Havana Film Festival	1	1
Latin Grammy Awards	13	30
MTV Video Music Brasil	2	9
Premios Ondas	1	1
Troféu Imprensa	5	5

Totals (Note: Certain award groups do not simply award one winner. They acknowledge several different recipients, have runners-up, and have third place. Since this is a specific recognition and is different from losing an award, runner-up mentions are considered wins in this award tally. For simplification and to avoid errors, each award in this list has been presumed to have had a prior nomination.)
- Wins: 20
- Nominations: 51

Caetano Veloso is a Brazilian composer, singer and guitarist who has released over twenty studio albums and received various awards and nominations, including three Grammy Awards out of six nominations and thirteen Latin Grammy Awards from thirty nominations.

Veloso has received five Grammy Award nominations, including three for Best World Music Album, winning two of them for Livro in 2000 and João Voz e Violão in 2001.

At the Latin Grammy Awards, Veloso has won several times in the categories within the Portuguese language field, including Best MPB Album three times, Best Brazilian Song twice and Best Brazilian Rock Album once. Plus, he has been nominated for Album of the Year twice, for Livro in 2000 and Especial Ivete, Gil e Caetano in 2012 and for Song of the Year twice, for "Um Abraçaço" and "A Bossa Nova É Foda" in 2013 and 2014 respectively.

Additionally, he was received awards for his work in film scores, including the Grande Prêmio do Cinema Brasileiro for Best Score for Orfeu in 2000 and the Best Music award for O Quatrilho at the Havana Film Festival in 1995.

== Grammy Awards ==
The Grammy Awards are presented annually by the Recording Academy to recognize achievement in the music industry.

Year	Category	Nominated work	Result	Ref.
2000	Best World Music Album	Livro	Won	
2001	Best World Music Album	João Voz e Violão (with João Gilberto)	Won	
2002	Best Tropical Latin Album	"Canto" (with Los Super Seven)	Nominated	
2004	Best Contemporary World Music Album	Live in Bahia	Nominated	
2017	Best World Music Album	Dois Amigos, Um Século De Música: Multishow Live (with Gilberto Gil)	Nominated	

== Grande Prêmio do Cinema Brasileiro ==
The Grande Prêmio do Cinema Brasileiro is a Brazilian film award presented by the Academia Brasileira de Cinema.

Year	Category	Nominated work	Result	Ref.
2000	Best Score	Orfeu	Won	
2010	Best Score	Coração Vagabundo	Nominated	
2013	Best Score	Reis e Ratos (shared with Mauro Lima)	Nominated	

== Havana Film Festival ==
The Havana Film Festival is a Cuban festival focused on the promotion of Latin American cinema.

Year	Category	Nominated work	Result	Ref.
1995	Best Music	O Quatrilho (shared with Jaques Morelenbaum)	Won	

== Latin Grammy Awards ==
The Latin Grammy Awards are an award presented annually by The Latin Recording Academy to recognize outstanding achievement in the Latin music industry.

Year	Category	Nominated work	Result	Ref.
2000	Album of the Year	Livro	Nominated	
2000	Best MPB Album	Livro	Won	
2000	Producer of the Year	Caetano Veloso	Nominated	
2001	Best Brazilian Song	"Sou Seu Sabiá"	Nominated	
2001	Best Brazilian Song	"Zera a Reza"	Nominated	
2001	Best MPB Album	Noites Do Norte	Won	
2003	Best MPB Album	Eu não peço desculpa (with Jorge Mautner)	Won	
2003	Best Brazilian Pop Contemporary Album	Live in Bahia	Nominated	
2007	Best Singer-Songwriter Album	cê	Won	
2007	Best Brazilian Song	"Não Me Arrependo"	Won	
2008	Best MPB Album	Multishow Ao Vivo Cê	Nominated	
2009	Best Singer-Songwriter Album	Zii e Zie	Won	
2009	Best Long Form Music Video	E A Música de Tom Jobim (with Roberto Carlos)	Won	
2009	Best Brazilian Song	"A Cor Amarela"	Nominated	
2011	Best MPB Album	Multishow Ao Vivo Caetano e Maria Gadú (with Maria Gadú)	Nominated	
2011	Best Brazilian Rock Album	Zii e Zie – Ao Vivo	Won	
2012	Album of the Year	Especial Ivete, Gil e Caetano (with Gilberto Gil and Ivete Sangalo)	Nominated	
2012	Best MPB Album	Especial Ivete, Gil e Caetano (with Gilberto Gil and Ivete Sangalo)	Won	
2012	Best Long Form Music Video	Especial Ivete, Gil e Caetano (with Gilberto Gil and Ivete Sangalo)	Nominated	
2012	Best Alternative Song	"Neguinho" – Gal Costa (as songwriter)	Nominated	
2012	Person of the Year		Recipient	
2013	Record of the Year	"Um Abraçaço"	Nominated	
2013	Song of the Year	"Um Abraçaço"	Nominated	
2013	Best Brazilian Song	"Um Abraçaço"	Nominated	
2013	Best Singer-Songwriter Album	Abraçaço	Won	
2014	Song of the Year	"A Bossa Nova É Foda"	Nominated	
2014	Best Brazilian Song	"A Bossa Nova É Foda"	Won	
2020	Best MPB Album	Caetano Veloso & Ivan Sacerdote (with Ivan Sacerdote)	Nominated	
2020	Best Portuguese Language Song	"Pardo" – Céu (as songwriter)	Nominated	
2021	Record of the Year	"Talvez" (with Tom Veloso)	Won	

Note: At the 2nd Annual Latin Grammy Awards, Noites Do Norte won Best Engineered Album, the award went to the engineer of the album, Moogie Canazio and Marcelo Sabóia.
Note: At the 14th Annual Latin Grammy Awards, Abraçaço also won Best Recording Package, the award went to the art directors of the album, Tonho Quinta-Feira and Fernando Young.

== MTV Video Music Brasil ==
The MTV Video Music Brazil were an annual award ceremony presented by MTV Brasil to recognize the best in music, pop culture and online culture chosen by MTV viewers.

Year	Category	Nominated work	Result	Ref.
1998	Video of the Year	"Não Enche"	Nominated	
1998	Best MPB Video	"Não Enche"	Won	
1998	Best Direction in Music Video	"Não Enche"	Nominated	
1999	Video of the Year	"Sozinho"	Nominated	
1999	Audience Choice	"Sozinho"	Nominated	
1999	Best MPB Video	"Sozinho"	Nominated	
2002	Best MPB Video	"Todo Errado" (with Jorge Mautner)	Nominated	
2002	Best Direction in Music Video	"Todo Errado" (with Jorge Mautner)	Nominated	
2002	Best Cinematography in Video Clip	"Todo Errado" (with Jorge Mautner)	Won	

== Premios Ondas ==
The Premios Ondas are Spanish awards given by Radio Barcelona in recognition of professionals in the fields of radio and television broadcasting, the cinema, and the music industry.

Year	Category	Nominated work	Result	Ref.
1996	Best Latin Artist or Group	Caetano Veloso	Won	

== Troféu Imprensa ==
The Troféu Imprensa an award presented annually by the Sistema Brasileiro de Televisão.

Year	Category	Nominated work	Result	Ref.
1968	Newcomer of the Year	Caetano Veloso	Won	
1993	Best Male Singer	Caetano Veloso	Won	
2000	Best Male Singer	Caetano Veloso	Won	
