= 19th Annual Latin Grammy Awards =

Music awards presented Nov 2018

19th Latin Grammy Awards
- Date: November 15, 2018
- Venue: MGM Grand Garden Arena, Paradise, Nevada
- Hosted by: Melissa Francis and Carlos Rivera

Highlights
- Most awards: Jorge Drexler (3)
- Person of the Year: Maná
- Website: http://www.latingrammy.com/

Television/radio coverage
- Network: Univision

The 19th Annual Latin Grammy Awards was held on November 15, 2018 at the MGM Grand Garden Arena in Las Vegas.

== Performers ==
Artist(s)	Song(s)
Marc Anthony; Will Smith; Bad Bunny	"Está Rico"
Jorge Drexler; Natalia Lafourcade; Mon Laferte; El David Aguilar	"Telefonía"
Calibre 50	"Corrido De Juanito"
Carlos Vives; Monsieur Periné	"Hoy tengo tiempo (Pinta sensual)"
Kany García	"Para siempre"
Banda Los Recoditos	"Me darán ganas de verte"
Ozuna	"El Farsante" "Única"
J Balvin; Carla Morrison	"Vibras" "Ambiente"
Rosalía	"Malamente"
Jose Maria Cano; Daniel Cano	"Mi Religion"
Víctor Manuelle	"Quiero tiempo"
Ángela Aguilar	"La llorona"
Nicky Jam; J Balvin; Steve Aoki	"X" "Jaleo"
Maná	"En El Muelle De San Blás" "Labios Compartidos" "Clavado En Un Bar"
Sebastián Yatra; Halsey	"My Only One" "Without Me"
Bad Bunny	"Sensualidad" "Soy peor" "Chambea" "Estamos bien"
Pablo Alborán	"No Vaya a Ser"
Karol G	"Mi Cama"

== Winners and nominees ==
The following is the list of nominees.

=== General ===
Record of the Year

Jorge Drexler — "Telefonía"

- Pablo Alborán — "No Vaya a Ser"
- Anaadi — "É Fake (Homen Barato)"
- J Balvin and Willy William — "Mi Gente"
- Bomba Estéreo — "Internacionales"
- Kany García — "Para Siempre"
- Nicky Jam and J Balvin — "X"
- Natalia Lafourcade featuring Los Macorinos — "Danza de Gardenias"
- Monsieur Periné — "Bailar Contigo"
- Rosalía — "Malamente"

Album of the Year

Luis Miguel — ¡México Por Siempre!

- Pablo Alborán — Prometo
- J Balvin — Vibras
- Chico Buarque — Caravanas
- Jorge Drexler — Salvavidas de Hielo
- El David Aguilar — Siguiente
- Kany García — Soy Yo
- Natalia Lafourcade — Musas, Vol. 2
- Monsieur Periné — Encanto Tropical
- Rozalén — Cuando El Río Suena...

Song of the Year

Jorge Drexler — "Telefonía"

- Manú Jalil and Mon Laferte — "Antes De Ti" (Mon Laferte)
- Monsieur Periné — "Bailar Contigo"
- David Aguilar Dorantes and Natalia Lafourcade — "Danza de Gardenias" (Natalia Lafourcade Featuring Los Macorinos)
- El David Aguilar — "Embrujo"
- Rozalén — "La Puerta Violeta"
- Antón Alvarez Alfaro, Pablo Diaz-Reixa and Rosalía — "Malamente" (Rosalía)
- Kany García — "Para Siempre"
- Mauricio Rengifo, Andrés Torres, Carlos Vives and Sebastian Yatra — "Robarte un Beso" (Carlos Vives and Sebastian Yatra)
- Fito Páez — "Tu Vida, Mi Vida"

Best New Artist

Karol G

- Ángela Aguilar
- Anaadi
- El David Aguilar
- Alex Ferreira
- Los Petitfellas
- Nana Mendoza
- Christian Nodal
- Claudia Prieto
- Benjamín Walker

=== Pop ===
Best Contemporary Pop Vocal Album

Maluma — F.A.M.E.

- Axel — Ser
- Pablo López — Camino, Fuego y Libertad
- Beatriz Luengo — Cuerpo y Alma
- Nana Mendoza — Miradas

Best Traditional Pop Vocal Album

Laura Pausini — Hazte Sentir

- Pablo Alborán — Prometo
- Mojito Lite — Solo Los Buenos Momentos
- Carla Morrison — Amor Supremo Desnudo
- Nahuel Pennisi — Feliz

=== Urban ===
Best Urban Fusion/Performance

Rosalía — "Malamente"

- J Balvin and Willy William featuring Beyoncé — "Mi Gente"
- Bomba Estéreo — "Internacionales"
- Daddy Yankee featuring Puerto Rico Symphony Orchestra — "Yo Contra Ti"
- Major Lazer featuring Anitta and Pabllo Vittar — "Sua Cara"

Best Urban Music Album

J Balvin — Vibras

- ChocQuibTown — Sin Miedo
- Coastcity — Coastcity
- Ozuna — Odisea
- Tote King — Lebron

Best Urban Song

Daddy Yankee, Urbani Mota Cedeño, Juan G. Rivera Vazquez and Luis Jorge Romero — "Dura" (Daddy Yankee)

- Anitta, J. Balvin, Justin Quiles and Alejandro Ramírez — "Downtown" (Anitta Featuring J Balvin)
- Rene David Cano, Andy Clay, Karol G, Rayito and Omar Sabino — "Mi Cama" (Karol G)
- J Balvin, Bad Bunny, Juan M. Frías, Luian Malave, Prince Royce, Edgar Semper and Xavier Semper — "Sensualidad" (Bad Bunny, Prince Royce and J Balvin)
- J. Balvin, Nicky Jam and Juan Diego Medina Vélez — "X" (Nicky Jam and J Balvin)

=== Rock ===
Best Rock Album

Enrique Bunbury — Expectativas

- Richard Coleman — F-A-C-I-L
- Él Mató a un Policía Motorizado — La Síntesis O'Konor
- Los Pixel — Ahora Lo Sabes Todo
- No Te Va Gustar — Suenan Las Alarmas

Best Pop/Rock Album

Manolo García — Geometría del Rayo

- Bambi — El Encuentro
- Comisario Pantera — Cosmovisiones
- Ella Es Tan Cargosa — La Sangre Buena
- Lucas & The Woods — Pensacola Radio

Best Rock Song

Fito Páez — "Tu Vida Mi Vida"

- Santiago Motorizado — "Ahora Imagino Cosas" (Él Mató a un Policía Motorizado)
- Richard Coleman — "Días Futuros"
- Enrique Bunbury — "La Actitud Correcta"
- Leiva — "La Llamada"

=== Alternative ===
Best Alternative Music Album

Aterciopelados — Claroscura

- Dante Spinetta — Puñal
- Telmary — Fuerza Arará
- Vetusta Morla — Mismo Sitio, Distinto Lugar
- Zoé — Aztlan

Best Alternative Song

Antón Alvarez Alfaro, Pablo Diaz-Reixa and Rosalía — "Malamente" (Rosalía)

- León Larregui — "Azúl" (Zoé)
- Guillermo Galván — "Consejo de Sabios" (Vetusta Morla)
- Andrea Echeverri — "Dúo" (Aterciopelados)
- Dante Spinetta — "Mi Vida"

=== Tropical ===
Best Salsa Album

Víctor Manuelle — 25/7

- Alexander Abreu and Havana D' Primera — Cantor del Pueblo
- Charlie Aponte — Pa' Mi Gente
- Chiquito Team Band — Los Creadores del Sonido
- Pete Perignon — La Esquina del Bailador

Best Cumbia/Vallenato Album

Silvestre Dangond — Esto Es Vida

- Alberto Barros — Tributo a la Cumbia Colombiana 4
- Diana Burco — Diana Burco
- Jean Carlos Centeno & Ronal Urbina — De Parranda
- Juan Piña — La Elegancia de la Música

Best Contemporary Tropical Album

Carlos Vives — Vives

- Elvis Crespo — Diomedizao
- Milton Salcedo — Presenta: Swing 80
- Daniel Santacruz — Momentos de Cine
- Romeo Santos — Golden

Best Traditional Tropical Album

José Alberto "El Canario" and El Septeto Santiaguero — A Mi Qué - Tributo a los Clásicos Cubanos

- Rubén Blades with Roberto Delgado & Orquesta — Medoro Madera
- Sonora Santanera — La Fiesta Continúa
- Omara Portuondo — Omara Siempre
- María Rivas — Motivos

Best Tropical Fusion Album

Aymée Nuviola — Como Anillo al Dedo

- Manny Cruz — Sobrenatural
- Diego Gutiérrez — Palante el Mambo!
- Sheila King — Supernova
- Safara — Cucucuprá, Cuprá

Best Tropical Song

Juan Luis Guerra, Juan Carlos Luces and Víctor Manuelle — "Quiero Tiempo" (Víctor Manuelle featuring Juan Luis Guerra)

- Silvestre Dangond, Nicky Jam, Juan Medina, Mauricio Rengifo and Andrés Torres — "Casate Conmigo" (Silvestre Dangond featuring Nicky Jam)
- Jorge Luis Piloto — "Enamórate Bailando" (Reynier Pérez y Su Septeto Acarey featuring Gilberto Santa Rosa)
- Jorge Luis Piloto, Jean Rodríguez and Tony Succar — "Me Enamoro Más De Ti" (Tony Succar featuring Jean Rodríguez)
- Fonseca, Mauricio Rengifo and Andrés Torres — "Simples Corazones" (Fonseca)

=== Songwriter ===
Best Singer-Songwriter Album

Jorge Drexler — Salvavidas de Hielo

- El David Aguilar — Siguiente
- Kany García — Soy Yo
- Claudia Prieto — Compositores
- Raquel Sofía — 2:00 AM

=== Regional Mexican ===
Best Ranchero/Mariachi Album

Luis Miguel — ¡México Por Siempre!

- Ángela Aguilar — Primero Soy Mexicana
- Tania Libertad — Jose Alfredo y Yo
- Mariachi Sol De México De José Hernández - Leyendas de Mi Pueblo
- Christian Nodal — Me Dejé Llevar

Best Banda Album

Banda Los Recoditos — Los Gustos Que Me Doy

- Banda Los Sebastianes — En Vida
- Luis Coronel — Ahora Soy Yo
- Jerry Demara — Brindemos
- El Fantasma y Su Equipo Armado — En El Camino

Best Tejano Album

Roger Velásquez & The Latin Legendz — Tex Mex Funk

- Jimmy Gonzalez y Grupo Mazz — Porque Todavía Te Quiero
- Grupo Alamo — Próximo Nivel
- Proyecto Insomnio — Dolce Inferno: Dolce
- Michael Salgado — Otras Historias

Best Norteño Album

Calibre 50 — Guerra de Poder Pesado — Los Ángeles Existen

- Adrián Acosta — Irremplazable
- Conjunto Primavera — Con Toda La Fuerza
- Voz de Mando — El Que A Ti Te Gusta

Best Regional Song

Christian Nodal — "Probablemente"

- Domingo Leiva Delgado — "Arránquense Muchachos" (Pedro Fernández)
- Gabriel Flores and Yoel Henríquez — "Ayúdame A Olvidarte" (La Explosiva Banda De Maza)
- Edén Muñoz — "Corrido De Juanito" (Calibre 50)
- Salvador Hurtado — "El Sueño Americano" (La Energía Norteña)

=== Instrumental ===
Best Instrumental Album

Miguel Siso — Identidad

- Yamandu Costa — Recanto
- Hamilton De Holanda Trio — Hamilton De Holanda Trio - Jacob 10ZZ
- Airto Moreira — Aluê
- Hermeto Pascoal & Grupo — No Mundo Dos Sons

=== Traditional ===
Best Folk Album

Natalia Lafourcade — Musas, Vol. 2

- Afrodisíaco — Viene De Panamá (Sin Raíz No Hay País)
- Eva Ayllón — Clavo y Canela
- Marta Gómez — La Alegría y El Canto
- María Mulata — Idas y Vueltas
- Yubá-Iré — ¡Baila Conmigo!

Best Tango Album

Pedro Giraudo — Vigor Tanguero

- Daniel Binelli and Nick Danielson — Nostalgias
- Rodolfo Mederos Trio — Troilo Por Mederos, En Su Huella
- Omar Mollo and Gran Orquesta Típica Otra — Tango Cosmopolita
- Miguel Pereiro — Mística Ciudad

Best Flamenco Album

Arcángel — Al Este del Canto

- Dani de Morón — 21
- Alba Molina — Caminando con Manuel
- Rosario La Tremendita — Delirium Tremens
- Samuel Serrano — Dos Caminos

=== Jazz ===
Best Latin Jazz Album

Hermeto Pascoal and Big Band — Naturaleza Universal

- Adrian Iaies Trio — La Casa de un Pianista de Jazz
- Dafnis Prieto Big Band — Back to the Sunset
- Néstor Torres — Jazz Flute Traditions
- Bobby Valentin and The Latin Jazzists — Mind of a Master

=== Christian ===
Best Christian Album (Spanish Language)

Alfareros — Setenta Veces Siete

- Andy Alemany — Tú Primero
- Daniel Calveti — Habla Sobre Mí
- Marcela Gándara — Cerca Estás
- Miel San Marcos — Pentecostés (En Vivo)

Best Christian Album (Portuguese Language)

Fernanda Brum — Som Da Minha Vida

- Cassiane — Nivél Do Céu
- Anderson Freire — Contagem Regressiva
- Pr. Lucas — Pintor Do Mundo
- Léa Mendonça — Adoração Na Guerra Ao Vivo

=== Portuguese Language ===
Best Portuguese Language Contemporary Pop Album

Anaadi — Noturno

- Erasmo Carlos — Amor é Isso
- Iza — Dona de Mim
- Ana Vilela — Ana Vilela
- Xenia — Xenia

Best Portuguese Language Rock or Alternative Album

Lenine — Lenine Em Trânsito

- Tim Bernardes — Recomeçar
- Kassin — Relax
- Rubel — Casas
- Jay Vaquer — Ecos Do Acaso e Casos De Caos

Best Samba/Pagode Album

Maria Rita — Amor E Música

- Martinho da Vila — Alô Vila Isabeeeel!!!
- Ferrugem — Prazer, Eu Sou Ferrugem
- Diogo Nogueira — Munduê
- Thiaguinho — Só Vem! Ao Vivo

Best MPB Album

Chico Buarque — Caravanas

- João Bosco — Mano Que Zuera
- Edu Lobo, Dori Caymmi and Marcos Valle — Edu, Dori & Marcos
- Vitor Ramil — Campos Neutrais
- Elza Soares — Deus é Mulher

Best Sertaneja Music Album

Chitãozinho & Xororó — Elas Em Evidências

- Solange Almeida — Sentimento de Mulher
- As Galvão — 70 Anos
- Naiara Azevedo — Contraste
- Zezé Di Camargo & Luciano — Dois Tempos, Parte 2
- Fernando & Sorocaba — Sou Do Interior (Ao Vivo)
- Michel Teló — Bem Sertanejo - O Show

Best Portuguese Language Roots Album

Almir Sater and Renato Teixeira — +A3

- Anastácia — Dequele Jeito!
- Mariza — Mariza
- Sara Tavares — Fitxadu
- Borghetti Yamandu — Borghetti Yamandu

Best Portuguese Language Song

Chico Buarque — "As Caravanas"

- Pedro Baby, Pretinho Da Serrinha and Tribalistas — "Aliança" (Tribalistas)
- Nanda Costa, Lan Lan and Sambê — "Aponte" (Maria Bethânia)
- Erasmo Carlos, Dadi and Marisa Monte — "Convite Para Nascer De Novo" (Erasmo Carlos)
- Lucas Cirillo and Xenia — "Pra Que Me Chamas?" (Xenia)

=== Children's ===
Best Latin Children’s Album

Claraluna — Imaginare

- Ana & Gio — Ana & Gio
- Mundo Bita — Bita e a Natureza
- Luis Pescetti y Amigos — Magia Todo el Día
- Colectivo Animal — Un Bosque Encantado 2

=== Classical ===
Best Classical Album

Claudia Montero — Mágica y Misteriosa

- Allison Brewster Franzetti and Carlos Franzetti — Buenos Aires Noir
- José Menor — Enrique Granados: Goyescas
- José Serebrier — José Serebrier Conducts Granados
- Brasil Guitar Duo and David Amado — Leo Brouwer: The Book Of Signs, Paulo Bellinati: Concerto Caboclo

Best Classical Contemporary Composition

Claudia Montero — "Luces y Sombras. Concierto Para Guitarra y Orquesta De Cuerdas"

- Roberto Sierra — "Montuno En Forma De Chacona" (Silvia Márquez)
- Eddie Mora — "Ofrenda" (Eddie Mora directing The Orquesta Sinfónica De Heredia)
- Jorge Mejia — "Prelude In F Major For Piano & Orchestra" (Jorge Mejia and The Henry Mancini Institute Orchestra)
- Yalil Guerra — "String Quartet Nº.3 (In Memoriam Ludvvig Van Beethoven)" (La Catrina String Quartet)

=== Arrangement ===
Best Arrangement

Milton Salcedo — "Se Le Ve" (Milton Salcedo featuring Amaury Gutiérrez, Carlos Oliva y Michel Puche)

- Luiz Cláudio Ramos — "Massarandupió" (Chico Buarque)
- Rigoberto Alfaro — "No Me Platiques Más (Instrumental)" (Mariachi Divas de Cindy Shea)
- Lisandro Baum — "Batango" (Quinteto Bataraz)
- Vagner Cunha — "Campos Neutrais" (Vitor Ramil)

=== Recording Package ===
Best Recording Package

Carlos Sadness — Diferentes Tipos De Luz

- Miguel Vásquez "Masa" — La Gira (Sibilino)
- Daniel Eizirik — Meio Que Tudo É Um (Apanhador Só)
- Rubén Chumillas — Mismo Sitio, Distinto Lugar (Vetusta Morla)
- Christian Montenegro and Laura Varsky — 9 (Marco Sanguinetti)

=== Production ===
Best Engineered Album

Rafa Sardina and Eric Boulanger — 50 Años Tocando Para Ti (Orquesta Filarmónica De Bogotá)

- Gustavo Borner, Justin Moshkevich and Nick Baxter — Feliz (Nahuel Pennisi)
- Leo Bracht and Felipe Tichauer — Noturno (Anaadi)
- Thiago Baggio and Rodrigo Sanches — Rei Ninguém (Arthur Nogueira)
- Carles Campi Campón, Ernesto García, Pablo Martín Jones and Matías Cella — Salvavidas De Hielo (Jorge Drexler)

Producer of the Year

Linda Briceño

- Rafael Arcaute
- Visitante
- Andrés Torres and Mauricio Rengifo
- Julio Reyes Copello

=== Music video ===
Best Short Form Music Video

Juanes — "Pa Dentro"

- Bomba Estéreo — "Duele"
- Residente and Dillon Francis Featuring Ile — "Sexo"
- Residente — "Guerra"
- Rosalía — "Malamente"

Best Long Form Music Video

Pedro Capó — En Letra De Otro - Documentary

- La Santa Cecilia — Amar y Vivir Documentary
- Los Pericos — 3.000 Vivos
- Various Artists — Un Mundo Raro: Las Canciones De José Alfredo Jiménez
- Zoé — Panoramas

== Multiple Nominations and Awards ==
The following received multiple nominations:

Eight

- J Balvin

Five

- Rosalía
- El David Aguilar

Four

- Kany García
- Jorge Drexler
- Natalia Lafourcade
- Mauricio Rengifo
- Andrés Torres

Three

- Chico Buarque
- Monsieur Periné
- Pablo Alborán
- Nicky Jam
- Bomba Estéreo
- Anaadi
- Christian Nodal
- Zoé

Two

- Rozalén
- Karol G
- Luis Miguel
- Laura Pausini
- Carlos Vives
- Laura Pausini
- Willy William
- Residente
- Fito Páez
- Laura Pausini
- Ángela Aguilar
- Nana Mendoza
- Claudia Prieto
- Daddy Yankee
- Enrique Bunbury
- Richard Coleman
- Él Mató a un Policía Motorizado
- Aterciopelados
- Dante Spinetta
- Vetusta Morla
- Silvestre Dangond
- Víctor Manuelle
- Jorge Luis Piloto
- Calibre 50
- Xenia
- Erasmo Carlos
