= Meu Coco =

Studio album by Caetano Veloso
- Released: 21 October 2021
- Genres: MPB; tropicália
- Length: 43:57
- Language: Portuguese
- Labels: Sony Music; Uns Produções
- Producers: Caetano Veloso, Lucas Nunes

Caetano Veloso chronology
Abraçaço (2012)	Meu Coco (2021)

Singles from Meu Coco
- 1. "Anjos Tronchos" Released: 16 September 2021

Meu Coco (lit. 'my coconut' – colloquial for 'my head' or 'my coco' with 'coco' meaning a song from the brazilian northeastern genre coco) is a studio album by Brazilian singer, songwriter, and guitarist Caetano Veloso, released on 21 October 2021 through Sony Music and Uns Produções. It is his first studio album of entirely original compositions since his last, Abraçaço (2012), following a nine-year hiatus from solo studio work. Meu Coco was written and recorded during the COVID-19 pandemic. It was largely produced in the home studio of Veloso's apartment in Rio de Janeiro, with assistance from musician and producer Lucas Nunes. "Anjos Tronchos" was released as the lead and only single on 16 September 2021.

Musically, Meu Coco is an MPB and tropicália album with elements of samba and religious influences. The album features a guest appearance by Portuguese artist Carminho. Across its 12 tracks, they explore themes such as love, identity, prophecy, and Brazilian cultural memory. Veloso references figures like João Gilberto and Maria Bethânia, incorporates Middle Eastern and Afro-Brazilian rhythms, and engages with political commentary, particularly in response to the Presidency of Jair Bolsonaro. The album received generally positive reviews from critics and was nominated for Best MPB Album at the 2022 Latin Grammy Awards. It also appeared on four year-end best-of lists from publications including El País Uruguay, Le Monde, NPR, and The Washington Post.

== Background and production ==
In 2012, Caetano Veloso released Abraçaço, a Latin Grammy Awards-winning studio album that showcased his continued experimentation with eclectic Brazilian sounds. This project was followed by Dois Amigos, Um Século de Música: Multishow Live (2016), a collaborative tour and album with longtime collaborator Gilberto Gil, which celebrated their decades-long partnership. By 2019, Veloso had shifted focus to a minimalist live project with Brazilian clarinetist Ivan Sacerdote, touring briefly in Brazil alongside guitarist Felipe Geides. Plans to expand the tour nationally were halted in early 2020 due to the COVID-19 pandemic. Concurrently, Veloso abandoned preparations for a new studio album involving dancers from the Folkloric Ballet of Bahia, as lockdowns rendered collaborative sessions impossible.

The album, created during the COVID-19 pandemic, was largely recorded in the home studio of Veloso's Rio de Janeiro apartment with assistance from Lucas Nunes. The singer and his wife, Paula Lavigne, moved into the apartment during the early months of the lockdown. He began recording demos of unreleased material. These sessions evolved into Meu Coco, his first solo album of entirely new compositions since Abraçaço. With a space transformed into a "creative hub", Veloso's surroundings influenced the intimate, reflective nature of the work. The lead and only single "Anjos Tronchos", which also served to announce the album, was announced on the artist's social media accounts on 13 September 2021. The announcement references a line from the song's lyrics. It was released on digital music platforms on 16 September 2021. Meu Coco is Portuguese for "my coconut", a colloquial expression meaning "my head". The album was released on 21 October 2021 through the labels Sony Music and Uns Produções.

== Musical style ==
Music critics have categorized Meu Coco as a MPB and tropicália recording. The album consists of 12 tracks that address themes such as prophecy, names, love, and interpretations of Brazilian culture and the world. The album begins with the title track "Meu Coco", which blends poetic reflections with cultural references, including mentions of figures like João Gilberto, Maria Bethânia, and Nara Leão, while incorporating elements of samba and religious influences. "Ciclâmen do Líbano" presents a Middle Eastern romantic theme set against darbuka rhythms, influenced by the work of Austrian composer and conductor Anton Webern. "Anjos Tronchos" explores about the disorder of the technological world in which "leading clowns emerge macabre, equipped with total controls", with dark guitar riffs and zabumba beats supporting its introspective lyrics. "Não Vou Deixar" references political oppression under the Presidency of Jair Bolsonaro, offering a pop anthem about resilience amidst struggles, which picks up the flow of funk carioca, created from a rap base synthesized by Lucas Nunes and recorded with percussion played by Vinicius Cantuária.

"Autoacalanto" serves as a lullaby for Veloso's grandson, to which his father Tom Veloso plays the guitar, inspired by the child's soothing vocalizations as he learned to sing himself to sleep. "Enzo Gabriel" reflects on future generations, with an accordion melody adding a melancholic tone. Of the aforementioned track, Veloso states: "I never met anybody with that name but read in the newspaper that most Brazilian baby boys born between 2018 and 2019 were named Enzo Gabriel". "GilGal" touches on a Candomblé beat created and performed by Moreno Veloso. "Cobre" combines orchestral and samba elements in a narrative set in Bahia, arranged by Jaques Morelenbaum. "Pardo", originally performed by Céu, addresses homoerotic themes with brass arrangements. "Você-Você" is a collaborative track with Portuguese fado singer Carminho, playing with language and pronouns. "Sem Samba Não Dá" incorporates contemporary references within a samba framework. The album concludes with "Noite de Cristal", a piece he originally wrote in the 1990s for his sister Maria Bethânia, reflecting on patience and hope.

== Critical reception ==
Professional ratings
Review scores
Source	Rating
Folha de S.Paulo	Favorable
G1	5/5 stars
Le Nouvel Obs	4/5 stars
Monkeybuzz	Favorable
Música Instantânea	8.5/10
Uncut	9/10

Meu Coco was met with mostly positive acclaim from various music critics. Lucas Brêda, writing for Folha de S.Paulo, described Meu Coco as a reaffirmation of Veloso's enduring faith in Brazil's cultural richness and potential, even in challenging times. He noted that the album reflects a blend of "magic despite the misery" and highlights Veloso's ability to draw inspiration from both the legacy of icons like João Gilberto and the innovations of new generations, such as Djonga, Duda Beat, MC Cabelinho and Leo Santana. Tracks like "Não Vou Deixar" and "Sem Samba Não Dá" demonstrate Veloso's "unyielding belief in the power of music" as a form of resistance and hope. Silvio Essinger from O Globo, described Meu Coco as a work of "quantity and intensity", where "each track has its own life". Essinger praised Veloso's ability to merge contemporary themes with his musical legacy, highlighting the album's dialogue with Brazil's cultural and political landscape. Music journalist Mauro Ferreira, writing for G1, rated the album with five stars, praising the album as a "rich and ambitious" album that balances Brazil's artistic vibrancy with its social dissonances, concluding that Meu Coco showcases Veloso's "mastery of musical storytelling", reaffirming his role as a pillar of Brazilian artistry. Meu Coco received a nomination for Best MPB Album at the 2022 Latin Grammy Awards.

=== Rankings ===
Select rankings of Meu Coco
Publication	List	Rank	Ref.
El País Uruguay	The 10 Best International Albums of 2021	3	
Le Monde	Aureliano Tonet's Favorite Albums in 2021	4	
NPR	Suraya Mohamed's Top 10 Albums of 2021	10	
The Washington Post	Best Music of 2021	3	

== Track listing ==
All tracks are written by Caetano Veloso and Lucas Nunes.

No.	Title	Length
1.	"Meu Coco"	3:09
2.	"Ciclâmen do Líbano"	4:05
3.	"Anjos Tronchos"	3:52
4.	"Não Vou Deixar"	4:11
5.	"Autoacalanto"	2:18
6.	"Enzo Gabriel"	4:49
7.	"GilGal"	4:01
8.	"Cobre"	3:08
9.	"Pardo"	3:44
10.	"Você-Você" (Feat. Carminho)	4:00
11.	"Sem Samba Não Dá"	3:32
12.	"Noite de Cristal"	3:02
Total length:		43:57

== Personnel ==
The process of creating Meu Coco attributes the following credits:

Musicians

- Caetano Veloso – lead vocals (tracks 1–12), acoustic guitar (tracks 1–12)
- Lucas Nunes – acoustic guitar (tracks 1–12), bass guitar (tracks 1, 3), electric guitar (track 3), pocket piano (tracks 1, 5), synthesizer (tracks 2, 8), backing vocals (track 11)
- Márcio Victor – timbal (tracks 1, 4, 6, 9), talk drums (track 6), timbales (track 6), atabaque (tracks 1, 6, 12), darbuka (track 2), shaker (tracks 3, 7), bucket drum (track 6), tambourine (track 11), rim shot (track 9), marching bass drum (tracks 6, 12)
- Vinicius Cantuária – snare drum (tracks 1, 5, 7), kick drum (track 7), tambourine (track 3), repinique (tracks 4, 9), drum kit (tracks 2, 11, 12), caxixi (track 5), rattle (track 4)
- Marcelo Costa – drum kit (tracks 4, 7, 9), brushes (track 7), repinique (track 8), caxixi (tracks 2, 6), prato e faca (track 8)
- Miguel Góes – bass guitar (track 5)
- Mestrinho – accordion (track 10)
- Dora Morelenbaum – lead vocals (track 7), backing vocals (track 11)
- Carminho – lead vocals (track 10)
- Moreno Veloso – bell (track 7), bass drum (tracks 7, 9), agogô (tracks 6, 7), rum drum (track 7), backing vocals (tracks 1, 11)
- Tom Veloso – acoustic guitar (track 5), backing vocals (tracks 1, 11)
- Zé Ibarra – acoustic guitar (track 4), backing vocals (track 11)
- Hamilton De Holanda – mandolin (track 10)
- Thiago Amud – wind arrangements (track 1)
- Jaques Morelenbaum – cello (tracks 2, 8, 12)
- Iura Ranevsky – cello (tracks 2, 8, 12)
- Letieres Leite – flute (track 9), wind arrangements (track 9), conducting (track 9)
- Pedro Sá – electric guitar (track 3), bass guitar (track 3)

Studio production

- Paula Lavigne – executive production
- Jaques Morelenbaum – string arrangements (tracks 2, 8, 12)
- Iura Ranevsky – string coordination (tracks 2, 8, 12)
- Letieres Leite – wind arrangements (track 9), conducting
- Emílio Souza Santos – wind coordination
- Pedro Sá – arrangement assistance

== Charts ==
Weekly chart performance for Meu Coco
Chart (2022)	Peak position
Portuguese Albums (AFP)	10

== Release history ==
Release dates and formats for Meu Coco
Region	Date	Label	Format(s)	Ref.
Various	21 October 2021	Sony Music, Uns Produções	Digital download; streaming; vinyl	
Europe	17 December 2021	Sony Music	CD	
