= Edu, Dori & Marcos =

Studio album by Edu Lobo, Dori Caymmi and Marcos Valle
- Released: May 25, 2018
- Recorded: 2018
- Genres: MPB; Bossa nova
- Length: 46:10
- Label: Biscoito Fino
- Producers: Sônia Lobo; Guto Burgos; Patrícia Alvi

Edu Lobo chronology
Dos Navegantes (2017)	Edu, Dori & Marcos (2018)	Quase Memória (2019)

Dori Caymmi chronology
Voz de mágoa (música do Brasil) (2016)	Edu, Dori & Marcos (2018)	Sonetos Sentimentais Para Violão e Orquestra (2022)

Marcos Valle chronology
Marcos Valle & Stacey Kent: Ao Vivo Comemorando os 50 Anos de Marcos Valle (2014)	Edu, Dori & Marcos (2018)	Sempre (2019)

Edu, Dori & Marcos is a Brazilian popular music album produced collaboratively by Brazilian musicians Edu Lobo, Dori Caymmi, and Marcos Valle, released on May 25, 2018, by the Biscoito Fino record label. The album was nominated for a Latin Grammy Award for Best MPB Album at the 2018 awards.

== Background ==
Recorded in 2018, according to journalist Rafael Gregorio of the São Paulo newspaper Folha de S. Paulo, the idea originated in 2016, initiated by Marcos Valle, who was performing with singer Stacey Kent to promote a DVD they had recorded in the United States. When the tour arrived in São Paulo, Brazil, the musician saw a good opportunity to get his friends together.

Born 19 days apart, Valle, Edu Lobo, and Dori Caymmi were longtime friends and fans of João Gilberto and witnessed the emergence of Bossa nova, having been present since the beginning of the movement. Friends since childhood, they studied together at the traditional Catholic school St. Ignatius College, located in the Botafogo neighborhood in the southern part of Rio.

Although it is a collaborative album, each artist recorded their song individually. In an interview with Leonardo Lichote, from the Rio de Janeiro newspaper O Globo, Dori stated that this choice was based on “each artist doing it their own way. But in fact, we already knew each other's vision, and that's why we got together.” In addition to the trio, the album features compositions by Ruy Guerra, Nelson Motta, Jorge Amado, Chico Buarque, Paulo César Pinheiro, Paulo Sérgio Valle, and a poem by Portuguese poet Fernando Pessoa that was set to music by Dori.

== Track listing ==
No.	Title	Writer(s)	Lead interpreter	Length
1.	"Na ribeira deste rio" (poem by Fernando Pessoa)	Dori Caymmi / Fernando Pessoa	Edu Lobo	4:38
2.	"Bloco do eu sozinho"	Marcos Valle / Ruy Guerra	Dori Caymmi	3:10
3.	"Saveiros"	Dori Caymmi / Nelson Motta	Marcos Valle	3:53
4.	"Na Ilha de Lia, no barco de Rosa"	Edu Lobo / Chico Buarque	Dori Caymmi	4:03
5.	"O amor é chama"	Marcos Valle / Paulo Sérgio Valle	Edu Lobo	4:11
6.	"Canto triste"	Edu Lobo / Vinicius de Moraes	Marcos Valle	3:20
7.	"Viola enluarada"	Marcos Valle / Paulo Sérgio Valle	Edu Lobo	4:21
8.	"Alegre menina"	Dori Caymmi / Jorge Amado	Marcos Valle	3:30
9.	"Passa por mim"	Marcos Valle / Paulo Sérgio Valle	Dori Caymmi	3:57
10.	"Velho piano"	Dori Caymmi / Paulo César Pinheiro	Edu Lobo	4:06
11.	"Dos navegantes"	Edu Lobo / Paulo César Pinheiro	Dori Caymmi	5:03
12.	"Corrida de jangada"	Edu Lobo / Capinan	Marcos Valle	2:13
Total length:				46:10

== Release ==
The album was released on May 25, 2018, by the Rio de Janeiro-based record label Biscoito Fino, in CD format and on streaming platforms.

== Reception ==
=== Critics ===
Journalist and music critic Mauro Ferreira, in his blog on G1, gave the album three stars out of five, pointing out that "Since there is no interaction whatsoever, the documentary and artistic value of the album is reduced. [...] In any case, while there is a lack of interaction between the three artists, there is plenty of unity throughout the 12 tracks on the album Edu, Dori & Marcos. This unity also gives the album a certain linearity that could have made it more anthological and seductive than it actually is." Journalist Maria Carolina Maia, writing for Veja magazine, gave the album a positive review, adding that “the album showcases a repertoire with a consistent sound, featuring piano, guitar, percussion, and wind instruments as the foundation for the trio's beautiful voices.”

Critic Julinho Bittencourt, writing for Fórum magazine, gave a positive review of the album: “There is, in fact, nothing new in the beautiful album ‘Edu, Dori e Marcos’. But it is from a time when our music received one of its last breaths of novelty. [...] An album by masters, with everything you would expect from them.” In his column in Jornal do Brasil, musician Aquiles Rique Reis gave the album a positive review and celebrated the collaboration.

=== Prizes ===
The album was selected for the 2018 Latin Grammy Awards, being nominated in the category of best MPB album. At a ceremony held at the MGM Grand Garden Arena in Las Vegas, the album was surpassed by Caravanas, by Chico Buarque, also released by the record label Biscoito Fino.

Year	Award	Category	Venue	Result	Ref.
2018	Latin Grammy Award	Best MPB Album	MGM Grand Garden Arena, Las Vegas, Nevada, United States	Nominee	

== Musicians ==
The following musicians and artists performed on this album:

- Edu Lobo: vocals (tracks 1, 5, 7, 10);
- Dori Caymmi: vocals and acoustic guitar (tracks 2, 4, 9, 11);
- Marcos Valle: vocals and piano (tracks 3, 6, 8, 12);
- Lula Galvão: acoustic guitar (tracks 1, 3, 5, 6, 7, 8, 10, 12);
- Cristóvão Bastos: piano (tracks 1, 2, 4, 5, 7, 9, 10, 11);
- Jorge Helder: double bass (tracks 1–12);
- Jurim Moreira: drums (tracks 1–12);
- Mingo Araújo: percussion (tracks 5, 7, 10);
- Idriss Boudrioua: alto saxophone (tracks 1, 2, 5, 7, 9, 10);
- Danilo Sinna: alto saxophone (12); flute (tracks 2, 3, 6, 8, 9);
- Mauro Senise: alto saxophone (track 1); flute (tracks 2, 5, 7, 9, 10);
- Marcelo Martins: tenor saxophone (tracks 2, 9, 12); flute (tracks 3, 6, 8);
- Jessé Sadoc: flugelhorn (tracks 3, 5, 6, 7, 8, 10); trumpet (tracks 1, 12);
- Aldivas Ayres: trombone (tracks 3, 6, 8, 12);
- Hugo Pilger: cello (tracks 4, 6, 11);
- Marcio Mallard: cello (tracks 4, 6, 11);
- Marcus Ribeiro: cello (tracks 4, 6, 11);
- Mateus Ceccato: cello (tracks 4, 6, 11);
- Ricardo Amado: violin (track 6);
- Andreia Carizzi: violin (track 6);
- Marco Catto: viola (track 6);

Arrangements:

- Cristóvão Bastos (tracks 1, 5, 7, 10);
- Dori Caymmi (tracks 2, 4, 9, 11);
- Marcos Valle and Jessé Sadoc (tracks 3, 6, 8, 12).
