= Latin Grammy Award for Best MPB Album =

Latin Grammy Award category

- Awarded for: Vocal or instrumental Musica Popular Brasileira albums containing at least 51% playing time of newly recorded material. For Solo artists, duos or groups.
- Country: United States
- Presented by: The Latin Recording Academy
- First award: 2000
- Currently held by: Luedji Luna for Um Mar Pra Cada Um (2025)
- Website: latingrammy.com

The Latin Grammy Award for Best MPB Album is an honor presented annually at the Latin Grammy Awards, a ceremony that recognizes excellence and creates a wider awareness of cultural diversity and contributions of Latin recording artists in the United States and internationally. According to the category description guide for the 13th Latin Grammy Awards, the award is for vocal or instrumental Musica Popular Brasileira albums containing at least 51% playing time of newly recorded material, and is awarded to solo artists, duos or groups. From 2000 to 2023, the category was presented as Best MPB Album (Música Popular Brasileira), being renamed to its current name in 2024.

The albums, Livro by Caetano Veloso (2000), Maria Rita by Maria Rita (2004), Regência: Vince Mendoza by Ivan Lins and The Metropole Orchestra (2009) and Especial Ivete, Gil E Caetano by Caetano Veloso, Gilberto Gil and Ivete Sangalo (2012) were nominated for Album of the Year, but didn't win.

The album Livro by Caetano Veloso won this award in 2000 and the Grammy Award for Best World Music Album in the same year.

Cantando Histórias by Ivan Lins became the first Brazilian album and only Portuguese language album to win this award and Album of the Year in 2005. The same year, Eletracústico by Gilberto Gil lost this award to Ivan Lins' album, but won the Grammy Award for Best Contemporary World Music Album in 2006. With her win in 2022, Liniker became the first trans artist to win a Latin Grammy Award.

== Recipients ==
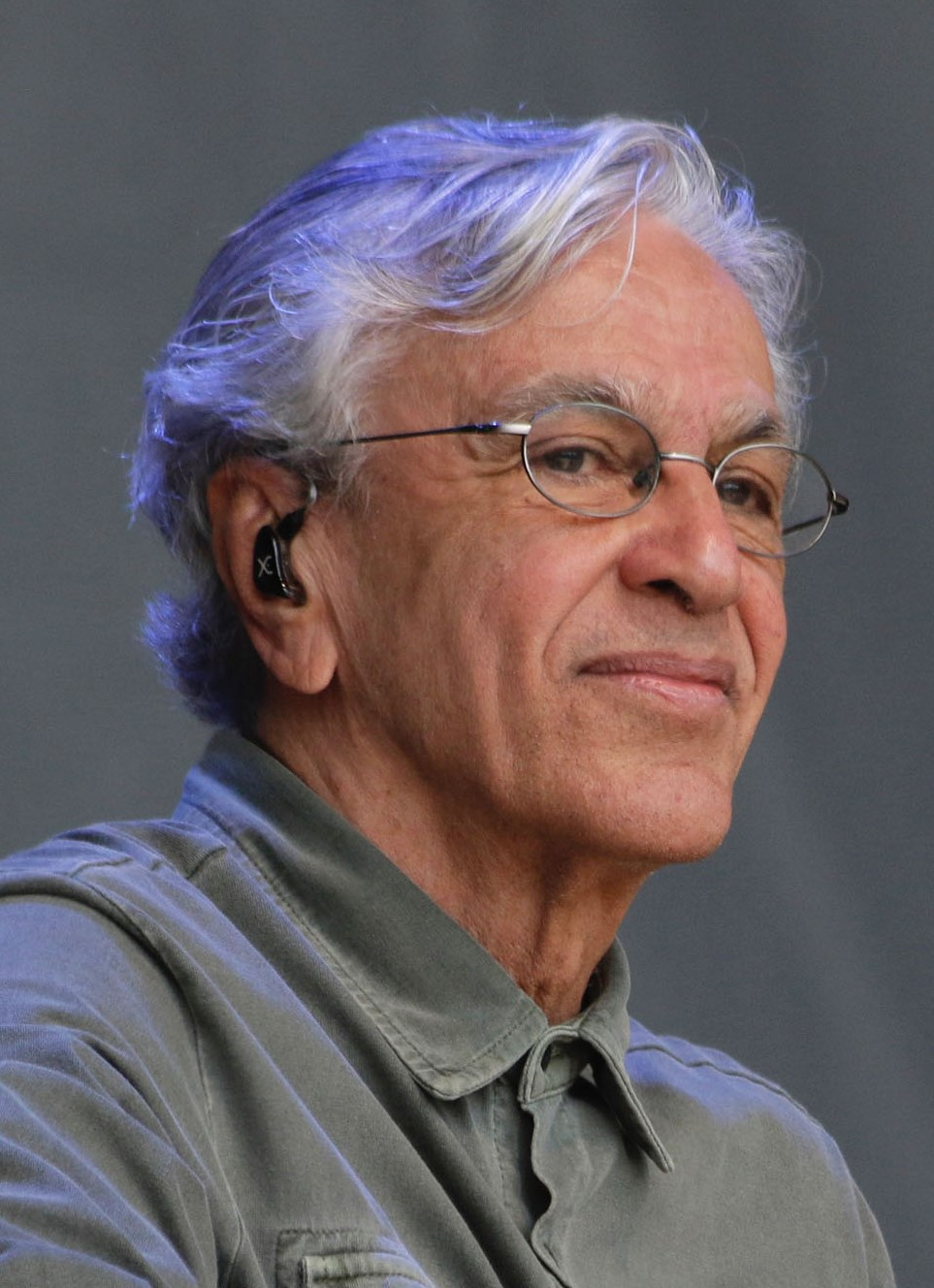
Caetano Veloso was the first winner of this award in 2000 for Livro. He is the artist with most wins with three wins as well as the most nominated with eight nominations.

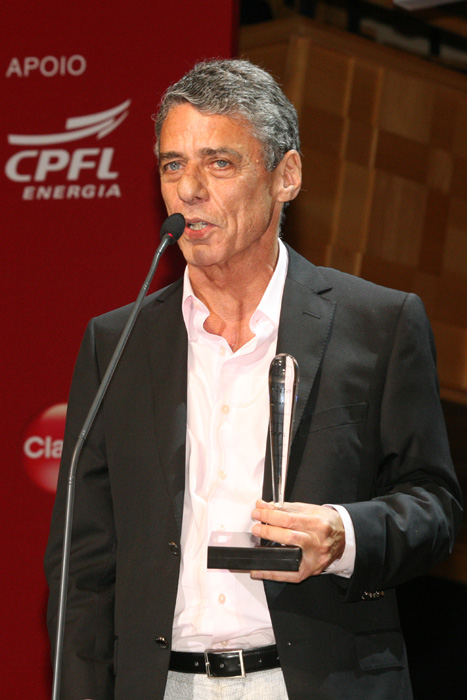
Chico Buarque won in 2002 alongside Edu Lobo for Cambaio and in 2018 for Caravanas.

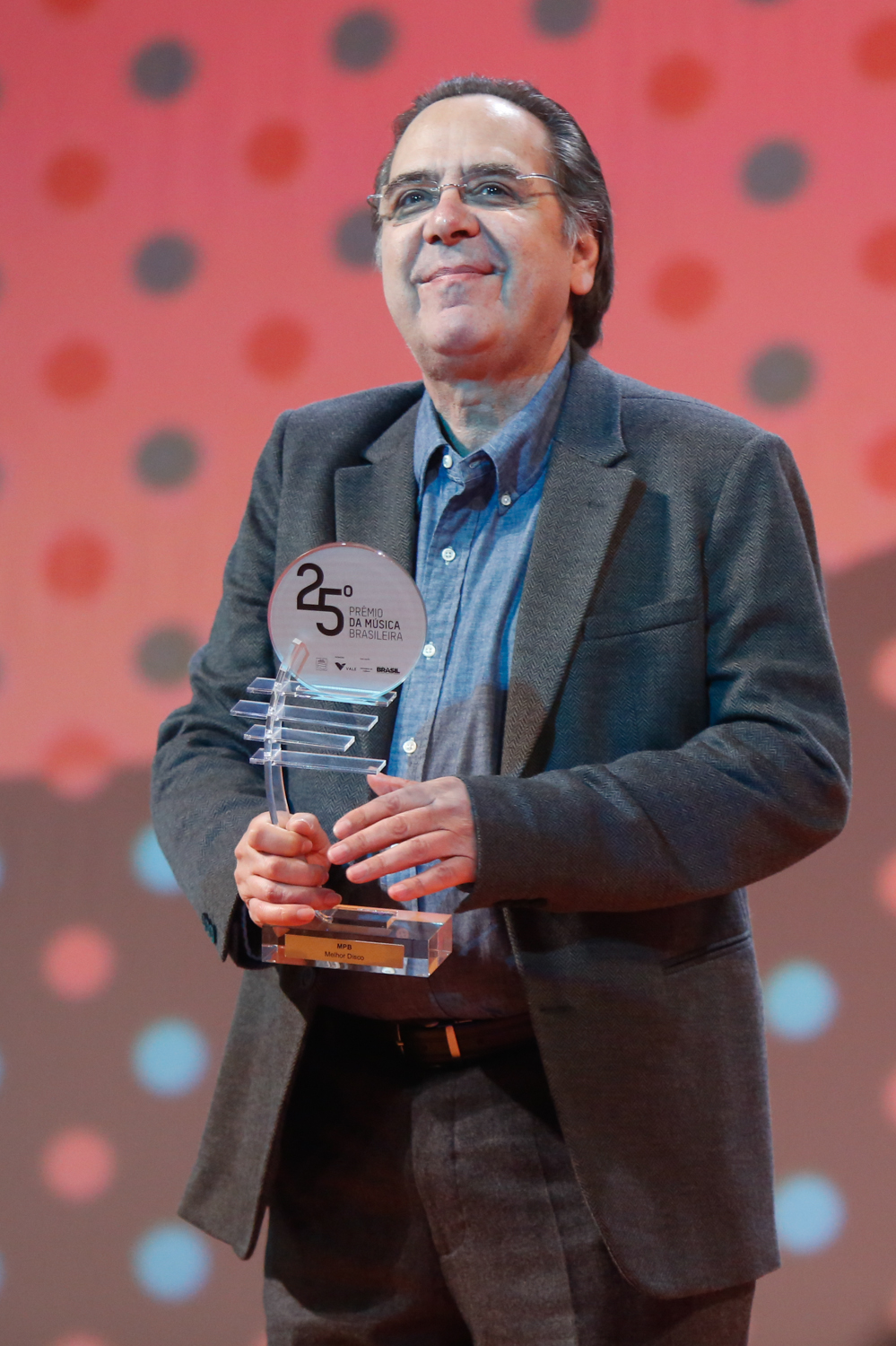
Edu Lobo won for Cambaio with Chico Buarque in 2002 and for Dos Navegantes alongside Romero Lubambo and Mauro Senise in 2017.

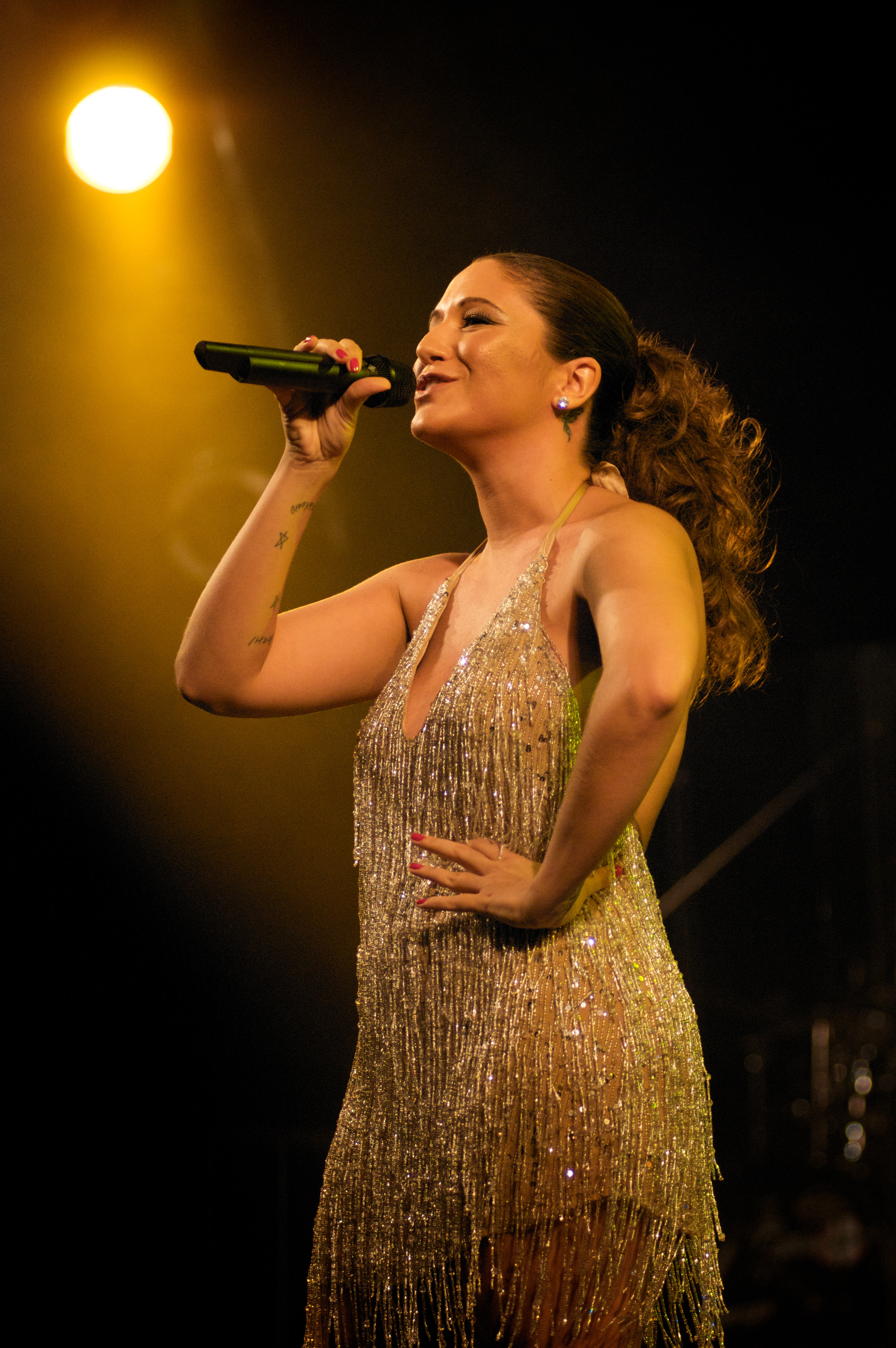
Three-time winner Maria Rita. She was the first female recipient of the award.

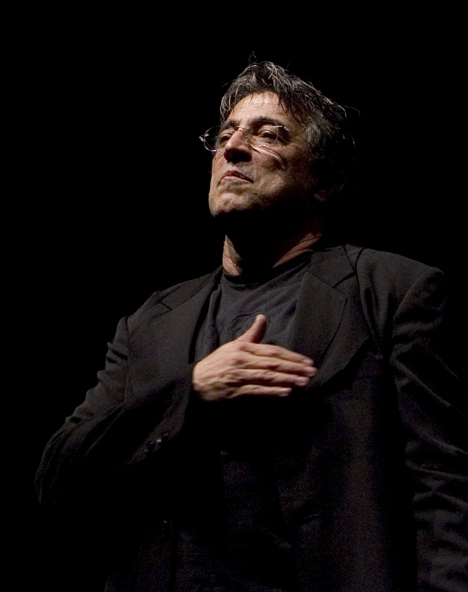
Three-time winner Ivan Lins.

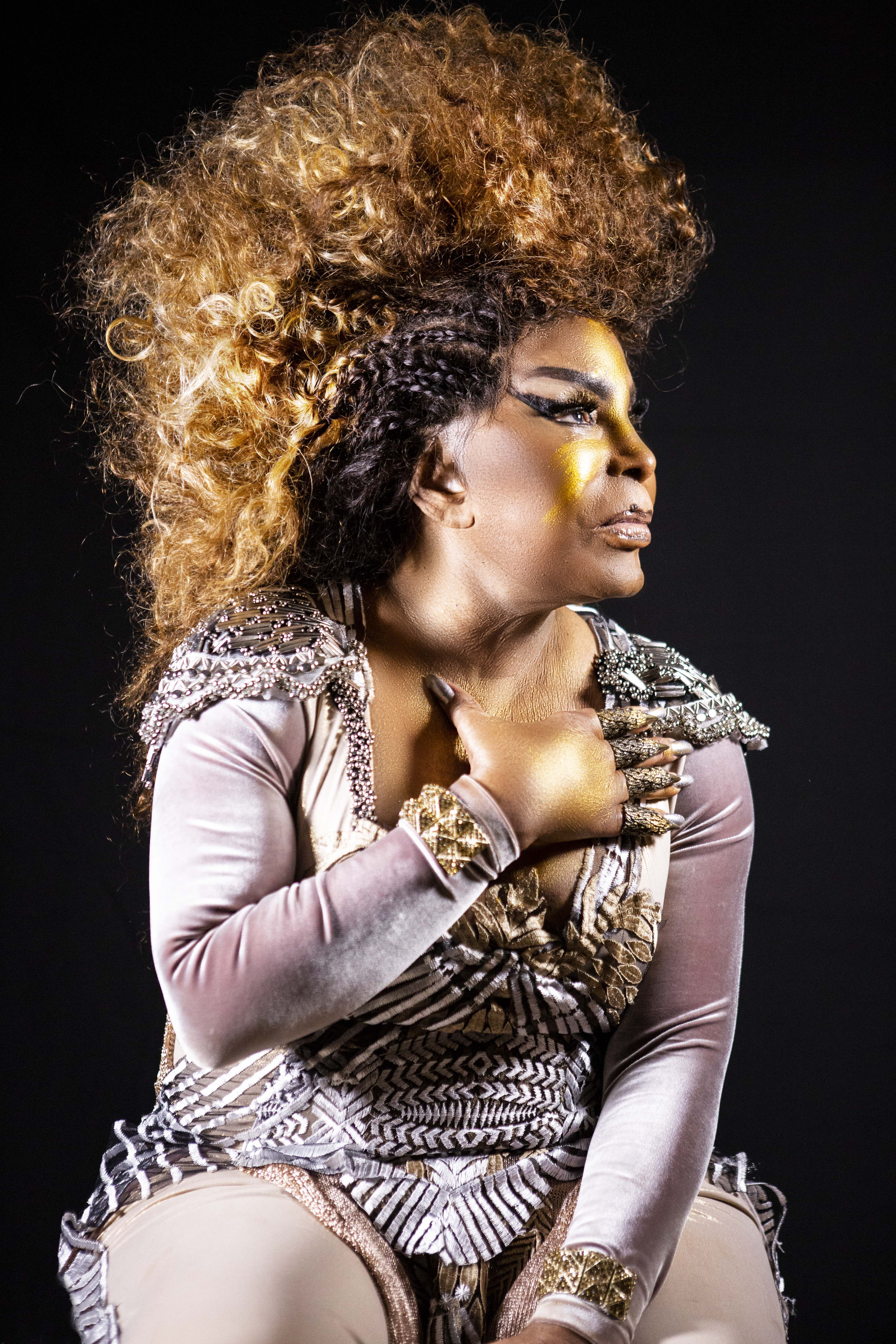
Elza Soares won in 2016 for A Mulher do Fim do Mundo.

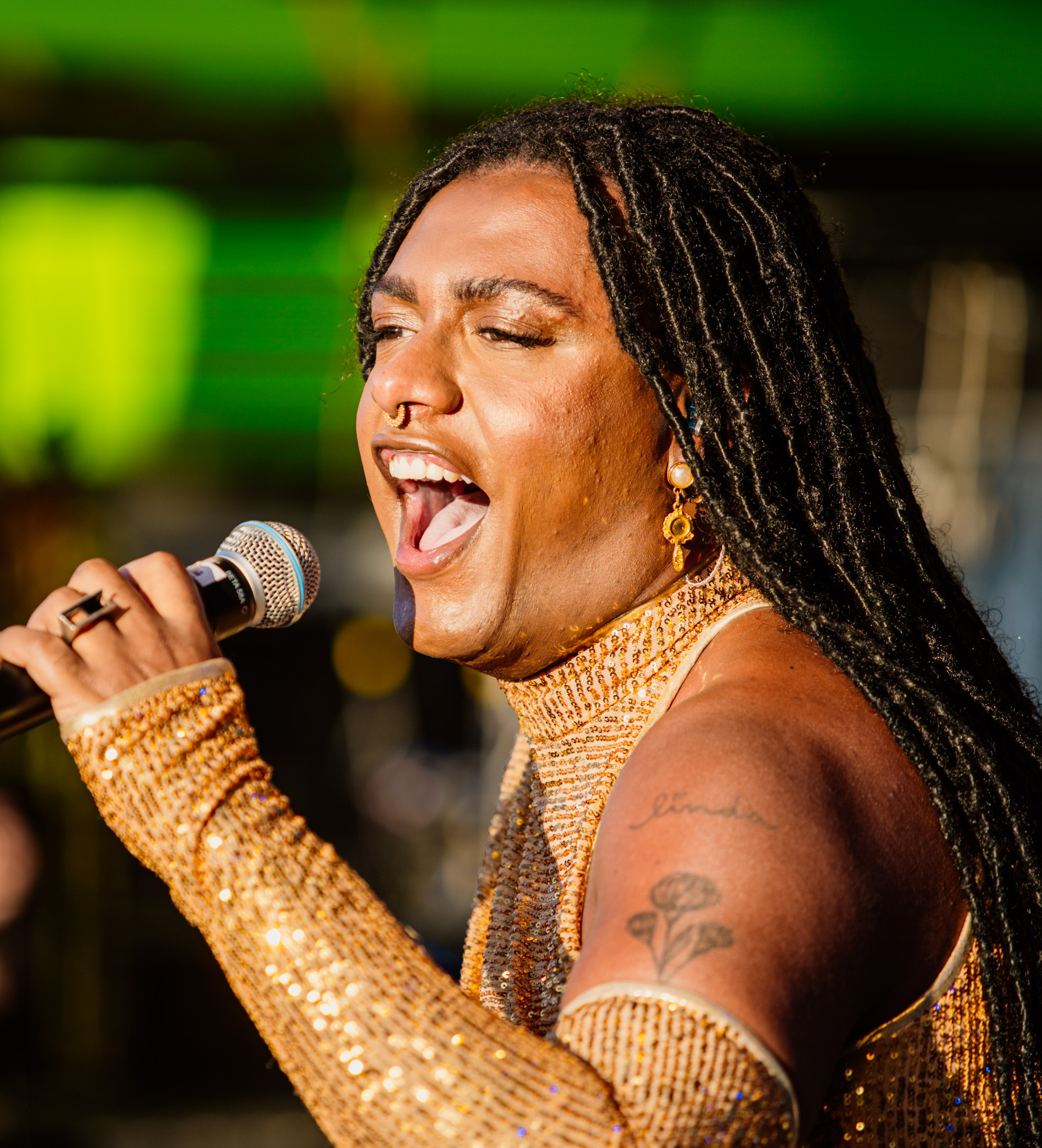
Liniker won in 2022 for Indigo Borboleta Anil becoming the first trans artist to win a Latin Grammy Award.

Year	Performing artist(s)	Work	Nominees	Ref.
2000	Caetano Veloso	Livro	Maria Bethânia – A força que nunca seca; Gilberto Gil – O sol de Oslo; Joyce – Astronauta: Canções de Elis; Lenine – Na Pressão	
2001	Caetano Veloso	Noites Do Norte	Bebel Gilberto – Tanto Tempo; Guinga – Suíte Leopoldina; Ney Matogrosso – Batuque; Emílio Santiago – Bossa Nova	
2002	Chico Buarque and Edu Lobo	Cambaio	Dori Caymmi – Influencias; Celso Fonseca and Ronaldo Bastos – Juventude/Slow Motion Bossa Nova; Guinga – Cine Baronesa; Ed Motta – Dwitza	
2003	Caetano Veloso and Jorge Mautner	Eu não peço desculpa	Maria Bethânia – Maricotinha Ao Vivo; João Bosco – Malabaristas Do Sinal Vermelho; Dori Caymmi – Contemporâneos; Gal Costa – Gal Bossa Tropical; Elza Soares – Do Cóccix Até O Pescoço	
2004	Maria Rita	Maria Rita	Maria Bethânia – Brasileirinho; Gal Costa – Todas As Coisas e Eu; Guinga – Noturno Copacabana; Cesar Camargo Mariano and Pedro Mariano – Piano y Voz	
2005	Ivan Lins	Cantando Histórias	Gilberto Gil – Eletracústico; João Gilberto – João Gilberto in Tokyo; Toninho Horta – Com o Pé No Forró; Joyce – Banda Maluca	
2006	Maria Rita	Segundo	João Bosco – Obrigado, Gente!; Ana Carolina and Seu Jorge – Ana e Jorge Ao Vivo; Gal Costa – Hoje; Jane Duboc – Uma Voz... Uma Paixão; Simone – Simone – Ao Vivo	
2007	Leny Andrade and Cesar Camargo Mariano	Ao Vivo	Gal Costa – Ao Vivo; Guinga – Casa De Villa; Zé Ramalho – Parceria dos Viajantes; Monica Salmaso – Noites De Gala, Samba Na Rua	
2008	Seu Jorge	América Brasil o Disco	Maria Bethânia – Dentro Do Mar Tem Rio - Ao Vivo; Chico Buarque – Chico Buarque Carioca - Ao Vivo; Omara Portuondo and Maria Bethânia – Omara Portuondo e Maria Bethânia; Roberta Sá – Que Belo Estranho Dia Pra Se Ter Alegria; Caetano Veloso – Multishow Ao Vivo Cê	
2009	Ivan Lins and The Metropole Orchestra	Regência: Vince Mendoza	Zeca Baleiro – O Coração Do Homem-Bomba, Vol. 1; Zélia Duncan – Pelo Sabor Do Gesto; Jorge Vercillo – Trem Da Minha Vida-Ao Vivo; Wanderléa – Nova Estação	
2010	Gilberto Gil	Banda Dois	João Bosco – Não Vou Pro Céu, Mas Já Não Vivo no Chão; Dori Caymmi – Inner World; Toninho Horta – Toninho Horta - Harmonia & Vozes; Joyce – Slow Music; Jorge Vercillo – D.N.A.	
2011	Djavan	Ária	Milton Nascimento – E A Gente Sonhando; Mônica Salmaso – Alma Lírica Brasileira; Caetano Veloso and Maria Gadú – Multishow Ao Vivo Caetano e Maria Gadú; Yeahwon – Yeahwon	
2012	Caetano Veloso, Gilberto Gil and Ivete Sangalo	Especial Ivete, Gil E Caetano	Maria Bethânia – Oásis de Bethânia; João Bosco – João Bosco 40 Anos Depois; Ivan Lins – Amorágio; Marisa Monte – O Que Você Quer Saber de Verdade; Leila Pinheiro – Raiz; Maria Rita – Elo	
2013	Maria Rita	Redescobrir - Ao Vivo	Gilberto Gil – Concerto De Cordas & Máquinas De Ritmo; Edu Lobo – Edu Lobo & Metropole Orkest; Various Artists; Thiago Marques Luiz (producer) – Herivelto Martins - 100 Anos; Jorge Vercillo – Luar De Sol - Ao Vivo No Ceará	
2014	Marisa Monte	Verdade, Uma Ilusão	Zeca Baleiro – Calma Aí, Coração - Ao Vivo; Jeneci – De Graça; Ivan Lins & InventaRio – InventaRio Encontra Ivan Lins; Nana, Dori and Danilo – Caymmi	
2015	Ivan Lins	América, Brasil	Maria Bethânia – Meus Quintais; Various Artists; Mario Adnet and Dorival Caymmi (producers) – Centenário Caymmi; Maria Gadú – Guelã; Lenine – Carbono	
2016	Elza Soares	A Mulher do Fim do Mundo	Dani Black – Dilúvio; Roberta Campos – Todo Caminho é Sorte; Celso Fonseca – Like Nice; Roberta Sá – Delírio	
2017	Edu Lobo, Romero Lubambo & Mauro Senise	Dos Navegantes	Alexandre Pires – DNA Musical; Silva – Silva Canta Marisa; António Zambujo – Até Pensei Que Fosse Minha; Zanna – Zanna	
2018	Chico Buarque	Caravanas	João Bosco – Mano Que Zuera; Edu Lobo, Dori Caymmi & Marcos Valle – Edu, Dori & Marcos; Vitor Ramil – Campos Neutrais; Elza Soares – Deus é Mulher	
2019	Gilberto Gil	Ok Ok Ok	Zeca Baleiro – O Amor no Caos, Vol. 1; Nana Caymmi – Canta Tito Madi; Zélia Duncan – Tudo é Um; Delia Fischer – Tempo Mínimo; Jards Macalé – Besta Fera	
2020	Toninho Horta & Orquestra Fantasma	Belo Horizonte	Zeca Baleiro – O Amor no Caos, Vol. 2; Ney Matogrosso – Bloco Na Rua (Deluxe); Elza Soares – Planeta Fome; Caetano Veloso and Ivan Sacerdote – Caetano Veloso & Ivan Sacerdote	
2021	Zeca Baleiro	Canções D'Além Mar	Delia Fischer – Hoje; Thiago Holanda – Tempo de Viver; Luedji Luna – Bom Mesmo É Estar Debaixo D'Água; Zé Manoel – Do Meu Coração Nu	
2022	Liniker	Indigo Borboleta Anil	Chico Chico – Pomares; João Donato and Jards Macalé – Síntese do Lance; Ney Matogrosso – Nu Com a Minha Música; Marisa Monte – Portas; Caetano Veloso – Meu Coco	
2023	João Donato	Serotonina	Tim Bernardes – Mil Coisas Invisíveis; Vanessa da Mata – Vem Doce; Djavan – D; Tiago Iorc – Daramô	
2024	Jota.Pê	Se o Meu Peito Fosse o Mundo	Djavan – D Ao Vivo Maceió; Marisa Monte – Portas (Ao Vivo); Milton Nascimento & Chitãozinho & Xororó – Outros Cantos; Elza Soares – No Tempo da Intolerância	
2025	Luedji Luna	Um Mar Pra Cada Um	5 A Seco – Sentido; Dora Morelenbaum – Pique; Rachel Reis – Divina Casca; Rubel – Beleza. Mas Agora A Gente Faz O Que Com Isso?	
