= Pique (album) =

2024 studio album by Dora Morelenbaum

Studio album by Dora Morelenbaum
- Released: October 18, 2024
- Recorded: April–December 2023
- Studios: Wolf Estúdio, Santa Teresa, Rio de Janeiro
- Genre: Brazilian Popular Music • sophisti-pop
- Length: 34:27
- Label: Mr Bongo • Coala Records
- Producer: Ana Frango Elétrico

Pique (stylized as: PIQUE) is the debut album by Brazilian singer Dora Morelenbaum, released by Coala Records on October 18, 2024.

== Background ==
After leaving the band Bala Desejo, singer Dora Morelenbaum began her solo career. Committed to the band, she released the Extended play (EP) Do a Dó with Tom Veloso and also João with Felipe El in tribute to musician Di Melo. Produced by Ana Frango Elétrico and released by Coala Records, responsible for the Coala festival in São Paulo, and Mr Bongo, the album Pique was released on October 18, 2024.

The album was recorded at Wolf Studio, located in the Santa Teresa neighborhood of Rio de Janeiro, between April and December 2023. In her debut work as a solo artist, Dora mixed elements of Brazilian popular music, jazz, and soul. In an interview with journalist Silvio Essinger from the Rio de Janeiro newspaper O Globo, Dora stated that the release of Pique is "the artist's confessed attempt to promote 'communication through the language of sound". For Augusto Diniz, from CartaCapital magazine, Dora stated that among her influences for the album are Erykah Badu, João Donato, and PJ Morton.

== Release ==
The album was released on streaming platforms on October 18, 2024.

=== Tour ===
As part of the album launch, Dora held a series of concerts to promote the album. The concerts included Brasília, São Paulo, Rio de Janeiro, Salvador, Olinda, Porto Alegre, and João Pessoa. There was also an international tour with concerts in London, England; Hamburg, Germany; Lisbon, Portugal; Ghent, Belgium; Paris, France; Barcelona, Spain; and Bogotá, Colombia.

== Reception ==
=== Critical ===
Journalist and music critic Mauro Ferreira gave the album three and a half stars out of five on his blog on G1, noting that "Dora Morelenbaum is on track with an album made with the youthful energy of the artist's band, and in this sense, Pique is in tune with the aforementioned predecessor EP Vento de beirada. This is a merit, but also a problem. Because Dora Morelenbaum, like the talented Zé Ibarra, has already left the impression of being better and more self-sufficient than most of this group..."

Leonardo Lichote of the Folha de S.Paulo newspaper made a positive comment about the album and added "the elegant sensuality, the 'cool' warmth that sets the tone." Julinho Bittencourt of Fórum magazine praised the work, saying, "It is a young and modern album with its own accent. [...] It's worth every note, every color, every second."

=== Accolades ===
In 2025, Pique was nominated for a Latin Grammy Award in the category of Best Afro-Portuguese-Brazilian Music Album. At a ceremony held at the MGM Grand Garden Arena in Las Vegas, United States, the album was surpassed by singer Luedji Luna's album Um Mar Pra Cada Um.

Year	Award	Category	Venue	Result	Ref.
2025	Latin Grammy Award	Grammy Award for Best MPB Album	MGM Grand Garden Arena, Las Vegas, Nevada, US	Nominated	

== Track listing ==
Track listing
No.	Title	Writer(s)	Length
1.	"Não vou te esquecer"	Tom Veloso and Dora Morelenbaum	3:26
2.	"Venha comigo"	Sophia Chablau	3:45
3.	"Sim, não"	Dora Morelenbaum	2:34
4.	"Essa confusão"	Dora Morelenbaum and Zé Ibarra	4:30
5.	"A melhor saída"	Tom Veloso	4:03
6.	"Caco"	Dora Morelenbaum and Zé Ibarra	3:06
7.	"VW blue"	Dora Morelenbaum	1:45
8.	"Petricor"	Tom Veloso and Dora Morelenbaum	4:14
9.	"Pique"	Dora Morelenbaum and Tom Veloso	1:09
10.	"Talvez "As canções""	Dora Morelenbaum and Tom Veloso	3:31
11.	"Nem te procurar"	Tom Veloso and Dora Morelenbaum	2:24
Total length:			34:27

== Musicians ==
The following musicians worked on the album:

- Dora Morelenbaum: vocals, backing vocals, synth, piano, Rhodes, whistling, acoustic guitar, wind instrument arrangement, string arrangement;
- Alberto Continentino: bass, vibraphone arrangement;
- Guilherme Lirio: guitar, piano, whistling;
- Haroldo Eiras: guitar;
- Josyara: acoustic guitar;
- Zé Ibarra: acoustic guitar;
- Luiz Otávio: Rhodes piano, Hammond organ;
- Sérgio Machado: drums, electronic drums;
- Marcelo Costa: percussion;
- Diogo Gomes: trumpet, flugelhorn, wind instrument arrangement;
- Marlon Sette: trombone;
- Jorge Continentino: saxophone, flute;
- Arthur Dutra: vibraphone;
- Aline Gonçalves: clarinet, flute;
- Janaína Perotto: English horn;
