= Sergio Mendes Presents Lobo =

Studio album by Edu Lobo
- Released: April 1971
- Recorded: 1970
- Genre: Bossa nova, MPB, Psychedelic pop, Samba jazz
- Length: 32:58
- Label: A&M SP3035
- Producer: Sergio Mendes

Edu Lobo chronology
| Edu Canta Zumbi (1968) | Sergio Mendes Presents Lobo (1971) | Cantiga de longe (1970) |

Sergio Mendes Presents Lobo is a 1971 album by Edu Lobo, produced by Sergio Mendes.

== Reception ==
Professional ratings
Review scores
| Source | Rating |
|---|---|
| Allmusic | 5/5 stars |

Billboard magazine reviewed the album in their April 24, 1971 issue and wrote that ""To Say Goodbye" and "Ponterio" are outstanding vocals".

Richard S. Ginnell reviewed the reissue of the album for Allmusic and wrote that the album "overflows with cunningly devised, first-class tunes" and that Lobo excelled at the use of "sharp scatted syllables" in place of lyrics on some of the songs. Ginnell highlighted Hermeto Pascoal's "playful and enigmatic electric piano and flute multiphonics" and the "multifaceted percussion talents" of Airto Moreira. Ginnell concluded that "Collectors of Brazilian jazz should seek this one out; it is absolutely essential".

== Track listing ==
1. "Zanzibar" (Edu Lobo) – 4:01
2. "Ponteio" (Lobo) – 3:03
3. "Even Now" (Lani Hall, Lobo) – 2:13
4. "Crystal Illusions" (Hall, Lobo) – 6:09
5. "Casa Forte" (Lobo) – 3:39
6. "Jangada" (Lobo) – 2:25
7. "Sharp Tongue" (Hermeto Pascoal) – 2:16
8. "To Say Goodbye" (Hall, Lobo, Torquato Neto) – 4:42
9. "Hey Jude" (John Lennon, Paul McCartney) – 4:14

== Personnel ==
- Edu Lobo – arranger, conductor, guitar, vocals
- Oscar Castro-Neves – guitar
- Hermeto Pascoal – arranger, flute, piano, electric piano
- Gracinha Leporace – vocals
- Norm Herzberg – bassoon
- Ronald Cooper, Ray Kramer, Kurt Reher, Eleanor Slatkin – cello
- Sebastião Neto – double bass
- Airto Moreira – percussion
- Claudio Slon – drums
- Sergio Mendes – arranger, producer

=== Production ===
- Leonard Feather, Douglas T. Stewart – liner notes
- Joe Foster – producer, recreation
- That Hound – mastering
- Isthetic – design
- Hollis King – art direction
- Jim McCrary, Guy Webster – cover photography
- Andy Morten – artwork, design
- Nick Robbins – recreation
