= Joyce (singer) =

Brazilian singer-songwriter and guitarist

Joyce Moreno
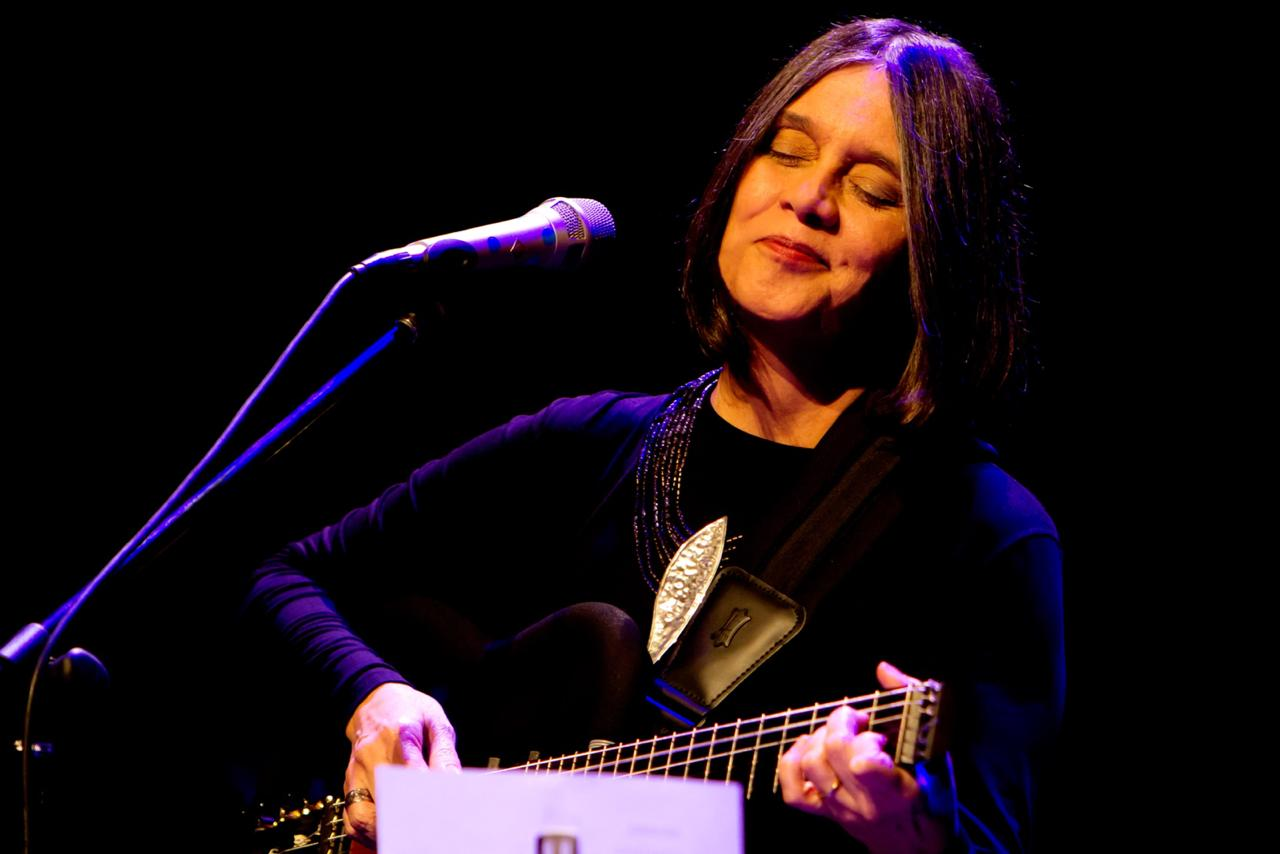
- Moreno performing in 2010

Background information
- Born: Joyce Silveira Palhano de Jesus; 31 January 1948 (age 78)
- Origin: Rio de Janeiro, Brazil
- Genres: Jazz, MPB, bossa nova
- Occupations: Singer, songwriter, guitarist, arranger
- Instruments: Singing, guitar
- Years active: 1968–present
- Label: Far Out Recordings
- Website: joycemoreno.com

Joyce Moreno (born 31 January 1948), commonly known as Joyce (Brazilian Portuguese: [ˈʒojsi]), is a Brazilian singer-songwriter and guitarist.

The first record of her work as a singer dates back to 1964, when she participated in a vocal quartet in a studio recording of the album Sambacana, by Pacífico Mascarenhas. Four years later, she released her first solo album, Joyce, on the Philips label, signing alone the authorship of five of the ten songs on the album, in addition to a partnership with musician Jards Macalé. She has since produced 45 more discs and two DVDs, has written nearly 400 songs, and also has four nominations for the Latin Grammy Awards (2000, 2004, 2005 and 2010). Since the beginning of her career, her trademarks have been a feminine language in the first person and her guitar skills. As a composer, Joyce Moreno has songs recorded by nearly all the greatest names in Música popular brasileira—including Elis Regina, Maria Bethânia, Gal Costa, Milton Nascimento, Edu Lobo and Elizeth Cardoso—and by such foreign artists as Annie Lennox, Omara Portuondo, Claus Ogerman, the Black Eyed Peas, Gerry Mulligan, and Wallace Roney. Her creations are also featured in two film soundtracks: Robert Altman's 1992 The Player and Robert Luketic's Legally Blonde. She participated on the soundtrack of Japanese anime series Wolf's Rain, for which her work was included as part of the official soundtrack.

== Early childhood ==
Moreno's paternal grandfather was a Swede, from Karlskrona, who moved to Copenhagen and married a Danish woman. Their son, Joyce's father, moved from Denmark to Brazil and married a Brazilian woman, Joyce's mother.

== Career in Brazil ==
In Brazil, she has become initially known in 1967, a year before releasing her first album, when she performed her song Me Disseram at the II International Song Festival (RJ), but the peak of her popularity happened in the early 1980s, when she presented "Clareana", a song she wrote dedicated to her two infant daughters, at TV Globo's Brazilian Popular Music Festival. The song was a hit across the country and appeared on her 1980 album Feminina, which also included other hits such as the title tune ("Feminina"), "Mistérios", "Da Cor Brasileira" and "Essa Mulher". From then on, she has released a series of albums with her own original compositions, recorded in Brazil and abroad; albums dedicated to the works of Vinicius de Moraes, her artistic godfather, Tom Jobim, Elis Regina and Dorival Caymmi; and many recordings in partnership with other musicians.

== International career ==
Still in the 1980s, she had a first presence on the international circuit, when, replacing guitarist Toquinho, she performed with the poet Vinicius de Moraes on tours throughout Latin America and Europe. It was a period in which she recorded albums in Italy and the United States, during a season of concerts in New York, in 1977. In 1985, she was invited to participate in the Youth Festival, in Moscow, and the Yamaha Festival, in Japan, starting a solid career abroad that involves annual tours in several countries in Europe, Japan, the United States and Canada - a schedule that reconciles with performances in Brazil.

In 2004, she was awarded in the United States with the Lifetime Achievement International Press Award, given by the press to personalities who disseminate a positive image of their countries abroad. Three years earlier, for the same reason, she had received the key to the city of Johnstown, Pennsylvania (US). In 2015 she entered the list of honored artists by the Berklee College of Music, in Boston, US, having her work arranged and performed by graduates and presented in a large concert at the university's theater. At the time, she received honors from the Boston City Council and the Massachusetts State Assembly for her contribution to Brazilian culture and for promoting this culture internationally. Joyce is also an educator, conducting workshops and master classes about her music and MPB at universities in several countries.

In the early 1990s, her work became increasingly popular among London DJs, which led to new audiences around the world in the acid jazz scene.

It was in the debut edition of the Latin Grammy, in 2000, that Joyce Moreno received her first award nomination, in the category Best Brazilian Music CD, with the album Astronauta: Canções de Elis, a tribute to Elis Regina recorded in 1998, in New York. Four years later, it was the turn of the samba A Banda Maluca to appear among the candidates for the award for Best Song in the Portuguese Language. In 2005, the CD Banda Maluca was nominated in the Best Brazilian Popular Music Album category. The fourth nomination for the Latin Grammy, also for best Brazilian music CD, occurred in 2010, with her album Slow Music.

== As a writer and television personality ==
As a journalist who graduated in the late 1960s, in 1997 Moreno published the book Fotografei Você na Minha Rolleiflex, which brought together stories experienced by the artist behind the scenes of Brazilian popular music. Due to the repercussion of this work, between 1998 and 2000, she started to sign a weekly chronicle in the Rio newspaper O Dia. In addition, for ten years (2006-2016) she wrote about life experience, travel and music in her blog 'Other Bossas'.

Soon after publishing her book, she started to create and present television programs for MultiRio, the public TV channel of the City of Rio de Janeiro. In 1999, she released Cantos do Rio ("Rio Corners"), a series in which she mapped the city and its music, interviewing composers and performers in their neighborhoods of reference and musical inspiration. In 2010 it was the turn of the series No Compasso da História (“In The Beat of History”): 15 documentaries in which the History of Brazil is told through MPB songs. Two years later, the project Pequenos Notáveis (“Remarkable Kids”) was presented, in which he addressed the childhood of some of the greatest composers of Brazilian music.

== Second book and later works ==
In November 2020, Joyce published Aquelas Coisas Todas, her second book of memoirs, edited in two parts. Part One is the updated version of Fotografei Você na Minha Rolleiflex, while in Part Two, Tudo é uma Canção, the artist presents new stories based on the idea that MPB "has an answer for everything". In a report about the release, the Estado de Minas newspaper highlighted: "Manifestations against the dictatorship, travels, festivals, growing musical movements, such as bossa nova and Tropicália, misunderstandings and confusions between artists that would eventually go down in history. When something like this happened, Joyce Moreno was there".

The book had great repercussion in the national press and was the basis of a four-chapter miniseries presented on SESC 24 de Maio's YouTube channel, in which the artist approaches texts from the book with complementary accounts and interpretations of songs related to the stories.

In parallel, the record company Pau Brasil released in digital format the album Fiz uma Viagem - Songs of Dorival Caymmi, recorded in 2016 in Norway and released in Japan the following year. In this work, Moreno interprets the songs of the composer from Bahia accompanied by bassist Rodolfo Stroeter, also producer of the album, by the pianist Hélio Alves and by Tutty Moreno, who played drums and percussion.

Joyce was married in the early 1970s to musician and composer Nelson Angelo, with whom she has two daughters who are also singers, Clara Moreno and Ana Martins. Since 1977, she has been married to drummer Tutty Moreno, father of her daughter Mina Mae (originally named as Mariana). Tutty has since then been a steady presence in Joyce's life as a stage and recording partner.

== Discography ==
- Joyce (Philips, 1968)
- Encontro Marcado (Philips, 1969)
- Nelson Angelo e Joyce (Odeon, 1972)
- Passarinho Urbano (Cetra, 1976)
- Feminina (EMI, 1980)
- Agua e Luz (EMI, 1981)
- Tardes Cariocas (Feminina, 1983)
- Saudade Do Futuro (Pointer, 1985)
- Wilson Batista (Funarte, 1985)
- Tom Jobim...Os Anos 60 (EMI, 1987)
- Negro Demais No Coracao with Vinicius de Moraes (SBK, 1988)
- Ao Vivo (EMI, 1989)
- Music Inside (Verve, 1990)
- Linguas & Amores (Verve, 1991)
- Delirios de Orfeu (Bomba, 1994)
- Revendo Amigos (EMI, 1994)
- Live at the Mojo Club (Motor Music, 1995)
- Ilha Brasil (EMI, 1996)
- Astronauta: Canções de Elis (Brasil, 1998)
- Hard Bossa (Far Out, 1999)
- Sem Voce with Toninho Horta (DiscMedi Blau, 1999)
- Tudo Bonito with João Donato (Rip Curl/Epic, 2000)
- Gafieira Moderna (Far Out, 2001)
- Just a Little Bit Crazy (Far Out, 2003)
- Bossa Duets (Sony/BMG/Epic, 2003)
- Rio-Bahia with Dori Caymmi (Victor, 2005)
- Samba Jazz & Outras Bossas (Far Out, 2007)
- Visions of Dawn with Naná Vasconcelos (Far Out, 2009)
- Slow Music (Biscoito Fino, 2009)
- Celebrating Jobim (Omagatoki 2009)
- Aquarius (Far Out, 2010)
- Rio (Far Out, 2012)
- Tudo (Far Out, 2013)
- Cool (Columbia, 2015)
- Raiz (Far Out, 2015)
- Poesia with Kenny Werner (Pirouet, 2015)
- Palavra e Som (Rambling, 2016)
- Fiz uma Viagem (Rambling, 2017)
- Argumento (Kuarup, 2018)
- 50 (Biscoito Fino, 2018)
- Brasileiras Canções (Biscoito Fino, 2022)
- Natureza with Mauricio Maestro (Far Out, 2022)
- O Mar É Mulher (Biscoito Fino, 2025)
- Joyce e Tutty Moreno, Jazz is Dead 27 (Jazz is Dead, 2026)
