= Julia Mestre =

Brazilian musician and singer-songwriter

- Born: 1996 or 1997 (age 28–29); Rio de Janeiro
- Years active: 2017–present

Julia Mestre is a Brazilian musician and singer-songwriter. She is a member of the band Bala Desejo and has released three albums as a solo artist.

== Music career ==
Mestre was born in Rio de Janeiro. Before making music she acted, and appeared in the 2014 film Confissões de Adolescente.

Mestre's first EP Desencanto was released in 2017. Her debut album Geminis was released in 2019, and she performed it at the Centro Cultural Solar de Botafogo in Rio de Janeiro in June of that year.

During the COVID-19 lockdowns, Mestre formed the band Bala Desejo with Dora Morelenbaum, Lucas Nunes, and Zé Ibarra, with whom she released an album and toured in Europe. She released her second solo album Arrepiada in 2023.

In 2025 Mestre released her third album Maravilhosamente Bem on Mr Bongo Records. Mojo described the album as "a modern twist on 1980s MPB (música popular Brasileira)". In a review for Songlines, Justin Turford wrote that "Mestre's voice is a sultry, bewitching instrument and the album is impressively produced but I can't help but find the music to be a bit too derivative."

== Discography ==
=== Albums ===
- Geminis (2019)
- Arrepiada (2023)
- Maravilhosamente Bem (2025, Mr Bongo)

=== Extended plays ===
- Desencanto (2017)

== Awards and nominations ==
Award ceremony	Year	Category	Work(s)	Result
Latin Grammy Awards	2025	Best Portuguese Language Contemporary Pop Album	Maravilhosamente Bem	Nominated
Latin Grammy Awards	2025	Best Portuguese Language Song	"Maravilhosamente Bem"	Nominated
