= Feminina =

Studio album by Joyce
- Released: 1980
- Recorded: January 1980
- Genre: MPB, Latin jazz
- Length: 34:36
- Label: EMI
- Producer: Jose Milton

Joyce chronology
| Passarinho Urbano (1976) | Feminina (1980) | Agua e Luz (1981) |

Feminina is an album by the Brazilian singer Joyce that was released by EMI in 1980.

The album includes the track "Clareana", which was written for her daughters, Clara Moreno and Ana Martins. The singer entered Festival MPB 80 and reached the finals with the song, which went on to achieve her first chart success in Brazil. "Aldeia de Ogum" was popularized as a dance track in the 1990s by Gilles Peterson.

The album cover was signed by photographer Luiz Fernando and his wife Luhli. It depicts Moreno without make up and playing her acoustic guitar. According to Moreno herself in a 2019 interview, although the guitar is not seen in the image, it is present through her look, which is the typical look of a musician to their instrument. The album logo, in which an acoustic guitar is drawn from the letter "f", became a symbol of the singer.

== Track listing ==
| No. | Title | Music | Length |
|---|---|---|---|
| 1. | "Feminina" | Joyce | 3:48 |
| 2. | "Mistérios" | Joyce, Maestro | 4:32 |
| 3. | "Clareana" | Joyce | 2:50 |
| 4. | "Banana" | Joyce | 4:16 |
| 5. | "Revendo Amigos" | Joyce | 3:20 |
| 6. | "Essa Mulher" | Joyce, Terra | 3:32 |
| 7. | "Coração de Criança" | Joyce, Leporace | 3:13 |
| 8. | "Da Cor Brasileira" | Joyce, Terra | 2:12 |
| 9. | "Aldeia de Ogum" | Joyce | 4:34 |
| 10. | "Compor" | Joyce | 2:19 |

== Personnel ==
- Joyce – vocals, classical guitar
- Mauro Senise – flute, saxophone
- Danilo Caymmi – flute
- Jorginho – flute
- Paulo Guimaraes – flute
- Helvius Vilela – piano
- Helio Delmiro – guitar
- Claudio Guimaraes – guitar
- Fernando Leporace – bass guitar, vocals
- Tutti Moreno – drums, percussion
- Lize Bravo – vocals
