= Dora Morelenbaum =

Brazilian musical artist

- Born: Rio de Janeiro, Brazil
- Genre: MPB · samba-jazz · experimental music
- Occupation: Singer · songwriter · multi-instrumentalist
- Instrument: Vocals · cello
- Years active: 2010–present

Dora Morelenbaum is a Brazilian singer, songwriter, and multi-instrumentalist. She is a founding member of the band Bala Desejo and has pursued a solo career since 2020.

== Biography ==
=== Early years and education ===
Granddaughter of Polish musician Henrique Morelenbaum, who settled in Brazil, and daughter of conductor Jaques Morelenbaum and singer Paula Morelenbaum, Dora was born into a musical environment in the city of Rio de Janeiro.

She studied music arrangement at Federal University of the State of Rio de Janeiro (UNIRIO) for three years, but with the COVID-19 pandemic, she ended up leaving the course and started working professionally with music.

=== Career ===
In 2022, she joined the Rio de Janeiro-based group Bala Desejo, alongside Julia Mestre, Lucas Nunes, and Zé Ibarra. The quartet released the album Sim Sim Sim, which won the Latin Grammy Award for Best Portuguese Language Contemporary Pop Album in the 2022 edition. With the end of the band in 2024, she began to devote herself even more to her political career.

In 2021, she released her first solo work, the EP Vento de Beirada. Her style is associated with a blend of influences from traditional Brazilian popular music with elements of samba-jazz, electronic music, and experimentalism. Her classical training and use of the cello influence a sound that combines popular and classical elements. The project was re-released in 2023 and received international critical acclaim, such as in the German magazine HHV Mag, which described Dora as "one of the most important new voices on the Brazilian scene."

In 2024, she released her first full-length album, PIQUE, which was reviewed in Brazilian cultural media outlets. The album was praised for combining elements of Brazilian music with contemporary sounds, as highlighted by Folha de S.Paulo newspaper. In 2025, the album was nominated for a Latin Grammy Award for Best MPB Album. The winner in this category was Luedji Luna with the album Um Mar Pra Cada Um.

== Prizes ==
| Year | Award | Category | Venue | Result | Note(s) | Ref. |
|---|---|---|---|---|---|---|
| 2022 | Latin Grammy Award | Best Portuguese Language Contemporary Pop Album | Mandalay Bay Events Center, Las Vegas, Nevada, United States | Won | With Bala Desejo | |
| 2025 | Latin Grammy Award | Latin Grammy Award for Best MPB Album | MGM Grand Garden Arena Paradise, Las Vegas, Nevada, United States | Nominee | With Pique album | |
