= La alta escuela =

Spanish hip hop group

La Alta Escuela
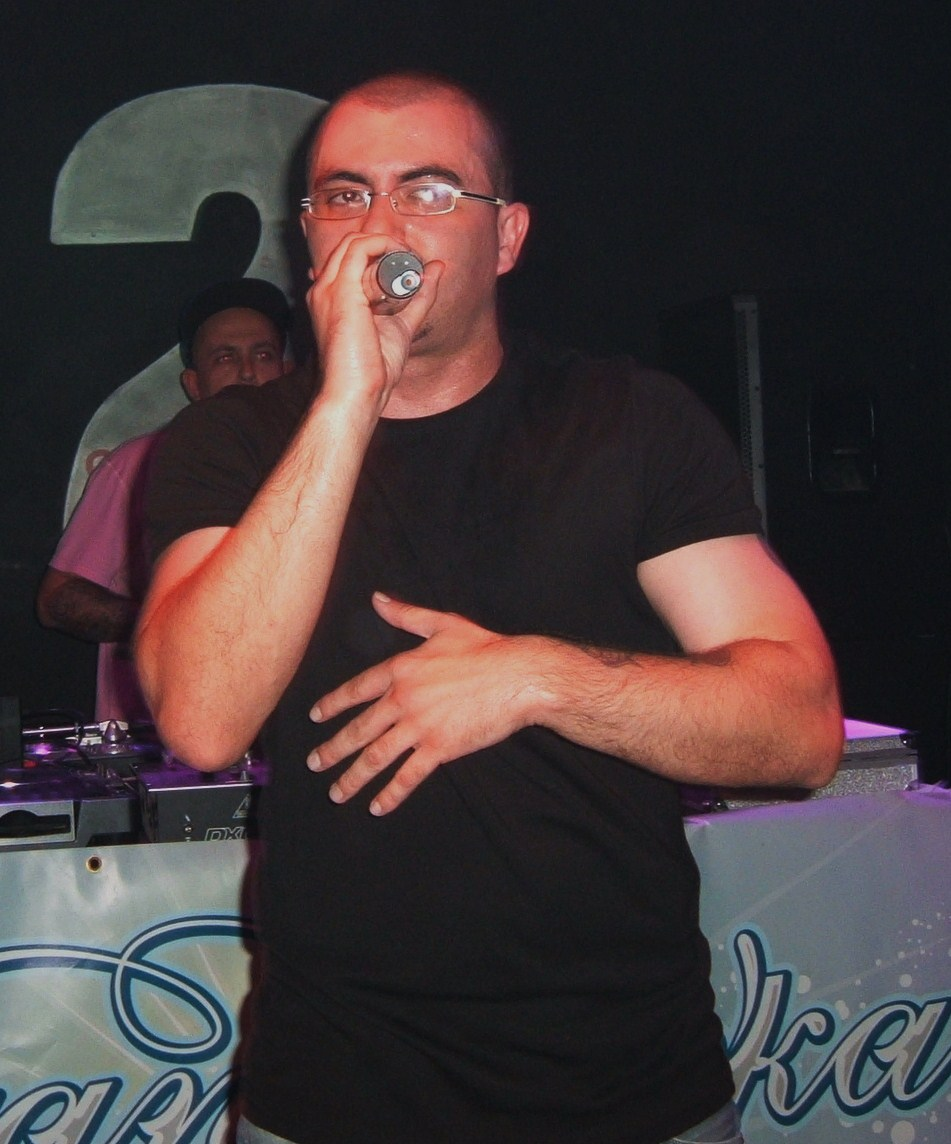
- Juaninacka is a Spanish rapper.

Background information
- Origin: Sevilla, Spain
- Genre: Rap
- Years active: 1998–2000
- Label: Flow Records
- Members: Tote King; Juaninacka; Juanma (MC); Dj Randy
- Past members: El Tralla

La Alta Escuela was a Spanish hip hop group formed in Sevilla, Spain.

The group was composed of Tote King (MC), Juaninacka (MC) together with Juanma (MC) (MC), DJ Randy (DJ) and El Tralla (MC). The latter left the band before the release of its first and only LP, En pie de vuelo (1999).

== Biography ==
They began as a group of friends making music to amuse themselves. It consisted of Tote King, Juaninacka, Juanma, and DJ Randy. They had planned to release a demo, but Acción Sánchez listened to their work and, thanks to him, they obtained the necessary contacts to turn that demo into what would become their first and only LP, En pie de vuelo (1999). Today, this work is considered by some a classic of Spanish hip-hop, despite the limited impact it had at the time.

The group dissolved, among other reasons, due to the difficulties caused by distance, which made rehearsing complicated. Nowadays, each member continues their career in hip-hop with their own projects.

=== Return ===
In November 2008, Tote King confirms that he will return to release a new album as La Alta Escuela, together with Juaninacka, Juanma (MC) y DJ Randy. Moreover, on Tote King's latest LP, there is a song called "La reunión" (recorded in collaboration with Juaninacka), whose title refers to the group's reunion. And on Juaninacka's LP 41100 Rock, there is a song titled "La alta escuela Rulez", that features all the members of the group.

In 2016, they released a new single, titled "Ready 4 War".

== Discography ==
- En pie de vuelo (lit. 'Flight stand', 'Ready to take off') – LP (Flow Records, 1999)
- "Ready 4 War" (2016)

== Solo discographies ==
=== Juaninacka ===
- "El Japones (the Japanese)" (Promo) (2002)
- "Versión EP (EP version)" (EP) (Fiebre Records, 2003)
- "Caleidoscopio (kaleidoscope)" (LP) (Fiebre Records, 2004)
- "El Hombre(The man)" (Maxi) (Fiebre Records, 2005)
- "Luces de Neón (neon lights)" (LP) (Fiebre Records, 2006)
- "Good Musica(good music)" (Maqueta) (2007)
- ¨"41100 Rock" (LP) (Boa Music) (2009)
- ¨"Canciones de Ahora y Siempre(Now and forever songs)" (Mixtape free download) (2010)
- "Hellboyz" (LP) (Producida por aisho, (2011)

==== Con Billy el Niño y Don Dinero ====
- "Otra historia de Coria...(another story of Coria)" (Maxi) (Flow Records, 2000)

=== Juanma (MC) ===
- "El que faltaba(Which Lacked" (EP) (edison naula, 2005)

=== Tote King ===
- "Big King XXL" (Maketa) (Flow Records, 2001)
- "Duermen(sleep)" (Maxi) (Yo Gano – SuperEgo, 2001)
- "Matemáticas(Math)" (Maxi) (Yo Gano – SuperEgo, 2004)
- "Música para enfermos(Music for sick)" (LP) (SuperEgo, 2004)
- "Un tipo cualquiera(Some guy)" (LP) (BOA, 2006)
- "T.O.T.E." (LP) (BOA, 2008)
- "El lado oscuro de Gandhi(The Dark side of Gandhi)" (LP) (Sony Music, 5 October 2010)

==== Con ToteKing & Shotta ====
- "Nada pa mi (nothing for me)" (Maxi) (Yo Gano – SuperEgo, 2002)
- "Tu madre es una foca(yor mother is a seal)" (LP) (Yo Gano – SuperEgo, 2002)

tengo que volver a casa (I have to go home) (coming soon)

=== Dj Randy ===
- "Un peso pesado (a heavyweight)" (2008)

==== Con Billy el Niño y Don Dinero ====
- "Otra historia de Coria...(Anothes story of Coria)" (Maxi) (Flow Records, 2000)

=== El Tralla ===
- "en la Calle(In the street)" (Maqueta) (2001)
- "La Calle En Demo(In the street demo)" (Maqueta) (2002)
- "Las Calles Hablan(the streets talks)" (Maxi Single) (Fiebre Records), (2006)

== See also ==
- Spanish hip hop
- Juaninacka
- Tote King
- Juanma (MC)
