= Delia Fischer =

Brazilian singer-songwriter (born 1964)

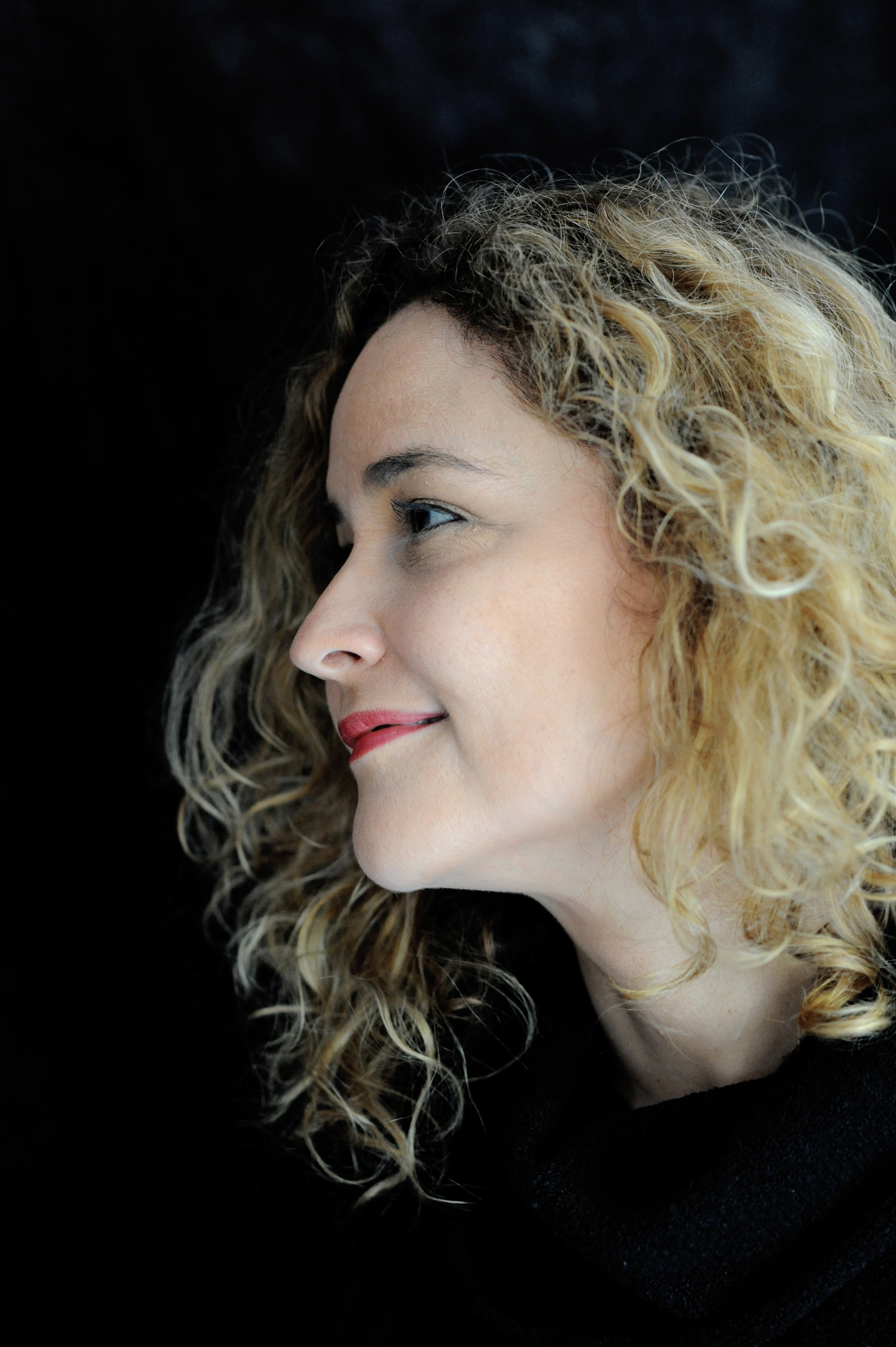
- Fischer in 2014
- Born: Delia Cristina Martins Fischer; 29 August 1964 (age 61); Rio de Janeiro, Brazil
- Occupation: Singer
- Years active: 1986–present
- Musical career
- Genres: Jazz, MPB

Delia Cristina Martins Fischer (born 29 August 1964) is a Brazilian singer-songwriter, composer, pianist, producer, and arranger.

== Life and career ==
Born in Rio de Janeiro, Fischer started studying piano in 1977, and later studied harmony and composition. In 1986 she co-founded Duo Fênix with Cláudio Dauelsberg, and the duo took part in international jazz festivals, released two albums and toured extensively. The duo disbanded in 1990, and Fischer started accompanying other artists including Ed Motta, Toninho Horta, Baby do Brasil, Robertinho Silva, Nico Assumpção and Dom Um Romão, and holding jazz improvisation and piano workshops.

In 1999, Fischer released her debut solo album, Antonio, which only consisted of instrumental songs and was also published in the North America and Europe. In 1999, she was awarded the Shell Prize for the arrangements of the musical The Beatles in a Diamond Sky. She later served as musical director for a number of other stage works, receiving a Shell Prize nomination in 2013 for Elis, a musical.

In 2010, Fischer made her singing debut with the album Presente. Her 2019 and 2021 albums Tempo Mínimo and Hoje were both nominated for a Latin Grammy Award for Best MPB Album.

== Discography ==
=== Albums ===
as Duo Fênix

- 1988 – Duo Fênix
- 1990 – Karai-eté

solo

- 1999 – Antonio
- 2010 – Presente
- 2011 – Saudações Egberto
- 2019 – Tempo Mínimo
- 2021 – Hoje
- 2023 – Andar com Gil
