= Just a Little Bit Crazy =

Studio album by Joyce and Banda Maluca
- Released: 2003
- Label: Far Out

Joyce and Banda Maluca chronology
Gafieira Moderna (2001)	Just a Little Bit Crazy (2003)

Professional ratings
Review scores
Source	Rating
AllMusic	4/5 stars
BBC	positive
The Guardian	4/5 stars

Just a Little Bit Crazy is a studio album by Brazilian bossa nova singer-songwriter Joyce and her band Banda Maluca released in 2003 on Far Out Recordings.

John L. Walters of The Guardian called it one of the best albums of 2003.

== Track listing ==
Side 1
No.	Title	Writer(s)	Length
1.	"A Banda Maluca"	Joyce	5:50
2.	"Pause, Bitte"	Joyce	1:54
3.	"A Hard Day's Night"	Lennon and McCartney	6:39
4.	"Mal em Paris"	Joyce	2:34
5.	"L'Étang"	Paul Misraki	3:16
6.	"Chuvisco"	Joyce	4:38

Side 2
No.	Title	Writer(s)	Length
1.	"Samba do Joyce"	Joyce	3:14
2.	"Os Medos"	Joyce / Rodolfo Stroeter	7:15
3.	"Galope"	Rodolfo Stroeter	4:27
4.	"For Hall"	Joyce	3:18
5.	"Cartomante"	Joyce / Rodolfo Stroeter	3:26
