= Água e Luz =

Studio album by Joyce
- Released: 1981
- Recorded: January and February 1981
- Genre: MPB, Latin jazz
- Length: 37:56
- Label: EMI, Odeon
- Producer: Jose Milton

Joyce chronology
Feminina (1980)	Água e Luz (1981)	Tardes Cariocas (1983)

Água e Luz (Water and Light) is an album by the Brazilian singer Joyce, that was released on the EMI and Odeon labels in 1981.

Like Feminina from the previous year, this recording features an all-star line up of Brazilian musicians, including the accordionist Sivuca on Samba de Gago. The track Monsieur Binot achieved chart success in Brazil. Agua e luz and Feminina are often released together on one CD.

== Track listing ==
No.	Title	Music	Length
1.	"Monsieur Binot"	Joyce	2:52
2.	"Muito Prazer"	Joyce, Maestro	3:37
3.	"Moreno"	Joyce	4:18
4.	"Beira Rio"	Cacaso, Joyce	3:52
5.	"Samba de Gago"	Joyce	3:15
6.	"Meio a Meio"	Joyce	2:20
7.	"Banho Maria"	Joyce, Terra	4:13
8.	"Mais uma Vez, Mais uma Voz"	Joyce, Terra	3:14
9.	"Eternamente Grávida"	Joyce	2:05
10.	"Doçura Forte/Água E Luz"	Joyce/Lucinha/Luli	2:05

== Personnel ==
- Joyce – vocals, classical guitar
- Danilo Caymmi – flute
- Paulo Guimaraes – flute
- Mauro Senise – flute, saxophones
- Alfredo Cardim – piano
- Haroldo Mauro Jr. – piano
- Sivuca – accordion
- Fernando Leporace – bass guitar, vocals
- Tutti Moreno – drums, percussion
- Chico Adnet – vocals
- Lize Bravo – vocals
- Ceu da Boca – vocals
- Edson Lobo – vocals
- Raimundo Nicioli – vocals
- Paulinho Pauliera – vocals
- Ronald Valle – vocals
- Clainha, Aninha, Marya & Rita – vocals
