= Bala Desejo =

Brazilian musical group

Bala Desejo is a Brazilian musical group formed in Rio de Janeiro in 2020.

== Background ==
The band formed in 2020, during the COVID-19 pandemic, when musicians and former Escola Parque schoolmates Dora Morelenbaum (the daughter of musicians Jaques and Paula Morelenbaum), Julia Mestre, Lucas Nunes and Zé Ibarra (the latter two also members of the group Banda Dônica) decided to spend the quarantine together in an apartment in Copacabana. Shortly later they started performing in web shows, often appearing as support band for singer Teresa Cristina in her Instagram live concerts. Producer Gabriel Andrade noted them and offered them an album, whose composition and production took 11 months. Their debut album SIM SIM SIM won the Latin Grammy Award for Best Portuguese Language Contemporary Pop Album. The band was also nominated for Best Group of the Year and Revelation of the Year at the 2022 Multishow Brazilian Music Awards.

The band has performed in various important festivals, including Rock in Rio and Primavera Sound.

Besides their involvement with the band, all the members have parallel solo careers; notably, Lucas is a Caetano Veloso collaborator, serving as tour musician, artistic director and record producer for Veloso.

== Musical style ==
The style mixes various genres and reprises the Brazilian avant-garde music of the 1970s.

== Discography ==
- SIM SIM SIM (2022)
