= Prato-e-faca =

Brazilian percussion instrument

Prato-e-faca (literally "plate-and-knife") is a Brazilian folk music instrument, a part of a minimal samba ensemble, which consists of a plate and a table knife.

It is, at its very basic, played in two ways. In the first way the plate is held "as though it were a custard pie the musician was preparing to throw in his own face, and the edge of the plate is scraped by the knife." In the second way the edge of the plate "is tapped with the edge of the knife".

Brazilian singer Cristina Buarque has an album named Prato e faca (1976).
