= Abraçaço =

Studio album by Caetano Veloso
- Released: 2012
- Genres: MPB, alternative rock
- Label: Universal Records
- Producers: Caetano Veloso; BandaCê

Caetano Veloso chronology
Live at Carnegie Hall (2012)	Abraçaço (2012)	Meu Coco (2021)

Abraçaço (transl. Big Hug) is an album by Brazilian singer, songwriter, and guitarist Caetano Veloso, released in 2012 on Universal Records.

In November 2013, the album won the Latin Grammy of Best Singer-Songwriter Album. The song "Um Abraçaço" was also nominated for Record of the Year, Song of the Year and Latin Grammy Award for Best Brazilian Song. In the following year, a live version of the song "A Bossa Nova é Foda" was nominated for 2014 Latin Grammy's song of the Year and Best Brazilian Song.

The album was elected the best 2012 Brazilian album by Rolling Stone Brasil and "A Bossa Nova é Foda" was considered by the same magazine as the third best Brazilian song of the same year.

== Track listing ==
1. "A Bossa Nova É Foda" - 3:54
2. "Um Abraçaço" - 3:50
3. "Estou Triste" - 5:13
4. "O Império da Lei" - 4:07
5. "Quero Ser Justo" - 3:52
6. "Um Comunista" - 8:33
7. "Funk Melódico" - 4:38
8. "Vinco" - 5:40
9. "Quando o Galo Cantou" - 3:46
10. "Parabéns" - 3:06
11. "Gayana" - 4:25

== Personnel ==
- Caetano Veloso - lead vocals, acoustic guitar

Banda Cê

- Pedro Sá - electric guitar, background vocals
- Ricardo Dias Gomes - bass, keyboards, background vocals
- Marcelo Callado - drums, percussion background vocals

Special guests

- Thalma de Freitas, Nina Becker, Lan Lan & Alinne Moraes - background vocals on "Parabéns"
- Moreno Veloso - bass and cymbals on "Gayana"

Production

- Moreno Veloso - production, recording, mixing
- Pedro Sá - production
- Daniel Carvalho - recording, mixing
- Felipe Fernandes, Leo Moreira, Pedro Tambellini - recording/mixing assistants
- Ricardo Garcia - mastering at Magic Master, Rio de Janeiro

Additional personnel

- Arrangements: Caetano Veloso, Pedro Sá, Ricardo Dias Gomes & Marcelo Callado
- Art direction and photography: Fernando Young and Tonho Quinta-Feira
- Styling: Felipe Veloso
- Review of texts: Luiz Augusto
- Graphics coordinator: Geysa Adnet
- Artistic Direction (Universal Music): Paul Ralphes

== Charts ==
Chart (2012)	Peak position
Portuguese Albums (AFP)	15
