= Tote King =

Spanish hip hop artist

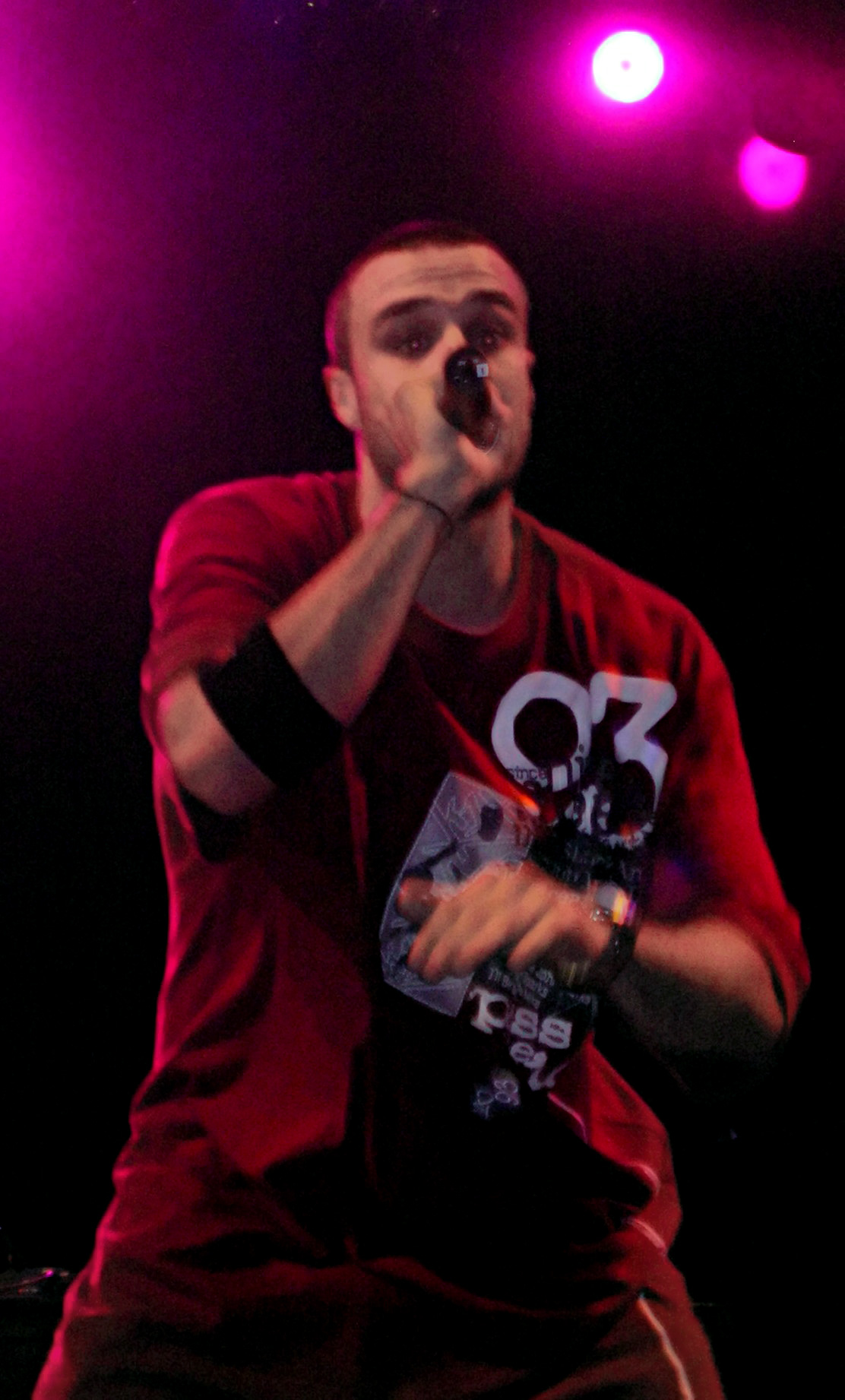
- Tote King performing in 2006

Background information
- Born: 13 December 1978 (age 47)
- Genre: Hip hop
- Occupations: Rapper; singer; songwriter
- Years active: 1999 –present

Tote King (born December 13, 1978) is a hip hop emcee (MC) from Sevilla, Spain.

== Information ==
Tote King began his career in the year of 1999 when he was part of a group known as La Alta Escuela. Their first album name was En Pie de Vuelo. As a solo artist, he started with the Big King XXL demo and the maxi Duermen. In the year of 2002, he joined together with his brother as a partnership known as Tote King and Shotta. Together they released the maxi Nada Para Mí and the Tu Madre Es una Foca long-player. Nada Para Mí 2002 allowed Tote King and Shotta to receive the Hip-Hop Nation award for Best Rookie MC.Both of these albums were produced on the Superego label. Tote King then went on to produce another solo album called Matemáticas. His second solo album was known as Un Tipo Cualquiera three years later through the Boa Music label and produced by Big Hozone, Vast Aire, and Cannibal Ox. Tote King released his third album, T.O.T.E, which is known to be of a different style than his previous ones.

== Discography ==
=== Albums ===
- Música para enfermos (2004)
- Un tipo cualquiera (2006)
- T.O.T.E. (2008)
- El lado oscuro de Gandhi (2010)
- 78 (2015)
- Lebron (2018)
- The Kingtape (2021)
- Luces fuera (2024)
