= Astronauta: Canções de Elis =

Studio album by Joyce
- Released: 1998
- Label: Pau Brasil; Blue Jackel
- Producer: Kazuo Yoshida, Rodolfo Stroeter

Joyce chronology
Ilha Brasil (1996)	Astronauta: Canções de Elis (1998)	Hard Bossa (1999)

Astronauta: Canções de Elis is an album by the Brazilian musician Joyce, released in 1998. It is a tribute to música popular brasileira songs associated with Elis Regina. Joyce supported the album by playing shows in North America. The album was nominated for a Latin Grammy Award for "Best MPB (Musica Popular Brasileira) Album".

== Production ==
Recorded in New York City, the album was produced by Kazuo Yoshida and Rodolfo Stroeter. Joe Lovano played saxophone on the album; Mulgrew Miller and Renee Rosnes played piano. Dori Caymmi contributed backing vocals. Joyce had written "Essa Mulher" for Regina. "Waters of March" is a cover of the Antonio Carlos Jobim song. "Samba pra Elis" was written by Joyce and Paulo César Pinheiro.

== Critical reception ==
Professional ratings
Review scores
Source	Rating
AllMusic	4/5 stars
Birmingham Post	3/5 stars
MusicHound World: The Essential Album Guide	4.5/5 stars

The San Diego Union-Tribune called the album "an enchanting musical blend that is simultaneously tender and vibrant, contemplative and celebratory." The Sunday Times praised the "worldly harmonies and thoughtfully varied tempos." The Rocky Mountain News determined that "Joyce blends her Brazilian cool with jazz heat."

AllMusic deemed Astronauta "a strong vocal album, both in the rhythmic and in the heartfelt numbers, having additional interest brought by the superb instrumental performances."

== Track listing ==
No.	Title	Length
1.	"Samba pra Elis"
2.	"Canto de Ossanha"
3.	"Upa Neguinho"
4.	"Morro Velho"
5.	"Aquarela do Brasil"
6.	"O Cantador"
7.	"Astronauta (Samba do Pergunta)"
8.	"Oriente"
9.	"Folhas Secas"
10.	"Querelas do Brasil"
11.	"Menino das Laranjas"
12.	"Essa Mulher"
13.	"Na Batucada da Vida"
14.	"Waters of March (Águas de Março)"
