= Livro =

Studio album by Caetano Veloso
- Released: November 10, 1998
- Genres: MPB, Latin music
- Length: 53:59
- Label: Nonesuch
- Producers: Jaques Morelenbaum, Caetano Veloso

Caetano Veloso chronology
Fina Estampa Ao Vivo (1994)	Livro (1998)	Prenda Minha (1999)

Livro (transl. Book) is an album by Caetano Veloso, released through the record label Nonesuch in 1998. The album was released internationally by Nonesuch Records as part of Veloso's recorded work during the 1990s.

== Reception ==
Professional ratings
Review scores
Source	Rating
AllMusic	4.5/5 stars
Pitchfork	9.0/10
Wilson & Alroy's	4.5/5 stars

In 2000, the album earned Veloso the Grammy Award for Best World Music Album and a Latin Grammy Award nomination for Album of the Year, in addition to winning the Latin Grammy Award for Best MPB Album. (Note: The Latin Grammy nomination was shared with Jaques Morelenbaum (producer) and Moogie Canazio (engineer/mixer).)

== Track listing ==
All tracks are written by Caetano Veloso, except where noted.

No.	Title	Writer(s)	Length
1.	"Os Passistas" (Carnaval Dancers)		3:23
2.	"Livros" (Books)		4:31
3.	"Onde O Rio E Mais Baiano" (Where Rio Is Most Bahian)		3:22
4.	"Manhatã (Para Lulu Santos)" (For Lulu Santos)		5:17
5.	"Doideca"		3:40
6.	"Voce É Minha" (You Are Mine)		3:44
7.	"Um Tom"		2:29
8.	"How Beautiful a Being Could Be"	Moreno Veloso	3:27
9.	"O Navio Negreiro" (The Slave Ship; Excerto)	Castro Alves	5:17
10.	"Não Enche" (Don't Tease Me)		3:31
11.	"Minha Voz, Minha Vida" (My Voice, My Life)		2:50
12.	"Alexandre" (Alexander)		5:48
13.	"Na Baixa do Sapateiro" (In the Shoemaker's Hollow)	Ary Barroso	3:46
14.	"Pra Ninguém" (For No One)		2:59

== Certification ==
Region	Certification	Certified units/sales
Brazil (Pro-Música Brasil)	Gold	100,000^{*}
^{*} Sales figures based on certification alone.
