= Caravanas =

Studio album by Chico Buarque
- Released: August 25, 2017
- Genre: MPB
- Length: 27:43
- Label: Biscoito Fino
- Producer: Vinícius França; Luiz Cláudio Ramos

Chico Buarque chronology
Na Carreira - Ao Vivo (2012)	Caravanas (2017)	Caravanas - Ao Vivo (2018)

Singles from Caravanas
- 1. "Tua Cantiga" Released: July 28, 2017

Caravanas is the thirty eighth studio album by Brazilian musician Chico Buarque, released on August 25, 2017, through Biscoito Fino. It was produced by Vinícius França and Luiz Cláudio Ramos and features collaborations with Chico Brown, Clara Buarque and Rafael Mike. A live version of the album as well as a DVD titled Caravanas - Ao Vivo were released in 2018.

At the 19th Annual Latin Grammy Awards, the album was nominated for Album of the Year and won Best MPB Album while the song "As Caravanas" won Best Portuguese Language Song, additionally, Luiz Cláudio Ramos was nominated for Best Arrangement for "Massarandupió".

The album sold 20,000 copies in Brasil within its first year of release.

== Background ==
The album was released five years from Buarque's previous studio album Chico (2011). Unlike other albums by Buarque that usually had short periods of recording, Caravanas was recorded through two years, with almost three months between the recording of each track, the album was recorded at Biscoito Fino Studios in Rio de Janeiro, Brazil and was produced by Vinícius França, it featured arrangements by Luiz Cláudio Ramos as well as the participation from musicians Jorge Helder, Jurim Moreira and João Rebouças, following its recording, the project was stored in a hard drive and locked in a safe by the label until its official released on August 25, 2017, to avoit piracy. The cover for the album was designed by Cássia D'Elia and was photographed by Leo Avesa. The first single for the album, "Tua Cantiga" was released on July 28, 2017.

The album is composed of nine tracks and contains collaborations with Rafael Mike from Dream Team do Passinho in "As Caravanas" and two of Buarque's grandchildren, Chico Brown in "Massarandupió" and Clara Buarque in "Dueto", the album also includes two songs previously released in other projects, "Moça do Sonho", written by Buarque and Edu Lobo and released in the album Cambaio (2001) by Buarque and Lobo, and "Dueto", previously produced by Buarque in 1980 for the play O rei de Ramos and recorded with Nara Leão for her album Com Açúcar, Com Afeto (1980).

== Critical reception ==
Professional ratings
Review scores
Source	Rating
Rolling Stone	3.5/5 stars

Paulo Cavalcanti from Rolling Stone Brasil gave the album three and a half stars out of five writing that "in terms of sounds and themes, the album is pure placidity", he also commented of the variety of the songs writing that "romanticism in its various nuances guides the record, which features modinha ("Tua Cantiga"), valsinha ("Dueto") and ballad with a jazz background ("A Moça do Sonho"), the syncopated samba is the face of the football "Jogo de Bola" and the samba-canção governs "Desaforos", "Caravans", the title track, closes the work with epic sonic ambition". The magazine included the album in their list of Best National Albums of 2017, placing it at number three writing that "Caravanas is the portrait of Brazil that is becoming gradually rarer".

== Track listing ==
Caravanas track listing
No.	Title	Writer(s)	Length
1.	"Tua Cantiga"	Chico Buarque; Cristóvão Bastos	4:11
2.	"Blues Pra Bia"	Buarque	3:16
3.	"A Moça do Sonho"	Buarque; Edu Lobo	2:46
4.	"Jogo de Bola"	Buarque	2:51
5.	"Massarandupió" (featuring Chico Brown)	Buarque; Chico Brown	2:43
6.	"Dueto" (featuring Clara Buarque)	Buarque	3:22
7.	"Casualmente"	Buarque; Jorge Helder	3:01
8.	"Desaforos"	Buarque	2:42
9.	"As Caravanas" (featuring Rafael Mike)	Buarque	2:47
Total length:			27:43
