= Edu Lobo =

Brazilian musical artist (born 1943)

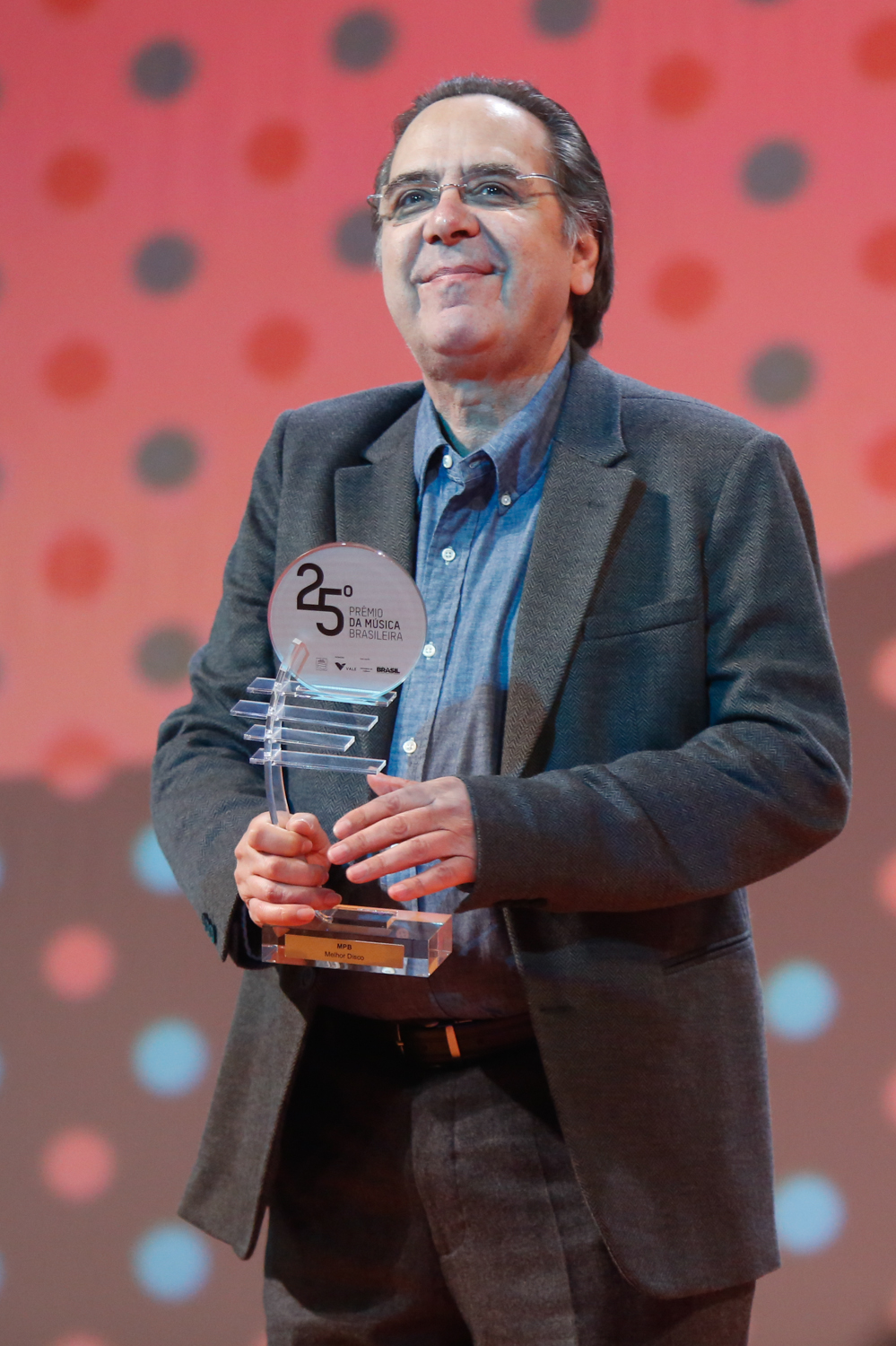
- Edú Lobo

Background information
- Born: Eduardo de Góes Lobo; August 29, 1943 (age 82); Rio de Janeiro, RJ
- Origin: Brazil
- Genres: Bossa Nova
- Website: https://edulobo.com.br

Eduardo de Góes "Edu" Lobo (born August 29, 1943) is a Brazilian singer, guitarist, and composer.

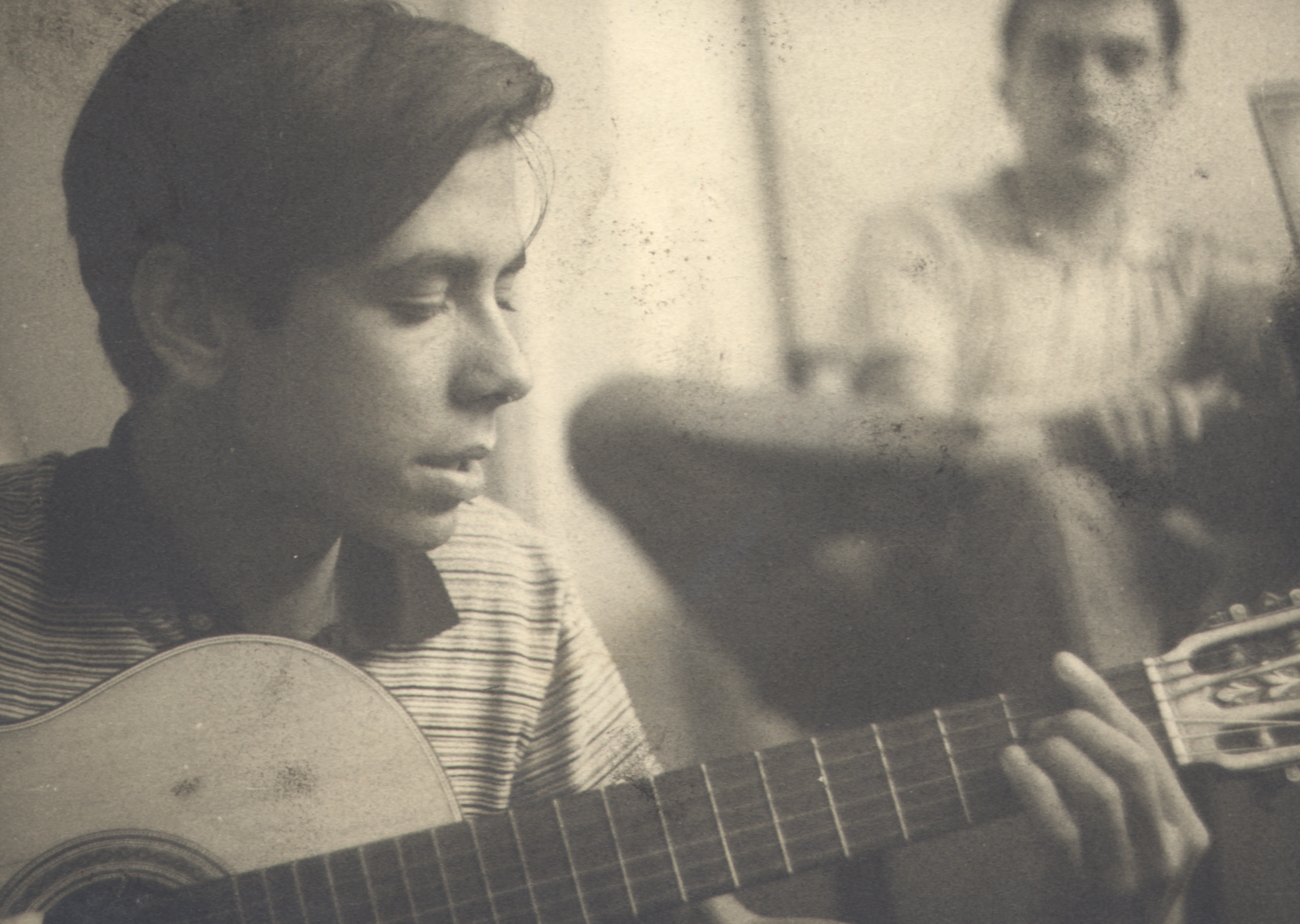
Edu Lobo, 1963.

Edu Lobo, 1967

In the 1960s he was part of the bossa nova movement.

His compositions include Upa Neguinho (with Gianfrancesco Guarnieri), Pra Dizer Adeus (with Torquato Neto; also known in its English version as "To say goodbye"), Choro Bandido, A história de Lily Braun, Beatriz (the latter three songs with Chico Buarque), Arrastão and Canto triste (both with Vinicius de Moraes), and Ponteio (with Capinam). Ponteio won best song at the 3rd Festival de Música Popular Brasileira in the recording by Quarteto Novo in 1967.

He has worked with, and his songs have been covered by, artists including Toots Thielemans, Marcos Valle, Elis Regina, Sylvia Telles, Sergio Mendes, Antonio Carlos Jobim, Milton Nascimento, Maria Bethânia, Gilberto Gil, Gal Costa, Caetano Veloso, Monica Salmaso, Sarah Vaughan, Earth, Wind & Fire, and Caterina Valente.

Dos Navegantes, a collaboration album by him, Romero Lubambo and Mauro Senise, won the 2017 Latin Grammy Award for Best MPB Album.

== Discography ==
- A musica de Edú Lobo Por Edu Lobo – Edú Lobo – 1964 Elenco
- Edú canta Zumbi – 1965 Som Maior
- Edú & Bethania – Edú Lobo / Maria Bethania – 1966 Elenco
- Reencontro – Sylvia Telles / Edú Lobo / Trio Tamba / Quinteto Villa-Lobos – 1966
- Edú – 1967 Philips
- Edú Canta Zumbi – 1968 Elenco
- Sergio Mendes Presents Lobo – Edú Lobo – 1970 A&M
- Cantiga de longe – Edú Lobo – 1970 Elenco
- Missa Breve – Edú Lobo / Milton Nascimento – 1972 EMI Odeon
- Deus lhe pague – Varios / Several – 1976 EMI Odeon
- Limite das aguas – Edú Lobo – 1976 Continental
- Camaleão – Edú Lobo – 1978 Philips
- Tempo presente – Edú Lobo – 1980 Polygram
- Edú & Tom – Edú Lobo / Tom Jobim – 1981 Polygram
- Jogos de Dança – 1981 –
- O Grande Circo Místico – Milton Nascimento / Jane Duboc / Gal Costa / Simone / Gilberto Gil / Tim Maia / Zizi Possi / Chico Buarque / Edú Lobo – 1983 Som Livre
- Dança da Meia Lua – Edu Lobo – 1985 Sigla
- O Corsário do Rei – Fagner / Edú Lobo / ChicoBuarque / Blitz / Gal Costa / MPB4 / Nana Caymmi / Lucinha Lins / Tom Jobim / Zé Renato / Claudio Nucci / Ivan Lins / Marco N – 1985 Som Livre
- Rá-Tim-Bum – Boca Livre, Caetano Veloso, Joyce, Maíra, Quarteto Quatro por Quatro, Ze Renato, Edú Lobo, Jane Duboc, Rosa Maria – 1989 –
- Corrupião – Edú Lobo – 1993 Velas
- Meia Noite – Edú Lobo, Dori Caymmi – 1995 Velas
- Songbook Edú Lobo – Varios / Various – 1995 Lumiar Discos
- Album de Teatro – 1997 BMG
- Cambaio – Edú Lobo / Chico Buarque / Gal Costa / Lenine / Zizi Possi – 2002
- Tantas Marés – 2010 Biscoito Fino
- Dos Navegantes – Edú Lobo / Romero Lubambo / Mauro Senise – 2017 Biscoito Fino
- Edu, Dori & Marcos – Edu Lobo / Marcos Valle / Dori Caymmi

With Paul Desmond

- From the Hot Afternoon (A&M/CTI, 1969)
