= Kany García discography =

- Studio albums: 9
- Live albums: 1
- Singles: 13
- Music videos: 12
- Promotional singles: 3

This is a comprehensive listing of official releases by Kany García, a Puerto Rican Latin pop singer.

== Discography ==
=== Studio albums ===
Title	Details	Peak chart positions					Certifications
Title	Details	US	US Latin	US Latin Pop	MEX	SPA	Certifications
Cualquier Día	Released: July 7, 2007; Label: Sony BMG; Formats: CD, Digital download	—	48	10	41	—	AMPROFON: Gold; RIAA: Platinum (Latin)
Boleto de Entrada	Released: September 22, 2009; Label: Sony Music Latin; Formats: CD, digital download	193	6	3	71	—	RIAA: Gold (Latin)
Kany García	Released: July 31, 2012; Label: Sony Music Latin; Formats: CD, digital download	—	5	1	72	—	RIAA: Gold (Latin)
Limonada	Released: May 20, 2016; Label: Sony Music Latin; Formats: CD, digital download	—	1	1	—	—	
Soy Yo	Released: May 18, 2018; Label: Sony Music Latin; Formats: CD, digital download	—	4	2	—	—	AMPROFON: Gold; RIAA: Gold (Latin)
Contra el Viento	Released: May 17, 2019; Label: Sony Music Latin; Formats: CD, digital download	—	22	3	—	—	
Mesa Para Dos	Released: May 28, 2020; Label: Sony Music Latin; Formats: CD, digital download	—	—	15	—	—	
El Amor Que Merecemos	Released: May 26, 2022; Label: Sony Music Latin; Formats: CD, digital download	—	—	15	—	74	RIAA: Gold (Latin)
García	Released: May 2, 2024; Label: Sony Music Latin; Formats: CD, digital download	—	39	5	—	80	RIAA: 4× Platinum (Latin)
Puerta Abierta	Released: April 9, 2026; Label: 502 Records; Formats: CD, digital download	—	—	—	—	—	

=== Live albums ===
List of live albums, with selected chart positions and details
Title	Details	Chart positions	
Title	Details	US Latin	US Latin Pop
En Vivo: Kany Garcia	Released: August 19, 2014; Label: Sony BMG; Formats: CD, Digital download	4	3

=== Singles ===
Year	Single	Chart positions			Album
Year	Single	US Top Latin Songs	US Latin Pop Airplay	Puerto Rico Top Songs	Album
2007	"Hoy Ya Me Voy"	22	4	1	Cualquier Día
2007	"¿Qué Nos Pasó?"	—	22	10	Cualquier Día
2008	"Amigo en el Baño"	44	22	1	Cualquier Día
2008	"Esta Soledad"	21	6	1	Cualquier Día
2008	"Estigma De Amor"	43	15	5	Cualquier Día
2009	"Feliz"	15	4	1	Boleto De Entrada
2010	"Esta Vida Tuya Y Mía"	39	14	6	Boleto De Entrada
2010	"Para Volver a Amar"	—	21	3	Boleto De Entrada
2012	"Que Te Vaya Mal"	—	—	4	Kany García
2012	"Alguien"	30	8	2	Kany García
2013	"Cuando Se Va El Amor"	31	23	9	Kany García
2013	"Adios"	-	40	5	Kany García
2014	"Duele Menos"		34	6	En Vivo: Kany Garcia
2015	"Perfecto Para Mi"		33	10	Limonada
2016	"Cómo Decirle"		32	5	Limonada
2016	"Aqui"		31	1	Limonada
2016	"Me Pregunto"			25	Limonada
2018	"Para Siempre"				Soy Yo
2018	"Soy Yo"				Soy Yo

==== Promotional singles ====
Year	Single	Chart positions			Album
Year	Single	US Top Latin Songs	US Latin Pop Airplay	Puerto Rico Top Songs	Album
2011	"Yo No Tengo Nah"	—	19	1	Digital download
2012	"Demasiado Bueno"	48	—	21	Kany García
2012	"Me Quedo"	—	—	35	Kany García

==== Featured singles ====
Artist	Album	Song	Year	Chart	Position
Pedro Capó	"Pedro Capó"	"Si tu me lo Pides"	2009	Billboard Latin Pop AirPlay	22
Gilberto Santa Rosa	"Irrepetible"	"Y Tu y Yo"	2010	Billboard Latin Pop AirPlay	35
DVICIO	"Quedate"	Que Tienes Tu	2017	N/A	N/A

=== Music videos ===
Album	Year	Video	Director(s)
Cualquier Día	2007	"Hoy Ya Me Voy"	Alexis Gudiño
Cualquier Día	2007	"¿Qué Nos Pasó?"	Alexis Gudiño
Cualquier Día	2008	"Amigo en el Baño"	Pedro Juan Hernandez
Cualquier Día	2008	"Esta Soledad"	Claudio Diavela
Cualquier Día	2008	"Estigma De Amor"	Beto Hinojosa & Pablo Dávila
Capadocia, Un lugar sin Perdon	2008	"Bajo el mismo Cielo"	—
Boleto De Entrada	2009	"Feliz"	Picky Talarico
Boleto De Entrada	2010	"Esta Vida Tuya Y Mía"	—
Boleto De Entrada	2010	"Para Volver a Amar"	William “Pipo” Torres
Kany Garcia	2012	"Que Te Vaya Mal"	Miguel Roldán
Kany Garcia	2012	"Alguien"	Miguel Roldán
En Vivo: Kany Garcia	2014	"Duele Menos"	Kelvin Rosa.

==== Filmography ====
Movie	Song	Year	Notes
Argentina, 1985	"Nunca más"	2022	Co-produced and co-written with Pedro Osuna, Victoria Alonso, Rafa Arcaute
