= List of awards and nominations received by Kany García =

Kany García awards and nominations
Awards and nominations
Award	Wins	Nominations

This is a list of awards and nominations of Puerto Rican singer Kany García.

== ASCAP Awards ==
These awards are given to songwriters and producers.

Year	Nominee / work	Award	Result
2014	Kany García	Pop Song of the Year for Cuando Se Va El Amor	Won

== Latin Grammys Awards ==
The Latin Grammy Awards are awarded annually by the National Academy of Recording Arts and Sciences of the United States.

Year	Nominee / work	Award	Result
2008	Cualquier Día	Best Female Pop Vocal Album	Won
2008	Kany García	Best New Artist	Won
2008	"Hoy Ya Me Voy"	Song of the Year	Nominated
2008	"Cualquier Día"	Album of the Year	Nominated
2010	Boleto De Entrada	Best Female Pop Vocal Album	Nominated
2012	Que Te Vaya Mal	Record of the Year	Nominated
2013	Kany Garcia	Best Singer-Songwriter Album	Nominated
2013	Kany Garcia	Best Engineered Album	Won
2018	Para Siempre	Record of the Year	Nominated
2018	Para Siempre	Song of the Year	Nominated
2018	Soy Yo	Album of the Year	Nominated
2018	Soy Yo	Best Singer-Songwriter Album	Nominated
2019	"Banana Papaya"	Best Short Form Music Video	Won
2019	"Contra el Viento"	Best Singer-Songwriter Album	Won
2019	"Quédate" featuring Tommy Torres	Record of the Year	Nominated
2022	Herself	Leading Ladies of Entertainment	Won

== Grammy Awards ==
The Grammy Awards are awarded annually by the National Academy of Recording Arts and Sciences of the United States.

Awards ceremony	Award	Nominated work	Result
2011 Grammy Awards	Best Latin Pop Album	Boleto de Entrada	Nominated
2013 Grammy Awards	Best Latin Pop Album	Kany Garcia	Nominated
2021 Grammy Awards	Best Latin Pop or Urban Album	Mesa Para Dos	Nominated

== GLAAD Media Awards ==
Year	Nominee / work	Award	Result
2016	Kany García	Outstanding Music Artist (Spanish)	Won

== Billboard Latin Music Awards ==
The Billboard Latin Music Awards are awarded each year by Billboard Magazine based on radio airplay, digital downloads and album sales.

Year	Nominee / work	Award	Result
2008	Cualquier Día	Latin Pop Album of the Year, New Artist	Won
2008	"Hoy Ya Me Voy"	Latin Pop Airplay Song of the Year, New Artist	Won
2008	"Hoy Ya Me Voy"	Latin Pop Airplay Song of the Year, Female	Nominated
2008	"¿Qué Nos Pasó?"	Latin Pop Airplay Song of the Year, New Artist	Nominated

== Orgullosamente Latino ==
The Orgullosamente Latino are awarded each year by fans all around the world. The awards are taken place in Puerto Rico.

Year	Nominee / work	Award	Result
2010	Kany García	Female Soloist of the Year	Nominated

== Premios Oye ==
The Premios Oye are awards each year by the Mexican Recording Industry.

Year	Nominee / work	Award	Result
2008	Kany García	Revelación del Año	Nominated
2008	Kany García	Pop Español Solista Femenino	Nominated

== Premio Lo Nuestro ==
The Premio Lo Nuestro are awards given by the fans and music producers. They are given each year.

Year	Nominee / work	Award	Result
2009	Kany García	Artista Femenina Pop Del Año	Nominated
2011	Kany García	Artista Femenina Pop Del Año	Nominated

== Premio Juventud ==
The Premio Juventud are awards given and voted by the young fans. They are given each year.

Year	Nominee / work	Award	Result
2010	Somos El Mundo	La Combinacion Perfecta (The Perfect Combination)	Won

== Premios Paoli ==
The Premios Paoli are awards voted by the fans and awards given in Puerto Rico.

Year	Nominee / work	Award	Result
2010	Kany García	Cantante Femenina Del Año	Nominated

== Premios People en Español ==
These awards are voted by fans on peopleenespanol.com

Year	Nominee / work	Award	Result
2012	Kany García	Cantante Femenina Del Año	Nominated

== Premios TV y Novela ==
The Premios TV y Novela are awards given for performances in soap operas (novelas).

Year	Nominee / work	Award	Result
2011	Para Volver Amar	Mejor Tema Musical de TeleNovela (Best Song from Soap Opera)	Nominated

== Soberano awards ==
Year	Nominee / work	Award	Result
2019	Kany García	Soberano Internacional	Won

== Other achievements ==
- Kany became Billboard Magazine 2007 Latin Breakthrough New Artist of the Year
- García was included on iTunes Latino Best of 2008, on where she was named one of the Best New Artist.
- The album "Boleto De Entrada" was included on iTunes Latino "Albums of the Year: Pop Latino 2009".
- "The album "Kany Garcia" was included on "iTunes" Latino "Best of 2012: Pop & Urban".
