= Boleto De Entrada Tour =

2010 concert tour by Kany García

- Tour by Kany García
- Promotional poster for the tour
- Associated album: Boleto De Entrada
- Start date: June 11, 2010
- End date: June 11, 2010
- No. of shows: 1

Kany García concert chronology
- Kany García: Live In Puerto Rico (2007); Boleto De Entrada Tour (2010–11); Kany García: En Concierto (2013)

The Boleto De Entrada Tour was a concert tour by Puerto Rican singer-songwriter Kany García in support of her second studio album of the same name, presented by the "Oficina de la Procuradora de las Mujeres de Puerto Rico". García expected to start touring this album in the summer of 2010. The tour started in Puerto Rico and continued in Latin America and the United States. García said via her official Twitter page that she would be on a promotional tour in Mexico from 5 to 11 July 2010, promoting what would be her concert tour in late 2010. In early 2011, she also toured other Latin American countries.

== Set list ==
=== Puerto Rico ===
1. "Dime la Verdad"
2. "Esta Soledad"
3. "Adónde vas""
4. "Eres Tú"
5. "Para Volver a Amar"
6. "Todo Basta"
7. "Estigma De Amor"
8. "12 de Noviembre"
9. "Feliz"
10. "Cuando Tú No Estás"
11. "Te Vuelvo a Ver"
12. "¿Qué Nos Pasó?"
13. "Hoy"
14. "Hasta Dónde"
15. "Esta Vida Tuya Y Mía"
16. "¿Adónde fue Cecilia?"
17. "Si Tú Me Lo Pides" featuring Pedro Capó
18. "Si Ya No Estas Conmigo"
19. "Amigo en el Baño"
20. "Mi Dueña" featuring Victoria Sanabria
21. "Hoy Ya Me Voy"

== Tour dates ==
| Date | City | Country | Venue |
Pre-concert appearances
| April 16, 2010 | Mayagüez | Puerto Rico | Justas de la Liga Atlética Interuniversitaria |
Latin America
| June 11, 2010 | San Juan | Puerto Rico | Coliseo de Puerto Rico |

== Personnel ==
Tour Sponsors

- MGD Light - Puerto Rico
- Ford Motor Company - Puerto Rico
- Univision - Puerto Rico
- Dove - Puerto Rico
- Fidelity - Puerto Rico
- COPEP - Puerto Rico
- El Nuevo Día - Puerto Rico
