= En Vivo (Kany García album) =

En Vivo: Kany Garcia

Live album by Kany García
- Released: February 25, 2015
- Recorded: 2013
- Genre: Latin pop, rock, folk
- Label: Sony BMG
- Producer: Marcos Sánchez (producer); Kany García (co-producer)

Kany García chronology
Kany Garcia (2013)	En Vivo: Kany Garcia (2015)	Limonada (2016)

Singles from Kany Garcia
- 1. "Duele Menos" Released: May 27, 2014; 2. "Pasaporte" Released: February 24, 2015

En Vivo is the first live album and fourth overall album of Latin Grammy winner, singer-songwriter Kany García. The album was released on February 25, 2015. This live album was recorded at the Coliseo de Puerto Rico.

== Album information ==
En Vivo, produced and directed by Marcos Sanchez, was recorded at García's concert in Puerto Rico that took place in February 2013. The album is composed of eighteen hits and includes an unreleased track called "Duele Menos". García had the collaboration of friends like Santiago Cruz, and Merengue artist Joseph Fonseca. The big surprise of the evening was the performance of "Estigma De Amor" who Kany sang with her mother Shela De Jesus.

== Track listing ==
No.	Title	Length
1.	"Duele Menos"	2:56
2.	"Me Quedo"	3:47
3.	"Para Volver Amar"	3:42
4.	"¿Qué Nos Pasó?"	2:08
5.	"Hoy"	2:24
6.	"Adios"	4:32
7.	"Cuando Se Va El Amor" (featuring Santiago Cruz)	4:22
8.	"Esta Soledad"	3:14
9.	"Pasaporte"	3:52
10.	"Esta Vida Tuya Y Mía"	3:49
11.	"Feliz"	3:09
12.	"Demasiado Bueno"	2:46
13.	"Estigma De Amor" (featuring Shela De Jesus)	4:25
14.	"Amigo en el Baño"	4:25
15.	"Hoy Ya Me Voy"	5:23
16.	"Alguien"	3:43
17.	"Que Me Quieras" (featuring Joseph Fonseca)	4:31
18.	"Que Te Vaya Mal"	3:35

== Personnel ==
- Antonio Alonso - Bass
- Sonlys Andino - Chorus
- Santiago Cruz - Featured Artist
- José Daniel DeJesús - Cello
- José E. Diaz - Mix
- Arnaldo Figueroa - Violin
- Joseph Fonseca - Featured Artist
- Kany García - Composer, Primary Artist, Ukulele
- Abimanuel Hernández - Chorus
- Javier Matos - Viola
- Silvette Mirand - Chorus
- Yajaira O'Neill - Violin
- Julio Reyes - Composer
- Keren Rodríguez - Chorus
- Marcos Sanchez - Composer, Fender Rhodes, Hammond B3, Mezcla, Piano
- Flor Ruben Torres - Backline Technician

== Charts ==
Chart	Peak position
U.S Billboard Top Latin Albums	4
U.S Billboard Latin Pop Albums	3
