= Kany Garcia (album) =

Studio album by Kany García
- Released: July 31, 2012
- Recorded: 2010–2011 (Bogotá, Colombia)
- Genre: Latin pop, rock, folk
- Length: 40:23 (Standard Edition); 53:14 (DVD)
- Label: Sony BMG
- Producer: Paul Forat (executive producer); Julio Reyes Copello(producer); Kany García (co-producer)

Kany García chronology
Boleto de Entrada (2010)	Kany Garcia (2012)	En Vivo: Kany Garcia (2014)

Singles from Kany Garcia
- 1. "Que Te Vaya Mal" Released: April 24, 2012; 2. "Alguien" Released: July 10, 2012; 3. "Cuando Se Va El Amor" Released: January 1, 2013; 4. "Adiós" Released: April 2013; 5. "Demasiado Bueno" Released: July 31, 2013

Professional ratings
Review scores
Source	Rating
Allmusic	4/5 stars

Kany Garcia is the third studio album of Latin Grammy winner, singer-songwriter Kany García. It was released on July 31, 2012 and produced by Kany García, Julio Reyes Copello and Paul Forat Sony BMG. The album's first single "Que Te Vaya Mal" was nominated for Record of the Year at the 2012 Latin Grammy Awards. The album was nominated for "Best Latin Pop Album" at the 2013 Grammy Awards.

== Album information ==
The album was recorded in Bogotá, Colombia. The live version of the album, which was recorded for a mini-movie/live concert type available as part of the CD/DVD set or iTunes digital format was recorded in the Pontificia Javeriana University in Bogotá.

== Promotion ==
As a part of promotion, Kany released a song from the album each week in July starting with the first single "Que Te Vaya Mal". The other songs released were "Alguien", "Demasiado Bueno" and "Me Quedo".

=== Singles ===
- "Que Te Vaya Mal" was released as the album's lead single on April 24, 2012.
- "Alguien" is chosen as the album second single and will be released sometime in August. It peaked at #8 on Billboard Latin Pop chart.
- "Cuando Se Va El Amor" was officially announced as the third single by Kany Garcia via her Facebook page. The song reached the Top 40 on Billboard's Latin Song Chart and Top 30 on Latin Pop Airplay.
- "Adiós" was released as the album's fourth single on April 22, 2013. The song reached the Top 40 on Billboard's Latin Pop Chart.

=== Promotional singles ===
Prior to the release of the album, two promotional singles were released exclusively on iTunes Store as a "Countdown to KANY GARCIA".

- "Demasiado Bueno" was the first promotional single, released on July 18, 2012.
- "Me Quedo" was the second and last promotion single, released on July 24, 2012.

== Track listing ==
No.	Title	Writer(s)	Length
1.	"Me Quedo"	Kany García	3:20
2.	"Cuando Se Va El Amor"	Kany García	4:09
3.	"Que Te Vaya Mal"	Kany García	2:33
4.	"Adiós"	Kany García, Julio Reyes Copello	3:29
5.	"Demasiado Bueno"	Kany García	2:45
6.	"Esta Soledad (featuring Dani Martín)"	Kany García	3:16
7.	"Que Me Quieras (featuring Jorge Celedón & Jimmy Zambrano)"	Kany García	3:05
8.	"Pasaporte"	Kany García	3:48
9.	"Hoy Ya Me Voy (featuring Franco De Vita)"	Kany García	3:54
10.	"Alguien"	Kany García	3:03
11.	"Estigma De Amor (featuring Antonio Carmona)"	Kany García	3:28
12.	"Si Yo Me Olvido"	Kany García	3:23

El Making de un Sueño - DVD
No.	Title	Length
1.	"Intro: El Making de un Sueño"
2.	"Interlude: Me Quedo"
3.	"Me Quedo"
4.	"Interlude: Cuando Se Va El Amor"
5.	"Cuando Se Va El Amor"
6.	"Interlude: Que Te Vaya Mal"
7.	"Que Te Vaya Mal"
8.	"Interlude: Adiós"
9.	"Adiós"
10.	"Interlude: Demasiado Bueno"
11.	"Demasiado Bueno"
12.	"Interlude: Esta Soledad"
13.	"Esta Soledad"
14.	"Interlude: Que Me Quieras"
15.	"Que Me Quieras"
16.	"Interlude: Pasaporte"
17.	"Pasaporte"
18.	"Interlude: Hoy Ya Me Voy"
19.	"Hoy Ya Me Voy"
20.	"Interlude: Alguien"
21.	"Alguien"
22.	"Interlude: Estigma de Amor"
23.	"Estigma de Amor"
24.	"Interlude: Si Yo Me Olvido"
25.	"Si Yo Me Olvido"

Notes

- Track listing and credits from album booklet.

== Personnel ==
Confirmed by the album booklet.

- Kany García - Composer, Primary Artist
- Juan Sebastian Atehortua - Trumpet
- Jairo Alfonso Barrera - Saxophone
- Antonio Carmona - Cajon, Guitars
- Andrés Castro - Guitars
- Julio Reyes Copello - Composer
- Santiago Prieto - Guitars
- Libardo Rey - Guitars
- Julio Reyes - Keyboards, Piano
- Miguel Rico - Keyboards, Piano
- Marcos Sanchez - Keyboards, Organo, Piano
- Froilán Sinti - Kena
- Aaron Sterling - Bateria
- Samuel Torres - Percussion
- Guillermo Vadala - Bass
- Juan Pablo Vega - Guitars
- Jimmy Zambrano - Accordion
- Oscar Grajales - Main Personnel
- Marcial Sinti - Main Personnel

=== Production ===
- Miguel Roldan - Director
- Julio Reyes Copello - Engineer, Producer
- Edgar Barrera - Engineer
- Natalia Ramírez - Assistant Engineer
- Julián Pinzón - Assistant Engineer
- Javier Garza - Engineer, Mixing
- Sebastian de Peyrecave - Engineer
- Ricardo Escallón - Coordination
- Paul Forat - Executive Producer
- Francesc Freixes - Graphic Design
- Mike Fuller - Mastering
- Andrea Bautista - Coordination
- Táriq Zia Burney - Assistant Engineer
- Lorenzo Caballero - Assistant Engineer
- Isabel de Jesús - A&R
- Rubén Martín - Photography
- Julio Muniz - A&R

== Tour ==
Kany García: En Concierto
- Tour by Kany García
- Promotional poster for the tour
- Associated album: Kany Garcia
- Start date: February 9, 2013
- End date: September 28, 2013
- Legs: 1
- No. of shows: 15 in North America; 7 in South America; 22 in total

Kany García concert chronology
- Boleto De Entrada Tour (2010–11); Kany García en Concierto (2013); Limonada Tour (2017)

In support of the album, García embarked on a concert tour, titled Kany García: En Concierto. The tour started in Puerto Rico and continued in US and Latin American countries like Dominican Republic, Costa Rica and Mexico.

=== Setlist ===
North America (San Juan, PR)
1. "Me Quedo"
2. "Para Volver a Amar"
3. "¿Qué Nos Pasó?"
4. "Hoy"
5. "Adiós"
6. "Cuando Se Va El Amor"
7. "Esta Soledad"
8. "Pasaporte"
9. "Si Yo Me Olvido"
10. "Amigo en el Baño"
11. "A Dónde Vas"
12. "Hoy Ya Me Voy"
13. "Que Me Quieras"
14. "Estigma De Amor"
15. "Mi Dueña"
16. "Que Te Vaya Mal"

=== Tour dates ===
Date	City	Country	Venue
Latin America
February 9, 2013	San Juan	Puerto Rico	Coliseo de Puerto Rico
February 20, 2013	Cali	Colombia	San Alejo Bar Cali
February 21, 2013	Medellín	Colombia	Santafé
February 22, 2013	Barranquilla	Colombia	Trucupey Latin Disco
April 20, 2013	Ponce	Puerto Rico	Estadio Francisco Montaner
May 2, 2013	Cartagena	Colombia	Hard Rock Cafe Cartagena
May 3, 2013	Barranquilla	Colombia	Estadio Romelio Martínez
May 4, 2013	Medellín	Colombia	La Macarena
May 23, 2013	San Juan	Puerto Rico	Club Tropicoro
May 31, 2013	Carolina	Puerto Rico	Roberto Clemente Stadium
June 23, 2013	Orocovis	Puerto Rico	Municipal Parking Lot
June 29, 2013	Aibonito	Puerto Rico	Annex to José Marrón Aponte Coliseum
June 30, 2013	Rio Grande	Puerto Rico	Ovidio de Jesus Stadium
July 9, 2013	Panama City	Panama	Hard Rock Café
July 13, 2013	Barceloneta	Puerto Rico	Plaza Pública
July 14, 2013	Cidra	Puerto Rico	Complejo Deportivo
July 19, 2013	Hatillo	Puerto Rico	Plaza Pública
July 26, 2013	Fajardo	Puerto Rico	Plaza de Recreo
August 3, 2013	Arecibo	Puerto Rico	Gasolina Beach Club
August 31, 2013	Juana Diaz	Puerto Rico	Centro Comercial Plaza
September 27, 2013	Aguada	Puerto Rico	Coliseo Ismael “Chavalillo” Delgado
September 28, 2013	Cabo Rojo	Puerto Rico	Plaza de Recreo Ramón Emeterio Betances

Cancellations and rescheduled shows

February 14, 2013	San José, Costa Rica	Estadio Nacional de Costa Rica	Rescheduled to July 27, 2013 and moved to Estadio Ricardo Saprissa Aymá, but then it was cancelled.

== Chart performance ==
On its first day of release, the album charted at #189 on iTunes top 200 albums chart, #2 on iTunes Latino album charts and #1 on Pop Latino album charts in United States and Puerto Rico. The album debuted at #1 on Billboard Latin Pop Album Chart and Puerto Rico Album Charts. It debuted at #5 on Billboard Latin Albums Chart and #89 on Mexico Top 100. It remain at #1 for 2 straight weeks on Puerto Rico Album Charts on its second week, and reached #72 on Mexico Top 100 on its third week.

== Charts ==
Chart	Peak position
U.S Billboard Top Latin Albums	5
U.S Billboard Latin Pop Albums	1
Mexico Top 100 Albums	72

== Certifications ==
Region	Certification	Certified units/sales
United States (RIAA)	Gold (Latin)	30,000^{‡}
^{‡} Sales+streaming figures based on certification alone.

== Awards/Nominations ==
Year	Awards ceremony	Award	Work	Result
2012	Latin Grammy Awards	Record of the Year	"Que Te Vaya Mal"	Nominated
2013	Grammy Awards	Best Latin Pop Album	"Kany Garcia" (album)	Nominated
2013	Latin Grammy Awards	Best Singer-Songwriter Album	"Kany Garcia" (album)	Nominated
2013	Latin Grammy Awards	Best Engineered Album	"Kany Garcia" (album)	Won

== Release history ==
Region	Date	Label	Format
Puerto Rico	July 30, 2012	Sony BMG	Standard/Deluxe
United States	July 31, 2012	Sony BMG	Standard/Deluxe
Latin America	July 31, 2012	Sony Norte	Standard/Deluxe
