= Latin Grammy Award for Best Singer-Songwriter Album =

Music award category

- Awarded for: quality albums composed at least 75 percent by a solo artist or duo
- Country: United States
- Presented by: The Latin Recording Academy
- First award: 2004
- Currently held by: Natalia Lafourcade – Cancionera (2025)
- Website: Latingrammy.com

The Latin Grammy Award for Best Singer-Songwriter Album is an honor presented annually at the Latin Grammy Awards, a ceremony that recognizes excellence and creates a wider awareness of cultural diversity and contributions of Latin recording artists in the United States and internationally. According to the category description guide for the 13th Latin Grammy Awards, the award is reserved for solo artists or duos and they "must compose and interpret 75 percent of the album on their own to be eligible in this category". Additionally, live albums are eligible if they contain at least 51 percent of new unreleased material released within the eligibility period.

The accolade for Best Singer-Songwriter Album was first presented to American performer and musician Soraya at the 5th Latin Grammy Awards in 2004 for her eponymous fourth studio album (2003). Peruvian singer-songwriter Gian Marco, Uruguayan singer-songwriter Jorge Drexler and Brazilian singer-songwriter Caetano Veloso hold the record for the most wins in this category, with three. Guatemalan singer Ricardo Arjona has the highest number of nominations without a single win, with four unsuccessful nominations. For the first time in the category's history, in 2011, a tie was declared with the award given to Peruvian artist Gian Marco for Días Nuevos and to Cuban artist Amaury Gutiérrez for Sesiones Intimas.

== Winners and nominees ==
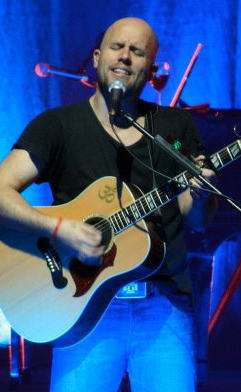
Peruvian singer Gian Marco was awarded in 2005, 2011, and 2012.

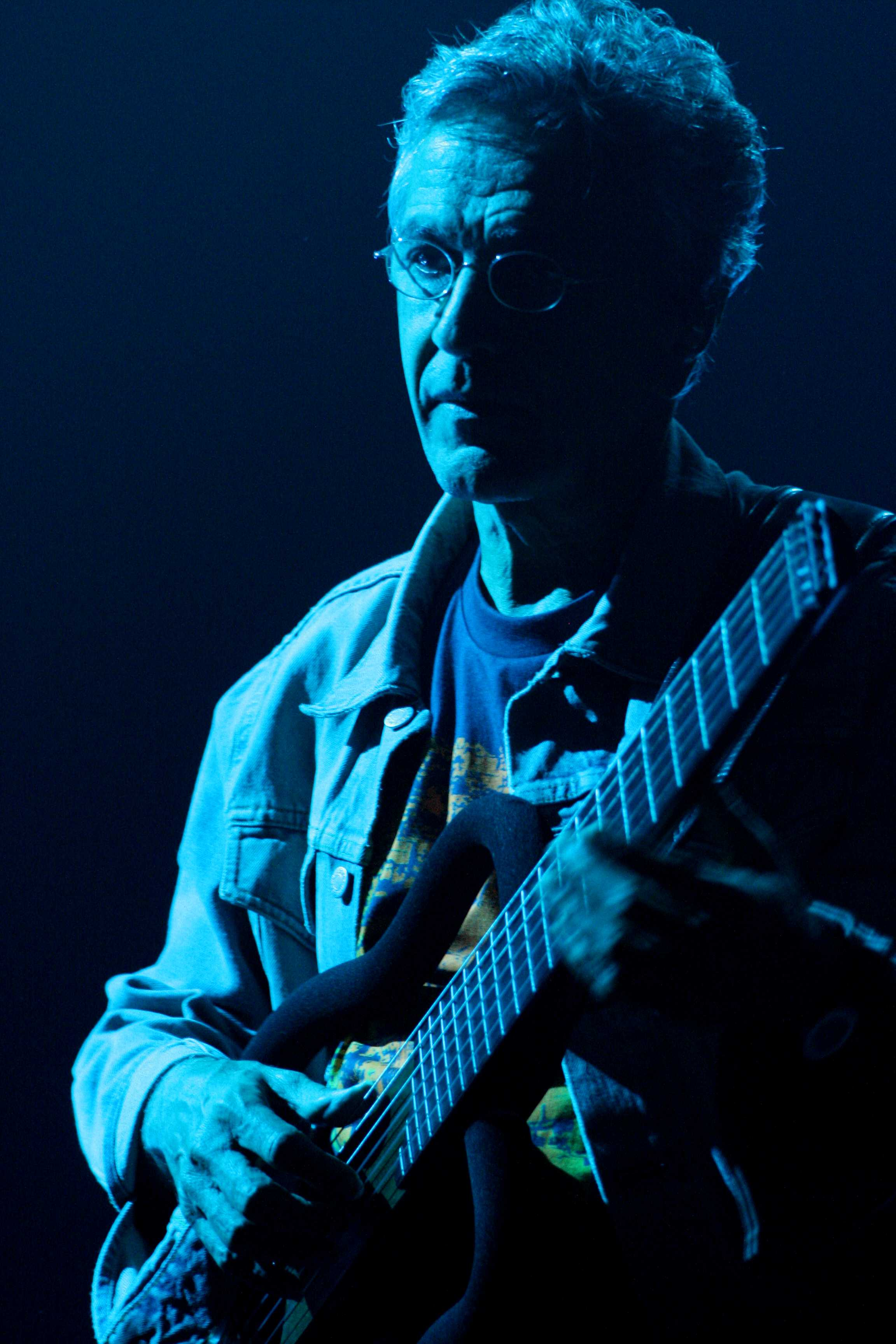
Brazilian performer Caetano Veloso was awarded in 2007, 2009 and 2013.

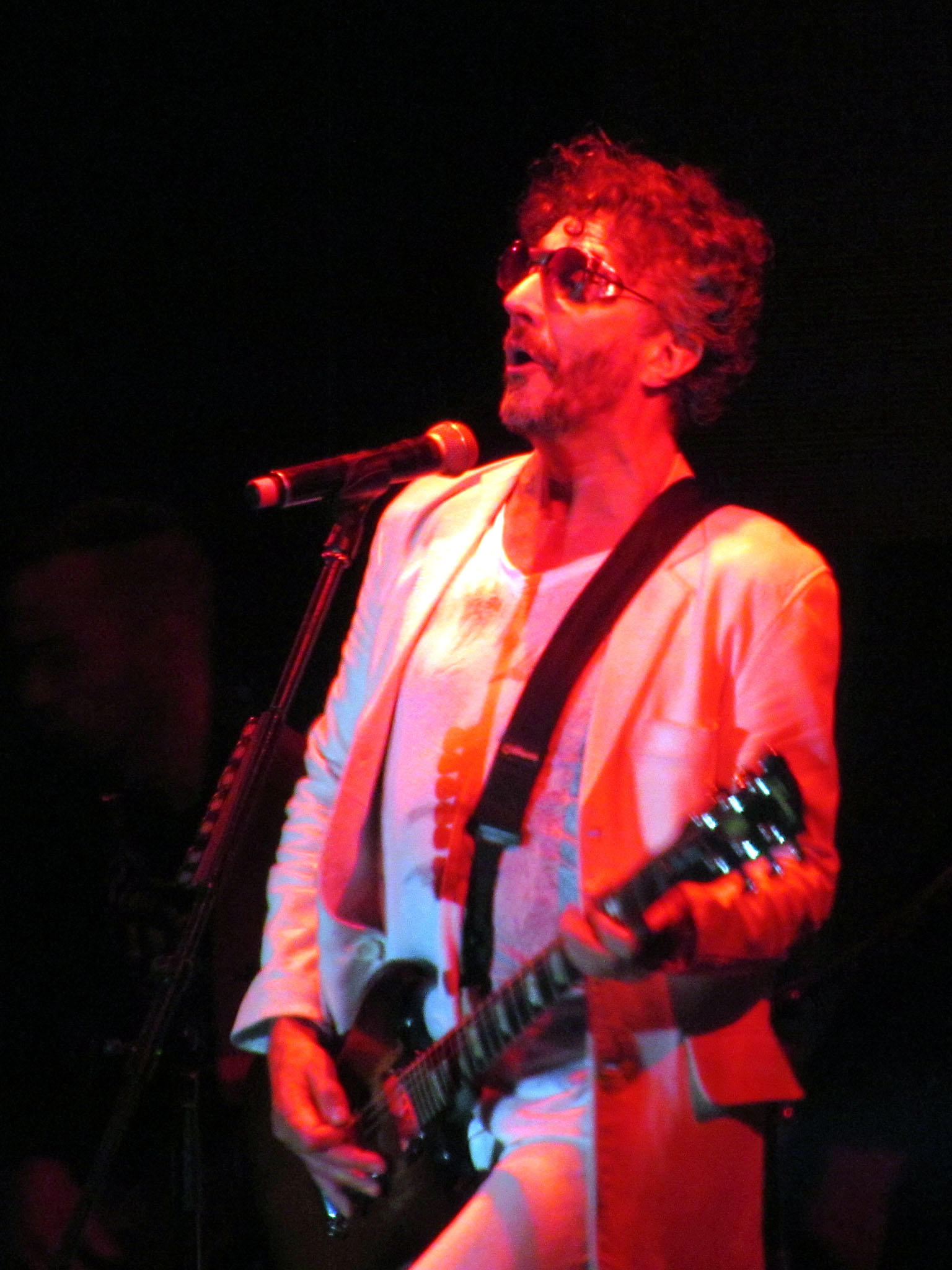
2008-winner Argentinian singer-songwriter Fito Páez.

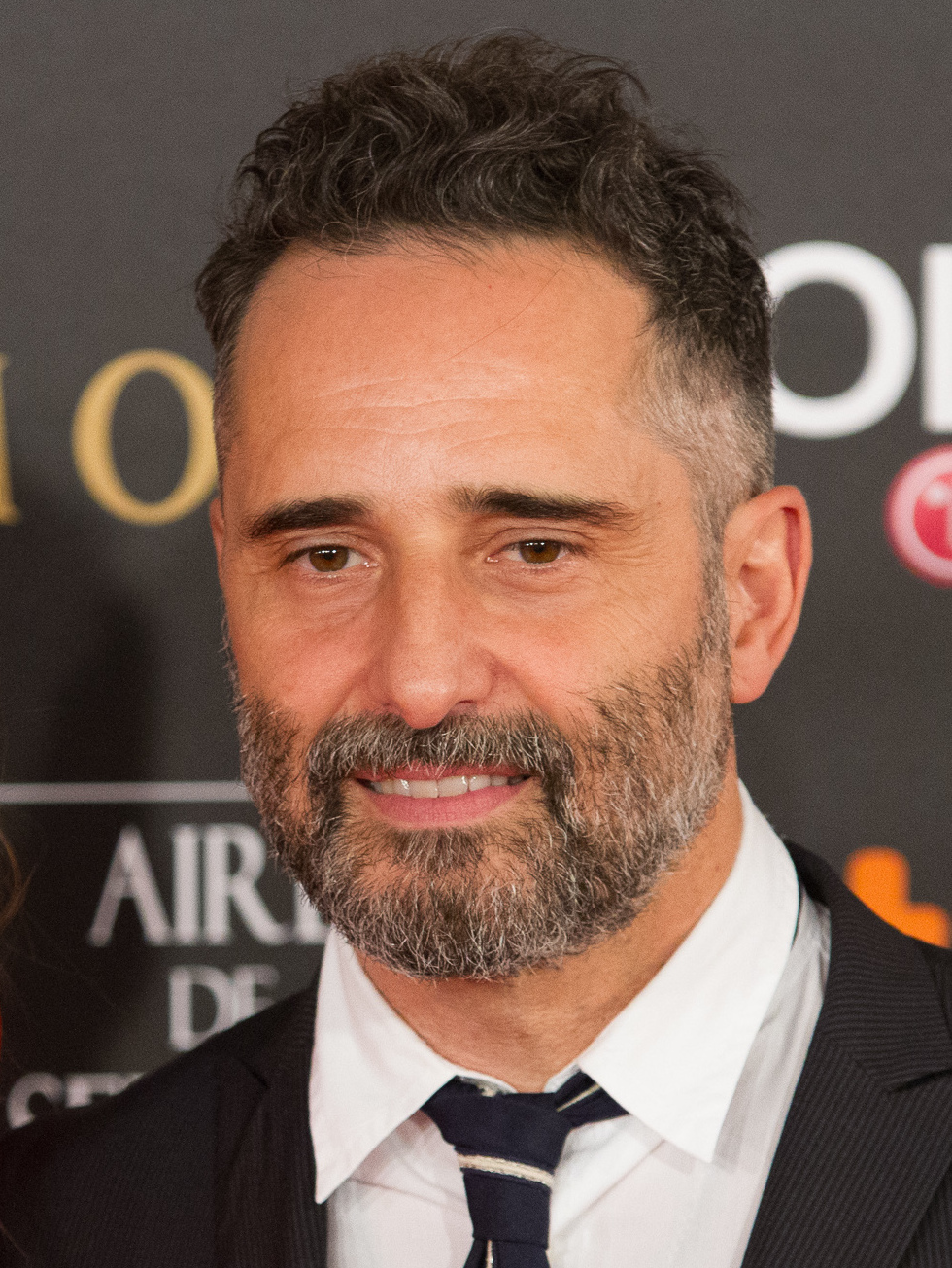
Three-time winner Jorge Drexler.

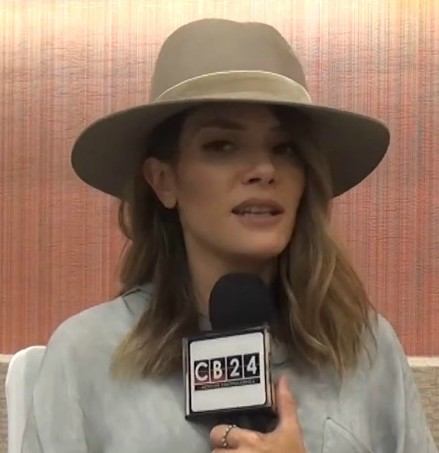
Puerto Rican singer-songwriter Kany García has won the award twice, in 2019 and 2020.

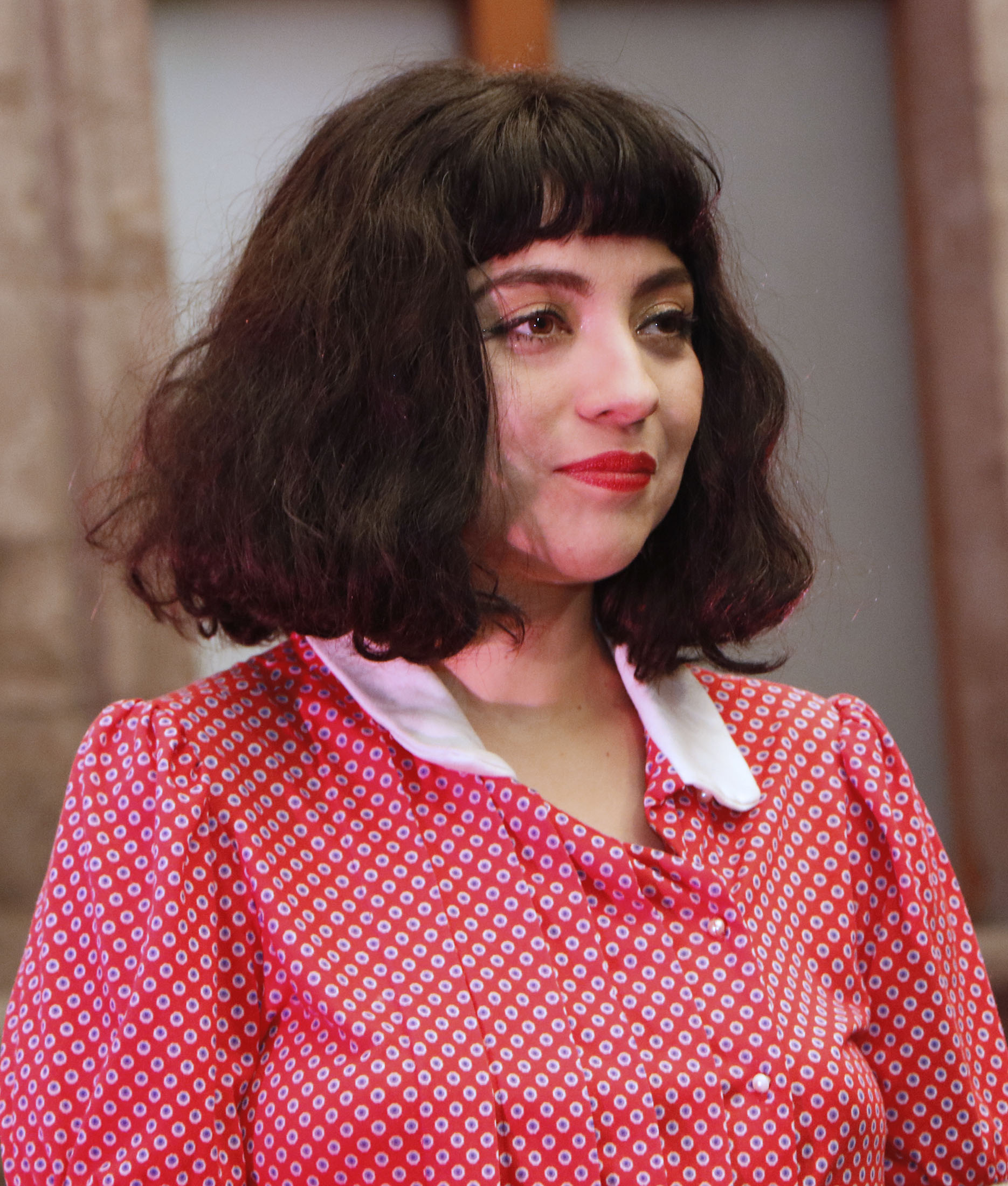
Chilean singer Mon Laferte won the award in 2021.

Year^{[I]}	Performing artist(s)	Work	Nominees^{[II]}	Ref.
2004	Soraya	Soraya	Juan Gabriel – Inocente de Ti; León Gieco – El Vivo de León; Alejandro Lerner – Bien Viaje; Joan Sebastian – Que Amarren a Cúpido; Joan Manuel Serrat – Serrat Sinfónico	
2005	Gian Marco	Resucitar	Djavan – Vaidade; Pedro Guerra – Bolsillos; Kevin Johansen – City Zen; Vicentico – Los Rayos	
2006	Pablo Milanés	Como un Campo de Maíz	Chico Buarque – Carioca; León Gieco – Por Favor, Perdón y Gracias; Ivan Lins – Acariocando; Joaquín Sabina – Alivio de Luto	
2007	Caetano Veloso	cê	Jorge Drexler – 12 Segundos de Oscuridad; Amaury Gutiérrez – Pedazos de Mi; José Luis Perales – Navegando Por Ti; Silvio Rodríguez – Érase Que Se Era	
2008	Fito Páez	Rodolfo	Djavan – Matizes; Gilberto Gil – Banda Larga Cordel; Pablo Milanés – Regalo; Tommy Torres – Tarde o Temprano	
2009	Caetano Veloso	Zii e Zie	Ricardo Arjona – 5to Piso; Franco De Vita – Simplemente la Verdad; Rosana – A Las Buenas y a las Malas; Tom Zé – Estudando A Bossa – Nordeste Plaza	
2010	Rubén Blades	Cantares del Subdesarrollo	Santiago Cruz – Cruce de Caminos; Jorge Drexler – Amar la Trama; Maria Gadú – Maria Gadú; Pavel Nuñez – El Tiempo del Viento; Silvio Rodríguez – Segunda Cita	
2011*	Amaury Gutiérrez	Sesiones Intimas	Ricardo Arjona – Poquita Ropa; Carlinhos Brown – Diminuto; Alberto Cortéz – Tener en Cuenta	
2011*	Gian Marco	Días Nuevos	Ricardo Arjona – Poquita Ropa; Carlinhos Brown – Diminuto; Alberto Cortéz – Tener en Cuenta	
2012	Gian Marco	20 Años	Ricardo Arjona – Independiente; Chico Buarque – Chico; José Luis Perales – Calle Soledad; Rosana – ¡¡Buenos Días, Mundo!!	
2013	Caetano Veloso	Abraçaço	Andrea Echeverri – Ruiseñora; Kany García – Kany García; Tommy Torres – 12 Historias; Yordano – Sueños Clandestinos	
2014	Jorge Drexler	Bailar en la Cueva	Ricardo Arjona – Viaje; Andrés Calamaro – Bohemio; Pablo Milanés – Renacimiento; Rosana – 8 Lunas	
2015	Alex Cuba	Healer	Santiago Cruz – Equilibrio; Leonel García – Amor Futuro; Marta Gómez – Este Instante; Gian Marco Zignago – #Libre	
2016	Manuel Medrano	Manuel Medrano	Francisco Céspedes – Todavía; Djavan – Vidas Pra Contar; Pedro Guerra – Arde Estocolmo; Kevin Johansen + The Nada – Mis Américas, Vol. 1/2; Alejandro Lerner – Auténtico	
2017	Vicente García	A La Mar	Alex Cuba – Lo Único Constante; Santiago Cruz – Trenes, Aviones y Viajes Interplanetarios; Erika Ender – Tatuajes; Debi Nova – Gran Ciudad	
2018	Jorge Drexler	Salvavidas de Hielo	El David Aguilar – Siguiente; Kany García – Soy Yo; Claudia Prieto – Compositores; Raquel Sofía – 2:00 AM	
2019	Kany García	Contra el Viento	Albita – Acústica; Leonel García – Amor Presente; Kevin Johansen – Algo Ritmos; Gian Marco – Intuición	
2020	Kany García	Mesa Para Dos	Alex Cuba – Sublime; El David Aguilar – Reciente (Adelanto); Debi Nova – 3:33; Yordano – Después de Todo	
2021	Mon Laferte	SEIS	AleMor – Alemorología; Alex Cuba – Mendó; Covi Quintana – Mañana Te Escribo Otra Canción; Rozalén – El Árbol y el Bosque	
2022	Jorge Drexler	Tinta y Tiempo	Caloncho – Malvadisco; El David Aguilar – Agendas Vencidas; Silvana Estrada – Marchita; Alex Ferreira – En lo Que Llega la Primavera; Pedro Guerra – El Viaje	
2023	Natalia Lafourcade	De Todas las Flores	Santiago Cruz – Nueve; Joaquina – Los Mejores Años; Maréh – Tierra de Promesas; Juan Carlos Pérez Soto – El Equilibrista	
2024	Leonel García	Pausa	El David Aguilar – Compita del Destino; El Riqué – Scratch de Versos; Nicolle Horbath – De Magia Imperfecta; Rozalén – El Abrazo	
2025	Natalia Lafourcade	Cancionera	Alejandro y María Laura – Dos Hemisferios; Valeria Castro – El Cuerpo Después de Todo; Vivir Quintana – Cosas Que Sorprenden a la Audiencia; Ale Zéguer – Relatos	

== Notes ==
^{^[I]} Each year is linked to the article about the Latin Grammy Awards held that year.
^{^[II]} Showing the name of the performer and the nominated album
