= Bajo el mismo Cielo =

Bajo el mismo Cielo may refer to:

- Bajo el mismo Cielo (song), a 2008 song by Kany García
- Bajo el mismo cielo (TV series), an American telenovela
