= Una Navidad con Gilberto =

Studio album by Gilberto Santa Rosa
- Released: October 14, 2008
- Recorded: 2008; Rolo Studios; Guaynabo, Puerto Rico
- Genre: Salsa
- Label: Sony BMG Norte
- Producer: Charlie Donato

Gilberto Santa Rosa chronology
Contraste (2007)	Una Navidad con Gilberto (2008)	Irrepetible (2010)

Singles from Una Navidad con Gilberto
- 1. "Me Gustan Las Navidades" Released: January 2009; 2. "La Fiesta No Es Para Feos" Released: January 2009

Una Navidad con Gilberto (A Christmas with Gilberto), is the title of a Christmas album released by Puerto-Rican singer Gilberto Santa Rosa on October 14, 2008, by Sony BMG Norte. It was the first time that Gilberto released his own Christmas album. He previous collaborated with various artists on the Tarjeta de Navidad by Sony Discos. In addition, he collaborated with Puerto Rican salsa group El Gran Combo de Puerto Rico on their album, Asi es Nuestra Navidad. The album peaked at number-six in the Billboard Top Latin Albums chart and number twenty-two on the Billboard Holiday Albums chart. It remained on the Top Latin Album charts for thirteen weeks. The album reached number-one on the Tropical Albums where it spent three weeks on the spot. At the Latin Grammy Awards of 2009, the album received a Latin Grammy Award for "Best Traditional Tropical Album".

The backup vocals includes Henry Santiago, Michelle Sotomayor, the producer Charlie Donato, Jerry Rivas of El Gran Combo de Puerto Rico, and Gilberto's protégé Víctor Manuelle. The latter composed the last track for the album, "La Navidad Más Larga". Dominican Republic singer appears as a guest on the medley, "Cascabel y Candela".

Two songs from the album were released as singles. The first single, "Me Gustan Las Navidades" ("I Enjoy the Holidays"), reached number-nine on the Billboard Latin Tropical Airplay chart. The second single, "La Fiesta No Es Para Feos" ("The Party Is Not For Ugly People"), reached number-seven on the Billboard Latin Tropical Airplay chart.

== Track listing ==
No.	Title	Writer(s)	Length
1.	"Me Gustan Las Navidades"	Emilio A. Vargas	4:31
2.	"El Año Viejo"	Crescencio Salcedo Monroy	4:32
3.	"Apaga La Luz"	Ramón Rodríguez	4:34
4.	"La Fiesta No Es Para Feos"	Wilfrido Guevara	4:47
5.	"Un Año Que Se Vá"	Juan José Hernández	4:55
6.	"Medley De Navidad: Cascabel/Candela"	Juan Angel Nogueras	4:21
7.	"La Medicina"	José A. Prieto	4:23
8.	"La Navidad Más Larga"	Víctor M. Ruiz	4:43

== Charts ==
=== Weekly charts ===
Chart (2008)	Peak position
US Top Holiday Albums (Billboard)	22
US Top Latin Albums (Billboard)	6
US Tropical Albums (Billboard)	1

=== Year-end charts ===
Chart (2009)	Position
US Top Latin Albums (Billboard)	65

== See also ==
- List of number-one Billboard Tropical Albums from the 2000s
