= Yo No Tengo Nah =

Single by Kany García
- Released: 11 October 2011
- Recorded: 2008
- Genre: Latin pop, Christmas
- Length: 3:53
- Label: Sony International
- Songwriter: Kany García

Kany García singles chronology
"Para Volver Amar" (2010)	"Yo No Tengo Nah" (2011)	"Que Te Vaya Mal" (2012)

"Yo No Tengo Nah" ("I have nothing") is a Christmas song written and performed by Kany García. The song is part of effort to raising funds to benefit substantially Psychopedagogical Institute of Puerto Rico, a place that houses children and adults with severe intellectual disability. "Yo No Tengo Nah" can only be obtained through digital download.

== Song Information ==
"Yo No Tengo Nah" talks about the custom that Puerto Rican families have to spend the holidays away from the island and plans to spend the best and funniest Christmas in Puerto Rico. People can only get the song in any of the Church's Chicken restaurants, Chili's, Pollo Tropical and Romano's Macaroni Grill, by making a donation of $2.00 to benefit the institute.

== Charts ==
Chart (2011)	Peak position
US Billboard Latin Pop Airplay	19

== Release history ==
Region	Date	Label	Format
Puerto Rico	11 October 2011	Sony International	Airplay / Radio
United States	13 November 2011	Sony BMG	Airplay / Radio
