= Como un Campo de Maíz =

Studio album by Pablo Milanés
- Released: Septiember 25, 2005
- Genre: Nueva canción, latin pop, trova
- Label: Universal Music Latino

Pablo Milanés chronology
En Vivo desde Nueva York (2005)	Como un Campo de Maíz (2005)	Regalo (2008)

Como un Campo de Maíz (Like a Cornfield) is an album released by Cuban singer-songwriter Pablo Milanés on September 25, 2005. The album earned Milanés a Latin Grammy Award for Best Singer-Songwriter Album.

== Track listing ==
This information adapted from Allmusic.

No.	Title	Writer(s)	Length
1.	"Yo No Sé"	Milanés, Sandra Pérez	2:56
2.	"Yo"	Milanés, Malvina Batista	2:43
3.	"Fabelo"	Milanés	3:25
4.	"He Sufrido Algo"	Milanés	2:29
5.	"Mi Esperanza"	Milanés, Carlos Miguel Núñez	3:08
6.	"Llévame Contigo Muerte"	Milanés	3:17
7.	"Réquiem Para un Amor"	Mércedes López, Milanés	2:18
8.	"El Sol Ríe por Mí"	Milanés	2:52
9.	"Sonidos del Alma"	Milanés, Pérez	2:25
10.	"Como un Campo de Maíz"	Milanés	3:12
11.	"Yo No Sé"	Milanés, Pérez	2:43
12.	"Para Mi Corazón Basta Tu Pecho"	Milanés, Pablo Neruda	2:52
