= Irrepetible =

Studio album by Gilberto Santa Rosa
- Released: June 29, 2010
- Genre: Salsa
- Length: 45:41
- Label: Sony Music Latin

Gilberto Santa Rosa chronology
| Una Navidad Con Gilberto (2008) | Irrepetible (2010) |

Irrepetible (English: Unrepeatable) is a studio album by Puerto Rican salsa music Gilberto Santa Rosa released on June 29, 2010. The album reached #1 on the Tropical Albums and the lead single "Vivir Sin Ti" reached #1 on Latin Tropical Airplay

== Album information ==
According to Santa Rosa, his decision to name the album Irrepitible was he that "never made a bad disc". The album contains guest stars including Latin pop singer Kany García, Johnny Ventura, and veteran salsa singer Rubén Blades. Originally, the album was stated to be an all-duet album but time constraints had forced Santa Rosa to work with those who is close to him. Irrepetible was announced on May 28, 2010. The first single, "Vivir Sin Ti" (To Live Without You), was released on July 6, 2010, and reached #1 on the Latin Tropical Airplay chart. The single did not perform well on the Top Latin Songs peaking at the bottom #50.

== Track listing ==
| No. | Title | Writer(s) | Length |
|---|---|---|---|
| 1. | "Vivir Sin Ti" | Rafi Monclova | 4:12 |
| 2. | "La Ventana" | Raul Paz | 4:21 |
| 3. | "¿Por Qué No Viene, Por Qué No Llama?" | Santiago Consuegra | 4:45 |
| 4. | "Y Tú y Yo (featuring Kany García) " | Rafi Monclova | 4:29 |
| 5. | "Aunque Llueva" | Juan José Hernandez | 4:14 |
| 6. | "Hay Que Dejarse de Vaina (featuring Johnny Ventura) " | Gilberto Santa Rosa | 4:18 |
| 7. | "Me Cambiaron Las Preguntas (featuring Rubén Blades) " | Rafi Monclova - Gilberto Santa Rosa | 6:25 |
| 8. | "Vodka con Limon" | Eddie Cruz | 4:10 |
| 9. | "Hoy, Por Siempre, y Para Siempre (featuring Pipe Pelaez) " | Felipe Pelaez Rodríguez | 4:33 |
| 10. | "Ella (featuring Guaco) " | José Alfonso Quiñones | 4:14 |
| Total length: | | | 45:41 |

== Reception ==
Professional ratings
Review scores
| Source | Rating |
|---|---|
| Allmusic | 4/5 stars |

Phil Freeman of Allmusic gave the album a four out of five praising the arrangements as "polished".

== Chart performance ==
Irrepetible became a #1 debut on the Tropical Albums on the week of July 17, 2010. For the Top Latin Albums chart, Irrepetible debuted and peaked on #3.

=== Weekly charts ===
| Chart (2010) | Peak position |
|---|---|
| Mexican Albums (AMPROFON) | 71 |
| US Top Latin Albums (Billboard) | 3 |
| US Tropical Albums (Billboard) | 1 |

=== Year-end charts ===
| Chart (2010) | Position |
|---|---|
| US Top Latin Albums (Billboard) | 68 |

== Certification ==
| Region | Certification | Certified units/sales |
|---|---|---|
| United States (RIAA) | Gold (Latin) | 30,000^{‡} |
^{‡} Sales+streaming figures based on certification alone.
