= Mesa Para Dos =

Studio album by Kany García
- Released: May 28, 2020
- Genre: Latin pop
- Length: 32:06
- Label: Sony Music Latin
- Producer: Julio Reyes Copello; Nicolás De la Espriella; Carlos Fernando López

Kany García chronology
Contra el Viento (2019)	Mesa Para Dos (2020)	El Amor Que Merecemos (2022)

Singles from Mesa Para Dos
- 1. "Lo Que en Ti Veo (featuring Nahuel Pennisi)" Released: May 28, 2020; 2. "Titanic (featuring Camilo)" Released: August 26, 2020; 3. "Búscame (featuring Carlos Vives)" Released: November 14, 2020

Mesa Para Dos (English: Table for Two) is the seventh studio album by Puerto Rican singer and songwriter Kany García, released on May 28, 2020 through Sony Music Latin. The album consists of ten songs, all of them collaborations with different Latin American artists such as Argentine singer Nahuel Pennisi, Chilean singer Mon Laferte, Spanish rock singer Leiva and Colombian singers Goyo from ChocQuibTown and Catalina García from Monsieur Periné, among others.

The album was mainly produced by Colombian record producer Julio Reyes Copello, who also produced her 2012 self-titled album, and was recorded at Copello's recording studio ArtHouse Records in Miami.

At the 21st Annual Latin Grammy Awards, the album was nominated for Album of the Year and won Best Singer-Songwriter Album, being the second time she had won the award after winning for Contra el Viento the previous year. Additionally, the song "Lo Que en Ti Veo" received nominations for Record of the Year and Song of the Year while the song "Búscame" was nominated for Best Tropical Song. The album also was nominated for the Grammy Award for Best Latin Pop or Urban Album at the 63rd Annual Grammy Awards.

== Track listing ==
Mesa Para Dos
No.	Title	Writer(s)	Producer(s)	Length
1.	"Lo Que en Ti Veo" (featuring Nahuel Pennisi)	Kany García	Julio Reyes Copello	3:26
2.	"Óxido" (featuring Leiva)	García, Leiva	Reyes Copello	3:04
3.	"Se Portaba Mal" (featuring Mon Laferte)	García	Reyes Copello	3:15
4.	"Que Pasen los Días" (featuring Gusttavo Lima)	García	Reyes Copello	3:10
5.	"Búscame" (featuring Carlos Vives)	García, Carlos Vives	Reyes Copello, Nicolás De la Espriella	2:37
6.	"Date la Vuelta" (featuring Reik)	García	Reyes Copello, De la Espriella	3:17
7.	"Nuevas Mentiras" (featuring Pedro Capó)	García	Reyes Copello, Carlos Fernando López	3:43
8.	"Acompáñame" (featuring Goyo and Catalina García)	García	Reyes Copello	2:46
9.	"Cobardes" (featuring Carlos Rivera)	García	Reyes Copello	2:46
10.	"Titanic" (featuring Camilo)	García, Camilo Echeverry	Reyes Copello	3:58
Total length:				32:06

== Charts ==
Chart performance for Mesa Para Dos
Chart (2020)	Peak position
US Latin Pop Albums (Billboard)	15

== Awards/Nominations ==
Year	Awards ceremony	Award	Work	Result
2021	Premios Juventud	La Mezcla Perfecta (Song with the Best Collaboration)	'Titanic' – Kany García & Camilo	Nominated
2021	Premios Juventud	Female Youth Artist of the Year	Kany Garcia	Nominated
2021	Premios Juventud	Album of the Year	"Mesa Para Dos"	Nominated
2021	Premios Juventud	Girl Power Song	“Se Portaba Mal” – Kany Garcia & Mon Laferte	Nominated
2021	Premios Lo Nuestro	Pop Artist of the Year	"Kany García"	Nominated
2021	Premios Lo Nuestro	Pop Album of the Year	"Mesa Para Dos"	Nominated
