= Duele Menos =

Single by Kany García

from the album En Vivo: Kany Garcia
- Released: May 27, 2014
- Recorded: 2013
- Genre: Latin Pop
- Length: 2:55
- Label: Sony BMG
- Songwriter(s): Kany García, Marcos Sanchez

Kany García singles chronology
"Adios" (2013)	"Duele Menos" (2014)	"Perfecto Para Mi" (2015)

Duele Menos (English: Hurts Less) is a Latin pop song written and performed by Kany García. The song was chosen as the first single from Kany's fourth studio album En Vivo: Kany Garcia. The song was released to digital outlets on May 27, 2014. The song debuted on iTunes Latin Charts at #28.

== Composition ==
Kany Garcia explains the reason for the song: "'Duele Menos' is the song for all ... We have all sprung things along the way: jobs, boyfriends, friends, colleagues, cities, lovers, hobbies. Whenever something or someone is left in the past, before the spectators show us strong, but we all have a day that we let ourselves be tempted by nostalgia. This song is the way to say I'm human, I feel alive and I allow myself. At some point in life we've all had this experience. It's a song full of strength."

== Music video ==
The video, directed by Kelvin Rosa and produced by LabTwenty, was filmed in the Emilio S. Belaval Theater at the University of the Sacred Heart in San Juan, Puerto Rico.

== Charts ==
Chart (2014)	Peak position
US Latin Pop Airplay (Billboard)	34
US Latin Airplay (Billboard)	39
US Latin Pop Digital Songs (Billboard)	19
