= El Amor Que Merecemos =

Studio album by Kany García
- Released: May 26, 2022
- Genre: Latin pop
- Length: 31 minutes
- Label: Sony Music Latin

Kany García chronology
Mesa Para Dos (2020)	El Amor Que Merecemos (2022)

Singles from El Amor Que Merecemos
- 1. "DPM (De Pxta Madre)" Released: September 9, 2021; 2. "Agüita e Coco" Released: January 20, 2022; 3. "Muero (featuring Alejandro Sanz)" Released: May 3, 2022

El Amor Que Merecemos (English: The Love That We Deserve) is the eighth studio album by Puerto Rican singer and songwriter Kany García, released on May 26, 2022, through Sony Music Latin. The album consists of ten songs, with 3 collaborations: Alejandro Sanz, Rozalén, and Jay Wheeler.

== Track listing ==
No.	Title	Length
1.	"Mi Plan De Vida"	3:00
2.	"DPM (De Pxta Madre)"	3:01
3.	"Pajaro Herido"	3:36
4.	"Supe Que Eras Para Mi"	3:26
5.	"Aguita E Coco"	2:56
6.	"Muero" (featuring Alejandro Sanz)	3:37
7.	"Sin Frenos"	2:44
8.	"Justito A Tiempo" (featuring Rozalén)	2:41
9.	"No Vuelvas" (featuring Jay Wheeler)	3:08
10.	"Me QUedo Sola"	2:27

== Charts ==
Chart performance for El Amor Que Merecemos
Chart (2022)	Peak position
Spanish Albums (Promusicae)	74
US Latin Pop Albums (Billboard)	15

== Certifications ==
Certifications for El Amor Que Merecemos
Region	Certification	Certified units/sales
United States (RIAA)	Gold (Latin)	30,000^{‡}
^{‡} Sales+streaming figures based on certification alone.

== Awards/Nominations ==
Year	Awards ceremony	Award	Work	Result
2022	Premios Juventud	Video with Best Social Message	“Dpm (De P*Ta Madre)”	Nominated
2022	Premios Juventud	Best Tropical Hit	“Agüita E Coco”	Nominated
