= Soy Yo (Kany García album) =

Studio album by Kany García
- Released: May 18, 2018
- Recorded: 2016–2017
- Genre: Latin pop
- Label: Sony Latin

Kany García chronology
| Limonada (2016) | Soy Yo (2018) | Contra el Viento (2019) |

Soy Yo (English: It's Me) is the fifth studio album by singer-songwriter Kany García. The album was released on May 18, 2018. The album debuted at number four on Billboard Latin Album charts. Soy Yo is Garcia's fifth top 10 effort, and marks just the second album by a woman to debut in the top five on Top Latin Albums in 2018. The album was included in Billboard magazine's "The 50 Best Albums of 2018 (So Far)". “Soy Yo” was included on Billboard's ”The 50 Best Latin Albums of the Decade”.

== Track listing ==
| No. | Title | Length |
|---|---|---|
| 1. | "Arriésgate a Intentarlo" |
| 2. | "Bailemos un Blues" |
| 3. | "A Mis Amigos" (with Melendi) |
| 4. | "Sin Tu Cariño" |
| 5. | "Confieso" |
| 6. | "Sácala a Bailar" |
| 7. | "Para Siempre" | 3:21 |
| 8. | "Soy Yo" |
| 9. | "Dejarte Ir" |
| 10. | "Que Viva la Gente" |
| 11. | "Banana Papaya" (with Residente) |

== Critical reception ==
The album debuted at number four on Billboard Latin Albums, number two on Billboard Latin Pop and number one in Puerto Rico Album charts with sales of 3,000 units (nearly all in album sales). The album was included in Billboard's "The 50 Best Albums of 2018 (So Far)" list.

According to Billboard:

The place of the Latin singer-songwriter, or cantautor, in contemporary Latin music has become somewhat diminished since reggaeton and urban music took over. Enter García, whose new album makes zero concessions to anything that's not her own brand of music (Residente collab "Banana-Papaya" notwithstanding). With the front-and-center vocals, lush acoustic arrangements, and intimate lyrics, Soy Yo reminds us of the depth to be found in the well of Latin music.

=== Accolades ===
Year-end lists
| Publication | Accolade | Rank/Recognition | Ref. |
|---|---|---|---|
| Billboard | 20 Best Latin Albums of 2018: Critics' Picks | 6 | |
| Billboard | Top Latin Albums 2018 | 96 | |
| RIAA | RIAA Latin Platinum Single | "Para Siempre" | |

== Charts ==
=== Weekly charts ===
| Chart (2018) | Peak position |
|---|---|
| US Top Latin Albums (Billboard) | 4 |
| US Latin Pop Albums (Billboard) | 2 |

=== Year-end charts ===
| Chart (2018) | Position |
|---|---|
| US Top Latin Albums (Billboard) | 96 |

== Certifications ==
| Region | Certification | Certified units/sales |
|---|---|---|
| Mexico (AMPROFON) | Gold | 30,000^{‡} |
| United States (RIAA) | Gold (Latin) | 30,000^{‡} |
^{‡} Sales+streaming figures based on certification alone.

== Awards and nominations ==
| Year | Category | Genre | Recording | Result |
|---|---|---|---|---|
Latin Grammy Awards
| 2018 | Song of the Year | Pop | "Para Siempre" | Nominated |
| 2018 | Album of the Year | General | Soy Yo | Nominated |
| 2018 | Record of the Year | General | "Para Siempre" | Nominated |
| 2018 | Best Singer-Songwriter Album | Singer-songwriter | "Soy Yo" | Nominated |
| 2019 | Best Short Form Music Video | Music Video | "Banana Papaya" | Won |
