= Boleto de Entrada =

2009 studio album by Kany García

Boleto De Entrada

Studio album by Kany García
- Released: September 22, 2009
- Recorded: March – May 2009
- Studios: The Hit Factory (Criteria); Studio On The Grove (Miami, Florida); Alfa Recording Studios (San Juan, Puerto Rico)
- Genres: Latin pop; Ska; latin rock; soft rock; Folk; latin ballad
- Length: 40:23 (Standard Edition); 49:38 (Deluxe Edition)
- Language: Spanish
- Label: Sony Music Latin
- Producers: Kany García; Andrés Castro; Rubén Leyva

Kany García chronology
| Cualquier Día (2007) | Boleto De Entrada (2009) | Kany García (2012) |

Singles from Boleto De Entrada
- 1. "Feliz" Released: July 27, 2009; 2. "Esta Vida Tuya Y Mía" Released: November 16, 2009; 3. "Para Volver a Amar" Released: April 5, 2010; 4. "Hoy" Released: October 4, 2010

Boleto De Entrada, (English: Entrance Ticket) is the second studio album recorded by the Latin Grammy winner, Puerto Rican-American singer-songwriter Kany García. It reached the top 10 of the album charts in both the United States Latin charts and #1 in Puerto Rico. The album witch released by Sony Music Latin on September 22, 2009 (see 2009 in music). The album witch produced by himself and co-produced by Andrés Castro and Rubén Leyva. On Wednesday, September 8, 2010, Boleto De Entrada received a nomination for the 2010 Latin Grammy Awards in the category of "Best Female Pop Vocal Album". This was García's second nomination in this category, she previously won in this category in 2008. Boleto De Entrada was nominated for a Grammy Award for Best Latin Pop Album in the 53rd Annual Grammy Awards held on Sunday, February 13, 2011.

== Album information ==
After a successful year, García entered the recording studio to record her second album. García described the album as more "pop, rock and soft ballads". García collaborated with Tego Calderón on the song "El Feo". With the duet, García explained that the song is ska and rock and is based on the history of a beautiful girl who falls in love with an ugly man.

García recorded some of the songs of her second album with Latin American instruments such as the Puerto Rican cuatro and tiple. The first single, "Feliz", has more of "Latin American" style and folk style. The song was inspired by an argument that García had with a friend of hers and while visiting Latin American countries when promoting her last album Cualquier Día.

García said of the album:

It's a happy album when we talk about the music, because it contains many elements. There are acoustic ballads, there are ballads with piano and strings, there are ballads with electric guitar and keyboard, some of them are good to dance, some sound very "fork", some others have a rock sound recreating the 50s, all of this make the album very happy in the musical part. But I say that it's not happy in general because if you hear the lyrics, it's a strong album, and some songs are "love ending" stories.

== Track listing ==
=== Standard Edition ===
| No. | Title | Composer: | Length |
|---|---|---|---|
| 1. | "Felíz" | Kany García | 2:38 |
| 2. | "Hasta Dónde" | Kany García | 3:13 |
| 3. | "Para Volver a Amar" | Kany García | 3:47 |
| 4. | "Eres Tú" | Kany García | 3:11 |
| 5. | "Esta Vida Tuya Y Mía" | Kany García | 3:48 |
| 6. | "12 de Noviembre" | Kany García | 3:14 |
| 7. | "Cuando Tú No Estás" | Kany García | 3:28 |
| 8. | "Dime la Verdad" | Kany García | 3:20 |
| 9. | "Mi Dueña" | Kany García | 3:36 |
| 10. | "Hoy" | Kany García | 3:23 |
| 11. | "Adónde Vas" | Kany García | 3:21 |
| 12. | "El Feo (featuring Tego Calderón)" | Kany García · Tego Calderón | 3:26 |

=== Deluxe edition ===
| No. | Title | Composer: | Length |
|---|---|---|---|
| 1. | "Felíz" | Kany García | 2:38 |
| 2. | "Hasta Dónde" | Kany García | 3:13 |
| 3. | "Para Volver a Amar" | Kany García | 3:47 |
| 4. | "Eres Tú" | Kany García | 3:11 |
| 5. | "Esta Vida Tuya Y Mía" | Kany García | 3:48 |
| 6. | "12 de Noviembre" | Kany García | 3:14 |
| 7. | "Cuando Tú No Estás" | Kany García | 3:28 |
| 8. | "Dime la Verdad" | Kany García | 3:20 |
| 9. | "Mi Dueña" | Kany García | 3:36 |
| 10. | "Hoy" | Kany García | 3:23 |
| 11. | "Adónde Vas" | Kany García | 3:21 |
| 12. | "El Feo (featuring Tego Calderón)" | Kany García, Tego Calderón | 3:26 |
| 13. | "Cuando Tú No Estás (Acoustic Version)" | Kany García | 3:37 |
| 14. | "No Quiero Escuchar Un No" | Kany García | 3:01 |
| 15. | "Pensar En Ti" | Kany García | 2:37 |

* Tracks confirmed by Amazon.com

== Reception ==
=== Critical response ===
Professional ratings
Review scores
| Source | Rating |
|---|---|
| Allmusic | 3.5/5 stars |

The album "Boleto de Entrada" has received mostly positive reviews.

- AllMusic review: "Garcia continues to evolve as a full-flavored artist on a record that mingles the melancholy majestic with the firestorms, the overarching pop with breezy power rock. Despite the album's title, Garcia is more a Spanish-language pop singer than a Latin popster. Although she does slip in a bolero or two, namely the comely "Esta Vida Tuya Y Mía", most of the tracks on the 2009 album reveal an artist weaned on the American Pop of the 90' from alternative soul, as she throws in everything from Indigo Girls-style folk ballads "Hasta Donde", to The Strokes-ish barroom indie-rock "Eres Tu" to new country balladry "12 de Noviembre" to Guy-level R&B seduction pieces "Cuando tu no Estas". It's an alluring and unpredictable, if heavily airbrushed, breakout."

== Singles ==
- "Feliz" is the lead single from Boleto De Entrada. It was released earlier to radio stations on July 27, 2009, and as a digital download on iTunes on same day. The song debuted on Billboard Latin Songs at #50 and on Billboard Latin Pop Airplay at #38. It reached #15 on Latin Tracks on where it became her first Top 20 on that chart and #4 on Latin Pop Airplay, being her 3rd Top 10 hit.
- The second single was chosen to be "Esta Vida Tuya Y Mía" and it was released on December 14, 2009. The song so far charted on Billboard Latin Pop Airplay at #14 becoming Kany's 4th Top 20 hit and charted at #39 on Latin Song Chart.
- The third single is "Para Volver a Amar". The song was sent to radio on April 12, 2010. The song reached at #21 on US Latin Pop Charts and top 5 in Puerto Rico

North America and Puerto Rico

- "Feliz"
- "Esta Vida Tuya Y Mía"
- "Para Volver a Amar"

Mexico and Latin America

- "Feliz"
- "Esta Vida Tuya Y Mía"
- "Para Volver a Amar"

== Tour ==
García's Boleto De Entrada Tour supported the album, and was presented by the "Oficina de la Procuradora de las Mujeres de Puerto Rico".

== Charts ==
| Chart | Peak position |
|---|---|
| U.S Billboard 200 Album | 193 |
| U.S Billboard Top Latin Albums | 6 |
| U.S Billboard Latin Pop Albums | 3 |
| Mexico Top 100 Albums | 71 |

== Certifications ==
| Region | Certification | Certified units/sales |
|---|---|---|
| United States (RIAA) | Gold (Latin) | 30,000^{‡} |
^{‡} Sales+streaming figures based on certification alone.

== Awards and nominations ==
| Awards ceremony | Award | Result |
|---|---|---|
| 2010 Latin Grammy Awards | Best Female Pop Vocal Album | Nominated |
| 2011 Grammy Awards | Best Latin Pop Album | Nominated |
| Premio Lo Nuestro | Female Pop Artist of the Year | Nominated |

== Release history ==
| Region | Date | Label | Format |
|---|---|---|---|
| Puerto Rico | September 18, 2009 | Sony BMG | Standard |
| Puerto Rico | September 21, 2009 | Sony BMG | Deluxe |
| United States | September 22, 2009 | Sony BMG | Standard |
| United States | September 22, 2009 | Sony BMG | Deluxe |
| Latin America | October 6, 2009 | Sony Norte | Standard/Deluxe |

== Credits and personnel ==
=== Personnel ===
- Vocals – Kany García
- Background vocals – Kany García, Tego Calderón
- Violin – Omar Velazquez
- Violocello – José Daniel de Jesús
- Bass/Guitar/Organ – Andrés Castro
- Electric guitar – Fernando Perdomo
- Piano/Keyboards – Xarah

=== Production ===
- Producer – Andrés Castro
- Co-producer - Kany García & Rubén Leyva
- Editor - Warner Chappell
- Director of artist & A&R- Paul Forat
- Coordination of A&R: Mauri Stern, Jorge Fonseca, Isabel de Jesus
- Recorded - The Hit Factory Studios (Miami), Studio On The Groove (Miami), ALFA Recording
- Director of Strings: Jose A Garcia
- Recording Engineers: Andres Saavedra, Orlando Vitto, Shafik Palis, Andrés Castro, Hector Iván Rosa ALFA, Gabriel Pena
- Mixing by - Andrés Castro
- Recording assistant (La Bodega) - Juan Barbosa
- Mix assistant (El Cielo Recording) - Lalo
- Mastering - Mike Marsh in The Exchange (London)

© MMIX. Sony Music Entertainment US Latin LLC.
