= Alguien =

2012 single by Kany García

Single by Kany García

from the album Kany García
- Released: July 10, 2012
- Recorded: 2010
- Genre: Latin Pop
- Length: 3:04
- Label: Sony BMG
- Songwriter: Kany García
- Producer: Julio Reyes Copello

Kany García singles chronology
"Que Te Vaya Mal" (2012)	"Alguien" (2012)	"Cuando Se Va El Amor" (2013)

Alguien (English: Someone) is a Latin pop song written and performed by Kany García. The song was chosen as the second single from Kany's third album, Kany García. The song was released to iTunes on July 10, 2012, as a promo and was released to radios in August.

== Composition and inspiration ==
La canción "Alguien" se inspiró en una relación que tuvo el hermano de Kany. Ella afirma: "Cuando alguien falla, creemos que nadie sufre como nosotros, que nadie ama más que nosotros"."

== Chart performance ==
"Alguien" debuted at #39 on Billboard Latin Pop Songs and #42 on Latin Songs on week ending September 14, 2012. So far, the song has peaked top 10 on Latin Pop Songs becoming Kany Garcia's 4th top 10 on that chart as well as first top 10 since 2009.

== Charts ==
Chart (2012/2013)	Peak position
Colombia (National-Report)	15
US Latin Songs (Billboard)	30
US Latin Airplay (Billboard)	33
US Latin Pop Airplay (Billboard)	8

== Other Versions ==
"Alguien (Bachata Version)"

Single by Kany García featuring Alexandra

from the album Kany García
- Released: December 10, 2012
- Recorded: 2012
- Genre: Latin pop, Bachata
- Length: 3:11
- Label: Sony BMG
- Songwriter: Kany García

A duet version was recorded with Bachata artist Alexandra. It was released for digital download on December 10, 2012.

== Track listing ==
1. "Alguien" (Album Version) - 3:04
2. "Alguien" (Radio Version) - 3:00
3. "Alguien" (Bachata/Duet Version) - 3:11
