= Estigma De Amor =

Single by Kany García

from the album Cualquier Día
- Released: September 16, 2008
- Recorded: 2006
- Genre: Latin Pop
- Length: 3:55
- Label: Sony BMG
- Songwriter: Kany García

Kany García singles chronology
"Esta Soledad" (2008)	"Estigma De Amor" (2008)	"Feliz" (2009)

"Estigma De Amor" is Latin Pop song written and performed by Kany García and fifth single of her debut album, Cualquier Día.

== Track listing ==
1. "Estigma De Amor": 3:55 (Album Version)

== Music video ==
The story of this music video is the beach scene of Guerrero in Mexico at different times of day, where the passing of the hours are combined with lyrics of this beautiful song, which emanate directly from the mind and heart of this wonderful singer. The music video for "Estigma De Amor" was shot at the beginning of October. The video was directed by Beto Hinojosa & Pablo Dávila.

== Chart performances ==
"Estigma De Amor" became Kany's fifth single from her debut album "Cualquier Dia". The song was only released to Puerto Rico and United States radio. The song debuted on Billboard Latin Pop Airplay at #38 and quickly starting charting higher where it reached #15. It became Kany third Top 20 hit on that chart. It also charted on Billboard Top Latin Songs at #43 becoming Kany's fourth Top 50 hit. It charted well on Kany homeland Puerto Rico, on where it hit #1 on their Top 50 songs with only 4 weeks on the chart. It did well on Puerto Rico's download charts, on where it landed at #3.

== Charts ==
Singles
Year	Chart	Position
2008	U.S Billboard Hot Latin Songs	43
2008	U.S Billboard Latin Pop Airplay	15

== Other Versions ==
- In 2012 a new version was included in Kany's self-titled album "Kany García", a duet with Antonia Carmona.
- A duet version was included in Kany's 2014 live album En Vivo: Kany Garcia which was recorded with her mother Shela De Jesus.

== Release history ==
Region	Date	Label
Puerto Rico	September 14, 2008	Sony BMG
United States	September 16, 2008	Sony BMG
Latin America	January 22, 2009	Sony BMG Norte
