= Cuando Se Va El Amor =

Single by Kany García

from the album Kany García
- Released: 2013
- Recorded: 2010
- Genre: Latin Pop
- Length: 4:09
- Label: Sony BMG
- Songwriter(s): Kany García
- Producer(s): Julio Reyes Copello

Kany García singles chronology
"Alguien" (2012)	"Cuando Se Va El Amor" (2013)	"Duele Menos" (2014)

Cuando Se Va El Amor (English: When love leaves) is a Latin pop song written and performed by Kany García. The song was chosen as the third single from Kany's third album, Kany García. The song was chosen as the third single via Kany's Facebook page.

== Charts ==
Chart (2013)	Peak position
Colombia (National-Report)	18
Spanish Contemporary	29
US Hot Latin Songs (Billboard)	31
US Latin Airplay (Billboard)	24
US Latin Pop Airplay (Billboard)	23

== Awards/Nominations ==
Year	Nominee / work	Award	Result
2014	Kany García	ASCAP Awards Latin Pop Song of the Year	Won
