= Contra el Viento =

Studio album by Kany García
- Released: May 17, 2019
- Recorded: 2018–2019
- Genre: Latin pop
- Label: Sony Latin

Kany García chronology
Soy Yo (2018)	Contra el Viento (2019)	Mesa Para Dos (2020)

Contra el Viento (English: Against the Wind) is the sixth studio album by singer-songwriter Kany García. The album was released on May 17, 2019. The album earned 2,000 album-equivalent units in the week ending May 23. The album was included in Billboard magazine's "The 50 Best Albums of 2019 (So Far)" list.

== Composition and production ==
Each track of Contra el Viento is preceded by a short, spoken-word intro. These commentaries were recorded by a range of women García identifies with, including Mercedes Sosa, Natti Natasha, Lila Downs, and Sofía Vergara. According to Billboard, the commentaries serve "as the framework for a deep dive into the full range of a personal evolution, going from loss and disillusionment to self-awareness, rebirth and finally, love again".

The album was produced by Marcos Sánchez and recorded by Orlando Di Pietro, Larry Coll, José E. Diaz, Orlando Ferrer, Harold W. Sanders, Ismar Colón and Daniel Bitran Arizpe.

== Track listing ==
No.	Title	Length
1.	"Así Voy Yo"	2:48
2.	"Remamos" (featuring Natalia Lafourcade)	3:49
3.	"Me Mudé"	3:16
4.	"Tu Amor Es Como Un Río"	3:45
5.	"Aunque Sea Un Momento"	3:37
6.	"Quédate" (featuring Tommy Torres)	3:19
7.	"La Libreta"	3:05
8.	"Mundo Inventado"	3:44
9.	"Solo Falta Que Llegues Tú"	3:20
10.	"Vivir Contigo"	3:20
11.	"Las Palabras" (featuring Fito Páez)	4:21

== Charts ==
Chart	Peak position
U.S Billboard Top Latin Albums	22
U.S Billboard Latin Pop Albums	3

== Awards and nominations ==
Category	Genre	Recording	Result
Latin Grammy Awards
Song of the Year	General	"Quédate" featuring Tommy Torres	Nominated
Best Singer-Songwriter Album	Singer-songwriter	"Contra el Viento"	Won
