= Cualquier Día =

2007 debut studio album by Kany García

Studio album by Kany García
- Released: July 10, 2007
- Recorded: 2006-2007
- Studios: La Bodega Studios (Mexico City, Mexico); Alfa Recording Studios (San Juan, Puerto Rico)
- Genres: Latin pop; ska; folk; soft rock; latin ballad
- Length: 38:01
- Language: Spanish
- Label: Sony BMG Norte
- Producers: Guillermo Gil; Pancho Ruíz; Mario Santos

Kany García chronology
Cualquier Día (2007)	Boleto De Entrada (2009)

Alternative cover
- Mexican edition cover

Singles from Cualquier Día
- 1. "Hoy Ya Me Voy" Released: May 14, 2007; 2. "¿Qué Nos Pasó?" Released: September 3, 2007; 3. "Amigo en el Baño" Released: February 4, 2008; 4. "Esta Soledad" Released: April 28, 2008; 5. "Estigma De Amor" Released: September 1, 2008

Cualquier Día (English: Any Day) is Latin Grammy winning album and debut Spanish album recorded by the Puerto Rican-American singer-songwriter Kany García. It reached the top 10 of the Latin Pop album charts in the United States, top 50 in Mexico and #1 in Puerto Rico. The album witch released by Sony BMG Norte on July 10, 2007 (see 2007 in music) and produced by Guillermo Gil, Pancho Ruíz and Mario Santos. It was released to critical acclaim.

== Album information ==
When Kany was introduce and sang to Franco De Vita, she was later signed to SONY BMG. Later that year she started recording her debut album. Cualquier Día was recorded in both Mexico and Puerto Rico, with the help of music producer Memo Gil. All the songs in the album were written by García herself. The album was released in July 2007, and already was receiving great response by the critics. According to Kany, the album is "a disc with 11 different stories, inspired by everyday things, from love stories to disaffection."

The album produced five singles so far: "Hoy Ya Me Voy", "¿Qué Nos Pasó?", "Amigo en el Baño", "Esta Soledad", and "Estigma De Amor". All five songs have received heavy airplay in Kany's homeland Puerto Rico and in the states. The album was certified Disco de Oro by the RIAA for selling more than 100,000 in United States was also certified "Disco De Oro" by AMPROFON in Mexico for selling over 50,000 in that country alone.

On September 10, 2008, the album received four nominations for the 2008 Latin Grammy Awards. It was nominated for "Album of the Year" and "Best Female Pop Vocal Album", and the lead single Hoy Ya Me Voy, received a nomination for "Song of the Year" while Kany herself, is nominated for "Best New Artist". On November 11, 2008 Kany won the Latin Grammys for "Best New Artist" and " Best Female Pop Vocal Album".

== Track listing ==
All tracks by Kany García

#	Title	Length
1	"Esta Soledad"	3:12
2	"Estigma De Amor"	3:55
3	"Amigo en el Baño"	3:26
4	"Hoy Ya Me Voy"	3:57
5	"Mujer de Tacones"	3:15
6	"¿Adónde Fue Cecilla?"	4:12
7	"Te Vuelvo a Ver"	3:28
8	"¿Qué Nos Pasó?"	3:24
9	"Carla Se Fue"	3:11
10	"Si Ya No Estás Conmigo"	3:16
11	"Todo Basta"	3:28

== Critical reception ==
Professional ratings
Review scores
Source	Rating
Billboard	(positive)

The review of the album by Billboard Magazine:

Singer/songwriter Kany García's confessional rock debut is a welcome major-label departure from Latin pop divadom. Her husky tone seems built for a sideways glance at breakups, sex, aging and human indifference, but it's the album's uptempo tracks that really leave an impression. García's sudden bursts of anger are a dose of good sassy fun, especially on the country-tinged "Amigo en el Baño", a darkly funny tune about a vibrator, and the brisk rocker "Mujer de Tacones", in which she declares she's "tired of looking at myself in the mirror . . . because in my early 20s, you've made me feel so wrinkled." García shows she's got some lyrical moxie here, and with a few more memorable arrangements to match, her incisive ballads could have even wider appeal. Here's hoping her eloquence strikes a chord."

A review from El Nuevo Herald:

Kany Garcia has given the public a record 100% of pop ballads, the spark that imposes its staff, with a sexy accent, while both mature. "Cualquier Día" is a disk to give to devote to hear again and again and be identified."

== Singles ==
=== Hoy Ya Me Voy ===
"Hoy Ya Me Voy" was the lead single from Cualquier Dia. It was released earlier to radio stations on May 14, 2007, and as a digital download on iTunes on same day. The music video was shot in Mexico and was directed by Alexis Gudino."Hoy Ya Me Voy" became Garcia's second highest peaking single since reaching number 22 on the Billboard Top 50 Latin Songs. The song won a Billboard Latin Music Award for "Latin Pop Airplay Song of the Year, New Artist", and it was nominated for "Song of the Year" at this year's Latin Grammy Awards.

=== ¿Qué Nos Pasó? ===
"¿Qué Nos Pasó?" was released for radio airplay in the US, and was the second single from the album. It reached at number 22 on the Billboard Latin Pop Airplay chart.

=== Amigo en el Baño ===
"Amigo en el Baño" was officially released for radio airplay in the U.S. on February 4, 2008. The music video for the song premiered in March on Puerto Rico's late night TV Show, No Te Duermas. It reached the Top 50 on Billboard Top Latin Songs, becoming Garcia's second song to chart.

=== Esta Soledad ===
"Esta Soledad" became the fourth single of Cualquier Dia. The song became Garcia's highest peaking song in the United States, reaching at #21 on Billboard Hot Latin Songs and #6 on Billboard Latin Pop Airplay.

=== Estigma De Amor ===
"Estigma De Amor" is the fifth and final single from Cualquier Dia. The song was sent to radio on September 1, 2008. The song debuted on Billboard Latin Pop Airplay at #38, and is currently at #15 becoming Kany's third Top 20 Hit on that chart. It also charted on Billboard Hot Latin Songs at #43.

== Cualquier Dia: Edicion Especial ==
Cualquier Día: Edicion Especial

Studio album by Kany García
- Released: October 21, 2008
- Genre: Latin pop
- Language: Spanish
- Label: Sony BMG Norte
- Producer: Guillermo Gil

The album Cualquier Dia was re-released with three songs performed acoustic with visual materials showing the making of and it also includes all the four music videos released so far. The album was released in United States and Puerto Rico only. The new edition of the album was released on October 21, 2008.

=== Track listing ===
Disk 1:

1. "Esta Soledad"
2. "Estigma de Amor"
3. "Amigo en el Baño"
4. "Hoy Ya Me Voy"
5. "Mujer de Tacones"
6. "¿Adónde fue Cecilia?"
7. "Te Vuelvo a Ver"
8. "¿Qué Nos Pasó?"
9. "Carla Se Fue"
10. "Si Ya No Estas Conmigo"
11. "Todo Basta"

Disk 2:

1. "Bienvenida" (Video)
2. "Todo Basta" (Acoustic Video)
3. "Hoy Ya Me Voy" (Acoustic Video)
4. "Te Vuelvo A Ver" (Acoustic Video)
5. "Que Nos Pasó?" (Music Video)
6. "Amigo en el Baño" (Music Video)
7. "Esta Soledad" (Music Video)
8. "Hoy Ya Me Voy (Music Video)

== Release history ==
Region	Date	Format
Puerto Rico	July 6, 2007	Regular
Puerto Rico	October 20, 2008	Special
United States	July 7, 2007	Regular
United States	October 21, 2008	Special
Chile	August 7, 2007	Regular
Columbia	August 13, 2007	Regular
Mexico	September 8, 2007	Regular
Spain	October 8, 2007	Regular
Argentina	October 15, 2007	Regular

== Awards ==
Awards ceremony	Award	Result
2008 Latin Billboard Music Awards	Latin Pop Album of the Year, New Artist	Won
2008 Latin Grammy Awards	Album of the Year	Nominated
2008 Latin Grammy Awards	Best Female Pop Vocal Album	Won

== Chart performance ==
Cualquier Día debuted on Billboard Top Latin Albums at #72 and quickly rose to #48. The album charted well on Billboard Latin Pop Albums on where it charted at #10. The album was certified Disco De Oro (Gold Album) by the RIAA. In Latin America, the album debuted at #84 on Mexico Album Charts. Months after being on the charts, the album quickly jumped to #41. It was later certified Disco de Oro, for shipments of 50,000 in Mexico alone. It has spent over 35 weeks in the chart.

== Charts ==
Chart	Peak position
U.S Billboard Top Latin Albums	48
U.S Billboard Latin Pop Albums	10
U.S Billboard Top Heatseekers	39
U.S Billboard Top Heatseekers (South Atlantic)	1
Mexico Top 100 Albums	41

== Sales and certifications ==
Region	Certification	Certified units/sales
Mexico (AMPROFON)	Gold	40,000^{^}
United States (RIAA)	Platinum (Latin)	60,000^{‡}
^{^} Shipments figures based on certification alone.^{‡} Sales+streaming figures based on certification alone.

=== End of the year charts ===
Year-End Chart
Chart	Position
Mexico Top 25 Albums of 2008	10

== Personnel ==
=== Production ===
- Vocals – Kany García
- Producer – Guillermo Gil
- Co-producer - Pancho Ruiz & Mario Santos
- Director of artist - Paul Forat & José Gazmey
- A&R - Charlie García
- Recorded - La Bodega, México. D.F.
- Mixing (place) - El Cielo Recording Studio Monterrey, México
- Mixing by - Memo Gil
- Recording assistant (La Bodega) - Juan Barbosa
- Mix assistant (El Cielo Recording) - Lalo
- Mastering - Güicho Gil en El Cuarto de Máquinas México, D.F.
- Composer/songwriter - Kany García
- Editor - Warner Chappell
