= Feliz (song) =

Single by Kany García

from the album Boleto De Entrada
- Released: July 22, 2009
- Recorded: 2008
- Genre: Latin pop
- Length: 2:38
- Label: Sony BMG
- Songwriter: Kany García
- Producers: Andrés Castro and Kany García

Kany García singles chronology
"Estigma De Amor" (2009)	"Feliz" (2009)	"Esta Vida Tuya Y Mía" (2010)

"Feliz" (English: Happy) is a Latin pop song written and performed by Kany García. The song was chosen as the first single from Kany's second album, Boleto De Entrada. The song was released to radio on July 22, 2009.

== Composition and inspiration ==
The song "Feliz" as it was told by Garcia herself, is influence by Latin American music. Garcias says "It is a celebration, a feast, and in some ways, reflects the mood of the album". The song was inspired by an argument that Kany had with one of her friend.

=== New version ===
A new version of "Feliz" was recorded during the month of November to be released during Christmas time in the month of December. The new version was created in four countries. Andrés Castro, producer of the song and the album "Boleto De Entrada", recorded the guitars, bass, and the broader elements while visiting Colombia. The mixing took place in the United States, and Kany lend her voice to the song while promoting the album in Mexico. The final mix took place via the web. Kany on the new version:

I was fascinated by how and to be honest, I prefer this version because it is more effective for people, gives you much more joy and the fact that this had the fourth song enlivens.

— Kany García

== Reception ==
- Univision.com gave the song a positive review, saying "It is a sample of the state of spirit by the one that crosses the singer, leaves to see its jollier side and stands out the security of the one that enjoys at present, without leaving behind the romanticism that has characterized it since her début."
- Billboard praised the song calling it a "bold choice for a single and a catchy song with a rhythm that borders on reggae-lite." Also stating "the Puerto Rican singer/songwriter's sharply observant lyrics and pained, husky voice are a satisfying contrast to the bouncy acoustic pop behind it. García does bittersweet very well, and she's capable of conveying hurt feelings with subtlety in her vocals even while ostensibly giving someone the finger in verse."

== Music video ==
The music video for "Feliz" was shot in some cities in New York. The visual was recorded in Williamsburg, one of the most artistic and popular areas of Brooklyn. The video includes bright colors and animation effects, an ideal environment for the song. It was shot using stop-motion animation and features García celebrating her newfound freedom. She rides the subway, flies through an alleyway and rolls around in Brooklyn Bridge Park. It starts with Kany leaving an apartment, walking into the streets of New York. The video is set in slow motion with different colors and pictures of the word "Feliz" in every object around: "Billboard, Sand, ect". The music video was directed by Picky Talarico.

== Track listing ==
All tracks by Kany García

US Promo CDR

1. "Feliz" (Radio Edit) – 2:37
2. "Feliz" (Main Version) – 2:39
3. "Feliz" (Digital Version) – 2:38

== Chart performance ==
"Feliz" made its impact into Billboard Latin Songs at #50 and stayed there for 15 weeks until it reached #15, where it became Kany's first Top 20 hit on that chart. On the Billboard Latin Pop Airplay, it debuted at #38. It reached #4 on Latin Pop Airplay, becoming her 3rd Top 10 hit. It was a huge hit in Puerto Rico, on where it hit #1 and stay at that position for weeks.

== Charts ==
Chart (2009)	Peak position
U.S. Billboard Hot Latin Tracks	15
U.S. Billboard Latin Pop Airplay	4
Spanish Pop Chart	3
Spanish Contemporary Chart	7

=== Year-end charts ===
Charts	Peak position
U.S. Billboard Hot Latin Tracks	94
U.S. Billboard Latin Pop Airplay	34

== Release history ==
Region	Date	Label	Format
Puerto Rico	July 20, 2009	Sony BMG	Radio
Puerto Rico	August 14, 2008	Sony BMG	Digital Download
United States	July 22, 2009	Sony BMG	Radio
United States	August 18, 2009	Sony BMG	Digital Download
Latin America	July 22, 2009	Sony BMG Norte	Radio
