= Que Te Vaya Mal =

Single by Kany García

from the album Kany García
- Released: April 24, 2012
- Recorded: 2011
- Genre: Latin Pop
- Length: 2:33
- Label: Sony BMG
- Songwriter(s): Kany García
- Producer(s): Julio Reyes Copello

Kany García singles chronology
"Yo No Tengo Nah" (2011)	"Que Te Vaya Mal" (2012)	"Alguien" (2012)

"Que Te Vaya Mal" (English: May Things Go Poorly For You) is a Latin pop song written and performed by Kany García. The song was chosen as the first single from Kany's third album, Kany García. The song was released to radio on April 23, 2012.

== Composition and inspiration ==
With almost 2 years out of the music, Kany returns with "Que Te Vaya Mal", the first single of her comeback album "Kany García". The song "Que Te Vaya Mal" was inspired by a friend of Kany, who got her heart broken. Kany says about the song, "We all know someone who we wish the worst, so this song is for them." The song has sounds of Hawaiian ukulele base cumbia and ska combined with a Colombian papayera, similar to Mexican bands, that feeds on wind instruments, brass and percussion. The song was released to radio stations on April 23, 2012.

== Live performances ==
Kany performed "Que Te Vaya Mal" for the first time live at the 2012 Premios Juventud on July 19, 2012.

== Awards/Nominations ==
Awards ceremony	Award	Nominated work	Result
2012 Latin Grammy Awards	Record of the Year	Que Te Vaya Mal	Nominated
