= Esta Vida Tuya Y Mía =

Single by Kany García

from the album Boleto De Entrada
- Released: January 12, 2010
- Recorded: 2008
- Genre: Latin pop
- Length: 3:48
- Label: Sony BMG
- Songwriter(s): Kany García
- Producer(s): Andrés Castro and Kany García

Kany García singles chronology
| "Feliz" (2009) | "Esta Vida Tuya Y Mía" (2010) | "Para Volver a Amar" (2010) |

"Esta Vida Tuya Y Mía" (English: This Life Yours and Mine) is a Latin pop song written and performed by Kany García. The song was chosen as the second single from Kany's second album, Boleto De Entrada. The song was released to radio in United States and Puerto Rico on January 12, 2010.

== Charts ==
| Chart (2010) | Peak position |
|---|---|
| U.S. Billboard Hot Latin Songs | 39 |
| U.S. Billboard Latin Pop Airplay | 14 |
| Spanish Contemporary Chart | 26 |
