= Esta Soledad =

Single by Kany García

from the album Cualquier Día
- Released: May 7, 2008 USA
- Recorded: 2006
- Genre: Latin pop
- Length: 3:12
- Label: Sony BMG
- Songwriter: Kany García

Kany García singles chronology
"Amigo en el Baño" (2008)	"Esta Soledad" (2008)	"Estigma De Amor" (2008)

"Esta Soledad" ("This loneliness") is a Latin pop song written by Kany García for her first studio album Cualquier Día. It was released as the album's fourth single in May 2008. The song is used as the theme song for the Mexican telenovela, Todo por Amor. The song was performed live at the 2008 Latin Grammy Awards. In 2012, Kany re-recorded "Esta Soledad" and made a duet with Dani Martin as part of her third album "Kany Garcia".

== Music video ==
The music video for "Esta Soledad" was shot in Buenos Aires, Argentina. The video starts off with Kany standing in front of a bench while people on the back, in slow motion and fast forward walk. Scenes show Kany playing the guitar in her bed. Other shows Kany and her love interest in a park recording with a home camera.
Later, Kany is seen in a bar. Kany is seen standing in the middle of flying birds, and the streets while cars pass. The video ends with Kany staring at the camera with her hair in rewind motion, falling back down to her face.

The music video was filmed in various natural settings of Buenos Aires, Argentina, and captures, with novel special effects, the human and melancholy atmosphere of Kany. The video was directed by Claudio Diavela who has worked with international artists like Alejandro Fernández, Chayanne, and Diego Torres.

== Track listing ==
1. "Esta Soledad": 3:12 (album version)

== Chart performances ==
"Esta Soledad" debuted strong on the Billboard charts. It debuted at #15 on Billboard Latin Pop Airplay, and on the second week it jumped to #10. On Billboard Hot Latin Songs, it debuted at #44, and jumped 14+ spaces to land at #30 the following week. So far it has peaked at #21 on Billboard Latin Songs, and #6 on Billboard Latin Pop Airplay. The song has become a Top 5 hit on United States Latin Contemporary Radios. The song was the Most Added song in Latin Pop radio in United States for three consecutive weeks.

== Charts ==
Singles - (world wide)
Year	Chart	Position
2008	US Billboard Hot Latin Songs	21
2008	US Billboard Latin Pop Airplay	6

=== End of year chart ===
Year-End Chart
Year	Chart	Position
2008	US Billboard Latin Pop Airplay (Year-End Chart)	38
