= Limonada (album) =

2016 studio album by Kany García

Studio album by Kany García
- Released: November 19, 2016
- Recorded: 2014–2015
- Genres: Latin pop, rock, folk
- Length: 35 minutes (Standard Edition)
- Label: Sony Music Latin

Kany García chronology
En Vivo (Kany García album) (2015)	Limonada (2016)	Soy Yo (2018)

Singles from Limonada
- 1. "Perfecto Para Mi" Released: October 2, 2015; 2. "Cómo Decirle" Released: March 18, 2016; 3. "Aqui" Released: June 16, 2016; 4. "Me Pregunto" Released: November 18, 2016

Limonada (English: Lemonade) is the fourth studio album by singer-songwriter Kany García. The album was released on November 19, 2016. It debuted at number one on the United States Billboard Top Latin Albums chart, selling over 2,000 copies in its first week. The album subsequently became García's first number one album. The album remained at the top of the charts for 2 straight weeks.

== Album information ==
García remarks about the album:

Limonada is the most refreshing beverage and this is the most refreshing album that I have made. The album is about having a positive outlook in life, and how you can fight your battles making the best lemonade with the lemons life gives you in this journey.

== Track listing ==
No.	Title	Writer(s)	Length
1.	"Mio"	Kany García, Pablo Preciado, Román Torres	3:01
2.	"De verano a invierno"	Kany García, Rosana Arbelo	3:26
3.	"Perfecto para mi"	Kany García, David Kahne	2:53
4.	"El mejor"	Kany García, Claudia Brant	3:08
5.	"Aquí" (ft. Abel Pintos)	Kany García, Pablo Preciado, Román Torres	3:12
6.	"Peligro de extinción"	Kany García, David Kahne	2:49
7.	"Me pregunto"	Kany García	2:56
8.	"Cómo decirle"	Kany García, Tommy Torres, David Kahne	4:00
9.	"Yo quiero bailar"	Kany García, Claudia Brant, David Kahne	2:46
10.	"Libre"	Kany García, David Kahne	2:38
11.	"Limonada"	Kany García, Pablo Preciado, Román Torres	3:21

== Singles ==
Info:

- "Perfecto Para Mi"

Chart	Peak position
U.S Billboard Latin Pop Airplay	33

- "Como Decirle"

Chart	Peak position
U.S Billboard Latin Pop Airplay	32
U.S Billboard Latin Airplay	44

- "Aqui" feat. Abel Pintos

Chart	Peak position
U.S Billboard Latin Pop Airplay	31

- "Me Pregunto"

Did not chart.

== Charts ==
Chart	Peak position
U.S Billboard Top Latin Albums	1
U.S Billboard Latin Pop Albums	1

== Tour ==
García played a 5 date tour to support the album between January 2017 and July 2017. She played one date in each venue; San Juan, Puerto Rico, Guatemala City, Guatemala, San José, Costa Rica, Orlando, USA, Santo Domingo, Dominican Republic.
