= Hoy Ya Me Voy =

Single by Kany García

from the album Cualquier Día
- Released: 7 May 2007 (United States)
- Recorded: 2006
- Genre: Latin pop
- Length: 3:57
- Label: Sony BMG
- Songwriter(s): Kany Garcia

Kany García singles chronology
"Hoy Ya Me Voy" (2007)	"¿Qué Nos Pasó?" (2007)

"Hoy Ya Me Voy" ("Today I Leave") is a Latin pop song and the first single of Puerto Rican new artist Kany García, from her debut album Cualquier Día. The song has received heavy airplay in Puerto Rico. The song received a nomination for the Latin Grammy Song of the Year. A new version of the song was included in Kany's self-titled album Kany García, a duet with Kany's musical godfather, Franco De Vita.

== Song information ==
This song as of Garcia, tells the story of an unrequited love, there comes a point where one of the two people have to say goodbye and depart. "Hoy Ya Me Voy" was one of the first song Kany wrote for her debut album. The song became Kany's breakthrough single. The song became a worldwide hit. It receive nominations for many awards and nominations including Latin Grammys a nomination for Song of the Year and Billboard Latin Music Awards, winning "Latin Pop Airplay Song of the Year, New Artist".

== Music video ==
"Hoy Ya Me Voy" is Kany's first music video. The concept of the video just Garcia in a movie set. The video starts off Kany laying on a sofa singing wearing a dress and hat. As she walks towards the camera, she starts taking the dress off, revealing a top and a mini skirt. She follows the camera while playing with her guitar name Gibson. The video ends with the face of Kany in black and white. The music video was shot in one continuous shoot. The video was made in Churubusco, México, a legendary movie set and was directed by Alexis Gudino. In Kany's word, she wanted the video to be simple, a video that her fans could enjoy.

The video received airplay in MTV Tr3s, hTV, Pepsi Musica and became an instant hit on Mun2s Top 20 videos. It received heavy rotation in Univision morning countdown.

== Track listing ==
1. "Hoy Ya Me Voy": 3:57 (album version)
2. "Hoy Ya Me Voy": 3:50 (radio version)

== Chart success ==
"Hoy Ya Me Voy" proved to be a moderate success in the Latin charts in the United States, peaking within the top 25 of the Billboard Hot Latin Songs and top five in Billboard Latin Pop Airplay which helped Kany win the 2008 Billboard Latin Music Awards for "Latin Pop Airplay Song of the Year, New Artist". "Hoy Ya Me Voy" entered the Billboard Hot Latin Songs at number 42, it moved to number 22 the following week and fell off two spaces the next week. The song stayed in Billboard Hot Latin Songs for 13 non-consecutive weeks.

== Charts ==
Singles – (worldwide)
Year	Chart	Position
2007	US Billboard Hot Latin Tracks	22
2007	US Billboard Latin Pop Airplay	4

=== End of year charts ===
Year-end chart
Year	Chart	Position
2007	US Billboard Latin Pop Airplay (year-end chart)	35

== Awards ==
Year	Award	Result	Category
2008	Billboard Latin Music Awards	Won	Latin Pop Airplay Song of the Year, New Artist
2008	Billboard Latin Music Awards	Nominated	Latin Pop Airplay Song of the Year, Female
2008	Latin Grammy Awards	Nominated	Song of the Year
