= Para Volver a Amar =

Single by Kany García

from the album Boleto De Entrada
- Released: May 18, 2010
- Recorded: 2008
- Genre: Latin pop
- Length: 3:47
- Label: Sony BMG
- Songwriter(s): Kany García
- Producer(s): Andrés Castro and Kany García

Kany García singles chronology
"Esta Vida Tuya Y Mía" (2010)	"Para Volver a Amar" (2010)	"Yo No Tengo Nah" (2011)

"Para Volver a Amar" (English: In Order to Love Again) is a Latin pop song written and performed by Kany García. The song was chosen as the third single from Kany's second album, Boleto De Entrada. The song was released to radio on May 18, 2010.

== Background ==
The song "Para Volver a Amar" was chosen to be the theme song for the new campaign for the Office of Women of Puerto Rico against domestic violence. This new campaign is to alert young women about the physical and emotional abuse.

"It is an honor, more than anything is a very big challenge. I belonged to different campaigns, but this is the most commitment and responsibility. For the first time I can not only attract the public with my music that follows me, but also come to bring a social message where we tell women "You're worth it." Do not allow physical or emotional abuse in your dating relationship, "urged the young singer at a press conference.."

— Kany García

The song was also chosen to be the theme song for the Mexican telenovela, titled "Para Volver A Amar". The song was also chosen in Puerto Rico to be the theme song for the first 60 episodes of the Colombian telenovela Doña Bella.

== Track listing ==
US Promo CDR

1. "Para Volver a Amar" (Radio Edit) – 3:35
2. "Para Volver a Amar" (Main Version) – 3:47
3. "Para Volver a Amar" (Digital Version) – 3:40

== Music video ==
The music video for "Para Volver a Amar" was filmed in Puerto Rico and was directed by William “Pipo” Torres. The video is part of an educational campaign of the attorney of women in Puerto Rico. With the video and song, Garcia seeks to bring a crucial message for these times: that violence against women is unacceptable. The music video was filmed on May 25, 2010 The concept of the music video is very simple, shot on a set with a white background. It shows Kany in two different outfits, playing the guitar in some parts of the video. Throughout the song, lyrics are being display in the background. The music video is followed with a commercial with Kany talking about domestic abuse.

== Awards/Nominations ==
Awards ceremony	Award	Result
Premios TVyNovelas	Best Theme Song	Nominated

== Chart performance ==
"Para Volver a Amar" was released to radios on May 18, 2010 and made its debut on the charts the following week. On Billboard Latin Pop charts, it debuted at #39, with the following week jumping 12 spaces to land at #27. It stayed at the same position for 2 weeks, on where later it landed at #22. In Puerto Rico, the song has peaked within the top 20.

== Charts ==
Chart (2010)	Peak position
Spanish Contemporary Chart	27
US Billboard Latin Pop Airplay	21
