= Amigo en el Baño =

Single by Kany García

from the album Cualquier Día
- Released: February 2008 USA
- Recorded: 2006
- Genre: Latin pop, Latin rock
- Length: 3:26
- Label: Sony BMG
- Songwriter: Kany Garcia

Kany García singles chronology
"Bajo el mismo Cielo" (2008)	"Amigo en el Baño" (2008)	"Esta Soledad" (2008)

"Amigo en el Baño" ("My friend in the bathroom") is a Latin pop song written by Kany García for her first studio album Cualquier Día. It was released as the album's third single in early 2008. The song has become Kany's signature song. The song has become Kany's second song to appear in Billboard Hot Latin Songs. The song was later covered by Dominican Merengue artist Juliana O'Neal in merengue version.

== Composition and inspiration ==
"Amigo en el Baño" is a song written by Kany Garcia. The lyrics were written for a music class assignment but later released on Kany's debut album "Cualquier Día". The song has been labeled as "taboo" for its lyrics. Billboard.com says about the song "Garcia's sudden bursts of anger are a dose of good sassy fun, especially on the country-tinged "Amigo en el Baño", a darkly funny tune about a vibrator." According to Kany, the song is about a woman finding happiness after being left by a man. It is the first single to bear elements of country/rock music.

== Music video ==
=== Original video ===
The music video was shot in a bathroom. The video starts off with Kany in the bathroom singing and flirting to the mirror. Later on, scenes show Kany singing and later she appears with her band performing the song. Different girls appear in the end of the music video singing the lyrics to "Con mi Amigo en el Baño". The words "Por Que?, No lo Pierdas, and Valio la Pena", were written on the mirror, as if Kany wrote them because of the heat in the bathroom.

The music video was shot in Puerto Rico and was directed by Pedro Juan Hernandez. In Kany's words, she wanted to keep the video PG because she knows that even though the song is very 'riskee', she still has young fans that might be watching it. The music video premiered in No Te Duermas, a late-night TV show in Puerto Rico.

The music video has become Kany's second music video to receive airplay in MTV Tr3s, Mun2, Univision, and hTV. Not only the video has become famous but it has become a fan's favorite especially by the women.

=== Animated version ===
An animated music video of "Amigo en el Baño" was released over YouTube and later over iTunes. The video shows an animated Kany finding her boyfriend with another woman in bed. She then goes to a store and buys a vibrator who comes to life. The vibrator gets into a fighting ring with Kany's ex and fights him. Later both Kany and the vibrator go out to eat, then dance together and later head home where she is confronted by her ex-boyfriend. The video ends with the animated Kany giving birth to small 'vibrators'. The music video was Kany's first video to chart on iTunes Top 100 Latino Music Videos, where is currently on #39. The music video has been watched by over 5 million on YouTube. The video has an Explicit label on it.

== Cover versions ==
- Dominican merengue artist Juliana recorded the song in merengue version used it in her album. The song topped Merengue Charts in Dominican Republic.
- Salsa artist Víctor Manuelle sang the song in many of his concerts.

== Controversy ==
The song has been received praised by fans and some critics but not all. The song has received heavy airplay in Dominican Republic on where it has been requested over 20x per day, mostly by women. The director in Espacio FM, 96.9 FM, a radio station in Santo Domingo writes "Leaving that the women are the ones that more listen to music "Mi Amigo en el baño" has become a success, but do not you create that there has not been contrary reactions. There are men that have called and they have complained and they have asked that if they stop playing the song. I would say that is not strong, is a reality that we all know, what happens is that is told in a song, but there are things that in companies as ours still is preserve", maintains Caesar Rosary, director of Space FM. "Mi Amigo en el baño" arrived at the programming of the stations by initiative of the own commentators that saw the possibility to conquer the public with the same one, due to the controversial content of the lyrics." This controversy has led people to come up with the solution to remove the song from airwaves but not every fan is happy.

== Track listing ==
1. "Amigo en el Baño": 3:26 (album version)

== Chart performance ==
The song became Kany's second song to break into Billboard Latin Songs at #44. The song has reach so far #22 in Billboard Latin Pop Airplay. The song became an instant hit on Dominican Republic radios, where it reached #1 and stayed there for 5 consecutive weeks. It also hi #1 in the country of Costa Rica for several weeks.

== Charts ==
Singles - (worldwide)
Year	Chart	Position
2008	US Billboard Hot Latin Songs	44
2008	US Billboard Latin Pop Airplay	22
