= Kany García =

Puerto Rican singer and songwriter (born 1982)

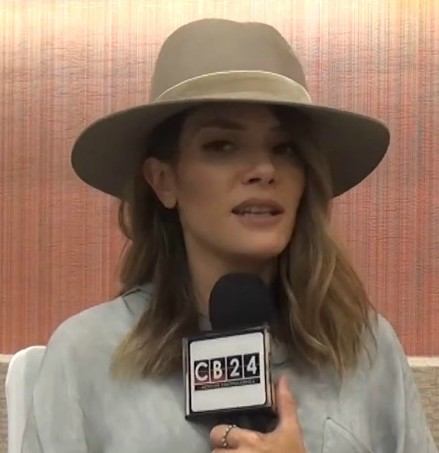
- García in 2019

Background information
- Born: Encarnita García de Jesús; September 25, 1982 (age 44); Toa Baja, Puerto Rico
- Origin: Toa Baja, Puerto Rico
- Genre: Latin pop
- Occupations: Singer; songwriter
- Instruments: Vocals; guitar; cello
- Years active: 2006–present
- Label: Sony BMG (2006–present)
- Spouse(s): Carlos Padial (m. 2010; div. 2013) Jocelyn Troche (m. 2019)
- Website: kanygarcia.com (in Spanish and English)

Encarnita García de Jesús (born September 25, 1982), better known as Kany García, is a Puerto Rican singer and songwriter. Born in Toa Baja, Puerto Rico, García first appeared on television in 2004 as a contestant on Objetivo Fama. She is widely considered the most successful non-winner in the history of the show.

In 2006, García signed a recording contract with Sony BMG, releasing her debut album Cualquier Día (2007), which was a commercial success, spawning four top 40 singles on the Billboard Latin Tracks. She has won six Latin Grammy Awards out of twenty nominations and has been nominated for three Grammy Awards.

== Biography ==
Encarnita García de Jesús was born on September 25, 1982, in Toa Baja, Puerto Rico. Her father, Antonio García, was a Roman Catholic priest from Spain. He left the priesthood when he fell in love with Kany's mother, Puerto Rican choir director Shela de Jesús. She has two uncles on her father's side who are also priests. García has two older siblings: Marishela and José Antonio, who is the lead double-bass player at the Sinfónica de Puerto Rico. She began studying classical music when she was a child, learning cello, musical theory, solfeggio and chorus. At 13, she attended the school Escuela Libre de Música, where the guitar would win her heart. This was followed by studies at Puerto Rico's Conservatorio de Música.

In her early twenties, following a successful audition for the Puerto Rican television program Objectivo Fama, García fell asleep behind the wheel, barely surviving a near-fatal car accident. The hospital stay cost her the opportunity to appear on Objetivo Fama. She suffered fractures of the pelvis and clavicle and needed forty stitches on her face. She was in intensive care for some time and managed to recover, although sensation in her left toe is limited. This setback did not keep García from the craft that she loved. Continuing to write and perform led to talks with Sony BMG some years later. While García was still being courted by the music industry superpower, Sony invited her to share the stage with Venezuelan singer Franco De Vita at an engagement in Puerto Rico. Her performance was met so warmly, garnering the evening's only standing ovation, that an offer from Sony was quickly forthcoming. She released her first studio album in 2007 titled Cualquier Dia, which she wrote all songs. The album was certified gold in both, United States and Mexico. The album was released to critical acclaim. Kany's second album "Boleto De Entrada" was released in September 2009.

== Music career ==
=== 2006–2008: Cualquier Día ===
Kany García started recording her debut album during the beginning of 2006. García's debut album, Cualquier Día(lit. Any Day), was released on July 7, 2007, yielding five singles, the first being "Hoy Ya Me Voy" which was released on May 7, 2007. The single became a huge success upon its release peaking at number 22 in the US on Billboard Hot Latin Songs charts. It also became a global hit where it peaked within the top 10 across 4 countries as well as achieving top 20 charts on countries around the world. The single written by Kany herself was described by Billboard Magazine as a "beautiful song that changes the meaning of a break-up". The second single "¿Qué Nos Pasó?" wasn't as successful as her previous release, failing to chart on the U.S. Billboard Hot Latn Tracks, however, it became her second consecutive song to reach the Top 30 on Billboard Latin Pop Airplay. In Mexico, Ecuador and in Colombia the single proved to be well received, reaching the top 50 in those countries. It reached the Top 10 in Puerto Rico. The third single, "Amigo en el Baño (lit. Friend in the Bathroom)", was less successful in the states, but a moderate hit in Latin America. The lyrics were written for a music class assignment but later released on Kany's debut album "Cualquier Dia". The song was released in the beginning of February but by the beginning of March, radios stopped playing the songs because some people felt offended. Even though some radios did not play the songs, the song managed to reach the top 50 on Billboard Hot Latin tracks where it peaked at #44 after Kany's performance at the 2008 Latin Billboard Music Awards. It also charted at #22 on the Latin Pop charts. It was a huge success in Dominican Republic, and in Costa Rica where it reach #1 for weeks in both countries.

Later that year, García was asked to write the theme song for the HBO Latino TV show Capadocia. The song is called "Bajo el mismo Cielo". The song was praised by music critics and fans. Kany's fourth single "Esta Soledad", became Kany's best charting song in U.S. The song has peaked at #21 on Billboard Latin Tracks. The song was the most added song on Latin Pop Radio for 4 consecutive weeks. Kany was proclaim by Billboard Magazine, as their 2008 Breakthrough New Artist. Since its release, the album reached the top 10 in U.S. Latin Pop Charts, and has reach the top 50 on Mexico Album Charts. It gained Oro certification from the RIAA for selling 100,000 units. García received the first Gold Disk recognition of her career on July 22, 2008. Sony BMG gave her the award live in "Anda Pal' Cara, En Gala". A special edition of the album "Cualquier Dia" was released on October 21, 2008. The new album "Cualquier Dia: Edicion Especial" included live songs, 4 music videos, pictures, and a video showing Kany's road to success.

On September 10, 2008, Kany received 4 nominations for the 2008 Latin Grammy Awards in the categories of: "Song of the Year", "Album of the Year", "Best New Artist" and "Best Female Pop Vocal Album". The fifth single of Cualquier Dia is "Estigma De Amor". On October 3, 2008, García offered her first big concert of her tour in Mexico with over 3,000 attendees. "Estigma De Amor" debuted on Billboard Latin Pop Airplay at #38 and reached #15 becoming Kany's 3rd Top 20 hit. It also charted on Billboard Hot Latin Songs at #43, her 3rd song to enter the chart. Kany's voice, lyrics and music has been compared with others like Shakira and Julieta Venegas. On November 11, 2008, Kany was awarded two Latin Grammys for "Best New Artist" and "Best Female Pop Vocal Album". Kany also performed her hit single "Esta Soledad". The album was certified "Disco De Oro" on November by AMPROFON in Mexico for selling over 50,000 in that country alone.

=== 2009–2011: Boleto De Entrada ===
After a successful year, Kany entered the recording studio to record her second album. Garcia started recording new songs, a song called "Todavia", is one of those new songs that will appear on her second album. Kany says about the song that "speaks a little of everything that we still need to be done ... so many trips we have done and what we're back in a myriad of things." According to Kany herself, the album will be more "pop, rock and soft ballads". Garcia is also looking to collaborate with other musicians. She wants a duet with some of her favorite artists like Julieta Venegas, Reyli, Juan Luis Guerra or if the song is in English, with John Mayer. She says that she has written many songs for her next project. Kany received her first nomination for the 2009 Premio Lo Nuestro Awards. She was nominated for "Female Pop Artist of the Year". Kany teamed up with fellow musician, reggaeton artist Tego Calderón for a duet for his upcoming album El Que Sabe, Sabe. The song is about a "young girl suffering from sexual abuse".

Kany released her first single from her second album Boleto De Entrada, the song is called "Feliz". The song has so far peaked at #5 on Billboard Latin Pop Airplay chart becoming her 3rd Top 10 song and #15 on Latin Song chart. Kany was part of a tribute album for Spanish Artist Rocío Dúrcal. She sang a duet in the song "Infiel". She released her second album Boleto De Entrada. The album debuted at #6 on Billboard Latin Albums and #3 on Billboard Latin Pop Album, becoming Kany's first top 10 album on Latin Album chart and second on Latin Pop chart. Kany joined forces with international recording artists Reyli, Gian Marco and ex-band member of Sin Bandera, Noel Schajris to create a song for Teleton 2009. The song was created to raise money for kids in Mexico. The song is titled "No hay imposibles". The second single, "Esta Vida Tuya Y Mía" was released on January 12, 2010. The song did not get any promotion or music video as Kany was preparing for her tour. Even with no promotion behind it, the song manage to chart on the states and in Puerto Rico. The song charted at #39 on Billboard Hot Latin Songs and #14 on the Pop charts. In May of that year, Kany became part of an educational campaign of the attorney of women in Puerto Rico, regarding domestic violence. A song of her second album, "Para Volver a Amar" was chosen as the theme song that will represent the cause. The song was released to radios on May 18, 2010. It impacted the Latin charts the following week on where it debuted at #39 on Billboard's Latin Pop charts, it reached #22. Kany can be heard in Gilberto Santa Rosa's new album Irrepetible on a track titled "Y tú y yo". On September 8, 2010, Boleto De Entrada received a nomination for the 2010 Latin Grammy Awards in the category of "Best Female Pop Vocal Album".

=== 2012–2014: Kany García ===
In December 2011, Kany released a Christmas song titled "Ya No Tengo Nah'". with funds being donated to charity. On April 24, 2012, Kany released her first single of her third studio album Kany García. The song is titled Que Te Vaya Mal. Kany performed the single for the first time live on "Premios Juventud". The album "Kany García" was released on July 31, 2012. The album debuted at #1 in Puerto Rico, #5 on US Latin Albums, #1 on US Latin Pop, and #72 in Mexico. Kany released her second single "Alguien" in August and the single became Kany's 4th song to reach top 10 on Billboard Latin Pop Songs where it reached #8. On September 25, Kany's first single "Que Te Vaya Mal" from her third album, was nominated for "Record of the Year" for the 2012 Latin Grammy Awards. The album was nominated for "Best Latin Pop Album" at the 2013 Grammy Awards. On January 1, 2013, Kany announced the release of her third single "Cuando Se Va El Amor. The single charted within the top 40 on the Billboard Latin charts. Kany released her fourth single "Adios" in May 2013. The album "Kany Garcia" received 2 nominations for the 2013 Latin Grammy Awards, "Best Singer-Songwriter Album" and "Best Engineered Album", taking the Grammy under the "Engineered" category.

=== 2014–Early 2016: En Vivo: Kany Garcia ===
Following up the success of her third studio album Kany Garcia, Kany got to work on her fourth studio album. She released the first single "Duele Menos", of her live album "En Vivo: Kany Garcia" on May 27, 2014. Kany released her fourth and first live album En Vivo: Kany Garcia on August 19, 2014. Kany received her highest-charting album to date with "En Vivo" on Billboard's Top Latin Albums. The album debuted at #4, with 2,000 copies sold in its first week. Kany released the music video to "Pasaporte" on February 14, 2015. She joined forces with Tego Calderon, and recorded a duet for his new album, titled "Y Quién Diría".

=== 2016– 2018: Limonada and Soy Yo ===
García collaborated with producer David Kahne. This makes it the first time David works with a Latin artist. On October 2, 2015, Kany released her first single of her fourth studio album, the song titled "Perfecto Para Mi". The song was released to radio and all digital platforms. The album "Limonada" was released on May 20, 2016. The album debuted at #1 on Billboard Top Latin Albums, selling over 2,000 copies on the first week. This is Kany's first #1 album on that chart.

Kany then began work on her 5th studio album in 2017. On February 16, 2018, she released the first single "Para Siempre". The song was recorded in Puerto Rico. The music video was filmed in late 2017 in Madrid, Spain with director Rubén Martín. The new album titled "Soy Yo" was released May 18, 2018. The album debuted at #4 on Billboard Latin Album charts. Soy Yo is Garcia's fifth top 10 effort, and marks just the second album by a woman to debut in the top five on Top Latin Albums in 2018.

=== Songwriting ===
Kany Garcia has written all the songs for her albums. She has also written songs for other artists such as: Ha*Ash, Ednita Nazario, Pedro Capó, Fabiola, and Chayanne. She wrote "De Todas" for Chayanne's new album "En Todo Estaré". In December 2016, García wrote a song title "Chegaste" for Jennifer Lopez and Roberto Carlos. The song was recorded in Portuguese and Spanish. It is set to be included in Lopez's upcoming second Spanish album. The song was released on her YouTube on December 15, 2016, and was released for digital download and on Spotify the next day. In 2018, she wrote "Esa Mujer" especially for a duet between Roberto Carlos and Alejandro Sanz. It was released for digital download on Spotify, iTunes and Amazon on July 20 and will be part of Roberto Carlos new album. His first release completely in Spanish.

== Personal life ==
García married her guitarist and boyfriend of seven years, Carlos Padial, on December 19, 2010. The wedding was a private ceremony held at the Parroquia Santa Clara in Carolina, Puerto Rico, followed by a reception at an estate in the same city. However, the couple divorced in September 2013.

On February 13, 2016, García publicly announced she is in a same sex relationship with her personal trainer, Jocelyn Troche. On December 25, 2019, Garcia announced that she and Jocelyn were married.

== Other ventures ==
=== Product and endorsements ===
Kany released her first line of girl's jeans in 2015. The jeans were distributed though Kress Kids, in Puerto Rico. The following year, in 2016, she launched a collection of jeans for women with Kress Stores, Kress Kids' parent company. In 2016, she also released her first perfume, Up by Kany García.

== Critical response ==
Other artists as well as music magazines and labels have spoken about Kany's singing.

A Voice that transmits emotions.

— Franco De Vita

There's this Puerto Rican artist which I had the opportunity to write, someone who I think is very talented named Kany. I think is she's very interesting. I think she has a lot in her head, and she wants to say lots of things and is someone who I think needs the confidence of the people that believe in her, and dare to release not the most popular songs people think but the songs that has the essence of Kany.

— Ricardo Arjona

Her husky tone seems built for a sideways glance at breakups, sex, aging and human indifference. What has set Garcia apart from other pop divas on the charts, other than writing her own songs and ability to play guitar, is her blend of commercial melodies with lyrics that are sometimes bracingly personal, even if the story isn't always about her.

— Billboard Magazine

== Awards and nominations ==
Year	Category	Genre	Recording	Result
Latin Grammy Awards
2008	Best Female Pop Vocal Album	Pop	Cualquier Día	Won
2008	Album of the Year	General	Cualquier Día	Nominated
2008	Best New Artist	General	Herself	Won
2008	Song of the Year	General	"Hoy Ya Me Voy"	Nominated
2010	Best Female Pop Vocal Album	Pop	Boleto De Entrada	Nominated
2012	Record of the Year	General	"Que Te Vaya Mal"	Nominated
2013	Best Singer-Songwriter Album	Singer-songwriter	Kany Garcia	Nominated
2013	Best Engineered Album	Production	Kany Garcia	Won
2018	Record of the Year	General	"Para Siempre"	Nominated
2018	Song of the Year	General	"Para Siempre"	Nominated
2018	Album of the Year	General	Soy Yo	Nominated
2018	Best Singer-Songwriter Album	Singer-songwriter	Soy Yo	Nominated
2019	Best Singer-Songwriter Album	Singer-songwriter	Contra el Viento	Won
2019	Song of the Year	General	"Quédate"	Nominated
2019	Best Short Form Music Video	Music Video	"Banana Papaya"	Won
2020	Best Singer-Songwriter Album	Singer-songwriter	Mesa Para Dos	Won
2020	Album of the Year	General	Mesa Para Dos	Nominated
2020	Record of the Year	General	"Lo Que En Ti Veo"	Nominated
2020	Song of the Year	General	"Lo Que En Ti Veo"	Nominated
2020	Best Tropical Song	Tropical	"Búscame"	Nominated
Grammy Awards
2011	Best Latin Pop Album	Latin	Boleto de Entrada	Nominated
2013	Best Latin Pop Album	Latin	Kany Garcia	Nominated
2021	Best Latin Pop or Urban Album	Latin	Mesa Para Dos	Nominated

== Discography ==
=== Studio albums ===
- 2007: Cualquier Día
- 2009: Boleto de Entrada
- 2012: Kany Garcia
- 2016: Limonada
- 2018: Soy Yo
- 2019: Contra el Viento
- 2020: Mesa Para Dos
- 2022: El Amor Que Merecemos
- 2024: García
- 2026: Puerta Abierta

=== Live albums ===
- 2014: En Vivo: Kany Garcia
- 2024: Kany Garcia En Vivo Desde PR

=== Songs written by Kany García for other artists ===
Year	Song	Artist	Co-writers and other collaborators
2013	La Más Fuerte	Ednita Nazario	
2014	"De Todas"	Chayanne	Elmer Figueroa
2016	"Chegaste"	Jennifer Lopez and Roberto Carlos	

== Tours ==
Kany García's Tours

- 2007: Kany García: Live In Puerto Rico
- 2010: Boleto De Entrada Tour
- 2013: Kany García: En Concierto
- 2016-2017: Limonada Tour
- 2018-2019: Soy Yo Tour
- 2019-actualidad Contra El Viento Tour

As Guest Performer

- 2007: Franco De Vita En Concierto: (Opening act)
- 2008: Todo Cambio Tour (Camila): (Opening act in Los Angeles, New York and Mexico shows)
- 2008: Adios Tour (Sin Bandera): (Opening Act)
- 2009: Franco De Vita En Puerto Rico: (Guest Performer)
- 2010: Alejandro Sanz Tour: (Opening Act)

=== Touring ===
Following the release of her first album, García began an international tour. She began visiting several locations in Mexico and the United States. García made stops in other Latin American countries, like Ecuador, Colombia, Venezuela, Chile and Peru. She was in Mexico for the month of May 2008 promoting, after shooting the music video for her fourth single, "Esta Soledad" in Argentina. Kany later embarked in a United States mini-tour on where she made stops in MTV Mi TRL, Univision morning news, and as the opening act to Mexican pop Duo, Camila at their concerts in New York City and Washington. In March 2008, Kany presented her first concert at the José Miguel Agrelot Coliseum in Puerto Rico to a sold-out crowd.
García has expressed that she is "lucky" to have four singles from the production being converted into videos, noting she is "blessed by the public's response". Starting 2009, Kany began the promotion of her second album with a small tour, visiting Mexico, Venezuela, Colombia, and many other Latin American countries. Then in June 2010, she took her tour to her home country of Puerto Rico, and performed for the second time in the Coliseo de Puerto Rico.

=== Charity work ===
García has sponsored campaigns for a non-profit organization named Casa Familiar Virgilio Dávila, which provides education and sports resources for children in public housing projects of Bayamón, Puerto Rico. Kany was involved in a charity marathon run in Puerto Rico called "Carrera por una Cura". The marathon in San Juan, Puerto Rico, on where celebrities such as Adamari López, Ivy Queen, Black:Guayaba, Garcia herself, and many others run for prevention of cancer. The marathon was dedicated to Adamari López, who suffered from breast cancer in 2007. On January 22, 2010, Kany took part of "Un Abrazo a Haiti", a charity event on where money was raised to help victims of the hurricane of Haiti. More than $3 million was raised making it one of the most successful charity events in Puerto Rico. Kany joined forces with over 50 other Spanish performers to recreate the Spanish version of "We are the World", "Somos El Mundo". The song was created to raise funds for the people of Haiti. The song included artist like Thalía, Gilberto Santa Rosa, Chayanne and many others.

It's really a very big joy to be part of this song. After 25 years, is the first time it's done in Spanish and for something as beautiful as the cause of Haiti."

— Kany García

== See also ==
- Objetivo Fama
- List of Puerto Ricans
- List of Puerto Rican songwriters
