= ¿Qué Nos Pasó? =

Song written by Puerto Rican artist Kany García

Single by Kany García

from the album Cualquier Día
- Released: October 2007 USA
- Recorded: 2006
- Genre: Latin pop
- Length: 3:24
- Label: Sony International
- Songwriter(s): Kany García

Kany García singles chronology
"Hoy Ya Me Voy" (2007)	"¿Qué Nos Pasó?" (2007)	"Bajo el mismo Cielo" (2008)

"¿Qué Nos Pasó?" ("What happened to us?") is a Latin pop song written by Puerto Rican artist Kany García from her debut album Cualquier Día. The song is the second single of her album Cualquier Día. It was released to radio in October 2007. It has since become a Top 30 Hit on Billboard Latin Pop Airplay.

== Song information ==
The song according to Kany, is a melancholy lament on a loveless world, the changes in the world, how people acted before and how they act now. Kany has stated in many interviews that ¿Qué Nos Pasó? is for those people who are part of the materialistic world society, who have forgotten to love the really important things in life.

== Music video ==
The music video was shot in a form of a live performance. Kany starts performing with her band in front of a couple of people. The video was shot in Mexico City and was directed by Alexis Gudino.

== Track listing ==
1. "¿Qué Nos Pasó?": 3:24 (album version)
2. "¿Qué Nos Pasó?": 2:58 (radio version)

== Chart performance ==
The song become a moderate success in Billboard Latin Pop Airplay charts peaking at #22.

== Charts ==
Singles - (worldwide)
Year	Chart	Position
2007	US Billboard Hot Latin Pop Airplay	22

== Awards and nominations ==
Year	Award	Category	Result
2008	Billboard Latin Music Awards	Latin Pop Airplay Song of the Year, New Artist	Nominated
