= List of Uruguayan Grammy Award winners and nominees =

The following is a list of Grammy Awards winners and nominees from Uruguay:

== Bajofondo ==
- Bajofondo
  - 2003 - winners: 4th Annual Latin Grammy Awards - Best Pop Instrumental Album: Bajofondo Tango Club
  - 2021 - nominee: 63rd Annual Grammy Awards - Best Latin Rock or Alternative Album: Aura

== Kalmar ==
- Carlos Kalmar:
  - 2013 - nominee: 55th Annual Grammy Awards - Best Orchestral Performance: Music for a Time of War
  - 2016 - nominee: 58th Annual Grammy Awards - Best Orchestral Performance: Spirit of the American Range
  - 2021 - nominee: 63rd Annual Grammy Awards - Best Orchestral Performance: Aspects of America: Pulitzer Edition
- Hugo Fattoruso
  - 2019 - received: 20th Annual Latin Grammy Awards - Lifetime Achievement Award

=== Drexler ===
- Jorge Drexler:
  - 2002 - nominee: 3rd Annual Latin Grammy Awards - Best Male Pop Vocal Album: Sea
  - 2005 - nominee: 6th Annual Latin Grammy Awards - Song of the Year: "Al Otro Lado del Río"
  - 2006 - nominee: 48th Annual Grammy Awards - Best Latin Pop Album: Eco
  - 2007 - nominee: 8th Annual Latin Grammy Awards - Best Singer-Songwriter Album: "12 Segundos de Oscuridad"
  - 2008 - nominee: 50th Annual Grammy Awards - Best Latin Pop Album: 12 segundos de oscuridad
  - 2009 - nominee: 51st Annual Grammy Awards - Best Latin Pop Album: Cara B
  - 2010 - nominee: 11th Annual Latin Grammy Awards - Record of the Year: Una Canción Me Trajo Hasta Aquí
  - 2010 - nominee: 11th Annual Latin Grammy Awards - Song of the Year: "Una Canción Me Trajo Hasta Aquí"
  - 2010 - nominee: 11th Annual Latin Grammy Awards - Best Long Form Music Video: La Trama Circular
  - 2010 - nominee: 11th Annual Latin Grammy Awards - Best Singer-Songwriter Album: Amar la Trama
  - 2011 - nominee: 12th Annual Latin Grammy Awards - Song of the Year: "Que El Soneto Nos Tome Por Sorpresa"
  - 2012 - nominee: 13th Annual Latin Grammy Awards - Best Alternative Song: "1987" (with Juan Campodónico)
  - 2013 - nominee: 14th Annual Latin Grammy Awards - Best Urban Song: "Sacar la Voz" (with Andrés Mujica Celis and Ana Tijoux)
  - 2014 - winner: 15th Annual Latin Grammy Awards - Record of the Year: Universos paralelos (ft. Ana Tijoux)
  - 2014 - winner: 15th Annual Latin Grammy Awards - Best Singer-Songwriter Album: Bailar en la Cueva
  - 2014 - nominee: 15th Annual Latin Grammy Awards - Album of the Year: Bailar en la Cueva
  - 2014 - nominee: 15th Annual Latin Grammy Awards - Song of the Year: "Universos Paralelos" (with Ana Tijoux)
  - 2015 - nominee: 57th Annual Grammy Awards - Best Latin Rock or Alternative Album: Bailar en la Cueva
  - 2015 - nominee: 16th Annual Latin Grammy Awards - Record of the Year: Ella Es
  - 2017 - nominee: 18th Annual Latin Grammy Awards - Record of the Year: El Surco
  - 2018 - nominee: 57th Annual Grammy Awards - Best Latin Rock or Alternative Album: Salvavidas de Hielo
  - 2018 - winner: 19th Annual Latin Grammy Awards - Record of the Year: Telefonía
  - 2018 - winner: 19th Annual Latin Grammy Awards - Song of the Year: "Telefonía"
  - 2018 - winner: 19th Annual Latin Grammy Awards - Best Singer-Songwriter Album: Salvavidas de Hielo
  - 2018 - nominee: 19th Annual Latin Grammy Awards - Album of the Year: Salvavidas de Hielo
  - 2020 - nominee: 21st Annual Latin Grammy Awards - Song of the Year: "Codo con Codo"
  - 2021 - winner: 22nd Annual Latin Grammy Awards - Best Alternative Song: "Nominao" (with Alizzz and C. Tangana)
  - 2021 - winner: 22nd Annual Latin Grammy Awards - Best Pop/Rock Song: "Hong Kong"
  - 2022 - winner: 23rd Annual Latin Grammy Awards - Record of the Year: Tocarte (with C. Tangana)
  - 2022 - winner: 23rd Annual Latin Grammy Awards - Best Singer-Songwriter Album: Tinta y Tiempo
  - 2022 - winner: 23rd Annual Latin Grammy Awards - Best Pop Song: "La Guerrilla de la Concordia"
    Note: Award shared with Sebastián Yatra for "Tacones Rojos"
  - 2022 - winner: 23rd Annual Latin Grammy Awards - Best Alternative Song: "El Día que Estrenaste el Mundo" (with Rafa Arcaute and Federico Vindver)
  - 2022 - winner: 23rd Annual Latin Grammy Awards - Song of the Year: "Tocarte" (with Pablo Drexler, Víctor Martínez, and C. Tangana)
  - 2022 - winner: 23rd Annual Latin Grammy Awards - Best Portuguese Language Song: "Vento Sardo" (with Marisa Monte)
  - 2022 - nominee: 23rd Annual Latin Grammy Awards - Best Short Form Music Video: "Tocarte" (ft. C. Tangana)
  - 2022 - nominee: 23rd Annual Latin Grammy Awards - Album of the Year: Tinta y Tiempo
  - 2023 - nominee: 65th Annual Grammy Awards - Best Latin Rock or Alternative Album: Tinta y Hielo
  - 2024 - winner: 25th Annual Latin Grammy Awards - Best Singer-Songwriter Song: "Derrumbe"
  - 2024 - winner: 25th Annual Latin Grammy Awards - Song of the Year: "Derrumbe"
  - 2025 - winner: 26th Annual Latin Grammy Awards - Best Pop/Rock Song: Desastres fabulosos
  - 2025 - nominee: 26th Annual Latin Grammy Awards - Record of the Year: Desastres fabulosos

=== Serebrier ===
- José Serebrier:
  - 1975 - nominee: 17th Annual Grammy Awards - Best Orchestral Performance: Ives: Symphony No. 4
  - 1975 - nominee: 17th Annual Grammy Awards - Best Engineered Album, Classical (as conductor): Ives: Symphony No. 4
  - 2002 - nominee: 44th Annual Grammy Awards - Best Orchestral Performance: Schumann: Violin Concerto in D minor; New England Triptych/Ives: Variations On "America"
  - 2002 - nominee: 44th Annual Grammy Awards - Best Instrumental Soloist(s) Performance (with orchestra): Schumann: Violin Concerto in D minor
  - 2003 - winner: 4th Annual Latin Grammy Awards - Best Classical Album (as composer and conductor): Carmen Symphony
  - 2004 - nominee: 46th Annual Grammy Awards - Best Contemporary Classical Composition: Symphony No. 3
  - 2004 - nominee: 46th Annual Grammy Awards - Best Orchestral Performance: Symphony No. 3; Passacaglia and Perpetuum Mobile, Etc.
  - 2004 - nominee: 46th Annual Grammy Awards - Best Classical Album: Rorem: Three Symphonies
  - 2004 - nominee: 46th Annual Grammy Awards - Best Engineered Album, Classical (as conductor): Rorem: Three Symphonies
  - 2004 - nominee: 5th Annual Latin Grammy Awards - Best Classical Album (as peformer): Glazunov Symphony No. 5 / The Seasons
  - 2004 - nominee: 5th Annual Latin Grammy Awards - Best Classical Album (as conductor): Rodrigo Concierto de Aranjuez/Villa Lobos: Concerto for Guitar / Ponce: Concierto del Sur
  - 2005 - nominee: 47th Annual Grammy Awards - Best Orchestral Performance: Glazunov: Symphony No. 5; The Seasons, Op. 67 (Complete Ballet)
  - 2005 - nominee: 47th Annual Grammy Awards - Best Engineered Album, Classical (as conductor): Glazunov: Symphony No. 5; The Seasons, Op. 67 (Complete Ballet)
  - 2006 - nominee: 48th Annual Grammy Awards - Best Orchestral Performance: Mussorgsky/Stokowski: Pictures at an Exhibition
  - 2006 - nominee: 48th Annual Grammy Awards - Best Immersive Audio Album: Mussorgsky/Stokowski: Pictures at an Exhibition
  - 2007 - nominee: 49th Annual Grammy Awards - Best Orchestral Performance: Glazunov: Symphonies 4 & 7
  - 2008 - nominee: 50th Annual Grammy Awards - Best Orchestral Performance: Shostakovich: The Golden Age
  - 2009 - nominee: 51st Annual Grammy Awards - Best Orchestral Performance: Glazunov: Symphony No. 6, La Mer, Introduction and Dance from Salome
  - 2011 - nominee: 12th Annual Latin Grammy Awards - Best Classical Album (as peformer): José Serebrier: Sinfonia No. 1
  - 2012 - nominee: 54th Annual Grammy Awards - Best Engineered Album, Classical (as conductor): Glazunov: Complete Concertos
  - 2012 - nominee: 13th Annual Latin Grammy Awards - Best Classical Album (as conductor): Dvořák Symphony No. 7; In Nature's Realm, Scherzo Capriccioso
  - 2013 - nominee: 14th Annual Latin Grammy Awards - Best Classical Album (as performer): Adagio
  - 2013 - nominee: 14th Annual Latin Grammy Awards - Best Classical Album (as performer): Dvořák Symphonies 3 & 6
  - 2014 - nominee: 15th Annual Latin Grammy Awards - Best Classical Album (as peformer): Dvorák: Symphony No. 2 – 3 Slavonic Dances
  - 2015 - nominee: 16th Annual Latin Grammy Awards - Best Classical Album (as peformer): Dvorak-Serebrier Legends: Symphony No. 8
  - 2015 - nominee: 16th Annual Latin Grammy Awards - Best Classical Contemporary Composition (as conductor): Orlando Jacinto García: "Auschwitz (Nunca Se Olvidarán)"
  - 2016 - nominee: 17th Annual Latin Grammy Awards - Best Classical Album (as conductor): José Serebrier Conducts Samuel Adler
  - 2018 - nominee: 19th Annual Latin Grammy Awards - Best Classical Album (as conductor): José Serebrier Conducts Granados
  - 2020 - nominee: 21st Annual Latin Grammy Awards - Best Classical Contemporary Composition (as composer): Variaciones Sinfónicas sobre Bach para Piano y Orquesta
  - 2021 - nominee: 63rd Annual Grammy Awards - Best Classical Compendium (as conductor): Serebrier: Symphonic Bach Variations; Laments and Hallelujahs; Flute Concerto
- Ruben Rada:
  - 2011 - received: 12th Annual Latin Grammy Awards - Lifetime Achievement Award
