= List of awards and nominations received by Jorge Drexler =

Jorge Drexler awards and nominations
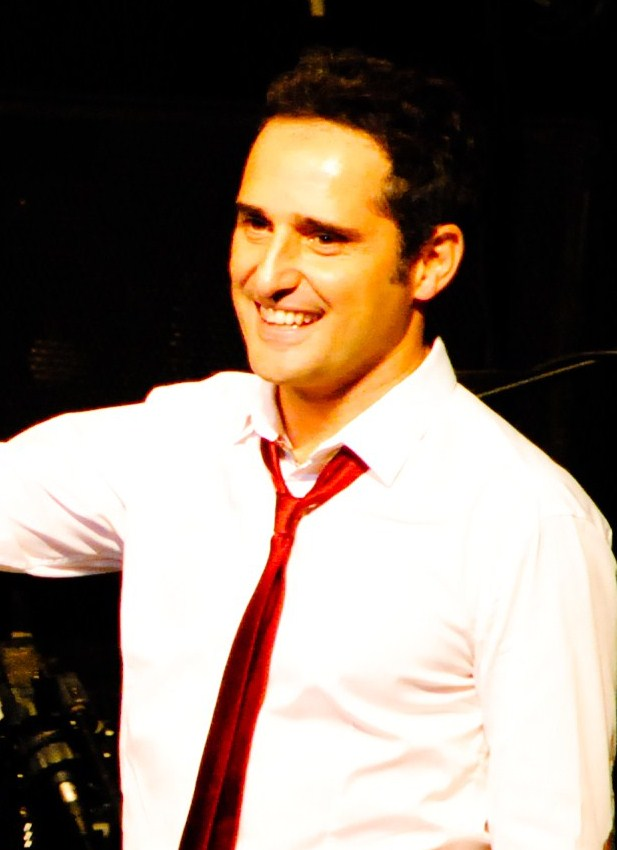
- Drexler performing in Santiago, Chile on September 25, 2010.
Awards and nominations
Award	Wins	Nominations
Academy Awards	1	1
ASCAP Latin Awards	5	5
Gardel Awards	0	2
Goya Awards	1	2
Grammy Awards	0	6
Latin Grammy Awards	16	35
Málaga Film Festival	1	1
MTV Video Music Awards Latinoamérica	0	1
Premio de la Música	2	4
Graffiti Award	1	8
Premio Sur	0	1
Shock Awards	0	1
World Soundtrack Awards	0	1

Totals (Note: Certain award groups do not simply award one winner. They acknowledge several different recipients, have runners-up, and have third place. Since this is a specific recognition and is different from losing an award, runner-up mentions are considered wins in this award tally. For simplification and to avoid errors, each award in this list has been presumed to have had a prior nomination.)
- Wins: 24
- Nominations: 50

Jorge Drexler is a Uruguayan singer-songwriter who has received awards and nominations for his contributions to the music industry. Drexler released his first album in 1992, La Luz Que Sabe Robar, and following an invitation from Spanish singer-songwriter Joaquín Sabina, he relocated from Uruguay to Spain, where he signed an international recording contract. In 2005, he received Uruguay's first Academy Award, taking Best Original Song for "Al Otro Lado del Río", written for the film The Motorcycle Diaries; the track also received Latin Grammy and World Soundtrack Awards nominations. Drexler has been nominated four times at the Grammy Awards, for the albums Eco (2004), 12 Segundos de Oscuridad (2006), Cara B (2008), Bailar en la Cueva (2014), and Salvavidas de Hielo (2018); for Bailar en la Tierra, he won the award for Best Singer-Songwriter Album at the 15th Latin Grammy Awards. At the same ceremony, the singer earned a Latin Grammy for Record of the Year for his song "Universos Paralelos", performed with Chilean artist Ana Tijoux. In 2022, Drexler won six Latin Grammy Awards, including his first for Song of the Year for "Tocarte", his collaboration with C. Tangana.

For his work writing Spanish-language versions of singles by Colombian singer-songwriter Shakira, he has received five ASCAP Latin Awards. Drexler received his only Goya Award in 2010 with the song "Que El Soneto Nos Tome Por Sorpresa", written for the Spanish film Lope; the same year he was named Commander of the Order of Isabella the Catholic for his musical contributions. For his acting debut in the film La Suerte en Tus Manos (2012), Drexler was nominated for a Premio Sur in Argentina for Breakthrough Male Performance. Overall, Drexler has received 13 awards from 53 nominations.

== Academy Awards ==
The Academy Awards are awarded annually by the Academy of Motion Picture Arts and Sciences in the United States. Drexler has received one award.

Year	Nominee / work	Award	Result
2005	"Al Otro Lado del Río"	Best Original Song	Won

== ASCAP Latin Awards ==
The ASCAP Latin Awards are awarded annually by the American Society of Composers, Authors and Publishers in the United States. Drexler has received five awards.

Year	Nominee / work	Award	Result
2010	"Loba"	Pop/Ballad	Won
2011	"Did It Again (Lo Hecho Está Hecho)"	Pop/Ballad	Won
2011	"Gitana"	Pop/Ballad	Won
2011	"Waka Waka (This Time for Africa)"	Pop/Ballad	Won
2011	"Waka Waka (This Time for Africa)"	Television	Won

== Gardel Awards ==
The Gardel Awards are awarded annually by the Chamber of Phonograms and Videograms Producers in Argentina. Drexler has received two nominations.

Year	Nominee / work	Award	Result
2000	Frontera	Best Male Pop Album	Nominated
2001	Sea	Best Male Pop Album	Nominated

== Goya Awards ==
The Goya Awards are awarded annually by the Academia de las Artes y las Ciencias Cinematográficas in Spain. Drexler has received one award from two nominations.

Year	Nominee / work	Award	Result
2008	"La Vida Secreta de las Pequeñas Cosas"	Best Original Song	Nominated
2010	"Que El Soneto Nos Tome Por Sorpresa"	Best Original Song	Won

== Grammy Awards ==
The Grammy Awards are awarded annually by the National Academy of Recording Arts and Sciences in the United States. Drexler has received six nominations.

Year	Nominee / work	Award	Result
2006	Eco	Best Latin Pop Album	Nominated
2008	12 Segundos de Oscuridad	Best Latin Pop Album	Nominated
2009	Cara B	Best Latin Pop Album	Nominated
2015	Bailar en la Cueva	Best Latin Rock, Urban or Alternative Album	Nominated
2018	Salvavidas de Hielo	Best Latin Rock, Urban or Alternative Album	Nominated
2023	Tinta y Tiempo	Best Latin Rock, Urban or Alternative Album	Nominated

== Latin Grammy Awards ==
The Latin Grammy Awards are awarded annually by the Latin Academy of Recording Arts & Sciences in the United States. As of 2022, Drexler has received 16 awards from 35 nominations.

Year	Nominee / work	Award	Result
2002	Sea	Best Male Pop Vocal Album	Nominated
2005	"Al Otro Lado del Río"	Song of the Year	Nominated
2007	12 Segundos de Oscuridad	Best Singer-Songwriter Album	Nominated
2010	Amar la Trama	Best Singer-Songwriter Album	Nominated
2010	La Trama Circular	Best Long Form Music Video	Nominated
2010	"Una Canción Me Trajo Hasta Aquí"	Record of the Year	Nominated
2010	"Una Canción Me Trajo Hasta Aquí"	Song of the Year	Nominated
2011	"Que El Soneto Nos Tome Por Sorpresa"	Song of the Year	Nominated
2012	"1987"	Best Alternative Song	Nominated
2013	"Sacar la Voz" (with Anita Tijoux)	Best Urban Song	Nominated
2014	Bailar en la Cueva	Album of the Year	Nominated
2014	Bailar en la Cueva	Best Singer-Songwriter Album	Won
2014	"Universos Paralelos" (with Anita Tijoux)	Song of the Year	Nominated
2014	"Universos Paralelos" (with Anita Tijoux)	Record of the Year	Won
2015	"Ella Es"	Record of the Year	Nominated
2017	"El Surco"	Record of the Year	Nominated
2018	"Telefonía"	Record of the Year	Won
2018	"Telefonía"	Song of the Year	Won
2018	Salvavidas de Hielo	Album of the Year	Nominated
2018	Salvavidas de Hielo	Best Singer-Songwriter Album	Won
2020	"Codo con Codo"	Song of the Year	Nominated
2021	"Nominao" (with C. Tangana)	Best Alternative Song	Won
2021	"Hong Kong" (as songwriter)	Best Pop/Rock Song	Won
2022	Tinta y Tiempo	Album of the Year	Nominated
2022	Tinta y Tiempo	Best Singer-Songwriter Album	Won
2022	"Tocarte" (with C. Tangana)	Record of the Year	Won
2022	"Tocarte" (with C. Tangana)	Song of the Year	Won
2022	"Tocarte" (with C. Tangana)	Best Short Form Music Video	Nominated
2022	"La Guerra de la Concordia"	Best Pop Song	Won
2022	"El Día Que Estrenaste el Mundo"	Best Alternative Song	Won
2022	"Vento Sardo" (with Marisa Monte)	Best Portuguese Language Song	Won
2024	"Derrumbe"	Song of the Year	Won
2024	"Derrumbe"	Best Singer-Songwriter Song	Won
2025	"Desastres Fabulosos" (with Conociendo Rusia)	Record of the Year	Nominated
2025	"Desastres Fabulosos" (with Conociendo Rusia)	Best Pop/Rock Song	Won

== Lo Nuestro Award ==
The Lo Nuestro Award is an honor presented annually by American television network Univision. Drexler received one nomination.

Year	Nominee / work	Award	Result
2020	"Blue (Diminuto Planeta Azul)"	Video of the Year	Nominated

== Málaga Film Festival ==
The Málaga Film Festival is a film festival held annually in Málaga, Spain. Drexler received one award.

Year	Nominee / work	Award	Result
2009	Un Instante Preciso	Biznaga de Plata	Won

== MTV Video Music Awards Latinoamerica ==
The MTV Video Music Awards Latinoamerica were awarded annually by the MTV Networks Latin America in the United States. Drexler received one nomination.

Year	Nominee / work	Award	Result
2002	Himself	Best New Artist — South	Nominated

== Premio de la Música ==
The Premio de la Música was awarded annually by the Sociedad General de Autores y Editores in Spain. Drexler received two awards from four nominations.

Year	Nominee / work	Award	Result
2005	Eco	Album of the Year	Nominated
2007	12 Segundos de Oscuridad	Album of the Year	Won
2009	Cara B	Pop Album of the Year	Won
2011	La Trama Circular	Best Musical Audiovisual Production	Nominated

== Graffiti Award ==
The Graffiti Award (Premio Graffiti) is awarded annually by media members specialized in music and entertainment in Uruguay. Drexler has received one award from eight nominations.

Year	Nominee / work	Award	Result
2005	Eco	Best Album	Nominated
2005	Eco	Best Songwriter	Nominated
2005	Eco	Best Solo Artist	Won
2005	www.jorgedrexler.com	Best Website	Nominated
2007	12 Segundos de Oscuridad	Best Solo Artist	Nominated
2007	"Transoceanica"	Best Music Video	Nominated
2009	Cara B	Best Live Album	Nominated
2009	Cara B	Best Popular Music Album and Urban Song	Nominated

== Premio Sur ==
The Premio Sur is awarded annually by the Academy of Cinematography Arts and Sciences Awards in Argentina. Drexler has received one nomination for his performance in the film La Suerte En Tus Manos.

Year	Nominee / work	Award	Result
2012	Himself	Breakthrough Male Performance	Nominated

== Shock Awards ==
The Shock Awards are awarded annually by the Colombian magazine Shock. Drexler has received one nomination.

Year	Nominee / work	Award	Result
2015	Bailar en la Cueva	Latin American Album of the Year	Nominated

== World Soundtrack Awards ==
The World Soundtrack Awards are awarded annually by the FIAPF during the Flanders International Film Festival Ghent in Belgium. Drexler has received one nomination.

Year	Nominee / work	Award	Result
2005	"Al Otro Lado del Río"	Best Original Song Written Directly for a Film	Nominated
