= Dinho Ouro Preto =

Brazilian musician

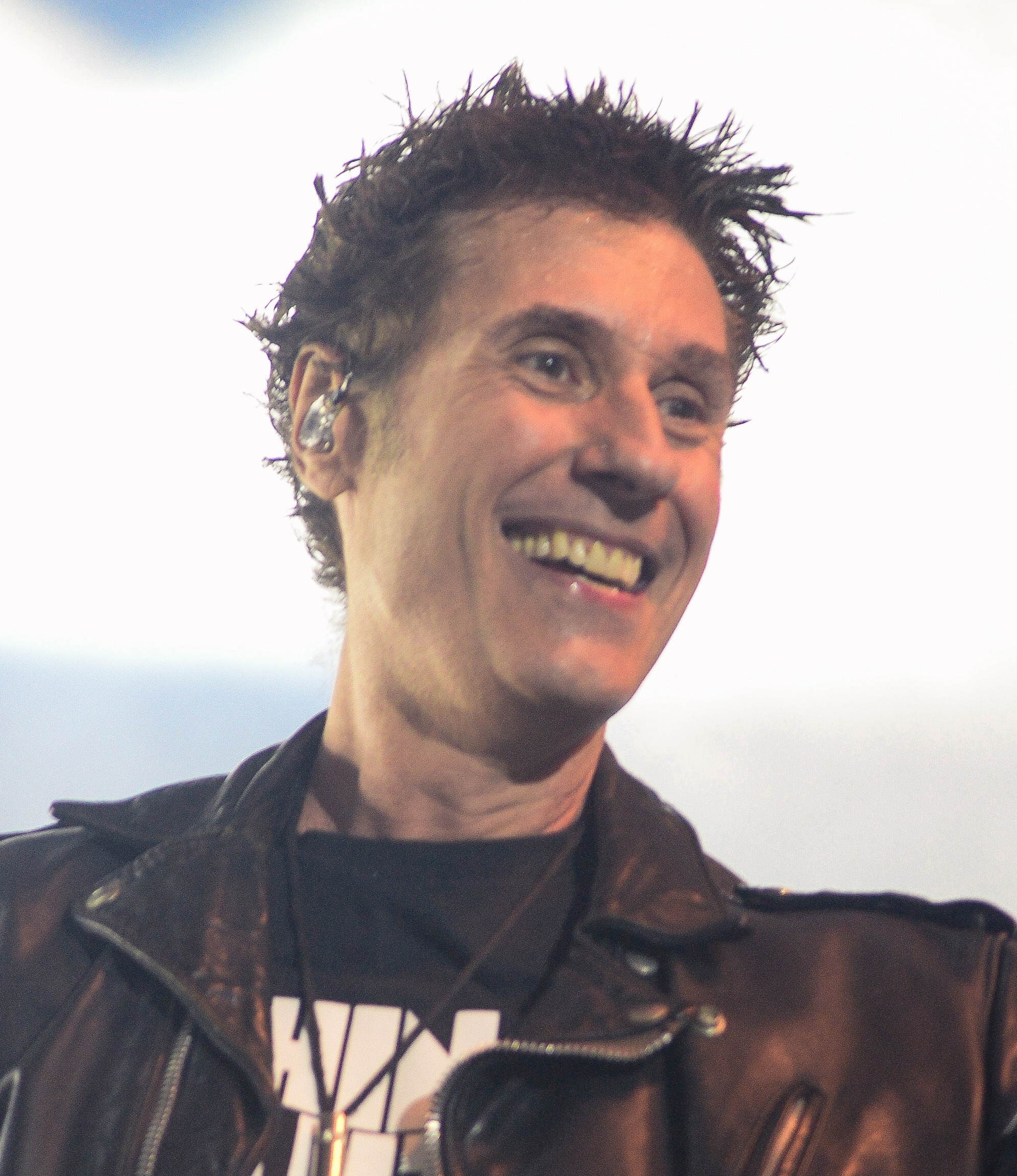
- Dinho Ouro Preto in 2018
- Born: April 27, 1964 (age 62); Curitiba, Paraná, Brazil
- Occupations: Singer, songwriter
- Years active: 1982–present
- Known for: Capital Inicial
- Style: Alternative rock, rock, punk rock, post-punk
- Website: www.dinhoouropreto.com.br

Fernando de Ouro Preto (April 27, 1964), better known as Dinho Ouro Preto, is a Brazilian singer and songwriter. He is the lead singer of the band Capital Inicial, brother of musician Ico Ouro Preto, and half-brother of fellow musician Dado Villa-Lobos.

== Biography ==
=== Early years and education ===
Fernando de Ouro Preto is the great-great-grandson of the Viscount of Ouro Preto, who was the 32nd and last Primer Minister of the Brazilian Empire. He is also the great-grandson of the Count of Afonso Celso, one of the founders and a member of the Academia Brasileira de Letras (ABL).

Son of an ambassador and a historian, Fernando was born in Curitiba, Paraná state capital, on April 27, 1964. He was the third child, after Ico and Ana. His father's career led the family to move to the United States, Austria and Switzerland, before settling in Brasília. During these travels, in 1974, the son of another diplomat, Dado Villa-Lobos, who would later become his stepbrother. At the age of 11, he was introduced to rock music through Herbert Vianna and Bi Ribeiro, who later formed the band Os Paralamas do Sucesso.

He left Brazil and returned at the age of 16, when punk culture was beginning to emerge in the streets of Brasilia. He started attending meetings of the group known as Turma da Colina, located at a strategic spot from where the city could be viewed. His father, Afonso, married Lucy, Dado's mother, and they both moved to work in Guinea-Bissau, while his mother, Marília, relocated to France. Dado's father also left the country, so Dinho, Dado, Dado's brother Luiz Otávio "Tavo" Villa-Lobos, and Bi Ribeiro's brother Pedro Ribeiro began living together in the same apartment in Brasília. Dinho became friends with Renato Russo, lead singer of the band Aborto Elétrico. He frequently attended the band's rehearsals and concerts, becoming familiar with their music and forming personal connections with the members.

=== Career ===
When Aborto Elétrico split up in 1982, the Lemos brothers, along with guitarist Loro Jones, wanted to create a new group. Dinho attended an audition at Fê's house, and after a performance of the song "Psicopata", he was selected as the lead singer of Capital Inicial at the age of 19. Three months later, they performed their debut concert, at the University of Brasilia (UnB), on the same day that Dinho took his university entrance exam. The following month, they played a concerts at the traditional Circo Voador concert hall in Rio de Janeiro and another at Sesc Pompeia in São Paulo. Later, the group decided to move from Brasília to São Paulo, where they currently reside. Dinho's parents were abroad and unaware of his artistic career. They only learned he had become a musician when he and his band achieved success.

Capital Inicial released their self-titled eponymous debut album in 1986, featuring songs written over the previous career. The band subsequently achieved significant success, but faced challenges with a lifestyle involving excessive sex, drugs, and parties, resulting in hastily composed albums. In 1993, after a performance at Circo Voador, Dinho announced his departure from Capital Inicial.

Dinho paused his career working, spending nights at concerts and engaging in heavy alcohol and drugs use. During one of these events at his apartment, an individual stole approximately 20,000 dollars, leaving him financially strained. During his hiatus, Dinho pursued music studies, learning to play instruments and attempting to establish himself as trying to become an independent artist. He released two solo albums, Vertigo, in 1994, and Dinho Ouro Preto, in 1995, which did not achieve commercial success. During this period of his solo career, he worked in translation and advertising.

In 1998, Dinho and his former bandmates reunited to organize a series of concerts to commemorate the 15th anniversary of the birth of Capital Inicial. Following the success of the tour, they were offered a contract for a new album, and in November 1998, they released Atrás dos Olhos. The album's success led to a performance in the Acústico MTV series, with the resulting album in 2000 selling over one million copies sold and making the return of Capital Inicial.

In 2012, he released his third solo album, Black Heart, featuring covers of songs by rock bands such as The Smiths, Joy Division and Pet Shop Boys. In 2020, he released his fourth solo album, Roque em Rôu, containing 12 covers of by Brazilian rock bands and artists. Some of the re-recordings on the album are "Rolam as Pedras", by Kiko Zambianchi, "Metamorfose Ambulante", by Raul Seixas, "A Mais Pedida", by Raimundos, and "Saideira", by Skank.

As the leader of Capital Inicial, Dinho, was nominated three times for the Latin Grammy Award for Best Portuguese Language Rock or Alternative Album in 2003, 2007, and 2010.

== Personal life ==
Dinho's first marriage was to model and fashion producer Mary Stockler, who, according to the singer, "fell apart because of drug abuse. So I cheated and she found out. And I also found out about her [betrayals]". He later dated producer Flávia Lafer. Dinho is the cousin of actress Maria Ribeiro. He has stated that he is an atheist. He resides in the Jardins neighborhood, a noble area of São Paulo. He is a São Paulo FC fan.

In 1994, Dinho met architect Maria Cattaneo at an MTV Brasil event. After spending time together, she returned to Genoa, where she was planning to marry. They maintained contact, and six months later, Cattaneo ended her engagement and relocated to Brazil. Dinho and Maria married in 1995, and the couple they have three children: Giulia (b. 1997), Isabel (b. 1999) and Affonso (b. 2003).

In 2013, gained attention on Twitter after a typographical error. In expressing the idea that "we need a band that unites all tribes, like Nirvana (referring to the American band)", Dinho typed 'Norvana'. The expression went viral and reached the Trendigs Topics.

=== Political views ===
During the impeachment process of Dilma Rousseff's impeachment, Dinho the impeachment process of both Rousseff her vice-president, Michel Temer. At Rock in Rio 2017, he dedicated the song 'Que País é Este?', a protest song about revolt by the band Legião Urbana, to then-president Temer.

During Operation Car Wash, Dinho publicly supported the anti-corruption he showed support for the operation and for judge Sergio Moro. He later suggested that the operation was perceived by some as targeting the Workers' Party (PT). In the 2018 presidential election, he voted for Fernando Haddad of the PT. In the 2022 presidential election, he again supported the PT, voting for Luiz Inácio Lula da Silva.

=== Health ===
Dinho Ouro Preto has experienced several accidents and illnesses throughout his life, which have attracted attention on social media. In 2020, he was among the most discussed topics on Twitter, with some users referring to him as the "Brazilian Highlander," alluding to the immortal warrior from the 80s movie.

On September 10, 2009, he was diagnosed with H1N1 influenza (swine flu), leading to the cancellation of two concerts in Natal and Sorocaba. On October 31, 2009, Dinho experienced an accident during a concert in Patos de Minas, interior of Minas Gerais. He fell from a catwalk approximately three meters high, sustaining a mild head injury and fracturing three ribs and six Vertebrae. He was taken to a local hospital in Pato de Minas, from where he was transferred to the Albert Einstein Israelite Hospital in São Paulo. On November 1, he was admitted to the intensive care unit (ICU) of the Sírio-Libanês Hospital in São Paulo, where he remained for 20 days. He was unable to perform for six months but eventually recovered.

On March 16, 2016, the singer was diagnosed with dengue fever and was admitted to the Hospital Sírio-Libanês in São Paulo. As a result, concerts scheduled in São Carlos and Alfenas with Capital Inicial that week were postponed. He was discharged on March 19, after three days in the hospital.

On March 25, 2020, Dinho announced that he had been diagnosed with COVID-19, in the pandemic context. In an Instagram post, he described his symptoms, comparing them to his experience with dengue fever in 2016: "what I'm feeling reminds me of the dengue fever I had a few years ago," the singer said.

== Discography ==
=== Solo career ===
- (1994) Vertigo
- (1995) Dinho Ouro Preto
- (2012) Black Heart
- (2020) Roque em Rôu

=== With Capital Inicial ===
- (1986) Capital Inicial
- (1987) Independência
- (1988) Você Não Precisa Entender
- (1989) Todos os Lados
- (1991) Eletricidade
- (1998) Atrás dos Olhos
- (2002) Rosas e Vinho Tinto
- (2004) Gigante!
- (2005) MTV Especial: Capital Inicial – Aborto Elétrico
- (2007) Eu Nunca Disse Adeus
- (2010) Das Kapital
- (2012) Saturno
- (2014) Viva a Revolução
- (2018) Sonora

=== Live albums ===
- (2000) Acústico MTV: Capital Inicial
- (2008) Multishow ao Vivo: Capital Inicial
- (2012) Rock in Rio 2011 – Capital Inicial
- (2015) Acústico NYC
- (2022) Capital Inicial 4.0

=== DVDs ===
- (2000)Acústico MTV: Capital Inicial
- (2005) MTV Especial: Capital Inicial – Aborto Elétrico
- (2008) Multishow ao Vivo: Capital Inicial
- (2012) Rock in Rio 2011 – Capital Inicial
- (2015) Acústico NYC
- (2022) Capital Inicial 4.0
