= 11th Annual Latin Grammy Awards =

Music awards presented Nov 2010

11th Latin Grammy Awards
- Date: November 11, 2010
- Venue: Mandalay Bay Events Center, Paradise, Nevada
- Hosted by: Lucero and Eugenio Derbez

Highlights
- Person of the Year: Plácido Domingo

Television/radio coverage
- Network: Univision

The 11th Annual Latin Grammy Awards were held on Thursday, November 11, 2010, at the Mandalay Bay Events Center in Las Vegas, Nevada. It was the third time the annual event had taken place at this location. The eligibility period for recordings to be nominated was July 1, 2009 to June 30, 2010. Nominations were announced on September 8, 2010. On September 14, 2010, it was announced that the Latin Recording Academy Person of the Year honoree would be Plácido Domingo. The big winners of the night were Camila, Juan Luis Guerra and Gustavo Cerati with three awards.

Juan Luis Guerra's A Son de Guerra was awarded the Album of the Year, the second time he has received this award. "Mientes" by pop band Camila won the Record of the Year and Song of the Year. Alex Cuba and Nelly Furtado became the first Canadian musicians to receive a Latin Grammy Award. Cuba received a Latin Grammy Award for Best New Artist and Furtado the Best Female Pop Vocal Album.

== Awards ==
Winners are in bold text.

=== General ===
Record of the Year

Camila — "Mientes"

- Maria Bethânia — "Tua"
- Concha Buika — "Se Me Hizo Fácil"
- Jorge Drexler — "Una Canción Me Trajo Hasta Aquí"
- Alejandro Sanz — "Desde Cuándo"

Album of the Year

Juan Luis Guerra 440 — A Son de Guerra

- Bebe — Y.
- Miguel Bosé — Cardio
- Camila — Dejarte de Amar
- Alejandro Sanz — Paraíso Express

Song of the Year

Mario Domm and Mónica Vélez — "Mientes" (Camila)

- Descemer Bueno and Enrique Iglesias — "Cuando Me Enamoro" (Enrique Iglesias featuring Juan Luis Guerra)
- Alejandro Sanz and Tomas Torres — "Desde Cuándo" (Alejandro Sanz)
- Rubén Blades — "Las Calles"
- Jorge Drexler — "Una Canción Me Trajo Hasta Aquí" (Jorge Drexler)

Best New Artist

Alex Cuba

- Estrella
- Koko
- Jotdog
- Maria Gadú

=== Pop ===
Best Female Pop Vocal Album

Nelly Furtado — Mi Plan

- Bebe — Y.
- Estrella — Black Flamenco
- Kany García — Boleto De Entrada
- Rosario — Cuéntame

Best Male Pop Vocal Album

Alejandro Sanz — Paraíso Express

- Marc Anthony — Iconos
- Alex Cuba — Alex Cuba
- Joaquín Sabina — Vinagre y Rosas
- Aleks Syntek — Métodos de Placer Instantáneo

Best Pop Album by a Duo/Group with Vocals

Camila — Dejarte de Amar

- Estopa — X-Anniversarium
- Jotdog — Jotdog
- Los Claxons — Los Claxons
- Taxi — Aquí y Ahora

=== Urban ===
Best Urban Music Album

Chino & Nacho — Mi Niña Bonita

- Cartel de Santa — Sincopa
- Daddy Yankee — Daddy Yankee Mundial
- La Mala Rodríguez — Dirty Bailarina
- Vico C — Babilla

Best Urban Song

La Mala Rodríguez — "No Pidas Perdón"

- Daddy Yankee — "Descontrol"
- MC Babo, Mauricio Garza and R. Rodríguez — "El Hornazo" (Cartel de Santa)
- Daddy Yankee — "Grito Mundial"
- Everton Bonner, Don Omar, Sly Dunbar, Eliel and Lloyd Willis — "Hasta Abajo" (Don Omar)
- Vico C — "Sentimiento" (Vico C featuring Arcángel)

=== Rock ===
Best Rock Album

Gustavo Cerati — Fuerza natural

- Bohemia Suburbana — Bohemia Suburbana
- Andrés Calamaro — On the Rock
- Chetes — Hipnosis
- Viniloversus — Si No Nos Mata

Best Rock Song

Gustavo Cerati — "Deja Vu"

- Chetes — "Arena"
- Sebastián Franco, Jesús Herrera, Amauri Sepúlveda, Diego Suárez and Marcos Zavala — "Cárcel" (Bengala)
- Bruno Albano Naughton, Luis G. Balcarce, Guido Colzani, Daniel Melero, Tomas Putruele, Diego "Uma" Rodriguez, Tuta Torres and Patricio Troncos — "Lo Comandas" (Banda de Turistas)
- Andrés Calamaro — "Los Divinos"

=== Alternative ===
Best Alternative Music Album

- **Ely Guerra — Hombre Invisible**
- Banda de Turistas — Magical Radiophonic Heart
- Bengala — Oro
- El Cuarteto de Nos — Bipolar
- Perrozompopo — CPC (Canciones Populares Contestatarias)

Best Alternative Song

ChocQuibTown — "De Donde Vengo Yo"

- Hello Seahorse! — "Criminal"
- Ceci Bastida — "Cuando Vuelvas a Caer"
- Roberto Musso — "El Hijo de Hernandez" (El Cuarteto de Nos)
- Gustavo Cortes, Ricardo Cortes and Nicolas Gonzalez — "Resistencia Indigena" (Sig Ragga)

=== Tropical ===
Best Salsa Album

Gilberto Santa Rosa — Irrepetible

- Huey Dunbar — Huey Dunbar IV
- Orquesta Guayacán — Bueno y Más
- La India — Unica
- Mario Ortiz All Star Band — Tributo 45 Aniversario

Best Cumbia/Vallenato Album

Diomedes Diaz and Alvaro Lopez — Listo Pa' la foto

- El Binomio de Oro de America — Vuelve y pica...El Pollo
- Omar Geles and Alex Manga — Prueba Superada
- Jorge Oñate — Te Dedico Mis Triunfos
- Poncho Zuleta and Cocha Molina — El Nobel del Amor

Best Contemporary Tropical Album

Juan Luis Guerra 440 — A Son de Guerra

- Lucrecia — Album de Cuba
- Prince Royce — Prince Royce
- Tecupae — Tiempo
- Johnny Ventura — Volvio La Navidad

Best Traditional Tropical Album

Concha Buika — El Último Trago

- Pedro Jesus — Tributo a Orlando Contreras "El Jefe del Despecho"
- Septeto Habanero — 90 Años, Orgullos de Los Soneros
- Sierra Maestra — Sonando Ya
- Various Artists — 100 Sones Cubanos Producer Edesio Alejandro

Best Tropical Song

Juan Luis Guerra — "Bachata en Fukuoka"

- Fonseca and Willie Colón — "Estar Lejos" (Fonseca)
- Jorge L. Chacin and Fernando Osorio — "Sueño Contigo" (Tecupae featuring Cabas )
- Huey Dunbar and Jorge Luis Piloto — "Te Amaré" (Huey Dunbar)
  - Tito El Bambino — "Te Pido Perdón"

=== Singer-Songwriter ===
Best Singer-Songwriter Album

Rubén Blades — Cantares del Subdesarrollo

- Santiago Cruz — Cruce de Caminos
- Jorge Drexler — Amar la Trama
- Maria Gadú — Maria Gadú
- Pavel Núñez — El Tiempo del Viento
- Silvio Rodríguez — Segunda Cita

=== Regional Mexican ===
Best Ranchero Album

Vicente Fernández — Necesito de Tí

- Alejandro Fernández — Dos Mundos
- Pedro Fernández — Amarte a la Antigua
- Juan Gabriel — Juan Gabriel
- Jenni Rivera — La Gran Señora

Best Banda Album

Banda el Recodo — Me Gusta Todo de Tí

- La Original Banda El Limón de Salvador Lizarraga — Soy Tu Maestro
- Banda Los Recoditos — ¡Ando Bien Pedo!
- El Chapo de Sinaloa — Con La Fuerza del Corrido
- K-Paz de la Sierra — Con Banda

Best Tejano Album

Elida Reyna & Avante — Fantasia

- Little Joe & La Familia — A Night Of Classics In El Chuco
- Joe Posada — Point Of View
- Ruben Ramos & The Mexican Revolution — Revolutionized
- Sunny Sauceda y Todo Eso — Homenaje a Mi Padre

Best Norteño Album

Grupo Pesado — Desde La Cantina Vol. 1.

- Duelo — Solamente Tú
- Intocable — Classic
- Los Tigres del Norte — La Granja
- Los Tucanes de Tijuana — Retro-Corridos

Best Regional Mexican Song

Yoel Henriquez and Paco Lugo — "Amarte a La Antigua" (Pedro Fernández)

- Freddie Martinez — "Atrapada En Un Amor" (Elida Reyna y Avante)
- Pepe Aguilar — "Chaparrita" (Songwriter: Pepe Aguilar)
- Joan Sebastian — "Estuve" (Alejandro Fernández)
- Josué Contreras and Johnny Lee Rosas — "No Puedo Volver" (Intocable)

=== Instrumental ===
Best Instrumental Album

Arturo Sandoval — A Time for Love

- Yamandu Costa and Hamilton de Holanda — Luz da Aurora
- Arthur Maia — O Tempo e a Musica
- Paulo Moura and Armandinho — Afrobossanova
- Soto 75 — Latin American Chillout

=== Traditional ===
Best Folk Album

Ilan Chester — Tesoros de la Música Venezolana

- Checo Acosta — El Folclor de Mi Tierra
- Eva Ayllón — Canta a Chabuca Granda
- Petrona Martínez — Las Penas Alegres
- Juan Fernando Velasco — Con Toda el Alma

Best Tango Album

Aida Cuevas — De Corazón a Corazón Mariachi Tango

- Pablo Aslan — Tango Grill
- Dyango — Puñaladas en el Alma
- Leopoldo Federico y Hugo Rivas — Sentido Único
- Narcotango — Limanueva
- Vayo — Tango Universal

Best Flamenco Album

Tomatito — Sonata Suite

- Juan Carmona — El Sentido del Aire
- José Mercé — Ruido
- Enrique Morente — Morente Flamenco en Directo
- Niño Josele — Española

=== Jazz ===
Best Latin Jazz Album

João Donato Trio — Sambolero

- Issac Delgado — L-O-V-E
- Mark Levine and The Latin Tinge — Off and On: The Music of Moacir Santos
- Poncho Sanchez — Psychedelic Blues
- Chucho Valdés — Cuban Dreams
- Miguel Zenón — Esta Plena

=== Christian ===
Best Christian Album (Spanish Language)

Monica — Tienes Que Creer

- Alex Campos — Te Puedo Sentir
- Danilo Montero — Devoción
- Rojo — Apasionado Por Tí
- Jesus Adrian Romero — El Brillo de Mis Ojos
- Álvaro Torres — Muy Personal

Best Christian Album (Portuguese Language)

- **Marina de Oliveira — Na Extremidade**
- Paulo César Baruk — Multiforme
- Bruna Krla — Advogado Fiel
- Kleber Lucas — Meu Alvo
- Soraya Moraes — Grande É O Meu Deus
- Rosa de Saron — Horizonte Distante
- Pe. Zezinho, Scj — Ao País dos Meus Sonhos

=== Brazilian ===
Best Brazilian Contemporary Pop Album

Sérgio Mendes — Bom Tempo

- CéU — Vagarosa
- Sandra de Sá — AfricaNatividade - Cheiro de Brasil
- Claudia Leitte — As Máscaras
- Michael Sullivan — Ao Vivo: Na Linha do Tempo Vol. 1

Best Brazilian Rock Album

Charlie Brown Jr. — Camisa 10 Joga Bola Até na Chuva

- Capital Inicial — Das Kapital
- Andreas Kisser — Hubris I & II
- Nasi — Vivo na Cena
- NX Zero — Sete Chaves

Best Samba/Pagode Album

Diogo Nogueira — Tô Fazendo a Minha Parte

- Alcione — Acesa
- Martinho da Vila — Poeta da Cidade: Martinho Canta Noel
- Grupo Revelação — Ao Vivo no Morro
- Monobloco — Monobloco 10
- Zeca Pagodinho — MTV Especial Zeca Pagodinho Uma Prova de Amor ao Vivo

Best MPB Album

Gilberto Gil — Banda Dois

- João Bosco — Não Vou Pro Céu, Mas Já Não Vivo no Chão
- Dori Caymmi — Inner World
- Toninho Horta — Harmonia & Vozes
- Joyce — Slow Music
- Jorge Vercillo — D.N.A.

Best Sertaneja Music Album

Zezé Di Camargo & Luciano — Double Face

- João Bosco and Vinicius — Coração Apaixonou - Ao Vivo
- Chitãozinho & Xororó — Se For Pra Ser Feliz
- Leonardo — Esse Alguém Sou Eu
- César Menotti & Fabiano — Retrato: Ao Vivo no Estúdio
- Luan Santana — Ao Vivo
- Victor & Leo — Ao Vivo e em Cores em São Paulo

Best Native Brazilian Roots Album

Gilberto Gil — Fé na Festa

- Frank Aguiar — Danquele Jeito
- Banda Calypso — 10 Anos CD 2
- Gaúcho da Fronteira — Gaúcho Doble Chapa
- Eva — Lugar da Alegria

Best Brazilian Song

Adriana Calcanhotto — "Tua" (Maria Bethânia)

- Jorge Vercillo — "Há de Ser"
- Sérgio Santos — "Litoral e Interior"
- Dori Caymmi and Paulo César Pinheiro — "Quebra-Mar" (Dori Caymmi)
- Edu Lobo and Paulo César Pinheiro — "Tantas Marés" (Edu Lobo)

=== Children's ===
Best Latin Children's Album

Luis Pescetti — Luis Pescetti

- Banda de Boca — MPB Pras Crianças
- Rita Rosa — Insectos y Bicharracos
- Various Artists — Brasileirinhos
- Various Artists — Lo Mejor De Playhouse Disney

=== Classical ===
Best Classical Album

Leo Brouwer — Integral Cuartetos De Cuerda
Fernando Otero — Vital

- Yalil Guerra — Old Havana. Chamber Music Vol. I
- Miguel del Águila — Salón Buenos Aires
- John Neschling and Orquestra Sinfônica do Estado de São Paulo — Tchaikovsky - Manfred
- Southwest Chamber Music and Tambuco Percussion Ensemble — William Kraft: Encounters

Best Classical Contemporary Composition

Lalo Schifrin — "Pampas" (Antonio Lysy)

- Miguel del Águila — "Clocks" (Miguel del Águila)
- Sergio Assad — "Interchange-For Guitar Quartet and Orchestra" (Los Angeles Guitar Quartet, David Amado and The Delaware Symphony Orchestra)
- Sergio Assad — "Maracaípe" (Beijing Guitar Duo)
- Orlando Jacinto Garcia — "Silencios Imaginados" (Nodus Ensemble)
- Tania Leon — "To and Fro (4 Moods)" (Nodus Ensemble)

=== Recording Package ===
Best Recording Package

Rock Instrument Bureau — Fuerza natural (Gustavo Cerati)

- Luis Itanare — Casa 4 (Famasloop)
- Boa Mistura — En El Fin del Mundo (Chambao)
- Pico Covarrubias — Hombre Invisible (Ely Guerra)
- Locktite — Work In Progress (Erizonte)

=== Production ===
Best Engineered Album

Paul Acedo, Rafa Arcaute, Sebastian Krys, Lee Levin, Daniel Ovie, Sebastian Perkal, Tom Russo, Esteban Varela, Dan, Warner and Lurssen Inc. — Distinto (Diego Torres)

- Gregg Field, Don Murray and Michael Bishop — A Time for Love (Arturo Sandoval)
- José Amosa, Fran Ibáñez, Antonio Ruiz and Eduardo Ruiz — Ruido (José Mercé)
- Moogie Canazio, Gabriel Pinheiro and Luiz Tornaghi — Tua (Maria Bethânia)
- Jose Luis Crespo, Raul Quilez and Ian Cooper — Y. (Bebe)

Producer of the Year

Jorge Calandrelli and Gregg Field
Sergio George

- Rafael Arcaute and Diego Torres
- Noel Pastor
- Julio Reyes Copello

=== Music video ===
Best Short Form Music Video

Julieta Venegas — "Bien o Mal"

- Ádammo — "Algún Día"
- El Cuarteto de Nos — "El Hijo de Hernandez"
- Juan Luis Guerra 440 — "Bachata en Fukuoka"
- Joaquín Sabina — "Viudita de Clicquot"

Best Long Form Music Video

Voz Veis — Una Noche Común y Sin Corriente

- Jorge Drexler — La Trama Circular
- León Gieco — Mundo Alas
- Laura Pausini — Laura Live World Tour 09
- Thalía — Primera Fila

=== Special awards ===
Lifetime Achievement Awards

- João Donato
- Armando Manzanero
- Las Hermanas Márquez
- Joseíto Mateo
- Jorge Oñate
- Susana Rinaldi
- Ryfns

Trustees Awards

- Manuel Bonilla
- Juan Carlos Calderón
- Hebe Camargo

== Performers ==
- Intro — "Latin Grammy 2010" 02:00
- Juan Luis Guerra featuring Chris Botti — "La Guagua / Lola's Mambo" 04:19
- Pedro Fernández — "Amarte A La Antigua / Celosa" 03:44
- Enrique Iglesias featuring Wisin & Yandel — "No Me Digas Que No / I Like It" 05:19
- Prince Royce and Ben E. King — "Stand By Me" 03:14
- Jenni Rivera — "Por Que No Le Calas / Ya Lo Sé" 03:29
- Marc Anthony featuring José Luis Perales — "Y Cómo Es El / Tú Amor Me Hace Bien" 08:14
- Banda El Recodo — "Dime Que Me Quieres" 03:06
- Nelly Furtado featuring La Mala Rodríguez — "Fuerte / Bajo Otra Luz (Rebirth Demolition Mix)" 03:42
- Camila — "Bésame" 04:12
- Rosario — "Cuéntame" 03:54
- Alejandro Fernández — "Vamos A Darnos Tiempo / Júrame" 05:16
- Ricky Martin and Natalia Jiménez — "Lo Mejor De Mi Vida Eres Tú" 03:34
- Grupo Pesado — "Cielo Azul, Cielo Nublado"
- Aleks Syntek — "Loca"
- Aida Cuevas — "Volver"
- ChocQuibTown — "Somos Pacíficos"
- Chino & Nacho — "Niña Bonita / Lo Que No Sabes Tú"
- Gilberto Santa Rosa and Johnny Ventura — "Hay Que Dejarse De Vaina" 04:56

== Presenters ==
- Ximena Navarrete and Pepe Aguilar — presented Best Pop Vocal Album, Male
- Itatí Cantoral and Tommy Torres — presented Best Urban Music Album
- Jaime Camil and Claudia Leitte — presented Best Pop Vocal Album, Duo or Group
- Alejandro Sanz — presented Best New Artist
- Ricky Martin — presented People of the Year
- Vico C and Kany García — presented Record of the Year
- Gabriela Spanic and Jorge Drexler — presented Best Contemporary Tropical Album
- Cristián de la Fuente and Charo — presented Best Regional Mexican Song
- Maria Gadú, Tito El Bambino and Angélica Vale — presented Song of the Year
- Kuno Becker, Alexa Vega and Camilla Belle — presented Best Pop Vocal Album, Female
- La Mala Rodríguez and Alex Cuba — presented Best Ranchero Album
- Juan Fernando Velasco, Santigo Cruz and Lourdes Stephen — presented Best Tropical Song
- Paloma San Basilio — presented Album of the Year
