= The Motorcycle Diaries =

Motorcycle Diaries or The Motorcycle Diaries may refer to:

- The Motorcycle Diaries (book), a 1952 memoir by Che Guevara, first published in 1995
  - The Motorcycle Diaries (film), a 2004 film based on Guevara's memoir
    - The Motorcycle Diaries (soundtrack), the soundtrack from the above movie
- Motorcycle Diaries (film), an Indian film, unrelated to Guevara
- Motorcycle Diaries (TV program), a documentary show produced by GMA Network from 2011 to 2017

== See also ==
- Corbyn the Musical: The Motorcycle Diaries, a 2016 musical written by journalists Rupert Myers and Bobby Friedman
- "The Motorcycle Diary", an episode of James May's Toy Stories
