= Acústico MTV: Capital Inicial =

Live album by Capital Inicial
- Released: May 26, 2000
- Recorded: March 21, 2000
- Venue: Mars Theater, São Paulo, SP, Brazil
- Genre: Rock, Pop rock, Acoustic
- Length: 55 min
- Language: Portuguese
- Label: Abril Music
- Director: Rodrigo Carelli
- Producer: Marcelo Sussekind

Capital Inicial chronology
'Atrás dos Olhos' (1998)	Acústico MTV: Capital Inicial (2000)	'Rosas e Vinho Tinto' (2002)

Acústico MTV: Capital Inicial is the second live album and the first video album by Brazilian rock band Capital Inicial, released on May 26, 2000, on CD, VHS and DVD, initially distributed by Abril Music and later by BMG Brasil. The album is part of the Acústico MTV series organized by MTV Brasil.

== Background ==
Recorded on March 21, 2000, at the Mars Theater in the Bela Vista neighborhood of São Paulo, the album was intended to give a new look to the band Capital Inicial, founded in the 1980s in the Brazilian capital, Brasília.

The album features two new songs, "Tudo que Vai" and "Natasha", as well as a re-recording of "Primeiros Erros (Chove)", composed by musician Kiko Zambianchi, who is also one of the guest musicians featured throughout the album and who accompanied the band on their tour to promote the album. This was also the last album to feature guitarist Loro Jones. The album also featured the participation of singer Zélia Duncan, a school friend of Dinho's, in the recording of the track "Eu Vou Estar".

=== Release ===
The album was released on March 26, 2002, on MTV Brazil. The album was a huge success and charted six songs, "Tudo Que Vai", "Primeiros Erros (Chove)", "Natasha", "Cai a Noite", "Independência" and "Fogo"; consecrating the band's resurgence, which began with the album Atrás dos Olhos, released in 1998.

The album was released on CD, DVD and VHS, all by Abril Music, the music subsidiary of the Abril group.

== Tracks ==
No.	Title	Writer(s)	Length
1.	"O Passageiro (The Passenger)"	Iggy Pop, Ricky (version by Bozzo Barretti and Dinho Ouro Preto)	4:38
2.	"O Mundo"	Pit Passarell	4:13
3.	"Todas as Noites"	Alvin, Bozo, Dinho Ouro Preto	4:31
4.	"Tudo Que Vai"	Alvin, Dado Villa-Lobos, Toni Platão	3:56
5.	"Independência"	Bozzo, Dinho, Fê Lemos, Flávio Lemos, Loro Jones	3:55
6.	"Leve Desespero"	Dinho, Fê, Flávio, Loro	3:50
7.	"Eu Vou Estar" (ft. Zélia Duncan)	Alvin, Dinho	3:33
8.	"Primeiros Erros (Chove)" (ft. Kiko Zambianchi)	Kiko Zambianchi	4:03
9.	"Cai a Noite"	Loro, Mark	3:14
10.	"Natasha"	Alvin, Dinho	3:13
11.	"Fogo"	Bozzo, Dinho	4:56
12.	"Fátima"	Flávio, Renato Russo	3:47
13.	"Veraneio Vascaína"	Flávio, Renato Russo	2:47
14.	"Música Urbana"	Fê, Flávio, André Pretorius, Renato	4:12
Total length:			55:02

== Musicians ==
=== Capital Inicial ===
- Dinho Ouro Preto – vocals
- Loro Jones – guitar, backing vocals
- Fê Lemos – bass guitar
- Flávio Lemos – drums

=== Guest musicians ===
- Aislan Gomes – Rhodes piano, Hammond organ, guitar, backing vocals
- Denny Conceição – percussion
- Kiko Zambianchi: guitar, backing vocals
- Marcelo Sussekind – acoustic guitar, slide guitar, eBow
- Zélia Duncan – vocal (7)

== Critical reception ==
Alexandre Nagado, from the entertainment portal Omelete, gave the album a positive review and wrote that: “Coming out of Brasilia in the early 1980s and still being a reference in Brazilian rock today, Capital Inicial takes a breather and prepares for the new millennium with what they do best: vigorous urban music.” Jamari França, for the Rio de Janeiro newspaper Jornal do Brasil, also gave the album a positive review, calling it a 'light and unlocked revision' and praised the sound production "the sound of the record is perfect thanks to Marcelo Sussekind, the best producer in Brazil when it comes to making records within the classic parameters of pop-rock.

On the other hand, Paulo Vieira, from the Folha de S. Paulo newspaper, criticized the album negatively: “Capital Inicial is as dated as Jovem Guarda [...] they put us all in there, make us sing the choruses happily, to the embarrassment of our children and nephews."

== Sales and certifications ==
=== Albums ===
Format	Certifying Body	Certification	Ref.
CD	(Brazil) ABPD	3× Platinum	
DVD	(Brazil) ABPD	Gold× Brazil	

=== Single ===
Year	Single	Certifications
2000	"Tudo Que Vai"	
2000	"Primeiros Erros (Chove)"	
2000	"Natasha"	* (Brazil) ABPD: Platinum
2001	"Cai a Noite"	
2001	"Independência"	
2001	"Fogo"	

== Legacy ==
Journalist Tatiana Tavares wrote for the Rio newspaper Tribuna da Imprensa in December 2000 that "Capital had its year of glory. With their 'Acústico MTV', Dinho Ouro Preto's band gained a new lease of life and played more shows in 2000 than ever before in their career". The album is considered a turning point in the band's career, giving the artists a new lease of life on the commercial circuit.

In Discoteca Básica's List of the 500 Greatest Brazilian Music Records, according to the more than 162 experts who took part in writing the book, they ranked Capital Inicial's Acústico MTV as number 347 in the poll. Apart from it, only one other record by the band was mentioned in the vote, the debut album Capital Inicial.

At the end of 2024, the band announced a tour for the following year to celebrate the 25th anniversary of the album's release. The show features members who took part in the original recording, such as Denny Conceição, Aislan Gomes, Kiko Zambianchi and production by Marcelo Sussekind.
