= Aquí y Ahora =

Aquí y Ahora may refer to:

- Aquí y Ahora (Erik Rubin album), 2009
- Aquí y Ahora (Taxi album), 2010
- Aquí y Ahora (TV series)
