= Music of Gibraltar =

Gibraltar is a British overseas territory with many musical influences. Rock based music is undergoing a renaissance with a multitude of local bands playing original material and covers. Local venues have begun accepting Gibraltarian bands and those from nearby Spain, resulting in a varied mix of live performances every weekend as well as some weekday nights.

Musicians from Gibraltar include Charles Ramirez, the first guitarist invited to play with the Royal College of Music Orchestra, and successful rock bands like Breed 77, Melon Diesel and Taxi.

The best known Gibraltarian musician is Albert Hammond, who has had top 10 hits in the UK & US, and has written many songs for international artists such as Whitney Houston, Tina Turner and Julio Iglesias among many others.

Concerts in Gibraltar by well known international acts have recently given local acts a showcase for original material in their supporting roles. These include Surianne supporting Suzanne Vega, Sarah Howard supporting Steve Hogarth, Jetstream supporting Ali Campbell and Jessie J and SuperWookie supporting Marillion at the annual Gibraltar Music Festival.

== Gibraltarian bands ==
- Breed 77 – Internationally recognised Flamenco-Metal band
- Taxi – Pop rock band formed by three of Melon Diesel's former members
- Adrian Pisarello & the EC band – Acoustic Rumba-Rock with Flamenco and Jazz influences
- Jetstream – Rock / Pop, Opened for UB40s Ali Campbell and Jesse J for the inaugural Gibraltar Music Festival in 2012. EP "Piece of the Puzzle" showcased and released at the 2014 Gibraltar Music Festival headlined by The Script
