= Black Flamenco =

Studio album by Estrella
- Released: October 27, 2009
- Genres: Flamenco, R&B
- Label: Warner Music Latina

Estrella chronology
Estrella (2006)	Black Flamenco (2009)

Black Flamenco is the second studio album released by Spanish singer Estrella. The album was nominated for a Latin Grammy Award for Best Female Pop Vocal Album at the 11th Annual Latin Grammy Awards.

== Track listing ==
1. Si me sientes
2. Aquí seguiré
3. Hoy quiero decirte
4. Persuasión
5. Tierra
6. Designios
7. Dime
8. Todo cambiará
9. Mírame
10. Cante al amor
