= Taxi (Gibraltar band) =

Gibraltarian pop rock band

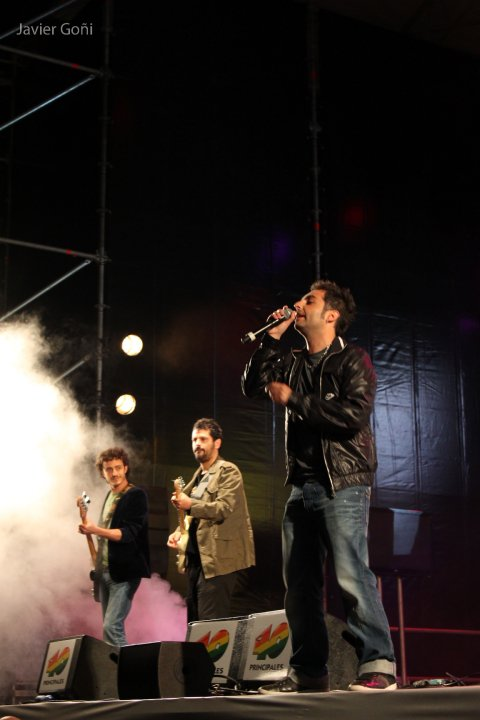
- Taxi performing at Primavera Pop 2010 in Barcelona

Background information
- Origin: Gibraltar
- Genres: Rock; pop rock; latin pop; pop punk
- Years active: 2005–present
- Label: Sony Music
- Spinoff of: Melon Diesel
- Members: Dylan Ferro, Daniel Fa, Daniel Bugeja
- Website: El Taxímetro

Taxi is a Gibraltarian pop rock band founded in 2005 after the break-up of Melon Diesel. After the quintet's break-up, its members dissolved into two different bands: Taxi (Dylan Ferro, Dani Fa and Danny Bugeja) and Area 52 (Guy Palmer and Adrian Pozo). Whilst the latter moved on to play alternative rock in English, Taxi kept loyal to Melon Diesel's Hispanic fanbase, composing songs in Spanish. Their songs maintain a certain similarity to those of Melon Diesel although slightly more upbeat with more pop influences.

In September 2010, Taxi was nominated for a Latin Grammy Award in the Best Pop Album category by a duo or group with vocals by "Aquí y Ahora".

== Origins ==
Although the band never gave an official press release when Melon Diesel broke up in 2003, the reason given was that there was a difference in opinions concerning what language the song lyrics should be written in and the direction in which the band was moving in. Ferro, Fa and Bugeja performed as No Eye Dear. After some time, the trio went on to develop their main project, which would become Taxi.

== Members ==
- Dylan Ferro – lead vocals (2005–present)
- Daniel Fa – guitar (2005–present)
- Daniel Bugeja – guitar (2005–present)

== Discography ==
- Libre (2005)
- Mil Historias (2006)
- Mirando Atrás (2008)
- Aquí y Ahora (2010)
- Tras el horizonte (2013)

== See also ==
- Melon Diesel
- Music of Gibraltar
