= Hombre Invisible =

Studio album by Ely Guerra
- Released: November 27, 2009
- Genre: Rock
- Length: 43:51
- Label: Honey Company
- Producer: Ely Guerra

Ely Guerra chronology
| Sweet & Sour, Hot y Spicy (2004) | Hombre Invisible (2009) |

Hombre Invisible is the fifth studio album recorded by Mexican singer-songwriter Ely Guerra, released by her own label Homey Company. The album won a Latin Grammy Award for Best Alternative Music Album in 2010.

== Track listing ==
| No. | Title | Writer(s) | Length |
|---|---|---|---|
| 1. | "Lontano" | Ely Guerra, Enrique Bunbury | 3:52 |
| 2. | "Messy" | Ely Guerra, Alvaro Henríquez | 2:40 |
| 3. | "Stranger" | Ely Guerra, Hernan Hecht, Ezequiel Jaime, Nicolás Santella, Demian Gálvez | 3:18 |
| 4. | "Colmena" | Ely Guerra | 4:54 |
| 5. | "Mi Condición" | Ely Guerra, Gustavo Santaolalla | 4:34 |
| 6. | "Bumeran" | Ely Guerra, Pablo Gigliotti | 4:24 |
| 7. | "Lento Funeral" | Ely Guerra, Horacio Franco | 3:56 |
| 8. | "You Love Me" | Ely Guerra, Emmanuel del Real | 3:00 |
| 9. | "Antes de Septiembre" | Ely Guerra, Juanes | 4:42 |
| 10. | "La Habitación" | Ely Guerra, Gilberto Cerezo | 8:31 |
| 11. | "Vale que Tengas (Only on iTunes)" | Ely Guerra | 2:50 |
