= The Motorcycle Diaries (soundtrack) =

Soundtrack album by Gustavo Santaolalla
- Released: September 14, 2004
- Genre: Soundtrack
- Label: Deutsche Grammophon
- Producer: Gustavo Santaolalla

Singles from The Motorcycle Diaries (soundtrack)
- 1. "Al otro lado del río" Released: 2004

The Motorcycle Diaries is the original soundtrack of the 2004 film of the same name starring Gael García Bernal. The score was composed by Gustavo Santaolalla. The album won the BAFTA Award for Best Film Music. On February 26, 2010, Norwegian electronica duo Röyksopp released a free-downloadable remix of "De Ushuaia a la Quiaca" on their official website.

== Track listing ==
1. Apertura
2. Lagos Frías
3. Chichina
4. Chipi Chipi (Written by Gabriel Rodríguez) - María Ester Zamora, "Polito" González, Jorge Lobos, Cuti Aste, Roberto Lindl
5. Montaña
6. Sendero
7. Procesión
8. Jardín
9. La Partida
10. La Muerte de la Poderosa
11. Lima
12. La Salida de Lima
13. Zambita
14. "Que Rico el Mambo" - Written and Performed by Dámaso Pérez Prado
15. Círculo en el Río
16. Amazonas
17. Cabalgando
18. Leyendo en el Hospital
19. El Cruce
20. Partida del Leprosario
21. De Ushuaia a La Quiaca
22. Revolución Caliente
23. "Al otro lado del río" - Written and Performed by Jorge Drexler - won the Academy Award for Best Original Song.
