= Ely Guerra =

Mexican singer-songwriter (born 1972)

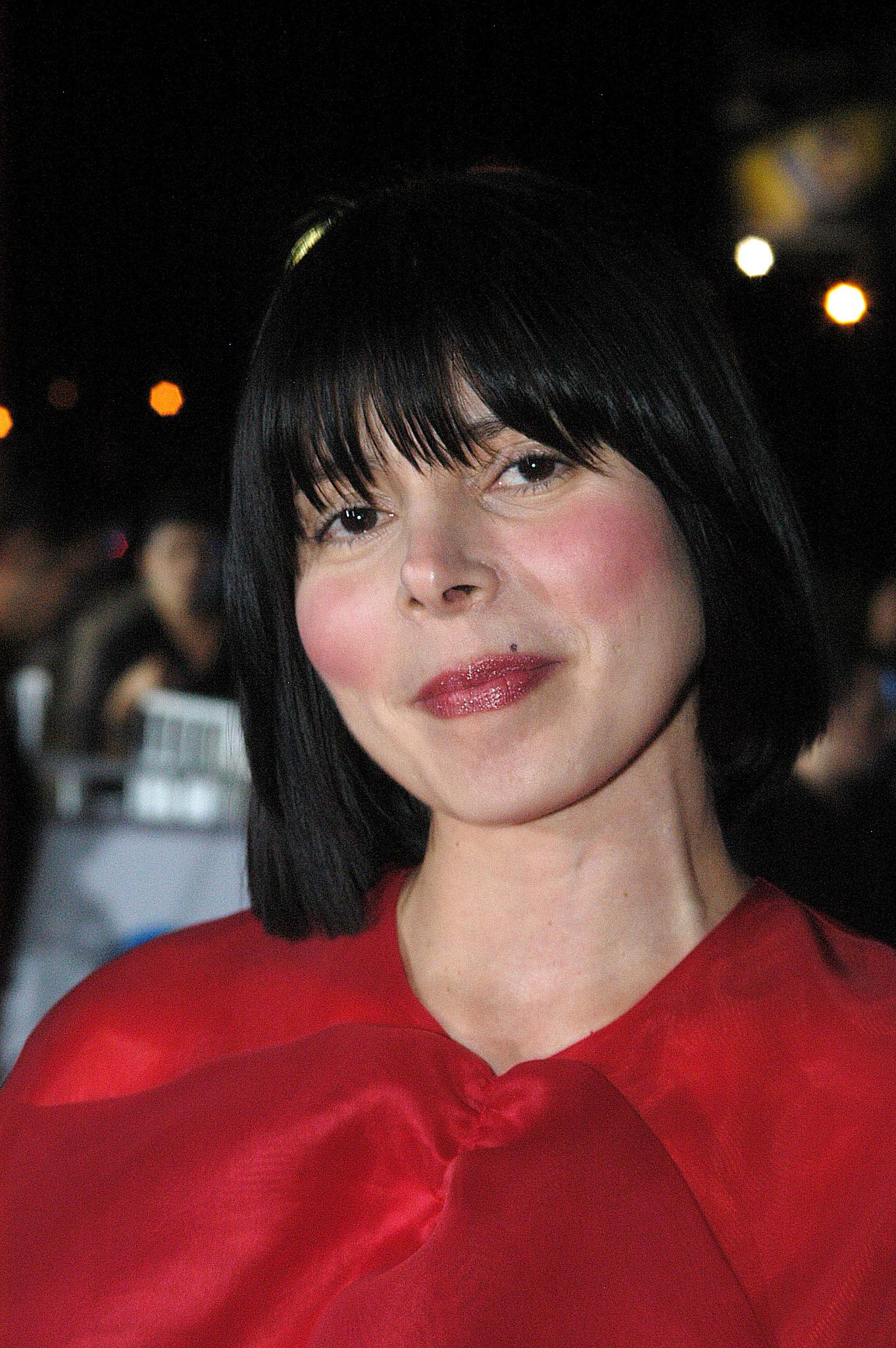
- Guerra in March 2008

Background information
- Born: Elizabeth Guerra Vázquez; February 13, 1972 (age 54)
- Origin: Monterrey, Nuevo León, Mexico
- Genres: Alternative rock, pop rock, Mexican rock, jazz
- Labels: EMI, BMG, Homey Company
- Website: ElyGuerra.com

Ely Guerra (born Elizabeth Guerra Vázquez, February 13, 1972) is a Mexican singer-songwriter who was raised in Monterrey, Nuevo León, Mexico. The daughter of Alberto Guerra and Gloria Vázquez, Guerra lived the first years of her life in Monterrey, where she was born, before moving to San Luis Potosí and then to Guadalajara, due to her father's work. It was in Guadalajara that she first discovered her passion for music. She has a mezzo-soprano voice.

== Life and career ==
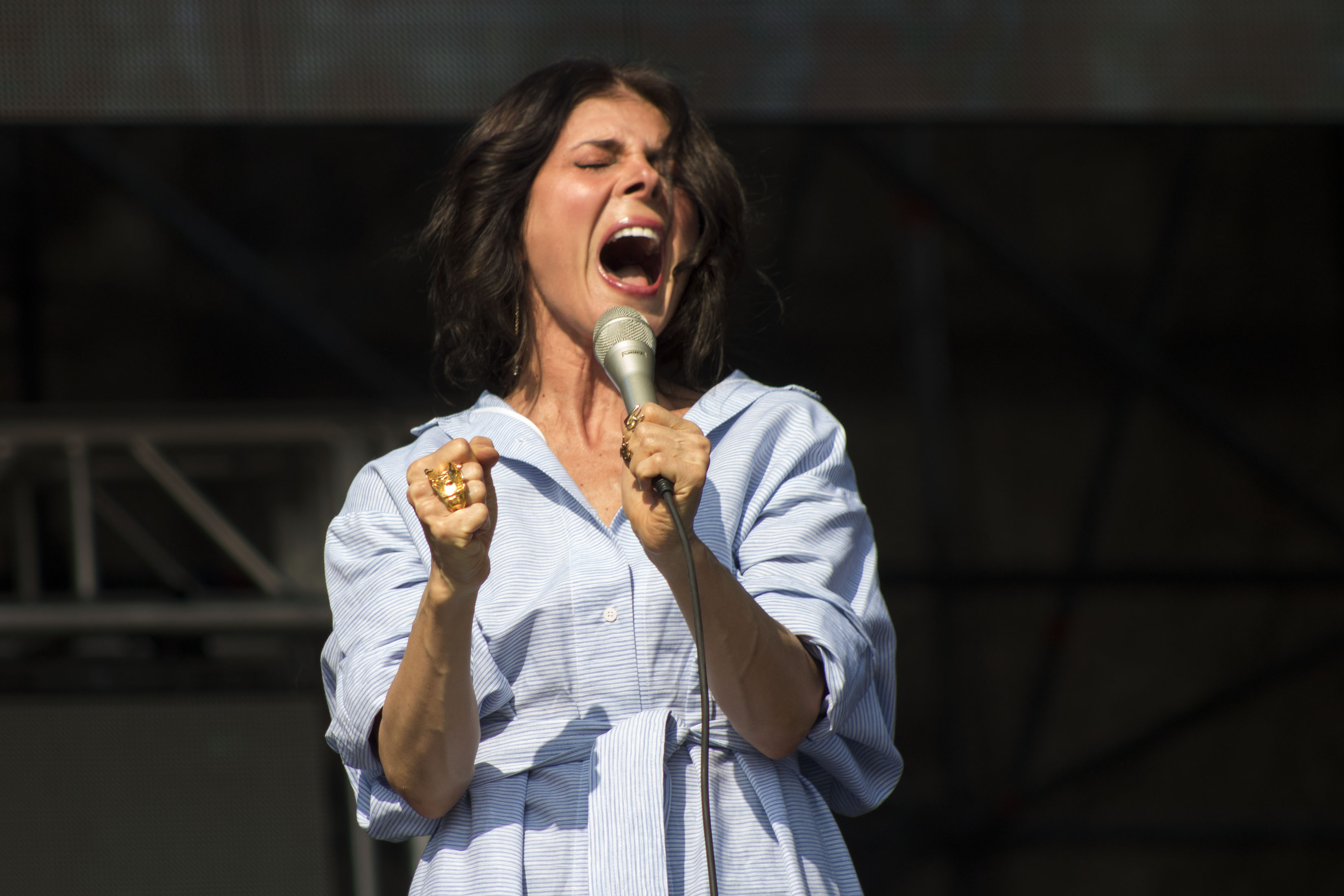
Ely Guerra in Mexico City, 2017.

Guerra wrote her first song at age ten. She attended school at the Evergreen State College in Washington.

In 1986, Guerra was the backing vocalist of the band Carmín. At the age of fifteen, she decided to follow her dreams and look for opportunities in Mexico City. At age 20, she signed her first contract with BMG. Recorded in Spain and produced by Teo Cardalda, her debut album Ely Guerra was released in 1992. However, the album failed to achieve the expected success. After finishing her contract with BMG, Guerra signed with another record label, EMI. In 1996, Guerra moved to London to work on her next record with Scottish producer Sandy McLelland. Her second album, Pa' Morirse de Amor, was released in 1997. "Ángel de Fuego" and "Peligro" were released as singles to promote the album.

In August 1998, Guerra and Julieta Venegas appeared on the cover of Time's Latin American edition and were named "The Most Promising Performers in the Mexican Rock Scene". Recorded in New York and produced by Andres Levin, her third album, Lotofire, was released in 1999. The album spawned three singles, "Tengo frío", "Yo no" and "Vete". Twenty years later Milenio would state of Lotofire's legacy that it is "the finest album that had been produced in Mexico so far." In 2001, Guerra contributed a cover of "La Tumba Falsa" to the Los Tigres del Norte tribute compilation El Más Grande Homenaje a Los Tigres del Norte. In 2002, her albums Pa' Morirse de Amor and Lotofire were re-released. The same year, Lotofire was edited in the United States by Higher Octave.

The label also released a 12″ compilation of remixes titled The Lotofire Mixes. A 2003 compilation EP titled 4 was released in Argentina and Chile. It contained songs from Pa' Morirse de Amor and Lotofire.

For her next record Guerra worked with five producers. Sweet & Sour, Hot y Spicy was released in 2004. The singles were "Ojos claros, Labios rosas" and "Quiéreme mucho". In 2005, Guerra received a Latin Grammy nomination for Best Alternative Music Album for Sweet & Sour, Hot y Spicy. In 2007, she released her first live record, Teatro Metropólitan.

Guerra left EMI and created her own record label, Homey Company. In 2008, she started working on her next record. She asked several male musicians to send her a harmonic sequence that she would use as a base to compose the songs for the album. Some of the collaborators were Enrique Bunbury, Juanes and Gustavo Santaolalla. Her fifth album Hombre Invisible was released in 2009. In October 2010, it won the award for Best Alternative Music Album at the 11th Latin Grammy Awards. Hombre Invisible was also nominated for Best Recording Package.

The same year, Guerra released a version of the popular song "La Llorona" on the album Bimexicano, Nuestros Clásicos Hechos Rock. In the fall of 2010, Guerra appeared on the cover of T magazine. In October 2011, she sang the "Himno Nacional Mexicano" in the Pan American Games closing ceremony. A jazz version of Hombre Invisible, titled Invisible Man, was released on November 22, 2011. In November 2012 Guerra participated in a tribute to Chavela Vargas with Eugenia León and Tania Libertad. The event took place on November 27 in Carnegie Hall and on December 5 at the Walt Disney Concert Hall.

During February 2013, Guerra released her first live DVD, Ciclos, recorded live at Mexico city's Teatro Metropólitan on December 9, 2011. On July 29, it was confirmed that Guerra had finished production of three tracks for her new album. A year later, in July 2014, she released the live album El Origen.

She was a guest judge on Season 3, Episode 5 of the reality television series Project Runway Latin America, where the goal was to design an outfit for her. She also performed her song "Mi Playa" at the beginning of the episode.

Ely Guerra was named a UC Regents' Lecturer for 2015-2016. As part of this she visited a Spanish 150 class at UCLA in 2015. "[She] is an internationally acclaimed artist whose artistic and intellectual interests include literature, film, art and fashion, and who has used them all for positive statements on women's independence and creativity", said Professor Héctor Enrique Calderón Valle, chair of the Department of Spanish and Portuguese, who hosted her in his class.

Guerra released her album Zion on September 23, 2019, to excellent reviews.

== Discography ==
=== Studio albums ===
- Ely Guerra (1995)
- Pa' Morirse de Amor (1997)
- Lotofire (1999)
- Sweet & Sour, Hot and Spicy (2004)
- Hombre Invisible (2009)
- Invisible Man (2011) – re-release jazz version
- Zion (2019)

=== Live albums ===
- Teatro Metropólitan (2007)
- Plug and Play (2007)
- El Origen (2014)

=== DVDs ===
- Ciclos (2013)

=== EPs ===
- 4 (2003)

== Collaborations ==
Year	Song	Artist	Album
1995	"Llorando Arroz"	Fratta	Acústico Desliz (1995)
1995	"Ya No Hay Lágrimas / Que Me Maten"	Fratta	Acústico Desliz (1995)
1995	"No Será Mañana (Fuegos del Alma)"	Fratta	Acústico Desliz (1995)
1995	"Fiebre de Selva"	Fratta	Acústico Desliz (1995)
1998	"Morir Igual"	Fratta	Un mundo una esperanza (1998)
2000	"De Perros Amores"	Control Machete	Amores Perros (Soundtrack from the Motion Picture) (2000)
2000	"Bajo advertencia"	Forseps	.02 (2000)
2001	"El duelo"	La Ley	La Ley MTV Unplugged (2001)
2001	"Solidão"	Quem	Fusión Malagueña (2009)
2002	"Solo voy"	Sussie 4	Música moderna (2002)
2006	"¿A dónde van los muertos?"	Kinky	Reina (2006)
2008	"Como quiero verte"	José Fors	Dr. Frankenstein: La Ópera Rock (2008)
2008	"El acuerdo"	José Fors	Dr. Frankenstein: La Ópera Rock (2008)
2008	"El pago"	José Fors	Dr. Frankenstein: La Ópera Rock (2008)
2009	"Noviembre"	Inspector	Inspector (2009)
2009	"Milagro Catastrófico"	Vallín	Bendito Entre las Mujeres (2009)
2009	"Un Sentimiento de Amor"	Celso Piña	Sin Fecha de Caducidad (2009)
2009	"Amor a tientas"	Flow	Echo en México (2009)
2010	"South Side Life"	Minus the Bear	Your Private Sky (2010)
2010	"Sin remedio"	Nawal	Ecco (2010)
2011	"Júrame"	Alondra de la Parra	Travieso Carmesí (2011)
2011	"Cielito Lindo"	Alondra de la Parra	Travieso Carmesí (2011)
2011	"La Llorona"	Alondra de la Parra	Travieso Carmesí (2011)
2011	"Solamente una vez"	Alondra de la Parra	Travieso Carmesí (2011)
2011	"Vereda Tropical"	Alondra de la Parra	Travieso Carmesí (2011)
2012	"Es así"	Pato Machete	33 (2012)
2012	"La Barca"	Sussie 4	Radiolatina (2012)
2012	"Organik"	Mal'Akh	Néctar (2012)
2012	"Tabú" (Gustavo Cerati Cover)	Diego García	Argentina Songbook (2013)
2012	"Zombilaridad"	Various Artists	Soundtrack El Santos Vs La Tetona Mendoza (2013)
2012	"Espiral"	2+	Camino sin tu voz (2012)
2013	"Corazón De Tierra"	Nacho Maldonado	"Venus La Voz Del Tiempo" (2013)
2013	"La Mar"	Nacho Maldonado	"Venus La Voz Del Tiempo" (2013)
2013	"Estrellas De Fuego"	Nacho Maldonado	"Venus La Voz Del Tiempo" (2013)
2013	"Somos Lo Que Soñamos" (Ft Ruben Albarrán)	Nacho Maldonado	"Venus La Voz Del Tiempo" (2013)
2013	"La Voz Del Tiempo"(Ft Ruben Albarrán)	Nacho Maldonado	"Venus La Voz Del Tiempo" (2013)
2013	"El Quinto Sol" (Ft Jossie Telch)	Nacho Maldonado	"Venus La Voz Del Tiempo" (2013)
2013	"Algo Tonto (Something Stupid)"	César Costa	A mi manera (2013)
2013	"Melodia que no se va"	Lost Acapulco	
2014	"Ring Then Bells" (Bob Dylan Cover)	Johnny Indovina	"Trials Of The Winter" (2014)
2014	"I Love The Way You See The World"	Johnny Indovina	"Trials Of The Winter" (2014)
2014	"The Truth Inside A Lie"	Johnny Indovina	"Trials Of The Winter" (2014)
2014	"Tu Sonrisa"	Los De Abajo	
2014	"Hedonista"	Banda Filarmonica del CECAM	Xëëw (Volumen 1) (2014)

== Soundtrack work ==
In 2000 Guerra composed the song "Dime cuándo comenzó el dolor" for the Amores perros movie soundtrack.

In 2001 Guerra wrote the theme for the film De la calle.

Guerra was the voice of Grace in the dubbed Mexican version of Disney's movie Home on the Range. She also contributed vocals for the soundtrack.

In 2007, "Bésame" was featured on the soundtrack of the Mexican TV series S.O.S.: Sexo y otros Secretos.

In 2008 she covered Selena's "Bidi Bidi Bom Bom" for the Los Campeones de la Lucha Libre soundtrack.

In 2010 Guerra sang the song "Amorcito corazón" for the 2013 film Reencarnación.

In 2012, Guerra contributed vocals to the main theme of the Mexican animated movie El Santos vs. La Tetona Mendoza.

== Touring and performances ==
=== Vive Latino ===
Guerra participated in this festival in 1998, 2000, 2004, 2005, 2007, 2010 and 2014. During her performance at Vive Latino 2005, she had a wardrobe malfunction, exposing her right breast. During the Festival Vive Latino 2006, she had a guest appearance during Kinky's performance of "¿A dónde van los muertos?"

== Latin Grammy nominations ==
Year	Nominee / work	Award	Result
2005	Sweet & Sour, Hot y Spicy	Latin Grammy Award for Best Alternative Music Album	Nominated
2010	Hombre Invisible	Latin Grammy Award for Best Alternative Music Album	Won
2010	Hombre Invisible	Latin Grammy Award for Best Recording Package	Nominated
