= Salvavidas de Hielo =

Studio album by Jorge Drexler
- Released: September 22, 2017
- Genre: Latin pop
- Length: 40:07
- Label: Warner Music
- Producer: Carles Campón

Jorge Drexler chronology
Bailar en la Cueva (2010)	Salvavidas de Hielo (2017)

Singles from Salvavidas de Hielo
- 1. "Telefonía" Released: July 7, 2017; 2. "Silencio" Released: August 4, 2017

Salvavidas de Hielo (English: Ice Life Jacket) is the eleventh studio album by Uruguayan singer and songwriter Jorge Drexler, released on September 22, 2017, through Warner Music. It was produced by Carles Campón, frequent collaborator of Drexler, and features collaborations with Chilean singer Mon Laferte and Mexican singers Julieta Venegas and Natalia Lafourcade, the latter in the title track.

At the 19th Annual Latin Grammy Awards, the album was nominated for Album of the Year, Best Engineered Album and won Best Singer-Songwriter Album while the song "Telefonía" won both Song of the Year and Record of the Year. The album was also nominated for Best Latin Rock, Urban or Alternative Album at the 60th Annual Grammy Awards.

== Background ==
The album was recorded in both Mexico City and Madrid, the name of the album and also of the eleventh track comes from the idea of an ice life vest that, even if it's doomed to melt it's still helpful, according to Drexler, "it is a hommage to the ephemeral, to the things that, even if they are not eternal, are very important to people and keep them afloat, not everything that makes us endure life last long, sometimes the very brief things leave a big mark".

The album marked a shift towards a more acoustic approach, using mainly guitars and vocals, different from his previous effort, Bailar en la Cueva. Drexler draw inspirations from the countries where he recorded the album, the song "Pongamos que hablo de Martinez" ("Let's Say I Talk About Martinez") is dedicated to Spanish singer Joaquín Sabina, whose first surname is Martinez, while the music video for the song "Movimiento" ("Movement") features Lorena Ramírez, a Mexican Rarámuri woman who won a hundred kilometres marathon wearing only sandals and traditional clothing, whose story led Drexler to ask director Lorenzo Hagerman, to contact her and ask her to appear in the video.

== Critical reception ==
Professional ratings
Review scores
Source	Rating
AllMusic	3.5/5 stars
The Guardian	3/5 stars

Mariano Prunes from Allmusic gave the album three and a half stars out of five, writing that while the album was a "quintessential Jorge Drexler album", at times the music "feels smothered by the weight of its own weightlessness", he also commented on the features in the album writing that they "add a much welcome vocal counterbalance and easily become the album's highlights". Neil Spencer from The Guardian rated the album three stars out of five calling it "gentle but classy".

== Track listing ==
All tracks were produced by Carles Campón.

Salvavidas de Hielo
No.	Title	Writer(s)	Length
1.	"Movimiento"	Jorge Drexler	3:51
2.	"Telefonía"	Drexler	3:04
3.	"Silencio"	Drexler	3:27
4.	"Pongamos que hablo de Martinez"	Drexler	3:02
5.	"Estalactitas"	Drexler	4:21
6.	"Asilo" (featuring Mon Laferte)	Drexler	3:03
7.	"Abracadabras" (featuring Julieta Venegas)	David Aguilar, Drexler	3:38
8.	"Mandato"	Drexler	4:52
9.	"Despedir a los glaciares"	Drexler	3:37
10.	"Quimera"	Drexler	3:38
11.	"Salvavidas de hielo" (featuring Natalia Lafourcade)	Drexler	3:29
Total length:			40:07

== Charts ==
Chart performance for Salvavidas de Hielo
Chart (2014)	Peak position
Spain Albums Chart (PROMUSICAE)	7
