= Capital Inicial =

Brazilian rock band

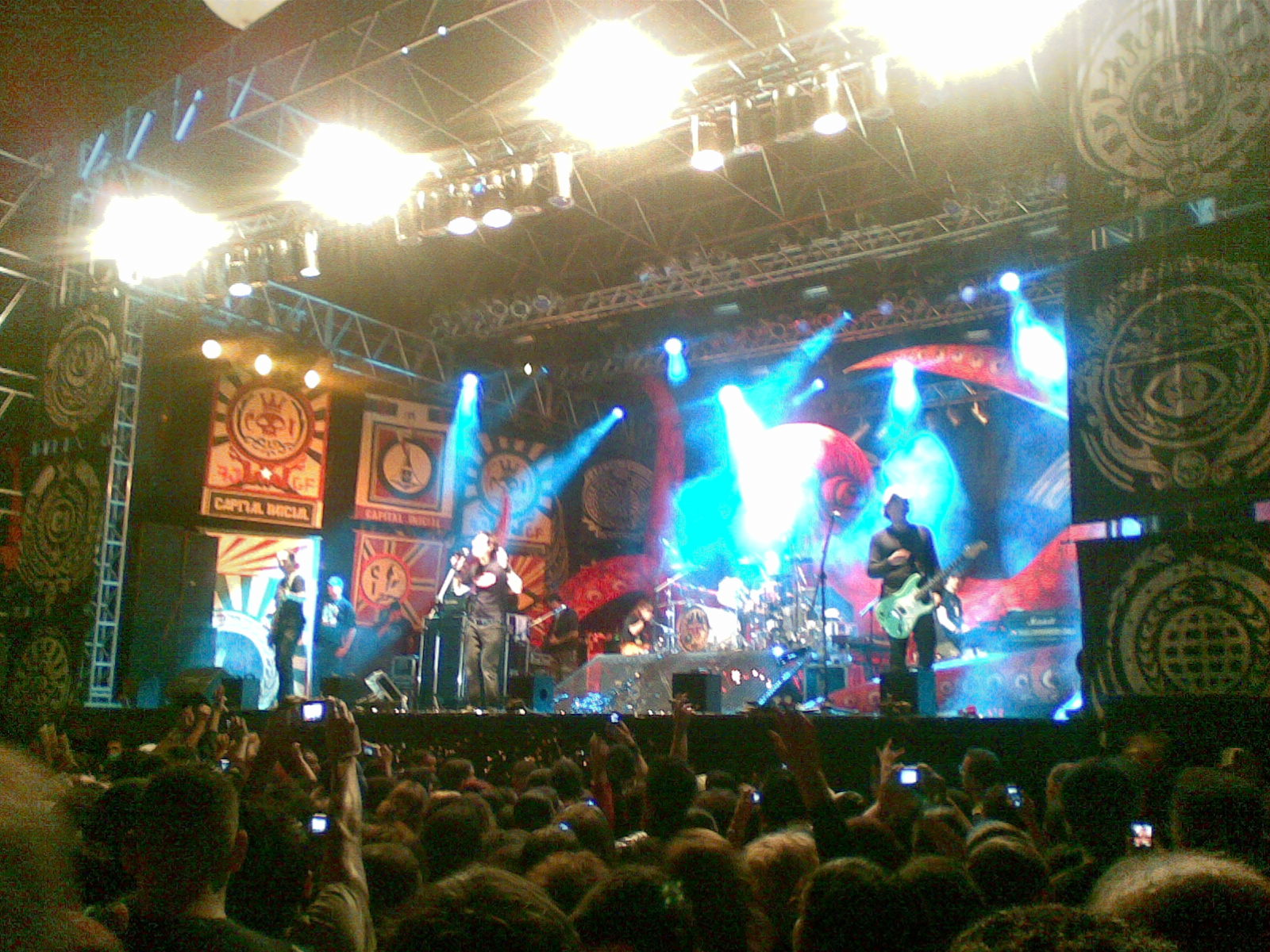
- Capital Inicial performing on November 12, 2008

Background information
- Origin: Brasília, DF, Brazil
- Genres: Post-punk; new wave; pop rock; post-grunge
- Years active: 1982–present
- Labels: Sony BMG
- Spinoff of: Aborto Elétrico
- Members: Fê Lemos; Flávio Lemos; Dinho Ouro Preto; Yves Passarell
- Past members: Loro Jones; Murilo Lima; Bozo Barretti
- Website: www.capitalinicial.com.br

Capital Inicial is a Brazilian rock band from Brasília flourished in the 1980s, saw a resurgence in the late 1990s, and extended into the 2000s.

== History ==
The band has recorded fourteen studio albums, five live albums and six DVDs in their 40-year career. They were a huge success in the early and mid-2000s, being one of the most popular bands in Brazil.

Former members of Renato Russo's pioneering post-punk band Aborto Elétrico teamed up to form the Capital Inicial, continuing to perform the same type of music. Brothers Fê Lemos and Flávio Lemos joined guitarist Loro Jones and vocalist Dinho Ouro Preto. All of them are based in Brasília. With similar songs as Aborto Elétrico's repertoire, the Capital Inicial followed in their path. The first time that Capital Inicial played in Rio was on July 23, 1983, opening a Lobão show at the Circo Voador. In 1984, they released their first single, "Descendo o Rio Nilo" and "Leve Desespero", with good repercussions. The latter song was included in the film Areias Escaldantes. In April 1985, Capital Inicial succeeded in having their Descendo o Rio Nilo included on the compilation Os Intocáveis. In the next year, the group recorded their first album, Capital Inicial, which had the hits "Psicopata", "Música Urbana" and "Fátima" selling 200,000 copies. This was followed by a period of many live shows.

In 1987, keyboardist Bozo Barretti, who had participated in the album, joined the band, who recorded a second album, Independência. With a pop-based sonority, the album sold half as much as the first. In November, the band opened for Sting at a packed Maracanã.

In December 1988, the group released their third album, Você Não Precisa Entender, which was assaulted by commercialism. The album sold only 50,000 copies. Understanding that they were losing their punk rock fans and weren't gaining pop fans, in their fourth album, Todos os Lados, they replaced standardized keyboards with aggressive guitars. But the change of direction came too late. The album sold a little more than 30,000 copies, and their fifth album, Eletricidade, barely sold 20,000 copies. This crisis provoked the departure of Bozzo Barretti and Dinho Ouro Preto and the acquisition of a new vocalist, Murilo Lima, with whom their sixth album, the independent Rua 47, was recorded in 1994. In 1996, they recorded the live album Capital Inicial ao Vivo, and in 1998, Murilo Lima left the band.

In 2000, the band release an unplugged album recorded at a Brazilian MTV live concert. This album became a tremendous hit in Brazil. As of 2006, the band does regular concerts in major Brazilian cities, enjoying great success with older Aborto Elétrico songs as well as newly recorded material.

== Band members ==
=== Current members ===
- Fê Lemos – drums, percussion (1982–present)
- Flávio Lemos – bass guitar (1982–present)
- Dinho Ouro Preto – lead vocals, guitars (1982–1993, 1998–present)
- Yves Passarell – guitars (2002–present)

=== Additional musicians ===
- Fabiano Carelli – guitars
- Robledo Silva – keyboards, guitars, backing vocals

=== Former members ===
- Loro Jones – guitars (1982–2002)
- Bozzo Barretti – keyboards, backing vocals (1987–1992)
- Murilo Lima – vocals (1993–1997)

== Discography ==
=== Studio albums ===
- (1986) Capital Inicial
- (1987) Independência
- (1988) Você Não Precisa Entender
- (1989) Todos os Lados
- (1991) Eletricidade
- (1998) Atrás dos Olhos
- (2002) Rosas e Vinho Tinto
- (2004) Gigante!
- (2005) MTV Especial: Capital Inicial - Aborto Elétrico
- (2007) Eu Nunca Disse Adeus
- (2010) Das Kapital
- (2012) Saturno
- (2014) Viva a Revolução
- (2018) Sonora

=== Live albums ===
- (2000) Acústico MTV: Capital Inicial
- (2008) Multishow ao Vivo: Capital Inicial em Brasília
- (2012) Rock in Rio 2011 - Capital Inicial
- (2015) Acústico NYC
- (2022) Capital Inicial 4.0

=== Video albums ===
- (2000) Acústico MTV: Capital Inicial
- (2005) MTV Especial: Capital Inicial - Aborto Elétrico
- (2008) Multishow ao Vivo: Capital Inicial em Brasília
- (2012) Rock in Rio 2011 - Capital Inicial
- (2015) Acústico NYC
- (2022) Capital Inicial 4.0
