= Una Canción Me Trajo Hasta Aquí =

Single by Jorge Drexler

from the album Amar la Trama
- Released: February 2010
- Recorded: November 1 – November 4, 2009 at Cata Studios in Madrid, Spain
- Genre: Latin pop
- Length: 3:18
- Label: Warner
- Songwriter: Jorge Drexler
- Producer: Matías Cella

Jorge Drexler singles chronology
""Sea" (with Mercedes Sosa)" (2009)	"Una Canción Me Trajo Hasta Aquí" (2010)	"Que El Soneto Nos Tome Por Sorpresa" (2011)

Music video
- "Una Canción Me Trajo Hasta Aquí" on YouTube

"Una Canción Me Trajo Hasta Aquí" ("A Song Brought Me Here") is a song written and performed by Uruguayan recording artist Jorge Drexler. It was released in February 2010 by Warner Music as the first single from his album Amar la Trama. The track was produced by Matías Cella and co-produced by Drexler and Carles Campi Campón. The album was recorded in four days, (November 1–4, 2009) at Cata Studios in Madrid, Spain, a television studio, in front of a small audience who were selected in an online contest. The reason to record the album under this format was to avoid the "coldness" of the recording studio. Drexler performed lead vocals, played guitar, and was joined by a band composed of additional guitarists, a rhythm section, a horn section, backup vocalists and auxiliary musicians.

The song received positive reviews. Jason Birchmeier of AllMusic in his review of Amar la Trama named it a "standout worthy of special mention." In her review for Billboard magazine, Judy Cantor-Navas noted that the lyrics were "poetic", addressing familiar themes for the singer: fated encounters, global wanderings, the South-American experience and the universal wonder of everyday moments. Even though the song was not promoted to radio in the United States, it received two nominations at the 11th Latin Grammy Awards, Record of the Year and Song of the Year, which were awarded to Mexican band Camila for the song "Mientes". While reviewing the nominees for Song of the Year, Leila Cobo, also from Billboard magazine, proclaimed the track as "lilting" and "almost innocent" that is appealing in its simplicity and arrangement.

== Personnel ==
- Jorge Drexler – main performer, co-producer, vocals, lyricist, guitar
- Matías Cella – producer, vocals
- Carles Campi Campón – co-producer, autoharp, glockenspiel, omnichord, guitar, vocals
- Roc Albero – flugelhorn
- Borja Barrueta – lap steel guitar, drums, vocals
- Josemi Carmona – Spanish guitar
- Ben Sidran – organ, vocals
