= Amar la Trama =

Studio album by Jorge Drexler
- Released: March 16, 2010
- Recorded: November 1 – November 4, 2009 at Cata Studios in Madrid, Spain
- Genre: Latin pop
- Length: 45:50
- Label: Warner
- Producer: Matías Cella

Jorge Drexler chronology
Cara B (2008)	Amar la Trama (2010)	Bailar en la Cueva (2014)

Singles from Amar la Trama
- 1. "Una Canción Me Trajo Hasta Aquí" Released: February 2010

Amar la Trama (transl. Loving the Plot) is the ninth studio album by Uruguayan recording artist Jorge Drexler. It was released by Warner Music on March 16, 2010, after a four-year gap since the release of his last album of original music. Drexler worked as co-producer, along with Matías Cella and Carles Campi Campón. The themes of the songs are his personal feelings inspired by journeys to Uruguay and Spain, his global wanderings, and the universal wonder of everyday moments.

The album received mostly positive reviews; critics commended Drexler's lyrics and his ability to perform live in front of a small audience during the recording sessions. The album entered the top five in Spain. The first single, "Una Canción Me Trajo Hasta Aquí", also received praise. La Trama Circular, a DVD documentary about the recording sessions, is included in the standard edition of the album. On September 8, 2010, Amar la Trama received four nominations for the 11th Latin Grammy Awards.

== Background ==
In 2005, Jorge Drexler became the first Uruguayan to win an Academy Award for Best Original Song, for his composition "Al Otro lado del Río" from the film The Motorcycle Diaries. The following year, Drexler recorded and released 12 Segundos de Oscuridad (Twelve Seconds of Darkness), an album that received a Grammy Award nomination. In 2008, Cara B, a live album that includes his greatest hits along with cover versions of songs written by Leonard Cohen, Caetano Veloso, and Kiko Veneno, was released. Cara B also received a Grammy nomination. The same year, Drexler wrote the score for the film The City of Your Final Destination. During 2009, Drexler worked with Colombian performer Shakira on the Spanish-language versions of her singles "She Wolf" and "Did it Again", and recorded Amar la Trama in Madrid, Spain. Drexler described the album as playful, without "the melancholy and anguish" of 12 Segundos.

== Recording ==
Amar la Trama was recorded from November 1–4, 2009, at Cata Studios in Madrid, in a television studio in front of a small audience who were selected in an online contest. He chose this format to avoid the "coldness" of the recording studio. Drexler was the lead vocalist and played guitar, and was joined by a band composed of additional guitarists, a rhythm section, a horn section, backup vocalists, and auxiliary musicians. All the tracks recorded were written by the singer, with the exception of "I Don't Worry About a Thing", a song by Mose Allison, which featured American pianist Ben Sidran. Leonor Watling performed vocals on the track "Toque de Queda"; Josemi Carmona is featured playing Spanish guitar on the song "Las Transeúntes". Drexler said, "In recent years I've realized that I sing better if I have an audience in front of me; I have learned to communicate better that way." The audience consisted of about 20 fans per session. This kept the musicians tense and alert; "the concentration was so great that it was perceived in the air, a silence so intense that you can hear it on the album." All the songs were available on the singer's official website prior to the album's release. The recording sessions were presented in the documentary La Trama Circular, directed by Ariel Hassan and Juan Aragonés. Drexler recorded the album with the working title of Mundo Abisal (Nether World), which refers to the deep sea and the inner world of people. He eventually settled on Amar la Trama (Loving the Plot) because he has a passion for the plot, "the space between the beginning and end, to be completed, in which things happen." The album cover is an original work by Manuel Rodríguez Arnabal.

== Music and lyrics ==
Jorge Drexler "Una Cancion Me Trajo Hasta Aquí" (2010)
Jorge Drexler's Latin Grammy-nominated song, "Una Cancion Me Trajo Hasta Aquí".

On the album, Drexler was lyrically inspired by Madrid, where most of the songs were written. Drexler feels is a very optimistic album, since the title begins with the letter "a", the same as in "affection". The songs feature a completely different sound treatment, a departure from the "light electronica" of previous albums. Amar la Trama is the result of an artistic evolution originated with the recording of Cara B; "with nine musicians playing and recording live on the album, I became interested in making music as in the past." This new concept was explored with a trio of wind instruments and three percussionists, which brings great vitality and achieves bright and expansive sounds. The lyrics are very personal, and choose meaning over sonority. The first track, "Tres Mil Millones de Latidos", is a song about existence that plays with the theme of identity, which is often present in Drexler's lyrics. "Noctiluca" is a gift to his son, since "having a child is the best experience to lose the fear of feelings." The inspiration for this song was a phosphorescent sea, lit by Noctiluca scintillans, that he observed at Cabo Polonio, Uruguay.

== Reception ==
Professional ratings
Review scores
Source	Rating
AllMusic	4/5 stars
Billboard	positive
Rolling Stone	5/5 stars

The album received mostly positive reviews. Jason Birchmeier of AllMusic said it was "nothing short of tremendous" and "excellent". He praised Drexler's writing abilities and his courage in recording an album in front of a live audience; Birchmeier said that "Una Canción Me Trajo Hasta Aquí", "Mundo Abisal", and "La Trama y el Desenlace" were standouts worthy of special mention. Darío Vico of Rolling Stone gave the album a perfect score of five stars, naming the album a resounding success and a "big- bang curious emotional process." Argentinian magazine, The Magazine, recognized Drexler as a "master" at designing memorable melodies, and maintaining a high literary level while writing lyrics. In her review for Billboard magazine, Judy Cantor-Navas noted that the lyrics were "poetic", and addressed familiar themes for the singer: fated encounters, global wanderings, the South American experience, and the universal wonder of everyday moments. She praised "Toque de Queda", since "Drexler returns to his Southern roots musically and thematically." Cantor commented that the first track, "Tres Mil Millones de Latidos", seems "fuzzy" since the arrangement diverts attention from Drexler's voice. Drexler received four nominations at the 11th Latin Grammy Awards, including Best Singer-Songwriter Album for Amar la Trama, Best Long Form Video for La Trama Circular (shared with Ariel Hassan), and Record of the Year and Song of the Year for the single "Una Canción Me Trajo Hasta Aquí". The included DVD, La Trama Circular, was nominated for a Premio de la Música by the Sociedad General de Autores y Editores in Spain, for Best Musical Audiovisual Production.

== Track listing ==
All tracks are written by Jorge Drexler, except where noted.

No.	Title	Length
1.	"Tres Mil Millones de Latidos"	3:48
2.	"La Trama y el Desenlace"	4:06
3.	"Las Transeúntes"	5:03
4.	"La Nieve en la Bola de Nieve"	4:53
5.	"Mundo Abisal"	4:08
6.	"Toque de Queda"	3:48
7.	"Una Canción Me Trajo Hasta Aquí"	3:18
8.	"Aquiles, por su talón es Aquiles"	3:35
9.	"I Don't Worry About a Thing (written by Mose Allison)"	4:19
10.	"Noctiluca"	3:27
11.	"Todos a Sus Puestos"	3:03
12.	"Telón"	2:32
13.	"Críticas (deluxe edition bonus track)"	3:04

== Commercial performance ==
The album debuted and peaked at number 5 on the Spanish Album Charts on March 21, 2010, the highest debut of the week. Amar la Trama spent an additional week in the top ten and 26 weeks in the top 100.

Chart (2010)	Peak position
Spanish Albums Chart	5

== Charts ==
Chart performance for Amar la Trama
Chart (2010)	Peak position
Spanish Albums (PROMUSICAE)	5

== Personnel ==
- Jorge Drexler – main performer, co-producer, vocals, lyricist, guitar
- Matías Cella – producer, vocals
- Carles Campi Campón – co-producer, autoharp, glockenspiel, omnichord, guitar, vocals
- Roc Albero – flugelhorn
- Borja Barrueta – lap steel guitar, drums, vocals
- Josemi Carmona – Spanish guitar
- Ben Sidran – organ, vocals
- Josema Martín – marimba, vocals
- Sebastián Merlín – marimba, vocals
- Leo Sidran – marimba
- Ángela Cervantes – vocals
- Leonor Watling – vocals
- Xavi Lozano – vocals

== See also ==
- 2010 in Latin music
