= Estrella María Benzo Blas =

Spanish singer

Estrella
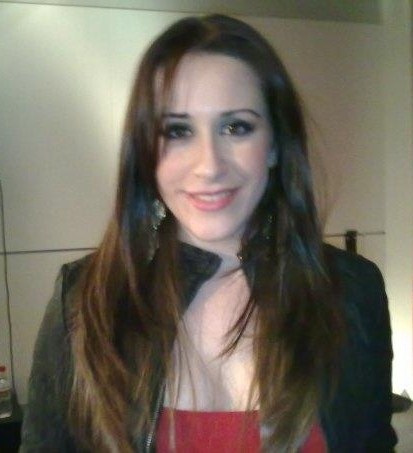
- Spanish singer

Background information
- Also known as: Estrella
- Born: Estrella María Benzo Blas; 23 March 1985 (age 41)
- Origin: Seville, Andalusia, Spain
- Genres: R&B, pop, flamenco
- Instrument: Voice
- Years active: 2006–present
- Label: Warner Music Spain

Estrella María Benzo Blas, also known as Estrella, is a Spanish singer born in Seville.

== Discography ==
=== Albums ===
- Estrella
- Black Flamenco
