= Melon Diesel =

- Also known as: Treehouse
- Origin: Gibraltar
- Genres: Rock, pop rock, pop, dance-pop
- Years active: 1995–2003; 2021–present
- Labels: Sony Music
- Members: Dylan Ferro; Daniel Fa; Daniel Bugeja
- Past members: Guy Palmer; Adrian Pozo

Melon Diesel (also known as Treehouse) is a Gibraltarian pop rock band originally formed in Gibraltar in 1995, signed by Sony Music, who achieved popularity in Spain.

== History ==
Melon Diesel started playing under the name of 'Treehouse' in the early 1990s. The name was changed in 1995, based on an alcoholic drink served at a Gibraltar bar, The Admiral Collingwood, where the band used to perform regularly. The group moved to Madrid, Spain in the late nineties to try their luck and eventually got signed by Sony music, Spain. For their first album they moved to London to work with producer Barry Sage, recording La Cuesta de Mr. Bond at Chapel Studios in Lincolnshire and Moody Studios in London. La Cuesta de Mister Bond went Platinum selling around 180,000 copies. The title of this album is a kind of tribute to James Bond, since one of his films, The Living Daylights, was filmed in Gibraltar. After a very long tour of over 100 shows in support of their first album through Spain they recorded the follow-up album Hombre en el Espejo in Eurosonic Studios, Madrid with producer Nigel Walker. In 2003 they would record their last studio album with the original line up in Treviso, Venice (Italy) with producer Danilo Ballo. The group split up in 2003 forming two new bands, Area 52 and Taxi.

While Area 52 has remained in the local circuit in Gibraltar, Taxi retains frontman Dylan Ferro and have released five albums with some commercial success in Spain, and keeping alive Melon Diesel's legacy.

== Band members ==
Dylan James Ferro - Vocals Daniel Fa - Guitars Daniel Bugeja - Guitars

=== Former members ===
- Dylan Ferro – lead vocals (1995–2003)
- Daniel Bugeja – guitars (1995–2003)
- Daniel Fa – guitars (1995–2003)
- Guy Palmer – bass (1995–2003)
- Adrian Pozo – drums (1995–2003)

== Discography ==
- 1999: La Cuesta de Mister Bond
- 2001: Hombre en el Espejo
- 2003: Real
