= Das Kapital (album) =

Studio album by Capital Inicial
- Released: June 2, 2010
- Genre: Alternative rock, garage rock
- Length: 35:17
- Label: Sony Music
- Producer: David Corcos

Capital Inicial chronology
Multishow ao Vivo: Capital Inicial em Brasília (2008)	Das Kapital (2010)	Rock in Rio: Capital Inicial (2012)

Singles from Das Kapital
- 1. "Depois da Meia-Noite" Released: May 4, 2010; 2. "Vivendo e Aprendendo" Released: August 12, 2010; 3. "Como se Sente" Released: April 14, 2011

Professional ratings
Review scores
Source	Rating
AllMusic	3.5/5 stars
Canal Pop	4/5 stars
O Globo	5/5 stars
Laboratório Pop	2/5 stars

Das Kapital is the twelfth studio album by Brazilian rock band Capital Inicial, released on June 2, 2010 through Sony Music. The album shares its title with the homonymous book written by Karl Marx.

== Track listing ==
No.	Title	Lyrics	English title	Length
1.	"Ressurreição"	Dinho, Alvin L., Yves Passarell	Resurrection	3:57
2.	"Depois da Meia-Noite"	Dinho, Pit Passarell	After Midnight	3:22
3.	"Como se Sente"	Dinho, Alvin L.	How Do You Feel	2:56
4.	"Eu Quero Ser Como Você"	Dinho, Alvin L.	I Want to Be Like You	3:04
5.	"A Menina que Não Tem Nada"	Dinho, Alvin L.	The Girl Who Has Nothing	2:48
6.	"Não Sei Porque"	Dinho, Alvin L.	I Don't Know Why	3:14
7.	"Melhor"	Dinho, Alvin L.	Better	2:19
8.	"Vamos Comemorar"	Dinho, Pit Passarell	Let's Celebrate	3:45
9.	"Eu Sei Quem Eu Sou"	Dinho, Alvin L.	I Know Who I Am	3:52
10.	"Marte em Capricórnio"	Dinho, Alvin L., Robledo Silva	Mars in Capricorn	3:00
11.	"Vivendo e Aprendendo"	Dinho, Alvin L., Yves	Live and Learn	3:00

== Personnel ==
=== Capital Inicial ===
- Fê Lemos: drums
- Flávio Lemos: bass guitar
- Dinho Ouro Preto: lead and backing vocals
- Yves Passarell: electric guitar, backing vocals

=== Additional musicians ===
- Fabiano Carelli: electric guitar
- Robledo Silva: keyboards, piano, backing vocals
- Lineu Andrade: acoustic guitar
- Koool G Murder (Eels): keyboards
