= Aquí y Ahora (Taxi album) =

Studio album by Taxi
- Released: May 25, 2010
- Genre: Latin pop
- Label: WEA Spain

Taxi chronology
Mirando Atrás (2008)	Aquí y Ahora (2010)

Aquí y Ahora is the 4th studio album by Gibraltarian pop rock band Taxi released on May 25, 2010.

AllMusic stated in its review of the album, "Taxi are one of many decent but not particularly distinctive mainstream Spanish-language rock bands, and their fourth album, Aquí y Ahora is as good an example of the genre as all of their previous work."

== Track listing ==
1. Algo de Amor
2. Perdido en la Calle
3. Aunque me pidas perdón
4. Ella
5. Polvo de Estrellas
6. En mi prisión
7. Un final de verdad
8. Somos más
9. Viento
10. Ahi te quedas
11. Se acabó
