= Bailar en la Cueva =

Studio album by Jorge Drexler
- Released: March 25, 2014
- Genre: Latin pop
- Length: 45:03
- Label: Warner Music
- Producers: Carlos Campón; Jorge Drexler; Eduardo Cabra

Jorge Drexler chronology
Amar la Trama (2010)	Bailar en la Cueva (2014)	Salvavidas de Hielo (2017)

Singles from Bailar en la Cueva
- 1. "Universos Paralelos" Released: February 25, 2014

Bailar en la Cueva (English: To Dance in the Cave) is the tenth studio album by Uruguayan singer and songwriter Jorge Drexler, released on March 25, 2014, through Warner Music. The album was produced by Carlos Campón and features collaborations from Brazilian singer Caetano Veloso and Chilean-French rapper Ana Tijoux. Li Saumet from Bomba Estéreo appears in the title track while Puerto Rican producer Eduardo Cabra co-produced the song "Todo Cae".

At the 15th Annual Latin Grammy Awards, the album was nominated for Album of the Year and won Best Singer-Songwriter Album, while the song "Universos Paralelos" was nominated for both Song of the Year and Record of the Year, winning the latter. The album also received a nomination for Best Latin Rock, Urban or Alternative Album at the 57th Annual Grammy Awards.

== Background ==
Inspiration for the album came to Drexler after traveling through Latin America for the past four years prior to the album, feeling "at home" everywhere he went, this deep connection with the continent led to the collaborations of the album and the mix of nationalities in them, with the song "Bolivia" being sung with Brazilian artist Caetano Veloso and "Universos Paralelos", a song with influences from Colombian music, featuring Chilean-French rapper Ana Tijoux.

The album was recorded in Madrid, Spain and Bogotá, Colombia, and resulted in a much more "danceable" album that Drexler's previous efforts, his decision to record in Colombia came after feeling a "generous energy" from the country, Drexler said that "we wanted to bring that atmosphere that I perceived, that optimism from contemporary Colombian music, and above all, the rhythm, the groove".

The song "Bolivia" is a homage to the country that sheltered Drexler's father, who fled from Nazi Germany as a German Jew at four years old with his parents during the Holocaust.

== Critical reception ==
Professional ratings
Review scores
Source	Rating
AllMusic	4/5 stars

Thom Jurek writing for AllMusic gave the album four out of five stars, commenting that "Though Bailar en la Cueva may be easy to listen to, it is one of his most musically mercurial efforts; one that defies compartmentalization even by his own adventurous standards". Jurek also commented on the songs "Universos Paralelos", writing that Tijoux's feature "lends a sultry, wispy rap to the backdrop to make this one of the set's most infectious tunes", and "Bolivia", calling it "provocative, spooky, and incantatory".

== Track listing ==
Bailar en la Cueva
No.	Title	Writer(s)	Producer(s)	Length
1.	"Bailar en la Cueva"	Jorge Drexler	Carlos Campón	4:02
2.	"Bolivia" (featuring Caetano Veloso)	Drexler	Campón	3:56
3.	"Data Data"	Ben Sidran, Leo Sidran, Drexler	Campón	4:24
4.	"La Luna de Rasquí"	Drexler	Campón	3:40
5.	"Universos Paralelos" (featuring Ana Tijoux)	Ana Tijoux, Drexler	Campón, Drexler	3:42
6.	"Todo Cae"	Drexler	Campón, Eduardo Cabra	4:12
7.	"Esfera"	Drexler	Campón	4:05
8.	"La Plegaria del Paparazzo"	Drexler	Campón	3:30
9.	"La Noche no es una Ciencia"	Drexler	Campón	3:34
10.	"El Triángulo de las Bermudas"	Drexler	Campón	3:14
11.	"Organdí"	Drexler	Campón	6:40
Total length:				45:03

== Charts ==
Chart performance for Bailar en la Cueva
Chart (2014)	Peak position
US Latin Pop Albums (Billboard)	7
Spain Albums Chart (PROMUSICAE)	7
