= Kiko Zambianchi =

Brazilian composer and singer (born 1960)

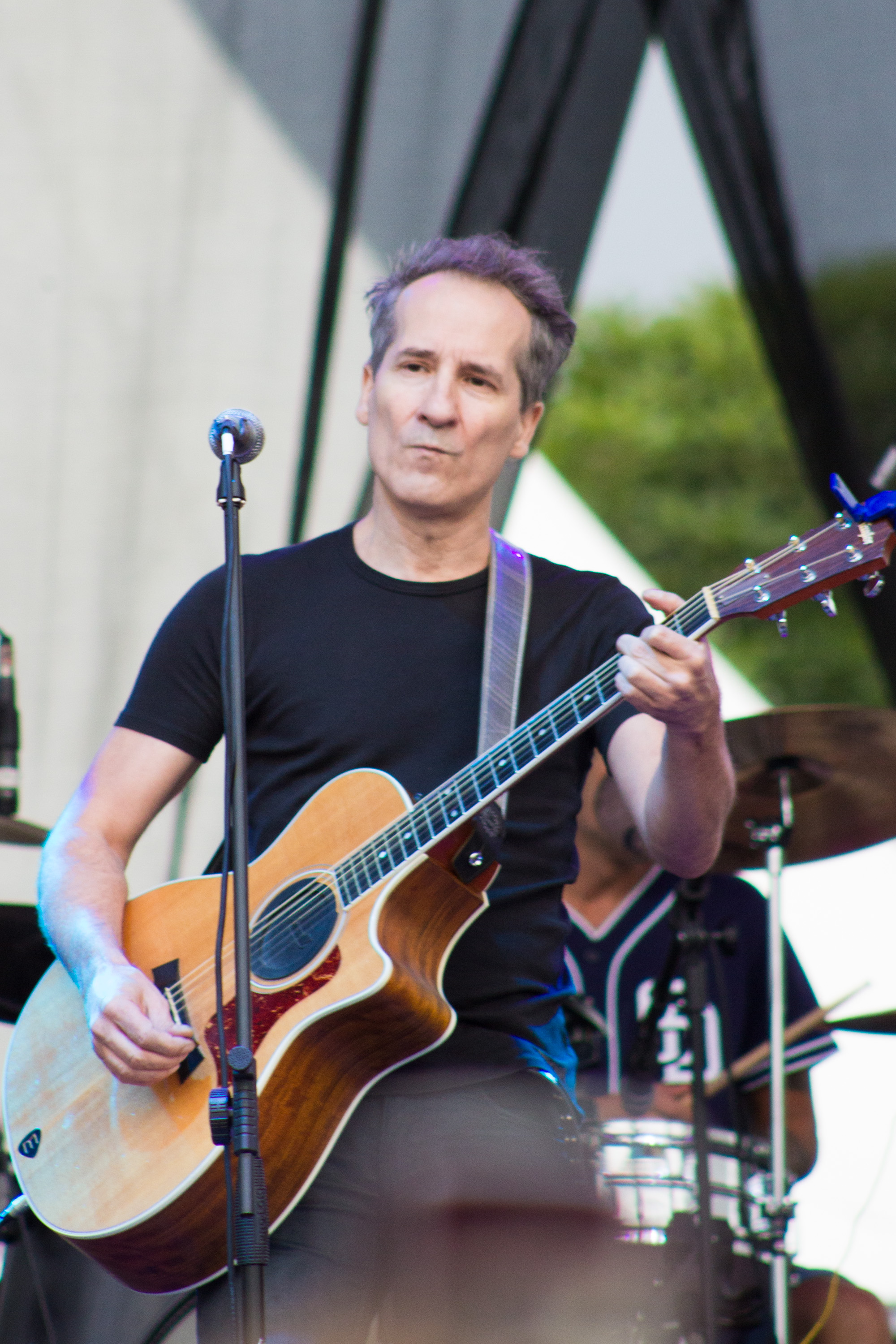
- Zambianchi in 2014

Background information
- Born: Francisco José Zambianchi; 14 October 1960 (age 65)
- Origin: Ribeirão Preto, São Paulo, Brazil
- Genres: MPB, rock
- Instruments: Vocals, guitar
- Years active: 1984–present
- Labels: EMI, East West
- Website: www2.uol.com.br/kikozambianchi

Kiko Zambianchi (born Francisco José Zambianchi in Ribeirão Preto) is a Brazilian composer and singer.

== Discography ==
- (1985) Choque
- (1986) Quadro Vivo
- (1987) Kiko Zambianchi
- (1989) Era das Flores
- (1997) KZ
- (2001) Disco Novo
- (2013) Acústico ao Vivo
