= Al otro lado del río =

Single by Jorge Drexler

from the album The Motorcycle Diaries (Original Motion Picture Soundtrack)
- Language: Spanish
- Released: 15 March 2005
- Studio: Smart Studios (Madison, Wisconsin)
- Genre: Latin pop; soundtrack
- Length: 3:13
- Label: Dro East West
- Songwriter: Jorge Drexler
- Producers: Jorge Drexler; Leo Sidran

Music video
- "Al otro lado del río" on YouTube

"Al otro lado del río" (transl. "On the Other Side of the River") is a song by Uruguayan singer Jorge Drexler from the soundtrack album for the film The Motorcycle Diaries (2004). It was released as a single on 15 March 2005, by Dro East West. Besides the film's soundtrack, the song was included in reissue editions of Drexler's seventh studio album Eco (2004) as a bonus track. In June 2020, he performed the song at the launch show of the app 342 Amazônia at Circo Voador.

== Academy Award ==
"Al otro lado del río" received the Academy Award for Best Original Song at the 77th Academy Awards, becoming the first Spanish language song, the second in a foreign language, to receive such an honor, and the first by a Uruguayan artist.

The Oscars ceremony caused controversy because Drexler was not allowed to perform the song since "he was not popular enough," according to the Spanish newspaper El País. Instead, Spanish actor Antonio Banderas and Mexican-American musician Carlos Santana sang the track, who were both introduced by actress Salma Hayek. Upon winning, Drexler recited two verses of the song a cappella at the podium. Despite the incident, Drexler said that he became friends with Banderas and wrote the poem "3 décimas para Antonio Banderas" for him in 2019.

== Awards and nominations ==
- Won: Academy Award for Best Original Song
- Nominated: Latin Grammy Award for Song of the Year

== Credits and personnel ==
Credits adapted from the liner notes of The Motorcycle Diaries (Original Motion Picture Soundtrack).

- Jorge Drexler – vocals, songwriting, performance, guitar, programming, production
- Leo Sidran – piano, percussion, programming, production
- Ana Laan – background vocals
- Jeff Eckels – bass
- Carina Voly – cello
- Ben Sidran – piano
- Jon Vriesacker – violin
- Mark Haines – recording, mixing at Smart Studios, Madison, WI
- Hector Coulon – additional recording at UML Studios
