= Jorge Drexler =

Uruguayan musician (born 1964)

- Drexler at the 2026 Latin Grammy Awards
- Born: Jorge Abner Drexler Prada; 21 September 1964 (age 62); Montevideo, Uruguay
- Occupations: Musician; singer; composer; actor; doctor
- Years active: 1996-present
- Partner: Leonor Watling
- Relatives: Ana Prada (cousin)
- Website: www.jorgedrexler.com (in Spanish)

Jorge Abner Drexler Prada (born 21 September 1964) is a Uruguayan musician, actor and medical doctor. Drexler won the 2005 Academy Award for Best Original Song for "Al Otro Lado del Río" from The Motorcycle Diaries, becoming the first Uruguayan to win an Oscar and marking the first time a Spanish-language song received the award.

== Early life ==
Jorge Abner Drexler Prada was born on 21 September 1964 in Montevideo, the eldest child of Günther Drexler Schlein (1935–2024) and Lucero Prada da Silveira (1939–2018). His father was a German Jew from Berlin who, at the age of four, fled Nazi persecution in Germany together with his parents, Georg and Ruth Drexler. The family sought refuge in Bolivia before later settling in Uruguay. His mother was a Roman Catholic of mixed Spanish, French, and Portuguese ancestry.

Drexler was raised Jewish and attended both public schools and Jewish educational institutions, including the Instituto Ariel Hebreo Uruguayo. He began playing piano at age five, before attending guitar and composition classes. Although he had an interest in music, he studied medicine, like both of his parents, graduating from the University of the Republic, and specializing in otorhinolaryngology. He also worked as a lifeguard and as a home-visit physician. During his time in medical school, he took a break to hitchhike through Brazil.

== Career ==
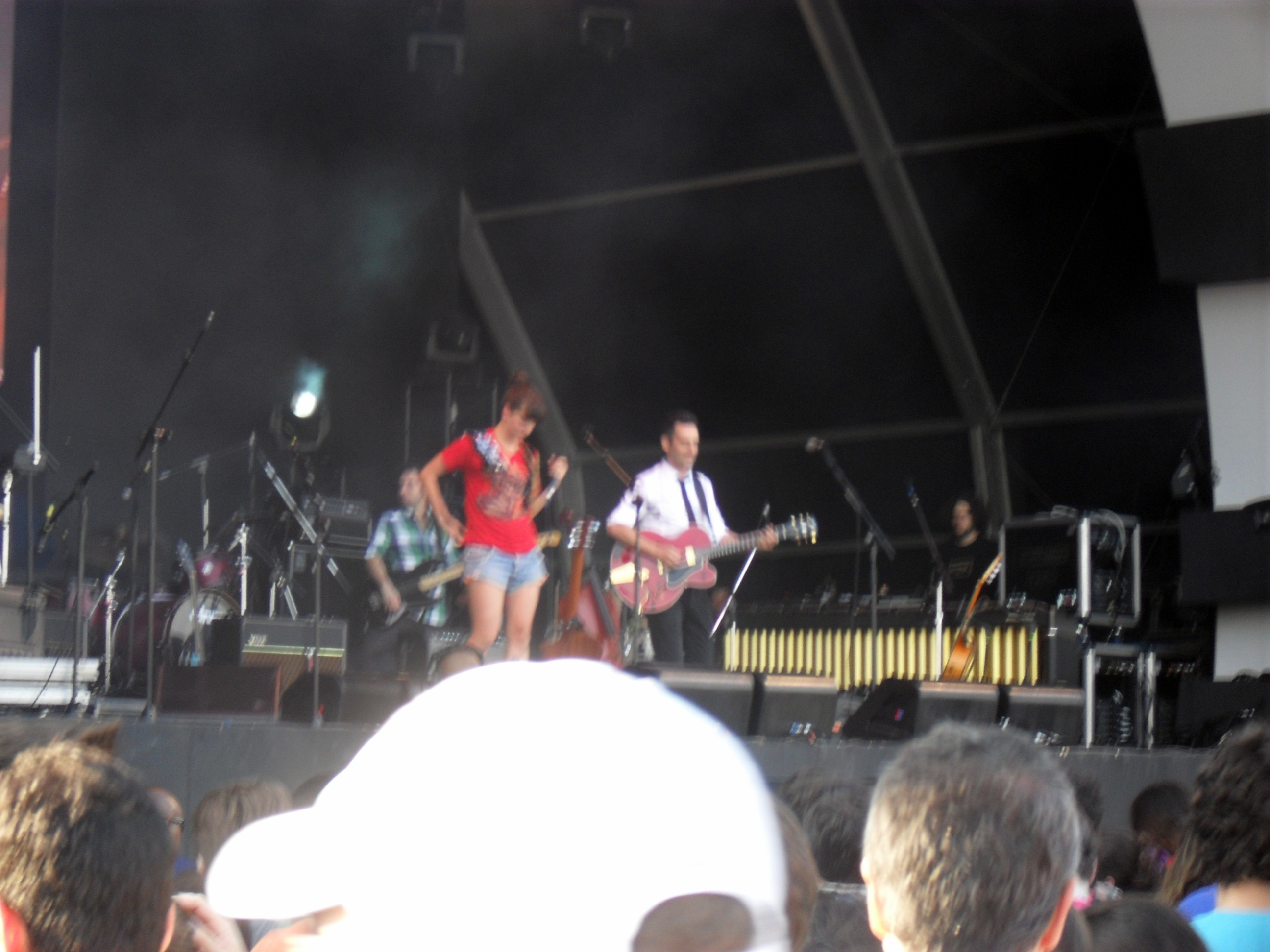
Jorge Drexler performing with Tiê at the 2011 Rock in Rio Festival in Rio de Janeiro, Brazil.

In 1995, after opening for Spanish singer-songwriter Joaquín Sabina at a concert at the Teatro de Verano in Montevideo, Drexler was invited to Madrid by Sabina, who introduced him to other prominent musicians in the Spanish music scene. In Spain, Drexler recorded the album Vaivén in 1996 with Spanish musicians. Vaivén included some old songs from his previous releases mixed with new compositions. He moved to Spain and recorded another four albums: Llueve (1997), Frontera (1999), Sea (2001) and Eco (2004). In 2001, Drexler co-wrote two songs for Spanish singer Rosario Flores ("Agua y Sal" and "Rosa y Miel") for her album Muchas Flores.

Drexler's song "Al Otro Lado del Río" appeared in the internationally acclaimed film The Motorcycle Diaries. Though Drexler himself sang the song on the movie soundtrack, he was not allowed to perform the song at the 2005 Academy Awards, since "he was not popular enough," according to Spanish newspaper El País; Spanish actor Antonio Banderas and Mexican-American musician Carlos Santana sang the track instead. Upon winning, Drexler recited two verses of the song at the podium. Drexler became the first Uruguayan to win an Academy Award.

After that, he released 12 Segundos de Oscuridad (2006); this album contained ten original songs and two covers: "High and Dry" from British band Radiohead and "Disneylandia" from Brazilian Titãs. Although he lives most of the year in Spain, his albums were partially recorded in his native country with Uruguayan musicians. Juan Campodónico and Carlos Casacuberta, former members of rock band El Peyote Asesino, had produced Drexler's albums from Frontera to 12 Segundos De Oscuridad. In 2008, he released a double live album, recorded in different concerts in Spain: Cara B (2008), mainly filled with songs previously unreleased. During 2009, Drexler worked with Colombian performer Shakira on the Spanish-language versions of her singles "She Wolf", "Did it Again" and "Waka Waka (This Time for Africa).

Drexler recorded Amar la Trama (2010) on November 1–4, 2009 in Madrid in just four days, with musicians playing live in the studio. He described the album as playful, without "the melancholy and anguish" of 12 Segundos. Amar la Trama was recorded in a television studio in front of a small audience who were selected in an online contest. He chose this format to avoid the "coldness" of the recording studio.

His album Bailar en la Cueva, released in 2014, marked a stylistic shift toward more rhythm-focused and dance-oriented music. Drexler has described the album as contrasting with his earlier works, which he characterized as more introspective and nostalgic. He has also stated that it differs significantly from his previous album, referring to it as the “opposite pole” of Amar la Trama.

In 2017, he released Salvavidas de Hielo, an album constructed entirely from sounds produced by guitars and the human voice, including percussion effects. Tinta y Tiempo was released in 2022. His 2026 album Taracá was inspired by the candombe sound of Uruguay.

His music is a combination of Uruguayan traditional music (candombe, murga, milonga, tango), bossa nova, pop, jazz and electronic music. The lyrics also play an important role in his songs. Apart from love, reflections about identity, race and religions are a constant in his work.

== Personal life ==
Drexler was previously married to singer-songwriter Ana Laan. His current partner is Spanish actress/singer Leonor Watling, with whom he has two children, and who plays in the band Marlango.

His siblings, Daniel, Diego and Paula are also musicians. His cousins include scientist Alejandra Melfo and fellow singer Ana Prada.

== Awards and nominations ==
Aside from his Academy Award for Best Original Song, Drexler has been nominated five times at the Grammy Awards, for the albums Eco (2004), 12 Segundos de Oscuridad (2006), Cara B (2008), Bailar en la Cueva (2014), and Salvavidas de Hielo (2017); and received thirteen Latin Grammy Awards, twice for Best Singer-Songwriter Album and Record of the Year and one for Song of the Year. For his work writing Spanish-language versions of singles by Colombian singer-songwriter Shakira, he has received five ASCAP Latin Awards. Drexler also received a Goya Award in 2010 with the song "Que El Soneto Nos Tome Por Sorpresa", written for the Spanish film Lope; the same year he was named Commander of the Order of Isabella the Catholic for his musical contributions. Overall, Drexler has received 13 awards from 46 nominations. In November 2018, Drexler took home record of the year and the song of the year for "Telefonía" and the best singer-songwriter album for Salvavidas de Hielo at the Latin Grammys 2018.

== Discography ==
- La Luz Que Sabe Robar (Ayui, 1992)
- Radar (Ayui, 1994)
- Vaivén (Virgin, 1996)
- Llueve (Virgin, 1997)
- Frontera (Virgin, 1999)
- Sea (Virgin, 2001)
- Eco (Warner, 2004)
- 12 Segundos de Oscuridad (Warner, 2006)
- La Edad del Cielo (Warner, 2007)
- Cara B (Warner, 2008)
- Amar la Trama (Warner, 2010)
- Bailar en la Cueva (Warner, 2014)
- Salvavidas de Hielo (Warner, 2017)
- 30 Años (Warner, 2021)
- Tinta y tiempo (Sony Music, 2022)
- Taracá (Sony Music, 2026)
