= Cavatina (disambiguation) =

A cavatina is a musical form

Cavatina may also refer to:

== Music ==
=== Compositions ===
- Cavatina, composition by Alexandre Tansman
- Cavatina, composition by Fritz Kreisler
- Cavatina, composition by John Ireland
- Cavatina, composition by Cyril Scott
- Cavatina, composition by Kurt Weill
- Cavatina (Myers), composition by Stanley Myers, played by John Williams in The Deer Hunter movie
- Cavatina (Paisiello), aria Saper bramate from Giovanni Paisiello's The Barber of Seville, used in Stanley Kubrick's movie Barry Lyndon
- Cavatine (Saint-Saëns), composition by Camille Saint-Saëns
- Cavatina "Largo al Factotum Della Città", Renato Capecchi From Act 1 of Rossini's The Barber of Seville
- Cavatina, from Donizetti's Don Pasquale, recorded as single by Agostino Lazzari 1959
- Cavatina "Casta Diva", released as single by Maria Callas
- Cavatina from Donizetti's Emilia di Liverpool, released as single by Joan Sutherland 1965

=== Albums ===
- Cavatina, album by Göran Söllscher

=== Songs ===
- "He Was Beautiful" (Iris Williams song) (Cavatina), sung by Iris Williams, 1979
- "He's So Beautiful" (Cleo Laine song), English lyric version of "Cavatina", sung by Cleo Laine and John Williams, 1976
- "En Sång Om Gemenskap", Swedish lyric version of Cavatina, sung by Carola Häggkvist with Timo Korhonen guitar, 1984
