= Eco =

The word eco may refer to ecology or economics. The word, or the initials E.C.O., may also refer to:

== Arts and entertainment ==
- Eco (1987 video game), life-simulation video game (1987)
- Eco (2018 video game), simulation video-game (2018)
- Eco (Jorge Drexler album), 2004
- "Eco" (song), by Joan Thiele (2025)
- Emil Chronicle Online, Japanese MMO computer game (2005)
- English Chamber Orchestra, based in London
- Eco, character in the Dragonar Academy light-novel series
- Eco, fictional substance in the Jak and Daxter games
- Eco, character on the children's show The Shak
- Noticias ECO, defunct Mexican television news channel

== Government and politics ==
- Economic Cooperation Organization, founded in 1985 by Iran, Pakistan, and Turkey
- Environment and Conservation Organisations of Aotearoa New Zealand
- Environmental Commissioner of Ontario
- European Communications Office
- Executive Council of Ontario

== Technology ==
- .eco, top-level domain for the Internet
- eco - Association of the Internet Industry, the German Internet industry association
- Ecosia, web search engine
- Elementary column operations, performed on the columns of an elementary matrix in mathematics
- Engineering change order

== Other uses ==
- Eco (currency), proposed currency
- ECO: A Covenant Order of Evangelical Presbyterians, Christian denomination
- Edison Chouest Offshore, American shipbuilder
- Encyclopaedia of Chess Openings
- Energy Company Obligation, government scheme in Great Britain
- Enhanced custody officer, law enforcement role in England and Wales.
- Environmental Children's Organization, children's environment organization founded in the 1990s
- Equity carve-out
- Esporte Clube Osasco, Brazilian football club
- Eternally collapsing object
- Umberto Eco (1932–2016), Italian philosopher, semiotician, novelist

== See also ==
- Ecco (disambiguation)
- Echo (disambiguation)
- Eko (disambiguation)
- Ekko (disambiguation)
- Eckō Unltd., clothing brand
- EKCO, British electronics company
