= Alejandra Melfo =

Uruguayan/Venezuelan physicist

- Born: 26 February 1965 (age 61); Montevideo, Uruguay
- Education: Universidad de Los Andes; International School for Advanced Studies
- Occupations: Physicist, Microbiologist
- Employer: Universidad de Los Andes (Venezuela)

Alejandra Melfo (born 26 February 1965) is a Uruguayan-born Venezuelan physicist. She is known for her efforts studying and conserving glaciers, especially the Humboldt Corona, the last glacier in Venezuela.

== Early life ==
Melfo was born in Montevideo, the Uruguayan capital, and moved to Venezuela with her family in 1976 as refugees from dictatorship when she was 11. She later became a naturalized Venezuelan citizen. She studied at the University of the Andes (ULA) in Mérida and received her undergraduate degree in 1989, her master's degree in 1994, and became a faculty member at ULA whilst studying for a PhD in astrophysics at the International School for Advanced Studies (SISSA) in Trieste, Italy.

== Career ==
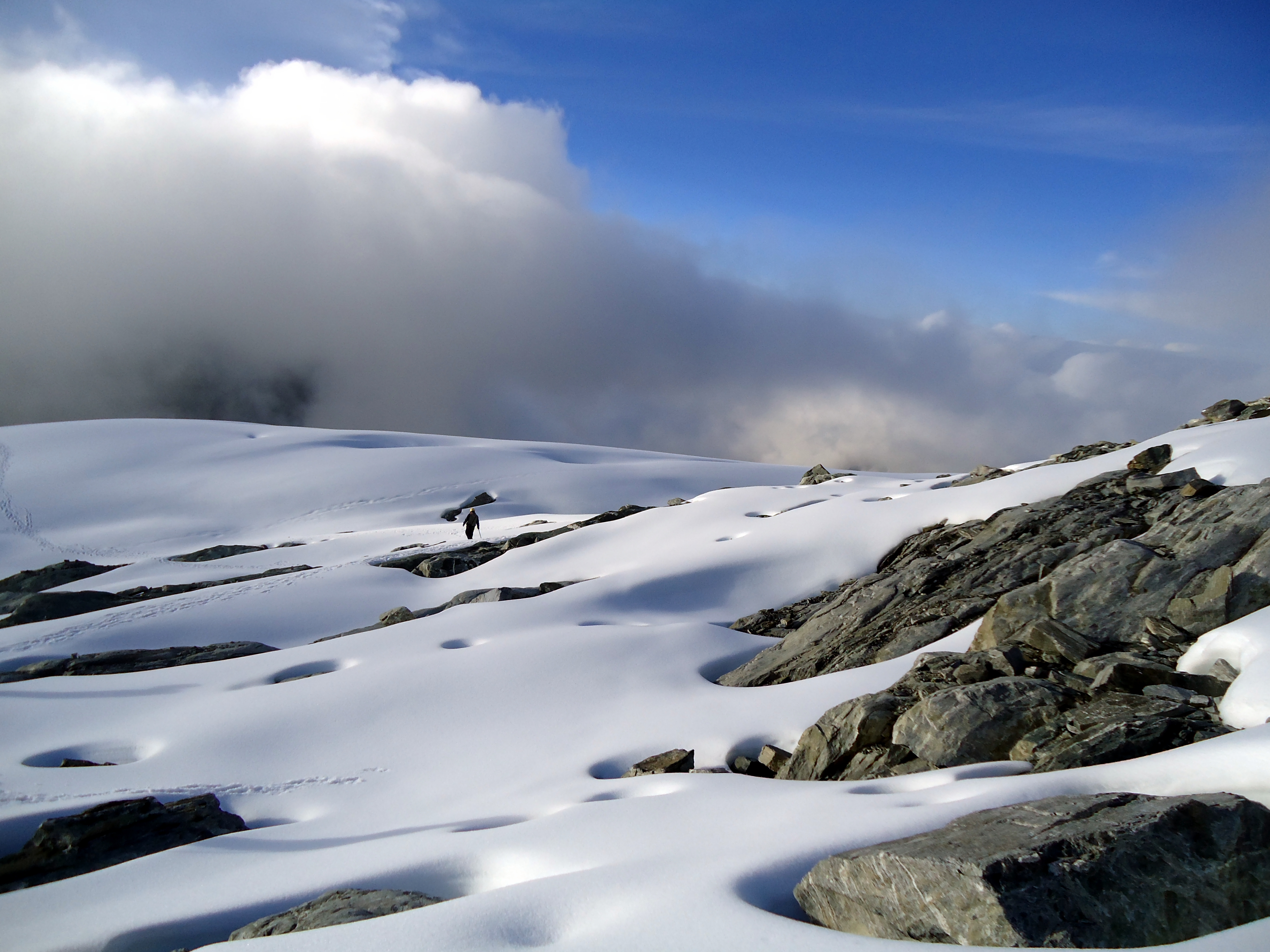
La Corona glacier, close to disappearing, has appeared recurrently in the works of Melfo.

At the University of the Andes, Melfo has worked in the Department of Physics and as director of the Center for Fundamental Physics. She has contributed to more than twenty scientific publications since the early 1990s.

Originally working on supersymmetric theory, her work later became focused on the deterioration of glaciers, specifically La Corona, the last glacier in Venezuela, after being introduced to the research of Andrés Yarzábal, a microbiologist at the University of the Andes. Melfo is the leader of a group of scientists who are dedicated to studying the disappearance of ice forms due to climate change.

She has also undertaken fieldwork while researching glaciers, fronting an expedition to the Pico Bolívar glacier. She undertook training in climbing for months before traveling to the glacier, which has since melted completely. This is one of two expeditions from which 600 largely previously unknown microbial strains were recovered to be studied at the university, where they are preserved in deep freezers.

=== Post-retirement ===
Melfo officially retired in 2016 but has continued to work through Venezuela's crisis as other academics, including the majority of her Vida Glacial project team, leave. The remaining scientists face difficulties with their work, primarily with keeping the samples frozen amid blackouts. Though Melfo is disturbed by the disappearance of the glaciers, she knows that with samples collected research can continue for a long time, and also believes that new ecosystems developing on the site of former glaciers will be "beautiful to see". She has also called the disappearance of glaciers a reminder of humanity's responsibility to look after the planet and to attempt to slow down climate change.

She worked with her cousin, the Uruguayan musician Jorge Drexler, to write the song "Despedir a los glaciares", which is included on the 2017 album Salavidas de hielo and is about the disappearance of the glaciers and the problems that cause it. Also in 2017, she was one of the jury deciding the recipients of the Lorenzo Mendoza Fleury Science Prize.

In 2019 Melfo and biology students of the University of the Andes began working with the GLORIA-Andes Project, focusing on the effects of climate change on biodiversity from high-altitude climates. They again face problems being unable to use computers for notes due to a lack of printing ink, and relying on second-hand or donated climbing gear that they store in a CLAP box.

== Personal life ==
Melfo disagrees with the Maduro administration. She wrote a famous 2014 letter to Drexler that was widely published in Uruguay, where she explains her feelings towards the crisis in Venezuela, especially the tupamaros of Mérida, and her reasons for participating in the 2014 Venezuelan protests.

== Publications ==
=== Articles ===
- Gia Dvali; Alejandra Melfo; Goran Senjanović (1995). "Symmetry nonrestoration at high temperature and the monopole problem". Physical Review Letters. 75 (25): 4559–4562. arXiv:hep-ph/9507230. Bibcode:1995PhRvL..75.4559D. doi:10.1103/PhysRevLett.75.4559. PMID 10059940. S2CID 14882371.
- Antonio Ferrera; Alejandra Melfo (1995). "Bubble Collisions and Defect Formation in a Damping Environment". Physical Review D. 53 (12): 6852–6862. arXiv:hep-ph/9512290. doi:10.1103/PhysRevD.53.6852. PMID 10019972. S2CID 18284372.
- Gia Dvali; Alejandra Melfo; Goran Senjanović (1996). "Nonrestoration of spontaneously broken P and CP at high temperature". Physical Review D. 54 (12): 7857–7866. arXiv:hep-ph/9601376. Bibcode:1996PhRvD..54.7857D. doi:10.1103/PhysRevD.54.7857. PMID 10020794. S2CID 15491142.
- Charanjit S. Aulakh; Borut Bajc; Alejandra Melfo; Andrija Rašin; Goran Senjanović (2001). "SO(10) theory of R-parity and neutrino mass". Nuclear Physics B. 597 (1–3): 89–109. arXiv:hep-ph/0004031. Bibcode:2001NuPhB.597...89A. doi:10.1016/S0550-3213(00)00721-5. S2CID 119100803.
- Alejandra Melfo; Goran Senjanović (2003). "Minimal supersymmetric Pati-Salam theory: Determination of physical scales". Physical Review D. 68 (3) 035013. arXiv:hep-ph/0302216. Bibcode:2003PhRvD..68c5013M. doi:10.1103/PhysRevD.68.035013. S2CID 119400537.
- Borut Bajc; Alejandra Melfo; Goran Senjanović; Francesco Vissani (2006). "Fermion mass relations in a supersymmetric SO(10) theory". AIP Conference Proceedings. 805 (1): 152–157. arXiv:hep-ph/0511352. doi:10.1063/1.2149692.
- Cecilia Murrugarra; Alejandra Melfo; Haydn Barros; Luis A. Nuñez; J. Tello; H. Asorey; Cristian Alvarez; Katy Quispe; Xavier Bertou; et al. (2009). "Operating Water Cherenkov Detectors in high altitude sites for the Large Aperture GRB Observatory". arXiv:0906.0814v1 [astro-ph.HE].
- Cecilia Murrugarra; Alejandra Melfo; Haydn Barros; Luis A. Nuñez; J. Tello; H. Asorey; Cristian Alvarez; Katy Quispe; Xavier Bertou; et al. (2009). "The Large Aperture GRB Observatory". arXiv:0906.0816 [astro-ph.HE].
- Cecilia Murrugarra; Alejandra Melfo; Haydn Barros; Luis A. Nuñez; J. Tello; H. Asorey; Cristian Alvarez; Katy Quispe; Xavier Bertou; et al. (2009). "Water Cherenkov Detectors response to a Gamma Ray Burst in the Large Aperture GRB Observatory". arXiv:0906.0820 [astro-ph.HE].
- Alejandra Melfo (2018). "A note on Spontaneous Symmetry Breaking in flocks of birds". arXiv:1702.08067 [physics.bio-ph].
- Ferrer-Paris, José R.; Llambí, Luis D.; Melfo, Alejandra; Keith, David A. (10 September 2024). "First Red List of Ecosystems assessment of a tropical glacier ecosystem to diagnose the pathways towards imminent collapse". Oryx. 58 (6): 735–745. doi:10.1017/s0030605323001771.

=== Books ===
- Luis Daniel Llambí; Alejandra Melfo; Argelia Ferrer; Maximiliano Bezada; Andrés Yarzábal (2017). Alejandra Melfo (ed.). Se van los glaciares: cambio climático en los Andes venezolanos [The glaciers are going: climate change in the Venezuelan Andes] (in Spanish). Caracas, Venezuela: Fundación Empresas Polar. ISBN 978-980-379-374-6.
