= Eko =

Eko, EKO or variations may refer to:

== Arts and entertainment ==
- Eko (film), a 2025 Indian mystery film
- Eko (media production company), an interactive multimedia tech business formed in 2010
- "Èkó" (song), 2019, by Coldplay
- Mr. Eko, a 2005 character from the Lost TV series
- Eko Guitars, an Italian guitar manufacturer founded in 1959
- Eko Software, a French video game developer formed in 1999
- Eko, a character in 2009 video game Arcana Heart 3

== Finance ==
- Eko India Financial Services
- Eko, a currency used in Findhorn Ecovillage, Scotland

== Food and drink ==
- Eko (drink), a coffee substitute in Spain
- EKO, a Dutch organic ecolabel

== People ==
- Ejembi Eko (born 1952), Nigerian jurist
- Eko Fresh (born 1983), German rapper
- Eko Putro Sandjojo, Indonesian minister
- Eko Purjianto (born 1976), Indonesian footballer
- Eko Yuli Irawan (born 1989), Indonesian weightlifter
- Eko Patrio (born 1970), Indonesian comedian
- John O'Connor (born 1949), British musician under his 1990s pseudonym Eko

== Places ==
- Lagos (Yoruba: Èkó), Nigeria
- Elko Regional Airport (IATA:EKO), Nevada, US

== Other uses ==
- Edgeworth–Kuiper object, in the Solar System
- Ekō, a global non-profit (formerly SumOfUs)
- EKOenergy, a renewable energy ecolabel
- Eko Health Inc., an American tech company
- EKO, a Greek petrol station brand of Hellenic Petroleum
- Ekō, formerly SumOfUs, is a global non-profit advocacy organization

== See also ==
- Ekko (disambiguation)
- Eco (disambiguation)
- Echo (disambiguation)
- Ecco (disambiguation)
- Eckō Unltd., a clothing brand
- EKCO, a British electronics company
