= Leonar3Do =

Leonar3Do is an integrated software and hardware platform for creating three-dimensional VR (virtual reality) environments on desktop computers and other devices, allowing creation, manipulation, and analysis of three-dimensional objects in a three-dimensional space. Leonar3Do was invented by Daniel Rátai in Budapest, Hungary. Products and applications based on the Leonar3Do platform are developed and marketed by Leonar3Do International Inc.

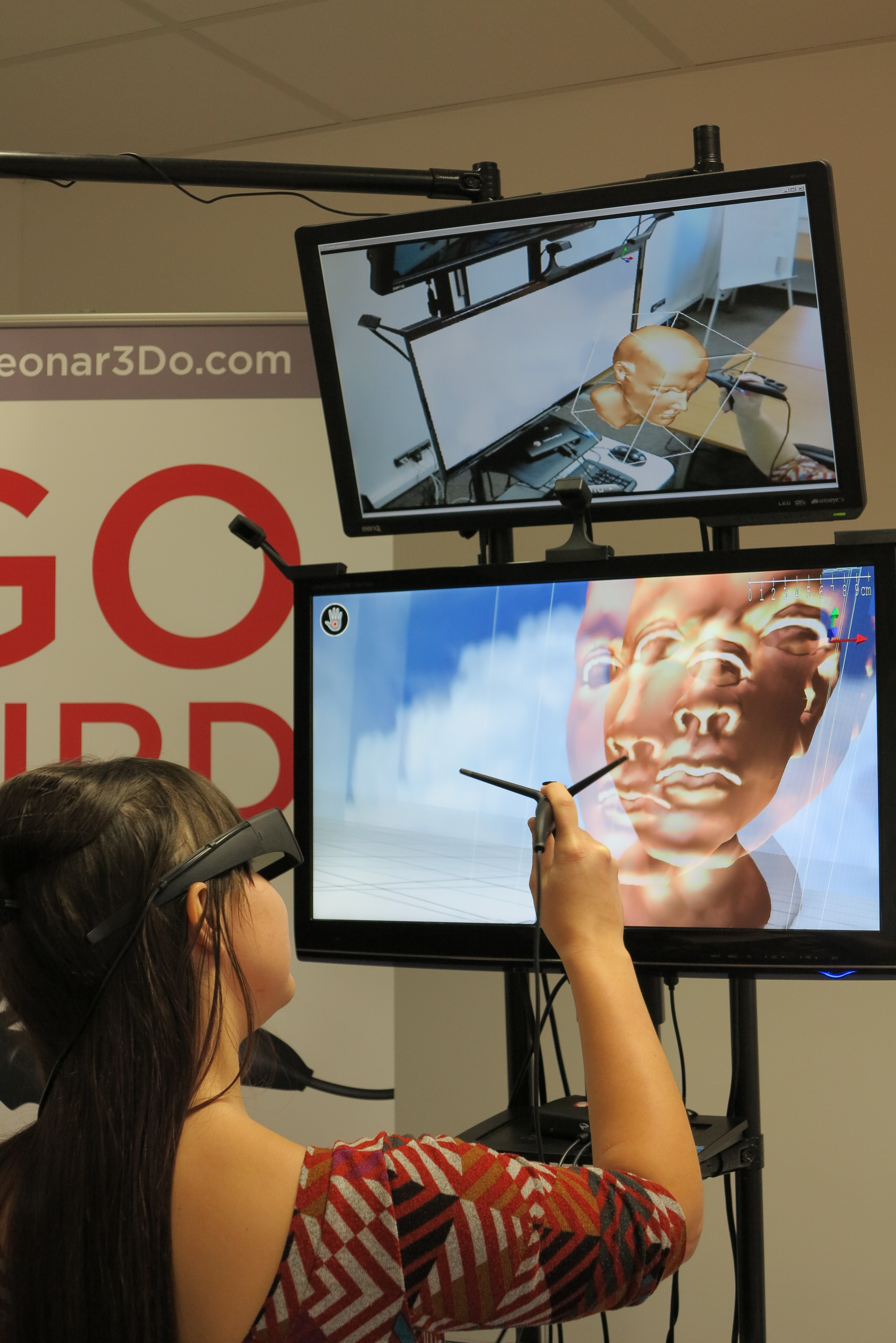
LeoCapture in use

== Technology and structure ==
The Leonar3Do has the following main hardware components:

- The spatial input device, known as the "bird", as a replacement for the traditional mouse. The bird has six degrees of movement, allowing users to grab, move and rotate their 3D model or their space
- Three-dimensional glasses with built-in infra-LEDs for the detection of the eyeglasses’ position
- Three tracking sensors, placed on the top of the display
- Central panel for bi-directional communication

The three sensors' task is to track the position of both the 3D glasses and the input device (bird) and send this information to the central unit. The central unit transmits the received data to the computer and the Leonar3Do system software, which generates, manages, and displays the virtual reality environment produced by the data processed. The result is a complete 3D VR environment, where the user can view the virtual object from any angle. Leonar3Do also has a complete software development kit, which allows the development of new applications based on the Leonar3Do platform. With Leonar3Do's modeling software, users can give physical attributes to virtual objects like changeable mass, gravity, impeccability, and rebounding.

== Products and additional applications ==
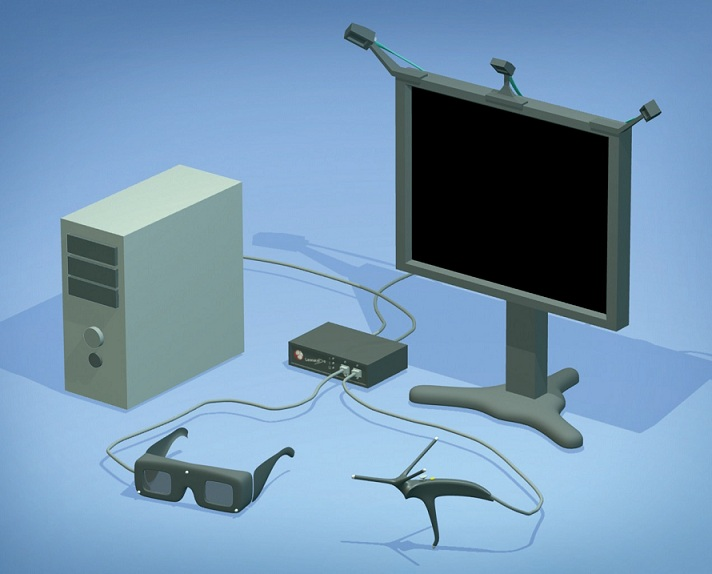
Leonar3Do hardware elements

=== Leonar3Do hardware kit ===
This kit contains the following components:

- central panel
- 3D glasses
- bird (the spatial input device)
- the 3 sensors
- AVC (Analog Video Controller)
- DVC (Digital Video Controller)
- Leonar3Do Software and Operating Instructions DVD

=== Products ===
- Leopoly: Application built on the Leonar3Do platform focusing on online co-creation, sculpting, and 3D model sharing.
- Vimensio: Bundle of Leonar3Do hardware elements and Vimensio educational software built on the Leonar3Do platform, with a main focus on primary, secondary, and higher education. Users can create VR environments, simulations or new 3D VR applications for effective studying.

Vimensio Edit: Gives users the ability to create three-dimensional educational applications without the use of programming languages.
Vimensio Play: A cross-platform application system that allows the presentation of already created three-dimensional content.

=== Software applications ===
Software applications require a 3D monitor and a Leonar3Do Professional Edition Kit or a Vimensio Kit, including the Leonar3Do system software and hardware elements.

- LeoWorld: 3D VR animation and modelling software allowing for real-time polygon optimization, lighting modification, and 3D coloring. The software forms the geometry of the object in real-time as the polygons are rearranged. Users can also give physical attributes to the 3D virtual objects like changeable mass, gravity, impeccability, and rebounding.
- LeoBrush: Airbrush simulation software which allows for the bird to be used as a 3D airbrush.
- Leonar3Do for 3D Designers and Artists: Software bundle containing both LeoWorld and LeoBrush.
- LeoCapture: Application allowing for the 3D VR work process to be captured in 3D and then represented in a flat 2D environment without a 3D camera and 3D player, by creating video clips with a traditional web camera.
- LeoConf Software: Multi-user version of Leonar3Do allowing for 3D demonstrations or presentations to be projected in real time to an audience.
- LeoGomoku: 3D VR version of Tic-tac-toe.
- SDK Software: Application for developing Leonar3Do-based software in a C++ or OpenGL working environment, including the application programming interface, the sample files, the source code, and one year of developer support.
- Autodesk Maya plug-in: Plug-in for the Leonar3Do platform allowing for small changes to be carried out more precisely by manipulating the vertex, polygon, and face surfaces.
- Unity game engine plug-in: Plug-in for the Unity game engine allowing for 3D VR game development.

== History ==
In his childhood, Daniel Rátai was interested in the construction of spatial 3D drawing and became interested in developing the traditional 2D drawing and modelling method. This interest lead to the creation of the first edition of Leonar3Do, which won him the second prize in the National High School Competition in Innovation of 2004.

In 2005, the Hungarian Association for Innovation asked Daniel to represent Hungary at the finals of the Intel International Science and Engineering Fair (Intel ISEF) in May of 2005, where Daniel Rátai and the Leonar3Do project were awarded six first prizes. In the same year, Daniel founded 3D For All Ltd., now Leonar3Do International Inc.

Patronage was taken over the Leonar3Do education project by the Conference of Hungarian Rectors in December 2009, and the development team and company achieved their primary objective of turning Daniel Rátai's invention into a finished 3D VR product in 2010.

In 2011, venture capital was invested in the business by PortfoLion, enabling the company to make further developments and to start the mass-production of the Leonar3Do VR kit.

== Awards ==
- 2005: Daniel Rátai and his Leonar3Do project were awarded with the following six first prizes at the International Science and Engineering Fair:
1. First Place: IEEE Computer Society Award
2. First Place: Computer Science Award—Presented by Intel Foundation
3. First Place: Patent and Trademark Office (PTO) Society Award
4. Best of Category: Computer Science-Presented by Intel Foundation
5. The Intel Foundation Achievement Award
6. Seaborg's SIYSS Award
- 2005: The Tech Award (San Jose, Tech Museum of Innovation) In the category of education, the Leonar3Do project was awarded to be among the five most significant innovations of the world. This Tech Award was the first to be was won by a Hungarian project.
- 2010: The Intelius International Entrepreneurship Award was won by the Leonar3Do team at Kairos Society Global Summit.
- 2012: Leonar3Do was awarded with the "Best of CES" award by Vanquard Marketing at (Consumer Electronics Show).
