= Nano Ganesh =

Type of automated irrigation system

Nano Ganesh is an irrigation automation system that allows farmers to use mobile phones to remotely control irrigation pumps. It is a hardware device that attaches to a starter/water pump set.

== History ==
The development in India of various wireless remote controllers began in 1996^{.} Santosh Ostwal, an electrical engineer founded Ossian Agro Automation in Pune. The application initially supported basic mobile phones and later built-in GSM modules named Nano Ganesh GSM. Approximately 60,000 farmers in India have been using Nano Ganesh since 2008. In mid-2009, it was tested in Anand district in Gujarat in partnership with Tata Teleservices. Later, it was enhanced to operate on any basic mobile phone. In 2014, Ossian further upgraded the technology as Nano Ganesh M2M to monitor the water level of overhead water tanks and remotely control the water pump as per the lower and overflow levels of water in the tanks.

== Usage ==
In some parts of India, farmers have to walk several kilometers to turn on the irrigation pumps that water their fields. With the electrical supply often erratic, they sometimes have no electricity when they reach the pump. Nano Ganesh allows them to remotely check the availability of electricity, and to remotely turn the pump on and off. It helps the farmers to easily access the water pumps avoiding travel over difficult terrain, bad weather, and hazards. It also means growers don't have to wake up in the middle of the night, which is often the time electricity is available, to go to their fields.

== Specifications ==
The application combines a modem with a basic mobile connection and a feature phone that attaches to the starter on the irrigation pump (Latest models do not eliminate the feature phone). Using the mobile phone, the farmer can switch on or off the water pump by text message or dialing assigned code numbers for on and off. It provides acknowledges the status of the power or pump by particular tone signals and texts.

Another version is M2M based in which preset water levels in the overhead tanks are sensed by magnetic float sensors whose signals are passed to the GSM transmitter that sends wireless information on water levels to the mobile phone. This allows the water operator to avoid climbing up the overhead tanks to check water levels. Another Nano Ganesh modem can alert the owner about an attempt to steal the modem, cable, or the pump.

== Recognition ==
- Grand Prize winner in Nokia's Calling All Innovators contest in emerging market category.
- Nominated for the Global Mobile Awards announced by GSMA, London for the best mobile application in the world in Social-Economic category.
- Winner of DST Lockheed-Martin IIGP 2011 program.
- Laureate in the Economic Development category for 2011, by The Tech Awards at the Tech Museum at San Jose, CA, USA.
- One of seven Information and Communication Tools for agriculture and rural development selected y United Nations Food and Agriculture Organization (UNFAO). (2015)
- Demonstrated in the Innovation City in M4D section of Mobile World Congress organized by GSMA at Barcelona, Spain (2017).
- One of fourteen digital initiatives recognized for empowering the low income population by UNESCO-Pearson.
