= Ekos =

Ekos or EKOS may refer to:

- Ekos Research Associates, a Canadian social and economic research company
- Ekos (comic), a comic book published by Aspen Comics
- Ekos, a fictional planet, the setting of "Patterns of Force" (Star Trek: The Original Series)

== See also ==
- Eko (disambiguation)
