= Gaming keypad =

Type of gaming peripheral

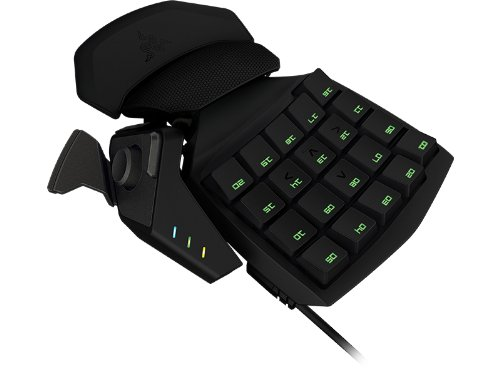
A gaming keypad

A gaming keypad is a small, auxiliary keyboard designed only for gaming. It has a limited number of the original keys from a standard keyboard, and they are arranged in a more ergonomic fashion to facilitate quick and efficient gaming key presses. The commonly used keys for gaming on a computer are the 'W', 'A', 'S', 'D', and the keys close and adjacent to these keys. These keys and style of using a keyboard is referred to as WASD. A gaming keypad will not only optimize the WASD layout, but will often contain extra functionality, such as volume control, the Esc. key, the F1–F12 keys and lighting color options.

== Overview ==
The two primary, and most commonly used, devices for players to use when gaming on a computer are the mouse and the keyboard. While both are integral in the interaction of the game, their evolutionary track has not been equal.

The mouse, over the years, has had better adaptation and incorporation into gaming than the keyboard has. This could easily be attributed to the fact that the mouse is a much more simplified device. The mouse has had many advances to make it a much more adapted device for gaming. It has been upgraded from a rolling ball to an optical sensor, and the optical sensor has been upgraded to a laser. The results of these progressions have allowed players increased sensitivity and accuracy while in a game environment. The mouse has also been equipped with increasingly more buttons. Starting with two buttons, the mouse can now be found with up to seventeen buttons. Buttons have also become programmable, such that the player can perform a greater variety of actions with their mouse.

The keyboard has not seen as much advancement in terms of making it a formidable gaming device. The keyboard is mostly viewed as simply a conglomeration of over a hundred keys that are placed and configured for typing efficiently, not for navigating a character through a virtual world. There have been some modifications made to keyboards to entice a gamer, such as adding macro buttons on the perimeter of the keyboard, or having keys that glow in the dark. Still today the shape and layout of a keyboard remains the same, optimised for word processing but not gaming.

Recently, certain companies have started to introduce mini-keyboards, or sub-keyboards, that are specifically designed to maximize the gaming experience. These are commonly referred to as gaming keypads.

== Benefits of gaming keypads ==
The benefits of having a gaming keypad over a traditional keyboard are many.

- Reduced size - Whether the player is looking to free up desktop space while they are gaming, or are looking for a keyboard that is more conducive to resting in their lap while they sit back, a keypad can give them the option of something much more manageable.
- Ergonomic design – Many of the new keypads have been designed such that they are as comfortable to use as possible while gaming. This reduces the amount of fatigue that the player's hand experiences while playing. It also reduces the possibility of hand injury that could occur from prolonged use of a keyboard.
- More available keys – While most of the keypads do not invent new buttons, they do make more of the already existing buttons more accessible to the fingertips without having to relocate or move the entire hand. Some of them can almost double the amount of buttons that could be normally reached by the hand and fingers.
- Extras – for example; volume control, macro buttons, quick keys, USB ports, or headset ports.

== Game genres ==
The genres of PC games that have been influenced and affected by the development of gaming keypads are first-person shooters (FPS), third-person action-adventure, massively multiplayer online games (MMO), and single-player survival-crafting genre games like Minecraft, Eco and Terraria. In each of these styles of games, there is control over the movement of one character, and this traditionally is done by the WASD keys. Devices also often includes adjacent keys, such as Q and E to lean or rotate (counter-)clockwise, the space bar to jump or fly upwards (and the "Ctrl"/Control key to descend while flying), and the Shift key for sprinting, creating a de facto "standard" for such game's controls that (as of 2025) is only deviated from by development teams with a degree of discretion.

== See also ==
- Computer keyboard
- Game controller
