= Ecco =

Ecco or ECCO may refer to:

== Art and entertainment ==
- Ecco the Dolphin (series), a series of action-adventure science fiction video games
  - Ecco the Dolphin, a 1992 video game
- Ecco (Gotham), a TV series character

== Organizations ==
- ECCO, a Danish shoe manufacturer
- Ecco Press, an imprint of the multinational publisher HarperCollins
- Eighteenth Century Collections Online, a digital library of books published in the British Empire between 1701 and 1800
- ECCO, a cancer summit run by the European Cancer Organisation
- European Confederation of Conservator-Restorers' Organisations, a non-governmental professional organisation
- East Calhoun Community Organization, in Minneapolis, Minnesota

== Other uses ==
- Encyclopedia of Chinese Chess Openings, a classification of all possible openings in Chinese Chess
- Earth Coincidence Control Office, a concept of super intelligent entities described by John C. Lilly
- Ecco Pro, personal information manager software

== See also ==
- "Ecco, ridente in cielo", a cavatina from The Barber of Seville
- Ecco2k (born 1994), a British-Swedish singer and member of the rap group Drain Gang
- EC (disambiguation) for companies named EC (EC Co)
- Echo (disambiguation)
- Eco (disambiguation)
- Eko (disambiguation)
- Ekko (disambiguation)
- Eckō Unltd., a clothing brand
- EKCO, a British electronics company
