= Ekko =

Ekko may refer to:

- Ekko Records, independent record label
- Ekkofestival, Norwegian music festival
- Mikky Ekko, American singer-songwriter
- "Ekko", brand name for medication Phenytoin
- Ekko (League of Legends), the Boy Who Shattered Time, a character in League of Legends

== See also ==
- Echo (disambiguation)
- Ecco (disambiguation)
- Eco (disambiguation)
- Eko (disambiguation)
- Eckō Unltd., a clothing brand
- EKCO, a British electronics company
