= Eco (Jorge Drexler album) =

Studio album by Jorge Drexler
- Released: 2004
- Genre: Latin, pop, electronica, world
- Length: 41:56
- Label: Warner Music
- Producer: Juan Campodónico

Eco is the seventh studio album by Uruguayan singer-songwriter Jorge Drexler, released in 2004 by Warner Music Spain. The album continues the incorporation of acoustic songwriting with electronic elements and features an emphasis on lyrical detail and string arrangements. Eco is frequently cited as a pivotal work in Drexler's career, contributing to his growing recognition in Latin America, Spain, and international markets.

The album was primarily recorded in Uruguay at Sondor Studios and produced by Juan Campodónico, with co-production by Carlos Casacuberta.

Following Drexler's Academy Award win for "Al otro lado del río", a song included in the film The Motorcycle Diaries, the album was reissued as Eco², featuring the Oscar-winning track and an accompanying bonus DVD.

== Track listing ==
All tracks are written by Jorge Drexler (except where noted).

No.	Title	Length
1.	"Eco"
2.	"Deseo"
3.	"Todo Se Transforma"
4.	"Guitarra Y Vos"
5.	"Transporte"
6.	"Milonga Del Moro Judío" (lyrics by J. Drexler- Chicho Sánchez Ferlosio.)
7.	"Polvo De Estrellas"
8.	"Se Va, Se Va, Se Fue" (music by Ben Sidran.)
9.	"Don De Fluir"
10.	"Fusión"
11.	"Salvapantallas"

== Personnel ==
- Jorge Drexler – vocals, acoustic guitar, songwriting, arrangements
- Juan Campodónico - production, guitar, programming
- Carlos Casacuberta - co-production, programming
- Julio Berta - recording and mixing
- Tom Baker - mastering
- Luciano Supervielle- string arrangements, keyboards, scratch
- Martín Ibarburu - drums
- Marcos Suzano - percussion
- Gonzalo Gutierrez - guitar, bass.
- Gabriel Casacuberta - bass
- Edu Lombardo - percussion
- Javier Casalla - violin
- Martin Ferres - bandoneon
- Huma - guitar
- Camerata Punta Del Este - strings
- Ana Laan - Backing vocals
- Pablo Drexler - backing vocals
- Fernando Cabrera - vocals
- Andrés Torrón - guitar
