= Ana Laan =

Spanish singer-songwriter

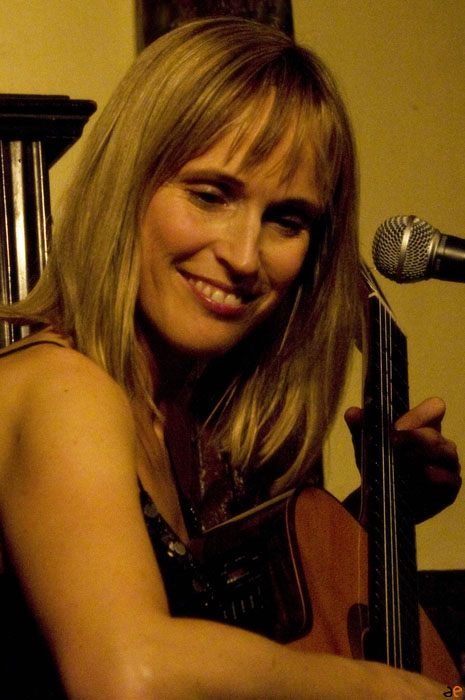
- Ana Laan at Libertad 8

Background information
- Also known as: Rita Calypso
- Born: Ana Serrano van der Laan; February 10, 1967 (age 58); Madrid, Spain
- Origin: Madrid, Spain
- Occupation: Singer-songwriter
- Years active: 2002–present

Ana Serrano van der Laan (born 10 February 1967), known professionally as Ana Laan, is a singer-songwriter born in Madrid, Spain. She composes in English, Spanish and Swedish, with a smattering of French.

== Biography ==
Born in Madrid, Spain, in 1967, she grew up in Stockholm, Sweden, in a trilingual (English, Spanish and Swedish) home. She moved to England during her adolescence and later to Spain, where she studied English philology. She also began her musical career in Spain, taping and performing with a wide variety of Spanish-language artists, among them Javier Álvarez, Sergio Dalma, Jorge Drexler, Diego Vasallo, Christina Rosenvinge and David Broza.

In her first two CDs, she appeared under the pseudonym Rita Calypso for Siesta, an independent label in collaboration with producer Ramón Leal. With Siesta she participated in other projects, among them as part of the pop duo Magic Whispers. Rita developed a certain following in the indie scene after her first CD, "Apocalypso."

"Rita is a femme fatale, with lush pouty lips and dark hair, a man-devourer given to ravishing multimillionaire lovers in the Costa Azul (Mexico). She sings them her versions of songs from the 1960s and 1970s in their yachts. She has a frivolous and glamorous persona," recounts Ana Laan in an interview.

In her first solo CD, Ana Laan recorded her own songs with Juan Campodónico, Luciano Supervielle (Bajofondo Tango Club) and Jorge Drexler (her ex-husband), and coproduced the album with Leo Sidran. The CD was published in the United States in 2004 and in Argentina in 2005, to rave reviews in both countries. The response prompted a series of concerts in New York, Chicago, Minneapolis and Buenos Aires, along with a showcase in the 2005 Latin Alternative Music Conference in New York.

In December 2004 the Chicago Tribune lists her album Oregano among the top 10 best Latin recordings of the year.

Her song "Para el dolor" (For pain), the second track in "Oregano," was included in "Music From the Wine Lands" a compilation by Putumayo World Music, a New York City-based record label. The album also won the Independent Music Award for the best Latin album.

In 2005 she separated from Uruguayan singer Jorge Drexler.

She spent the summer of 2006 in New York recording her second disk, "Chocolate and Roses", also produce with Leo Sidran. Although her Latin roots are still evident in this collection, her compositions include more songs with lyrics in English, a little French, along with several bilingual English-Spanish songs and a Swedish pop song. She is accompanied by Phil Mossman (LCD Soundsystem, U2), Matías Cella (Kevin Johansen, Jorge Drexler), Michael Leonhart (Lenny Kravitz, Steely Dan), Ramón Leal and Javier Álvarez.

This album was presented at the South By Southwest festival in Austin, Texas, in March 2007 and in August she went on a brief tour throughout the United States.

== Musical influences ==
Ana Laan recognizes a variety of influences in her music, among them: Jorge Drexler, Erik Satie, Björk, Rufus Wainwright, Les Luthiers, Camille, Keren Ann, Fiona Apple, Shawn Colvin, Joni Mitchell, Harold Arlen, Kevin Johansen, Aterciopelados, The Beatles, João Gilberto, Caetano Veloso, Gal Costa, Marisa Monte, Gilberto Gil, Paul Simon, Henri Salvador, Maria Albistur, Heitor Villa-Lobos, Bebel Gilberto, Brazilian Girls, Blue Nile, Bulgarian Voices, Radiohead, Portishead, PJ Harvey, Arvo Pärt, Sade, Manzanita, Morcheeba, Nouvelle Vague, Benjamin Biolay, Elvis Costello, Mercedes Sosa, Misa Criolla (Ariel Ramírez), Billie Holiday, Chet Baker, Bill Evans, Blossom Dearie, Emilíana Torrini, Imogen Heap, Marvin Gaye, Bruce Springsteen, Astrud Gilberto, Javier Álvarez, and Fernando Cabrera.

== Discography ==
=== Albums ===
- Apocalypso – 2002 (pseudonym Rita Calypso)
- Sicalyptico – 2004 (pseudonym Rita Calypso)
- Orégano – 2004/5
- Chocolate and Roses – 2007
- Sopa de Almendras – 2011
