= Javier Álvarez (songwriter) =

Spanish songwriter

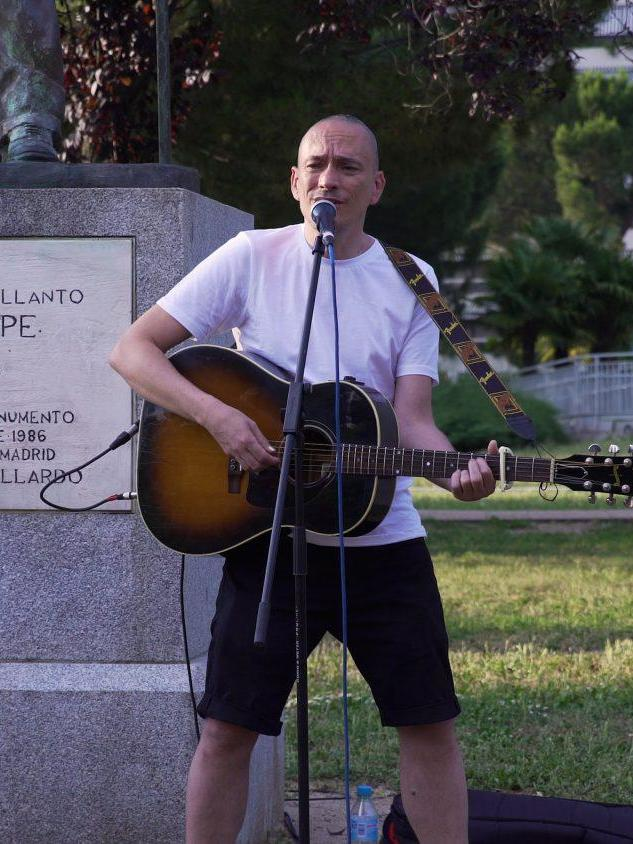
Javier Álvarez (2018).

Javier Álvarez (Cuatro Caminos; Madrid, 7 October 1969) is a Spanish songwriter.

His musical influences come more from pop music than from traditional songwriters. Among his influences are ABBA, Michael Jackson, James Taylor, The Eagles, Tracy Chapman, Nanci Griffith, Suzanne Vega, and Emmylou Harris.

In 1994, he records his first LP with the collaboration of artists such as Ana Belén, Víctor Manuel, Luis Pastor, Pedro Guerra and Rogelio Botanz. Songs such as "La edad del porvenir" or "Uno, dos, tres, cuatro" will bring him fame in Spain. He also recorded a cover of "Las casas de cartón" of the Venezuelan songwriter Alí Primera.

In 1996 Javier Álvarez records his second LP Dos and three years later, in 1999, his LP Tres, where he experiments with electronic and more "radical" lyrics. His theme "Padre" was censored in the main radio stations.

His next album is Grandes éxitos (2001), which is an album of covers of his youth beloved artists. En él Javier Álvarez rescata las canciones de su infancia y les da su toque personal. Among the songs of this album, "Every breath you take" and "With or without you" are notory.

Two years later, he published the album Tiempodespacio, the fifth of his career. In 2005 he published a double LP called Plan Be. His last album, Guerrero Álvarez, is done on poems by Pablo Guerrero, who also recites in this album.

== Discography ==
- Javier Álvarez (1995)
- Dos (1996)
- Tres (1999)
- Grandes éxitos (2001)
- Tiempodespacio (2003)
- Plan Be (2005)
- Banda sonora de El veneno del baile (2008)
- Guerrero Álvarez (2009)

== Collaborations, versions and recompilations ==
- 1996 (DRO) "Mucho Tequila!" – Ya soy mayor (junto a Pedro Guerra).
- 1998 Luis Pastor – "Diario de a bordo" – Por los días que vendrán.
- 1999 "Tatuaje" – ¡Ay! Maricruz.
- 2000 (DRO) Diego Vasallo – "Canciones de amor desafinado" – Coros junto a Nieves Arilla.
- 2000 (DRO) "A tu lado – Homenaje a Enrique Urquijo" – Cambio de planes (junto a Cristina Lliso)
- 2000 (VIRGIN) "¡Mira que eres canalla, Aute!" – Sin tu latido.
- 2002 (DRO) "Patitos feos" – Vamos a contar mentiras.
- 2003 (DRO) "Voy a pasármelo bien. Tributo a Hombres G" – Si no te tengo a ti.
- 2003 (Factoría Author) "Liberando Expresiones, 25 años de Amnistía Internacional" – Amor en vena (junto a Antonio Vega).
- 2004 "El Jueves. Versión imposible II" – Aserejé.
- 2005 (Warner) "Samba pa ti" – Desde o samba é samba.
- 2005 "20 años de la Sala Galileo Galilei" – La edad del porvenir.
- 2007 "Atasco en la Nacional" – Amoureux Solitaires.
- 2007 (Pequod) "Hechos de nubes – Homenaje a Pablo Guerrero" – Te tengo en todo (o en casi todo).
- 2007 (Factoría Author) "La Zarzuela + Pop" – Cuplés babilónicos.
- 2009 (SED) "Cantos de Ghana" – Las chicas son guerreras.
- 2012 Luis Pastor – "Dúos" – Por los días que vendrán.
- 2012 "Las 100 mejores canciones del pop español" – Por qué te vas.
