= Ana Prada =

Uruguayan musician

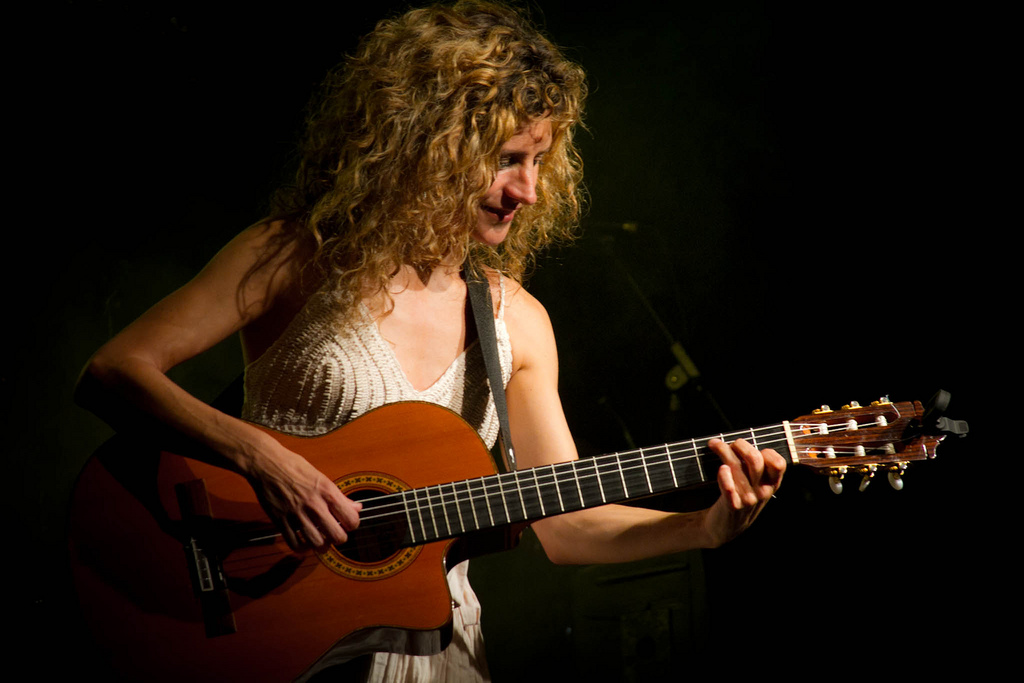

Background information
- Born: Ana Prada; May 1, 1971 (age 55); Montevideo, Uruguay
- Genres: Folk music
- Occupations: singer; songwriter; psychologist
- Website: anaprada.net

Ana Prada (born May 1, 1971) is a Uruguayan singer-songwriter and psychologist.

== Life and career ==
Prada when she left her hometown at 18, started studying music and psychology in Montevideo, Uruguay in 1992. During this time, she practiced and perfected her musical techniques with Esteban Klissich.

Prada is the cousin of Daniel Drexler, who incorporated her into his musical group, "La Caldera," (Spanish for "the boiler") as a vocalist. She had also worked with Rubén Rada, Jorge Drexler (also her cousin), Edú Lombardo, and others.

Prada was nominated for various awards, including the Premios Gardel as a folk artist and in four categories for the Uruguayan Graffiti Award. She taught vocals in the Uruguayan Popular Music Workshop.

As a soloist, she has released the 2006 album Soy Sola (Spanish for "I am alone"), the 2009 album Soy Pecadora (Spanish for "I am a sinner"), and the 2013 album Soy Otra (Spanish for "I am other").

== Style ==
Critics often describe folk and milonga influences in Prada's music, bolstered by urban Uruguayan undertones. The music is also described as simple but powerful. Prada's lyrics often involve solitude, love, and death.
