= Pablo Guerrero =

Spanish singer-songwriter (1946–2025)

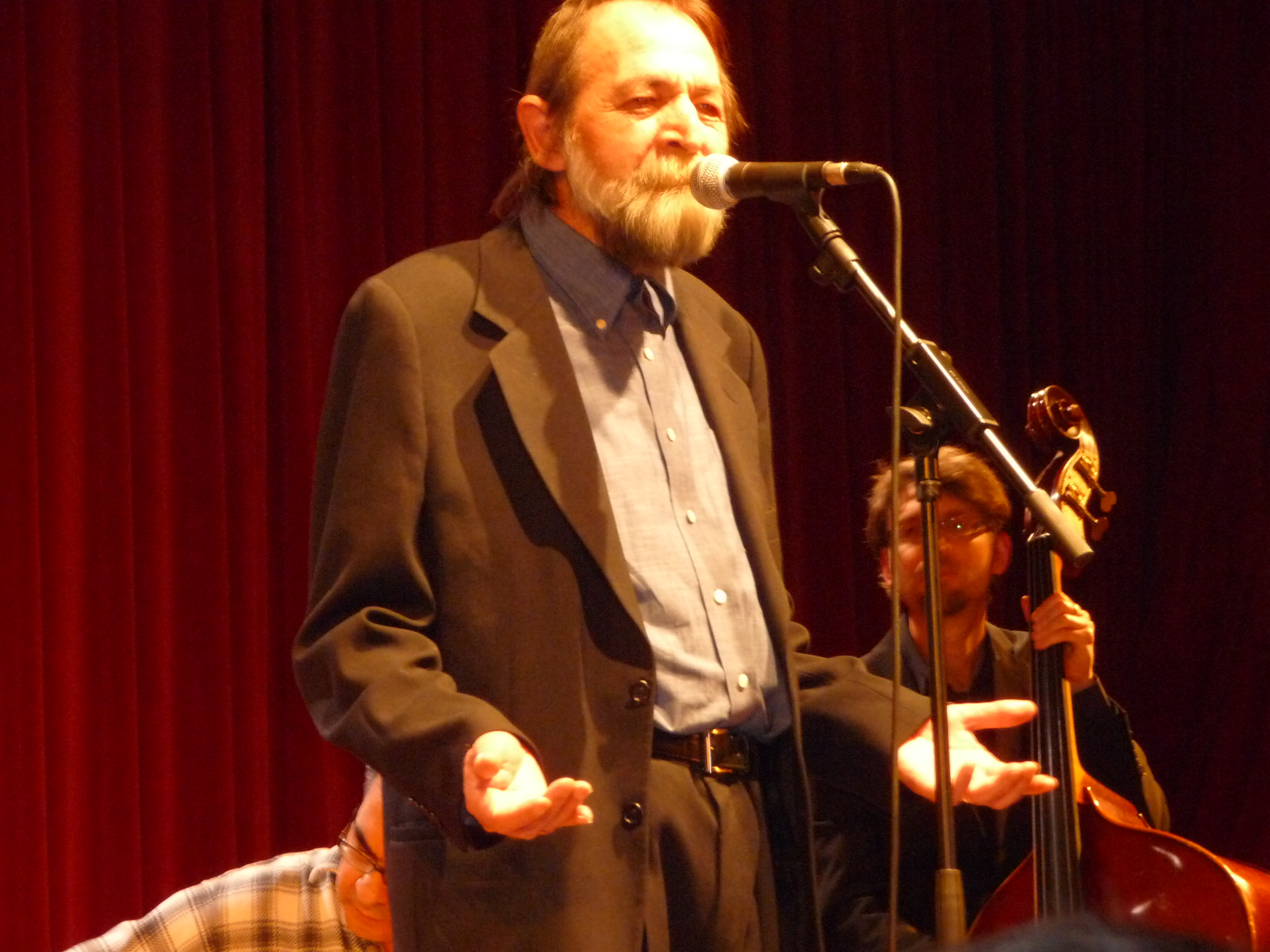
Guerrero performing in Barcelona in 2009

Pablo Guerrero (18 October 1946 – 30 September 2025) was a Spanish singer-songwriter, lyricist, and poet from Extremadura. He lived in Madrid from the late 1960s.

Guerrero used traditional harmonies and melodies from Extremadura, with flamenco, American folk music, rock, and jazz influences. In the mid-1980s he introduced African rhythms and rhythms from other cultures, including avant-garde styles such as minimalism, ambient, electronic, and random music. Guerrero published poetry continuously from 1988 on.

== Background ==
Guerrero was born into a family of small landowners in Esparragosa de Lares, Badajoz, on 18 October 1946. He attended public school, "Virgen de la Cueva", in his village. After finishing high school in Badajoz, he studied teaching in Sigüenza (Guadalajara).

At the age of 16, Guerrero received his first guitar as a gift and began playing music with an amateur group from his school. They performed songs from Los Bravos and Los Brincos. He also played songs by Georges Moustaki, Jorge Cafrune, Joan Baez, Massiel, and the Dynamic Duo.

Guerrero went to Madrid to study liberal arts, specifically literature, while at about the same time, he began to sing, but without any professional intentions, but continued to train as a musician by attending private classes. His poetic interests continued to develop with readings by Pablo Neruda, Blas de Otero, Luis Cernuda, José Ángel Valente and José Agustín Goytisolo during 1969–1978.

Guerrero died in Madrid on 30 September 2025, at the age of 78.

=== Early career ===
In 1969 Guerrero presented himself at the Benidorm Festival with the song Amapolas y Espigas (trans: Poppies and Wheat Spikes [espiga: wheat still on the stalk]). The song won first prize for best lyrics and second prize overall. In his early days as a singer, Guerrero researched Extremadura folklore. After his success in Benidorm, he had to combine his career as a singer with teaching, apart from his studies of Philosophy and Letters (Hispanic Philology and Hispanic Literature).

With help from Manolo Diaz, Guerrero recorded on the Action label his first single, with arrangements by Ramón Farrán. The A-side was Amapolas y Espigas and the B-side was Carro y Camino.

Guerrero's second single, arranged by Carlos Montero, was Son Hombres Que Se Mueren Sin Haber Visto La Mar (Tr: They are Men Who Have Died Without Having Seen the Sea) and Por una calle de Cáceres (A Street in Cáceres). His next had the same musical group and continued the countryside theme in the songs Junto al Guadiana (Next to the Guadiana) and Al Pasar Po'l Arroyo (Passing by the Stream), with lyrics by the poet Luis Chamizo Trigueros. In Guerrero's fourth single, the arrangements of Benito Lauret included a large orchestra and choirs. The orchestrated songs are: Y Los Demás Se Fueron (And the Others Left) and Pequeño Propietario (Small Landowner), which can be considered as Pablo Guerrero's first social protest song.

Guerrero set Miguel Hernández’s poems to music on a record that was to be called Tierra. However, the Francoist Spain regime blocked the recording due to its political nature.

During the cultural scene of the late '60s and early '70s, Guerrero was influenced by Joan Manuel Serrat, Luis Eduardo Aute, Lluís Llach, Raimon, Maria del Mar Bonet, Amália Rodrigues. José Afonso, Georges Moustaki, Jacques Brel, and South Americans Daniel Viglietti and Jorge Cafrune. He also liked the Beatles, the Rolling Stones and the lyrics of Lou Reed.

== La Cantata del Exilio: ¿Cuándo llegaremos a Sevilla? album ==
In 1970 Guerrero collaborated as a singer in the recording of the album La Cantata del Exilio: ¿Cuándo llegaremos a Sevilla? (Tr: Song of the Exile: When Will We Arrive in Seville?) The lyrics were written by Antonio Gómez – a professional journalist and the ideological leader of the group Canción del Pueblo, with music by Antonio Resines. Guerrero sings Dulce Muchacha. The album was not released until 1978, however.

== A Cántaros album ==
In 1972, Guerrero recorded his first LP, A Cántaros. The song of the same name had a quite long subtitle ("Tú y yo, muchacha, estamos hechos de nubes"). A Cántaros was Guerrero's first album with an urban theme.

The guitarist and arranger, Nacho Sáenz de Tejada (ex-member of Nuestro Pequeño Mundo), used Spanish acoustic guitars and electric guitar on two tracks. Juan Alberto Arteche, another member of Nuestro Pequeño Mundo, played percussion, and Guerrero played guitars and percussions. The album was completed with the musicians José González on the organ and piano, José Maria Panizo on bass, Alex Kirschner on flute with Sáenz de Tejada, Quintanilla on violoncello and Carmen Sarabia's choirs.

This album, A Cántaros, shows the influence of American folk musicians: Pete Seeger, Joan Baez, Neil Young, Joni Mitchell, James Taylor, Bob Dylan, and especially Leonard Cohen.

== Pablo Guerrero at the Olympia album ==
On 2 March 1975 Guerrero recorded a live album at the Olympia Theatre in Paris entitled Pablo Guerrero at the Olympia. It was released by Movieplay's Gong label. On it, Guerrero sings and plays the Spanish guitar, accompanied by Nacho Sáenz de Tejada on guitar and Miguel Ángel Chastang on double bass. The album contains previously released songs such as Buscándonos, Hoy Que Te Amo, and the popular A Cántaros. Unreleased songs included Busca La Gente de Mañana, Ecos de Sociedad and Emigrante, along with two acapella songs, a work song called Trilla, and Extremadura. It was one of Pablo Guerrero's best-selling albums during the 1970s.

After Olympia, Guerrero performed in the Ducal Palace in Venice, Italy. He also performed in Germany. Afterward, he toured throughout Spain.

== Porque Amamos El Fuego album ==
In February 1976, Guerrero recorded Porque Amamos El Fuego (Tr: Why We Love The Fire) for Movieplay, produced by Gonzalo García Pelayo. Musically this album incorporates jazz with popular music from Extremadura. It features musicians Nacho Sáenz de Tejada and Jean Pierre Torlois on acoustic and electric guitars, jazz musicians Miguel Ángel Chastang and Antonio Perucho on double-bass and electric bass, and drums and percussion, respectively, and Antonio Pascual on keyboards. Jorge Pardo collaborated with the flute and tenor sax, and Antonio Fernández played the acoustic guitar in No Estés Así (Don’t Be Like That).

Guerrero put the poem "Por Debajo Del Agua" by José Ángel Valente to music. Guerrero also paid tribute to Rafael Alberti in the song Ven Alberti. The musical score in Teo is composed by the singer-songwriters and arrangers Hilario Camacho and P. Guerrero. Even though the characters who populate Guerrero's songs are usually poor and marginal, love, freedom, and hope are present throughout the album. The song Un Rincón De Sol En La Cabeza was dedicated to the Carnation Revolution of April 25, 1975, in Portugal. Guerrero still performed the love song Dulce Muchacha Triste (Sweet Sad Little Girl).

== A Tapar La Calle album ==
In December 1977, Guerrero recorded the studio album A Tapar La Calle for Movieplay, produced by Gonzalo García Pelayo, and released in 1978. The song A Tapar La Calle, which gave the album its name, was originally a popular song from Extremadura. Guerrero transformed into a song about freedom to commemorate the tenth anniversary of the May 1968 protests in France.

A Tapar La Calle is an approach towards flamenco from the popular roots of Extremadura. The guitar arpeggios derive from flamenco, but the harmonies, on the other hand, are of Extremaduran roots. In this totally acoustic album, the flamenco guitarist Miguel de Córdoba exerts a certain influence. The musicians included Nacho Sáenz de Tejada: flamenco guitar y mandolin; Juan Alberto Arteche: bouzouki and mandolin; Miguel Ángel Chastang: contrabass; and Javier Estrella: percussion.

Protest songs on the album include: Paraiso Ahora, A Tapar La Calle and Predicción De La Fiesta. Renewed love is found in Enredado Entre Tu Pelo, Ronda Del Anillo Dentro Del Agua, Una Tarde (lyrics by José Domínguez) and Si Volvieras Otra Vez, and Canción Ritual Que Habla de España, among others.

== Selected discography ==
Es el amor del agua cuando quiere, salvar la sed del hombre, y deshoja su aroma, en los campos blanqueados, por la flor del espino.

Es el amor del agua, la memoria, que hace vivos los cuerpos, que hace vivas las nubes, que hace vivas las selvas.

Translation:

It's the love of water when it wants to slake mans’ thirst and shed her scent in the bleached fields by the hawthorn flower.

It is love of water, the memory that brings life to bodies that brings life to clouds that brings life to jungles.

— Pablo Guerrero, The Love of Water

=== Albums ===
- 1969: "Amapolas y espigas" (Acción)
- 1970: "Por una calle de Cáceres" (Acción)
- 1970: "Junto al Guadiana" (Acción)
- 1971: "Y los demás se fueron" (Acción)
- 1972: A cántaros (Acción)
- 1975: Pablo Guerrero en el Olympia (Fonomusic)
- 1976: Porque amamos el fuego (Fonomusic)
- 1978: A tapar la calle (Fonomusic)
- 1985: Los momentos del agua (Fonomusic)
- 1988: El hombre que vendió el desierto (Grabaciones Accidentales)
- 1992: Toda la vida es ahora (Fonomusic)
- 1995: Alas, alas (BMG Ariola)
- 1999: Los dioses hablan por boca de los vecinos (Música Sin Fin)
- 2000: Sueños sencillos (Resistencia)
- 2005: Plata (Dro)
- 2009: Luz de Tierra (Warner)
- 2013: Lobos sin dueño (Antología personal 40 años de a Cántaros) (Warner)

=== Tributes ===
- 2002: Un barco de sueños poems for children by P. Guerrero, sung by various artists
- 2007: Hechos de nubes – Homenaje a Pablo Guerrero (Universal)
- 2009: Guerrero Álvarez – Javier Álvarez sings lyrics of Pablo Guerrero
