= Cavatina =

Musical term

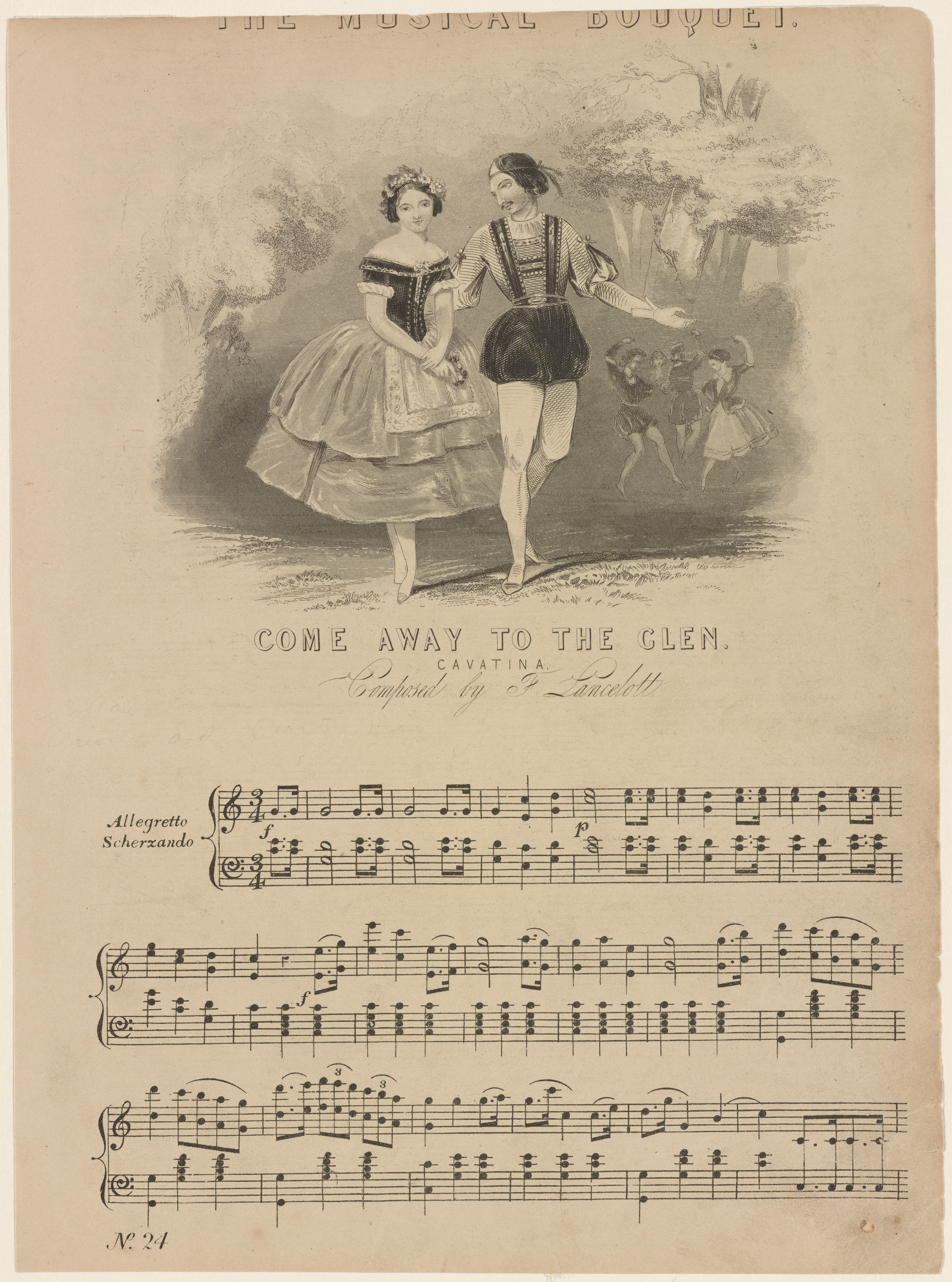
Title page of the cavatina composed by F. Lancelott (1840)

Cavatina (Italian for "little song") is a musical term, originally meaning a short song of simple character, without a second strain or any repetition of the air. It is now frequently applied to any simple, melodious air, as distinguished from brilliant arias or recitatives, many of which are part of a larger movement or scena in oratorio or opera.

"Ecco, ridente in cielo" from Gioachino Rossini's opera The Barber of Seville, "Porgi amor" and "Se vuol ballare" from Mozart's The Marriage of Figaro are well-known cavatinas. A famous piece that bears the name, although without words, is the 5th movement of Beethoven's String Quartet in B-flat major, Opus 130. Ralph Vaughan Williams also gave the title of "Cavatina" to the 3rd movement of his Symphony No. 8. Camille Saint-Saëns wrote a Cavatine for trombone and piano (Op. 144).

In opera, the term has been described as:

a musical form appearing in operas and occasionally in cantatas and instrumental music....In opera the cavatina is an aria, generally of brilliant character, sung in one or two sections without repeats. It developed in the mid-18th century, coincident with the decline of the previously favoured da capo aria (in which the musical form is ABA, with the repeated A section given improvised variations). Examples occur in the operas of Mozart, Weber, and Rossini. In 19th-century bel canto operas of Bellini, Donizetti, and Verdi the term came to refer to a principal singer’s opening aria, whether in one movement or paired with a contrasting cabaletta.

== Derivation ==
In Italian, the word is the diminutive of cavata, the act of producing a sound from a musical instrument (especially string instruments), and by extension, the quality of that sound. For example, one can notice the grace of an expert violinist's cavata or the richness of the cavata from a cello crafted by an exceptionally skilled luthier. From this meaning comes "cavatina," understood as the entrance aria of a character in an opera. The Italian plural is cavatine. In French, it is the cavatine and in German Kavatine.
