= Ecco, ridente in cielo =

"Ecco, ridente in cielo" is a cavatina from Gioachino Rossini's 1816 opera The Barber of Seville, sung by the tenor Count Almaviva, disguised as the poor student Lindoro, at the beginning of act 1.

== Music ==
The aria is an example of the bel canto style. The key signature is C major, but it also modulates into G major and contains chromatic passages. Its vocal range is from F♯_{3} to B_{4}; the tessitura is between G_{3} and G_{4}. The aria is also notable for having a guitar accompaniment.

== Libretto ==
Ecco, ridente in cielo
spunta la bella aurora,
e tu non sorgi ancora
e puoi dormir cosi'?
Sorgi, mia dolce speme,
vieni, bell'idol mio;
rendi men crudo, oh Dio,
lo stral che mi feri'.
Oh sorte! gia' veggo
quel caro sembiante;
quest'anima amante
ottenne pieta'.
Oh istante d'amore!
Oh dolce contento!
Felice momento
che eguale non ha!

Translation:

Here, laughing in heaven
emerges the beautiful dawn,
and you are not awake yet
you can sleep like this?
Arise, my sweet hope,
come, my dear idol;
Render less painful, oh God,
The arrow that wounds me.
Oh destiny! I see now
that dear countenance;
this loving soul
has obtained mercy.
Oh moments of love!
Oh sweet contentedness!
Precious moment
It has no equal!
