= Cavatine (Saint-Saëns) =

Composition for trombone and piano by Camille Saint-Saëns

Cavatine for Trombone and Piano
- Chamber music by Camille Saint-Saëns
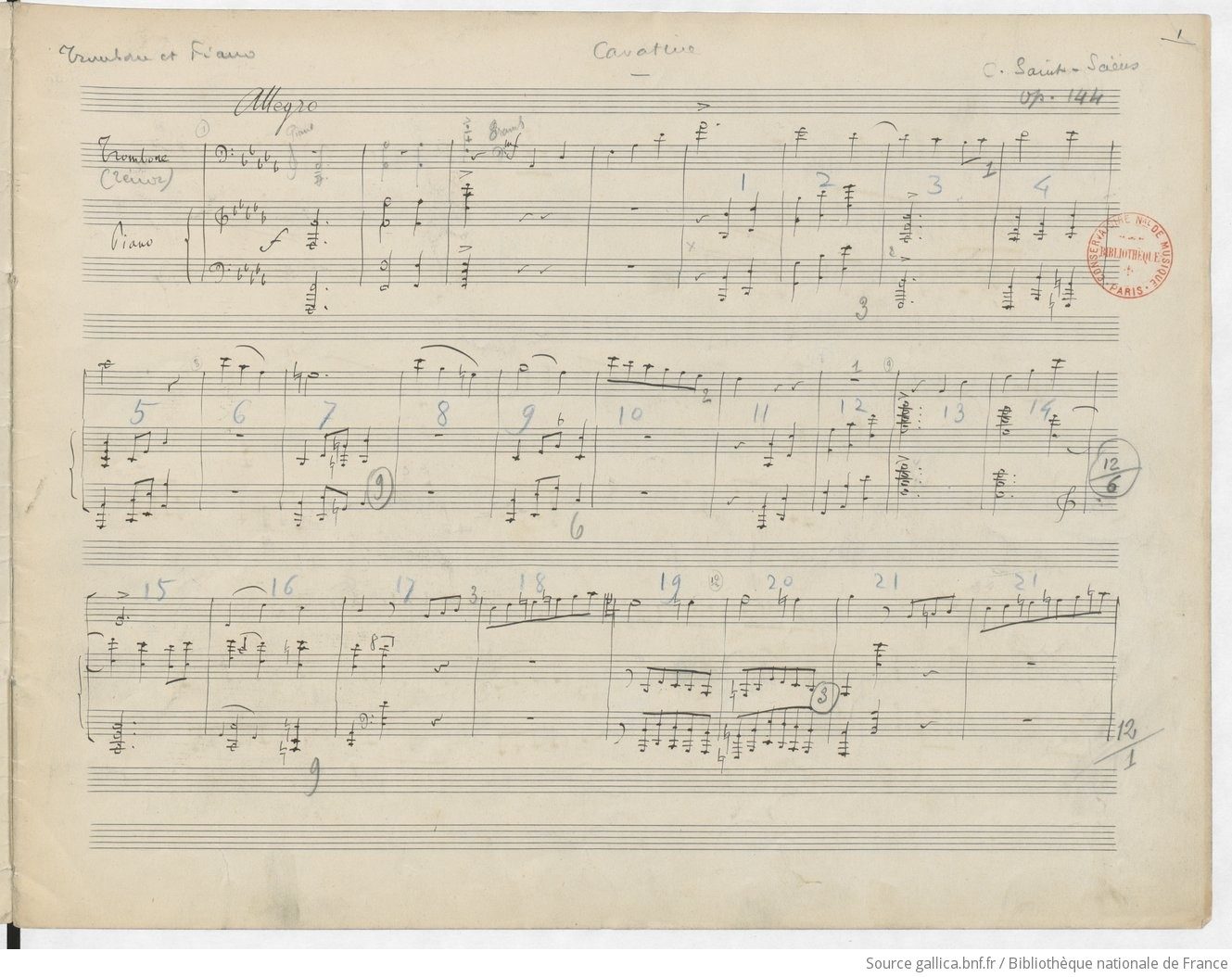
- First page of autograph
- Key: D♭ major
- Opus: 144
- Composed: July–August 1915
- Dedication: George W. Stewart
- Published: October 1915 (Durand)
- Movements: one
- Scoring: trombone; piano

The Cavatine for Trombone and Piano, Op. 144, is a chamber music composition by French composer Camille Saint-Saëns, written in 1915. The piece was dedicated to George W. Stewart, a trombonist and the musical director of the 1915 World's Fair in San Francisco, where Saint-Saëns had participated in several concerts. Composed immediately after Saint-Saëns' return to Paris from the United States, the cavatina showcases the lyrical and vocal qualities of the trombone, despite its technical demands. The work was well received by Stewart and has since become one of the most popular solo pieces in the trombone repertoire.

== History ==
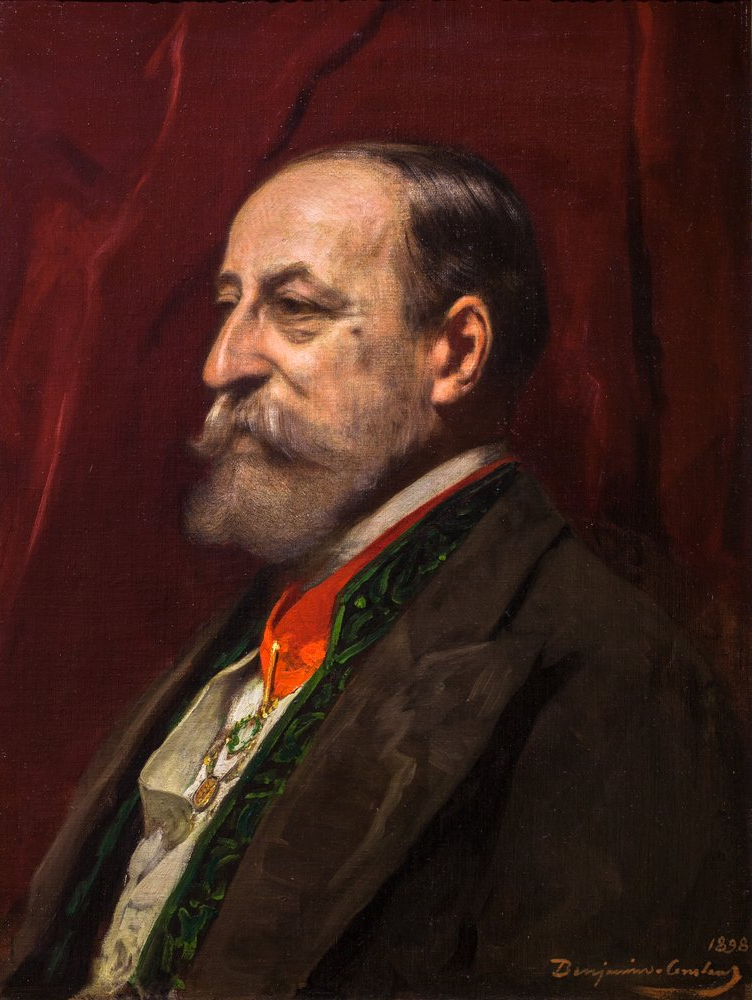
Portrait of Camille Saint-Saëns by Jean-Joseph Benjamin-Constant, 1898

The Cavatine was composed in 1915 in connection with the composer's participation in the World's Fair in San Francisco. Saint-Saëns spent seven weeks at the fair, conducting three concerts devoted exclusively to his own works, including the orchestral piece Hail! California, which was composed specifically for the occasion. The musical events at the World's Fair were organized by George W. Stewart, a trained trombonist and former member of the Boston Symphony Orchestra, who had previously planned the musical presentations of the 1904 World's Fair in St. Louis.

Saint-Saëns' successful journey and good relationship with Stewart likely inspired him to thank the trombonist with a composition for his instrument. After leaving San Francisco on July 9 and sailing back to France from New York on July 17, Saint-Saëns composed the Cavatine immediately upon his return to Paris, completing it by early August. In a letter to Stewart dated 7 August 1915, Saint-Saëns wrote: "In New York, on the ship, in Bordeaux it was not possible for me to write the piece I promised you. But right after I returned home, it was the first thing I worked on. It now has to make the long journey to you. It is at the copyist's, and I hope that you will receive it before the end of the month".

The composer had a copy of the score made and autographed for Stewart before sending it, demonstrating his high regard for the trombonist. Upon receiving the score, Stewart sent a telegram effusively thanking Saint-Saëns: "Delighted beyond measure with Cavatina. It is unquestionably the most beautiful composition ever written for trombone." Saint-Saëns remarked to his publisher with self-irony, "As one knows, it is easy for the one-eyed man to be king in the country of the blind!", referring to the sparse solo literature for trombone at the time.

The autograph score was used as the engraver's copy for the first edition, published by Durand in October 1915. It is unknown if the Cavatine was premiered during Saint-Saëns' lifetime, or if Stewart ever publicly performed the work dedicated to him. However, in 1922, the piece was selected by the Paris Conservatoire as an examination piece for the trombone class in honor of the late composer, with the public examination performance on June 24, 1922, possibly serving as the premiere.

== Structure ==
The Cavatine, titled in reference to a shorter, rather unadorned operatic aria, deliberately evokes vocal music, and is written in D♭ major. Although the opening triadic arpeggios and scales are instrumental in nature, Saint-Saëns emphasizes the lyrical-cantabile aspect throughout the piece, allowing the trombone's vocal qualities to shine.

The work is demanding in terms of range, spanning from A♭_{1} to d♭^{2}, with the latter appearing only once as the final note and a♭^{1} provided as an alternative. While the high register is challenging, it is not unusual compared to the orchestral literature of the time. Saint-Saëns himself regularly wrote for the first and second trombones up to a^{1} and b♭^{1} in his orchestral works, such as Danse macabre and the Organ Symphony, and even demanded a c^{2} from the first trombone in the final movement of his First Symphony.

== Reception ==
When the Cavatine was selected as an examination piece for the trombone class at the Paris Conservatoire in 1922, Parisian music critics were unfamiliar with the work. One reviewer even believed it to be an earlier examination piece, given the technical difficulties and the often very high register of the trombone part. Despite the growth of the solo repertoire for trombone since its composition, the Cavatine has maintained its place among the most popular performance pieces for the instrument. The work "helps the trombone's vocal qualities to come into their own".
