= The Tech Awards =

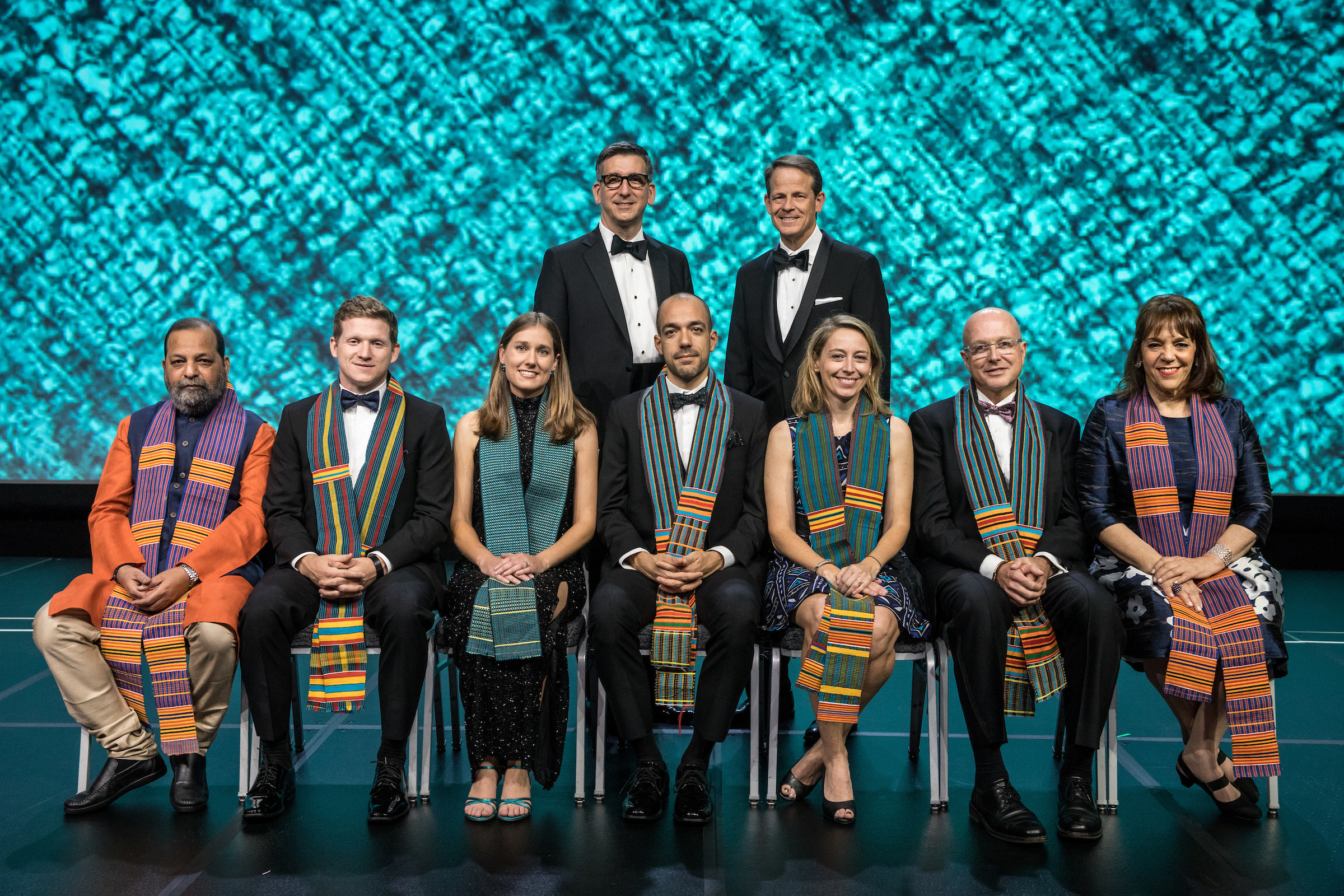
Laureates honored at the 2016 annual Tech Awards.

The Tech Awards (expanded in 2016 to The Tech for Global Good) is a program of The Tech Interactive (previously The Tech Museum of Innovation) wherein innovators from any country are recognized for technological contributions which benefit the greatest number of people.

== History ==
The Tech Interactive created the award in response to The Millennium Project's State of the Future report, which recommends the granting of awards to accelerate technology to improve the human condition.

The Tech has granted the awards yearly since 2001 to multiple recipients in each category, and as of 2011, one recipient in each category also gets a cash award of $50,000 from any of various award sponsors. Awards are granted in five categories - environment, economic development, equality, education, and health.

In 2012, the categories changed to environment, economic development, education, health, young innovator, and Sustainable Energy. The sustainable energy category will not return in 2013. Along with the changes in the categories, the number of laureates changed. Each category would have 2 laureates, one laureate will receive $25,000 and the other laureate would receive $75,000. Therefore, both laureates received a cash prize.

In 2016, the Awards program was a retrospective celebrating the first 15 years, and announced that The Tech Awards would be expanded as The Tech for Global Good, making "the inspirational power of The Tech Awards a year-round presence at The Tech, including special exhibits, educational programs, and "new summits and events that celebrate innovation and inspire young people."

== Global Humanitarian Award ==
The Global Humanitarian Award is given to individuals who displays leadership in using technology to benefit the world.

Year	Global Humanitarian Award recipient
2013	Dean Kamen
2012	N.R. Narayana Murthy
2011	Jeffrey Skoll
2010	Queen Rania of Jordan
2009	Al Gore
2008	Muhammad Yunus
2007	Gordon Moore
2006	Bill Gates
2005	Kristine Pearson
2004	James C. Morgan

== Sponsors ==
The following organizations are currently sponsors of The Tech Awards:

- Applied Materials
- Intel
- Flextronics
- Microsoft
- Nokia
- The Swanson Foundation
- Accenture
- Polycom
- Qatalyst Partners
- KPMG
- Wells Fargo
- Google
- Ernst & Young
- Xilinx

== Prize laureates ==
Award Laureates
year	award	laureate	affiliation	contribution	region	notes
2010	environment	Peer Water Exchange	Blue Planet Network	water sustainability	India	award
2010	Economic Development	Alexis T. Belonio		Gasification system for rice husks	Indonesia, Philippines, Vietnam	award
2010	Education	BBC World Service Trust		Mobile application development to teach English	Bangladesh	award
2010	Equality	A Single Drop for Safe Water		social entrepreneurship for drinking water	Philippines	award
2010	Health	Venkatesh Mannar		promotion of double-fortified salt	India	award
2011	Environment	AquaClara	Cornell University	inexpensive water treatment	Honduras	award
2011	Education	PhET Interactive Simulations		free educational physics and math simulations	United States	award
2011	Equality	Universal Subtitles		A simple, open, and collaborative way to subtitle videos	United States	award
2011	Health	WE CARE Solar		A "solar suitcase" to provide emergency lighting and power for medical procedures	United States	award
2011	Economic Development	Eko India Financial Services		Simple, instant, and safe banking and money-transfer services	India	award
2012	Environment	Arup K. SenGupta		transform arsenic crisis into an economic enterprise while protecting human health	India	award
2012	Education	Literacy Bridge		audio computer playing locally produced lessons that address the practical needs of people in oral cultures	Africa	award
2012	Young Innovator	Angaza Design		Low-cost, embedded Pay-As-You-Go technology that allows customers to pay for energy use in small amounts	Africa	award
2012	Health	BioLite		A low-cost, highly efficient wood-burning stove that dramatically reduces smoke and harmful black carbon emissions	Global	award
2012	Economic Development	Pamela C. Ronald, David Mackill, Kenong Xu	U.C. Davis	Identification of a submergence tolerance gene and precise introduction of the gene into locally adapted varieties favored by farmers using modern molecular breeding	Global	award
2012	Sustainable Energy	Simpa Networks		Simple, affordable, pay-as-you-use pricing and mobile payment for off-grid solar energy solutions	India	award
2013	Environment	Antrix Corp./ISRO: Sujala Project		Watershed development	India	award
2013	Education	Enova		Created educational learning centers in areas determined by data	Mexico	award
2013	Young Innovator	TOHL		Mobile piping infrastructure for post disaster areas	Chile	award
2013	Health	Nazava Water Filters		Easy-to-use household water filters	Indonesia	award
2013	Economic Development	The Darfur Stoves Project		An energy-saving metal cookstove adapted for local cooking traditions, and assembled from flat-kits that are easily stockpiled and deployed.	Sudan	award
