= Global Observation Research Initiative in Alpine Environments =

Scientific survey operation

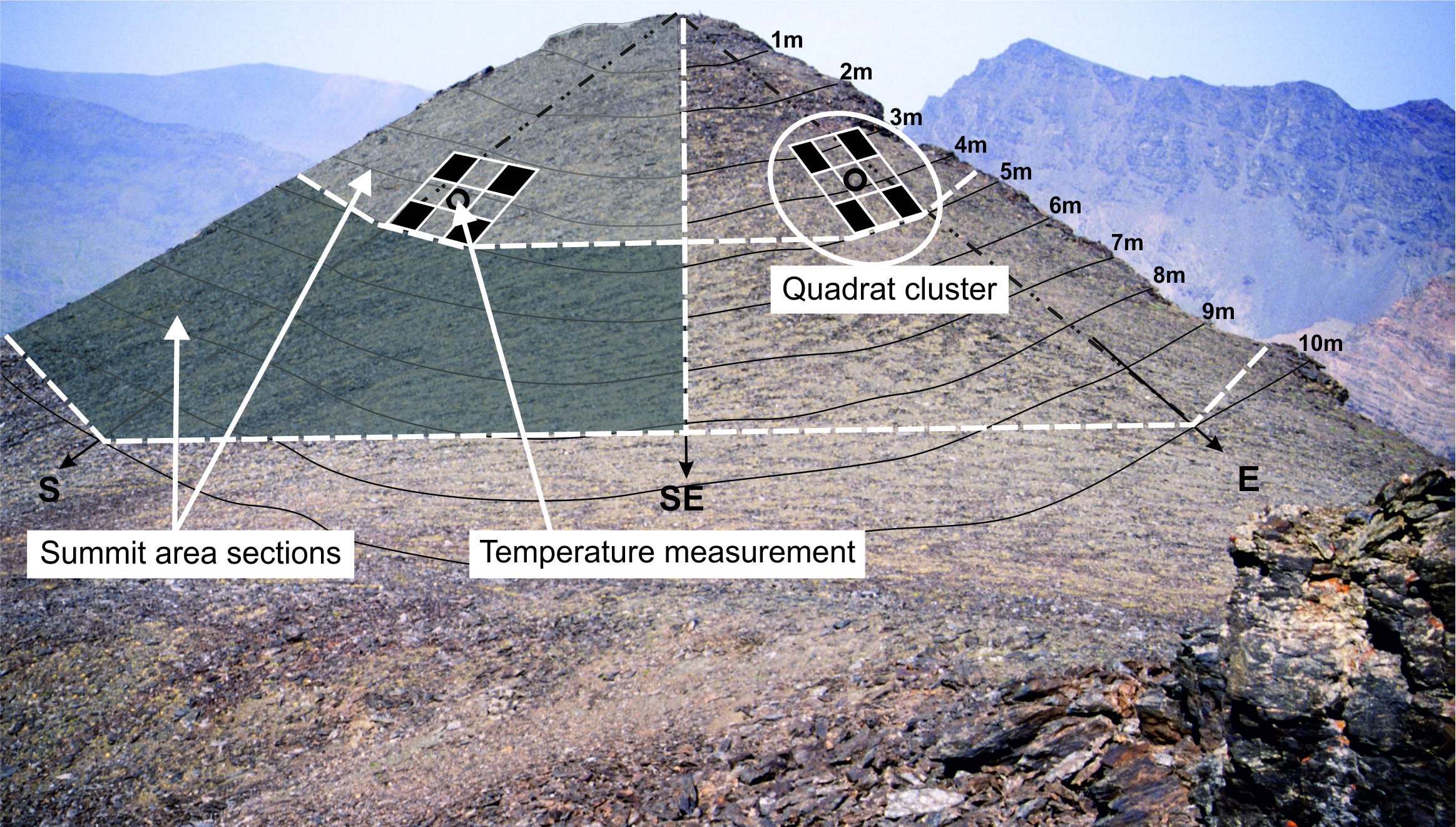
sampling design of the GLORIA Multi-Summit Approach

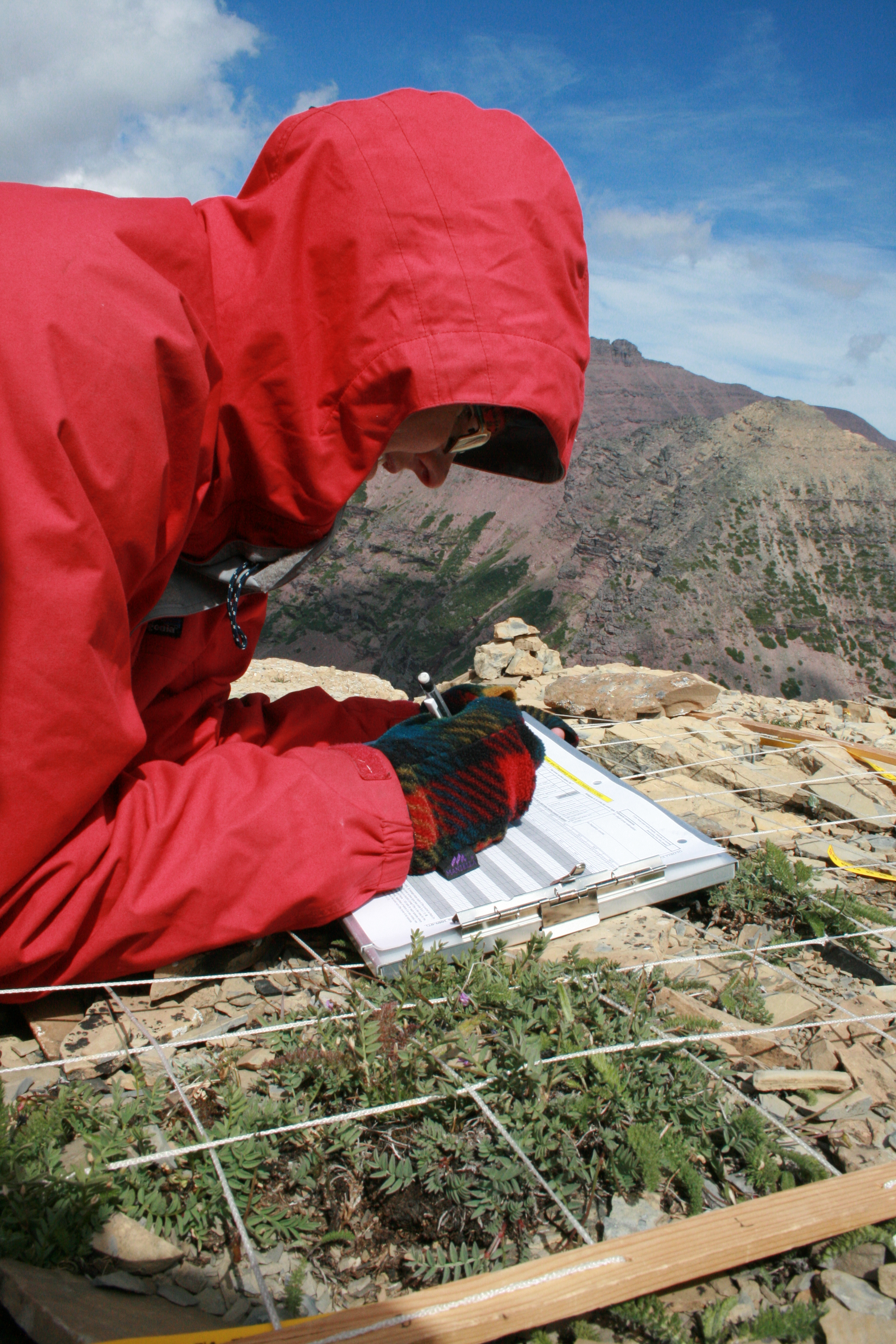
Vegetation survey taken in Glacier National Park (U.S.) for GLORIA.

The Global Observation Research Initiative in Alpine Environments (GLORIA) established an international long-term monitoring program and site-based network dealing with high-mountain vegetation and its biological diversity. Its purpose is the in-situ observation and comparative assessment of alpine biodiversity patterns under the impact of accelerating anthropogenic climate change. GLORIA involves sets of permanent plots established at pristine or near-natural sites set aside and monitored to observe the migration of plant species due to climate change. Founded in 2001, the program has grown to more than 120 sites (status January 2016) around the world, distributed from the poles to the tropics."

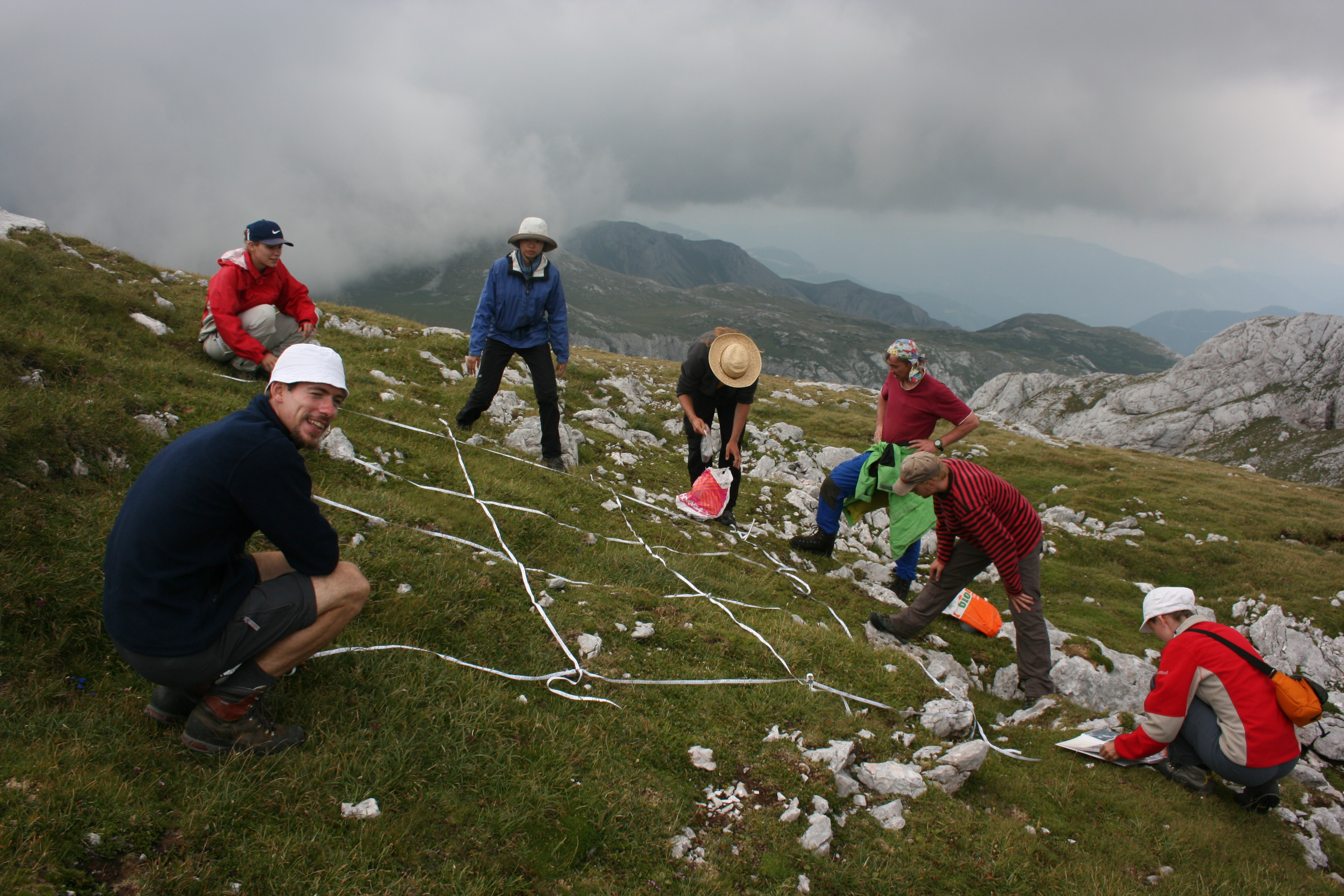
GLORIA field campaign on Hochschwab

== History ==
The idea to monitor alpine plant communities in the context of anthropogenic climate and global change was first discussed in 1996 during a workshop of the International Geosphere-Biosphere Programme in Kathmandu. In consequence, the GLORIA monitoring approach was initiated by the Austrian ecologists Georg Grabherr, Michael Gottfried and Harald Pauli at the turn of the century, by running experiments in alpine habitats to determine what a good sample method might be. In 2001, GLORIA-Europe was launched. This major pilot project, with 18 sites in 13 different European nations, was a way to test out the idea before going worldwide. Since the spring of 2004, GLORIA has been successively expanding into other regions and across all major climate zones of the world.

== Methods and structure ==
Comparability, simplicity and economy were the main considerations in designing GLORIA's standard recording design and method (Multi-Summit Approach), in order to build a world-wide network of operable sites. In each study region (target region) a suite of four monitoring locations in summit areas at different altitudes represents an elevation gradient from the treeline ecotone to the upper limits of plant life. At each location, vascular plant species and abundances are to be recorded in standardized permanent plots of different size at intervals of 5 to 10 years, along with continuous measurements of soil temperature. Several supplementary approaches, e.g., focusing on other organism groups, soil ecology or on socio-ecological features, are applied or are under development in some study regions. The network consists of dedicated ecologists and biologists from over hundred research institutions and many protected area authorities, distributed over six continents and it cooperates with other international efforts such as the Global Mountain Biodiversity Assessment of the Future Earth programme and the LTSER network. GLORIA's head office and central data base is affiliated to at the Austrian Academy of Sciences (Institute for Interdisciplinary Mountain Research) and the University of Natural Resources and Life Sciences Vienna (Center for Global Change and Sustainability), Austria.

== Recent findings ==
On a pan-European scale, repeated surveys showed widespread thermophilisation of alpine vegetation, i.e., species compositions changed towards a larger percentage of thermophilous species at a concurrent decline of cold-adapted high-elevation species. Across Europe, species predominantly were shifting to higher elevations during the past decade. In central and northern Europe, this led to increasing species numbers in the permanent plots, whereas in Mediterranean mountains, species numbers were stagnating or declining, probably owing to combined effects of increasing temperatures and decreasing precipitation. Recent declines of high elevation specialist species, however, were also observed in the European Alps. Comparisons with results from other continents are not yet available on a larger scale, because permanent sites were established at a later date.

== See also ==
- Effects of global warming
- Alpine plant
- Alpine climate
