= Eko Health Inc. =

American medical technology company

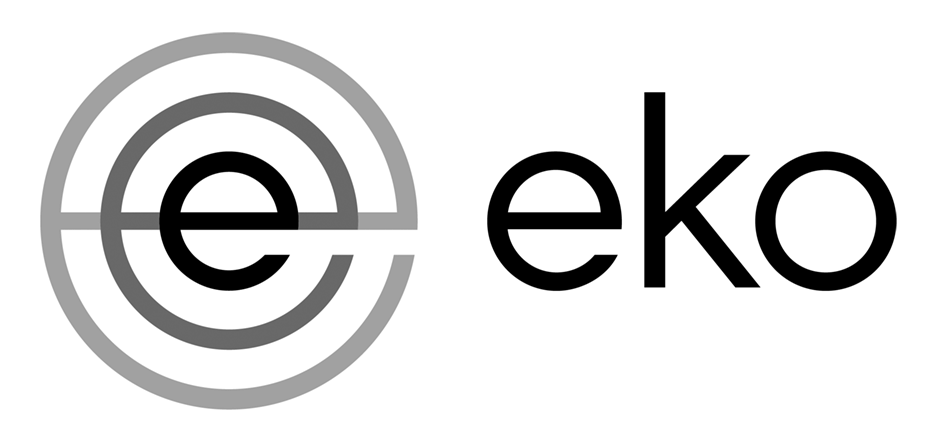
- Type: Private
- Industry: Health technology
- Founded: 2013
- Founders: Connor Landgraf, Jason Bellet, Tyler Crouch
- Headquarters: Emeryville, California, U.S.
- Number of employees: 153
- Website: www.ekohealth.com

Eko Health Inc. is an American healthcare technology company that develops digital stethoscopes and artificial intelligence (AI) software for the detection of cardiovascular and pulmonary disease. The company was founded in 2013 at the University of California, Berkeley by Connor Landgraf, Jason Bellet, and Tyler Crouch. Its devices and algorithms have received multiple U.S. Food and Drug Administration (FDA) clearances and have been evaluated in journals including The Lancet Digital Health, Nature Medicine, and the Journal of the American Heart Association (JAHA).

== History ==
=== Founding and early development (2013–2017) ===
- 2013 – Founded at the University of California, Berkeley by Connor Landgraf, Jason Bellet, and Tyler Crouch.
- 2015 – Received FDA 510(k) clearance for the Eko Electronic Stethoscope System (CORE™ Digital Attachment) (K151319). The device was also included on TIME magazine's Best Inventions list.
- 2017 – Received FDA 510(k) clearance for the Eko DUO™ ECG + Digital Stethoscope (digital stethoscope with single-lead ECG) (K170874).

=== AI research and growth (2018–2022) ===
- 2018 – The FDA granted Breakthrough Device designation to Eko’s low ejection fraction algorithm developed with Mayo Clinic.
- 2020 – Received FDA clearance for AI software to detect atrial fibrillation and heart murmurs (K192004).
- 2020 – Entered into collaboration with 3M™ Littmann® to co-develop a digital stethoscope line.
- 2022 – The Lancet Digital Health published results showing that an ECG-enabled digital stethoscope with AI could identify patients with reduced ejection fraction in UK primary care.

=== Product expansion and global deployment (2023–present) ===
- 2023 – Received FDA 510(k) clearances for the CORE 500® digital stethoscope family (K230111; later variant K233609).
- 2023 – Journal of the American Heart Association published findings that a deep-learning murmur detection algorithm matched or exceeded expert performance on structural heart disease cases.
- 2023 – Research presented at the American Heart Association Scientific Sessions and published as an abstract in Circulation reported that AI-enabled digital stethoscope screening in primary care more than doubled sensitivity for detecting valvular heart disease compared with standard auscultation.
- 2023 – Partnered with Astellas Pharma to incorporate the CORE 500® Digital Stethoscope into Z1608, a solution under development for heart failure patients built on Welldoc's digital therapeutic platform.
- 2023 – Partnered with healthcare apparel company FIGS to launch the FIGS | Eko CORE 500® Digital Stethoscope, which combined Eko’s FDA-cleared CORE 500® technology with FIGS’ design elements.
- 2024 – Nature Medicine published results of a randomized trial in Nigeria showing that AI-guided screening in pregnancy more than doubled detection of left-ventricular systolic dysfunction compared with usual care.
- 2024–2025 – The American Medical Association issued a Category III CPT code for Eko’s SENSORA® platform in 2024, and the Centers for Medicare & Medicaid Services subsequently assigned an OPPS payment in 2025.
- 2025 – JACC: Advances published a large cohort validation showing that combining single-lead ECG and heart-sound data from a digital stethoscope enabled automated detection of reduced ejection fraction (≤40%).
- 2025 – Formed a strategic collaboration with Boehringer Ingelheim to develop a canine-specific AI detection algorithm for the early diagnosis of heart murmurs in dogs.
- 2025 – Included in TIME magazine’s list of the World’s Top HealthTech Companies, highlighting performance and innovation in intelligent stethoscopes and AI platforms.
- 2025 – Jerome Adams, former U.S. Surgeon General, joined Eko as a Distinguished Medical Advisor to provide guidance on clinical implementation, product development, and public health partnerships.
- 2025 – Imperial College London and Imperial College Healthcare NHS Trust reported higher diagnosis rates of heart failure, atrial fibrillation, and valve disease within a 15-second exam using Eko’s AI stethoscope; results were covered in The Guardian and by the British Heart Foundation.

== Products ==
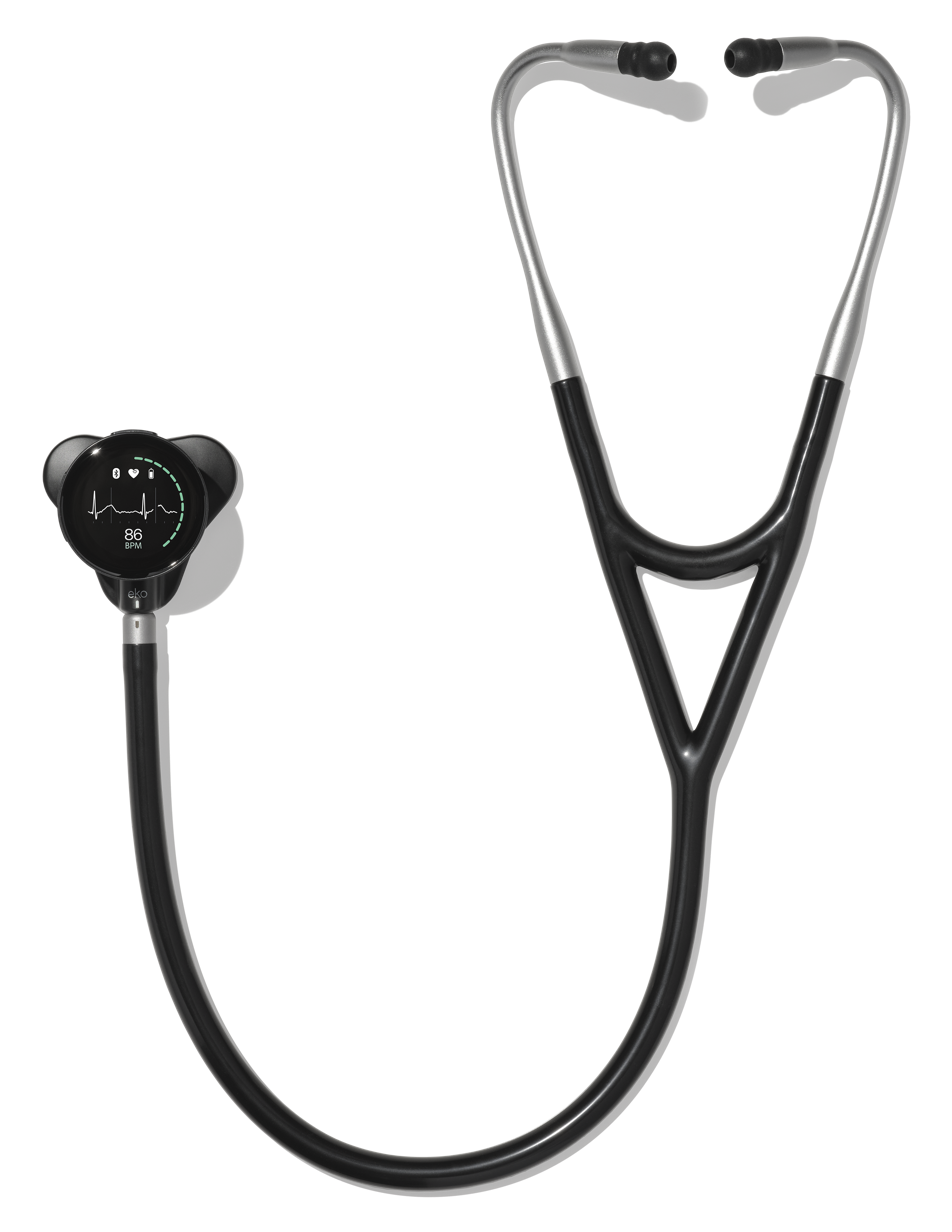
Eko CORE 500™ Digital Stethoscope

- CORE™ (2015) – Digital stethoscope attachment; FDA 510(k) K151319.
- DUO™ ECG + Digital Stethoscope (2017) – Digital stethoscope with single-lead ECG; FDA 510(k) K170874.
- 3M™ Littmann® CORE (2020) – Co-branded digital stethoscope using Eko’s digital platform.
- CORE 500® (2023) – Digital stethoscope with onboard display and ECG; FDA 510(k) K230111 and variant K233609.
- SENSORA® – AI software platform for murmur, atrial fibrillation, and reduced ejection fraction detection; received CPT Category III status in 2024 and CMS OPPS payment in 2025.

== Research and clinical validation ==
- Nature Medicine (2024): A randomized trial in pregnant women found that AI-guided stethoscope screening more than doubled detection of left-ventricular systolic dysfunction compared with usual care.
- The Lancet Digital Health (2022): A prospective UK study showed that an ECG-enabled digital stethoscope paired with an AI algorithm could screen for reduced ejection fraction in general practice settings.
- Journal of the American Heart Association (2023): A deep-learning murmur detection algorithm matched or exceeded clinician accuracy in diagnosing structural heart disease from auscultation recordings.
- Circulation (2023, abstract, AHA Scientific Sessions): Research presented at the American Heart Association Scientific Sessions and published as an abstract in Circulation reported that AI-enabled digital stethoscope screening in primary care more than doubled sensitivity for detecting valvular heart disease compared with standard auscultation.
- Telemedicine and e-Health (2025): A randomized controlled trial at a National Cancer Institute–designated cancer center found that remote pre-anesthesia evaluations using an Eko Duo stethoscope achieved high concordance with in-person exams, reduced visit time and costs, and showed environmental benefits without compromising safety.
- JACC: Advances (2025): A large cohort validation demonstrated that combining single-lead ECG and heart-sound data from a digital stethoscope enabled automated detection of reduced ejection fraction (≤40%), supporting its use as an early screening tool.

== Funding ==
- 2018 – Raised $5 million in Series A funding led by ARTIS Ventures.
- 2019 – Raised $20 million in Series B funding, led by ARTIS Ventures.
- 2020 – Raised $65 million in Series C funding led by Highland Capital Partners and Questa Capital.
- 2022 – Raised $30 million as an extension of its Series C round.
- 2024 – Raised $41 million in Series D financing with participation from ARTIS Ventures, Highland Capital Partners, NTTVC, and Questa Capital.
