= Eko Bharat Ventures Private Limited =

Indian financial technology company

- Formerly: Eko India Financial Services Private Limited
- Type: Private
- Industry: Financial technology
- Founded: September 17, 2007; 18 years ago
- Founders: Abhishek Sinha; Abhinav Sinha; Sanjay Bhargava; Manoranjan Kumar
- Headquarters: New Delhi, India
- Area served: India
- Key people: Abhishek Sinha (Co-founder,Director); Abhinav Sinha (Co-founder,Director); Sriram Natarajan (Director)
- Products: Domestic money transfer, Aadhaar Enabled Payment System (AePS), Bharat Bill Payment System (BBPS), bank account/PAN verification, merchant lending, merchant financial services, application programming interfaces
- Revenue: ₹34.4 crore (US$3.6 million) (FY2025)
- Website: about.eko.in

Eko Bharat Ventures Private Limited, formerly known as Eko India Financial Services Private Limited, is an Indian financial technology company that provides digital payment, business correspondent, merchant network, and API-based financial services. The company was incorporated on 17 September 2007 by brothers Abhishek Sinha and Abhinav Sinha, and began as a branchless banking initiative providing financial access through neighbourhood retail outlets. It has also been involved in the distribution of micro-insurance products in collaboration with Bharti AXA Life Insurance Company.

== History ==
Based on the recommendations of the Khan Commission, the Reserve Bank of India introduced the concept of "business correspondents" in its 2005-2006 policy year to expand financial inclusion in the Indian banking sector. At the time, co-founder Abhishek Sinha, a graduate of BIT Mesra, was working with Mahindra Satyam on a mobile commerce application for a foreign company. Inspired partly by the M-Pesa mobile-money model in Kenya and comparable programmes in Brazil and the Philippines, Abhishek Sinha and his brother Abhinav Sinha founded Eko in September 2007, along with Sanjay Bhargava and Manoranjan Kumar, with initial capital of approximately ₹95 lakh (US$99,000) contributed by family and friends, according to the company; a 2010 YourStory report described the amount as approximately ₹2.05 crore (US$210,000). The company offered peer-to-peer money transfer, cash deposit and withdrawal, wage payments, micro-insurance, and micro-credit services through small neighbourhood shops acting as banking agents. Bhargava left Eko in 2008 and Kumar in 2009. A planned tie-up with Centurion Bank of Punjab in 2008 fell through after that bank merged with HDFC Bank.

In November 2008, Bill Gates visited Eko's mobile banking pilot in Uttam Nagar, New Delhi, and met with chief executive Abhishek Sinha. In March 2009, Eko received grant funding of ₹8.6 crore (US$890,000) from CGAP's Technology Program, housed within the World Bank and co-funded by the Bill & Melinda Gates Foundation. With that support, Eko launched an SBI Mini Savings Bank Account product at Uttam Nagar on 23 February 2009, appointed by State Bank of India as its business correspondent for the product. The Times of India reported that Eko's customer base grew from about 6,000 accounts at the end of 2009 to more than 40,000 by April 2010.

In June 2011, Business Today profiled the company in a cover story on affordable banking access for underserved customers. The following month, Eko raised ₹30 crore (US$3.1 million) from Creation Investments and other investors, according to the company; contemporaneous press coverage described the amount as approximately ₹25.7 crore (US$2.7 million). VCCircle reported that the company had distribution partnerships with State Bank of India and ICICI Bank, enabling customers to open SBI Mini Savings Accounts and ICICI Apna Savings Accounts, and to access Bharti AXA Bachat Bima micro-insurance policies.

In April 2012, Eko was appointed by Yes Bank as a business correspondent to provide domestic money transfer services, going live that June. By January 2016, Eko reported managing approximately ₹200 crore (US$21 million) among 1.1 million clients, serving about 180,000 users through a network of some 700 customer service points concentrated in Delhi NCR and parts of Bihar and Jharkhand.

In 2017, Eko raised a further ₹10 crore (US$1.0 million) from Creation Investments, according to the company; press coverage described the amount as approximately ₹9.8 crore (US$1.0 million). The same year, the Reserve Bank of India imposed a monetary penalty of ₹500,000 (US$5,200) on the company under Section 30 of the Payment and Settlement Systems Act, 2007, for non-adherence to RBI instructions and inaccurate reporting, following a show-cause notice and the company's written submission.

Eko obtained a Prepaid Payment Instrument (PPI) licence from the Reserve Bank of India in 2015, and in 2016 monetised its technology assets by opening its platform to independent entrepreneurs in the domestic money transfer business, a shift later described by IIM Ahmedabad's venture research group as the company's pivot from direct service provision to platform enablement. According to a December 2020 case study by CGAP (Consultative Group to Assist the Poor), Eko launched Eko Platform Services (EPS) in 2015 and grew its agent network tenfold within three years, from 15,000 to 150,000 agents, expanding coverage from ten states to all 36 Indian states and union territories; the platform reportedly generated four times more revenue and a 350 percent increase in transaction volume compared with Eko's traditional agent-acquisition model. In December 2021, the India Brand Equity Foundation reported that Eko had grown 30% month-on-month over the preceding seven months following a shift to fully digital operations during the COVID-19 pandemic, with revenue having grown twelvefold over the prior four years.

In 2021, Eko announced its entry into lending for small sellers and merchants. According to the company, Eko raised ₹30 crore (US$3.1 million) from EXXORA, the family office of Sriram Natarajan, in 2022, as part of a larger funding round intended for product development and expansion of its merchant network; Natarajan subsequently joined Eko's board of directors, per Ministry of Corporate Affairs records. Press coverage (Preqin, fintech.global) dated the round to 2023, reporting approximately ₹29.7 crore (US$3.1 million).

== Products and services ==
Eko provides financial technology services through a combination of business correspondent channels, a merchant network, a white-label platform, and application programming interfaces (APIs).

Its services include domestic money transfer, Aadhaar Enabled Payment System (AePS) transactions, Bharat Bill Payment System (BBPS) collection, recharge, cash collection, bank account verification, and PAN verification. The company's developer platform, marketed as Eko Platform Services, provides APIs enabling partners to process transactions through IMPS and NEFT, verify bank account details, perform biometric-based cash-out transactions through AePS, support third-party lending organisations, and verify PAN details for know-your-customer purposes.

According to the company, Eko also operates Eloka, a white-label business-to-business platform used by other businesses and agent networks, offering domestic money transfer, AePS, BBPS, cash management, QR payments, Indo-Nepal money transfer, credit card bill payment, lending, and insurance services.

According to the company, Eko operates several additional brands and platforms, including Connect, a platform used by retail partners to offer cash-based and assisted-commerce services; Eko Kiosk, a retail banking offering run through State Bank of India's kiosk banking channel; Eko Global, a division focused on enterprise clients; and Eko University, a training platform for its retail partners. The company also offers merchant lending through a partnership model; Indifi Technologies, an SME lending platform backed by banks and non-banking financial companies, lists Eko among its distribution partners. Eko's verification API suite extends beyond bank and PAN checks to include GST, driving licence, passport, voter ID, DigiLocker, vehicle registration, and UPI ID verification.

According to the company, Eko has served more than 50 million customers, works with a merchant network of about 150,000, processes more than 7 million transactions a month, and provides APIs used by more than 300 partners.

== Business correspondent and merchant network ==
Eko's original model used local retail outlets as customer service points to provide banking and payment services to underserved customers, with bank partnerships allowing customers to access account opening, remittance, and micro-insurance products through these outlets. In its early years, Eko's network was concentrated in Delhi NCR and select districts of Bihar and Jharkhand. The company continues to describe its merchant network as a channel for financial access for customers with limited access to conventional bank branches. In 2022, Eko worked with MicroSave Consulting to redesign incentive structures for its business-correspondent agents, aiming to make agent compensation more transparent and consistent.

== Regulatory action ==
In March 2017, the Reserve Bank of India imposed a penalty of ₹500,000 (US$5,200) on Eko India Financial Services Private Limited under Section 30 of the Payment and Settlement Systems Act, 2007, citing non-adherence to RBI instructions and wrongful reporting.

== Funding ==
- March 2009 — ₹8.6 crore (US$890,000) grant funding from CGAP's Technology Program (World Bank), co-funded by the Bill & Melinda Gates Foundation.
- July 2011 — ₹30 crore (US$3.1 million) from Creation Investments and other investors, according to the company (press coverage at the time reported ₹25.7 crore (US$2.7 million)).
- 2017 — ₹10 crore (US$1.0 million) from Creation Investments, according to the company (press coverage reported ₹9.8 crore (US$1.0 million)).
- 2022 — ₹30 crore (US$3.1 million) from EXXORA, the family office of Sriram Natarajan, according to the company (Preqin and fintech.global reported this round in 2023 at approximately ₹29.7 crore (US$3.1 million)).
- Cumulative — approximately ₹70 crore (US$7.3 million) across six funding rounds, per aggregator data.

== See also ==
- Branchless banking
- Aadhaar Enabled Payment System
- Spice Money
