= Eco (2018 video game) =

2018 simulation video game

- Developer: Strange Loop Games
- Publisher: Strange Loop Games
- Director: John Krajewski
- Producer: William Seccombe
- Designer: John Krajewski
- Artist: Milenko Tunjic
- Engine: Unity
- Platforms: Microsoft Windows; Mac; Linux
- Release: February 6, 2018 (early access)
- Genres: Simulation; Open-world
- Mode: multiplayer

Eco is a simulation game created by American studio Strange Loop Games, in which players have to work together to create a civilization on a virtual planet. The game values a gentle use of natural resources and is used both as an entertainment and educational tool.

== Gameplay ==
Eco is a multiplayer survival game that allows players to interact with both the world and each other. The game pushes players to reenact a sustainable lifestyle. Players have to care about a balanced nutrition and need to control the gathering of natural resources, otherwise negatively harming or destroying the environment. For example, cutting too many trees reduces the amount of air pollution that can be mitigated, and creating too much pollution by using high tech machines can raise the sea level and species of plants or animals can become extinct if players harvest or hunt too much of them. In order to prevent this from happening players have to create a working society. They have the possibility to create currencies and establish an economy for trading, form a government and propose and vote on laws that can restrict what other players can do or give incentives to (not) do things by applying taxes or government grants to specific actions. Unlike other survival games, Eco does not have any combat between players or monsters, and there is no way for the player's character to die. It also encourages players to actively collaborate and work together with other players.

== Plot ==
The game world in Eco is threatened with an impending meteor impact. The task of the players is to research and improve the level of technology available to them in order to destroy the Asteroid before it strikes without harming the game world too much by resource exploitation or pollution. The game world shares similarities to Earth. It is a small planet consisting of dirt, stone, and several other underground resources. It also features different biomes like forests, plains, and rivers, as well as several kinds of plants to harvest and animals to hunt.

== Development ==
Eco was originally an educational tool designed purely for middle school students. Strange Loop Games cooperated with the University of Illinois on the creation of the game for some time. The U.S. Department of Education allocated more than a million dollars for the development of the project, with its biggest boost delivered in 2015 of almost US$900,000 for a two-year development contract. Strange Loop Games had previously produced two games: the logic game Vessel and the serious game Sim Cell.

The design of the game has been influenced by open-world games like Minecraft and Rust, and has taken inspiration from the dynamic community processes present in EVE Online.

In August 2015, the CEO of Strange Loop Games and designer of Eco, John Krajewski, attempted to raise $100,000 using the crowdfunding platform Kickstarter, in order to further extend the game. The campaign was successful, raising more than $200,000. A release date of September 2015 was targeted. It was eventually released in February 2018 as early access, in order to fund the ongoing development.

== Reception ==
In 2018, Rock, Paper, Shotgun described the game as a "pretty Minecraft", and emphasized that survival games usually promote a heedless exploitation of resources, while the players actions in Eco has consequences that need to be thought of. In 2021, Massively Overpowered was charmed by the game and curious to watch it develop. In 2023, German website Buffed.de opined that the game is better suited to cooperative multiplayer players.
