= Latin Grammy Award for Best Tropical Song =

Music award category

- Awarded for: quality tropical music songs
- Country: United States
- Presented by: The Latin Recording Academy
- First award: 2000
- Currently held by: Edgar Barrera, Andres Jael Correa Rios & Karol G for "Si Antes Te Hubiera Conocido" (2025)

The Latin Grammy Award for Best Tropical Song is an honor presented annually at the Latin Grammy Awards, a ceremony that recognizes excellence and creates a wider awareness of cultural diversity and contributions of Latin recording artists in the United States and internationally. The award is reserved to the songwriters of a new song containing at least 51% of the lyrics in Spanish. Instrumental recordings or cover songs are not eligible. Songs in Portuguese may be entered in the Brazilian field.

The award was first presented to Juan Luis Guerra for the song "El Niágara en Bicicleta" at the 1st Latin Grammy Awards held in 2000. He is also the most awarded performer in this category, winning on every occasion he's been nominated, a total of five times. His song "La Llave de mi Corazón" also won the award for Song of the Year in 2007, becoming the first tropical song to do so. Apart from Guerra other multiple winners include Sergio George and Jorge Villamizar, both with two wins.

Colombian songwriters have won this award a total of seven times, more than any other nationality. It has been won by songwriters from the Dominican Republic six times, the United States three times and Puerto Rico once.

== Winners and nominees ==
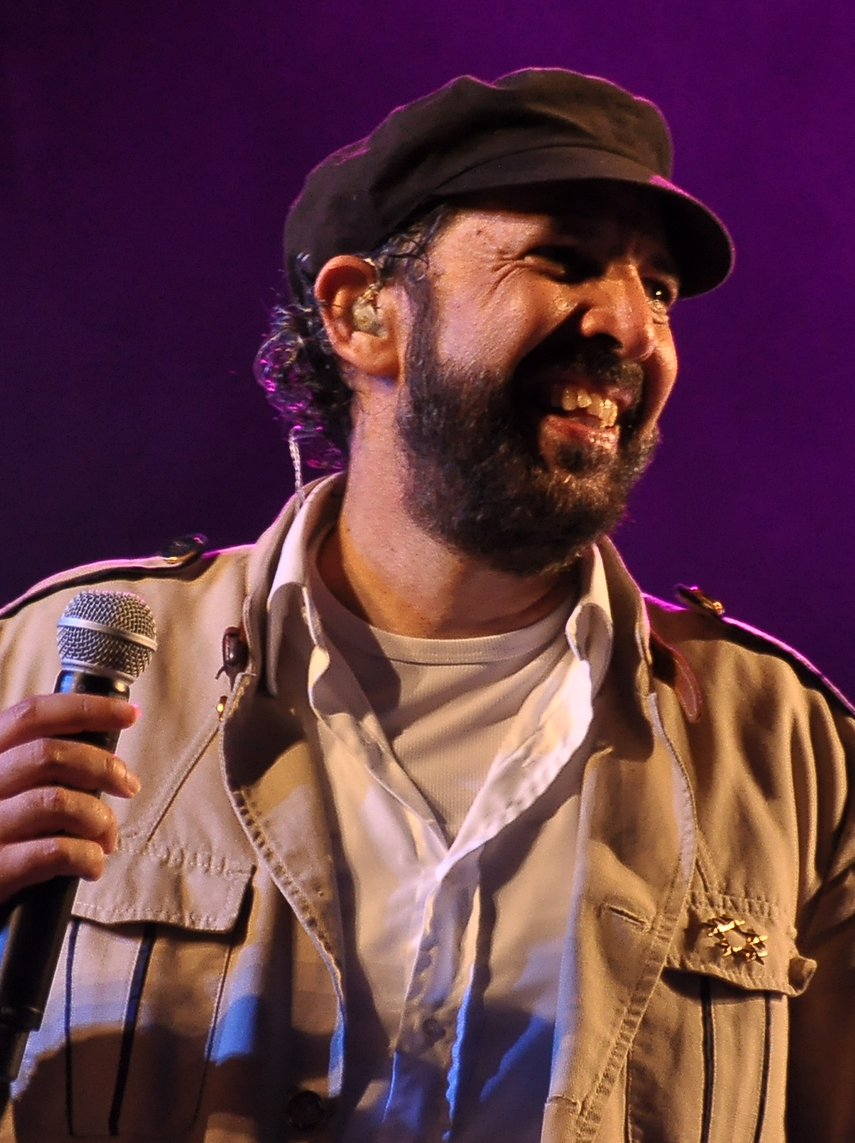
Eight-time winner Juan Luis Guerra.

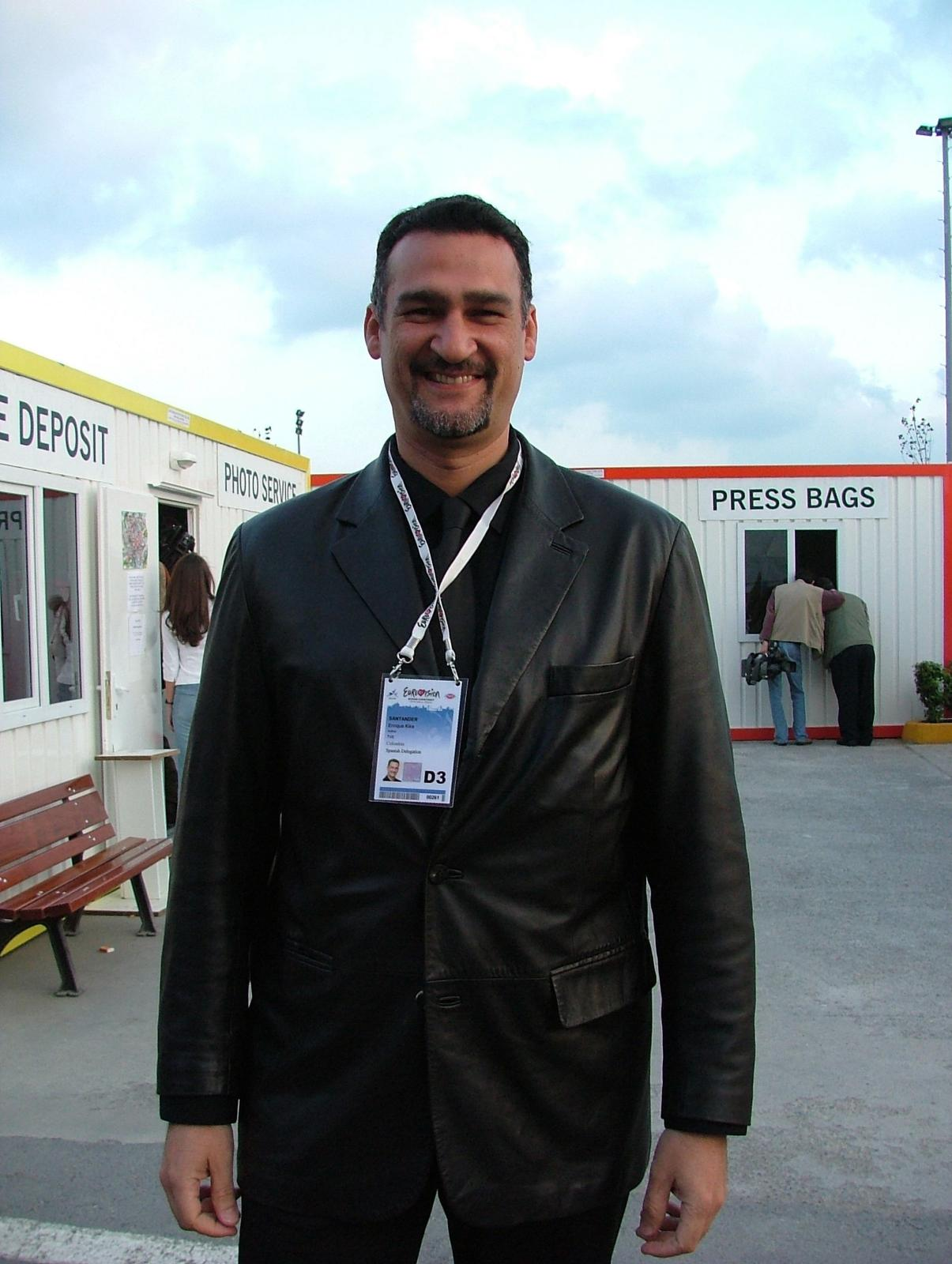
2001 winner Kike Santander.

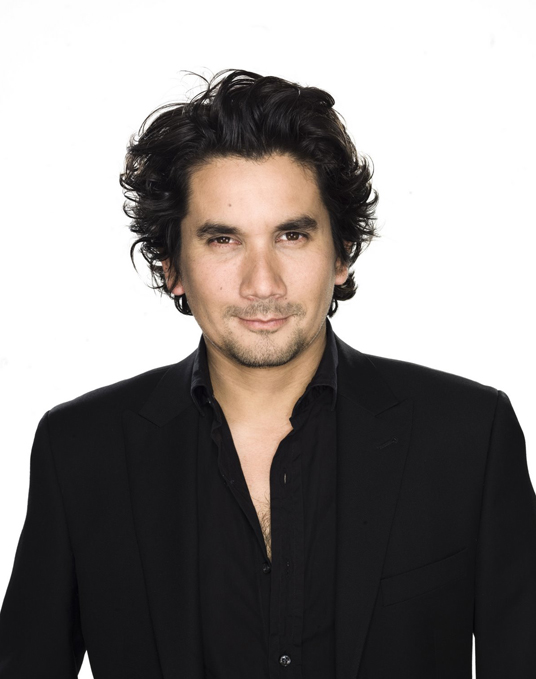
Two-time winner Jorge Villamizar.

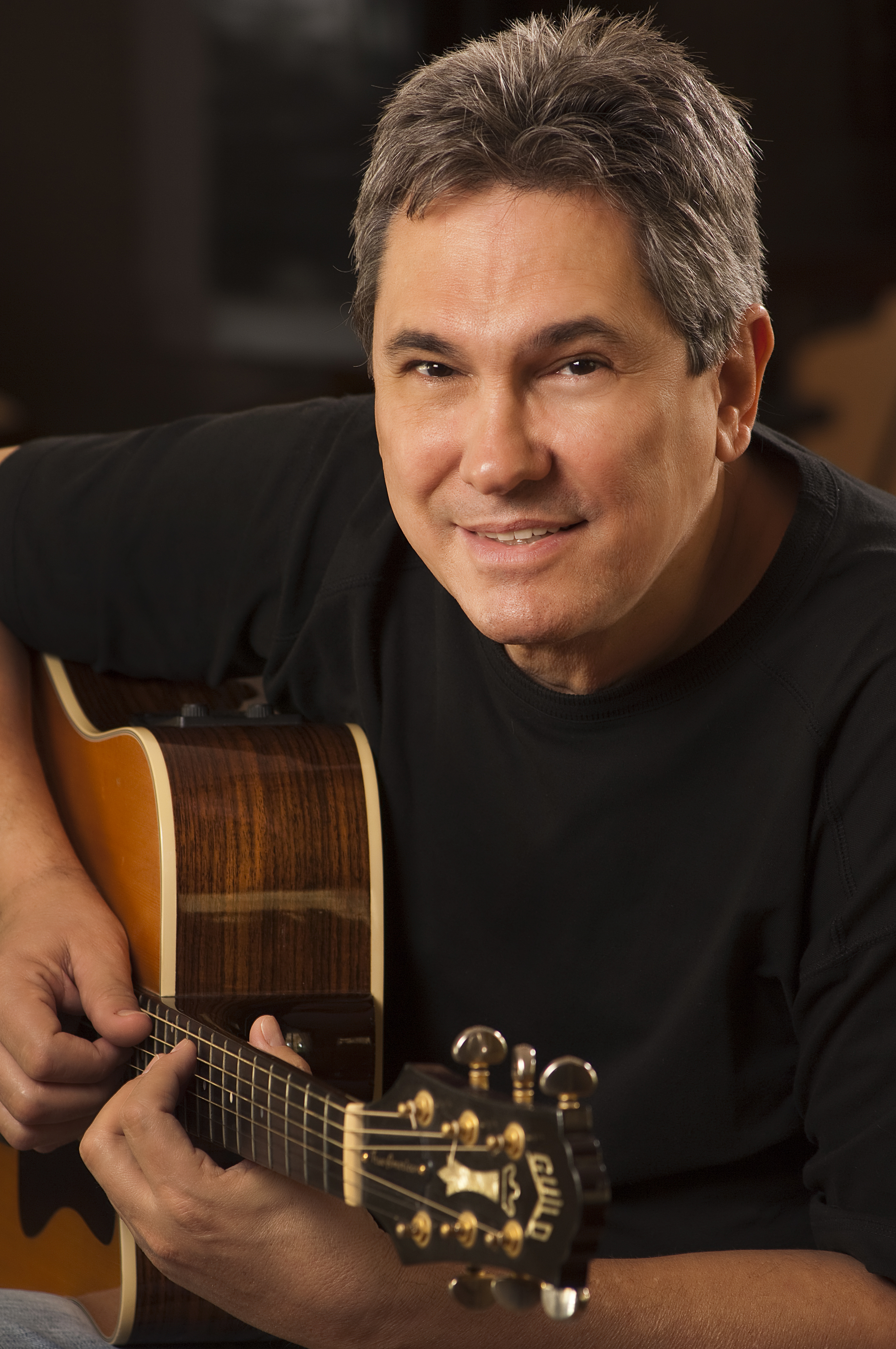
2009 winner Jorge Luis Piloto.

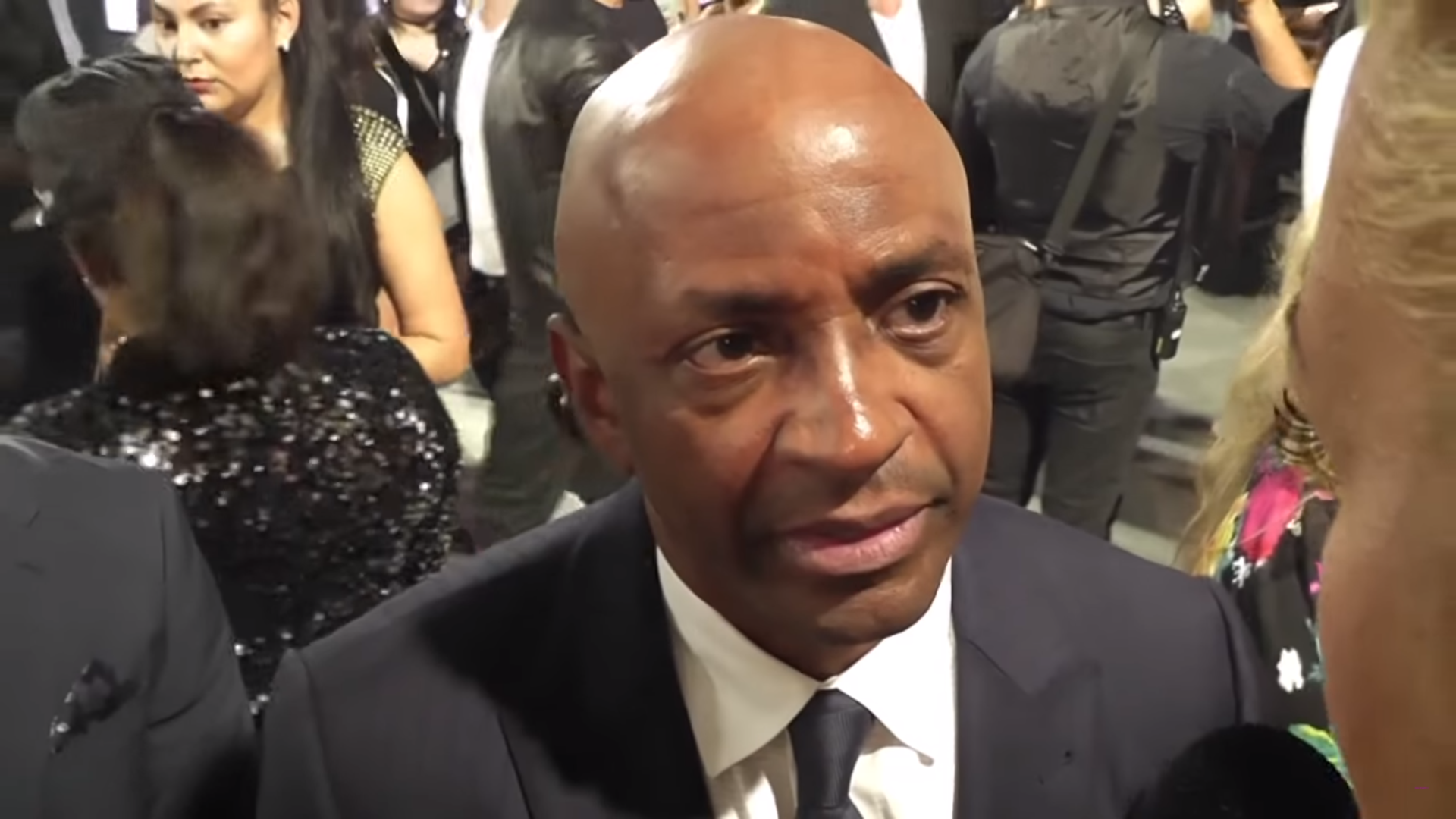
Two-time winner Sergio George.

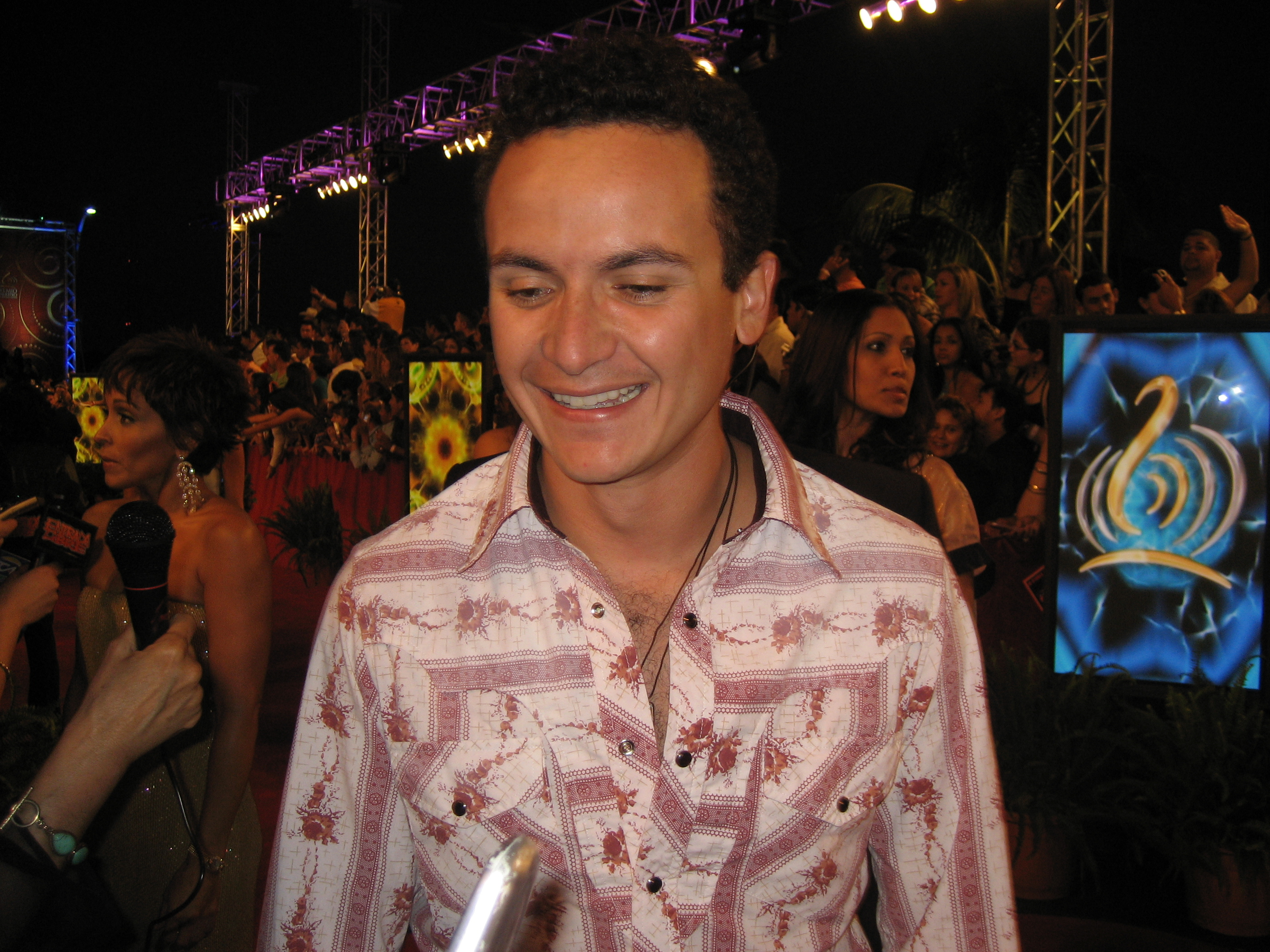
Three-time winner Fonseca.

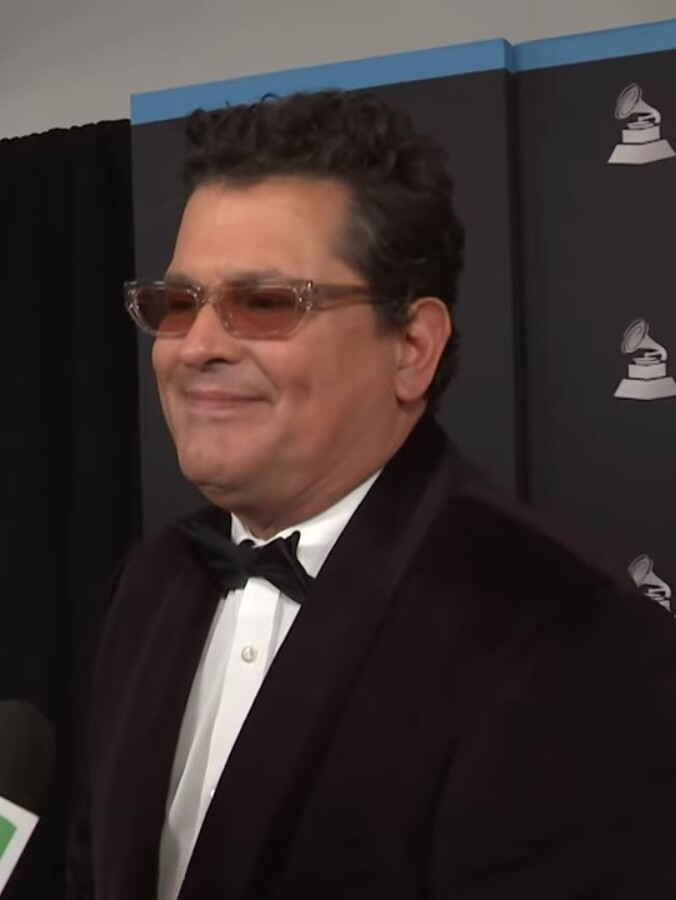
Four-time winner Carlos Vives.

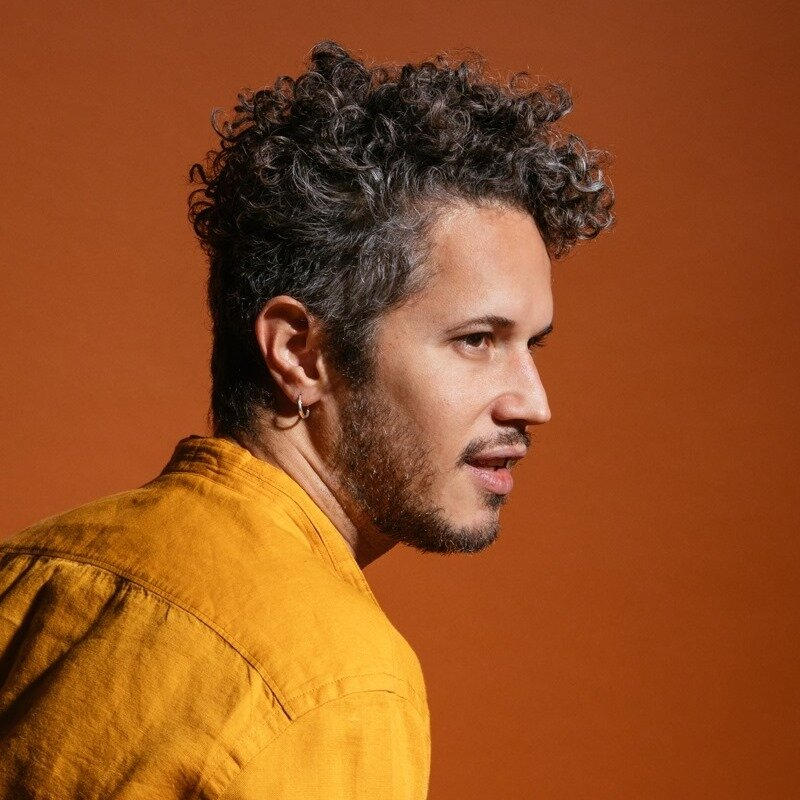
2017 winner Vicente García.

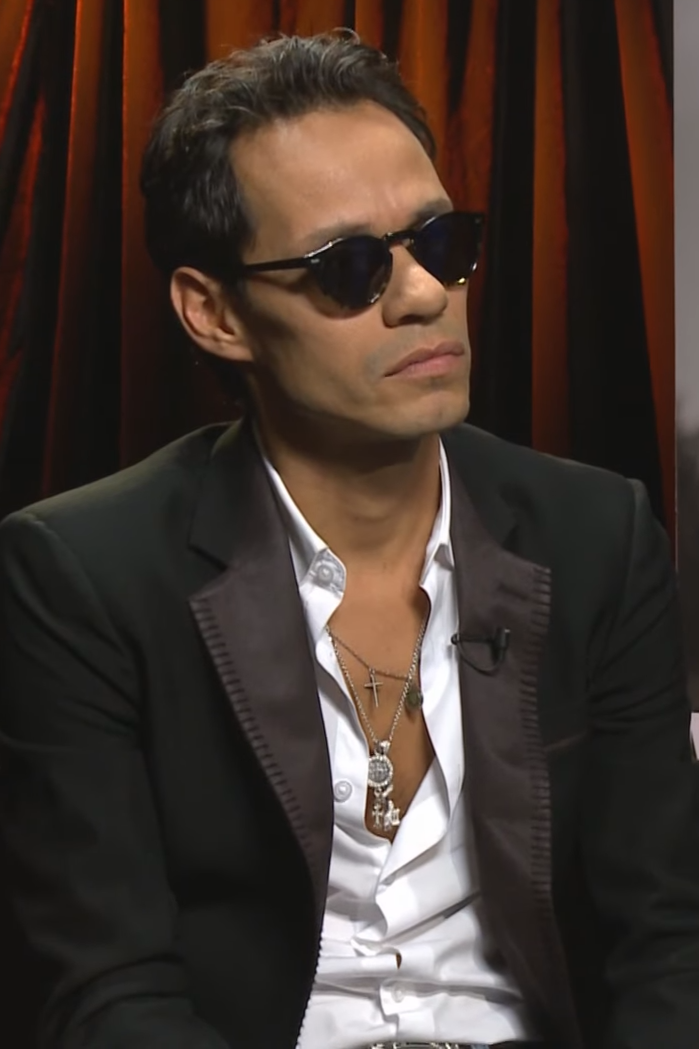
2022 winner Marc Anthony.

Year^{[I]}	Songwriter(s)	Work	Performing artist(s)^{[II]}	Nominees^{[III]}	Ref.
2000	Juan Luis Guerra	"El Niágara en Bicicleta"	Juan Luis Guerra 440	Omar Alfanno – "A Puro Dolor" (Son By Four); Emilio Estefan Jr. & Kike Santander – "Da La Vuelta" (Marc Anthony); Martin Madera – "Fruta Fresca" (Carlos Vives); Robert Blades, Emilio Estefan Jr. & Gloria Estefan – "No Me Dejes de Querer" (Gloria Estefan)	
2001	Kike Santander	"Júrame" (Merengue)	Gisselle	Albita – "Azúca' Pa' Tu Amargura" (Albita); Issac Delgado – "La Fórmula" (Isaac Delgado); Toño Rosario – "Yo Me Muero Por Ella" (Los Hermanos Rosario); Alejandro Jaén & William Paz – "Yo Si Me Enamoré" (Huey Dunbar)	
2002	Andrés Castro, Martín Madera & Carlos Vives	"Déjame Entrar"	Carlos Vives	Gustavo Arenas & Jorge Luis Piloto – "Como Olvidar" (Olga Tañón); Jandy Feliz – "La Pasión" (Jandy Feliz); Julio Castro – "Me Liberé" (El Gran Combo de Puerto Rico); Omar Alfanno – "Pueden Decir" (Gilberto Santa Rosa)	
2003	Sergio George & Jorge Villamizar	"Mi Primer Millón"	Bacilos	Elvis Crespo – "Bandida" (Elvis Crespo); Sergio George & Jorge Luis Piloto – "La Salsa Vive" (Tito Nieves); Kike Santander – "Por Más Que Intento" (Gilberto Santa Rosa); Ray Contreras, Jimmy Greco, India & Shirley Marte – "Sedúceme" (La India)	
2004	Sergio George & Fernando Osorio	"Ríe y Llora"	Celia Cruz	Albita – "Albita Llegó" (Albita); Raúl del Sol & Jorge Luis Piloto – "Creo en el Amor" (Rey Ruiz); Gian Marco – "Hoy" (Gloria Estefan); Emilio Estefan, Jr. & Víctor Manuelle – "Tengo Ganas (Salsa)" (Víctor Manuelle)	
2005	Juan Luis Guerra	"Las Avispas"	Juan Luis Guerra 440	Cachao – "Ahora Sí " (Cachao); José Luis Morín & Olga Tañón – "Bandolero" (Olga Tañón); Carlos Medina & Carlos Vives – "Como Tú" (Carlos Vives); Marc Anthony & Estéfano – "Valió La Pena" (Marc Anthony)	
2006	Fonseca	"Te Mando Flores"	Fonseca	Victor Manuelle – "Dos Soneros, Una Historia" (Gilberto Santa Rosa & Victor Manuelle); Yoel Henríquez & Jorge Luis Piloto – "Esa Boquita" (Tito Nieves); Victor Manuelle – "I Love Salsa!" (N'Klabe); Cabas & Kike Santander – "La Cadena De Oro" (Cabas)	
2007	Juan Luis Guerra	"La Llave de Mi Corazón"	Juan Luis Guerra 440	Doejo & Juan José Hernández – "Arroz con Habichuela" (El Gran Combo de Puerto Rico); Yoel Henriquez & Jorge Luis Piloto – "La Mujer Que Más Te Duele" (Issac Delgado featuring Víctor Manuelle); José Gaviria Escobar – "No Te Pido Flores" (Fanny Lú)	
2008	Emilio Estefan, Jr., Gloria Estefan, Alberto Gaitán & Ricardo Gaitán	"Píntame De Colores"	Gloria Estefan	Juan José Hernández – "Conteo Regresivo" (Gilberto Santa Rosa); Victor Manuelle – "Llegó El Amor" (Gilberto Santa Rosa); Jorge Celedón – "Me Vio Llorar" (Jorge Celedón & Jimmy Zambrano)	
2009	Jorge Luis Piloto & Jorge Villamizar	"Yo No Sé Mañana"	Luis Enrique	Daniel Santacruz – "A Donde Va El Amor?" (Daniel Santacruz); Joan Ortiz & Tito El Bambino – "El Amor" (Tito El Bambino); Juan de Luque Díaz Granados & Juan Vicente Zambrano – "Esa Muchachita" (Mauricio & Palodeagua); Alberto Gaitán & Ricardo Gaitán – "No Vale La Pena" (Issac Delgado)	
2010	Juan Luis Guerra	"Bachata en Fukuoka"	Juan Luis Guerra 440	Fonseca & Willie Colón – "Estar Lejos" (Fonseca); Jorge Chacin & Fernando Osorio – "Sueño Contigo" (Tecupae featuring Cabas); Huey Dunbar & Jorge Luis Piloto – "Te Amaré" (Huey Dunbar); Tito El Bambino – "Te Pido Perdón" (Tito El Bambino)	
2011	Calle 13	"Vamo' A Portarnos Mal"	Calle 13	Juan Magan – "Bailando Por Ahí" (Juan Magan); Alex Bandana, Gloria Estrada & La Marisoul – "La Negra" (La Santa Cecilia); Rafi Monclova & Gilberto Santa Rosa – "Me Cambiaron Las Preguntas" (Gilberto Santa Rosa); Yoel Henríquez – "Me Duele la Cabeza" (Hector Acosta "el Torito")	
2012	Yoel Henríquez & Alex Puentes	"Toma Mi Vida"	Milly Quezada and Juan Luis Guerra	Tamela Hedström – "¡Acercate!" (Tamela Featuring Son De Tikizia); Alejandro Bassi & Fonseca – "Desde Que No Estás" (Fonseca); Chino y Nacho & Pablo Villalobos – "El Poeta" (Chino y Nacho); Yoel Henríquez, Horacio Palencia & Jorge Luis Piloto – "Eres Linda" (Tito Nieves)	
2013	Andrés Castro & Carlos Vives	"Volví a Nacer"	Carlos Vives	Yoel Henríquez & Amerika Jiménez – "No Soy Un Hombre Malo" (Héctor Acosta "El Torito"); Sergio George & Jorge Luis Piloto – "Para Celebrar" (Varios Artistas); Jorge Luis Piloto – "Si Yo Fuera Tú" (Gilberto Santa Rosa); Víctor Víctor – "Y Yo Dejándola" (Víctor Víctor)	
2014	Andrés Castro & Carlos Vives	"Cuando Nos Volvamos a Encontrar"	Carlos Vives featuring Marc Anthony	Andrés Castro, Guianko Gómez, Juan Riveros & Prince Royce – "Darte un Beso" (Prince Royce); Descemer Bueno, Lenny Medina & Enrique Iglesias – "Loco" (Enrique Iglesias featuring Romeo Santos); Jorge Luis Chacin & Fernando Osorio – "Regalo" (Rey Ruiz); Johann Morales – "Te Doy Mi Voz" (Ronald Borjas)	
2015	Juan Luis Guerra	"Tus Besos"	Juan Luis Guerra	Andrés Castro & Víctor Manuelle – "Agua Bendita" (Víctor Manuelle); Edgar Barrera, Efraín Dávila, Guianko Gómez & Leslie Grace – "Cómo Duele El Silencio" (Leslie Grace); Gusi – "Tú Tienes Razón (Bachata)"; Alex Cuba, Luis Enrique & Fernando Osorio – "Ya Comenzó" (Luis Enrique)	
2016	Omar Alfanno, Fonseca & Yadam González Cárdenas	"Vine A Buscarte"	Fonseca	Jorge Luis Piloto – "Esta Noche Hay Fiesta" (Maía); Antonio Ávila – "La Bala" (Johnny Ventura featuring Gilberto Santa Rosa); Prince Royce & Daniel Santacruz – "La Carretera" (Prince Royce); Orlando Rodríguez Di Pietro – "No Me Daba Cuenta" (Gabriel C)	
2017	Vicente García	"Bachata en Kingston"	Vicente García	Raul del Sol & Jorge Luis Piloto – "Cuando Beso Tu Boca" (Mojito Lite); Manny Cruz, Prince Royce, Daniel Santacruz & Shakira – "Deja Vu"(Prince Royce featuring Shakira); Medardo Rovayo – "Dejé de Amar" (Felipe Muñiz featuring Marc Anthony); Residente – "Hijos del Cañaveral" (Residente)	
2018	Juan Luis Guerra, Juan Carlos Luces & Víctor Manuelle	"Quiero Tiempo"	Víctor Manuelle featuring Juan Luis Guerra	Silvestre Dangond, Nicky Jam, Juan Medina, Mauricio Rengifo & Andrés Torres – "Casate Conmigo" (Silvestre Dangond Featuring Nicky Jam); Jorge Luis Piloto – "Enamórate Bailando" (Reynier Pérez y Su Septeto Acarey Featuring Gilberto Santa Rosa); Jorge Luis Piloto, Jean Rodríguez & Tony Succar – "Me Enamoro Más De Ti" (Tony Succar featuring Jean Rodríguez); Fonseca, Mauricio Rengifo & Andrés Torres – "Simples Corazones" (Fonseca)	
2019	Juan Luis Guerra	"Kitipun"	Juan Luis Guerra 4.40	Luis Enrique & Jorge Luis Piloto – "El Afortunado" (Septeto Acarey featuring Luis Enrique); Jorge Luis Piloto & Tony Succar – "Mas de Mi" (Tony Succar featuring Angel López); Bobby Allende, Waddys Jáquez, David Maldonado & Adan Pérez – "Subiendo y Bajando" (8 y Más featuring Rubén Blades); Jorge Luis Piloto – "Vivir Es Complicado" (Andrés Cepeda & Dayhan Díaz)	
2020	Rubén Blades & Carlos Vives	"Canción para Rubén"	Carlos Vives & Rubén Blades	Kany García & Carlos Vives – "Búscame" (Kany García & Carlos Vives); Elvis Crespo & Maribel Vega – "Imaginarme sin Ti" (Elvis Crespo & Manny Cruz); Paula Arenas, Debi Nova & Juan Pablo Vega – "Quédate" (Debi Nova & Pedro Capó); Pavel Nuñez – "Y Basta Ya" (Pavel Nuñez)	
2021	Camilo, David Julca, Jonathan Julca, Yasmil Marrufo & Ricardo Montaner	"Dios Así lo Quiso"	Ricardo Montaner & Juan Luis Guerra	Santiago Larramendi & Gaby Moreno – "Bolero a la Vida" (Omara Portuondo featuring Gaby Moreno); Alfredo Nodarse – "Más Feliz Que Ayer" (Chabuco); Juan Luis Guerra – "Pambiche de Novia" (Juan Luis Guerra); Jorge Luis Piloto – "Un Sueño Increíble (Homenaje a Jairo Varela)" (Dayhan Díaz & Charlie Cardona)	
2022	Marc Anthony & Álvaro Lenier Mesa	"Mala"	Marc Anthony	Mario Cáceres, Jorge Luis Chacín, Kany García, Richi López & Yasmil Marrufo – "Agüita e Coco" (Kany García); Jorge Luis Piloto – "El Malecón vió el Final" (Amaury Gutiérrez); Juan Botero, Miguel Henao, Alvaro Negret, Santiago Restrepo, Joaquin Rodríguez, Juan José Roesel, Sin Ánimo De Lucro, José Nicolás Urdinola, Juan "One" Sebastián Valencia & Carlos Vives – "El Parrandero (Masters en Parranda)" (Carlos Vives, Sin Ánimo De Lucro, JBot & Tuti); Luis Figueroa & Yoel Henríquez – "Fiesta Contigo" (Luis Figueroa)	
2023	Fonseca, Yadam González & Yoel Henríquez	"Si Tú Me Quieres"	Fonseca & Juan Luis Guerra	Edgar Barrera, Camila Cabello, Camilo & Juan Morelli – "Ambulancia" (Camilo & Camila Cabello); Pablo Milanés – "Día de Luz (80 Aniversario)" (Pablo Milanés featuring Juanes); Edgar Barrera, Nico Cotton, Gale, Marshmello, Miguel Andres Martinez Perea, Juan Diego Medina Vélez, Julián Turizo Zapata & Manuel Turizo – "El Merengue" (Marshmello & Manuel Turizo); Marc Anthony, Edgar Barrera, René David Cano Ríos, Sergio George, Kevin Mauricio Jiménez Londoño, Bryan Snaider Lezcano Chaverra, Maluma & Justin Rafael Quiles – "La Fórmula" (Maluma & Marc Anthony); Techy Fatule – "Que Me Quedes Tú" (Techy Fatule)	
2024	Juan Luis Guerra	"Mambo 23"	Juan Luis Guerra	Renesito Avich & Rafael "Pollo" Brito – "Baila y Goza" (Renesito Avich featuring Rafael "Pollo" Brito); Jorge Luis Chacín, Fonseca & Miguel Yadam González Cárdenas – "Con Dinero y Sin Dinero" (Fonseca & Grupo Niche); Jorge Luis Piloto – "Hasta Que Aguante el Cuerpo" (Dayhan Díaz & Pupy Santiago); Luis Figueroa & Yoel Henríquez – "Llorar Bonito" (Luis Figueroa)	
2025	Edgar Barrera, Andres Jael Correa Rios & Karol G	"Si Antes Te Hubiera Conocido"	Karol G	Juan José Hernandez – "Ahora o Nunca" (Gilberto Santa Rosa); Techy Fatule – "Cariñito" (Techy Fatule); Larry Coll, Luis Enrique & Marcos Sánchez – "La Foto" (Luis Enrique); Rubén Blades, Andy Clay, Fonseca, Felipe González Abad & Yoel Henríquez – "Nunca Me Fui" (Fonseca & Rubén Blades); Jorge Luis Piloto – "Si Volviera Jesús" (Víctor Manuelle); Andy Clay, Fonseca & Alberto Montenegro – "Venga Lo Que Venga" (Fonseca & Rawayana)	

- ^{^[I]} Each year is linked to the article about the Latin Grammy Awards held that year.
- ^{^[II]} The performing artist is only listed but does not receive the award.
- ^{^[III]} Showing the name of the songwriter(s), the nominated song and in parentheses the performer's name(s).

== See also ==
- Latin Grammy Award for Song of the Year
- Latin Grammy Award for Best Traditional Tropical Album
- Latin Grammy Award for Best Contemporary Tropical Album
