= Caraluna (song) =

Single by Bacilos

from the album Caraluna
- Released: May 27, 2002
- Genre: Latin pop
- Length: 4:26
- Label: WEA International
- Songwriter: Jorge Villamizar

Bacilos singles chronology
"Besela Ya" (2001)	"Caraluna" (2002)	"Mi Primer Millón" (2003)

"Caraluna" is a song written by Jorge Villamizar and performed by Bacilos. The song is the first single of the album Caraluna and was nominated in 2003 for a Latin Grammy Award for Song of the Year.

== Chart performance ==
Chart (2002)	Peak position
Panama (Notimex)	1
US Hot Latin Songs (Billboard)	16
US Latin Pop Airplay (Billboard)	11
