= Latin Grammy Award for Song of the Year =

Latin Grammy Award category

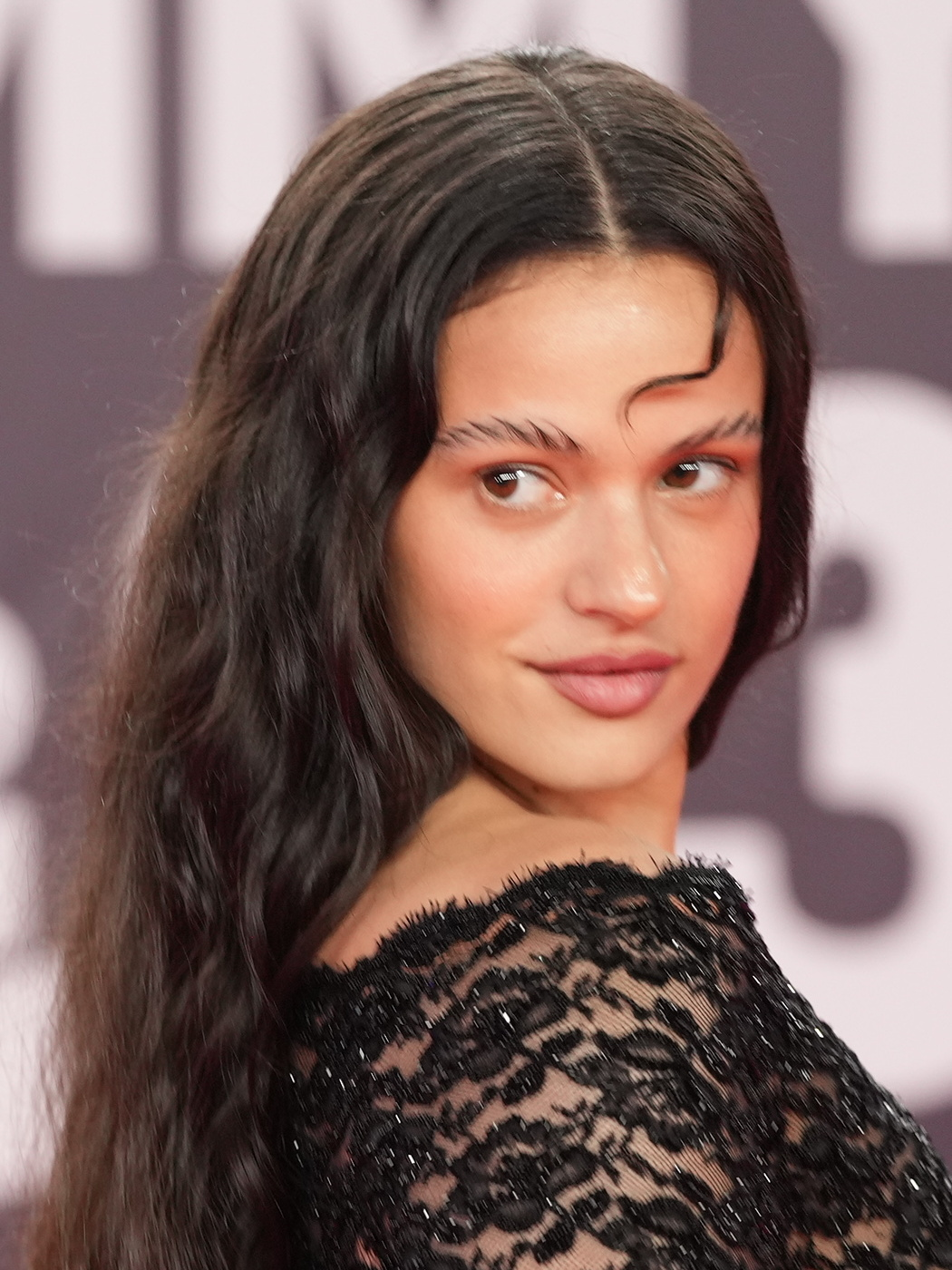
- "La Perla" by Rosalía & Yahritza y su Esencia is the most recent recipient
- Awarded for: excellence in Latin music songwriting
- Country: United States
- Presented by: The Latin Recording Academy
- First award: 2000
- Currently held by: "La Perla" by Rosalía & Yahritza y su Esencia (2026)
- Website: latingrammy.com (in Spanish, English, and Portuguese)

The Latin Grammy Award for Song of the Year is an honor presented annually at the Latin Grammy Awards, a ceremony that recognizes excellence, creates a wider awareness of cultural diversity and contributions of Latin recording artists in the United States and internationally. The award is given to the songwriters of new songs containing at least 51% of lyrics in Spanish or Portuguese language. Instrumental songs or a new version of a previously recorded track are not eligible. Due to the increasing musical changes in the industry, from 2012 the category includes 10 nominees, according to a restructuration made by the academy for the four general categories: Album of the Year, Record of the Year, Best New Artist and Song of the Year.

Seventeen awarded songs have also earned the Latin Grammy for Record of the Year, which unlike this category, is given to songs that were released on a promotional level, and the prize is given to the performer, producer and audio engineer. The exceptions to this were in 2000, 2009 and 2013 when "Corazón Espinado" by Santana featuring Maná, "No Hay Nadie Como Tú" by Calle 13 featuring Café Tacvba and "Vivir Mi Vida" by Marc Anthony, respectively, received the award without a nomination for Song of the Year.

Alejandro Sanz is the most awarded songwriter in the category with four wins out of twelve nominations. He's followed by Jorge Drexler and Shakira with three wins. Meanwhile, Andrés Castro, Luis Fonsi, and Carlos Vives have received the award twice. In 2017, Colombian artist Maluma became the first songwriter to have three nominated songs in the same year, with "Chantaje", "Felices los 4", and "Vente Pa' Ca". Claudia Brant, Angie Chirino, Joy Huerta (of the Mexican band Jesse & Joy), Natalia Lafourcade, Shakira, and Mónica Vélez are the only female writers to be awarded. In 2023, Shakira became the first female artist in history to receive three nominations for the category in the same year with "TQG", "Acróstico", and "Shakira: Bzrp Music Sessions, Vol. 53", ultimately winning for the latter.

== Recipients ==
An asterisk (*) indicates this recording also won Record of the Year.

Year^{[I]}	Songwriter(s)	Work	Performing artist(s)^{[II]}	Nominees^{[III]}
2000	Roberto Blades, Angie Chirino, Marc Anthony & Cory Rooney	"Dímelo"	Marc Anthony	Juan Luis Guerra – "El Niágara en Bicicleta" (Guerra); Juan Carlos Calderón – "O Tú o Ninguna" (Luis Miguel); Fito Páez – "Al Lado del Camino" (Páez); Martín Madera – "Fruta Fresca" (Carlos Vives)
2001	Alejandro Sanz	"El Alma al Aire" *	Alejandro Sanz	Francisco Céspedes – "Dónde Está la Vida" (Céspedes); Alejandro Lerner – "Amarte Así" (Lerner); Juanes – "Fíjate Bien" (Juanes); Estéfano – "Y Yo Sigo Aquí" (Paulina Rubio)
2002	Alejandro Sanz	"Y Sólo Se Me Ocurre Amarte" *	Alejandro Sanz	Miguel Bosé, Lanfranco Ferrario, Massimo Grilli – "Morenamia" (Bosé); Sergio George, Fernando Osorio – "La Negra Tiene Tumbao" (Celia Cruz); Juanes – "A Dios le Pido" (Juanes); Andrés Castro, Martín Madera, Carlos Vives – "Déjame Entrar" (Vives)
2003	Juanes	"Es Por Ti" *	Juanes	Jorge Villamizar – "Caraluna" (Bacilos); Jorge Villamizar & Sergio George – "Mi Primer Millón" (Bacilos); Natalia Lafourcade – "En el 2000" (Lafourcade); Franco De Vita – "Tal Vez" (Ricky Martin)
2004	Alejandro Sanz	"No Es Lo Mismo" *	Alejandro Sanz	Emmanuel del Real – "Eres" (Café Tacvba); Kevin Johansen – "La Procesión" (Johansen); Robi Draco Rosa, Luis Gómez-Escolar, Itaal Shur – "Más y Más" (Rosa); Julieta Venegas & Coti Sorokin – "Andar Conmigo" (Venegas)
2005	Alejandro Sanz	"Tu No Tienes Alma" *	Alejandro Sanz	Bebe – "Malo" (Bebe); Elsten Torres, Obie Bermúdez – "Todo el Año" (Bermúdez); Jorge Drexler – "Al Otro Lado del Río" (Drexler); Aleks Syntek – "Duele el Amor" (Syntek featuring Ana Torroja)
2006	Shakira & Luis F. Ochoa	"La Tortura" *	Shakira featuring Alejandro Sanz	Ricardo Arjona – "Acompáñame a Estar Solo" (Arjona); Amaury Gutiérrez – "Nada Es Para Siempre" (Luis Fonsi); Lena – "Tu Corazón" (Lena); Ricardo Montaner and Pablo Manavello – "Cuando a Mi Lado Estás" (Montaner)
2007	Juan Luis Guerra	"La Llave de Mi Corazón" *	Juan Luis Guerra	Belinda, Nacho Peregrín and Kara DioGuardi – "Bella Traición" (Belinda); Mario Domm – "Todo Cambió" (Camila); Franco De Vita – "Tengo" (De Vita); Fher Olvera – "Labios Compartidos" (Maná)
2008	Juanes	"Me Enamora" *	Juanes	Café Tacvba – "Esta Vez" (Café Tacvba); Kany García – "Hoy Ya Me Voy" (García); Julieta Venegas – "El Presente" (Venegas); Gian Marco Zignago – "Todavía" (Gian Marco)
2009	Claudia Brant, Luis Fonsi & Gen Reuben	"Aquí Estoy Yo"	Luis Fonsi featuring David Bisbal, Noel Schajris and Aleks Syntek	Bebe and Carlos Jean – "Me Fuí" (Bebe); Yoel Henríquez and Jorge Luis Piloto – "Día Tras Día" (Andrés Cepeda); Alejandro Lerner – "Verte Sonreir" (Lerner); Jorge Luis Piloto and Jorge Villamizar – "Yo No Sé Mañana" (Luis Enrique)
2010	Mario Domm & Mónica Vélez	"Mientes" *	Camila	Rubén Blades – "Las Calles" (Blades); Jorge Drexler – "Una Canción Me Trajo Hasta Aquí" (Drexler); Enrique Iglesias and Descemer Bueno – "Cuando Me Enamoro" (Iglesias featuring Juan Luis Guerra); Alejandro Sanz and Tommy Torres – "Desde Cuándo" (Sanz)
2011	Rafa Arcaute & Calle 13	"Latinoamérica" *	Calle 13 featuring Totó la Momposina, Susana Baca and Maria Rita	Marco Antonio Solís — "¿A Dónde Vamos A Parar? (Solís); Jorge Drexler — "Que El Soneto Nos Tome Por Sorpresa (On the Soundtrack Lope)" (Drexler); Pablo Alborán — "Solamente Tú" (Alborán); Eric Bazilian, Claudia Brant, Andreas Carlsson, Desmond Child and Ricky Martín — "Lo Mejor de Mi Vida Eres Tú (Ricky Martín featuring Natalia Jiménez)
2012	Jesse & Joy & Tommy Torres	"¡Corre!" *	Jesse & Joy	Juan Luis Guerra, Juanes & Joaquín Sabina — "Azul Sabina" (Juanes featuring Joaquín Sabina); Kiko Cibrián, Gilberto Marín, Julio Ramírez & Mónica Vélez — "Creo en Tí" (Reik); Carla Morrison — "Déjenme Llorar" (Morrison); Juan Luis Guerra — "En El Cielo No Hay Hospital" (Guerra); Jose Luis Latorre, Antonio Orozco and Xavi Pérez — "Estoy Hecho de Pedacitos de Ti" (Antonio Orozco featuring Alejandro Fernández); Maycon Ananias and Cassyano Correr — "Extranjero" (María Gadú); Ricardo Arjona — "Fuiste Tú" (Ricardo Arjona featuring Gaby Moreno); Amaury Gutiérrez and Gian Marco — "Invisible" (Gian Marco); Alejandro Sanz — "No Me Compares" (Sanz)
2013	Andrés Castro & Carlos Vives	"Volví a Nacer"	Carlos Vives	Roberto Carlos — "Esse Cara Sou Eu" (Carlos); José Luis Pardo — "La Que Me Gusta" (Los Amigos Invisibles); Mario Domm, Hanna Huerta, and Jesse & Joy — "Llorar" (Jesse & Joy featuring Domm); Amaury Gutiérrez — "Lo Mejor Que Hay En Mi Vida" (Andrés Cepeda); Alejandro Sanz — "Mi Marciana" (Sanz); Ricardo Arjona — "Mi Novia Se Me Está Poniendo Vieja" (Arjona); Jorge Luis Piloto — "Si Yo Fuera Tú" (Gilberto Santa Rosa); Aleks Syntek — "Sólo El Amor Nos Salvará" (Syntek featuring Malú); Caetano Veloso — "Um Abraçaço" (Veloso)
2014	Descemer Bueno, Gente De Zona & Enrique Iglesias	"Bailando"	Enrique Iglesias featuring Descemer Bueno & Gente De Zona	Caetano Veloso — "A Bossa Nova É Foda"; Yoel Henríquez and Julio Reyes Copello — "Cambio de Piel" (Marc Anthony); Manu Moreno & Aleks Syntek — "Corazones Invencibles"; Andrés Castro & Carlos Vives — "Cuando Nos Volvamos a Encontrar" (Carlos Vives featuring Marc Anthony); Andrés Castro, Guianko Gómez, Juan Riveros & Prince Royce — "Darte un Beso" (Prince Royce); Mario Domm, Lauren Evans & Mónica Vélez — "Decidiste Dejarme" (Camila); Jesse & Joy — "Mi Tesoro"; Calle 13 & Silvio Rodríguez — "Ojos Color Sol"; Jorge Drexler & Ana Tijoux — "Universos Paralelos"
2015	Leonel García & Natalia Lafourcade	"Hasta la Raíz"*	Natalia Lafourcade	Pedro Capó, Yoel Henríquez, Ricky Martin and Rafael Esparza Ruiz — "Disparo al Corazón"; Julieta Venegas — "Ese Camino"; Beatriz Luengo, Antonio Rayo Gibo, Yotuel Romero and Diego Torres — "Hoy Es Domingo"; Pablo Alborán — "Por Fin"; Claudia Brant and Natalia Jiménez — "Quédate Con Ella"; Leonel García — "¿Recuerdas?"; Alejandro Sanz — "Un Zombie a la Intemperie"; Gian Marco — "Vida de Mi Vida"; Pedro Capó — "Vivo"
2016	Andrés Castro, Shakira & Carlos Vives	"La Bicicleta"*	Carlos Vives & Shakira	Patty Brayden, Ned Claflin and John Finbury — "A Chama Verde" (John Finbury featuring Marcella Camargo); Manuel Medrano — "Bajo el Agua" (Medrano); Celso Fonseca — "Céu" (Fonseca); Enrique Iglesias, Patrick A. Ingunza, Silverlo Lozada, Servando Moriche Primera Mussett, Hasibur Rahman, Francisco Saldana and Wisin — "Duele el Corazón" (Enrique Iglesias featuring Wisin); Jesse & Joy, Danelle Leverett, Jason Reeves and Rune Westberg — "Ecos de Amor" (Jesse & Joy); Sin Bandera — "En Ésta No" (Sin Bandera); Kevin Johansen — "Es Como el Día" (Kevin Johansen + The Nada); Moska and Fito Páez — "Hermanos" (Fito Páez & Moska); Flavio Cianciarulo — "La Tormenta" (Los Fabulosos Cadillacs)
2017	Daddy Yankee, Erika Ender and Luis Fonsi	"Despacito"*	Luis Fonsi featuring Daddy Yankee	Ricardo Arjona — "Ella" (Ricardo Arjona); Descemer Bueno and Melendi — "Desde Que Estamos Juntos" (Melendi); Mario Cáceres, Kevin Mauricio Jiménez Londoño, Maluma, Servando Primera, Stiven Rojas and Bryan Snaider Lezcano Chaverra — "Felices los 4" (Maluma); Diana Fuentes and Tommy Torres — "La Fortuna" (Diana Fuentes featuring Tommy Torres); Nermin Harambasic, Maluma, Ricky Martin, Mauricio Montaner, Ricky Montaner, Lars Pedersen, Carl Ryden, Justin Stein, Ronny Vidar Svendsen and Anne Judith Stokke Wik — "Vente Pa' Ca" (Ricky Martin featuring Maluma); Mon Laferte — "Amárrame" (Mon Laferte featuring Juanes); Kevin Mauricio Jiménez Londoño, Bryan Snaider Lezcano Chaverra, Joel Antonio López Castro, Maluma and Shakira — "Chantaje" (Shakira featuring Maluma); Natalia Lafourcade — "Tú Sí Sabes Quererme" (Natalia Lafourcade featuring Los Macorinos); Residente and Jeff Trooko — "Guerra" (Residente)
2018	Jorge Drexler	"Telefonía"*	Jorge Drexler	Manú Jalil and Mon Laferte — "Antes de Ti" (Mon Laferte); Monsieur Periné — "Bailar Contigo" (Monsieur Periné); David Aguilar Dorantes and Natalia Lafourcade — "Danza de Gardenias" (Lafourcade featuring Los Macorinos); El David Aguilar — "Embrujo" (El David Aguilar); Rozalén — "La Puerta Violeta" (Rozalén); Antón Alvarez Alfaro, Pablo Diaz-Reixa & Rosalía — "Malamente" (Rosalía); Kany García — "Para Siempre" (Kany García); Mauricio Rengifo, Andrés Torres, Carlos Vives and Sebastian Yatra — "Robarte un Beso" (Vives and Yatra); Fito Páez — "Tu Vida, Mi Vida" (Fito Páez)
2019	Pedro Capó, Gabriel Edgar González Pérez and George Noriega	"Calma"	Pedro Capó	Rafael Arcaute, Alessia Cara, Camilo Echeverry, Juanes, Mauricio Montaner, Ricardo Montaner and Tainy – "Querer Mejor" (Juanes and Cara); Rubén Blades — "El País" (Blades); Camila Cabello and Alejandro Sanz — "Mi Persona Favorita" (Sanz and Cabello); Fonseca — "Ven" (Fonseca); Kany García and Tommy Torres — "Quédate" (García and Torres); Juan Luis Guerra — "Kitipun" (Juan Luis Guerra 4.40); Tiago Iorc — "Desconstrução" (Tiago Iorc); Mauricio Rengifo, Andrés Torres and Sebastián Yatra — "Un Año" (Yatra featuring Reik); Alejandro Sanz — "No Tengo Nada" (Sanz)
2020	Residente	"René"	Residente	Vicente Barco, Edgar Barrera, Maluma & Stiven Rojas — "ADMV" (Maluma); Juanes, Mauricio Rengifo, Andrés Torres & Sebastián Yatra — "Bonita" (Juanes and Sebastián Yatra); Jorge Drexler — "Codo con codo" (Jorge Drexler); Edgar Barrera, Camilo, Jon Leone, Richi López & Juan Morelli — "El Mismo Aire" (Camilo); Alejandro Sanz and Carlos Vives — "For Sale" (Alejandro Sanz and Carlos Vives); Alejandro Sanz — "#ElMundoAfuera (Improvisación)" (Alejandro Sanz); Kany García — "Lo que en ti veo" (Kany García and Nahuel Pennisi); Oscar Hernández and Pablo Preciado — "Tiburones" (Ricky Martin); Kevyn Mauricio Cruz Moreno, Karol G, Nicki Minaj and Daniel Oviedo Echavarría — "Tusa" (Karol G and Nicki Minaj); Camilo, Jon Leone & Richi López — "Tutu" (Camilo and Pedro Capó)
2021	Descemer Bueno, El Funky, Gente De Zona, Yadam González, Beatriz Luengo, Maykel Osorbo & Yotuel	"Patria y Vida"	Yotuel, Gente De Zona, Descemer Bueno, Maykel Osorbo, El Funky	Paula Arenas & Maria Elisa Ayerbe – "A Tu Lado" (Paula Arenas); Diamante Eléctrico – "A Veces" (Diamante Eléctrico); J Balvin, Alejandro Borrero, Jhay Cortez, Kevyn Mauricio Cruz Moreno, Derek Drymon, Mark Harrison, Stephen Hillenburg, Alejandro Ramirez, Ivanni Rodríguez, Blaise Smith, Tainy & Juan Camilo Vargas – "Agua" (Tainy & J Balvin); Rafa Arcaute, Ricky Martin, Mauricio Rengifo, Andrés Torres & Carlos Vives – "Canción Bonita" (Carlos Vives & Ricky Martin); Camilo, David Julca, Jonathan Julca, Yasmil Jesús Marrufo & Ricardo Montaner – "Dios Así lo Quiso" (Ricardo Montaner & Juan Luis Guerra); Édgar Barrera, René Cano, Kevyn Cruz, Johan Espinosa, Kevin Jiménez, Miky La Sensa, Bryan Lezcano, Maluma, Andrés Uribe & Juan Camilo Vargas – "Hawái" (Maluma); Javier Limón – "Mi Guitarra" (Javier Limón, Juan Luis Guerra & Nella); El David Aguilar & Mon Laferte – "Que Se Sepa Nuestro Amor" (Mon Laferte & Alejandro Fernández); Pablo Alborán, Nicolás “Na’vi” De La Espriella, Diana Fuentes & Julio Reyes Copello – "Si Hubieras Querido" (Pablo Alborán); Rauw Alejandro, José M. Collazo, Luis J. González, Rafael E. Pabón Navedo & Eric Pérez Rovira – "Todo de Ti" (Rauw Alejandro); Édgar Barrera & Camilo – "Vida de Rico" (Camilo)
2022	Jorge Drexler, Pablo Drexler, Víctor Martínez & C. Tangana	"Tocarte"*	Jorge Drexler & C. Tangana	Pedro Capó, Kiko Cibrian, Ricky Martin, Pablo Preciado, Julio Ramirez, Mauricio Rengifo & Andrés Torres – "A Veces Bien Y A Veces Mal" – (Ricky Martin featuring Reik); Rauw Alejandro, Emmanuel Anene, David Alberto Macias, Nile Rodgers, Juan Salinas, Oscar Salinas & Daddy Yankee – "Agua" (Daddy Yankee, Rauw Alejandro & Nile Rodgers); Mon Laferte – "Algo es Mejor" (Mon Laferte); Camilo, Jorge Luis Chacín, Andrés Leal, Martín Velilla & Carlos Vives – "Baloncito Viejo" (Carlos Vives & Camilo); Fonseca & Julio Reyes Copello – "Besos en la Frente" (Fonseca); Carla Morrison, Juan Alejandro Jimenez Perez & Mario Demian Jimenez Perez – "Encontrarme" (Carla Morrison); Larry Gold, Noah Goldstein, Chad Hugo, David Rodríguez, Rosalía, Jacob Sherman, Michael Uzowuru, Pilar Vila Tobella, Dylan Wiggins & Pharrell Williams – "Hentai" (Rosalía); Édgar Barrera & Camilo – "Índigo" – (Camilo & Evaluna Montaner); Christina Aguilera, Jorge Luis Chacín, Kat Dahlia, Becky G, Yoel Henríquez, Yasmil Marrufo, Nicki Nicole & Nathy Peluso – "Pa Mis Muchachas" (Christina Aguilera, Becky G, Nicki Nicole featuring Nathy Peluso); Kevyn Mauricio Cruz Moreno, Carolina Giraldo Navarro & Ovy on the Drums – "Provenza" (Karol G); Juan Jo, Manuel Lara, Manuel Lorente, Pablo & Sebastián Yatra – "Tacones Rojos" (Sebastián Yatra)
2023	Santiago Alvarado, Bizarrap, Kevyn Mauricio Cruz & Shakira	"Shakira: Bzrp Music Sessions, Vol. 53"	Bizarrap featuring Shakira	Kevyn Mauricio Cruz Moreno, L.E.X.U.Z, Luis Fernando Ochoa & Shakira – "Acróstico" (Shakira); Pablo Alborán & Maria Becerra – "Amigos" (Pablo Alborán featuring Maria Becerra); Natalia Lafourcade – "De Todas las Flores" (Natalia Lafourcade); Pedro Julian Tovar Oceguera – "Ella Baila Sola" (Eslabon Armado & Peso Pluma); Edgar Barrera, Camilo & Alejandro Sanz – "NASA" (Camilo & Alejandro Sanz); Luis Jiménez, Lasso & Agustín Zubillaga – "Ojos Marrones" (Lasso); Fonseca, Yadam González & Yoel Henríquez – "Si Tú Me Quieres" (Fonseca & Juan Luis Guerra); Kevyn Mauricio Cruz, Karol G, Ovy on the Drums & Shakira – "TQG" (Karol G featuring Shakira); Bad Bunny, Edgar Barrera, Marco Daniel Borrero & Andres Jael Correa Rios – "Un x100to" (Grupo Frontera featuring Bad Bunny)
2024	Jorge Drexler	"Derrumbe"	Jorge Drexler	Daymé Arocena & Vicente García – "A Fuego Lento" (Daymé Arocena & Vicente Garcia); Julio Reyes Copello & Mariana Vega – "A la Mitad" (Maura Nava); Rubén Blades, Gian Marco & Julio Reyes Copello – "Aún Me Sigo Encontrando" (Gian Marco & Rubén Blades); Marvin Hawkins Rodriguez, Jerry Di, La Pichu, Danny Ocean & Elena Rose – "Caracas en el 2000" (Elena Rose, Danny Ocean & Jerry Di); Édgar Barrera, Kevyn Mauricio Cruz, Manuel Lorente Freire, Lenin Yorney Palacios & Shakira – "(Entre Paréntesis)" (Shakira & Grupo Frontera); Édgar Barrera, Andrés Jael Correa Rios, Kevyn Mauricio Cruz Moreno, Karol G & Mag – "Mi Ex Tenía Razón" (Karol G); Édgar Barrera, Kevyn Mauricio Cruz, Luís Miguel Gómez Castaño, Maluma, Lenin Yorney Palacios & Juan Camilo Vargas – "Según Quién" (Maluma & Carín León); Rafa Arcaute, Kany García, Carín León & Richi López – "Te Lo Agradezco" (Kany García & Carín León); Leo Genovese, Residente & Sílvia Pérez Cruz – "313" (Residente, Sílvia Pérez Cruz & Penélope Cruz)
2025	Edgar Barrera, Andrés Jael Correa Rios & Karol G	"Si Antes Te Hubiera Conocido"	Karol G	Bad Bunny, Antonio Caraballo, Elikai, Julio Gaston, Armando Josue Lopez, Mag, Jay Anthony Nuñez, & Roberto Jose Rosado Torres – "Baile Inolvidable" (Bad Bunny); Andrés Cepeda, Mauricio Rengifo & Andrés Torres – "Bogotá" (Andrés Cepeda); Natalia Lafourcade – "Cancionera" (Natalia Lafourcade); Bad Bunny, Scott Dittrich, Julia Lewis, Mag, Roberto José Rosado Torres, Hugo René Sención Sanabria & Tyler Spry – "DTMF" (Bad Bunny); Rafa Arcaute, Gino Borri, Ca7riel & Paco Amoroso, Amanda Ibanez, Vicente Jiménez & Federico Vindver – "El Día del Amigo" (Ca7riel & Paco Amoroso); Mon Laferte – "Otra Noche de Llorar" (Mon Laferte); Luis Miguel Gómez Castaño, Manuel Lorente Freire, Elena Rose & Alejandro Sanz – "Palmeras en el Jardín" (Alejandro Sanz); Rafa Arcaute, Gino Borri, Ca7riel & Paco Amoroso, Gale, Vicente Jiménez & Federico Vindver – "#Tetas" (Ca7riel & Paco Amoroso); Liniker – "Veludo Marrom" (Liniker)
2026	Noah Goldstein, David Rodríguez, Rosalía, Ryan Tedder & Dylan Wiggins	"La Perla"	Rosalía	"Coleccionando Heridas" – Edgar Barrera, Kevyn Mauricio Cruz, Luis Miguel óomez Castaño & Karol G, songwriters (Karol G & Marco Antonio Solís); "¿Como Se Ama?" – Jorge Drexler & Mauro, songwriters (Jorge Drexler); "Dime" – Silvana Estrada, songwriter (Silvana Estrada); "Femme Fatale" – Mon Laferte, songwriter (Mon Laferte); "Hasta Jesús Tuvo un Mal Día" – Rafa Arcaute, Renee Barri, Ca7riel & Paco Amoroso, Vicente Jimenez “Vibarco”, Martin Kierszenbaum, John Ryan, Gordon Matthew Thomas Sumner & Federico Vindver, songwriters (Ca7riel & Paco Amoroso featuring Sting); "Humano" – Emmanuel Briceño, Juanes, Felipe Navia & Vivir Quintana, songwriters (Juanes & Vivir Quintana); "Mi Gran Amor" – Edgar Barrera, Becky G, Luis Miguel Gómez Castaño, Manuel Lorente, Daniel Rondón & Carlos Santana, songwriters (Santana featuring Becky G); "Nilo" – Massimo Giovanardi & Zanna, songwriters (Zanna); "Solifican12" – Santiago Alvarado, Milo J & Santiago Ruiz, songwriters (Milo J)

- ^{^[I]} Each year is linked to the article about the Latin Grammy Awards held that year.
- ^{^[II]} The performing artist is only listed but does not receive the award.
- ^{^[III]} Showing the name of the songwriter(s), the nominated song and in parentheses the performer's name(s).
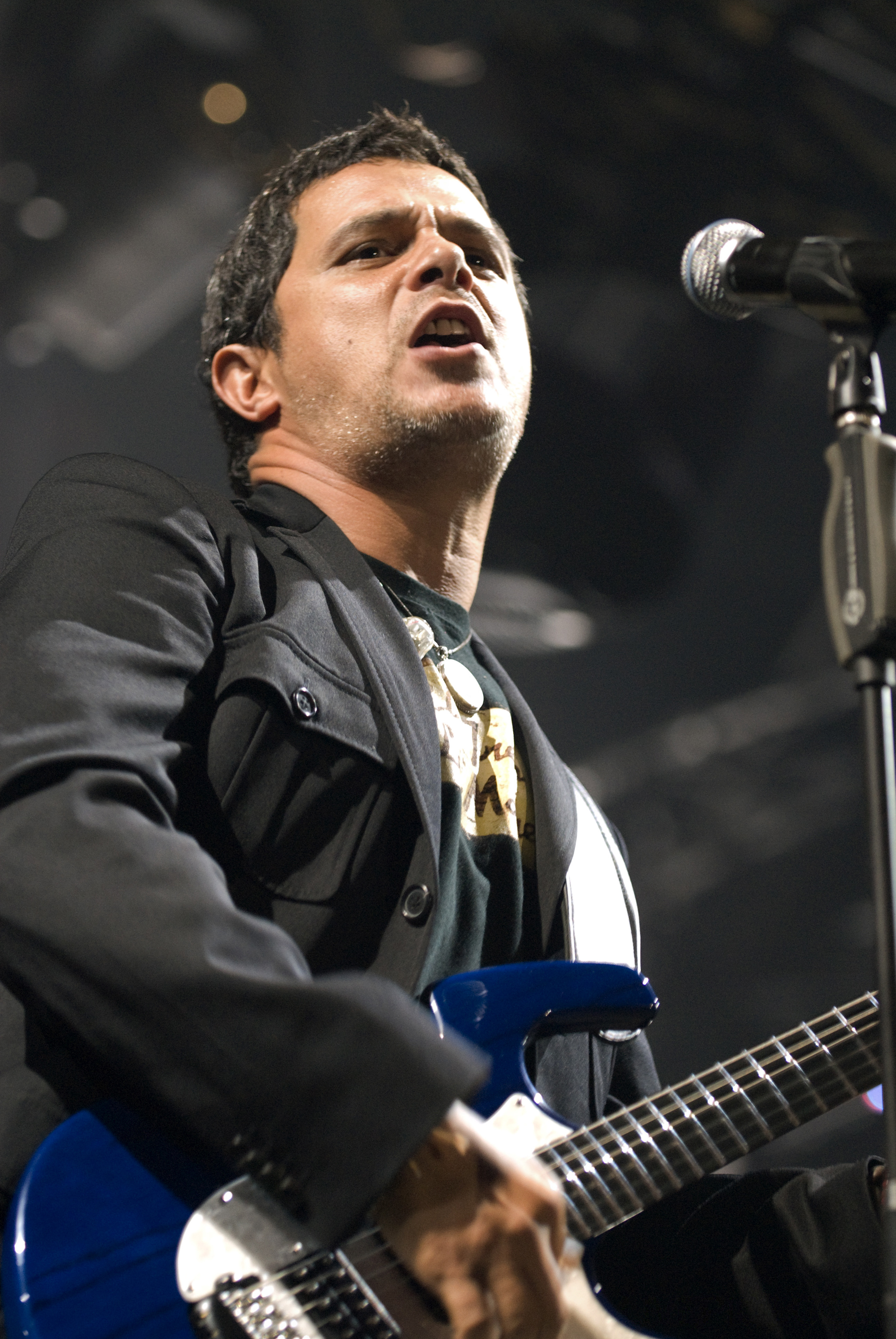
Alejandro Sanz is the most awarded performer in this category with four wins.

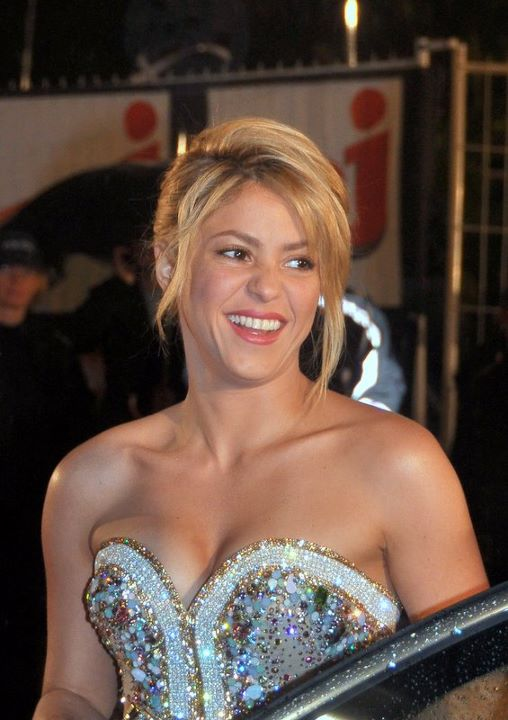
Colombian singer Shakira received the award in 2006, 2016, and 2023

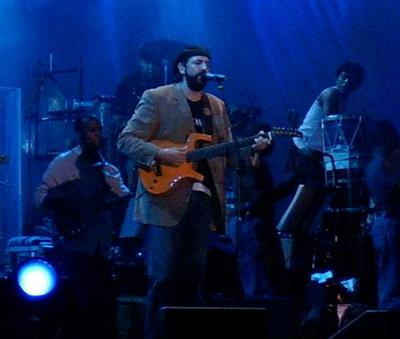
Dominican singer-songwriter Juan Luis Guerra received the award in 2007 for "La Llave de Mi Corazón".

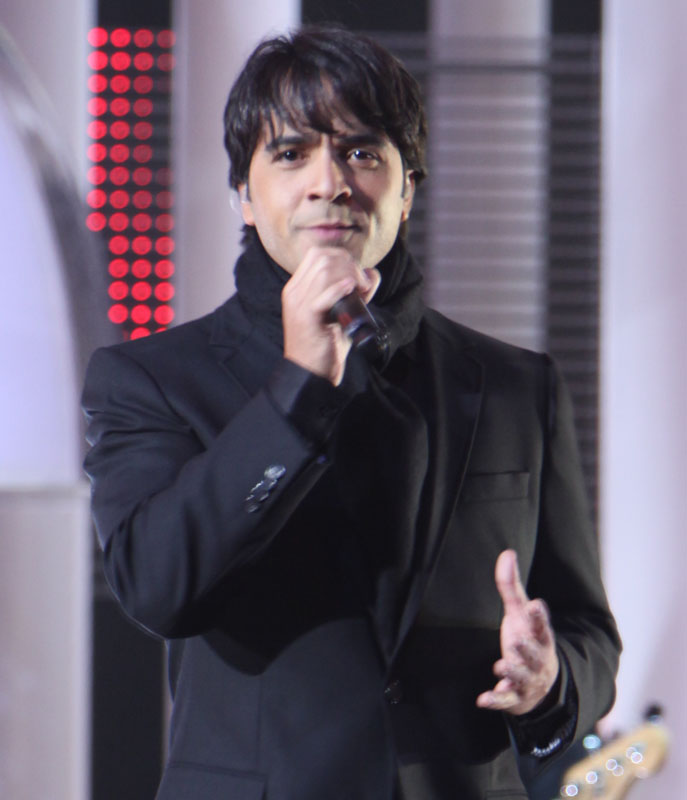
Puerto-Rican singer Luis Fonsi was awarded in 2009 for the song "Aquí Estoy Yo".

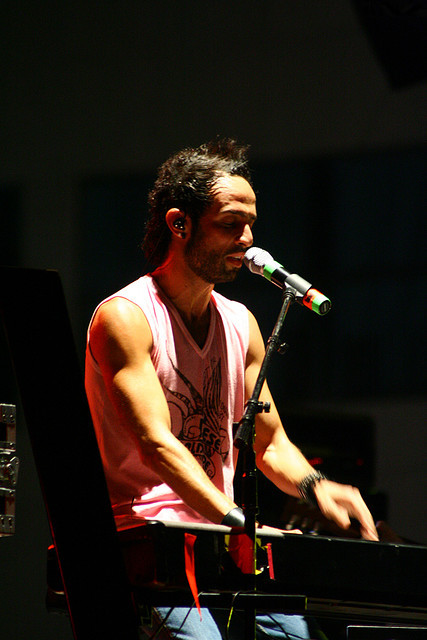
Mexican artist Mario Domm of Camila won in 2010 for the song "Mientes".

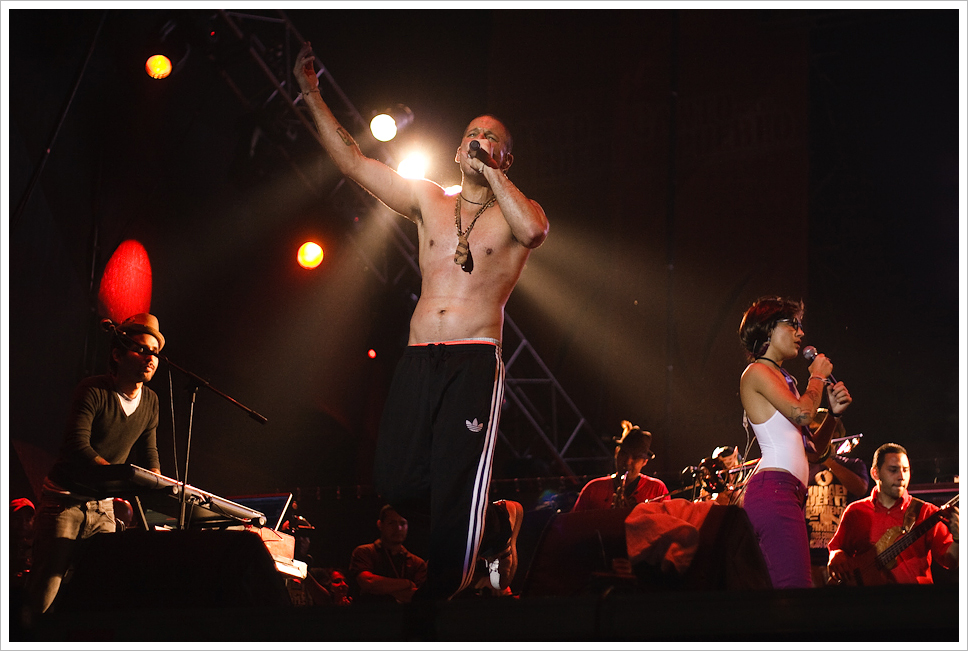
Puerto Rican band Calle 13, 2011 winners for the song "Latinoamérica".

== See also ==
- Grammy Award for Song of the Year
