= Latin Grammy Award for Best Pop Album by a Duo or Group with Vocal =

Music award category

Latin Grammy Award for Best Pop Album by a Duo or Group with Vocals
- Awarded for: recordings of the pop genre by duos or groups
- Country: United States
- Presented by: The Latin Recording Academy
- First award: 2001
- Final award: 2011
- Website: latingrammy.com

The Latin Grammy Award for Best Pop Album by a Duo or Group with Vocals was an honor presented annually at the Latin Grammy Awards between 2001 and 2011.The award was given to duos or groups for albums containing at least 51% of new recordings of the pop genre. In 2000 an award known as Best Pop Performance by a Duo/Group with Vocal was presented. From 2001 to 2011 the award for Best Pop Album by a Duo or Group with Vocals was presented.

Award-winning albums have been recorded by Mexican artists more than any other nationality, though they have also been released by musicians or groups originating from Spain and the United States. Bacilos and Sin Bandera are the most awarded bands in the category with two wins (out of three nominations) each; currently both ensembles are disbanded. Spanish trio Presuntos Implicados hold the record for most nominations without a win, with three, and Mexican band RBD and Spanish bands Amaral, Estopa and Jarabe de Palo had two unsuccessful nominations. The last winner of this category was given to supergroup Alex, Jorge y Lena for their eponymous 2010 album.

== Recipients ==
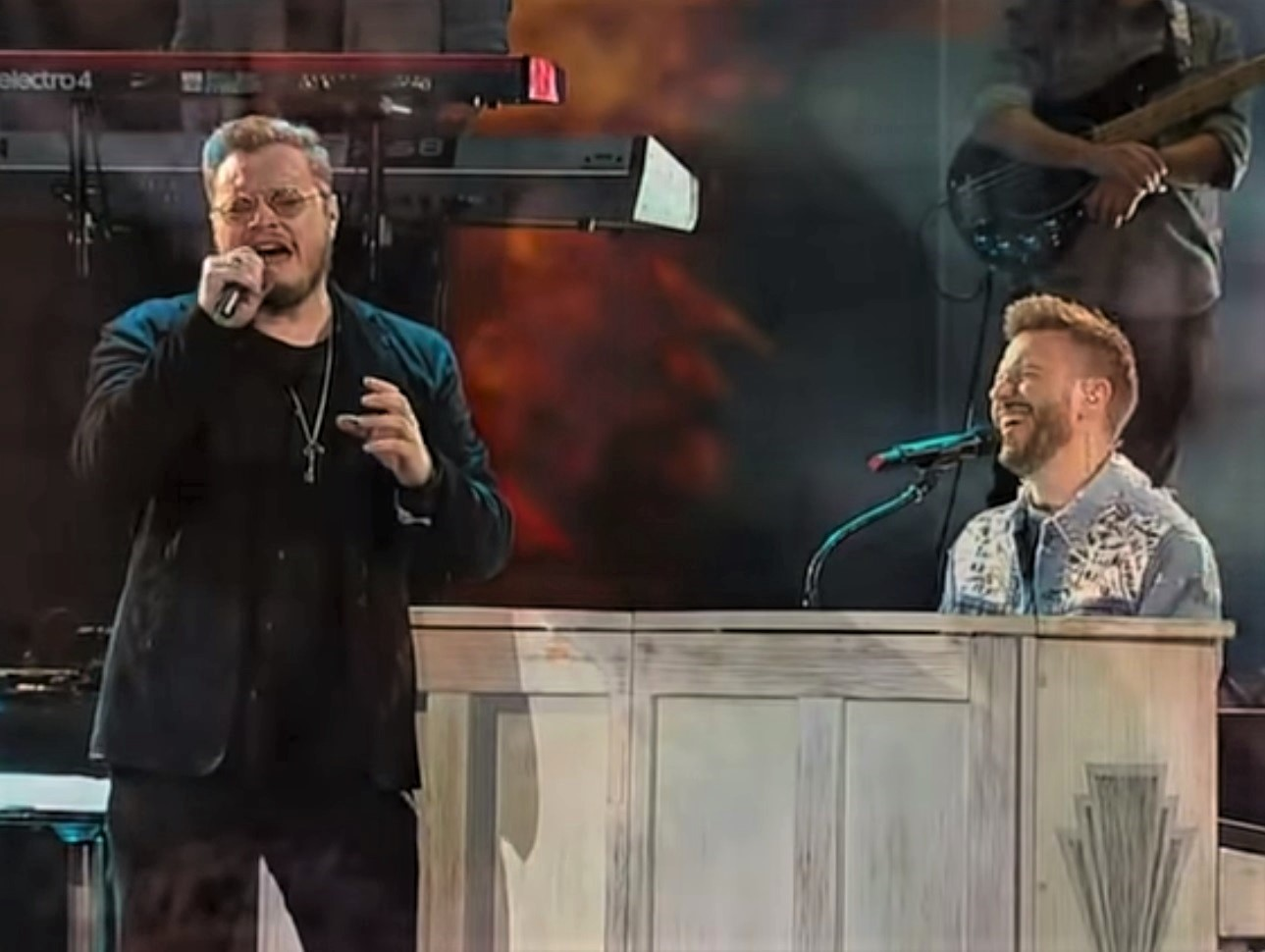
Mexican-Argentine duo Sin Bandera won the award twice, in 2002 and 2004.

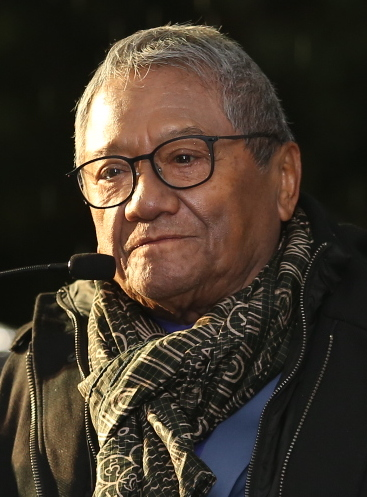
Mexican musician Armando Manzanero won the award alongside various artists for the album Duetos.

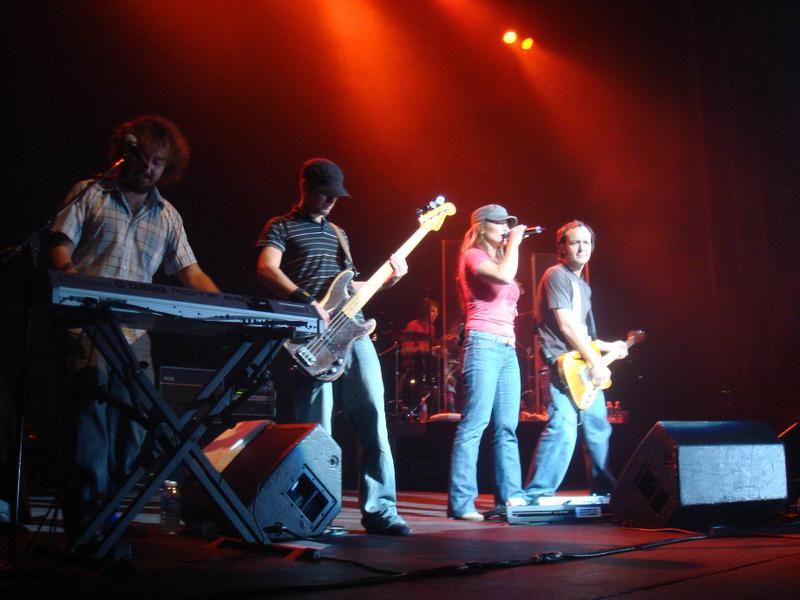
Spanish band La Oreja de Van Gogh won in 2006 for Guapa.

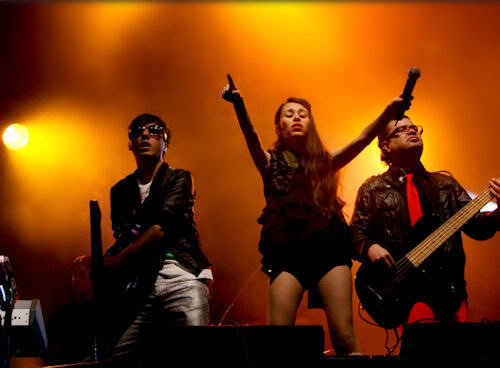
Mexican band Belanova won in 2008 for Fantasía Pop.

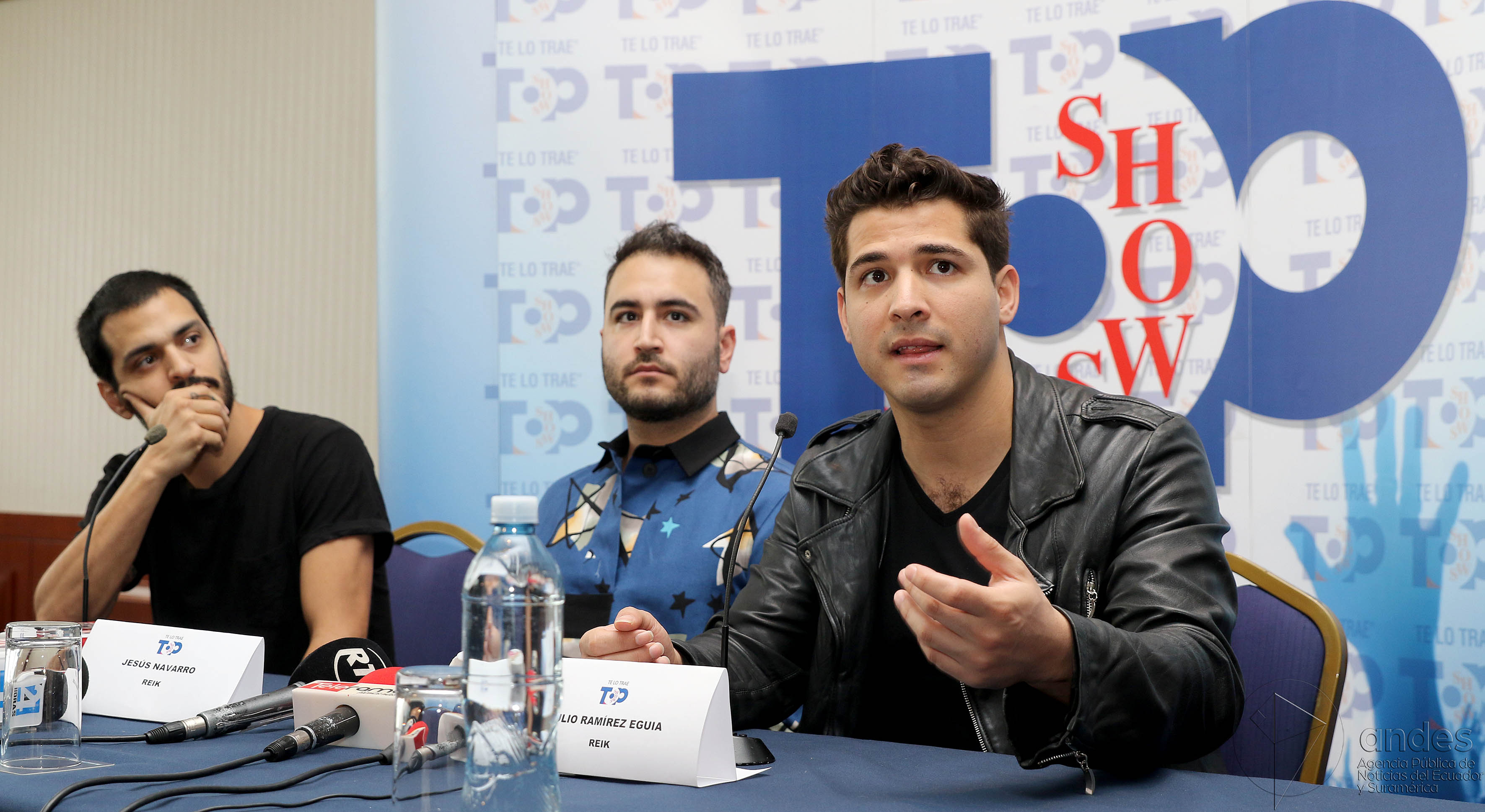
Mexican band Reik won in 2009 for Un Día Más

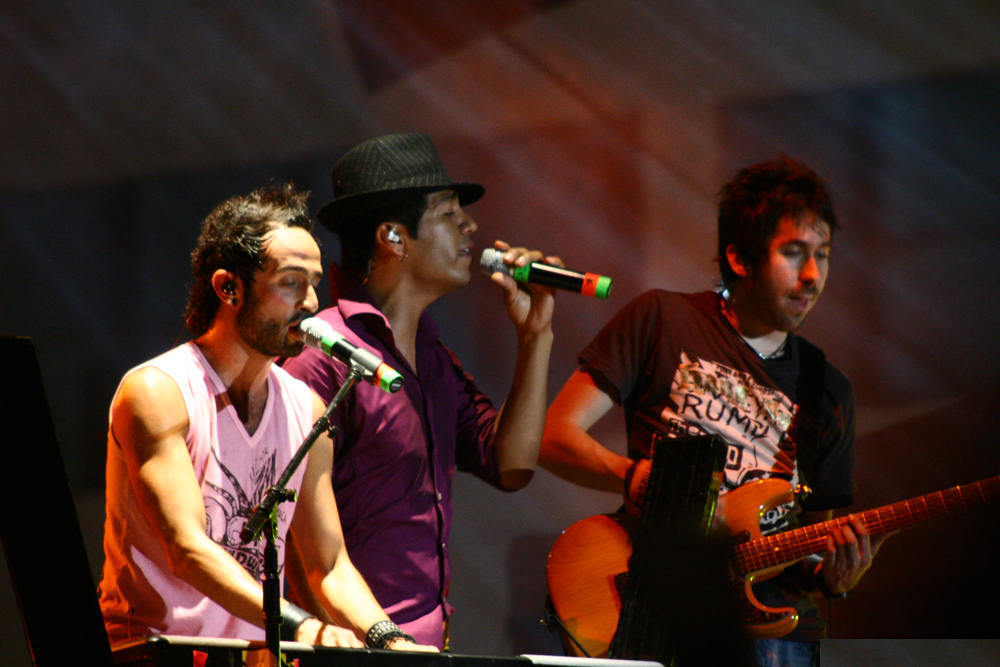
Mexican band Camila, winners in 2010 for the album Dejarte de Amar

=== 2000s ===
| Year^{[I]} | Performing artist(s) | Work | Nominees | Ref. |
|---|---|---|---|---|
| 2000 | Maná | "Se Me Olvidó Otra Vez" | Ketama – "Miénteme"; Jennifer Lopez and Marc Anthony – "No Me Ames"; Só Pra Contrariar and Gloria Estefan – "Santo Santo"; Andreas Vollenweider and Milton Nascimento – "Cor Do Amor" | |
| 2001 | Armando Manzanero and various artists | Duetos | Bacilos – Bacilos; Ella baila sola – Marta y Marilia; Ana Torroja and Miguel Bosé – Girados en Concierto; Chucho Valdés and Irakere – Unforgettable Boleros | |
| 2002 | Sin Bandera | Sin Bandera | Amaral – Estrella de Mar; Mamma Soul – Fe; Presuntos Implicados – Gente; Supernova – Retráctate | |
| 2003 | Bacilos | Caraluna | Ilegales – Marca Registrada; Ketama – Dame la Mano; Las Ketchup – Las Hijas del Tomate; Kumbia Kings – 4 | |
| 2004 | Sin Bandera | De Viaje | Area 350 – Hay Que Cambiar; Estopa – ¿La calle es tuya?; La Oreja de Van Gogh – Lo Que te Conté Mientras te Hacías la Dormida; Los Tri-O – Canciones del Alma de Marco Antonio Solís | |
| 2005 | Bacilos | Sinvergüenza | Amaral – Pájaros en la Cabeza; Andy & Lucas – Desde Mi Barrio; Elefante – Elefante; Presuntos Implicados – Postales | |
| 2006 | La Oreja de Van Gogh | Guapa | Belanova – Dulce Beat; La Quinta Estación – Acústico; RBD – Nuestro Amor; Servando y Florentino – Servando y Florentino; Sin Bandera – Mañana | |
| 2007 | La Quinta Estación | El Mundo Se Equivoca | Jarabe de Palo – Adelantando; Jesse & Joy – Esta Es Mi Vida; Miranda! – El Disco de Tu Corazón; Porpartes – Sólo Paz | |
| 2008 | Belanova | Fantasía Pop | Hombres G – 10; Kudai – Nadha; Kumbia All Starz – Planeta Kumbia; RBD – Empezar Desde Cero | |
| 2009 | Reik | Un Día Más | Jarabe de Palo – Orquesta Reciclando; La Oreja de Van Gogh – A las cinco en el Astoria; La Quinta Estación – Sin Frenos; Presuntos Implicados – Será | |

=== 2010s ===
| Year^{[I]} | Performing artist(s) | Work | Nominees | Ref. |
|---|---|---|---|---|
| 2010 | Camila | Dejarte de Amar | Estopa – X Anniversarium; Jotdog – Jotdog; Los Claxons – Los Claxons; Taxi – Aquí y Ahora | |
| 2011 | Alex, Jorge y Lena | Alex, Jorge y Lena | Belanova – Sueño Electro I; Il Volo – Edición en Español; Río Roma – Al Fin Te Encontré; Siam – Siam | |

^{^[I]} Each year is linked to the article about the Latin Grammy Awards held that year.

== See also ==
- Grammy Award for Best Pop Performance by a Duo or Group with Vocals
- Latin Grammy Award for Best Female Pop Vocal Album
- Latin Grammy Award for Best Male Pop Vocal Album
- Latin Grammy Award for Best Contemporary Pop Vocal Album
- Latin Grammy Award for Best Traditional Pop Vocal Album
