= Mi Primer Millón =

Single by Bacilos

from the album Caraluna
- Released: December 9, 2002
- Length: 3:57
- Label: WEA International
- Songwriters: Sergio George and Jorge Villamizar

Bacilos singles chronology
"Caraluna" (2002)	"Mi Primer Millón" (2002)	"Odio el Silencio" (2003)

"Mi Primer Millón" (My First Million) is the second single of the album Caraluna by band Bacilos written by Sergio George and Jorge Villamizar. The song won the Latin Grammy Award for Best Tropical Song in 2003.

== Chart performance ==
Chart (2002)	Peak position
US Hot Latin Songs (Billboard)	18
US Latin Pop Airplay (Billboard)	18
