= X Anniversarium =

Studio album by Estopa
- Released: November 17, 2009
- Genres: Rumba, Latin rock
- Language: Spanish
- Labels: Sony, BMG

Estopa chronology
Allenrok (2008)	X Anniversarium (2009)

X Anniversarium is the seventh studio album by the Spanish band Estopa. It was released in 2009, marking the band's ten-year anniversary. Additionally a comic of the band was released called Ultimate Estopa, as well as a poster of the band and a flag of their first concert as a gift. The album received a Latin Grammy nomination for Best Pop Album by a Duo or Group with Vocals

== Track listing ==
=== CD 1 ===
No.	Title	Length
1.	"El run run" (featuring Rosario)	3:25
2.	"Fuente de energía" (featuring El canto del loco)	4:10
3.	"No quiero verla más" (featuring Macaco)	3:17
4.	"Tu calorro" (featuring Muchachito Bombo Infierno)	3:47
5.	"Ya no me acuerdo" (featuring Ana Belén)	2:49
6.	"Cacho a cacho" (featuring Rosendo)	3:11
7.	"Era" (featuring Joan Manuel Serrat)	3:18
8.	"Cuerpo triste" (featuring Ojos de Brujo)	3:31
9.	"Demonios" (featuring El Bicho)	4:20
10.	"Como Camarón" (featuring Joaquín Sabina)	3:22
11.	"Luna lunera" (featuring Chambao)	4:04
12.	"El del medio de los Chichos" (featuring Los Chichos)	3:47
13.	"Tan solo" (featuring Albert Pla)	4:57

=== CD 2 ===
No.	Title	Length
1.	"Hemicraneal" (Remixed by Carlos Jean)	4:42
2.	"Cuando amanece" (Remixed by Nigel Walker)	3:26
3.	"Cuando cae la luna" (Remixed by Fernando Montesinos)	3:19
4.	"Me falta el aliento" (Remixed by Fernando Illán)	3:47
5.	"Vino tinto" (Remixed by Bori Alarcón)	3:14
6.	"La raja de tu falda" (Remixed by Alejo Stivel)	3:23
7.	"Exiliado en el lavabo" (Remixed by Leiva (Pereza))	3:42
8.	"Malabares" (Remixed by Javier Limón)	3:45
9.	"Pastillas de freno" (Remixed by Eugenio Muñoz)	4:39
10.	"Descatalogando" (Remixed by Tino di Geraldo)	4:21
11.	"Era" (Remixed by Suso Saiz)	4:18

== DVD ==
The first DVD contains 24 video clips of the band, including live performances.

The second DVD called Regreso a la española is a documentary of the band narrated by their friends the band member José and David, and was directed by Andreu Buenafuente. The DVD also contains their first live performance (December 2, 2000) on the Palacio de Deportes de la Comunidad de Madrid.

1. La raja de tu falda
2. Como Camarón
3. Cacho a cacho
4. Tu calorro
5. Suma y sigue
6. Me falta el aliento
7. El del medio de los chichos
8. Vino tinto
9. Partiendo la pana
10. Demonios
11. Nasío pa la alegría
12. Rumba triste
13. Fuente de energía
14. Pastillas de freno
15. Tragicomedia
16. Ya no me acuerdo
17. Vacaciones
18. No quiero verla mas
19. Lunes
20. Malabares
21. Cuando amanece
22. Cuerpo triste
23. Hemicraneal
24. Pesadilla

== Certification ==
Region	Certification	Certified units/sales
Spain (Promusicae)	2× Platinum	120,000^{^}
^{^} Shipments figures based on certification alone.
