= Andrés Cabas =

Cabas
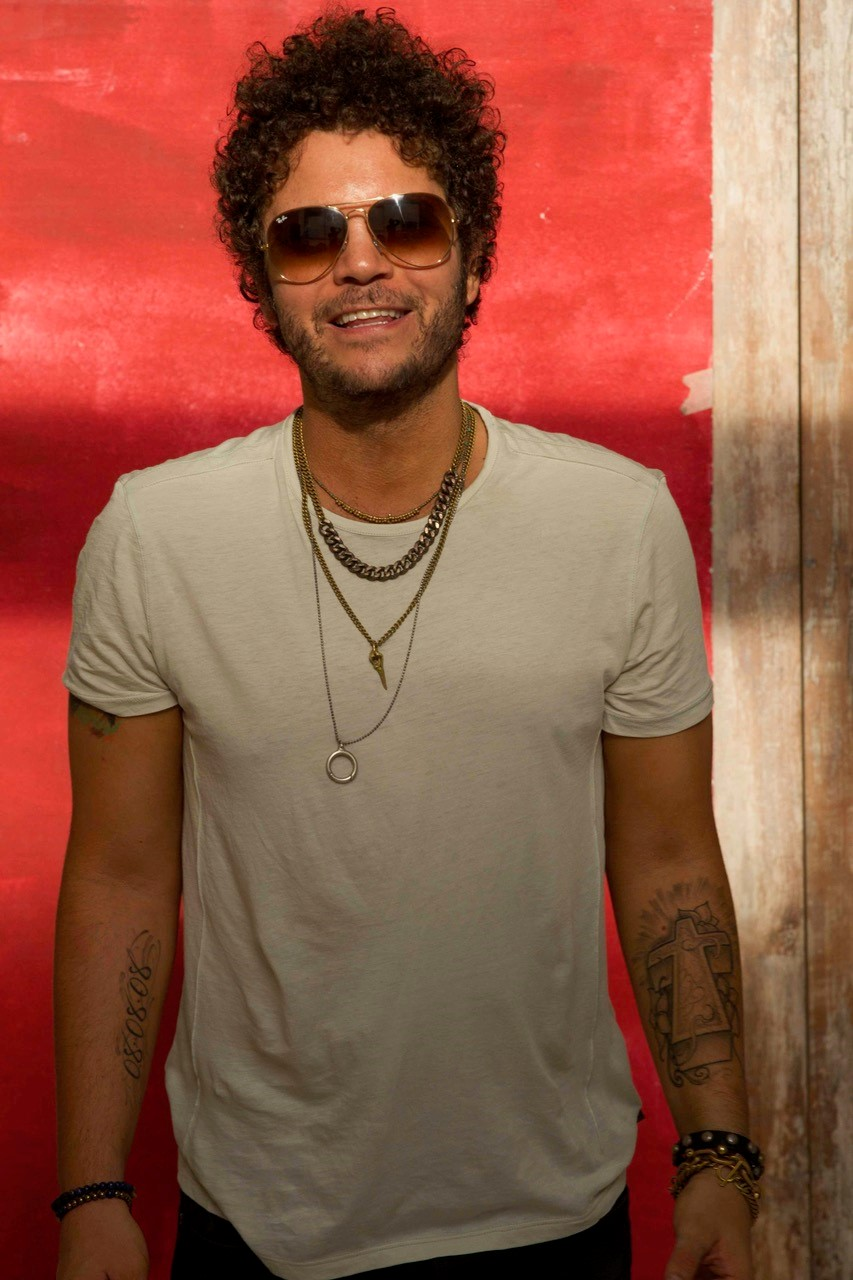

Background information
- Born: Andrés Mauricio Cabas Rosales; 7 October 1976 (age 49)
- Origin: Barranquilla, Colombia
- Genres: Cumbia, Tropical, Latin, Latin pop, Latin rock
- Years active: 2000–present
- Labels: EMI, APM, Indie
- Website: www.cabasmusica.com

Andrés Mauricio Cabas Rosales (born October 7, 1976), known as Cabas, is a Colombian musician. He mixes pop, latin, rock and local Colombian music to create his own musical style.

== Biography ==
Andrés Cabas was born on 7 October 1976, in Barranquilla, Colombia. His father, Eduardo Cabas, is a musician and composer. Cabas' formal education on the piano and percussion started while still a child. As a young adult, Cabas traveled first to Paris and later to New York where he met and played with jazz and salsa musicians. Upon his return to Colombia he dug into his country's rhythms and explored a new wave of sound widely known in Latin music at the time. He represented Colombia in the OTI Festival 1997 with the song "Mis amigos".

His first self-titled album, "Cabas" (EMI), was released in 2000. "Mi Bombón" ("My Candy") topped the country's charts for three consecutive months, earning him Gold and double Platinum discs before spreading to the rest of Latin-America and Mexico. Two other singles from the album also topped the charts, not only in Colombia but throughout the Americas; "Ana Maria" and "Tu Boca".

In March 2002, "Cabas" was released in the United States, where it received reviews in Billboard magazine. and The New York Times. He made the New York Times "Best Of" list at the end of 2003.

He was nominated for Best Rock Album and Best Rock Interpretation. At the MTV Latin Awards he was nominated for Best Rock Album, Best Rock Interpretation, the People's Prize, and Best Rock Video for the Lo Nuestro Awards.

=== Children's Music ===
In 2009, Cabas joined forces with renowned theater, Film & TV director Jorge Ali Triana for an adaptation of Mario Vargas Llosa's "Pantaleón y las visitadoras". He composed the music for this original version, which earned him the Accede Prize of Theatrical Journalism in New York. He composed music for children in association with scientist and economist Gunter Pauli for the ZERI Foundation. Gunter Pauli is known for his charitable and philanthropic contributions, and his music has been used in movies, on TV and in commercials around the globe.

=== Collaborations ===
Over the years, Cabas has performed with artists like Lenny Kravitz, Shakira and Miguel Bosé. He has produced and co-produced with Kike Santander, December Bueno, Carlos Jean, collaborated with the Black Eyed Peas, Café Tacuba, Dave Matthews, Bunbury, Orishas, Vicentico, La Mala Rodríguez, Andrés Calamaro, Juan Luís Guerra and Ximena Sariñana among many others. His music has been featured in commercials around the world and his videos have amassed tens of millions of views on YouTube.

=== Present ===
In June 2013, Cabas released "Que Prenda La Moto" ('The Engine Starts'). The song quickly became a top 10 hit in Colombia. He also released a duet with up-and-coming singer Duina del Mar, "Besarte La Boquita" ("Kissing Your Little Mouth"), on Universal Music Latino.

In late 2015, Cabas released the single "Enamorandonos" (APM) in Colombia and later Ecuador. The single went straight to the top of the charts in both countries, receiving extensive radio play. A video was released in February 2016 and has amassed nearly 50 million plays. "Enamorandonos" was released to much success in Mexico in August 2016 and was included in the trailer for the Mexican hit movie "Treintona, Soltera y Fantástica" ('Thirty-ish, Single and Fabulous') starring Barbara Mori. Azteca TV included the song as the main theme for their show; Enamorándonos, which launched in November 2016 and has since moved to Azteca’s main channel 13.

In May 2017, Cabas released his first ballad, "Tanto Que Te Amo Tanto," co-written and produced with Colombian producer José Gaviria. The song about missing someone very close and dear, was written for his then 8-year-old son Simon. Cabas followed his first ballad with his first Cumbia-Reggaeton infused fusion single, "Rompe Los Niveles," co-written with hit writer Descemer Bueno of "Baillando" fame. "Rompe Los Niveles" was released in July 2017, immediately inspired a storm of fans. In August 2017, Cabas performed the song for the first time live at the VIBRA Bogota radio TYM Festival in front of 15,000 plus people. The music video for "Rompe Los Niveles," a major production directed by the Spanish directing team Javi Rojo and Fini Mazza and shot in Miami, was launched at the end of September 2017.

In May 2018, Cabas released his first ever English language song; "To Stay". It is the result of his fans' strong appeal for an English version of the hit ballad; "Tanto Que Te Amo Tanto". "To Stay" was also co-written and produced with José Gaviria in Miami. In the first few days of its release, Cabas' "To Stay" made Spotify’s Baladas Románticas playlist.

"Tanto Que Te Amo Tanto" was followed by "Valiente," a reggaeton infused pop song in 2018. Cabas opened the Central American Games in Barranquilla, with Miss Universe 2015 Paulina Vega and Shakira. That same year, he closed the Colombian soccer season.

Starting in May 2022, Cabas released a series of singles and a new album. The first single, Amor Y Traicion, was written and produced with Grammy winning producer George Noriega and his team at the Cutting Cane studios in Miami and mixed by Luis Barrera Jr. Mastered by – Francisco Holzmann. The single was accompanied by an animated video created in Argentina by Federico and Nicolas Raiman. In 2021, Cabas released "Divina" an anthem to the city of Bogotá, "Trato Y No Consigo", which speaks about the importance of family and includes a music video featuring his son, Simón, and "Solos Ft. Martina La Peligrosa" a seductive single with Colombian actress and singer, Martina La Peligrosa, which has reached the #6 spot in Colombian's music charts.

"Hard to imagine in these strange times, but the best is still to come!"- Cabas

== Discography ==
=== Cabas (November 2002) ===
- "Susurro" ("Whisper")
- "Himno a la Mamita" ("Anthem to the Pretty Lady")
- "Mala Hierba" ("Bad Grass")
- "Mi Bombón" ("My Bombon")
- "Juancho"
- "Tu Boca" ("Your Mouth")
- "Ana María"
- "Jincho" ("Drunk")
- "Fandango Viejo" ("Old Fandango")
- "...Se llama Cumbia" ("...It's called Cumbia")
- "La Cantaleta" ("The Babble Sing")
- "Fiesta de Tambores" ("Festival of the Drums")
- "Colombia Tierra Querida" ("My Dear Colombia ")
- "A Veces Soy Feliz" ("Sometimes I'm Happy")

=== Contacto (September 2003) ===
- "La Caderona" ("The Big-Hipped Woman")
- "Golpe Negro" ("Black Hit")
- "Declaración del Bizco" ("Declaration of the Lazy-eyed")
- "Bolita de Trapo" ("Little Rug Ball")
- "Contacto" ("Contact")
- "Patasarriba" ("Upside down")
- "Adentro" ("Inside")
- "Arrastraíto" ("Dragged")
- "Confía" ("Trust")
- "La Conquista" ("The Conquest")
- "Puerto Jabalí" ("Wild Boar Port")
- "Monocuco
- "El Peregrino" ("The Pilgrim")
- "Cosa Sabrosa" ("Tasty Thing")
- "Machuca" ("Squish")
- "Primer Amor" ("First Love")

=== Puro Cabas (September 2005) ===
- "Intro"
- "Guacamaya" ("Macaw")
- "La Cadena de Oro" ("The Golden Chain")
- "Poseído" ("Possessed")
- "Vámonos de Aquí" ("Let's Get Away from Here")
- "Increíble" ("Incredible")
- "La Quejosa" ("The Whiner")
- "Llega la Noche" ("The Night Arrives")
- "Salvaje" ("Wild")
- "Caribe Soy" ("I am Caribbean")
- "Likua" ("Blend")
- "Chiles Rellenos"
- "¿Quién Dijo Que No?" ("Who Said No")

=== De la Sombra a la Luz (September 2006) ===
- "Guacamaya" ("Macaw")
- "La Cadena de Oro" ("The Golden Chain")
- "Poseído" ("Possessed")
- "Vámonos de Aquí" ("Let's Go Away from Here")
- "Increíble" ("Incredible")
- "La Quejosa" ("The Whiner")
- "Llega la Noche" ("The Night Arrives")
- "Salvaje" ("Wild")
- "Caribe Soy" ("I am Caribbean")
- "Likua" ("Blend")
- "Chiles Rellenos" ("Stuffed Chiles")
- "¿Quién Dijo Que No?" ("Who Said No")
- "Amor de Mis Amores"
- "Soñar No Cuesta Nada"
- "Cuando Tu Cariño"

=== Amores Difíciles (February 2008) ===
- "No Dejo de Pensar en Ti" ("I Never Stop Thinking About You")
- "Bonita" ("Beautiful")
- "Como Nuestro Amor No Hay Dos" ("There is No Love Like Ours")
- "He Pecado" ("I've Sinned")
- "Hoy Que Te Vas" ("Now That You're Leaving")
- "Maleta Sin Fondo" ("Bottomless Suitcase")
- "Amores Difíciles" ("Difficult Love")
- "Donde" ("Where")
- "La Niña Alicia" ("The Little Girl Alicia")
- "Apaga la Luz" ("Turn off the Light")
- "Futuros Recuerdos" ("Future Memories")

=== Pantaleón y las visitadoras (January 2010) ===
- "El teniente ejemplar" ("The Exemplary Lieutenant")
- "La pinga loca" ("Crazy Penis")
- "Los pantalones de Pantaleón" ("Pantaleón's Pants")
- "Supermarket"
- "Soldaditos de plomo" ("Toy Soldiers")
- "La tienda del amor (instrumental)" ("Love's store" (instrumental))
- "Oda a Pantaleón" ("Ode to Pantaleón")
- "La amenaza del Sinchi" ("Sinchi's Threat")
- "El himno del batallón" ("The Battalion's Anthem")
- "Adiós, hasta luego" ("Goodbye, until later")
- "Las pesadillas de Pantaleón" ("Pantaleón's Nightmares")
- "Te has vuelto ciego por la Brasileña" ("You've Gone Blind for the Brazilian")
- "La muerte de la Brasileña" (instrumental) ("The Brazilian's Death" (instrumental))
- "Despedida de Pantaleón" ("Pantaleón's Farewell")
- "El teniente ejemplar" reprise ("The Exemplary Lieutenant" reprise)

=== Si Te Dijera... (September 2011) ===
- "Si Te Dijera" ("If I Told You")
- "Despues de la Lluvia" ("After the Rain")
- "Irreversible" ("Irreversible")
- "La Kalora" ("The Karola")
- "Por Una Mujer" ("For a Woman")
- "Lo Que Dejamos Atras" ("What We leave Behind")
- "Somos Dos" ("We are Two")
- "Tanta Belleza" ("So Much Beauty")
- "Dime Que Te Vas" ("Tell me you are Going")
- "Facil" (Easy)
- "Tranquilo" ("Calm")

=== Singles... ===
- "Soledad" (2011 - Andres Cabas / Fonseca (Fonseca's Album))
- "Que Prenda la Moto" (2013)
- "Besarte La Boquita" (2013 - Duina del Mar feat. Cabas)
- "Enamorándonos" (2015)
- "Tanto Que Te Amo Tanto" (2017)
- "Rompe Los Niveles" (2017)
- "To Stay" (2018)
- "Valiente" (2019)
- "Amor y Traición" (2020)
- "Divina" (2021)
- "Trato Y No Consigo" (2021)
- "Solos" Ft. Martina La Peligrosa (2021)

== Awards and nominations ==
=== Latin Grammy Awards ===
A Latin Grammy Award is an accolade by the Latin Academy of Recording Arts & Sciences to recognize outstanding achievement in the music industry. Cabas has received an award from six nominations.

Year	Nominee / work	Award	Result
2002	Cabas	Best New Artist	Nominated
2006	Puro Cabas	Best Contemporary Tropical Album	Nominated
2006	"La Cadena de Oro"	Best Tropical Song	Nominated
2008	"Bonita"	Record of the Year	Nominated
2009	Pombo Musical	Best Latin Children's Album	Won
2010	"Sueño Contigo" (Tecupae featuring Cabas)	Best Tropical Song	Nominated
