= Bacilos =

American band

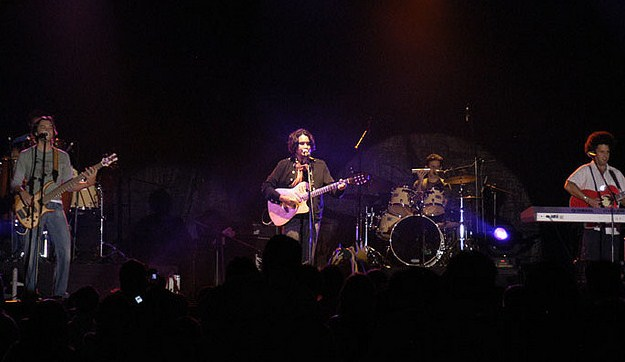
- Bacilos performing in Guatemala

Background information
- Origin: Miami, Florida, U.S
- Genres: Latin pop, Folk music
- Years active: 1997–2007; 2017–present
- Labels: Sonolux, WEA International, Warner Music Group, Sony Music Latin
- Members: Jorge Villamizar; André Lopes
- Past members: José Javier Freire
- Website: bacilos.com

Bacilos is a Latin pop duo currently consisting of Jorge Villamizar and André Lopes. They have released 7 albums and 2 EPs. Their album Caraluna (2002) won the 2003 Grammy Award for Best Latin Pop Album, and their album Sin Vergüenza (2004) was nominated in 2005 for the same award. They have achieved success with the singles "Mi Primer Millón" and "Caraluna".

The band's name was originally Bacilos Búlgaros, a literal translation of bacilli, named after a home remedy touted by Villamizar's grandmother. It is also a play on the Spanish language word "vacilón," meaning a fun, good time.

Although based in Miami, Villamizar considers the band to be a "Latin American band," and the band has had several number one hits in Latin America.

== History ==
In 1997, while a student at the University of Miami, Jorge Villamizar, a Colombian singer and guitarist, formed the band with fellow students André Lopes, a Brazilian bassist, and José Javier Freire, a Puerto Rican percussionist, after receiving a positive reception from playing a guitar outside of classes. Originally a quartet, they released an independent album, Madera, in 1999.

They first played at student bars, parties, and on campus before expanding to small venues in Miami and Miami Beach.

In early 2000, Bacilos signed with Warner Music Group, and in May 2000, they released the self-titled album, Bacilos. It was nominated for two Latin Grammy Awards and received an RIAA certification of gold in Colombia. The single Tabaco Y Chanel was nominated for a Latin Grammy Award.

The band was the opening act for Alejandro Sanz in June 2002. In July 2002, they released Caraluna, which featured textured arrangements and violin by Pedro Alfonso. It won a Grammy for the best Latin pop album and the best album by a duo or group with vocals at the Latin Grammy Awards. It had also been nominated for the best album at the Latin Grammy Awards, but lost to Juanes' album, Un Día Normal. The single Caraluna reached number 16 on the Hot Latin Charts in late 2002. The song Mi Primer Millón, a humorous account of trying to make it in the music industry, reached number 18 on the Hot Latin Charts in February 2003 and won the Latin Grammy Award for Best Tropical Song.

In November 2003, Bacilos collaborated on an album with Celso Piña and performed on the song "Bésala Ya".

Sin Verguenza, recorded in Brazil and Miami, was released in September 2004. It was produced by Tom Capone and Juan Vicente Zambrano. The first single, Pasos de Gigante, reached number 8 on the Hot Latin singles charts in November 2004, and number 1 in Argentina and number 2 in Chile in December 2004. It was nominated for a Grammy Award for best Latin Pop Album.

In July 2005, they were featured on Late Night With Conan O'Brien.

In late 2006, the band announced that they would break up after their show on February 22, 2007, at the Viña del Mar International Song Festival in Chile. Villamizar then launched a solo career.

In October 2017, the band reunited. That year, they released the song "Por Hacerme el Bueno". In August 2018, the band released their fourth studio album "¿Dónde Nos Quedamos?".

In April 2021, the band released their fifth studio album, "Abecedario," which includes two re-recorded hits, Caraluna featuring Carlos Vives, and Tobacco y Chanel with Morat.

In 2021, José Javier Freire retired from the group.

In May 2024, the band released Pequeños Romances, a collection of Villamizar's previous compositions and re-recordings from his solo career.

== Artistry and influences ==
The band drew influences from Cuban folk singer Silvio Rodríguez and Argentinian rock singer Fito Páez. Their music has been described as a "fusion of Caribbean rhythms, South American folklore, pop melodies and rock aggressiveness".

== Discography ==
=== Albums ===
- Madera (1999)
- Bacilos (2000)
- Caraluna (2002)
- Sin Vergüenza (2004)
- ¿Dónde Nos Quedamos? (2018)
- Abecedario (2021)
- Pequeños Romances (2024)

=== EPs ===
- Cupido y Compañía (2020)
- Toca madera (2022)

== Awards and nominations ==
=== Grammy Awards ===
Year	Nominee / work	Award	Result
2005	Sin Vergüenza	Best Latin Pop Album	Nominated
2003	Caraluna	Best Latin Pop Album	Won

=== Latin Grammy Awards ===
Year	Nominee / work	Award	Result
2001	Bacilos	Best New Artist	Nominated
2001	Bacilos	Best Pop Album by a Duo or Group with Vocals	Nominated
2003	Caraluna	Album of the Year	Nominated
2003	"Mi Primer Millón"	Record of the Year	Nominated
2003	"Mi Primer Millón"	Song of the Year	Nominated
2003	"Caraluna"	Song of the Year	Nominated
2003	Caraluna	Best Pop Album by a Duo or Group with Vocals	Won
2003	"Mi Primer Millón"	Best Tropical Song	Won
2005	Sin Vergüenza	Best Pop Album by a Duo or Group with Vocals	Won
