= Bacilos (album) =

Studio album by Bacilos
- Released: May 23, 2000
- Recorded: July 1999 – March 2000
- Genre: Latin pop
- Length: 43:23
- Label: WEA International

Bacilos chronology
Bacilos (2000)	Caraluna (2002)

Bacilos is the first studio album recorded by Bacilos released on May 23, 2000. The album received a Latin Grammy Award nomination for Best Pop Album by a Duo or Group with Vocals.

== Track listing ==
This information adapted from Allmusic.

No.	Title	Writer(s)	Length
1.	"Manchados de Amor"	Villamizar	4:31
2.	"Tabaco y Chanel"	Villamizar	5:10
3.	"Besela Ya"	Villamizar	3:17
4.	"Soledad"	Villamizar	4:13
5.	"Cuestion de Madera"	Villamizar	5:05
6.	"Lo Mismo Que Yo" (feat. string arrangements by David Campbell)	Villamizar	3:27
7.	"Cronica"	Villamizar	5:26
8.	"Ahi Va la Madera"	Villamizar	4:34
9.	"Mas Alla"	Peterson, Villamizar	3:11
10.	"Como Querer"	Villamizar	4:29
