= La llave de mi corazón (song) =

"La Llave de Mi Corazón"

Single by Juan Luis Guerra

from the album La Llave de Mi Corazón
- Released: January 22, 2007
- Recorded: 2006–2007
- Studio: Circle House Studios (Miami, Florida); Chocolab Midi Studios; JLG Studios (Santo Domingo, Dominican Republic)
- Genre: Merengue · Mambo
- Length: 3:14
- Label: EMI Televisa Music
- Songwriter: Juan Luis Guerra
- Producer: Juan Luis Guerra

Juan Luis Guerra singles chronology
"Bendita Tu Luz" (2006)	"La Llave de Mi Corazón" (2007)	"Qué Me Des Tu Cariño" (2007)

"La Llave de Mi Corazón (English: "The Key of My Heart") is a 2007 hit song from Juan Luis Guerra that has won numerous Latin awards.

== Song information ==
The key of my heart written by Juan Luis Guerra is a Latin pop song from 2007, but with a focus on decades of the 50th. Though the song is primarily written in Spanish, several parts of the lyrics are written in English. In the song, a man meets his match maker online even they do not have too much in common and wonders what he should do when he meets her thus opening "the key to his heart".

== Music video ==
The lead female character in the video is played by actress Zoe Saldaña.

== Chart performance ==
Chart (2007–09)	Peak position
Chile (EFE)	5
Ecuador (Los 40)	2
Nicaragua Airplay (EFE)	2
US Bubbling Under Hot 100 (Billboard)	14
US Radio Songs (Billboard)	66
US Latin Rhythm Songs (Billboard)	34
Billboard Hot Latin Tracks	1
Billboard Latin Tropical Airplay	1
Billboard Latin Regional Mexican Airplay	33

== Awards and nominations ==
Latin GRAMMY Awards

Year	Nominated work	Award	Result
2008	"La Llave de Mi Corazón"	Record of the Year	Won
2008	"La Llave de Mi Corazón"	Song of the Year	Won
2008	"La Llave de Mi Corazón"	Best Tropical Song	Won

2008 Latin Billboard Music Awards

Year	Nominated work	Award	Result
2008	"La Llave de Mi Corazón"	Tropical Airplay Song of the Year by Duo or Group	Nominated

== Versions ==
- La Llave de Mi Corazón (Album Version)
- Medicine For My Soul (English Version)
- La Llave de Mi Corazón-(featuring Taboo)
- Ao Chave do Meu Coração-(Portuguese Version)
