= 4th Annual Latin Grammy Awards =

Music awards presented Sept 2003

4th Latin Grammy Awards
- Official poster
- Date: September 3, 2003
- Venue: American Airlines Arena, Miami, Florida
- Hosted by: George Lopez

Highlights
- Person of the Year: Gilberto Gil

Television/radio coverage
- Network: CBS

The 4th Annual Latin Grammy Awards were held in Miami at the American Airlines Arena on Wednesday, September 3, 2003. It was the first time the telecast was held outside of Los Angeles. Juanes was the night's biggest winner winning a record five awards including Album of the Year. He tied his own record winning five awards again five years later in 2008. Juan Luis Guerra and Calle 13 also tied this record in 2007 and 2009 respectively.

== Awards ==
Winners are in bold text.

=== General ===
Record of the Year

Juanes — "Es Por Ti"

- Bacilos — "Mi Primer Millón"
- Luis Miguel — "Hasta Que Vuelvas"
- Molotov — "Frijolero"
- Tribalistas — "Já Sei Namorar"

Album of the Year

Juanes — Un Día Normal

- Bacilos — Caraluna
- Rubén Blades — Mundo
- Alexandre Pires — Estrella Guía
- Tribalistas — Tribalistas

Song of the Year

Juanes — "Es Por Ti"

- Jorge Villamizar — "Caraluna" (Bacilos)
- Natalia Lafourcade — "En El 2000"
- Sergio George and Jorge Villamizar — "Mi Primer Millón" (Bacilos)
- Franco De Vita — "Tal Vez" (Ricky Martin)

Best New Artist

David Bisbal

- Tiziano Ferro
- Natalia Lafourcade
- Fernanda Porto
- Álex Ubago

=== Pop ===
Best Female Pop Vocal Album

Olga Tañón — Sobrevivir

- Gisselle — En Alma, Cuerpo y Corazón
- Ednita Nazario — Acústico
- Thalía — Thalía
- Ana Torroja — Frágil

Best Male Pop Vocal Album

Enrique Iglesias — Quizás

- Ricardo Arjona — Santo Pecado
- David Bisbal — Corazón Latino
- Alexandre Pires — Estrella Guía
- Joan Manuel Serrat — Versos En La Boca

Best Pop Album by a Duo/Group with Vocals

Bacilos — Caraluna

- Ilegales — Marca Registrada
- Ketama — Dame La Mano
- Las Ketchup — Hijas del Tomate
- A.B. Quintanilla & Los Kumbia Kings — 4

Best Pop Instrumental Album

Bajofondo Tango Club — Bajofondo Tango Club

- Raúl di Blasio — Di Blasio-Gardel Tango
- Orquestra Simfònica de Barcelona I Nacional de Catalunya — Historia Sinfonica del Pop Español
- Spam Allstars — ¡Fuacata! Live
- Néstor Torres — Mi Alma Latina

=== Rap/Hip-Hop ===
Best Rap/Hip-Hop Album

Orishas — Emigrante

- Big Boy — The Phenomenon
- Tego Calderón — El Abayarde
- Dante — Elevado
- El General — El General De Fiesta
- Vico C — Emboscada

=== Rock ===
Best Rock Solo Vocal Album

Juanes — Un Día Normal

- Gustavo Cerati — Siempre es hoy
- Charly García — Influencia
- Natalia Lafourcade — Natalia Lafourcade
- Luis Alberto Spinetta — Obras En Vivo

Best Rock Album by a Duo/Group with Vocals

Maná — Revolución de Amor

- Jaguares — El Primer Instinto
- Jarabe de Palo — Bonito
- Molotov — Dance and Dense Denso
- Los Rabanes — Money Pa' Que

Best Rock Song

Juanes — "Mala Gente"

- Beto Cuevas and Humberto Gatica — "Amate y Salvate" (La Ley)
- Natalia Lafourcade — "En El 2000"
- Paco Ayala, Randy Ebright and Miguel Huidobro — "Frijolero" (Molotov)
- Shakira — "Te Aviso, Te Anuncio (Tango)"

=== Tropical ===
Best Salsa Album

El Gran Combo de Puerto Rico — 40 Aniversario En Vivo

- Oscar D'León — Infinito
- La India — Latin Song Bird: Mi Alma y Corazón
- Víctor Manuelle — Le Preguntaba A La Luna
- Gilberto Santa Rosa — Viceversa

Best Merengue Album

Milly Quezada — Pienso Así...

- Elvis Crespo — Urbano
- Grupo Manía — Latino
- Los Hermanos Rosario — Swing A Domicilio
- Kinito Méndez — Sigo Siendo El Hombre Merengue

Best Contemporary Tropical Album

Rubén Blades — Mundo

- Charanga Habanera — Live In The USA
- Ry Cooder and Manuel Galbán — Mambo Sinuendo
- Juan Formell and Los Van Van — En El Malecón De La Habana
- Monchy y Alexandra — Confesiones...

Best Traditional Tropical Album

Ibrahim Ferrer — Buenos Hermanos

- The Mambo All Stars Orchestra — 50 Years of Mambo
- Polo Montañez — Guitarra Mía
- Eliades Ochoa — Estoy Como Nunca
- Plena Libre — Mi Ritmo

Best Tropical Song

Sergio George and Jorge Villamizar — "Mi Primer Millón" (Bacilos)

- Elvis Crespo — "Bandida"
- Sergio George and Jorge Luis Piloto — "La Salsa Vive" (Tito Nieves)
- Kike Santander — "Por Más Que Intento" (Gilberto Santa Rosa)
- Ray Contreras, Jimmy Greco, La India and Shirley Marte — "Sedúceme" (La India)

=== Regional Mexican ===
Best Ranchero Album

Vicente Fernández — 35 Aniversario — Lo Mejor de Lara

- Pepe Aguilar — Y Tenerte Otra Vez
- Rocío Dúrcal — Rocío Dúrcal... En Concierto Inólvidable
- Alejandro Fernández — Niña Amada Mía
- Pedro Fernández — De Corazón

Best Banda Album

Joan Sebastian — Afortunado

- Banda Centenario — Homenaje a un Amigo
- Banda el Recodo — No Me Sé Rajar
- Banda Machos — Banda Machos
- Cuisillos de Arturo Macias — ...No Voy a Llorar

Best Grupero Album

Atrapado — ¿Qué Sentiras?

- Alondra — Alondra
- Ivan Díaz — Historias
- Límite — Soy Así
- Jennifer Peña — Libre

Best Tejano Album

Jimmy González & El Grupo Mazz — Si Me Faltas Tu

- Jaime & Los Chamacos — Conjunto Power
- Emilio Navaira — Acuérdate
- Jay Perez — Hombre En La Luna
- Ruben Ramos & The Revolution — El Gato Negro On The Prowl

Best Norteño Album

Los Terribles del Norte — La Tercera Es La Vencida... Eso!

- Juan Acuña & El Terror del Norte — Pa' Toda Mi Raza...Eso!
- Conjunto Primavera — Perdoname Mi Amor
- Los Tucanes de Tijuana — Jugo A La Vida
- Pesado — No Te La Vas A Acabar!

Best Regional Mexican Song

Joan Sebastian — "Afortunado"

- A.B. Quintanilla and Alicia Villarreal — "Ay! Papacito" (Límite)
- Jimmy González — "Dame Un Minuto" (Jimmy González & El Grupo Mazz)
- Noe Hernández, Alfonso Lizárraga and Joel Lizárraga — "Las Vías Del Amor" (Banda el Recodo)
- Ramón González Mora — "Perdóname Mi Amor" (Conjunto Primavera)

=== Traditional ===
Best Folk Album

Mercedes Sosa — Acústico

- Alex Acuña and Eva Ayllón with Los Hijos Del Sol — To My Country
- Eva Ayllón — Eva
- Los Muñequitos de Matanzas — Rumba De Corazón
- Raíces Habaneras — Raíces Habaneras

Best Tango Album

Sexteto Mayor — Homenaje A Piazzolla

- Adrián Iaies Trio — Las Cosas Tienen Movimiento
- Adriana Nano y Los Bandoneones de Buenos Aires — Adriana Nano y Los Bandoneones de Buenos Aires
- Orquesta Del Tango De La Ciudad De Buenos Aires — En Vivo En El Colón
- Susana Rinaldi — La Rosa En Ginebra
- Leo Sujatovich — Trío De Cámara Tangos

Best Flamenco Album

Pepe de Lucía — El Corazón De Mi Gente

- Juan Carmona — Orillas
- Diego El Cigala with Niño Josele — Teatro Real De Madrid
- Carmen Linares with Gerardo Núñez Trio — Un Ramito De Locura
- José Mercé — Lío
- Victor Monge Serranito with Camerata Romeu — Sueños De Ida y Vuelta
- Various Artists — Gerardo Núñez Presenta La Nueva Escuela De Guitarra Flamenca

=== Jazz ===
Best Latin Jazz Album

Paquito D'Rivera — Brazilian Dreams

- Alex Acuña and Justo Almario with Tolú — Bongó De Van Gogh
- Gato Barbieri — The Shadow of the Cat
- Eddie Palmieri — La Perfecta II
- Esperança Hermeto Pascoal E Grupo — Mundo Verde
- Chucho Valdés — Fantásia Cubana

=== Christian ===
Best Christian Album

Marcos Witt — Sana Nuestra Tierra

- Patty Cabrera — Amar A Alguien Como Yo
- Funky — Funkytown
- Annette Moreno & Jardín — Un Ángel Llora
- Perucho — Almas Unidas

=== Brazilian ===
Best Brazilian Contemporary Pop Album

Tribalistas — Tribalistas

- Gilberto Gil — Kaya N'Gan Daya - Ao Vivo
- Kid Abelha — Acústico MTV
- Milton Nascimento — Pietá
- Caetano Veloso — Live in Bahia

Best Brazilian Rock Album

Os Paralamas do Sucesso — Longo Caminho

- Capital Inicial — Rosas e Vinho Tinto
- Charlie Brown Jr. — Bocas Ordinárias
- CPM 22 — Chegou a Hora de Recomeçar
- Cássia Eller — Dez de Dezembro
- Nação Zumbi — Nação Zumbi

Best Samba/Pagode Album

Alcione — Ao Vivo

- Leandro Braga — Primeira Dama - A Música de Dona Ivone Lara
- Teresa Cristina and Grupo Semente — A Música de Paulinho da Viola
- Martinho da Vila — Voz e Coração
- Jair Rodrigues — Intérprete

Best MPB Album

Caetano Veloso and Jorge Mautner — Eu Não Peço Desculpa

- Maria Bethânia — Maricotinha ao Vivo
- João Bosco — Malabaristas do Sinal Vermelho
- Dori Caymmi — Contemporâneos
- Gal Costa — Gal Bossa Tropical
- Elza Soares — Do Cóccix Até o Pescoço

Best Sertaneja Music Album

Zezé di Camargo & Luciano — Zezé di Camargo e Luciano

- Bruno & Marrone — Minha Vida Minha Musica
- Chitãozinho & Xororó — Festa do Interior
- Edson & Hudson — Acústico ao Vivo
- Gian & Giovani — Gian and Giovani
- Milionário & José Rico — O Dono do Mundo
- Comitiva Brasil — 100% Sertanejo

Best Brazilian Roots/Regional Album

Dominguinhos — Chegando de Mansinho

- Fafá de Belém — O Canto das Águas
- Elomar, Pena Branca, Renato Teixeira, Teca Calazans and Xangai — Cantoria Brasileira
- Olodum — Pela Vida
- Pena Branca — Pena Branca Canta Xavantinho

Best Brazilian Song

Milton Nascimento and Telo Borges — "Tristesse" (Milton Nascimento and Maria Rita)

- Herbert Vianna — "Cuide Bem do Seu Amor" (Os Paralamas do Sucesso)
- Arnaldo Antunes, Carlinhos Brown and Marisa Monte — "Já Sei Namorar" (Tribalistas)
- Chico Amaral — "Pietá" (Milton Nascimento)
- Jorge Mautner — "Todo Errado" (Caetano Veloso and Jorge Mautner)

=== Children's ===
Best Latin Children's Album

Xuxa — Só Para Baixinhos 3

- Cómplices Al Rescate — Cómplices Al Rescate: El Gran Final
- Beatriz Contreras, Lila Jaramillo and Orlando Sandoval — Carta Al Niño Dios
- Tatiana — Los Mejores Temas de las Películas de Walt Disney
- Various Artists — Canciones de Gozo Para Niños

=== Classical ===
Best Classical Album

Paquito D'Rivera — Historia del soldado

- Jordi Savall and Capella Reial de Catalunya — Biber: Requiem Á 15 Battalia Á 10
- Maria Teresa Madeira — Ernesto Nazareth 2 - Mestres Brasileiros Vol IV
- Ángeles Blancas, Plácido Domingo, Elisabete Matos, García Navarro, Àngel Òdena, Stefano Palatchi, and María Rey-Joly — Margarita La Tornera ....
- Kronos Quartet — Nuevo

=== Production ===
Best Engineered Album

Benny Faccone and Paul McKenna — Revolución de Amor (Maná)

- Mike Couzzi and Sebastian Krys — Money Pa' Que (Los Rabanes)
- Walter Flores, Oscar Marín, Daniela Pastore and Edín Solís — Mundo (Rubén Blades)
- William Jr., Antoine Midani and Alê Siqueira — Tribalistas (Tribalistas)
- Rolando Alejandro, Dominic Barbera, Jon Fausty, Brian Kinkead, José Lugo, Arturo Ortiz, Rei Peña, Pedro Rivera Toledo and Ronnie Torres — Viceversa (Gilberto Santa Rosa)

Producer of the Year

Bebu Silvetti

- Sergio George
- Guto Graça Mello
- Luis Fernando Ochoa
- Gustavo Santaolalla

=== Music video ===
Best Music Video Molotov — "Frijolero"

- Ricardo Arjona — "El Problema"
- Chayanne — "Torero"
- Roberto Frejat — "Segredos"
- Jarabe de Palo — "Bonito"
