= Sin Vergüenza (Bacilos album) =

Studio album by Bacilos
- Released: September 28, 2004
- Genre: Latin pop
- Label: WEA International
- Producer: Sergio George, Bacilos, Luis Fernando Ochoa

Bacilos chronology
Caraluna (2002)	Sin Vergüenza (2004)	Grandes Exitos (2006)

Sin Vergüenza (Shameless) is the third studio album recorded by Bacilos released on September 28, 2004. The album won the Latin Grammy Award for Best Pop Album by a Duo or Group with Vocals.

== Track listing ==
This information adapted from Allmusic.

No.	Title	Writer(s)	Length
1.	"Sangre Americana"	Villamizar	3:49
2.	"El Algun Recuerdo"	Villamizar	4:05
3.	"Pasos de Gigante"	Villamizar	3:56
4.	"Porque Brillamos"	Villamizar	3:49
5.	"La Mexicana"	Villamizar	3:26
6.	"En los 70"	Villamizar	4:05
7.	"Miro la Luna y Pienso en Ti"	Villamizar	4:19
8.	"Colores, Colores"	Villamizar	4:14
9.	"Guerras Perdidas"	Villamizar	4:34
10.	"Feliz Conmigo"	Villamizar	3:11
11.	"La Olla"	Villamizar	4:14
12.	"Un Regalo"	Freire, Lopes	2:17
