= Jorge Villamizar =

Colombian singer

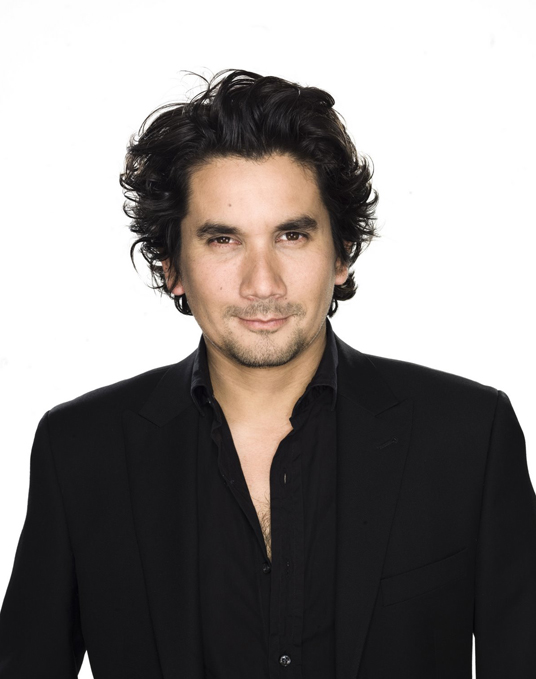
- Born: Jorge Alberto Villamizar Iregui; 14 October 1970 (age 55); Montería, Colombia
- Occupations: Singer; songwriter; musician
- Musical career
- Genre: Latin Pop
- Instruments: Vocals; guitar; piano; percussion
- Years active: 1992–present
- Member of: Bacilos; Alex, Jorge y Lena
- Website: www.jorgevillamizar.com

Jorge Alberto Villamizar Iregui (born 14 October 1970) is a Colombian musician, singer, and composer, leader of the band Bacilos, and one of the most representative Latin American singers. Villamizar came to prominence as the lead member of the band Bacilos. Bacilos released their album Madera in 1999, and in 2000, they recorded their first album with Warner Music, which was nominated for a Latin Grammy award for Best New Artist. Caraluna (2002) was released and won a Grammy Award for Best Latin Pop Album, and Villamizar was awarded a Latin Grammy for Best Tropical Song for the second single "Mi Primer Millón". The album Sin Vergüenza won a Latin Grammy and the track "Pasos de Gigante" became the band's only top ten single in the Billboard Top Latin Songs, which peaked at number eight. Bacilos disbanded in 2007 Villamizar was made his debut solo album in 2008. Villamizar has written and co-written songs with Marc Anthony, Obie Bermúdez, Julieta Venegas, El Burro y Esteban, and Paulina Rubio.

He has lived in Miami since 1992.

== Life and career ==
As an artist and musician, Jorge Villamizar is popular across the Americas and the Caribbean. A 6-time Grammy winner, Villamizar is successful as a solo artist and as frontman of the latin pop group, Bacilos.

Jorge Villamizar was born in Montería, Colombia, and was raised in Ecuador. His mother taught him to play the guitar and to appreciate an eclectic array of music that ranged from The Beatles to Andean folk music. These childhood influences, paired with the experiences that he would go on to live as a young man, shaped him into the dangerously creative and talented musician he is today.

At 19, after spending one year serving in the Colombian Navy, Jorge moved to London, England looking to flourish artistically in the immense musical scene. He found himself deeply rooted in Latin music and for the next two years Villamizar would make it as a "Busker" (street performer), making the streets, markets and nightclubs his stage. London was a pivotal time for the young singer-songwriter; it was the place where he fell in love for the first time and where he composed one of the biggest songs in his career, "Tabaco y Chanel" (Tobacco and Chanel).

Looking to internationalize his music, Jorge moved to Miami in the 90's, a true music metropolis still to date. While finishing his studies at the University of Miami, the artist teamed up with the Puerto Rican, Jose Javier Freire and Brazilian, André López to form the group, Bacilos. Stemming from the overwhelming popularity in their hometown, Bacilos quickly became a staple in Latin music on an international level. Their first album, Bacilos (2000), delivered the hit song "Tabaco y Chanel" and two Latin Grammy nominations. The band's sophomore production, Caraluna (2002), delivered the hits "Caraluna" and "Primer Millón", two Latin Grammy award and one Grammy Award, among other recognitions. Continuing their successful run, the third album, Sinvergüenza (2004) delivered the hit "Pasos de Gigante" and the band's fourth career Grammy award’ it was truly a remarkable run. Bacilos dismantled at the peak of their success after 12 years, and their last performance at the 2007 "Viña Del Mar" music festival was memorable and emotional.

Early in his songwriting career, Villamizar wrote songs for artists including Alejandra Guzman ("Algo Natural") and Marc Anthony ("Vivir"). He later collaborated with musicians such as Julieta Venegas, Descemer Bueno, Isaac Delgado, and Mane de la Parra. His compositions also include songs recorded by Paulina Rubio ("Alma en Libertad") and Luis Enrique ("Yo No Se Mañana"), the latter which received the Latin Grammy Award for Best Tropical Song in 2009.

One year after Bacilo's breakup, Jorge Villamizar emerges as a solo artist, ready to continue the musical legacy he had created. Since then, he's release the albums "Jorge Villamizar" (2008), produced by Richard Blair; "Alex Jorge Lena" (2011), a special project in which Villamizar collaborated with colleagues Lena Burke and Alex Ubago; and his most recently released, "El Dia Que Vuelva" (2015), produced by Sergio George. The album contains various collaborations with artists such as Oscar de León and is in fact a collection of songs written during the Bacilos era. The album delivered the No. 1 hit single "Dificil" and gained Villamizar the chance to win his seventh career Grammy award, which he plans to take home this November in Las Vegas.

The artist is currently acting as a coach on Ecuador's edition of the highly popular talent competition, "The Voice." Jorge is also set to release a new single in November. He also continues to compose for known, and sometimes unknown, artists.

Since his time in London, Jorge Villamizar has continued to perform across Latin America, the United States, and the Caribbean.

== Current projects ==
His new single featuring Elvis Crespo, Maluma, and J.D.B. "Te Vivi" combines the infectious rhythms of the Caribbean, Andean, and urban music. The music video was filmed in La Comuna 13 in Medellin, Colombia, a community that has overcome many difficulties and thrive with the promotion of culture, music and dance. The location and the people featured in the music video are truly representative of the liveliness and colour of Latin America. The Colombian artist currently resides in Miami, Florida, and is part of several social work organizations like WildAid and Musicians On Call .

== Bacilos ==
The group Bacilos was signed by Warner Music, under which they produced and released the albums Bacilos (2000,) Caraluna (2002,) and Sin Verguenza (2004.) Among their biggest hits are "Tabaco and Chanel", "Caraluna", "Mi Primer Millon", "Pasos de Gigante", among others. In 2007 they performed their last show at the Festival of Viña del Mar. Nevertheless, the end of Bacilos marked a new stage in the career of Jorge Villamizar as a solo artist. His first solo project entitled "Jorge Villamizar" is a collection of autobiographical songs that reflect the bohemian life and encouraging nature of the Colombian singer. In 2010 he won his sixth Grammy for the hit "Estar Contigo" with Lena Burke and Alex Ubago, who pooled their talents to collaborate in a record production.

== Awards ==
Bacilos won a Grammy in 2002 for Best Latin Pop Album (for "Caraluna"). They won three Latin Grammys: Best Pop album in 2005 (for "Sin Vergüenza") and Best Pop Album in 2003 (for "Caraluna") as well as Best Tropical song in 2003 (for "Mi Primer Millon" which came from the album Caraluna).
