= Caraluna =

Studio album by Bacilos
- Released: July 16, 2002
- Genre: Latin pop
- Label: WEA International
- Producer: Sergio George, Bacilos, Luis Fernando Ochoa

Bacilos chronology
| Bacilos (2000) | Caraluna (2002) | Sin Vergüenza (2004) |

Caraluna (Moonface) is the second studio album recorded by Bacilos released on July 16, 2002. The album won the Latin Grammy Award for Best Pop Album by a Duo or Group with Vocals in 2003.

== Track listing ==
This information adapted from Allmusic.

| No. | Title | Writer(s) | Length |
|---|---|---|---|
| 1. | "Mi Primer Millón" | George, Villamizar | 3:57 |
| 2. | "Caraluna" | Villamizar | 4:26 |
| 3. | "Solo un Segundo" | Greco, Villamizar | 3:58 |
| 4. | "Viejo" | Villamizar | 5:07 |
| 5. | "Odio el Silencio" | Villamizar | 3:44 |
| 6. | "Nada Especial" | Villamizar | 3:26 |
| 7. | "Barcelona" | Villamizar | 4:27 |
| 8. | "El Edificio" | Villamizar | 4:09 |
| 9. | "Nada" | Villamizar | 4:42 |
| 10. | "Elena" | Villamizar | 3:20 |
| 11. | "Buena" | Alfonso, Villamizar | 3:45 |

== Charts ==
Chart performance for Caraluna
| Chart (2003) | Peak position |
|---|---|
| US Top Latin Albums (Billboard) | 49 |
| US Latin Pop Albums (Billboard) | 15 |
