= Latin Grammy Award for Album of the Year =

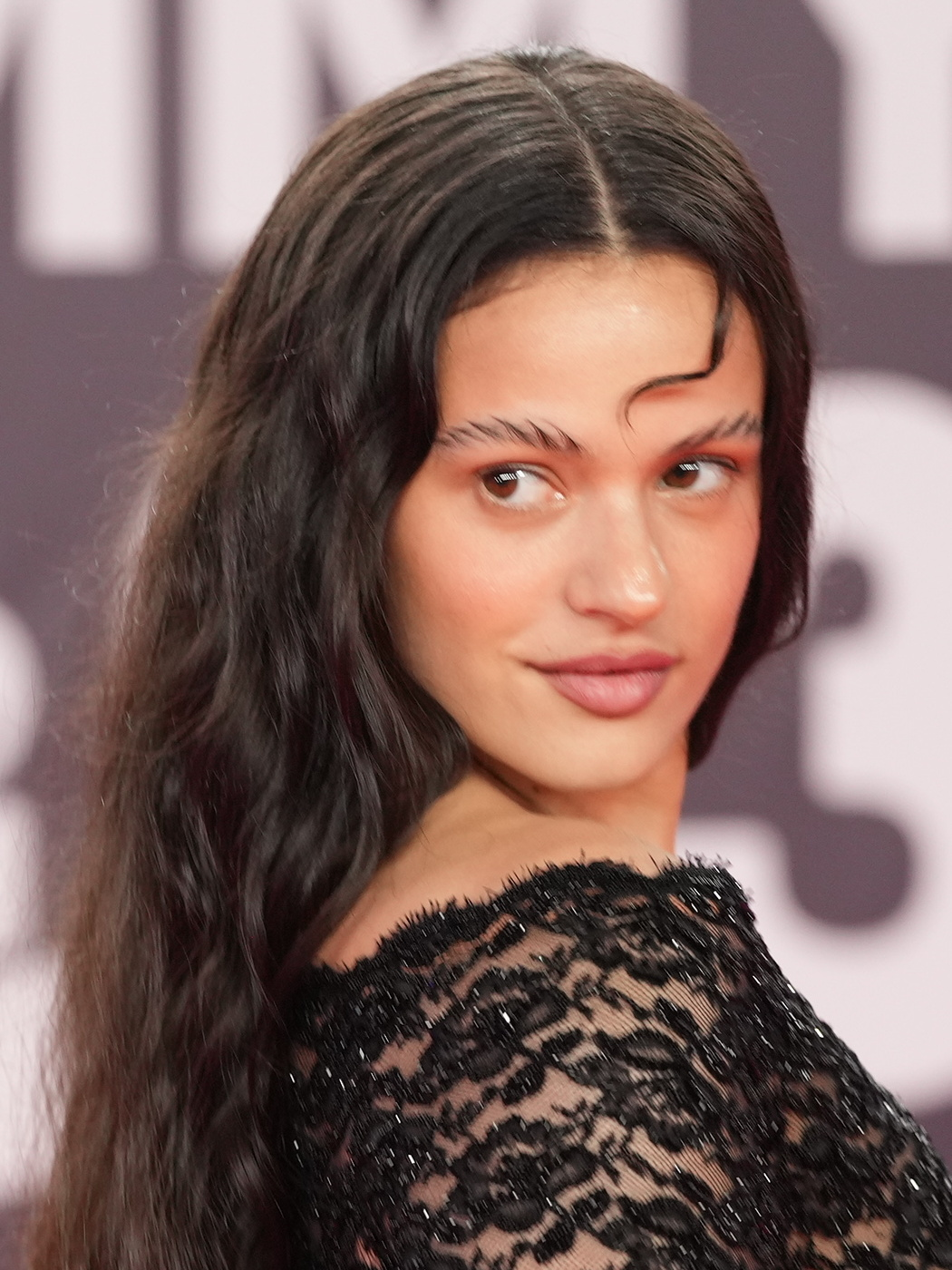
- Lux (Complete Works) by Rosalía is the most recent recipient
- Awarded for: quality vocal or instrumental recorded albums
- Country: United States
- Presented by: The Latin Recording Academy
- First award: 2000
- Currently held by: Lux by Rosalía (2026)
- Website: latingrammy.com (in Spanish, English, and Portuguese)

The Latin Grammy Award for Album of the Year is an honor presented annually at the Latin Grammy Awards, a ceremony that recognizes excellence and creates a wider awareness of cultural diversity and contributions of Latin recording artists in the United States and internationally. The award is given to the performers, producers, audio engineers and mastering engineers for vocal or instrumental albums with 51 percent of new recorded songs. Albums of previously released recordings, such as reissues, compilations of old recordings and greatest hits albums packages are not eligible. Due to the increasing musical changes in the industry, from 2012 the category includes 10 nominees, according to a restructuration made by the academy for the four general categories: Song of the Year, Record of the Year, Best New Artist and Album of the Year. Beginning in 2018, songwriters are eligible for the accolade if 33% of the playing time are composed by them.

Juan Luis Guerra has won the most awards in the category with five wins, including one as a producer. Alejandro Sanz, Juanes and Rosalía follow with three awards, while Calle 13 and Luis Miguel with two. Sanz has also received the most nominations with 9 nominations, followed by Juanes and Natalia Lafourcade with 7; and Guerra and Carlos Vives with 6.

Only four female artists have won the award. Shakira was the first female recipient, winning the award in 2006 for Fijación Oral, Vol. 1. Rosalía became the first female artist to win the award twice (2022) and three times (2026). Other female winners are Natalia Lafourcade in 2020 and Karol G in 2023. Lafourcade also leads most nominations among females with 7 and Shakira with 5.

Most nominated albums were recorded in Spanish language, though Djavan, Chico Buarque, Gilberto Gil, Ivan Lins, Maria Rita, Ivete Sangalo, Tribalistas, Caetano Veloso, Xande de Pilares and Liniker have been nominated for albums recorded in Portuguese language, with Lins winning the award in 2005 for Cantando Histórias.

Miguel Bosé is the most nominated performer without a win, with five nominations. Rafael Arcaute, Eduardo Cabra, Gustavo Santaolalla and Residente are the most awarded producers, with two wins each, Ronnie Torres has received the most awards as engineer/mixer, with three wins and Adam Ayan is the most awarded mastering engineer with three victories as well.

Some of the awarded albums have also earned the Grammy Award. No Es lo Mismo and Paraíso Express by Alejandro Sanz, La Vida... Es Un Ratico and MTV Unplugged Deluxe Edition by Juanes; and Vida by Draco Rosa, for Best Latin Pop Album. La Llave de Mi Corazón by Guerra, Salsa Big Band by Rubén Blades with Roberto Delgado & Orquesta for Best Tropical Latin Album. Fijación Oral, Vol. 1 by Shakira, El Mal Querer and Motomami by Rosalía for Best Latin Rock or Alternative Album. ¡México Por Siempre! by Luis Miguel, for Best Música Mexicana Album (including Tejano); Los de Atrás Vienen Conmigo by Calle 13 for Best Latin Urban Album; and Mañana Será Bonito by Karol G for Best Musica Urbana Album.

Bad Bunny's album Debí Tirar Más Fotos which won this award in 2025, has become the first Spanish-language album to win the Grammy Award for Album of the Year in 2026 along with Best Musica Urbana Album and Best Global Music Performance.

== Recipients ==
Year^{[I]}	Winner(s)	Work	Nominees
2000	Luis Miguel · Luis Miguel, producer; · Al Schmitt and Rafa Sardina engineers/mixers	Amarte Es Un Placer	Juan Luis Guerra – Ni Es Lo Mismo Ni Es Igual (Guerra, producer; Carlos Alvarez, Mike Couzzi, Bolivar Gómez, Miguel Hernández, Luis Mansilla, Carlos Ordehl, Eric Ramos, July Ruiz, Eric Schilling, engineers/mixers); Caetano Veloso – Livro (Jaques Morelenbaum, Veloso, producers; Moogie Canazio, engineer/mixer); Carlos Vives – El Amor de Mi Tierra (Emilio Estefan, Juan Vicente Zambrano, producers; Marcelo Añez, Scott Canto, Alfred Figueroa, Javier Garza, Sebastian Krys, Carlos Nieto, Freddy Piñero, Jr., Carlos Santos, Cesar Sogbe, Ron Taylor, engineers/mixers); Shakira – MTV Unplugged (Tim Mitchell, Shakira, producers; Adam Blackburn, Eric Shilling, engineers/mixers)
2001	Alejandro Sanz · Emanuele Ruffinengo, producer; · Joel Numa, Maurizio Biancani, Renato Cantele & Roberto Maccagno, engineers/mixers	El Alma al Aire	Vicente Amigo – Ciudad de las Ideas (Amigo, producer; Boris Alarcón, Antonio Algarrada, Oscar Clavel, Nigel Walker, engineers/mixers); Gilberto Gil – As Canções de Eu Tu Eles (Gil, producer; Vitor Farias, Marcelo Machado, Nas Nuvens, engineers/mixers); Juanes – Fíjate Bien (Gustavo Santaolalla, producer; Aníbal Kerpel, Thom Russo, engineers/mixers); Paulina Rubio – Paulina (Marcello Azevedo, producer; Silvio Richetto, engineers/mixers)
2002	Alejandro Sanz · Humberto Gatica & Kenny O'Brien, producers; · Chris Brooke, Eric Schilling & Humberto Gatica, engineers/mixers	MTV Unplugged	Miguel Bosé – Sereno (Peter Walsh, producer; Alessandro Benedetti, Walsh, engineer/mixer); Celia Cruz – La Negra Tiene Tumbao (Sergio George, Isidro Infante, Johnny Pacheco, producers; Mario de Jesús, Jon Fausty, engineer/mixer); Ivan Lins – Jobiniando (Roberto Menescal, producer; Guiherme Reis, engineer/mixer); Carlos Vives – Déjame Entrar (Vives, Andrés Castro, Emilio Estefan, Sebastian Krys, producers; Javier Garza, Krys, engineers/mixers)
2003	Juanes · Gustavo Santaolalla & Juanes, producers · Aníbal Kerpel, Joe Chiccarelli and Thom Russo, engineers/mixers	Un Día Normal	Bacilos – Caraluna (Sergio George, Bacilos, Luis F. Ochoa, Gonzalo Vazquez, producers; Gustavo Afont, Fausty, Iker Gastraminsa, Jaime Lagueruela, Bob St. John, Eric Schilling, Vasquez, engineer/mixer); Rubén Blades – Mundo (Blades, Walter Flores, Edín Solís, producers; Flores, Oscar Marín, Daniela Pastore, Solís, engineers/mixers); Alexandre Pires – Estrella Guía (Danilo Ballo, Antonio Carmona, Pedro Ferreira, Fernando Illan, Rey Nerio, Rudy Pérez, Pires, Julio Reyes, Emanuele Ruffinengo, Juan Vicente Zambrano, producers; Carlos Álvarez, Alex Angeloni, Danilo Ballo, Bob Benozzo, Andres Bermúdez, Nico Bloise, Gustavo Celis, Roberto "Il Mac" Maccagno, Duda Mello, Freddy Piñero, Jr., Edu Recife, Enrico Romano, Emanuele Ruffinengo, Hector Sagrario, Richard Serotta, Felipe Tichauer, Bruce Weeden, Bruno Zucchetti, engineers/mixers); Tribalistas – Tribalistas (Arnaldo Antunes, Carlinhos Brown, Marisa Monte, Alé Siqueira, producers; Monte, Flavio De Souza, William Jr., Antoine Midani, Siqueira, engineers/mixers)
2004	Alejandro Sanz · Alejandro Sanz & Lulo Pérez, producers · Mick Guzauski, Pepo Sherman and Rafa Sardina, engineers/mixers; · Bob Ludwig, mastering engineer	No Es Lo Mismo	Bebo & Cigala – Lágrimas Negras (Javier Limón, Fernando Trueba, producers; Jim Anderson, Guillaume Cora, Limón, Pepe Loeches, Eric Schilling, engineer/mixer; Alan Silverman, mastering engineer); Café Tacvba – Cuatro Caminos (Café Tacvba, Dave Fridmann, Gustavo Santaolalla, Andrew Weiss, producers; Joe Chiccarelli, Fridmann, Aníbal Kerpel, Tony Peluso, Luis Román, Weiss, engineers/mixers; Tom Baker, mastering engineer); Kevin Johansen – Sur o No Sur (Pelu Romero, Javier Tenenbaum, producers; Osqui Amante, engineer/mixer; Andrés Mayo, mastering engineer); Maria Rita – Maria Rita (Tom Capone, Marco da Costa, Maria Rita, producers; Álvaro Alencar, Capone, engineers/mixers; Ricardo Garcia, mastering engineer)
2005	Ivan Lins · Moogie Canazio, producer · Moogie Canazio, engineer/mixer · Luiz Tornaghi & Moogie Canazio, mastering engineers	Cantando Histórias	Bebe – Pafuera Telarañas (Carlos Jean, producer; José Luis Crespo, Raúl Quílez, engineers/mixers; Crespo mastering engineer); Obie Bermúdez – Todo el Año (Sebastian Krys, Joel Someillan, producers; Mike Couzzi, Javier Garza, Kyrs, Someillan, engineers/mixers; Antonio Baglio, mastering engineer); Intocable – X (Pepe Aguilar, Carlos Cabral Jr., Jason Cano, Alex Espinoza, Chuy Flores, Kinky, Jorge Lares Amaro, René Martínez, Ricardo Muñoz, Sacha Triujeque, producers; Isaías Asbun, Seth Horan Atkins, Carlos Castro, Gilberto Elguezabal, Chuy Flores, René Garza, Norberto Islas, Jorge Lares Amaro, Justin Leah, Marco Ramírez, Jack Sáenz III, Triujeque, engineers/mixers; Don Tyler, mastering engineer); Diego Torres – MTV Unplugged (Torres, Afo Verde, producers; Gustavo Borner, engineers/mixers; Borner, mastering engineer)
2006	Shakira · Gustavo Cerati, Luis F. Ochoa, Lester Méndez & Shakira, producers · Dave Way, Gustavo Celis, Kevin Killen, Mauricio Guerrero, Rob Jacobs & Serban Ghenea, engineers/mixers · Vlado Meller, mastering engineer	Fijación Oral Vol. 1	Gustavo Cerati – Ahí Vamos (Cerati, Tweety González, producers; Héctor Castillo, Uriel Dorfman, González, engineers/mixers; Howie Weinberg, mastering engineer); Chayanne – Cautivo (Gustavo Arenas, Carlos De Yarza, Javier Díaz, John Falcone, Freddy Piñero, Jr., Carlos Ponce, Joel Someillan, René Toledo, producer; Carlos Álvarez, Carlos Bedoya, Javier Garza, Juan Cristóbal Losada, Patricia Masterson, Freddy Piñero, Jr., Mike Rivera, Andrés Saavedra, César Sogbe, Joel Someillan, Woody Woodruff, engineers/mixers; Vlado Meller, mastering engineer); León Gieco – Por Favor, Perdón y Gracias (Gieco, Luis Gurevich, producers; Osqui Amante, Gustavo Borner, engineers/mixers; Tom Baker, mastering engineer); Julieta Venegas – Limón y Sal (Cachorro López, producer; Sebastián Schon, Cesar Sogbe, Coti Sorokin, Matías Sorokin, engineers/mixers; José Blanco, mastering engineer)
2007	Juan Luis Guerra · Juan Luis Guerra, producer · Allan Leschhorn, Luis Mansilla & Ronnie Torres, engineers/mixers · Adam Ayan, mastering engineer	La Llave de Mi Corazón	Miguel Bosé and Various Artists – Papito (Bosé, Carlos Jean, Andres Levin, Sandy McLelland, Nicolas Sorín, producers; Bori Alarcón, Carlos Alvarez, Andy Bradfield, Miguel Bustamante, Gustavo Celis, José Luis Crespo, Dan Duzla, Goodandevil, Carlos Hernández, Levin, Sandy McLelland, Phil Mezzetti, Robert A. Moses, Geof Sanoff, Pepo Scherman, Carl Thiel, engineers/mixers; Nautilus, Milan, mastering engineer); Calle 13 – Residente o Visitante (Juan Campodónico, Antonio "Toy" Hernández, Edgar Abraham Marrero, Panasuyo, Gustavo Santaolalla, Visitante, producers; Felipe Álvarez, Iván Gutiérrez, Ramón Martínez, Edgardo Matta, Carlos Velázquez, engineer/mixer; James Cruz, mastering engineer); Ricky Martin – MTV Unplugged (Tommy Torres, producer; Gustavo Borner, Bob Clearmountain, engineer/mixer; Ted Jensen, mastering engineer); Alejandro Sanz – El Tren de los Momentos (Lulo Pérez, Sanz, producers; Carlos Álvarez, Gustavo Celis, Pérez, Thom Russo, Sanz, Rafa Sardina, Pepo Scherman, engineer/mixer; Stephen Marcussen, mastering engineer)
2008	Juanes · Gustavo Santaolalla, producer · Steve Churchyard, Jorge da Silva, Aníbal Kerpel and Thom Russo, engineers/mixers · Tom Baker, mastering engineer	La Vida... Es un Ratico	Concha Buika – Niña de Fuego (Javier Limón, producer; Oscar Clavel, Melisa Nanni, engineers/mixers; Alan Silverman, mastering engineer); Café Tacvba – Sino (Café Tacvba, Tony Peluso, Gustavo Santaolalla, producers; Emmanuel del Real, Peluso, engineers/mixers; Tom Baker, mastering engineer); Vicente Fernández – Para Siempre (Joan Sebastian, Jesús Rincón Cárdenas, producers; Dennis Parker, engineer/mixer; Parker, mastering engineer); Kany García – Cualquier Día (Guillermo Gil, Pancho Ruíz, Mario Santos, producers; Gil, engineer/mixer; Güicho Gil, mastering engineer)
2009	Calle 13 · Rafael Arcaute, Eduardo Cabra, Ivan Gutiérrez, Edgardo Matta and René Pérez, producers · Rafa Arcaute, Rodrigo Barria, Cesar Dellano, Ivan Gutierrez, Guillermo Mandrafina, Carlos Velazquez, Ramón Martínez and Omar Vivoni, engineers/mixers · James Cruz, mastering engineer	Los de Atrás Vienen Conmigo	Andrés Cepeda – Día Tras Día (Fredy Camelo Salamanca, Cepeda, producers; Toño Castillo, Eduardo De Narváez, Keith Morrison, Javier Soto, engineers/mixers; Mike Fuller, mastering engineer); Luis Enrique – Ciclos (Bob Benozzo, Sergio George, producers; Carlos Álvarez, Juan Mario "Mayito" Aracil, Benozzo, Simone Chivilo, Roberto "II Mac" Maccagno, Andrea Valfre, engineers/mixers; Tom Coyne, mastering engineer); Ivan Lins & The Metropole Orchestra – Regência: Vince Mendoza (Lins, Vince Mendoza, producers; Rich Green, Paul Pouwer, engineers/mixers; Breen, mastering engineer); Mercedes Sosa – Cantora 1 (Popi Spatocco, producer; Gustavo Celis, Matía Cella, Jorge da Silva, Aníbal Kerpel, Sebastián Merlín, Alejandro Saro, Bruno Stehling, engineers/mixers; Ariel Lavignia, mastering engineer)
2010	Juan Luis Guerra · Juan Luis Guerra, producer · David Channing, Rafael Lazzaro, Allan Leschhorn, Luis Mansilla, Janina Rosado, Allen Sides & Ronnie Torres, engineers/mixers · Adam Ayan, mastering engineer	A Son de Guerra	Bebe – Y. (Carlos Jean, producer; José Luis Crespo, Raúl Quilez, engineers/mixers; Ian Cooper, mastering engineer); Miguel Bosé – Cardio (Bosé, Nicolas Sorín, producers; Andy Bradfield, Pepo Scherman, engineers/mixers; Claudio Guissani, mastering engineer); Camila – Dejarte de Amar (Mario Domm, Pablo Hurtado, producers; Gabriel Castañón, Domm, Benny Faccone, Peter Mokran, engineers/mixers; Bernie Grundman, mastering engineer); Alejandro Sanz – Paraíso Express (Tommy Torres, producer; Bob Clearmountain, Steve Churchyard, Mike Couzzi, Lee Levin, Andrés Saavedra, Dan Warner, Torres, engineers/mixers; Ted Jensen, mastering engineer)
2011	Calle 13 · Edgar Abraham & Rafael Arcaute, producers · Felipe Álvarez, Arcaute, John Blais, Eduardo Cabra, David Cárdenas, Ivan Gutierrez, Lee Levin, José Martínez, Ramón Martinez, Edgardo Matta, Daniel Ovie, Carlos Velazquez, G. Castañón, R. Vásquez, Charles Wakeman and Dan Warner, engineers/mixers · James Cruz, mastering engineer	Entren Los Que Quieran	Alex, Jorge y Lena – Alex, Jorge y Lena (Aureo Baqueiro, producer; Nick Baxter, Gustavo Borner, engineers/mixers; Tom Baker, mastering engineer); Franco De Vita – En Primera Fila (David Cabrera, Franco De Vita, producers; Juan Pablo Falluca, Sebastian Krys, engineers/mixers; Mike Couzzi, mastering engineer); Enrique Iglesias – Euphoria (Fernando Garibay, Nesty, Carlos Paucar, RedOne, Mark Taylor, Victor "El Nasi", producers; Kiko Hurtado, Nesty, Rob Orton, Paucar, RedOne, Phil Tann, engineers/mixers; Brian Gardner, mastering engineer); Shakira – Sale el Sol (Josh Abraham, Lukas Burton, Calle 13, Gustavo Cerati, El Cata, John Hill, Lester Méndez, Albert Menéndez, Luis Fernando Ochoa, Oligee, Shakira, producers; Eduardo Bergallo, Michael Brauer, Gustavo Celis, Dave Clauss, Alex Leader, Lester Méndez, Mark Needham, Joel Numa, Andros Rodriguez, Jonathan Shakhovskoy, Ed Williams, engineers/mixers; Stephen Marcussen, mastering engineer)
2012	Juanes · Juan Luis Guerra, producer · Gustavo Borner, engineer/mixer · Gustavo Borner, mastering engineer	MTV Unplugged	Ricardo Arjona — Independiente (Ricardo Arjona, Carlos Cabral "Junior", Lee Levin & Dan Warner, producers; Carlos Cabral "Junior", Julio Chávez, Isaías García, Brian Lang, Lee Levin, Matt Rollings, Jerald Romero, Dan Rudin, David Thoener, Tommy Torres, Peter Wallace, Dan Warner & Ben Wisch, engineers/mixers; Tom Coyne, mastering engineer); Bebe — Un Pokito de Rocanrol (Renaud Letang, producer; Renaud Letang & Thomas Moulin, engineers/mixers; Mandy Parnell, mastering engineer); Chico Buarque — Chico (Vinicius França & Luiz Claudio Ramos, producers; Fernando Prado, engineer/mixer; Luiz Tornaghi, mastering engineer); ChocQuibTown — Eso Es Lo Que Hay (Andrés Castro & ChocQuibTown, producers; Edgar Barrera, Carlos "El Loco" Bedolla, Scott Canto, Andrés Castro, Francisco "Kiko" Castro, Javier Garza, Tony Mardini, Guillermo Martínez, Ramón Martínez, Andrés Saavedra & Carlos Velásquez, engineers/mixers; Tom Coyne, mastering engineer); Jesse & Joy — ¿Con Quién Se Queda El Perro? (Martin Terefe, producer; Ainsley Adams, Dyre Gormsen & Thomas Juth, engineers/mixers; Geoff Pesche, mastering engineer); Carla Morrison — Déjenme Llorar (Andres Landon, Carla Morrison & Juan Manuel Torreblanca, producers; Alejandro Jiménez & Arturo "Turo" Medina, engineers/mixers; Tom Coyne, mastering engineer); Reik — Peligro (Kiko Cibrian, Ettore Grenci, Cachorro López & Sebastian Schon, producers; Mike Harris, Arturo León, Demian Nava, Sebastian Schon, Fabrizio Simoncioni & Cesar Sogbe, engineers/mixers; Chris Gehringer, mastering engineer); Arturo Sandoval — Dear Diz (Every Day I Think of You) (Gregg Field & Arturo Sandoval, producers; Gregg Field & Don Murray, engineers/mixers; Paul Blakemore, mastering engineer); Caetano Veloso, Gilberto Gil and Ivete Sangalo — Especial Ivete, Gil E Caetano (Rafael Dragaud & Roberto Talma, producers; Vitor Farias, engineer/mixer; Carlos Freitas, mastering engineer)
2013	Draco Rosa · George Noriega & Draco Rosa, producers · Dave Clauss, Héctor Espinosa, Benny Faccone, Seth Atkins Horan, Nelson "Gazu" Jaime, Allan Leschhorn, Fernando Quintana, Fabián Serrano & Sadaharu Yagi, album recording engineers · Benny Faccone, mixer · Bob Ludwig, mastering engineer	Vida	Pablo Alborán — Tanto (Manuel Illán, album producer; Bori Alarcón, album recording engineer; Javier García, album mixer; Bori Alarcón & Javier García, album mastering engineers); Bajofondo — Presente (Juan Campodónico & Gustavo Santaolalla, album producers; Julio Berta, Juan Campodónico, Joe Chiccarelli, Jorge da Silva & Aníbal Kerpel, album recording engineers; Gustavo Santaolalla, album mixer; Tom Baker, album mastering engineer); Miguel Bosé — Papitwo (Miguel Bosé, Count De Money, José Luis De La Peña, Carlos Jean, Andrés Levin, Fernando Ortí, Roberto Rodríguez, Janina Rosado, Nicolás Sorín & Martin Terefe, producers; Pepo Sherman, album recording engineer; Ray Aldaco, Andy Bradfield, Michele Canova Iorfida, Johnny Doran, Carlos Jean, Sam Keyte, Allan Leschhorn, Roberto Rodíguez, Janina Rosado, Andres Saavedra, Ricardo Sanz, Lauren Serrano, Baeho Shinen, Nicolás Sorín, Aleks Syntek, Nikolaj Torp & Alex Wong, album mixers; Antonio Baglio, album mastering engineer); Andrés Cepeda — Lo Mejor Que Hay En Mi Vida (José Gaviria, Bernardo Ossa, Fernado "Toby" Tobón & Carlos Villavicencio, album producers; Mauricio Cano, José Gaviria, Lee Levin, Gian Marco, Bernardo Ossa, Mauricio Pantoja, Facundo Rodríguez & Fernando "Toby" Tobón, album recording engineers; Francisco 'Kiko' Castro, Iker Gastamiza & Boris Milán, album mixers; Mike Couzzi, album mastering engineer); Natalie Cole — Natalie Cole en Español (David Foster, Humberto Gatica, Juan Luis Guerra & Rudy Pérez, album producers; Andrés Bermúdez & Bruce Sweeden, album recording engineers; Vlado Meller, album mastering engineer); Guaco — Escultura (Gustavo Aguado & Juan Carlos Salas, album producers; Juan Carlos Salas, album mixer; Erik Aldrey, album mastering engineer); Gian Marco — Versiones (Gary Grant & Arturo Sandoval, album producers; Steve Genewick, José Hernández & David Santos, album recording engineers; Dustin Higgins, album mixer; Doug Sax, album mastering engineer); Alejandro Sanz — La Música No Se Toca (Julio Reyes Copello & Alejandro Sanz, producers; Alonso Arreola, Edgar Barrera, Sebastian De Peyrecave, Javier Garza, Kamilo Kratc, Lee Levin, Javier Limón, Julio Reyes Copello, Alejandro Sanz, Rafa Sardina, Samuel Torres, Juan Pablo Vega & Dan Warner, album recording engineers; Sebastian Krys, album mixer; Antonio Baglio, album mastering engineer); Carlos Vives — Corazón Profundo (Mario Caldato Jr., Andrés Castro, Rock Mafia & Carlos Vives, album producers; Edgar Barrera, Mauricio Cano, Scott Canto, Andrés Castro, Francisco "Kiko" Castro, Efraín "Junito" Dávila, Guido Díaz, Javier Garza, Guianko Gómez, Carlos Huertas, Shafik Palis, Julio Reyes & Curt Schneider, album recording engineers; Juan Mario "Mayito" Aracil, Luis Barrera Jr., Javier Garza & Curt Schneider, album mixers; Tom Coyne & David Kutch, album mastering engineers)
2014	Paco de Lucía · Paco de Lucía, producer · Paco de Lucía, album recording engineer · Bori Alarcón, mixer · Bori Alarcón, mastering engineer	Canción Andaluza	Marc Anthony — 3.0 (Marc Anthony, Sergio George & Julio Reyes Copello, album producers; Juan Mario ""Mayito"" Aracil & Julio Reyes Copello, album recording engineers; Carlos Álvarez, album mixer; Tom Coyne, album mastering engineer); Rubén Blades — Tangos (Carlos Franzetti, album producer; Jan Holzer, Ariel Lavigna & Chris Sulit, album recording engineers; Chris Sulit, album mixer; Chris Sulit, album mastering engineer); Calle 13 — Multi Viral (Calle 13, album producers; John Blais, Olimpia Calderón, Ryan Gilligan, Phil Joly, Adolfo Martínez, Ramón Martínez, Kevin Mills, Rafa Sardina & Carlos Velázquez, album recording engineers; Michael Brauer & Rich Costey, album mixers; Joe Laporta, album mastering engineer); Camila — Elypse (Mario Domm, Pablo Hurtado, Stephane Lozac'h, Ricky Luna & Oliver Visconti, album producers; Gabriel Castañón, Mario Domm, Geoff Foster, Peter Mokran & Adrián Trujillo, album recording engineers; Peter Mokran, album mixer; Bernie Grundman, album mastering engineer); Lila Downs, Niña Pastori, Soledad — Raíz (Julio Jiménez Chaboli & Aneiro Taño, album producers; Julio Jiménez Chaboli, Max Miglin, Aneiro Taño & Rodolfo Vázquez, album recording engineers; Julio Jiménez Chaboli, Max Miglin, Aneiro Taño & Rodolfo Vázquez, album mixers; Max Miglin, album mastering engineer); Jorge Drexler — Bailar en la Cueva (Eduardo Cabra, Carles Campi Campón, Jorge Drexler, Mario Galeano & Sebastián Merlín, album producers; Carlos Barres, John Blais, Carles Campi Campón, Néstor Cifuentes, Leo Moreira, Héctor Quídea, José María Resillo & Simón Vélez, album recording engineers; Carles Campón, album mixer; Bori Alarcón, album mastering engineer); Fonseca — Fonseca Sinfónico (Fonseca, album producer; Eduardo Bergallo, album recording engineer; Eduardo Bergallo, album mixer; Diego Guerrero, album mastering engineer); Jarabe de Palo — Somos (Micky Forteza-Rey & Jarabe De Palo, album producers; José Luis Molero, Gerard Ripoll & Jordi Sole, album recording engineers; Yves Roussel, album mastering engineer); Carlos Vives — Más Corazón Profundo (Mario Caldato Jr., Andrés Castro, Rock Mafia & Carlos Vives, album producers; Edgar Barrera, Mauricio Cano, Scott Canto, Andrés Castro, Francisco ""Kiko"" Castro, Efraín ""Junito"" Dávila, Guido Díaz, Javier Garza, Guianko Gómez, Carlos Huertas, Shafik Palis, Julio Reyes & Curt Schneider, album recording engineers; Juan Mario ""Mayito"" Aracil, Luis Barrera Jr., Javier Garza & Curt Schneider, album mixers; Tom Coyne & David Kutch, album mastering engineers)
2015	Juan Luis Guerra 4.40 · Juan Luis Guerra & Janina Rosado, producers · Edgar Barrera, Rafael Lazzaro & Allan Leschhorn, album recording engineers · Ronnie Torres, album mixers · Adam Ayan, album mastering engineer	Todo Tiene Su Hora	Pepe Aguilar — MTV Unplugged (Emmanuel Del Real, album producer; Gustavo Borner, Justin Moskevich, David Parra & Luis Roman, album recording engineers; Gustavo Borner, album mixer; Tom Baker, album mastering engineer); Rubén Blades with Roberto Delgado & Orquesta — Son de Panamá (Roberto Delgado, album producer; Roberto Delgado, Pablo Governatori & Ignacio "Nacho" Molino, album recording engineers; Roberto Delgado, Pablo Governatori & Ignacio "Nacho" Molino, album mixers; Daniel Ovie, album mastering engineer); Miguel Bosé — Amo (Andrew Frampton, Andrés Levin, Filip Mitrovic & Brubaker XL, album producers; Ray Aldaco, Héctor Castillo, Andrew Frampton, Pepo Sherman, Johnny Skalber & Brubaker Xl, album recording engineers; Andy Bradfield, Héctor Castillo & Dan Frampton, album mixers; Antonio Baglio, album mastering engineer); Café Quijano — Orígenes: El Bolero Volumen 3 (Kenny O'brien & Manuel Quijano, album producers; Luis Villa, album recording engineer; Luis Villa, album mixer; Miguel Ángel González, album mastering engineer); Natalia Jiménez — Creo En Mí (Josh Cumbee, Jayson Dezuzio, Scott Effman, Non Fiction, Toby Gad, Rob Kleiner, Motiff & Lukas Nathanson, album producers; Julian Bohorquez, Efraín "E-Flat" González, Lee Levin, Juan Cristobal Losada, Alfonso Ordóñez & Dan Warner, album recording engineers; Motiff & Jon Rezin, album mixers; Tom Coyne, album mastering engineer); Natalia Lafourcade — Hasta la Raíz (Leonel García, Lafourcade and Cachorro López, album producers; Andrés Borda, Eduardo Del Águila, Demián Nava, Alan Ortiz Grande, Alan Saucedo & Sebastián Schunt, album recording engineers; Eduardo De El Águila & Cesar Sogbe, album mixers; José Blanco, album mastering engineer); Monsieur Periné — Caja De Música (Eduardo Cabra, album producer; John Blais, Eduardo Cabra, Dan Cherouny, Mauricio Garcia, Nicolás Ladron De Guevara, Stefano Pizzaia, Harold Wendel Sanders & Santiago Sarabia, album recording engineers; John Blais & Fab Dupont, album mixers; Diego Calviño & Pablo López Ruíz, album mastering engineers); Alejandro Sanz — Sirope (Sebastian Krys & Alejandro Sanz, album producers; Armando Ávila, Sebastian Krys, Juan Carlos Miguel & Pepe Ortega, album recording engineers; Sebastian Krys & Rafa Sardina, album mixers; Tom Coyne, album mastering engineer); María Toledo — ConSentido (María Toledo, album producer; Caco Refojo, album recording engineer; Caco Refojo, album mixer; Caco Refojo, album mastering engineer)
2016	Juan Gabriel · Gustavo Farías, album producer · Pete Fuchs, Dan Moore & Erwin Ríos, album recording engineers · Diego Farías, Gustavo Farías, Peter Fuchs, Dan Moore, Dave Rideau and Jean Smitt, album mixers	Los Dúo 2	Pablo Alborán — Tour Terral (Bori Alarcón, album producer; Alarcón and Roberto Rodríguez, album recording engineers; Alarcón, Adrían Schinoff Noher and Carlos Vera, album mixers; Alarcón, album mastering engineer); Andrea Bocelli — Cinema (Edición En Español) (David Foster, Humberto Gatica and Tony Renis, album producers; Gatica, album recording engineer; Gatica and Martin Nessi, album mixers; Vladdo Meller, album mastering engineer); Andrés Cepeda — Mil Ciudades (Bernardo Ossa, Mauricio Pantoja, Julio Reyes Copello, Tommy Torres and Dan Warner, album producers; Richard Bravo, Mauricio Cano, Reyes Copello, Fonseca, Diego García, Jan Holzner, Kamilo Kratc, Lee Levin, Carlos Fernando López, Ricardo López Lalinde, Dario Moscatelli, Martín Nessi, Camilo Ortega, Ossa, Pantoja, Stefano Pizzaia, Natalia Ramírez, Torres, Mauricio Vilar, Pete Wallace and Warner, album recording engineers; Álvaro Alencar, Bob Clearmountain, Iker Gastaminza and Thom Russo, album mixers; Antonio Baglio, Mike Couzzi and Ted Jensen, album mastering engineers); Djavan — Vidas Pra Contar (Djavan, album producer; Marcelo Saboia, album recording engineer; Saboia, album mixer; Andre Días, album mastering engineer); Fonseca — Conexión (Julio Reyes Copello, album producer; Rolando Alejandro, Juan Camilo Arboleda, Richard Bravo, Alex Casadiego, Juan Fernando Fonseca, Kamilo Kratc, Lee Levin, Carlos Fernando López, Ricardo López Lalinde, Natalia Ramírez, Reyes Copello and Gabriel Vallejo, album recording engineers; Iker Gastaminaza, album mixer; Tom Coyne, album mastering engineer); Jesse & Joy — Un Besito Más (Juan Luis Guerra, Jesse Huerta, Fraser T Smith, Martin Terefe and Tommy Torres, album producers; Beatríz Artola, Dyre Gormsen, Rogelio Jiménez Osuna, Kristian Larsen, Allan Leschhorn, Andrés Saavedra, Torres, Adrián Trujillo, Dan Warner and Oskar Winberg, album recording engineers; Eduardo De La Paz Canel and Craig Silvey, album mixers; John Davis, album mastering engineer); José Lugo & Guasábara Combo — ¿Donde Están? (Lugo, album producer; Manuel Calero, JoseMa Lugo and Ronnie Torres, album recording engineers; Torres, album mixer; Torres, album mastering engineer); Diego Torres — Buena Vida (Rafa Arcaute and Julio Reyes Copello, album producers; Rafa Arcaute, Luis Barrera Jr, Richard Bravo, Gustavo Celis, Javier Garza, Kamilo Kratc, Lee Levin, Carlos Fernando López, Ricardo López Lalinde, Reyes Copello, Esteban Varela and Dan Warner, album recording engineers; Rafa Sardina, album mixer; Antonio Baglio, album mastering engineer); Julieta Venegas — Algo Sucede (Cachorro López and Venegas, album producers; Eduardo Chermont, Ernesto Garcia, Demián Nava and Sebastián Schon, album recording engineers; Héctor Castillo, album mixer; Greg Calbi, album mastering engineer)
2017	Rubén Blades with Roberto Delgado & Orquesta · Roberto Delgado, producer · Pablo Governatori & Roberto Delgado, album recording engineers · Ignacio Molino, Pablo Governatori & Roberto Delgado, album mixers · Daniel Ovie, mastering engineer	Salsa Big Band	Antonio Carmona — Obras Son Amores (Carmona and Daniel García Diego, producers; Carlos Martos and Curro Ureba, album recording engineers; Martos, album mixer and album mastering engineer); Vicente García — A La Mar (Eduardo Cabra and Vicente García, album producers; John Blais, Rafael Lázzaro Colón, García, Allan Leschhörn, Jorge Corredor Lodoño and José Víctor Olivier Sterling, album recording engineers; Blais, Colón and Harold Wendell Sanders, album mixers; Greg Calbi and Alex De Turk, album mastering engineers); Nicky Jam — Fénix (Banx & Ranx, Dwayne Chin-Quee, Johan Esteban Espinosa, Johnattan Gaviria, Yhoan Manuel Jiménez, Tarik Johnston, Cristhian Mena, Urbani Mota, Carlos Peralta, Pedro Reynoso, Jorge Luis Romero and Egbert Rosa, album producers; La Industria Inc S.A.S and South Point Studios, album recording engineers; Edgar González, Mena and Carlos Paucar, album mixers; Tom Coyne, Mike Fuller and Esteban J. Piñero, album mastering engineers); Juanes — Mis Planes Son Amarte (Juanes, Alejandro Patiño and Alejandro Ramirez, album producers; Josh Gudwin, album mixer; Tom Coyne, album mastering engineer); Mon Laferte — La Trenza (Manú Jalil and Mon Laferte, album producers; Eduardo Del Águila and Alán Ortiz, album recording engineers; Eduardo Del Águila, album mixer; Chalo González, album mastering engineer); Natalia Lafourcade — Musas (Un Homenaje al Folclore Latinoamericano en Manos de Los Macorinos, Vol. 1) (Cheche Alara and Gustavo Guerrero, album producers; Héctor Castillo, album recording engineer; Noah Georgeson, album mixer; Gavin Lurssen, album mastering engineer); Residente — Residente (Rafael Arcaute, Goran Bregovic, Francis Pérez, Residente and Trooko, album producers; Arcaute, Beatriz Artola, Alex Berdz, Brandon Bost, Phil Joly, Hubert Kofi Anti, Ogi Radivojevic, Supa Saï and Carlos Velásquez, album recording engineers; Tom Elmhirst, album mixer; Ted Jensen, album mastering engineer); Shakira — El Dorado (The Arcade, Nasri Atweh, Black M., Andrés Castro, Chan El Genio, Dwayne "Supa Dups" Chin-Quee, Dadju, Nicky Jam, Kevin Jiménez ADG, D'Lesly "Dice" Lora, Maluma, Luis Fernando Ochoa, Rayito For Los Tailors, Jean Rodríguez, Geoffrey Royce Rojas, Shakira, Dany Synthé, Carlos Vives and Saga WhiteBlack, album producers; Luis Barrera Jr., Rudy Bethancourt, Ray Charles Brown Jr., Lincoln Castañeda, Andrés Castro, Gustavo Celis, Chan "El Genio", Dave Clauss, Carlos Hernández Carbonell, Kevin Jiménez, Andre Nascimbeni, Redeyes, Jean Rodríguez and Saga WhiteBlack, album recording engineers; Dave Clauss, Carlos Hernández Carbonell, Alfredo Matheus and Saga WhiteBlack, album mixers; Adam Ayan, album mastering engineer); Danay Suárez — Palabras Manuales (Roberto Fonseca, Stephen Marley, Jason Matthews, Idan Raichel, Gilad Shmueli, Danay Suárez and Alain Vázquez, album producers; Waldy Domínguez, Delio Ferrero Moreira, Carlos Hervia González, PT Najera, Idan Raichel, Chris Romero, Gennaro Schiano, Gilad Shmueli and Andrew Yeomanson, album recording engineers; Yair Goren, Stephen Marley, Jason Matthews, Idan Raichel, Schiano, Shmueli, Suárez and Yeomanson, album mixers; Michael Fuller, album mastering engineer)
2018	Luis Miguel · Luis Miguel & David Reitzas, album producers · David Reitzas & Jess Sutcliffe, album recording engineers · David Reitzas, album mixer · José Alfredo Jiménez, songwriter · Eric Boulanger & David Reitzas, album mastering engineers	¡México Por Siempre!	Pablo Alborán — Prometo (Julio Reyes Copello, album producer; Carlos Fernando López, Ricardo López Lalinde, Natalia Ramírez & Julio Reyes Copello, album recording engineers; Javier Garza, Carlos Fernando López, Trevor Muzzy & Julio Reyes Copello, album mixers; Pablo Alborán, songwriter; Antonio Baglio, album mastering engineer); J Balvin — Vibras (Childsplay, Dj Chuckie, Marco Masís, Carlos E. Ortiz, Pardo, Alejandro Ramírez, Juan G. Rivera & Willy William, album producers; Phil Greiss, Josh Gudwin, Alejandro Patiño & Juan G. Rivera, album mixers; J Balvin, Jesús M. Nieves Cortes, Marco Masís & Alejandro Ramírez, songwriters; Dave Kutch, album mastering engineer); Chico Buarque — Caravanas (Vinicius França & Luiz Claudio Ramos, album producers; Lucas Ariel, Gabriel Pinheiro & Fernando Prado, album recording engineers; Gabriel Pinheiro, album mixer; Chico Buarque, songwriter; Luiz Tornaghi, album mastering engineer); Jorge Drexler — Salvavidas de Hielo (Carles Campi Campón & Jorge Drexler, album producers; Carles Campi Campón, Ernesto García & Pablo Martín Jones, album recording engineers; Matías Cella, album mixer; Jorge Drexler, songwriter; Fred Kevorkian, album mastering engineer); El David Aguilar — Siguiente (David Bravou, Juan Cubas, Guillermo Durán, El David Aguilar, Juan García Álvarez, Pere George, Carlos González, Ulises Hadjis, Hernán Hecht, Alberto Hernández, Miguel Inzunza, Alejandro Jiménez, Demián Jiménez, Carlos Mier, Diego Mier, Herman Nunes, Luca Ortega, Alan Saucedo & Ignacio Sotelo, album producers; David Bravou, Juan Cubas, Guillermo Durán, Juan García Álvarez, Carlos González, Ulises Hadjis, Hernán Hecht, Miguel Inzunza, Demián Jiménez, Diego Mier, Herman Nunes, Luca Ortega & Alan Saucedo, album recording engineers; Ignacio Sotelo, album mixer; El David Aguilar, songwriter; Juan García Álvarez, album mastering engineer); Kany García — Soy Yo (Residente, Marcos Sánchez, Trooko & Afo Verde, album producers; Larry Coll, José E. Díaz, Orlando Ferrer, Luca Germini, Iván Belvis Navarro, Marcos Sánchez & Carlos Velázquez, album recording engineers; Beatriz Artola, album mixer; Kany García, songwriter; Eduardo Ramos, album mastering engineer); Natalia Lafourcade — Musas: Un Homenaje al Folclore Latinoamericano en Manos de Los Macorinos, Vol. 2 (Cheche Alara, Kiko Campos & Gustavo Guerrero, album producers; Rubén López Arista, Daniel Bitrán Arizpe & Héctor Castillo, album recording engineers; Rubén López Arista & Noah Georgeson, album mixers; Natalia Lafourcade, songwriter; Gavin Lurssen, album mastering engineer); Monsieur Periné — Encanto Tropical (Eduardo Cabra, Catalina García Barahona & Santiago Prieto Sarabia, album producers; Eduardo Cabra, Uriel Dorfman, Santiago Prieto Sarabia & Alan Saucedo, album recording engineers; Fab Dupont & Harold Sanders, album mixers; Catalina García Barahona & Santiago Prieto Sarabia, songwriters; Diego Calviño & Pablo López Ruíz, album mastering engineers); Rozalén — Cuando El Río Suena... (Adrián García, Ismael Guijarro & Sebastián Schon, album producers; Jordi Gil, Ismael Guijarro, Manu Pájaro, Santiago Quizhpe, José María Rosillo & Sebastián Schon, album recording engineers; Felipe Guevara, José Maria Rosillo, Eduardo Ruíz, Sebastián Schon & Oscar Vinader, album mixers; Rozalén, songwriter; Juan Hidalgo & Mike Kalajian, album mastering engineers)
2019	Rosalía · El Guincho and Rosalía, album producers · El Guincho, album recording engineer · Jaycen Joshua, album mixer · Antón Álvarez Alfaro, El Guincho and Rosalía, songwriters · Chris Athens, album mastering engineer	El Mal Querer	Paula Arenas — Visceral (Julio Reyes Copello, album producer; Nicolás de la Espriella, Carlos Fernando López, Ricardo López Lalinde, Natalia Ramírez & Julio Reyes Copello, album recording engineers; Nicolás Ramírez, album mixer; Paula Arenas & Julio Reyes Copello, songwriters; Antonio Baglio & Robin Reumers, album mastering engineers); Rubén Blades — Paraíso Road Gang (Luis Enrique Becerra & Rubén Blades, album producers; Luis Enrique Becerra & José Ramón Guerra, album recording engineers; Luis Enrique Becerra & Rubén Blades, album mixers; Rubén Blades, songwriter; Geoff Pesche, album mastering engineer); Andrés Calamaro — Cargar la Suerte (Gustavo Borner, album producer; Gustavo Borner, album recording engineer; Gustavo Borner, album mixer; Andrés Calamaro & German Wiedemer, songwriters; Gustavo Borner, album mastering engineer); Fonseca — Agustín (Fonseca, album producer; Andrés Borda, album recording engineer; Iker Gastaminza & Trevor Lyle Muzzy, album mixers; Fonseca, songwriter; Dave Kutch, album mastering engineer); Luis Fonsi — Vida (Mauricio Rengifo & Andrés Torres, album producers; Luis Fonsi, Mauricio Rengifo & Andrés Torres, album recording engineers; Jaycen Joshua, album mixer; Luis Fonsi, Mauricio Rengifo & Andrés Torres, songwriters; Dave Kutch, album mastering engineer); Alejandro Sanz — #ElDisco (Alfonso Pérez, Julio Reyes Copello & Alejandro Sanz, album producers; Nicolás De La Espriella, Carlos Fernando Lopez, Alfonso Pérez, Natalia Ramírez, Nicolás Ramírez & Julio Reyes Copello, album recording engineers; Trevor Lyle Muzzy, album mixer; Alejandro Sanz, songwriter; Gene Grimaldi, album mastering engineer); Ximena Sariñana — ¿Dónde Bailarán las Niñas? (Juan Pablo Vega, album producer; Daniel Bitrán Arizpe, album recording engineer; Alejandro Patiño, album mixer; Ximena Sariñana & Juan Pablo Vega, songwriters; Alejandro Patiño, album mastering engineer); Tony Succar — Más de Mi (Marc Quiñones & Tony Succar, album producers; Santiago Diaz, Nestor Rigaud & Tony Succar, album recording engineers; Alfredo Matheus, album mixer; Jorge Luis Piloto & Tony Succar, songwriters; Michael Fuller, album mastering engineer); Sebastián Yatra — Fantasía (Mauricio Rengifo & Andrés Torres, album producers; Nicolas Ladrón De Guevara, Mauricio Rengifo & Andrés Torres, album recording engineers; Jaycen Joshua, album mixer; Mauricio Rengifo, Andrés Torres & Sebastián Yatra, songwriters; Dave Kutch, album mastering engineer)
2020	Natalia Lafourcade · Kiko Campos, album producer · José Luis Fernández & Rubén López Arista, album recording engineers · Rubén López Arista, album mixer · Natalia Lafourcade, songwriter · Michael Fuller, album mastering engineer	Un Canto por México, Vol. 1	Bad Bunny — YHLQMDLG (Henry De La Prida & Marco Masis "Tainy", album producers; La Paciencia, album recording engineer; Josh Gudwin, album mixer; Bad Bunny, songwriter; Colin Leonard, album mastering engineer); J Balvin and Bad Bunny — Oasis (Marco Masis "Tainy" & Alejandro "Sky" Ramírez, album producers; Joel Iglesias, Marco Masis "Tainy", Alejandro "Sky" Ramírez & Roberto Rosado, album recording engineers; Josh Gudwin, album mixer; Bad Bunny, J Balvin, Marco Masis "Tainy" & Alejandro "Sky" Ramírez, songwriters; Colin Leonard, album mastering engineer); J Balvin — Colores (Alejandro "Sky" Ramírez, album producer; Joel Iglesias, album recording engineer; Josh Gudwin, album mixer; J Balvin, Michael Brun, Rene Cano & Alejandro "Sky" Ramírez, songwriters; Colin Leonard, album mastering engineer); Camilo — Por Primera Vez (Camilo, Jon Leone, Richi López & Ricardo Montaner, album producers; Jon Leone & Richi López, album recording engineers; Edgar Barrera, Camilo, Jon Leone & Richi López, songwriters; Mike Bozzi, album mastering engineer); Kany García — Mesa Para Dos (Julio Reyes Copello, album producer; Nicolás Ramírez, Julio Reyes Copello & Daniel Uribe, album recording engineers; Nicolás Ramírez & Marcos Sánchez, album mixers; Kany García, songwriter; Gene Grimaldi, album mastering engineer); Jesse & Joy — Aire (Versión Día) (Charlie Heat, Jesse Huerta & Martin Terefe, album producers; Oskar Winberg, album recording engineer; Josh Gudwin, album mixer; Jason Boyd & Jesse & Joy, songwriters; Colin Leonard, album mastering engineer); Ricky Martin — Pausa (Julio Reyes Copello & Jean Rodríguez, album producers; Nicolás De La Espriella, Enrique Larreal & Julio Reyes Copello, album recording engineers; Jaycen Joshua, album mixer; Ricky Martin & Danay Suárez, songwriters; Felipe Tichauer, album mastering engineer); Fito Páez — La Conquista del Espacio (Gustavo Borner, Diego Olivero & Fito Paez, album producers; Gustavo Borner & Phil Levine, album recording engineers; Gustavo Borner, album mixer; Fito Paez, songwriter; Justin Moshkevich, album mastering engineer); Carlos Vives — Cumbiana (Andrés Leal, Martín Velilla & Carlos Vives, album producers; Andrés Borda, Nicolas Cajamarca, Jorge Corredor, Daniel Cortés, Chris Crawford, Einar Escaf, Sancho Gómez Escolar, Lobzan Graciani, Andrés Leal, Harbey Marín, Dave Rowland & Martín Velilla, album recording engineers; Pamela Velez, Manny Marroquin, album mixer; Carlos Vives, songwriter; Emerson Mancini, album mastering engineer)
2021	Rubén Blades and Roberto Delgado & Orquesta · Roberto Delgado, album producer · Oscar Marín, album recording engineer · Delgado and Oscar Marín, album mixers · Blades, songwriter · Daniel Ovie, album mastering engineer	SALSWING!	Pablo Alborán — Vértigo (Alborán and Julio Reyes Copello, album producers; Pablo Pulido, Reyes Copello and Natalia Schlesinger, album recording engineers; Nicolás Ramírez, album mixer; Alborán, songwriter; Gene Grimaldi, album mastering engineer); Paula Arenas — Mis Amores (Maria Elisa Ayerbe, Sebastián Mejía and Julio Reyes Copello, album producers; Maria Elisa Ayerbe, Mejía and Reyes Copello, album recording engineers; Maria Elisa Ayerbe and Reyes Copello, album mixers; Arenas, Ayerbe, Kany García, Fernando Osorio, Reyes Copello and Juan Pablo Vega, songwriters; Camilo Silva, album mastering engineer); Bad Bunny — El Último Tour Del Mundo (Mag and Tainy, album producers; Josh Gudwin, album mixer; Bad Bunny, Mag and Tainy, songwriters; Colin Leonard, album mastering engineer); Camilo — Mis Manos (Édgar Barrera and Camilo, album producers; Natalia Ramírez and Nicolás Ramírez, album recording engineers; Maddox Chhim, album mixer; Barrera and Camilo, songwriters; Mike Bozzi, album mastering engineer); Nana Caymmi — Nana, Tom, Vinicius (Dory Caymmi, album producer; Mario Jorge Bruno, Mario Gil, Kira Malevskaia and Gabriel Teixeira, album recording engineers; Gil, album mixer; Vinicius de Moraes and Tom Jobim, songwriters; Gil, album mastering engineer); Juan Luis Guerra — Privé (Guerra and Janina Rosado, album producers; Allan Leschhorn, album recording engineer; Leschhorn, album mixer; Guerra, songwriter; Adam Ayan, album mastering engineer); Juanes — Origen (Juanes and Sebastian Krys, album producers; Said Edid, Daniel Galindo, Juanes, Krys and Pepe Ortega, album recording engineers; Krys, album mixer; Brian Lucey, album mastering engineer); Natalia Lafourcade — Un Canto por México, Vol. 2 (Kiko Campos, album producer; José Luis Fernández, Rubén López Arista, Alan Ortiz Grande and Alan Saucedo, album recording engineers; Rubén López Arista, album mixer; Michael Fuller, album mastering engineer); C. Tangana — El Madrileño (Alizzz, Victor Martínez and C. Tangana, album producers; Alizzz, album recording engineer; Delbert Bowers & Lewis Pickett, album mixer; Alizzz, Martínez and C. Tangana, songwriters; Chris Athens, album mastering engineer)
2022	Rosalía · James Blake, Frank Dukes, El Guincho, Noah Goldstein, Dylan Patrice, Sie7e, Jean Rodriguez, Sky Rompiendo, Rosalía, Tainy, Michael Uzowuru, The Weeknd & Pharrell Williams, album producers · Shin Kamiyama, Michael Larson, Sean Matsukawa, Tyler Murphy & David Rodríguez, album recording engineers · Manny Marroquin, album mixer · Rauw Alejandro, William Bevan, Daniel Gomez Carrero, LaShawn Daniels, Frank Dukes, El Guincho, Kamaal Fareed, Adam Feeney, Larry Gold, Noah Goldstein, Kaan Güneşberk, Teo Halm, Cory Henry, Chad Hugo, Fred Jerkins III, Rodney Jerkins, Tokischa Altagracia Peralta Juárez, James Blake Litherland, James W. Manning, Marco Masis, Juan Luis Morera, Urbani Mota Cedeño, William Ray Norwood Jr., Juan Ivan Orengo, Carlops Querol, Justin Rafael Quiles, David Rodríguez, Rosalía, Jacob Sherman, Alejandro Ramirez Suárez, So Y Tiet, Pilar Vila Tobella, Michael Uzowuru, José Miguel Vizcaya Sánchez, The Weeknd, Dylan Wiggins & Pharrell Williams, songwriters · Chris Gehringer, album mastering engineer)	Motomami (Digital Album)	Aguilera – Christina Aguilera (Rafael Arcaute, Édgar Barrera, Josh Berrios, Andy Clay, DallasK, Feid, Honeyboos, Luis Barrera Jr., Jon Leone, Juan Diego Linares, Yasmil Marrufo, Mauricio Rengifo, Jean Rodríguez, Daniel Rondón, Slow, Andrés Torres, Afo Verde, Federico Vindver & Tobias Wincorn, album producers; Rafael Arcaute, Édgar Barrera, Andy Clay, Morgan David, Feid, Hi Flow, Luis Barrera Jr., Ray Charles Brown, Jr., Juan Diego Linares, Yasmil Marrufo, Mauricio Rengifo, Jean Rodríguez, Rafael Rodríguez, Matt Rollings, Slow, Andrés Torres, Felipe Trujillo & Federico Vindver, album recording engineers; Dj Riggins, Jaycen Joshua, Jacob Richards & Mike Seaberg, album mixers; Christina Aguilera, Rafael Arcaute, Édgar Barrera, Josh Berrios, Gino Borri, Luigi Castillo, Santiago Castillo, Jorge Luis Chacín, Andy Clay, Kat Dahlia, DallasK, Mario Domm, Feid, Becky G, Yoel Henríquez, Luis Barrera Jr., Carolina Colón Juarbe, Jon Leone, Juan Diego Linares, Yasmil Marrufo, Juan Morelli, Nicki Nicole, Ozuna, Nathy Peluso, Miguel Andrés Martínez Perea, Pablo Preciado, Servando Primera, Mauricio Rengifo, Rafael Rodríguez, Daniel Rondón, Elena Rose, Martina Stoessel, Sharlene Taule, Andrés Torres, Federico Vindver & Tobias Wincorn, songwriters; Jaycen Joshua, album mastering engineer; Pa'llá Voy – Marc Anthony (Marc Anthony, Sergio George & Julio Reyes Copello, album producers; Juan Mario Aracil & Gerardo Rodriguez, album recording engineers; Juan Mario Aracil, album mixer; Marc Anthony, Rafael Regginalds Aponte, Ángel Alberto Arce, Édgar Barrera, Luigi Castillo, Santiago Castillo, Alain De Armas, Yoenni José Echevarría Barrero, Sergio George, Reinaldo R. López, Álvaro Lenier Mesa, Johann Morales, Florentino Primera Mussett, Papa Serigne Seck & Elena Rose, songwriters; Adam Ayan, album mastering engineer); Un Verano Sin Ti – Bad Bunny (Martin Coogan, Demy & Clipz, Elikai, HAZE, La Pacencia, Cheo Legendary, Mag, MagicEnElBeat, Mora, Subelo Neo, Jota Rosa & Tainy, producers; Josh Gudwin & La Pacencia, mixers; Rauw Alejandro, Bad Bunny, Raquel Berrios, Joshua Conway, Mick Coogan, Jhay Cortez, Luis Del Valle, Elena Rose, Liliana Margarita Saumet, Orlando Javier Valle Vega & Maria Zardoya, songwriters; Colin Leonard, album mastering engineer); Deja – Bomba Estéreo (José Castillo, Simón Mejía & Jeff Peñalva, album producers; Daniel Bustos & Jeff Peñalva, album recording engineers; Damian Taylor, album mixer; Yemi Alade, Shyman Daniel Barry, Carles Campi Campón, José Castillo, Efraín Cuadrado, Leonel García, David M. Karbal, Simón Mejía, Jeff Peñalva, Lido Pimienta, Elizabeth Rodríguez, Liliana Saumet & Magdelys Savigne, songwriters; Chris Allgood & Emily Lazar, album mastering engineers); Tinta y Tiempo – Jorge Drexler (Rafa Arcaute, Javier Calequi, Carles Campi Campón, Jorge Drexler, Noga Erez, Didi Gutman, Victor Martínez, Pablopablo, C. Tangana & Federico Vindver, album producers; Daniel Alanís, Luis Enrique Becerra, Marc Blanes, Martín Buscaglia, Carles Campi Campón, Pablo Drexler, Lucas Piedracueva & Ori Rousso, album recording engineers; Carles Campi Campón & Daniel Carvalho, album mixers; Antón Álvarez Alfaro, Martín Buscaglia, Carlos Casacuberta, Jorge Drexler, Pablo Drexler, Noga Erez, Didi Gutman, Víctor Martínez, Alejandra Melfo, Ori Rousso & Fernando Velázquez, songwriters; Fred Kevorkian, album mastering engineer); ya no somos los mismos – Elsa y Elmar (Alizzz, Julián Bernal, Eduardo Cabra, Elsa Carvajal, Nico Cotton, Manuel Lara & Malay, album producers; Julián Bernal, Nico Cotton, Carlitos González, Alberto Hernández, Michel Kuri, Malay, Felipe Mejía, Jv Olivier, Juan Sebastián Parra, Alejandro García Partida & Alan Saucedo, album recording engineers; Julián Bernal, Mikaelin Bluespruce, Raúl López, Lewis Pickett & Harold Sanders, album mixers; Álvaro José Arroyo, Julián Bernal, Claudia Brant, Eduardo Cabra, Elsa Carvajal, Leonel García, Vicente García Guillen, Joel Mathias Isaksson, Luis Jiménez, Manuel Lara, McKlopedia, Oskar Lars Gustav Nyman & Pablo Preciado, songwriters; Julián Bernal & Dave Kutch, album mastering); Viajante – Fonseca (José Castillo, Fonseca, Juan Galeano, Yadam González, Simón Mejía, Mauricio Rengifo, Julio Reyes Copello & Andrés Torres, album producers; José Castillo, Sebastian De Peyrecave, Antonio Espinosa Holguín, Fonseca, Juan Galeano, Yadam González, Carlos Fernando López, Simón Mejía, Nicolás Ramírez, Mauricio Rengifo, Julio Reyes Copello, Alen Hadzi Stefanov, Andrés Torres & Daniel Uribe, album recording engineers; Jaycen Joshua, Trevor Muzzy, Tom Norris & Alejandro Patiño, album mixers; Mario Cáceres, José Castillo, Andy Clay, Silvestre Dangond, Juan Fernando Fonseca, Juan Galeano, Miguel Yadam González, Yoel Henríquez, Erick Alejandro Iglesias Rodríguez, Simón Mejía, Greeicy Rendón, Alejandro Rengifo, Mauricio Rengifo, Julio Reyes Copello & Andrés Torres, songwriters; Dave Kutch, Tom Norris & Alejandro Patiño, album mastering engineers); Sanz – Alejandro Sanz (Carlos Jean, Javier Limón, Alfonso Pérez & Alejandro Sanz, album producers; Carlos Del Valle, Daniel Guzmán, Andrew Hey, Sebastián Laverde, Marcos Mejías, Alfonso Pérez, Martin Roller, Alexander Sánchez “Kyd", Iván Valdés & Peter Walsh, album recording engineers; Peter Walsh, album mixer; Beatriz Álvarez Beigbeder Casas, Maria Alejandra Álvarez Beigbeder Casas, Viviana Álvarez Beigbeder Casas, María Ángeles Álvarez Beigbeder Casas, Juan D'anyelica, Paco De Lucía, Limon Jr, Javier Limón, Isidro Muñoz Alcón, José Miguel Muñoz Alcón, Alfonso Pérez & Alejandro Sanz, songwriters; Frank Arkwright, album mastering engineer); Dharma – Sebastian Yatra (Julián Bernal, Caleb Calloway, Cashae, Pablo María Rousselon De Croisoeuil Chateaurenard, Andrés Guerrero, Hear This Music, Manuel Lara, Jon Leone, Pablo López, Joan Josep Monserrat Riutort, Gabriel Morales, Andres Munera, Noise Up, Ovy on the Drums, Mauricio Rengifo, Julio Reyes Copello, Andrés Torres & Xaxo, album producers; César Augusto, Andrés Guerrero, John Hanes, Jonathan Julca, Nicolas Ladrón De Guevara, Manuel Lara, Jon Leone, Maya, Max Miglin, Andres Munera, Anthony Edward Ralph Parrilla Medina, Mauricio Rengifo, Julio Reyes Copello, Daniel Riaño, Jean Rodriguez, Natalia Schlesinger & Andrés Torres, album recording engineers; Serban Ghenea, Andrés Guerrero Ruiz, Jaycen Joshua, Mosty, Tom Norris & Natalia Schlesinger, album mixers; Rauw Alejandro, Benjamin Alerhand Sissa, J Angel, Juan Diego Arteaga, César Augusto, Joseph Michael Barrios, Julián Bernal, Manuel Alejandro Bustillo, Jorge Celedón, Orlando J. Cepeda Matos, Andy Clay, Manuel Enrique Lara Colmenares, Pablo María Rousselon De Croisoeuil, Kevyn Mauricio Cruz Moreno, Daddy Yankee, Alvaro Diaz, Alejandro Manuel Fernandez, Rosario Flores, Manuel Lorente Freire, Pablo C Fuentes, David Julca, Jonathan Julca, Manuel Lara, Jonathan David Leone, Hector C Lopez, Pablo Lopez, Luian Malave, Christian Daniel Mojica Blanco, Joan Josep Monserrat Riutort, Natti Natasha, Aitana Ocaña, Ovy On The Drums, Daniel Perez Venencia, Luis J. Perez Jr, Mariah Angelique Perez, Raphy Pina, Alejandro Rengifo, Mauricio Rengifo, José M. Reyes, Julio Reyes Copello, Juan Josep Monserrat Riutort, Elena Rose, Rafael Salcedo, Jean Carlos Santiago, Sech, Edgar Semper, Xavier Semper, Julio Manuel Gonzalez Tavarez, Andres Torres, Michael Torres Monge, Manuel Turizo, Alejandro Robledo Valencia, Elian Angel Valenzuela, Juan Camilo Vargas & Sebastián Yatra, songwriters; Mike Bozzi, Gene Grimaldi, Dave Kutch, Mosty & Tom Norris, mastering engineers)
2023	Karol G · Ovy on the Drums, album producer · Rob Kinelski, album mixer · Kevyn Mauricio Cruz Moreno, Karol G & Ovy On The Drums, songwriters · Dave Kutch, album mastering engineer	Mañana Será Bonito	La Cuarta Hoja – Pablo Alborán (Pablo Alborán, Nicolas De La Espriella, Julio Reyes, Paco Salazar & Josh Tampico, album producers; Dabruk, Pablo Pulido, Julio Reyes, Pablo Rouss, Paco Salazar, Josh Tampico, Luis Villa & Xross, album recording engineers; Felipe Guevara & Lewis Pickett, album mixers; Pablo Alborán, Maria Becerra, Álvaro De Luna, Aitana Ocaña & Leo Rizzi, songwriters; Dave Kutch, album mastering engineer); A Ciegas – Paula Arenas (María Elisa Ayerbe & Marcos Sánchez, album producers; María Elisa Ayerbe & Marcos Sánchez, album recording engineers; María Elisa Ayerbe, album mixer; Paula Arenas & Manuel Ramos, songwriters; Orlando Ferrer, album mastering engineer); De Adentro Pa Afuera – Camilo (Juan Ariza, Edgar Barrera, Camilo & Nicolás Ramírez, album producers; Juan Ariza & Nicolás Ramírez, album recording engineers; Maddox Chhim, album mixer; Edgar Barrera & Camilo, songwriters; Mike Bozzi, album mastering engineer); Décimo Cuarto – Andrés Cepeda (Carlos Taboada, album producer; Nicolás Ladrón De Guevara & Andrés Torres, album recording engineers); Vida Cotidiana – Juanes (Emmanuel Briceño Vera, Juanes & Sebastian Krys, album producers; Emmanuel Briceño Vera, Vago Galindo, Juanes, Sebastian Krys & José López, album recording engineers; Vago Galindo & Sebastian Krys, album mixers; Juanes, songwriter; Brian Lucey, album mastering engineer); De Todas las Flores – Natalia Lafourcade (Adan Jodorowsky & Natalia Lafourcade, album producers; Gerardo Ordoñez, album recording engineer; Gerardo Ordoñez, album mixer; Natalia Lafourcade, songwriter; Bernie Grundman, album mastering engineer); Play – Ricky Martin (Kevyn Cruz, Luis Miguel Gómez "Casta", Jc Entertainment, L.E.X.U.Z & Jean Rodríguez, album producers; Enrique LaReals, Sergio Robledo & Jean Rodriguez, album recording engineers; Jaycen Joshua, album mixer; Kevyn Cruz, Ricky Martin & Luis Angel Oneill Laureano, songwriters; Jaycen Joshua, album mastering engineer); EADDA9223 – Fito Páez (Gustavo Borner, Diego Olivero & Fito Páez, album producers; Gustavo Borner, Phil Levine & Diego Olivero, album recording engineers; Gustavo Borner, album mixer; Rodolfo Páez, songwriter; Justin Moshkevich, album mastering engineer); Escalona Nunca Se Había Grabado Así – Carlos Vives (Andrés Leal, Luis Ángel Pastor & Carlos Vives, album producers; Andrés Borda & Francisco Castro, album recording engineers; Javier Garza, album mixer; Rafael Calixto Escalona Martínez, songwriter; Felipe Tichauer, album mastering engineer)
2024	Juan Luis Guerra 4.40 · Juan Luis Guerra & Janina Rosado, album producers · Allan Leschhorn, album recording engineer · Allan Leschhorn, album mixer · Juan Luis Guerra, songwriter · Adam Ayan, album mastering engineer	Radio Güira	Bolero – Ángela Aguilar (Pepe Aguilar & Cheche Alara, album producers; Norberto Islas & Peter Mokran, album recording engineers; Peter Mokran, album mixer; Bernie Grundman, album mastering engineer); cuatro – Camilo (Camilo, album producer; Oscar Convers, Frank Fuentes, Nico González, Natalia Ramírez, Nicolás Ramírez & Daniel Uribe, album recording engineers; Nico González & Nicolás Ramírez, album mixers; Camilo, songwriter; Adam Ayan, album mastering engineer); Xande Canta Caetano – Xande de Pilares (Pretinho Da Serrinha, album producer; Igor Ferreira, album recording engineer; Igor Ferreira, album mixer; Caetano Veloso, songwriter; Alexandre Rabaço, album mastering engineer); Mañana Será Bonito (Bichota Season) – Karol G (Sky Rompiendo, album producer; Joel Iglesias, album recording engineer; Josh Gudwin & Joel Iglesias, album mixers; Karol G, Ovy on the Drums & Sky Rompiendo, songwriters; Dave Kutch, album mastering engineer); García – Kany García (Rafa Arcaute & Richi López, album producers; Rafa Arcaute & Richi López, album recording engineers; Lewis Pickett, album mixer; Rafa Arcaute, Kany García, Richi López & Juan Morelli, songwriters; Felipe Tichauer, album mastering engineer); Autopoiética – Mon Laferte (Manú Jalil & Mon Laferte, album producers; Isaí Araujo, Manú Jalil, Daniel Martínez, Joel Orta Oviedo & Pablo Rojas, album recording engineers; Ignacio Sotelo, album mixer; Mon Laferte, songwriter; Chalo González, album mastering engineer); Boca Chueca, Vol. 1 – Carín León (Israel Aispuro Meneses & Orlando Aispuro Meneses, album producers; Israel Aispuro Meneses & Orlando Aispuro Meneses, album recording engineers; Alberto Medina, album mixer; Edgar Barrera, songwriter; Alberto Medina, album mastering engineer); Las Letras Ya No Importan – Residente (Residente, album producer; Beatriz Artola, album recording engineer; Beatriz Artola, album mixer; Leo Genovese, Jeffrey Peñalva & Residente, songwriters; Ted Jensen, album mastering engineer); Las Mujeres Ya No Lloran – Shakira (Alberto Carlos Melendez & Shakira, album producers; Dave Clauss, Roger Rodés & Dani Val, album recording engineers; Dave Clauss, album mixer; Kevyn Mauricio Cruz, Alberto Carlos Melendez & Shakira, songwriters; Adam Ayan, album mastering engineer)
2025	Bad Bunny · Roberto José Rosado Torres, Mag & Marcos Masis, album producers · Antonio Caraballo & Roberto José Rosado Torres, album recording engineers · Josh Gudwin, album mixer · Bad Bunny, MAG, Marcos Masis & Roberto José Rosado Torres, songwriters · Colin Leonard, album mastering engineer	Debí Tirar Más Fotos	Cosa Nuestra – Rauw Alejandro (Rauw Alejandro, Jorge Pizarro & Nino Karlo Segarra, album producers; Jorge Pizarro, album recording engineer; Josh Gudwin, album mixer; Rauw Alejandro, Christhian Daniel Mojica, Jorge Pizarro & Nino Karlo Segarra, songwriters; Chris Gehringer, album mastering engineer); Papota – Ca7riel & Paco Amoroso (Rafa Arcaute, Ignacio Cruz, Danny Flores, Jean Rodriguez & Federico Vindver, album producers; Rafa Arcaute, Luis Tomás La Madrid, Josh Newell & Federico Vindver, album recording engineers; Rafa Arcaute, Felipe Bernal, Josh Newell, Lewis Pickett & Federico Vindver, album mixers; Rafa Arcaute, Gino Borri, Ca7riel & Paco Amoroso, Vicente Jiménez & Federico Vindver, songwriters; Josh Newell & Lewis Pickett, album mastering engineers); Raíces – Gloria Estefan (Emilio Estefan, Jr., album producer; Carlos Alvarez, Dave Poler & Andres Varona, album recording engineers; Carlos Alvarez, album mixer; Emilio Estefan, Jr., songwriter; Mike Fuller, album mastering engineer); Puñito de Yocahú – Vicente García (Eduardo Cabra & Vicente García, album producers; Eduardo Cabra, Vicente García & Harbey Marín, album recording engineers; Harold Wendell Sanders, album mixer; Vicente García, songwriter; Diego Calviño, album mastering engineer); Al Romper la Burbuja – Joaquina (Joaquina & Julio Reyes Copello, album producers; Santiago Borja, Joaquina, Natalia Ramirez, Robin Reumers, Julio Reyes Copello, Daniel Riaño Restrepo & Natalia Schesinger, album recording engineers; Lee Smith, album mixer; Joaquina, songwriter; Ted Jensen, album mastering engineer); Cancionera – Natalia Lafourcade (Adán Jodorowsky & Natalia Lafourcade, album producers; Jack Lahana, album recording engineer; Jack Lahana, album mixer; Natalia Lafourcade, songwriter; Bernie Grundman, album mastering engineer); Palabra de To's (Seca) – Carín León (Alberto de Jesús Medina Velásquez & Antonio de Jesús Zepeda Rivera, album producers; Alberto de Jesús Medina Velásquez, album recording engineer; Alberto de Jesús Medina Velásquez, album mixer; Carín León, songwriter; Alberto Medina, mastering engineer); Caju – Liniker (Julio Fejuca, Liniker & Gustavo Ruiz Chagas, album producers; Julio Fejuca, Daniel Mariano Gonçalves, André Malaquias, João Milliet, Gustavo Ruiz Chagas & Eric Yoshino, album recording engineers; João Milliet, album mixer; Liniker, songwriter; Felipe Tichauer, album mastering engineer); En las Nubes - Con Mis Panas – Elena Rose (Luis Miguel Gómez Castaño, Richi López & Manuel Lorente Freire, album producers; Richi López, Frank Lozano, Alfonso Pérez & Felipe Trujillo, album recording engineers; Lewis Pickett, album mixer; Luis Miguel Gómez Castaño, Richi López, Manuel Lorente Freire & Alejandro Sanz, songwriters; David Kutch, album mastering engineer)
2026	Rosalía; Noah Goldstein, David Rodríguez, Rosalía & Dylan Wiggins, album producers; Daniel Cayotte, Isaac Diskin, Tristan Hoogland, Jake Miller, David Rodríguez & Harry Wilson, album recording engineers; Manny Marroquin, album mixer; Noah Goldstein, David Rodríguez, Rosalía & Dylan Wiggins, songwriters; Bob Jackson & Brian Lee, album mastering engineers	Lux (Complete Works)	Equilibrivm – Anitta; Jean Rodriguez, album producer; Raphael Rui Castro, album recording engineer; Rafael Fadul, Marcelinho Ferraz, Arthur Luna, Jean Rodriguez & Luciano Scalercio, album mixers; Anitta, Carolina Marcilio, Jennifer Mosello & Cinthya Ribeiro Dos Santos, songwriters; Felipe Tichauer, album mastering engineer; Free Spirits – Ca7riel & Paco Amoroso; Rafa Arcaute & Federico Vindver, album producers; Rafa Arcaute, Julio Gómez & Federico Vindver, album recording engineers; Lewis Pickett, album mixer; Rafa Arcaute, Gino Borri, Ca7riel & Paco Amoroso, Vicente Jimenez "Vibarco" & Federico Vindver, songwriters; Lewis Pickett, album mastering engineer; Taracá – Jorge Drexler; Facundo Balta, Jorge Drexler, Mauro, Lucas Piedra Cueva & Tadu Vázquez, album producers; Lucas Piedra Cueva, album recording engineer; Carles Campi Campón, album mixer; Jorge Drexler & Mauro, songwriters; Fred Kevorkian, album mastering engineer; Vendrán Suaves Lluvias – Silvana Estrada; Daniel Bitran Arizpe, Edwin Erazo & Silvana Estrada, album producers; Daniel Bitran Arizpe, Leonel Carmona, Warren Spicer & JC Vertti, album recording engineers; Daniel Bitran Arizpe, album mixer; Silvana Estrada, songwriter; Ryan Smith, album mastering engineer; Tropicoqueta – Karol G; Edgar Barrera & Karol G, album producers; Edgar Barrera & Joel Iglesias, album recording engineers; Josh Gudwin & Joel Iglesias, album mixers; Edgar Barrera, Andrés Jael Correa Ríos & Karol G, songwriters; Dave Kutch, album mastering engineer; Femme Fatale – Mon Laferte; Manú Jalil & Mon Laferte, album producers; Sebastián Aracena, Isaí Araujo, Manú Jalil, Nacho Sotelo & Jorge Valdés, album recording engineers; Nacho Sotelo, album mixer; Mon Laferte, songwriter; Nacho Sotelo, album mastering engineer; Muda – Carín León; Edgar Barrera & Luis Miguel Gómez Castaño, album producers; Edgar Barrera, Luis Miguel Gómez Castaño, Alberto Medina, Abraham Eduardo Tapia García & Antonio Zepeda, album recording engineers; Alberto Medina, album mixer; Edgar Barrera, Andrés Jael Correa Ríos, Luis Miguel Gómez Castaño, Carín León, Manuel Lorente Freire & Daniel Rondón, songwriters; Alberto Medina, album mastering engineer; La Vida Era Más Corta – Milo J; Santiago Alvarado, Milo J & Santiago Ruiz, album producers; Luciano Nicolas Gordillo, album recording engineer; Jon Castelli, album mixer; Santiago Alvarado, Milo J & Santiago Ruiz, songwriters; Dale Becker, album mastering engineer; ¿Dónde es el After? – Rawayana; Luis Miguel Gómez Castaño, Héctor Mazzarri & Andrés Story, album producers; Adam Burt, Felix Byrne, Luis Miguel Gómez Castaño, Katie Harvey, Héctor Mazzarri & Andrés Story, album recording engineers; Josh Gudwin, album mixer; Alejandro Abeijón, Luis Miguel Gómez Castaño, Héctor Mazzarri, Alberto Montenegro, Daniel Rondón & Andrés Story, songwriters; Dale Becker, album mastering engineer

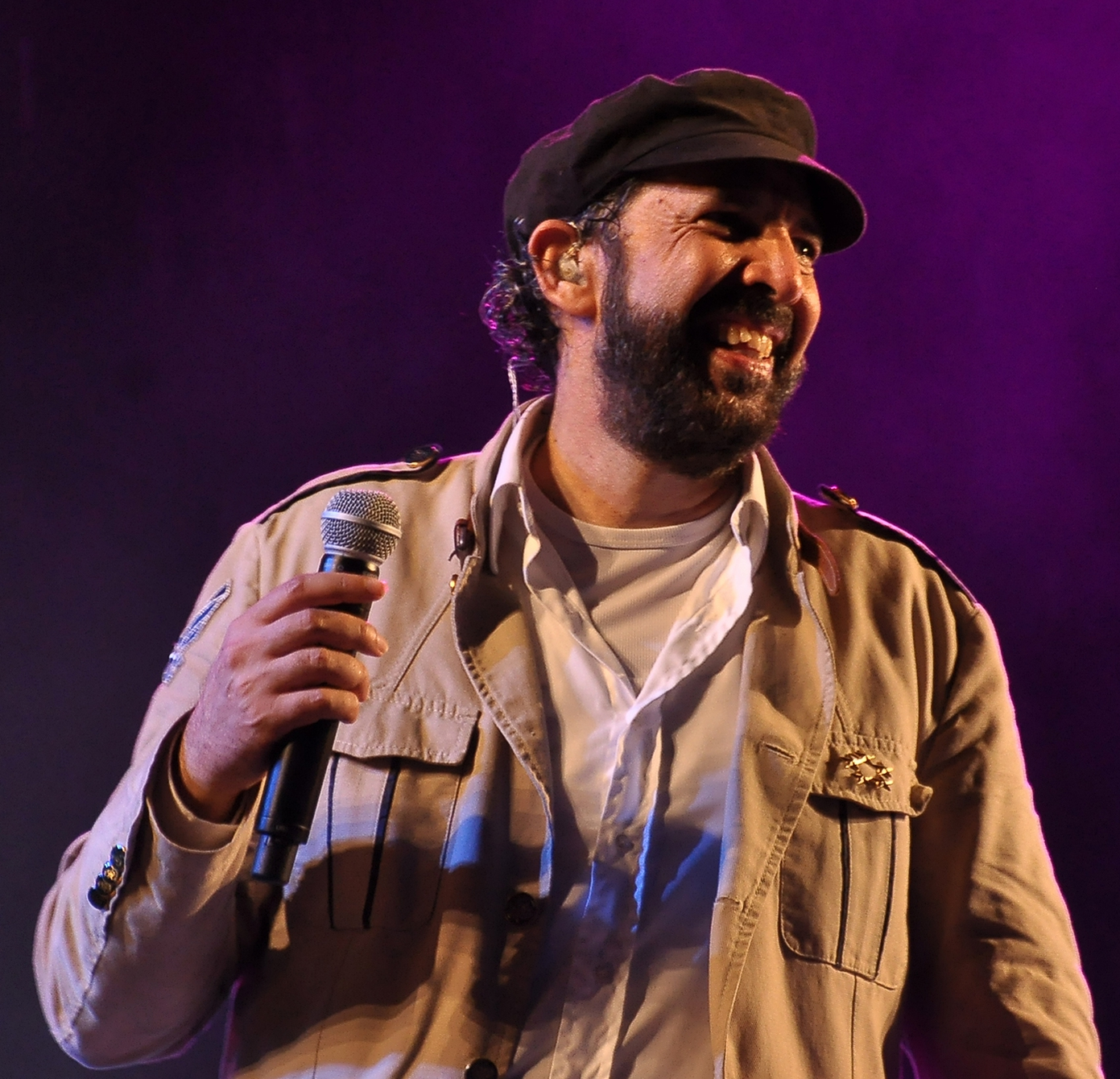
Juan Luis Guerra has won the most in this category with 5 wins.

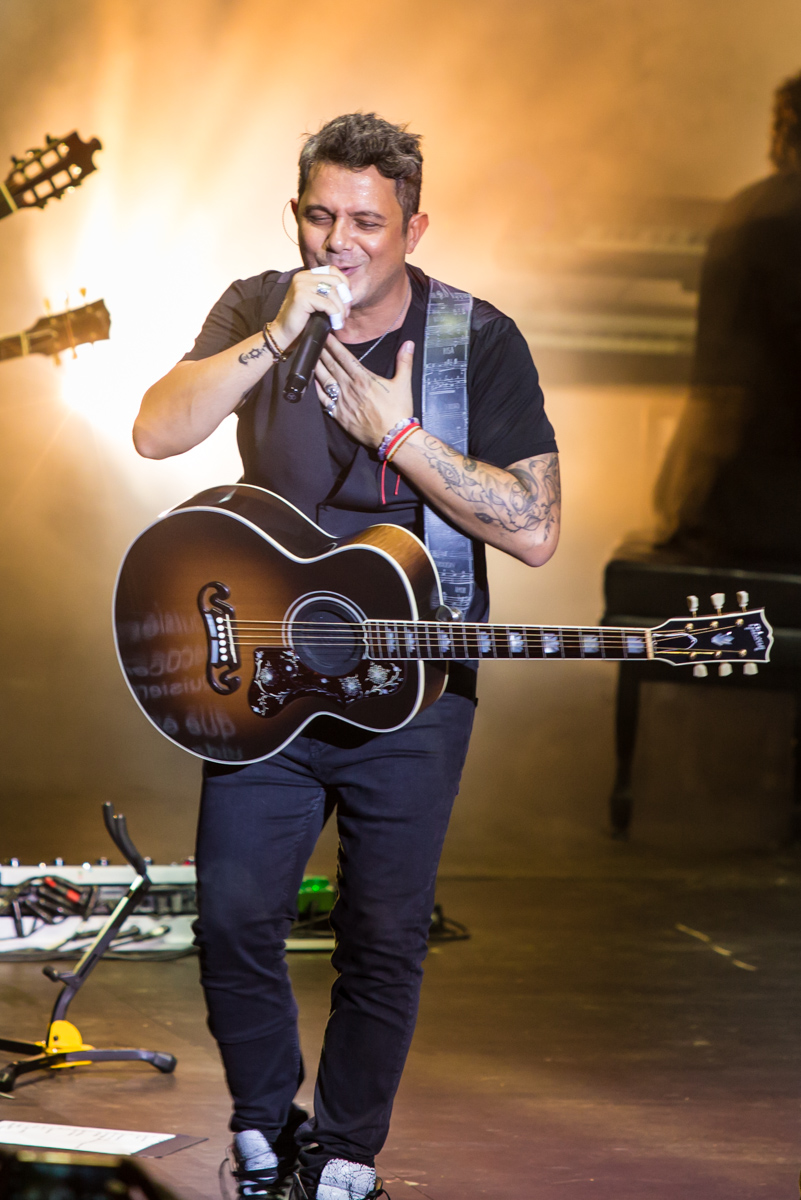
Alejandro Sanz won Album Of The Year 3 times.

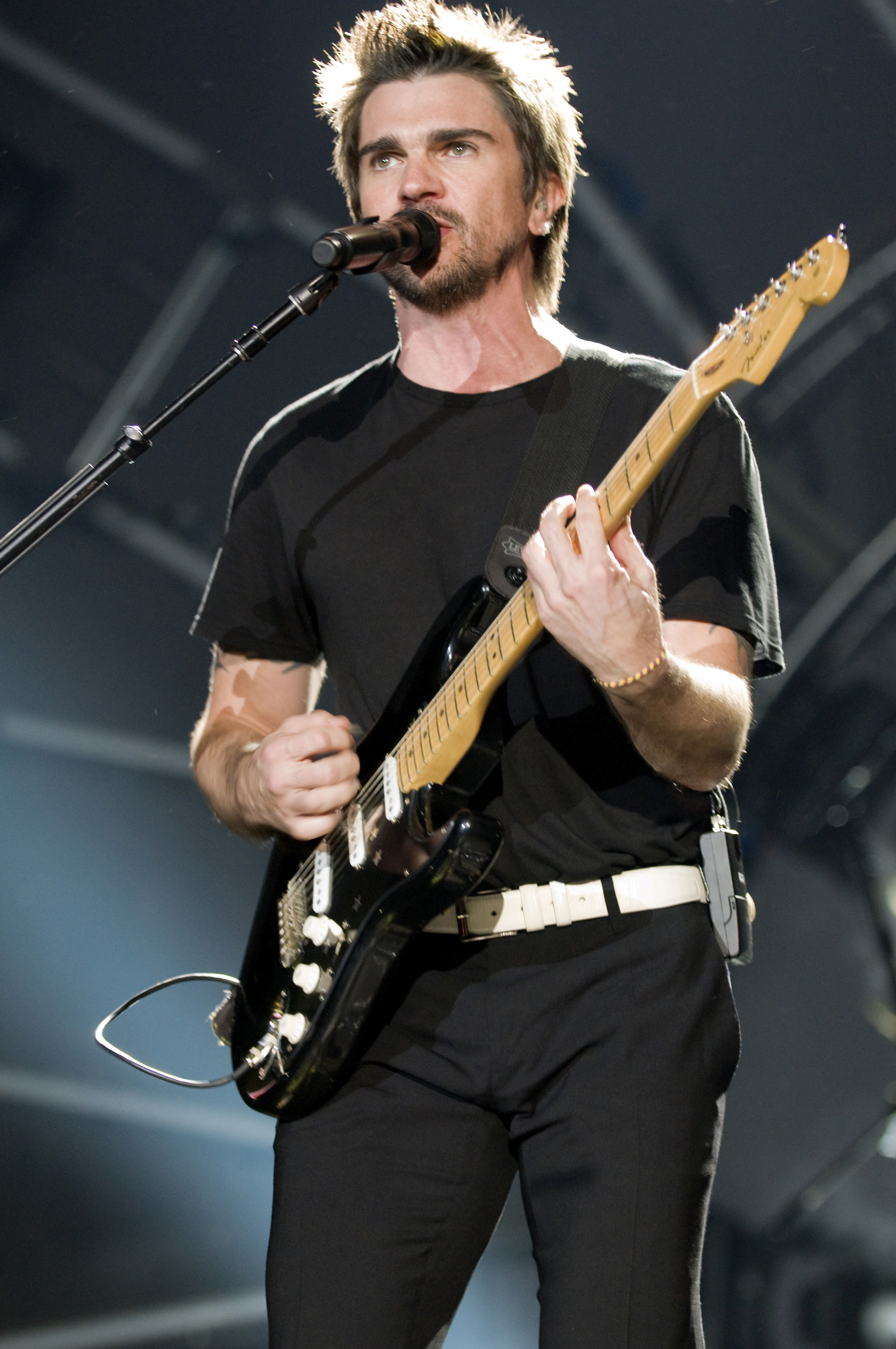
Juanes has won this award 3 times.

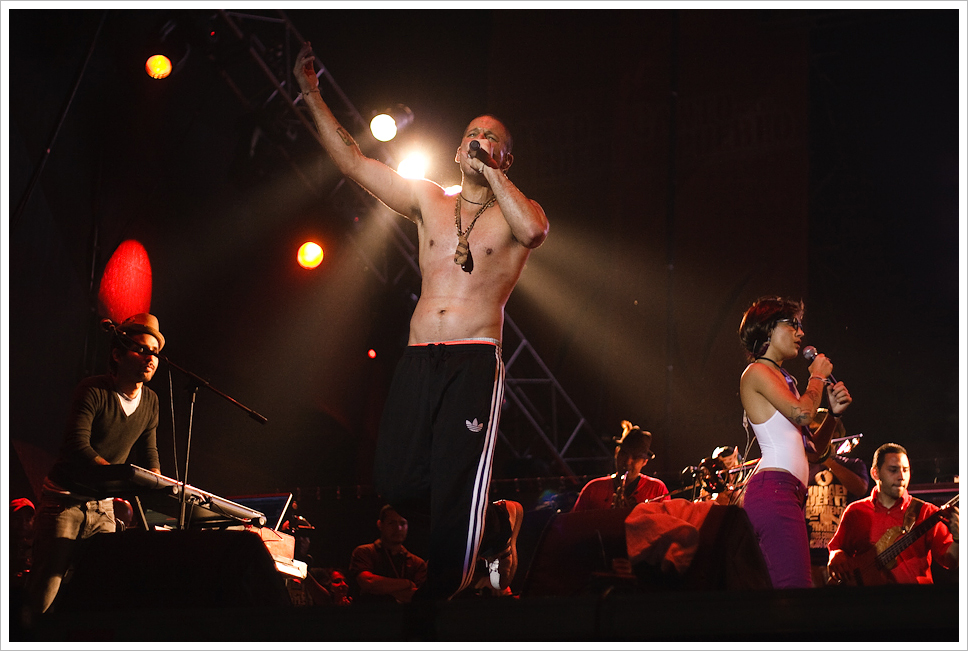
Calle 13, 2-time winner.

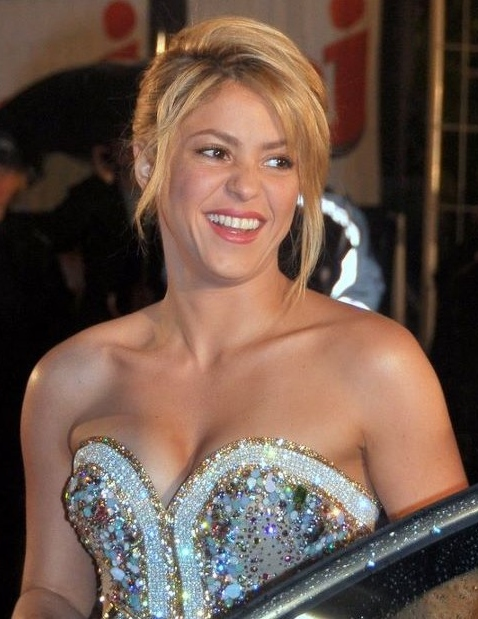
Shakira's the first female recipient of this award in 2006.

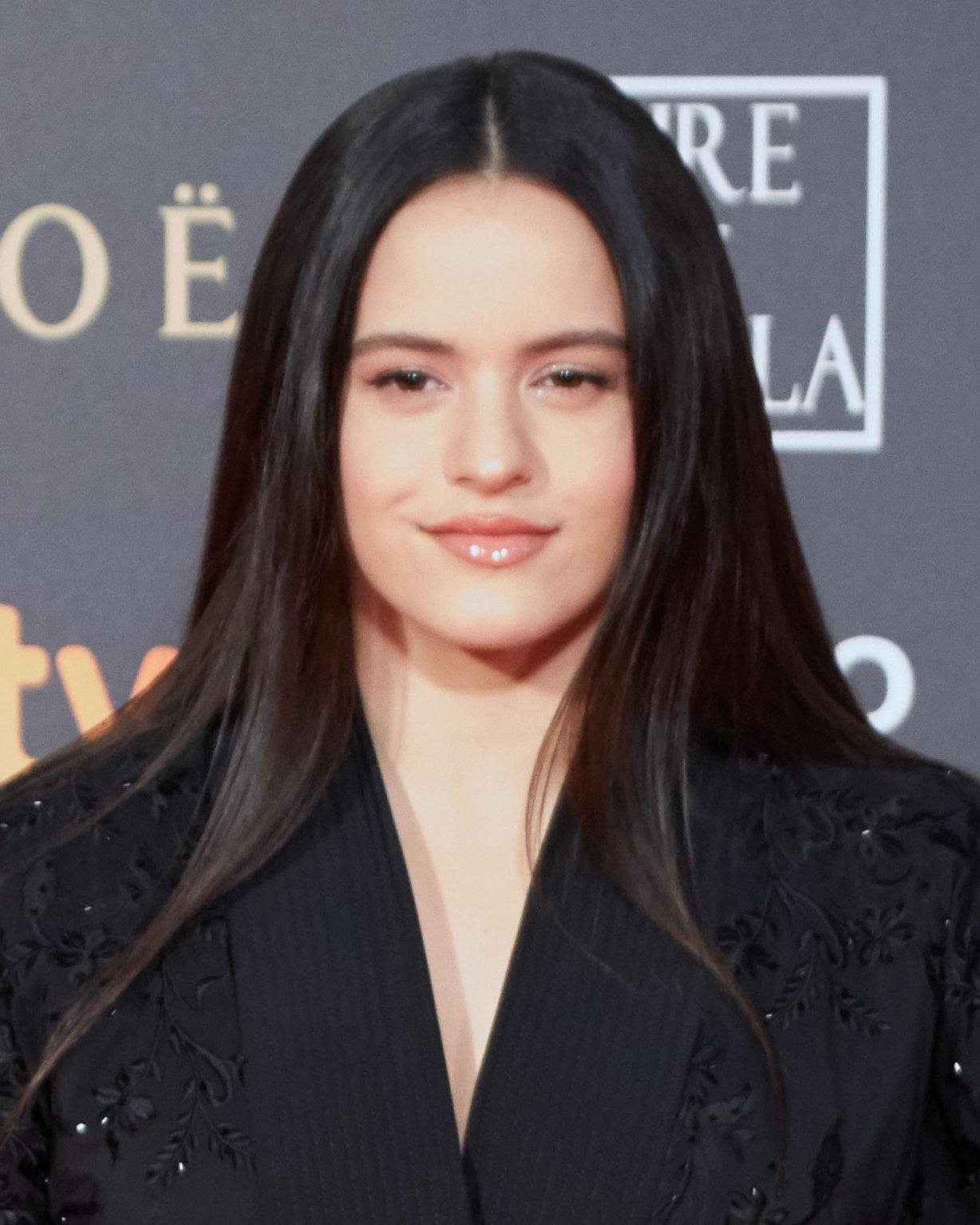
Rosalía is the first female artist to win this award twice and thrice, in 2019 and 2022 and 2026.

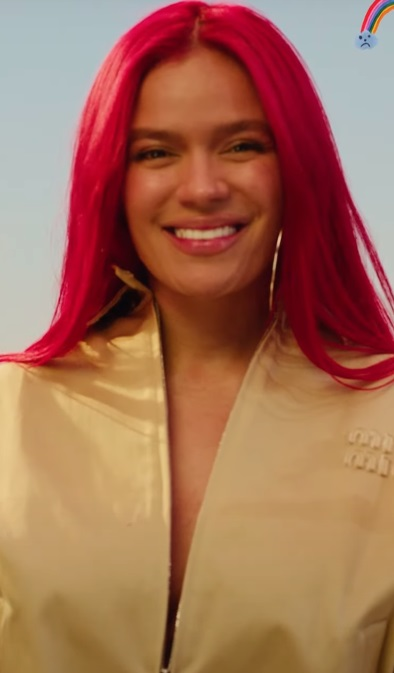
Karol G, 2023 award winner.

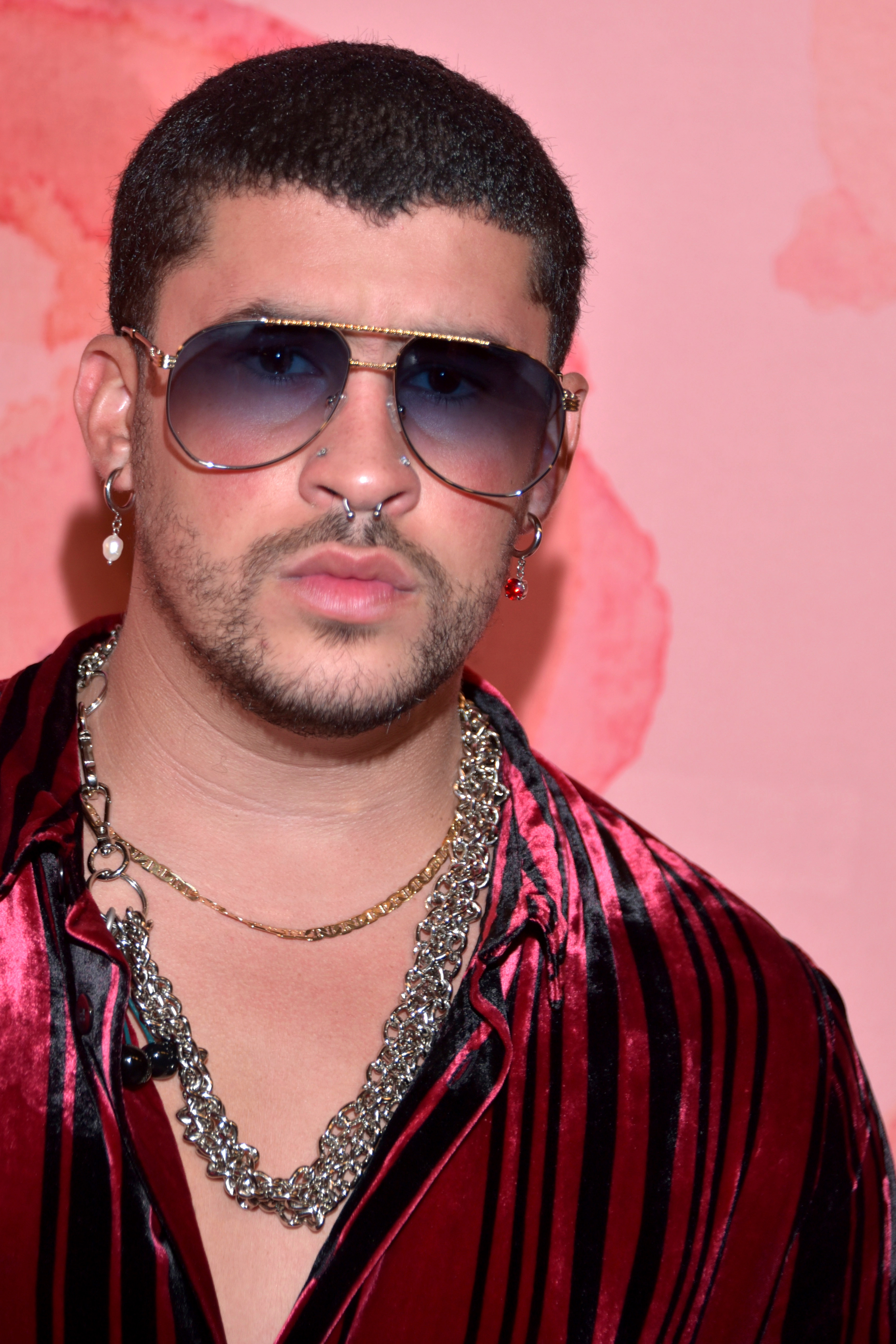
2025 Winner, Bad Bunny.

== See also ==
- Grammy Award for Album of the Year.
- Billboard Latin Music Award for Top Latin Album of the Year.

== Notes ==
^{^[I]}Each year is linked to the article about the Latin Grammy Awards held that year.^{^[II]}Showing the name of the performer, the nominated album and in parentheses the record producer(s), engineers/mixer(s) and mastering engineer(s) name(s).
