= Gustavo Borner =

- Origin: Buenos Aires, Argentina
- Genres: Latin pop, Latin rock
- Occupations: Producer, recording engineer, mixer
- Years active: 1990–present

Gustavo Borner is an Argentine producer, engineer and mixer. He has worked with several artists both from Argentina like Fito Páez, Andrés Calamaro and León Gieco as well as from other countries of Latin America like Juanes, Ricky Martin and Pepe Aguilar, among others, he has also worked in several film and videogame scores such as Birdman, Guardians of the Galaxy Vol. 2 and Deadpool 2. For his work, Borner has received six Grammy Awards, fourteen Latin Grammy Awards and a Cinema Audio Society Award.

== Career ==
After finishing high school in Buenos Aires, Argentina in 1985, Borner went to Boston, United States to attend Berklee College of Music, graduating with a double major in Music Production and Engineering and Film Scoring. In 1989, he moved to Los Angeles, United States, where he has resided ever since, he began working as engineer with Argentine producer Bebu Silvetti in different albums by mainly Latin pop artists such as Luis Miguel, Plácido Domingo and Daniela Romo, among others.

During the 90s, he worked with several Argentine artists like Enanitos Verdes, Los Pericos, Los Auténticos Decadentes, La Renga and Los Calzones Rotos, allowing him to gain recognition within Latin America. In 1996, Borner opened Igloo Music Studios in Los Angeles, a set of studios destined to the recording and production of albums as well as film scores. Borner has worked in the score of several Walt Disney Company films, including Hercules (1997) and Tarzan (1999), working in the latter alongside Phil Collins for the recording of the songs in different languages.

Borner has participated in several albums from the MTV Unplugged series, including with artists like Juanes, Ricky Martin, Pepe Aguilar and Los Tigres del Norte. Additionally, he has collaborated in various live albums like Insoportablemente Vivo (2001) by La Renga, Hola/Chau (2000) by Los Fabulosos Cadillacs, En Vivo (2000) and En Vivo, Vol. 2 (2001) by Marco Antonio Solís and Hecho en México - En Vivo en el Palacio de los Deportes – 25 Aniversario (2012) by Los Autenticos Decadentes. For Juanes's MTV Unplugged (2012), Borner won Album of the Year as engineer, mixer and mastering engineer.

Aside from albums by singers, Borner has continued to work in several film scores like Rush Hour (1998) and its sequels, Watchmen (2009), Guardians of the Galaxy (2014) and Deadpool 2 (2018), amons others, as well as video game scores. For his work as scoring mixer in Alejandro Gonzalez Iñarritu's Birdman (2014), Borner won the Grammy Award for Best Score Soundtrack for Visual Media and the Cinema Audio Society Award for Outstanding Achievement in Sound Mixing for a Motion Picture – Live Action.

== Discography ==
Year	Title	Artist	Production	Technical	Writing/ Arrangements
1990	Si Estuvieras Conmigo (A)	Álvaro Torres		check	
1991	Amada Más Que Nunca (A)	Daniela Romo		check	check
1991	Romance (A)	Luis Miguel			check
1991	Eso es el Amor (A)	Eydie Gormé		check	
1992	Áve Fénix (A)	Raphael		check	
1992	De Mil Colores (A)	Daniela Romo		check	
1992	María Bonita (A)	Mijares		check	
1993	La Distancia (A)	Simone		check	check
1993	Aromas (A)	Alberto Cortez		check	
1993	Como las Alas al Viento (A)	Rocío Jurado		check	
1993	Vuelve Otra Vez (A)	María Sorté		check	
1994	De Mi Alma Latina (A)	Plácido Domingo		check	check
1994	Big Bang (A)	Enanitos Verdes		check	
1994	Fantasía (A)	Raphael		check	
1994	La Cita (A)	Daniela Romo		check	
1994	Pampas Reggae (A)	Los Pericos		check	
1995	Por un Mundo Nuevo (A)	Pacha		check	check
1995	Confesiones (A)	Pandora		check	check
1995	Jungla Ska (A)	Los Calzones Rotos		check	
1995	Mi Vida Loca (A)	Los Auténticos Decadentes		check	
1996	Aconcagua (El Gobierno de las Tribus) (A)	Los Calzones Rotos	check	check	
1996	Guerra Gaucha (A)	Enanitos Verdes		check	
1996	Bajo El Cielo Español (A)	Plácido Domingo		check	
1997	Orozco (A)	León Gieco	check	check	
1997	Vida Modelo (A)	Juana la Loca	check	check	
1997	Canciones que Amo (A)	Roberto Carlos		check	
1997	Hercules (A)	Various artists		check	
1998	Mystic Love	Los Pericos		check	
1998	Por Amor (A)	Plácido Domingo		check	
1999	Nectar (A)	Enanitos Verdes	check		
1999	En Concierto (A)	Timbiriche	check	check	
1999	Corazón Gitano (A)	Pimpinela		check	
1999	Tarzan (A)	Various artists		check	
2000	Hola/Chau (A)	Los Fabulosos Cadillacs		check	
2000	La Esquina del Infinito (A)	La Renga		check	
2000	En Vivo (A)	Marco Antonio Solís		check	
2001	Plástico (A)	Los Calzones Rotos	check	check	
2001	En Vivo, Vol. 2 (A)	Marco Antonio Solís		check	
2001	Bandidos Rurales (A)	León Gieco		check	
2001	Insoportablemente Vivo (A)	La Renga		check	
2003	A Modo Nuestro (A)	Pimpinela		check	
2003	De Viaje (A)	Sin Bandera		check	
2004	Lu (A)	Lu		check	
2004	MTV Unplugged (A)	Diego Torres		check	
2005	Frecuencia Extrema (A)	Los Calzones Rotos	check		
2005	Mundos Opuestos (A)	Ha*Ash		check	
2005	"Amor a Medias" (S)	Ha*Ash		check	
2005	Mañana (A)	Sin Bandera		check	
2005	Letters from Argentina (A)	Lalo Schifrin		check	
2005	Por Favor, Perdón y Gracias (A)	León Gieco		check	
2006	Andando (A)	Diego Torres		check	
2006	MTV Unplugged (A)	Ricky Martin		check	
2007	Empezar Desde Cero (A)	RBD	check		
2007	"Inalcanzable" (S)	RBD	check		
2007	Hasta Ahora (A)	Sin Bandera		check	
2007	Viento a Favor (A)	Alejandro Fernández		check	
2007	Lalo Schifrin and Friends (A)	Lalo Schifrin		check	
2008	MTV Unplugged (A)	Julieta Venegas		check	
2009	Lo que Soy (A)	Diego Schoening	check	check	check
2009	"Sal de Mi Piel" (S)	Belinda		check	
2009	No Sé Si Es Baires o Madrid (A)	Fito Páez		check	
2009	Primera Fila (A)	Thalía		check	
2009	Necesito de Ti (A)	Vicente Fernandez		check	
2009	Mariana Vega (A)	Mariana Vega		check	
2009	Watchmen (A)	Various artists		check	
2010	Panda MTV Unplugged (A)	PXNDX		check	
2010	Carpe Diem (A)	Belinda		check	
2010	No Hay Imposibles (A)	Chayanne		check	
2010	Afortunadamente No Eres Tú (A)	Paty Cantú		check	
2010	Alex, Jorge y Lena (A)	Alex, Jorge y Lena		check	
2011	MTV Unplugged: Los Tigres del Norte and Friends (A)	Los Tigres del Norte	check	check	
2011	Extranjera - Segunda Parte (A)	Dulce María	check	check	
2012	Hecho en México - En Vivo en el Palacio de los Deportes - 25 Aniversario (A)	Los Autenticos Decadentes		check	
2012	MTV Unplugged (A)	Juanes		check	
2013	Thalía (A)	Thalía		check	
2014	Sin Fronteras (A)	Dulce María		check	check
2014	Corazón – Live from Mexico: Live It to Believe It (A)	Santana		check	
2014	MTV Unplugged (A)	Pepe Aguilar		check	
2014	Guardians of the Galaxy (A)	Various artists		check	
2015	The Pale Emperor (A)	Marilyn Manson		check	
2016	Bosé MTV Unplugged (A)	Miguel Bosé		check	
2016	Electrop (A)	Miguel Mateos		check	
2016	Un Azteca en el Azteca, Vol. 1 (En Vivo) (A)	Vicente Fernandez		check	
2017	Guardians of the Galaxy Vol. 2 (A)	Various artists		check	check
2017	Feliz (A)	Nahuel Pennisi		check	
2018	Cargar la Suerte (A)	Andrés Calamaro	check	check	
2018	Deadpool 2 (A)	Various artists		check	check
2018	Amor Sin Límite (A)	Roberto Carlos		check	
2018	MTV Unplugged (A)	Molotov		check	
2019	Resurrección (A)	Hombres G		check	
2019	La Metamorfosis (A)	Reyli Barba		check	
2020	La Conquista del Espacio (A)	Fito Páez	check	check	

(A) Album, (S), Single

== Awards and nominations ==
=== Cinema Audio Society Awards ===
Year	Category	Nominated work	Result	Ref.
2014	Outstanding Achievement in Sound Mixing for a Motion Picture – Live Action	Birdman or (The Unexpected Virtue of Ignorance)	Won	
2014	Outstanding Achievement in Sound Mixing for a Motion Picture – Live Action	Guardians of the Galaxy	Nominated	

=== Grammy Awards ===
Year	Category	Nominated work	Artist	Result	Ref.
2010	Best Regional Mexican Album	Necesito de Ti (as engineer)	Vicente Fernandez	Won	
2012	Best Banda or Norteño Album	MTV Unplugged: Los Tigres del Norte and Friends (as engineer)	Los Tigres del Norte	Won	
2013	Best Latin Pop Album	MTV Unplugged: Deluxe Edition (as engineer)	Juanes	Won	
2016	Best Score Soundtrack for Visual Media	Birdman (as engineer)	Antonio Sánchez	Won	
2017	Best Regional Mexican Music Album (including Tejano)	Un Azteca en el Azteca, Vol. 1 (En Vivo) (as engineer)	Vicente Fernandez	Won	
2021	Best Latin Rock or Alternative Album	La Conquista del Espacio (as engineer)	Fito Páez	Won	

=== Latin Grammy Awards ===
Year	Category	Nominated work	Artist	Result	Ref.
2004	Best Pop Album by a Duo or Group with Vocal	De Viaje (as engineer)	Sin Bandera	Won	
2005	Album of the Year	MTV Unplugged (as engineer/mixer)	Diego Torres	Nominated	
2005	Best Engineered Album	MTV Unplugged (as engineer/mixer)	Diego Torres	Won	
2006	Album of the Year	Por Favor, Perdón y Gracias (as engineer/mixer)	León Gieco	Nominated	
2007	Album of the Year	MTV Unplugged (as engineer/mixer)	Ricky Martin	Nominated	
2007	Best Male Pop Vocal Album	MTV Unplugged (as engineer/mixer)	Ricky Martin	Won	
2007	Record of the Year	"Tu Recuerdo" (as engineer/mixer)	Ricky Martin	Nominated	
2008	Record of the Year	"El Presente" (as engineer/mixer)	Julieta Venegas	Nominated	
2008	Best Alternative Music Album	MTV Unplugged (as engineer/mixer)	Julieta Venegas	Won	
2009	Best Ranchero Album	Primera Fila (as engineer)	Vicente Fernández	Won	
2010	Best Ranchero Album	Necesito de Ti (as engineer)	Vicente Fernández	Won	
2011	Album of the Year	Alex, Jorge y Lena (as engineer/mixer)	Alex, Jorge y Lena	Nominated	
2011	Best Pop Album by a Duo or Group with Vocal	Alex, Jorge y Lena (as engineer/mixer)	Alex, Jorge y Lena	Won	
2011	Record of the Year	"Golpes en el Corazón" (as engineer/mixer)	Los Tigres del Norte featuring Paulina Rubio	Nominated	
2011	Best Norteño Album	MTV Unplugged: Los Tigres del Norte and Friends (as engineer/mixer)	Los Tigres del Norte	Won	
2011	Best Alternative Music Album	MTV Unplugged/Música de Fondo (as engineer/mixer)	Zoé	Won	
2012	Album of the Year	MTV Unplugged (as engineer/mixer and mastering engineer)	Juanes	Won	
2012	Record of the Year	"Azul Sabina" (as engineer/mixer)	Juanes and Joaquín Sabina	Nominated	
2012	Record of the Year	"Bésame Mucho" (as engineer/mixer)	Zoé	Nominated	
2012	Best Ranchero Album	Más de un Camino (as engineer/mixer)	Pepe Aguilar	Won	
2015	Album of the Year	MTV Unplugged (as engineer/mixer)	Pepe Aguilar	Nominated	
2018	Best Engineered Album	Feliz (as engineer/mixer)	Nahuel Pennisi	Nominated	
2019	Album of the Year	Cargar la Suerte (as engineer/mixer)	Andrés Calamaro	Nominated	
2019	Best Pop/Rock Album	Cargar la Suerte (as engineer/mixer)	Andrés Calamaro	Won	
2019	Record of the Year	"Verdades Afiladas" (as engineer/mixer)	Andrés Calamaro	Nominated	
2020	Album of the Year	La Conquista del Espacio (as engineer/mixer)	Fito Páez	Nominated	
2020	Best Pop/Rock Album	La Conquista del Espacio (as engineer/mixer)	Fito Páez	Won	
2022	Best Pop/Rock Album	Los Años Salvajes	Fito Páez	Won	
