= Inés Gaviria =

American singer-songwriter

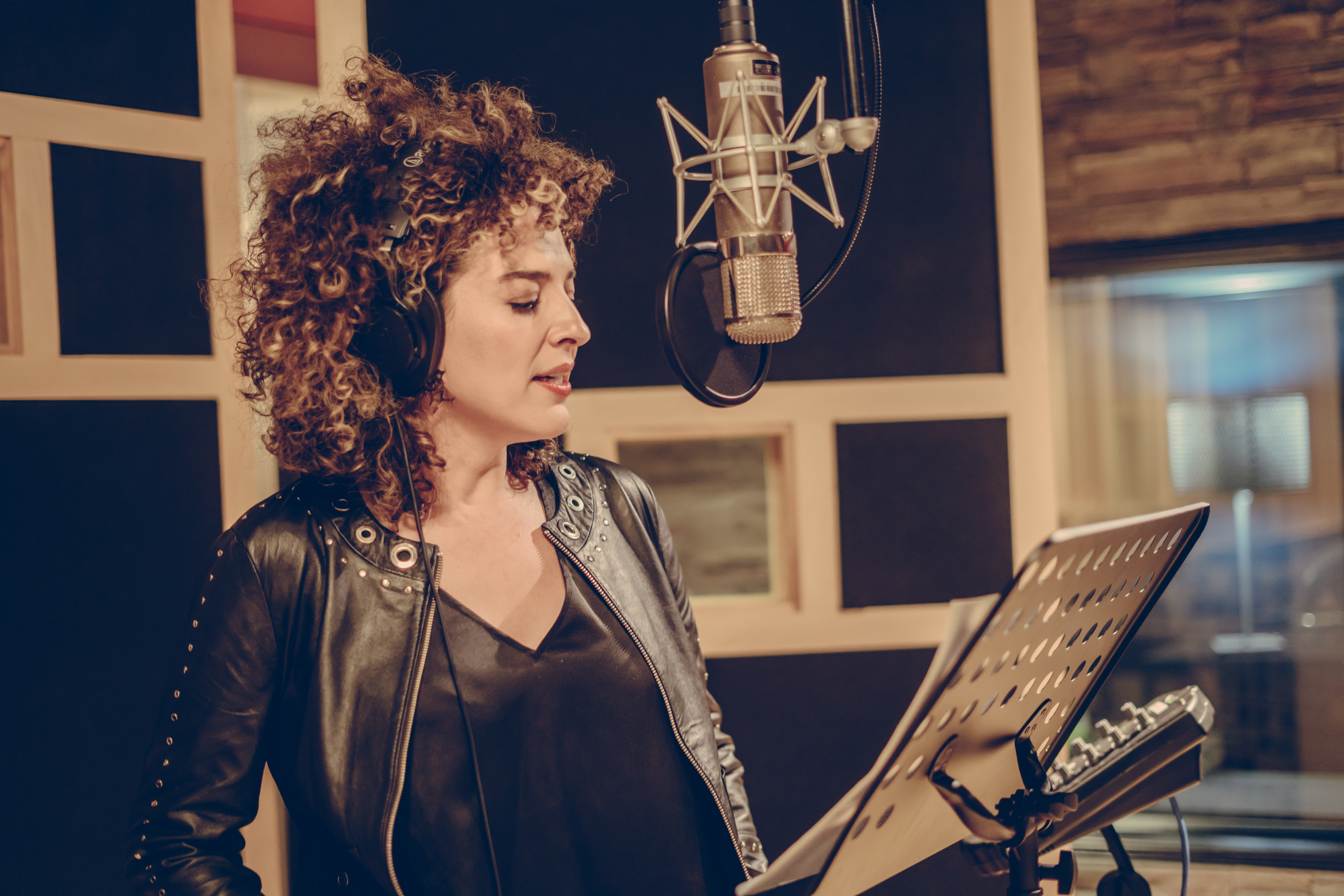

Background information
- Also known as: Inés Gaviria
- Born: July 12, 1979 (age 47)
- Origin: Miami, Florida, United States
- Genres: Latin pop, pop rock
- Occupations: Singer-songwriter, musician
- Instruments: Guitar, keyboards, vocals
- Years active: 2001–present
- Label: Universal Geffen

Inés Elvira Gaviria Escobar (born July 12, 1979) is a Colombian singer-songwriter based in Miami, Florida. Her first album with the Respek Label, and distributed by Universal Records, was released in June 2005. She was nominated for the 2006 Latin Grammy Awards. She is the sister of the Colombian producer and composer José Gaviria. Escobar is married to political scientist Alba Lucía Pava with whom she had a daughter named Salomé.

== Awards and nominations ==
=== Latin Grammy Awards ===
A Latin Grammy Award is an accolade by the Latin Academy of Recording Arts & Sciences to recognize outstanding achievement in the music industry.

Year	Nominee / work	Award	Result
2006	Inés Gaviria	Best New Artist	Nominated
2006	A Mi Manera	Best Female Pop Vocal Album	Nominated
