= Cargar la Suerte =

Studio album by Andrés Calamaro
- Released: November 2, 2018
- Recorded: 2018
- Studios: Sphere Studios, Los Angeles
- Genre: Pop rock
- Length: 42:54
- Label: Universal Music Spain
- Producer: Gustavo Borner

Andrés Calamaro chronology
| Volumen 11 (2016) | Cargar la Suerte (2018) | Dios los Cría (2021) |

Cargar la Suerte (English: Carry the Luck) is the fifteenth studio album by Argentine musician Andrés Calamaro, released on November 2, 2018, through Universal Music Spain. It was produced by Gustavo Borner and features collaborations from Germán Wiedemayer and Daniel Melingo.

At the 20th Annual Latin Grammy Awards, the album was nominated for Album of the Year and won Best Pop/Rock Album while the song "Verdades Afiladas" was nominated for Record of the Year and won Best Rock Song. Additionally, at the 21st Annual Gardel Awards the album was nominated for Album of the Year and won Best Male Rock Album while "Verdades Afiladas" was nominated for Song of the Year.

== Background ==
The album was recorded at Sphere Studios in Los Angeles, United States, it was produced by Gustavo Borner and featured arrangements and lyrics by Germán Wiedemayer, it also featured collaboration from Daniel Melingo, former member of the Argentine band Los Abuelos de la Nada, in the fifth track "Siete Vidas". The name of the album comes from the Spanish expression "cargar la suete", used in bullfighting, literally translated to "carry the luck" in English the expression refers to the position in which the bullfighter approaches the bull, according to Calamaro "cargar la suerte means to put yourself in the way of the bull with your body, to put the leg in front to provoque the bull from close". The first single of the album was "Verdades Afiladas", the music video for the song was directed by Diego Salpurido and features Calamaro a taxi driver.

The album was described as a "guitar album" due to its instrumentation, ranging from slower songs like the ballads "Mi Ranchera" and "Cuarteles de Invierno" to more upbeat songs such as "Adán Rechaza", "Siete Vidas", "Falso LV" and the proto-rap "Las Rimas", in the album Calamaro explores personal experiences and relationships like in "Tránsito Lento" about life while travelling, "My Mafia" dedicated to his friends and "Voy a Volver" about his natal country Argentina.

== Critical reception ==
Professional ratings
Review scores
| Source | Rating |
|---|---|
| Mondo Sonoro | 7/10 stars |

Iñaki Molinos from Mondo Sonoro gave the album a seven out of ten calling it "Calamaro's best work since the acclaimed La Lengua Popular (2007)", writing that "despite being scarce in terms of great singles or big hits, the exquisite production and interpretation of this work, the patience and dedication in each of the texts, the importance of the guitars and the always unfathomable emotion that Andrés preserves in his songs make his new work into a bang on the table".

== Track listing ==
All tracks were produced by Gustavo Borner.

Cargar la Suerte track listing
| No. | Title | Writer(s) | Length |
|---|---|---|---|
| 1. | "Verdades Afiladas" | Andrés Calamaro; German Weidemer | 3:46 |
| 2. | "Transito Lento" | Calamaro; Weidemer | 3:14 |
| 3. | "Cuarteles de Invierno" | Calamaro; Weidemer | 3:32 |
| 4. | "Diego Armando Canciones" | Calamaro; Weidemer | 3:33 |
| 5. | "Las Rimas" | Calamaro | 3:28 |
| 6. | "Siete Vidas" | Calamaro; Weidemer; Daniel Melingo | 3:18 |
| 7. | "Mi Ranchera" | Calamaro; Weidemer | 3:24 |
| 8. | "Falso LV" | Calamaro; Weidemer | 2:56 |
| 9. | "My Mafia" | Calamaro | 3:37 |
| 10. | "Adan Rechaza" | Calamaro | 2:47 |
| 11. | "Egoistas" | Calamaro; Weidemer | 3:23 |
| 12. | "Voy a Volver" | Calamaro; Weidemer | 5:50 |
| Total length: | | | 42:54 |

== Charts ==
Weekly chart performance for Cargar la Suerte
| Chart (2018) | Peak position |
|---|---|
| Spanish Albums (Promusicae) | 4 |
