= Por Favor, Perdón y Gracias =

Studio album by León Gieco
- Released: September 6, 2005
- Genre: Rock en Español
- Label: EMI
- Producer: León Gieco, Luis Gurevich

León Gieco chronology
Argentina Quiere Cantar (2003)	Por Favor, Perdón y Gracias (2005)	Orozco (2007)

Por Favor, Perdón y Gracias (Please, Sorry and Thanks) is an album released by Argentinean singer-songwriter León Gieco on September 6, 2005. The album earned Gieco Latin Grammy Award nominations for Album of the Year^{[I]} and Best Singer-Songwriter Album.

== Track listing ==
This information adapted from Allmusic.

No.	Title	Writer(s)	Length
1.	"Yo Soy Juan"	León Gieco, Luis Gurevich	4:58
2.	"Familia Rodante"	Gieco, Gurevich	5:32
3.	"Santa Tejerina"	Gieco, Gurevich	5:10
4.	"Al Atardecer"	Andrés Ciro Martínez	5:19
5.	"El Ángel de la Bicicleta"	Gieco, Gurevich	6:37
6.	"La Carneada"	Gieco, Gurevich	5:16
7.	"Ve la Luna"	Gurevich, Alicia Scherman	4:29
8.	"Los Guardianes de Mugica"	Gieco, Gurevich	6:03
9.	"Horal"	Gurevich, Jaime Sabines	4:35
10.	"Sólo Figuras"	Walter Piancioli	3:07
11.	"Te Veo en el Sol"	Gieco, Nito Mestre	4:21
12.	"La Noche Se Abre a la Luna"	Gieco, Gurevich	4:29
13.	"Encuentros"	Gieco	6:35
14.	"Chileno y Argentino"	Gieco, Juan Pablo Francesconi, Abel Pintos, Ariel Pintos	6:08

^{^[I]} The nomination was shared with Luis Gurevich (producer), Osqui Amante, Gustavo Borner (engineers/mixers), and Tom Baker (mastering engineer).
