= Cinema Audio Society Awards 2014 =

US film and television awards ceremony

51st CAS Awards

February 14, 2015

Motion Picture – Live Action:
Birdman (or The Unexpected Virtue of Ignorance)
Motion Picture – Animated:
Big Hero 6

The 51st Cinema Audio Society Awards were held on February 14, 2015, in the Bunker Hill Ballroom of the OMNI Los Angeles Hotel at California Plaza, Los Angeles, honoring outstanding achievements in sound mixing in film and television of 2014.

== Winners and nominees ==
Outstanding Achievement in Sound Mixing for a Motion Picture – Live Action	Outstanding Achievement in Sound Mixing for a Motion Picture – Animated
Birdman (or The Unexpected Virtue of Ignorance) – Production Mixer: Thomas Varga; Re-recording Mixer: Jon Taylor, CAS; Re-recording Mixer: Frank A. Montaño; Scoring Mixer: Gustavo Borner; ADR Mixer: Jason Oliver; Foley Mixer: John Sanacore, CAS: American Sniper – Production Mixer: Walt Martin, CAS; Re-recording Mixer: Gregg Rudloff; Re-recording Mixer: John Reitz; Scoring Mixer: Robert Fernandez; ADR Mixer: Thomas J. O’Connell; Foley Mixer: James Ashwell; Guardians of the Galaxy – Production Mixer: Simon Hayes, CAS; Re-recording Mixer: Lora Hirschberg; Re-recording Mixer: Christopher Boyes; Scoring Mixer: Gustavo Borner; ADR Mixer: Doc Kane; Foley Mixer: Chris Manning; Interstellar – Production Mixer: Mark Weingarten, CAS; Re-recording Mixer: Gary A. Rizzo, CAS; Re-recording Mixer: Gregg Landaker; Scoring Mixer: Alan Meyerson, CAS; ADR Mixer: Thomas J. O’Connell; Foley Mixer: Mary Jo Lang, CAS; Unbroken – Production Mixer: David Lee; Re-recording Mixer: Jon Taylor, CAS; Re-recording Mixer: Frank A. Montaño; Scoring Mixer: Jonathan Allen; ADR Mixer: Paul Drenning, CAS; Foley Mixer: John Guentner	Big Hero 6 – Original Dialogue Mixer: Gabriel Guy, CAS; Re-recording Mixer: David E. Fluhr, CAS; Re-recording Mixer: Gabriel Guy, CAS; Scoring Mixer: Alan Meyerson, CAS; Foley Mixer: Mary Jo Lang, CAS: The Boxtrolls – Original Dialogue Mixer: Carlos Sotolongo; Re-recording Mixer: Tom Myers; Re-recording Mixer: Ren Klyce; Re-recording Mixer: Nathan Nance; Scoring Mixer: Nick Wollage; Foley Mixer: Mary Jo Lang, CAS; How to Train Your Dragon 2 – Original Dialogue Mixer: Tighe Sheldon; Re-recording Mixer: Randy Thom, CAS; Re-recording Mixer: Shawn Murphy; Re-recording Mixer: Brandon Proctor; Scoring Mixer: Shawn Murphy; Foley Mixer: Corey Tyler; The Lego Movie – Original Dialogue Mixer: Thomas J. O’Connell; Re-recording Mixer: Michael Semanick, CAS; Re-recording Mixer: Gregg Rudloff; Re-recording Mixer: Wayne Ashley; Scoring Mixer: Brad Haehnel; Foley Mixer: John Simpson; Penguins of Madagascar – Original Dialogue Mixer: Tighe Sheldon; Re-recording Mixer: Paul N. J. Ottosson, CAS; Scoring Mixer: Dennis Sands, CAS; Foley Mixer: Randy K. Singer, CAS

11th CAS Technical Achievement Award

- Production: Sound Devices, LLC – Dante and MADI Audio Recorder model 970
- Post-production: iZotope – RX4-Advanced

CAS Honorary Awards

- CAS Student Recognition Awards – Danny Maurer, University of Colorado Denver
