= 7th Annual Latin Grammy Awards =

Music awards presented Nov 2006

7th Latin Grammy Awards
- Date: November 2, 2006
- Venue: Madison Square Garden, New York
- Hosted by: Lucero and Víctor Manuelle

Highlights
- Person of the Year: Ricky Martin

Television/radio coverage
- Network: Univision

The 7th Annual Latin Grammy Awards were held for the first time in New York City, NY. The awards show was held at Madison Square Garden on Thursday, November 2, 2006. Shakira was the big winner winning Album of the Year, one of four awards that she won. She is the first female artist to win Record of the Year, Album of the Year, and Song of the Year.

== Awards ==
Winners are in bold text.

=== General ===
Record of the Year

Shakira featuring Alejandro Sanz — "La Tortura"

- Ricardo Arjona — "Acompáñame A Estar Solo"
- Fonseca — "Te Mando Flores"
- Sérgio Mendes featuring The Black Eyed Peas — "Mas Que Nada"
- Julieta Venegas — "Me Voy"

Album of the Year

Shakira — Fijación Oral Vol. 1

- Gustavo Cerati — Ahí vamos
- Chayanne — Cautivo
- León Gieco — Por Favor, Perdón y Gracias
- Julieta Venegas — Limón y Sal

Song of the Year

Luis F. Ochoa and Shakira — "La Tortura" (Shakira featuring Alejandro Sanz)

- Ricardo Arjona — "Acompáñame A Estar Solo"
- Pablo Manavello and Ricardo Montaner — "Cuando A Mi Lado Estas" (Ricardo Montaner)
- Amaury Gutiérrez — "Nada Es Para Siempre" (Luis Fonsi)
- Lena — "Tu Corazón" (Lena featuring Alejandro Sanz)

Best New Artist

Calle 13

- Céu
- Inés Gaviria
- Lena
- Pamela Rodríguez

=== Best Female Pop Vocal Album ===
Shakira — Fijación Oral Vol. 1

- Anaís — Así Soy Yo
- Inés Gaviria — A Mi Manera
- Niña Pastori — Joyas Prestadas
- Rosario — Contigo Me Voy
- Thalía — El Sexto Sentido: Re+Loaded

Best Male Pop Vocal Album

Ricardo Arjona — Adentro

- Andrea Bocelli — Amor
- Chayanne — Cautivo
- Luis Fonsi — Paso a Paso
- Ricardo Montaner — Todo y Nada

Best Pop Album by a Duo/Group with Vocals

La Oreja de Van Gogh — Guapa

- Belanova — Dulce Beat
- La 5ª Estación — Acústico
- RBD — Nuestro Amor
- Servando y Florentino — Servando y Florentino
- Sin Bandera — Mañana

=== Urban ===
Best Urban Music Album

Calle 13 — Calle 13

- Daddy Yankee — Barrio Fino En Directo
- Don Omar — King of Kings
- Wisin & Yandel — Pa'l Mundo

=== Rock ===
Best Rock Solo Vocal Album

Gustavo Cerati — Ahí Vamos

- Belen Arjona — Infinito
- Fabiana Cantilo — Inconsciente Colectivo
- Alejandra Guzmán — Indeleble
- Ariel Rot — Ahora Piden Tu Cabeza

Best Rock Album by a Duo/Group with Vocals

Natalia y La Forquetina — Casa

- Black Guayaba — Lo Demas es Plastico
- Motel — Motel
- Polbo — Polbo
- Rata Blanca — La Llave de la Puerta Secreta

Best Alternative Music Album

Julieta Venegas — Limón y Sal

- Babasónicos — Anoche
- Café Tacuba — Un Viaje
- Nortec Collective — Tijuana Sessions Vol. 3
- Pastora — La Vida Moderna

Best Rock Song

Gustavo Cerati — "Crimen"

- Chetes — "Completamente"
- Rodrigo Dávila — "Dime Ven" (Motel)
- Jorge Pardo — "Un Dia No Vuelvo A Empezar"
- Mario Domm and Alejandra Guzmán — "Volverte a Amar" (Alejandra Guzmán)

=== Tropical ===
Best Salsa Album

Gilberto Santa Rosa — Directo Al Corazón

- La India — Soy Diferente
- Víctor Manuelle — Decisión Unánime
- Tito Nieves — Hoy, Mañana y Siempre
- Gilberto Santa Rosa and El Gran Combo de Puerto Rico — Asi Es Nuestra Navidad

Best Merengue Album

Milly Quezada — MQ

- Grupo Mania — La Hora de la Verdad
- Eddy Herrera — Amor de Locos
- Limi-T 21 — Rankeao
- Johnny Ventura — 103 Boulevard

Best Cumbia/Vallenato Album

Los Hermanos Zuleta — Cien Días de Bohemia

- Alfa 8 — Yo Bailo Cumbia
- Binomio de Oro de América — Grafiti de Amor
- Jorge Celedón and Jimmy Zambrano — Grandes Exitos En Vivo
- Iván Ovalle — Veinte Años Después...

Best Contemporary Tropical Album

Olga Tañón — Una Nueva Mujer

- Cabas — Puro Cabas
- Ciclón — Ciclón
- Fonseca — Corazón
- Chichi Peralta — Más Que Suficiente

Best Traditional Tropical Album

Andy Montañez and Pablo Milanés — AM/PM Líneas Paralelas

- Chucho Avellanet — Esta Noche Está Para Boleros
- Juan de Marcos and the Afro-Cuban All Stars — Step Forward - The Next Generation
- Compay Segundo — Siempre Compay
- Melina León and Los Tri-O — Serenata En San Juan
- Plena Libre — Evolución

Best Tropical Song

Fonseca — "Te Mando Flores"

- Víctor Manuelle — "Dos Soneros, Una Historia" (Gilberto Santa Rosa and Víctor Manuelle)
- Yoel Henríquez and Jorge Luis Piloto — "Esa Boquita" (Tito Nieves)
- Víctor Manuelle — "I Love Salsa!" (N'Klabe)
- Cabas and Kike Santander — "La Cadena de Oro" (Cabas)

=== Singer-Songwriter ===
Best Singer-Songwriter Album

Pablo Milanés — Como un Campo de Maíz

- Chico Buarque — Carioca
- León Gieco — Por Favor, Perdón y Gracias
- Ivan Lins — Acariocando
- Joaquín Sabina — Alivio de Luto

=== Regional Mexican ===
Best Ranchero Album

Pepe Aguilar — Historias de Mi Tierra

- Ana Gabriel — Dos amores un amante
- Pablo Montero — A Toda Ley
- Lupillo Rivera — El Rey de las Cantinas
- Alicia Villarreal — Orgullo de Mujer

Best Banda Album

Joan Sebastian — Más Allá Del Sol

- Banda el Recodo — Hay Amor
- Graciela Beltrán — Rancherísimas Con Banda
- El Coyote y Su Banda Tierra Santa — Prohibido
- Los Horóscopos de Durango — Antes Muertas Que Sencillas

Best Grupero Album

Joan Sebastian — En El Auditorio Nacional

- Ana Bárbara — No Es Brujería
- Grupo Bronco — Por Ti
- Grupo Bryndis — Por Muchas Razones Te Quiero
- Guardianes del Amor — Decórame El Corazón

Best Tejano Album

La Mafia — Nuevamente

- Jimmy González & El Grupo Mazz — Mejor Que Nunca
- Las 3 Divas — Las 3 Divas
- Little Joe & La Familia — Chicanisimo
- Joe Posada — Amor y Fuego

Best Norteño Album

Los Tigres del Norte — Historias Que Contar

- Ramón Ayala y Sus Bravos Del Norte — Ya No Llores
- Palomo — Pasión
- Pesado — Tu Sombra
- Michael Salgado — Volver Volver

Best Tropical Regional Mexican Album

A.B. Quintanilla III & Los Kumbia Kings — Kumbia Kings Live

- DJ Kane — Capitulo II: Brinca
- Los Acosta — Amor y Delirio
- Los Ángeles de Charly — Cuando Te Enamoras
- Los Angeles Azules — Interpretan Éxitos de Juan Gabriel
- Tropical Panama — 13 Cumbias Revolucionadas

Best Regional Mexican Song

Edgar Cortazar, Ernesto Cortazar and Tony Melendez — "Aun Sigues Siendo Mia" (Conjunto Primavera)

- Mauricio L. Arriaga and J. E. Murgia — "Contra Viento y Marea" (Intocable)
- Freddie Martínez, Sr. — "Corazón De Fierro" (Jimmy González & El Grupo Mazz)
- Joan Sebastian — "Más Allá del Sol"
- Ana Gabriel — "Sin Tu Amor"

=== Instrumental ===
Best Instrumental Album

Bebo Valdés — Bebo

- Banda Mantiqueira — Terra Amantiquira
- Paquito D'Rivera — The Jazz Chamber Trio
- Luis Salinas — Luis Salinas y Amigos En España
- Mario Adnet & Zé Nogueira — Moacir Santos: Choros y Alegría

=== Traditional ===
Best Folk Album

Mercedes Sosa — Corazón Libre

- Quique Domenech and Alejandro Croatto — Con El Corazón...
- Grupo Renacer — Puerto Rico Te Saluda...
- Chango Spasiuk — Tarefero de Mis Pagos
- Cacho Tirao — La Guitarra Argentina
- Yoruba Andabo — Rumba En La Habana Con...

Best Tango Album

Various Artists — Café de Los Maestros

- Gerardo Gandini — Flores Negras Postangos En Vivo en Rosario Vol. II
- María Estela Monti — Ciudad Secreta
- Lalo Schifrin — Letters from Argentina

Best Flamenco Album

Diego El Cigala — Picasso En Mis Ojos

- Vicente Amigo — Un Momento En El Sonido
- Javier Limón — Limón
- Morente — Sueña La Alhambra
- Estrella Morente — Mujeres

=== Jazz ===
Best Latin Jazz Album

Gonzalo Rubalcaba — Solo

- Ed Motta — Aystelum
- Eddie Palmieri — Listen Here!
- Jovino Santos Neto — Roda Carioca
- Dave Valentin — World on a String

=== Christian ===
Best Christian Album (Spanish language)

Marcos Witt — Dios es Bueno

- Aline Barros — Aline
- Daniel Calveti — Vivo Para Ti
- Jesus Adrian Romero — El Aire de tu Casa

Best Christian Album (Portuguese language)

Aline Barros — Aline Barros y Cia

- Mara Maravilha — Jóia Rara
- Cristina Mel — As Canções da Minha Vida 15 Anos - Ao Vivo
- Soraya Moraes — Promessas
- Robson Nascimento — Tudo O Que Soul

=== Brazilian ===
Best Brazilian Contemporary Pop Album

Sérgio Mendes — Timeless

- Jota Quest — Até Onde Vai
- Los Hermanos — 4
- Margareth Menezes — Pra Você
- Marisa Monte — Infinito Particular
- Sandy & Junior — Sandy & Junior (2006)
- Ivete Sangalo — As Super Novas

Best Brazilian Rock Album

Os Paralamas do Sucesso — Hoje

- Barão Vermelho — MTV ao Vivo
- Charlie Brown Jr. — Imunidade Musical
- O Rappa — Acústico MTV
- Nando Reis — Sim e Não

Best Samba/Pagode Album

Marisa Monte — Universo ao Meu Redor

- Alcione — Uma Nova Paixão ao Vivo
- Martinho da Vila — Brasilatinidade ao Vivo
- Demônios da Garoa — Ao Vivo
- Jair Rodrigues — Alma Negra

Best MPB Album

Maria Rita — Segundo

- João Bosco — Obrigado, Gente!
- Ana Carolina and Seu Jorge — Ana e Jorge ao Vivo
- Gal Costa — Hoje
- Jane Duboc — Uma Voz... Uma Paixão
- Simone — Simone - Ao Vivo

Best Romantic Music Album

Roberto Carlos — Roberto Carlos

- Alaíde Costa — Tudo Que o Tempo Me Deixou
- Daniel — Amor Absoluto
- Leonardo — De Corpo e Alma
- Tânia Mara — Louca Paixão

Best Brazilian Roots/Regional Album

Chitãozinho & Xororó — Vida Marvada

- Frank Aguilar — Sou Brasileiro
- Banda Calypso — Volume 8
- Caju & Castanha — Levante a Taça
- Sérgio Reis — Para Toda a Família

Best Brazilian Song

Rodrigo Maranhão — "Caminho das Águas" (Maria Rita)

- Gigi — "Abalou" (Ivete Sangalo)
- Gilberto Gil — "Balé de Berlim"
- Arnaldo Antunes, Carlinhos Brown and Marisa Monte — "O Bonde do Dom" (Marisa Monte)
- Chico Buarque — "Ela Faz Cinema"

=== Children's ===
Best Latin Children's Album

Adriana Partimpim — Adriana Partimpim - O Show

- Griselle Bou, Victor Meléndez and Annette Bou — Canciones y Cantos-Juegos Infantiles del Folklore Puertorriqueño
- Tatiana — El Regalo 2
- Xuxa — Só Para Baixinhos 6

=== Classical ===
Best Classical Album

Michel Camilo and Ernest Martínez Izquierdo — Rhapsody In Blue

- Jeff Von Der Schmidt — Carlos Chávez: Complete Chamber Music Volume 3
- Manuel Barrueco and Victor Pablo Pérez — Concierto Barroco
- Edson Cordeiro — Contratenor
- Eduardo Marturet conducting the Berliner Symphoniker — Encantamento
- Mauro Senise and Jota Moraes — Tempo Caboclo

=== Recording Package ===
Best Recording Package

Laura Varsky — Café de Los Maestros (Various Artist)

- Alexandra Lahr — Live In Los Angeles (Los Pinguos)
- Omar Delgado — Productos Desaparecidos (La Pestilencia)
- Marcelo Kertész — Samba Passarinho (Péri)
- Fritz Torres and Jorge Verdin — Tijuana Sessions Vol. 3 (Nortec Collective)
- Edward Martínez — Timeless (Sérgio Mendes)

=== Production ===
Best Engineered Album

Gustavo Celis, Serban Ghenea, Mauricio Guerrero, Rob Jacobs, Kevin Killen, Dave Way and Vlado Meller — Fijación Oral Vol. 1 (Shakira)

- Valerio Calisse, Hernan Gatica, Humberto Gatica, Pierpaolo Guerrini, Alejandro Rodríguez, Jochen Van Der Saag and Vlado Meller — Amore (Andrea Bocelli)
- Cotô Guarino, Swami Junior, André "K-belo" Sangiácomo and Carlos Freitas — De Uns Tempos Pra Cá (Chico César)
- Duda Mello and Carlos Freitas — Jet - Samba (Marcos Valle)
- José Luis Crespo, Sancho Gómez Escobar, Joaquín Pizarro and Jesús N. Gómez — La Vida Moderna (Pastora)

Producer of the Year

Cachorro López

- Cesar Camargo Mariano
- Moogie Canazio
- Lenine and Maria Rita
- Gustavo Santaolalla

=== Music video ===
Best Short Form Music Video

Calle 13 — "Atrévete-te-te"

- Ricardo Arjona — "Mojado"
- Chayanne — "Te Echo de Menos"
- Shakira featuring Alejandro Sanz — "La Tortura"
- Julieta Venegas — "Me Voy"

Best Long Form Music Video

Bebo Valdés and Diego El Cigala — Blanco y Negro En Vivo
Café Tacuba — Un Viaje

- Daniela Mercury — Baile Barroco
- O Rappa — Acústico MTV
- Simone — Simone - Ao Vivo

=== Special awards ===
Lifetime Achievement Awards

- Graciela
- Paloma San Basilio
- León Gieco
- César Camargo Mariano
- Richie Ray & Bobby Cruz
- Alberto Vázquez
- Johnny Ventura

Trustees Awards

- Alejandro Quintero
- Rafael Escalona

== Performers ==
- Shakira featuring Alejandro Sanz — "La Pared / La Tortura"
- Ana Gabriel — "Siete Veces, Siete Más"
- Andrea Bocelli — "Bésame Mucho"
- Thalía — "Seducción"
- Maná featuring Juan Luis Guerra — "Labios Compartidos / Bendita tu luz / Oye Mi Amor"
- Luis Fonsi and Billy Gibbons — "Nada Es Para Siempre"
- Wisin & Yandel — "Pam Pam"
- Héctor el Father, Tonny Tun Tun, Ivy Queen and Wisin & Yandel — "Noche de Entierro (Nuestro Amor)"
- Ricky Martin featuring La Mari and Tommy Torres — "Tu Recuerdo / Pégate"
- Joan Sebastian — "Eso y Más / Más Allá del Sol"
- Juan Luis Guerra 440 — "Las Avispas"
- RBD — "Tras de Mí"
- Special salsa tribute performance by Willie Colón, Fania All-Stars, Anaís, Andy Montañez, Tito Nieves and Gilberto Santa Rosa — "Quimbara / Idilio / El Cantante (song) / La Conciencia / Un Verano en Nueva York / Mi Gente"

== Presenters ==
- Fonseca — presented Best Salsa Album
- Catalina Sandino Moreno and John Leguizamo — presented Best Short Form Music Video
- Calle 13 and Rosario — presented Best Pop Vocal Album, Duo or Group
- Adamari López — presented Song of the Year
- Sin Bandera — presented Best New Artist
- Galilea Montijo and Banda el Recodo — presented Best Tropical Song
- Miguel Bosé — presented People of the Year
- Gilberto Santa Rosa and Andy Montañez — presented Best Urban Music Album
- Marc Anthony — presented Record of the Year
- Paloma San Basilio and Paz Vega — presented Album of the Year
- Ricardo Montaner
- Jimmy Smits
- Olga Tañón
- Sofía Vergara
- Alejandra Barros
- Alexa Damian
- Los Horóscopos de Durango
- Lena
- Pablo Montero
- Ludwika Paleta
- Milly Quezada
- Johnny Ventura
- Anaís
- Alejandra Guzmán
- Los Tigres del Norte
