= Diego Torres discography =

- Studio albums: 8
- Compilation albums: 2
- Singles: 33
- Video albums: 2
- Music videos: 29

The discography of Diego Torres, an Argentine pop singer, consists of seven studio albums, one live album, one compilation album, thirty-three singles, twenty-nine music videos and two DVDs, certifications and sales are also included.

== Albums ==
=== Studio albums ===
Year	Album details	Peak chart positions					Certifications (sales threshold)
Year	Album details	^{US Latin}	^{US Pop}	^{ARG}	^{MEX}	^{SPA}	Certifications (sales threshold)
1992	Diego Torres: Released: June 8, 1992; Label: RCA	—	—	1	—	—	ARG: 2× Platinum
1994	Tratar de Estar Mejor: Released: November 22, 1994; Label: RCA	—	—	1	—	—	ARG: 6× Platinum
1996	Luna Nueva: Released: November 5, 1996; Label: RCA	—	—	1	—	—	
1999	Tal Cual Es: Released: August 24, 1999; Label: BMG Latin	—	—	1	—	—	ARG: Platinum
2001	Un Mundo Diferente: Released: November 19, 2001; Label: BMG Latin	—	—	1	—	—	
2006	Andando: Released: August 8, 2006; Label: Sony Music	63	—	1	—	9	
2010	Distinto: Released: May 4, 2010; Label: Universal	31	5	1	21	34	CHI: Gold
2015	Buena Vida: Released: October 9, 2015; Label: Sony Music	38	13	—	—	81	
2021	Atlántico a Pie: Released: May 28, 2021; Label: Sony Music	—	—	—	—	—	
2024	Mejor Que Ayer: Released: March 1, 2024; Label: Sony Music	—	—	—	—	—	
"—" denotes the album failed to chart or not released

=== Live albums ===
Year	Album details	Peak chart positions				Certifications (sales threshold)
Year	Album details	^{US Latin}	^{US Pop}	^{ARG}	^{MEX}	Certifications (sales threshold)
2004	MTV Unplugged: Released: May 4, 2004; Label: Sony Music	45	13	5	2	ARG: 4× Platinum; MEX: Platinum + Gold; MEX: Gold (DVD)
2020	Diego Torres Sinfónico: Released: December 4, 2020; Label: Sony Music	—	—	—	—	

=== Compilation albums ===
Year	Album details	Peak chart positions	
Year	Album details	^{MEX}	^{ARG}
2008	Un Cachito de Mí: Grandes Éxitos: Released: June 15, 2008; Label: Sony Music	—	—
2008	Todos Éxitos: Released: September 23, 2008; Label: Sony Music	94	12

=== Other albums ===
- 1991: Compañías Indias (with his former group La Marca)

=== DVDs ===
- 2003: Color Esperanza
- 2004: Diego Torres: MTV Unplugged (Live)

== Singles ==
=== 1990s ===
Year	Title	Peak chart positions				Album
Year	Title	US Latin	US Pop	US Trop	SPA	Album
1992	"Estamos Juntos"	—	—	—	—	Diego Torres
1992	"Puedo Decir Que Sí"	—	—	—	—	Diego Torres
1994	"Tratar de Estar Mejor"	—	14	—	—	Tratar de Estar Mejor
1994	"Deja de Pedir Perdón"	—	—	—	—	Tratar de Estar Mejor
1995	"San Salvador"	—	—	—	—	Tratar de Estar Mejor
1996	"Penélope"	16	5	16	—	Luna Nueva
1997	"No lo Soñé"	22	6	—	—	Luna Nueva
1997	"Sé Que Ya No Volverás"	15	1	16	—	Luna Nueva
1997	"Sé Que Hay Algo Más"	—	13	—	—	Luna Nueva
1998	"Alba" (with Ketama)	—	—	—	—	
1999	"La Última Noche"	31	14	40	—	Tal Cual Es
"—" denotes the single failed to chart or not released

=== 2000s ===
Year	Title	Peak chart positions				Album
Year	Title	US Latin	US Pop	US Trop	SPA	Album
2000	"Que Será"	26	17	28	—	Tal Cual Es
2000	"Dónde Van"	—	—	—	—	Tal Cual Es
2000	"Recuerda"	—	—	—	—	Tal Cual Es
2001	"Color Esperanza"	48	26	12	11	Un Mundo Diferente
2001	"Sueños"	—	—	—	—	Un Mundo Diferente
2002	"Que No Me Pierda"	—	—	—	—	Un Mundo Diferente
2002	"Perdidos en la Noche"	—	—	—	—	Un Mundo Diferente
2004	"Cantar Hasta Morir"	15	8	17	—	Diego Torres: MTV Unplugged
2004	"Tratar de Estar Mejor"	—	—	—	—	Diego Torres: MTV Unplugged
2004	"Sueños" (with Julieta Venegas)	—	—	—	—	Diego Torres: MTV Unplugged
2004	"Déjame Estar"	7	9	8	—	Diego Torres: MTV Unplugged
2006	"Abriendo Caminos" (with Juan Luis Guerra)	30	9	—	—	Andando
2006	"Andando"	—	—	—	—	Andando
2007	"Hasta Cuándo"	—	—	—	—	Andando
"—" denotes the single failed to chart or not released

=== 2010s ===
Year	Title	Peak chart positions						Certifications (sales thresholds)	Album
Year	Title	US Latin	US Pop	US Trop	SPA	VEN	VEN Latin	Certifications (sales thresholds)	Album
2010	"Guapa"	1	1	5	46	42	14	ARG: Gold	Distinto
2010	"Mi Corazón Se Fue"	—	26	—	—	—	—	—	Distinto
2011	"Creo en America" (feat. Ivete Sangalo & ChocQuibTown)	—	—	—	—	—	—	—	Distinto
2011	"Nuevo Día"	—	—	—	—	—	—	—	Distinto
2011	"No Alcanzan las Flores"	—	—	—	—	—	—	—	Distinto
2015	"Hoy Es Domingo" (feat. Rubén Blades)	34	20	27	—	—	—	—	Buena Vida
2015	"La Vida Es Un Vals"	34	20	27	—	—	—	—	Buena Vida
2016	"Iguales" (solo or featuring Lali Espósito & Wisin)	34	20	27	—	—	—	—	Buena Vida
2016	"Silencios de Familia"	—	—	—	—	—	—	—	Non-album single
2018	"Un Poquito" (with Carlos Vives)	—	—	—	—	—	—	AMPROFON: Gold; RIAA: Platinum (Latin)	Atlántico a Pie
2019	"Esa Mujer"	—	—	—	—	—	—	—	Atlántico a Pie
2020	"Empezar De Nuevo" (with Gian Marco)	—	—	—	—	—	—	—	Non-album single
"—" denotes the single failed to chart or not released

== Other appearances ==
- These songs have not appeared on a studio album by Torres.

Year	Song	Album
2007	"Corazón Felino" (Mina feat. Diego Torres)	Todavía
2009	"Te Puedo Acompañar" (Florent Pagny feat. Diego Torres)	C'est comme ça
2009	"La Aventura Del Mar"	El Delfín: La Historia De Un Soñador soundtrack
2010	"Ahora Ya Sé" (Ivete Sangalo feat. Diego Torres)	Multishow ao Vivo: Ivete Sangalo no Madison Square Garden
2016	"Siempre Estaré Ahí" (Rachel Platten feat. Diego Torres)	non-album single
2026	"Yesterday" (with Victor Valdez)	Cradle Rock: Songs for Little Lives

== Music videos ==
Year	Title	Director(s)	Link	Album
1992	"Estamos Juntos"			Diego Torres
1992	"Puedo Decir Que Sí"			Diego Torres
1994	"Tratar de Estar Mejor"	José Luis Lozano		Tratar de Estar Mejor
1994	"Deja de Pedir Perdón"			Tratar de Estar Mejor
1995	"San Salvador"	José Luis Massa		Tratar de Estar Mejor
1996	"Penélope"	Gustavo Garzón		Luna Nueva
1996	"No lo Soñé"	Jorge Caterbona		Luna Nueva
1996	"Sé Que Hay Algo Más"	Jorge Caterbona		Luna Nueva
1997	"Alba"	Jorge Caterbona		Luna Nueva
1997	"Sé Que Ya No Volverás"	Picky Talarico		Luna Nueva
1999	"La Última Noche"	Mariano Mucci		Tal Cual Es
1999	"Recuerda"	Juan C. Lenardi/Jerry Zottola/Diego Torres		Tal Cual Es
2000	"Que Será"	Nahuel Lerena/Eduardo Pinto		Tal Cual Es
2000	"Dónde Van"	Nahuel Lerena/Eduardo Pinto		Tal Cual Es
2001	"Color Esperanza"	Nahuel Lerena/Eduardo Pinto		Un Mundo Diferente
2002	"Que No Me Pierda"	Nahuel Lerena/Eduardo Pinto		Un Mundo Diferente
2002	"Sueños"	Bruno Musso		Un Mundo Diferente
2002	"Perdidos en la Noche"			Un Mundo Diferente
2004	"Cantar Hasta Morir"			MTV Unplugged
2006	"Abriendo Caminos" (featuring Juan Luis Guerra)			Andando
2006	"Andando"	Claudio Divella		Andando
2007	"Hasta Cuándo"	Claudio Divella		Andando
2010	"Guapa"	Jorge Caterbona		Distinto
2010	"Mi Corazón Se Fue"	Martín Coppen/Alejandro Burset		Distinto
2011	"No Alcanzan las Flores"			Distinto
2015	"Hoy Es Domingo"	Gus Carballo		Buena Vida
2015	"La Vida Es Un Vals"	Claudio Divella		Buena Vida
2016	"Iguales"	Germán Alberto García		Buena Vida
Other releases
2009	"La Aventura del Mar"	Jorge Caterbona/Alfonso de Lázzari		El Delfín: La Historia; De Un Soñador soundtrack
