= Cachorro López =

Argentine record producer, musician and songwriter

- Born: Gerardo Horacio López; 3 March 1956 (age 70)
- Origin: Buenos Aires, Argentina
- Genres: Latin music, pop, rock en Español
- Occupations: Songwriter, record producer, bass player
- Instrument: Bass guitar
- Years active: 1979–present
- Website: cachorrolopez.com

Gerardo Horacio López (born 3 March 1956), known professionally as Cachorro López, is an Argentine record producer, musician and songwriter. Born in Buenos Aires, Argentina, he enrolled in various musical ensembles, including Zas and Los Abuelos de la Nada. López has worked with several artists producing their albums, including Caifanes, Stephanie Salas, Andrés Calamaro, Paulina Rubio, Diego Torres and Miranda!. López also was the executive producer of the tribute album for the English band Queen in 1997. His work has been recognized with two Latin Grammy Awards for Producer of the Year in 2006 and 2009, out of four consecutive nominations, and a Grammy Award for producing Limón y Sal by Julieta Venegas.

== Early life and career beginnings ==
Gerardo López attended Belgrano Day School and played rugby on his youth. During one training someone gave him the nickname "Cachorro" because of his height and clumsiness. López lived in London during the 1970s, where he was part of the reggae band Jah Warrior, "Ibiza was the mecca, but not as a center of Raves and disco, but more pleasant," López said. In 1979, López returned to Argentina to renew his passport and after notice an interesting rock movement, he joined the new lineup of the rock band Los Abuelos de la Nada playing bass guitar. "There I met Miguel Abuelo, then there was a hitch and he took me to dinner at his girlfriend home and we were playing all night long. After that I went away with a reggae band on Bristol." He also played with the Bristol band Lola, featuring noted guitarist Steve Warrilow and legendary session drummer, Bill "Bilbo" Birks López began his career as a record producer, when Los Abuelos de la Nada traveled to Ibiza to record Himno de Mi Corazón with English producer Robin Black, and the band manager, Daniel Grinbank, asked the band to behave and that one member should work as a liaison between them and the producer, the band decided that López should do it, since he and Andrés Calamaro were already working as producers for Los Abuelos de la Nada on the past albums. At the same time he was devoted to the artistic production of musicians such as Divina Gloria and David Lebon. López produced Gloria since he thought she was "a very interesting character" and he wanted to work with a woman. In 1982, López was invited by Charly García for the live performance Yendo de la Cama al Living and in 1986 joined Miguel Mateos on the band Zas.

== Production work ==
I love winning the award (Producer of the Year) because I am glad that people pays attention to my work. But the awards are relative, there is no better producer of the year, because it is not like the hundred meter sprint that turns the clock and wins who finishes first.

— Cachorro López, La Argentinidad al Palo

While in Mexico working with Mateos, López produced the first album for Mexican rock band Caifanes and also worked on their second album, El diablito, along Gustavo Santaolalla. López produced in 1993 Ave María for Mexican singer Stephanie Salas. The album earned a Gold certification in Mexico. In 1997, Lopez was the executive producer for the album Tributo a Queen, a tribute disc to British band Queen, that featured Spanish-language versions of songs such as "We Are the Champions", "Save Me", "Some Day One Day" and "These Are the Days of Our Lives", performed by Soda Stereo, Fito Páez and Illya Kuryaki and the Valderramas. The project became highly successful in Latin America. About the album, López said: "The 'Tribute' was very interesting because it put me in contact with a vast diversity of musicians from different countries and styles." The album included his favorite work as a producer: Molotov's "Bohemian Rhapsody/Rap, Soda y Bohemia". In 1998, along with artists such as Molotov, Cafe Tacuba, Julieta Venegas, Moenia, Beto Cuevas, and Aleks Syntek, he worked in another tribute, this time to José José in the successful album Un Tributo.

In Argentina, López worked with Argentinean singer songwriter Diego Torres. Their first collaboration, Tratar de Estar Mejor (1994), sold 700,000 units worldwide. López also produced Tal Cual Es (1999) and Un Mundo Diferente (2001) for Torres, the latter included the song "Color Esperanza", written by Torres, Coti Sorokin and López, which became an anthem of hope in Argentina, since it was released in the midst of the political and economical crisis in the country. The track was performed by children at most elementary schools back to back with the national anthem. Un Mundo Diferente became the best-selling album of 2002 in Argentina, selling 160,000 units and earned a Grammy Award nomination.

López produced Sí for Mexican singer-songwriter Julieta Venegas. The album became very successful and Venegas managed to combine commercial success with the critical acclaim that had always adorned her solo career. The album received the Latin Grammy Award for Best Rock Solo Vocal Album in 2004. In 2006, López and Venegas worked together again for Limón y Sal, an album of "well-crafted pop songs that demand adoration." The album was awarded the Grammy Award for Best Latin Pop Album and the Latin Grammy Award for Best Alternative Music Album. López earned the Latin Grammy Award for Producer of the Year for his work on the albums Limón y Sal, Días Felices by Cristian Castro, the self-titled debut of Vanessa Colaiutta, and Belanova's, Dulce Beat. According to the Allmusic review of the album Dulce Beat, López brought a "key sense of vibrancy to these songs". López and Belanova worked together again in 2008 for Fantasía Pop. The album received the Latin Grammy Award for Best Pop Vocal Album, Duo or Group and peaked at number-one in Mexico. In 2008, López produced La Lengua Popular for his longtime friend Andrés Calamaro and received four Latin Grammy Award nominations, winning for Best Rock Solo Vocal Album.

López received his second award as Producer of the Year at the 10th Latin Grammy Awards for his work with Alex Ubago, Los Pericos, Los Amigos Invisibles, Miranda!, Reik, Manuel Carrasco and Paulina Rubio. López produced Ananda (2006) and Gran City Pop (2009) for Paulina Rubio, and received Latin Grammy nominations for songs included on both albums. He has recently worked with singer Debi Nova on her second studio album Soy and produced Hasta la Raíz by Natalia Lafourcade in 2015, which earned him Latin Grammy Award nominations for Album of the Year and Record of the Year.

== Musical style ==
López defines his musical style as eclectic. "Los Abuelos were an eclectic group... I feel totally responsible for the musical direction of an album, but sometimes I have to write songs, play bass, arrange songs, so I don't have problems working with very different artists." He has two different approaches when writing his music, "many times I collaborate with the artists who I am producing. When we are choosing songs to include on the discs, I sometimes sit with them, as happened with Julieta, Andres Calamaro and Belanova." Also recognizes that when writing a song, "I don't write lyrics, I just write the music, I start with a riff or a simple melodic structure and build from that," changing his system according to the musical style he is working on. About the "Cachorro López sound", he stated that he works on every album as something individual, trying not to repeat the formula on different artist, in order to avoid being boring and repetitive.
