= Atrevido =

Atrevido (Spanish and Portuguese for "daring", "bold") may refer to:

- Atrevido (album), Trueno, 2020
  - "Atrevido", the album's title track
- Atrevido (Ranking Stone album), 1994
- "Atrevido", a song by Orishas from A Lo Cubano
