= Yotuel Romero =

Cuban singer and actor (born 1976)

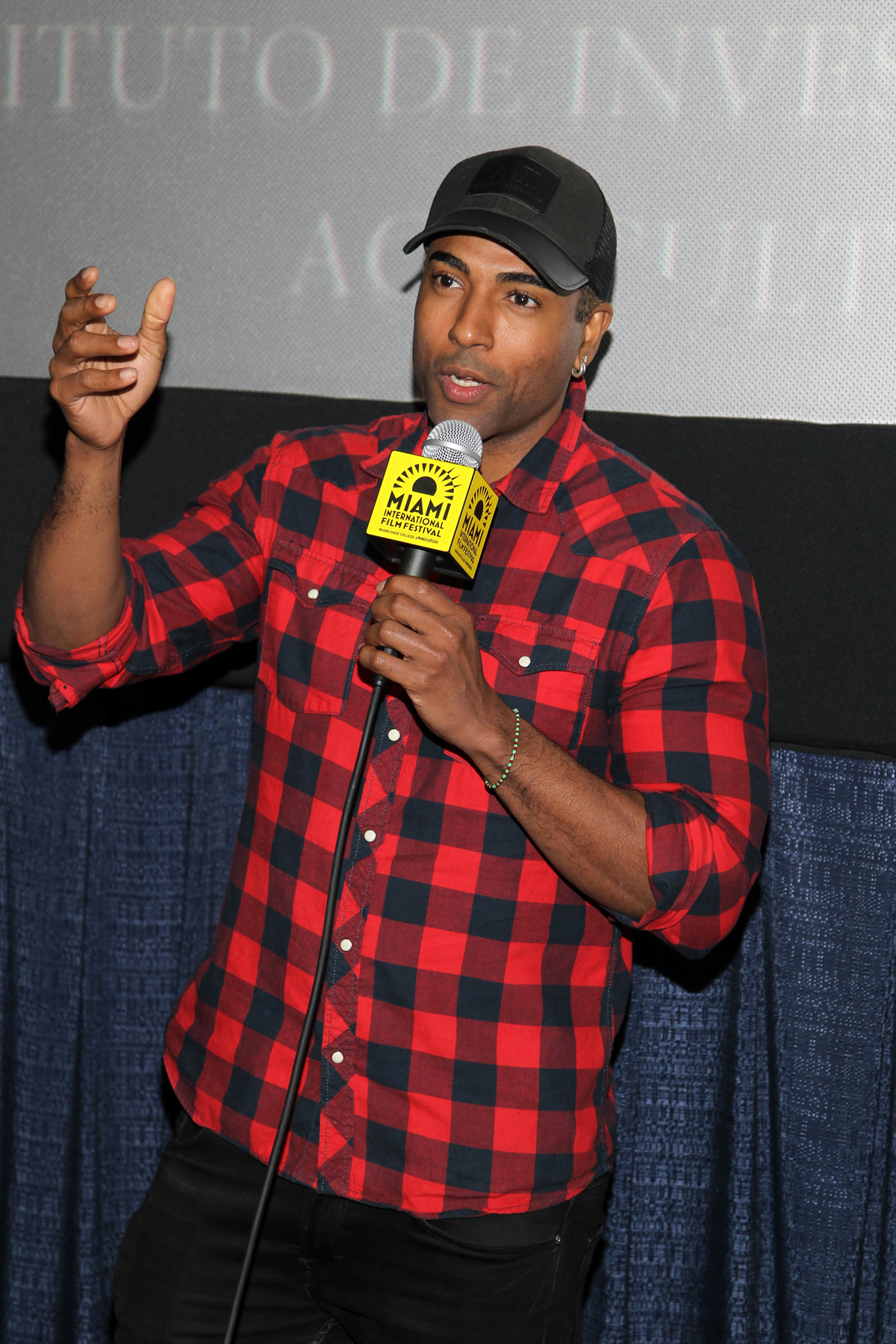

Background information
- Born: Yotuel Omar Romero Manzanares; October 6, 1976 (age 49)
- Origin: Havana, Cuba
- Genres: Latin rap
- Occupations: Singer; actor; model
- Years active: 1996–present
- Label: Sony

Yotuel Omar Romero Manzanares (born October 6, 1976), mononymously known as Yotuel, is a Cuban singer and actor. He was a founding member, lead singer and co-writer of the rap group Orishas, whose album Emigrante won the 2003 Latin Grammy Award for Best Rap/Hip-Hop Album and was nominated for the 2003 Grammy Award for Best Latin Rock/Alternative Album. He announced his departure from the group in 2021 to pursue a solo career.

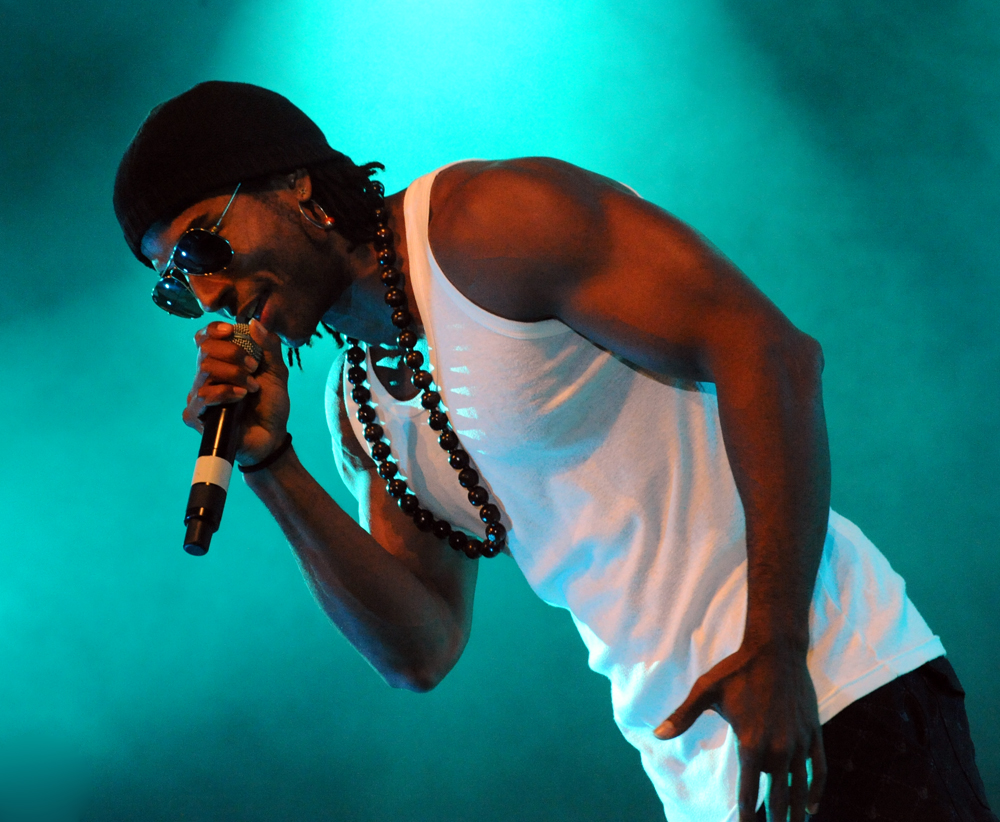
Romero in Warsaw in September 2009

== Early life ==
Yotuel was born in Havana into an Afro-Cuban family. His name is a combination of three Spanish pronouns, yo, tú and él (I, you and he); his parents could not agree on a name, so they combined all three.

== Career ==
=== Amenaza and the move to France ===
Yotuel began performing rap music early in life. At the age of 18 he formed a rap group called Amenaza (Menace) with his friend Hiram Riveri (known as Ruzzo) and Joel Pando. Finding it difficult to make a living as a rap artist in Cuba, he also worked in theatre, television and modelling.

In 1996 Liván Nuñez, a Cuban singer living in France, visited Cuba and expressed interest in recording with Amenaza. In 1997 the group won first prize at the third edition of the underground Cuban rap awards, and later that year recorded a demo produced by X Alfonso. The group received radio play and national television appearances in Cuba. Through this exposure they met Petra Morales, a representative of the French non-profit organisation ADHESIF, who arranged for them to travel to France on a cultural exchange programme.

Few shows were arranged for the group in France, and the band spent about a month homeless in Paris, eating at friends' homes and sleeping in the Paris Métro.

=== Orishas ===
In Paris the group connected with the city's rap scene. Through Nuñez and the producer Niko Noki they were introduced to another singer, Roldán, at a club called Cupol, and the group Orishas was formed. They began writing material for the demo that became their first album, A Lo Cubano.

Yotuel's work with Orishas continued with Emigrante (2002), El Kilo (2005), Antidiótico (2007), Cosita Buena (2008) and Gourmet (2018). He also worked as a composer and record producer, producing the songs "El rey de la pachanga" and "Distinto" from Emigrante and El Kilo respectively.

In 2019, Yotuel released the song "Insomnio" after seeing images of hardship in Cuba.

In January 2021 Yotuel announced that Orishas had split up, telling the agency EFE that relations between the members had cooled and that each of them wanted to pursue a solo career. He said he was working on a solo album, Renacer. In May 2021 the group announced on social media that it would reunite to record a sixth and final album, Adiós, in 2025, followed by a farewell tour, after which Yotuel, Ruzzo and Roldán would continue as solo artists.

=== Acting and other work ===
Yotuel has appeared in the television series La Casa de los Líos, the Peruvian series Cuando Yo Sea Grande and the Spanish series Un Paso Adelante. His film work includes Color Habana, Perfecto Amor Equivocado and Chico Nuevo en la Ciudad. He has appeared in advertising campaigns for Ducados and Havana Club.

=== Patria y Vida and later work ===
In February 2021 the song "Patria y Vida" was released by Yotuel, Descemer Bueno, Gente de Zona, Luis Manuel Otero Alcántara, Maykel Osorbo and DJ El Funky. It was composed by all of them and Beatriz Luengo. The song became a hit and the slogan "Patria y Vida" ("Homeland and Life") was associated with the July 2021 Cuban protests. It is an inversion of the Cuban Revolution motto Patria o Muerte ("Homeland or Death"). The song and the artists, including Yotuel, were criticized in the Cuban mass media. It won the Latin Grammy Awards for Song of the Year and Best Urban Song.

In June 2021 the song "Juntos somos más" by Yotuel, Lara Álvarez and Beatriz Luengo was released as the anthem for the Spanish football team during the 2020 UEFA European Football Championship, which had been postponed to summer 2021 because of the COVID-19 pandemic in Europe.

In September 2022, Yotuel teamed up with the department store Macy's to release a limited-edition capsule celebrating Hispanic Heritage Month.

In 2025, Ruzzo stated publicly that he had not been part of Orishas since 2021 and had no plans to rejoin, after Yotuel and Roldán announced a reconciliation and the group's return to the stage.

== Personal life ==
Yotuel has a son, Yotuelito, born in 2000, from a previous relationship.

He began a relationship with the Spanish actress and singer Beatriz Luengo in 2003, after the two met on the set of Un Paso Adelante, and they married in 2008. The couple have two children.

== Filmography ==
- Perfecto Amor Equivocado (2004), also released as Love by Mistake, as Leoncio

== Television ==
- Un Paso Adelante (2003–2004) as Pavel

== Discography ==
=== Albums ===
- Suerte (2013)

=== Singles ===
- "Me Gusta" (2013)
- "Suerte" (2013)
