= Trueno (rapper) =

Argentine rapper (born 2002)

- Trueno at the 2026 Latin Grammy Awards

Background information
- Also known as: TR1
- Born: Mateo Palacios Corazzina; 25 March 2002 (age 24); La Boca, Buenos Aires, Argentina
- Genres: Latin hip-hop; Latin trap; freestyle rap; Latin R&B; reggaeton
- Occupations: Rapper; singer; songwriter
- Years active: 2017–present
- Label: Sony Latin

Mateo Palacios Corazzina (born 25 March 2002), better known by the stage name Trueno, is an Argentine rapper, singer and songwriter. An established figure in the urban music scene of Argentina, his music combines Latin hip-hop and trap with elements of reggaeton, R&B, pop, rock, and the stylings of classic hip-hop.

Trueno began freestyle rapping at twelve and gained prominence in the Latin American freestyle scene after performances in the ACDP Zoo Juniors tournament and El Quinto Escalón, and winning the Red Bull Batalla de los Gallos and Argentina Freestyle Master Series. He garnered international recognition for his appearance in the freestyle session "BZRP Freestyle Sessions # 6" in collaboration with Bizarrap, which managed to exceed 250,000,000 views on YouTube and currently holds the record for being the most viewed freestyle video on that site.

After qualifying for the grand finals of FMS International in 2020, he retired from freestyling to prioritize his music career, releasing his first studio album, Atrevido, soon after. He has since released an additional three studio albums. With 2026's Turrazo (stylized as TURR4ZO) gaining Trueno his most traction on a global level, he considers representing Argentina and its music on an international level to be part of his responsibility and pride as an artist.

== Early years ==
Mateo was born on 25 March 2002 in the neighborhood of La Boca in Buenos Aires, Argentina. He has described growing up poor, his childhood home constructed from sheet metal and salvaged wood from river boats. As a child, he wanted to be a soccer player, but was influenced by his father into becoming a musician himself. His father is Uruguayan-born rapper Pedro Palacios, known as MC Peligro, who himself is recognized for having won multiple freestyle competitions and founding the hip hop group Comuna 4. His mother, Juliana Corazzina, is a singer and instrumentalist, whom Mateo credits with introducing him to rock and roll and other alternative genres, which shaped his musical style. His paternal grandfather was Yamandú Palacios, an Uruguayan singer-songwriter and guitarist of folklore music, who played alongside artists such as Alfredo Zitarrosa, Joaquín Sabina and Joan Manuel Serrat. From a very young age, he had a great love for rap and hip hop, with some of his influences including American rappers Tupac Shakur, Dr. Dre, and Snoop Dogg. He has also cited Xzibit, 50 Cent, Vico C, and Control Machete as inspirations.

== Career ==
=== 2015-2018: Freestyle competition and first singles ===
Trueno participated in his first nationwide freestyle tournament, A Cara de Perro Zoo Juniors, at thirteen, in Tecnopolis in 2015. Though optimistic about his chances of winning, he performed poorly in the first qualifier and was eliminated. On the loss, his father noted that “he did not say a word in the whole journey back.” That same year, he attempted to participate in the Regional Red Bull in Buenos Aires, but was also eliminated in his first matchup.

In 2016, he participated in A Cara de Perro Zoo Juniors once again, where he was the winner. Reflecting on the experience, he said: “I always care what they say about me. They said I was overrated because I was little or because my old man was a rapper and I thought, what did I do wrong? It cost me, but now I understand that I can’t dwell on that.” After his victory, he was invited to participate in a freestyle competition organized by Vans, celebrating the brand’s fiftieth anniversary. He managed to reach the semifinals, where he was defeated by the rapper Zonda. His participation in this competition was praised by The Free Style, who posited that Trueno “grazed perfection”, adding that in the classic part of the contest, “one could see Trueno a little better than [Zonda].”

He would then compete in the fifth date of the 2016 season in the El Quinto Escalón competition, being eliminated in the round of 16 by Klan in the mode 1vs1vs1. He returned to participate in the sixth date of the competition, where he was again eliminated in the round of 16 in the 1vs1vs1 mode, where the rapper Dani was the winner. In mid-August, he took part in the first Las Vegas Cup date, where he managed to advance to the semifinals before being eliminated. Following his performance that month, Mexican rapper Aczino noticed him and invited him to participate in the Supremacía MC tournament, which would be his first international competition. Again, Palacios managed to advance to the semifinals, where he was defeated by the Peruvian rapper Stick. Later, he participated in the seventh date of El Quinto Escalón where, for the first time in this competition, he managed to reach the quarterfinals, where he was eliminated by the rapper Ecko.

Following being crowned champion in the ACDP Zoo Juniors competition, Trueno would go on to compete in the main category of A Cara de Perro Zoo. A strong performance throughout the tournament carried him to the finals, where he lost to the rapper Cacha. In late October, he participated in the last date of El Quinto Escalón, where he was eliminated in the round of 16 by the rapper Legar. Later, he entered the Ego Fest 2016 tournament, his last competition of that year, and was eliminated by Ecko in the round of 16. In May 2017, he returned to El Quinto Escalón, and participated in the second date of the season, where he was eliminated in the round of 16 against Almagro's Duki.

On June 15, 2017, he released his debut single, "K.I.N.G", alongside a video by Mauro Pérez Quinteros, under the record label NEUEN. On his musical and writing style, he said: “My thing is the attitude and forcefulness of rhymes. My songs come out of nights when I turn on my lamp and write them in 15 minutes.”

In the following month, he participated in the 2017 Cross of Champions, held at the Teatro Gran Rex. There, Trueno was crowned the winner of the tournament after beating the rapper Cacha. The digital media outlet El Estilo Libre commented "Trueno stood out once again above the stage", adding that the event "marked history in the scene of Argentine freestyle". After this, he released his second single, "En La Ola", accompanied by a video directed by León Pintos Alarcón. The song became popular online, which led to the music video exceeding one million views in just under two weeks. This success led to the organizers of the Club Media Fest Argentina inviting him to perform an exhibition battle. The exhibition, held in October, was attended by Dtoke, Underdann, and his father MC Peligro.

In November, he appeared on the song "Salamandra" by Underdann, published on November 18. Trueno went on to publish two songs in the first half of 2018: "4AM" on January 25, and "Rain" on May 30. The former was released along with a music video, with León Pintos Alarcón directing again. The latter, "Rain", produced by XOVOX, gained traction online and surpassed 15 million views on YouTube by 2019, and would go on to be the first song in his Rain series. Later, he participated in the 2018 edition of the FMS Argentina championship, but performed weakly in his matches and finished in the last place, with 8 points and losing 7 of the 9 matches. “I was watching the battle with others and laughing a lot, that’s what’s best, more than winning or losing.” Rappers Wos and Dani soon retired from the tournament, however, saving Trueno from being demoted as the lowest ranking rapper. Instead, he competed in a play-off between the last and first of the first and second divisions, respectively.

Nearing the end of December, he released the single "Boom", again produced by XOVOX, which garnered attention on social media and achieved 14 million YouTube listens in just under a year.

=== 2019: Sessions with Bizarrap and wider reach ===
On March 23, Trueno was invited to participate in the Pangea tournament, an international freestyle competition held at the Pepsi Center WTC in Mexico City. Originally paired with the rapper Dtoke, Palacios competed alongside Replik, who replaced him. There, the pair was eliminated in the round of 16 by the Ibero-Chilean duo Zasko and Ricto. Four days later, in the municipal theater of Lomas de Zamora, he competed against the rapper Tuqu in the playoffs, which decided who would compete in the FMS Argentina tournament. Trueno was declared the winner with 350 points, 24 more than his rival, securing a spot in that year's competition. The following month, he was invited to perform an exhibition battle at the Lollapalooza Argentina along with rappers Dtoke, Papo, Dozer, MKS, and Dani. A few months later, Trueno was chosen alongside rappers Wos and Papo to represent the Argentine team in the 2019 edition of the international God Level competition. There, the trio of Argentines managed to finish in second place, losing in the final round against team Chile.

Trueno’s relevance led to music producer Bizarrap inviting him to record the freestyle session "BZRP freestyle Sessions #6", which became a huge success on YouTube, exceeding 120 million views a year after its release, giving it the record of the most viewed freestyle video on the website. Later, in August, he released the song "Fresko" in collaboration with Bhavi and Halpe. Its music video, directed by Facu Ballve, was sponsored by the Axe brand and supported by Orishinal, an executive producer. Silvana Frenquel, head of operations of Orishinal, commented that, to carry out this campaign, they had to “map the artists, taking into account their reach on social networks and interaction.” The video became popular online and managed over 18 million views in less than six months. At the end of that month, he was invited to an exhibition battle against local rapper Bion in the 2019 BDM Cádiz tournament, held in Arcos de la Frontera, Spain.

Later, in a qualifying-round battle for FMS International held in Valencia, he faced the Spanish rapper Kaze, in an event also featuring DJ R de Rumba. In early October, he did another freestyle session with Bizarrap. The session, "BZRP Music Sessions #16", was posted on October 3 on YouTube and garnered 78 million views in under a year. It also did well on the charts in Argentina, entering the Billboard Argentina Hot 100 chart and debuting in the 13th position.

Trueno participated in the freestyle competition organized by Red Bull: the Argentine edition of Battle of Gallos, held at Luna Park in Buenos Aires on October 21. After winning the final round against rapper Wolf, Palacios became champion of the competition. Belén Filgueira, from Infobae, admired Trueno’s performance: "He’s from La Boca, he's 17 years old, and with his flow, he was crowned champion of the biggest freestyle competition in the Spanish-speaking world. Now, he will travel to Spain to compete for the international championship, the title that every MC wishes to achieve.” A few months later, he performed alongside Venezuelan rapper Letra in the 2vs2 All Stars edition of the God Level tournament. There, the pair reached the final, where they were defeated by the rappers Jaze and Stuart.

For his performance in its national counterpart, Trueno was chosen as one of the Argentine representatives for the International edition of Red Bull Battle of Gallos. Trueno advanced to the quarterfinals, where he was eliminated by Mexican rapper Aczino.

At the end of the year, he competed in the last round of the Argentine FMS and, with 5 wins and 4 losses, was crowned as champion over Papu, who, while having a higher number of victories, ended up being runner-up by point difference. The writer Dante Conti, from Silencio magazine, described Palacios as going “from not being called to the league to being the favorite” and from “being the first eliminated to being first place.” He opined that Trueno was the “MC with the greatest projection of the history of Argentine freestyle”.

=== 2020-2021: Atrevido ===
On February 20, 2020, he released the single "Atrevido", the titular first promotional single from his debut album, and a music video directed by Facu Ballve. After releasing the song, Trueno commented: "In my neighborhood, La Boca, there are people who dare to do good and others who dare to do evil. The message is to dare to do good, to break the ice and fight for your dreams."

As the reigning champion of the Argentine edition, he participated in a battle of the 2020 edition of the FMS International in early March, where he beat the Chilean rapper El Menor at the Teatro Caupolicán in Chile and earned a place in the grand final of the tournament, to be held in the Plaza detoros de Acho, in Peru. However, Palacios said in an interview that he “no longer wanted to be in FMS”, and decided to leave the competition prioritize his artistic career, so El Menor replaced him in the final.

Trueno announced, alongside his departure from the FMS finals, that he was working on his debut album, Atrevido, to be released at the end of March. However, he ended up delaying the release date to July 25 due to the COVID-19 pandemic: "I decided to postpone the release date of the album Atrevido because I don’t want to pretend nothing’s happening when everything is so heavy.” In late March, he released the second promotional single from his album, “Azul y Oro”, a song about his passion for the football team Club Atlético Boca Juniors, produced by Taiu and Tatool. The videos for both “Azul y Oro” and the preceding "Atrevido" reached one million views the day they were released.

Atrevido released two days earlier than the planned release date of July 25. Released under the NEUEN label, the project featured ten songs and collaborations from Wos, Alemán, Nicki Nicole and Bizarrap. Following its release, Palacios said in an interview: “What I’m looking for is a real person-to-person connection, and the features I have all represent a big part of me, each one in a different way.” The song "Mamichula", with Nicki Nicole and Bizarrap, managed to debut in the first place of the Argentina Hot 100 list of Billboard. This was the fourth Argentine song to ever top said list, previously only achieved by Paulo Londra and Damas Gratis. It achieved almost 100 million views on YouTube in its first month. In August, he appeared on one of the "seventh anniversary" covers of Argentina's Billboard magazine, as the artist of the month.

At the end of October and in collaboration with Bizarrap and Acru, he released the song "Jugador del año", which was the official track of the Primera División de Argentina. Acru commented on the song in an interview with Rolling Stone: "We seek to convey the fusion between the world of rap and football. [...] I think athletes and rappers often come from very similar places. They have to have hours of dedication, training, work and discipline to grow and reach new places."

December saw the release of the music videos for Atrevido’s "Background" and "Ñeri". Both were directed by El Dorado and Lucas Vignale, with “Ñeri” recorded at the Alberto J Stadium.

In June 2021, Trueno released his first live album, Atrevido En Vivo, recorded from his first and at the time current tour. On July 15, 2021, mid Atrevido Tour, Trueno released "Solo Por Vos", the first promotional single from his upcoming studio album, Bien o Mal. "Feel Me??" and “Dance Crip” would release as successive singles in September and November, respectively, and were positioned on the Argentina Hot 100 at number 25 and 2.

=== 2022-2024: Bien o Mal ===
Trueno began 2022 by releasing "Jungle" with Randy and Bizarrap, first presented at his Lollapalooza Chile performance, as one more promotional single for Bien o Mal.

Bien o Mal officially saw release on May 12, 2022. It is focused on the experiences and expressions of Argentine culture, described by Palacios as being "about the music of my country." The album features collaborations with Bizarrap, JID, J Balvin, Nathy Peluso, and others. It is divided into three parts, with one consisting of six songs, another just one, and the other three. "Tierra Zanta" serves as a thematic core of the album, a collaboration with Víctor Heredia that celebrates the lives of all Latin American peoples and links them as brothers and roots in South American history. Similarly thematically central to the album is his collaboration with Nathy Peluso on “Argentina”, which features the name of every Argentine province in its lyrics, as well as a sample of “The Axes of My Wagon” by Atahualpa Yupanqu. In September, Trueno performed a concert from his childhood neighborhood in La Boca for NPR's Tiny Desk, during its Latinx Heritage Month celebration, "El Tiny." His set included "Dance Crip", "Argentina", "Tierra Zante", and the titular track of "Bien o Mal".

On May 16, 2023, he won the Gardel de Oro for his career performance, as well as the award for Best Urban Music, and Recording of the Year with Nathy Peluso for "Argentina". The following month, he featured on Nicky Jam's single "Cangrinaje". On September 12, he began the Bien o Mal tour in Madrid, traveling to countries such as the United States, France, and Mexico. On March 1, 2024, he made his first concert at the International Festival of the Song of Viña del Mar, the first rapper to perform at the Chilean event, and one of the youngest artists ever to perform at the festival. The 50+ minute show earned him two silver and gold Gaviotas.

=== 2024-2025: El Último Baile ===
His third album El Último Baile released in 2024, his first under Sony Music Latin. A dedication to hip hop, having released less than a year after its fiftieth anniversary, it samples and references hip hop pioneers such as Grandmaster Flash and Lauryn Hill, and incorporates samples of classic hip hop music, including Hot in Herre, Hail Mary, and The Message. It is also, indirectly, related to experiences in Palacios's personal life throughout 2023, such as his breakup and changing his equipment. It consists of thirteen tracks, with “Tranky Funky”, “Ohh Baby”, and “The Roof Is On Fire” being released prior to the album as singles. El Último Baile was nominated for Best Urban Music Album at the 2024 Latin Grammy Awards, with "Tranky Funky" winning for Best Urban Fusion/Performance. "Tranky Funky" also received three Premios Gardel nominations, including Song of the Year.

Trueno was a featured artist on three singles before the end of 2024: "Cuando Te Vi" with Big One and Maria Becerra; "Sunday" by Bhavi; and "Tristeza de la Ciudad" with Cachorra Lopez and Julieta Venegas. His 2025 began with four more collaborative singles: "Angelito" by Bad Gyal; "Fale Então" by Marshmello; "Cruz" featuring Feid; and "En La City" with Young Miko. The latter two were released as promotional singles for El Último Baile Deluxe, along with "Fresh", with the deluxe album dropping May 21, 2025. At the 2025 Latin Grammy Awards, Trueno was nominated twice in the Best Hip Hop Song category, for "Fresh" and the song "Parriba", done in collaboration with Akapellah, winning the former. "En La City" also received a nomination, for Best Urban Song.

In 2025, Palacios revealed he had been in difficult financial straits in 2024, after investing almost all of his money in purchasing the rights to Atrevido and Bien o Mal. The contract made by his former team gave them ownership of the masters, forcing him to spend $2 million in order to recover them. Despite this, in September, he gave the program La Revuelta permission to use the song "No Cap" in their broadcasts for free. After regaining his songs, he stated that El Último Baile's release allowed him to recoup the financial loss.

Trueno featured on the album of fellow Argentine artist and friend Milo J, La Vida Era Más Corta, which released September 25, though their song, "Gil", was released the day before as a single. They performed "Gil" on the On The Radar radio show in December of the same year. Gil would go on to win Best Urban Performance at the 2026 Latin Grammy Awards.

He also collaborated with the British animated band Gorillaz, in the song "The Manifesto", featured alongside Proof. It released in October as a single, prior to its album, The Mountain, which would come out in February of 2026. Previously, he had met Damon Albarn in 2022 after Albarn invited him to do freestyle at an event in Glastonbury.

In collaboration with Red Bull Surco, November saw the release of Trueno's second live album, a symphony directed by Pedro Pasquale, Francisco Jose Cia, and Axel Introini. The concert, which was filmed and released on YouTube, and its corresponding album, feature orchestral versions of eighteen tracks from El Último Baile, Atrevido, and Bien o Mal, arranged by Sebastian Fucci. Guest appearances include Feid, MC Peligro, Milo J, Rodolfo Mederos, and Cypress Hill, the last of whom he had previously collaborated with in a 2023 remix of "Fuck El Police".

=== 2026: Turrazo ===
Trueno served as the opening act for the European leg of Gorillaz's 2026 tour, performing in Dublin, Nottingham, Belfast, and others throughout March 2026.

Palacios took a long absence from social media in the months preceding the release of his album. Throughout late April, he released several singles as promotion for the upcoming Turrazo, beginning with "X Una Llanta" on April 14, along with a music video directed by Agustín Puente and Clemente Bruzzone, then "Uruguay" with Ruben Rada, "Pity in the Sky" with Pity, "Grillz" with Neo Pistea, "90s" with Maria Becerra (also with a Puente-directed video), and "1000 Horas" with Andrés Calamaro the following week. His fourth studio album, Turrazo, released the day after. Considering it to be his most biographical album, Trueno opined he feels it best expresses "who [he is] as an artist." He aimed to capture specific elements from his three preceding albums: the global and "radio-friendly" feeling of En Último Baile, the folkloric and native Argentine influences of Bien o Mal, and the "neighborhood vibe" of Atrevido. The tracks "Pumas" and "Turrazo" released with music videos directed by Puente, with the former co-directed by Bruzzone, and both produced by The Movement (as with "90s" and "X Una Llanta") in April. A music video for "Zombi" directed by Juan Cruz Ferniot and Octavia Huarriz and featuring animation by WildThings Studio released in October.

Trueno performed the title track of the album during his appearance on The Tonight Show Starring Jimmy Fallon in April. The success of Turrazo led to Trueno being featured alongside Bella Kay and Slayyyter as the cover story on Billboard's Up-And-Comers issue, published August 1. Later, in August, he was a featured performer at the 2026 Latin Alternative Music Conference, closing the show at SummerStage alongside Milo J. His Turrazo World Tour properly runs from October through November.

== Public image ==
Palacios has frequently represented his Argentinian upbringing, with Atrevido being about his neighborhood of La Boca, Bien o Mal about Argentina as a whole, and the Turrazo track "Pumas" incorporating Quechua-derived phrases and further portraying his Argentine pride. More recently, has made a point of not losing his Rioplatense accent in his music.

He is open about his background growing up working class, identifying with the term turrazo (the title of his fourth album), a "grown up" version of the Argentine slang term turro, which refers to kids from humble neighborhoods. He performed on the Tonight Show With Jimmy Fallon wearing a shirt reading (in Spanish): "In the rich folks' industry, there are no weapons or grudges. It's only about money, not love."

Palacios is a vocal critic of the police, both in Argentina and around the world. In "Fuck El Police", he rebukes police for their brutality, classism, and racism, making reference to the murder of George Floyd, and invoking Jorge Rafael Videla and Emilio Eduardo Masser. He has further decried Argentine military civic dictatorships and the repression of its history in live performances: in a 2022 Luna Park performance, he wore a shirt reading "Nunca Más" (Never Again), while at the Chilean festival of Viña del Mar, at the end of his set, he left a message against the dictatorships that occurred in Chile and Argentina: "I shit on Videla, I shit on Pinochet and all the dictators. Never again, nor forget or forgive."

== Discography ==
=== Albums ===
==== Studio albums ====
List of studio albums, with details of album and selected chart positions
| Title | Album details | Peak chart positions | | Certifications |
| Title | Album details | ARG | SPA | Certifications |
|---|---|---|---|---|
| Atrevido | Released: 23 July 2020; Label: Sur Capital Records; Formats: Digital download, streaming | — | 4 | CAPIF: 4× Platinum |
| Bien o Mal | Released: 12 May 2022; Label: Sur Capital Records; Formats: Digital download, streaming | — | 23 | |
| El Último Baile | Released: 23 May 2024; Label: Sony Music Latin; Formats: LP, digital download, streaming | 1 | 6 | |
| Turrazo | Released: 24 April 2026; Label: Sony Music Latin; Formats: Digital download, streaming | — | 10 | |
"—" denotes a recording that did not chart or was not released in that territory.

==== Live albums ====
List of live albums with details
| Title | Album details |
|---|---|
| Atrevido en Vivo | Released: 27 June 2021; Label: NEUEN, Sony Music Latin; Format: Digital download, streaming |

=== Singles ===
==== As a lead artist ====
List of singles as lead artist, with selected chart positions, showing year released, certifications and album name
| Title | Year | Peak chart positions | | | | | | Certifications | Album |
| Title | Year | ARG | MEX Pop | PAR | SPA | URU | WW | Certifications | Album |
|---|---|---|---|---|---|---|---|---|---|
| "K.I.N.G" | 2017 | — | — | — | — | — | — | | Non-album singles |
| "En La Ola" | 2017 | — | — | — | — | — | — | | Non-album singles |
| "4AM" | 2018 | — | — | — | — | — | — | | Non-album singles |
| "Rain" | 2018 | — | — | — | — | — | — | | Non-album singles |
| "Neón" | 2018 | — | — | — | — | — | — | | Non-album singles |
| "La Salamandra" (with Underdann) | 2018 | — | — | — | — | — | — | | Non-album singles |
| "Boom" | 2018 | — | — | — | — | — | — | | Non-album singles |
| "Broke" (with Tano B) | 2019 | — | — | — | — | — | — | | Non-album singles |
| "Trueno: Bzrp Freestyle Sessions Vol. 6" (with Bizarrap) | 2019 | — | — | — | — | — | — | | Non-album singles |
| "Trueno: Brzp Music Sessions Vol. 16" (with Bizarrap) | 2019 | 13 | — | — | 99 | — | — | | Non-album singles |
| "Trueno: Dolly Freestyle Sessions #01" | 2019 | — | — | — | — | — | — | | Non-album singles |
| "My Dog Is" (with C. Terrible and Shaolin Monkey) | 2019 | — | — | — | — | — | — | | Non-album singles |
| "Atrevido" | 2020 | 31 | — | — | — | — | — | CAPIF: Platinum; AMPROFON: Gold; PROMUSICAE: Gold | Atrevido |
| "Azul y Oro Freestyle" | 2020 | — | — | — | — | — | — | | Atrevido |
| "Mamichula" (with Nicki Nicole and Bizarrap) | 2020 | 1 | — | 79 | 1 | — | 100 | CAPIF: 3× Platinum; AMPROFON: 2× Platinum; CUD: 2× Platinum; PROMUSICAE: 4× Platinum | Atrevido |
| "Jugador del Año" (with Bizarrap and Acru) | 2020 | — | — | — | — | — | — | | Non-album single |
| "Background" | 2020 | — | — | — | — | — | — | | Atrevido |
| "Ñeri" | 2020 | 44 | — | — | — | — | — | CAPIF: Gold; CUD: Gold; PROMUSICAE: Gold | Atrevido |
| "Rain II" | 2021 | 76 | — | — | 95 | — | — | | Atrevido |
| "Panamá" (with Duki) | 2021 | 16 | — | — | 43 | — | — | CAPIF: Gold; CUD: Gold; PROMUSICAE: Gold | Bien o Mal |
| "Solo Por Vos" | 2021 | 29 | — | 93 | — | — | — | CAPIF: Gold; CUD: Gold | Bien o Mal |
| "Feel Me??" | 2021 | 25 | — | — | 43 | 20 | — | CAPIF: Platinum; CUD: Platinum; PROMUSICAE: Platinum | Bien o Mal |
| "Salimo de Noche" (with Tiago PZK) | 2021 | 1 | 24 | 6 | 8 | 1 | 136 | PROMUSICAE: Gold; RIAA: Gold (Latin); RIAA: Gold (Latin) | Bien o Mal |
| "Dance Crip" | 2021 | 2 | — | 32 | 8 | 15 | 169 | CAPIF: Platinum; AMPROFON: Gold; CUD: Platinum; PROMUSICAE: Platinum | Bien o Mal |
| "Tierra Zanta" (with Victor Heredia) | 2022 | 45 | — | — | — | — | — | | Bien o Mal |
| "Un Paso" (with J Balvin) | 2022 | 33 | — | — | 100 | — | — | | Non-album singles |
| "Dubai" (with Beny Jr) | 2023 | — | — | — | 56 | — | — | | Non-album singles |
| "Real Gangsta Love" | 2024 | 3 | — | — | 1 | — | 22 | | El Último Baile |
| "Cuando Te Vi" (Note: Subtitled "Crossover #5".) (Big One with María Becerra) | 2024 | 3 | — | — | 14 | — | — | | Non-album singles |
| "Angelito" (with Bad Gyal) | 2025 | 51 | — | — | 7 | — | — | | Non-album singles |
| "Cruz" (with Feid) | 2025 | 35 | — | — | 42 | — | — | | Non-album singles |
| "Fale Então" (with Marshmello) | 2025 | — | — | — | — | — | — | | Non-album singles |
"—" denotes a recording that did not chart or was not released in that territory.

==== As a featuring artist ====
List of singles as a featuring artist, showing year released and album name
| Title | Year | Album |
|---|---|---|
| "C90 (Remix)" (John C, Neo Pistea and Bhavi featuring Trueno) | 2019 | Non-album singles |
| "Los Aparatos" (El Alfa featuring Noriel and Trueno) | 2022 | Non-album singles |
| "The Manifesto" (Gorillaz featuring Trueno & Proof) | 2025 | The Mountain |

=== Other charted songs ===
List of other charted songs, with selected chart positions, showing year released, certifications and album name
| Title | Year | Peaks | | Certifications | Album |
| Title | Year | ARG | SPA | Certifications | Album |
| "Sangría" (with Wos) | 2020 | 12 | 37 | CAPIF: Platinum; CUD: Gold; PROMUSICAE: Gold | Atrevido |
| "Argentina" (with Nathy Peluso) | 2022 | 48 | — | | Bien o Mal |
| "No Cap" | 2024 | 98 | — | | El Último Baile |
| "The Roof Is on Fire" | 2024 | 94 | — | | El Último Baile |
| "Pull Up!" | 2024 | 97 | — | | El Último Baile |
| "Rain III" | 2024 | 95 | — | | El Último Baile |
"—" denotes a recording that did not chart or was not released in that territory.

== Awards and nominations ==
| Award | Year | Category | Nominated work | Result | Ref. |
|---|---|---|---|---|---|
| Heat Latin Music Awards | 2023 | Best Artist Southern Region | Trueno | Nominated | |
| MTV Europe Music Awards | 2021 | Best Latin America South Act | Trueno | Nominated | |
| MTV Millennial Awards | 2022 | Argentine Artist | Trueno | Nominated | |
| Premios Gardel | 2021 | Best New Artist | Atrevido | Won | |
| Premios Gardel | 2021 | Best Urban/Trap Song or Album | "Mamichula" (with Nicki Nicole & Bizarrap) | Won | |
| Premios Gardel | 2021 | Best Urban/Trap Collaboratio | "Mamichula" (with Nicki Nicole & Bizarrap) | Nominated | |
| Premios Gardel | 2022 | Song of the Year | "Dance Crip" | Nominated | |
| Premios Gardel | 2022 | Record of the Year | "Dance Crip" | Nominated | |
| Premios Gardel | 2022 | Best Music Video | "Dance Crip" | Won | |
| Premios Gardel | 2022 | Best Urban Song | "Dance Crip" | Won | |
| Premios Gardel | 2022 | Best Urban Song | "Salimo de Noche" (with Tiago PZK) | Nominated | |
| Premios Gardel | 2022 | Best Urban Collaboration | "Salimo de Noche" (with Tiago PZK) | Nominated | |
| Premios Gardel | 2022 | Best Live Album | Atrevido en vivo | Won | |
| Premios Gardel | 2023 | Album of the Year | Bien o mal | Won | |
| Premios Gardel | 2023 | Best Urban Music Album | Bien o mal | Won | |
| Premios Gardel | 2023 | Song of the Year | "Tierra Zanta" | Nominated | |
| Premios Gardel | 2023 | Song of the Year | "Argentina" (with Nathy Peluso) | Nominated | |
| Premios Gardel | 2023 | Record of the Year | "Argentina" (with Nathy Peluso) | Won | |
| Premios Gardel | 2023 | Best Urban Song | "Argentina" (with Nathy Peluso) | Nominated | |
| Premios Gardel | 2023 | Best Urban Song | "Sudaka" (with Dante Spinetta) | Nominated | |
| Premios Gardel | 2023 | Best Urban Collaboration | "Sudaka" (with Dante Spinetta) | Won | |
| Premios Gardel | 2024 | Song of the Year | "Tranky Funky" | Nominated | |
| Premios Gardel | 2024 | Record of the Year | "Tranky Funky" | Nominated | |
| Premios Gardel | 2024 | Best Urban Song | "Tranky Funky" | Nominated | |
| Premios Gardel | 2024 | Best Urban Collaboration | "Fuck el Police (Remix)" (with Cypress Hill) | Nominated | |
| Premios Gardel | 2024 | Best Music Video | "Fuck el Police (Remix)" (with Cypress Hill) | Nominated | |
| Latin Grammy Awards | 2023 | Best Rap/Hip Hop Song | "Dance Crip" | Nominated | |
| Latin Grammy Awards | 2024 | Best Urban Fusion/Performance | "Tranky Funky" | Won | |
| Latin Grammy Awards | 2024 | Best Urban Music Album | El Último Baile | Nominated | |
| Latin Grammy Awards | 2025 | Best Rap/Hip Hop Song | "Fresh" | Won | |
| Latin Grammy Awards | 2025 | Best Rap/Hip Hop Song | "Parriba" (with Akapellah) | Nominated | |
| Latin Grammy Awards | 2025 | Best Urban Song | "En la City" (with Young Miko) | Nominated | |
| Latin Grammy Awards | 2026 | Best Urban Performance | "Gil" (with Milo J) | Won | |
| Premios Juventud | 2022 | Best Song by a Couple | "Mamichula" (with Nicki Nicole & Bizarrap) | Nominated | |
| Premios Juventud | 2023 | The New Generation – Male | Trueno | Nominated | |
| Rolling Stone en Español Awards | 2023 | Promising Artist of the Year | Trueno | Nominated | |
| Rolling Stone en Español Awards | 2023 | Song of the Year | "Dance Crip" | Nominated | |
| Rolling Stone en Español Awards | 2023 | Song of the Year | "Sudaka" (with Dante Spinetta) | Nominated | |
| Rolling Stone en Español Awards | 2023 | Video of the Year | "Sudaka" (with Dante Spinetta) | Nominated | |
| Premios Quiero | 2020 | Best Rap/Trap/Hip Hop Video | "C90 Remix" ( with Jhon C, Bhavi & Neo Pistea) | Nominated | |
| Premios Quiero | 2020 | Best Rap/Trap/Hip Hop Video | "Mamichula" (with Nicki Nicole) | Won | |
| Premios Quiero | 2020 | Video of the Year | "Mamichula" (with Nicki Nicole) | Nominated | |
