= Todos Éxitos =

Greatest hits album by Diego Torres
- Released: September 23, 2008
- Recorded: 1992–2008
- Genre: Latin pop
- Label: Sony Music
- Producer: Diego Torres, Cachorro López, Celso Valli, Kike Santander, Sebastián Schon, Rolfi Calahorrano

Diego Torres chronology
Un Cachito de Mí: Grandes Éxitos (2008)	Todos Éxitos (2008)	Distinto (2010)

Professional ratings
Review scores
Source	Rating
Amazon	3/5 stars

Todos Éxitos is the first greatest hits album from Argentine singer Diego Torres released on November 12, 2008 through Sony Music. The compilation was released in two different formats, including a one disc edition and a CD+DVD edition.

== Track listing ==
No.	Title	Writer(s)	Length
1.	"Perdidos En La Noche"	Kike Santander/Gustavo Santander	3:53
2.	"Donde Van"	Pablo Duchovny/Coti Sorokin/Diego Torres	4:14
3.	"Alba" (with Ketama)	Antonio González Flores	3:48
4.	"Pensar" (Que Siempre Hay Alguien Más)	Cachorro López/Torres	4:37
5.	"Sueños"	López/Sebastián Schon/Torres	3:47
6.	"Tal Cual Es"	R. Calahonarro/T. Fernández/López/Torres	4:53
7.	"Estamos Juntos"	Claudia Brant/López/Dany Tomas/Torres	3:38
8.	"Color Esperanza"	Cachorro López/Coti Sorokin/Diego Torres	4:27
9.	"Andando"	Torres/Afo Verde	4:40
10.	"Todo Cambia" (Y Todo Se Termina)	López/Torres	5:11
11.	"Abriendo Caminos" (with Juan Luis Guerra)	Luis Cardoso/Torres	4:10
12.	"Por Mirarte"	Andrés Calamaro/Augusto "Gringui" Herrera	4:45
13.	"La Zarzamora"	Rafael DeLeón/Antonio Quintero/Manuel Quiroga	4:36
14.	"No Tan Distintos"	Diego Arnedo/Luca Prodan/Alberto "Superman" Troglio	4:14
15.	"Penélope"	Augusto Algueró/Joan Manuel Serrat	5:19

== Chart performance ==
Chart (2008)	Peak position
Argentina Albums Chart	12
Mexican Albums Chart	94
