= Patria y Vida =

Cuban slogan and song

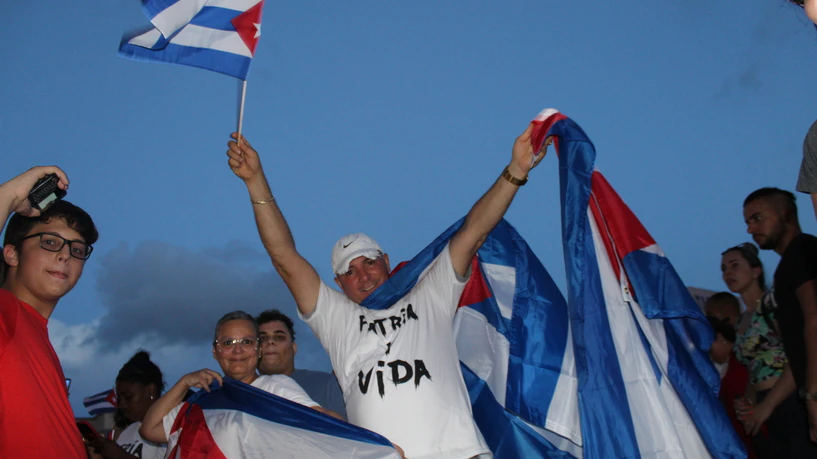
Protester in Miami with a T-shirt reading "Patria y Vida"

"Patria y Vida" ("Homeland and Life") is a slogan and song associated with the July 2021 Cuban protests. It is an inversion of the Cuban Revolution motto Patria o Muerte ("Homeland or Death"). The slogan was popularized by a reggaeton song released in February 2021 by Yotuel, Beatriz Luengo, Descemer Bueno, Gente de Zona, Luis Manuel Otero Alcántara, Maykel Osorbo and El Funky. It became associated with the Cuban opposition since then.

== Release and reception ==
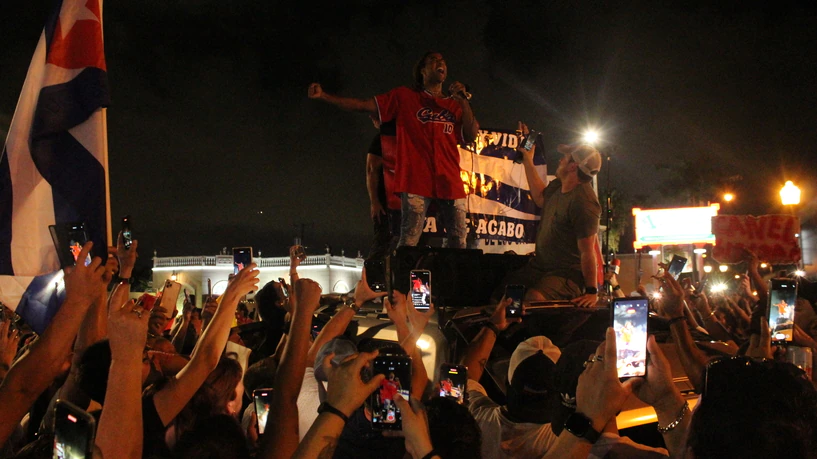
Yotuel, former member of Orishas, performing "Patria y Vida" in support of the protests in Cuba.

The song "Patria y Vida" was released on 16 February 2021, performed by Cuban rappers Yotuel Romero, Descemer Bueno, Maykel Osorbo, El Funky and the group Gente de Zona. The title of the song refers to the phrase "Patria o muerte ¡Venceremos!", coined by Fidel Castro in March 1960, after the triumph of the Cuban Revolution and which has been used as one of the slogans of the Cuban government. The lyrics of the song criticize the Cuban government with phrases such as "My people ask for freedom, no more doctrines". The song also alludes to recent events in Cuba, including the arrest of rapper Denis Solís and the arrest of members of the San Isidro Movement in November 2020 after they staged a hunger strike in protest of Solis' arrest. It also mentions the problems facing the country such as food shortages and the depreciation of the Cuban peso. The video clip of the song, recorded in Havana and Miami, exceeded one million views on YouTube within three days of its release.

After its publication, the song was criticised by the Cuban government. The newspaper Granma, owned by the Cuban Communist Party, published three articles discrediting the song, labeling it as a "rag and cowardly" song, its authors as "rats" seeking to "change Cuba for a million views on YouTube" and calling the song an "operation from Miami". In the 2020 Olympics, the gold medal winner Cuban boxer Julio César La Cruz expressed his support for the Cuban government by declaring after his quarterfinal victory "Patria y vida, no. ¡Patria o muerte, venceremos!".

The Cuban government's criticism caused the slogan "Patria y Vida" to begin to be used by the government's opponents as a symbol. A few days after the song's release, two Cuban activists were arrested in Havana for writing the phrase "Patria y Vida" on the facade of their house. On March 6, a demonstration of Cuban exiles in Miami used the slogan "Patria y vida" to call for an end to the Cuban government. Rapper Maykel Castillo, who collaborated on the song's video clip, was arrested in May on charges of inciting public disorder. The Cuban government banned the reproduction of the song.

"Patria y Vida" won Song of the Year and Best Urban Song at the 22nd Annual Latin Grammy Awards in 2021.

== 2021 protests ==
On 11 July 2021, a series of demonstrations began in Cuba against the government of Miguel Díaz-Canel. The first protests erupted in San Antonio de los Baños, near Havana, and in Palma Soriano, in the province of Santiago de Cuba, with people chanting "Patria y Vida", as well as other slogans and criticizing the government's response to the COVID-19 pandemic on the island and the subsequent economic crisis. The hashtag #PatriaYVida was used on social networks to spread the protests along with others such as #SOSCuba. The phrase has been considered a symbol of the opposition to the Cuban government and the song as an anthem of the protests.

The slogan was also used in protests in support of Cuban demonstrators in various parts of Latin America, including Argentina, Mexico and Peru, as well as the United States.

By the time the demonstrations began, the song already had more than six million views on YouTube. Its author, Yotuel Romero, has proposed that July 11 be considered "Day of Homeland and Life" in honor of the demonstrations that began on that day.
