= Hoy Es Domingo =

Single by Diego Torres featuring Rubén Blades

from the album Buena Vida
- Released: July 10, 2015
- Genre: Latin pop
- Length: 4:37
- Label: Sony Music Latin
- Songwriters: Diego Torres, Beatriz Luengo, Yotuel Romero, Antonio Rayo Gibo
- Producer: Rafael Arcaute

Diego Torres singles chronology
| "No Alcanzan las Flores" (2010) | "Hoy Es Domingo" (2015) | "La Vida es un Vals" (2015) |

Rubén Blades singles chronology
| "La Perla" (2009) | "Hoy Es Domingo" (2015) |

"Hoy Es Domingo" (English: "Today is Sunday") is a Latin pop song written and performed by Argentine pop singer-songwriter Diego Torres released on July 10, 2015, as the first single off his eighth studio album Buena Vida. The track was co-written by Beatriz Luengo, Yotuel Romero and Antonio Rayo Gibo and features Panamanian artist Rubén Blades. "Hoy Es Domingo" received a nomination for Song of the Year at the 16th Latin Grammy Awards.

== Music video ==
The music video was filmed in Panamá City and Buenos Aires, Argentina, and features Torres and Blades enjoying a "Sunday afternoon", eating and drinking. The video was directed by Gus Carballo.

== Track listing ==
Digital download
| No. | Title | Writer(s) | Length |
|---|---|---|---|
| 1. | "Hoy Es Domingo" (featuring Rubén Blades) | Diego Torres, Beatriz Luengo, Yotuel Romero, Antonio Rayo Gibo | 4:37 |

== Charts ==
| Chart (2015) | Peak position |
|---|---|
| US Hot Latin Songs (Billboard) | 34 |
| US Latin Pop Airplay (Billboard) | 21 |
| US Tropical Airplay (Billboard) | 27 |
