= El Kilo =

Album by Orishas

Studio album by Orishas
- Released: March 29, 2005
- Genre: Latin hip hop, alternative hip hop
- Label: Universal Latino

Orishas chronology
Emigrante	El Kilo	Antidiotico

Singles from El Kilo
- 1. "Nací Orishas" Released: 2005; 2. "El Kilo" Released: 2005

El Kilo is the third album by Orishas, a Cuban hip hop group based in France. It was released on March 29, 2005, on the Universal Latino Label.

== Track listing ==
1. "Nací Orishas" - 4:53
2. "Distinto" - 4:04
3. "Elegante" - 3:59
4. "El Kilo" - 4:26
5. "Que Se Bote" - 4:14
6. "Reina De La Calle" - 4:24
7. "Bombo" - 3:31
8. "Al Que Le Guste" - 4:25
9. "Amor Al Arte" - 4:05
10. "Tumbando Y Dando" - 3:12
11. "La Calle" - 3:27
12. "Stress" - 4:04
13. "La Vacuna" - 4:06
14. "Quien Te Dijo" - 3:04

== Charts ==
=== Weekly charts ===
Chart (2005)	Peak position
Belgian Albums (Ultratop Flanders)	55
Belgian Albums (Ultratop Wallonia)	35
French Albums (SNEP)	63
German Albums (Offizielle Top 100)	61
Portuguese Albums (AFP)	13
Spanish Albums (PROMUSICAE)	4
Swiss Albums (Schweizer Hitparade)	6

=== Year-end charts ===
Chart (2005)	Position
Swiss Albums (Schweizer Hitparade)	53
