= Antidiotico =

Greatest hits album by Orishas
- Released: 2007
- Genre: Latin hip hop, alternative hip hop
- Label: Universal Latino

Orishas chronology
El Kilo (2005)	Antidiotico (2007)	Cosita Buena (2008)

Antidiotico is a greatest hits album by Orishas, a Cuban hip hop group based in France. It was released in 2007.

== Track listing ==
Disc 1

1. "Hay un Son" - 3:09
2. "A lo Cubano" - 4:04
3. "Elegante" - 3:58
4. "Emigrantes" - 3:35
5. "537 C.U.B.A." - 4:23
6. "Represent, Cuba" featuring Heather Headley - 3:43
7. "Naci Orishas" - 4:53
8. "¿Qué pasa?" - 3:42
9. "Silencio" - 4:19
10. "Connexion" - 4:13
11. "Habana" - 4:38
12. "El Kilo" - 4:25
13. "¿Qué Bola?" - 4:21
14. "¿Quién Te Dijo?" featuring Pitbull - 4:08
15. "Una Página Doblada" - 3:47

Disc 2

1. "Mistica"
2. "Desaparecidos"
3. "Bombo"
4. "Soy Guajiro" featuring Benny Moré
5. "Guadalupe Cuba" featuring Kayliah
6. "Sigue Sigue" featuring Da Weasel
7. "La Alianza" featuring Carlos Jean
8. "1999" (Malou Remix)
9. "Orishas Llego" (Cayo Hueso Remix)
10. "¿Que Pasa?" (Red Remix)

DVD (Music Videos)

1. "A Lo Cubano"
2. "537 C.U.B.A."
3. "Represent"
4. "¿Que Pasa?"
5. "Mujer"
6. "Habana"
7. "Naci Orishas"
8. "El Kilo"
