= Cosita Buena =

Studio album by Orishas
- Released: June 9, 2008
- Genres: Latin hip hop, alternative hip hop
- Length: 49:19
- Label: Universal Latino

Orishas chronology
Antidiotico	Cosita Buena

Cosita Buena is the fifth album by Orishas, a Cuban hip hop group based in France. It was released on June 9, 2008 on the Universal Latino label.

== Track listing ==
1. "Cosita Buena" - 3:32
2. "Maní" - 3:42
3. "Bruja" - 3:39
4. "Camina" - 3:45
5. "Guajira" - 3:44
6. "Borrón" - 3:33
7. "Mírame" - 4:19
8. "Que Quede Claro" - 4:09
9. "Machete" - 3:21
10. "Isi" - 4:13
11. "Público" - 3:37
12. "Melodías" - 3:49
13. "Hip Hop Conga" - 3:56
