= Distinto =

Studio album by Diego Torres
- Released: May 4, 2010
- Recorded: 2009–2010; Ask Studios (Madrid); BsAs (Concrete); Criteria Hit Factory; Picks & Hammers; Setai Studios; The Tiki Room (Miami); Woom Room (Los Angeles)
- Genres: Latin pop, soft rock
- Length: 34:48
- Labels: Universal Music Argentina, Universal Music Latino
- Producers: Rafael Arcaute, Diego Torres

Diego Torres chronology
Todos Éxitos (2008)	Distinto (2010)	Buena Vida (2015)

Singles from Distinto
- 1. "Guapa" Released: February 15, 2010; 2. "Mi Corazón Se Fue" Released: July 26, 2010; 3. "No Alcanzan las Flores" Released: October 11, 2010; 4. "El Mundo Sigue Igual" Released: March 14, 2011; 5. "Bendito" Released: August 29, 2011

Distinto is the seventh studio album (ninth overall) by Argentine latin pop singer Diego Torres, it was released on May 4, 2010, through Universal.

== Album information ==
The album is entirely produced by Rafael Arcaute, who has a background in Latin pop and Soft rock music. Prior to the release of the album, three promotional singles were released exclusively on Apple's iTunes Store.

It was preceded by the title single "Guapa" a song composed by himself alongside Noel Schajris and Luís Cardoso released on February 22, 2010, managed to provide Diego with a number-ten chart entry on the Billboard Top Latin Songs which peaked at number one. The second single was "Mi Corazón Se Fue" released in July 2010. It peaked at number twenty-six on the Latin Pop Songs, the third single was "No Alcanzan Las Flores" released in January 2011.

== Chart performance ==
The album debuted at number 33 on the Billboard Top Latin Albums, on the Latin Pop Albums the album debuted at number 8, becoming his highest debut on the U.S. charts compared to his previous albums. On the Spanish Albums Chart the album debuted at number 34 making it his second entry to the chart.

The album also debuted on the Mexican Albums Chart at number 21 and number 12 on the Mexican Pop Albums Chart.

== Track listing ==
No.	Title	Writer(s)	Length
1.	"Mi Corazón Se Fue"	Gianmarco/Diego Torres	3:46
2.	"Mirar Atrás" (featuring La Mala Rodríguez)	Rafael Arcaute/Luis Cardoso/Torres	3:17
3.	"Come On"	Torres/Polaco Wengrovski	3:31
4.	"Guapa"	Luis Cardoso/Noel Schajris/Torres	3:24
5.	"En Un Segundo"	Torres/Wengrovski	3:20
6.	"El Mundo Sigue Igual"	Torres/Wengrovski	3:55
7.	"Esto Es Lo Que Soy"	Arcaute/Gianmarco/Schajris/Torres	3:31
8.	"No Alcanzan Las Flores"	Claudia Brant/Torres/Wengrovski	3:43
9.	"Bendito" (featuring Kevin Johansen)	Arcaute/Gianmarco/Torres	3:22
10.	"Cuando No Queda Nada" (featuring Yotuel)	Arcaute/Brant/Torres/Wengrovski	3:03
Total length:			34:48

== Charts and sales ==
=== Charts ===
Chart (2010)	Peak position
Argentina Albums Chart	1
Mexican Albums Chart	20
Mexican Pop Albums Chart	12
Spanish Albums Chart	34
U.S. Billboard Top Latin Albums	31
U.S. Billboard Latin Pop Albums	5

=== Sales and certifications ===
Country	Certification (sales thresholds)
Chile	Gold
