= Andando =

Studio album by Diego Torres
- Released: August 8, 2006
- Recorded: 2006; Estudios Ion; Igloo Music (Burbank, California); JLG Estudio (Santo Domingo, Republica Dominicana)
- Genre: Latin pop
- Label: Sony Music
- Producer: Diego Torres

Diego Torres chronology
MTV Unplugged (2004)	Andando (2006)	Un Cachito de Mí: Grandes Éxitos (2008)

Singles from Andando
- 1. "Andando" Released: 2006; 2. "Abriendo Caminos" Released: 2006; 3. "Hasta Cuándo" Released: 2007

Andando is the sixth studio album (seventh overall) by Argentine Latin-pop singer-songwriter Diego Torres released on August 8, 2006 through Sony Music.

== Album information ==
He co-wrote and produced all of the album. The album was preceded by the title single "Andando", the second single was "Abriendo Caminos" featuring Dominican singer-songwriter Juan Luis Guerra which peaked at number 30 on the Billboard Top Latin Songs, the third and final was "Hasta Cuándo".

== Track listing ==
No.	Title	Length
1.	"Andando"	4:44
2.	"A Veces"	4:04
3.	"Hasta Cuándo"	4:09
4.	"Abriendo Caminos" (with Juan Luis Guerra)	4:14
5.	"Sé"	4:28
6.	"Ay! No Te Vayas"	4:15
7.	"Como Un Haz de Luna"	4:19
8.	"Búscame"	4:01
9.	"Por la Escalera"	4:10
10.	"Amores Que Matan"	4:52
11.	"Después de Ti"	4:35
12.	"Volver"	4:35
13.	"Por Ser Como Soy" (Ranchera) (Bonus track)	4:43

== Personnel ==
- Diego Sánchez - cello
- Diego Torres - chorus, rap, didgeridoo, vocals, realization, producer
- Luis Mansilla - engineer
- Pablo Etcheverry -piano, programming, hammond organ, keyboards
- Lucho González - arranger, direction
- Gabe Witcher - violin
- Afo Verde - guitar, A&R, harmonica
- Brigitta Danko - violin
- Claudio Divella - photography
- David Amaya - flamenco guitar
- Magalí Bachor - chorus
- Fabían Bertero - violin
- Martin Valenzuela - assistant
- Jorge Bergero - cello
- Rolfi Calahorrano - wind arrangements, arranger, charango, sax, tenor sax, fender rhodes, piano
- Luis Cardoso - electronics, programming, nylon string guitar, acoustic guitar
- Scott Conrad - production assistant
- Juan Escalona - trombone
- Fabrizio Lazzaro - executive producer, personal manager
- Alexander Batista - transverse flute, chorus
- Juan Armani - assistant
- Martin Bosa "Tucán" - keyboards, programming
- Carlos Goméz - drum technician
- Gustavo Borner - mastering, engineer

== Chart performance ==
Chart (2006)	Peak position
Argentina Albums Chart	1
Spanish Albums Chart	9
U.S. Billboard Top Latin Albums	63

== Sales and certifications ==
Region	Certification	Certified units/sales
Argentina (CAPIF)	Platinum	40,000^{^}
^{^} Shipments figures based on certification alone.
