= La Banda del Golden Rocket =

- Logo and main characters of the television series
- Genre: Teen drama
- Created by: Jorge Maestro; Sergio Vainman
- Directed by: Fernando Espinosa
- Starring: Adrián Suar; Diego Torres; Fabián Vena; Araceli Gonzalez
- Theme music composer: Alejandro Lerner
- Opening theme: Juntos para siempre
- Ending theme: Adios
- Country of origin: Argentina
- Original language: Spanish
- No. of seasons: 4
- No. of episodes: 108

Original release
- Network: Canal 13
- Release: September 1, 1991 – January 7, 1993

La banda del Golden Rocket (English: The Golden Rocket band) is a 1991 Argentine television series.

== Premise ==
The main characters were Diego, Adrián and Fabian, three distant cousins who dd not know each other, until they received a common heritage from their grandfather: an old yellow Oldsmobile Golden Rocket 88 from 1957, which is dubbed as the "Golden Rocket". The three cousins begin the work of maintaining the car, and have romantic affairs.

== Impact on the actors ==
Although the main characters are named after the actors playing them (Diego Torres, Adrián Suar and Fabián Vena), they were not starring as themselves; in fact, they were novice actors at the time. Even so, Diego Torres had some roles as a singer within the plot, and became a successful professional singer after the ending of the series. Similarly, the character Adrián had a romance within the series with "Pato", a character played by Araceli Gonzalez. Suar and González had a real romance afterwards, and got married.

Torres, Suar and Vena reunited in 2011 for some episodes of Los únicos. They did not play again their former characters, Suar and Vena were already recurring guest actors, and Torres was invited as well. Nevertheless, they made metafictional references to the old series, mainly the use of a similar car. The car, although similar to the one used twenty years before, was in fact a different one, as the owner of the previous car refused to give or rent it.

== Cast ==
Actor	Character
Adrián Suar	Adrián
Diego Torres	Diego
Fabián Vena	Fabián
Germán Palacios	Pablo
Julián Weich	Julián
Araceli González	Pato
Gloria Carrá	Evelyn
Marisa Mondino	Milly
Carolina Fal	Carolina
Fernán Mirás	
Andrea Pietra	
Eleonora Wexler	Cecilia
Viviana Puerta	
Nelly Beltrán	
Alicia Aller	
Hugo Arana	
Osvaldo Sabatini	
César Vianco	
Alejo García Pinto	
Claudio Gallardou	
Fabián Gianola	
Silvia Montanari	
Matías Baglivo	
Roberto Catarineu	
Andrea Accato	
Graciela Stefani	
Lara Zimmerman	
Mónica Gonzaga	

- EQUIPO TÉCNICO:
- Música: Mellino - Lerner
- Tema musical: Juntos para siempre
- Asesora de vestuario: Martha Trobbiani
- Asistente de vestuario: Jorge Barbagallo
- Escenografía: Seijas
- Iluminación: Julio Ronzetti - Norberto Maspoli - Guillermo Urdapilleta - Jorge Bonanno
- Coordinación de producción: Angel Rivero Díaz - Mónica Faccennini - Ezequiel Groisman
- Producción ejecutiva: Darío Alvarez - Matías Alonso-
- Puesta en escena: Alberto Ure - Carlos Evaristo
- Dirección: Fernando Espinosa - Guillermo Ibalo - Carlos Evaristo
