= Cantar Hasta Morir =

- Argentinian promo cover

Single by Diego Torres

from the album MTV Unplugged
- Released: April 22, 2004
- Genre: Acoustic, Latin pop
- Length: 4:32
- Label: Sony BMG
- Songwriter(s): Oney A. Cumba, Diego Torres, Alexander M. Batista
- Producer(s): Afo Verde, Diego Torres

Diego Torres singles chronology
"Perdidos En La Noche" (2002)	"Cantar Hasta Morir" (2004)	"Tratar De Estar Mejor" (2004)

"Cantar Hasta Morir" (transl. "Sing Until You Die") is the lead single from Diego Torres's first live album (sixth overall) MTV Unplugged released on April 22, 2004.

== Background and performance ==
The song is written and produced by himself along with Oney Alexander Cumba and Alexander Manuel Batista, also produced by Afo Verde who produced the album along him.

=== Music video ===
The music video is simply the live performance of the Unplugged, it shows him sitting, singing the song using a green sleeveless shirt and a leather pants. The live performance and the Unplugged were premiered on April 22, 2004 through MTV.

== Charts ==
Chart (2004)	Peak position
U.S. Billboard Hot Latin Songs	15
U.S. Billboard Latin Pop Songs	8
U.S. Billboard Tropical Songs	17
