= Mamichula =

2020 single by Trueno, Nicki Nicole and Bizarrap

Single by Trueno, Nicki Nicole and Bizarrap

from the album Atrevido
- Released: July 24, 2020
- Genre: Latin trap
- Length: 3:40
- Label: Neuen
- Songwriter(s): Mateo Palacios Corazzina; Nicole Denise Cucco
- Producer(s): Bizarrap; Taiu; Tatool

Trueno singles chronology
"Azul y Oro" (2020)	"Mamichula" (2020)	"Jugador del Año" (2020)

Nicki Nicole singles chronology
"Colocao" (2020)	"Mamichula" (2020)	"Mala Vida" (2020)

Bizarrap singles chronology
"Zaramay: Bzrp Music Sessions Vol. 31" (2020)	"Mamichula" (2020)	"Cazzu: Bzrp Music Sessions Vol. 32" (2020)

"Mamichula" is a song by Argentine rappers Trueno and Nicki Nicole and Argentine record producer Bizarrap. It was released on July 24, 2020. The music video for the song has more than 410 million views on YouTube. It was released as the third single from Trueno's debut album Atrevido.

== Background ==
The song was produced by Taiu and Tatool. The music video for the song was directed by Lucas Vignale. The video of the song reached one million views in just a few hours on YouTube. The song reached number one in Argentina, Spain and several Latin American countries.

== Charts ==
=== Weekly charts ===
Weekly chart performance for "Mamichula"
Chart (2020)	Peak position
Argentina (Argentina Hot 100)	1
Argentina Airplay (Monitor Latino)	10
Argentina Latin Airplay (Monitor Latino)	8
Argentina National Songs (Monitor Latino)	2
Global 200 (Billboard)	100
Spain (PROMUSICAE)	1

Weekly chart performance for "Mamichula"
Chart (2024)	Peak position
Argentina (Argentina Hot 100)	14
Bolivia Songs (Billboard)	8
Chile Songs (Billboard)	14
Colombia Songs (Billboard)	24
Ecuador Songs (Billboard)	6
Peru Songs (Billboard)	4
Spain (PROMUSICAE)	15

=== Monthly charts ===
Monthly chart performance for "Mamichula"
Chart (2020)	Peak position
Argentina Digital Songs (CAPIF)	1
Paraguay (SGP)	79

=== Year-end charts ===
2020 year-end chart performance for "Mamichula"
Chart (2020)	Position
Spain (PROMUSICAE)	30

== Certifications ==
Certifications and sales for "Mamichula"
Region	Certification	Certified units/sales
Argentina (CAPIF)	3× Platinum	60,000^{*}
Mexico (AMPROFON)	2× Platinum	120,000^{‡}
Spain (PROMUSICAE)	5× Platinum	300,000^{‡}
Uruguay (CUD)	2× Platinum	8,000^{^}
^{*} Sales figures based on certification alone.^{^} Shipments figures based on certification alone.^{‡} Sales+streaming figures based on certification alone.

== See also ==
- List of Billboard Argentina Hot 100 number-one singles of 2020
