= Orishas (band) =

Cuban musical group; hip hop

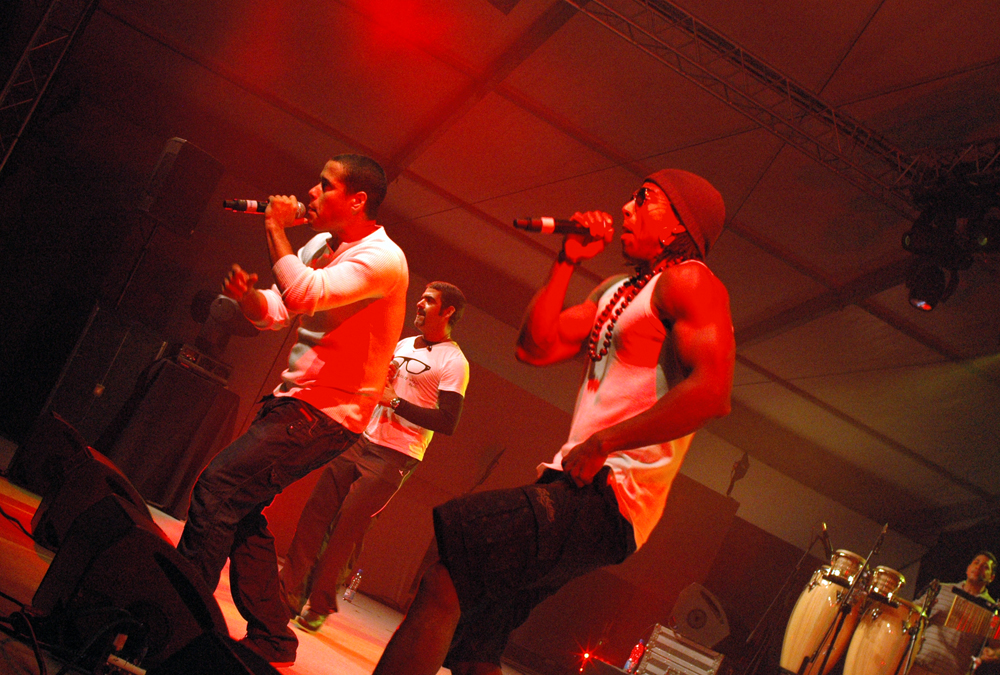

Background information
- Origin: Havana, Cuba
- Genres: Latin hip hop; alternative hip hop
- Years active: 1999–present
- Labels: Universal Latino Label
- Members: Yotuel Romero; Roldán González
- Past members: Flaco-Pro; Ruzzo Medina
- Website: orishasthebest.com (archived)

Orishas are a Cuban hip hop group from Havana, Cuba, founded in 1999. The group was first called "Amenaza", "threat" or "menace" in Spanish, and appealed to the Cuban youth. The choice of this name for the hip hop group is a way of creating a direct link between this band and the African diaspora. The group is based in France where they made a deal with a record company, although they visit Cuba frequently. In 1999 Fidel Castro threw a party for them and had a meeting with all the musicians. It was the first time the Cuban government showed support for hip hop music. The group was and still is popular in Europe (especially France, Italy, Spain and Portugal) and Latin America. Yotuel Romero and Ruzzo Medina, who moved from Havana to Paris as part of an international studies program, joined Roldán González and Flaco-Pro to form the band in 1999. Their work is influenced by the hip hop movement as well as Cuban and other Latin rhythms. As of November 2024, they had produced a total of five studio albums and a greatest hits album; their latest album is Gourmet (released May 25, 2018). In 2009 they participated in the concert Paz Sin Fronteras II in Plaza de la Revolución, Havana, Cuba. Orishas reunited to record new material in 2016.

The name "Orishas" refers to the set of deities worshipped in African-based religions in the Americas, like Santería in Cuba and Candomblé in Brazil, resulting from the relocation of enslaved Yoruba. These orishas each represent a natural element (such as the ocean or leaves) and exhibit a human characteristic (such as motherhood or love). This link is evident in the group's lyrics, for example those of "Nací Orichas" and "Canto Para Elewa Y Changó". The group's success is a testament to both the international appeal of the group itself as well as the global popularity of Cuban culture. As of October 2009, the band consists of three members: Yotuel, Ruzzo and Roldán. Flaco-Pro left the group in 2002 before the release of its second studio album, Emigrante. The band members live in distributed locations in Europe (Roldán in Paris, Ruzzo in Milan, and Yotuel in Madrid). In 2007, they collaborated with Puerto Rican group Calle 13 on the song "Pa'l Norte" (from the album Residente o Visitante). The song won a Latin Grammy for Best Urban Song.

== Career ==
=== History ===
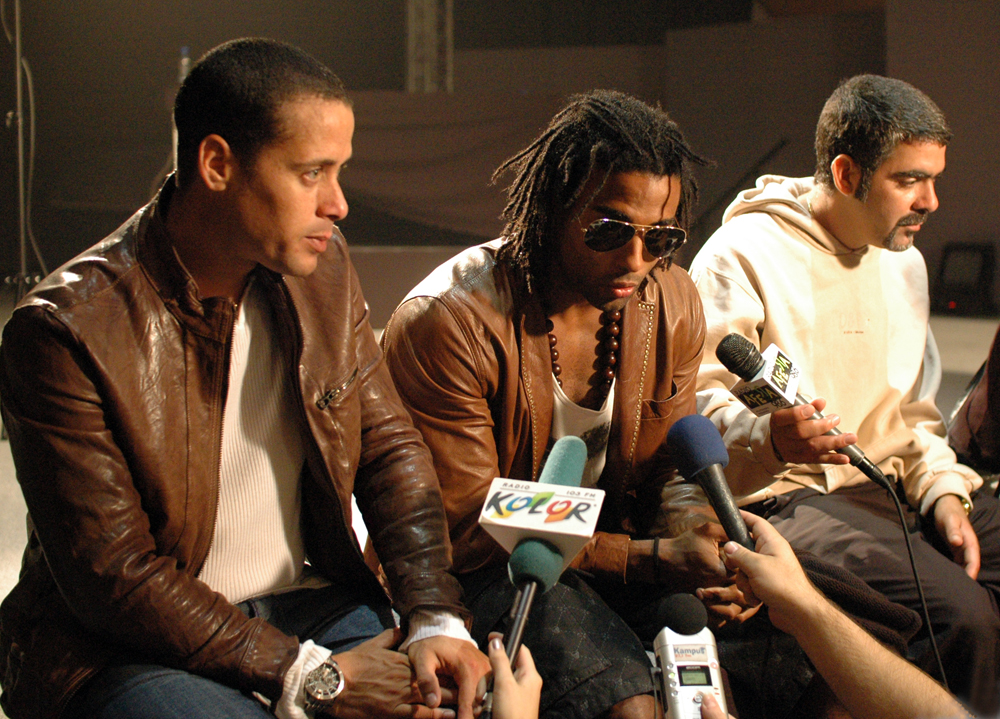
Orishas at an interview in Warsaw, Poland in September 2009

Los Orishas began as Cuban rap group Amenaza in the early 1990s. Led by Joel Pando, Amenaza became the first rap group to address the issue of racial identity in Cuban society. In 1998, the members of Amenaza traveled to Paris to perform and accepted a record deal with a European label. The transition to Europe was critical in their musical career, as many rap groups in Cuba lacked the resources for professional recordings. In fact, of the hundreds of rappers in Cuba, Orishas is the only group that has achieved international acclaim As of 2006. Their first album, A Lo Cubano, was released in Spain in May 1999 under the Orishas moniker. In the summer of 1999, Orishas began a two-year tour across Europe and the United States, which brought them international notice. In December 2000, Orishas returned to Cuba to perform two concerts, attracting tens-of-thousands of young Cubans.

As one of Cuba's pioneer rap groups, Orishas garnered fame both at home and abroad. In 2006 they guested on the Track "14Me" recorded in Cuba by occasional The Black Eyed Peas producer Poet Name Life. The track was eventually released on the album "The Revolution Presents: Revolution", (Studio !K7 & Rapster Records) a Cuban dance crossover album which also featured Norman Cook a.k.a. Fatboy Slim, Róisín Murphy and Rich File from UK Trip Hop pioneers Unkle. As of October 2009, the members of the trio currently live in different European cities (Madrid, Milan, Paris), with the band based in France. Their incorporation of traditional Cuban beats like salsa and rumba into their rapping is an angle that brings appeal to older Cubans, while simultaneously driving some aspiring Cuban rappers to "look at them with both awe and disappointment" for "selling out to commercial pressures to evoke Cuban nostalgia." Roldan himself has a tendency towards traditional Cuban music, and purposely distances his music from some of the stereotypical characteristics of hip-hop, such as the degrading treatment of women and "everything [else] you do in U.S. hip hop shows".

== Discography ==
=== Studio albums ===
- A Lo Cubano (2000)
- Emigrante (2002)
- El Kilo (2005)
- Cosita Buena (2008)
- Gourmet (2018)

=== Compilations ===
- Antidiotico (2007)

=== Singles ===
- "Atrevido" (A Lo Cubano)
- "Orishas Llegó" (A Lo Cubano)
- "Testimonio" (Emigrante)
- "Mujer" (Emigrante)
- "Guajiro" (Emigrante)
- "Represent" (A Lo Cubano)
- "Cuba Isla Bella" (Gourmet)
- "Everyday" (Gourmet)
- "Bembé" (Gourmet)
- "Sastre de tu amor" (Gourmet)

=== Film soundtracks ===
- The Fast and the Furious - song Atrevido (not featured on the CD release of The Fast and the Furious Soundtrack)
- El Benny - song Soy Campesino
- Dirty Dancing: Havana Nights - song Represent Cuba
- The Fast and the Furious - song Atrevido
- Antikiller - songs Represent and Madre
- Bad Boys 2 - song Atrevido (not featured on the CD release of the Bad Boys 2 Soundtrack)
- Along Came Polly - song Represent

== Band members ==
=== Current As of 2025 ===
- Yotuel (Yotuel Omar Romero Manzanares) - (1999–present)
- Roldán (Roldán González Rivero) - (1999–present)
- Ruzzo (Hiram Riverí Medina) - (1999–2021)
