= Diego Torres (album) =

Studio album by Diego Torres
- Released: June 8, 1992
- Recorded: 1991–1992
- Studio: Chulo Studios, Panda Studios, SPA Studios, Electric Lady
- Genre: Latin pop
- Label: RCA Records
- Producer: Cachorro Lopez

Diego Torres chronology
Diego Torres (1992)	Tratar de Estar Mejor (1994)

Singles from Diego Torres
- 1. "Estamos Juntos" Released: 1992; 2. "Puedo Decir Que Sí" Released: 1992

Diego Torres is the debut studio album by Argentine singer-songwriter Diego Torres, it was released on June 8, 1992 through RCA Records.

== Track listing ==
1. "Chalamán" (Melingo)
2. "Estamos Juntos" (Torres/López/Tomas/Brandt)
3. "Puedo Decir Que Si"(Torres/López/Brandt)
4. "Esperándote" (Torres/López/Tomas)
5. "Sintonía Americana" (Abuelo/López)
6. "No Tengas Miedo" (Torres/López)
7. "Es Lo Que Siento" (López/Brandt)
8. "Alguien La Vio Partir" (Torres/López/Tomas)
9. "Yo Te Vi" (Torres/Brandt/Carrol/Payne)
10. "Fiesta De Vagabundos" (Torres/López/Tomas)

== Certification ==
Region	Certification	Certified units/sales
Argentina (CAPIF)	2× Platinum	120,000^{^}
^{^} Shipments figures based on certification alone.
