= Buena Vida (album) =

Studio album by Diego Torres
- Released: October 9, 2015
- Genre: Latin pop
- Label: Sony Music

Diego Torres chronology
Distinto (2010)	Buena Vida (2015)	Atlántico a Pie (2021)

Singles from Buena Vida
- 1. "Hoy Es Domingo" Released: July 10, 2015; 2. "La Vida Es Un Vals" Released: October 31, 2015; 3. "Iguales" Released: January 29, 2016

Buena Vida is the eighth studio album (tenth overall) by Argentine latin pop singer Diego Torres, it was released on October 9, 2015, through Sony Music.

It earned Torres a Grammy Award nomination for Best Latin Pop Album. It was also nominated Album of the Year and Best Traditional Pop Vocal Album at the 17th Annual Latin Grammy Awards.

== Track listing ==
No.	Title	Length
1.	"La Vida Es Un Vals"	3:45
2.	"Hoy Es Domingo" (with Rubén Blades)	4:37
3.	"Aquí Estoy Yo"	3:58
4.	"Iguales"	3:35
5.	"Mucho Más Allá"	3:15
6.	"Por Ellas" (with ChocQuibTown)	3:37
7.	"Fin del Mundo"	3:45
8.	"Como Agua En El Desierto"	3:20
9.	"Sin Ti Conmigo"	4:01
10.	"Contradicción"	3:40
11.	"La Grieta"	3:34

Bonus track
No.	Title	Length
12.	"El Camino" (with Ángela Torres)	3:28

== Charts ==
Chart (2015)	Peak position
Spanish Albums (PROMUSICAE)	81
US Top Latin Albums (Billboard)	38
US Latin Pop Albums (Billboard)	13
