= Un Mundo Diferente =

Studio album by Diego Torres
- Released: November 20, 2001 (Argentina); April 23, 2002 (Worldwide)
- Recorded: 2000–2001 (Buenos Aires, Madrid, Miami, and Milan)
- Genre: Latin pop, flamenco, rhumba
- Length: 60:00
- Label: Sony Latin
- Producer: Kike Santander, Cachorro López, Rolfi Calahorrano, Diego Torres (co-producer)

Diego Torres chronology
Tal Cual Es (1999)	Un Mundo Diferente (2001)	MTV Unplugged (2004)

Singles from Un Mundo Diferente
- 1. "Color Esperanza" Released: 2001; 2. "Sueños" Released: 2001; 3. "Que No Me Pierda" Released: 2002; 4. "Perdidos en la Noche" Released: 2002

Professional ratings
Review scores
Source	Rating
Allmusic	3/5 stars
Amazon	5/5 stars

Un Mundo Diferente (English: "A Different World") is the fifth studio album by Argentine singer-songwriter Diego Torres, it was released on October 31, 2001, through Sony Latin.

== Album information ==
Mostly comprises different traditional Latin rhythms in a contemporary style. Co-produced by Kike Santander and Cachorro López, this 13-track album was recorded in Buenos Aires, Madrid, Miami, and Milan. The album is considered as one of his best-selling album in his native Argentina.

It was preceded by the title single "Color Esperanza" a song composed by himself alongside Cachorro López and Coti Sorokin, also is considered as an anthem of hope due to the content of the lyrics. The song became his most popular song since was performed specially for Juan Pablo II. The album had two other singles "Sueños" and "Que No Me Pierda".

== Track listing ==
No.	Title	Writer(s)	Length
1.	"Color Esperanza"	Cachorro López/Coti Sorokin/Diego Torres	4:26
2.	"Una Gotita de Tu Amor"	A. Carmona/López/Torres	3:49
3.	"Quisiera"	Rolfi Calahorrano/Juan Carlos Gómez/Torres/Joseline Vargas	4:58
4.	"Por Ti Yo Iré"	Kike Santander/Torres	4:46
5.	"Conmigo Siempre"	S. Baylac/López/Sebastián Schon/Torres	4:19
6.	"Sueños"	López/Sebastián Schon/Torres	3:46
7.	"Que No Me Pierda"	Gustavo Santander	5:05
8.	"Si Tú Te Vas"	Torres/Marcelo Wengrovski	4:32
9.	"Alegría"	Baylac/López/Torres	2:42
10.	"Perdidos en la Noche"	Santander/Santander	3:54
11.	"No Me Olvides"	López/Sorokin/Torres	3:51
12.	"Soy de la Gente"	Alexander Batista/A. Frometa/L. Mola/Torres	4:45
13.	"A Través del Tiempo" (Bonus Track)	Rolfi Calahorrano/T. Fernandez Fiks/Torres	6:37
Total length:			60:00

== Sales and certifications ==
Region	Certification	Certified units/sales
Argentina (CAPIF)	4× Platinum	160,000^{^}
^{^} Shipments figures based on certification alone.

== See also ==
- List of best-selling albums in Argentina
