= Guapa (song) =

2010 single by Diego Torres

Single by Diego Torres

from the album Distinto
- Released: February 15, 2010
- Recorded: 2010
- Genre: Latin pop, soft rock
- Length: 3:24
- Label: Universal
- Songwriters: Diego Torres, Noel Schajris, Luís Cardoso
- Producers: Rafael Arcaute, Diego Torres

Diego Torres singles chronology
| "Hasta Cuándo" (2007) | "Guapa" (2010) | "Mi Corazón Se Fue" (2010) |

"Guapa" (transl. "Pretty") is a Latin pop song co-written and performed by the Argentine pop singer-songwriter Diego Torres and released on February 15, 2010, as the first single from his seventh studio album Distinto.

== Song information ==
The song is co-written by former Sin Bandera, Noel Schajris and Luís Cardoso, and produced by himself and Rafael Arcaute. The song managed to provide Diego with a number-ten chart entry on the Billboard Top Latin Songs which peaked at number one, becoming on his first number one single on the chart, also is charted at number one on the Latin Pop Songs, making his second number one on this chart after "Se Que Ya No Volverás" in 1997.

== Music video ==
Diego and his "guardian angel" in the music video.

The music video was filmed in Argentina in February 2010 and was directed by Jorge Caterbona with whom Diego has worked in other videos. In the video, Diego is accompanied by a guardian angel in his daily life. The video features Ricardo Darín who narrates the voice of the angel, Andrea Prieta as his wife and Federico D’Elia as his strict boss.

== Track listing ==
Digital download
| No. | Title | Writer(s) | Length |
|---|---|---|---|
| 1. | "Guapa" | Diego Torres, Noel Schajris, Luís Cardoso | 3:24 |

== Charts and sales ==
=== Weekly charts ===
| Chart (2010) | Peak position |
|---|---|
| Perú (UNIMPRO) | 8 |
| Spain (Promusicae) | 46 |
| Spanish Airplay Chart | 7 |
| US Hot Latin Songs (Billboard) | 1 |
| US Latin Pop Airplay (Billboard) | 1 |
| US Tropical Airplay (Billboard) | 5 |
| Venezuelan Airplay Chart | 42 |
| Venezuelan Latin Airplay Chart | 14 |

=== Year-end charts ===
| Chart (2010) | Position |
|---|---|
| US Latin Songs | 46 |
| US Latin Pop Songs | 17 |

== Certifications ==
| Country | Certification (sales thresholds) |
|---|---|
| Argentina | Gold (CAPIF) |
