= Luna Nueva (Diego Torres album) =

Studio album by Diego Torres
- Released: December 17, 1996
- Recorded: 1996
- Genre: Latin pop
- Label: RCA Records

Diego Torres chronology
Tratar de Estar Mejor (1994)	Luna Nueva (1996)	Tal Cual Es (1999)

Singles from Luna Nueva
- 1. "Sé Que Ya No Volverás" Released: 1996; 2. "No lo Soñé" Released: 1996; 3. "Penélope" Released: 1997; 4. "Sé Que Hay Algo Más" Released: 1997; 5. "Alba" Released: 1997

Luna Nueva is the third studio album by Argentine singer-songwriter Diego Torres. It was recorded in Bologna and released on December 17, 1996 through RCA Records. The music video for the single "Sé Que Ya No Volverás" was nominated for a Lo Nuestro Award.

== Track listing ==
1. Luna nueva. (Torres/Tomas/Wengrovski)
2. Quise olvidar. (Torres/Tomas/Wengrovski)
3. No lo soñé. (Torres/Tomas/Wengrovski)
4. Sé que ya no volverás. (Torres/Tomas/Wengrovski)
5. Sé que hay algo más. (Torres/Fernández)
6. Se dejaba llevar por ti. (Vega)
7. Siempre hay un camino. (Torres/Tomas/Wengrovski)
8. No todo está perdido. (Torres/Tomas/Wengrovski)
9. Alba. (Flores)
10. Océano. (Djavan)
11. Cuando el mundo da vueltas. (Torres/Tomas/Wengrovski)

== Personnel ==
- Guitar: Michael Landau, José Miguel Moreno, Marcelo Wengrovski
- Bass: Bob Birch, John Pena, Neil Stubenhaus
- Drums: Greg Bissonette, Joey Heredia, Jota Morelli
- Keyboards: Alex Alessandroni, Dany Tomas, Celso Valli
- Percussion: Greg Bissonette, Lenny Castro, Antonio Carmona
- Brass: Sandro Comini, Marco Tamburini
- Saxophone: Paride Sforza, Steve Tavaglione
- Background Vocals: Alex Baroni, Alex Brown, Bridgette Bryant, Luis Carmona, Aida Cooper, Phillip Ingram, Antonio Carmona, Antonella Pepe, Silver Pozzoli

== Certification ==
Region	Certification	Certified units/sales
Argentina (CAPIF)	Platinum	85,000
