= MTV Unplugged (Diego Torres album) =

Live album by Diego Torres
- Released: May 4, 2004; Mar 1, 2005 (CD+DVD)
- Recorded: March 4, 2004 (Baires Studios from Don Torcuato; Buenos Aires, Argentina)
- Genre: Acoustic, candombe
- Length: 77:42
- Label: Sony BMG, RCA
- Producer: Afo Verde, Diego Torres

Diego Torres chronology
Un Mundo Diferente (2001)	MTV Unplugged (2004)	Andando (2006)

Alternate cover
- CD+DVD Edition

Professional ratings
Review scores
Source	Rating
Allmusic	4/5 stars

MTV Unplugged is a 2004 Grammy Award-nominated live MTV Unplugged acoustic performance by Argentine-born musician Diego Torres released in 2004 as an album and in 2005 as a DVD. Recorded in March, 2004 in Buenos Aires, Argentina, it is rated as one of his best-ever live performances.

== Release ==
=== Singles ===
- Cantar Hasta Morir (2004)
- Tratar de Estar Mejor (2004)
- Sueños (with Julieta Venegas) (2005)
- Déjame Entrar (2005)

== Track listing ==
No.	Title	Writer(s)	Length
1.	"Deja de Pedir Perdon"	Diego Torres/Cachorro López	4:12
2.	"No lo Soñé"	Dany Tomas/Torres/Marcelo Wengrovsky	4:26
3.	"Se Que Ya No Volverás"	Tomas/Torres/Wengrovsky	5:02
4.	"Cantar Hasta Morir"	Batista, A./Sánchez, Oney A. Cumba/Torres	4:32
5.	"Qué Será"	Fontana/Grece/Migliacci/Pes	4:22
6.	"La Última Noche"	Amed, R./Baylak, S./López/Torres	4:10
7.	"Alguien la Vio Partir"	López/Tomas/Torres	4:48
8.	"Déjame Entrar"	Pablo Etcheverry/Torres	4:50
9.	"Alba"	Antonio Flores	4:37
10.	"Sueños" (with Julieta Venegas)	López/Sebastián Schon/Torres	4:35
11.	"Dónde Van"	Pablo Duchovny/Coty Sorokin/Torres	3:28
12.	"Tal Vez"	Torres/Afo Verde	3:55
13.	"Usted" (with Vicentico)	Gabriel Fernández Capello/Torres	4:47
14.	"Tratar de Estar Mejor"	López/Torres	4:28
15.	"Penélope"	Augusto Algueró/Joan Manuel Serrat	4:58
16.	"Que No Me Pierda"	Gustavo Santander	5:23
17.	"Color Esperanza" (with La Chilinguita)	López/Sorokin/Torres	5:09

== Charts and sales ==
=== Charts ===
Chart (2004)	Peak position
Argentina Albums Chart	5
Mexican Albums Chart	2
U.S. Billboard Top Latin Albums	45
U.S. Billboard Latin Pop Albums	13

=== Sales and certifications ===
Region	Certification	Certified units/sales
Argentina (CAPIF)	4× Platinum	160,000^{^}
Central America (CFC)	Gold	10,000
Chile	—	12,000
Mexico (AMPROFON)	2× Platinum	200,000^{‡}
Mexico (AMPROFON) DVD	Gold	10,000^{^}
^{^} Shipments figures based on certification alone.^{‡} Sales+streaming figures based on certification alone.
