= Emigrante (Orishas album) =

Studio album by Orishas
- Released: June 11, 2002
- Genre: Latin hip hop, alternative hip hop
- Label: Universal Latino

Orishas chronology
A Lo Cubano	Emigrante	El Kilo

Emigrante is the follow-up to the well-received début album, A Lo Cubano, by the Cuban hip hop band Orishas. The album was released on June 11, 2002, after Flaco-Pro left the band.

== Track listing ==
1. "¿Que Pasa?" – 3:41
2. "Mujer" – 3:49
3. "Guajiro" – 3:19
4. "Que Bola" – 4:21
5. "Asi Fue" – 3:49
6. "Niños" – 3:49
7. "300 Kilos" – 4:05
8. "Gladiadores" – 4:05
9. "Ausencia" – 3:35
10. "Habana" – 3:38
11. "Testimonio" – 4:38
12. "El Rey De La Pachacha" – 4:09
13. "Emigrantes" – 3:45
14. "Desaparecidos" – 3:49
15. "La Vida Pasa" – 3:47

== Charts ==
=== Weekly charts ===
Chart (2002)	Peak position
Belgian Albums (Ultratop Flanders)	43
Belgian Albums (Ultratop Wallonia)	21
French Albums (SNEP)	55
German Albums (Offizielle Top 100)	80
Swiss Albums (Schweizer Hitparade)	7

=== Year-end charts ===
Chart (2002)	Position
Belgian Albums (Ultratop Wallonia)	89
Swiss Albums (Schweizer Hitparade)	95

== Certifications ==
Region	Certification	Certified units/sales
Spain (PROMUSICAE)	Gold	50,000^{^}
^{^} Shipments figures based on certification alone.
