= Atrevido (album) =

2020 studio album by Trueno

Studio album by Trueno
- Released: 23 July 2020
- Genres: Trap; hip-hop; rap; latin trap; reggaeton
- Length: 30:19
- Labels: NEUEN; Sony Music Latin
- Producers: Taiu; Tatool; Yesan; XOVOX; Oniria; Evlay; Bizarrap

Trueno chronology
Atrevido (2020)	Atrevido en Vivo (2021)

Singles from Atrevido
- 1. "Atrevido" Released: 20 February 2020; 2. "Azul y Oro Freestyle" Released: 25 March 2020; 3. "Mamichula" Released: 23 July 2020; 4. "Background" Released: 30 November 2020; 5. "Ñeri" Released: 23 December 2020; 6. "Rain II" Released: 19 March 2021

Atrevido (transl. "Daring") is the debut studio album by Argentine rapper Trueno. It was released on 23 July 2020 through NEUEN and distributed by Sony Music Latin. This is the first full-length album that Trueno released after announcing his retirement from freestyle battles. The album features the collaborations of artists such as Alemán, Wos and Nicki Nicole. The album also features XOVOX, Oniria, Evlay and Bizarrap productions, although the album was produced entirely by Taiu and Tatool.

== Background ==
On February 20, 2020, Trueno released the single "Atrevido" which would be the first single from the album, the song reached number 31 on the Billboard Argentina Hot 100 chart. On March 25, 2020 he released the single "Azul y Oro Freestyle", a song in which he shows us his skills for freestyle. After the single was released, Trueno announced his retirement from freestyle battles and announced the release of his first album along with the release date as it was planned to be released in March.

The name of the album would be Atrevido, it is known that it will be composed of the homonymous song "Atrevido", by the freestyle "Azul y Oro" and a song with Nicki Nicole produced by Bizarrap.

== Singles and promotion ==
After the first singles "Atrevido" and "Azul y Oro Freestyle" had been released, Trueno and his father MC Peligro published a promotional photo for the album's release on their Instagram accounts, although at first it was believed that it would be the cover from the album. On July 23, 2020, just the day the album was released, Trueno released the third single "Mamichula" with Argentine rapper Nicki Nicole and produced by renowned Argentine producer Bizarrap. Just days before the release of the single Trueno and Nicki Nicole confirmed their relationship. The song was a great success in Argentina and all of Latin America reaching number 1 on the Argentina Hot 100 and Spain charts reaching 200 million views on YouTube in four months.

On November 30, 2020, the single “Background” was released along with its music video. On December 23, 2020 Trueno released the fifth single from the album entitled "Ñeri", a reggaeton song where the video was recorded at the La Bombonera Stadium, where the Argentine soccer club Boca Juniors plays, a team that Trueno is a fan of, the song reached number 44 on the Argentina Hot 100 chart. Finally, on March 19, 2021, the sixth and last single from the album "Rain II" was released along with its music video, the song debuted at number 76 on the Argentina Hot 100 chart and at number 95 in Spain.

== Critical and reception ==
The reviews for the album were largely favorable from music critics and audiences, Alex Delgado Martinez for MEW Magazine gave the album a good score mentioning "The Argentine artist at 18 years of age, has managed to gain a place thanks to his identity mark being the spokesperson for a generation." He also expressed about the single "Mamichula", "It is a song with Nicki Nicole that is the theme that closes the album, with Bizarrap as part of the production. The single does not disappoint and knows how to trap the listener in an atmosphere other than the usual." Tomas Barbajelata for El Estilo Libre mentioned Trueno and the album: "With his unique style and his incredible ease of flowing over any instrument, regardless of the genre, Trueno quickly became one of the most complete and listened to artists on today. " Giving the album a good rating.

== Commercial performance ==
The album spent several weeks in the top on various digital platforms such as Spotify, iTunes, Apple Music among others. The album reached number 4 on its debut in Spain. At the beginning of 2021 the album was certified 4× platinum in Argentina by CAPIF. The singles on the album were not without certifications either, since "Mamichula" was certified 3× platinum in Argentina, 4× platinum in Spain, 2× platinum in Mexico and Uruguay and platinum in Chile, "Atrevido" was certified platinum in Argentina and gold in Mexico and Spain, "Ñeri" gold record in Argentina, Spain and Uruguay and “Sangria” with a platinum record in Argentina and a gold record in Spain and Uruguay.

== Track listing ==
All tracks were written by Mateo Palacios Corazzina and produced by Taiu and Tatool, except where noted.

Atrevido track listing
No.	Title	Writer(s)	Producer(s)	Length
1.	"2.0.1.9"		Taiu; Tatool; Yesan	1:39
2.	"Rain II"		Taiu; Tatool; XOVOX	3:20
3.	"Atrevido"		Taiu; Tatool; Oniria	3:23
4.	"Cucumelo"			2:35
5.	"G.P.S." (with Alemán)	Mateo Palacios Corazzina; Erik Alemán		3:47
6.	"Azul y Oro Freestyle"			3:15
7.	"Sangría" (with Wos)	Corazzina; Valentín Oliva	Taiu; Tatool; Evlay	2:35
8.	"Ñeri"			3:16
9.	"Background"			2:54
10.	"Mamichula" (with Nicki Nicole and Bizarrap)	Corazzina; Nicole Denise Cucco; Gózalo Julián Conde	Bizarrap; Taiu; Tatool	3:40
Total length:				30:19

== Personnel ==
Credits adapted from Genius.

Primary artists

- Trueno – lead vocals, songwriter, composition
- Alemán – featured vocals, songwriter
- Wos – featured vocals, songwriter
- Nicki Nicole – featured vocals, songwriter

Additional musicians

- Marcos Longobardi – accordion
- Juan Iraeta – bass
- Hernán Segret – double bass
- Luis Alberto Ramírez – fiddle
- Pedro Pasquale – guitar, mandolin, cuban tres
- Renzo Luca – guitar
- Rodó Bustos – percussion, mixing
- Juan Damiani – piano

Production

- Taiu – producer, composition
- Tatool – producer, composition
- Yesan – producer, composition
- XOVOX – producer, composition
- Oniria – producer, composition
- Evlay – producer, composition, recording engineer
- Bizarrap – producer, composition, songwriter, recording engineer
- Carlos Laurenz – mastering
- Brian Taylor – mixing
- NEUEN – executive producer
- El Dorado – artwork

== Charts ==
=== Weekly charts ===
Weekly chart performance for Atrevido
Chart (2020)	Peak position
Spanish Albums (Promusicae)	4

=== Year-end charts ===
Year-end chart performance for Atrevido
Chart (2020)	Position
Spanish Albums (PROMUSICAE)	93

== Certifications ==
Region	Certification	Certified units/sales
Argentina (CAPIF)	4× Platinum	80,000^{^}
^{^} Shipments figures based on certification alone.

== Release history ==
Region	Date	Label	Format	Ref
Various	July 23, 2020	NEUEN; Sony Music Latin	Digital download, Streaming	
