= Patria o Muerte, Venceremos =

National motto of Cuba

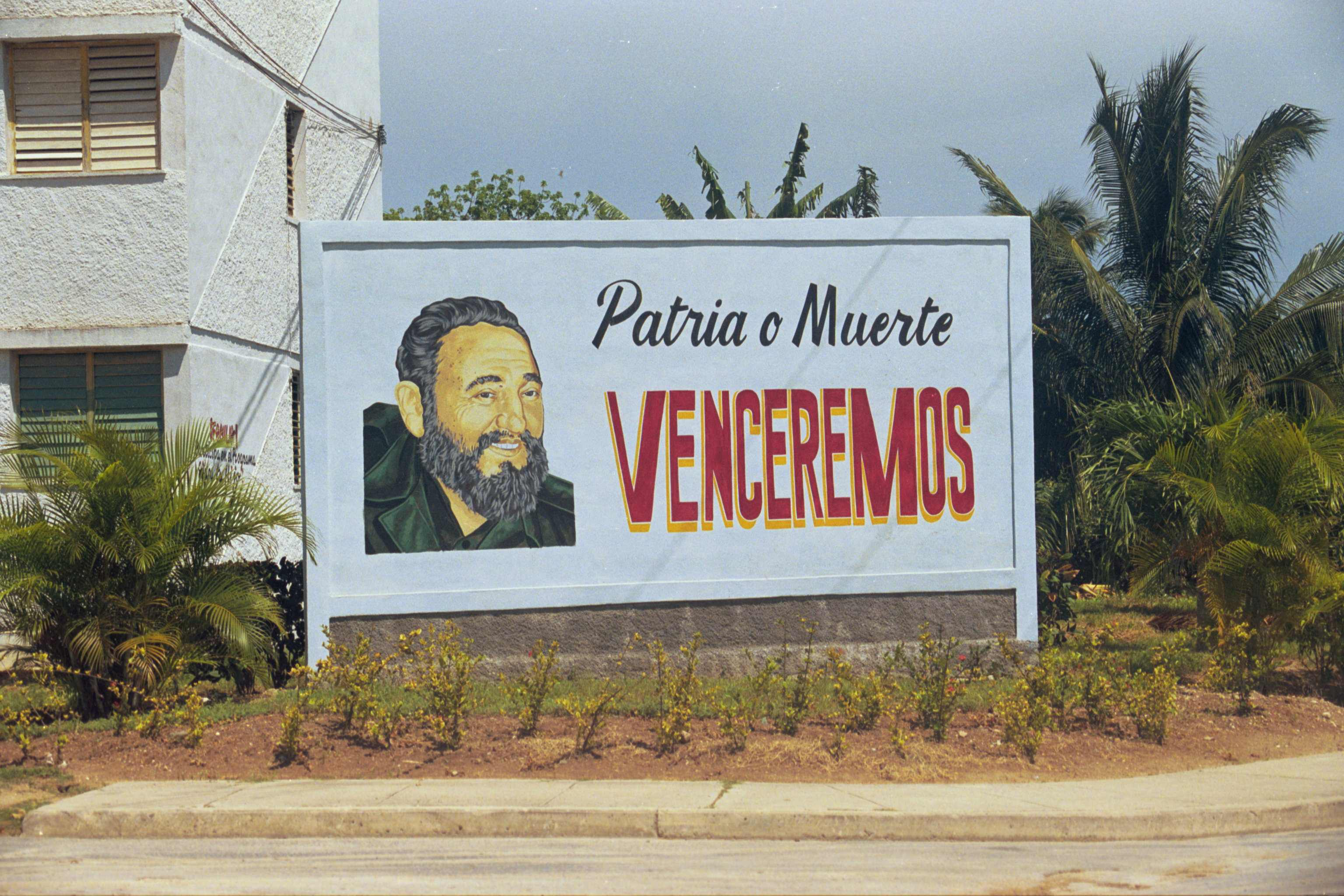
Propaganda poster bearing the motto

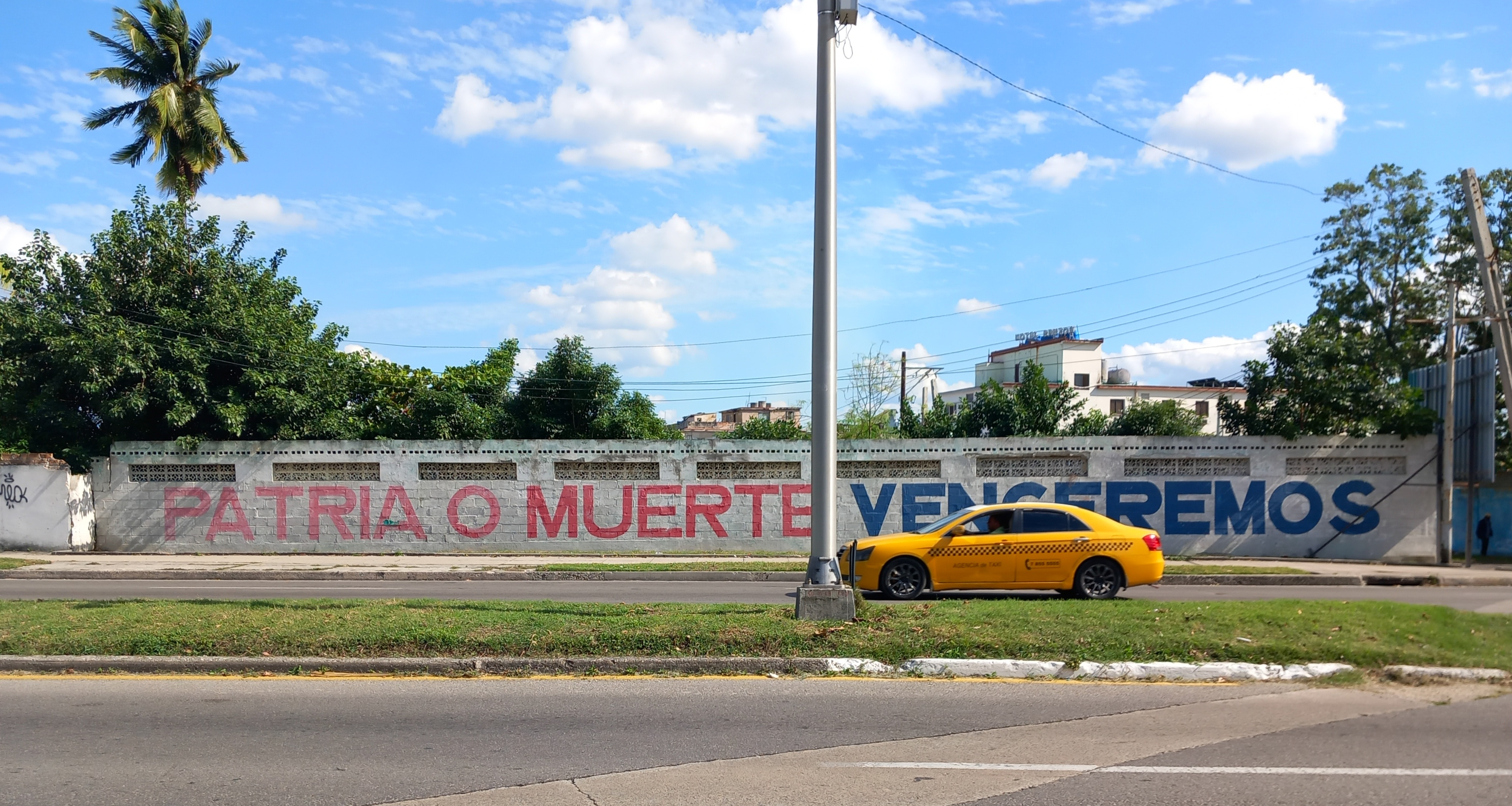
Mural in Havana

Patria o Muerte, Venceremos is an official national motto of Cuba, adopted in 1960.

The origin of the motto was derived from a speech by revolutionary leader Fidel Castro to commemorate the workers and soldiers who died in the La Coubre explosion on March 5, 1960, at the harbour in Havana. The motto was originally written as Patria o Muerte ("Homeland or death"), with the word Venceremos ("we will prevail") added in July 1960 during the Congress of the National Federation of Barber and Hairdressing Workers. In a 1964 speech at the United Nations, Che Guevara used the iconic phrase to communicate Cuba's new stance against the harassment of the U.S. government. The phrase has recently been adapted by some Cuban musicians and protestors to now say, "Patria y vida" ("Homeland and life").

Its French translation is La Patrie ou la Mort, Nous Vaincrons, which is used by Burkina Faso. It was adopted in October 2024 as the national motto after a unanimous vote in the National Assembly. The phrase was also used by the former president of Burkina Faso and revolutionary, Thomas Sankara, and in its national anthem, Ditanyè.

Its Bengali transliteration is Matribhumi Othoba Mrityu (transl. Motherland or Death), and the slogan widely used during the July Uprising in Bangladesh in 2024, which led to the fall of the then ruling authoritarian government, where it gained popularity among Generation Z in Bangladesh. Later, Asif Mahmud, an adviser to Bangladesh's interim government and a student leader after the uprising, wrote a memoir about the July Uprising titled July: Matribhumi Othoba Mrityu.

== See also ==
- Eleftheria i thanatos
- Patria y Vida
- Workers of the world, unite!
