= Color Esperanza =

2002 single by Diego Torres

Single by Diego Torres

from the album Un Mundo Diferente
- Released: November 20, 2001
- Recorded: 2001
- Genre: Latin pop; candombe; world
- Length: 4:27
- Label: Sony Latin
- Songwriters: Cachorro López; Coti Sorokin; Diego Torres
- Producers: Cachorro López; Diego Torres (co-producer)

Diego Torres singles chronology
"Dónde Van" (2000)	"Color Esperanza" (2001)	"Sueños" (2002)

"Color Esperanza" (transl. "Color of Hope") is the lead single from Diego Torres's fifth studio album Un Mundo Diferente.

== Lyrical content and background ==
The song's lyrics reflect on themes of hope and overcoming hard times in life and the song's uplifting beat reflects the lyrical themes. The song was written by Coti Sorokin along with Cachorro López and Spanish journalist Paco García Caridad. The song was performed on MTV Unplugged featuring group La Chilinguita.

== Special performance for the Pope John Paul II ==
In 2003, the song was performed specially by Torres for the Pope John Paul II in Cuatro Vientos Airport in Madrid, Spain by the festival of the Youth, in order to welcome the Pope.

== Music video ==
Diego in the music video.

A music video for the song was directed by Nahuel Lerena and Eduardo Pinto with whom Torres has worked in previous videos.

With a simple plot, the video begins with Torres sleeping in a bed, where he later begins to dream and finds himself in a forest where the landscape is green with a beautiful lake where everything revolves around the song.

The music video was nominated for the video of the year on the MTV Video Music Awards Latinoamérica 2002.

Cover versions

- The song has been covered on several singing talent contests as are La Academia, Objetivo Fama, etc.
- Daniela Romo covered the song for her 2008 album Sueños de Cabaret.
- In 2013 several Spanish female singers covered the song for the project Por ellas, an initiative against breast cancer. Their version of Color esperanza became a number one hit in Spain.

== Charts ==
Chart (2002)	Peak position
U.S. Billboard Hot Latin Songs	48
U.S. Billboard Latin Pop Songs	26
U.S. Billboard Tropical Songs	12
Chart (2008)	Peak position
Spain (PROMUSICAE)	11
Chart (2020)	Peak position
Colombia Pop (Monitor Latino)	5

== Certifications ==
Certifications for "Color Esperanza"
Region	Certification	Certified units/sales
Mexico (AMPROFON)	Diamond+Gold	330,000^{‡}
^{‡} Sales+streaming figures based on certification alone.

== 2020 version ==
"Color Esperanza 2020"

Single by Various artists
- Released: May 18, 2020
- Recorded: 2020
- Length: 3:37
- Label: Sony Latin
- Songwriters: Cachorro López; Coti Sorokin; Diego Torres
- Producer: Yadam Gonzalez

Music video
- "Color Esperanza 2020" on YouTube

On May 18, 2020, Sony Music Latin and Global Citizen joined forces to release a new version of song to benefit the Pan American Health Organization's (PAHO) response to the COVID-19 pandemic. The new version featured several Latin American and Hispanic artists: Lali, Coti and Ángela Torres (Argentina); Thalía, Camila's Mario Domm, Sin Bandera's Leonel García, Reik's Jesús Navarro, Río Roma and Carlos Rivera (Mexico); Camilo, Fonseca, Manuel Turizo, Jorge Villamizar and Carlos Vives (Colombia); Pedro Capó, Farruko, Kany García and Rauw Alejandro (Puerto Rico); Ivete Sangalo and Dilsinho (Brazil); Rubén Blades (Panama); Gente de Zona (Cuba); Mau y Ricky (Venezuela); El Cigala and Dani Martín (Spain); and Leslie Grace, Nicky Jam, Ara Malikian and Prince Royce (USA).

For the 2020 edition of Premios Juventud, the version was nominated for Best Quarantine Song or "The Quarentune", a special category that was created to honor the best songs born during the COVID-19 lockdowns.

Following the success of this version of the song, Peruvian girl group Son Téntacion released a salsa cover featuring all female vocals mostly from Peruvian artists such as Maricarmen Marín and drag queen Chola Chabuca, and also Puerto Rican singer La India.

=== Charts ===
==== Weekly charts ====
Chart (2020)	Peak position
Colombia Pop (Monitor Latino)	11
Dominican Republic Pop (Monitor Latino)	5
Ecuador Pop (Monitor Latino)	13
El Salvador Pop (Monitor Latino)	19
Honduras Pop (Monitor Latino)	4
Nicaragua Pop (Monitor Latino)	5
Panama Pop (Monitor Latino)	11
Paraguay Pop (Monitor Latino)	11
Puerto Rico Pop (Monitor Latino)	14
Uruguay (Monitor Latino)	4
US Latin Pop Airplay (Billboard)	21

==== Year-end charts ====
Chart (2020)	Position
Dominican Republic Pop (Monitor Latino)	34
Honduras Pop (Monitor Latino)	61
Paraguay Pop (Monitor Latino)	68
Panama Pop (Monitor Latino)	83
Puerto Rico Pop (Monitor Latino)	71
Uruguay (Monitor Latino)	52
Uruguay Latin (Monitor Latino)	46

=== Certifications ===
Certifications for "Color Esperanza 2020"
Region	Certification	Certified units/sales
Mexico (AMPROFON)	3× Platinum	180,000^{‡}
Spain (Promusicae)	Platinum	60,000^{‡}
^{‡} Sales+streaming figures based on certification alone.

== See also ==
- List of number-one singles of 2013 (Spain)
