= Tratar de Estar Mejor =

Studio album by Diego Torres
- Released: November 22, 1994
- Recorded: 1993–1994
- Genre: Latin pop
- Label: RCA Records

Diego Torres chronology
| Diego Torres (1992) | Tratar de Estar Mejor (1994) | Luna Nueva (1996) |

Singles from Tratar de Estar Mejor
- 1. "Tratar de Estar Mejor" Released: 1994; 2. "Deja de Pedir Perdón" Released: 1994; 3. "San Salvador" Released: 1995

Tratar de Estar Mejor is the second studio album by Argentine singer-songwriter Diego Torres, it was released on November 22, 1994 through RCA Records.

== Track listing ==
1) Tratar de estar mejor. (Torres/López)

2) Todo cambia (y todo se termina). (Torres/López)

3) Dame una razón. (Torres/López)

4) Aunque quieras. (Torres/López)

5) Deja de pedir perdón. (Torres/López)

6) Te pido que vuelvas. (Torres/López)

7) Pensar (que siempre hay alguien más). (Torres/López)

8) San Salvador. (Torres/López/Tomas)

9) Secretos del mar. (Torres/López)

10) Por la vereda del sol. (Rew)

== Chart performance ==
| Chart (1995) | Peak position |
|---|---|
| Chile (APF) | 1 |

== Certifications and sales ==
| Region | Certification | Certified units/sales |
|---|---|---|
| Argentina (CAPIF) | 6× Platinum | 430,000 |
| Chile | Platinum | |
| Colombia | 2× Platinum | 170,000 |
| Ecuador | Platinum | |
| Paraguay | Platinum | |
| Peru | Platinum | |
| Uruguay (CUD) | Platinum | |

== See also ==
- List of best-selling albums in Colombia
