= Tal Cual Es =

Studio album by Diego Torres
- Released: August 24, 1999
- Recorded: 1998–1999
- Genre: Latin pop
- Length: 55:00
- Label: Sony BMG Latin
- Producer: Cachorro López (executive), Sebastián Schon, Diego Torres (co-producers)

Diego Torres chronology
Luna Nueva (1996)	Tal Cual Es (1999)	Un Mundo Diferente (2001)

Singles from Tal Cual Es
- 1. "La Última Noche" Released: June 21, 1999; 2. "Recuerda" Released: November 8, 1999; 3. "Dónde Van" Released: January 17, 2000; 4. "Que Será" Released: March 6, 2000; 5. "Tal Cual Es" Released: May 1, 2000

Tal Cual Es is the fourth studio album by Argentine singer-songwriter Diego Torres, it was released on August 24, 1999 through Sony BMG Latin.

== Track listing ==
No.	Title	Writer(s)	Length
1.	"Lo Que el Viento Se Llevó"	Alex Batista/Sandra Baylac/Cachorro López/Diego Torres	4:43
2.	"Como Una Ola"	Nelson Motta/Lulú Santos	3:14
3.	"Dónde Van"	Pablo Duchovny/Coti Sorokin/Torres	4:17
4.	"Puede Ser"	Batista/Baylak/Torres	4:10
5.	"Que Será"	Jimmy Fontana/Greco/Francesci Migliacci/C. Pes/Sbriccoli	4:33
6.	"La Última Noche"	Roxana Amed/Baylak/López/Torres	4:36
7.	"Vuelves a Mi"	Baylak/Teddy Fernández/López/Torres	3:44
8.	"Tal Cual Es"	Rolfi Calahorrano/Fernández/López/Torres	4:55
9.	"De Tu Lado"	Baylak/López/Sebastián Schon/Torres	2:59
10.	"Ojos Negros"	Baylak/López/Torres	4:24
11.	"Lluvia de Verano"	López/Schon/Torres	4:29
12.	"Dame Una Señal"	López/Schon/Torres	3:34
13.	"Recuerda" (Bonus Track)	Baylak/Calahorrano/López/Torres	4:33
Total length:			55:00

== Certification ==
Region	Certification	Certified units/sales
Argentina (CAPIF)	Platinum	60,000^{^}
^{^} Shipments figures based on certification alone.
