= A Lo Cubano =

Studio album by Orishas
- Released: October 3, 2000
- Genre: Latin hip hop, alternative hip hop
- Label: Universal Latino

Orishas chronology
A Lo Cubano (2000)	Emigrante (2002)

A Lo Cubano is the debut album by Orishas, a Cuban hip hop group. It was released on October 3, 2000, on the Universal Latino label.

== Critical reception ==
The Independent wrote that "Orishas have managed to produce a truly inspired mix of traditional son and rumba riffs and instrumentation, over which the rap passages mingle with the soulful voice of a sonero."

== Track listing ==
1. "Intro" – 1:57
2. "Represent" – 3:57 (music video directed by J.G Biggs )
3. "Atrevido" – 4:02
4. "A Lo Cubano" – 4:03
5. "Barrio" – 3:54
6. "S.O.L.A.R." – 0:44
7. "1.9.9.9" – 4:10
8. "Atencion" – 4:49
9. "Mistica" – 4:25
10. "Canto Para Elewa Y Chango" – 4:36
11. "Madre" – 4:06
12. "Orishas Llego" – 4:14
13. "537 C.U.B.A." – 4:23
14. "Connexion" – 4:16
15. "Triunfo" – 3:48

== Charts ==
=== Weekly charts ===
Chart (2000)	Peak position
Belgian Albums (Ultratop Flanders)	39
French Albums (SNEP)	40
German Albums (Offizielle Top 100)	67
Italy (IFPI)	40
Spanish Albums (Promusicae)	82
Swiss Albums (Schweizer Hitparade)	22

== Certifications ==
Region	Certification	Certified units/sales
Spain (Promusicae)	Gold	50,000^{^}
^{^} Shipments figures based on certification alone.
