= Diego Torres (singer) =

Argentine singer (born 1971)

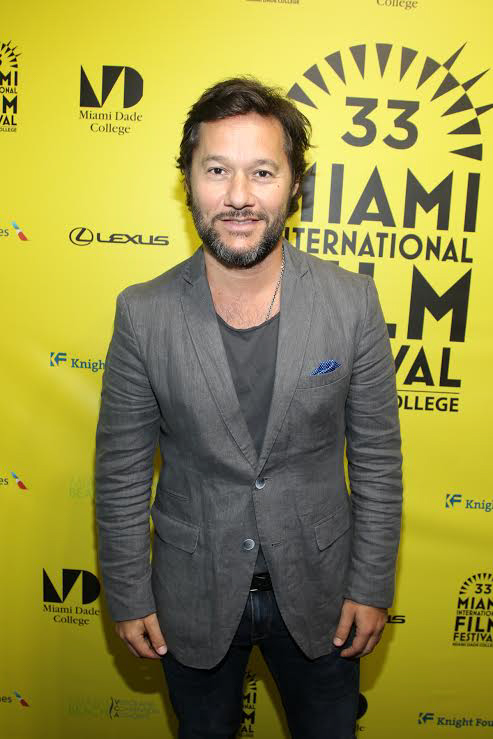
- Torres at the Miami Film Festival, 2016

Background information
- Born: Diego Antonio Caccia; 9 March 1971; Buenos Aires, Argentina
- Genres: Pop; pop rock; reggae; rhumba; flamenco
- Occupations: Singer; musician; actor
- Instruments: Vocals; guitar; piano
- Years active: 1988–present
- Labels: RCA (1993–1996); Sony Music Ariola (1996–2008); Universal Music Latin (2010–2014); Sony Music Latin (2015–present)
- Website: www.diegotorres.com (in Spanish)

Diego Antonio Caccia, known as Diego Torres, (born 9 March 1971) is an Argentine pop singer and actor. His music is generally categorized as Latin pop, tropical, and rock and roll. He is a member of the Latin Songwriters Hall of Fame, and the son of the Argentine icon Lolita Torres.

His work has been well received throughout Latin America and he is a recipient of numerous awards, including the Latin Grammy Award, which he has won three times. His hit single "Color Esperanza," released as an anthem of hope during Argentina's economic depression, has become a standard for school choirs since its release in 2001. He performed it for Pope Francis in 2015.

== Early life ==
He is the son of popular Argentine singer and actress Lolita Torres.

== Career ==
In 1989, Torres' music career began with a band called La Marca. Later, he began his first steps on TV starring in the successful TV series La Banda del Golden Rocket, which stayed on air for three years. He loves soccer. Torres has won 3 awards along with 17 nominations for the Latin Grammys.

In 1992 he launched his first album, Diego Torres, produced by Cachorro López. This album was rewarded 3 times platinum. Two years later, and a little distant from TV, he launched his second album called Tratar de estar mejor which received 5 platinum albums in Argentina and gold and platinum albums in other Latin American countries. This album launched Torres to the international scene.

In 1996 the Italian producer Celso Valli produced Torres' third album, Luna Nueva, and months later Diego started touring with his band all across Latin America, United States, and Spain. The album went on sale, soon reaching gold and quickly being rewarded with the platinum in Argentina.

In 1999 he recorded his fourth album called Tal Cual Es, produced by Cachorro López. This album showed Diego's talent and creativity to compose and mix different Latin sounds, such as flamenco guitars as well as various other tropical sounds.

His next album was named Un Mundo Diferente; it was recorded in the second half of 2001 in Buenos Aires and Miami. This album presents a variety of styles and merges with several Latin rhythm styles in most songs, such as in his most successful song so far, "Color Esperanza", which stayed at the top of the Argentine Singles/Airplay Chart for twelve consecutive weeks. The album received a Grammy Award nomination in 2003.

2004 brought a new challenge to Diego: the possibility of recording an MTV Unplugged, which aired in the MTV networks of Brazil, Latin America, Spain and United States. The reconversion of the acoustics in some of his hits along with the presentation of his new themes were part of this show, which was also produced on CD and DVD.

In 2006 he released his sixth studio album, Andando, proceeded by the lead single "Abriendo Caminos" featuring Dominican singer-songwriter Juan Luis Guerra. In 2005 he received the Platinum Konex Award as best Argentine male pop/ballad singer, shared with Sandro de América.

In 2010 he released his seventh studio album, Distinto, featuring his first the number-one Billboard Hot Latin Song single "Guapa".

== Filmography ==
=== TV ===
- 1989: Nosotros y los otros
- 1991: El gordo y el flaco
- 1991–1993: La Banda del Golden Rocket
- 2011: Los únicos
- 2013: Los Vecinos en Guerra

=== Theater ===
- 1990: Pajáros in the Nait
- 1991: El Zorro
- 1992: La Banda del Golden Rocket

=== Film ===
- 1988: El profesor Punk
- 1994: Una sombra ya pronto serás
- 1997: La furia
- 1999: La venganza
- 2003: El juego de Arcibel
- 2012: Extraños en la noche
- 2015: Papeles en el viento
- 2017: Casi leyendas
- 2018: Re loca

== Discography ==
=== Studio albums ===
- 1992: Diego Torres
- 1994: Tratar de Estar Mejor
- 1996: Luna Nueva
- 1999: Tal Cual Es
- 2001: Un Mundo Diferente
- 2006: Andando
- 2010: Distinto
- 2015: Buena Vida
- 2021: Atlántico a Pie
- 2024: Mejor Que Ayer
- 2025: Mi Norte & Mi Sur

=== Live albums ===
- 2004: MTV Unplugged
- 2020: Diego Torres Sinfónico

=== Compilation albums ===
- 2008: Un Cachito de Mí: Grandes Éxitos
- 2008: Todos Éxitos

=== Other albums ===
- 1991: Compañías Indias (with his former group La Marca)

== Awards ==
=== Nominations ===
- 2013 Martín Fierro Awards
  - Best actor of daily comedy (for Los vecinos en guerra)

== See also ==
- List of best-selling Latin music artists
- List of singer-songwriters
