= En Primera Fila =

Live album by Franco De Vita
- Released: May 31, 2011
- Recorded: January 20 – 21, 2011 at Comtel Studios in Miami, Florida, United States
- Genre: Latin pop
- Length: 79:36
- Language: Spanish
- Label: Sony
- Producer: David Cabrera, Franco De Vita

Franco De Vita chronology
Simplemente La Verdad (2008)	En Primera Fila (2011)	Vuelve en Primera Fila (2013)

Singles from En Primera Fila
- 1. "Tan Sólo Tú" Released: March 2011; 2. "Si Quieres Decir Adiós" Released: October 24, 2011

En Primera Fila (Front Row) is the third live album by Venezuelan recording artist Franco De Vita. It was released by Sony Music on May 31, 2011, after a three-year gap since the release of De Vita's last studio album. De Vita worked as producer with David Cabrera. The album is part of the live albums series entitled Primera Fila, promoted by the record label and including De Vita's greatest hits on re-worked versions and new songs.

The album features collaborations by several performers, including Leonel García, Alejandra Guzmán, Debi Nova, Gilberto Santa Rosa, and Noel Schajris, among others. En Primera Fila entered the top five in Mexico and the United States. The first single, "Tan Sólo Tú", performed by De Vita and Guzmán, reached Top 20 at the Billboard Top Latin Songs. Francamente, a DVD documentary about the recording sessions, is included on the standard edition of the album. De Vita was awarded the Best Male Pop Vocal Album at the 12th Latin Grammy Awards for En Primera Fila.

== Background ==
After selling 12 million copies of his albums and composing for various artists, including Ricky Martin and Chayanne, Franco De Vita recorded En Primera Fila as a part of the concert series promoted by the label Sony Music entitled Primera Fila, which has a concept of record live performances by Latin American performers before a small audience in an intimate setting, resemblant to MTV Unplugged. About Primera Fila De Vita said, "The project was good for me, since I wanted to refresh many songs, some of them composed and recorded 25 years ago to incorporate a current sound and change some things. But the songs remains the same." De Vita became the fourth performer to record under this format, following Vicente Fernández, Thalía, and OV7. The album is De Vita's third live album, following En Vivo Marzo 16 (1992) and Mil y Una Historias en Vivo (2006).

== Development ==
Franco De Vita "Tan Sólo Tú" (2011)
A sample of the lead single, "Tan Solo Tú", which features Alejandra Guzman. The song was recorded twice according to De Vita, due to the song being the most complicated.

En Primera Fila was recorded from January 20–21, 2011, at the Comtel Studios in Miami, Florida, United States. De Vita was supported by a band of 15 members and was joined on stage by a handful of guest performers. Colombian singer-songwriter Santiago Cruz helped with the song "Cálido y Frío", Gilberto Santa Rosa added vocals to "Te Veo Venir Soledad", Soledad Pastorutti performed on "No Se Olvida", Alejandra Guzmán on "Tan Sólo Tú", and Debi Nova on "Si Quieres Decir Adiós". For the track "Si La Ves", De Vita was accompanied by the members of the dissolved band Sin Bandera, Leonel García and Noel Schajris, who performed on the original version of the song. "I tried to give to the songs a different look, dress them differently. I did not change the lyrics or the melody, only the instrumental part," De Vita recalled about the recording session. According to De Vita, Guzmán had the most complicated song on the album, the lead single. De Vita and Guzmán recorded the track twice, with Guzmán standing beside De Vita's piano. For "Te Veo Venir Soledad", De Vita and Santa Rosa tried to play a guajira, in order to Santa Rosa to improvise. The singer tried to keep the musical arrangements fresh and modern, without changing the songs too much. "I did not wanted people to feel that the songs were changed," De Vita declared.

== Repertoire ==
About the songs to be included on the album, De Vita revealed that his idea was to include well-known songs that were more than three years old and refresh them with new arrangements. "The first challenge was to choose the songs, and the second to make that sound different... but not too much", De Vita said. Sixteen previous songs by the singer are included: "Un Buen Perdedor", from his debut album of 1984; and "Aquí Estás Otra Vez", from Fantasía (1986); "Louis" and "Te Amo", from Al Norte del Sur (1989); "No Basta", the lead single from Extranjero (1990); "Y Te Pienso" and "Cálido y Frío", from Voces a mi Alrededor (1993); "Si Quieres Decir Adios" and the title track from the 1993 album Fuera de Este Mundo; and "Si Tú No Estás" and "Te Veo Venir Soledad", selected from Nada es Igual (1999). The most represented album on the setlist is Stop (2005) with four songs: "Si La Ves", "Dónde Está el Amor", "No Me Lástimes", and "Tú de Qué Vas". "No Se Olvida" is the only song selected from the 2008 album Simplemente La Verdad. Two songs were previously unreleased. De Vita chose Mexican singer Alejandra Guzmán to record the lead single "Tan Sólo Tú", since he thought she was "perfect" for the song. "Mira Más Allá" is the other new song included. De Vita also stated his intention to record a sequel to Primera Fila; since many songs in his repertoire were left out, "I would like to include Shakira on a ballad... Ricky Martin was considered for this album too, but could not make it in time." Two years later, Vuelve en Primera Fila was announced to be the follow-up album which was released on November 12, 2013, in Latin America.

== Reception ==
=== Critical reception ===
Professional ratings
Review scores
Source	Rating
Allmusic	3.5/5 stars

Mariano Prunes of Allmusic gave the album 3.5 out of 5 stars. He described it as an opportunity to showcase De Vita's craftsmanship, while the singer "effortlessly dabble in pop, rock, ballads, and salsa." De Vita earned two Latin Grammy Awards for his work on En Primera Fila: Best Male Pop Vocal Album and Best Long Form Music Video for the recording of the live presentation, which was shared with Diego Alvarez and Vicente Solís; while the album was nominated for Album of the Year, which it lost to Entren Los Que Quieran by Calle 13. The first single, "Tan Sólo Tú" received nominations for Record of the Year and Best Short Form Music Video, losing the first to "Latinoamérica", and the second to "Calma Pueblo", both by Calle 13. The album also received a nomination for the Mexican Oye! Awards for Male Pop Album of the Year, while "Tan Sólo Tú" was nominated for Pop Song of the Year. De Vita lost the first award to Cristian Castro for Viva el Príncipe, and the second to Mexican band Zoé for "Labios Rotos".

=== Commercial reception ===
The album debuted at number four and peaked at number two on the Mexican Albums Chart. En Primera Fila earned a double platinum certification in Mexico by the Asociación Mexicana de Productores de Fonogramas y Videogramas. In the United States, the album debuted and peaked at number three in the Billboard Latin Albums, becoming De Vita's second top ten album and highest placement on the chart, after Stop peaked at number seven in 2005. On the Latin Pop Albums chart, En Primera Fila was the first number-one album for De Vita and his seventh top ten hit. The album was certified Gold (Latin field) by the Recording Industry Association of America.

== Promotion ==
=== Singles ===
"Tan Sólo Tú", performed by De Vita and Alejandra Guzmán, was selected as the lead single from the album and also as the main theme for the Argentinian series Los únicos. De Vita also recorded a cameo for the series. The track peaked at number 15 in the Billboard Latin Songs and at number three in the Latin Pop Songs charts in the United States. In Mexico, the song peaked at number four on the Mexican Singles Chart. "Si Quieres Decir Adiós" was released as the second single. The song features singer-songwriter Debi Nova and peaked at number 26 in the Latin Pop Songs chart in the United States.

=== Tour ===
To promote En Primera Fila, De Vita launched the "Mira Más Allá Tour", where he had scheduled performances in Ecuador (Guayaquil and Quito); Venezuela (Puerto La Cruz, Valencia, Caracas, Maracaibo and San Cristóbal); for the show held in Caracas at the Generalissimo Francisco de Miranda Air Base De Vita was joined by Panamanian singer-songwriter Rubén Blades and the Simón Bolivar Symphony and they gathered more than 100,000 people; De Vita also visited Mexico (Guadalajara, Puebla, Tijuana), with the presentation in Guadalajara, held at the Telmex Auditorium, being joined by Leonel García on the song "Si la Ves", and also performing "Entra en Mi Vida", a single from García's former band Sin Bandera. In the United States the singer performed at the Radio City Music Hall and was accompanied by Spanish singer Natalia Jiménez, Leonel García and La India. Following this presentation De Vita visited Boston and Washington to finally arrive to Argentina to perform at the Gran Rex. De Vita also performed along Alejandra Guzmán at the 12th Latin Grammy Awards the single "Tan Sólo Tú".

== Track listing ==
All tracks are written by Franco De Vita (except where noted).

No.	Title	Length
1.	"Dónde Está el Amor"	5:47
2.	"Louis"	4:43
3.	"Fuera de Este Mundo"	4:35
4.	"Si Quieres Decir Adiós" (featuring Debi Nova)	4:31
5.	"Si Tú No Estás"	4:22
6.	"No Me Lastimes"	4:07
7.	"Cálido y Frío" (featuring Santiago Cruz)	3:34
8.	"Tú De Qué Vas"	4:25
9.	"Tan Sólo Tú" (featuring Alejandra Guzmán)	3:57
10.	"Y Te Pienso"	3:36
11.	"Mira Más Allá (written by David Cabrera, Franco De Vita)"	3:35
12.	"Si La Ves" (featuring Noel Schajris and Leonel García)	4:14
13.	"Un Buen Perdedor"	3:54
14.	"Aquí Estás Otra Vez"	3:21
15.	"No Se Olvida" (featuring Soledad)	4:06
16.	"Te Amo"	3:38
17.	"Te Veo Venir Soledad" (featuring Gilberto Santa Rosa)	7:15
18.	"No Basta"	5:56

All tracks are written by Franco De Vita (except where noted).

En Primera Fila y Más
No.	Title	Length
19.	"Tan Sólo Tú" (featuring Natalia Jiménez)	3:57
20.	"Si Tú No Estás" (featuring Amaia Montero)	4:25
21.	"Mi Sueño"	3:39

== Personnel ==
This information adapted from Allmusic.

- David Cabrera – arranger, composer, backing vocals
- Lina Cáceres – viola
- Waldy D – mastering
- Isabel De Jesús – A&R
- Franco De Vita – arranger, composer, lyricist, main performer
- Manuel Diquez – arranger, vocals
- Tony Escapa – arranger, drums
- Jorge Fonseca – A&R
- Paul Forat – A&R
- Karina Iglesias – vocals
- Phil McArthur – arranger
- Jackie Mendez – vocals
- Debi Nova – arranger, vocals
- Héctor Tovar – A&R
- Elizabeth Vásquez – cello
- Americo Baptista – cuatro
- Saúl Vera – bandola
- Federico Vindver – keyboards, arranger
- Gabriel Saientz – keyboards, accordion

== Charts and certifications ==
=== Charts ===
Chart (2011)	Peak position
Argentine Albums (CAPIF)	1
Mexican Albums (AMPROFON)	2
US Billboard 200	140
US Top Latin Albums (Billboard)	3
US Latin Pop Albums (Billboard)	1

=== Year-end charts ===
Chart (2011)	Position
Argentine Albums (CAPIF)	7
Mexican Albums (AMPROFON)	9
US Top Latin Albums (Billboard)	33
US Latin Pop Albums (Billboard)	12

Chart (2012)	Position
Mexican Albums (AMPROFON)	59
US Top Latin Albums (Billboard)	63

=== Album certifications ===
Region	Certification	Certified units/sales
Argentina (CAPIF)	Platinum	40,000^{^}
Mexico (AMPROFON)	4× Platinum+Gold	270,000^{‡}
United States (RIAA)	Gold (Latin)	50,000^{^}
Venezuela (AVINPRO)	4× Platinum	30,000
^{^} Shipments figures based on certification alone.^{‡} Sales+streaming figures based on certification alone.

== See also ==
- 2011 in Latin music
- List of number-one Billboard Latin Pop Albums from the 2010s
