= 12th Annual Latin Grammy Awards =

Music awards presented Nov 2011

12th Latin Grammy Awards
- Date: November 10, 2011
- Venue: Mandalay Bay Events Center, Paradise, Nevada
- Hosted by: Lucero and Cristián de la Fuente

Highlights
- Person of the Year: Shakira

Television/radio coverage
- Network: Univision

The 12th Annual Latin Grammy Awards was held on Thursday, November 10, 2011, at the Mandalay Bay Events Center in Las Vegas and was hosted by Lucero and Cristián de la Fuente. The eligibility period for recordings to be nominated is July 1, 2010 to June 30, 2011. The show was aired on Univision.

Puerto Rican band Calle 13 were the big winners of the night with nine awards (breaking the previous record of five wins in a single ceremony) including Album of the Year for Entren Los Que Quieran; and Record of the Year and Song of the Year for "Latinoamérica". The Best New Artist award went to Sie7e. Shakira was honored as the Person of the Year the night before the telecast and she also won the award for Best Female Pop Vocal Album for Sale El Sol.

== Awards ==
Winners are in bold text.

=== General ===
Record of the Year

Calle 13 featuring Totó la Momposina, Susana Baca and Maria Rita – "Latinoamérica"

- Franco De Vita and Alejandra Guzmán – "Tan Sólo Tú"
- Luis Fonsi – "Gritar"
- Los Tigres del Norte featuring Paulina Rubio – "Golpes en el Corazón"
- Ricky Martin featuring Natalia Jiménez – "Lo Mejor de Mi Vida Eres Tú"

Album of the Year

Calle 13 – Entren Los Que Quieran

- Alex, Jorge y Lena – Alex, Jorge y Lena
- Franco De Vita – En Primera Fila
- Enrique Iglesias – Euphoria
- Shakira – Sale el Sol

Song of the Year

Rafa Arcaute and Calle 13 – "Latinoamérica" (Calle 13 featuring Totó la Momposina, Susana Baca and Maria Rita)

- Marco Antonio Solís – "A Dónde Vamos a Parar"
- Jorge Drexler – "Que El Soneto Nos Tome Por Sorpresa"
- Pablo Alborán – "Solamente Tú"
- Eric Bazilian, Claudia Brant, Andreas Carlsson, Desmond Child and Ricky Martin – "Lo Mejor de Mi Vida Eres Tú" (Ricky Martin featuring Natalia Jiménez)

Best New Artist

Sie7e

- Pablo Alborán
- Max Capote
- Paula Fernandes
- Il Volo

=== Pop ===
Best Female Pop Vocal Album

Shakira – Sale el Sol

- Claudia Brant – Manuscrito
- Myriam Hernández – Seducción
- Malú – Guerra Fría
- Merche – Acordes de Mi Diario

Best Male Pop Vocal Album

Franco De Vita – En Primera Fila

- Pablo Alborán – Pablo Alborán
- Reyli – Bien Acompañado
- Cristian Castro – Viva el príncipe
- Marco Antonio Solís – En Total Plenitud

Best Pop Album by a Duo/Group with Vocals

Alex, Jorge y Lena – Alex, Jorge y Lena

- Belanova – Sueño Electro I
- Il Volo – Edición En Español
- Río Roma – Al Fin Te Encontré
- Siam – Siam

=== Urban ===
Best Urban Music Album

Calle 13 – Entren Los Que Quieran

- Don Omar – Don Omar Presents: Meet the Orphans
- Pitbull – Armando
- Ivy Queen – Drama Queen
- Wisin & Yandel – Los Vaqueros: El Regreso

Best Urban Song

Rafa Arcaute and Calle 13 – "Baile de los Pobres" (Calle 13)

- Renato Carosone, Mathew Handley, Duncan Maclennas, Nicola Salerno, Andrew Stanley and Pitbull – "Bon, Bon" (Pitbull)
- Don Omar and Lucenzo – "Danza Kuduro"
- Wisin & Yandel – "Estoy Enamorado"
- Daddy Yankee and Prince Royce – "Ven Conmigo"

=== Rock ===
Best Rock Album

Maná – Drama y Luz

- Don Tetto – Mienteme – Prometeme
- Saúl Hernández – Remando
- Jarabe de Palo – ¿Y Ahora Qué Hacemos?
- La Vida Bohème – Nuestra
- No Te Va Gustar – Por Lo Menos Hoy

Best Rock Song

León Larregui and Zoé – "Labios Rotos" (Zoé)

- Marcelo Corvalan, Hernan Terry Langer & Andres Vilanova – "Ácido" (Carajo)
- Emiliano Brancciari – "Chau" (No Te Va Gustar)
- Gustávo Napoli – "Poder" (La Renga)
- La Vida Bohème – "Radio Capital"

=== Alternative ===
Best Alternative Music Album

Zoé – MTV Unplugged/Música de Fondo

- Doctor Krápula – Corazón Bombea/Vivo
- Fidel Nadal – Forever Together
- Carla Morrison – Mientras Tu Dormias
- Mr. Pauer – Soundtrack

Best Alternative Song

Rafa Arcaute and Calle 13 – "Calma Pueblo" (Calle 13 featuring Omar-Rodríguez-López)

- San Pascualito Reyes – "Salgamos de Aquí"
- Doctor Krápula – "Somos"
- DJ Blass and Fidel Nadal – "Te Robaste Mi Corazón" (Fidel Nadal)
- Sie7e – "Tengo Tu Love"

=== Tropical ===
Best Salsa Album

Rubén Blades and Seis Del Solar – Todos Vuelven Live

- José Alberto "El Canario" – Original
- Edwin Bonilla – Homenaje A Los Rumberos
- Spanish Harlem Orchestra – Viva La Tradición
- Various Artists – Salsa: Un Homenaje A El Gran Combo

Best Cumbia/Vallenato Album

Juan Carlos Coronel — Tesoros

- Silvestre Dangond & Juancho De La Espriella – Cantinero
- El Binomio de Oro – Corazón de Miel
- Peter Manjarrés & Sergio Luis Rodríguez – Tu Número Uno
- Felipe Peláez – De Otras Manera
- Iván Villazón and Iván Zuleta – Dando Lidia

Best Contemporary Tropical Album

Tito El Bambino – El Patrón: Invencible

- Héctor Acosta – Obligame
- Monchy & Nathalia – Monchy & Nathalia
- Daniel Santacruz – Bachata Stereo
- Paula Zuleta – Mezcla Soy

Best Traditional Tropical Album

Cachao López – The Last Mambo

- Albita – Toda Una Vida (Cuban Masterworks)
- Adalberto Álvarez – El Son de Altura
- Esencia – Con La Fuerza de un Tren
- Septeto Santiaguero – Oye Mi Son Santiaguero

Best Tropical Song

Calle 13 – "Vamo' A Portarnos Mal"

- Juan Magan – "Bailando Por Ahí"
- Alex Bandana, Gloria Estrada & La Marisoul – "La Negra" (La Santa Cecilia)
- Rafi Monclova and Gilberto Santa Rosa – "Me Cambiaron Las Preguntas" (Gilberto Santa Rosa)
- Yoel Henríquez – "Me Duele la Cabeza"

=== Singer-Songwriter ===
Best Singer-Songwriter Album

Amaury Gutiérrez – Sesiones Intimas
Gian Marco – Días Nuevos

- Ricardo Arjona – Poquita Ropa
- Carlinhos Brown – Diminuto
- Alberto Cortez – Tener En Cuenta

=== Regional Mexican ===
Best Ranchero Album

Vicente Fernández – El Hombre Que Mas Te Amó

- Pepe Aguilar – Bicentenario 1810 / 1910 / 2010
- Lucía Méndez – Canta Un Homenaje A Juan Gabriel
- Paquita la del Barrio – Eres Un Farsante
- Joan Sebastián – Huevos Rancheros

Best Banda Album

La Arrolladora Banda El Limón – Todo Depende De Tí

- Banda Los Recoditos – A Toda Madre
- Banda Machos – 20 Años de Éxitos en Vivo
- El Guero Y Su Banda Centenario – Estaré Mejor
- Espinoza Paz – Del Rancho Para El Mundo
- Jenni Rivera – La Gran Señora en Vivo

Best Tejano Album

Little Joe & La Familia – Recuerdos

- Chente Barrera – El Número Siete
- Joe Posada – In The Pocket
- Sunny Sauceda y Todo Eso – Camaleón
- Tortilla Factory – Cookin'

Best Norteño Album

Los Tigres del Norte – MTV Unplugged: Los Tigres del Norte and Friends

- Intocable – Intocable 2000
- Los Huracanes del Norte – Soy Mexicano
- Los Tucanes de Tijuana – Árbol
- Pesado – Desde La Cantina, Volumen II

Best Regional Song

Marco Antonio Solís – "Tú Me Vuelves Loco"

- Marco Antonio Solís – "A Dónde Vamos a Parar"
- Mario Quintero Lara – "El Jefe de la Sierra" (Los Tucanes de Tijuana)
- Joan Sebastián – "El Padrino"
- Joan Sebastián – "Huevos Rancheros"

=== Instrumental ===
Best Instrumental Album

Chick Corea, Stanley Clarke and Lenny White – Forever

- Al Di Meloa – Pursuit of Radical Rhapsody
- Escalandrum – Piazzolla Plays Piazzolla
- Luis Salinas – Sin Tiempo
- Omar Sosa – Calma

=== Traditional ===
Best Folk Album

Mercedes Sosa – Deja La Vida Volar – En Gira

- Eva Ayllón & Perú Negro – 40 Años de Clasicos Afro Peruanos
- Jorge Pardo – Música Tradicional Peruana Homenaje A Arturo Zambo Cavero Y Oscar Aviles
- Soledad Pastorutti – Vivo En Arequito
- Santoral – Más Que Enamorao

Best Tango Album

Diego El Cigala – Cigala & Tango

- Leopoldo Federico and El Arranque – Raras Partituras 6
- Orquesta del Tango de la Ciudad de Buenos Aires and Susana Rinaldi – En Vivo – Homenaje A Cátulo Castillo & Anibal Troilo
- Orquesta del Tango de la Ciudad de Buenos Aires – 30 Años
- Susana Rinaldi and Leopoldo Federico – Vos y Yo

Best Flamenco Album

Niña Pastori – La Orilla de mi Pelo

- Josemi Carmona – Las Pequeñas Cosas
- Chano Domínguez – Piano Ibérico
- Ojos de Brujo – 10 Años – Corriente Vital
- Pastora Soler – 15 Años

=== Jazz ===
Best Latin Jazz Album Paquito D'Rivera – Panamericana Suite

- Paquito D'Rivera and Pepe Rivero – Clazz: Continental Latin Jazz. Live At Barcelona, Teatre Paral.lel 2011
- Bobby Sanabria conducting The Manhattan School of Music Afro-Cuban Jazz Orchestra – Tito Puente Masterworks Live!!!
- Chucho Valdés – New York Is Now! / Viva El Sonido Cubano
- Dave Valentin – Pure Imagination

=== Christian ===
Best Christian Album (Spanish Language)

Alex Campos – Lenguaje de Amor

- Moisés Angulo – Alégrense!
- Marco Barrientos – Transformados
- Funky – Reset
- Ingrid Rosario – Cuan Gran Amor
- Tercer Cielo – Viaje a las estrellas

Best Christian Album (Portuguese Language)

Aline Barros – Extraordinário Amor De Deus

- Ministério Adoração e Vida – Em Santidade
- Rosa de Saron – Horizonte Vivo Distante
- Various Artists – Uma História Em Canções
- Pe. Zezinho, scj – Quando Deus Se Calou

=== Brazilian ===
Best Brazilian Contemporary Pop Album

Jota Quest – Quinze

- Arnaldo Antunes – Ao Vivo Lá em Casa
- Vanessa da Mata – Bicicletas, Bolos e Outras Alegrias
- Os Paralamas do Sucesso – Multishow ao Vivo Paralamas Brasil Afora
- Ivete Sangalo – Multishow ao Vivo: Ivete Sangalo no Madison Square Garden
- Seu Jorge e Almaz – Seu Jorge e Almaz

Best Brazilian Rock Album

Caetano Veloso – Zii e Zie – Ao Vivo

- Fresno – Revanche
- Os Mutantes – Haih Or Amortecedor
- Pitty – A Trupe Delirante no Circo Voador
- Plebe Rude – Rachando Concreto ao Vivo em Brasília

Best Samba/Pagode Album

Exaltasamba – Exaltasamba 25 Anos – Ao Vivo

- Martinho da Vila – Filosofia de Vida
- Fundo de Quintal – Nossa Verdade
- Diogo Nogueira – Sou Eu – Ao Vivo
- Zeca Pagodinho – Vida da Minha Vida

Best MPB Album

Djavan – Ária

- Milton Nascimento – E a Gente Sonhando
- Mônica Salmaso – Alma Lírica Brasileira
- Caetano Veloso and Maria Gadú – Multishow ao Vivo Caetano e Maria Gadú
- Yeahwon – Yeahwon

Best Sertaneja Music Album

João Bosco & Vinícius – João Bosco & Vinícius

- Paula Fernandes – Ao Vivo
- Leonardo – Alucinação
- Roberta Miranda – Sorrir Faz a Vida Valer
- Michel Teló – Ao Vivo

Best Native Brazilian Roots Album

Naná Vasconcelos – Sinfonia & Batuques

- Geraldo Azevedo – Salve São Francisco
- Gilberto Gil – Fé na Festa ao Vivo
- Paulo César Pinheiro – Capoeira de Besouro
- Elba Ramalho – Marco Zero ao Vivo

Best Brazilian Song

Nando Reis and Samuel Rosa – "De Repente" (Skank)

- Gigi, Dan Kambaiah, Fabinho O'Brian and Magno Sant'Anna – "Acelera Aê (Noite do Bem)" (Ivete Sangalo)
- Ná Ozzetti and Luiz Tatit – "Equilíbrio" (Ná Ozzetti)
- Adriana Calcanhotto – "Mais Perfumado"
- Eliane Elias – "What About the Heart (Bate Bate)"

=== Children's ===
Best Latin Children's Album

Pato Fu – Música de Brinquedo

- Claraluna – Un Mundo de Navidad
- Piero – Sinfonia Inconclusa En 'L'a Mar
- Omara Portuondo – Reír y Cantar
- Jessyca Sarango – Henry El Camioncito Verde
- Topa & Muni – La Casa de Playhouse Disney
- Various Artists – Cantando Aprendo A Hablar: Vamos A Jugar

=== Classical ===
Best Classical Album

Brazilian Guitar Quartet – Brazilian Guitar Quartet Plays Villa-Lobos

- Adonis González – Adios A Cuba
- Clara Sverner – Chopin
- Francis Hime, Nelson Ayres, OSESP, Fabio Zanon – Concertino Para Percussão" & "Concerto Para Violão
- José Serebrier – José Serebrier: Sinfonia No. 1
- Manuel Barrueco – Tárrega!
- Villa-Lobos Trio – Villa-Lobos Trio Play: Heitor Villa-Lobos, Astor Piazzolla & Lucio Bruno-Videla

Best Classical Contemporary Composition

Paquito D'Rivera – "Panamericana Suite" (Paquito D'Rivera)

- Javier Álvarez – "Le Repas Du Serpent" (Iracema de Andrade)
- Orlando Jacinto García – "Mixtura" (Iracema de Andrade)
- Lalo Schifrin – "Romerías" (Sergio Puccini)
- Sergio Roberto de Oliveira – "Umas Coisas do Coração (i- Agitado)" (Armildo Uzeda)

=== Recording Package ===
Best Recording Package

Javier Mariscal – Chico & Rita (Various Artists)
Alejandro Ros – Solo un Momento (Vicentico)

- Natalia Ayala, Carlos Dussan Gomez and Juliana Jaramillo – El Corazón y El Sombrero (Marta Gómez)
- Juan Gatti – El Paso Trascendental del Vodevil a la Astracanada (Fangoria)
- Allan Castañeda and Sandra Masías – Fiesta Inkaterra (Miki González)

=== Production ===
Best Engineered Album

Benny Faccone, Thom Russo and Tom Baker – Drama y Luz (Maná)

- Rafo Arbulú, Carlos Castro, Humberto Gatica, Guillermo 'Memo' Gil, Allan Leschhorn, Cristian Robles, Andrés Saavedra, Rodolfo Vázquez and Bernie Grundman – Días Nuevos (Gian Marco)
- Valter Costa, Beto Neves, Flávio Sena, Alê Siqueira, Flávio Souza, William Jr and Carlos Freitas – Diminuto (Carlinhos Brown)
- Ricky Campanelli and Juan Cristóbal Losada – Homenaje a Los Rumberos (Edwin Bonilla)
- Moogie Canazio, Brad Haenel and Ron Mc Master – Manuscrito (Claudia Brant)

Producer of the Year

Rafael Arcaute and Calle 13

- Aureo Baqueiro
- Desmond Child
- Isidro Infante
- Gustavo Santaolalla

=== Music video ===
Best Short Form Music Video

Calle 13 – "Calma Pueblo"

- Alexander Acha – "Amiga"
- Franco De Vita featuring Alejandra Guzmán – "Tan Sólo Tú"
- Maná – "Lluvia al Corazón"
- Ricky Martin – "Lo Mejor de Mi Vida Eres Tú"
- Shakira – "Loca"

Best Long Form Music Video

Franco De Vita – En Primera Fila

- Huáscar Barradas – Entre Amigos 2 En Vivo
- Rubén Blades and Seis del Solar – Todos Vuelven Live DVD Vol. 1 & Vol. 2
- Maná – Drama y Luz
- Alejandro Sanz – Canciones Para Un Paraíso: En Vivo
- Zoé – MTV Unplugged/Música de Fondo

=== Special awards ===
Lifetime Achievement Award

- Joe Arroyo
- Gal Costa
- José Feliciano
- Alex Lora
- Les Luthiers
- Rubén Rada
- Linda Ronstadt

Trustees Award

- Manuel Alejandro
- Jesús "Chucho" Ferrer
- Ray Santos

Person of the Year

- Shakira

== Performers ==
- 01. Intro — "Latin Grammy 2011" 00:45
- 02. Calle 13, Gustavo Dudamel And Orquesta Sinfónica Simón Bolívar — "Latinoamérica " 06:30
- 03. Shakira — "Antes De Las Seis" 02:50
- 04. Los Tigres Del Norte Featuring Paulina Rubio — "Golpes En El Corazón" 03:40
- 05. Maná Featuring Prince Royce — "Lluvia al Corazón / El Verdadero Amor Perdona" 06:08
- 06. Franco De Vita Featuring Alejandra Guzmán — "Tan Sólo Tú" 03:41
- 07. Wisin & Yandel And Sean Kingston — "Estoy Enamorado / Fever" 05:16
- 08. Marco Antonio Solís — "A Dónde Vamos a Parar" 03:36
- 09. Shakira — "Devoción / Loca" 05:53
- 10. Paula Fernandes And Romeo — "Meu Eu Em Você" 02:23
- 11. Pablo Alborán Featuring Demi Lovato — "Solamente Tú" 02:34
- 12. Sie7e Featuring Taboo — "Tengo Tu Love" 02:41
- 13. Cristian Castro — "El Triste" 03:30
- 14. Pepe Aguilar — "Canción mexicana" 03:03
- 15. Pitbull Featuring Marc Anthony — "Vida 23 / Rain Over Me" 03:49
- 16. Romeo Featuring Usher — "Promise" 04:19
- 17. Alex, Jorge y Lena — "La Canción Del Pescado"
- 18. Intocable — "Prometí"
- 19. Reyli And Pepe Aguilar — "Al Fín Me Arme De Valor"

== Presenters ==
- Lucero, Zoe Saldaña and Sofía Vergara – introduced the show
- Angelique Boyer – presented Best Regional Song
- Saúl Hernández and Blanca Soto – presented Best New Artist
- Chiquinquira Delgado and Juan Manuel Marquez – presented Best Urban Music Album
- Banda Los Recoditos and Natalia Jiménez – presented Best Contemporary Tropical Album
- Sandra Echeverría and Erik Estrada – presented Best Pop Album by a Duo/Group with Vocals
- Sofía Vergara – presented Person of the Year
- Héctor Acosta and Myriam Hernández – presented Best Urban Song
- Adrienne Bailon and Tito El Bambino – presented Best Rock Album
- Zoe Saldaña – presented Record of the Year
- Denisse Guerrero and Prince Royce – presented Best Male Pop Vocal Album
- Silvia Navarro – presented Best Norteño Album
- David Zepeda – presented Song of the Year
- Lucero and Kermit the Frog – introduced Intocable
- Sebastián Rulli – presented Best Female Pop Vocal Album
- Paulina Rubio and Gustavo Dudamel – presented Album of the Year
