= Lo Nuestro Award for Pop New Artist of the Year =

Latin music award

- Awarded for: Pop New Artist of the Year
- Country: United States
- Presented by: Univision
- First award: 1989
- Final award: 2014
- Website: univision.com/premiolonuestro

The Lo Nuestro Award for Pop New Artist of the Year is an honor presented annually by American television network Univision. It was first awarded in 1989 and has been given annually since to recognize the most talented performers of Latin music. The nominees and winners were originally selected by a voting poll conducted among program directors of Spanish-language radio stations in the United States and also based on chart performance on Billboard Latin music charts, with the results being tabulated and certified by the accounting firm Deloitte. At the present time, the winners are selected by the audience through an online survey. The trophy awarded is shaped in the form of a treble clef.

The award was first presented to French group Gipsy Kings. Kaoma won the following year, aided by their hit song "Lambada" which sold five-million units worldwide. American performer Christina Aguilera won both the Grammy Award for Best New Artist in 2000 and the Lo Nuestro for Pop New Artist the following year. Spanish singer David Bisbal, winner in 2004, is the only performer also being awarded the Latin Grammy Award for Best New Artist; while 2008 nominee Alexander Acha also earned New Artist accolade at the 10th Latin Grammy Awards. Singer-songwriters Lena Burke, Alexandre Pires and Álex Ubago were nominated for New Artist of the Year as a solo performers and as the group Alex, Jorge y Lena and Só Pra Contrariar, respectively, losing on both instances. Enrique Iglesias, Jon Secada and Shakira won for Best New Artist at the Lo Nuestro Awards and also earned the Grammy Award for Best Latin Pop Album.

American singer Jennifer Lopez and Canadian performer Nelly Furtado were previously nominees for a Lo Nuestro Award before being awarded. Lopez was up for Pop Female Artist of the Year in 2000, while Furtado was a nominee for Pop Group or Duo of the Year along Colombian singer-songwriter Juanes at the 2004 ceremony. Mexican actress Eiza González won in 2009 for her singing role in the TV series Lola...Érase una vez. Spanish singer Natalia Jimenez was previously awarded the Lo Nuestro Award for Pop Album of the Year as a part of the duo La 5ª Estación and in 2012 won for Best New Artist. In 2013 the Pop, Regional Mexican and Tropical Salsa New Artist of the Year categories were merged on a Lo Nuestro Award for Best New Artist category in the General Field. For the Lo Nuestro Awards of 2014, the Pop New Artist of the Year award was reinstated and merged again the following year.

== Winners and nominees ==
Listed below are the winners of the award for each year, as well as the other nominees for the majority of the years awarded.

Key	Meaning
‡	Indicates the winner

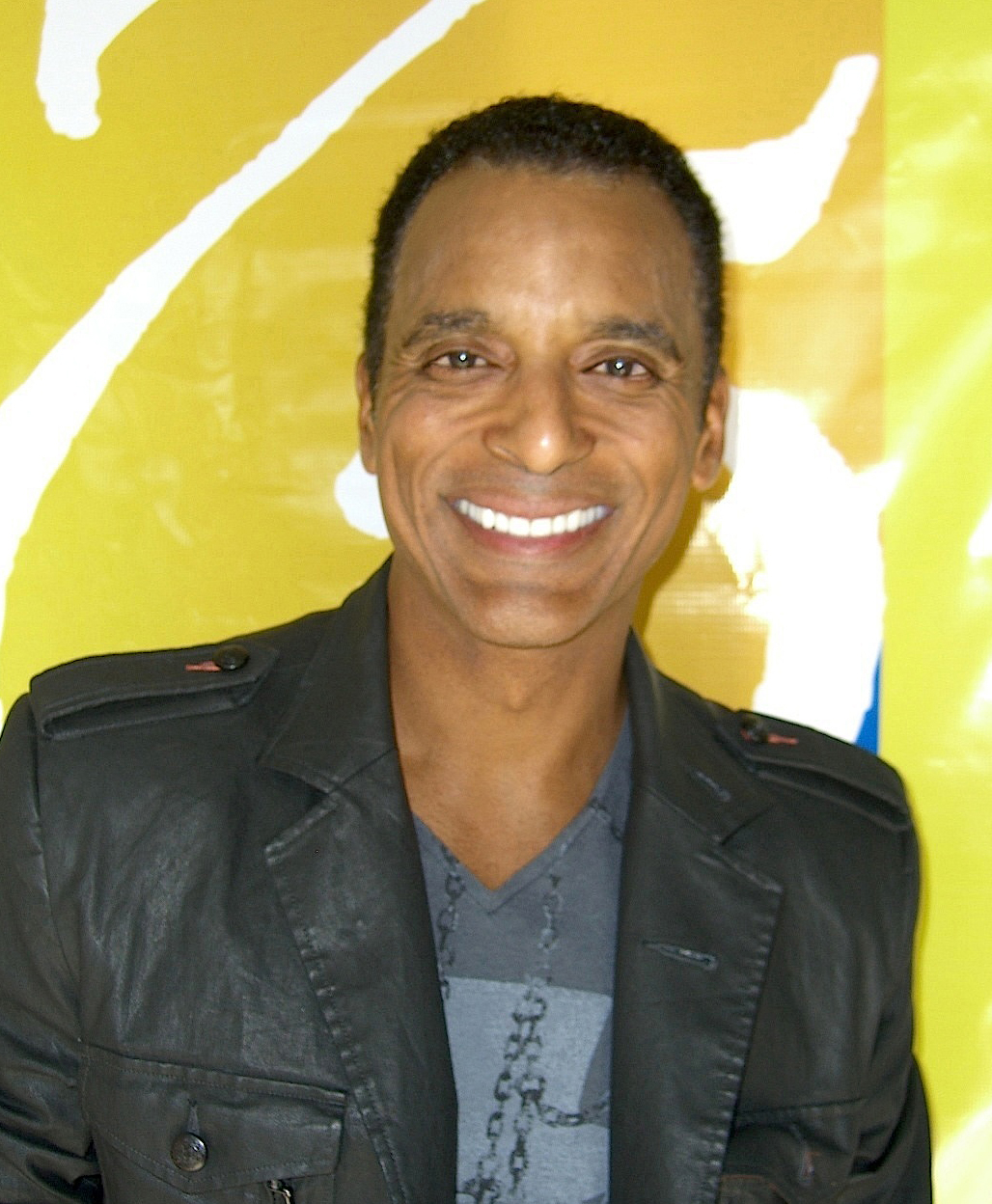
Cuban-American performer Jon Secada (pictured in 2011), winner in 1993

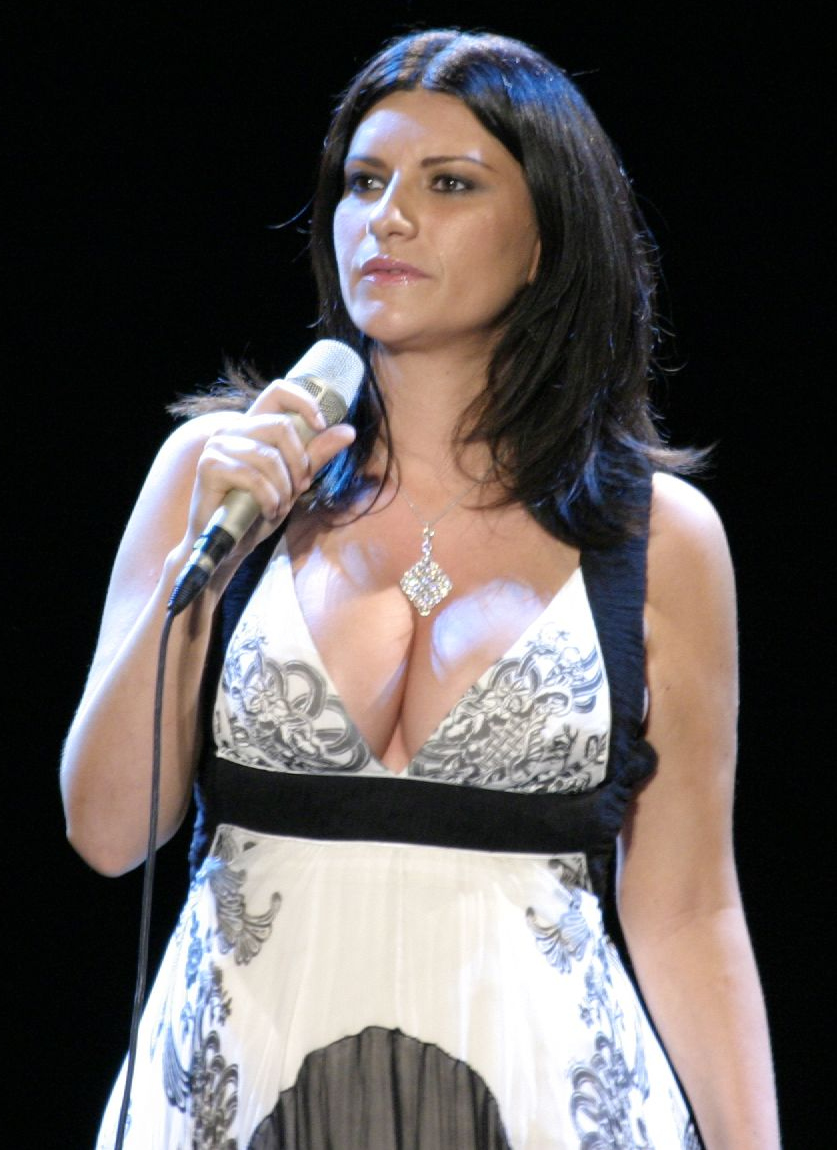
Italian singer Laura Pausini (pictured in 2007), winner in 1995

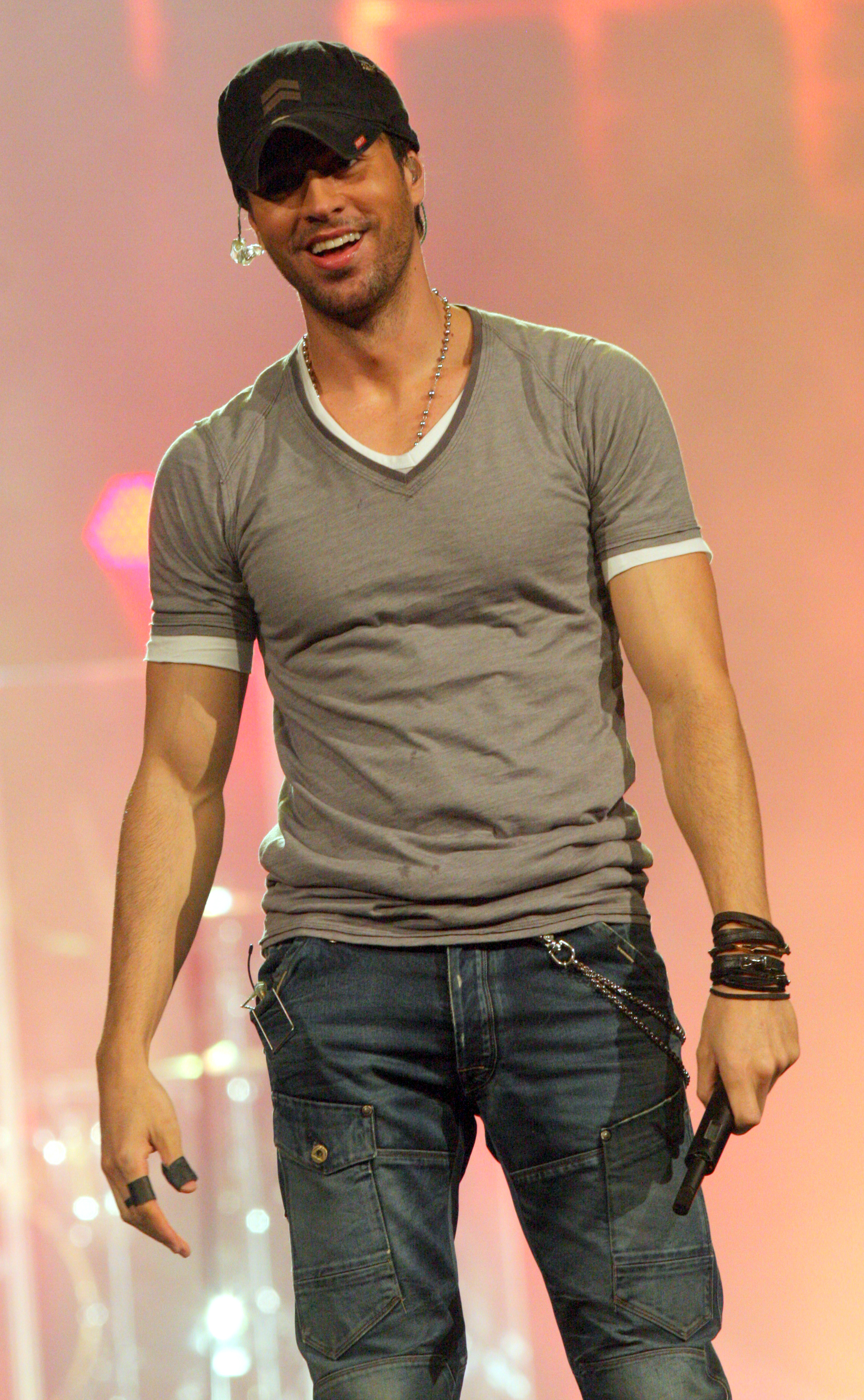
Spanish singer Enrique Iglesias (pictured in 2011), winner in 1996

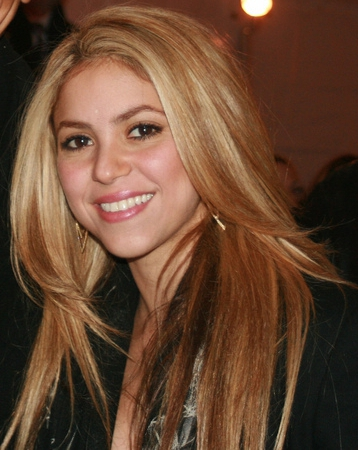
Colombian singer Shakira (pictured in 2009), winner in 1997

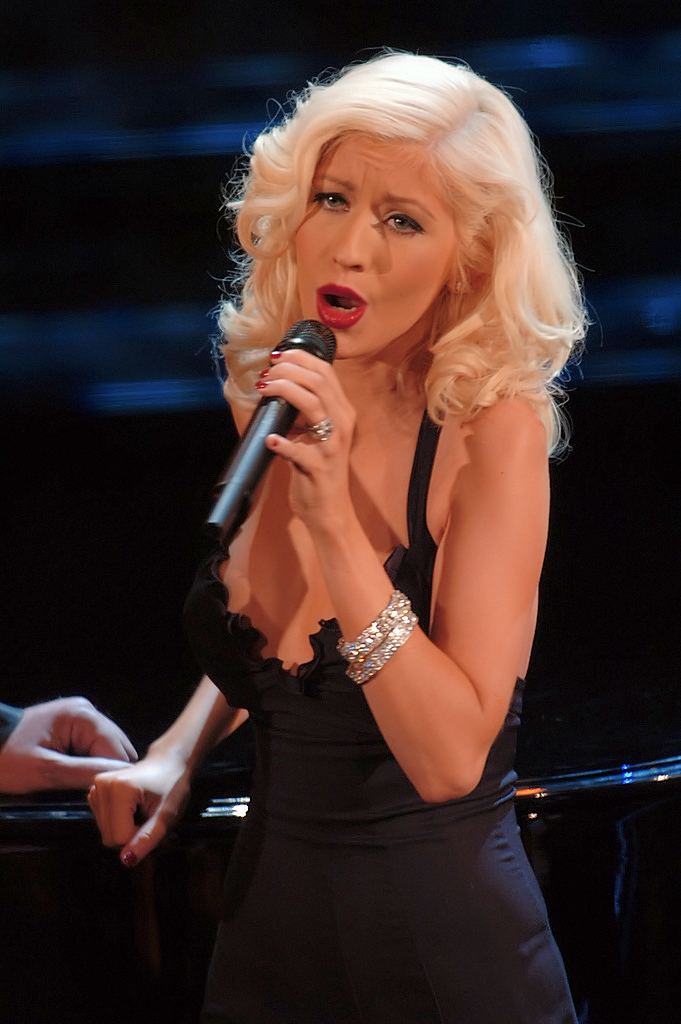
American singer Christina Aguilera (pictured in 2006), winner in 2000

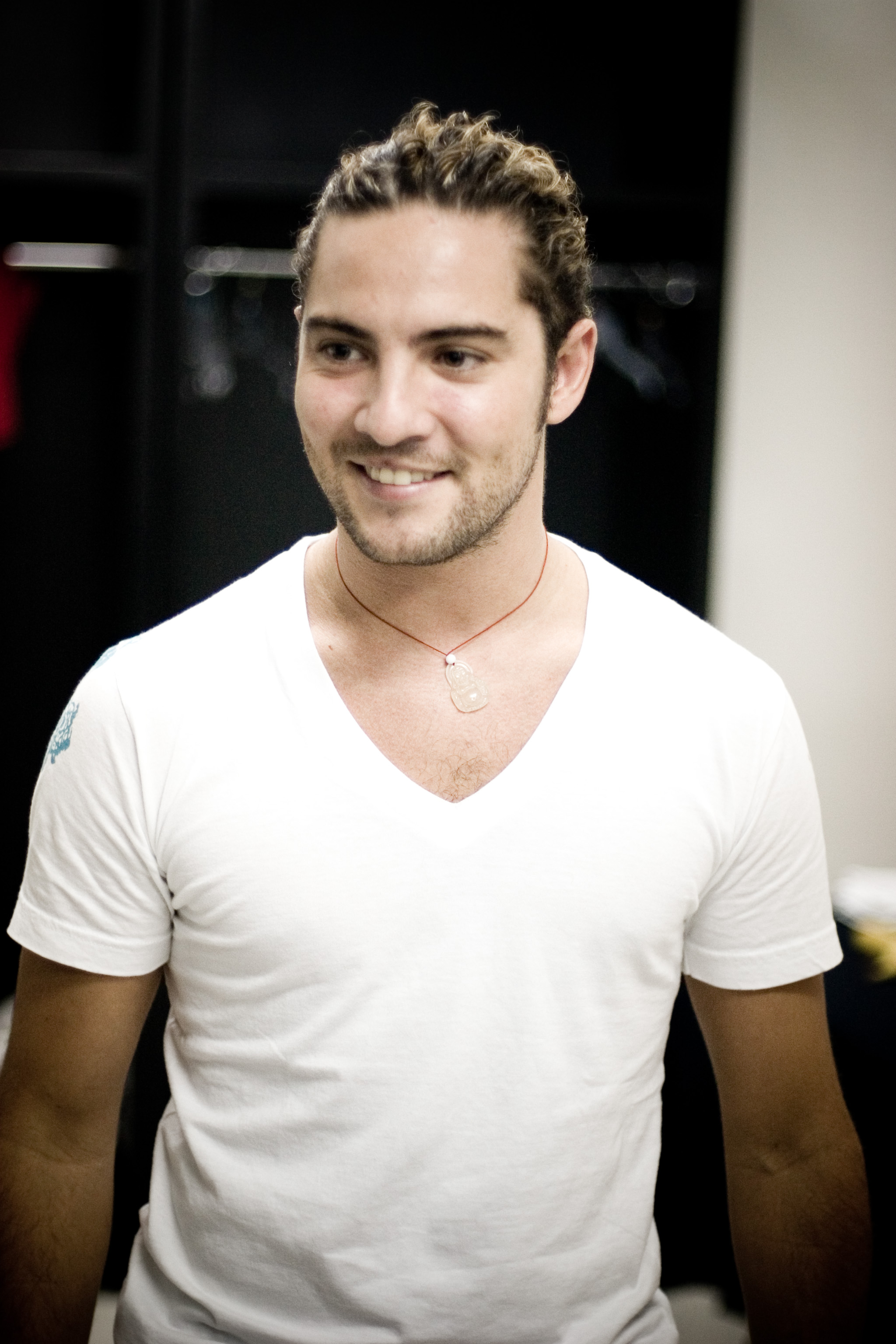
Spanish performer David Bisbal (pictured in 2006), winner in 2004

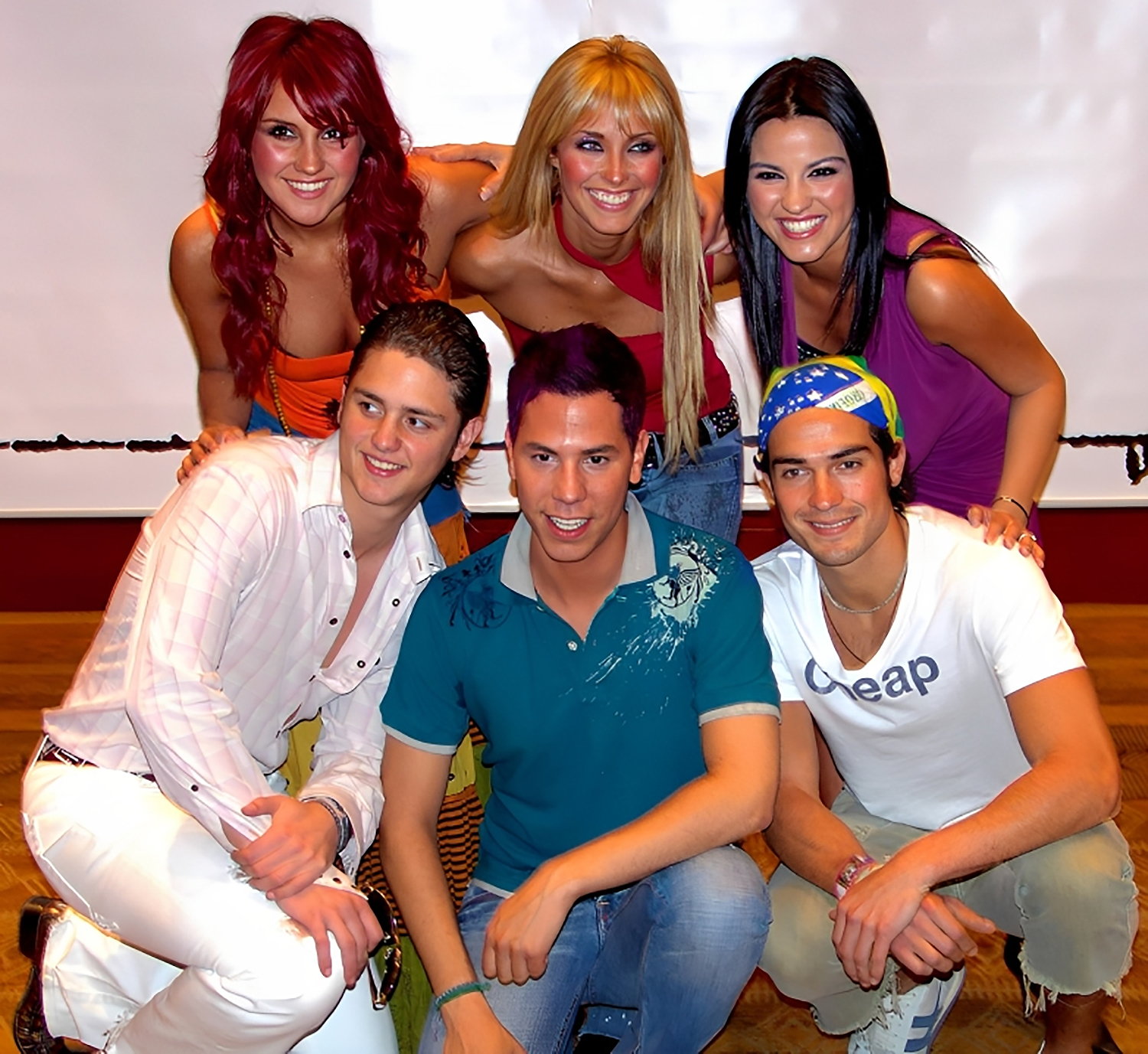
Mexican pop group RBD, winner in 2006

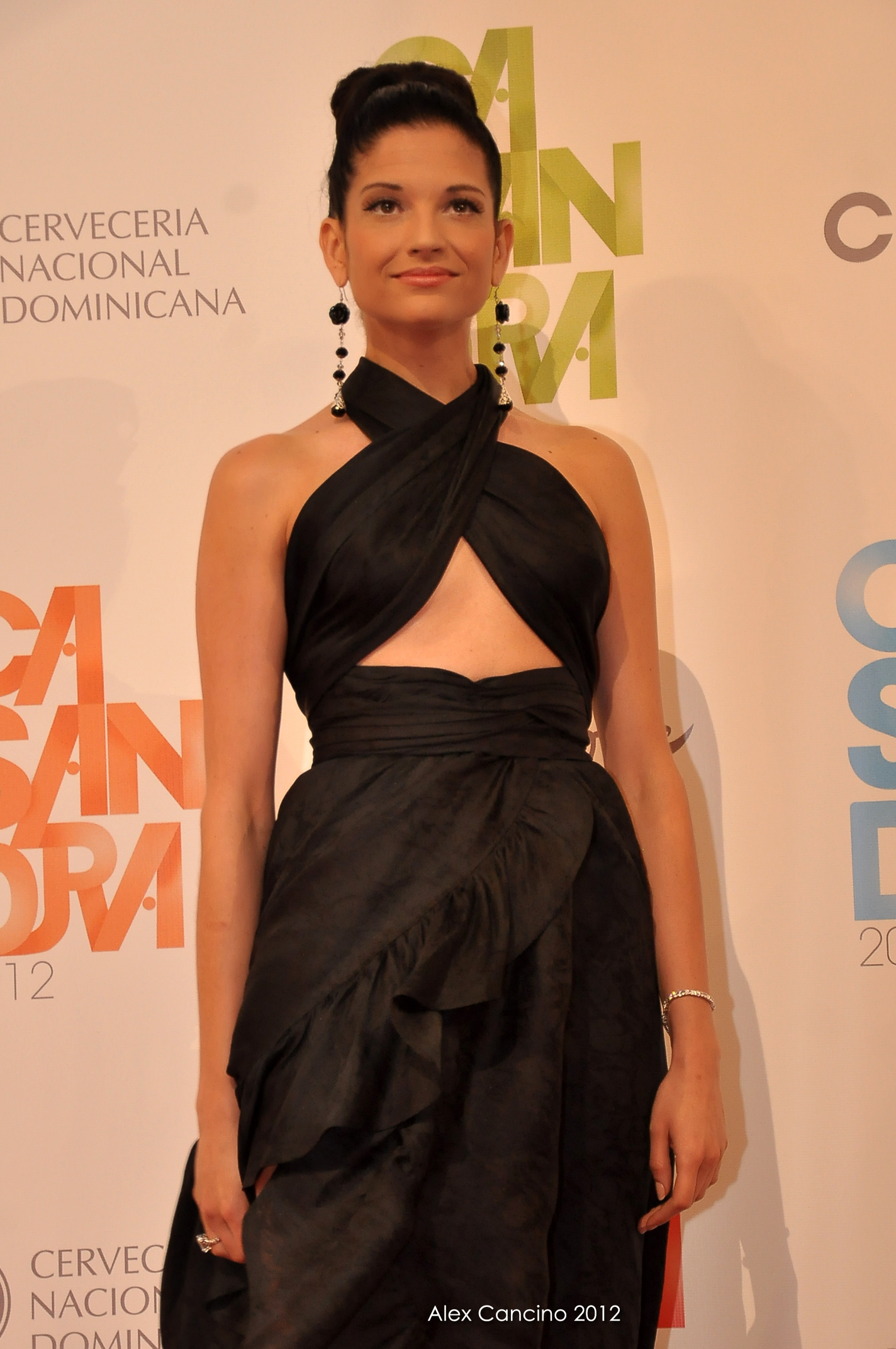
Spanish singer Natalia Jiménez (pictured in 2012), winner in 2012

Year	Performer	Ref
1989 (1st)	Gipsy Kings‡	
1989 (1st)	Hombres G	
1989 (1st)	José Javier Solís	
1989 (1st)	Carlos Vives	
1990 (2nd)	Kaoma‡	
1990 (2nd)	Teresa Guerra	
1990 (2nd)	Myriam Hernández	
1990 (2nd)	Pablo Ruiz	
1990 (2nd)	Xuxa	
1991 (3rd)	Azúcar Moreno‡	
1991 (3rd)	Raúl di Blasio	
1991 (3rd)	Garibaldi	
1991 (3rd)	Alejandra Guzmán	
1992 (4th)	Magneto‡	
1992 (4th)	H2O	
1992 (4th)	Ricky Martin	
1992 (4th)	Simone	
1993 (5th)	Jon Secada‡	
1993 (5th)	Bachata Magic	
1993 (5th)	Cristian Castro	
1993 (5th)	Paulina Rubio	
1994 (6th)	Los Fantasmas del Caribe‡	
1994 (6th)	Ricardo Arjona	
1994 (6th)	Barrio Boyzz	
1994 (6th)	The Triplets	
1995 (7th)	Laura Pausini‡	
1995 (7th)	Marcos Llunas	
1995 (7th)	Kairo	
1995 (7th)	Marta Sánchez	
1996 (8th)	Enrique Iglesias‡	
1996 (8th)	Donato y Estéfano	
1996 (8th)	Millie	
1996 (8th)	Thalía	
1997 (9th)	Shakira‡	
1997 (9th)	David	
1997 (9th)	Fey	
1997 (9th)	Gemini	
1998 (10th)	Jordi‡	
1998 (10th)	Angélica	
1998 (10th)	César Borja	
1998 (10th)	Victoria	
1999 (11th)	Carlos Ponce‡	
1999 (11th)	Andrea Bocelli	
1999 (11th)	El Reencuentro	
1999 (11th)	Nek	
1999 (11th)	Los Trí-O	
1999 (11th)	Só Pra Contrariar	
2000 (12th)	Jaci Velasquez‡	
2000 (12th)	El Símbolo	
2000 (12th)	Jennifer Lopez	
2000 (12th)	Noelia	
2001 (13th)	Christina Aguilera‡	
2001 (13th)	Azul Azul	
2001 (13th)	Oscar De La Hoya	
2001 (13th)	Tamara	
2002 (14th)	Eduardo Verástegui‡	
2002 (14th)	Alexandre Pires	
2002 (14th)	Shalim	
2002 (14th)	Tommy Torres	
2003 (15th)	Las Ketchup‡	
2003 (15th)	Alejandro Montaner	
2003 (15th)	Area 305	
2003 (15th)	Sin Bandera	
2004 (16th)	David Bisbal‡	
2004 (16th)	Ana Cristina	
2004 (16th)	Axé Bahia	
2004 (16th)	Linda Bandry	
2004 (16th)	Contagious	
2004 (16th)	Daniel René	
2004 (16th)	Érika	
2004 (16th)	Tiziano Ferro	
2004 (16th)	Frankie J	
2004 (16th)	Héctor	
2004 (16th)	Julio Iglesias Jr.	
2004 (16th)	Nadia López	
2004 (16th)	Los Tres	
2004 (16th)	Mia	
2004 (16th)	Roselyn Sánchez	
2004 (16th)	Álex Ubago	
2004 (16th)	Juan Fernando Velasco	
2004 (16th)	Yahir	
2005 (17th)	Kalimba‡	
2005 (17th)	Andy & Lucas	
2005 (17th)	Ha*Ash	
2005 (17th)	Negros	
2006 (18th)	RBD‡	
2006 (18th)	Lena	
2006 (18th)	Lu	
2006 (18th)	Reik	
2007 (19th)	Chelo‡	
2007 (19th)	Anaís	
2007 (19th)	Camila	
2007 (19th)	Yuridia	
2008 (20th)	Jennifer Lopez‡	
2008 (20th)	Beyoncé	
2008 (20th)	Kumbia All Starz	
2008 (20th)	Los Super Reyes	
2009 (21st)	Eiza/Lola‡	
2009 (21st)	Ana Isabelle	
2009 (21st)	Juan	
2009 (21st)	La Nueva Banda Timbiriche	
2009 (21st)	Playa Limbo	
2010 (22nd)	Nelly Furtado‡	
2010 (22nd)	Alexander Acha	
2010 (22nd)	Sonohra	
2010 (22nd)	Tati	
2010 (22nd)	Victor & Leo	
2011 (23rd)	Jencarlos Canela‡	
2011 (23rd)	Alex, Jorge y Lena	
2011 (23rd)	Debi Nova	
2012 (24th)	Natalia Jiménez‡	
2012 (24th)	Dulce María	
2012 (24th)	Christopher Uckermann	
2014 (26th)	América Sierra	
2014 (26th)	Marconi	
2014 (26th)	Rigú	
2014 (26th)	Viajero	

== See also ==
- Latin Grammy Award for Best New Artist
