= List of Pop Rock General number-one singles of the 2000s =

Pop-Rock General, in the music industry, is a music record chart that ranks the best-performing singles in Venezuela, which are collectively on each single's weekly physical and digital sales, as well as airplay, as reported by Record Report.

== Chart history ==
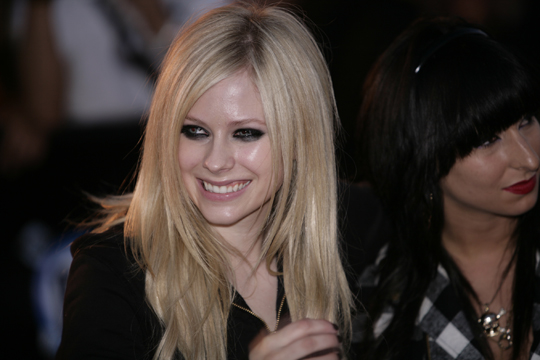
Avril Lavigne had six number-one songs on Pop Rock General in the 2000s, including the top song of 2007, "Girlfriend".

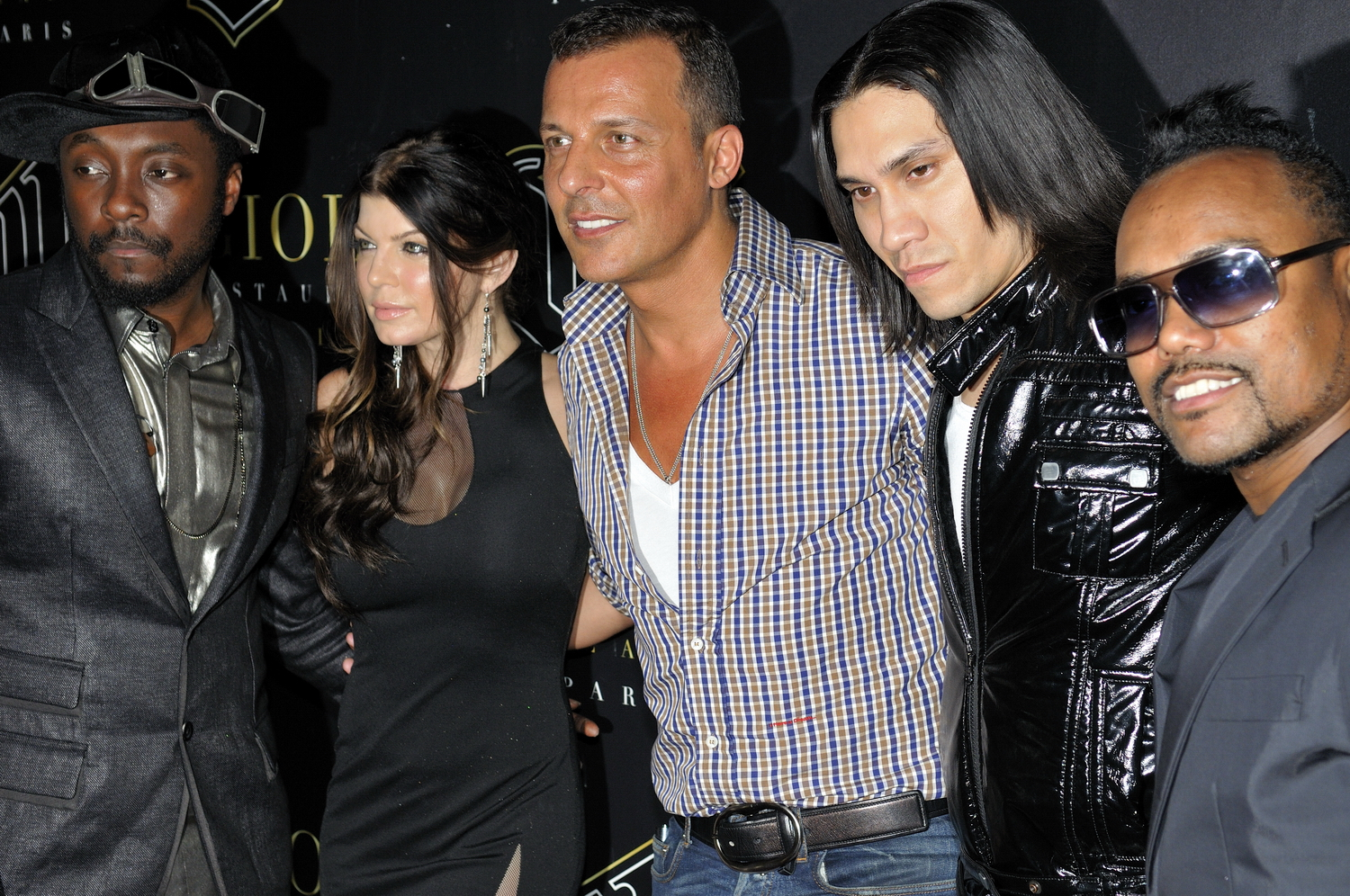
The Black Eyed Peas had eight number-one songs during the decade, twice scoring back-to-back chart toppers in 2006 and 2009.

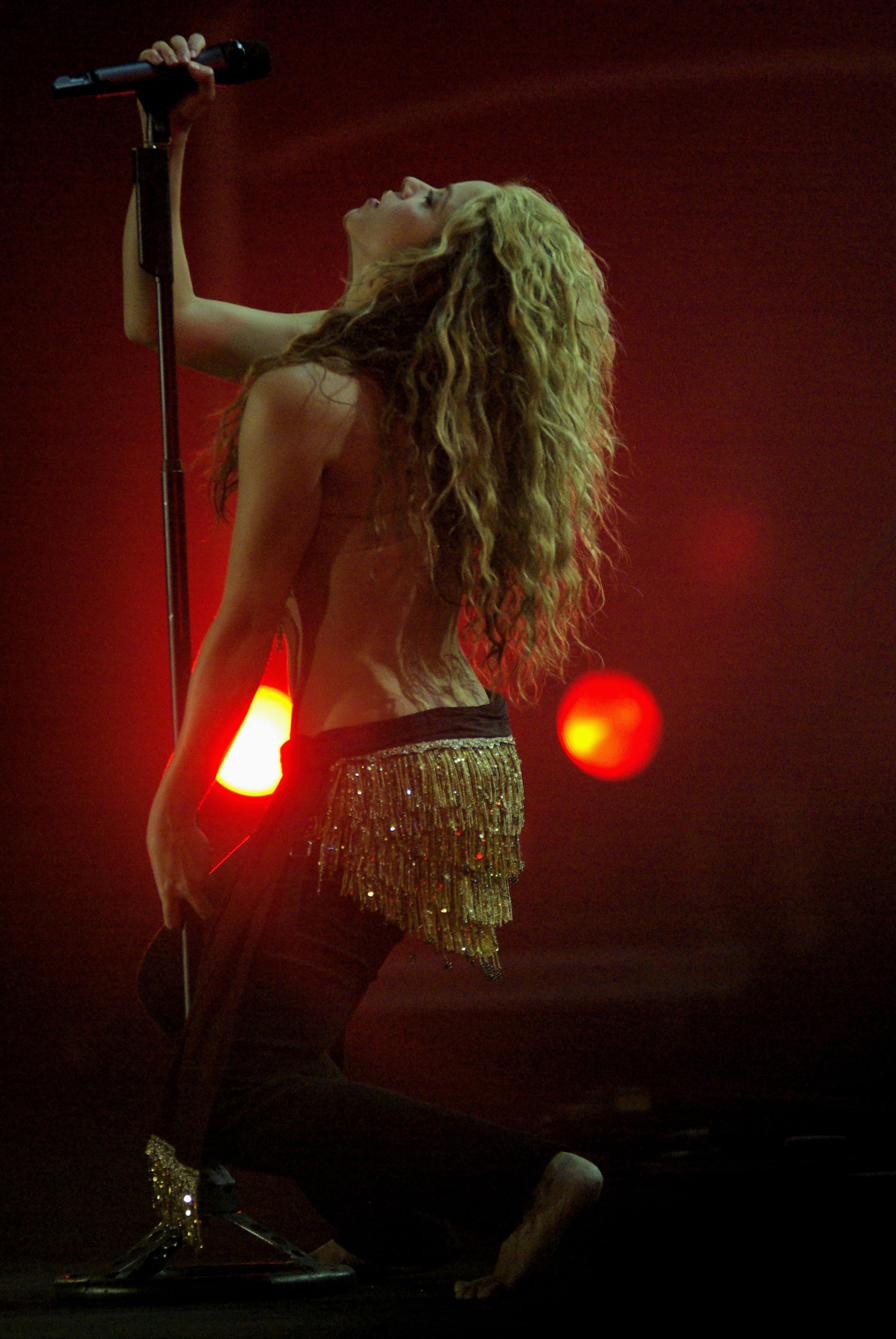
Shakira had number-one debuts with her singles, "Día de Enero" and "Hips Don't Lie", in 2006, and completed the decade with eight number-one hits.

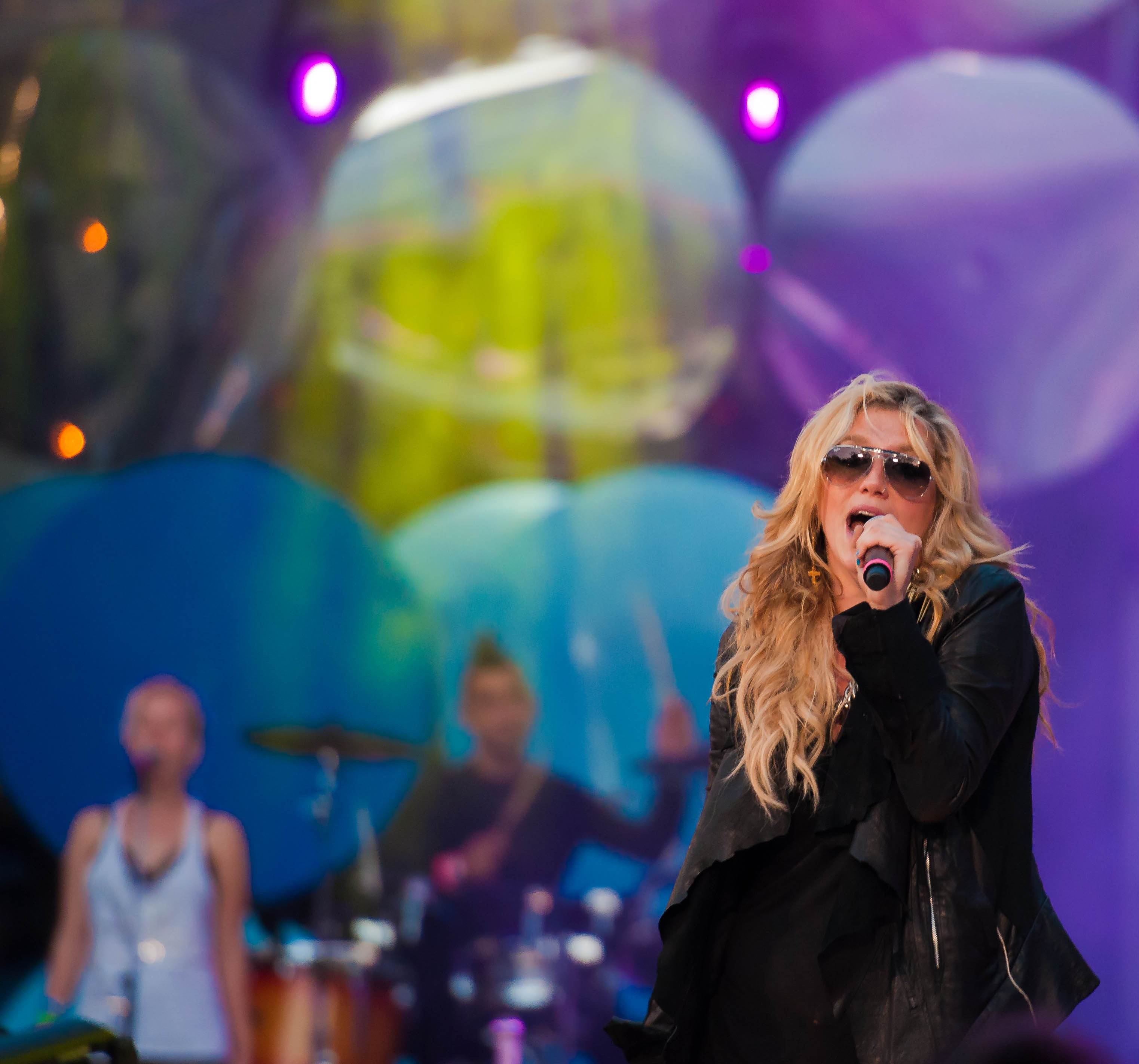
Kesha finished the 2000s at the top of the chart with her hit, "Tik Tok", with a 12-week run that continued through March 2010.

Key
†	Number-one song of the year

Issue date	Song	Artist(s)	Weeks at number one
2000
January 1	"What a Girl Wants"	Christina Aguilera	9
March 4	"Oops!... I Did It Again"	Britney Spears	10
May 13	"It's My Life"	Bon Jovi	5
June 17	"Be with You"	Enrique Iglesias	5
July 22	"Maria Maria"	Santana featuring The Product G&B	2
August 5	"Rock DJ"	Robbie Williams	5
September 9	"Music"	Madonna	5
October 14	"Come On Over Baby (All I Want Is You)"	Christina Aguilera	5
November 18	"Beautiful Day"	U2	4
December 16	"Don't Tell Me"	Madonna	11
2001
March 3	"Crawling"	Linkin Park	6
April 14	"Irresistible"	Jessica Simpson	2
April 28	"Fallin'"	Alicia Keys	2
May 12	"La Negra Tiene Tumbao"	Celia Cruz	3
June 2	"Lady Marmalade"	Christina Aguilera, Lil' Kim, Mýa and Pink	4
June 30	"Eternity/The Road to Mandalay"	Robbie Williams	7
August 18	"Whenever, Wherever"	Shakira	9
October 20	"Turn Off the Light"	Nelly Furtado	1
October 27	"You Rock My World"	Michael Jackson	4
November 24	"I'm a Slave 4 U"	Britney Spears	1
December 1	"In the End"	Linkin Park	4
December 29	"How You Remind Me"	Nickelback	7
2002
February 16	"I'm Not a Girl, Not Yet a Woman"	Britney Spears	2
March 2	"Don't Let Me Get Me"	Pink	6
April 13	"I'm Not a Girl, Not Yet a Woman"	Britney Spears	1
April 20	"How You Remind Me"	Nickelback	4
May 18	"Without Me"	Eminem	6
June 29	"Just Like a Pill"	Pink	4
July 27	"The Ketchup Song"	Las Ketchup	8
September 21	"Can't Get You Out of My Head"	Kylie Minogue	2
October 5	"Hero"	Enrique Iglesias	2
October 19	"Dirrty"	Christina Aguilera	3
November 9	"Work It"	Missy Elliott	1
November 16	"Die Another Day"	Madonna	2
November 30	"Get the Party Started"	Pink	3
December 21	"Complicated"	Avril Lavigne	9
2003
February 22	"Feel"	Robbie Williams	4
March 22	"I'm with You"	Avril Lavigne	2
April 5	"Beautiful"	Christina Aguilera	4
May 3	"I'm with You"	Avril Lavigne	1
May 10	"Fighter"	Christina Aguilera	3
May 31	"Rock Your Body"	Justin Timberlake	1
June 7	"American Life"	Madonna	5
July 12	"Miss Independent"	Kelly Clarkson	1
July 19	"Clocks"	Coldplay	7
September 6	"Bring Me to Life"	Evanescence	3
September 27	"Crazy in Love"	Beyoncé Knowles	6
November 8	"Where Is the Love?"	The Black Eyed Peas	1
November 15	"Can't Hold Us Down"	Christina Aguilera	1
November 22	"Trouble"	Pink	2
December 6	"So Yesterday"	Hilary Duff	1
December 13	"Me Against the Music"	Britney Spears featuring Madonna	1
December 20	"Shut Up"	The Black Eyed Peas	7
2004
February 7	"My Immortal"	Evanescence	3
February 28	"Come Clean"	Hilary Duff	4
March 27	"Toxic"	Britney Spears	2
April 10	"From the Inside"	Linkin Park	1
April 17	"Toxic"	Britney Spears	1
April 24	"This Love"	Maroon 5	4
May 22	"Yeah!"	Usher featuring Lil Jon and Ludacris	7
July 10	"Not in Love"	Enrique Iglesias	1
July 17	"Cerca de ti"	Thalía	1
July 24	"Don't Tell Me"	Avril Lavigne	4
August 21	"Everytime"	Britney Spears	1
August 28	"Pieces of Me"	Ashlee Simpson	2
September 11	"Let's Get It Started"	The Black Eyed Peas	3
October 2	"My Happy Ending"	Avril Lavigne	6
November 13	"She Will Be Loved"	Maroon 5	1
November 20	"American Idiot"	Green Day	4
December 18	"What You Waiting For?"	Gwen Stefani	10
2005
February 26	"Boulevard of Broken Dreams"†	Green Day	4
March 26	"Gasolina"	Daddy Yankee	2
April 9	"Si La Ves"	Franco De Vita	4
May 7	"Sometimes You Can't Make It on Your Own"	U2	2
May 21	"Lonely"	Akon	1
May 28	"We Belong Together"	Mariah Carey	1
June 4	"Hollaback Girl"	Gwen Stefani	4
July 2	"Don't Phunk with My Heart"	The Black Eyed Peas	2
July 16	"La Tortura"	Shakira featuring Alejandro Sanz	5
August 20	"Speed of Sound"	Coldplay	4
September 17	"Pon de Replay"	Rihanna	1
September 24	"No"	Shakira	1
October 1	"Breakaway"	Kelly Clarkson	1
October 8	"Because of You"	Kelly Clarkson	1
October 15	"Aún hay algo"	RBD	1
October 22	"Ay Dios"	Franco De Vita	3
November 12	"Don't Bother"	Shakira	2
November 26	"Hung Up"	Madonna	12
2006
February 18	"My Humps"	The Black Eyed Peas	2
March 4	"Pump It"	The Black Eyed Peas	4
April 1	"Día de Enero"	Shakira	8
May 27	"SOS"	Rihanna	2
June 10	"Get Together"	Madonna	5
July 15	"Hips Don't Lie"	Shakira featuring Wyclef Jean	3
August 5	"Si Tu Te vas"	Amigos Invisibles	2
August 19	"London Bridge"	Fergie	2
September 2	"Hips Don't Lie"	Shakira featuring Wyclef Jean	1
September 9	"SexyBack"	Justin Timberlake	5
October 14	"Hips Don't Lie"	Shakira featuring Wyclef Jean	3
November 4	"Me Desenfocas"	Mochuelo	1
November 11	"Welcome to the Black Parade"	My Chemical Romance	1
November 18	"Me Desenfocas"	Mochuelo	1
November 25	"Welcome to the Black Parade"	My Chemical Romance	2
December 9	"Fergalicious"	Fergie	1
December 16	"The Saints Are Coming"	U2 and Green Day	3
2007
January 6	"Si te da la Gana"	Hany Kauam	4
February 3	"No Eres Tú"	Caramelos de Cianuro	1
February 10	"Si te da la Gana"	Hany Kauam	10
April 21	"Beautiful Liar"	Beyoncé Knowles featuring Shakira	2
May 5	"Girlfriend"†	Avril Lavigne	4
June 2	"Beautiful Liar"	Beyoncé Knowles featuring Shakira	1
June 9	"Girlfriend"†	Avril Lavigne	2
June 23	"Impacto"	Daddy Yankee featuring Fergie	4
July 21	"Girlfriend"†	Avril Lavigne	4
August 18	"1973"	James Blunt	3
September 8	"When You're Gone"	Avril Lavigne	2
September 22	"1973"	James Blunt	3
October 13	"No lo Puedes Ver"	Cabaret	1
October 20	"Hablame"	Mariana Vega	3
November 10	"No lo Puedes Ver"	Cabaret	1
November 17	"Hablame"	Mariana Vega	2
December 1	"Cerca del oido"	Ultrachic	12
2008
February 23	"No me queda nada"	Mariana Vega	10
May 3	"4 Minutes"	Madonna featuring Justin Timberlake	1
May 10	"No me queda nada"	Mariana Vega	1
May 17	"4 Minutes"	Madonna featuring Justin Timberlake	4
June 14	"Secreto"	Ultrachic	1
June 21	"Mercy"	Duffy	1
June 28	"Secreto"	Ultrachic	2
July 12	"Mercy"	Duffy	1
July 19	"Give It 2 Me"	Madonna	1
July 26	"Mercy"	Duffy	1
August 2	"Te di"	Mariana Vega	1
August 9	"Give It 2 Me"	Madonna	1
August 16	"Viva la Vida"	Coldplay	1
August 23	"Give It 2 Me"	Madonna	1
August 30	"Viva la Vida"	Coldplay	1
September 6	"I Kissed a Girl"†	Katy Perry	8
November 1	"I'm Yours"	Jason Mraz	3
November 22	"Just Dance"	Lady Gaga featuring Colby O'Donis	1
November 29	"Hot n Cold"	Katy Perry	2
December 13	"Da igual"	Guaco	5
2009
January 17	"Hot n Cold"	Katy Perry	2
January 31	"Lost!"	Coldplay	2
February 14	"Mentiras"	Amigos Invisibles	1
February 21	"Poker Face"	Lady Gaga	2
March 7	"Right Round"	Flo Rida	3
March 28	"Colgando en tus manos"	Carlos Baute featuring Marta Sánchez	8
May 23	"Boom Boom Pow"	The Black Eyed Peas	7
July 11	"I Gotta Feeling"†	The Black Eyed Peas	12
October 3	"She Wolf"	Shakira	2
October 17	"Party in the U.S.A."	Miley Cyrus	3
November 7	"3"	Britney Spears	1
November 14	"Meet Me Halfway"	The Black Eyed Peas	4
December 12	"Bad Romance"	Lady Gaga	1
December 19	"Tik Tok"	Kesha	12
