= Alex, Jorge y Lena (album) =

Studio album by Alex, Jorge y Lena
- Released: September 21, 2010
- Genre: Latin pop
- Label: Warner Music Latina

Singles from Alex, Jorge y Lena
- 1. "Estar Contigo" Released: June 29, 2010; 2. "La Canción del Pescado" Released: April 2011; 3. "Las Cosas Que Me Encantan" Released: July 2011; 4. "Si Ya No Tengo Tu Corazón" Released: July 2011

Alex, Jorge y Lena is the self-titled debut studio album by the supergroup, formed by the singer-songwriters and multi-instrumentalists Lena Burke, Álex Ubago and Jorge Villamizar billed as Alex, Jorge y Lena. It as released under the label Warner Music Latina on September 21, 2010. The songs on the album are mostly about love and relationships and musically the album is a Latin pop.

The first single, "Estar Contigo" was released on June 29, 2010, charted in the United States. The second single, "La Canción del Pescado" had a good reception in the Latin Pop airplay chart on United States. And "Las Cosas Que Me Encantan" and "Si Ya No Tengo Tu Corazón" were released as the third and fourth singles from the album, respectively.

== Album information ==
Alex, Jorge y Lena's debut album, Alex, Jorge y Lena was produced by Mexican singer-songwriter Aureo Baqueiro. Burke, Ubago and Villamizar wrote all the songs on the album. Ubago said that the album includes 12 tracks since they had a lot of material to choose from, "everything was very fluid, we felt the chemistry and also the stars lined up." Each member played an instrument; Villamizar and Ubago played guitar and Burke played piano.

Alex, Jorge y Lena was released on September 21, 2010 and peaked at number 13 in the Billboard Latin Pop Albums and 17 at the Mexican Albums Chart. Alex, Jorge y Lena held a promotional tour in Spain and Latin America.

== Singles ==
Alex, Jorge y Lena "Estar Contigo" (2010)
A sample of "Estar Contigo", a ballad written by Álex Ubago which was released as their first single.

- "Estar Contigo" was the first single to be released from the album. It was written by Ubago and was originally recorded by him and Burke. The track was released to radio on July 26, 2010, and peaked at number 22 in the Billboard Top Latin Songs chart. About the song, Villamizar said: "When I heard the song with their voices, I said 'I do not sing' ". Then they sent the recording to the label, who immediately asked, "Where's Jorge?" and returned the song to be completed by the trio. This changed the nature of the song; according to Gabriela Martinez, Vice President of Marketing at Warner Music Latina, "Estar Contigo" "went from being a song [about a] romantic couple, a love song, [to one] may be between father and son or friends, every relationship is applied."
- "La Canción del Pescado" was the second single from the album and was released in April 2011. The track peaked at number 37 in the Billboard Latin Pop Airplay chart.
- "Las Cosas Que Me Encantan" was released in July 2011 as the third single from the album. The video for "Las Cosas Que Me Encantan" was also recorded in Mexico City; and included additional footage from their live performance at the Festival Valladolid in Spain.
- "Si Ya No Tengo Tu Corazón" was released as the fourth and last single. Alex, Jorge y Lena recorded a music video for "Si Ya No Tengo Tu Corazón" during a live concert in Mexico City as a part of their promotional tour.

== Track listing ==
No.	Title	Writer(s)	Length
1.	"La Canción del Pescado"	Pilar Quiroga, Jorge Villamizar	3:44
2.	"Mil Maneras De Querer"	Alex Ubago, Jorge Villamizae	3:38
3.	"Estar Contigo"	Alex Ubago	4:22
4.	"¿Quien Será?"	Lena Burke, Rey Nerio	3:49
5.	"Las Cosas Que Me Encantan"	Alex Ubago	4:14
6.	"Ya Sabes Como Soy"	Alex Ubago	4:22
7.	"Si Ya No Tengo Tu Corazón"	Lena Burke	4:09
8.	"Versos de Amor"	Chucho Merchán, Jorge Villamizar	4:09
9.	"A La Vuelta De La Esquina"	Claudia Brant, Jorge Villamizar	3:30
10.	"Huella"	Lena Burke, Rey Nerio	4:08
11.	"Sobre El Suelo Mojado"	Alex Ubago	3:39
12.	"Mas Na' Contigo"	Lena Burke, Jorge Villamizar	3:14
Total length:			48:38

iTunes bonus track
No.	Title	Length
13.	"Vida Pasada"	3:30
14.	"Eso Eres Tú"	3:32
15.	"Estar Contigo (Urban Mix)"	4:13
16.	"Estar Contigo (Music video)"	4:26

Special Edition (Only Mexico)
No.	Title	Length
13.	"Vida Pasada"	3:30
14.	"Eso Eres Tú"	3:32
15.	"Estar Contigo (Urban Mix)"	4:13
16.	"Si Ya No Tengo Tu Corazón (Remix)"	3:26

== Charts ==
Chart (2010–2011)	Peak position
Mexican Albums Chart	19
US Latin Pop Albums	13

== Awards and nominations ==
On September 14, 2011, Alex, Jorge y Lena received two Latin Grammy Award nominations, for Album of the Year and Best Pop Album by a Duo or Group with Vocals for their 2010 release, with an additional nomination for Aureo Baqueiro as Producer of the Year for his work on the album.

Year	Award	Nominated work	Category	Result	References
2011	Latin Grammy Award	Alex, Jorge y Lena	Album of the Year	Nominated	
2011	Latin Grammy Award	Alex, Jorge y Lena	Best Pop Album by a Duo or Group with Vocals	Won	
