= Tan Sólo Tú =

Single by Franco De Vita featuring Alejandra Guzmán

from the album En Primera Fila
- Released: March 15, 2011
- Recorded: Comtel Studios; Miami, Florida
- Genre: Pop
- Length: 3:57
- Label: Sony
- Songwriter: Franco De Vita
- Producers: David Cabrera, De Vita

Franco De Vita singles chronology
| "Cuando Tus Ojos Me Ven" (2009) | "Tan Sólo Tú" (2011) | "Si Quieres Decir Adiós" (2011) |

Alejandra Guzmán singles chronology
| "Día de Suerte" (2011) | "Tan Sólo Tú" (2011) | "Un Grito en la Noche" (2011) |

"Tan Sólo Tú" ("Only You") is a Latin pop song by Venezuelan recording artist Franco De Vita from his third live album En Primera Fila (2011). Produced by David Cabrera and De Vita, the track was released as the album's first single in Latin America and the United States and it is performed as a duet with Mexican singer Alejandra Guzmán.

The song was critically appreciated for the performers musical style union. "Tan Sólo Tú" has charted within the top twenty in the United States and became fifth top ten single for Guzmán on Billboard's Latin Pop Songs chart and De Vita's sixth. The music video for the song, portrayed both performers at the recording sessions of En Primera Fila. "Tan Sólo Tú" was nominated for Record of the Year and Best Short Form Music Video at the 12th Latin Grammy Awards.

== Background ==
"Tan Sólo Tú" was written by Venezuelan singer-songwriter Franco De Vita, produced by David Cabrera and De Vita, and performed as a duet between De Vita and Mexican singer Alejandra Guzmán for De Vita's album En Primera Fila, a live performance recorded before a small audience in an intimate setting, resemblant to MTV Unplugged. About Primera Fila De Vita declared: "The project was good for me, since I wanted to refresh many songs, some of them composed and recorded 25 years ago to incorporate a current sound and change some things. But the songs remains the same." Two songs one the album were previously unreleased, "Mira Más Allá" and "Tan Sólo Tú", with De Vita selecting Guzmán to record the latter since he thought she was "perfect" for the song.

== Recording and reception ==
The song was recorded, along the rest of the tracks for En Primera Fila, from January 20–21, 2011 at the Comtel Studios in Miami, Florida, United States. De Vita was supported by a band of 15 members and was joined on stage by a handful of guest performers, such as Santiago Cruz, Gilberto Santa Rosa, Soledad Pastorutti, Debi Nova, Leonel García, Noel Schajris and Guzmán. According to De Vita, Guzmán had the most complicated song on the album, the lead single. De Vita and Guzmán recorded the track twice, with Guzmán standing beside De Vita's piano. Guzmán was nervous before the recording and admitted being a fan of De Vita. According to Angelica Mora of AOL, this reunion "kept the romanticism that has characterized De Vita throughout his career, and coupled with the unique voice of Guzmán, creates an original combination." The song was nominated for a Latin Grammy Award for Record of the Year. In Mexico, "Tan Sólo Tú" was nominated for Song of the Year at the Premios Oye!.

== Music video ==
The music video for the song was directed by Diego Alvarez, and presents several general shots of the studio where the album was recorded, and footage of other members of the band that accompanied the singers. De Vita is playing the piano and singing the track, while Guzman remains standing during her performance, flirting with the audience and with De Vita. The song was recorded as part of the DVD that accompanies the standard version of the album. Upon video release, the magazine People en Español declared that there is an "intense" chemistry between the pair, musically intense. The music video received a Latin Grammy Award nomination for Best Short Form Music Video.

== Appearances in the media ==
The solo version of this song (which features only De Vita) was used as the love theme for Mauricio and Elisa in the Mexican telenovela, Emperatriz. The duet version wasn't used since its opposite telenovela, Una Familia Con Suerte, uses "Día de Suerte" by Guzman, as the main theme.

== Chart performance ==
"Tan Sólo Tú" was selected as the lead single from the album and also as the main theme for the Argentinian series Los únicos, helping the song to be widely played in Argentina. In the United States, the track peaked at number 15 in the Billboard Latin Songs and at number three in the Latin Pop Songs charts, becoming De Vita's sixth top ten single and Guzmán's fifth. In Mexico, the song peaked at number four on the Monitor Latino chart.

== Certifications ==
| Region | Certification | Certified units/sales |
|---|---|---|
| Mexico (AMPROFON) | Platinum+Gold | 90,000^{*} |
^{*} Sales figures based on certification alone.

== Track listing and formats ==
- Digital download
1. "Tan Sólo Tú" – 3:57
