= Linda Bandry =

Latin-American singer

Linda Bandry is a Latin-American singer. Bandry released in 2003 her debut album Como Luna and the following year, at the 16th Lo Nuestro Awards, received a nomination for Pop New Artist of the Year.
