= Simplemente La Verdad =

Studio album by Franco De Vita
- Released: September 23, 2008
- Genre: Latin pop
- Label: Sony Music

Franco De Vita chronology
Mil y Una Historias En Vivo (2006)	Simplemente La Verdad (2008)	En Primera Fila (2011)

Simplemente La Verdad (Simply the Truth) is a 2008 album released by Franco De Vita. The album received a Latin Grammy Award nomination for Best Singer-Songwriter Album.

== Track listing ==
1. "Simplemente La Verdad"
2. "Si Un Día Te Vuelvo A Ver"
3. "Mi Sueño"
4. "Probablemente"
5. "Cuando Tus Ojos Me Miran"
6. "No Se Olvida"
7. "Callo"
8. "Palabras Del Corazón"
9. "Cántame"
10. "10 Años Y Un Día"
11. "Cuando Tus Ojos Me Miran (Libre)"

== Charts ==
Chart (2008)	Peak position
US Top Latin Albums (Billboard)	14
US Latin Pop Albums (Billboard)	4
