= Segundas partes también son buenas =

Studio album by Franco De Vita
- Released: March 19, 2002
- Recorded: 2001–02
- Genre: Pop
- Label: Sony Music Latin

Franco De Vita chronology
Nada Es Igual (1999)	Segundas partes también son buenas (2002)	Stop (2004)

Segundas Partes Tambien Son Buenas ("Sequels are also good")is the eighth album by Franco De Vita released on New Years Day of 2002 on January 1, 2002 on Universal label. This was De Vita's only release for the company. On the CD, he re-recorded several of his earlier hits using different Latin music styles. The disc featured De Vita's first officially released recording of "Vuelve," a song he wrote that became a major hit for Ricky Martin. One new song, "Como Decirte No," was a hit on the Billboard Latin music charts for De Vita.

== Track listing ==
1. Promesas
2. Palabras del corazón
3. Vuelve
4. Louis
5. Latino
6. Como decirte no
7. Aún Vivo
8. Lo que espero de ti
9. Sexo
10. No hace falta decirlo
11. Como apartarte de Mí
12. Cómo decirte no (Pop Latino)

== Personnel ==
- Photography - Adolfo Pérez Butrón
- Arranger, Direction, Musical Direction, Producer - Angel "Cucco" Peña
- Editing, Programming - Arturo Cabrera
- Arranger - Camilo Valencia
- Mandoline - Carlos Kolenda
- Coro - Carlos Puchi
- Arranger, Piano - Ceferino Caban
- Engineer - Cesar Sogbe
- Percussion - Charlie Sierra
- Coro - Chegui Ramos
- Mastering Engineer - Chris Gehringer
- Executive Producer - César Pulido
- Coro - Darvel Garcia
- Electric Guitar - David Cabrera
- Background Vocals - Diane Wilde
- Trombone - Domingo Pagliuca
- Choir Arrangement, Executive Producer - Eddie Fernandez
- Production Assistant - Ernesto Soto C.
- Art Direction, Vestuario - Fabian Vergara
- Keyboards, Programming - Fernando Muscolo
- Administrative Coordinator, Arranger, Composer, Dirigida, Primary Artist, Producer, Realization - Franco De Vita
- Engineer - Gabriel Peña
- Coro - Gilberto Bermúdez
- Engineer - Héctor Iván Rosa
- Bateria - Iván Velásquez
- Engineer - Joe Caldas
- Vocals - John Charles Thomas
- Choir Arrangement - Jorge Del Barrio
- Trombone - Jorge Diaz
- Engineer - Jose Luis Estrada
- Tenor Saxophone - Jose Rios
- Coro - Josué Rosado
- Flugelhorn, Trumpet - José Sibaja
- Assistant, Recording Assistant - Juan Cristobal Losada
- Accordion - Judith Mora Arriaga
- Baritone Saxophone, Tenor Saxophone - Julio Flores
- Bajo Sexto - Julio Hernández
- Bateria - Lee Levin
- Arranger - Leo Quintero
- Flugelhorn, Trumpet - Luis Aquino
- Arranger, Arreglos, Dirigida, Keyboards, Organ (Hammond), Piano, Producer, Programming, Realization, Sequencing - Luis Romero
- Multi Instruments, Percussion - Luisito Quintero
- Acoustic Guitar, Electric Guitar, Requinto - Manny López
- Graphic Design - Mario Houben
- Orchestra, Seccion De Cuerdas - Miami Symphony Orchestra
- Bajo Sexto - Miguel Blanco
- Trombone - Moisés Nogueras
- Mixing Assistant, Recording Assistant - Norman Smith
- Pro-Tools - Oliver Quintero
- Engineer - Papo Sanchez
- Violin - Pedro Alfonso
- Bajo Sexto - Pedro Pérez
- Timbales - Rafael "Tito" DeGracia
- Vocals - Rafael Henriquez
- Trombone - Raffi Torres
- Harmonica - Randy Singer
- Acoustic Guitar, Requinto - Rene Toledo
- Bajo Sexto - Sal Cuevas
- Art Coordinator - Santiago Alonzo
- Trumpet - Vicente Cusi Castillo
- Coro - Victor Mendoza
- Vocals - Vladimir Quintero
- Coro - Wichy Camacho
- Congas, Percussion - William Thompson

== Charts ==
Chart (2002)	Peak position
US Top Latin Albums (Billboard)	29
US Latin Pop Albums (Billboard)	13
