= Mil y Una Historias en Vivo =

Mil y Una Historias En Vivo

Live album by Franco De Vita
- Released: September 26, 2006
- Genre: Latin pop
- Label: Sony Music Latin

Franco De Vita chronology
Stop (2004)	Mil y Una Historias En Vivo (2006)	Simplemente La Verdad (2008)

Mil y Una Historias En Vivo is a 2006 album by Franco De Vita. The album earned a Latin Grammy Award nomination for Best Male Pop Vocal Album.

== Track listing ==
1. "Tengo" (studio) Pop Version
2. "Ay Dios" (studio) con Diego “El Cigala”
3. "Te Veo Venir Soledad" (studio) con Alejandro Fernández
4. "Tengo" (studio, tropical version)
5. "Intro"
6. "Latino"
7. "Calido y Frio"
8. "Tu De Que Vas"
9. "Fuera de este Mundo"
10. "Somos Tres"
11. "Te Amo"
12. "Si La Ves" con Reyli y Jeremías
13. "Si Tu No Estas"
14. "Popurrí: Aqui Estas Otra Vez / Ya Lo He Vivido / Si Quieres Decir Adios / Y Te Pienso / Solo Importas Tu / Te Recordare
15. "Louis"
16. "No Basta"
17. "No Hay Cielo"
18. "Un Buen Perdedor"

== Charts ==
Chart (2006)	Peak position
US Top Latin Albums (Billboard)	25
US Latin Pop Albums (Billboard)	8
US Heatseekers Albums (Billboard)	20

== Sales and certifications ==
Region	Certification	Certified units/sales
Mexico (AMPROFON)	Platinum+Gold	150,000^{^}
^{^} Shipments figures based on certification alone.
