= Nada es igual (Franco De Vita album) =

Nada Es Igual

Studio album by Franco De Vita
- Released: 6 July 1999
- Recorded: 1998–99
- Genre: Pop
- Label: Sony Music

Franco De Vita chronology
Fuera de Este Mundo (1996)	Nada Es Igual (1999)	Segundas partes también son buenas (2002)

Nada Es Igual (Nothing Is the Same) is the seventh album by Franco De Vita released on July 6, 1999 with the Sony label. The CD produced "Traigo Una Pena," a Top 5 hit on the Billboard Latin music charts. Other hits from the disc include "Si Tú No Estás" and "Te Veo Venir, Soledad."

== Track listing ==
1. Si tú no estás
2. Te recordaré
3. Nada es igual
4. Traigo una pena (Gilberto Santa Rosa, Victor Manuelle y Cheo Feliciano)
5. Cuento con María
6. Te veo venir, Soledad (bachata)
7. Preso de mi propio sentimiento
8. Lluvia
9. Quién lo iba a saber
10. Te veo venir, Soledad (reggae)
11. Lluvia (tonada)

== Personnel ==
- Arranger - Afí Agüero
- Piano, Producer - Alejandro Campos
- Assistant - Alex Caballero
- Assistant - Alfred Figueroa
- Concert Master - Alfredo Oliva
- Spanish Guitar - Antonio Rayo, Sr.
- Bateria, Percussion - Archie Pena
- Arranger - Camilo Valencia
- Arranger, Producer, Programming - Carlos "Nene" Quintero
- Assistant Engineer - Carlos Alvarez
- Arranger, Violin - Carlos Kolenda
- Engineer - Cesar Sogbe
- Bateria, Percussion - Chavo Martínez
- Choir/Chorus, Coros - Chegui Ramos
- Engineer, Mastering - Chris Gehringer
- Arranger, Producer - Cucco Peña
- Trombone - Dana Teboe
- Percussion - Daniel Bonilla
- Arranger, Concept - Daniel Herrera
- Percussion - Daniel Lopez
- Choir/Chorus, Coros - Darvel Garcia
- Saxophone - Ed Calle
- Percussion - Edwin Bonilla
- Bongos, Percussion - Enrique Meija
- Keyboards - Fernándo Músculo
- Arranger, Composer, Primary Artist, Producer - Franco De Vita
- Engineer - Gerardo Lopez
- Concept, Harmonica - Gustavo Lezcano
- Arranger, Programming - Irguen Méndez
- Bateria - Ivan Valázquez
- Trumpet - Jason Carder
- Engineer - Javier Garza
- Engineer - Joe Numma
- Arranger - Jorge Del Barrio
- Guitar - Jorge Lavois
- Flamenco Guitar - Josep Salvador
- Choir/Chorus, Coros - Josué Rosado
- Assistant - José Cruz
- Bandola - José Vincente Muñoz
- Producer - Juan Luis Guerra
- Arranger - Juanito Márquez
- Bajo Sexto - Julio Hernández
- Bajo Sexto - Junior Irizarry
- Assistant - Keith Woiswillo
- Bateria - Lee Levin
- Arranger, Keyboards, Programming, Sequencing - Lester Mendez
- Trumpet - Luis Aquino
- Hammond Organ - Luis del Barrio
- Congas - Luis Dulzaides
- Arranger, Producer - Luis Romero
- Co-Coordinator, Engineer, Producer - Manny Benito
- Electric Guitar - Manny López
- Assistant Engineer - Marcelo Añez
- Piano - Marino Morales
- Graphic Design - Mario Houben
- Instrumental - Miami Symphony Orchestra
- Piano - Paquito Echevarria
- Trombone - Raffi Torres
- Harmonica - Randy Singer
- Assistant - Ricky Blanco
- Engineer - Roy Taylor
- Engineer - Rubén Martín
- Bajo Sexto - Sal Cuevas
- Congas - Sammy García
- Photography - Sixto Nolasco
- Engineer - Ted Stein
- Trumpet - Tony Concepcion
- Assistant - Tony Martini
- Editorial - Warner Chappell
- Trumpet - Ángel "Angie" Machado
- Baritone Saxophone, Tenor Saxophone - Ángel Torres
