= Al Norte del Sur =

Studio album by Franco De Vita
- Released: 1988
- Recorded: 1987–88
- Genre: Latin pop
- Label: CBS Records
- Producers: Alvaro Falcón & Franco De Vita

Franco De Vita chronology
Fantasía (1986)	Al Norte del Sur (1988)	Extranjero (1990)

Al Norte del Sur (North of South) is a 1988 studio album by Franco De Vita, released on the CBS Records label. The album produced four hit singles: "Louis", "Te Amo", "Promesas", and "Esta Vez". All four singles reached the top 10 on the Billboard Latin music charts in the United States.

== Track listing ==
- All songs written by Franco De Vita.
1. "Te Equivocaste Conmigo" 5:05
2. "Louis" 5:23
3. "Te Amo" 3:45
4. "Un Poco De Respeto" 3:45
5. "Aun Vivo" 3:42
6. "Soy Como Soy" 4:05
7. "Promesas" 4:13
8. "Esta Vez" 3:50
9. "Loco De Atar" 3:51
10. "Plaza De Centro" 4:15
11. "Al Norte Del Sur" 2:35

== Charts ==
Chart (1989)	Peak position
US Latin Pop Albums (Billboard)	6
