= Voces a mi Alrededor =

Studio album by Franco De Vita
- Released: November 16, 1993
- Recorded: 1992–93
- Genre: Pop
- Label: Sony Music

Franco De Vita chronology
En Vivo Marzo 16 (1992)	Voces a mi Alrededor (1993)	Fuera de Este Mundo (1996)

Voces a mi Alrededor (Voices Around Me) is the fifth album by Franco De Vita, recorded 1992. It was released on January 1, 1993, on the Sony label. The track, "Cálido y Frío," was a top-ten hit on the Billboard Latin music charts. Other hits from the album include "Y Te Pienso" and "Los Hijos de la Oscuridad".

== Track listing ==
1. Que no muera la esperanza
2. Mi amigo Sebastián
3. Y Te Pienso
4. Cálido y Frío (acoustic version)
5. Con un poco de ti
6. Voces a mi alrededor
7. Cálido y Frío (pop version)
8. Sin tanto espacio
9. La misma persona
10. Los Hijos De La Oscuridad
11. Otoño
