= No Basta =

Single by Franco De Vita

from the album Extranjero
- Released: 1990
- Recorded: 1989–1990
- Studio: AndieSonido (Caracas, Venezuela); International Sound Studio (Miami, Florida)
- Genre: Latin pop · Latin ballad
- Length: 4:33
- Label: Discos CBS International
- Songwriter: Franco De Vita
- Producer: Franco De Vita · Álvaro Falcón

Franco De Vita singles chronology
| "Promesas" (1990) | "No Basta" (1990) | "Ya Lo He Vivido" (1991) |

"No Basta" (English: It's Not Enough) is a song written, produced and performed by Italo-Venezuelan singer-songwriter Franco De Vita. It was released by CBS Discos and as the first single from Franco De Vita's studio album Extranjero (1990), becoming his first number-one single in the Billboard Top Latin Songs chart. The song "conveys a poignant message about children needing love, not just material possessions." The music video recorded for the song earned the International Viewer's Choice Award at the 1991 MTV Video Music Awards. The singer decided to donate the award to a campaign against discrimination in the United States. The video won a Billboard Video Music Award for Latin Video of the Year by a Male Artist.

The song debuted in the Billboard Top Latin Songs chart (formerly Hot Latin Tracks) chart at number 26 in the week of February 9, 1991, climbing to the top ten three weeks later. "No Basta" peaked at number-one on March 30, 1991, replacing "Sopa de Caracol" by Honduran musical ensemble Banda Blanca and being succeeded by "Mi Deseo" by Mexican band Los Bukis, six weeks later. "No Basta" ended 1991 as the eighth best performing Latin single of the year in the United States.

== See also ==
- List of number-one Billboard Hot Latin Tracks of 1991
- Billboard Top Latin Songs Year-End Chart
