= Sie7e =

Puerto Rican singer-songwriter

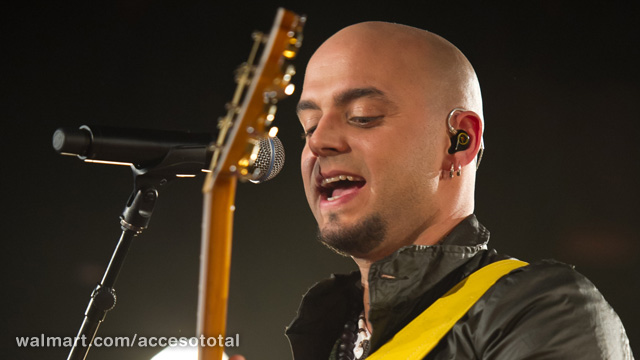

Background information
- Birth name: David Rodríguez Labault
- Born: July 26, 1977 (age 48)
- Origin: Bayamón, Puerto Rico
- Occupation(s): Singer, songwriter
- Years active: 2005–present
- Labels: Duars Entertainment
- Website: sie7emusic.com

David Rodríguez Labault (born July 26, 1977) is a Latin Grammy winning Puerto Rican singer and songwriter who performs under the stage name Siete (usually stylized as Sie7e).

== Career ==
David Rodríguez Labault, known as Sie7e by his birth date, studied sound engineering in the United States, while collaborating with several music projects. After returning to Puerto Rico, he started working in advertising.

In 2005, he decided to dedicate himself to music, releasing his first eponymous album the following year. Beyond that, he has released two more albums, the last one being Mucha Cosa Buena, in 2011. Sie7e was first signed by Universal Music, but in 2011, he signed with Warner Music Latina.

Rodríguez has a wife, Jessica, and a son, Jai.

On November 10, 2011 he won the Latin Grammy for Best New Artist.

== Discography ==
- Sie7e (2006)
- Para Mí (2008)
- Mucha Cosa Buena (2011)
- Relax (2014)
- Yo Tengo Tu Love (2011)
- Gaia (2020)
- Origami (2023)
