= Extranjero =

Studio album by Franco De Vita
- Released: 1990
- Recorded: 1989–1990
- Genre: Pop
- Label: CBS Records

Franco De Vita chronology
Al Norte del Sur (1988)	Extranjero (1990)	En Vivo Marzo 16 (1992)

Extranjero (Foreign) is the fourth studio album by Venezuelan singer Franco De Vita released on the CBS Records label. The CD produced three singles, most notably the critically acclaimed "No Basta," which spent four weeks at No. 1 on the Billboard Latin music charts in the United States. Other singles from the album included "Ya Lo He Vivido" and "Será."

== Track listing ==
All the songs written and composed by Franco De Vita.

No.	Title	Length
1.	"Ella Está Loca Por Mí"	3:41
2.	"No Basta"	4:33
3.	"Latino"	4:31
4.	"Será"	4:48
5.	"Esto Es América"	5:02
6.	"Sexo"	3:52
7.	"Ya Lo He Vivido"	3:41
8.	"Nada Que No Me Guste A Mi"	3:41
9.	"Ella Es Única"	4:15
10.	"Extranjero"	6:12

== Charts ==
Chart (1991)	Peak position
US Latin Pop Albums (Billboard)	3
