= El Guero Y Su Banda Centenario =

Duranguense band (2004–)

El Guero Y Su Banda Centenario was a Mexican band that primarily played and created duranguense music. The band was started by El Guero, Jorge Hernandez, in 2004 after moving from Wisconsin to San Antonio Texas to embark on his musical career with Javier Gomez, Jesus Garza and Daniel Zapata. In 2004 the band signed on with a record label, A.R.C Discos.

== Members ==
- El Guero (Jorge Hernandez) – lead singer and songwriter
- Daniel Zapata – keyboardist and tuba player
- Jorge Gomez – drummer
- Jesus Garza – second keyboardist

== Discography ==
=== Albums ===
- Antes Y Despues (2008)
- Se Nos Murio El Amor (2009)
- Enamorate De Mi (2010)

=== Singles ===
- "Una Vez Mas" (2007)
- "Muero de Amor" (2009)
- "Por Lo Mucho Que Te Amo" (2010)
- "Quitate La Venda" (2011)
- "Esperando Tu Regreso" (2012)

== Grammy awards and nominations ==
The band received three Grammy nominations over the course of their career.

- Se Nos Murio El Amor (52nd Annual Grammy Awards, Best Band Album, nominated)
- Enamorate De Mi (53rd Annual Grammy Awards, Best Band Album, won)
- Estare mejor (52nd Annual Grammy Awards, Best Band Album, nominated)

== Billboard Top 100 ==
El Guero Y Su Banda Centenario had four songs make the Billboard Top 100 in the 8 year span they had as a group. Songs to make the list were:

- "Antes" (September 2008)
- "Se Nos Murios El Amor" (July 2009)
- "Ven Tu" (February 2009)
- "Quitate La Venda" (September 2011)
