= En Vivo Marzo 16 =

Live album by Franco De Vita
- Released: 1992
- Recorded: March 16 and 17, 1991
- Genre: Pop
- Label: Sony Music

Franco De Vita chronology
Extranjero (1990)	En Vivo Marzo 16 (1992)	Voces a mi Alrededor (1993)

En Vivo Marzo 16 is a 1992 album by Franco De Vita released on the Sony label. The album is a concert recording made in Caracas, Venezuela, De Vita's birthplace. The title refers to the date of the recording on March 16, 1991. Two studio cuts were included on the disc: One of them, "No Lo Había Pensado," became a chart hit.

== Track listing ==
1. Introducción/Latino
2. Te Equivocaste Conmigo
3. Aqui Estás Otra Vez
4. Esta Vez
5. Somos Tres
6. Te Amo
7. Será
8. Fantasía
9. Louis
10. Sólo Importas Tú
11. Un Buen Perdedor
12. No Hay Cielo
13. Sexo
14. No Basta
15. No Lo Había Pensado
16. Entre Tu Vida Y La Mía

== Charts ==
Chart (1992)	Peak position
US Latin Pop Albums (Billboard)	22
