= Alex, Jorge y Lena =

- Origin: Miami, United States
- Genres: Pop, Latin pop
- Years active: 2010–present
- Label: Warner
- Members: Lena Burke; Álex Ubago; Jorge Villamizar
- Website: www.alexjorgeylena.com

Alex, Jorge y Lena is a Latin supergroup, formed in 2010, that consists of singer-songwriters and multi-instrumentalists Lena Burke, Álex Ubago and Jorge Villamizar. Their sound is influenced by all three members, who played instruments and wrote all the tracks on their debut album, Alex, Jorge y Lena, which was released in September 2010. The songs on the album are mostly about love and relationships. The first single, "Estar Contigo", charted in the United States.

Villamizar is better known as the lead member of the band Bacilos and as a songwriter for various artists. Ubago and Burke had solo careers before joining the project, which is intended to be short-lived to allow the members to continue with their individual careers. Alex, Jorge y Lena has received nominations for the Lo Nuestro and a Latin Grammy Awards.

== Background ==
Alex, Jorge y Lena consists of Cuban singer-songwriter Lena Burke, Spanish performer Álex Ubago and Colombian lyricist Jorge Villamizar. In 2004, Villamizar and Ubago met at the Viña del Mar International Song Festival in Chile. The following year Villamizar was introduced to Burke in Miami. While promoting an album there in 2006, Burke met Ubago. Since then, the three musicians have maintained a close relationship. In 2009, Villamizar and Burke recorded some songs together for a new project, and because of their mutual friendship, they decided to include Ubago. The newly formed ensemble was presented to Warner Music, which welcomed it enthusiastically. Villamizar described their collaboration: "This is not a band, it is a songwriters union. We are performers and each one has a career, but we wanted to record this album together."

== Recording and release ==
Alex, Jorge y Lena "Estar Contigo" (2010)
A sample of "Estar Contigo", a ballad written by Álex Ubago which was released as their first single.

Alex, Jorge y Lena's debut album, Alex, Jorge y Lena was produced by Mexican singer-songwriter Aureo Baqueiro. Burke, Ubago and Villamizar wrote all the songs on the album. Ubago said that the album includes 12 tracks since they had a lot of material to choose from, "everything was very fluid, we felt the chemistry and also the stars lined up." Each member played an instrument; Villamizar and Ubago played guitar and Burke played piano.

Alex, Jorge y Lena was released on September 21, 2010, and peaked at number 13 in the Billboard Latin Pop Albums and 17 at the Mexican Albums Chart. Alex, Jorge y Lena held a promotional tour in Spain and Latin America.

== Singles and videos ==
"Estar Contigo" ("Being With You")" was the first single to be released from the album. It was written by Ubago and was originally recorded by him and Burke. The track was released to radio on July 26, 2010, and peaked at number 22 in the Billboard Top Latin Songs chart. About the song, Villamizar said: "When I heard the song with their voices, I said 'I do not sing' ". Then they sent the recording to the label, who immediately asked, "Where's Jorge?" and returned the song to be completed by the trio. This changed the nature of the song; according to Gabriela Martinez, Vice President of Marketing at Warner Music Latina, "Estar Contigo" "went from being a song [about a] romantic couple, a love song, [to one] may be between father and son or friends, every relationship is applied."

"La Canción del Pescado" ("The Fish Song") was the second single from the album and was released in April 2011. The track peaked at number 37 in the Billboard Latin Pop Airplay chart.

In July 2011 "Las Cosas Que Me Encantan" ("The Things I Love") and "Si Ya No Tengo Tu Corazón" ("If I Do Not Have Your Heart") were released as the third and fourth singles from the album, respectively. Alex, Jorge y Lena recorded a music video for "Si Ya No Tengo Tu Corazón" during a live concert in Mexico City as a part of their promotional tour. The video for "Las Cosas Que Me Encantan" was also recorded in Mexico City; and included additional footage from their live performance at the Festival Valladolid in Spain.

== Awards and accolades ==
The trio received a nomination for Breakthrough Artist at the Lo Nuestro Awards in 2011, which they lost to Jencarlos Canela. At the award show, Alex, Jorge y Lena performed "Estar Contigo". On September 14, 2011, Alex, Jorge y Lena received two Latin Grammy Award nominations, for Album of the Year and Best Pop Album by a Duo or Group with Vocals for their 2010 release, with an additional nomination for Aureo Baqueiro as Producer of the Year for his work on the album.

Award	Date of ceremony	Category	Recipients and nominees	Result
Lo Nuestro Awards	February 17, 2011	Breakthrough Artist	Alex, Jorge y Lena	Nominated
Latin Grammy Awards	November 10, 2011	Album of the Year	Alex, Jorge y Lena	Nominated
Latin Grammy Awards	November 10, 2011	Best Pop Album by a Duo or Group with Vocals	Alex, Jorge y Lena	Won
Lo Nuestro Awards	February 16, 2012	Pop Group or Duo of the Year	Alex, Jorge y Lena	Nominated
Premios Oye!	February 2012	Breakthrough Artist	Alex, Jorge y Lena	Nominated

== Discography ==
- Alex, Jorge y Lena (2010)
