= Fantasía (Franco De Vita album) =

Studio album by Franco De Vita
- Released: 1986
- Recorded: 1985–86
- Genre: Pop
- Label: Sonográfica

Franco De Vita chronology
Franco De Vita (1984)	Fantasía (1986)	Al Norte Del Sur (1988)

Fantasía (Fantasy) is the second studio album by Venezuelan pop singer Franco De Vita released on the Sonotone label in 1986. The CD produced tree hit singles: the title song, "Aquí Estás Otra Vez" and "Solo Importas Tú". The latter was used as the theme to La Dama de Rosa, a 1987 popular telenovela.

== Track listing ==
1. "Fantasía"
2. "Aquí Estás Otra Vez"
3. "Como Quedo Yo"
4. "Descansa Tu Amor en Mí"
5. "Frívola"
6. "No Hace Falta Decirlo"
7. "Descúbreme"
8. "Lo Que Espero De Ti"
9. "Mi Buen Amigo"
10. "Solo Importas Tú"

== Charts ==
Chart (1987)	Peak position
US Latin Pop Albums (Billboard)	4
