= Stop (Franco De Vita album) =

Studio album by Franco De Vita
- Released: May 4, 2004
- Recorded: 2003–04
- Genre: Latin pop
- Length: 37:01
- Label: Sony Music Latin
- Producer: Pedro Alfonso

Franco De Vita chronology
Segundas partes también son buenas (2002)	Stop (2004)	Mil y Una Historias En Vivo (2006)

Stop is the ninth album by Franco De Vita released on April 28, 2004. The first hit single was "Tú De Qué Vas", which reached No. 3 on Billboard Hot Latin Tracks and No. 1 Latin Pop Airplay. "Ay Dios" and "Si La Ves", a collaboration with Sin Bandera, were also released as singles, with the latter also hitting the Top 10 in Billboard. The album earned a Latin Grammy Award nomination for Best Male Pop Vocal Album.

== Track listing ==
1. "Ay Dios" - 5:04
2. "Rosa o Clavel" - 3:51
3. "Si La Ves" with Sin Bandera - 4:09
4. "No Me Lastimes" - 4:28
5. "Tú de Qué Vas" - 4:01
6. "Vamos al Grano" - 3:22
7. "No Sé lo Que Me Das" - 4:04
8. "Dónde Está el Amor" - 4:11
9. "Un Extraño En Mi Bañera" - 3:53

== Charts ==
Chart (2004)	Peak position
US Top Latin Albums (Billboard)	7
US Latin Pop Albums (Billboard)	2
US Heatseekers Albums (Billboard)	19

== Sales and certifications ==
Region	Certification	Certified units/sales
Mexico (AMPROFON)	2× Platinum+Gold	250,000^{^}
Venezuela (AVINPRO)	3× Platinum	35,000
^{^} Shipments figures based on certification alone.
