= Lena Burke =

Cuban singer-songwriter

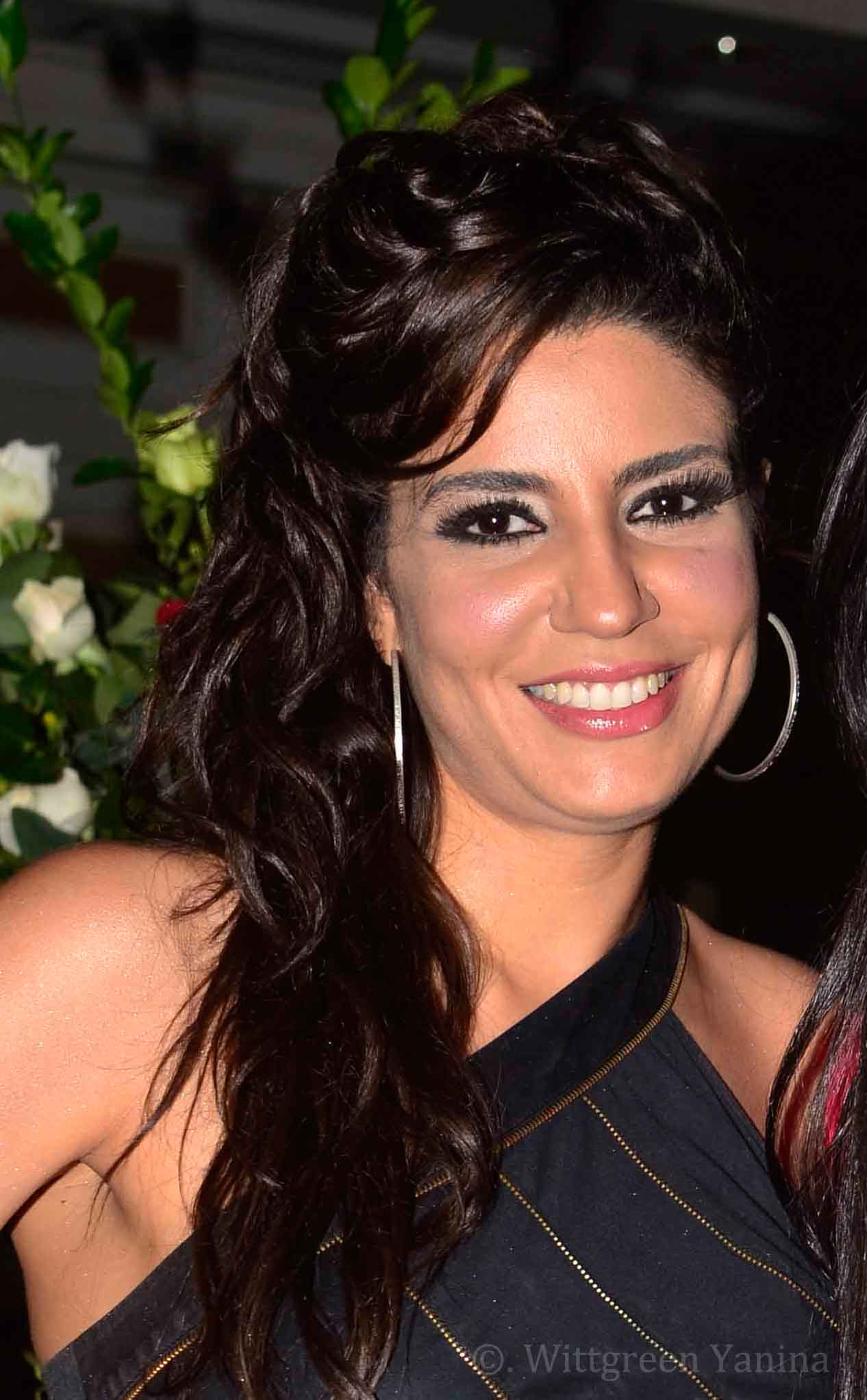
- Born: Lena Pérez; February 18, 1978 (age 48); Havana, Cuba.
- Other name: Lena Burke
- Occupations: Pianist; singer-songwriter; actress
- Musical career
- Genres: Latin ballad
- Instruments: Vocals; piano
- Years active: 2005–present
- Website: www.lenaburke.com

Lena Burke, also known as Lena Pérez or simply Lena (February 18, 1978, in Havana, Cuba) is a Cuban singer-songwriter.

== Biography ==
She is the oldest daughter of Malena Burke and granddaughter of Elena Burke. She wrote her first songs at age 3, followed by guitar classes at age 5 by her father (Rey Nerio), and classical piano at age 7. After 12 years of studio recording, Burke becomes a concert pianist, winning several prizes. At this point her voice was discovered.

Burke learned to play guitar and classical piano as a child. Burke started her musical career singing backing vocals on albums by Gloria Estefan, Julio Iglesias, Jennifer Lopez, Thalía, Jaci Velasquez, Chayanne and Alejandro Sanz. Sanz introduced Burke to executives at his label, who signed her. Her debut single, "Tu Corazón", a duet with Sanz, received a Latin Grammy nomination for Song of the Year. Her second album La Mala was released in 2008.

She participated in the chorus of many important productions: Plácido Domingo, Chayanne, Alejandro Sanz, Jennifer Lopez, Gloria Estefan, Julio Iglesias among others. In 2010, Burke joined Alex Ubago and Jorge Villamizar on the trio Alex, Jorge y Lena.

== Discography ==
Lena (2005)
First record of Lena that came out in 2005 with the successful first single "Tu Corazón" a pop ballad recorded with the Spanish singer-songwriter Alejandro Sanz, after this releasing two other not so successful singles "Puedo Jurarlo" and "Que Seria De Mi", the album have a little quiet success, but was praised by critics due to the lyrics and voice of Lena.

Track list:

- Arrepentido
- Tu Corazón (feat. Alejandro Sanz)
- Que te perdone Dios
- Amanecerte la Vida
- Viejos Tiempos
- Sígueme
- Que sería de mi
- Puedo jurarlo
- Ororeiya
- Ven y ...
- Noche como esta
- Eterna pasajera

La Mala (2009)

Soundtrack of the first film released with Lena acting, "La Mala" a biographic film about the famous Cuban singer La Lupe, Lena released this soundtrack and movie in 2009 which contains 9 song covers of La Lupe with one of them featuring with Yotuel from the Cuban rap group Orishas, 3 original songs written by Lena and a cover of the famous jazz song Fever in Spanish and featuring the reggaeton singer Tito El Bambino

Track list:

- La Tirana
- Que Te Pedi
- Fever (feat. Tito El Bambino)
- Puro Teatro
- Con El Diablo En El Cuerpo (feat. Yotuel from Orishas)
- Yo No Lloro Mas
- Si Vuelves Tu
- Porque Asi Tenia Que Ser
- Que Te Pedi [Acoustic]
- Que Puedo Hacer
- Cosas De La Vida
- Rumbon (Basado En "Yo No LLoro Mas")

Alex, Jorge y Lena (2010)

With this compilation project, Lena made a comeback in the music industry with Spanish singer Alex Ubago and the ex-Bacilos member, Colombia's Jorge Villamizar forming this new project titled "Alex, Jorge y Lena". Their first single was "Estar Contigo." In 2011 the trio was nominated for a Premio Lo Nuestro for Best Breakout Group or Duo. They also performed "Estar Contigo" during the ceremony.

Track list:

- La Cancion Del Pescado
- Mil Maneras De Querer
- Estar Contigo
- Quien
- Las Cosas Que Me Encantan
- Ya Sabes Como Soy
- Si Ya No Tengo Tu Corazon
- Versos De Amor
- A La Vuelta De La Esquina
- Huella
- Sobre El Suelo Mojado
- Mas Na' Contigo
