= Franco De Vita =

Venezuelan recording artist; singer-songwriter

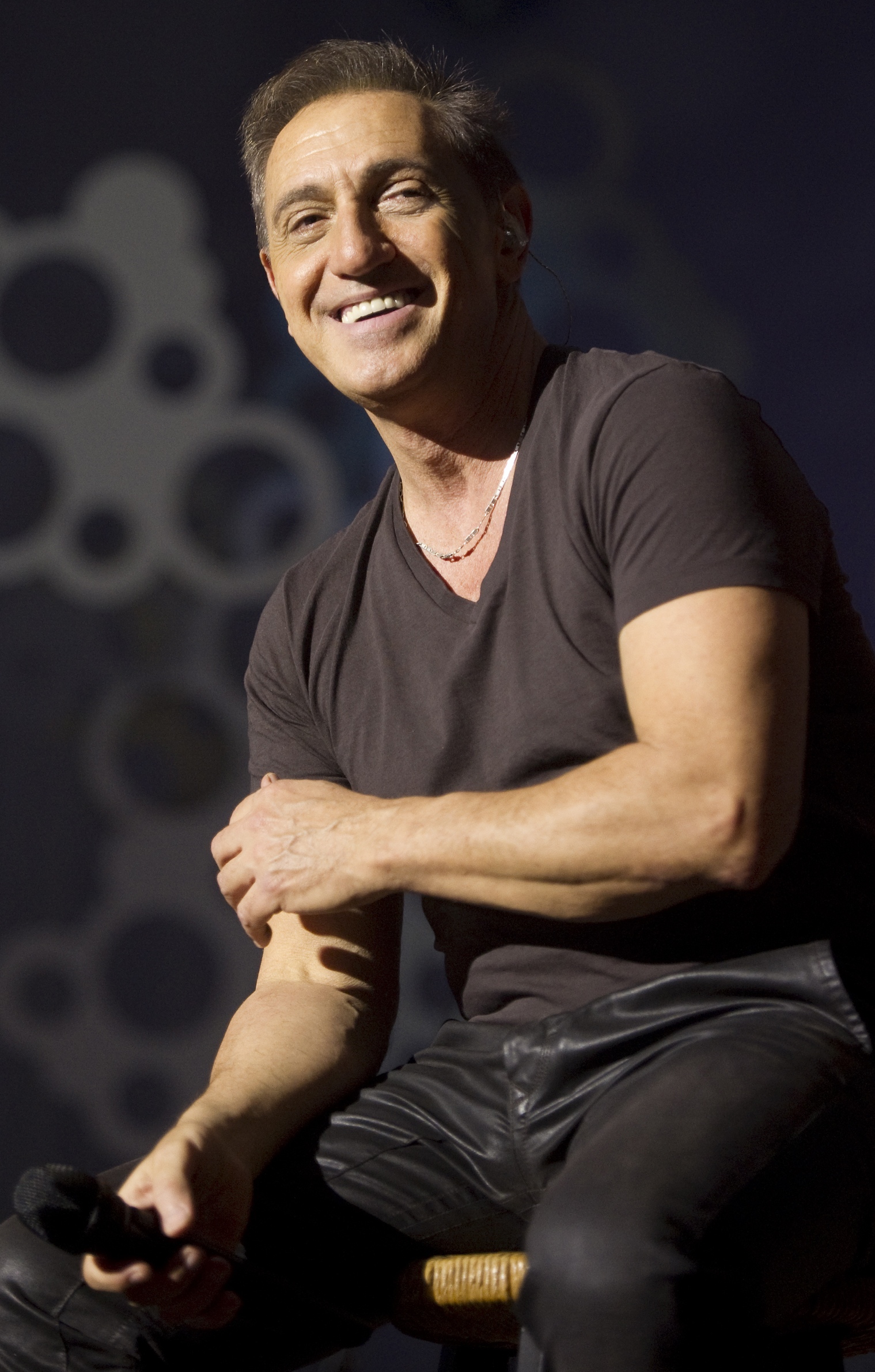
- De Vita in 2011

Background information
- Born: January 23, 1954 (age 72)
- Origin: Caracas, Venezuela
- Genres: Latin pop; rock
- Occupations: Singer-songwriter
- Years active: 1982–present
- Labels: Sonográfica, CBS Records, Sony Music
- Website: francodevita.com

Franco Atilio De Vita De Vito (born January 23, 1954) is a Venezuelan Latin Grammy award-winning singer-songwriter. His first album as a solo artist garnered three Spanish-language hits in Venezuela. He signed with the CBS Records label in 1989, and in 1990, his album Extranjero had a song that reached No. 1 on the United States Latin charts and won an MTV Video Music Award. His 2004 album Stop reached the Top 10 throughout Latin America and on the United States Latin charts. In the United States alone, he has scored more than two dozen hits on the Billboard charts.

== Career ==
=== 1980s ===
De Vita was born in Caracas, Venezuela, one of four children born in Venezuela to Italian immigrants, De Vita returned to Rome, Italy with his family when he was three years old. The family moved back to Venezuela when De Vita was 13. Due to his upbringing in Rome, Italy, De Vita learned Italian as his first language and did not learn Spanish until he returned to Venezuela at age 13. He later studied piano at the university level. In 1982, De Vita formed the group Icaro, which released one self-titled album in his homeland. Two years later, he released his first disc as a solo artist, simply titled Franco De Vita (1984). The album spun off three Spanish-language hits: "Somos Tres", "No Hay Cielo", and "Un Buen Perdedor". His 1986 in album Fantasía produced several more hits, including the title song and "Aquí Estás Otra Vez". "Sólo Importas Tú", taken from the album, was used as the theme song to the Spanish-language soap opera La Dama De Rosa. He appeared in the end credits of every episode, performing the song at the piano.

Seeking wider international exposure, De Vita moved to the CBS Records label for the 1988 album Al Norte del Sur. The album showed his socially conscious, adult-oriented pop, particularly through the tunes "Te Amo" and "Louis". The latter song, about a daydreaming cabbie who idolizes The Beatles, was promoted with a music video considered quite advanced for its time. De Vita's 1990 album Extranjero featured the song "No Basta", which spent four weeks at No. 1 on the United States Latin charts and won an MTV Video Music Award.

=== 1990s ===
Subsequent albums have included the live release En Vivo Marzo 16 (1992); Voces a mi Alrededor in 1993; the acoustic-flavored Fuera de Este Mundo (1996); and 1999's world-beat inspired Nada Es Igual. He left Sony for the 2002 album Segundas partes también son buenas, but returned to the label the following year.

=== 2000s ===
His 2004 album Stop reached the Top 10 throughout Latin America and on the United States Latin charts, spurred by the hits "Tú De Qué Vas" and "Si La Ves," the latter a collaboration with pop group Sin Bandera. That same year, he toured arenas in the United States on a co-headlining tour with Ricardo Montaner, a fellow Venezuelan songwriter. He also has recorded in Italian and Portuguese. As a songwriter, he has written songs for Ricky Martin and Chayanne.

In 2005, an expanded edition of Stop was released, titled Stop + Algo Más, that included remixes and live recordings, as well as No Sé Lo Que Me Das, De Vita's first recording in English. The following year saw the release of Mil y Una Historias En Vivo, a two-disc live album that also featured four studio tracks, including collaborations with Alejandro Fernández and Diego El Cigala. A DVD version was released simultaneously.

In 2007, De Vita collaborated on a single with reggaeton duo Wisin & Yandel called "Oye Donde Esta El Amor", which borrowed the chorus from his composition "Donde Esta El Amor." They released an updated version of "Un Buen Perdedor" that peaked at No. 2 on the Billboard Hot Latin Songs chart. In 2008, he re-recorded "Que No Muera La Esperanza" (originally featured on Voces A Mi Alrededor) with Wisin & Yandel, as well as releasing a new studio album, Simplemente La Verdad. He was also presented with the ASCAP Latin Heritage Award.

=== 2010s ===
In 2012, De Vita appeared on Tony Bennett's album Viva Duets. He was named Pop Artist of the Year at the 2012 Pepsi Venezuela Music Awards. In 2014, De Vita was inducted into the Billboard Latin Music Hall of Fame.

On January 30, 2014, the "Tour Mexico 2014" began in San Luis Potosí, which toured eight cities in Mexico and is part of his new musical tour entitled "Vuelve en Primera fila Tour".

=== Personal life ===
De Vita has lived in Madrid since the 1990s. In addition to Spanish and Italian, he also speaks English.

== Spanish-language discography ==
- Franco De Vita (1984)
- Fantasía (1986)
- Al Norte Del Sur (1988)
- Extranjero (1990)
- En Vivo Marzo 16 (1992)
- Voces a mi Alrededor (1993)
- Fuera de Este Mundo (1996)
- Nada Es Igual (1999)
- Segundas partes también son buenas (2002)
- Stop (2004)
- Stop + Algo Más (2005)
- Mil y Una Historias En Vivo (2006)
- Simplemente La Verdad (2008)
- En Primera Fila (2011)
- Vuelve en Primera Fila (2013)
- Libre (2016)

(excludes compilations)

== Non-Spanish discography ==
- 1993 Straniero (Italian)
- 1993 Isto é America (Portuguese)

== See also ==
- List of best-selling Latin music artists
