= Latin Grammy Award for Best Engineered Album =

Award for recorded works

- Awarded for: engineering for an album
- Country: United States
- Presented by: The Latin Recording Academy
- First award: 2000
- Currently held by: Jack Lahana, Jack Lahana and Bernie Grundman for Cancionera (2025)
- Website: latingrammy.com/en

The Latin Grammy Award for Best Engineered Album is given every year since the 1st Latin Grammy Awards ceremony in 2000 which took place at the Staples Center in Los Angeles, California. The first winner in the category was Juan Luis Guerra's Ni Es Lo Mismo Ni Es Igual, with Carlos Álvarez, Mike Couzzi, Bolívar Gómez, Miguel Hernández, Luis Mansilla, Carlos Ordehl, Eric Ramos, July Ruiz and Eric Schilling receiving the award.

The category at the 2020 Latin Grammy Awards is defined as being "for newly recorded albums released for the first time during the current eligibility year." Eligible for the award are "credited recording engineer(s), mixing engineer(s) and mastering engineer(s)." The performing artist of the album does not receive the award or nominations unless they are also a recording engineer, mixer or mastering engineer.

Out of all the winners in this category, six of them have also been nominated for Album of the Year (Ni Es Lo Mismo Ni Es Igual (2000), MTV Unplugged (2005), Dear Diz (Every Day I Think of You) (2012), Hasta la Raíz (2015), Mis Planes Son Amarte (2017) and El Madrileño (2021)) while five of them have won both awards (No Es Lo Mismo (2004), Fijación Oral Vol. 1 (2006), La Llave de mi Corazón (2007), El Mal Querer (2019), Motomami (2022) and Lux (Complete Works) (2026), the latter three being by Rosalía.

== Recipients ==
Year	Recipients(s)	Work	Performing artist(s)	Nominees Performers are in parentheses	Ref.
2000	Carlos Álvarez, Mike Couzzi, Bolívar Gómez, Miguel Hernández, Luis Mansilla, Carlos Ordehl, Eric Ramos, July Ruiz and Eric Schilling	Ni Es Lo Mismo Ni Es Igual	Juan Luis Guerra	Frank Filipetti – Abre (Fito Páez); Jerry Boys – Buena Vista Social Club Presents Ibrahim Ferrer (Ibrahim Ferrer); Antonio "Moogie" Canazio – João Gilberto Voz e Violão (João Gilberto); Joe Chiccarelli & Aníbal Kerpel – Revés/Yo Soy (Café Tacuba)	
2001	Marcelo Anez, Gustavo Celis, Gordon Chinn, Charles Dye, Javier Garza, Mike Gouzauski, Sebastian Krys, Freddy Pinero, Jr., Eric Schilling, Joel Someilan, Ron Taylor, J. C. Ulloa and Robb Williams	Arrasando	Thalía	Luca Bignardi, Steve Churchyard, David Cole, Rupert Coulson, Jon Jacobs, Luis Quiñe, Ben "Jammin" Robbins and Ali Thomson – Entre tú y mil mares (Laura Pausini); Duda, Marcelo Loud, Sergio Ricardo and Luiz Paulo Serafim – Gil y Milton (Gilberto Gil and Milton Nascimento); Juan Ignacio Cuadrado and Fredy Marugan – Los Paraísos Desiertos (Ismael Serrano); Moogie Canazio and Marcelo Sabóia – Noites Do Norte (Caetano Veloso)	
2002	Andrés Bermúdez, Joel Numa and Silvio Richetto	Alexandre Pires	Alexandre Pires	Jon Fausty – Cambio De Tiempo (Vocal Sampling); Jorge "Mosquito" Garrido, Facundo Rodríguez, Ricardo Troilo and Alvaro Villagra – Lerner Vivo (Alejandro Lerner); Moogie Canazio – Sandy & Junior (Sandy & Junior); Gerónimo Labrada, Jr. and X-Alfonso – X-Moré (X-Alfonso)	
2003	Benny Faccone and Paul McKenna	Revolución de Amor	Maná	Mike Couzzi and Sebastian Krys – Money Pa' Que (Los Rabanes); Walter Flores, Oscar Marín, Daniela Pastore and Edín Solís – Mundo (Rubén Blades); William Jr., Antoine Midani and Alê Siqueira – Tribalistas (Tribalistas); Rolando Alejandro, Dominic Barbera, Jon Fausty, Brian Kinkead, José Lugo, Arturo Ortiz, Rei Peña, Pedro Rivera Toledo and Ronnie Torres – Viceversa (Gilberto Santa Rosa)	
2004	Mick Guzauski, Pepo Sherman and Rafa Sardina	No Es Lo Mismo	Alejandro Sanz	Moogie Canazio and Gabriel Pinheiro – Brasileirinho (Maria Bethânia); Pepe Loeches – Lágrimas Negras (Bebo Valdés and Diego El Cigala); Álvaro Alencar and Tom Capone – Maria Rita (Maria Rita); Eric Schilling, Al Schmit and Armin Steiner – Trumpet Evolution (Arturo Sandoval)	
2005	Gustavo Borner	MTV Unplugged	Diego Torres	Chuy Flores and Jack Sáenz III – X (Intocable); Seth Atkins, Javier Garza, Cruz "CK" Martínez and Robert "Bobbo" Gómez III – Fuego (Kumbia Kings); Robert Carranza, Serban Ghenea and Anton Pukshansky – Street Signs (Ozomatli); Antonio Cortes – Velvetina (Miguel Bosé)	
2006	Gustavo Celis, Serban Ghenea, Mauricio Guerrero, Rob Jacobs, Kevin Killen and Dave Way (engineers); Vlado Meller (mastering engineer)	Fijación Oral Vol. 1	Shakira	Valerio Calisse, Hernan Gatica, Humberto Gatica, Pierpaolo Guerrini, Alejandro Rodríguez and Jochen van der Saag (engineers); Vlado Meller (mastering engineer) – Amore (Andrea Bocelli); Cotô Guarino, Swami Junior and André "K-belo" Sangiácomo (engineers); Carlos Freitas (mastering engineer) – De Uns Tempos Pra Cá (Chico César); Duda Mello (engineer); Carlos Freitas (mastering engineer) – Jet - Samba (Marcos Valle); José Luis Crespo, Sancho Gómez Escobar and Joaquín Pizarro (engineer); Jesús N. Gómez (mastering engineer) – La Vida Moderna (Pastora)	
2007	Allan Leschhorn, Luis Mansilla and Ronnie Torres (engineer); Adam Ayan (mastering engineer)	La Llave de mi Corazón	Juan Luis Guerra	Mario Breuer, Gustavo "Pichon" Dal Pont and Javier Garza (engineers); Giovanni Versari (mastering engineer) – A Tu Lado (Juan Fernando Velasco); Álvaro Alencar (engineers); Ricardo Garcia (mastering engineer) – Acústico MTV (Lenine); Jay Ashby and Jay Dudt (engineers); Jay Dudt and Hollis Greathouse (mastering engineer) – Especiaria (Flavio Chamis); Gil Cerezo, Carlos Chairez, Omar Gongora, Ulises Lozano and Cesar Pliego (engineers); Gil Cerezo, Carlos Chairez, Omar Gongora, Ulises Lozano and Cesar Pliego (mastering engineer) – Reina (Kinky)	
2008	Moogie Canazio (engineer); Moogie Canazio and Luiz Tornaghi (mastering engineers)	Dentro Do Mar Tem Rio – Ao Vivo	Maria Bethânia	Humberto Gatica (engineer); Bernie Grundman (mastering engineer) – David Cavazos (David Cavazos); Gabriel Peña, Héctor Iván Rosa and Bobby Valentín (engineers); José Lugo (mastering engineer) – Evolution (Bobby Valentín); Ariel Alejandro Gato (engineer and mastering engineer) – Obra Inversa (Obra Inversa); Chris Brooke, Steve Churchyard, Humberto Gatica and Rodolfo Vazquez (engineers); Stephen Marcussen (mastering engineer) – Rhythm & Romance (Kenny G); Carlos "KK" Akamine and Al Schmitt (engineers); Doug Sax (mastering engineer) – Romance (Rosa Passos)	
2009	Dani Espinet, Micky Forteza Rey, Jose Luis Molero and Jordi Solé (engineers); Tom Backer (mastering engineer)	Orquesta Reciclando	Jarabe de Palo	Bori Alarcón, Alfonso Espadero and Javier García (engineers); Bori Alarcón (mastering engineer) – Despertar (India Martínez); Gabriel Pinheiro (engineer); Ricardo Dias (mastering engineer) – Dois Mundos (Scott Feiner & Pandeiro Jazz); Denílson Campos, Rodrigo Delacroix, Jr Tostoi (engineers); Ricardo Garcia (mastering engineer) – Labiata (Lenine); Renato Alsher, Fernando Aponte, Julio Berta, Marcos Cunha, Zé Guilherme, Caco Law, Alex Moreira and LC Varella (engineers); Carlos Freitas (mastering engineer) – Telecoteco (Paula Morelenbaum)	
2010	Paul Acedo, Rafa Arcaute, Sebastian Krys, Lee Levin, Daniel Ovie, Sebastian Perkal, Thom Russo, Esteban Varela and Dan Warner (engineers); Lurssen Inc. (mastering engineer)	Distinto	Diego Torres	Gregg Field and Don Murray (engineers); Michael Bishop (mastering engineer) – A Time For Love (Arturo Sandoval); José Amosa, Fran Ibáñez, Antonio Ruiz and Eduardo Ruiz (engineers); Eduardo Ruiz (mastering engineer) – Ruido (José Mercé); Moogie Canazio and Gabriel Pinheiro (engineers); Moogie Canazio and Luiz Tornaghi (mastering engineers) – Tua (Maria Bethânia); Jose Luis Crespo and Raul Quilez (engineers); Ian Cooper (mastering engineer) – Y. (Bebe)	
2011	Benny Faccone and Thom Russo (engineers); Tom Baker (mastering engineer)	Drama y Luz	Maná	Rafo Arbulú, Carlos Castro, Humberto Gatica, Guillermo 'Memo' Gil, Allan Leschhorn, Cristian Robles, Andrés Saavedra and Rodolfo Vázquez (engineers); Bernie Grundman (mastering engineer) – Días Nuevos (Gian Marco); Valter Costa, Beto Neves, Flávio Sena, Alê Siqueira, Flávio Souza and William Jr. (engineers); Carlos Freitas (mastering engineer) – Diminuto (Carlinhos Brown); Ricky Campanelli and Juan Cristóbal Losada (engineers); Juan Cristóbal Losada (mastering engineer) – Homenaje a Los Rumberos (Edwin Bonilla); Moogie Canazio and Brad Haenel (engineers); Ron Mc Master (mastering engineer) – Manuscrito (Claudia Brant)	
2012	Gregg Field & Don Murray (engineers); Paul Blakemore (mastering engineer)	Dear Diz (Every Day I Think of You)	Arturo Sandoval	Madre Música (engineer); André Dias (mastering engineer) – Brasilianos 3 (Hamilton de Holanda); Bruno Giorgi (engineer); Carlos Freitas (mastering engineer) – Chão (Lenine); Julio Boscher, Walter Costa, Duda Mello, Leonel Pereda & Carlos Toré (engineer); Ricardo Garcia (mastering engineer) – Liebe Paradiso (Celso Fonseca and Ronaldo Bastos); Alexandre Gaiotto (engineer and mastering engineer) – O Canto Da Sereia (Regina Benedetti)	
2013	Edgar Barrera, Sebastian de Peyrecave, Javier Garza, Julio Reyes Copello (engineers); Mike Fuller (mastering engineer)	Kany García	Kany García	Eduardo Sobral, Léo Guimarães, Roberto Jr., Luiz Carlos T Reis and Ricardo Dias (engineers) – Barra Da Saia (Karyme Hass); Carlos Campón, Ernesto García, Noah Georgeson, Demian Nava, Sebastían Schon, César Sogbe and José Blanco (engineers) – Mujer Divina – Homenaje a Agustín Lara (Natalia Lafourcade); Marcelo Sabóia and Carlos Freitas (engineers) – Rua Dos Amores (Djavan); Bori Alarcón, Sergio Delgado and Salomé Limón (engineers) – Soy Flamenco (Tomatito)	
2014	Juber Anbín, Johnnatan García, Vladimir Quintero Mora, Rodner Padilla, Eduardo Pulgar, Jean Sánchez & Alexander Vanlawren (engineers); Germán Landaeta & Darío Peñaloza (album recording engineers); Germán Landaeta (album mastering engineer)	De Repente	C4 Trío and Rafael "Pollo" Brito	Facundo Rodríguez (engineer) – Miss Delirios (Sandra Márquez); Javier Limón, Salomé Limón, Marian G. Villota and Caco Refojo (engineer) – Promesas De Tierra (Javier Limón); Roger Freret, Claudio Spiewak and Felipe Tichauer (engineer) – Rio, Choro, Jazz... (Antonio Adolfo); Juan Switalski (engineer) – 21st Century Lyrical Clarinet Concertos (Eleanor Weingartner)	
2015	Andrés Borda, Eduardo Del Águila, Alan Ortiz Grande, Demián Nava, Alan Saucedo & Sebastián Schon (engineers); Eduardo Del Águila & Cesar Sogbe (album recording engineers); José Blanco (album mastering engineer)	Hasta la Raíz	Natalia Lafourcade	Salome Limón and Caco Refojo (engineers) – Astrid Asher (Astrid Asher); Daniel Musy, Daniel Musy and Andre Dias (engineers) – Baile do Almeidinha (Hamilton de Holanda); Jonathan Allen, Rodrigo de Castro Lopes, Pete Karam and Paul Blakemore (engineers) – Made in Brazil (Eliane Elias); Otávio Carvalho and Felipe Tichauer (engineers) – Sintético (Vitrola Sintética)	
2016	Be Hussey, Gustavo Lenza, Diogo Poças & Rodrigo Sanches (engineers); Mike Cresswell (album recording engineer); Felipe Tichauer (album mastering engineer)	Tropix	Céu	Rodrigo Campello, Márcio Gama, Aurélio Kauffmann, Jon Luz, Fernando Nunes and Carlos Freitas (engineers) – Delírio (Roberta Sá); Moogie Canazio and Ron McMaster (engineers) – Like Nice (Celso Fonseca); Salomé Limón and Caco Refojo (engineers) – Magnética (María Toledo); Daniel Musy and André Dias (engineers) – Samba de Chico (Hamilton de Holanda)	
2017	Josh Gudwin (mixer); Tom Coyne (mastering engineer)	Mis Planes Son Amarte	Juanes	Guillermo Bonetto, Nahuel Giganti, My-TBeats & Pedro Pearson (engineers); Pedro Pearson (mixer and mastering engineer) – Alas Canciones (Los Cafres); Rodrigo de Castro Lopes (engineer); Pete Karam (mixer); Paul Blakemore (mastering engineer) – Dance of Time (Eliane Elias); Craig Parker Adams & Gabe Roth (engineers); Juan Pablo Berreondo & Gabe Roth (mixers); JJ Golden (master engineer) – Ilusión (Gaby Moreno); Moogie Canazio (engineer, mixer and mastering engineer); Carlos De Andrade and Ricardo Dias (mastering engineers) – Zanna (Zanna)	
2018	Rafa Sardina (engineer and mixer); Eric Boulanger (mastering engineer)	50 Años Tocando Para Ti	Orquesta Filarmónica de Bogotá	Gustavo Borner and Justin Moshkevich (engineers and mixers); Nick Baxter (mastering engineer) – Feliz (Nahuel Pennisi); Leo Bracht (engineer and mixer); Felipe Tichauer (mastering engineer) – Noturno (Anaadi); Thiago Baggio (engineer); Rodrigo Sanches (engineer, mixer and mastering engineer) – Rei Ninguém (Arthur Nogueira); Carles Campi Campón, Ernesto García & Pablo Martín Jones (engineers); Carles Campi Campón & Matías Cella (mixer); Fred Kevorkian (mastering engineer) – Salvavidas de Hielo (Jorge Drexler)	
2019	El Guincho and Brian Hernández (engineers); Jaycen Joshua (mixer); Chris Athens (mastering engineer)	El Mal Querer	Rosalía	Carlos Lima and Gilberto Monte (engineers); Carlos Lima (mixer); Carlos Lima (mastering engineer) – Anaí Rosa Atraca Geraldo Pereira (Anaí Rosa); Zac Hernández and Jerry Ordoñez (engineers); Jack Lahana (mixer); Chab (mastering engineer) – Bach (Bandalos Chinos); Roger Freret (engineer); Marcelo Sabóia (mixer); Ron McMaster (mastering engineer) – Encontros (Antonio Adolfo featuring Orquestra Atlantica); Jan Holzner, David Julca, Jonathan Julca, Jon Leone, Carlos Fernando López, Ricardo López Lalinde, Yasmil Marrufo, Darío Moscatelli, Quaz & Tainy (engineers); Jaycen Joshua (mixer); Mike Bozzi (mastering engineer) – Montaner (Ricardo Montaner)	
2020	Daniel Bitrán Arizpe, Daniel Dávila, Justin Moshkevich, George Noriega, Erick Roman, Paul Rubinstein & JC Vertti (engineers); Miles Comaskey, Najeeb Jones & Tony Maserati (mixers); Dale Becker (mastering engineer)	3:33	Debi Nova	Eduardo Del Aguila, Keith Gretlein, Julian Prindle, Curt Schneider, Sasha Sirota & Oskar Winberg (engineers); Josh Gudwin (mixer); Colin Leonard (mastering engineer) – Aire (Versión Día) (Jesse & Joy); Alexandre Fontanetti, Diogo Poças & Pupillo (engineers); Mike Cresswell (mixer); Felipe Tichauer (mastering engineer) – Apká! (Céu); Mon Dvy, Alex Ferrer, Diogo Guerra, Felipe Guevara, Innercut, Red Mojo, Stego & Filipe Survival (mixers); Alex Ferrer & Carlos Hernández Carbonell (mastering engineers) – Quimera (Alba Reche); John "Beetle" Bailey (engineer and mixer); Harry Hess (mastering engineer) – Sublime (Alex Cuba)	
2021	Orlando Aispuro Meneses, Daniel Alanís, Alizzz, Rafa Arcaute, Josdán Luis Cohimbra Acosta, Miguel De La Vega, Máximo Espinosa Rosell, Alex Ferrer, Luis Garcié, Billy Garedella, Patrick Liotard, Ed Maverick, Beto Mendonça, Jaime Navarro, Alberto Pérez, Nathan Phillips, Harto Rodríguez & Federico Vindver, (engineers); Delbert Bowers, Alex Ferrer, Jaycen Joshua, Nineteen85, Lewis Pickett, Alex Psaroudakis & Raül Refree, (mixers); Chris Athens, (mastering engineer)	El Madrileño	C. Tangana	Nelson Carvalho, engineer; Leo Aldrey & Rafael Giner, mixers; Tiago De Sousa, mastering engineer – bpm (Salvador Sobral); Roger Freret, engineer; Claudio Spiewak, mixer; André Dias, mastering engineer – Bruma: Celebrating Milton Nascimiento (Antonio Adolfo); Mauro Araújo, engineer; Andre Kassin, mixer; Carlos Freitas, mastering engineer – Iceberg (Priscila Tossan); Pepe Aguilar, Rodrigo Cuevas, José Luis Fernández, Camilo Froideval, Edson R. Heredia, Manu Jalil, Rubén López Arista, Nacho Molino, David Montuy, Lucas Nunes, Alan Ortiz Grande & Alan Saucedo, engineers; Rubén López Arista, mixer; Michael Fuller, mastering engineer – Un Canto por México, Vol. 2 (Natalia Lafourcade)	
2022	Chris Gehringer, (engineer); Jeremie Inhaber, Manny Marroquin, Zach Peraya & Anthony Vilchis, (mixers); Chris Gehringer, (mastering engineer)	Motomami (Digital Album)	Rosalía	Cesar J. De Cisneros & Érico Moreira, engineers; Érico Moreira, mixer; Felipe Tichauer, mastering engineer – Dentro da Matrix (Érico Moreira); Zé Nigro & Gustavo Ruiz, engineers; João Milliet & Rodrigo Sanches, mixers; Felipe Tichauer, mastering engineer – Indigo Borboleta Anil (Liniker); Marcelo Saboia, engineer; Marcelo Saboia, mixer; Andre Dias, mastering engineer – Jobim Forever (Antonio Adolfo); Julián Bernal, Nico Cotton, Carlitos González, Alberto Hernández, Michel Kuri, Malay, Felipe Mejía, Jv Olivier, Juan Sebastián Parra, Alejandro García Partida & Alan Saucedo, engineers; Julián Bernal, Mikaelin Bluespruce, Raúl López, Lewis Pickett & Harold Sanders, mixers; Julián Bernal & Dave Kutch, mastering engineers – ya no somos los mismos (Elsa y Elmar)	
2023	Érico Moreira, (engineer); Érico Moreira, (mixer); Felipe Tichauer, (mastering engineer)	Canto a la Imaginación	Marina Tuset	Bruno Giorgi, mixer; Randy Merrill, mastering engineer – Daramô (Tiago Iorc); Túlio Airold, Victor Amaral & Pedro Peixoto, engineers; João Milliet & Pedro Peixoto, mixers; Fili Filizzola, mastering engineer – Depois Do Fim (Lagum); Roger Freret, engineer; Marcelo Saboia, mixer; Andre Dias, mastering engineer – Octet and Originals (Antonio Adolfo); Rodrigo de Castro Lopes, engineer; Pete Karam, mixer; Paul Blakemore, mastering engineer – Quietude (Eliane Elias); Thiago Baggio, engineer; Thiago Monteiro, mixer; Thiago Monteiro, mastering engineer – Solar (Vanessa Moreno)	
2024	Thiago Baggio, Will Bone, Leonardo Emocija, Rodrigo Lemos & Felipe Vassão (engineers); João Milliet (mixer); Felipe Tichauer (mastering engineer)	Se o Meu Peito Fosse o Mundo	Jota.Pê	Tó Brandileone (engineer); Daniel Musy (mixer); André Dias (mastering engineer) – Analu (Analu Sampaio); Pedro Peixoto & Matheus Stiirmer (engineers); Pedro Peixoto (mixer); Fili Filizzola (mastering engineer) – Era Uma Vez (Mobi Colombo); Uiliam Pimenta, Julio Raposo & Pepê Santos (engineers); Bernardo Martins (mixer); Felipe Tichauer (mastering engineer) – Os Garotin De São Gonçalo (Os Garotin); Túlio Airold, Alex Dos Reis Silva & Gianlucca Pernechele Azevedo (engineers); João Milliet (mixer); Fili Filizzola (mastering engineer) – Quem É Ela? (Mariana Nolasco)	
2025	Jack Lahana (engineer); Jack Lahana (mixer); Bernie Grundman (mastering engineer)	Cancionera	Natalia Lafourcade	Isidro Acedo, Rob Bisel, Pablo Gómez Cano & Pablo López García (engineers); Lewis Pickett (mixer); Lewis Pickett (mastering engineer) – Bodhiria (Judeline); Júlio Fejuca, Daniel Mariano Gonçalves, André Malaquias, João Milliet, Gustavo Ruiz Chagas, & Eric Yoshino (engineers); João Milliet (mixer); Felipe Tichauer (mastering engineer) – Caju (Liniker); Tó Brandileone & Matheus Stiirmer (engineers); Pedro Peixoto (mixer); Fili Filizzola (mastering engineer) – Enquanto Os Distraídos Amam (Pedro Emílio); Leo Alcantara & Marcelo Saboia (engineers); Marcelo Saboia (mixer); Andre Dias (mastering engineer) – Love Cole Porter (Antonio Adolfo)	
