= 23rd Annual Latin Grammy Awards =

2022 edition of the Latin Grammy Awards

23rd Latin Grammy Awards
- Date: November 17, 2022
- Venue: Mandalay Bay Events Center, Paradise, United States
- Hosted by: Anitta, Luis Fonsi, Laura Pausini and Thalía

Highlights
- Most awards: Jorge Drexler (6)
- Most nominations: Bad Bunny (10)
- Person of the Year: Marco Antonio Solís

Television/radio coverage
- Network: TelevisaUnivision; HBO Max
- Viewership: 5.3 million

The 23rd Annual Latin Grammy Awards ceremony was held on Thursday, November 17, 2022, at the Mandalay Bay Events Center, Las Vegas to honor the best musical releases within Latin music released from June 1, 2021, to May 31, 2022. The nominations were announced via a virtual livestream on September 20, 2022, presented by Kany García, Christina Aguilera, Banda Los Sebastianes, Becky G, Yotuel, Criolo, Nicky Jam, Akapellah, Luísa Sonza, Sebastián Yatra and Camilo. The three-hour ceremony aired live on Univision and was hosted by singers Anitta, Luis Fonsi, Laura Pausini and Thalía.

In April 2022, Mexican singer and songwriter Marco Antonio Solís was named Person of the Year by the Latin Recording Academy. Singers and musicians Rosario Flores, Myriam Hernández, Rita Lee, Amanda Miguel and Yordano were honored with the Lifetime Achievement Award while Spanish singer Manolo Díaz, Cuban saxophonist Paquito D'Rivera and Mexican bassist Abraham Laboriel are this year's recipients of the Trustees Award.

Uruguayan singer Jorge Drexler and Spanish singer C. Tangana won both Record of the Year and Song of the Year for their collaboration "Tocarte". It was the second occasion which Drexler won both categories during the same night after receiving the same awards for "Telefonía" in 2018. Spanish singer Rosalía won Album of the Year for Motomami, becoming the first female artist to win the category more than once. Mexican singer Silvana Estrada and Cuban-American singer Angela Alvarez won Best New Artist in a tie. It was the first time in the history of the awards that a General Field category resulted in a tie.

== Performances ==
List of musical performances
| Artist(s) | Song(s) |
Premiere ceremony
| Fonseca | "Besos en la Frente" |
| Luis Figueroa | "Fiesta Contigo" |
| Jão | "Idiota" |
| Carín León; Matisse; Edgar Barrera | "Como lo Hice Yo" |
| Carla Morrison | "Encontrarme" |
| Bruses; Elsa y Elmar | "qué voy a hacer conmigo???" |
Main ceremony
| Thalía; Luis Fonsi; Laura Pausini; Sin Bandera; Carín León; Gente de Zona; Aymée Nuviola; Goyo | Tribute to Marco Antonio Solís "Si no te hubieras ido" "A Dónde Vamos a Parar" "Más Que Tu Amigo" |
| Rauw Alejandro | "Desesperados" "Lejos del Cielo" "Más de una Vez" "Punto 40" |
| Nicky Jam; Cultural Foundation Kids | "El Perdón" |
| Ángela Aguilar | "En Realidad" |
| Silvana Estrada; Nicole Zignago; Camilo; Carlos Vives | "Baloncito Viejo" |
| Christina Aguilera; Christian Nodal | "Cuando Me Dé la Gana" |
| Jesse & Joy | "Respirar" |
| Marc Anthony; Sergio George; Motiff | "Mala" |
| Rosalía | "Hentai" "LA FAMA" "Despechá" |
| Chiquis; Banda Los Recoditos | "Entre Besos y Copas" "Me Siento a Todo Dar" |
| Sebastián Yatra; John Legend | "Tacones Rojos" |
| Karol G | "Gatúbela" "Provenza" "Cairo" |
| Marco Antonio Solís; Mariachi Sol de México de José Hernández | "Se Veía Venir" "La Venia Bendita" |
| Romeo Santos | "Bebo" |
| Jorge Drexler; Elvis Costello | "Tocarte" |
| Anitta | "Envolver" "Funk Dance Medley" |
| Los Bukis | "Tu Cárcel" |

== Presenters ==
Premiere ceremony

- Miguel Ángel Muñoz – host
- Debi Nova – host
- Marina Sena
- Mario Quintero Lara from Los Tucanes de Tijuana
- Elena Rose
- Jão
- Edgar Barrera
- Mahmundi

Main ceremony

- Miguel Ángel Muñoz and Kany García – presented Best Salsa Album
- Macarena Achaga and Fonseca – presented Best Pop Vocal Album
- María Becerra and Luis Figueroa – presented Best New Artist
- Ludmilla and Kurt – presented Best Urban Music Album
- Adrián Uribe, Alison Solís and Marla Solís – presented Best Contemporary Tropical Album
- Georgina Rodríguez and Luisa Sonza – presented Best Traditional Pop Vocal Album
- Yalitza Aparicio and Becky G – presented Best Ranchero/Mariachi Album
- Cami and Edén Muñoz – presented Record of the Year
- Farina and Víctor Manuelle – presented Song of the Year
- Fito Páez – presented Album of the Year

== Winners and nominees ==
The nominations were announced on September 20, 2022. The winners are listed first and in bold.

=== General ===
Record of the Year

"Tocarte" – Jorge Drexler & C. Tangana

Carles Campi Campón, Jorge Drexler, Víctor Martínez, Pablopablo & C. Tangana, record producers; Carles Campi Campón, recording engineer; Carles Campi Campón, mixer; Fred Kevorkian, mastering engineer

- "Pa Mis Muchachas" – Christina Aguilera, Becky G, Nicki Nicole featuring Nathy Peluso
  - Rafael Arcaute, Jean Rodriguez, Afo Verde & Federico Vindver, record producers; Rafael Arcaute, Ray Charles Brown, Jr., Jean Rodríguez & Federico Vindver, recording engineers; Jaycen Joshua, mixer; Jaycen Joshua, mastering engineer
- "Castillos de Arena" – Pablo Alborán
  - Paco Salazar, record producer; Felipe Guevara, mixer; Dave Kutch, mastering engineer
- "Envolver" – Anitta
  - Freddy Montalvo, record producer; Freddy Montalvo, mixer; Colin Leonard, mastering engineer
- "Pa'lla Voy" – Marc Anthony
  - Marc Anthony, Julio Reyes Copello & Sergio George, record producers; Juan Mario Aracil, recording engineer; Juan Mario Aracil, mixer; Adam Ayan, mastering engineer
- "Ojitos Lindos" – Bad Bunny & Bomba Estereo
  - Tainy, record producer; Josh Gudwin, mixer; Colin Leonard, mastering engineer
- "Pegao" – Camilo
  - Édgar Barrera, Camilo & Nicolás Ramírez, record producers; Luis Barrera Jr., mixer; Mike Bozzi, mastering engineer
- "Provenza" – Karol G
  - Ovy on the Drums, record producer; Ovy on the Drums, recording engineer; Rob Kinelski, mixer; David Kutch, mastering engineer
- "Vale la Pena" – Juan Luis Guerra
  - Juan Luis Guerra & Janina Rosado, record producers; Amable Frometa & Allan Leschhorn, recording engineers; Allan Leschhorn, mixer; Adam Ayann, mastering engineer
- "LA FAMA" – Rosalía featuring The Weeknd
  - Frank Dukes, El Guincho, Noah Goldstein, Dylan Patrice, Sky Rompiendo, Rosalía, Tainy & The Weeknd, record producers; Shin Kamiyama, Tyler Murphy & David Rodríguez, recording engineers; Manny Marroquin, mixer; Chris Gehringer, mastering engineer
- "Te Felicito" – Shakira & Rauw Alejandro
  - Kevyn Mauricio Cruz Moreno, Alberto Carlos Melendez, Lenin Yorney Palacios, Shakira & Andrés Uribe Marín, record producers; Dave Clauss, Jorge E. Pizarro Ruiz, Cameron Gower Poole, Roger Rodés & Dani Val, recording engineers; Dave Clauss, mixer; Adam Ayan, mastering engineer
- "Baloncito Viejo" – Carlos Vives & Camilo
  - Daniel Cortés, Andrés Leal, Martín Velilla & Carlos Vives, record producers; Andrés Borda, Daniel Cortés, Andrés Leal, Juan Sebastián Parra, Nicolás Ramírez & Martín Velilla, recording engineers; Manny Marroquin, mixer; Dave Kutch, mastering engineer

Album of the Year

Motomami (Digital Album) – Rosalía

James Blake, Frank Dukes, El Guincho, Noah Goldstein, Dylan Patrice, David Rodríguez, Jean Rodriguez, Sky Rompiendo, Rosalía, Tainy, Michael Uzowuru, The Weeknd & Pharrell Williams, album producers; Shin Kamiyama, Michael Larson, Sean Matsukawa, Tyler Murphy & David Rodríguez, album recording engineers; Manny Marroquin, album mixer; Rauw Alejandro, William Bevan, Daniel Gomez Carrero, LaShawn Daniels, Frank Dukes, El Guincho, Kamaal Fareed, Adam Feeney, Larry Gold, Noah Goldstein, Kaan Güneşberk, Teo Halm, Cory Henry, Chad Hugo, Fred Jerkins III, Rodney Jerkins, Tokischa Altagracia Peralta Juárez, James Blake Litherland, James W. Manning, Marco Masis, Juan Luis Morera, Urbani Mota Cedeño, William Ray Norwood Jr., Juan Ivan Orengo, Carlops Querol, Justin Rafael Quiles, David Rodríguez, Rosalía, Jacob Sherman, Alejandro Ramirez Suárez, So Y Tiet, Pilar Vila Tobella, Michael Uzowuru, José Miguel Vizcaya Sánchez, The Weeknd, Dylan Wiggins & Pharrell Williams, songwriters; Chris Gehringer, album mastering engineer

- Aguilera – Christina Aguilera
  - Rafael Arcaute, Édgar Barrera, Josh Berrios, Andy Clay, DallasK, Feid, Honeyboos, Luis Barrera Jr., Jon Leone, Juan Diego Linares, Yasmil Marrufo, Mauricio Rengifo, Jean Rodríguez, Daniel Rondón, Slow, Andrés Torres, Afo Verde, Federico Vindver & Tobias Wincorn, album producers; Rafael Arcaute, Édgar Barrera, Andy Clay, Morgan David, Feid, Hi Flow, Luis Barrera Jr., Ray Charles Brown, Jr., Juan Diego Linares, Yasmil Marrufo, Mauricio Rengifo, Jean Rodríguez, Rafael Rodríguez, Matt Rollings, Slow, Andrés Torres, Felipe Trujillo & Federico Vindver, album recording engineers; Dj Riggins, Jaycen Joshua, Jacob Richards & Mike Seaberg, album mixers; Christina Aguilera, Rafael Arcaute, Édgar Barrera, Josh Berrios, Gino Borri, Luigi Castillo, Santiago Castillo, Jorge Luis Chacín, Andy Clay, Kat Dahlia, DallasK, Mario Domm, Feid, Becky G, Yoel Henríquez, Luis Barrera Jr., Carolina Colón Juarbe, Jon Leone, Juan Diego Linares, Yasmil Marrufo, Juan Morelli, Nicki Nicole, Ozuna, Nathy Peluso, Miguel Andrés Martínez Perea, Pablo Preciado, Servando Primera, Mauricio Rengifo, Rafael Rodríguez, Daniel Rondón, Elena Rose, Martina Stoessel, Sharlene Taule, Andrés Torres, Federico Vindver & Tobias Wincorn, songwriters; Jaycen Joshua, album mastering engineer
- Pa'llá Voy – Marc Anthony
  - Marc Anthony, Sergio George & Julio Reyes Copello, album producers; Juan Mario Aracil & Gerardo Rodriguez, album recording engineers; Juan Mario Aracil, album mixer; Marc Anthony, Rafael Regginalds Aponte, Ángel Alberto Arce, Édgar Barrera, Luigi Castillo, Santiago Castillo, Alain De Armas, Yoenni José Echevarría Barrero, Sergio George, Reinaldo R. López, Álvaro Lenier Mesa, Johann Morales, Florentino Primera Mussett, Papa Serigne Seck & Elena Rose, songwriters; Adam Ayan, album mastering engineer
- Un Verano Sin Ti – Bad Bunny
  - Martin Coogan, Demy & Clipz, Elikai, HAZE, La Paciencia, Cheo Legendary, Mag, MagicEnElBeat, Mora, Subelo Neo, Jota Rosa & Tainy, producers; Josh Gudwin & La Paciencia, mixers; Rauw Alejandro, Bad Bunny, Raquel Berrios, Joshua Conway, Mick Coogan, Jhay Cortez, Luis Del Valle, Elena Rose, Liliana Margarita Saumet, Orlando Javier Valle Vega & Maria Zardoya, songwriters; Colin Leonard, album mastering engineer
- Deja – Bomba Estéreo
  - José Castillo, Simón Mejía & Jeff Peñalva, album producers; Daniel Bustos & Jeff Peñalva, album recording engineers; Damian Taylor, album mixer; Yemi Alade, Shyman Daniel Barry, Carles Campi Campón, José Castillo, Efraín Cuadrado, Leonel García, David M. Karbal, Simón Mejía, Jeff Peñalva, Lido Pimienta, Elizabeth Rodríguez, Liliana Saumet & Magdelys Savigne, songwriters; Chris Allgood & Emily Lazar, album mastering engineers
- Tinta y Tiempo – Jorge Drexler
  - Rafa Arcaute, Javier Calequi, Carles Campi Campón, Jorge Drexler, Noga Erez, Didi Gutman, Victor Martínez, Pablopablo, C. Tangana & Federico Vindver, album producers; Daniel Alanís, Luis Enrique Becerra, Marc Blanes, Martín Buscaglia, Carles Campi Campón, Pablo Drexler, Lucas Piedracueva & Ori Rousso, album recording engineers; Carles Campi Campón & Daniel Carvalho, album mixers; Antón Álvarez Alfaro, Martín Buscaglia, Carlos Casacuberta, Jorge Drexler, Pablo Drexler, Noga Erez, Didi Gutman, Víctor Martínez, Alejandra Melfo, Ori Rousso & Fernando Velázquez, songwriters; Fred Kevorkian, album mastering engineer
- ya no somos los mismos – Elsa y Elmar
  - Alizzz, Julián Bernal, Eduardo Cabra, Elsa Carvajal, Nico Cotton, Manuel Lara & Malay, album producers; Julián Bernal, Nico Cotton, Carlitos González, Alberto Hernández, Michel Kuri, Malay, Felipe Mejía, Jv Olivier, Juan Sebastián Parra, Alejandro García Partida & Alan Saucedo, album recording engineers; Julián Bernal, Mikaelin Bluespruce, Raúl López, Lewis Pickett & Harold Sanders, album mixers; Álvaro José Arroyo, Julián Bernal, Claudia Brant, Eduardo Cabra, Elsa Carvajal, Leonel García, Vicente García Guillen, Joel Mathias Isaksson, Luis Jiménez, Manuel Lara, McKlopedia, Oskar Lars Gustav Nyman & Pablo Preciado, songwriters; Julián Bernal & Dave Kutch, album mastering
- Viajante – Fonseca
  - José Castillo, Fonseca, Juan Galeano, Yadam González, Simón Mejía, Mauricio Rengifo, Julio Reyes Copello & Andrés Torres, album producers; José Castillo, Sebastian De Peyrecave, Antonio Espinosa Holguín, Fonseca, Juan Galeano, Yadam González, Carlos Fernando López, Simón Mejía, Nicolás Ramírez, Mauricio Rengifo, Julio Reyes Copello, Alen Hadzi Stefanov, Andrés Torres & Daniel Uribe, album recording engineers; Jaycen Joshua, Trevor Muzzy, Tom Norris & Alejandro Patiño, album mixers; Mario Cáceres, José Castillo, Andy Clay, Silvestre Dangond, Juan Fernando Fonseca, Juan Galeano, Miguel Yadam González, Yoel Henríquez, Erick Alejandro Iglesias Rodríguez, Simón Mejía, Greeicy Rendón, Alejandro Rengifo, Mauricio Rengifo, Julio Reyes Copello & Andrés Torres, songwriters; Dave Kutch, Tom Norris & Alejandro Patiño, album mastering engineers
- Sanz – Alejandro Sanz
  - Carlos Jean, Javier Limón, Alfonso Pérez & Alejandro Sanz, album producers; Carlos Del Valle, Daniel Guzmán, Andrew Hey, Sebastián Laverde, Marcos Mejías, Alfonso Pérez, Martin Roller, Alexander Sánchez "Kyd", Iván Valdés & Peter Walsh, album recording engineers; Peter Walsh, album mixer; Beatriz Álvarez Beigbeder Casas, Maria Alejandra Álvarez Beigbeder Casas, Viviana Álvarez Beigbeder Casas, María Ángeles Álvarez Beigbeder Casas, Juan D'anyelica, Paco De Lucía, Limon Jr, Javier Limón, Isidro Muñoz Alcón, José Miguel Muñoz Alcón, Alfonso Pérez & Alejandro Sanz, songwriters; Frank Arkwright, album mastering engineer
- Dharma – Sebastián Yatra
  - Julián Bernal, Caleb Calloway, Cashae, Pablo María Rousselon De Croisoeuil Chateaurenard, Andrés Guerrero, Hear This Music, Manuel Lara, Jon Leone, Pablo López, Joan Josep Monserrat Riutort, Gabriel Morales, Andres Munera, Noise Up, Ovy on the Drums, Mauricio Rengifo, Julio Reyes Copello, Andrés Torres & Xaxo, album producers; César Augusto, Andrés Guerrero, John Hanes, Jonathan Julca, Nicolas Ladrón De Guevara, Manuel Lara, Jon Leone, Maya, Max Miglin, Andres Munera, Anthony Edward Ralph Parrilla Medina, Mauricio Rengifo, Julio Reyes Copello, Daniel Riaño, Jean Rodriguez, Natalia Schlesinger & Andrés Torres, album recording engineers; Serban Ghenea, Andrés Guerrero Ruiz, Jaycen Joshua, Mosty, Tom Norris & Natalia Schlesinger, album mixers; Rauw Alejandro, Benjamin Alerhand Sissa, J Angel, Juan Diego Arteaga, César Augusto, Joseph Michael Barrios, Julián Bernal, Manuel Alejandro Bustillo, Jorge Celedón, Orlando J. Cepeda Matos, Andy Clay, Manuel Enrique Lara Colmenares, Pablo María Rousselon De Croisoeuil, Kevyn Mauricio Cruz Moreno, Daddy Yankee, Alvaro Diaz, Alejandro Manuel Fernandez, Rosario Flores, Manuel Lorente Freire, Pablo C Fuentes, David Julca, Jonathan Julca, Manuel Lara, Jonathan David Leone, Hector C Lopez, Pablo Lopez, Luian Malave, Christian Daniel Mojica Blanco, Joan Josep Monserrat Riutort, Natti Natasha, Aitana Ocaña, Ovy on the Drums, Daniel Perez Venencia, Luis J. Perez Jr, Mariah Angelique Perez, Raphy Pina, Alejandro Rengifo, Mauricio Rengifo, José M. Reyes, Julio Reyes Copello, Juan Josep Monserrat Riutort, Elena Rose, Rafael Salcedo, Jean Carlos Santiago, Sech, Edgar Semper, Xavier Semper, Julio Manuel Gonzalez Tavarez, Andres Torres, Michael Torres Monge, Manuel Turizo, Alejandro Robledo Valencia, Elian Angel Valenzuela, Juan Camilo Vargas & Sebastián Yatra, songwriters; Mike Bozzi, Gene Grimaldi, Dave Kutch, Mosty & Tom Norris, mastering engineers

Song of the Year

"Tocarte" – Jorge Drexler & C. Tangana

Jorge Drexler, Pablo Drexler, Víctor Martínez & C. Tangana, songwriters

- "A Veces Bien Y A Veces Mal" – Ricky Martin featuring Reik
  - Pedro Capó, Kiko Cibrian, Ricky Martin, Pablo Preciado, Julio Ramirez, Mauricio Rengifo & Andrés Torres, songwriters
- "Agua" – Daddy Yankee, Rauw Alejandro & Nile Rodgers
  - Rauw Alejandro, Emmanuel Anene, David Alberto Macias, Nile Rodgers, Juan Salinas, Oscar Salinas & Daddy Yankee, songwriters
- "Algo es Mejor" – Mon Laferte
  - Mon Laferte, songwriter
- "Baloncito Viejo" – Carlos Vives & Camilo
  - Camilo, Jorge Luis Chacín, Andrés Leal, Martín Velilla & Carlos Vives, songwriters
- "Besos en la Frente" – Fonseca
  - Fonseca & Julio Reyes Copello, songwriters
- "Encontrarme" – Carla Morrison
  - Carla Morrison, Juan Alejandro Jimenez Perez & Mario Demian Jimenez Perez, songwriters
- "Hentai" – Rosalía
  - Larry Gold, Noah Goldstein, Chad Hugo, David Rodríguez, Rosalía, Jacob Sherman, Michael Uzowuru, Pilar Vila Tobella, Dylan Wiggins & Pharrell Williams, songwriters
- "índigo" – Camilo & Evaluna Montaner
  - Édgar Barrera & Camilo, songwriters
- "Pa Mis Muchachas" – Christina Aguilera, Becky G, Nicki Nicole featuring Nathy Peluso
  - Christina Aguilera, Jorge Luis Chacín, Kat Dahlia, Becky G, Yoel Henríquez, Yasmil Marrufo, Nicki Nicole & Nathy Peluso, songwriters
- "Provenza" – Karol G
  - Kevyn Mauricio Cruz Moreno, Carolina Giraldo Navarro & Ovy on the Drums, songwriters
- "Tacones Rojos" – Sebastián Yatra
  - Juan Jo, Manuel Lara, Manuel Lorente, Pablo & Sebastián Yatra, songwriters

Best New Artist

Angela Alvarez

Silvana Estrada

- Sofía Campos
- Cande y Paulo
- Clarissa
- Pol Granch
- Nabález
- Tiare
- Vale
- Yahritza y Su Esencia
- Nicole Zignago

=== Pop ===
Best Pop Vocal Album

Dharma – Sebastián Yatra

- ya no somos los mismos – Elsa y Elmar
- El Amor Que Merecemos – Kany García
- Clichés – Jesse & Joy
- El Renacimiento – Carla Morrison

Best Traditional Pop Vocal Album

Aguilera – Christina Aguilera

- Viajante – Fonseca
- Filarmónico 20 Años – Marta Gómez
- La Vida – Kurt
- Frecuencia – Sin Bandera

Best Pop Song

"La Guerrilla de la Concordia" – Jorge Drexler

Jorge Drexler, songwriter

"Tacones Rojos" – Sebastián Yatra

Pablo María Rousselon De Croisoeuil, Manuel Lara, Manuel Lorente, Juan Josep Monserrat Riutort & Sebastián Yatra, songwriters

- "Baloncito Viejo" – Carlos Vives & Camilo
  - Camilo, Jorge Luis Chacín, Andrés Leal, Martín Velilla & Carlos Vives, songwriters
- "Besos en la Frente" – Fonseca
  - Julio Reyes Copello & Fonseca, songwriters
- "Índigo" – Camilo & Evaluna Montaner
  - Édgar Barrera & Camilo, songwriters

=== Urban ===
Best Urban Fusion/Performance

"Tití Me Preguntó" – Bad Bunny

- "Pa Mis Muchachas" – Christina Aguilera, Nicki Nicole, Becky G featuring Nathy Peluso
- "Santo" – Christina Aguilera & Ozuna
- "Volví" – Bad Bunny & Aventura
- "This is Not America" – Residente featuring Ibeyi

Best Reggaeton Performance

"Lo Siento BB:/" – Tainy, Bad Bunny & Julieta Venegas

- "Desesperados" – Rauw Alejandro & Chencho Corleone
- "Envolver" – Anitta
- "Yonaguni" – Bad Bunny
- "Nicky Jam: Bzrp Music Sessions, Vol. 41" – Bizarrap & Nicky Jam

Best Urban Music Album

Un Verano Sin Ti – Bad Bunny

- Respira – Akapellah
- Trap Cake, Vol. 2 – Rauw Alejandro
- Los Favoritos 2.5 – Arcángel
- Animal – María Becerra

Best Rap/Hip Hop Song

"De Museo" – Bad Bunny

Bad Bunny, songwriter

- "Amor" – Akapellah
  - Akapellah, songwriter
- "Dance Crip" – Trueno
  - Santiago Ruiz, Brian Taylor & Trueno, songwriters
- "El Gran Robo, Pt. 2" – Lito MC Cassidy & Daddy Yankee
  - Phanlon Anton Alexander, Geovanny Andrades Andino, Daddy Yankee & Lito MC Cassidy, songwriters
- "Freestyle 15" – Farina
  - Farina, songwriter

Best Urban Song

"Tití Me Preguntó" – Bad Bunny

Bad Bunny, songwriter

- "Desesperados" – Rauw Alejandro & Chencho Corleone
  - Rauw Alejandro, José M. Collazo, Chencho Corleone, Jorge Cedeño Echevarria, Luis Jonuel González, Eric Pérez Rovira, Jorge E. Pizarro Ruiz & Nino Karlo Segarra, songwriters
- "Lo Siento BB:/" – Tainy, Bad Bunny & Julieta Venegas
  - Bad Bunny, Tainy & Julieta Venegas, songwriters
- "Mamiii" – Becky G & Karol G
  - Luis Miguel Gomez Castaño, Becky G, Karol G, Ovy on the Drums, Justin Quiles, Elena Rose & Daniel Uribe, songwriters
- "Ojos Rojos" – Nicky Jam
  - Samantha M. Cámara, Nicky Jam, Vicente Jiménez, Dallas James Koehlke, Manuel Larrad & Juan Diego Medina Vélez, songwriters

=== Rock ===
Best Rock Album

Unas Vacaciones Raras – Él Mató a un Policía Motorizado

- Mojigata – Marilina Bertoldi
- Cada Vez Cadáver – Fito & Fitipaldis
- 1021 – La Gusana Ciega
- RPDF – Whiplash

Best Rock Song

"Lo Mejor de Nuestras Vidas" – Fito Páez

Fito Páez, songwriter

- "Día Mil" – Eruca Sativa
  - Eruca Sativa, songwriters
- "Esperando una Señal" – Bunbury
  - Bunbury, songwriter
- "Finisterre" – Vetusta Morla
  - Juan Manuel Latorre, songwriter
- "No Olvidamos" – Molotov
  - Molotov, songwriters
- "QUE SE MEJOREN" – WOS
  - WOS & Facundo Yalve, songwriters

Best Pop/Rock Album

Los Años Salvajes – Fito Páez

- Trinchera – Babasónicos
- Monstruos – Bruses
- La Dirección – Conociendo Rusia
- Cable a Tierra – Vetusta Morla

Best Pop/Rock Song

"Babel" – Carlos Vives & Fito Páez

Fito Páez & Carlos Vives, songwriters

- "ARRANCARMELO" – WOS
  - WOS & Facundo Yalve, songwriters
- "Bye Bye" – Babasónicos
  - Diego Castellano, Adrian Dargelos & Gustavo Torres, songwriters
- "Disfraz" – Conociendo Rusia
  - Felicitas Colina & Conociendo Rusia, songwriters
- "qué voy a hacer conmigo??" – Elsa y Elmar
  - Bruses, Elsa y Elmar & Alan Saucedo, songwriters

=== Alternative ===
Best Alternative Music Album

Motomami (Digital Album) – Rosalía

- The Sacred Leaf – Afro-Andean Funk
- Kick II – Arca
- Deja – Bomba Estéreo
- El Disko – CA7RIEL

Best Alternative Song

"El Día que Estrenaste el Mundo" – Jorge Drexler

Rafa Arcaute, Jorge Drexler & Federico Vindver, songwriters

- "Bad Bitch" – CA7RIEL
  - Ca7riel & Tomas Sainz, songwriters
- "00:00" – Siddhartha
  - Alejandro Pérez, Siddhartha & Rul Velázquez, songwriters
- "Conexión Total" – Bomba Estéreo & Yemi Alade
  - Yemi Alade, Carles Campi Campón, José Castillo, Jeff Peñalva, Liliana Saumet & Magdelys Savigne, songwriters
- "Culpa" – WOS featuring Ricardo Mollo
  - Ricardo Mollo, Omar Varela, WOS & Facundo Yalve, songwriters
- "Hentai" – Rosalía
  - Larry Gold, Noah Goldstein, Chad Hugo, Rosalía, David Rodríguez, Jacob Sherman, Michael Uzowuru, Pilar Vila Tobella, Dylan Wiggins & Pharrell Williams, songwriters

=== Tropical ===
Best Salsa Album

Pa'llá Voy – Marc Anthony

- Será Que Se Acabó – Alexander Abreu & Havana D'Primera
- Luis Figueroa – Luis Figueroa
- Y Te lo Dice... – Luisito Ayala and La Puerto Rican Power
- Lado A Lado B – Víctor Manuelle

Best Cumbia/Vallenato Album

Feliz Aniversario – Jean Carlos Centeno and Ronal Urbina

- Clásicos de Mi Cumbia – Checo Acosta
- Quiero Verte Feliz – La Santa Cecilia
- El de Siempre – Felipe Peláez
- Yo Soy Colombia – Zona 8 R & Rolando Ochoa

Best Merengue/Bachata Album

Entre Mar y Palmeras – Juan Luis Guerra

- Este Soy Yo – Héctor Acosta "El Torito"
- Multitudes – Elvis Crespo
- Resistirá – Milly Quezada
- Tañon Pal' Combo es lo que Hay – Olga Tañón

Best Traditional Tropical Album

Gonzalo Rubalcaba y Aymée Nuviola Live in Marciac – Gonzalo Rubalcaba and Aymée Nuviola

- Café con Cariño – Renesito Avich
- Chabuco Desde el Teatro Colón de Bogotá – Chabuco
- Gran Combo Pa' Rato – Septeto Nacional Ignacio Piñeiro
- Canten – Leoni Torres

Best Contemporary Tropical Album

Cumbiana II – Carlos Vives

- El Mundo está Loco – Jorge Luis Chacín
- De Menor a Mayor – Gente De Zona
- All Inclusive – Marissa Mur
- Tropico – Pavel Núñez

Best Tropical Song

"Mala" – Marc Anthony

Marc Anthony & Álvaro Lenier Mesa, songwriters

- "Agüita e Coco" – Kany García
  - Mario Cáceres, Jorge Luis Chacín, Kany García, Richi López & Yasmil Marrufo, songwriters
- "El Malecón vió el Final" – Amaury Gutiérrez
  - Jorge Luis Piloto, songwriter
- "El Parrandero (Masters en Parranda)" – Carlos Vives, Sin Ánimo De Lucro, JBot & Tuti
  - Juan Botero, Miguel Henao, Alvaro Negret, Santiago Restrepo, Joaquin Rodríguez, Juan José Roesel, Sin Ánimo De Lucro, José Nicolás Urdinola, Juan "One" Sebastián Valencia & Carlos Vives, songwriters
- "Fiesta Contigo" – Luis Figueroa
  - Luis Figueroa & Yoel Henríquez, songwriters

=== Songwriter ===
Best Singer-Songwriter Album

Tinta y Tiempo – Jorge Drexler

- Malvadisco – Caloncho
- Agendas Vencidas – El David Aguilar
- Marchita – Silvana Estrada
- En lo Que Llega la Primavera – Alex Ferreira
- El Viaje – Pedro Guerra

=== Regional Mexican ===
Best Ranchero/Mariachi Album

EP #1 Forajido – Christian Nodal

- Mexicana Enamorada – Ángela Aguilar
- Mi Herencia, Mi Sangre – Majo Aguilar
- 40 Aniversario Embajadores del Mariachi – Mariachi Sol de Mexico de José Hernández
- Qué Ganas de Verte (Deluxe) – Marco Antonio Solís

Best Banda Album

Abeja Reina – Chiquis

- Esta Vida es Muy Bonita – Banda El Recodo de Cruz Lizárraga
- Va de Nuevo – Banda Fortuna
- Me Siento a Todo Dar – Banda Los Recoditos
- Sin Miedo al Éxito (Deluxe) – Banda Los Sebastianes

Best Tejano Album

Para Que Baile Mi Pueblo – Bobby Pulido

- Despreciado – El Plan
- Camino al Progreso – Grupo Álamo
- Una Ilusión – Isabel Marie
- Dime Cómo se Siente – Destiny Navaira

Best Norteño Album

La Reunión (Deluxe) – Los Tigres del Norte

- Bienvenida la Vida – Bronco
- Corridos Felones (Serie35) – Los Tucanes de Tijuana
- Esta se Acompañas con Cerveza – Pesado
- Obsessed – Yahritza y Su Esencia

Best Regional Mexican Song

"Como lo Hice Yo" – Matisse & Carín León

Édgar Barrera, Carin León & Matisse, songwriters

- "Ahpi Donde Me Ven" – Ángela Aguilar
  - Gussy Lau, songwriters
- "Cada Quien" – Grupo Firme and Maluma
  - Édgar Barrera, Eduin Caz, Nathan Galante, Maluma & Horacio Palencia, songwriters
- "Chale" – Edén Muñoz
  - Edén Muñoz, songwriter
- "Cuando Me Dé la Gana" – Christina Aguilera & Christian Nodal
  - Christina Aguilera, Rafael Arcaute, Jorge Luis Chacín, Kat Dahlia, Yoel Henríquez, Yasmil Marrufo & Federico Vindver, songwriters
- "Nunca te Voy a Olvidar" – Mireya featuring Flor de Toloache, Roman Rojas & Jorge Glem
  - Mireya & Roman Rojas, songwriters
- "Vivo en el 6" – Christian Nodal
  - Édgar Barrera, Edén Muñoz & Christian Nodal, songwriters

=== Instrumental ===
Best Instrumental Album

Maxixe Samba Groove – Hamilton de Holanda

- Back to 4 – C4 Trío
- Gerry Weil Sinfónico – Gerry Weil & Orquesta Sinfónica Simón Bolívar
- Ofrenda – Grupo Raíces de Venezuela
- Ella – Daniela Padrón & Glenda del E

=== Traditional ===
Best Folk Album

Ancestro Sinfónico – Sintesis, X-Alfonso y Eme Alfonso

- La Tierra Llora – Paulina Aguirre
- Quédate en Casa – Eva Ayllón
- Flor y Raíz – Pedro Aznar
- Palabras Urgentes – Susana Baca
- Un Canto por México – El Musical – Natalia Lafourcade
- Bendiciones – Sandra Mihanovich

Best Tango Album

Horacio Salgán Piano Transcriptions – Pablo Estigarribia

- Alma Vieja – Los Tangueros del Oeste
- Tango – Ricardo Montaner
- Milonguero – Pablo Motta Ensamble featuring Franco Luciani
- Tango de Nuevos Ayres – Mariana Quinteros
- Spinettango – Spinettango

Best Flamenco Album

Libres – Las Migas

- Orgánica – Carmen Doorá
- Leo – Estrella Morente
- El Cante – Kiki Morente
- Ranchera Flamenca – María Toledo

=== Jazz ===
Best Latin Jazz/Jazz Album

Mirror Mirror – Eliane Elias, Chick Corea, Chucho Valdés

- Jobim Forever – Antonio Adolfo
- #Cubanamerican – Martin Bejerano
- Chabem – Chano Domínguez, Rubem Dantas & Hamilton de Holanda

=== Christian ===
Best Christian Album (Spanish Language)

Viviré – Marcos Witt

- Ya Llegó la Primavera – Aroddy
- Alfa y Omega – Athenas
- ¿Quién Dijo Miedo? (Live) – Gilberto Daza
- ¿Cómo Me Ves? – Jesús Adrián Romero

Best Christian Album (Portuguese Language)

Laboratório do Groove – Eli Soares

- Antes da Terapia – Asaph
- O Samba e o Amor – Antonio Cirilo
- Epifania – Clovis
- És Tudo – Bruna Karla

=== Portuguese Language ===
Best Portuguese Language Contemporary Pop Album

Sim Sim Sim – Bala Desejo

- Pra Gente Acordar – Gilsons
- Pirata – Jão
- De Primeira – Marina Sena
- Doce 22 – Luísa Sonza

Best Portuguese Language Rock or Alternative Album

O Futuro Pertence à... Jovem Guarda – Erasmo Carlos

- QVVJFA? – Baco Exu do Blues
- Sobre Viver – Criolo
- Memórias (De Onde eu Nunca Fui) – Lagum
- Delta Estácio Blues – Juçara Marçal

Best Samba/Pagode Album

Numanice 2 – Ludmilla

- Bons Ventos – Nego Alvaro
- Mistura Homogênea – Martinho Da Vila
- Desengaiola – Alfredo Del-Penho, João Cavalcanti, Moyseis Marques e Pedro Miranda
- Céu Lilás – Péricles

Best MPB (Musica Popular Brasileira) Album

Indigo Borboleta Anil – Liniker

- Pomares – Chico Chico
- Síntese do Lance – João Donato and Jards Macalé
- Nu Com a Minha Música – Ney Matogrosso
- Portas – Marisa Monte
- Meu Coco – Caetano Veloso

Best Sertaneja Music Album

Chitãozinho & Xororó Legado – Chitãozinho & Xororó

- Agropoc – Gabeu
- Expectativa x Realidade – Matheus & Kauan
- Patroas 35% – Marília Mendonça, Maiara & Maraísa
- Natural – Lauana Prado

Best Portuguese Language Roots Album

Senhora Estrada – Alceu Valença

- Afrocanto as Nações – Mateus Aleluia
- Na Estrada . Ao Vivo – Banda Pau e Corda Featuring Quinteto Violado
- Remelexo Bom – Luiz Caldas
- Belo Chico – Targino Gondim, Nilton Freittas, Roberto Malvezzi
- Senhora das Folhas – Áurea Martins
- Oríki – Iara Rennó

Best Portuguese Language Song

"Vento Sardo" – Marisa Monte featuring Jorge Drexler

Jorge Drexler & Marisa Monte, songwriters

- "Baby 95" – Liniker
  - Liniker, Mahmundi, Tássia Reis & Tulipa Ruiz, songwriters
- "Idiota" – Jão
  - Jão, Pedro Tófani & Zebu, songwriters
- "Me Corte Na Boca Do Céu a Morte Não Pede" – Criolo featuring Milton Nascimento
  - Criolo & Tropkillaz, songwriters
- "Meu Coco" – Caetano Veloso
  - Caetano Veloco, songwriter
- "Por Supuesto" – Marina Sena
  - Iuri Rio Branco & Marina Sena, songwriters

=== Children's ===
Best Latin Children's Album

A la Fiesta de la Música Vamos Todos – Sophia

- Marakei – Claraluna
- Danilo & Chapis, Vol. 2 – Danilo & Chapis
- Tarde de Juegos – Mi Casa Es Tu Casa
- La Sinfonía de los Bichos Raros – Puerto Candelaria

=== Classical ===
Best Classical Album

Legado – Berta Rojas

Sebastián Henríquez, album producer

- Brujos – Orquesta Sinfónica de Heredia
  - Eddie Mora, conductor; Eddie Mora, album producer
- El Ruido del Agua – Eddie Mora
  - Carlos Chaves & Eddie Mora, album producers
- Erika Ribeiro – Ígor Stravinsky, Sofia Gubaidúlina e Hermeto Pascoal – Erika Ribeiro
  - Sylvio Fraga & Bernardo Ramos, album producers
- Villa-Lobos: Complete Violin Sonatas – Emmanuele Baldini, Pablo Rossi & Heitor Villa-Lobos

Best Classical Contemporary Composition

"Anido's Portrait: I. Chararera" – Berta Rojas

Sérgio Assad, composer

- "Adagio for Strings, A Mother's Love" – Juan Arboleda
  - Juan Arboleda, composer
- "Aurora" – Houston Symphony Orchestra featuring Andrés Orozco-Estrada (conductor) & Leticia Moreno (soloist)
  - Jimmy López Bellido, composer
- "Canauê, for Orchestra" – Dimitri Cervo
  - Dimitri Cervo, composer
- "Cuatro Haikus" – Orquesta Sinfónica de Heredia featuring José Arturo Chacón
  - Eddie Mora, composer

=== Arrangement ===
Best Arrangement

"El Plan Maestro" – Jorge Drexler

Fernando Velázquez, arranger

- "Llévatela" – Armando Manzanero & EJE Ejecutantes de México
  - Rosino Serrano, arranger
- "Son de la Loma" – Dani Barón
  - Daniel Barón & Henry Villalobos, arranger
- "Adoro" – Alondra de la Parra & Buika
  - Marco Godoy, arranger
- "Cucurrucucú Paloma" – Alondra de la Parra & Pitingo
  - Paul Rubinstein, arranger

=== Recording Package ===
Best Recording Package

Motomami (Digital Album) – Rosalía

Ferran Echegaray, Viktor Hammarberg, Rosalía, Daniel Sannwald & Pili Vila, art directors

- Ancestras – Petrona Martinez
  - Isaura Angulo, Carlos Dussán, Karen Flores, Manuel Garcia-Orozco, Juliana Jaramillo, Ledania & Lido Pimienta, art directors
- Bailaora – Mis Pies Son Mi Voz – Siudy Garrido featuring Ismael Fernandez, Manuel Gago, Jose Luis Rodriguez & Adolfo Herrera
  - Pedro Fajardo & Siudy Garrido, art directors
- Cuano Te Muerdes el Labio (Edición Cerámica) – Leiva
  - Boa Mistura, art director
- Feira Livre – Bananeira Brass Band
  - Carlos Bauer, art director

=== Production ===
Best Engineered Album

Motomami (Digital Album) – Rosalía

Chris Gehringer, engineer; Jeremie Inhaber, Manny Marroquin, Zach Peraya & Anthony Vilchis, mixers; Chris Gehringer, mastering engineer

- Dentro da Matrix – Érico Moreira
  - Cesar J. De Cisneros & Érico Moreira, engineers; Érico Moreira, mixer; Felipe Tichauer, mastering engineer
- Indigo Borboleta Anil – Liniker
  - Zé Nigro & Gustavo Ruiz, engineers; João Milliet & Rodrigo Sanches, mixers; Felipe Tichauer, mastering engineer
- Jobim Forever – Antonio Adolfo
  - Marcelo Saboia, engineer; Marcelo Saboia, mixer; Andre Dias, mastering engineer
- ya no somos los mismos – Elsa y Elmar
  - Julián Bernal, Nico Cotton, Carlitos González, Alberto Hernández, Michel Kuri, Malay, Felipe Mejía, Jv Olivier, Juan Sebastián Parra, Alejandro García Partida & Alan Saucedo, engineers; Julián Bernal, Mikaelin Bluespruce, Raúl López, Lewis Pickett & Harold Sanders, mixers; Julián Bernal & Dave Kutch, mastering engineers

Producer of the Year

Julio Reyes Copello

- **"Besos En La Frente" (Fonseca)**
- **"Carne y Oro" (Cami & Art House)**
- **"Cuantas Veces" (Carlos Rivera, Reik)**
- **Koati Original Soundtrack (Various Artists)**
- **"Los Rotos" (Ela Taubert)**
- **"Nada Particular" (Miguel Bosé & Carlos Rivera)**
- **Pa'llá Voy (Marc Anthony)**
- **"Parte de Mi" (Nicki Nicole)**
- **"Puro Sentimiento" (Alejandro Lerner & Carlos Santana)**
- **"Quererte Bonito" (Sebastián Yatra & Elena Rose)**
- **"Se Nos Rompio El Amor" (David Bisbal)**

- Édgar Barrera
  - "Cada Quien" (Grupo Firme & Maluma)
  - "Indigo" (Camilo & Evaluna Montaner)
  - "Kesi Remix" (Camilo & Shawn Mendes)
  - "999" (Selena Gomez & Camilo)
  - "Pegao" (Camilo)
  - "Pesadilla" (Camilo)
  - "Sobrio" (Maluma)
- Eduardo Cabra
  - "Atravesao" (Elsa y Elmar)
  - "El Arca de Mima" (Mima)
  - "Fiesta En Lo Del Dr. Hermes" (El Cuarteto de Nos)
  - Hermes Croatto (Hermes Croatto)
  - "La Ciudad Sin Alma" (El Cuarteto de Nos)
  - "Mañosa" (Canina)
  - "Respiro Perdon" (Hermes Croato)
- Nico Cotton
  - "El Enemigo" (Conociendo Rusia)
  - La Dirección (Conociendo Rusia)
  - "Loco" (Tiago PZK)
  - Nena Trampa (Cazzu)
  - "Primavera" (Elsa y Elmar)
  - "Sobre Mi Tumba" (Cazzu)
  - "Último y Primero" (Elsa y Elmar)
  - "Vuelve" (Elsa y Elmar)
- Tainy
  - "Candy" (Rosalía)
  - "¿Cuándo Fue?" (Various Artists)
  - "Desenfocao'" (Rauw Alejandro)
  - "En Mi Cuarto" (Various Artists)
  - "In Da Getto" (Various Artists)
  - "La Fama" (Various Artists)
  - "Lo Siento BB:/" (Various Artists)
  - "X Última Vez" (Daddy Yankee & Bad Bunny)
  - "Yonaguni" (Bad Bunny)

=== Music video ===
Best Short Form Music Video

"This is Not America" – Residente featuring Ibeyi, Lisa-Kaindé Diaz & Naomi Diaz

Greg Ohrel, video director; Jason Cole, video producer

- "Mía" – Cami
  - Nuno Gomes, video director; Mona Moreno Fernández & Ada Odreman, video producers
- "A Carta Cabal" – Guitarricadelafuente
  - Pau Carrete, video director; Vivir Rodando, video producer
- "Hentai" – Rosalía
  - Mitch Ryan, video director; Harrison Corwin & Patrick Donovan, video producers
- "Nadie" – Sin Bandera
  - Hernán Corera & Juan Piczman, video directors; Sonti Charnas, Luca Macome, Balisario Saravia & Juan Saravia, video producers
- "Tocarte" – Jorge Drexler & C. Tangana
  - Joana Colomar, video director; Zissou, video producer

Best Long Form Music Video

Hasta la Raíz: El Documental – Natalia Lafourcade

Bruno Bancalari & Juan Pablo López-Fonseca, video directors; Juan Pablo López-Fonseca, video producer

- Bailaora – Mis Pies Son Mi Voz – Siudy Garrido
  - Pablo Croce, video director; Pablo Croce, Siudy Garrido, Adrienne Arhst Center, video producer
- Motomami (Rosalía Tiktok Live Performance) – Rosalía
  - Ferrán Echegaray, Rosalía & Stillz, video directors
- Romeo Santos: King of Bachata – Romeo Santos
  - Devin Amar & Charles Todd, video directors; Katherine Aquino, Ned Doyle, Raphael Estrella, Sheira Rees-Davies, Amaury Rodríguez & James Rothman, video producers
- Matria – Vetusta Morla
  - Patrick Knot, video director; Vetusta Morla, video producer

=== Special awards ===
Person of the Year

- **Marco Antonio Solís**

Lifetime Achievement Award

- **Rosario Flores**
- **Myriam Hernández**
- **Rita Lee**
- **Amanda Miguel**
- **Yordano**

Trustees Award

- **Manolo Díaz**
- **Paquito D'Rivera**
- **Abraham Laboriel**

=== Most Nominations ===
10 Nominations

- Bad Bunny

9 Nominations

- Edgar Barrera

8 Nominations

- Jorge Drexler
- Rosalia

7 Nominations

- Christina Aguilera

6 Nominations

- Camilo
- Carlos Vives

5 Nominations

- Becky G
- Fonseca

4 Nominations

- C. Tangana
- Marc Anthony
- Nathy Peluso
- Sebastian Yatra

3 Nominations

- Daddy Yankee
- Karol G

2 Nominations

- Anitta
- Christian Nodal
- Natalia Lafourcade
- Ozuna
- Silvana Estrada
- The Weeknd
