= Jósean Log =

Mexican musician (born 1990)

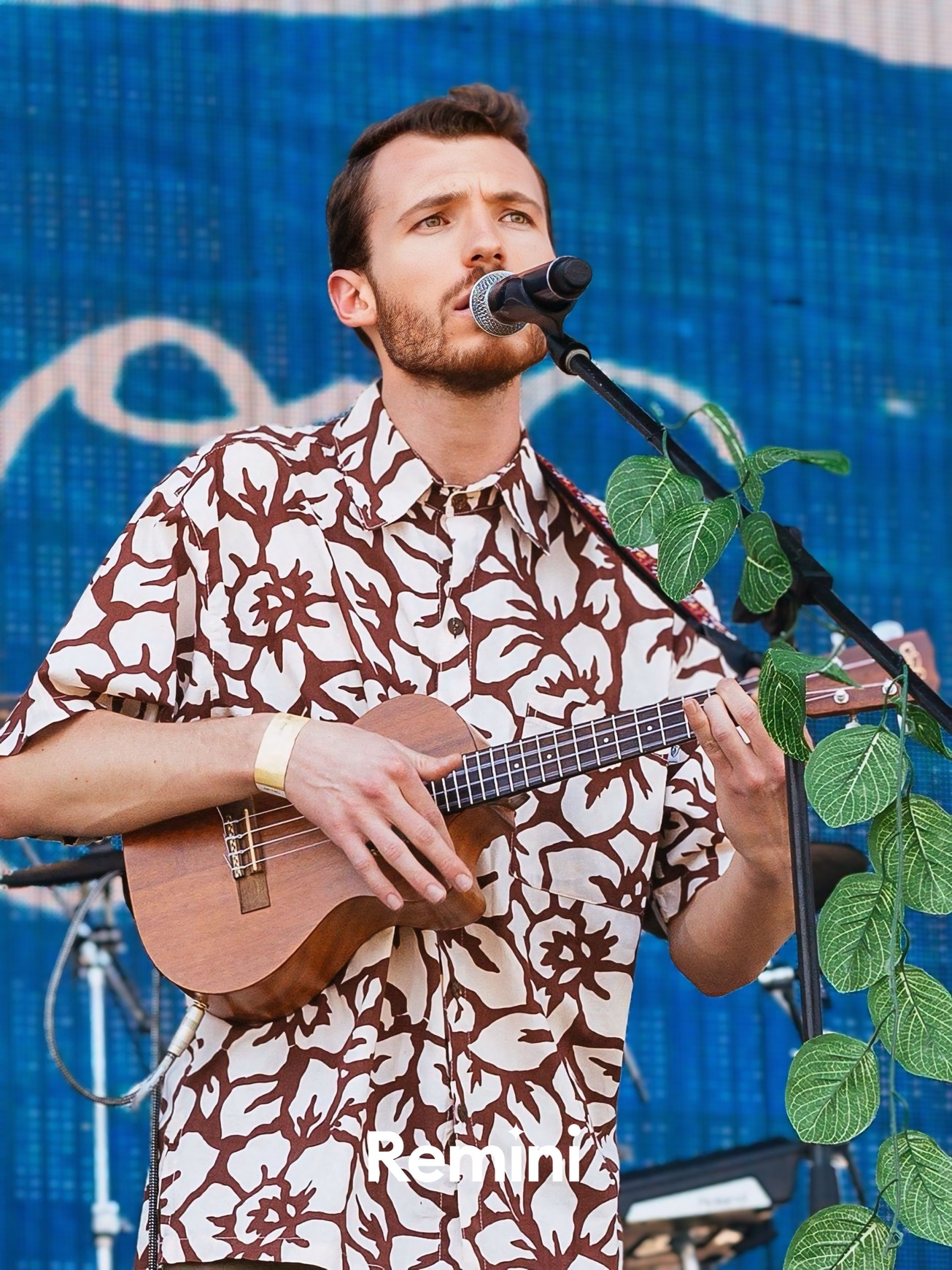
- Log performing live

Background information
- Born: José Antonio Lozano Gendreau; April 23, 1990 (age 36); Cholula de Rivadavia, Puebla, Mexico
- Genres: Folk; Indie pop
- Occupations: Singer-songwriter; musician; composer; multi-instrumentalist
- Instruments: Ukulele; vocals
- Years active: 2016–present
- Label: Independent
- Website: joseanlog.com

José Antonio Lozano Gendreau (born April 23, 1990), known professionally as Jósean Log, is a Mexican singer-songwriter, musician, composer, and multi-instrumentalist. He began his musical career on YouTube with an acoustic version of his song "Chachachá," which has accumulated over 290 million views on the platform and over 500 million streams on Spotify. His music combines genres such as folk, rock, bolero, and blues with the ukulele as a central instrument, exploring themes of love, heartbreak, and self-discovery In his “Handsome pop” style. His musical influences include Manu Chao and Jorge Drexler.

== Biography ==
Jósean Log was born in Cholula de Rivadavia, Puebla, Mexico. He studied music at Berklee College of Music in Boston, Massachusetts.

Log released his debut EP Háblate de mí in 2016, featuring the songs "Chachachá," "Beso," "Doma," "Tierra," and "La Luna." On January 26, 2018, he released his second EP Háblame de tú, containing the tracks "La vida la vida," "Combustión," "No quise," and "Contento de contento." The EP was produced by Mateo Lewis. This was followed by El futuro no existe (2019), El tiempo locura todo (2020), and Más normal de lo normal (2024).

Log has collaborated with various artists, including a 2020 collaboration with Elsa y Elmar and Daniel, me estás matando on the single "Grecia." In 2021, he collaborated with Esteman on the song "Mar" from the album Si volviera a nacer. He has also collaborated with Salomón Beda on the song "Playa y sol" and participated in various music festivals.

In 2021, Log composed the song "Queride compañere" in support of non-binary people and inclusive language use. The song received mixed reactions on social media.

== Personal life ==
Log describes himself as a "world citizen in love with life" and has expressed his love for nature and animals, following a vegetarian lifestyle. He describes himself as an idealist who enjoys philosophical discussions.

== Discography ==
=== Extended plays ===
- Háblate de mí (2016) – Contains "Chachachá," "Beso," "Doma," "Tierra," and "La Luna"
- Háblame de tú (2018) – Contains "La vida la vida," "Combustión," "No quise," and "Contento de contento"
- El futuro no existe (2019) – Contains "Canción sin nombre," "Un día más," "Alguien como tú," and "Sábanas tibias"
- El tiempo locura todo (2020)
- Más normal de lo normal (2024)

=== Notable singles ===
- "Chachachá" (2016)
- "Jacaranda" (2018)
- "Reflexión del pasto" (2020)
