= Ali Stone =

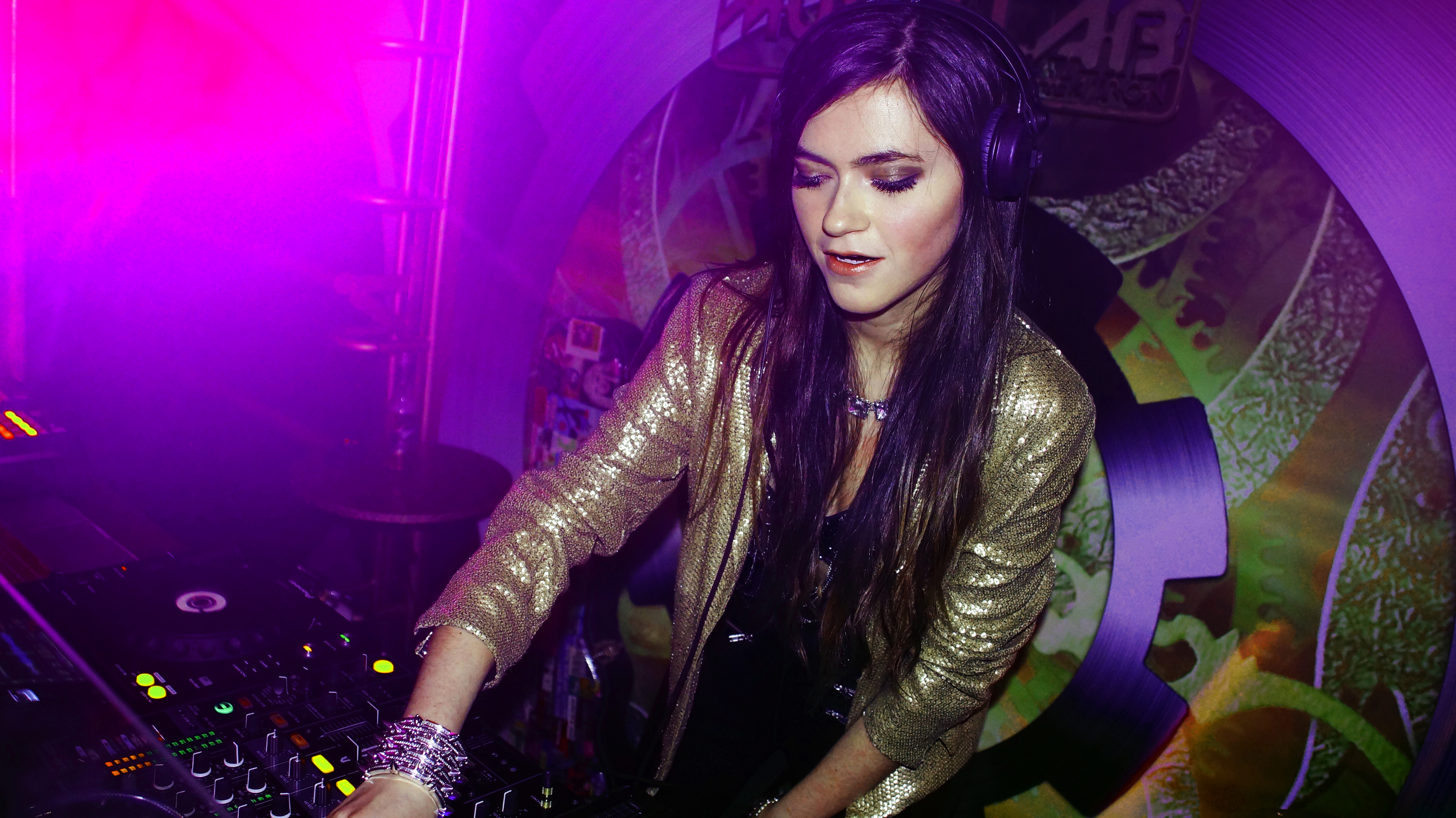
- Ali Stone playing in December 2015

Background information
- Born: c. 1992; Bogotá, Colombia
- Genres: Rock; Pop rock; Nu-metal; Alternative; Synthpop; Electronic; Pop; Soundtrack
- Occupations: Singer/songwriter; record producer; engineer; musician; film scorer; DJ
- Instruments: Vocals; piano; guitar; drums; bass; sitar; flute; ukulele
- Years active: 2013–present
- Website: alistonemusic.com

Alicia Gómez (born c. 1992), known professionally as Ali Stone, is a record producer, multi-instrumentalist, singer/songwriter, engineer, and DJ from Colombia. She has been named by Billboard as one of the Latin hitmakers of the past three years. Stone has produced, co-written and engineered songs with other music acts such as Alok, RBD, Diplo, Major Lazer, Mary J. Blige, Danna, Sofia Reyes, Paty Cantú, Francisca Valenzuela, among many others.

Stone has been nominated to the Latin Grammy Awards five times. In 2023, she was nominated for Best Pop/Rock Song with "Señorita Revolución" by Mexican artist Bruses. In 2024, she got nominated for Best Alternative Music Album with Pandora, Best Rock Song with "Camaleónica", and Best Pop/Rock Song with "Afilá", both belonging to her album Pandora. This was the first time in Latin Grammys history where an album made entirely by a single person got nominated to the awards. In 2025, she got nominated for Best Rock Song with "TRNA", from her album A Través Del Espejo.

Stone has also participated as producer and engineer in two albums nominated to the Grammy Awards. In 2021, the album Monstruo by Cami, where Stone worked as a producer, received a nomination for Best Latin Rock or Alternative Album. In 2024, the album MotherFlower by Flor De Toloache, where she worked as engineer, got nominated for Best Música Mexicana Album (Including Tejano).

Amongst her work, Stone has also scored films, performed live sets and DJ sets most recently at Lincoln Center and BMO Stadium. She also performed as one of the opening acts for Justin Bieber's Purpose World Tour.

== Early life and musical career ==
Ali Stone began to build her life around music from an early childhood. Being four years old, she began to play classical piano. A year later, she began to study the flute, as well as solphège and music theory in a music academy where she was quickly moved to higher-level courses due to her fast learning. At age seven, Ali began to play guitar with Juanes's guitarists, who submerged her into blues, jazz, rock, and metal. She then got to work as a guitarist for renowned multi-platinum producer Stephan Galfas (Kool and The Gang, Cher). Throughout her teenage years, Ali also learned to play the bass and the drums.

In 2013, Ali Stone participated in the contest to remix Disney's "Monsters University" soundtrack, and her work ended up being one of the winners. Axwell & Ingrosso said they had chosen Ali's remix because it was thought "out of the box". In 2014, Ali Stone composed and produced the complete original soundtrack of the thriller "Demental", turning her into one of the youngest female film scorers. Following this, she was chosen to participate in the campaign "Women Working for Women", belonging to the project "Empowering Women", which promotes gender equality on male-dominated jobs.

Earlier in 2015, Ali Stone released her first EP "More Obsessed" on Variety Magazine, consisting of four songs entirely written, produced, performed and engineered by her. Later, she released her single "Forever", which earned the position number 17 on Brazil's hot charts. After being named by Billboard as one of the five new artists to watch in 2016, Ali Stone released her single "Falling For You".

In 2017, Ali Stone performed at the Electric Daisy Carnival in Mexico City. She was also the opener for Justin Bieber's Purpose World Tour in Colombia's section of his Latin American shows. On May 26, 2017, Stone's debut album Sexto Sentido was released, consisting of 12 songs entirely written, produced, mixed and mastered by herself.

Since relocating to Los Angeles in 2018, Ali Stone has been writing and producing songs for the likes of Diplo, Major Lazer, Mary J. Blige, Danna, Sofia Reyes, RBD, among many others. In 2024, she was named by Spotify EQUAL as the Global Songwriter Ambassador. Stone's work now surpasses one billion streams worldwide. She has also become an active for young girls through organizations like We Are Moving The Needle, She Is The Music, Girls Make Beats and LiveNation.

== Discography ==
=== Albums ===
- Ali Stone - A Través Del Espejo
- Ali Stone - Pandora
- Ali Stone - Sexto Sentido
- Ali Stone - Demental (Original Motion Picture Soundtrack)

=== Singles & EP's ===
- Ali Stone - CRTA
- Ali Stone - LMNA
- Ali Stone - Lúmina
- Ali Stone - Serena
- Ali Stone - Perpetua
- Ali Stone - Afilá
- Ali Stone - Crudo
- Ali Stone - Umbra
- Ali Stone - En Mis Manos
- Ali Stone - Oculto
- Ali Stone - The Sweetest Death is Loving You
- Ali Stone - Follow Me
- Ali Stone - En Tu Piel
- Ali Stone - Dark Feelings ft. Sam I Am
- Ali Stone - Eres Tu
- Ali Stone - Falling For You
- Ali Stone - Forever
- Ali Stone - More Obsessed
- Ali Stone - Obsessions
- Ali Stone - Dark Spell
- Ali Stone - Summerlove
- Ali Stone - The First Time
- Ali Stone - More Than Words

=== Remixes ===
- Ke$ha - Crazy Kids (Ali Stone Remix)
- Monsters University - Roar (Ali Stone Remix)
- Katy Perry - Roar (Ali Stone Remix)
- Ellie Goulding - Burn (Ali Stone Remix)
- Krewella - We Are One (Ali Stone Remix)
- Alok & Mario Bautista - Toda La Noche (Ali Stone Remix)
