= Latin Grammy Award for Best Pop/Rock Song =

Music award category

- Awarded for: quality vocal or instrumental pop/rock music singles or tracks
- Country: United States
- Presented by: The Latin Recording Academy
- Currently held by: Rafa Arcaute, Renee Barri, Ca7riel & Paco Amoroso, Vicente Jimenez, Martin Kierszenbaum, John Ryan, Gordon Matthew Thomas Sumner & Federico Vindver for "Hasta Jesús Tuvo un Mal Día" (2026)
- Website: latingrammy.com

The Latin Grammy Award for Best Pop/Rock Song is an award presented annually by the Latin Academy of Recording Arts & Sciences at the Latin Grammy Awards.

The description of the category at the 2020 Latin Grammy Awards states that it "includes the genres of Trap and Dancehall Songs" and states that "a song must contain at least 51% of the lyrics in Spanish, Portuguese or languages/dialects of Hispano-America and must be a new song." The award is to the songwriter(s), with instrumental recordings, cover songs, remixes and interpolation/sampling recordings not eligible for the category.

The category was first awarded at the 21st Annual Latin Grammy Awards in 2020, with Fito Páez being the inaugural winner for writing his song "La Canción de las Bestias". Páez is also the only artist to have received the award more than once, with two wins.

== Recipients ==
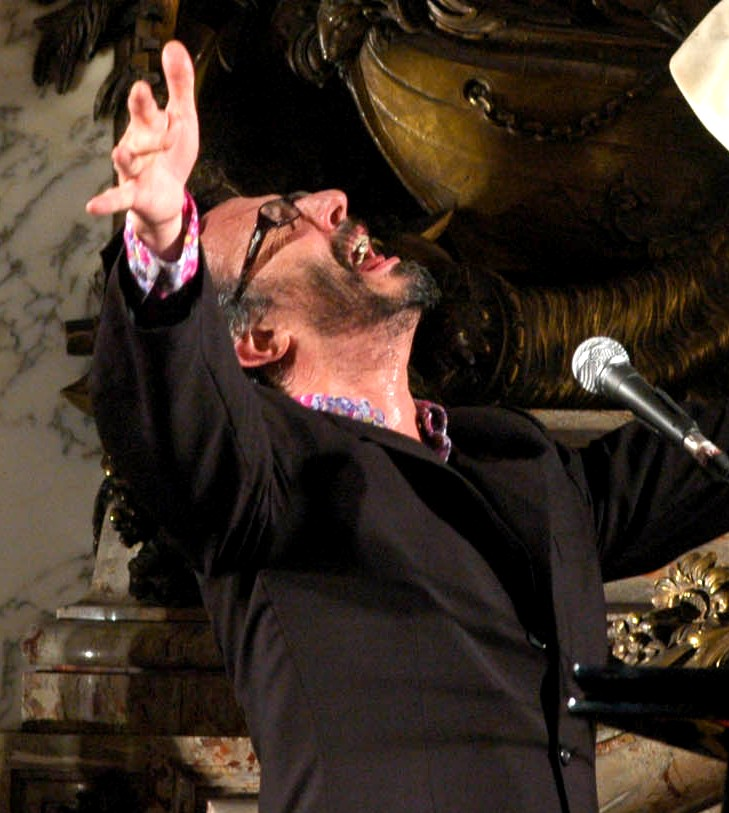
Two-time winner Fito Páez.

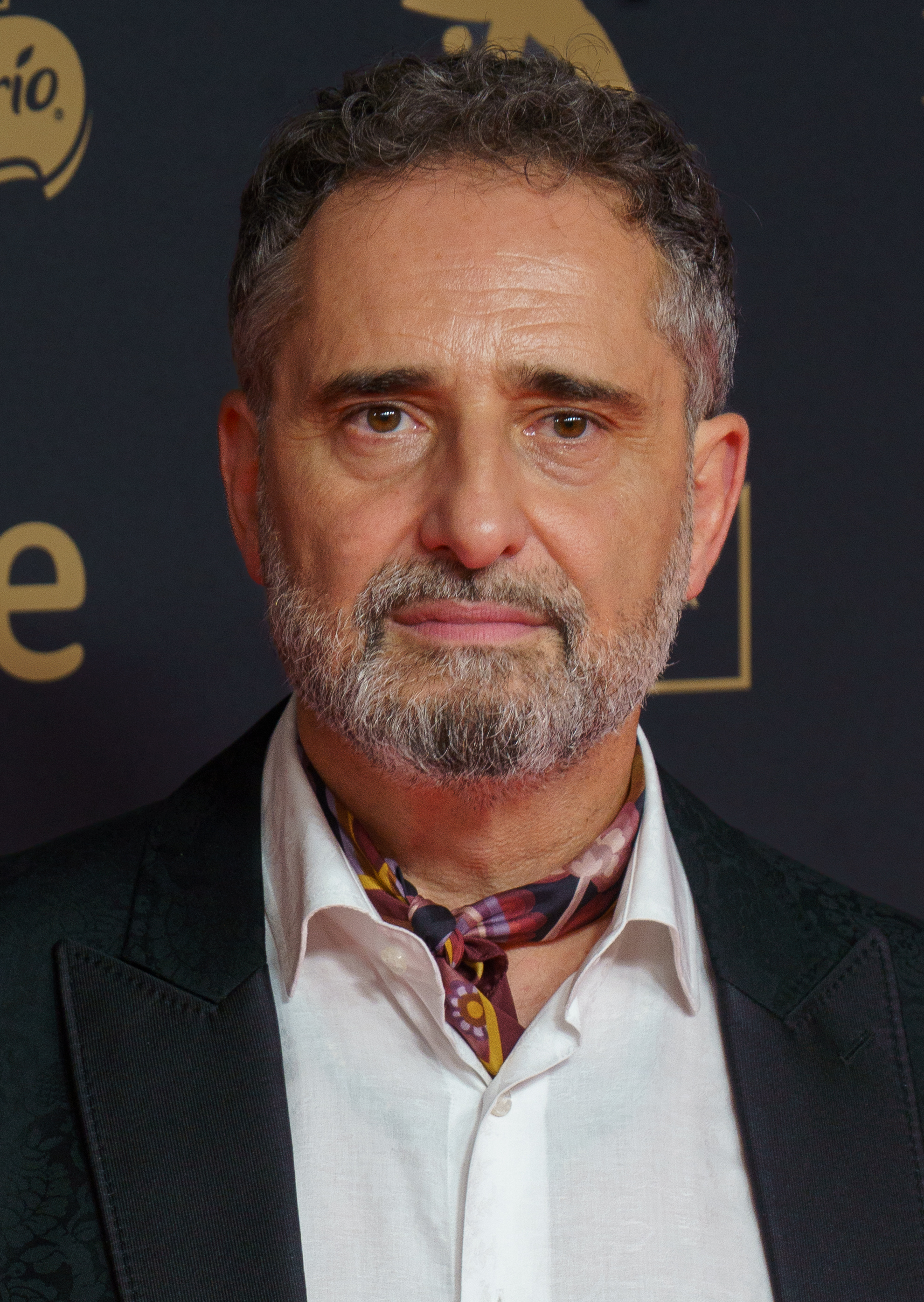
Jorge Drexler has won 2021 and 2025.

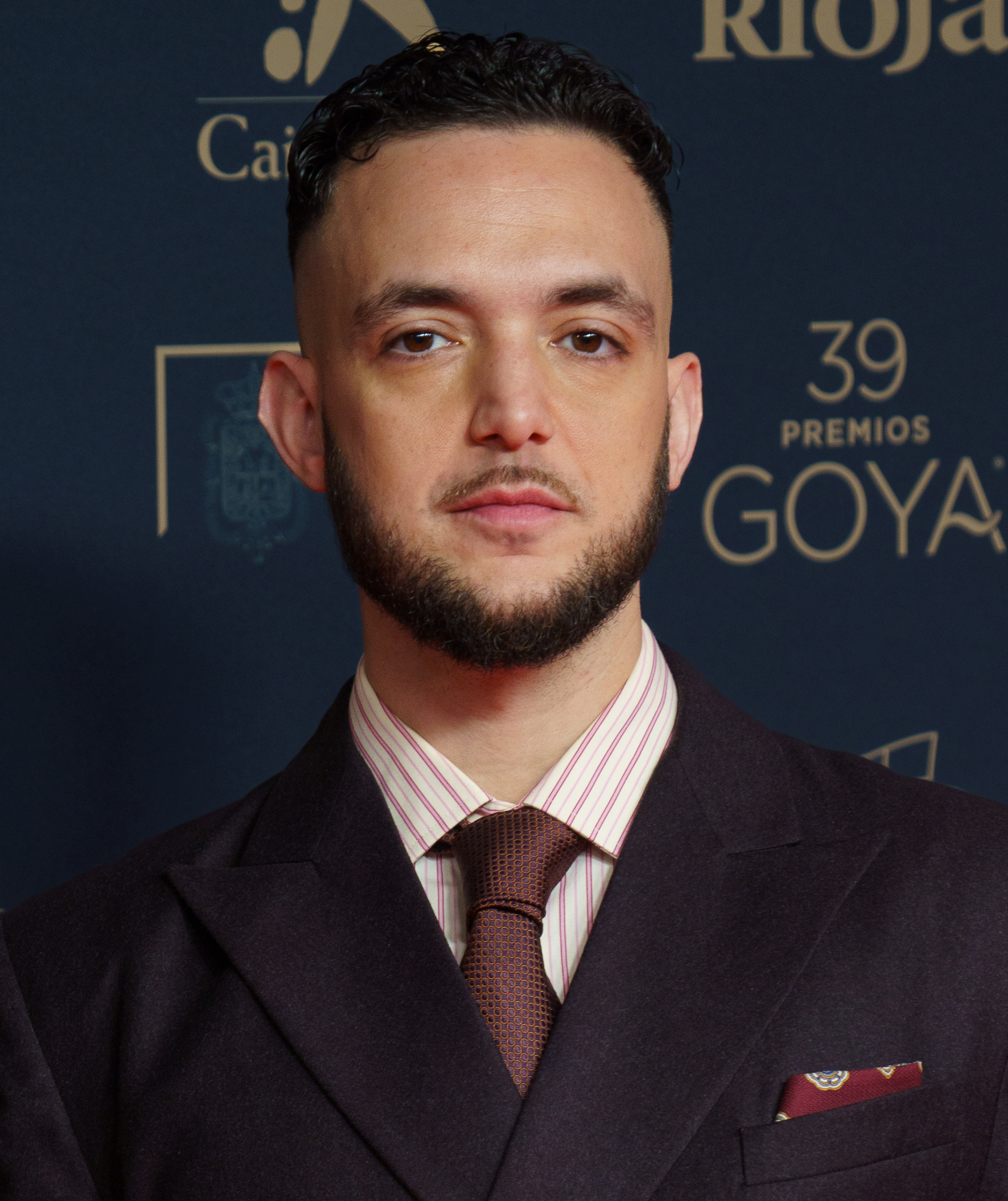
C. Tangana was one of the winners in 2021.

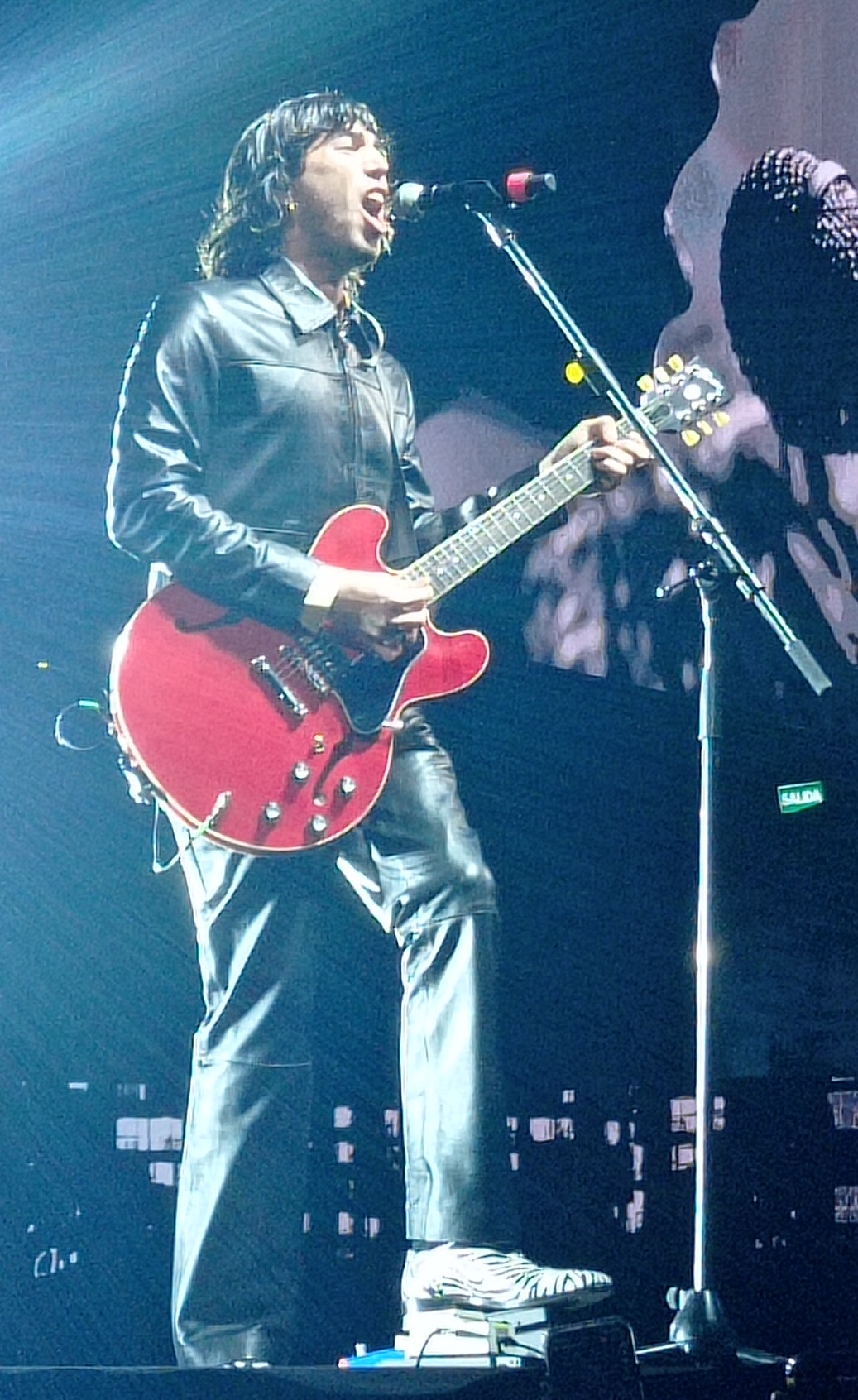
Two-time winner Conociendo Rusia.

| Year | Songwriter(s) | Work | Performing artist(s)^{[II]} | Nominees | Ref. |
|---|---|---|---|---|---|
| 2020 | Fito Páez | "La Canción de las Bestias" | Fito Páez | Pablo Diaz-Reixa, Frank Dukes, Rosalía & Matthew Tavares – "Dolerme" (Rosalía); Conociendo Rusia – "Quiero que me Llames" (Conociendo Rusia); Draco Rosa & Jaime Sabines – "Quiero Vivir" (Draco Rosa); Los Mesoneros – "Últimas Palabras" (Los Mesoneros) | |
| 2021 | Alizzz, Andrés Calamaro, Jorge Drexler, Víctor Martínez & C. Tangana | "Hong Kong" | C. Tangana and Andrés Calamaro | Diamante Eléctrico – "A Veces" (Diamante Eléctrico); Santi Balmes & Julián Saldarriaga – "Cosmos (Antisistema Solar)" (Love of Lesbian); Sergio Eduardo Acosta & León Larregui – "El Duelo" (Zoé); Zoe Gotusso, Nicolás Landa & Diego Mema – "Ganas" (Zoe Gotusso) | |
| 2022 | Carlos Vives & Fito Páez | "Babel" | Fito Páez & Carlos Vives | WOS & Facundo Yalve – "ARRANCARMELO" (WOS); Diego Castellano, Adrian Dargelos & Gustavo Torres – "Bye Bye" (Babasónicos); Felicitas Colina & Conociendo Rusia – "Disfraz" (Conociendo Rusia); Bruses, Elsa y Elmar & Alan Saucedo – "qué voy a hacer conmigo??" (Elsa y Elmar) | |
| 2023 | Luis Jiménez, Lasso & Agustín Zubillaga | "Ojos Marrones" | Lasso | Bunbury – "Alaska" (Bunbury); León Larregui – "Amantes" (León Larregui); Alex Anwandter & Julieta Venegas – "Caminar Sola" (Julieta Venegas); Francisca Valenzuela & Francisco Victoria – "¿Dónde Se Llora Cuando Se Llora?" (Francisca Valenzuela); Bruses & Ali Stone – "Señorita Revolución" (Bruses) | |
| 2024 | Conociendo Rusia & Natalia Lafourcade | "5 Horas Menos" | Conociendo Rusia featuring Natalia Lafourcade | Emmanuel Horvilleur, Siddhartha & Rul Velázquez – "Acapulco" (Siddhartha & Emmanuel Horvilleur); Ali Stone – "Afilá" (Ali Stone); Christian Mauricio Aloisio Zavala, Lagos & Elena Rose – "Blanco y Negro" (Lagos featuring Elena Rose); Los Mesoneros – "Diciembre" (Los Mesoneros) | |
| 2025 | Conociendo Rusia, Jorge Drexler & Pablo Drexler | "Desastres Fabulosos" | Jorge Drexler & Conociendo Rusia | Leiva – "Ángulo Muerto" (Leiva); Renzo Bravo, Lasso & Orlando Vitto – "Lucifer" (Lasso); Joaquina & Andry Kiddos – "No Llames lo Mío Nuestro" (Joaquina); Julián Bernal & Debi Nova – "Tu Manera de Amar" (Debi Nova); Leiva, Benjamín Prado & Joaquín Sabina – "Un Último Vals" (Joaquín Sabina) | |
| 2026 | Rafa Arcaute, Renee Barri, Ca7riel & Paco Amoroso, Vicente Jimenez, Martin Kierszenbaum, John Ryan, Gordon Matthew Thomas Sumner & Federico Vindver | "Hasta Jesús Tuvo un Mal Día" | Ca7riel & Paco Amoroso featuring Sting | Paty Cantú, Oscar Manuel Domínguez Montañez, Miguel Ángel Mendoza Arana & Fátima Carolina Valdez Lira – "Antes de Que el Mundo Se Acabe" (Paty Cantú); Leiva – "Hasta Que Me Quede Sin Voz" (Leiva); Arath Herce Blanco – "Me Levanté de la Cama" (Arath Herce); Bruses & Luis Javier Contreras – "Ratera" (Bruses) | |
