= Ya No Somos Los Mismos =

Studio album by Elsa y Elmar
- Released: April 28, 2022
- Genre: Latin pop; Pop rock
- Length: 43:51
- Language: Spanish
- Label: Sony Music Mexico
- Producer: Elsa Carvajal; Julián Bernal; Nico Cotton; Alizzz; Malay; Eduardo Cabra; Manuel Lara

Elsa y Elmar chronology
| Eres Diamante (2019) | Ya No Somos Los Mismos (2022) |

Singles from Ya No Somos Los Mismos
- 1. "Ya No Somos Los Mismos" Released: April 19, 2021; 2. "Hasta Dónde Se Enamora" Released: April 29, 2021; 3. "Corazones Negros" Released: July 1, 2021; 4. "Cómo Acaba" Released: October 21, 2021; 5. "Último y Primero" Released: December 6, 2021; 6. "Atravesao" Released: January 27, 2022

Ya No Somos Los Mismos (stylized in all lowercase) is the third studio album by Colombian singer and songwriter Elsa y Elmar, released on April 28, 2022, through Sony Music Mexico. It was produced by Elsa y Elmar (Elsa Carvajal) herself, alongside Julián Bernal and Nico Cotton, with Alizzz, Malay, Eduardo Cabra and Manuel Lara also having production credits in some tracks. Colombian salsa singer Joe Arroyo makes a posthumous appearance in the album as a featured artist.

The album was supported by six singles: "Ya No Somos Los Mismos", "Hasta Dónde Se Enamora", "Corazones Negros", "Cómo Acaba", "Último y Primero" and "Atravesao". It was also accompanied by a short film featuring some songs from the album.

At the 23rd Annual Latin Grammy Awards, the album was nominated for both Album of the Year and Best Pop Vocal Album. Additionally, Julián Bernal, Nico Cotton, Carlitos González, Alberto Hernández, Michel Kuri, Malay, Felipe Mejía, Jv Olivier, Juan Sebastián Parra, Alejandro García Partida, Alan Saucedo, Raúl López, Lewis Pickett, Harold Sanders and Dave Kutch, all were nominated for Best Engineered Album as engineers and mixers of the album. The album's success also led Carvajal to be nominated for New Artist – Female at the Premios Lo Nuestro 2023 and for Best Alternative/Rock/Indie Artist at the Premios Nuestra Tierra 2022.

== Background ==
Prior to the release of the album, Carvajal had been living in Mexico for four years. During the pandemic, she released the six-song EP Cuatro Veces 10 (2020), composed while she was in confinement alone in Mexico. Ya No Somos Los Mismos was first announced by Carvajal through her Instagram account with a video where she recites a poem about missing someone while feeling nostalgia and hope for a new future. The video was directed by Jorge Leyva and produced by Lilia Velazco, who worked alongside the production company La Turca Films.

== Composition ==
The album came after a period of writer's block in which Carvajal questioned whether she was going to continue with the musical project of Elsa y Elmar. According to Carvajal, it was "a process of defining what Elsa and Elmar is, what it sounds like, and trusting that if you make music for the right reasons and with an honest intention, something beautiful will come out". While her previous album Eres Diamante (2019) was about "exploring her individuality", Ya No Somos Los Mismos dealt with "experimenting as a woman, producer, composer, unique, fragile and resilient".

Production was handled mainly by Carvajal herself alongside Mexican producer Julián Bernal and Argentine producer Nico Cotton. Other producers involved in the album include Spanish producer Alizzz in "Corazones Negros", American producer Malay in "Como Acaba" and "Y No Llora", and Puerto Rican producer Eduardo Cabra in "Atravesao". Additionally, Argentine singer Claudia Brant serves as songwriter for the tracks "Hasta Dónde Se Enamora", "Y No Llora" and "Cómo Acaba", Dominican singer Vicente García appears in "Atravesao" as a songwriter and guest vocalist, and Argentine singer Leonel García of Sin Bandera co-wrote "Vuelve".

Ya No Somos Los Mismos talks about the various stages that people go through after a break-up, from falling in love to the end of the relationship. It was inspired by a "difficult separation" in Carvajal's life. The album opens with "Amantes y Amigos" which deals with losing someone and how relationships change, this is also referenced in the album's title, which translates to "We are no longer the same". It is followed by "Vuelve", considered by Carvajal as "the most important song in the album". The song has been described as a "supplication that in the end becomes the acceptance of a situation and the moment to letting it go". "Corazones Negros" talks about facing the reality of the break-up while "Hasta Dónde Se Enamora", a song inspired in the 90s' power ballads, talks about realizing the path that the relationship is taking. Acceptance and forgiveness is discussed in tracks such as "Cómo Acaba", which talks about the feeling of overcoming the situation and accepting all the moments lived through the relationship, "Primavera", about carrying on with life, and the final track "Gracias", where Carvajal reflects on the relationship and decides to finish it being thankful instead of vengeful or angry.

Carvajal's Colombian origins are also discussed in the album through various references including the tracks "Rompas", which includes audios from the 2021 Colombian protests, "No Todo Fue Tan Malo // Ya No Somos Los Mismos", which features an audio of Guillermina, the woman who raised and looked after Carvajal while her parents were working, and "Tal Para Cual", where the only featured artist in the album makes an appearance. "Tal Para Cual" features Colombian salsa singer Joe Arroyo, the song itself is a cover of a song by Arroyo.

== Promotion ==
=== Singles ===
The album spawned six singles. Five of them were released through 2021: "Ya No Somos Los Mismos" on April 19, "Hasta Dónde Se Enamora" on April 29, "Corazones Negros" on July 1, "Cómo Acaba" on October 21, and "Último y Primero" on December 6. On January 27, 2022, the last single "Atravesao" was released. The singles were accompanied with their respective music videos. In addition, a 40-minute film was also released to YouTube on May 19, 2022, featuring some of the songs from the album.

=== Touring ===
In February 2022, Carvajal performed a series of concerts in Colombia where she sang the singles released as that moment from the album. The venues included the Movistar Arena in Bogotá and the Teatro Metropolitano at Medellín, both as a headliner for Zoé's tour Sonidos de Karmática Resonancia. To promote the album, Carvajal embarked in the YNSLM Tour, which started on February 17, 2023, in Puebla, Mexico and included the Mexican cities of Querétaro, Monterrey, Tijuana, Hermosillo and Guadalajara. It also included her performances in the music festivals Lollapalooza Chile, Lollapalooza Argentina, Vive Latino in Mexico City and Festival Estéreo Picnic in Bogotá.

== Critical reception ==
Upon release, the album received positive reviews from critics, praising Carvajal's lyrics and authenticity. Fabián Páez from the Colombian website Shock ranked the album as the best Colombian album of 2022 calling it "authentic" while writing that the songs "feel generous and warm, sliding through bachata, dembow and the sweetest pop ballads with ease". Páez also ranked "Atravesao" as the second best Colombian song of 2022. Rolling Stone called the album "visceral, painful and authentic", calling the songs "the ideal partners in the path of finding oneself again". Jessica Roiz from Billboard wrote that the album "picks up fourteen mature and reflexive songs, each with their own powerful message". She also highlighted the song "Vuelve", calling it "an outstanding alternative pop moment that perfectly shows the wise decision of two lovers that are no longer good for each other".

=== Year-end lists ===
| Publication | Accolade | Rank | Ref. |
|---|---|---|---|
| Shock | 50 Best Colombian Albums of 2022 | 1 | |
| Rolling Stone | 22 Greatest Albums in Spanish of 2022 | N/A | |
| Billboard | 25 Best Latin Music Albums of 2022 | N/A | |

== Track listing ==
Ya No Somos Los Mismos track listing
| No. | Title | Writer(s) | Producer(s) | Length |
|---|---|---|---|---|
| 1. | "Amantes y Amigos" | Elsa Carvajal | Elsa Carvajal; Julián Bernal | 3:51 |
| 2. | "Vuelve" | Carvajal; Leonel García | Carvajal; Bernal; Nico Cotton | 3:21 |
| 3. | "Corazones Negros" | Carvajal; Julián Bernal; Luis Jinénez | Alizzz | 2:49 |
| 4. | "A Tu Ladito" | Carvajal | Carvajal; Bernal | 3:29 |
| 5. | "Y No Lloro" | Carvajal; Claudia Brant | Bernal; Malay | 2:29 |
| 6. | "Hasta Dónde Se Enamora" | Carvajal; Brant | Bernal; Cotton | 2:47 |
| 7. | "Cómo Acaba" | Carvajal; Brant | Bernal; Malay | 3:44 |
| 8. | "Tal Para Cual" (featuring Joe Arroyo) | Álvaro José Arroyo | Carvajal; Bernal | 2:07 |
| 9. | "Último y Primero" | Carvajal; Bernal | Cotton | 2:59 |
| 10. | "Atravesao" | Carvajal; Bernal; Vicente García Guillén; Eduardo Cabra | Bernal; Eduardo Cabra | 3:20 |
| 11. | "Rompas" | Carvajal; Manuel Lara | Carvajal; Bernal; Manuel Lara | 3:19 |
| 12. | "Primavera" | Carvajal; Joel Mathias Isaksson; Oskar Lars Gustav Nyman; Pablo Preciado; Ramses Guillermo Meneses Lozada | Cotton | 3:16 |
| 13. | "No Todo Fue Malo // Ya No Somos Los Mismos" | Carvajal | Carvajal; Bernal | 2:30 |
| 14. | "Gracias" | Carvajal | Carvajal; Bernal | 3:43 |
| Total length: | | | | 43:51 |

=== Notes ===
- All tracks are stylized in all lowercase.
