= Marchita =

Studio album by Silvana Estrada
- Released: January 21, 2022
- Recorded: 2019
- Genre: Indie pop; classical; jazz; Latin American folk
- Length: 37:04
- Language: Spanish
- Label: Glassnote
- Producer: Gustavo Guerrero; Daniel Zepeda

Silvana Estrada chronology
Charlie Hunter/Carter McLean Featuring Silvana Estrada (2018)	Marchita (2022)	Abrazo (2022)

Singles from Marchita
- 1. "Marchita" Released: July 30, 2021; 2. "Tristeza" Released: September 23, 2021; 3. "Te guardo" Released: October 22, 2021; 4. "La corriente" Released: December 1, 2021

Marchita (Spanish for "withered") is the debut solo studio album by Mexican singer-songwriter Silvana Estrada, following two collaborative albums with Charlie Hunter. The album was released January 21, 2022, as her debut release with Glassnote Records. The album was recorded in Mexico City over five days in 2019 with producer Gustavo Guerrero.

== Background ==
Estrada first announced the album October 22, 2021, alongside the release of the single "Te guardo", a rerecording of a song that first appeared on the singer's debut EP Primeras Canciones. The album was first conceived after the breakup of Estrada's first relationship, with the lyrics following her journey through first heartbreak. Estrada called the album "like a therapeutic journey ... in order to understand sadness, loneliness, and pain." Estrada called the writing process behind the album "really lonely", explaining that "I started it after a breakup, and it wasn't only the breakup and the dissolution of a relationship — I think I was suffering because I realized love wasn't what I thought it was. It was a kind of pain that was philosophical, so Marchita was an introspective journey that I took to find out what my truth was and my construction of love and why I was feeling so bad."

In an interview with the Chicago Sun-Times's Laura Emerick, Estrada explained why the cuatro is so central to the album, saying "It was magical that I got to know the cuatro. A regular guitar was too big, and my hands were too small. I needed something different. I started to play it, and I fell deeply in love. The tuning [of the cuatro] is so special. It sounds unique — modern but also folkloric. My mind was blown away." The cuatro she plays was made by her luthier father.

The album's lyrics, originally written in Spanish, received an official English translation by bilingual Mexican poet Mónica Mansour. Estrada started writing some of the songs in 2018, refining them at local concerts so that she had a deep understanding of them by the time she entered the studio with producer Gustavo Guerrero. Guerrero had a goal of recreating the intimacy of those live performances, which he described as "a challenge not to take away the power and expression of Silvana's art", constantly facing the risk of "overproducing or over-polishing something that's already done" or adding excessive layers of instrumentation.

== Singles and music videos ==
The album was preceded by four singles released in 2021: the title track on July 30, "Tristeza" on September 23, "Te guardo" on October 22, and "La corriente" on December 1. The first three singles also received music videos directed by Karla Read and Edwin Erazo working with director of photography Julio Llorente, all shot in black-and-white and set in the countryside of the Dominican Republic's Valle Nuevo National Park.

== Style and reception ==
Marchita ratings
Review scores
Source	Rating
AllMusic	4/5 stars
The Brock Press	5/5 stars
Rolling Stone	4/5 stars

Rolling Stone called the album "gorgeously understated, guided by [Estrada's] gauzy voice and rich, acoustic arrangements" and "thrill[ing] in simplicity." AllMusic's Thom Jurek describes the album's lineup as including strings, brass, reeds, guitars, keyboard, percussion, and Estrada's voice and cuatro playing, and notes the project as "mak[ing] use of her entire musical background, including indie pop, classical, jazz, and Latin American folk traditions." Jurek calls the album "rendered simply and directly, deeply influenced by the poetic tradition of women composers including Chavela Vargas, Violeta Parra, and Soledad Bravo", and goes on to highlight moments such as "Un Día Cualquie"'s "soaring promise of possibility above a Farfisa organ and percussion choir"; "Sabré Olvidar" which "is a spacy, intimate ranchera with vibraphone, upright bass, and a string quartet"; the title track on which "rage flows freely though Estrada's lyrics, though her voice remains sweet with sadness as cuatro and string quartet buoy her protagonist toward healing"; and the "vanguard sounds on "Casa" [which] recall some of Björk's more experimental moments as Estrada sums up her experiences with searing honesty." Jurek closes by saying "Marchita's songs are solid, provocative, and deeply moving. Through them all, Estrada's open, aching, vulnerable voice remains fierce and fearless. She carries her heartbreak and healing with honesty and courage and exhorts us to do the same."

Per The Brock Press's Haytham Nawaz, the album "sonically channels [Estrada's] Mexican heritage into an intimate bundle of private, intense songs that meditate on heartbreak", with "stunning originality [which] enters this Hispanic artist into the pantheon of legendary singer/songwriters." Estrada's voice is at the center of the music, made "most apparent in the melismatic hooks, where the 24-year-old singer's voice subordinates every mirrored chord, yet the instrumentals sound like they could drown out her voice at any moment. Though never successfully flipping the dynamic, her voice remains dominant", with "Sabré Olvidar" last two minutes being the "most breathtaking example of this interplay" where an "explosion of chamber folk instrumentation is tailing Esrada's melodic twists and turns." The album, per Estrada's word, is "about her first love and the naivete that made (and makes) that first heartbreak so devastating", and "the way her voice is completely in command of the instrumentals is a sign of the torrential feelings that accompany every utterance that tries to explain such a shattering experience." Nawaz notes that "Ser De Ti"'s double bass "curtails the rest of the instrumentation to create a womb-like effect ... reminiscent of Kate Bush's classic song "Mother Stands for Comfort", seconds Jurek's comparison for "Casa", claiming it "could fit on Bjӧrk's Vespertine with its domestic ambience and almost painful, angelic tension, relieved finally by an almost ecclesiastical violin outro at the nearly three-minute mark", and closes by saying the album "entirely its own experience", with its "Spanish roots not "relied on to do the leg-work, rather ... woven into a series of well-established, variegated forms of popular western singer-songwriter music."

Al Día's Andrew Kolba notes album closer "La enfermedad del siglo" containing an instrumental reprise of opener "Mas o menos antes" played on flugelhorn and organ, "marking a moment of coming full-circle." The New York Times's Isabelia Herrera called the album "an intimate, austere record, a tender snapshot of a young woman wrestling with the pain of lost love" on which Estrada's "rolling melismas, the warm melancholy of the cuatro and her imagistic, somber lyrics cascade into torrents of unbridled anguish. Throughout, Estrada submerges herself in misery, often leaving the listener bereft." Estrada's lyrics "unfurl with a poetic magnetism that blooms in Spanish" and "often echo the romantic textures of the Nicaraguan poet Rubén Darío, or perhaps the Uruguayan poet and critic Idea Vilariño."

=== Accolades ===
==== Awards ====
Marchita awards
Year	Organization	Award	Status	Ref.
2022	Latin Grammy Awards	Best Singer-Songwriter Album	Nominated	
2023	Libera Awards	Best Latin Record	Nominated	
2023	Rolling Stone en Español Awards	Album of the Year	Nominated	

==== Year-end lists ====
Marchita year-end lists
Publication	#	Ref.
Billboard	24	
The Needle Drop	10	
NPR Music	13	
Rolling Stone	68	

== Track listing ==
All tracks are written by Silvana Estrada.

Marchita track listing
No.	Title	Length
1.	"Más o menos antes"	2:15
2.	"La corriente"	3:32
3.	"Te guardo"	3:22
4.	"Un día cualquiera"	2:23
5.	"Sabré olvidar"	4:30
6.	"Marchita"	3:47
7.	"Tristeza"	3:01
8.	"Carta"	3:25
9.	"Casa"	4:40
10.	"Ser de ti"	3:28
11.	"La enfermedad del siglo"	2:41
Total length:		37:04

== Personnel ==
- Silvana Estrada – vocals, cuatro
- Gustavo Guerrero – producer, percussion, backing vocals
- Daniel Zepeda – producer
- Edwin Erazo – executive producer
- Juanma Trujillo – conductor
- Sona Poshotyan – cello
- Diego Franco – clarinet, tenor saxophone
- Luri Molina – double bass
- José Andrés Marquez – drums, percussion
- Alfredo Pino Cruz – flugelhorn
- Roberto Verástegui – organ, piano, keyboards
- Andrés Tirado and Jorge Tirado – percussion
- Ángel Medina – viola
- Sergei Gorbenko and Sergei Kossiak – violin
- JC Vertti – recording engineer, percussion
- Daniel Bitrán Arizpe – recording and mixing engineer, percussion
- Ronaldo Alatorre – assistant recording engineer
- Greg Calbi – mastering engineer
