= Ángela Álvarez =

Cuban-born American singer (1927–2024)

Angela Alvarez
- Born: June 13, 1927; Camagüey, Cuba
- Died: December 6, 2024 (aged 97) Baton Rouge, Louisiana, U.S.
- Spouse: Orlando Alvarez (died 1977)
- Website: www.angelaalvarez.com

Ángela Álvarez (June 13, 1927 – December 6, 2024) was a Cuban-born American singer and the oldest Latin Grammy Award for Best New Artist winner ever. She shared the 2022 award with Silvana Estrada at the 23rd Annual Latin Grammy Awards.

Her songs were first recorded on an album produced by her grandson, film composer and producer Carlos José Alvarez.

Álvarez appeared in the 2022 remake of Father of the Bride (which stars Andy Garcia) singing the beloved Cuban musical standard "Quiéreme mucho".

== Life and career ==
Álvarez was born in Camagüey, Cuba, on June 13, 1927. She developed an interest in music early on in her life.

Álvarez came to the United States in 1965 and took up a job as a bank janitor. Her four children were able to come into the United States in 1962 as part of Monsignor Bryan Walsh’s Operation Pedro Pan. They spent three years in an orphanage in Pueblo, Colorado before her arrival. While living in the United States, Álvarez took up residency in Baton Rouge, Louisiana, where her late husband found work as a mechanical engineer in the sugar industry. Prior to settling in Baton Rouge, Álvarez's husband, who had also been forced to wait behind, reunited with the family in Mexico, and then hopped around Houston, Miami, Louisiana, Puerto Rico, Guatemala, and El Salvador before getting his well-paying job in Baton Rouge. Both her husband and only daughter died from cancer years before her. Prior to her death, Álvarez's daughter, who died of cancer in 1999, married, with her wedding day marking the first time Álvarez sang her song, Maria. At the time of her death in December 2024, she had three living children, nine grandchildren, and 15 great-grandchildren.

As of 2023, Álvarez was still living in the same Baton Rouge home where she had lived from 1972.

On December 6, 2024, Álvarez died in Baton Rouge at the age of 97.
