= Mateo Sujatovich =

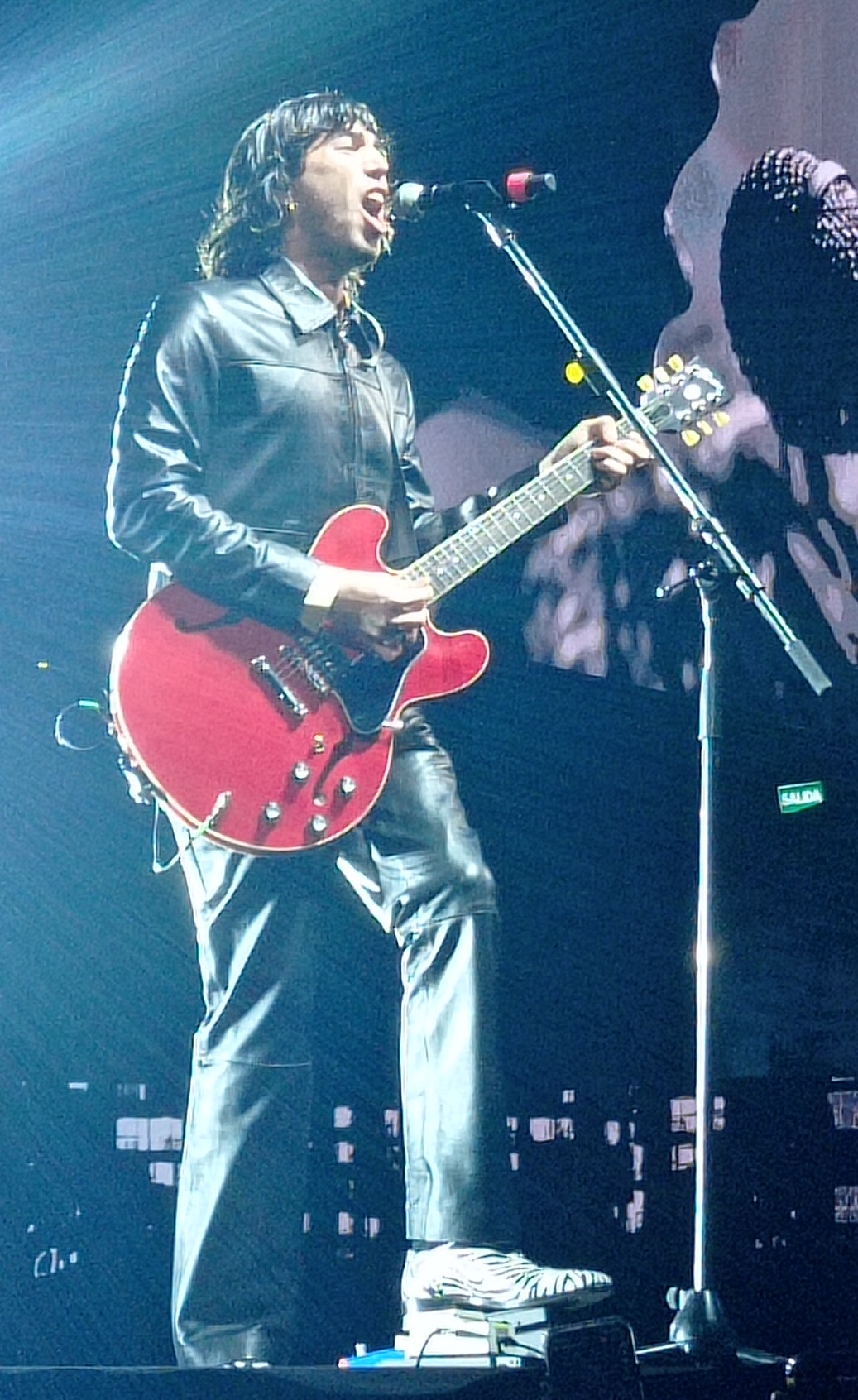
- Sujatovich in 2022

Background information
- Born: 18 January 1991 (age 35); Buenos Aires, Argentina
- Occupation: Musician
- Years active: 2018-present

Mateo Sujatovich (born 18 January 1991), also known for the musical project Conociendo Rusia, is an Argentine musician. As Conociendo Rusia he has released three albums, his homonymous debut in 2018, Cabildo y Juramento in 2019 and La Dirección in 2021. He has received several awards and nominations for the Gardel Awards and Latin Grammy Awards, including Best New Artist at the 21st Annual Latin Grammy Awards.

== Career ==
Sujatovich alongside his band Conociendo Rusia, whose name comes from his nickname "El Ruso", released his debut album Conociendo Rusia in 2018, accompanied by Nicolas Btesh (synthesizers and backing vocals), Guille Salort (drums) and Fran Azorai (keyboards). The next year, they released their second album, Cabildo y Juramento, which featured production from Nicolás Cotton and arrangements by Leo Sujatovich, the album was nominated for Best Pop/Rock Album at the 21st Annual Latin Grammy Awards. At the Gardel Awards of 2020, the project was nominated for Album of the Year while Cotton was nominated for Producer of the Year and Record Engineer of the Year with Pablo López Ruiz.

Due to the COVID-19 pandemic, the band had to postpone their concert at the Teatro Gran Rex in Buenos Aires and decided to make a series of virtual concerts under the name E-World Tour in 2020 to promote the second album. In 2020, they released "Tu Encanto", a collaboration with Argentine singer Fito Páez.

In May 2025, Sujatovich and fellow Argentine singer Nathy Peluso released the collaborative track "Perfecto Final."

== Influences ==
Among his influences, Sujatovich mentions the British band The Beatles alongside Argentine rock singers such as Luis Alberto Spinetta, Charly García and Gustavo Cerati. His work has been described by critics as a continuation of the Argentine rock tradition, blending classic rock influences with contemporary pop. Sujatovich has also cited Fito Páez as a key reference in both songwriting and performance style.

== Personal life ==
Sujatovich is the son of the Argentine musician and keyboardist of the band Spinetta Jade, Leo Sujatovich, with whom he shares a recording studio they called "Club Atlético Sujatovich". His sister is the singer and songwriter Luna Sujatovich.

He was born in the Buenos Aires barrio of Belgrano. He is of Jewish descent.

== Discography ==
- Conociendo Rusia (2018)
- Cabildo y Juramento (2019)
- La Dirección (2021)
- Jet Love (2024)

=== Singles ===
- "Perfecto Final" (2025) (with Nathy Peluso)

== Awards and nominations ==
| Award | Year | Category | Nominated work | Result | Ref. |
|---|---|---|---|---|---|
| Latin Grammy Awards | 2020 | Best New Artist | Conociendo Rusia | Nominated | |
| Latin Grammy Awards | 2020 | Best Pop/Rock Album | Cabildo y Juramento | Nominated | |
| Latin Grammy Awards | 2020 | Best Pop/Rock Song | "Quiero que me Llames" | Nominated | |
| Latin Grammy Awards | 2022 | Best Pop/Rock Song | "Disfraz" | Nominated | |
| Latin Grammy Awards | 2022 | Best Pop/Rock Album | La Dirección | Nominated | |
| Latin Grammy Awards | 2024 | Best Pop/Rock Album | Jet Love | Nominated | |
| Latin Grammy Awards | 2024 | Best Pop/Rock Song | "5 Horas Menos" (with Natalia Lafourcade) | Won | |
| Latin Grammy Awards | 2025 | Best Pop/Rock Song | "Desastres Fabulosos" (with Jorge Drexler) | Pending | |
| Latin Grammy Awards | 2025 | Record of the Year | "Desastres Fabulosos" (with Jorge Drexler) | Pending | |
| Premios Gardel | 2019 | Best New Artist | Conociendo Rusia | Nominated | |
| Premios Gardel | 2019 | Best Alternative Pop Album | Conociendo Rusia | Won | |
| Premios Gardel | 2020 | Album of the Year | Cabildo y Juramento | Nominated | |
| Premios Gardel | 2020 | Best New Artist | Cabildo y Juramento | Nominated | |
| Premios Gardel | 2020 | Best Rock Group Album | Cabildo y Juramento | Nominated | |
| Premios Gardel | 2020 | Song of the Year | "Quiero que me Llames" | Nominated | |
| Premios Gardel | 2024 | Record of the Year | "La Rueda Mágica – EADDA9223" (with Fito Páez and Andrés Calamaro) | Won | |
| Premios Gardel | 2024 | Best Pop Song | "Pelo Suelto" (with Elsa y Elmar) | Nominated | |
| Premios Nuestra Tierra | 2024 | Best Rock/Alternative/Indie Song | "Pelo Suelto" (with Elsa y Elmar) | Nominated | |
