= Moogie Canazio =

Brazilian record producer (1955–2026)

- Born: Antonio Canazio; September 21, 1955; Rio de Janeiro, Brazil
- Died: April 21, 2026 (aged 70) Los Angeles, California, U.S.
- Occupations: Mixing engineer; recording engineer; record producer

Antonio "Moogie" Canazio (September 21, 1955 – April 21, 2026) was a Brazilian recording engineer, mixing engineer and record producer known for his work with Antônio Carlos Jobim, Caetano Veloso, Ivan Lins, João Gilberto, Ray Charles, Sarah Vaughan and Luis Miguel.

Canazio won two Grammy Awards, five Latin Grammy Awards, and two Midsouth Emmy Awards. He later served as vice-chairman of the Latin Recording Academy Board of Trustees and as chairman of the Latin Recording Academy Circle of Producers and Engineers (CPI), equivalent to the Recording Academy Producers and Engineers Wing.

== Life and career ==
Canazio was born on September 21, 1955 in Rio de Janeiro, Brazil and started as a DJ there. Soon, following his desire to play music, he started playing the drums.

In 1978, he moved to Los Angeles to pursue a career as a recording engineer. He enrolled in sound engineering courses and started doing office work at Kendun Recorders in Burbank. Soon, he became assistant engineer, recording artists including George Benson, Chicago and REO Speedwagon.

He moved back to Rio de Janeiro in 1981. He worked at the record label Som Livre recording música popular brasileira (MPB). In 1989, Canazio returned to Los Angeles. In 1992 he became the first Brazilian engineer to be nominated in the "Best Engineered Album – non classical" category at the Grammy Awards for his work in Sergio Mendes' album Brasileiro. He was nominated again in this same category in 1996 and 2012.

Canazio was nominated nine times in the "Best Engineered Album – non classical" category at the Latin Grammy Awards, winning the award at the 9th Annual Latin Grammy Awards in 2008. He was nominated for the Latin Grammy Award for the Producer of the Year at the 7th and 13th Latin Grammy Awards in 2006 and 2013, respectively.

Canazio died on April 21, 2026, at the age of 70.

== Awards ==
=== Grammy Awards ===
Year	Title	Artist	Category	Role	Result
1993	Brasileiro	Sergio Mendes	Best Engineered Album – non classical	Engineer	Nominated
1997	Oceano	Sergio Mendes	Best Engineered Album – non classical	Engineer	Nominated
2001	João Voz e Violão	João Gilbero	Best World Music Album	Engineer	Won
2013	The Absence	Melody Gardot	Best Engineered Album – non classical	Engineer	Nominated
2019	Sincera	Claudia Brant	Best Latin Pop Album	Producer, engineer	Won

=== Latin Grammy Awards ===
Year	Title	Artist	Category	Role	Result
2000	João Voz e Violão	João Gilberto	Best Engineered Album	Engineer	Nominated
2000	Livro	Caetano Veloso	Album of the Year	Engineer/mixer	Nominated
2001	Noites do Norte	Caetano Veloso	Best Engineered Album	Engineer	Nominated
2002	Sandy & Junior	Sandy & Junior	Best Engineered Album	Engineer	Nominated
2004	Brasileirinho	Maria Bethânia	Best Engineered Album	Engineer	Nominated
2005	Cantando Histórias	Ivan Lins	Album of the Year	Producer, engineer, mastering engineer	Won
2005	Cantando Histórias	Ivan Lins	Best MPB Album	Producer, engineer, mastering engineer	Won
2006	Simone – Ao Vivo	Simone	Best Long Form Music Video	Video producer	Nominated
2006	Himself		Producer of the Year		Nominated
2008	Dentro do Mar Tem Rio – Ao Vivo	Maria Bethânia	Best Engineered Album	Engineer, mastering engineer	Won
2009	Em Londres	Roupa Nova	Best Portuguese Language Contemporary Pop Album	Co-producer	Won
2010	Tua	Maria Bethânia	Best Engineered Album	Engineer, mastering engineer	Nominated
2010	Tua	Maria Bethânia	Record of the Year	Engineer/mixer	Nominated
2011	Manuscrito	Sandy	Best Engineered Album	Engineer	Nominated
2012	Sinfônico 40 Anos	Chitãozinho & Xororó	Best Sertaneja Music Album	Engineer, mixer, mastering engineer	Won
2012	Himself		Producer of the Year		Nominated
2016	Like Nice	Celso Fonseca	Best Engineered Album	Engineer	Nominated
2016	Derivacivilização	Ian Ramil	Best Portuguese Language Rock Album	Mixer	Won
2016	Himself		Producer of the Year		Nominated
2017	Zanna	Zanna	Best Engineered Album	Engineer	Nominated
2017	Himself		Producer of the Year		Nominated
2019	O Tempo É Agora	Anavitória	Best Portuguese Language Contemporary Pop Album	Engineer	Won

=== Midsouth Emmy Awards ===
Canazio won two Midsouth Emmy Awards for his work on The Passion for Music and Heart of Inspiration.
