= Silvana Estrada =

Mexican singer-songwriter (born 1997)

- Estrada in the press room of the 27th Annual Latin Grammy Awards, 2026

Background information
- Born: April 15, 1997 (age 29); Coatepec, Veracruz, Mexico
- Occupation: Singer-songwriter
- Years active: 2017–present
- Label: Glassnote

Silvana Estrada (born April 15, 1997) is a Mexican singer-songwriter. She has released three albums, including two with collaboration from musician Charlie Hunter. She has worked with artists like Natalia Lafourcade, Caloncho, Alex Cuba, and Guitarricadelafuente, among others.

== Early life ==
Estrada was born in Coatepec, Veracruz in Mexico. Her parents were both luthiers. She began playing music at a young age, later performing in different bars from her hometown. At 16, she was accepted into a jazz program at the Universidad Veracruzana in Xalapa, Veracruz. While she was still studying, she started to write songs playing a Venezuelan cuatro from her father after not being able to connect with the piano while composing. She still uses the cuatro as one of the main instruments in her music.

== Career ==
While attending a jazz seminar where she performed some of her compositions, she met American musician Charlie Hunter who proposed she work with him. They recorded the album Lo Sagrado at Estrada's parents' cabin in Coatepec; the album was released in 2017 and later re-released in 2020. In 2018, Estrada worked on a second album with Hunter titled Charlie Hunter/Carter McLean Featuring Silvana Estrada. The album was recorded in the United States and also features American drummer Carter McLean. Also in 2018, Estrada released the four-song EP Primeras Canciones. During 2019, she embarked on a Mexican tour and performed with artists like Natalia Lafourcade, Mon Laferte, and Julieta Venegas.

In 2020, she was signed to American label Glassnote Records, becoming the first Latin American artist signed to the label. On January 21, 2022, she released Marchita, her first solo album and third album overall. The album was produced by Gustavo Guerrero and received critical acclaim upon release. To promote the album, she embarked on a solo tour through the United States.

Estrada shared the 2022 Latin Grammy Award for Best New Artist with Angela Alvarez at the 23rd Annual Latin Grammy Awards.

== Influences ==
Estrada has cited American jazz singers Billie Holiday and Sarah Vaughan as influences when she started becoming interested in music. Furthermore, her vocal delivery and style have been influenced by Latin American folk singers like Chavela Vargas, Violeta Parra, Mercedes Sosa and Toña la Negra.

== Discography ==
=== Studio albums ===
- Marchita (2022)
- Vendrán Suaves Lluvias (2025)

=== EPs ===
- Primeras Canciones (2018)
- Abrazo (2022)

=== Collaborative albums ===
- Lo Sagrado with Charlie Hunter (2017)

=== Singles ===
Year	Song	Album
2018	"Te Guardo"	Primeras Canciones
2018	"Sabré Olvidar"	Primeras Canciones
2018	"Tenías Que Ser Tú"	Primeras Canciones
2018	"Amor Eterno"	Primeras Canciones
2019	"Carta"	Marchita
2020	"Para Siempre"	—N/a
2021	"Si Me Matan"	Abrazo
2021	"Marchita"	Marchita
2021	"Tristeza"	Marchita
2021	"La Corriente"	Marchita
2022	"Brindo"	Abrazo
2022	"Aquí"	Abrazo
2023	"Tom's Diner"	—N/a
2023	"Milagro y Desastre"	—N/a
2023	"Qué Problema"	—N/a
2025	"Como Un Pájaro"	Vendrán Suaves Lluvias
2025	"Lila Alelí"	Vendrán Suaves Lluvias
2025	"Dime"	Vendrán Suaves Lluvias
2025	"No Te Vayas Sin Saber"	Vendrán Suaves Lluvias

== Awards and nominations ==
Award	Year	Category	Nominated work	Result	Ref.
Grammy Awards	2024	Best Global Music Performance	"Milagro y Desastre"	Nominated	
Latin Grammy Awards	2022	Best New Artist	Herself	Won	
Latin Grammy Awards	2022	Best Singer-Songwriter Album	Marchita	Nominated	
Latin Grammy Awards	2023	Best Singer-Songwriter Song	"Si Me Matan"	Nominated	
Latin Grammy Awards	2025	Best Singer-Songwriter Song	"Como un Pájaro"	Nominated	
Latin Grammy Awards	2026	Best Singer-Songwriter Song	"Dime"	Won	
Latin Grammy Awards	2026	Record of the Year	"Dime"	Nominated	
Latin Grammy Awards	2026	Song of the Year	"Dime"	Nominated	
Latin Grammy Awards	2026	Album of the Year	Vendrán Suaves Lluvias	Nominated	
Latin Grammy Awards	2026	Best Singer-Songwriter Album	Vendrán Suaves Lluvias	Nominated	
Latin Grammy Awards	2026	Best Roots Song	"El Alma Mía"	Nominated	
Libera Awards	2023	Best Latin Record	Marchita	Nominated	
Rolling Stone en Español Awards	2023	Album of the Year	Marchita	Nominated	
Rolling Stone en Español Awards	2023	Promising Artist of the Year	Herself	Nominated	
Rolling Stone en Español Awards	2023	Voice of the Audience	Herself	Nominated	
