= Elsa y Elmar =

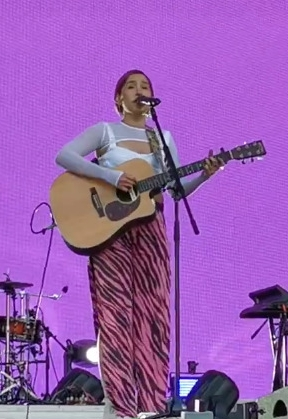

Background information
- Born: Elsa Margarita Carvajal; Bucaramanga, Colombia
- Years active: 2012–present
- Label: Elmar Presenta
- Website: www.elsayelmar.com

Elsa y Elmar is the name of the musical project of Elsa Carvajal, a singer-songwriter from Colombia. The music of Elsa y Elmar can be described as synth-pop, and it integrates elements of folk, tropical, and Latin music. In 2014 Carvajal won the Grand Prize in the Latin category of the John Lennon Songwriting Contest for her song "Me Viene Bien", and in 2016 she played in front of 40,000 people as the opening act for Coldplay at their concert at the Estadio El Campín in Bogotá. Since 2018 she has lived in Mexico.

== History ==
Born in Bucaramanga, Colombia, Carvajal took some classes in musical appreciation and flute at the age of nine, but admitted that she had little discipline to continue with them. At the age of 16, she enrolled in a jazz academy, and then in 2011, she traveled to Boston, Massachusetts in order to study at the Berklee College of Music. Carvajal came up with the concept of Elsa y Elmar in 2012 during her time in Boston. In an interview with Colombia's W Radio, Carvajal explained that she liked the idea of being accompanied rather than being a solo star, and that the people who surrounded her and supported her music were her "sea" – the name "Elmar" is a play on "el mar", meaning "the sea" in Spanish. In 2013 she recorded a six-track EP titled Sentirnos Bien, produced by San Francisco-born Colombian Mateo Lewis, himself a former student of Berklee. The EP was released in digital format on October 13, 2013. One of the tracks from Sentirnos Bien, "Me Viene Bien", was entered into the second session of the 2014 John Lennon Songwriting Contest for new songwriters and won the Grand Prize in the Latin category.

On completing her studies at Berklee, Carvajal moved to San Francisco, where she assembled a band to accompany her live performances. Elsa y Elmar's first full-length album, Rey, was released on September 25, 2015. It was preceded by a single, "Exploradora", which was accompanied by a video shot in various parks and beaches around San Francisco. Carvajal described Rey as "spiritual pop".

In 2015, Elsa y Elmar performed at a number of music festivals, including Estéreo Picnic Festival in Bogotá, Colombia and Festival Coordenada in Guadalajara, Mexico. On April 13, 2016, Elsa y Elmar performed as the opening act for British band Coldplay's concert at the Estadio El Campín in Bogotá.

2019 brought the release of Elsa y Elmar's second full-length album: Eres Diamante, and a nomination for Best New Artist at the Latin Grammy Awards.

On April 28, 2022 Elsa y Elmar released another LP: ya no somos los mismos. According to Carvajal the album is about a difficult breakup and the process of closing that chapter of her life, healing, and looking for new meaning. The experience left her so shaken that she didn't know if she would continue making music. The album was recorded in Hermosillo, Mexico and is accompanied by a short film (directed by Jorge Leyva) that combines twelve of the album's songs.

== Discography ==
- Sentirnos Bien (2013)
- Rey (2015)
- Eres Diamante (2019)
- Cuatro Veces 10 (2020)
- ya no somos los mismos (2022)
- Palacio (2024)

== Awards and nominations ==
Award	Year	Category	Nominated work	Result	Ref.
Berlin Music Video Awards	2025	Best Animation	"Entre las piernas"	Nominated	
Latin Grammy Awards	2019	Best New Artist	Elsa y Elmar	Nominated	
Latin Grammy Awards	2020	Best Pop Song	"Una Vez Más" (as songwriter)	Nominated	
Latin Grammy Awards	2022	Album of the Year	ya no somos los mismos	Nominated	
Latin Grammy Awards	2022	Best Pop Vocal Album	ya no somos los mismos	Nominated	
Latin Grammy Awards	2022	Best Pop/Rock Song	"qué voy a hacer conmigo??"	Nominated	
Latin Grammy Awards	2025	Best Contemporary Pop Album	Palacio	Pending	
Premios Gardel	2024	Best Pop Song	"Pelo Suelto" (with Conociendo Rusia)	Nominated	
Premio Lo Nuestro	2023	New Artist – Female	Elsa y Elmar	Nominated	
Premios Nuestra Tierra	2020	Best Alternative/Rock Song	"Ojos Noche"	Nominated	
Premios Nuestra Tierra	2023	Best Alternative/Rock/Indie Artist	Elsa y Elmar	Nominated	
Premios Nuestra Tierra	2024	Best Rock/Alternative/Indie Song	"Peso Suelto" (with Conocienci Rusia)	Nominated	
UK Music Video Awards	2021	Best Pop Video - Newcomer	"Corazones Negros"	Nominated	
UK Music Video Awards	2024	Best Animation in a Video	"entre las piernes"	Nominated	

Note: At the 23rd Annual Latin Grammy Awards, ya no somos los mismos was also nominated for Best Engineered Album, the nomination is given to Julián Bernal, Nico Cotton, Carlitos González, Alberto Hernández, Michel Kuri, Malay, Felipe Mejía, Jv Olivier, Juan Sebastián Parra, Alejandro García Partida, Alan Saucedo, Raúl López, Lewis Pickett, Harold Sanders & Dave Kutch, the engineers and mixers of the album.
