= X-Alfonso =

Cuban hip hop and afro-rock musician (born c. 1974)

X Alfonso
- X Alfonso.

Background information
- Origin: Havana, Cuba
- Genres: Fusión; Hip hop Son Cubano; Afro-rock
- Years active: 1990–present

X-Alfonso (born c. 1974 as Equis Alfonso) is a Cuban hip hop and afro-rock musician, who played with Audioslave in a concert in Havana on May 7, 2005, in "Tribuna Anti-imperialista".

== Life and career ==
X Alfonso has been playing music since he was seven years old, “ When I was around 16 or 17, I started playing jazz and fusion music, working with troubadours and putting together my own arrangements and recordings.” X Alfonso started his career with a group called Estado de Animo while he was still at the music school. From early 1990s, when he graduated, he joined the Cuban group Síntesis led by his parents Carlos Alfonso and Ele Valdès, as singer and composer or co-composer. “I arrived just as the group’s keyboard player was leaving, so I started off playing keyboards. Then I found myself on percussion and vocals. That’s how I learned to play the instruments, through necessity.” The group started as a vocal quartet, then turned to symphonic rock before going on to explore a fusion between Afro-Cuban music—Cuban roots—and contemporary music. X Alfonso explains: “my music has always revolved around roots and exploration. That’s what I’m always trying to convey; I draw on folklore, on Cuba.” X Alfonso made six records with “Síntesis” and has released four records of his own and is now working on releasing his fifth. X Alfonso started his solo career in 1998. His first record “Mundo Real” in 2000 is a mix of jazz and fusion. The second “X moré” is more hip-hop, based on a blend of Big Band hits from the forties and the fifties. The third “Delirium Tremens” is more progressive, combining African drums, symphonic orchestra and flamenco. The fourth, “Civilización”, pulls together material from the first three records, and the fifth is a new record: “I’m currently working on “Revoluxion” (with an X). “Revoluxion” reflects a different style and another aspect of Cuban folklore, rumba, drawing on Afro-Cuban culture through a mix of rumba and funk, which is what I'm into now.” He is cousins with comedian Joey Diaz.

As a video clip maker, he is one of the most awarded artists at the Lucas Awards in Cuba. In 2008-2009 he directed the documentary Sin título, about the daily universe of Cuban artists and conceived the Cuban Art Factory (FAC, in Spanish), which as of 2010 becomes a brand new space with transmedia vocation and where emerging young artists (musicians, filmmakers, painters, dancers) converge with others with a longer career. Since 2015, and with X Alfonso in front, FAC has become one of the most important cultural projects in the country, with an artistic proposal, an environment and an audience that have made it worthy of being considered one of the one hundred best places in the world, according to TIME magazine.

In 2010 he received the title of Goodwill Ambassador of UNICEF for his artistic work with and for children.

His 2022 album, Ancestros Sinfónico, was listed in NPR's staff picks for the best albums of the year.

== Musical Influence ==
X Alfonso finds that today’s new Cuban generation is made of fusion, like his music, “Cubans today are a mix of Spanish, African, English, French, Chinese... A melting pot that has a lot to offer to the pages of history.” And it's this culture that X Alfonso tries to show in his music. “The people who come to see me are rappers, rockers, salseros, young, old.... I have a really broad audience because of the range of music I cover. I try to reflect all of this as a musician, drawing on different rhythms, melodies and harmonies. I’m always amazed to find myself exploring one area then something completely different—total opposites—and when I mix the two together it seems totally normal.”

What interests X Alfonso about Cuba is the people, the people in the streets and the generations of young artists putting their art out there. “I’m basically working with street talent, and I try to show that Havana and Cuba have a whole lot to offer, like every country. It goes far beyond a simple performance.”

== Discography ==
- Mundo Real (2000)
- X Moré (2001)
- Civilización (2005)
- Revoluxion (2007)
- Reverse (2011)
- INSIDE (2020)
- Ancestros Sinfónico (2022)
