= 1st Annual Premios Odeón =

1st Premios Odeón
- Date: January 20, 2020; 10:00 p.m.– 12:45 a.m. CET
- Venue: Teatro Real, Madrid, Spain
- Hosted by: Quequé

Highlights
- Album of the Year: #ElDisco by Alejandro Sanz
- Best Male Artist: Beret
- Best Female Artist: Vanesa Martín
- Best New Artist: Aitana

Television/radio coverage
- Network: Televisión Española

The 1st Annual Premios Odeón was held on January 20, 2020 at the Teatro Real in Madrid. It was broadcast on Televisión Española at 10 p.m. CET. Nominations were revealed on December 19, 2019 during a press conference where they stated that "this award ceremony is considered the successor of the Premios Amigo and the Premios de la Música" which were canceled in 2007 and 2012 due to the Spanish economical crisis as well as the lack of strength of the Spanish musical industry. Thus, the fact that this award show was able to happen symbolizes the revival of the Spanish musical industry after a long period of weakness and irrelevance.

== Background ==
In December 2019 the Premios Odeón were announced in a press conference as the equivalent to the Grammy Awards in Spain. The award ceremony was organized by the Asociación de Gestión de Derechos Intelectuales (AGEDI). Nominations were announced on December 19 with Spanish singer-songwriter Rosalía leading with seven. On January 17 it was announced that La 1 would broadcast the ceremony. The person responsible for the scenography was Suso33. Spanish humorist Quequé hosted the gala.

== Controversy ==
The ceremony was well organised even though many technical difficulties happened during its broadcast during presentations, monologues and musical performances. This pushed Radio Televisión Española to emit a communicate where they asked for explanations to the organizers of the Premios Odeón for technical errors: "The desire of the RTVE management team to promote and support music motivated the commitment to broadcast the Premios Odeón gala on January 20, on La 1, live and in the time slot maximum audience. Unfortunately, the result of this gala, held and produced by AGEDI, was very far from the quality standards that RTVE demands in its programs. RTVE Management regrets the inconvenience that these technical problems and mismatches produced in the audience and has requested explanations from the event organizers".

The Premios Odeón were also criticized for being "elitist" and in favor of the main multi-million dollar record labels. Most professionals highlighted the marginalization of independent artist or simply artists that do not belong to Universal or Sony Music. Awards like Best Live are not given to the artist with the best vocal ability but to the one who had sold more tickets over the past year.

== Performers ==
Artist(s)	Song(s)
Alejandro Sanz	"El Trato" (with Pol Granch) "No Tengo Nada" (with Pablo López) "Mi Persona Favorita" (with Laura Pausini)
Manuel Carrasco; Mon Laferte	"Dispara Lentamente"
Aitana; Antonio José	"Vas a quedarte"
Danny Ocean	"Swing" (with Alba Reche) "Me Rehúso"
Álex Ubago; Andrés Suárez; Natalia Lacunza; David Rees; Shuarma; Georgina	Tribute to José Luis Perales "¿Y Cómo Es Él?" "¿Por Qué te Vas?" "Te Quiero"
Beret; Sebastián Yatra	"Vuelve"
Vanesa Martín; Carlos Rivera	"De tus ojos"
José Mercé; Tomatito; Pablo Alborán	"Tu Frialdad"
Estopa; India Martínez	"Fuego"
Lola Índigo; Don Patricio	"Lola Bunny" "Contando Lunares"

== Nominees and winners ==
The following is the list of nominees.

Song of the Year - presented by Andrés Ceballo and Nathy Peluso

Don Patricio featuring Cruz Cafuné — "Contando Lunares"

- Rosalía, J Balvin and El Guincho — "Con Altura"
- Don Patricio — "Enchochado de Ti"
- La Nueva Escuela and Omar Montes — "La Rubia (Remix)"
- Rosalía — "Malamente"
- Beret — "Lo Siento"
- Lola Indigo and Mala Rodríguez — "Mujer Bruja"
- Rosalia — "Milionària"
- Morat and Aitana — "Presiento"
- Rosalía featuring Ozuna — "Yo X Ti, Tu X Mi"

Album of the Year - presented by Laura Pausini and Pablo López

Alejandro Sanz — #ElDisco

- Aitana — Spoiler
- Marea — El Azogue
- El Barrio — El Danzar de las Mariposas
- Rosalía — El Mal Querer
- Manuel Carrasco — La Cruz del Mapa
- Leiva — Nuclear
- Natalia Lacunza — Otras Alas
- Camela — Rebobinando
- Vanesa Martín — Todas las Mujeres Que Habitan en Mí

Best Music Video — presented by Amaral

Rosalía, J Balvin and El Guincho — "Con Altura" (by Director X)

- C. Tangana and Becky G — "Booty" (by Pablo Larcuen)
- Don Patricio and Cruz Cafuné — "Contando Lunares" (by Golden Beetle Films)
- Rosalía — "Malamente" (by CANADA)
- Alejandro Sanz and Camila Cabello — "Mi Persona Favorita" (by Gil Green)
- David Bisbal and Greeicy — "Perdón" (by Starlite)
- Morat and Aitana — "Presiento" (by Lyona)
- Aitana — "Teléfono" (by Mauri D. Galiano)
- Lola Indigo — "Ya No Quiero Ná" (by Bruno Valverde)
- Rosalía and Ozuna — "Yo X Ti, Tu X Mi" (by RJ Sanchez and Pasqual Gutierrez)

Best New Artist — presented by Álvaro Soler and Mala Rodríguez

Aitana

- Adexe & Nau
- Alba Reche
- Alfred García
- Ana Guerra
- Beret
- Cepeda
- Don Patricio
- Lola Indigo
- Natalia Lacunza

Best Male Artist — presented by Alaska and Camela

Beret

- Alejandro Sanz
- Antonio José
- C. Tangana
- Don Patricio
- El Barrio
- Joaquín Sabina
- Leiva
- Manuel Carrasco
- Sergio Dalma

Best Female Artist — presented by Macaco and Niña Pastori

Vanesa Martín

- Aitana
- Alba Reche
- Amaia
- Ana Guerra
- Lola Indigo
- Mónica Naranjo
- Natalia Lacunza
- Rosalía
- Rozalén

Best Group — presented by Mikel Erentxun and Ariel Rot

Estopa

- Adexe & Nau
- Amaral
- Camela
- DVICIO
- Fangoria
- IZAL
- Mägo de Oz
- Marea
- Oques Grasses

Best Latin Artist — presented by Ana Guerra and Carlos Baute

Morat

- Anuel AA
- Bad Bunny
- Daddy Yankee
- Danny Ocean
- J Balvin
- Lunay
- Maluma
- Ozuna
- Paulo Londra

Flamenco Album of the Year - presented by Paco León and Tomasito

José Mercé and Tomatito — De Verdad

Best Live - presented by Álvaro Urquillo and Tini

Manuel Carrasco — La Cruz del Mapa Tour

Honorific Award - presented by Antonio Guisasola and Edurne

José Luis Perales

== Multiple Nominations and Awards ==
The following received multiple nominations.

Eight nominations

- Rosalía

Six nominations

- Aitana

Five nominations

- Don Patricio

Four nominations

- Lola Indigo

Three nominations

- Beret
- Manuel Carrasco
- Natalia Lacunza
- Ozuna
- J Balvin

Two nominations

- Adexe & Nau
- Alba Reche
- Alejandro Sanz
- Ana Guerra
- Camela
- C. Tangana
- Cruz Cafuné
- El Barrio
- Leiva
- Marea
- Morat
- Vanesa Martín
