= LOS40 Music Awards 2021 =

Spanish music awards ceremony

- Date: November 12, 2021
- Location: Velòdrom Illes Balears, Palma de Mallorca
- Presented by: Los 40

Highlights
- Most wins: Ed Sheeran (4)
- Most nominations: C. Tangana and Ed Sheeran (4 each)
- Website: los40.com/tag/los40_music_awards/a/

The sixteenth edition of LOS40 Music Awards was held at the Velòdrom Illes Balears in Palma de Mallorca, on November 12, 2021. Ed Sheeran was the most-awarded artist at the ceremony, winning a total of four awards for Best Artist, Best Song and Video (for "Bad Habits"), and Best Live Act.

== Performers ==
List of musical performances at the LOS40 Music Awards 2021
Artist(s)	Song(s)
Hombres G	"Voy a pasármelo bien"
Dani Martín	"No, no vuelve" "Son sueños"
Lola Índigo	"Santería" "La Niña de la Escuela"
Leiva; Ximena Sariñana	"Histéricos" (Filmed at Lithica, Ciutadella de Menorca)
Ed Sheeran	"Bad Habits" "Shivers"
Griff	"One Night"
Pablo Alborán; Aitana; Álvaro de Luna	"Llueve sobre mojado"
Justin Quiles	"Loco"
Nicki Nicole	"Colocao"
Sebastián Yatra	"Tacones rojos" "Pareja del Año" "Chica Ideal"
Marc Seguí	"Tiroteo (Remix)"
Ana Mena; Rocco Hunt	"Un beso de improviso" "A un paso de la luna"
Melendi	"La boca junta" (Filmed at an undisclosed location in Mallorca)
Aitana	"Berlín" "Mon Amour (Remix)" (with Zzoilo)
Beret	"Desde cero"
Álvaro Soler	"Magia"
Topic; A7S	"Breaking Me" "Your Love (9PM)"

On October 24, 2021, Ed Sheeran announced that he had tested positive for COVID-19 and would be fulfilling all subsequent commitments remotely. The singer completed his quarantine by November 2 and was cleared to resume in-person promotional activities for =, including his appearance at Los40.

== Winners and nominees ==
Nominees were revealed on October 5, 2021, at an announcement dinner held in Ibiza. C. Tangana and Ed Sheeran were the most-nominated artists overall, as well as in the national and international sections respectively, with four nominations each. Rauw Alejandro and Sebastián Yatra led the Latin nominees with three nominations apiece. Sheeran won all four of his nominations and was the most-nominated artist of the night, while C.Tangana won two of his four. Winners are listed first and highlighted in bold.

List of winners and nominees for the LOS40 Music Awards 2021
**Spain**
Best Act	Best New Act
**C. Tangana**; Ana Mena; Pablo Alborán; Vanesa Martín; Lola Índigo	**Álvaro de Luna**; Marc Seguí; Marlena; Pole; Belén Aguilera
Best Album	Best Song
**Pablo Alborán – Vértigo**; Sidecars – Ruido de fondo; Dani Martín – Lo que me dé la gana; Aitana – 11 Razones; C. Tangana – El Madrileño	**Dani Martín – "Portales"**; C. Tangana, La Húngara & Niño de Elche – "Tú Me Dejaste De Querer"; Álvaro de Luna – "Juramento eterno de sal"; Pablo Alborán – "Si hubieras querido"; Ana Mena & Rocco Hunt – "A un paso de la luna"
Best Video	Best Live Act
**Lola Índigo, Tini and Belinda – "La niña de la escuela"**; Pol Granch – "No pegamos"; Sweet California – "Whisper"; Álvaro Soler – "Magia"; C. Tangana, Gipsy Kings, Nicolás Reyes & Tonino Baliardo – "Ingobernable"	**Aitana**; Marlon; Bombai; Dani Fernández; Sidecars
Del 40 Al 1 Artist Award
**Ana Mena**; Beret; Dvicio; Nil Moliner; Omar Montes
**International**
Best Act	Best New Act
**Ed Sheeran**; Imagine Dragons; BTS; The Weeknd; Doja Cat	**Griff**; The Kid Laroi; Olivia Rodrigo; 24kGoldn; Måneskin
Best Album	Best Song
**Olivia Rodrigo – Sour**; Justin Bieber – Justice; Sam Smith – Love Goes; The Kid Laroi – F*ck Love 3+: Over You; Ariana Grande – Positions	**Ed Sheeran – "Bad Habits"**; BTS – "Dynamite"; Olivia Rodrigo – "Drivers License"; The Kid Laroi – "Without You"; Lil Nas X – "Montero (Call Me by Your Name)"
Best Video	Best Live Act
**Ed Sheeran – "Bad Habits"**; Lil Nas X – "Montero (Call Me by Your Name)"; Dua Lipa – "We're Good"; Coldplay – "Higher Power"; Camila Cabello – "Don't Go Yet"	**Ed Sheeran**; Shawn Mendes; Imagine Dragons; Justin Bieber; Dua Lipa
Best Dance Act
**Topic**; Majestic; Riton x Nightcrawlers; Purple Disco Machine; David Guetta
**Latin**
Best Act	Best New Act
**Sebastián Yatra**; Camilo; Tini; Danna Paola; Becky G	**Nicki Nicole**; Nathy Peluso; Mariah Angeliq; María Becerra; Nio García
Best Urban Act	Best Song
**Rauw Alejandro**; J Balvin; Justin Quiles; Jhay Cortez; Karol G	**Rauw Alejandro – "Todo de Ti"**; Bad Bunny and Jhay Cortez – "Dakiti"; Sebastián Yatra and Myke Towers – "Pareja del Año"; Camilo – "Vida de rico"; Farruko – "Pepas"
Best Video
**Sebastián Yatra and Myke Towers – "Pareja del Año"**; Karol G, Anuel AA and J Balvin – "Location"; Bad Bunny and Rosalía – "La Noche de Anoche"; Rauw Alejandro – "Todo de Ti"; J Balvin and Skrillex – "In da Getto"
**Golden Music Award**
**Hombres G** **Rafael Nadal**
