= List of number-one singles of 2020 (Spain) =

This lists the singles that reached number one on the Spanish PROMUSICAE sales and airplay charts in 2020. Total sales correspond to the data sent by regular contributors to sales volumes and by digital distributors.

== Chart history ==
Week	Issue date	Top Streaming, Downloads & Physical Sales			Most Airplay		
Week	Issue date	Artist(s)	Song	Ref.	Artist(s)	Song	Ref.
1	January 2	Karol G and Nicki Minaj	"Tusa"		Maroon 5	"Memories"	
2	January 9	Karol G and Nicki Minaj	"Tusa"		Beret	"Si por mí fuera"	
3	January 16	Karol G and Nicki Minaj	"Tusa"		Maroon 5	"Memories"	
4	January 23	Karol G and Nicki Minaj	"Tusa"		Maroon 5	"Memories"	
5	January 30	Karol G and Nicki Minaj	"Tusa"		Pablo Alborán and Ava Max	"Tabú"	
6	February 6	Karol G and Nicki Minaj	"Tusa"		Pablo Alborán and Ava Max	"Tabú"	
7	February 13	Karol G and Nicki Minaj	"Tusa"		Pablo Alborán and Ava Max	"Tabú"	
8	February 20	Karol G and Nicki Minaj	"Tusa"		Maroon 5	"Memories"	
9	February 27	Karol G and Nicki Minaj	"Tusa"		Maroon 5	"Memories"	
10	March 5	Karol G and Nicki Minaj	"Tusa"		David Otero and Taburete	"Una foto en blanco y negro"	
11	March 12	Karol G and Nicki Minaj	"Tusa"		David Otero and Taburete	"Una foto en blanco y negro"	
12	March 19	Karol G and Nicki Minaj	"Tusa"		David Otero and Taburete	"Una foto en blanco y negro"	
13	March 26	J Balvin	"Amarillo"		David Otero and Taburete	"Una foto en blanco y negro"	
14	April 2	Bad Bunny featuring Jowell & Randy and Ñengo Flow	"Safaera"		Nil Moliner featuring Dani Fernández	"Soldadito de hierro"	
15	April 9	Bad Bunny featuring Jowell & Randy and Ñengo Flow	"Safaera"		Karol G and Nicki Minaj	"Tusa"	
16	April 16	Bad Bunny featuring Jowell & Randy and Ñengo Flow	"Safaera"		Karol G and Nicki Minaj	"Tusa"	
17	April 23	Bad Bunny featuring Jowell & Randy and Ñengo Flow	"Safaera"		Karol G and Nicki Minaj	"Tusa"	
18	April 30	C. Tangana	"Nunca Estoy"		Tones and I	"Dance Monkey"	
19	May 7	C. Tangana	"Nunca Estoy"		Nil Moliner featuring Dani Fernández	"Soldadito de hierro"	
20	May 14	Bad Bunny and Don Omar	"Pa' Romperla"		Nea	"Some Say"	
21	May 21	Bad Bunny and Don Omar	"Pa' Romperla"		The Weeknd	"Blinding Lights"	
22	May 28	Justin Quiles, Daddy Yankee and El Alfa	"Pam"		The Weeknd	"Blinding Lights"	
23	June 4	Rosalía and Travis Scott	"TKN"		Nea	"Some Say"	
24	June 11	Anuel AA and Bad Bunny	"Hasta Que Dios Diga"		The Weeknd	"Blinding Lights"	
25	June 18	Nio Garcia, Anuel AA, Myke Towers, Juanka and Brray	"La Jeepeta (Remix)"		The Weeknd	"Blinding Lights"	
26	June 25	Anuel AA	"El manual"		The Weeknd	"Blinding Lights"	
27	July 2	Ozuna	"Caramelo"		The Weeknd	"Blinding Lights"	
28	July 9	Ozuna	"Caramelo"		The Weeknd	"Blinding Lights"	
29	July 16	Ozuna	"Caramelo"		David Bisbal and Aitana	"Si tú la quieres"	
30	July 23	Ozuna	"Caramelo"		David Bisbal and Aitana	"Si tú la quieres"	
31	July 30	Tainy and J Balvin	"Agua"		Beret and Pablo Alborán	"Sueño"	
32	August 6	Trueno, Nicki Nicole, Bizarrap, Taiu and Tatool	"Mamichula"		Beret and Pablo Alborán	"Sueño"	
33	August 13	Trueno, Nicki Nicole, Bizarrap, Taiu and Tatool	"Mamichula"		Beret and Pablo Alborán	"Sueño"	
34	August 20	Trueno, Nicki Nicole, Bizarrap, Taiu and Tatool	"Mamichula"		Beret and Pablo Alborán	"Sueño"	
35	August 27	Maluma	"Hawái"		The Weeknd	"Blinding Lights"	
36	September 3	Maluma	"Hawái"		Ava Max	"Kings & Queens"	
37	September 10	Maluma	"Hawái"		Beret and Pablo Alborán	"Sueño"	
38	September 17	Maluma	"Hawái"		The Weeknd	"Blinding Lights"	
39	September 24	Maluma	"Hawái"		The Weeknd	"Blinding Lights"	
40	October 1	Maluma	"Hawái"		Ava Max	"Kings & Queens"	
41	October 8	Maluma	"Hawái"		Ava Max	"Kings & Queens"	
42	October 15	Maluma	"Hawái"		Ava Max	"Kings & Queens"	
43	October 22	C. Tangana	"Demasiadas mujeres"		Dani Martín featuring Juanes	"Los huesos"	
44	October 29	Manuel Turizo, Rauw Alejandro and Myke Towers	"La Nota"		Sidecars	"Mundo imperfecto"	
45	November 5	Bad Bunny and Jhay Cortez	"Dakiti"		Ava Max	"Kings & Queens"	
46	November 12	C. Tangana featuring Niño de Elche and La Húngara	"Tú Me Dejaste De Querer"		David Guetta and Sia	"Let's Love"	
47	November 19	C. Tangana featuring Niño de Elche and La Húngara	"Tú Me Dejaste De Querer"		Nil Moliner	"Mi Religión"	
48	November 26	Bad Bunny and Jhay Cortez	"Dakiti"		Ava Max	"Kings & Queens"	
49	December 2	Bad Bunny featuring Rosalía	"La Noche de Anoche"		Sidecars	"Mundo Imperfecto"	
50	December 9	Bad Bunny and Jhay Cortez	"Dakiti"		Ava Max	"Kings & Queens"	
51	December 16	Bad Bunny and Jhay Cortez	"Dakiti"		BTS	"Dynamite"	
52	December 23	Bad Bunny and Jhay Cortez	"Dakiti"		BTS	"Dynamite"	
53	December 30	Bad Bunny and Jhay Cortez	"Dakiti"		BTS	"Dynamite"	
