= Bien (EP) =

EP by C. Tangana
- Released: May 14, 2020
- Genres: Hip hop; pop rap
- Length: 11:52
- Language: Spanish
- Label: Sony Spain
- Producers: Alizzz; C. Tangana; Nineteen85; Pional & Rusowsky; The Groove Sound; Jambo; Fallwood; Chico Blanco

C. Tangana chronology
Avida Dollars (2018)	Bien (2020)	El Madrileño (2021)

Singles from Bien
- 1. "Nunca Estoy" Released: April 24, 2020; 2. "Guille Asesino" Released: May 7, 2020

Bien (stylized as Bien:() is the first extended play by Spanish singer-songwriter and rapper C. Tangana. Written by Tangana and co-produced with Alizzz and some other usual collaborators, the EP was released on May 14, 2020 through Sony Music. Mainly composed during the COVID-19 pandemic national lockdown in Spain, the extended play shows Tangana's evolution to a more emo and melodic rap field. It spawned two singles prior to its release, "Nunca Estoy" and "Guille Asesino". The project was re-released for its vinyl edition on October 21 and included a new track "Ojalá" alongside Chico Blanco.

== Track listing ==
No.	Title	Writer(s)	Producer(s)	Length
1.	"Bien"	Cristian Quirante Catalán; Antón Álvarez Alfaro; Rusowsky	Alizzz; Rusowsky	1:52
2.	"Nunca Estoy"	Quirante * Álvarez *Alejandro Sanz *Paul Jefferies *Rosario González Flores	C. Tangana; Alizzz; Nineteen85	2:42
3.	"Guille Asesino"	Quirante; Álvarez; Miguel Barros	C. Tangana; Alizzz; Pional	2:35
4.	"Adelante_ruffdemo2016"	Quirante; Álvarez	Alizzz	1:44
5.	"Ojalá" (with Chico Blanco)	Álvarez; Quirante; Jacco Troost; Pablo Cobo; Raúl Bermejo	Chico Blanco; Jambo; Fallwood; Alizzz; Alex Ferrer	3:01
Total length:				11:52

== Release history ==
Country	Date	Format	Label	Ref.
Various	May 14, 2020	Digital download; streaming	Sony Spain	
Spain	October 21, 2020	Vinyl	Sony Spain	
