= Antes de morirme =

Song by Spanish artist C. Tangana and Rosalía

Single by C. Tangana featuring Rosalía
- Language: Spanish
- English title: "Before I Die"
- Released: June 30, 2016
- Genre: Dancehall
- Length: 3:20
- Label: Sony Spain
- Songwriter(s): Antón Álvarez; Rosalía Vila; Cristian Quirante
- Producer(s): Alizzz

C. Tangana singles chronology
"Los Chikos de Madriz" (2016)	"Antes de morirme" (2016)	"Persiguiéndonos" (2016)

Rosalía singles chronology
"Antes de Morirme" (2016)	"Catalina" (2016)

Music video
- "Antes de Morirme" on YouTube

"Antes de morirme" (Spanish for "Before I Die") is a song recorded by Spanish rapper C. Tangana featuring Spanish flamenco singer Rosalía. It was written by the performers and produced by Alizzz. The song was released on June 30, 2016 through Sony Music Spain. It is a sleeper hit since it became surprisingly popular in the summer of 2018 after Rosalía began to receive international attention and after it was included in the soundtrack of the first season of the Spanish Netflix show Élite (2018). The song peaked at 26 on the Spanish Music Charts (PROMUSICAE).

== Charts ==
Weekly chart performance for "Antes de morirme"
Chart (2018)	Peak position
Spain (PROMUSICAE)	26

=== Year-end charts ===
2018 year-end chart performance for "Antes de morirme"
Chart (2018)	Position
Spain (PROMUSICAE)	97

2019 year-end chart performance for "Antes de morirme"
Chart (2019)	Position
Spain (PROMUSICAE)	90

== Release history ==
Country	Date	Format	Label
Various	30 June 2016	Digital download; streaming	Sony Spain
