= This Excessive Ambition =

- Theatrical release poster
- Spanish: Esta ambición desmedida
- Directed by: Santos Bacana; Cristina Trenas; Rogelio González
- Starring: C. Tangana
- Production company: Little Spain
- Distributed by: Avalon
- Release dates: 28 September 2023 (Zinemaldia); 26 October 2023 (Spain)
- Country: Spain
- Language: Spanish

This Excessive Ambition (Spanish: Esta ambición desmedida) is a 2023 Spanish documentary film directed by Santos Bacana, Cristina Trenas, and Rogelio González. It stars C. Tangana.

== Plot ==
The film explores the creative process behind the El Madrileño album by C. Tangana aka Pucho aka Antón Álvarez Alfaro and the backstage of the Sin cantar ni afinar world tour.

== Production ==
The film is a Little Spain production.

== Release ==
The film had its world premiere in the 'Velodrome' section of the 71st San Sebastián International Film Festival on 28 September 2023. Distributed by Avalon, it was released theatrically in Spain on 26 October 2023. It also screened as the opening film of the 39th Guadalajara International Film Festival on 7 June 2024.

== Reception ==
Àlex Montoya of Fotogramas rated the film 4 out of 5 stars, writing that the "narrative and visual proposal is a triumph".

Luis M. Maínez of Mondo Sonoro gave the film 8 out of 10 points, considering the result to be "a truly entertaining and even endearing human tragicomedy, with humor and worldly tension well-sustained and well-diluted when it is time".

Janire Zurbano of Cinemanía rated the film 3½ out of 5 stars, writing that it "manages to separate itself from other more conventional documentaries on musicians thanks to its honesty".

== Accolades ==
Year	Award	Category	Nominee(s)	Result	Ref.
2024	38th Goya Awards	Best Documentary Film		Nominated	

== See also ==
- List of Spanish films of 2023
