= List of number-one albums of 2017 (Spain) =

Top 100 España is a record chart published weekly by PROMUSICAE (Productores de Música de España), a non-profit organization composed by Spain and multinational record companies. This association tracks record sales (physical and digital) in Spain.

== Albums ==
Week	Chart date	Album	Artist(s)	Ref
1	January 5	Quítate las gafas	Melendi	
2	January 12	Quítate las gafas	Melendi	
3	January 19	Quítate las gafas	Melendi	
4	January 26	Return to Ommadawn	Mike Oldfield	
5	February 2	La La Land: Original Motion Picture Soundtrack	Various artists	
6	February 9	La La Land: Original Motion Picture Soundtrack	Various artists	
7	February 16	Rompiendo fronteras	Alejandro Fernández	
8	February 23	En la espiral	Lori Meyers	
9	March 2	Antonimo	Rayden	
10	March 9	÷	Ed Sheeran	
11	March 16	Lo niego todo	Joaquín Sabina	
12	March 23	Lo niego todo	Joaquín Sabina	
13	March 30	Lo niego todo	Joaquín Sabina	
14	April 6	Lo niego todo	Joaquín Sabina	
15	April 13	Lo niego todo	Joaquín Sabina	
16	April 20	Lo niego todo	Joaquín Sabina	
17	April 27	Lo niego todo	Joaquín Sabina	
18	May 4	Lo niego todo	Joaquín Sabina	
19	May 11	Lo niego todo	Joaquín Sabina	
20	May 18	Harry Styles	Harry Styles	
21	May 25	Chalk Dreams	Carlos Marco	
22	June 1	Desde una ventana	Andrés Suárez	
23	June 8	Me metí en tu corazón	Camela	
24	June 15	Witness	Katy Perry	
25	June 22	Más: 20th Aniversario	Alejandro Sanz	
26	June 29	Lo niego todo	Joaquín Sabina	
27	July 6	Gracias	Gemeliers	
28	July 13	Gracias	Gemeliers	
29	July 20	Gracias	Gemeliers	
30	July 27	Lust for Life	Lana Del Rey	
31	August 3	Gracias	Gemeliers	
32	August 10	Gracias	Gemeliers	
33	August 17	Lo niego todo	Joaquin Sabina	
34	August 24	Gracias	Gemeliers	
35	August 31	Fifth Harmony	Fifth Harmony	
36	September 7	3+Ladies Tour	Sweet California	
37	September 14	Tú y yo	Adexe & Nau	
38	September 21	La calma	Pastora Soler	
39	September 28	Cuando el río sueno...	Rozalén	
40	October 5	Younger Now	Miley Cyrus	
41	October 12	Vía Dalma III	Sergio Dalma	
42	October 19	Vía Dalma III	Sergio Dalma	
43	October 26	Expectativas	Bunbury	
44	November 2	Las costuras del alma	El Barrio	
45	November 9	A un milímetro de ti	Antonio José	
46	November 16	Mismo sitio, distinto lugar	Vetusta Morla	
47	November 23	Prometo	Pablo Alborán	
48	November 30	Prometo	Pablo Alborán	
49	December 7	Prometo	Pablo Alborán	
50	December 14	+ Es + (El Concierto / En Directo en El Estadio Vicente Calderón / 2017)	Alejandro Sanz	
51	December 21	Prometo	Pablo Alborán	
52	December 28	Prometo	Pablo Alborán	
