= C. Tangana =

Spanish rapper (born 1990)

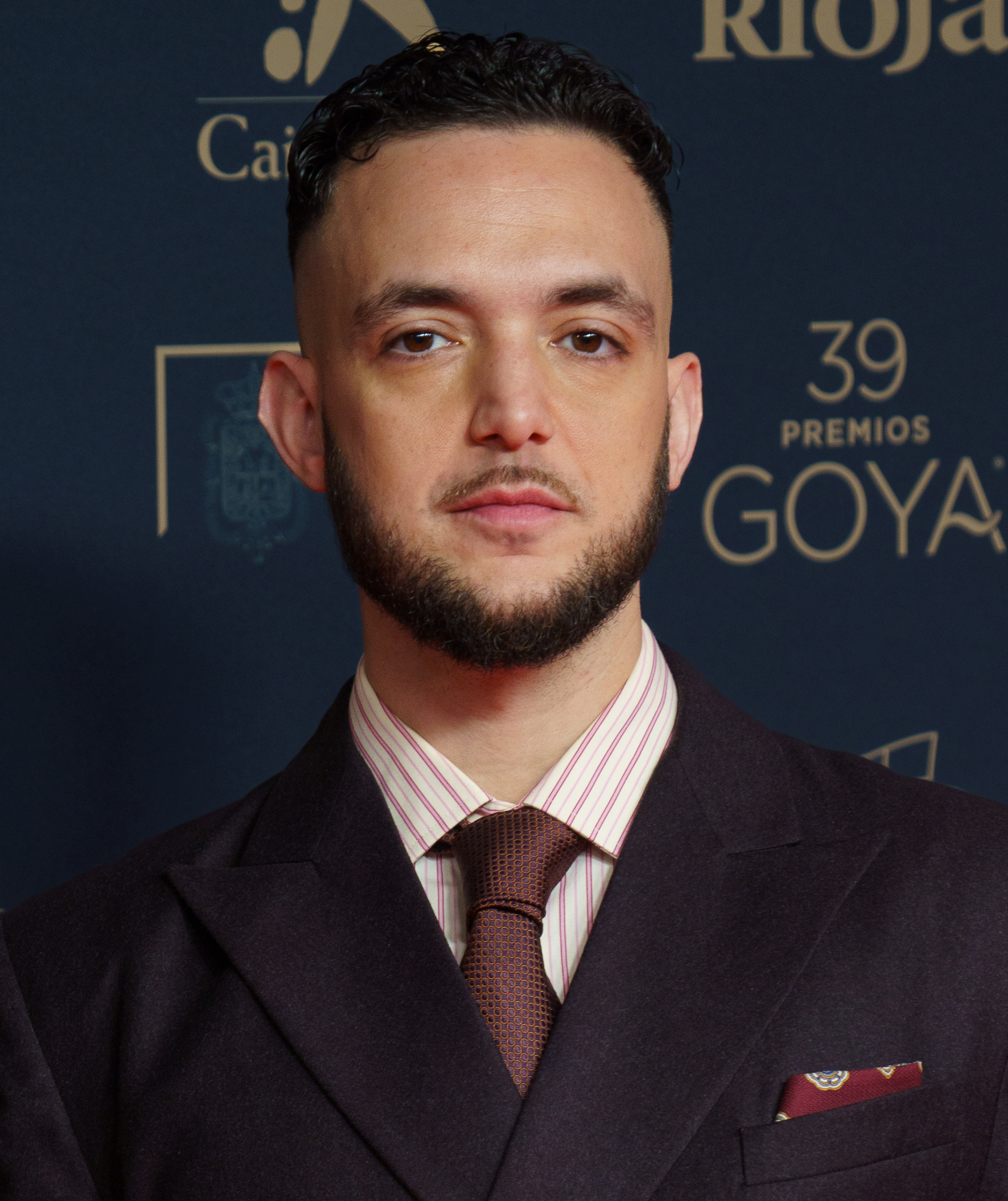
- C. Tangana in 2025

Background information
- Also known as: Crema; El Madrileño; Puchito
- Born: Antón Álvarez Alfaro; July 16, 1990 (age 36); Madrid, Spain
- Genres: Hip hop; new flamenco; pop rap
- Occupations: Rapper; singer; songwriter
- Instrument: Vocals
- Years active: 2006–present
- Labels: Sony Spain; Sony Latin
- Website: ctangana.com

Antón Álvarez Alfaro (born July 16, 1990), known professionally as C. Tangana, is a Spanish rapper. He began his musical career while in high school, rapping under the pseudonym Crema and releasing a seven-track EP titled Él Es Crema (2005). He gained recognition in Spain as a member of the band Agorazein. In 2016, Tangana began performing as a solo act under the stage name C. Tangana.

After releasing a number of singles in 2016, including "Lo Hace Conmigo", "Los Chikos de Madriz" and "Antes de morirme", Tangana attained mainstream success in Spain with the release of "Mala Mujer", later included in his debut studio album Ídolo (2017). He continued to explore urbano and hip hop music on his mixtape Avida Dollars (2018), which spawned the top twenty single "Llorando en la Limo". Tangana continued to release standalone singles to commercial success such as "Bien Duro", "Booty" and "Nunca Estoy". He experimented with flamenco and Latin music on his second studio album El Madrileño (2021), which was nominated for the Premio Ruido and received a Latin Grammy Award nomination for Album of the Year. El Madrileño became the best-selling album in Spain in 2021.

Throughout his career, C. Tangana has won nine Latin Grammy Awards as songwriter and as performer, two Premios Odeón and a LOS40 Music Award among others. He has also been nominated for a Grammy Award, two MTV Europe Music Awards and two UK Music Video Awards. He has made inroads in documentary filmmaking, starring and producing in This Excessive Ambition (2023) and shooting his directorial feature debut The Flamenco Guitar of Yerai Cortés (2024) that won the Goya Award for Best Documentary Film.

== Early life ==
Álvarez was born on July 16, 1990, in Madrid to Antón Álvarez Muñoz, a former journalist, and co-founder of the communication agency Evercom and Patricia Alfaro Águila-Real, a former preschool teacher, who now works for her son's business. He has a younger sister named Ana. His father was born in Vigo to an entirely Galician family, and came to Madrid to study at university, whereas, his mother was born in Ifni and is of Andalusian descent. Álvarez grew up around the Latina and Carabanchel districts, and later as a teenager, moved with his family to Pozuelo de Alarcón. He attended Colegio San Viator.

== Career ==
=== 2005–2007: First steps as Crema ===
In 2005, he gained recognition as Crema as his freestyle demos began spreading online. He focused on rap music and released a seven-track EP titled Él Es Crema (2005) and then two more (Madrid Files and Septiembre) in 2006. After finishing his baccalaureate he studied philosophy at the Complutense University of Madrid.

=== 2011–2016: Agorazein ===
Álvarez formed the band Agorazein with a group of friends in 2011. That year he released a work entitled "C. Tangana", which was generally well-received, attracted many new followers, and was adopted by Álvarez as his new stage name. In 2011 the band released their debut album in Spanish as independent artists titled Kind of Red. Between 2011 and 2012 Álvarez self-released two albums: C. Tangana (2011) and LOVE'S (2012).

Tangana had replaced his particular style of short and direct phrases with short Anglicized phrases. While playing music, he made a living working in a Pans and Company and in a Vodafone call center. He began to shy away from the media in January 2013 because he did not feel comfortable with it. In 2014 he released his first EP as an independent artist titled Trouble + Presidente. In 2015 he left his job to fully work on music. Agorazein released their final album Siempre in November 2016 and have been on an indefinite hiatus since then.

=== 2016–2017: Record deal and Ídolo ===
In 2016, Tangana signed a record deal with Warner Chappell Music and started working regularly with friend and producer Alizzz. His first release as a signed artist was "Antes de morirme", a flamenco-pop collaboration with then-girlfriend Rosalía. The song was a sleeper hit until late 2018, when Rosalía's career started growing internationally and the song was included in the soundtrack of the Spanish Netflix show Élite. Tangana continued releasing songs throughout 2016. In 2017, Álvarez embarked on a tour in Latin America called C. Tangana Latino Tour. When the tour finished, he announced his official agreement with the record company Sony Music Entertainment. In April he released the lead single off his debut album titled "Espabilao". One month later, "Mala Mujer" was released on digital platforms as the album's second single. The song became wildly popular in Spain and in parts of Latin America. The track became a top-five hit in Spain, was named song of the summer, certified three times platinum there, and was also certified gold in the United States. A remix featuring Farruko and French Montana was released in September. Later, C. Tangana performed the track at LOS40 Music Awards 2017, where he was awarded Best New Artist of the Year. The music video for "Mala Mujer" also received a nomination for "Best National Video". He was also nominated at the 2017 MTV Europe Music Awards for Best Spanish Act. His first studio album Ídolo was released on digital download and streaming platforms on October 5, 2017. In December 2017 he released "Guerrera" alongside Dellafuente, which became a top 20 hit in Spain and was certified two times platinum.

=== 2018–2019: Avida Dollars ===
In January 2018, Tangana released the lead single of his debut mixtape as a signed artist: "Still Rapping" with Steve Lean. The song peaked at 86th on the PROMUSICAE chart. In March he released the mixtape's second single "Llorando en la Limo", produced and featuring Alizzz, which peaked at number twelve on the chart and became another summer hit in Spain. The mixtape, Avida Dollars, was released on digital platforms on April 20, 2018, presented with two sold-out shows at La Riviera in Madrid. and was well received by music critics. Since then, Tangana started releasing independent singles such as "Bien Duro", released in June 2018, which peaked at number six in Spain and became the 32nd most sold song in the country. It was certified double platinum. In October, he released his first international collaboration with American singer Becky G. The song, titled "Booty" peaked at number 3 in Spain and became the 93rd best-selling song in Spain in only two months. "Booty" was also certified double platinum in Spain and platinum in the United States. Its music video was nominated for Best Music Video at the 2020 Premios Odeón. In November 2018, Tangana was awarded with two Latin Grammy Awards for writing Rosalía's "Malamente". He took home the awards for Best Alternative Song and Best Urban Fusion/Performance. The track was also nominated for Record of the Year and Song of the Year. He later received the Latin Grammy Award for Album of the Year and for Best Contemporary Pop Vocal Album for his contribution on eight songs on Rosalía's second album El mal querer. In November, he also released "Un Veneno", a minimal, new flamenco track featuring Niño de Elche. It received critical acclaim due to its rawness. On November 21 he performed it on Operación Triunfo 2018. After the performance, he left the stage aggressively despite being scheduled to give an interview, which was received negatively on Twitter. The media coverage the situation received caused an increase in "Un Veneno" streams, making it reach the number two spot on the PROMUSICAE chart and be certified gold in Spain.

During 2019, Tangana continued releasing independent singles. In January he collaborated with Brazilian rapper MC Bin Laden and once again with Alizzz on "Pa' Llamar Tu Atención". The track reached number three on the PROMUSICAE chart. In February he collaborated with Alizzz and Dellafuente once again on "París", which eventually became Tangana's fifth top 10 single. In March 2019 he performed at Lollapalooza Argentina and Chile. He also offered to do a show in Lima and did a showcase in Miami. In April 2019 he moved to Los Angeles. He attended the 2019 Billboard Latin Music Awards and performed at the after-party. While in America, he worked with Chilean-American singer Paloma Mami on his song "No Te Debí Besar", released in September 2019, which marked Mami's debut on the Spanish music charts as well as a new top three hit for Tangana. That same year he collaborated with Argentine rapper Duki and Colombian singer Lao Ra on "5 Stars" and "Picaflor" respectively. A couple of months later, Tangana released "Yelo" alongside Alizzz. In February he collaborated with Natti Natasha on his own track "Viene Y Va" and alongside Tainy and former Fifth Harmony member Lauren Jauregui on the Puerto Rican's "Nada", included in his album The Kids That Grew Up On Reggaeton (2020).

=== 2020–present: Bien, El Madrileño and new musical directions ===
On April 24 he released "Nunca Estoy", which was very well received by critics. It reached the top spot on the PROMUSICAE chart, and became Tangana's first number one hit in his career. The track sampled both "Cómo Quieres Que Te Quiera" by Rosario Flores and "Corazón Partío" by Alejandro Sanz. In May, Tangana announced his first EP as a signed artist, Bien, which was released through Sony Music on May 14, 2020, and debuted number one in Spain. He allied with Little Spain Productions to produce, write and direct his upcoming music videos. In September, Tangana revealed to Forbes that his upcoming studio album would be very different from his previous releases and that it would be named El Madrileño.

On October 8, Tangana released the lead single of El Madrileño. "Demasiadas Mujeres" became popular in Spain; it debuted at the top of the PROMUSICAE chart and being gold-certified in only a week for selling over 20,000 copies. The song contrasted with everything Tangana had done and included a Holy Week marching band from Cádiz. The song included a message of frustration and elements of folk. Its music video included a scene of Tangana's own funeral and references to his past relationships with Rosalía and Berta Vázquez. On November 6, Tangana released "Tú Me Dejaste de Querer", which he called "the most important song of his career". He defined the track as a combination of rumba and bachata with elements of flamenco music. The track broke the record for the most-streamed song in Spain in a 24-hour period with 1.6 million national streams. Internationally, "Tú Me Dejaste de Querer" debuted at number 31 on the Spotify Global chart, marking the first entry of Tangana on the list.

In January 2021, Tangana released the single "Comerte Entera" featuring Toquinho on El Madrileño.

C. Tangana released El Madrileño on February 26, 2021. The album broke records in streaming services, and Tangana became the first Spanish artist to reach No. 1 in the global new albums list and place the whole album's tracklist in the top 25 of Top 100 Songs in Spain. The reissue La Sobremesa includes the song Te Venero which Tangana composed as an hommage to and recorded with the legendary Cuban singer Omara Portuondo. At the 36th Goya Awards ceremony 2022 in Valencia, Tangana presented this song in live TV as a duet with the young Catalan jazz musician Rita Payés. This collaboration was as well a part of the following tour Sin cantar ni afinar.

In July 2023, "Oliveira dos cen anos", a song composed by C. Tangana as an anthem for the 100th anniversary of Galician football club Celta de Vigo, was presented. C. Tangana described it as the most culturally significant piece of his career.

== Artistry ==
His first contact with rap was through the Beastie Boys album Ill Communication (1994) and the movie Fear of a Black Hat, as he mentions in his song "Diez Años". In this subject, he also affirms that his interest in the world of music took place at age eight, through a Michael Jackson cassette of "They Don't Care About Us". Among his influences, he has mentioned Drake's If You're Reading This It's Too Late (2015) and artists like Pharrell Williams or Kanye West, highlighting their ability and tendency to innovate and capture the attention of the public. However, on several occasions He has stated that he listens to music of all styles and that he manages to get something interesting out of everything. His influence does not come from specific musicians, but from musical movements that he embraces in his work, stating that his music is changing due to the new musical trends that arouse greater interest in him.

During his time with Agorazein he was characterized by the use of rhythms and melodies that gave off sadness and rebellion typical of adolescence. The soft sounds of C. Tangana became as important as his voice, giving him a sound treatment that he has managed to maintain as he defends the most creative part of his music. Visually, it also broke the traditional patterns of Spanish hip-hop by moving away from the prevailing aesthetic in most of the world of Hispanic rap, where they still presented the pride of the suburban working class in the face of multinationals, branded clothing and the success and money that surrounded the upper-middle class where C. Tangana grew up.

== Discography ==
=== Studio albums ===
List of studio albums, with selected details, chart positions and sales
Title	Studio album details	Peaks		Certifications
Title	Studio album details	SPA	US Latin Pop	Certifications
Ídolo	Released: October 6, 2017; Label: Sony Spain; Formats: CD, digital download	90	—	
El Madrileño	Released: February 26, 2021; Label: Sony Spain; Formats: CD, digital download	1	8	PROMUSICAE: 4× Platinum
"—" denotes a recording that did not chart or was not released in that territory.

=== Mixtapes ===
List of mixtapes, with selected details, chart positions and sales
Title	Mixtape details	Peaks
Title	Mixtape details	SPA
Avida Dollars	Released: April 10, 2018; Label: Sony Spain; Formats: CD, digital download	34

=== EPs ===
List of EPs, with selected details, chart positions and sales
Title	Mixtape details	Peaks
Title	Mixtape details	SPA
Bien:	Released: May 14, 2020; Label: Sony Spain; Formats: CD, digital download	32

==== As Crema ====
- Madrid Files (Demo) (Solo) (2006)
- Septiembre (Demo) (Solo) (2006)
- ElesCrema (Demo) (Solo) (2006)
- Desde la octava ventana del bloque (Demo) (Solo) (2007)
- EGO (Demo) (Solo) (2007)
- Agorazein (LP, Es Tao Chungo Records) (2008)

==== As C. Tangana ====
- Agorazein presenta: C. Tangana (LP, self-released) (2011)
- LO▼E'S (LP, self-released) (2012)
- Trouble + Presidente (EP, solo) (2014)
- 10/15 (Mixt-tape, solo) (2015)
- Ídolo (LP, Sony Music) (2017)
- Avida Dollars (Mix-tape, Sony Music) (2018)

==== Featuring Agorazein ====
- Agorazein promo (2008)
- Kind of Red (LP, 2011)
- Alternate take No. 1 (2012)
- Alternate take No. 2 (2012)
- Alternate take No. 3 (2012)
- Alternate take No. 4 (2012)
- Siempre (LP, 2016)

==== Featuring Red Bull artist encounters ====
- AGZ0EUZ10LT (EP, 2013)

=== Singles ===
List of singles as lead artist, with selected chart positions, showing year released and album name
Title	Year	Peak chart positions					Certifications	Album
Title	Year	SPA	ARG	BOL	MEX Pop	US Latin Digital	Certifications	Album
"Alligators"	2014	—	—	—	—	—		Non-album singles
"Lo hace conmigo"	2016	—	—	—	—	—		Non-album singles
"Los Chikos de Madriz"	2016	—	—	—	—	—		Non-album singles
"Antes de morirme" (featuring Rosalía)	2016	26	—	—	—	—	PROMUSICAE: 4× Platinum	Non-album singles
"Persiguiéndonos"	2016	—	—	—	—	—		Non-album singles
"Espabilao"	2017	—	—	—	—	—		Ídolo
"Mala Mujer"	2017	5	—	—	—	—	PROMUSICAE: 3× Platinum; AMPROFON: Gold; RIAA: Platinum(Latin)	Ídolo
"Pop Ur Pussy"	2017	—	—	—	—	—		Ídolo
"De Pie"	2017	33	—	—	—	—	PROMUSICAE: Gold	Ídolo
"Tiempo"	2017	—	—	—	—	—		Ídolo
"No te pegas" (solo or featuring A. Chal)	2017	—	—	—	—	—		Ídolo
"Demasiao tarde"	2017	—	—	—	—	—		Ídolo
"Guerrera" (with Dellafuente)	2017	17	—	—	—	—	PROMUSICAE: Platinum	Non-album single
"Still Rapping"	2018	86	—	—	—	—		Avida Dollars
"Llorando en la Limo"	2018	12	—	—	—	—	PROMUSICAE: Platinum	Avida Dollars
"Cuando me miras"	2018	99	—	—	—	—		Avida Dollars
"Traicionero" (featuring Cromo X)	2018	61	—	—	—	—		Non-album singles
"Bien Duro"	2018	6	—	—	—	—	PROMUSICAE: 2× Platinum	Non-album singles
"Booty" (with Becky G)	2018	3	66	—	—	—	PROMUSICAE: 2× Platinum; AMPROFON: Platinum; RIAA: 4× Platinum (Latin)	Non-album singles
"Un Veneno" (with El Niño de Elche)	2018	2	—	—	—	—	PROMUSICAE: 2× Platinum	El Madrileño
"Pa' llamar tu atención" (with Alizzz featuring MC Bin Laden)	2019	6	—	—	—	—	PROMUSICAE: Platinum	Non-album singles
"París" (with Dellafuente and Alizzz)	2019	10	—	—	—	—	PROMUSICAE: Gold	Non-album singles
"Ontas?"	2019	43	—	—	—	—		Non-album singles
"Para repartir" (with Alizzz)	2019	57	—	—	—	—		Non-album singles
"No Te Debí Besar" (with Paloma Mami)	2019	3	—	—	—	—	PROMUSICAE: 2× Platinum; AMPROFON: Gold; RIAA: Platinum (Latin)	Non-album singles
"Pronto llegará" (with Darell)	2019	41	—	—	—	—		Non-album singles
"5 Stars" (with Duki and Neo Pistea featuring Polimá Westcoast)	2019	67	—	—	—	—		Non-album singles
"Picaflor" (with Lao Ra)	2019	59	—	—	—	—		Non-album singles
"Yelo" (with Alizzz)	2020	27	—	—	—	—		Non-album singles
"Viene y Va" (with Natti Natasha)	2020	25	—	—	25	—	RIAA: Gold (Latin)	Non-album singles
"Nada" (with Tainy and Lauren Jauregui)	2020	51	—	—	—	23		Neon16 Tape: The Kids; That Grew Up On Reggaeton
"Nunca Estoy"	2020	1	—	—	—	—	PROMUSICAE: 3× Platinum; RIAA: Gold (Latin)	Bien:( and El Madrileño
"Guille Asesino"	2020	48	—	—	—	—		Bien:(
"Demasiadas Mujeres"	2020	1	68	20	—	—	PROMUSICAE: 2× Platinum	El Madrileño
"Tú Me Dejaste De Querer" (with Niño De Elche & La Húngara)	2020	1	94	—	26	—	PROMUSICAE: 9× Platinum	El Madrileño
"Comerte Entera" (with Toquinho)	2021	8	—	—	—	—	PROMUSICAE: Gold	El Madrileño
"Nominao" (with Jorge Drexler)	2021	6	—	—	—	—		El Madrileño
"Los Tontos" (with Kiko Veneno)	2021	7	—	—	—	—	PROMUSICAE: Gold	El Madrileño
"Ateo" (with Nathy Peluso)	2021	1	76	—	30	—	PROMUSICAE: 5× Platinum; RIAA: Gold (Latin)	Non-album single
"Tocarte" (with Jorge Drexler)	2021	57	—	—	—	—		Non-album single
"La Culpa" (with Omar Montes, Daviles de Novelda / Canelita)	2022	8	—	—	—	—		Non-album single
"Una Y Mil Veces" (with Omar Montes)	2022	11	—	—	—	—		Non-album single
"Estrecho / Alvarado" (with Pablopablo)	2023	16	—	—	—	—		Non-album single
"Oliveira dos cen anos"	2023	59	—	—	—	—		Non-album single
"—" denotes a recording that did not chart or was not released in that territory.

=== Other charted songs ===
List of other charted songs with selected chart positions, showing year released and album name
Title	Year	Peaks	Certifications	Album
Title	Year	SPA	Certifications	Album
"Cuando Me Miras" (featuring Enry-K)	2018	99		Avida Dollars
"Bien:(" (featuring Rusowsky)	2020	47		Bien :(
"adelante_ruffdemo2016"	2020	96		Bien :(
"Cómo habla una mujer" (Paula Cendejas featuring C. Tangana)	2020	89		Non-album song
"Párteme La Cara" (with Ed Maverick)	2021	3	PROMUSICAE: Platinum; PMB: Gold	El Madrileño
"Ingobernable" (with Gipsy Kings, Nicolas Reyes and Tonino Baliardo)	2021	1	PROMUSICAE: 4×Platinum	El Madrileño
"Te Olvidaste" (with Omar Apollo)	2021	17		El Madrileño
"Muriendo de Envidia" (with Eliades Ochoa)	2021	11		El Madrileño
"Cambia!" (with Carin Leon and Adrian Favela)	2021	10		El Madrileño
"Cuándo Olvidaré" (with Pepe Blanco)	2021	22		El Madrileño
"Hong Kong" (with Andrés Calamaro)	2021	15		El Madrileño
"Me Maten (Live at NPR's Tiny Desk)" (with Antonio Carmona)	2021	29		El Madrileño (Live at NPR's Tiny Desk)

==== Other songs ====
- "Cakes" (with Baboon Estudios) (2011)
- "If She Don't" (2011)
- "Bésame Mucho" (2012)
- "Sympósion" (feat. Jerv.agz) (2013)
- "Slang" (with Jerv.agz) (2016)
- "100k Pasos" (with Sticky M.A.) (2016)
- "Llámame más tarde" (feat. Rosalía) (2016)
- "Baile de la lluvia" (2018)

=== Collaborations ===
==== As Crema ====
- Mike – Después de (ft.Crema)
- Adriano Danzziani – Lluvia (ft.Crema)
- Nachorte – Cara B (ft.Crema)
- Chaman – Lógica (ft.Crema)
- Mierda (ft. Crema, Métal, Kefler, Sélok y MackdeRojas)
- Mack de Rojas – Volver a casa (ft. Crema)
- Charlie – Hacer historia (ft. Crema)
- Hombres de negro – Puedo ver las luces (ft. Crema)
- Javo – Aquellos días (ft. Crema)

==== As C. Tangana ====
- Baboon Estudios – Bounce to it (C. Tangana and Razz) (2012)
- Adriano Danzziani – Weed got it (ft. C. Tangana) (Catenaccio, 2012)
- Kaixo – Space Line (ft. C. Tangana and Javier Marcos) (Drop Out, 2013)
- Baboon Estudios – Dealing my pain (ft. C. Tangana and Carlos Alberich) (Trance, 2013)
- Drisket – Protocolo (ft. C. Tangana) (Supermassive Blackholes, 2013)
- Duddi Wallace – Némesis (ft. C. Tangana) (Ropleplay, 2015)
- Elio Toffana – Morir Para Vivir (ft. C. Tangana) (Espíritu de Nuestro Tiempo, 2016)
- Pedro LaDroga – Pedro LaDroga's Ke kiere ase RMX (2016)
- Toscano – Echad Tierra en mi Cuna (B.I.C. Cátedra, 2016)
- Danni Ble – Ondas (2017)
- Farruko, French Montana – Mala Mujer REMIX (2017)
- Guerrera (C.Tangana and Dellafuente) (2017)
- Voyage (C.Tangana y Mpvnter) (2018)
- Ramriddlz – Cha Cha (feat. C. Tangana) (2019)
- Duki – It's a Vibe (with C. Tangana and Khea featuring LeeBrian) (2019)
- Christina Aguilera feat. C. Tangana – Lloras Por Na’ (unreleased song from Aguilera, 2022)
- Christina Aguilera feat. C. Tangana – Dolores (unreleased song from Aguilera, 2022)

== Awards and nominations ==
Award	Year	Category	Nominated work	Result	Ref.
Goya Awards	2024	Best Documentary Film	This Excessive Ambition	Nominated	
Grammy Awards	2022	Best Latin Rock or Alternative Album	El Madrileño	Nominated	
ICON Awards	2019	Music	C. Tangana	Won	
Latin Grammy Awards	2018	Song of the Year	"Malamente" (as songwriter)	Nominated	
Latin Grammy Awards	2018	Best Alternative Song	"Malamente" (as songwriter)	Won	
Latin Grammy Awards	2019	Album of the Year	El Mal Querer (as songwriter)	Won	
Latin Grammy Awards	2019	Best Pop Song	"Pienso en tu mirá" (as songwriter)	Nominated	
Latin Grammy Awards	2021	Album of the Year	El Madrileño	Nominated	
Latin Grammy Awards	2021	Record of the Year	"Te Olvidaste" (featuring Omar Apollo)	Nominated	
Latin Grammy Awards	2021	Best Alternative Song	"Te Olvidaste" (featuring Omar Apollo)	Nominated	
Latin Grammy Awards	2021	Best Alternative Song	"Nominao" (featuring Jorge Drexler)	Won	
Latin Grammy Awards	2021	Best Pop/Rock Song	"Hong Kong" (featuring Andrés Calamaro)	Won	
Latin Grammy Awards	2022	Album of the Year	Tinta y Tiempo (as producer)	Nominated	
Latin Grammy Awards	2022	Record of the Year	"Tocarte" (with Jorge Drexler)	Won	
Latin Grammy Awards	2022	Song of the Year	"Tocarte" (with Jorge Drexler)	Won	
Latin Grammy Awards	2022	Best Short Form Music Video	"Tocarte" (with Jorge Drexler)	Nominated	
Latin Grammy Awards	2024	Best Short Form Music Video	"Oliveira dos cen anos"	Pending	
LOS40 Music Awards	2017	New Artist of the Year	C. Tangana	Won	
LOS40 Music Awards	2017	Video of the Year	"Mala Mujer"	Nominated	
LOS40 Music Awards	2020	Best Spanish Urban Act	C. Tangana	Nominated	
LOS40 Music Awards	2021	Best Spanish Act	C. Tangana	Won	
LOS40 Music Awards	2021	Best Spanish Album	El Madrileño	Nominated	
LOS40 Music Awards	2021	Best Spanish Song	"Tú Me Dejaste de Querer" (with La Húngara & Niño del Elche)	Nominated	
LOS40 Music Awards	2021	Best Spanish Video	"Ingobernable" (with Gipsy Kings, Nicolás Reyes & Tonino Baliardo)	Nominated	
LOS40 Music Awards	2022	Best Tour, Festival or Concert	Sin cantar, ni afinar	Nominated	
LOS40 Music Awards	2022	Best Spanish Video	"Ateo" (with Nathy Peluso)	Nominated	
LOS40 Music Awards	2022	Best Spanish Collaboration	"Ateo" (with Nathy Peluso)	Nominated	
MTV Europe Music Awards	2017	Best Spanish Act	C. Tangana	Nominated	
MTV Europe Music Awards	2021	Best Spanish Act	C. Tangana	Nominated	
Premios Odeón	2020	Best Male Artist	C. Tangana	Nominated	
Premios Odeón	2020	Best New Artist	C. Tangana	Nominated	
Premios Odeón	2020	Video of the Year	"Booty" (with Becky G)	Nominated	
Premios Odeón	2021	Best Urban Artist	C. Tangana	Won	
Premios Odeón	2021	Best Urban Song	"Tú Me Dejaste De Querer" (featuring Niño de Elche and La Húngara)	Nominated	
Premios Odeón	2021	Video of the Year	"Tú Me Dejaste De Querer" (featuring Niño de Elche and La Húngara)	Nominated	
Premios Odeón	2022	Album of the Year	El Madrileño	Won	
Premios Odeón	2022	Best Pop Album	El Madrileño	Nominated	
Premios Odeón	2022	Song of the Year	"Ingobernable" (with Gipsy Kings, Nicolas Reyes and Tonino Baliardo)	Nominated	
Premios Odeón	2022	Best Pop Song	"Ingobernable" (with Gipsy Kings, Nicolas Reyes and Tonino Baliardo)	Nominated	
Premios Odeón	2022	Best Pop Artist	Himself	Nominated	
Premios Odeón	2022	Best Urban Song	"Ateo" (with Nathy Peluso)	Nominated	
Premios Odeón	2022	Best Alternative Song	"Párteme la Cara" (with Ed Maverick)	Won	
Premios Tu Música Urbano	2020	Top Urbano Europa	C. Tangana	Nominated	
Rolling Stone en Español Awards	2023	Song of the Year	"Tocarte" (with Jorge Drexler)	Nominated	
UK Music Video Awards	2020	Best Lockdown Video	"Guille Asesino"	Nominated	
UK Music Video Awards	2021	Best Rock Video – International	"Maldito" (with The Parrots)	Nominated	
Berlin Music Video Awards	2019	Best Art Director	Cuando Me Miras	Nominated	

- Note: At the 22nd Annual Latin Grammy Awards, El Madrileño won Best Engineered Album, the award went to Orlando Aispuro Meneses, Daniel Alanís, Alizzz, Rafa Arcaute, Josdán Luis Cohimbra Acosta, Miguel De La Vega, Máximo Espinosa Rosell, Alex Ferrer, Luis Garcié, Billy Garedella, Patrick Liotard, Ed Maverick, Beto Mendonça, Jaime Navarro, Alberto Pérez, Nathan Phillips, Harto Rodríguez, Federico Vindver, Delbert Bowers, Alex Ferrer, Jaycen Joshua, Nineteen85, Lewis Pickett, Alex Psaroudakis, Raül Refree and Chris Athens, as recording engineers, mixers and mastering engineer.
