= Oliveira dos cen anos =

Single by C. Tangana
- Language: Galician
- Released: July 7, 2023
- Studio: Planta Sónica, Vigo; Disquesi, A Coruña
- Genre: Galician folk music; folktronica
- Length: 3:19
- Label: Sony Music
- Composers: Antón Álvarez Alfaro; Alizzz; Pablopablo; Harto Rodríguez
- Lyricists: Antón Álvarez Alfaro; Pablo Drexler; Cristian Quirante Catalán; Xosé Lois Romero; Xisco Feijoó; Simeón Canto Gavira; Quico Comesaña

C. Tangana singles chronology
"Estrecho / Alvarado" (2023)	"Oliveira dos cen anos" (2023)

"Oliveira dos cen anos" (Galician for "Olive Tree of 100 Years), is the name of the hymn created in honour of the RC Celta de Vigo's centenary. The song was released by the Spanish rapper C. Tangana, real name Antón Álvarez Alfaro. The music was written by Álvarez himself and his common collaborators: Alizzz, Pablopablo, alongside Harto Rodríguez. The lyrics were also written by C. Tangana, Pablo Drexler, Alizzz, Xosé Lois Romero, Xisco Feijoó, Quico Comesaña, and Keltoi! (a local band from Vigo) vocalist Sime. It was performed by Casablanca Choir, As Lagharteiras, Lilaina, Cantó, Drexler and Quirante. C. Tangana wrote the lyrics in Galician even though he is not fluent in the language.

The music video for the song, directed by C. Tangana and produced by his company, Little Spain, received three Gold Cannes Lions at the 2024 Cannes Lions International Festival of Creativity. It has also been nominated for Best Short Form Music Video at the 25th Annual Latin Grammy Awards.

== History ==
Back in 2021, Radio Vigo's Twitter account posted a poll asking their followers to vote for which artist they wanted to compose Celta's centenary anthem. The poll had four contenders, –Iván Ferreiro, Siniestro Total, Carlos Núñez Muñoz, and local duo Tony Lomba and Eladio. While scrolling through social media, C. Tangana saw the poll and replied to it, asking: "Can I Try?". Álvarez is of Galician descent and has been a life-long supporter of the team, having cited Aleksandr Mostovoi, as his favourite player, even appearing at some Celta matches in his jersey. Despite his staunch support for the team, his allegiance to the team was an object of debate, as the rapper was born in Madrid, and had built his artistic image around that fact. Faced with criticism the musician stated: "If the fans don't want [me to do] it, I'll pass".

After a year of speculation, Celta's president, Carlos Mouriño confirmed that the rapper had been contacted, but at the time did not yet reveal if he was ultimately chosen, however did confirm the idea of it being almost certain some time later. In the summer of 2022, C. Tangana played a show in the city, and congratulated the team on its 99th anniversary, while on stage. In March 2023, a huge banner was hung in the city centre, featuring Alvarez's "Can I Try?" tweet, finally confirming his involvement.

=== Composition ===
On the same day that his participation was confirmed, the musician arrived in Vigo and spent two weeks in the region, to better understand Traditional Galician Music. To do so he contacted many local folk artists, among the names who helped him are Rodrigo Romani, Pedro Feijoo and Alfredo Dourado. From many national ideas that were incorporated the artist believes that the most important ones were the incorporations of the pandeireteiras and cantareiras (both groups of female singers, with the former, such as Lagharteiras, using tambourines). "This combination of female voices, always in a choir, almost never as soloists, playing percussion, all together, for me is the most moving thing there is musically in the whole world," Álvarez says.

=== Lyrics ===
The lyrics are written entirely in Galician, and are strongly influenced by the culture of the region, Vigo, and the club. The mentions of blue and light blue represent the main colour of the sky-blue team and the Galician flag. The lyrics also reference the Ondas do mar de Vigo poem almost citing it. The repeating phrase of "Un escudo no meu peito" also comes from a local text, although a more modern one, being from the Keltoi! song 1923. That song is unofficially considered to be the anthem of the club. The title itself refers to the Coat of arms of Vigo and the team's centenary.

== Reception ==
The release received international praise from many different sources. The New York Times has included the song its list of the 10 most notable songs of the week, as did Billboard in a similar list. Billboard has also done a survey to decide which of the songs was the readers' favorite, with the anthem finishing in first place. The British newspaper The Guardian described the song as "The result of intense research and modern pop nous, fusing tradition and modernity to create what could be one of the most artistically ambitious football anthems of recent times."

Among the positive critics there were also countless legends of the club, including the players who are still on the team.
