= Eduardo (album) =

Studio album by Ed Maverick
- Released: 30 April 2021
- Recorded: 2019–2020
- Studio: Topetitud Studios (Mexico City)
- Genre: Folk; sadcore; neo-psychedelia; alterlatino
- Length: 44:11
- Language: Spanish
- Label: Universal Mexico
- Producer: Camilo Froideval

Ed Maverick chronology
Transiciones (2019)	Eduardo (2021)

Singles from Eduardo
- 1. "Niño" Released: 30 April 2021

Eduardo (stylized in all lowercase) is the third studio album by Mexican singer-songwriter Ed Maverick, released on 30 April 2021, by Universal Music Mexico. Mainly written by Maverick and produced by Camilo Froideval during the COVID-19 pandemic, it was his "musical comeback" after his temporary retirement at the end of 2019.

Eduardo is a self-reflective record about Maverick's life with his unexpected fame and cyberharassment, as well as a relationship that leads nowhere. Eduardo Demos, a reissue of the album with eight demo tracks, was released in May 2022.

== Background and release ==
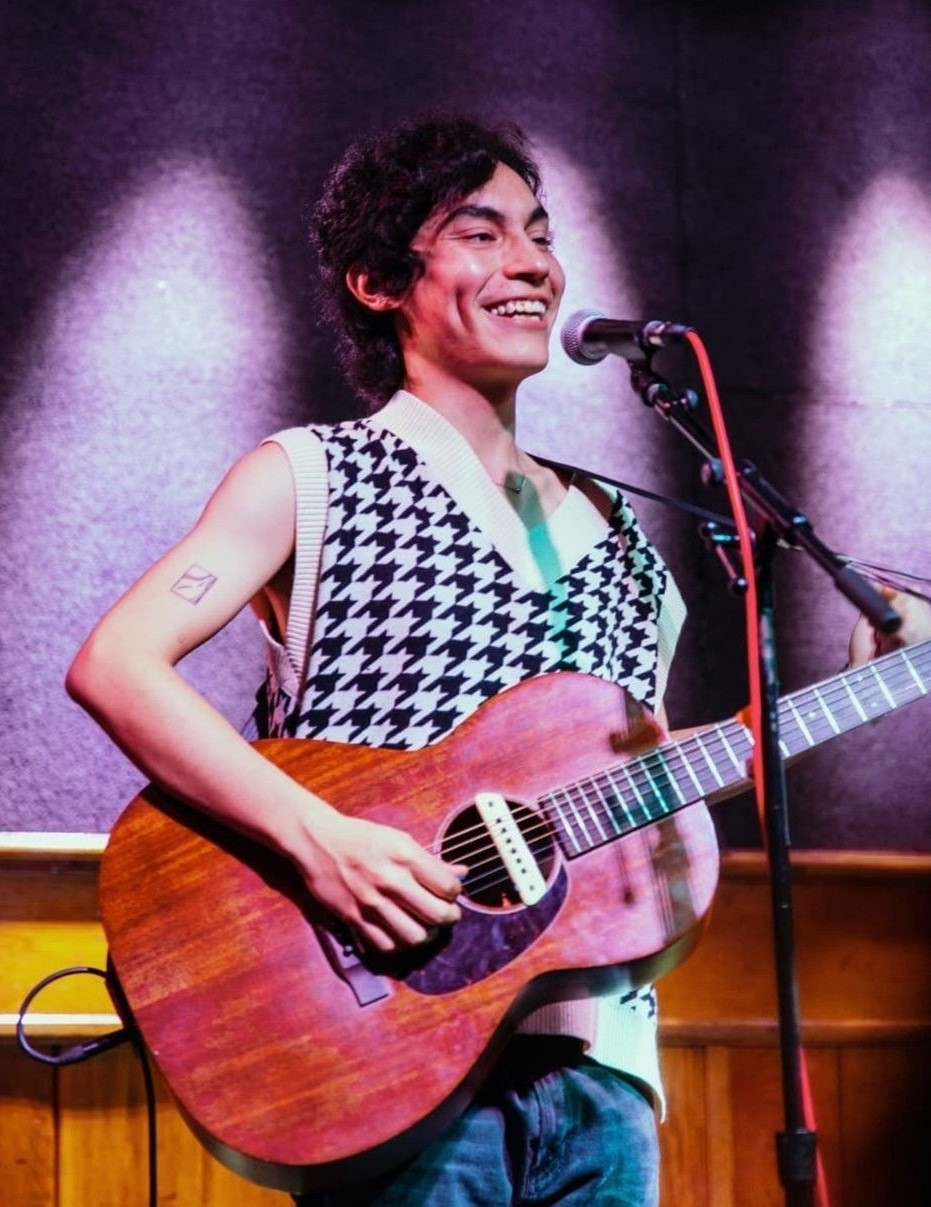
Maverick in July 2021

During his debut in music scene and the sudden commercial success of his first two records during 2018 and 2019, in part thanks to the popularity of his music on social media, Maverick began to suffer a series of harassment and ridicule in the same media that made him famous, receiving almost daily messages inciting hatred, suicide and death threats directed towards him and his family. Finally, in November 2019, Maverick made a statement on his Twitter account explaining his opinion about the harassment.

"At first I followed the jokes because I didn't know how to react so that they would stop, I need to take a break"

— Ed Maverick

He disappeared from the media and social networks for the rest of 2019, throughout 2020 he made small appearances, in the whole year he only released a live album titled Ed Maverick en el Metropólitan (transl. "Ed Maverick at the Metropólitan"), which had already been recorded during his presentation at that venue in 2019. Maverick repeatedly shared that he was working on a new album, just weeks before the released of the debut EP, when Maverick shared through Twitter, as a joke and along with an unfinished tracklist, his first idea for the name of the album: «go to hell, everyone, I don't want to be here for 2 more days here and I'm going to Tlaxcala, I already told you». Although the album title was a joke, 4 of the 5 title tracks shown were part of the final cut, being "Ropa de Bazar" released with Bratty as a single from the live album, two years before Eduardo.

In September 2020 he released Esto No Tiene Nada Que Ver con Eduardo (transl. "This Has Nothing to Do With Eduardo"), his debut 5-track extended play with a more experimental sound compared to his previous recordings and that, in a certain way, has a similar sound to Eduardo, the EP didn't released singles and no music videos were made for its promotion, nor was it released in CD or LP record.

Finally on 15 April 2021, Maverick confirmed via Twitter that his new album was already being uploaded to digital platforms, and the following day he shared a screenshot showing the full length of the album; forty-four minutes and eleven seconds,. Over the course of the days that followed, Ed tweeted a countdown, finally revealing the album's release date on 25 April 2021, and making its title official, and on 27 April 2021, the album cover was revealed, this was designed by Maverick himself, which consists of a painting with 6 different versions of him in a forest background, in the words of the artist, represents:

The long-haired Eduardos are ideas that overwhelmed me, that overwhelm me or will overwhelm me, I guess. The short-haired Eduardo is me 3 years ago and is me today.

Eduardo was recorded at Topetitud Studios in Mexico City, owned by Paco Ayala and Tito Fuentes of Molotov, the same recording studio where Contra (2010) by Vampire Weekend was recorded. It's an album with elements of latin alternative, folk music, neo-psychedelia and sadcore, also encompassing some experimental overtones. In an interview for Rolling Stone in Spanish, Maverick thought of the album as a two-part story, the first showing the beginning of a relationship that doesn't really lead anywhere, and the second showing a deeper, more reflective side of his life and sudden fame. This is also reflected in its title, which was chosen as self-titled album.

I made this album during a phase where I felt like I was running into the same issues, like they were on a loop. A lot of it is about acknowledging that there are loops that have to be broken, and that you can't stay where you are and expect them to change.

— Ed Maverick, Rolling Stone

== Promotion ==
=== Singles ===
Three music videos were directed by the Mexican director, Hermann Neudert, and produced by his video production company, Neuderts. The same company that also filmed the music videos of "Fuentes de Ortiz", "Acurrucar", "A Mis Amigos" and "Siempre Estoy Pa Ti". For its promotion, only "Niño" (featuring Muelas de Gallo) was released as a single, being sent to Mexican radio the same day the album was released. "Gente" and a double video for Contenta and Atnetnoc" were also released. "Niño" music video received a nomination for Video of the Year at the 2021 MTV Millennial Awards, but lost to "La Noche de Anoche" by Bad Bunny and Rosalía.

- "Niño" (2021)
- "Gente" (2021)
- "Contenta / Atnetnoc" (2022)

=== Tour ===
Tour Eduardo
- Tour by Ed Maverick
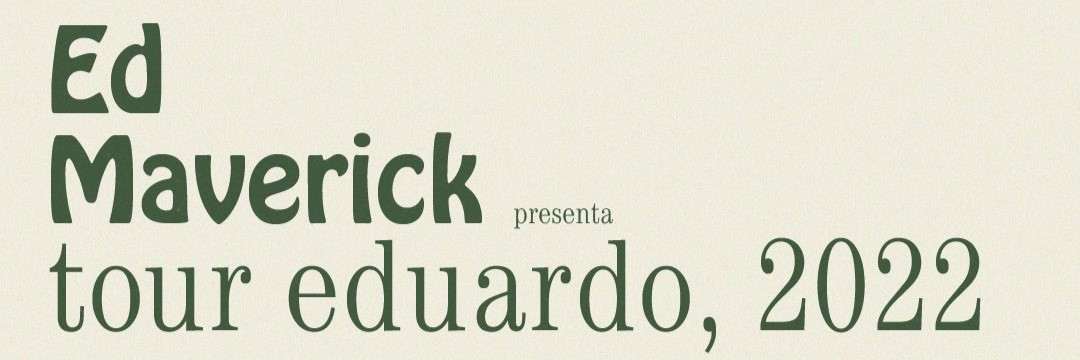
- Associated album: Eduardo
- Start date: 7 July 2022
- End date: 4 November 2022
- No. of shows: 20

Tour Eduardo was the debut world tour by Maverick, announced by him in August 2022. with which he performed in cities from South America and the US, and for the first time in European countries such as the United Kingdom, Spain and the Netherlands. No dates in Mexico were included for the tour.

Tour dates
Date	City	Country	Venue
Europe
7 July 2022	Bilbao	Spain	Bilbao BBK Live
15 July 2022	Cartagena	Spain	Noches del Botánico
16 July 2022	Madrid	Spain	La Mar de Músicas
17 July 2022	Benicàssim	Spain	Festival Int. de Benicàssim
19 July 2022	Oviedo	Spain	Tiempos Nuevos
20 July 2022	Barcelona	Spain	Secreto a Voces
21 July 2022	London	England	The Jazz Cafe
23 July 2022	Amsterdam	Netherlands	Paradiso Provenzal
U.S. & South America
19 August 2022	Chicago	United States	Ruido Fest
21 August 2022	Dallas	United States	Studio at the Factory
24 August 2022	Bogotá	Colombia	The Bonfire
26 August 2022	Quito	Ecuador	Soundgarden
27 August 2022	Guayaquil	Ecuador	Funka Festival
30 August 2022	Lima	Peru	CCB
1 September 2022	Santiago	Chile	Teatro Coliseo
2 September 2022	Buenos Aires	Argentina	Vorterix
26 October 2022	San Francisco	United States	The Independent
29 October 2022	Los Angeles	United States	Hollywood Forever
2 November 2022	New York City	United States	Knockdown Center
4 November 2022	Austin	United States	Empire Garage

== Critical reception ==
Pablo Monroy for Rolling Stone en Español, wrote that thanks to Eduardo, his collaboration with C. Tangana on the album El Madrileño of the same year, and his honest lyrics, he became one of his magazine's "Promises Fulfilled". He also mentioned that his style, sound and lyrics were favorably influenced by artists such as Chalino Sánchez and Sufjan Stevens.

Luis Mainés from Mondo Sonoro gave it 8 out of 10 and wrote that "the songs that Ed Maverick has sown and that flourish in Eduardo do so with the aroma of the songs of yesteryear. The singer-songwriter is an ancient soul that speaks to us from the depths of the American continent. And the thing is that despite its universality, Ed Maverick's music cannot be understood without roots settled in the land where he was born. Eduardo lives in the same universe as "On The Road" and as a child from the last century playing cowboys and Indians. In the Mexico where the hippies of the 60s went to smoke cannabis. Dense, warm and deep. This is the music that Maverick leaves us with in Eduardo. Also simple, emotional and timeless. There is something in Ed Maverick that does not place us in the middle of 2021. And that is what makes it so interesting."

In November 2021 he won the Mexican Singer of the Year award at the GQ Men of the Year Awards. At the end of 2021, Rolling Stone magazine placed it at number 26 on its annual list of The 35 Best Spanish-Language Albums of 2021, placing it in fourth place as the best album by a Mexican artist of the year, just behind Calibre 50's Vamos Bien, Natalia Lafourcade's Un Canto por México, Vol. 2 and Zoé's Sonidos De Karmática Resonancia.

=== Year-end lists ===
Select year-end rankings of Eduardo
Publication/critic	Accolade	Rank	Ref.
Rolling Stone	The 35 Best Spanish-Language Albums of 2021	26	

== Track listing ==
All tracks are produced by Camilo Froideval.

Eduardo track listing
No.	Title	Writer(s)	Length
1.	"Hola, ¿Cómo Estás?"	Ed Maverick	4:01
2.	"Ensenada"	Maverick	3:43
3.	"Mantra I"	Maverick	1:40
4.	"Mantra II"	Maverick	4:04
5.	"Contenta"	Maverick	3:46
6.	"Atnetnoc"	Maverick	1:54
7.	"(¿Por Qué Lloras?)"	Maverick	2:06
8.	"Gente"	Maverick	3:08
9.	"Niño (featuring Muelas de Gallo)"	Maverick; Anibal Lavana Martinez	4:27
10.	"Días Azules"	Maverick	4:14
11.	"Gracias"	Maverick	5:09
12.	"Nos Queda Mucho Dolor Por Recorrer (featuring Daniel Quién)"	Maverick; Oscar Daniel Hernández Lomelí	5:53
Total length:			44:11

=== Notes ===
- Tracks 1 to 11 are stylized with a semicolon at the end and track 12 with a stop
- The tracks are also stylized in lowercase, except for 7, the only one in uppercase

== Release history ==
Release dates and formats for Eduardo
Region	Date	Format(s)	Label	Catalogue	Ref.
Various	30 April 2021	Streaming; digital download	Universal	N/A	
Mexico	30 April 2021	CD; LP	Universal	00602438359219	
Mexico	28 November 2022	Box set (Note: The box set included the double LP record, a t-shirt and an autographed lithograph.)	Universal	00602448118066	
