= Ed Maverick =

Mexican singer-songwriter (born 2001)

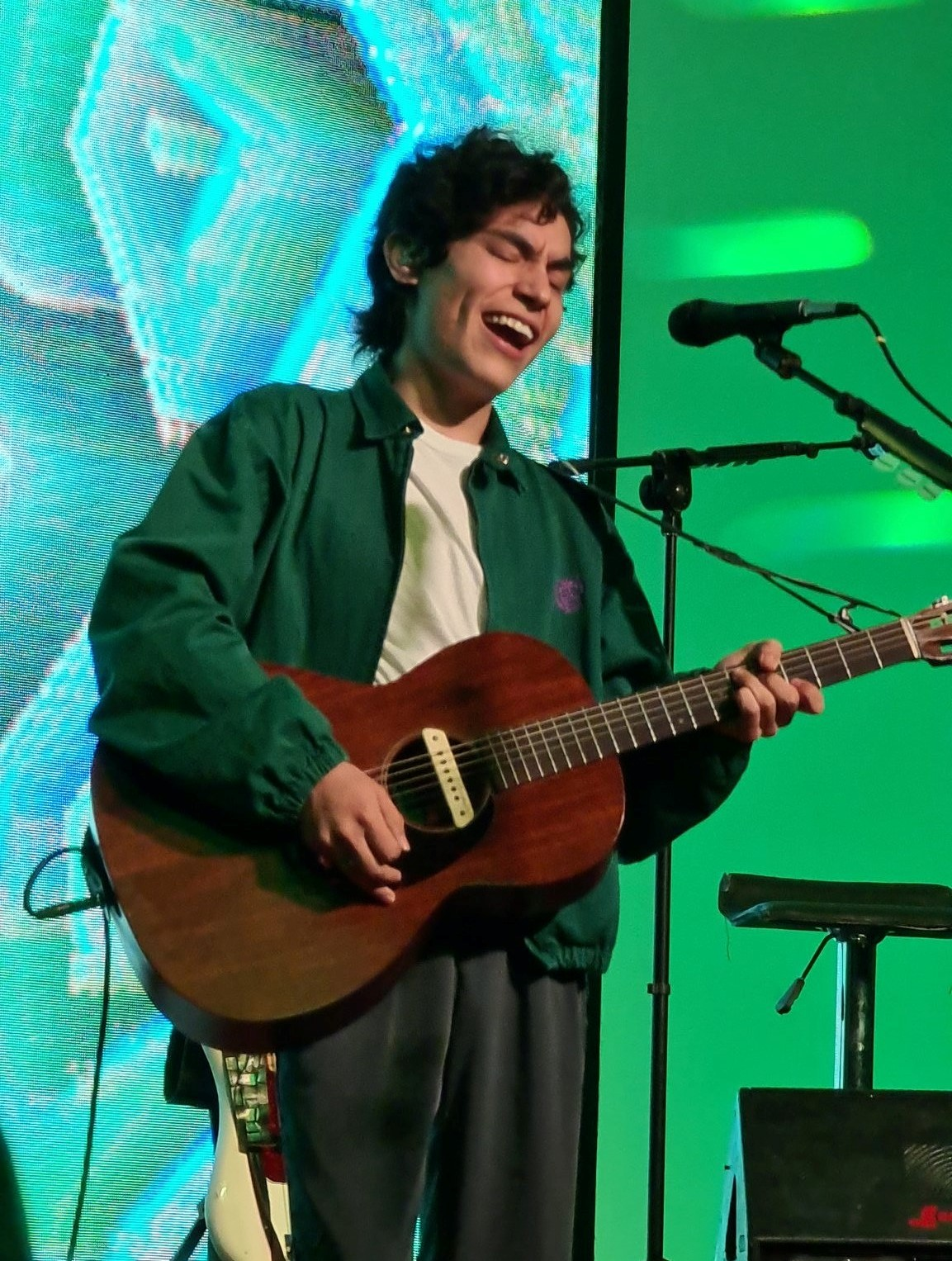
- Maverick performing in 2021
- Born: Eduardo Hernández Saucedo; 19 January 2001 (age 25); Delicias, Chihuahua, Mexico
- Other names: Eddie; El Niño de Oro
- Occupations: Singer; songwriter; musician
- Years active: 2018–present
- Awards: Full list
- Musical career
- Genres: Folk; folk rock; indie rock; neo-psychedelia
- Instruments: Vocals; acoustic guitar; electric guitar; synthesizer; electric bass; drums; banjo
- Label: Universal Mexico

Eduardo Hernández Saucedo (born 19 January 2001), known professionally as Ed Maverick, is a Mexican singer-songwriter and musician of folk and alternative music. He began his career by sharing his songs on social media, and rose to prominence with his debut album Mix Pa' Llorar en tu Cuarto (2018), which included the hit single "Fuentes de Ortiz", later certified diamond by AMPROFON. Following his signing with Universal Music México in 2019, the album was reissued and peaked at number two on the Mexican albums chart.

In 2021, Maverick released his self-titled album Eduardo and appeared on C. Tangana's El Madrileño with the track "Párteme la Cara", which reached the top five of the Spanish singles chart. The collaboration earned him a Latin Grammy Award for Best Engineered Album, as a credited audio engineer on the album, and an Odeón Award. He has also worked with artists including Bratty and Señor Kino, and received nominations at the MTV MIAW Awards and MTV Europe Music Awards. As of March 2025, Maverick has accumulated over 1.1 million certified album-equivalent units worldwide. (Note: This figure is the sum of his albums and singles certifications: In Mexico, Maverick has sold 920,000 units, with the sum of his multi-platinum certified singles & albums.; In Spain, his single "Parteme la cara" is 2x platinum and "Fuentes de Ortiz" is platinum, equivalent to 180,000 units.; In Brasil, he has a gold single for 20,000 units.)

== Bio ==
=== 2001–2017: early years ===
Eduardo Hernádez Saucedo was born on 19 January 2001, in Delicias, a town located in the Mexican state of Chihuahua. During his high school years, he taught himself to play the guitar. The first song he learned to play was Jake Bugg's "Simple As This". He began composing in his hometown in addition to performing at parties, events and other public places in mid-2017. In addition to starting to upload song covers to his YouTube channel. Among his influences to start composing are some Mexican artists such as Dromedarios Mágicos, Juan Cirerol and Little Jesus.

=== 2018–2020: MPLLETC, Transiciones and rise to fame ===
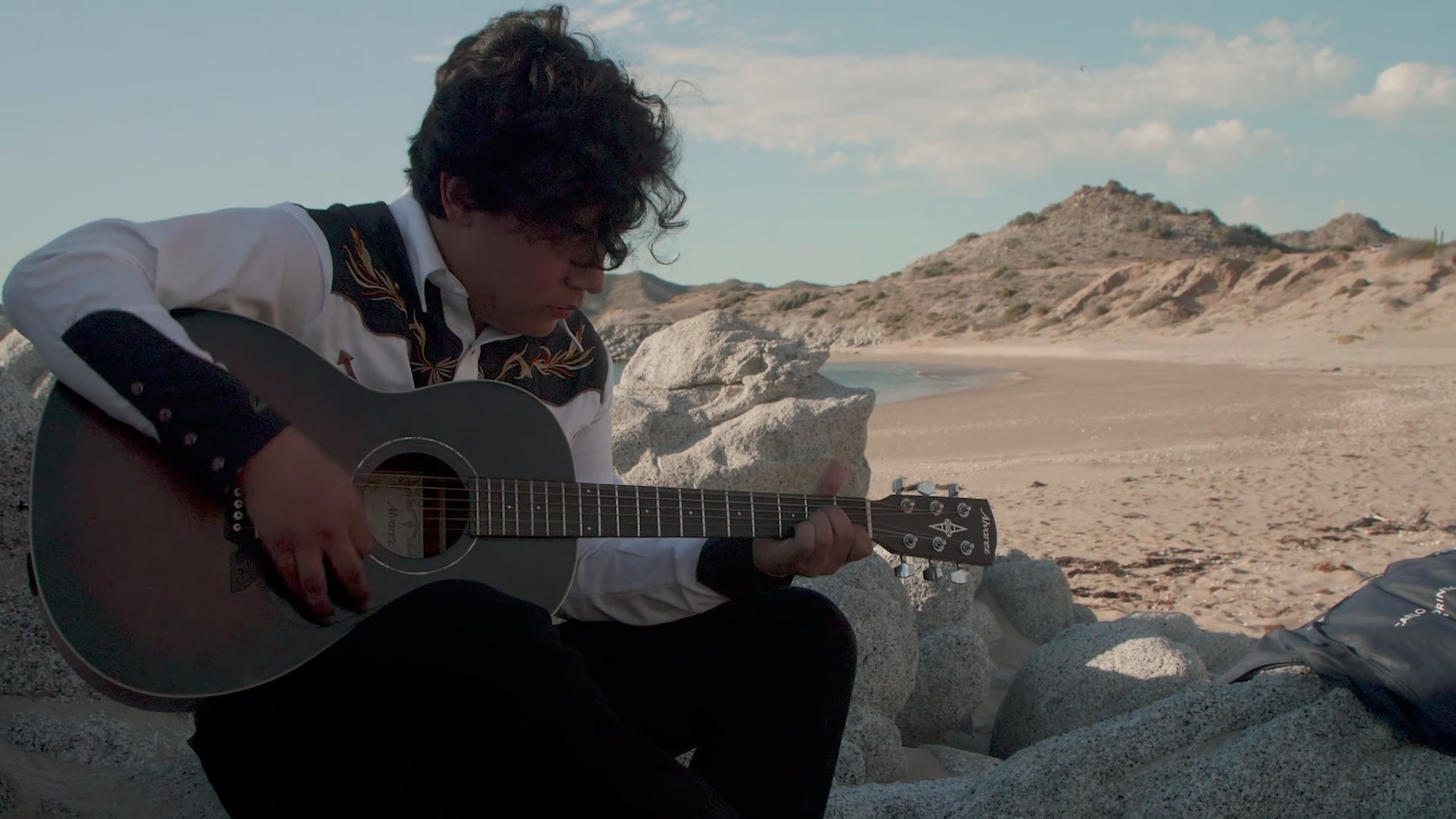
Maverick on the set of the music videos of "Acurrucar" and "Fuentes de Ortiz".

The independent record label Eidan Box Records, located in Chihuahua, invited him to record songs in their studios, and he began to record songs on said label, to later release them on digital platforms. In 2018, Maverick released his debut studio album entitled Mix pa' llorar en tu cuarto through Eidan Box. The song "Fuentes de Ortiz", his second song written by himself was included on the album; and with the passing of the months went viral on social media and would end up becoming his first commercial success, an early cut of a music video for "Fuentes de Ortiz" was recorded and released.

In December 2018, Maverick traveled to Mexico City at the "band bazaar", a massive event where independent artists sell their merchandise and perform live, during the event Maverick met rapper Lng/SHT and got his contact. As the days passed, Lng/SHT called him to have a meeting with manager Chok Fermoso.

Fermoso signed Maverick to his talent agency, becomes his manager, and gets him a record deal with Universal Music Mexico in March 2019, his debut album was reissued in physical stores and digital platforms under the Universal label, and then reached number two on the Mexican Albums Chart, "Fuentes de Ortiz" and "Acurrucar" were released as singles from the album, and a music video for "Fuentes de Ortiz" was reshot. By May 2019, Maverick had already become one of the most viral Mexican artists on Spotify. That same year he performed for the first time at the National Auditurium's "Lunario" and the Teatro Metropolitán in Mexico City, setting the record for being the Mexican artist who sold out his dates at the venue the fastest. In the same year his debut album received a gold record from the Asociación Mexicana de Productores de Fonogramas (AMPROFON). He released his second studio album Transiciones (2019).

Through his rapidly growing fame in Mexico, Maverick suffered from a massive attack perpetuated by fans and some digital creators on social networks, receiving almost daily messages inciting hate, suicide and death threats directly towards him and his family. In November 2019, he released a statement through Twitter in which he explained that he would close his account and stay away of the media for a while. In the external statement:

"I don’t want to go too far, I just want to clarify one thing about it: if at first I was joking and following your bullying, it was because I didn’t know how to react so that all of you would stop. Literally if I complained you guys were going to throw me more, but if I said it didn’t affect me it could be the same, so I’m at a point where I don’t know if I had to react or if what I did was right, it’s weird. And it’s not like I want to normalize that you guys crossed the line between joking and bullying. I’m so confused, I’m thinking too many things at the same time and I need to rest."

— Ed Maverick, on Twitter

In 2020 he reappeared with the live album Ed Maverick en el Metropólitan (2020) performing the hits of his first two albums and included the song "Ropa de Bazar" with Bratty, and at the beginning of the same year the AMPROFON gave him the diamond record for "Fuentes de Ortiz" for selling over 300,000 equivalent units, double platinum for "Acurrucar", platinum and gold for "Del Río" and "Ropa de Bazar", platinum for "Quiero" and Mix Pa' Llorar en Tu Cuarto, and the gold record for "Siempre Estoy Pa' Ti" and "WRU". In addition to the release of his debut EP Esto No Tiene Nada Que Ver con Eduardo.

=== 2021–present: Eduardo ===
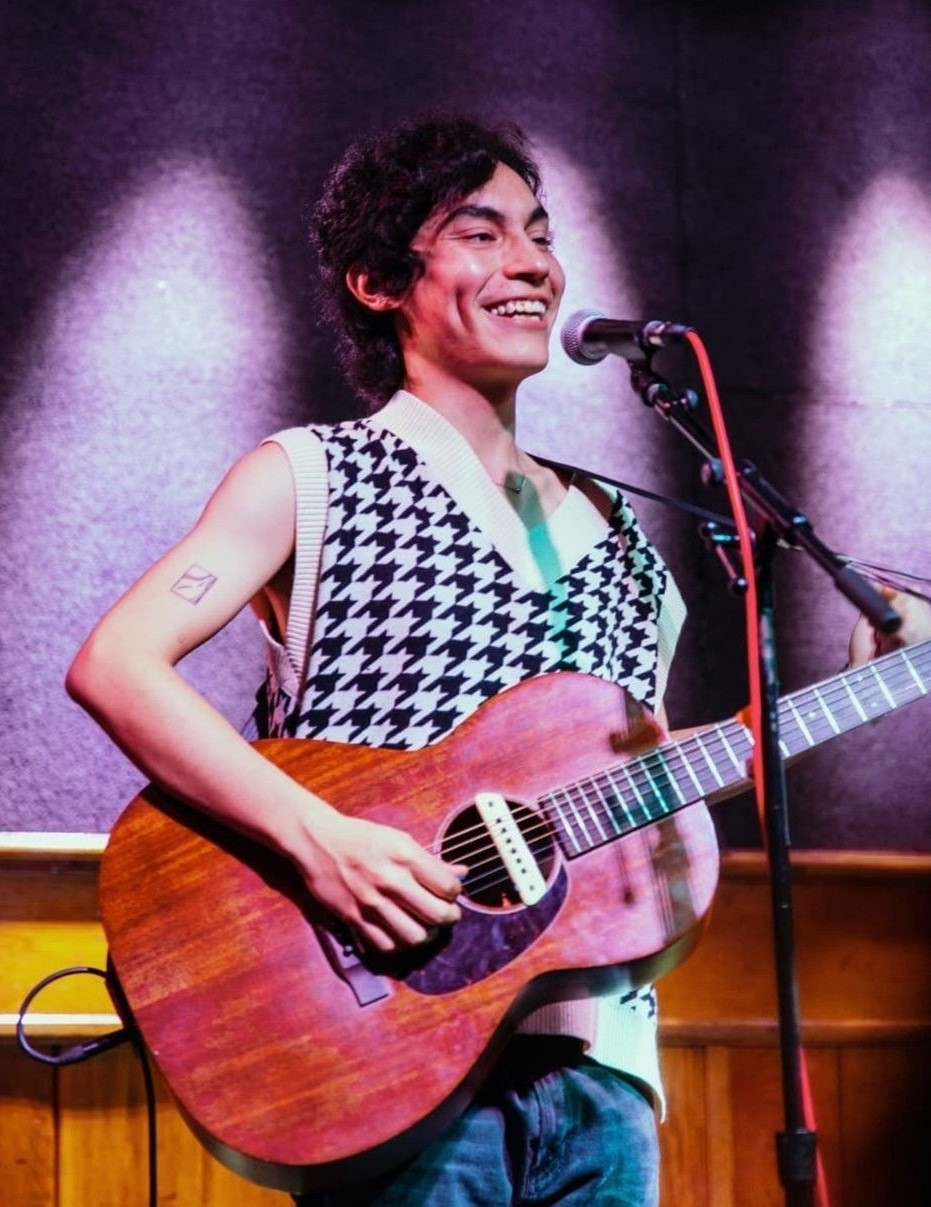
Maverick performing in Mexico City in 2021.

During 2021, Maverick released his third studio album titled Eduardo, in which the events of the harassment episode in his life were reflected in the songs "Gente", "Niño," and "Gracias". Rolling Stone magazine ranked it 26 at the 35 best Spanish-language albums of 2021.

In the same year he collaborated with C. Tangana, on the song "Párteme la cara" included on the album El Madrileño (2021) reaching the number three on the singles chart in Spain, and was certified double platinum in Spain, gold in Brazil and platinum in Mexico. This collaboration credited him as album engineer and earned him his first Latin Grammy Award for Best Engineered Album at the 22nd ceremony. In October, Maverick formed the band Los Milagro, along with Mexican musician Daniel Quién and producer Wet Baes, and left it in May 2023.

In 2022 he won the Odeon Award from the Intellectual Rights Management Association (AGDI) for the Best Alternative Song of 2022 in Spain, being the first Mexican artist awarded at that ceremony. In April he performed for the first time at the Coachella music festival, in May he released a series of demos from the Eduardo album.

In July 2022, the Cartagena City Council recognized him at the Spanish festival "La Mar de Músicas" with the 2nd Paco Martín Award for "Breakthrough Artist of Global Music," at the proposal of the jury made up of different Spanish journalists from the Paco Martín Cultural Association. The jury explaining their choice by saying: "He represents like nobody else the new wave of singers who dazzle with their sensitivity, simplicity and naturalness. His voice, deep, melancholy, warm and full of nuances, is one of the most special on the international scene. He provokes emotion, intimacy and pause from the first verse, as if he were singing to us a few meters away accompanied by his young guitar". That same month, he announced his first world tour entitled "Tour Eduardo", with dates in Latin America and the United States, as well as, for the first time, in European countries such as the United Kingdom, Spain and the Netherlands.

== Discography ==
Studio albums

- Mix pa' llorar en tu cuarto (2018)
- Transiciones (2019)
- Eduardo (2021)
- La nube en el jardín (2024)

== Awards and nominations ==
Name of the award, year presented, award category, nominee work and the result of the nomination
Award	Year	Category	Nominee(s)/work(s)	Result	Ref.
La Mar de Músicas	2022	Breakthrough Artist	Himself	Won	
Latin Grammy Awards	2021	Best Engineered Album	El Madrileño (as music engineer)	Won	
Lunas del Auditorio	2019	Best New Artist	Himself	Won	
MTV Europe Music Awards	2019	Best Latin America North Act	Himself	Nominated	
MTV MIAW Awards	2019	Emerging Artist	Himself	Nominated	
MTV MIAW Awards	2021	Music-ship of the Year	"Niño"	Nominated	
MTV MIAW Awards	2021	Video of the Year	"Párteme la Cara"	Nominated	
GQ Men of the Year Awards	2021	Mexican Singer of the Year	Himself	Won	
Odeón Awards	2022	Best Alternative Song	"Párteme la Cara"	Won	
Telehit Awards	2019	Best Mexican Act	Himself	Nominated	
Telehit Awards	2019	Breakthrough Artist	Himself	Won	
