= Tú Me Dejaste De Querer =

Single by C. Tangana featuring Niño de Elche and La Húngara

from the album El Madrileño
- Language: Spanish
- English title: "You Stopped Loving Me"
- Released: 5 November 2020
- Genre: Latin pop · reggaeton · new flamenco
- Length: 3:18
- Label: Sony
- Songwriters: Antón Álvarez Alfaro; Juan Antonio Jiménez Muñoz; Cristian Quirante Catalán; Javier Rodríguez de Antonio
- Producer: Alizzz

C. Tangana singles chronology
| "Demasiadas Mujeres" (2020) | "Tú Me Dejaste De Querer" (2020) | "Comerte Entera" (2021) |

La Húngara singles chronology
| "El Niño Manuel" (2020) | "Tú Me Dejaste De Querer" (2020) | "Locamente" (2021) |

Niño de Elche singles chronology
| "Mera Vuelta" (2020) | "Tú Me Dejaste De Querer" (2020) | "Flores Muertas" (2021) |

"Tú me dejaste de querer" ("You stopped loving me" in English) a song recorded by Spanish singer and rapper C. Tangana from his second studio album El Madrileño (2021). The track features singers La Húngara and Niño de Elche and was written by the singer himself, along with Juan Antonio Jiménez Muñoz, Cristian Quirante Catalán and Javier Rodríguez de Antonio. It was produced by Alizzz. It was released on 5 November 2020 through Sony Music as the album's third single.

== Release ==
The song served as the third single for El Madrileño, the second studio album by C. Tangana and was released after the first single "Nunca Estoy", released on 28 April 2020 and the second, "Demasiadas Mujeres", released on 8 October 2020. The song became the most streamed song in 24 hours on Spotify Spain, achieving 1.631.995 streams on the first day, breaking the record previously held by Aitana with her song "Vas a Quedarte".

== Music video ==
The music video was released on 5 November 2020, it was directed by Santos Bacana and produced by María Rubio and Cristina Trenas from the collective Little Spain. The video shows C. Tangana in a hotel roof in Madrid surrounded by luxury but dissatisfied and later in an airplane remembering a woman. Upon release, the video went number one on trending on YouTube, reaching over six million views after three days.

== Charts ==
| Chart (2018) | Peak position |
|---|---|
| Argentina Hot 100 (Billboard) | 94 |
| Global 200 (Billboard) | 83 |
| Spain (Promusicae) | 1 |

== Certifications ==
| Region | Certification | Certified units/sales |
|---|---|---|
| Mexico (AMPROFON) | Platinum+Gold | 210,000^{‡} |
| Spain (Promusicae) | 10× Platinum | 600,000^{‡} |
| United States (RIAA) | Platinum (Latin) | 60,000^{‡} |
Streaming
| Central America (CFC) | Gold | 3,500,000^{†} |
^{‡} Sales+streaming figures based on certification alone.^{†} Streaming-only figures based on certification alone.
