= El Barrio (singer) =

Spanish singer-songwriter and poet

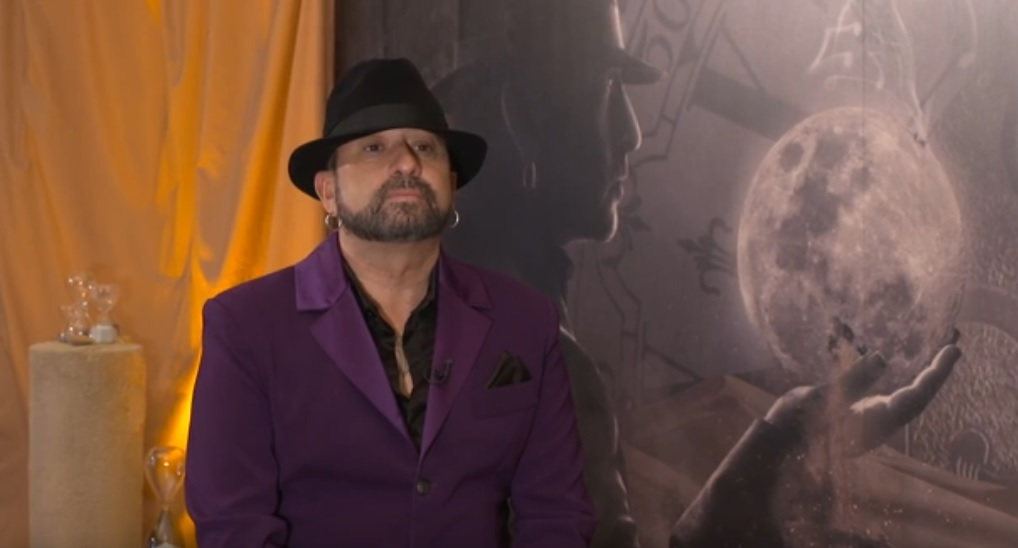
- Image of El Barrio, cantante

Background information
- Origin: Cádiz, Andalucía, Spain
- Genres: New Flamenco, Flamenco
- Members: José Luis Figuereo

José Luis Figuereo Franco, better known by the stage name El Barrio, is a Spanish new flamenco singer. He was born on 4 June 1970 in Cádiz, Santa María.

Figuereo is known as a multi-artist from Andalucía. He is not only a singer-songwriter, but is also a composer and a poet. In his music, he uses old and new flamenco techniques.

His poetic style offers a fresh take on flamenco. The lyrics of his songs define an urban flamenco, with conceptual and emotional subjects. His language is lyrical, youthful, and modern, employing slang and even gypsy expressions into his work.

This poetic style is reminiscent of the great Spanish flamenco singers. He has first-class use of his throat when singing.

His poetry is evocative of the poetry from the Generation of '27, from the surrealism of Alberti, to the more gypsy Federico García Lorca and the passionate Miguel Hernández.

== Discography ==
- 1996 – Yo Sueño Flamenco
- 1998 – Mi Secreto
- 1999 – Mal de Amores
- 2000 – La Fuente del Deseo
- 2002 – Me Voy Al Mundo
- 2003 – Angel Malherido
- 2005 – Las Playas de Invierno
- 2006 – Toda una Década
- 2007 – La Voz de Mi Silencio
- 2009 – Duermevela
- 2010 – Al sur de la Atlántida
- 2011 – Espejos
- 2012 – Hasta el fin de los tiempo
- 2014 – Hijo del Levante
- 2017 – Las costuras del alma
- 2019 – El Danzar de las Mariposas
- 2022 – Atemporal
- 2026 – Relicario
