= Premios Odeón =

- Current: 2nd Annual Premios Odeón
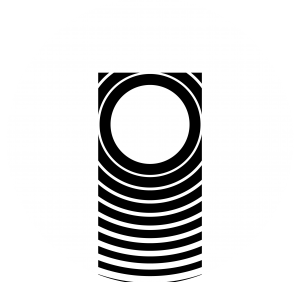
- Awarded for: Outstanding achievements in the Spanish record industry market
- Country: Spain
- Presented by: AGEDI
- First award: January 20, 2020; 6 years ago
- Website: premiosodeon.com

Television/radio coverage
- Network: La 1 (2020); Twitch (2022)

The Premios Odeón (or Odeon Awards in its English interpretation) are a series of awards presented annually by the Asociación de Gestión de Derechos Intelectuales (AGEDI) in collaboration with Productores de Música de España (PROMUSICAE), Sociedad General de Autores y Editores (SGAE), Fundación Autor and Sociedad de Artistas de España (AIE) to recognize the best of Spanish music and to award the talent of Spanish artists in a diversity of genres and categories. Due to the implication of this associations, Premios Odeón are considered the Spanish equivalent to the Grammy Awards. The annual presentation ceremony features performances by prominent artists, and the presentation of awards that have more popular interest. The Premios Odeón are considered the successors to the Premios Amigo and the Premios de la Música, which were canceled in 2007 and 2012 respectively.

== History ==
The Spanish financial crisis led to the lack of interest and investment in the country's music industry as the musical panorama also seemed blurry and quite disappointing. In 2007, the Premios Amigo, which and were presented by the Asociación Fonográfica y Videográfica Española, held its last ceremony after being absent since 2003 due to an intern crisis within the Spanish music industry from 2004 to 2006. In 2012, the last ceremony of the Premios a la Música was held in Madrid. Its cancelation was motived the same as its counterpart's.

In December 2019, taking advantage of the bright future of the Spanish music industry due to the adaptation of streaming services, a rise in urban music and a new tidal wave of artists and musicians, the Spanish Intellectual Rights Management Association (AGEDI) formed by the main record companies in the country, announced the creation of a new award ceremony. The choice of the new name is given by the origin of the music, since Odeon was the name that the Greeks gave to the temple in which musical shows were performed. And because Odeon was also the name of the mythical record company that released the first double-sided slate records. In this new version of the awards, the winners are chosen in addition to their successes on the list, along with the votes of the public.

== Categories ==
The different awards are divided into two parts, the Odeón Awards and the Premios Objetivo, the first are chosen from a cross between the public's votes on the web and the criteria of the organizing committee, the targets are chosen by each listening, each viewing, and each album purchased until the day of the gala.

Due to its short run, the Premios Odeón are still stabilizing its categories. In 2020, the categories were general, including Best Album, Best Song and Best Music Video. There was also a space for Latin American acts with the Best Latin Artist award. There also exited a gender distinction for the Best Spanish Artist award. Nevertheless, in its second edition, the categories were expanded up to twenty categories, making a difference between music genres and having a "Best Album", "Best Artist" and "Best New Artist" category for each genre, eliminating all general categories except for the Best Music Video one. There was also a place reserved for international acts in the Best International Artist category.

In addition to these categories, in each edition an Honor Award will be awarded, with which "the industry will annually recognize the career of an artist whose career has marked a milestone in Spanish musical history."

== Ceremonies ==
Listed below is a table showing Odeon Awards ceremonies.

Ceremony	Year	Venue	City	CCAA	Host	Honor Award	Emission	Ref.
1st Annual Premios Odeón	January 20, 2020	Teatro Real	Madrid	Community of Madrid	Quequé	José Luís Perales	La 1	
2nd Annual Premios Odeón	March 10, 2021	Held virtually due to a new peak of COVID-19 cases			—N/a	Raphael	—N/a	
3rd Annual Premios Odeón	March 15, 2022	Palacio de la Prensa	Madrid	Community of Madrid	Cristinini	Joan Manuel Serrat	Twitch	
4th Annual Premios Odeón	April 27, 2023	No ceremony held; awards were personally handed to winners			—N/a	Not awarded	—N/a	
