= Camela =

Spanish musical group

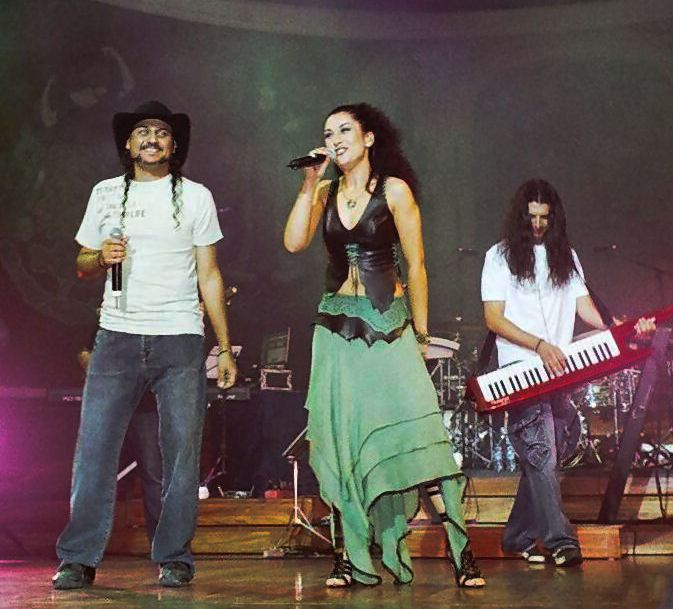

Background information
- Origin: Spain
- Genres: Tecno-rumba, Techno, pop, flamenco
- Years active: 1994–present
- Labels: EMI
- Members: María Ángeles Muñoz Dueñas (20 August 1974); Dionisio Martín Lobato (31 October 1970); Miguel Ángel Cabrera Jiménez (25 January 1972)
- Website: www.camela.es

Camela is a Spanish musical group credited with being the pioneers of the style baptised as tecno-rumba in the 90s. Its members are Dionisio Martin Lobato (singer-composer), María de los Ángeles Muñoz Dueñas (singer-songwriter), and until February 2013, Miguel Angel Jimenez Cabrera (keyboards), all of them from the Madrid neighbourhood of San Cristóbal de los Ángeles. The group is a landmark in the Spanish popular music scene, without critics' acceptance, and hardly any support from the media, they became a massive selling success, having a great musical and sociological impact on Spanish society. Camela is the second best selling band in Spain in the past 20 years, only surpassed by La Oreja de Van Gogh.

In 1994, the group released their debut album Lágrimas de amor in Spain on CD and cassette. It was the most successful of the group's career, even though it failed to enter charts. All songs were written by Miguel Ángel Cabrera and recorded in the winter of 1993 to 1994 under the direction of Daniel Muneta. The first single was "Lágrimas de amor".

In 2024, the group was awarded the Gold Medal of Merit in the Fine Arts.

== Discography ==
Studio albums

- 1994: Lágrimas de amor
- 1995: Sueños inalcanzables
- 1996: Sus 12 primeras canciones
- 1997: Corazón indomable
- 1998: Sólo por ti
- 1999: No puedo estar sin él
- 2000: Simplemente amor
- 2001: Amor.com
- 2003: Por siempre tú y yo
- 2004: Diez de corazón
- 2006: Se ciega x amor
- 2007: Te prometo el universo
- 2008: Laberinto de amor
- 2009: Dioni, Ángeles y Miguel
- 2011: La magia del amor
- 2014: Más de lo que piensas
- 2017: Me metí en tu corazón
- 2022: Que la música te acompañe
