= La Húngara =

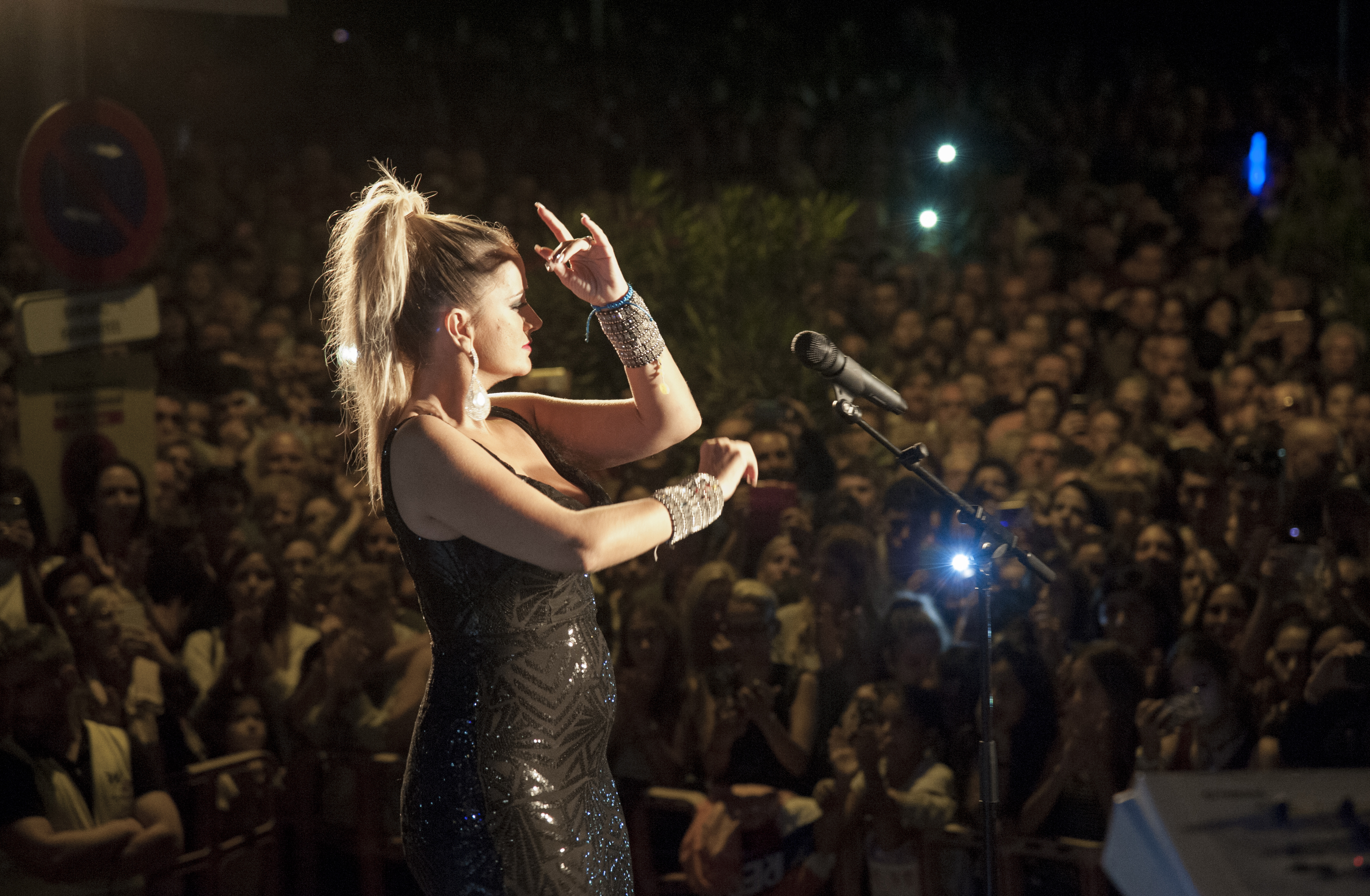
- Performing in Esplugues de Llobregat in 2017

Background information
- Birth name: Sonia María Priego Bárbara
- Also known as: La Húngara
- Born: 21 January 1980 (age 45); Écija, Spain
- Genres: Flamenco; Flamenco pop
- Occupation: Singer
- Instrument: Vocals
- Years active: 2001–present

Sonia María Priego Bárbara (born 21 January 1980), best known as La Húngara, is a Spanish flamenco singer.

== Early life ==
Sonia María Priego Bárbara was born on 21 January 1980 in Écija, province of Seville. She has been known as La Húngara since she was very young. She had her first child at age 15.

== Career ==
Her musical career began after she was discovered by El Kaly in 2001 when she was performing Rocío Jurado's "Ese hombre" in a karaoke bar. She released her first album in 2001, A Camarón, after which she continued releasing albums on a year-by-year basis. She earned her first gold record with her fifth album Dibujando esperanzas (2006). Her first recorded music video was "Vete de mi vera".

She collaborated with C. Tangana and El Niño de Elche in the single "Tú Me Dejaste De Querer", released in 2020. As of 2021, she has released 19 records.
