= El Madrileño =

Studio album by C. Tangana
- Released: February 26, 2021; February 18, 2022 (La Sobremesa)
- Recorded: 2020
- Genre: Folk; alternative R&B
- Length: 42:31
- Language: Spanish
- Label: Sony Spain
- Producer: C. Tangana; Víctor Martínez; Alizzz; Nineteen85; Niño De Elche; Raül Refree; Federico Vindver; Rafael Arcaute

C. Tangana chronology
Bien (2020)	El Madrileño (2021)

Singles from El Madrileño
- 1. "Demasiadas Mujeres" Released: October 8, 2020; 2. "Tú Me Dejaste De Querer" Released: November 5, 2020; 3. "Comerte Entera" Released: January 15, 2021; 4. "Nominao" Released: February 26, 2021

Singles from La Sobremesa
- 1. "Yate" Released: August 13, 2021; 2. "Ateo" Released: October 8, 2021; 3. "La Culpa" Released: February 18, 2022

El Madrileño (English: The Madrilenian) is the second studio album by Spanish rapper and singer-songwriter C. Tangana. Written by Tangana and co-produced with Alizzz, the album was released through Sony Music on February 26, 2021. With this record, Tangana ventured into a more organic and guitar oriented sound to his previous hip hop and urban releases, focusing in a collaboration album as a tribute to his wide roots. Twelve out of fourteen tracks are in collaboration with other renowned Latin folk, rock or flamenco artists from many countries and ages. The result is a colored mosaic of Tangana's teenage influences and the adoption of a new alter ego named after the album.

The record became a commercial success, debuting atop the Spanish Charts and peaking at eight on the US Billboard Top Latin Albums chart. It was the best selling album in Spain of 2021. Promotion prior to its release encompassed the release of three singles: "Demasiadas Mujeres", "Tú Me Dejaste de Querer"—both accompanied by music videos produced by Little Spain—and "Comerte Entera". The lead single topped the charts in Spain as the third one reached the top ten. "Tú Me Dejaste de Querer" quickly managed to become Tangana's best performing single, debuting at number one in Spain and entering the charts in Argentina and the Billboard Global 200. Despite not receiving radio promotion, "Ingobernable", featuring the Gipsy Kings, debuted at number one on the PROMUSICAE weekly list. A reissue, La Sobremesa, featuring late singles like "Ateo" as well as the recording of Tangana's NPR Tiny Desk concert, was released on February 18, 2022.

With El Madrileño, C. Tangana scored his first Latin Grammy nominations as a performer. He had previously received four awards for his contributions as a co-writer on El Mal Querer, the sophomore album by Rosalía, and for her song "Malamente", which he also co-wrote. El Madrileño was nominated for Album of the Year and won Best Engineered Album while the Omar Apollo duet "Te Olvidaste" was nominated for Record of the Year and Best Alternative Song. "Nominao", featuring Jorge Drexler, won the latter category while "Hong Kong", featuring Andrés Calamaro, was awarded Best Pop/Rock Song. Longtime friend and musical collaborator of Tangana, Alizzz, scored a Producer of the Year nomination. El Madrileño was included on Rolling Stone's "The 250 Greatest Albums of the 21st Century so far" list.

== Background ==
On April 24, 2020, C. Tangana released the song "Nunca Estoy", which was well received by critics and acclaimed for moving beyond the trap and hip hop sounds that he had become known for. The song reached the top spot on the PROMUSICAE chart, becoming Tangana's first number one hit in his career. It was followed by the release of his first extended play as a signed artist, Bien:(, the month after. In September, Tangana revealed to Forbes that his third studio album would be very different from his previous releases and that it would be called El Madrileño, in reference to his hometown Madrid and to the new alter ego he adopted during the making of this new project.

In late January 2021, the singer began to tease the release of the album through social media. On January 23, he revealed the cover art and, three days later, the tracklist and release date.

== Recording ==
Shortly after announcing the album's release date, Tangana offered an interview with El País where he stated that "If it had not been for the pandemic, I would have started to record El Madrileño by the end of 2021. I had a recorded album of urbano music, a lot of rap, overcoming trap. When the pandemic began and I began to scratch, it seemed to me that I was not up to the times. This one is".

== Promotion ==
On October 8, Tangana released the lead single of El Madrileño. "Demasiadas Mujeres" became an instant hit in Spain, debuting at the top of the PROMUSICAE chart and being gold-certified in only a week for selling over 20,000 copies. The song was, in fact, very different out of all the other things on the singer's repertoire and included a Holy Week marching band from Cádiz. The song included a message of frustration and elements of folk. Its respected music video included a scene of Tangana's own funeral as well as references to his past relationships with Rosalía and Berta Vázquez. On November 6, Tangana released featuring Niño de Elche and La Húngara "the most important song of his career", which he named "Tú Me Dejaste de Querer". He defined the track as a combination of rumba and bachata with elements of flamenco music. Its teaser reached over two million views on Twitter and another million and a half on Instagram. The track broke the record for the most-streamed song in Spain in a 24-hour period with 1,6 million national streams. As for international numbers, "Tú Me Dejaste de Querer" debuted at 31 on the Spotify Global chart, marking the first entry of Tangana on the list. The track also peaked at number one in Spain and was directly certified Gold after one week. The track was promoted at LOS40 Music Awards 2020. In January, a third single "Comerte Entera", in collaboration with Brazilian singer and guitarist Toquinho, was released to critical acclaim.

In September 2021, a clothing collection in collaboration with Bershka, inspired in the album, was released.

== Critical reception ==
Professional ratings
Review scores
Source	Rating
MondoSonoro	9/10
AllMusic	4.5/5 stars

== Tour ==
A concert tour in support of El Madrileño, Sin Cantar ni Afinar Tour, was announced on November 14, 2021, consisting of fifteen initial dates. It began on February 19, 2022 in Málaga. Tickets went on sale on November 16 to overwhelming demand. On July 11, 2022 additional dates were announced for the "Sin Cantar ni Afinar LATAM Tour 22", a series of additional concerts to take place in Mexico, Colombia and Argentina.

=== Dates ===
List of concerts, showing date, city, country and venue.
Date	City	Country	Venue
Europe
February 19, 2022	Málaga	Spain	Palacio de los Deportes
February 26, 2022	A Coruña	Spain	Coliseum
March 5, 2022	Madrid	Spain	WiZink Center
Latin America
March 20, 2022 (Note: The concert on March 20, 2022 in Mexico City was part of Vive Latino.)	Mexico City	Mexico	Foro Sol
March 23, 2022 (Note: The concert on March 23, 2022 in Santiago was part of Fauna Otoño.)	Santiago	Chile	Movistar Arena
March 26, 2022 (Note: The concert on March 26, 2022 in Bogotá was part of Estéreo Pícnic.)	Bogotá	Colombia	Briceño 18
April 1, 2022 (Note: The concert on April 1, 2022 in Monterrey was part of Pal Norte.)	Monterrey	Mexico	Parque Fundidora
April 2, 2022 (Note: The concert on April 2, 2022 in Mexico City was part of Ceremonia.)	Mexico City	Mexico	Parque Bicentenario
Europe
April 9, 2022	Bilbao	Spain	Bizkaia Arena
April 23, 2022	Barcelona	Spain	Palau Sant Jordi
April 29, 2022	Zaragoza	Spain	Pabellón Príncipe Felipe
May 28, 2022	Alicante	Spain	Multiespacio Rabasa
June 5, 2022 (Note: The concert on June 5, 2022 in Paris was part of We Love Green.)	Paris	France	Bois de Vincennes
June 11, 2022	Marbella	Spain	Cantera de Nagüeles
June 16, 2022 (Note: The concert on June 16, 2022 in Santiago de Compostela was part of O Son Do Camiño.)	Santiago	Spain	Monte do Gozo
June 17, 2022 (Note: The concert on June 17, 2022 in Barcelona is part of Sónar.)	Barcelona	Spain	Fira de Montjuïc
June 24, 2022 (Note: The concert on June 24, 2022 in Calvià is part of Mallorca Live.)	Calvià	Spain	Antiguo Aquapark
July 1, 2022 (Note: The concert on July 1, 2022 in Madrid is part of Río Babel.)	Madrid	Spain	Caja Mágica
July 8, 2022	Las Palmas	Spain	Gran Canaria Arena
July 9, 2022 (Note: The concert on July 9, 2022 in Valencia is part of Big Sound Festival.)	Valencia	Spain	Ciutat de les Arts i les Ciències
July 12, 2022	Marbella	Spain	Cantera de Nagüeles
July 15, 2022	Lisbon	Portugal	Parque das Nações
July 16, 2022	Castro Urdiales	Spain	Estadio Riomar
July 22, 2022	Llanera	Spain	Recinto Ferial
July 23, 2022	Hoyos del Espino	Spain	Músicos en la Naturaleza
July 30, 2022	San Fernando	Spain	Bahía Sur
August 1, 2022	Marbella	Spain	Cantera de Nagüeles
August 6, 2022 (Note: The concert on August 4, 2022 in Burriana is part of Arenal Sound.)	Burriana	Spain	Playa de Burriana
August 13, 2022 (Note: The concert on August 10, 2022 in Aranda de Duero is part of Sonorama Ribera.)	Aranda de Duero	Spain	Recinto Ferial
August 18, 2022	Benidorm	Spain	Estadio Guillermo Amor
August 23, 2022	Vigo	Spain	Muelle Transatlánticos
September 3, 2022	Pamplona	Spain	Navarra Arena
September 17, 2022	Seville	Spain	Plaza de España
Latin America
November 10, 2022	Monterrey	Mexico	Auditorio Citibanamex
November 12, 2022	Guadalajara	Mexico	Arena VFG
November 15, 2022	Mexico City	Mexico	Palacio de los Deportes
November 16, 2022	Mexico City	Mexico	Palacio de los Deportes
November 19, 2022	Bogotá	Colombia	Movistar Arena
November 22, 2022	Buenos Aires	Argentina	Movistar Arena
November 23, 2022	Buenos Aires	Argentina	Movistar Arena
November 29, 2022	Santiago	Chile	Movistar Arena

==== Canceled shows ====
Date	City	Country	Venue	Reason(s)
March 12, 2022 (Note: The concert on March 12, 2022 in Santo Domingo was part of Isle of Light)	Santo Domingo	Dominican Republic	Isle of Light	Heavy rain
March 18, 2022 (Note: The concert on March 18, 2022 in Buenos Aires was part of Lollapalooza.)	Buenos Aires	Argentina	Hipódromo de San Isidro	Logistic transport-related problems
June 2, 2022 (Note: The concert on June 2, 2022 in Barcelona was part of Primavera Sound.)	Barcelona	Spain	Parc del Fòrum	Unknown
June 9, 2022 (Note: The concert on June 9, 2022 in Barcelona was part of Primavera Sound.)	Barcelona	Spain	Parc del Fòrum	Unknown
September 3, 2022	London	United Kingdom	O_{2} Shepherd's Bush Empire	Production issues

== Track listing ==
All tracks are produced by C. Tangana, Alizzz and Victor Martínez, except where noted.

No.	Title	Writer(s)	Producer(s)	Length
1.	"Demasiadas Mujeres"	Cristian Quirante Catalán; Antón Álvarez Alfaro; Camilo Murillo; Francisco Naranjo; Genaro Monreal; Sergio Larrinaga	C. Tangana; Alizzz	2:33
2.	"Tú Me Dejaste De Querer" (with Niño de Elche and La Húngara)	Quirante Catalán; Álvarez; Harto Rodríguez; Juan António Jiménez Muñoz	C. Tangana; Alizzz	3:18
3.	"Comerte Entera" (with Toquinho)	Quirante Catalán; Álvarez; Daniele Alves Dos Santos; Victor Martínez		2:54
4.	"Nunca Estoy"	Quirante; Álvarez; Alejandro Sanz; Paul Jefferies; Rosario González Flores	C. Tangana; Alizzz; Nineteen85	2:42
5.	"Párteme la Cara" (with Ed Maverick)	Quirante Catalán; Álvarez; Eduardo Hernández Saucedo; Victor Martínez		2:47
6.	"Ingobernable" (with Gipsy Kings)	Álvarez; Martínez; Quirante Catalán		3:07
7.	"Nominao" (with Jorge Drexler)	Álvarez; Martínez; Quirante Catalán; Jorge Drexler	C. Tangana; Alizzz	2:56
8.	"Un Veneno (G Mix)" (with José Feliciano and Niño de Elche)	Álvarez; José Feliciano; Niño de Elche; Martínez; Alvaro Santos Martín	C. Tangana; Niño de Elche; Martínez; Alizzz; Raül Refree	3:13
9.	"Te Olvidaste" (with Omar Apollo)	Álvarez; Federico Vindver; Omar Apollo; Rafael Arcaute	Vindver; Arcaute	3:07
10.	"Muriendo de Envidia" (with Eliades Ochoa)	Quirante Catalán; Álvarez; Eliades Ochoa; José Fernández Salvador; Martínez		3:02
11.	"Cambia!" (with Carín León and Adriel Favela)	Quirante Catalán; Álvarez; Martínez; Adriel Favela; Carín León		3:08
12.	"Cuándo Olvidaré" (with Pepe Blanco)	Quirante Catalán; Álvarez; Martínez; Tiara Thomas; Steve Arrington; Charles Carter; Elijah Dias; Gabriella Wilson; Jermaine Dupri; Roger Parker; Ron Latour; Shawn Carter; Waung Hankerson; Farruquito; Juan Fernández; Juan Carlos Cobián; Negro Cherokee; Greg Carmona; Enrique Cadícamo; Buddy Hankerson; Antonio Humanes		3:09
13.	"Los Tontos" (with Kiko Veneno)	Quirante Catalán; Álvarez; Martínez; Kiko Veneno		3:12
14.	"Hong Kong" (with Andrés Calamaro)	Quirante Catalán; Álvarez; Martínez; Drexler; Andrés Calamaro		3:23
Total length:				42:31

La Sobremesa – 2022 re-release
No.	Title	Writer(s)	Producer(s)	Length
15.	"La Culpa" (with Omar Montes and Daviles de Novelda featuring Canelita)	Álvarez; Quirante; Moncho Chavea; Omar Montes; Martínez		3:08
16.	"Ateo" (with Nathy Peluso)	Álvarez; Quirante; Natalia Peluso; Martínez	C. Tangana; Martínez; Alizzz; Rafa Arcaute	4:00
17.	"Yate"	Álvarez; Quirante; Delfín Amaya; José Amaya; Martínez		3:25
18.	"Bobo" (with Luís Segura)	Álvarez; Quirante; Martínez
19.	"Te Venero"	Álvarez; Quirante; Roberto Fonseca; Martínez	C. Tangana; Alizzz; Fonseca; Martínez
20.	"Me Maten" (Live at NPR's Tiny Desk (with Antonio Carmona))	Álvarez; Antonio Carmona; Quirante; Martínez	C. Tangana; Martínez	4:02
21.	"Los Tontos" (Live at NPR's Tiny Desk (with Kiko Veneno))	Quirante Catalán; Álvarez; Martínez; Kiko Veneno; Gillian Gilbert; Peter Hook; Stephen Morris; Bernard Sumner		4:11
22.	"Un Veneno" (with Niño de Elche)	Álvarez; Niño de Elche; Alvaro Santos Martín		3:13
23.	"Para Repartir"	Álvarez; Alizzz; Quirante Catalán		2:58
Total length:				73:50

Notes

- "Cambia!" is stylized in all caps.

Sample credits

- "Demasiadas Mujeres" contains a sample of "El Amor" by La Banda Rosario De Cadiz; and a sample of "Campanera" by Joselito.
- "Tú Me Dejaste de Querer" contains an interpolation of "Son Ilusiones" by Los Chichos
- "Comerte Entera" contains a sample of "Daniele Puxa O Bonde" by DJ Wagner and MC Daniele.
- "Nunca Estoy" contains an interpolation of "Como Quieres que Te Quiera" by Rosario; and an interpolation of "Corazón Partío" by Alejandro Sanz.
- "Muriendo de Envidia" contains an interpolation of "Lola" written by Fernández Salvador and performed by El Pescaílla
- "Cuándo Olvidaré" contains an excerpt of Pepe Blanco on Cantares; a sample of "Slide" by H.E.R. featuring YG; an interpolation of Pasan los Días by La Tana; and an interpolation of Nostalgia by Enrique Cadícamo.
- "Hong Kong" contains a lyrical excerpt of "Mil Horas" by Los Abuelos de la Nada
- "Yate" contains an interpolation of "Vete" by Los Amaya
- "Los Tontos (Live at NPR's Tiny Desk)" contains an interpolation of Bizarre Love Triangle by New Order

== Charts ==
=== Weekly charts ===
Weekly chart performance for El Madrileño
Chart (2021–2022)	Peak position
Portuguese Albums (AFP)	47
Spanish Albums (PROMUSICAE)	1
US Top Latin Albums (Billboard)	8

=== Year-end charts ===
Year-end chart performance for El Madrileño
Chart (2021)	Position
Spanish Albums (PROMUSICAE)	1
Chart (2022)	Position
Spanish Albums (PROMUSICAE)	3
Chart (2023)	Position
Spanish Albums (PROMUSICAE)	6

== Certifications ==
Certifications for El Madrileño
Region	Certification	Certified units/sales
Mexico (AMPROFON)	Platinum	140,000^{‡}
Spain (PROMUSICAE)	5× Platinum	200,000^{‡}
^{‡} Sales+streaming figures based on certification alone.

== Release history ==
Country	Date	Format	Label
Various	February 26, 2021	Digital download; streaming	Sony Spain
Spain	April 16, 2021	Vinyl	Sony Spain

== See also ==
- 2021 in European music
- 2021 in Latin music
