= Alizzz =

Spanish singer and rapper (born 1984)

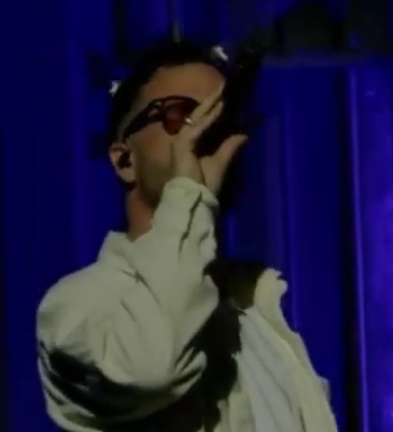
- Catalán performing in 2022

Background information
- Born: Cristian Quirante Catalán; 1984 (age 41–42); Castelldefels, Catalonia, Spain
- Genres: R&B; pop; rap; electronica
- Occupations: Record producer; songwriter; singer
- Years active: 2012–present
- Labels: Mad Decent; Warner; Whoa!
- Website: alizzzmusic.com

Cristian Quirante Catalán (born 1984), better known by his stage name Alizzz, is a Spanish record producer, songwriter, and singer from Castelldefels, Catalunya. To date he has been awarded a total of 2 diamond, 35 platinum, and 6 gold certified for recordings produced in Spain and Internationally for his production work. In 2021 the Latin Grammy Awards nominated Alizzz for 6 awards including for Producer of the Year. and awarded him 3 Latin Grammy Awards including Latin Grammy Award for Best Pop/Rock Song, "Hong Kong" by C. Tangana, featuring Andres Calamaro, Best Alternative Song for "Nominao", by C. Tangana featuring Jorge Drexler, and the Latin Grammy Award for Best Engineered Album.

== History ==
Alizzz's career started in 2012 with the release of the single "Neon Lights", released via the UK label MofoHifi. Following his Whoa! EP, for Spanish label Arkestra, at the end of 2013 he signed to Diplo's Mad Decent, through which he released the Sunshine EP, and shortly after began touring internationally. In 2015, he released the single "Your Love" on digital label Moving Castle, from the USA. In June 2018, Alizzz headlined Sónar festival's 25th anniversary edition.

In 2020, Alizzz launched a new solo artistic project, showcasing his singing and interpretation alongside his writing and producing, to date he has released songs featuring Spanish singer Amaia (singer). and long term music partner C. Tangana. His debut album "Tiene que haber algo más" was released on his own label through a distribution deal with Warner Music Spain.

== Collaborations ==
Alizzz's first production work was in 2016, with C. Tangana and Rosalia, with whom he wrote and produced the singles "Antes de Morirme" and "Llámame más tarde". He continued to work with C. Tangana, eventually producing his debut album, ÍDOLO, which was produced and recorded between September 2016 and June 2017. In June 2017, the C. Tangana song, produced by Alizzz, "Mala Mujer" was released, and went on to be awarded triple platinum in Spain. The track "Tú Me Dejaste De Querer", performed by C. Tangana, Niño de Elche and La Húngara, produced by Alizzz, became the first Spanish release to receive a Gold Certification in its first week of release.

In February 2021 C.Tangana released his second album El Madrileño, again produced by Alizzz. For the week of its release the album was the most streamed album in Spain and globally on Spotify.

== Whoa! Music ==
In January 2019, Alizzz launched Whoa! Music, a record label, in partnership with Warner Records Spain. The concept of the label is to develop and release Spanish and Latin American artists from the "new pop" scene. Artists signed to the label include Alizzz, Paula Cendejas, Coral Casino and Robie.

== Discography ==
Title	Year	Album / EP	Label
Neon Lights	2012	Neon Lights	MofoHifi Records
Loud	2012	Loud EP	MofoHifi Records
Cruel	2012	Loud EP	MofoHifi Records
Tactel	2012	Loud EP	MofoHifi Records
Loud – The Young Punx Mix	2012	Loud EP	MofoHifi Records
Whoa!	2013	Whoa! EP	Arkestra Discos
Champagne – Featuring Congo Lacosta	2013	Whoa! EP	Arkestra Discos
In Chains	2013	Whoa! EP	Arkestra Discos
Turquoise	2013	Whoa! EP	Arkestra Discos
Collapse – Featuring Dreamon	2014	Collapse	MofoHifi Records
Sunshine	2014	Sunshine EP	Mad Decent
I C U	2014	Sunshine EP	Mad Decent
That Gurl	2014	Sunshine EP	Mad Decent
What IF	2014	Sunshine EP	Mad Decent
Your Love Featuring Max Marshall	2015	Your Love EP	Moving Castle Records
Basic Complexity	2015	Your Love EP	Moving Castle Records
Body Slam Featuring Santell	2016	Ocean Drive EP	Tape Music
Better Than You Featuring Santell and Iyeball	2016	Ocean Drive EP	Tape Music
2 Languages Featuring Iyeball	2016	Ocean Drive EP	Tape Music
Pull Up on Me Featuring Yas	2017	Ascension EP	Moving Castle Records
Knock Them Out Featuring Max Marshall	2017	Ascension EP	Moving Castle Records
Shout Out Featuring Sakima	2017	Ascension EP	Moving Castle Records
Tu Cama Feat Jesse Baez y Paula Cendejas	2019	Tu Cama Single	Whoa Music / Warner Music Spain
Otro Lugar Feat Paula Cendejas	2019	Otro Lugar Single	Whoa Music / Warner Music Spain
Body Feat St. Pedro	2019	Body Single	Whoa Music / Warner Music Spain
Numero 10 Feat MC Bin Laden y MC Buzzz	2019	Numero 10 single	Whoa Music / Warner Music Spain
Desclasificados EP	2020	Desclasificados EP	Whoa Music
Todo me sabe a poco	2020	Todo me sabe a poco	Whoa Music
El Encuentro feat. Amaia	2020	El Encuentro Single	Whoa Music
Ya No Siento Nada	2021	Ya No Siento Nada	Whoa Music / Warner Music Spain
Salir	2021	Salir Single	Whoa Music / Warner Music Spain
Ya No Vales	2021	Ya No Vales Single	Warner Music Spain
Disimulao	2021	Disimulao Single	Whoa Music / Warner Music Spain
Tiene que haber algo más	2021	Tiene que haber algo más ALBUM	Whoa Music / Warner Music Spain

== Production credits ==
ALBUMS

- Amaia - Cuando No Sé Quién Soy (album) Universal Music (2022)
- C. Tangana - El Madrileño (album) Sony Records (2021)
- C. Tangana – Ídolo (album) Sony Records (2017)

EP's

- Angela Torres - La Niña De Fuego / Warner Music Argentina S.A (2021)
- C. Tangana – Bien :-( Sony Records (2020)

SINGLES

- Amaia - Quiero Pero No (featuring Rojuu) / Universal Music Spain (2021)
- C. Tangana - Ateo feat. Nathy Peluso / Sony Music Spain (2021)
- Amaia - Yo Invito / Universal Music Spain (2021)
- Natti Natasha - Arrebatá / Sony Music Entertainment US Latin (2021)
- C. Tangana - Yate / Sony Music Spain (2021)
- Ms Nina - Si Quieres / Universal Music Spain (2021)
- Princesa Alba - Lo Siento Quemasucabeza (2021)
- Sen Senra - Qué Facilidad / Universal Music Spain (2021)
- C. Tangana - Párteme La Cara feat Ed Maverick / Sony Music Spain (2021)
- C. Tangana - Los Tontos feat Andrés Calamaro / Sony Music Spain (2021)
- C. Tangana - Nominao feat Jorge Drexler / Sony Music Spain (2021)
- C. Tangana - Comerte Entera / Sony Music Spain (2021)
- Paula Cendejas - El Pacto / Warner Music Spain (2021)
- Princesa Alba - Dame / Whoa Music (2020)
- C. Tangana - Tú Me Dejaste De Querer ft. Niño de Elche & La Húngara / Sony Music Spain (2020)
- Angela Torres - Flotando / Warner Music Argentina S.A (2020)
- C. Tangana - Demasiadas Mujeres / Sony Music Spain (2020)
- C. Tangana - Ojalá / Sony Music Spain (2020)
- Angela Torres - Guapo / Warner Music Argentina S.A (2020)
- Paula Cendejas feat. C. Tangana - Como habla una mujer / Warner Music Spain (2020)
- Angela Torres - Allo / Warner Music Argentina S.A (2020)
- Lola Indigo - Mala Cara / Universal Music Spain (2020)
- C. Tangana - Yelo / Sony Music Spain (2020)
- C. Tangana - Guille Asesino / Sony Music Spain (2020)
- C. Tangana - Nunca Estoy / Sony Music Spain (2020)
- Robie - Búscame Whoa! Music / Warner Music Spain (2020)
- St. Pedro - Phone Sex / Interscope Records (2020)
- Paula Cendejas - Gotitas al Viento feat. Feid / Warner Music Spain (2020)
- Rels B Featuring Nathy Peluso - No Se Perdona / Sony Music Spain (2020)
- Princesa Alba - Me Equivoqué / self release (2020)
- C. Tangana - Yelo / Sony Music Spain (2020)
- Princesa Alba - Mi Culpa / self release (2020)
- C. Tangana, Darrell - Pronto Llegará / Sony Music Spain (2019)
- C. Tangana, Duki, Polima Westcoast, Neo Pista - 5stars / Sony Music Spain (2019)
- C. Tangana, Darrell - Pronto Llegará / Sony Music Spain (2019)
- Paula Cendejas - Olvidate / Warner Music Spain (2019)
- C. Tangana featuring Paloma Mami - No te debi besar / Sony Music Spain (2019)
- Piso 21 featuring Christian Nodal - Pa' Olvidarme De Ella / Warner Music Mexico (2019)
- Cupido featuring Lola Indigo y Alizzz - Autoestima - Remix / Primavera Labels / Universal Music Spain (2019)
- Paula Cendejas featuring Mario Bautista - 10 Minutos / Warner Music Spain (2019)
- Robie - Solo a ti / Whoa! Music / Warner Music Spain (2019)
- Robie - ¿Qué Será? / Whoa! Music / Warner Music Spain (2019)
- Aitana feat. Lola Indigo - Me Quedo / Universal Music Spain (2019)
- Paula Cendejas - Ya Te Avisé / Whoa! Music / Warner Music Spain (2019)
- C. Tangana - Para Repartir / Sony Records (2019)
- Coral Casino - Rally (feat Alizzz) / Whoa! Music / Warner Music Spain (2019)
- Feid - Buena Mala / Universal Music Latino (2019)
- Ana Torroja – Llama / Promotodo México (2019)
- Paula Cendejas – Sal De Mi Cabeza / Whoa! Music / Warner Music Spain (2019)
- C. Tangana y Dellafuente – París / Sony Records (2019)
- C. Tangana y MC Bin Laden – Pa' Llamar Tu Atención / Sony Records (2019)
- Gabriela Richardson – Crime / Sony Records Spain (2019)
- Becky G – Booty Featuring C. Tangana / Sony Records Spain (2018)
- Maikel Delacalle – El Problema / Universal Records (2018)
- Maikel Delacalle – Latinoamericana / Universal Records (2018)
- C. Tangana – Llorando en la Limo / Sony Records (2018)
- Jesse Báez – No Eres Tu feat C. Tangana / Universal (2018)
- Javiera Mena – Espejo (single) / Sony Music 2018
- Doja Cat – Down Low / RCA Records
- Javiera Mena – Cerca (single) / Sony Music 2018
- Javiera Mena – Aire (single) / Sony Music 2018
- C. Tangana – No Te Pegas feat. A.CHAL / Sony Music (2018)
- C. Tangana y Dellafuente – Guerrera / Sony Music (2017)
- C. Tangana – Demasiado Tarde (single) / Sony Music (2017)
- C. Tangana – Tiempo / Sony Music (2017)
- C. Tangana – De Pie / Sony Music (2017)
- C. Tangana – Pop Ur Pussy / Sony Music (2017)
- C. Tangana – Mala Mujer / Sony Music (2017)
- C. Tangana – Persiguiéndonos/ Agorazein (2016)
- Rosalía y C. Tangana – Antes de Morirme / Agorazein (2016)
- Rosalia y C. Tangana – Llámame más tarde / Agorazein (2016)

== Certifications ==
Alizzz' productions have been awarded the following Music recording certifications:

Albums

C. Tangana – El Madrileño / Sony Records (2021)

- Platinum Spain

Singles

C. Tangana – Parteme La Cara feat Ed Maverick / Sony Records (2021)

- Gold Spain

C. Tangana – Ingobernable (feat Gipsy Kings / Sony Records (2020)

- 2 x Platinum Spain

C. Tangana – Los Tontos / Sony Records (2020)

- 1 x Platinum Spain

C. Tangana – Comerte Entera feat Toquihno / Sony Records (2020)

- Gold Spain

C. Tangana – Tu Me Dejaste de Querer / Sony Records (2020)

- 6× Platinum Spain

C. Tangana – Demasidas Mujeres / Sony Records (2020)

- 3 x Platinum Spain

C. Tangana – Nunca Estoy / Sony Records (2020)

- 3 x Platinum Spain

C. Tangana y Paloma Mami – No Te Debí Besar / Sony Records (2019)

- 2 x Platinum Spain
- Gold USA

Aitana featuring Lola Indigo – Me Quedo / Universal Music Spain (2019)

- Platinum Spain

C. Tangana y Dellafuente – París / Sony Records (2019)

- Gold Spain

Piso 21 featuring Christian Nodal - Pa' Olvidarme De Ella / Warner Music Mexico (2019)

- 2x Diamante Mex

MC Bin Laden, C. Tangana & Alizzz – Pa Llamar / Sony Records (2019)

- Platinum Spain

Becky G Featuring C. Tangana & Alizzz – Booty / Sony Records (2018)

- 3xPlatinum: Spain
- 2xPlatinum: US

C. Tangana – Llorando en la Limo / Sony Records (2018)

- Platinum: Spain

Dellafuente y C. Tangana – Guerrera / Sony Music (2017)

- 2xPlatinum: Spain

C. Tangana – De Pie / Sony Music (2017)

- Gold: Spain

C. Tangana – Mala Mujer / Sony Music (2017) (ÍDOLO Album)

- Gold: Chile, Argentina, Mexico
- 3xPlatinum: Spain

C. Tangana – Antes de Morirme Featuring Rosalia / Agorazein (2016)

- 4xPlatinum: Spain
