= Nathy Peluso discography =

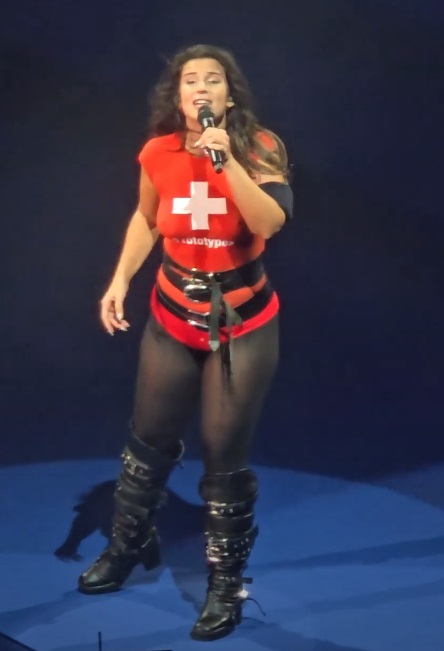
- Peluso performing in 2024
- Studio albums: 2
- EPs: 2
- Singles: 28
- Mixtapes: 1

The discography of Argentine and Spanish singer-songwriter Nathy Peluso consists of two studio albums, one mixtape, two extended plays, and 28 singles (including three as a featured artist).

== Albums ==
List of studio albums, with selected details, chart positions, and certifications
Title	Details	Peak chart positions	Certifications
Title	Details	SPA	Certifications
Calambre	Released: 2 October 2020; Label: Sony; Formats: LP, CD, digital download, streaming	5	PROMUSICAE: Gold
Grasa	Released: 24 May 2024; Label: Sony; Formats: LP, digital download, streaming	9	

=== Mixtapes ===
List of mixtapes, with selected details
Title	Details
Esmeralda	Released: 5 October 2017; Label: none (self-released); Formats: digital download, streaming

== Extended plays ==
List of extended plays, with selected details, and chart positions
Title	Details	Peak chart positions
Title	Details	SPA
La Sandunguera	Released: 6 April 2018; Label: Everlasting; Formats: LP, CD, digital download, streaming	28
Club Grasa	Released: 12 September 2024; Label: Sony; Formats: digital download, streaming	—
"—" denotes a recording that did not chart or was not released in that territory.

== Singles ==
=== As lead artist ===
List of singles as lead artist, showing year released, chart positions, certifications, and originating album
Title	Year	Peak chart positions								Certifications	Album
Title	Year	ARG	CHL	COL	MEX	PAR	SLV	SPA	URU	Certifications	Album
"Corashe"	2017	—	—	—	—	—	—	—	—		Non-album single
"La Sandunguera"	2018	—	—	—	—	—	—	—	—	PROMUSICAE: Gold	La Sandunguera
"Estoy Triste"	2018	—	—	—	—	—	—	—	—		La Sandunguera
"Natikillah"	2019	—	—	—	—	—	—	—	—		Non-album single
"Copa Glasé"	2019	—	—	—	—	—	—	—	—		Non-album single
"Business Woman"	2020	—	—	—	—	—	—	—	—		Calambre
"No Se Perdona" (with Rels B)	2020	—	—	—	—	—	—	64	—	AMPROFON: Platinum; PROMUSICAE: Gold	Non-album single
"Buenos Aires"	2020	—	—	—	—	—	—	—	—	PROMUSICAE: Gold	Calambre
"Sana Sana"	2020	—	—	—	—	—	—	—	—	AMPROFON: Gold; PROMUSICAE: Gold	Calambre
"Nathy Peluso: Bzrp Music Sessions, Vol. 36" (with Bizarrap)	2020	4	14	—	—	24	—	11	9	PROMUSICAE: 3× Platinum	Non-album single
"Delito"	2021	30	—	—	—	—	—	29	—	PROMUSICAE: Platinum	Calambre
"Mafiosa"	2021	—	—	—	—	—	—	89	—	PROMUSICAE: Platinum	Non-album single
"Ateo" (with C. Tangana)	2021	76	—	83	4	—	11	1	—	AMPROFON: Gold; PROMUSICAE: 7× Platinum; RIAA: Gold (Latin)	La Sobremesa
"Vivir Así Es Morir de Amor"	2021	14	—	—	—	57	—	36	14	PROMUSICAE: Platinum	Non-album single
"Emergencia"	2022	—	—	—	—	—	—	55	—	PROMUSICAE: Gold	Non-album single
"Estás buenísimo"	2022	62	—	—	—	—	—	—	—		Non-album single
"Tonta"	2023	—	—	—	—	—	—	83	—		Non-album single
"Salvaje"	2023	—	—	—	—	—	—	70	—		Non-album single
"Ella Tiene" (with Tiago PZK)	2023	55	—	—	—	—	—	50	—	PROMUSICAE: Gold	Non-album single
"Jet Set" (with Emilia)	2024	30	—	—	—	—	—	58	—		.MP3
"Aprender a Amar"	2024	—	—	—	—	—	—	—	—		Grasa
"Legendario"	2024	—	—	—	—	—	—	—	—		Grasa
"XQ Eres Así" (with Álvaro Díaz)	2024	—	—	—	—	—	—	—	—		Sayonara: Finales Alternos
"De Maravisha" (with Tokischa)	2024	—	—	—	—	—	—	—	—		TBA
"Erotika"	2025	—	—	—	—	—	—	75	—		TBA
"Perfecto Final"	2025	—	—	—	—	—	—	—	—		Non-album single
"La Tirana"	2025	—	—	—	—	—	—	—	—		Non-album single

=== As featured artist ===
List of singles as featured artist, showing year released, chart positions, certifications, and originating album
Title	Year	Peak chart positions								Certifications	Album
Title	Year	ARG	GUA	HUN	MEX	PAN	SLV	SPA	US Latin	Certifications	Album
"Solo" (H Ilimitados featuring Nathy Peluso)	2017	—	—	—	—	—	—	—	—		Non-album single
"Mantra Zai" (DJ Swet featuring Nathy Peluso)	2017	—	—	—	—	—	—	—	—		Mudra
"Pa Mis Muchachas" (Christina Aguilera, Becky G and Nicki Nicole featuring Nathy Peluso)	2021	83	15	24	28	15	6	68	37	RIAA: Gold (Latin)	La Fuerza and Aguilera
"—" denotes a title that was not released or did not chart in that territory.

== Other charted and certified songs ==
List of other charted songs, showing year released, chart positions, certifications, and originating album
Title	Year	Peaks	Certifications	Album
Title	Year	ARG	Certifications	Album
"Puro Veneno"	2020	—	PROMUSICAE: Gold	Calambre
"Gato Malo" (with Karol G)	2021	—	RIAA: Gold (Latin); PROMUSICAE: Gold	KG0516
"Argentina" (with Trueno)	2022	48		Bien o mal
"—" denotes a title that was not released or did not chart in that territory.
