= Grasa Tour =

2024–2026 concert tour by Nathy Peluso

- Tour by Nathy Peluso
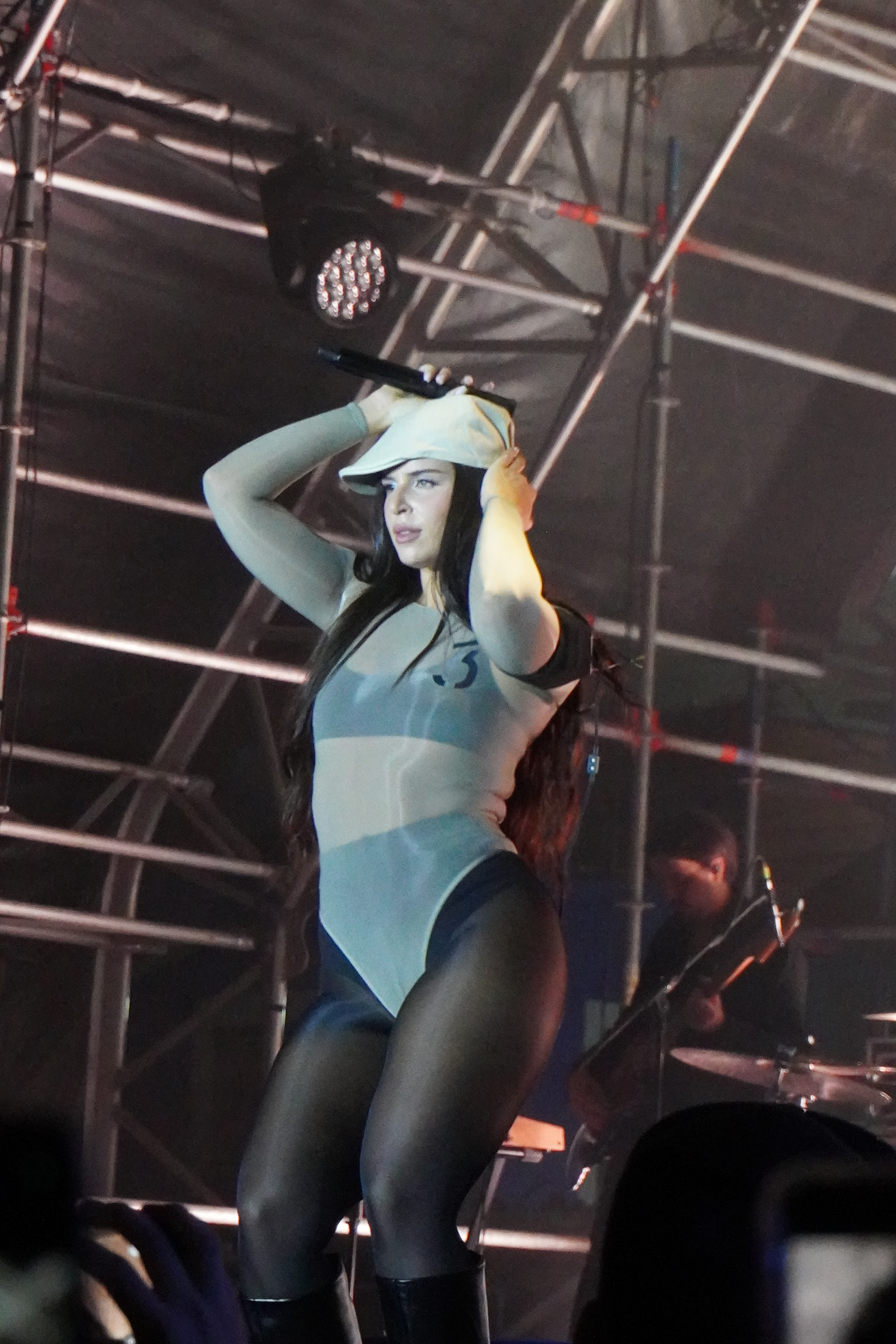
- Peluso performing live in Mexico in 2025
- Location: Europe; North America; Latin America
- Associated album: Grasa
- Start date: October 27, 2024
- End date: February 17, 2026
- No. of shows: 41
- Website: nathypeluso.com

Nathy Peluso concert chronology
- Calambre Tour (2021–2022); Grasa Tour (2024–2026)

Grasa Tour is a concert tour by Argentinian singer-songwriter Nathy Peluso, in support of her third studio album Grasa. The tour began on October 27, 2024, in Mexico City, and concluded on February 17, 2026, in Madrid, Spain.

== Background ==
Peluso released her fourth studio album Grasa on May 24, 2024, through Sony Music Latin and 5020 Records. Grasa marked Peluso’s first major LP release since her Grammy-winning album Calambre.

On June 18, 2024, through Instagram, the singer revealed the European and U.S. legs of the tour. On June 24, she announced the first three dates of the Latin American leg of the Grasa Tour. On October 25, she shared the tour’s concert dress code on her social media. In December of that same year, she announced new tour dates in Spain and Latin America. On April 4, 2025, her participation in the Portuguese festival NOS Alive was confirmed. On June 18, 2025, she added a date in San Juan, Puerto Rico. In the first weeks of August 2025, new Mexican dates were added to the tour. On September 22, 2025 Peluso announced new spanish dates.

== Critical reception ==
=== North America ===
The North American leg of the Grasa tour was met with positive reviews. Clash Music, reviewing the Miami stop at the Fillmore, described the show as "far more than music… a declaration of arrival" and praised Peluso’s "bone-chilling vocals" and "brash choreography". Miami New Times called the same performance “an unforgettable experience” that transformed a minimalist stage into "a modern vintage lounge" highlighting "El Día Que Perdí Mi Juventud" as a standout moment, though noting that occasional use of Auto-Tune slightly detracted from her natural voice. In Los Angeles, Grimy Goods commended her "electrifying stage presence" and versatility, moving from the assertive Business Woman to the sensual "Erotika" and the intensity of "Aprender a Amar" and "Real", with a mid-set pause to connect intimately with the audience. Variety, reviewing the final U.S. show in Los Angeles, described Peluso’s performance as a masterclass in genre-blending, highlighting her commanding stage presence and dynamic vocal range, and noting that she effortlessly fused elements of hip-hop, R&B, and Latin music to create a unique and captivating experience.

=== Europe ===
Rolling Stone Italia, reviewing the Milan concert at Fabrique, described Peluso’s performance as intense and powerful, highlighting her seamless fusion of music, dance, theater, and performance art. The review emphasized the virtuosic control she maintained, noting that she captivated the audience by alternating between melodramatic moments and street-style sequences, all delivered over a relentless, nearly two-hour pace. Clash Music, reviewing the London concert at the Roundhouse, described Peluso’s performance as far more than music is a declaration of arrival and praised her bone-chilling vocals and brash choreography.

== Setlist ==
The following setlist was obtained from the 27 October 2022 concert, held at the Auditorio Nacional in Mexico City, Mexico. It does not represent all concerts for the duration of the tour.

1. "Corleone"
2. "Aprender a Amar"
3. "Business Woman"
4. "Legendario"
5. "Real"
6. "Delito"
7. "Ateo"
8. "Mafiosa"
9. "Puro Veneno"
10. "La Presa"
11. "Todo Roto"
12. "Nathy Peluso: BZRP Music Sessions, Vol. 36"
13. "Manhattan"
14. "Sana Sana"
15. "La Mentira"
16. "Corashe"
17. "Mamá"
18. "El Día que Perdí mi Juventud"
19. "Emergencia"
20. "Salvaje"
21. "Menina"
22. "Buenos Aires»"
23. "Remedio"
24. "Vivir Así es Morir de Amor"
25. "Escaleras de Metal"
26. "Ideas Radicales"

== Tour dates ==
List of 2024 concerts
Date (2024)	City	Country	Venue
October 27	Mexico City	Mexico	Auditorio Nacional
October 30	Buenos Aires	Argentina	Movistar Arena

List of 2025 concerts
Date (2025)	City	Country	Venue
February 9	Milan	Italy	Fabrique
February 11	Berlin	Germany	Columbiahalle
February 13	Amsterdam	Netherlands	Melkweg
February 15	Paris	France	Salle Pleyel
February 16	Brussels	Belgium	Cirque Royal
February 19	London	England	Roundhouse
March 5	Miami Beach	United States	Fillmore Miami Beach
March 7	Washington, D. C.	United States	9:30 Club
March 8	New York City	United States	Brooklyn Paramount
March 12	Chicago	United States	The Vic
March 15	Los Angeles	United States	The Novo
March 22 (Note: The concert on 22 March 2025 in Santiago was part of the Lollapalooza Festival.)	Santiago	Chile	Cerrillos Park
March 23 (Note: The concert on 23 March 2025 in Buenos Aires was part of the Lollapalooza Festival.)	Buenos Aires	Argentina	Hipódromo de San Isidro
March 25	Montevideo	Uruguay	Teatro de Verano
March 27	Córdoba	Argentina	Plaza de la Música
March 29 (Note: The concert on 29 March 2025 in Bogotá was part of the Estéreo Picnic Festival.)	Bogotá	Colombia	Simon Bolívar Park
April 4 (Note: The concert on 4 April 2025 in Monterrey was part of the Tecate Pa'l Norte Festival.)	Monterrey	Mexico	Parque Fundidora
April 6 (Note: The concert on 6 April 2025 in Mexico City was part of the Axe Ceremonia Festival.)	Mexico City	Mexico	Bicentenario Park
June 12 (Note: The concert on 12 June 2025 in Calvià was part of the Mallorca Live Festival.)	Calvià	Spain	Antiguo Aquapark Calvià
June 14 (Note: The concert on 14 June 2025 in Barcelona was part of the Sónar Festival.)	Barcelona	Spain	Fira de Barcelona
June 20 (Note: The concert on 20 June 2025 in Marbella was part of the Starlite Festival.)	Marbella	Spain	Auditorio Starlite
June 28 (Note: The concert on 28 June 2025 in Brussels was part of the Couleur Cafe Festival.)	Brussels	Belgium	Osseghem Park
July 4 (Note: The concert on 4 July 2025 in Las Palmas was part of the Granca Live Festival.)	Las Palmas	Spain	Gran Canaria Stadium
July 10 (Note: The concert on 10 July 2025 in Lisbon was part of the NOS Alive Festival.)	Lisbon	Portugal	Passeio Marítimo de Algés
July 12 (Note: The concert on 12 July 2025 in Bilbao was part of the Bilbao BBK Live Festival.)	Bilbao	Spain	Kobetamendi
July 17 (Note: The concert on 17 July 2025 in Köniz was part of the Gurten Festival.)	Köniz	Switzerland	Monte Gurten
July 18 (Note: The concert on 18 July 2025 in Montreux was part of the Montreux Jazz Festival.)	Montreux	Switzerland	Escenario del Lago
July 20 (Note: The concert on 20 July 2025 in Paris was part of the Lollapalooza Paris Festival.)	Paris	France	Longchamp Racecourse
July 23 (Note: The concert on 23 July 2025 in Lanuza was part of the Pirineos Sur Festival.)	Lanuza	Spain	Escenario Flotante de Lanuza
July 26 (Note: The concert on 26 July 2025 in A Coruña was part of the Morriña Festival.)	A Coruña	Spain	Port of A Coruña
July 30 (Note: The concert on 30 July 2025 in Chiclana de la Frontera was part of the Concert Music Festival.)	Chiclana de la Frontera	Spain	Islote de Sancti Petri
October 18 (Note: The concert on 18 October 2025 in Guanajuato was part of the Internacional Cervatino Festival.)	Guanajuato	Mexico	Los Pastitos
October 25 (Note: The concert on 25 October 2025 in Querétaro was part of the Pulso GNP Festival.)	Querétaro	Mexico	Autódromo de Querétaro
October 28	Mexico City	Mexico	Pepsi Center
October 30	San Juan	Puerto Rico	Coca-Cola Music Hall

List of 2026 concerts
Date (2026)	City	Country	Venue
February 14	Barcelona	Spain	Palau Sant Jordi
February 17	Madrid	Spain	Movistar Arena

=== Cancelled shows ===
List of cancelled shows
Date (2024)	City	Country	Venue	Reason	Ref.
November 6	Santiago	Chile	Movistar Arena	Logistics problems	
