= 22nd Annual Latin Grammy Awards =

Latin music awards presented Nov 2021

22nd Latin Grammy Awards
- Date: November 18, 2021
- Venue: MGM Grand Garden Arena, Paradise, United States
- Hosted by: Carlos Rivera, Ana Brenda Contreras and Roselyn Sánchez

Highlights
- Most awards: Camilo (4)
- Most nominations: Camilo (10)
- Person of the Year: Rubén Blades

Television/radio coverage
- Network: TelevisaUnivision

The 22nd Annual Latin Grammy Awards were held on Thursday, November 18, 2021, at the MGM Grand Garden Arena, Las Vegas to honor the best musical releases within Latin music released from June 1, 2020, to May 31, 2021. The nominations were announced on September 28, 2021. The ceremony was aired live on TelevisaUnivision.

In June 2021, Panamanian musician Rubén Blades was named Person of the Year by the Latin Recording Academy, unlike last year where the main ceremony took place in a normal way but the Person of the Year award was not given nor did the ceremony for the award took place due to the COVID-19 pandemic, this year's ceremony for the award took place on November 17, 2021, the day before the main ceremony as it usually does.

Singers and musicians Martinho da Vila, Emmanuel, Pete Escovedo, Sheila E., Fito Páez, Milly Quezada, Joaquín Sabina and Gilberto Santa Rosa received the Lifetime Achievement Award while Mexican producer Guillermo "Memo" Acosta and Colombian accordionist Egidio Cuadrado are this year's recipients of the Trustees Award.

== Performances ==
Artist(s)	Song(s)	Ref.
Gloria Estefan; Farina; Giulia Be; Diego Torres; Pedro Capó; Anitta; Carlinhos Brown	"Abriendo Puertas" "Cuando Hay Amor" "Magalenha"	
Grupo Firme	"Me Gustas" "Ya Superame"	
Camilo	"Vida de Rico" "Kesi"	
Myke Towers; Jay Wheeler; DJ Nelson; Sergio George	"Pin Pin" "La Curiosidad"	
Carlos Rivera; Nella; Paula Arenas	Tribute to Armando Manzanero "Esta Tarde Vi Llover" "Todavía"	
C. Tangana; La Húngara; Jorge Drexler; Nathy Peluso; Antonio Carmona; Natalia Lafourcade; Omar Apollo; Israel Fernández; Diego Del Morao	"Ingobernable"	
Ozuna; Antony Santos	"Del Mar" "Señor Juez"	
Mon Laferte; La Arrolladora Banda El Limón; Gloria Trevi	"Se Me Va a Quemar el Corazón" "La Mujer"	
Juanes; Rubén Albarrán; Emmanuel Del Real	"No Tengo Dinero"	
Rubén Blades	"Paula C"	
Christina Aguilera; Becky G Nathy Peluso; Nicki Nicole	"Somos Nada" "Pa Mis Muchachas"	
Juan Luis Guerra 4.40	"Rosalia" "Vale la Pena" "El Farolito"	
Calibre 50; Banda el Recodo	"A la Antiguita" "Esta Vida es Muy Bonita"	
Danna Paola	"Calla Tú"	
Los Dos Carnales	"El Envidioso"	
Yotuel; Gente De Zona; Descemer Bueno; Maykel Osorbo; El Funky	"Patria y Vida"	
Maná; Alejandro Fernández	"Mariposa Traicionera"	
Bad Bunny	"Maldita Pobreza"	

- Note: C. Tangana performed alongside artists such as Natalia Lafourcade, Nathy Peluso, Jorge Drexler, La Húngara, Alizzz, among others.

== Presenters ==
- Bella Thorne and Silvestre Dangond – presented Best Traditional Pop Vocal Album
- Evaluna Montaner and Ricardo Montaner – introduced Camilo
- Kimberly Dos Ramos and Joss Favela – presented Best Norteño Album
- María Becerra and Fito Páez – presented Best Pop Vocal Album
- Sofia Carson and Jorge Soler – presented Best Urban Music Album
- Milly Quezada – introduced Juan Luis Guerra 4.40
- Sofia Reyes and Eladio Carrión – presented Best Reggaeton Performance
- Ángela Aguilar and Matteo Bocelli – presented Best New Artist
- Gloria Estefan – introduced Yotuel, Gente De Zona, Descemer Bueno, Maykel Osorbo, El Funky
- Livia Brito and Emmanuel – presented Record of the Year
- Jorge Drexler and Natalia Lafourcade – presented Song of the Year
- Pepe Aguilar – presented Album of the Year

== Winners and nominees ==
The nominations were announced on September 28, 2021. Winners are listed in bold.

=== General ===
Record of the Year

"Talvez" – Caetano Veloso and Tom Veloso

Mário Adnet & Cézar Mendes, record producers; Lucas Ariel & Lucas Nunes, recording engineers; Daniel Carvalho, mixer; Daniel Carvalho, mastering engineer

- "Si Hubieras Querido" – Pablo Alborán
  - Julio Reyes Copello, record producer; Pablo Pulido, Julio Reyes Copello & Natalia Schlesinger, recording engineers; Nicolás Ramírez, mixer; Gene Grimaldi, mastering engineer
- "Todo de Ti" – Rauw Alejandro
  - Rauw Alejandro & Luis J. González, record producers; José M. Collazo, recording engineer; José M. Collazo, mixer; Sensei Sound, mastering engineer
- "Un Amor Eterno (Versión Balada)" – Marc Anthony
  - Motiff & Julio Reyes Copello, record producers; Nicolás “Na’vi” De La Espriella, Julio Reyes Copello & Daniel Uribe, recording engineers; Nicolás Ramírez & Julio Reyes Copello, mixers; Gene Grimaldi, mastering engineer
- "A Tu Lado" – Paula Arenas
  - Maria Elisa Ayerbe & Sebastián Mejía, record producers; Maria Elisa Ayerbe & Sebastián Mejía, recording engineers; Maria Elisa Ayerbe, mixer; Camilo Silva, mastering engineer
- "Bohemio" – Andrés Calamaro & Julio Iglesias
  - Carlos Narea, record producer; Ángel Martos & Carlos Narea, mixers; Ángel Martos, mastering engineer
- "Vida de Rico" – Camilo
  - Édgar Barrera & Camilo, record producers; Édgar Barrera, Richard Bravo & Nicolás Ramírez, recording engineers; Luis Barrera Jr., mixer; Mike Bozzi, mastering engineer
- "Suéltame, Bogotá" – Diamante Eléctrico
  - Juan Galeano & Andrés Rebellón, record producers; Diamante Eléctrico & Andrés Rebellón, recording engineers; Andrés Rebellón, mixer; Gavin Lurssen, mastering engineer
- "Amén" – Ricardo Montaner, Mau y Ricky, Camilo, Evaluna Montaner
  - Richi López & Ricardo Montaner, record producers; Richi López, Aaron Sterling & Guillermo Vadalá, recording engineers; Manny Marroquin, mixer; Emerson Mancini, mastering engineer
- "Dios Así lo Quiso" – Ricardo Montaner & Juan Luis Guerra
  - David "Xaxo" Julca, Jonathan "Xaxo" Julca, Yasmil Marrufo & Ricardo Montaner, record producers; Luis Alejandro Bermúdez, Allan Leschhorn, Yasmil Marrufo, Dario Moscatelli, Raniero Palm & Ruben Salas, recording engineers; Javier Garza, mixer; Mike Fuller, mastering engineer
- "Te Olvidaste" – C. Tangana & Omar Apollo
  - Alizzz, Rafa Arcaute, C. Tangana & Federico Vindver, record producers; Rafa Arcaute, Nathan Phillips & Federico Vindver, recording engineers; Delbert Bowers, mixer; Chris Athens, mastering engineer

Album of the Year

SALSWING! – Rubén Blades and Roberto Delgado & Orquesta

Roberto Delgado, album producer; Oscar Marín, album recording engineer; Roberto Delgado & Oscar Marín, album mixers; Rubén Blades, songwriter; Daniel Ovie, album mastering engineer

- Vértigo – Pablo Alborán
  - Pablo Alborán & Julio Reyes Copello, album producers; Pablo Pulido, Julio Reyes Copello & Natalia Schlesinger, album recording engineers; Nicolás Ramírez, album mixer; Pablo Alborán, songwriter; Gene Grimaldi, album mastering engineer
- Mis Amores – Paula Arenas
  - Maria Elisa Ayerbe, Sebastián Mejía & Julio Reyes Copello, album producers; Maria Elisa Ayerbe, Sebastián Mejía & Julio Reyes Copello, album recording engineers; Maria Elisa Ayerbe & Julio Reyes Copello, album mixers; Paula Arenas, María Elisa Ayerbe, Kany García, Fernando Osorio, Julio Reyes Copello & Juan Pablo Vega, songwriters; Camilo Silva, album mastering engineer
- El Último Tour Del Mundo – Bad Bunny
  - Mag & Tainy, album producers; Josh Gudwin, album mixer; Bad Bunny, Mag & Tainy, songwriters; Colin Leonard, album mastering engineer
- Mis Manos – Camilo
  - Édgar Barrera & Camilo, album producers; Natalia Ramírez & Nicolás Ramírez, album recording engineers; Maddox Chhim, album mixer; Édgar Barrera & Camilo, songwriters; Mike Bozzi, album mastering engineer
- Nana, Tom, Vinicius – Nana Caymmi
  - Dori Caymmi, album producer; Mario Jorge Bruno, Mario Gil, Kira Malevskaia & Gabriel Teixeira, album recording engineers; Mario Gil, album mixer; Vinicius de Moraes & Tom Jobim, songwriters; Mario Gil, album mastering engineer
- Privé – Juan Luis Guerra
  - Juan Luis Guerra & Janina Rosado, album producers; Allan Leschhorn, album recording engineer; Allan Leschhorn, album mixer; Juan Luis Guerra, songwriter; Adam Ayan, album mastering engineer
- Origen – Juanes
  - Juanes & Sebastian Krys, album producers; Said Edid, Daniel Galindo, Juanes, Sebastian Krys & Pepe Ortega, album recording engineers; Sebastian Krys, album mixer; Brian Lucey, album mastering engineer
- Un Canto por México, Vol. 2 – Natalia Lafourcade
  - Kiko Campos, album producer; José Luis Fernández, Rubén López Arista, Alan Ortiz Grande & Alan Saucedo, album recording engineers; Rubén López Arista, album mixer; Michael Fuller, album mastering engineer
- El Madrileño – C. Tangana
  - Alizzz, Victor Martínez & C. Tangana, album producers; Alizzz, album recording engineer; Delbert Bowers, album mixer; Alizzz, Victor Martínez & C. Tangana, songwriters; Chris Athens, album mastering engineer

Song of the Year

"Patria y Vida" – Yotuel, Gente De Zona, Descemer Bueno, Maykel Osorbo, El Funky

Descemer Bueno, El Funky, Gente De Zona, Yadam González, Beatriz Luengo, Maykel Osorbo & Yotuel, songwriters

- "A Tu Lado" – Paula Arenas
  - Paula Arenas & Maria Elisa Ayerbe, songwriters (Paula Arenas)
- "A Veces" – Diamante Eléctrico
  - Diamante Eléctrico, songwriters
- "Agua" – Tainy & J Balvin
  - J Balvin, Alejandro Borrero, Jhay Cortez, Kevyn Mauricio Cruz Moreno, Derek Drymon, Mark Harrison, Stephen Hillenburg, Alejandro Ramirez, Ivanni Rodríguez, Blaise Smith, Tainy & Juan Camilo Vargas, songwriters
- "Canción Bonita" – Carlos Vives & Ricky Martin
  - Rafa Arcaute, Ricky Martin, Mauricio Rengifo, Andrés Torres & Carlos Vives, songwriters
- "Dios Así lo Quiso" – Ricardo Montaner & Juan Luis Guerra
  - Camilo, David Julca, Jonathan Julca, Yasmil Jesús Marrufo & Ricardo Montaner, songwriters
- "Hawái" – Maluma
  - Édgar Barrera, René Cano, Kevyn Cruz, Johan Espinosa, Kevin Jiménez, Miky La Sensa, Bryan Lezcano, Maluma, Andrés Uribe & Juan Camilo Vargas, songwriters
- "Mi Guitarra" – Javier Limón, Juan Luis Guerra & Nella
  - Javier Limón, songwriter
- "Que Se Sepa Nuestro Amor" – Mon Laferte & Alejandro Fernández
  - El David Aguilar & Mon Laferte, songwriters
- "Si Hubieras Querido" – Pablo Alborán
  - Pablo Alborán, Nicolás “Na’vi” De La Espriella, Diana Fuentes & Julio Reyes Copello, songwriters
- "Todo de Ti" – Rauw Alejandro
  - Rauw Alejandro, José M. Collazo, Luis J. González, Rafael E. Pabón Navedo & Eric Pérez Rovira, songwriters
- "Vida de Rico" – Camilo
  - Édgar Barrera & Camilo, songwriters

Best New Artist

Juliana Velásquez

- Giulia Be
- María Becerra
- Bizarrap
- Boza
- Zoe Gotusso
- Humbe
- Rita Indiana
- Lasso
- Paloma Mami
- Marco Mares

=== Pop ===
Best Pop Vocal Album

Mis Manos – Camilo

- Dios los Cría – Andrés Calamaro
- Munay – Pedro Capó
- K.O. – Danna Paola
- De México – Reik

Best Traditional Pop Vocal Album

Privé – Juan Luis Guerra

- Vértigo – Pablo Alborán
- Mis Amores – Paula Arenas
- Doce Margaritas – Nella
- Atlántico a Pie – Diego Torres

Best Pop Song

"Vida de Rico" – Camilo

Édgar Barrera & Camilo, songwriters

- "Adiós" – Sebastián Yatra
  - David Julca, Jonathan Julca, Pablo López & Sebastián Yatra, songwriters
- "Ahí" – Nella
  - Javier Limón, songwriter
- "Canción Bonita" – Carlos Vives & Ricky Martin
  - Rafa Arcaute, Ricky Martin, Mauricio Rengifo, Andrés Torres & Carlos Vives, songwriters
- "La Mujer" – Mon Laferte & Gloria Trevi
  - Mon Laferte, songwriter

=== Urban ===
Best Urban Fusion/Performance

"Tattoo (Remix)" – Rauw Alejandro & Camilo

- "El Amor es una Moda" – Alcover, Juan Magán & Don Omar
- "Nathy Peluso: Bzrp Music Sessions, Vol. 36" – Bizarrap & Nathy Peluso
- "Diplomatico" – Major Lazer featuring Guaynaa
- "Hawái (Remix)" – Maluma & The Weeknd

Best Reggaeton Performance

"Bichota" – Karol G

- "Tu Veneno" – J Balvin
- "La Tóxica" – Farruko
- "Caramelo" – Ozuna
- "La Curiosidad" – Jay Wheeler, DJ Nelson & Myke Towers

Best Urban Music Album

El Último Tour Del Mundo – Bad Bunny

- Goldo Funky – Akapellah
- Monarca – Eladio Carrión
- ENOC – Ozuna
- Lyke Mike – Myke Towers

Best Rap/Hip Hop Song

"Booker T" – Bad Bunny

Bad Bunny & Marco Daniel Borrero, songwriters

- "Condenados" – Akapellah
  - Akapellah & Pedro Querales, songwriters
- "La Vendedora de Placer" – Lito MC Cassidy
  - Lito MC Cassidy, songwriter
- "SANA SANA" – Nathy Peluso
  - Rafa Arcaute, Gino Borri, Illmind, Ángel López, Nathy Peluso & Federico Vindver, songwriters
- "Snow Tha Product: Bzrp Music Sessions, Vol. 39" – Bizarrap & Snow Tha Product
  - Bizarrap & Snow Tha Product, songwriters

Best Urban Song

"Patria y Vida" – Yotuel, Gente De Zona, Descemer Bueno, Maykel Osorbo, El Funky

Descemer Bueno, El Funky, Gente De Zona, Yadam González, Beatriz Luengo, Maykel Osorbo & Yotuel, songwriters

- "A Fuego" – Farina
  - Farina, Joshua Javier Méndez, Sech, Jonathan Emmanuel Tobar & Jorge Valdés Vásquez, songwriters
- "Agua" – Tainy & J Balvin
  - J Balvin, Alejandro Borrero, Jhay Cortez, Kevyn Mauricio Cruz Moreno, Derek Drymon, Mark Harrison, Stephen Hillenburg, Alejandro Ramírez, Ivanni Rodríguez, Blaise Smith, Tainy & Juan Camilo Vargas, songwriters
- "Dákiti" – Bad Bunny & Jhay Cortez
  - Bad Bunny, Jhay Cortez, Nydia Laner, Gabriel Mora, Egbert Rosa & Tainy, songwriters
- "La Curiosidad" – Jay Wheeler, DJ Nelson & Myke Towers
  - Myke Towers & Jay Wheeler, songwriters

=== Rock ===
Best Rock Album

El Pozo Brillante – Vicentico

- Curso de Levitación Intensivo – Bunbury
- Control – Caramelos de Cianuro
- Los Mesoneros Live desde Pangea – Los Mesoneros
- Luz – No Te Va Gustar

Best Rock Song

"Ahora 1" – Vicentico

Vicentico, songwriter

- "Distintos" – De La Tierra
  - Andrés Giménez & Andreas Kisser, songwriters
- "El Sur" – Love of Lesbian featuring Bunbury
  - Santi Balmes & Julián Saldarriaga, songwriters
- "Hice Todo Mal" – Las Ligas Menores
  - Anabella Cartolano, songwriter
- "Venganza" – No Te Va Gustar & Nicki Nicole
  - Emiliano Brancciari & Nicki Nicole, songwriters

Best Pop/Rock Album

Origen – Juanes

- Mira Lo Que Me Hiciste Hacer – Diamante Eléctrico
- Mis Grandes Éxitos – Adan Jodorowsky & The French Kiss
- V. E. H. N. – Love of Lesbian
- El Reflejo – Rayos Laser

Best Pop/Rock Song

"Hong Kong" – C. Tangana & Andrés Calamaro

Alizzz, Andrés Calamaro, Jorge Drexler, Víctor Martínez & C. Tangana, songwriters

- "A Veces" – Diamante Eléctrico
  - Diamante Eléctrico, songwriters
- "Cosmos (Antisistema Solar)" – Love of Lesbian
  - Santi Balmes & Julián Saldarriaga, songwriters
- "El Duelo" – Zoé
  - Sergio Eduardo Acosta & León Larregui, songwriters
- "Ganas" – Zoe Gotusso
  - Zoe Gotusso, Nicolás Landa & Diego Mema, songwriters

=== Alternative ===
Best Alternative Music Album

Calambre – Nathy Peluso

- KiCk i – Arca
- Tropiplop – Aterciopelados
- Cabra – Cabra
- Un Segundo MTV Unplugged – Café Tacvba

Best Alternative Song

"Nominao" – C. Tangana & Jorge Drexler

Alizzz, Jorge Drexler & C. Tangana, songwriters

- "AGARRATE" – Nathy Peluso
  - Rafa Arcaute, Pedro Campos & Nathy Peluso, songwriters
- "Antidiva" – Aterciopelados
  - Andrea Echeverri, songwriter
- "Confía" – Gepe & Vicentico
  - Gepe, songwriter
- "Te Olvidaste" – C. Tangana & Omar Apollo
  - Omar Apollo, Rafa Arcaute, C. Tangana & Federico Vindver, songwriters

=== Tropical ===
Best Salsa Album

SALSA PLUS! – Rubén Blades and Roberto Delgado & Orquesta

- En Cuarentena – El Gran Combo de Puerto Rico
- El Día es Hoy – Willy García
- Colegas – Gilberto Santa Rosa
- En Barranquilla Me Quedo, El Disco Homenaje a Joe Arroyo (Varios Artistas) – José Gaviria & Milton Salcedo, album producers

Best Cumbia/Vallenato Album

Las Locuras Mías – Silvestre Dangond

- Pa' Que se Esmigajen los Parlantes – Diego Daza & Carlos Rueda
- De Buenos Aires para el Mundo – Los Ángeles Azules
- Esencia – Felipe Peláez
- Noche de Serenata – Osmar Pérez & Geño Gamez

Best Merengue/Bachata Album

Es Merengue ¿Algún Problema? – Sergio Vargas

- Bachata Queen – Alexandra
- Love Dance Merengue – Manny Cruz
- El Papá de la Bachata, Su Legado (Añoñado I, II, III, IV) – Luis Segura
- Insensatez – Fernando Villalona

Best Traditional Tropical Album

Cha Cha Chá: Homenaje a lo Tradicional – Alain Pérez, Issac Delgado and Orquesta Aragón

- Gente con Alma – José Aguirre Cali Big Band
- Chabuco en La Habana – Chabuco
- Solos – Jon Secada & Gonzalo Rubalcaba
- Alma Cubana – Leoni Torres

Best Contemporany Tropical/Tropical Fusion Album

Brazil305 – Gloria Estefan

- Legendarios – Billos
- Río Abajo – Diana Burco
- Acertijos – Pedrito Martínez
- La Música del Carnaval - XX Aniversario – Juventino Ojito y Su Son Mocaná

Best Tropical Song

"Dios Así lo Quiso" – Ricardo Montaner & Juan Luis Guerra

Camilo, David Julca, Jonathan Julca, Yasmil Marrufo & Ricardo Montaner, songwriters

- "Bolero a la Vida" – Omara Portuondo featuring Gaby Moreno
  - Santiago Larramendi & Gaby Moreno, songwriters
- "Más Feliz Que Ayer" – Chabuco
  - Alfredo Nodarse, songwriter
- "Pambiche de Novia" – Juan Luis Guerra
  - Juan Luis Guerra, songwriter
- "Un Suemo Increíble (Homenaje a Jairo Varela)" – Dayhan Díaz and Charlie Cardona
  - Jorge Luis Piloto, songwriter

=== Songwriter ===
Best Singer-Songwriter Album

SEIS – Mon Laferte

- Alemorología – AleMor
- Mendó – Alex Cuba
- Mañana Te Escribo Otra Canción – Covi Quintana
- El Árbol y el Bosque – Rozalén

=== Regional Mexican ===
Best Ranchero/Mariachi Album

A Mis 80's – Vicente Fernández

- Cuanto te Enamores – El Bebeto
- #CHARRAMILLENNIAL - LADY – Nora González
- AYAYAY! (SÚPER DELUXE) – Christian Nodal
- Soy México – Pike Romero

Best Banda Album

Nos Divertimos Logrando lo Imposible – Grupo Firme

- Concierto Mundial Digital Live – Banda El Recodo de Cruz Lizárraga
- Vivir la Vida – Banda Los Recoditos
- Sin Miedo al Éxito – Banda Los Sebastianes
- Llegando al Rancho – Joss Favela

Best Tejano Album

Pa' la Pista y Pa'l Pisto, Vol. 2 – El Plan

- Back on Track – Ram Herrera
- Histórico – La Fiebre
- Incomparable – Sólido
- Un Beso es Suficiente – Vilax

Best Norteño Album

Al Estilo Rancherón – Los Dos Carnales (tie)

Volando Alto – Palomo (tie)

- Vamos Bien – Calibre 50
- De Vieja Escuela – Gera Demara
- Diez – La Energía Norteña
- Recordando a una Leyenda – Los Plebes del Rancho de Ariel Camacho, Christian Nodal

Best Regional Song

"Aquí Abajo" – Christian Nodal

Edgar Barrera, René Humberto Lau Ibarra, Johan Arjona & Christian Nodal, songwriters

- "Cicatrices" – Nora González with Lupita Infante
  - Pepe Portilla, songwriter
- "40 y 21" – Beto Zapata
  - Erika Vidrio, songwriter
- "Que Se Sepa Nuestro Amor" – Mon Laferte & Alejandro Fernández
  - El David Aguilar & Mon Laferte, songwriters
- "Tuyo y Mío" – Camilo & Los Dos Carnales
  - Édgar Barrera, Camilo & Alfonso de Jesús Quezada Mancha, songwriters

=== Instrumental ===
Best Instrumental Album

Toquinho e Yamandu Costa - Bachianinha (Live at Rio Montreaux Jazz Festival) – Toquinho and Yamandu Costa

- Entretiempo y Tiempo – Omar Acosta and Sergio Menem
- Cristovão Bastos e Rogério Caetano – Cristovão Bastos and Rogério Caetano
- Canto da Praya - Ao Vivo – Hamilton de Holanda and Mestrinho
- Le Petit Garage (Live) – Ara Malikian

=== Traditional ===
Best Folk Album

Ancestras – Petrona Martínez

- Amor Pasado – Leonel García
- Jemas – Tato Marenco
- Renacer – Nahuel Pennisi
- Vocal – Alejandro Zavala

Best Tango Album

Tinto Tango Plays Piazzolla – Tinto Tango

- Tango of the Americas – Pan American Symphony Orchestra
- 348 – Federico Pereiro
- 100 Años – Quinteto Revolucionario
- Tanghetto Plays Piazzolla – Tanghetto

Best Flamenco Album

Un Nuevo Universo – Pepe de Lucía

- Alma de Pura Raza – Paco Candela
- Amor – Israel Fernández & Diego Del Morao
- Herencia – Rafael Riqueni
- El Rey – María Toledo

=== Jazz ===
Best Latin Jazz/Jazz Album

Voyager – Iván Melon Lewis

- Bruma: Celebrating Milton Nascimiento – Antonio Adolfo
- Ontology – Roxana Amed
- Family – Edmar Castañeda
- El Arte del Bolero – Miguel Zenón & Luis Perdomo

=== Christian ===
Best Christian Album (Spanish Language)

Ya Me Vi – Aroddy

- Hora Dorada – Anagrace
- Redención – Aline Barros
- Vida Encontré – Majo y Dan
- Milagro de Amar – William Perdomo

Best Christian Album (Portuguese Language)

Seguir Teu Coração – Anderson Freire

- Catarse: Lado B – Daniela Araújo
- Sarah Farias (Ao Vivo) – Sarah Farias
- Sentido – Leonardo Gonçalves
- Eli Soares 10 Anos – Eli Soares

=== Portuguese Language ===
Best Portuguese Language Contemporary Pop Album

Cor – Anavitória

- A Bolha – Vitor Kley
- Duda Beat & Nando Reis – Nando Reis & Duda Beat
- Será que Você Vai Acreditar? – Fernanda Takai
- Chegamos Sozinhos em Casa Vol1 – Tuyo

Best Portuguese Language Rock or Alternative Album

Álbum Rosa – A Cor do Som

- Emidoinã – André Abujamra
- OxeAxeExu – BaianaSystem
- Assim Tocam Meus Tambores – Marcelo D2
- Fôlego – Scalene
- O Bar Me Chama – Velhas Virgens

Best Samba/Pagode Album

Sempre Se Pode Sonhar – Paulinho da Viola

- Rio: Só Vendo a Vista – Martinho da Vila
- Nei Lopes, Projeto Coisa Fina e Guga Stroeter no Pagode Black Tie – Nei Lopes, Projeto Coisa Fina and Guga Stroeter
- Samba de Verão – Diogo Nogueira
- Onze (Músicas Inéditas de Adoniran Barbosa) (Vários Artistas) – Lucas Mayer, producer

Best MPB (Musica Popular Brasileira) Album

Canções D'Além Mar – Zeca Baleiro

- H.O.J.E – Delia Fischer
- Tempo de Viver – Thiago Holanda
- Bom Mesmo É Estar Debaixo D'Água – Luedji Luna
- Do Meu Coração Nu – Zé Manoel

Best Sertaneja Music Album

Tempo de Romance – Chitãozinho & Xororó

- Daniel em Casa – Daniel
- Patroas – Marília Mendonça, Maiara & Maraísa
- Conquistas – Os Barões da Pisadinha
- Pra Ouvir no Fone – Michel Teló

Best Portuguese Language Roots Album

Arraía da Veveta – Ivete Sangalo

- Sambadeiras – Luiz Caldas
- Do Coração – Sara Correia
- Orin a Língua dos Anjos – Orquestra Afrosinfônica; André Magalhães & Ubiratan Marques, album producers
- Eu e Vocês – Elba Ramalho

Best Portuguese Language Song

"Lisboa" – Anavitória and Lenine

Ana Caetano & Paulo Novaes, songwriters

- "A Cidade" – Chico Chico and João Mantuano
  - Jõão Pedro de Araújo Silva, Pedro Fonseca da Costa Silva, Marcos Mesmo, Francisco Ribeiro Eller, Luiz Ungarelli & Lucas Videla, songwriters
- "Amores e Flores" – Melim
  - Diogo Melim & Rodrigo Melim, songwriters
- "Espera a Primavera" – Nando Reis
  - Nando Reis, songwriter
- "Lágrimas de Alegria" – Maneva & Natiruts
  - Tales De Polli & Deko, songwriters
- "Mulheres Não Têm Que Chorar" – Ivete Sangalo & Emicida
  - Tiê Castro, Emicida & Guga Fernandes, songwriters

=== Children's ===
Best Latin Children’s Album

Tu Rockcito Filármonico – Tu Rockcito and Orquesta Filarmónica de Medellín

- Otra Vuelta al Sol – Cantoalegre; Edith Derdyk, Daniel Escobar, Luis Fernando Franco, Jesús David Garcés, Fito Hernández, Paulo Tatit & José Julián Villa, album producers
- Danilo & Chapis, Vol. 1 – Danilo & Chapis
- Canciones de Cuna – Mi Casa Es Tu Casa
- Nanas Consentidoras – Victoria Sur

=== Classical ===
Best Classical Album

Latin American Classics – Kristhyan Benitez

Jon Feidner, album producer

- Beethoven: Révolution, Symphonies 1 à 5 – Jordi Savall & Le Concert des Nations
  - Jordi Savall, conductor; Manuel Mohino, album producer
- Claudio Santoro: A Obra Integral Para Violoncelo e Piano – Ney Fialkow & Hugo Pilger
  - Maria de Fátima Nunes Pilger & Hugo Pilger, album producers
- Music from Cuba and Spain, Sierra: Sonata para Guitarra – Manuel Barrueco
  - Asgerdur Sigurdardottir, album producer
- Tres Historias Concertantes – Héctor Infanzón
  - Konstantin Dobroykov, conductor; Héctor Infanzón, album producer

Best Classical Contemporary Composition

"Music from Cuba and Spain, Sierra: Sonata para Guitarra" – Manuel Barrueco

Roberto Sierra, composer

- "Concierto para Violín y Orquesta-Remembranzas" – Héctor Infanzón & William Harvey
  - Héctor Infanzón, composer
- "Cuatro" – Orlando Jacinto Garcia featuring Amernet String Quartet
  - Orlando Jacinto García, composer
- "Desde la Tierra que Habito" – Ensamble Contemporáneo Universitario (ECU) & Banda de Conciertos de Cartago (BCC)
  - Eddie Mora, composer
- "Falling Out of Time" – Osvaldo Golijov
  - Osvaldo Golijov, composer

=== Arrangement ===
Best Arrangement

"Ojalá que Llueva Café (Versión Privé)" – Juan Luis Guerra

Juan Luis Guerra, arranger

- "Blue in Green (Sky and Sea)" – Roxana Amed
  - Kendall Moore, arranger
- "Tierra Mestiza" – America Viva Band
  - César Orozco, arranger
- "Adiós Nonino" – Jorge Calandrelli
  - Jorge Calandrelli, arranger
- "Um Beijo" – Melody Gardot
  - Vince Mendoza, arranger

=== Recording Package ===
Best Recording Package

Colegas – Gilberto Santa Rosa

Ana Gonzalez, art director

- Lo Que Me Dé La Gana – Dani Martín
  - Boa Mistura, art director
- Madrid Nuclear – Leiva
  - Emilio Lorente, art director
- Puta – Zahara
  - Emilio Lorente, art director
- Tragas o Escupes – Jarabe de Palo
  - Marc Donés, art director

=== Production ===
Best Engineered Album

El Madrileño – C. Tangana

Orlando Aispuro Meneses, Daniel Alanís, Alizzz, Rafa Arcaute, Josdán Luis Cohimbra Acosta, Miguel De La Vega, Máximo Espinosa Rosell, Alex Ferrer, Luis Garcié, Billy Garedella, Patrick Liotard, Ed Maverick, Beto Mendonça, Jaime Navarro, Alberto Pérez, Nathan Phillips, Harto Rodríguez & Federico Vindver, engineers; Delbert Bowers, Alex Ferrer, Jaycen Joshua, Nineteen85, Lewis Pickett, Alex Psaroudakis & Raül Refree, mixers; Chris Athens, mastering engineer

- bpm – Salvador Sobral
  - Nelson Carvalho, engineer; Leo Aldrey & Rafael Giner, mixers; Tiago De Sousa, mastering engineer
- Bruma: Celebrating Milton Nascimiento – Antonio Adolfo
  - Roger Freret, engineer; Claudio Spiewak, mixer; André Dias, mastering engineer
- Iceberg – Priscila Tossan
  - Mauro Araújo, engineer; Andre Kassin, mixer; Carlos Freitas, mastering engineer
- Un Canto por México, Vol. 2 – Natalia Lafourcade
  - Pepe Aguilar, Rodrigo Cuevas, José Luis Fernández, Camilo Froideval, Edson R. Heredia, Manu Jalil, Rubén López Arista, Nacho Molino, David Montuy, Lucas Nunes, Alan Ortiz Grande & Alan Saucedo, engineers; Rubén López Arista, mixer; Michael Fuller, mastering engineer

Producer of the Year

Edgar Barrera

- **"Botella tras botella" (Christian Nodal & Gera MX) (S)**
- **"100 Años" (Carlos Rivera & Maluma) (S)**
- **"De Vuelta Pa' la Vuelta" (Daddy Yankee & Marc Anthony) (S)**
- **Mis Manos (Camilo) (A)**
- **"Pa Ti" (Jennifer Lopez & Maluma) (S)**
- **"Poco" (Reik & Christian Nodal) (S)**
- **#7DJ (7 Días en Jamaica) (Maluma) (A)**
- **"Vida de Rico" (Camilo) (S)**

- Alizzz
  - El Madrileño (C. Tangana) (A)
- Bizarrap
  - "Zaramay: Bzrp Music Sessions, Vol. 31" (Bizarrap & Zaramay) (S)
  - "Cazzu: Bzrp Music Sessions, Vol. 32" (Bizarrap & Cazzu) (S)
  - "Khea: Bzrp Music Sessions, Vol. 34" (Bizarrap & Khea) (S)
  - "Nathy Peluso: Bzrp Music Sessions, Vol. 36" (Bizarrap & Nathy Peluso) (S)
  - "Ysy A: Bzrp Music Sessions, Vol. 37" (Bizarrap & Ysy A) (S)
  - "L-Gante: Bzrp Music Sessions, Vol. 38" (Bizarrap & L-Gante) (S)
- Marcos Sánchez
  - Amor y Punto (Manolo Ramos) (A)
- Dan Warner
  - Blanco (Tracks: 1, 2, 4, 6, 10, 11 & 14) (Ricardo Arjona) (A)

=== Music video ===
Best Short Form Music Video

"Un Amor Eterno" – Marc Anthony

Carlos R. Pérez, video director; Maricel Zambrano, video producer

- "Reza Forte" – BaianaSystem featuring BNegão
  - Belle De Melo, video director; Marcelo Cintra, video producer
- "Mi Huella" – Fuel Fandango featuring María José Llergo
  - Alex Gargot, video director; Alberto Tortes Catelló, video producer
- "Visceral" – Fran, Carlos Do Complexo & Bibi Caetano
  - Pedro Alvarenga, video director; Marcos Araújo & Bernardo Portella, video producers
- "De Una Vez" – Selena Gomez
  - Los Perez, video director; Kim Dellara & Clark Jackson, video producers

Best Long Form Music Video

Entre Mar y Palmeras – Juan Luis Guerra

Jean Guerra, video director; Nelson Albareda, Amarilys Germán, Jean Guerra & Edgar Martínez, video producers

- Un Segundo MTV Unplugged – Café Tacvba
  - Miguel Roldán, video director; Antonio Contreras Moya, video producer
- Mulher – Carolina Deslandes
  - Filipe Correia Dos Santos, video director; Pedro Caldeirão, video producer
- Origen (Documental) – Juanes
  - Kacho López Mari, video director; María Tristana Robles Reyes, video producer
- Quien Me Tañe Escucha Mis Voces (Documental) – Gastón Lafourcade
  - Bruno Bancalari, video director; Natalia Lafourcade & Juan Pablo López Fonseca, video producers

=== Special awards ===
Person of the Year

- **Rubén Blades**

Lifetime Achievement Award

- **Martinho da Vila**
- **Emmanuel**
- **Pete Escovedo**
- **Sheila E.**
- **Fito Páez**
- **Milly Quezada**
- **Joaquín Sabina**
- **Gilberto Santa Rosa**

Trustees Award

- **Guillermo "Memo" Acosta**
- **Egidio Cuadrado**
