= Grasa (album) =

2024 studio album by Nathy Peluso

Studio album by Nathy Peluso
- Released: May 24, 2024
- Genre: Latin hip-hop; Latin pop; Salsa; Latin trap
- Length: 42:43
- Language: Spanish
- Label: Sony Latin; 5020
- Producer: Nathy Peluso; Manuel Lara; Pablopablo; Benjamin Alerhand; Didi Gutman; Devonté Hynes; Servando Primera; Yasmil Marrufo; Casta; Rafa Arcaute

Nathy Peluso chronology
Calambre (2020)	Grasa (2024)	Club Grasa (2024)

Singles from Grasa
- 1. "Aprender a Amar" Released: May 17, 2024

Grasa (Spanish: Grease, or in slang "tacky") is the second studio album by Argentine-Spanish singer Nathy Peluso, released on May 24, 2024, through Sony Music Latin and 5020 Records. It was produced by Nathy Peluso herself, alongside Manuel Lara, pablopablo, Benjamin Alerhand, Didi Gutman, Devonté Hynes, Servando Primera, Yasmil Marrufo, Casta and Rafa Arcaute; and features collaborations with Duki, Lua de Santana, Ca7riel & Paco Amoroso, C. Tangana and Blood Orange.

The album was supported by the single "Aprender a Amar", released on May 17, 2024. Additionally, Grasa was released alongside an accompanying music film, directed by Agustín Landa.

== Background ==
In 2020, Peluso released her debut album, Calambre, to both critical and commercial success, peaking at number five at the Spanish Albums chart and being certified gold in the country. The album won the Latin Grammy Award for Best Alternative Music Album (Peluso's first Latin Grammy Award) and was nominated for the Grammy Award for Best Latin Rock or Alternative Album. Additionally, it won several awards at Argentina's Premios Gardel, including Best New Artist, Best Alternative Pop Album and Record of the Year, the latter for the song "Buenos Aires".

Between the release of her first and second album, Peluso released several singles and collaborations. In 2021, she released the certified-gold singles "Mafiosa" and "Vivir Así Es Morir de Amor", the latter a cover of the 1978 song by Spanish singer Camilo Sesto. Also that year, she released two highly commercially successful collaborations: "Ateo" with Spanish rapper C. Tangana and "Pa Mis Muchachas" with American singers Christina Aguilera and Becky G, and fellow Argentine rapper Nicki Nicole. The former collaboration debuted at the top of the Spanish Song chart while the latter peaked at number 37 at the Hot Latin Songs chart (Peluso's first appearance in the chart) and received nominations for Record of the Year, Song of the Year and Best Urban Fusion/Performance at the 23rd Annual Latin Grammy Awards. Both collaborations were certified gold in the United States.

In 2023, she released three more singles as a lead artist, the pop song "Tonta", the house-infused "Salvaje" and the bachata collaboration "Ella Tiene" with Argentine singer Tiago PZK. None of the singles were included in the album. In early May 2024, Peluso announced the album via her Instagram account, also releasing a video to YouTube where she appears in front of a billboard which shows the album title in red letters as well as the release date. The following week, she shared on her Instagram both the tracklist and the album cover, which features Peluso taking a topless selfie in the set of the music videos for the album.

== Composition ==
The album consists of 16 tracks, all composed and co-produced by Peluso herself in collaboration with Venezuelan producer Manuel Lara, with the exception of "No Les Creo Nada - Skit" with consists only of eighteen seconds of dialogue by C. Tangana. pablopablo, Benjamin Alerhand, Didi Gutman, Devonté Hynes, Servando Primera, Yasmil Marrufo, Casta and Rafa Arcaute, also appear as producers in the album. Similarly to her previous album, Grasa is an eclectic Latin rap album, with tracks that experiment with other genres such as salsa in "La Presa", 50s Italian ballads in "Corleone", pop in "Legendario", reggaeton in "Real", and trap in "Menina", "La Mentira" and "Todo Roto".

The album's title, meaning "grease" in Spanish, was chosen by Peluso due to the word's multiple meanings and associations to her. To Peluso, the word was "something rough, something strong", which was what she was looking for the album, though the word is also tied with childhood memories of their dad working at a gas station coming home with his hands and clothes with grease. Hence, the word became a "symbol for hard-working people" to Peluso. Additionally, the word in used in Argentina as slang for vulgar things.

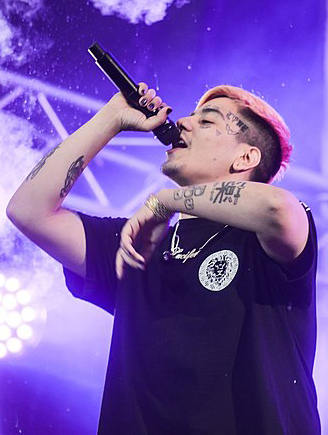
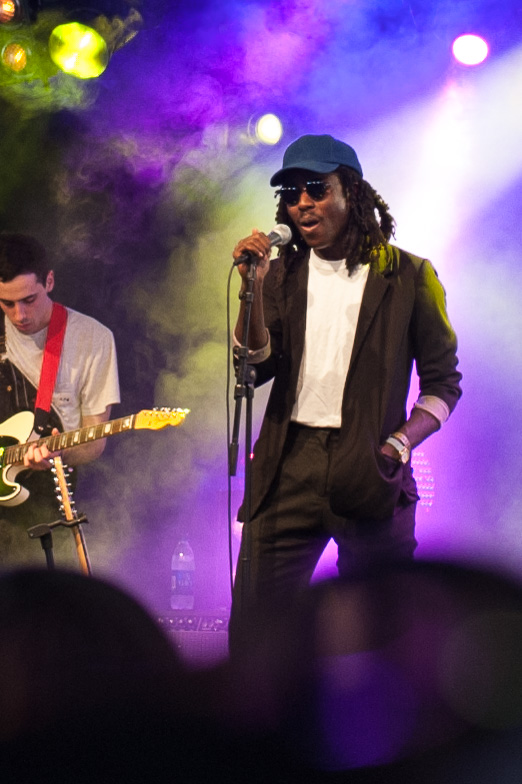
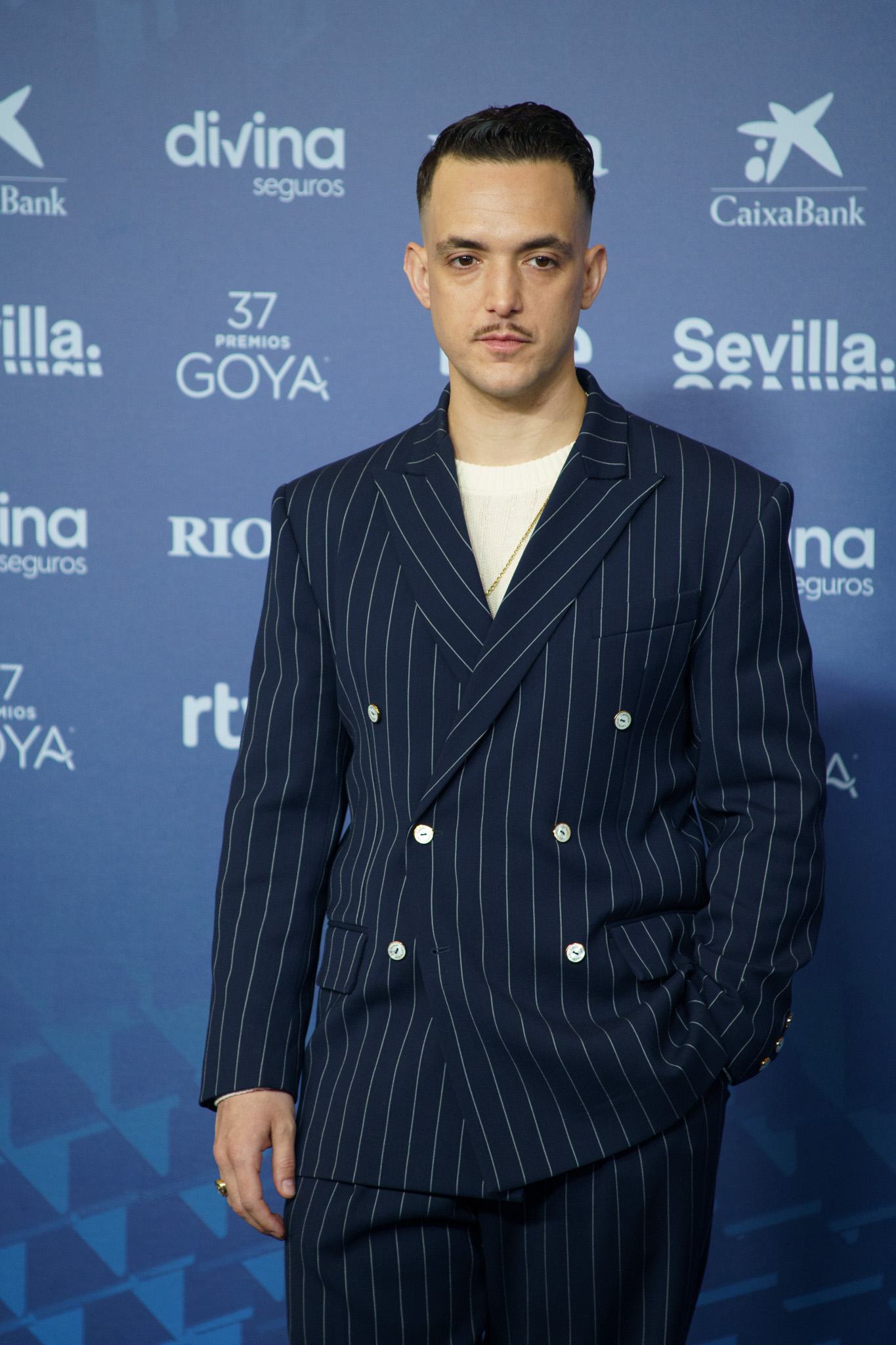
Argentine rapper Duki (left), Spanish rapper C. Tangana (right) and American singer and producer Blood Orange (center) appear in the tracks "Manhattan", "No Les Creo Nada - Skit" and "El Día Que Perdí Mi Juventud", respectively.

Described by media outlets as both her most theatrical album and her project with the most intimate and personal lyrics, the album showcases introspective lyrics about empowerment, love, her life decisions and sacrifices, and her relationship with fame and her career as an artist. Peluso has said that "there is a very important message in the album, which is learning to love oneself", this is discussed in tracks like "Aprender a Amar", described by her as a "mantra that I tell myself and the world". In other tracks such as "Envidia" and "Remedio", self-love in the face of hate and critics is discussed.

Difficulties with love are the subject in tracks like "Ideas Radicales" and "La Presa", with the latter being about killing a lover by depriving them of love. In the music video for "La Presa", Peluso is seen performing in a prison cell after being arrested for said crime. Peluso also sings about the sacrifices she's had to do to for her career in the songs "El Día Que Perdí Mi Juventud" and "Envidia", also talking about the loss of innocence that comes with growing up and the courage and discipline that is required to have a career in music.

Finally, some songs deal with Peluso's relationship with fame and success. In "Corleone", which references fictional mafia leader Vito Corleone, Peluso reflects on her place within the Latin urban music scene, in "Aprender a Amar", she talks about the privileges that artists have to generate conversations with their art, in "Manhattan", she jokes about dreaming with an apartment in Manhattan, and in "No Les Creo Nada - Skit", Spanish rapper C. Tangana makes a surprise appearance talking about the importance of connecting with audiences as an artist.

== Promotion ==
The album was supported by the single "Aprender a Amar", released on May 17, 2024. The album was accompanied by a music film uploaded to Peluso's YouTube account, consisting on music videos for every song in the album, all directed by Agustín Puente and produced by The Movement by Landia. The film was shot in a "theatre-like" set of an apartment, decorated with white walls, red and black furniture, and a bright blue carpet. It also features scenes of Peluso in a jail cell. The film shows Peluso posing and singing in an apartment while policemen investigate the rooms and later arrest her.

To promote the album, Peluso made different appearances in various countries. In Spain, she appeared in the television talk shows El Hormiguero, where she sang a portion of "Envidia", and La Resistencia. In New York City, she appeared at Prince Street Pizza where she offered pizza slices and teased the name of the album by shouting "¿Quién quiere grasa?" (¿who wants grease?). Lastly, in her native Argentina, she hosted a private listening party where several Argentine personalities attended, including Emilia, Nicki Nicole, Úrsula Corberó, Duki, Paco Amoroso and Ca7riel, among others.

=== Tour ===
On October 27, 2024, Peluso embarked on a 36 dates tour across Europe, the United States, and Latin America.

== Critical reception ==
Professional ratings
Review scores
Source	Rating
Beats per Minute	79/100
The Guardian	4/5 stars

Writing for British newspaper The Guardian, Alim Kheraj gave the album four out of five stars, writing that in the project, Peluso "moves between snarling bombast, acoustic yearning and lavish salsa in her eclectic second album". He concluded his review by praising the album's scope and execution.

== Track listing ==
Grasa track listing
No.	Title	Lyrics	Music	Producer(s)	Length
1.	"Corleone"	Nathy Peluso	Peluso; Benjamin Alerhand; Manuel Lara	Peluso; M. Lara	2:28
2.	"Aprender a Amar"	Peluso	Peluso; Alberto Escámez López; Pablo Drexler	Peluso; Pablopablo	1:39
3.	"Real"	Peluso	Peluso; Alerhand; M. Lara	Peluso; M. Lara	2:59
4.	"Legendario"	Peluso; Manuel Lorente Freire	Peluso; Alerhand; M. Lara	Peluso; M. Lara	3:04
5.	"Escaleras de Metal"	Peluso	Peluso; Alerhand; M. Lara	Peluso; Alerhand; M. Lara	1:47
6.	"Todo Roto" (with Ca7riel & Paco Amoroso)	Peluso; Catriel Guerreiro; Ulises Guerriero	Peluso; Alerhand; M. Lara	Peluso; M. Lara	3:07
7.	"No Les Creo Nada - Skit" (with C. Tangana)	Antón Álvarez Alfaro	Álvarez Alfaro		0:18
8.	"Envidia"	Peluso; Lorente Freire	Peluso; Alerhand; M. Lara	Peluso; Alerhand; M. Lara	2:35
9.	"Menina" (with Lua de Santana)	Peluso; Lua de Santana; Lorente Freire	Peluso; Alerhand; M. Lara	Peluso; M. Lara	2:08
10.	"Ideas Radicales"	Peluso	Peluso; Alerhand; M. Lara	Peluso; M. Lara	3:00
11.	"Manhattan" (with Duki)	Peluso; Mauro Ezequiel Lombardo	Peluso; Didi Gutman	Peluso; Gutman; Zecca	3:12
12.	"El Día Que Perdí Mi Juventud" (with Blood Orange)	Peluso	Peluso; Devonté Hynes	Peluso; Hynes	2:48
13.	"La Presa"	Peluso	Peluso; M. Lara; Yasmil Marrufo; Servando Primera	Peluso; M. Lara; Marrufo; Primera	3:36
14.	"La Mentira"	Peluso	Peluso; Luis Miguel Gómez Castaño; Félix Lara	Peluso; Casta	3:14
15.	"Remedio"	Peluso	Peluso; Rafa Arcaute; Gutman	Peluso; Arcaute	3:15
16.	"Mamá"	Peluso	Peluso; Gutman	Peluso; Gutman; M. Lara	3:27
Total length:					42:43

=== Notes ===
- All tracks are stylized in all caps.

== Personnel ==
Musicians

- Nathy Peluso – lead vocals
- Ben Aler – piano (tracks 1, 3, 4, 6, 8, 10), strings (5), synthesizer (9)
- Manuel Lara – programming (tracks 1, 3, 4, 6, 9, 10, 16)
- Rodner Padilla – bass (track 1)
- Eric Chacón – flute (track 1)
- Joel Martinez – trombone (track 1)
- Félix Lara – synth bass (track 3)
- Ca7riel – vocals (track 6)
- Paco Amoroso – vocals (track 6)
- Lua de Santana – vocals (track 9)
- Didi Gutman – programming (track 11), synthesizer (16)
- Zecca – programming (track 11)
- Duki – vocals (track 11)
- Devonté Hynes – guitar (track 12)
- Henry Santiago – background vocals (track 13)
- Jerry Rivas – background vocals (track 13)
- Luisito Carrión – background vocals (track 13)
- Servando Primera – background vocals (track 13)
- Yasmil Marrufo – strings (track 13)
- Anderson Quintero – timbales (track 13)
- Domingo Pagliuca – trombone (track 13)
- Roinel Vega – trumpet (track 13)
- Casta – programming (track 14)
- Guillermo Vadalá – bass (track 15)
- Francisco Alducin – drums (track 15)
- Ezequiel Cantero – guitar (track 15)
- Martin Allende – guitar (track 15)
- Richard Bravo – percussion (track 15)
- Rafa Arcaute – programming (track 15)

Technical

- Prash "Engine Earz" Mistry – mastering, mixing
- Dani Val – engineering (tracks 1, 3–6, 8–10, 12, 13, 16)
- Manuel Lara – engineering (tracks 1, 3–6, 8–10, 13, 16)
- Carlos Imperatori – engineering (tracks 1, 10)
- Roger Rodés – engineering (tracks 1, 11, 14–16)
- Pablo Drexler – engineering (track 2)
- Camilo Zea – engineering (tracks 3, 6, 10, 13–15)
- Felipe Bernal – engineering (tracks 3, 6, 10, 13–15)
- Felipe Trujillo – engineering (tracks 3, 6, 10, 13–15)
- Ramses Ascanio – engineering (tracks 3, 6, 10, 13–15)
- Augusto Flores – engineering (track 6)
- Carlos Pizzi – engineering (track 6)
- Manuel Gattoni – engineering (track 6)
- Mateo Rodó – engineering (track 6)
- Jorge Rodríguez – engineering (track 9)
- Didi Gutman – engineering (tracks 11, 15, 16)
- Darren Jones – engineering (track 12)
- Angel Torres – engineering (track 13)
- Daniel Márquez – engineering (track 13)
- Rafa Arcaute – engineering (track 15)

== Charts ==
Weekly chart performance for Grasa
Chart (2024)	Peak position
Spanish Albums (Promusicae)	9

== Club Grasa ==
Club Grasa

EP / remix album by Nathy Peluso
- Released: September 12, 2024
- Genre: Electronic dance music
- Length: 25:22
- Label: Sony Latin; 5020

Nathy Peluso chronology
Grasa (2024)	Club Grasa (2024)

Club Grasa is an extended play (EP) by Nathy Peluso that features remixes of eight songs from Grasa. It was released on September 12, 2024, through Sony Music Latin and 5020 Records. Club Grasa marked Peluso's first remix project. The EP contains sounds of electronic dance music, with rap, salsa, and soul elements. Nusar3000, Mura Masa, Tristán!, Tayhana, Garoto 3000, Phoac, Merca Bae, and CRRDR appear on the EP as the remixers.

In a press release while releasing the project, Peluso said: "This whole process has been an experiment and a super fun journey for me. I've handed over my music to producers from the international clubbing scene, giving them total freedom to reinterpret it from its core".

=== Track listing ===
Club Grasa track listing
No.	Title	Writer(s)	Producer(s)	Length
1.	"Real" (Nusar3000 remix)	Nathy Peluso; Benjamin Alerhand; Manuel Lara; Nusar3000	Peluso; Nusar3000; M. Lara	2:30
2.	"Menina" (Mura Masa remix; with Lua de Santana)	Peluso; Alerhand; Lua de Santana; M. Lara; Manuel Lorente Freire; Mura Masa	Peluso; Mura Masa; M. Lara	3:00
3.	"Corleone" (Tristán! remix)	Peluso; Alerhand; M. Lara	Peluso; Tristán; M. Lara	3:02
4.	"Aprender a Amar" (Tayhana remix)	Peluso; Alberto Escamez Lopez; Pablo Drexler; Tayhana	Peluso; Tayhana; Pablopablo	4:34
5.	"Manhattan" (Garoto 3000 remix; with Duki)	Peluso; Didi Gutman; Duki	Peluso; Garoto 3000; Gutman; Zecca	3:22
6.	"Ideas Radicales" (Phoac remix)	Peluso; Alerhand; M. Lara; Pau Vehí; Álvaro Gutiérrez	Peluso; Phoac; Gutiérrez; Gutman; Zecca	3:04
7.	"La Presa" (Merca Bae remix)	Peluso; M. Lara; Servando Primera; Yasmil Marrufo	Peluso; Merca Bae; M. Lara; Marrufo; Servando Primera	2:50
8.	"Todo Roto" (CRRDR remix; with Ca7riel & Paco Amoroso)	Peluso; Alerhand; Catriel Guerreiro; M. Lara; Ulises Guerreiro	Peluso; CRRDR; M. Lara	2:56
Total length:				25:22
