= Nathy Peluso =

Argentine Spanish singer-songwriter (born 1995)

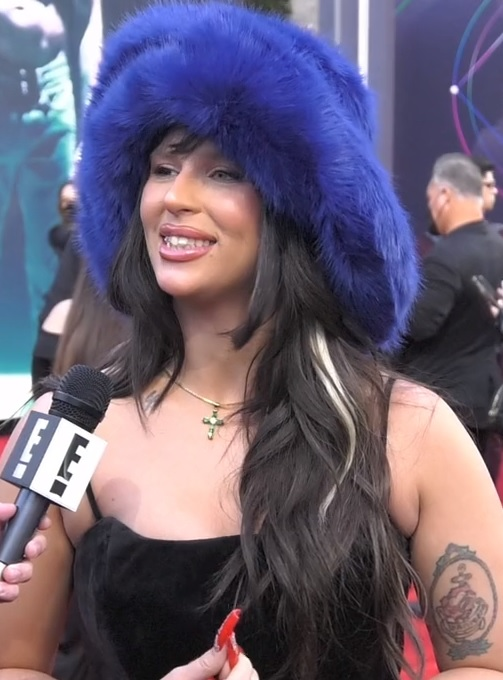
- Peluso in 2021
- Born: Natalia Peluso; 12 January 1995 (age 31); Luján, Buenos Aires, Argentina
- Citizenship: Argentina; Spain; Italy
- Education: King Juan Carlos University
- Occupation: Singer-songwriter
- Years active: 2017–present
- Works: Discography
- Musical career
- Origin: Alicante, Spain
- Genres: Latin pop; Latin alternative; hip-hop; neo soul; Latin R&B
- Labels: Sony Spain; Everlasting
- Website: nathypeluso.com

Natalia "Nathy" Peluso (Spanish: [ˌnati peˈluso]; born 12 January 1995) is an Argentine Spanish singer-songwriter.

Born in Argentina and raised in Alicante, Spain, Peluso became interested in the performing arts at an early age, performing cover songs at musical bars in her teenage years in Torrevieja. After graduating from King Juan Carlos University, Peluso relocated to Barcelona to pursue a professional career in music, with her first releases Esmeralda (2017) and La Sandunguera (2018) being confected independently. Peluso slowly started to become recognized in Spain. After signing to Sony Music Spain, she started working on her breakthrough album Calambre (2020) for which she won the Latin Grammy Award for Best Alternative Music Album in 2021. Her second studio album, Grasa, was released in 2024.

Distinguished for her theatrical personality onstage, and her fusion of hip-hop, soul, and world music, Peluso's popularity expanded after collaborating with Bizarrap on "Bzrp Music Sessions, Vol. 36" (2020), achieving commercial success and social media traction in Latin America. She has also collaborated with Christina Aguilera, Karol G, and C. Tangana, with the latter one's duet "Ateo" debuting atop the Spanish charts.

Peluso's artistry has been awarded six Premios Gardel, one Premio Odeón and five Latin Grammys out of fourteen nominations, including Best New Artist, among many others.

== Early life ==
Natalia Peluso was born on 12 January 1995, in Luján, Argentina. She is the first daughter of Hernán Peluso, a psychologist, and Laura Raquel Melano, an English-language teacher and children books writer. Her younger sister named Sofía is a rapper, who performs using the stage name Sofía Gabanna. Peluso has Italian ancestry. After living shortly in Luján, her mother's hometown, she was raised in the Saavedra neighborhood in Buenos Aires. While growing up she listened to a variety of artists like Ella Fitzgerald and Ray Charles, as well as artists such as João Gilberto, Ray Barretto, or Atahualpa Yupanqui. Peluso said that she was nicknamed "Nati" when growing up but later changed it to "Nathy" for her musical career.

In 2004, at the age of nine Peluso immigrated to Spain with her family due to the Argentine great depression. She first resided in Alicante. She practiced rhythmic gymnastics for nine years as a child, though she stopped due to negative comments from teachers about her weight. At the age of 16, she began to perform at hotels and restaurants in Torrevieja, mainly performing classic songs by Frank Sinatra, Etta James and Nina Simone. As a teenager, she began uploading versions to her YouTube channel. She moved to Murcia shortly after, where she entered the city's local university to study for a degree in audiovisual communication. After leaving the degree program, she moved to Madrid to study fine arts at the King Juan Carlos University. She specialized in the pedagogy of visual arts and dance. While studying, she worked in the hospitality industry as a waitress at VIPS and Domino's Pizza, among others. After leaving her studies, she moved to Barcelona, where she currently resides. Additionally, she also wrote instant poetry as a source of income, which led to an interest in hip-hop music after meeting producers of the genre.

== Career ==
=== 2017–2018: Esmeralda and La Sandunguera ===
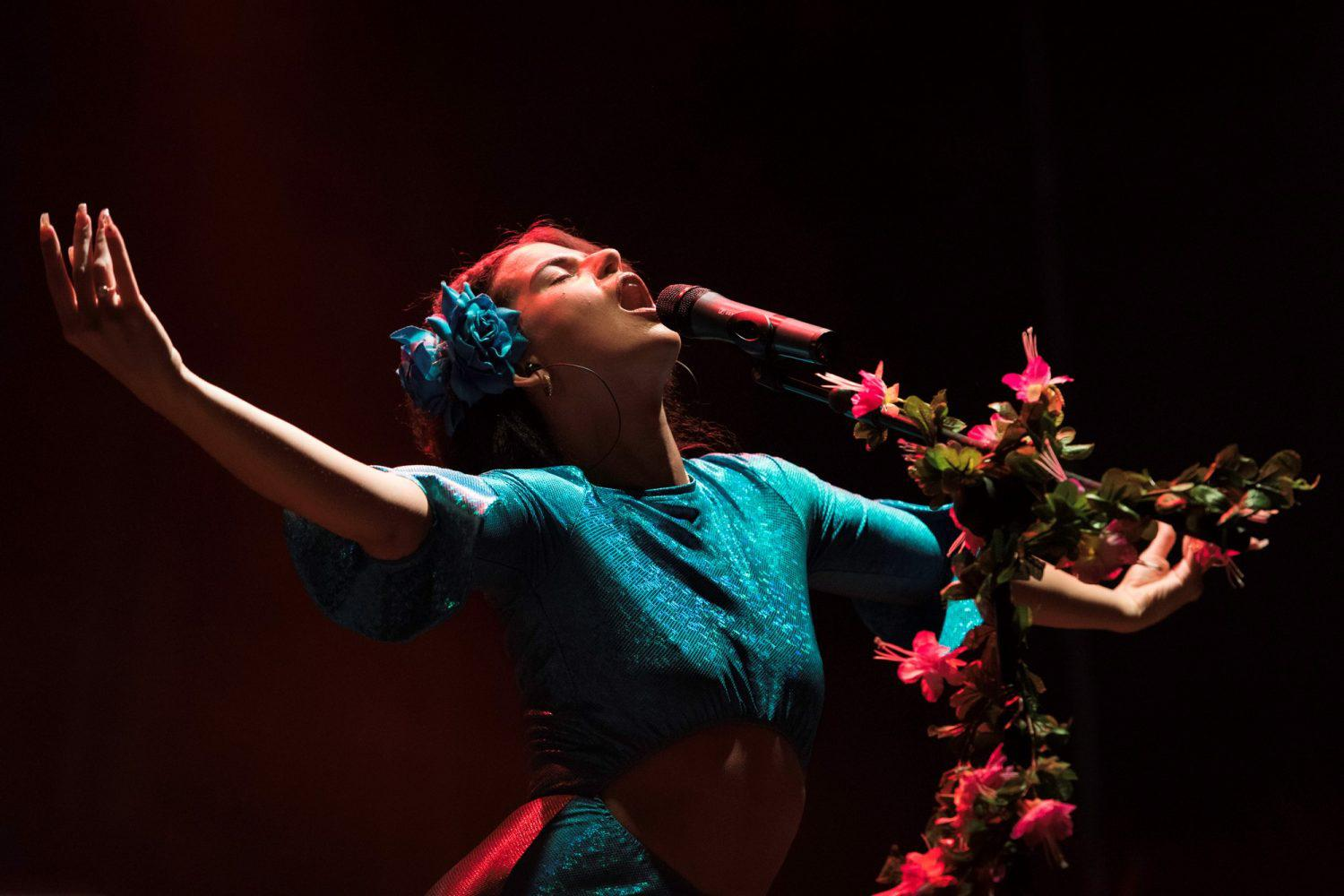
Peluso performing in Madrid in 2018

In October 2017, Peluso self-released a seven-track mixtape titled Esmeralda, which included her debut single "Corashe". The track aroused the interest of many music critics and independent music magazines like Mondo Sonoro and Rockdelux.

In April 2018, she released her first EP La Sandunguera through Everlasting Records, with the title track and "Estoy Triste" released as singles. She later embarked on a tour with her band Big Menu that had over a hundred concerts, including gigs at BBK Live, Sónar and the Festival Internacional de Benicàssim. The tour visited Spain and selected parts of Europe and Latin America. She was nominated at the Independent Music Awards (MIN) for Song of the Year and Best Music Video for "La Sandunguera" She also received the Discovery Artist award at the Latin Alternative Music Conference in New York City.

Peluso published the book Deja Que te Combata in May 2019, a compilation of her thoughts, reflections, stories, and past and upcoming projects. During that year she continued promoting herself through new releases like "Natikillah" and appearances at major festivals such as Primavera Sound. She also partnered with Samsung to be part of their Somos Smart Girl campaign alongside Blanca Suárez, Sandra Barneda and Carolina Marín.

=== 2019–2023: Calambre ===
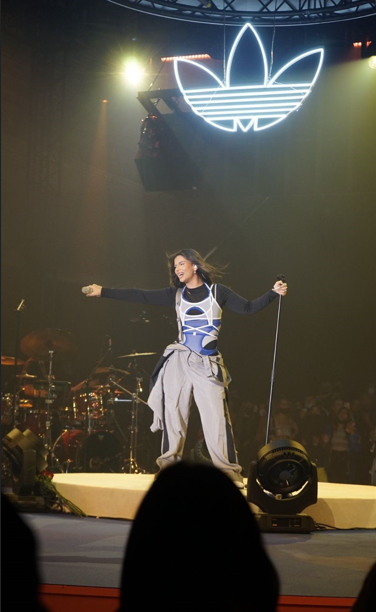
Nathy Peluso performing at Sala MEEU in Madrid

In December 2019, Peluso signed a record deal with Sony Music Spain. Later, she released "Copa Glasé" as her first release with the label, a Christmas song influenced by big band jazz.

In 2020, Peluso reached the attention of the general public and the mainstream audience after Operación Triunfo contestant Anaju sang "La Sandunguera" on prime time to keep participating in the show. After that, Peluso was invited to the show on Women's Day to promote her new single "Business Woman", defined as a feminist anthem. During the peak of the COVID-19 pandemic, Peluso released a musical collaboration with urbano artist Rels B titled "No Se Perdona", which had great commercial success. Another single "Buenos Aires" was released shortly after. It received critical acclaim for its message and sound and scored a Latin Grammy nomination for Best Alternative Song. She also received a Premio Gardel and a Latin Grammy nomination for Best New Artist. She was also covered in The Guardian for the first time.

In September 2020 she announced that she would be releasing her debut studio album Calambre on 2 October and released a new single "Sana Sana". Briefly before releasing her album, her performance of "Sana Sana" at the German music platform Colors "which features exceptional talent from around the world" went viral on Twitter, reaching over twelve million views. Calambre was released to critical and commercial success, peaking at number five on the PROMUSICAE album chart. The album was later nominated for Album of the Year at the Premios Gardel (the Argentine equivalent to the Grammy Awards) as well as for Best Alternative Pop Album. Its single "Buenos Aires" also received a nomination for Record of the Year. In November she collaborated with Argentine producer Bizarrap in "Bzrp Music Sessions Vol. 36", which eventually became viral due to its lyrics and instrumentation, reaching the top 5 on the Argentina Hot 100. It is certified platinum in Spain. The rap session received three Premios Gardel nominations, one of them being Song of the Year.

In 2021, the music video for her next single "Delito", directed by Agustín Puente, met praise from critics. The song became a top 30 hit both in Argentina and Spain and was certified Gold in the latter one. Later in March, she received critical acclaim for her performance of "La Violetera" at the 35th Goya Awards. That same month, she collaborated with Karol G on "Gato Malo", included in the Colombian's third studio album and sparked rumors about a possible future collaboration with J Balvin. In May, the singer embarked on her first major tour in Spain, which lasted until fall comprising 28 concerts. On 3 July 2021, Nathy Peluso announced her first solo single since the release of her debut album, titled "Mafiosa", which peaked at 89 in Spain. In September, she took part in the Spotify Singles song series in which she covered "La Despedida" by Daddy Yankee to critical acclaim. The following month, she collaborated with C. Tangana on his song "Ateo" (which became Peluso's first number one single in Spain) and was featured on Christina Aguilera's "Pa Mis Muchachas" alongside Becky G and Nicki Nicole. In December, Peluso reinterpreted Camilo Sesto's "Vivir Así es Morir de Amor" to great commercial success.

In February 2022, Peluso released "Emergencia" in collaboration with PlayStation. The single was inspired by the game Horizon Forbidden West. In the video clip, Peluso takes on the aesthetics of Aloy, the video game's main character. "Emergencia" was produced by Didi Gutman and ODDLIQUOR, while its music video was directed by The Movement.

=== 2024–present: Grasa and world tour ===
In early May 2024, following the release of standalone singles in 2023, Peluso announced her second studio album, titled Grasa, via her official social media, also releasing a video where she appears in front of a billboard which shows the album title in red letters as well as the release date. The following week, she shared on her Instagram account its tracklist and the album cover artwork.

In June 2024, Peluso announced a GRASA world tour in support of her album. The tour included her first headlining performances in the United States, with stops in major cities such as Miami, New York City, and Los Angeles, alongside a sold-out show in Milan and additional dates across Europe and South America.

In March 2025, Peluso released the single "Erotika," a tribute to the 1990s salsa erotica scene in New York City. In May 2025, she released the collaborative track "Perfecto Final" alongside Conociendo Rusia. In September 2025, Peluso teamed up with Mexican-Chilean singer Mon Laferte to release the single "La Tirana".

== Artistry ==
Peluso's music has been described as Latin pop, Latin alternative, hip-hop, neo soul, and Latin R&B.

== Personal life ==
Peluso said she believes in God, though not from a particular religion. She is a feminist, and has used her music to criticize misogyny in urban music. Peluso also advocates for body positivity.

== Discography ==
- Calambre (2020)
- Grasa (2024)

== Bibliography ==
- Deja Que Te Combata (2019)

== Tours ==
- La Sandungera Tour (2018)
- Calambre Tour (2021–2022)
- Grasa Tour (2024–2026)

== Awards and nominations ==
Award	Year	Category	Nominated work	Result	Ref.
Grammy Awards	2022	Best Latin Rock or Alternative Album	Calambre	Nominated	
Grammy Awards	2025	Best Latin Rock or Alternative Album	Grasa	Nominated	
Heat Latin Music Awards	2021	Best Female Artist	Herself	Nominated	
Heat Latin Music Awards	2021	Best New Artist	Herself	Nominated	
Heat Latin Music Awards	2021	Best Artist South Region	Herself	Nominated	
Heat Latin Music Awards	2022	Best Female Artist	Herself	Nominated	
Heat Latin Music Awards	2022	Best Artist South Region	Herself	Nominated	
Latin Alternative Music Conference	2019	Discovery Artist	Herself	Won	
Latin Grammy Awards	2020	Best New Artist	Herself	Nominated	
Latin Grammy Awards	2020	Best Alternative Song	"BUENOS AIRES"	Nominated	
Latin Grammy Awards	2021	Best Alternative Music Album	Calambre	Won	
Latin Grammy Awards	2021	Best Urban Fusion/Performance	"Nathy Peluso: Bzrp Music Sessions, Vol. 36" (with Bizarrap)	Nominated	
Latin Grammy Awards	2021	Best Rap/Hip Hop Song	"SANA SANA"	Nominated	
Latin Grammy Awards	2021	Best Alternative Song	"AGARRATE"	Nominated	
Latin Grammy Awards	2022	Album of the Year	Aguilera (as songwriter)	Nominated	
Latin Grammy Awards	2022	Record of the Year	"Pa Mis Muchachas" (with Christina Aguilera, Nicki Nicole & Becky G)	Nominated	
Latin Grammy Awards	2022	Song of the Year	"Pa Mis Muchachas" (with Christina Aguilera, Nicki Nicole & Becky G)	Nominated	
Latin Grammy Awards	2022	Best Urban Fusion/Performance	"Pa Mis Muchachas" (with Christina Aguilera, Nicki Nicole & Becky G)	Nominated	
Latin Grammy Awards	2023	Best Short Form Music Video	"Estás Buenísimo"	Won	
Latin Grammy Awards	2024	Best Alternative Song	"El Día Que Perdí Mi Juventud"	Won	
Latin Grammy Awards	2024	Best Rap/Hip Hop Song	"Aprender a Amar"	Won	
Latin Grammy Awards	2024	Best Long Form Music Video	Grasa (Album Long Form)	Won	
Latin Grammy Awards	2025	Best Urban/Urban Fusion Performance	"De Maravisha" (with Tokischa)	Nominated	
Latin Grammy Awards	2025	Best Urban Song	"XQ Eres Así" (with Álvaro Díaz)	Nominated	
LOS40 Music Awards	2021	Best New Latin Act	Herself	Nominated	
LOS40 Music Awards	2022	Best Latin Live Act	Herself	Nominated	
LOS40 Music Awards	2022	Best Video	"Ateo" (with C. Tangana)	Nominated	
LOS40 Music Awards	2022	Best Collaboration	"Ateo" (with C. Tangana)	Nominated	
LOS40 Music Awards	2023	Best Latin Song	"Tonta"	Nominated	
LOS40 Music Awards	2023	Best Latin Collaboration	"Ella Tiene" (with Tiago PZK)	Nominated	
MTV Millennial Awards	2021	Bichota of the Year	Herself	Nominated	
MTV Millennial Awards	2021	Viral Anthem	"Nathy Peluso: Bzrp Music Sessions, Vol. 36" (with Bizarrap)	Nominated	
MTV Millennial Awards	2022	Video of the Year	"Ateo"	Nominated	
Premios a la Musica Independiente	2019	Song of the Year	"La Sandunguera"	Nominated	
Premios a la Musica Independiente	2019	Best Music Video	"La Sandunguera"	Nominated	
Premios Gardel (Note: At the 23rd Annual Gardel Awards, for Calambre, Rafa Arcaute was nominated for Producer of the Year while Albert Romagosa was nominated for Best Cover Design.)	2020	Best New Artist	"Copa Glasé"	Nominated	
Premios Gardel	2021	Album of the Year	Calambre	Nominated	
Premios Gardel	2021	Best Alternative Pop Album	Calambre	Won	
Premios Gardel	2021	Best New Artist	Calambre	Won	
Premios Gardel	2021	Song of the Year	"Nathy Peluso: Bzrp Music Sessions, Vol. 36" (with Bizarrap)	Nominated	
Premios Gardel	2021	Best Urban/Trap Song or Album	"Nathy Peluso: Bzrp Music Sessions, Vol. 36" (with Bizarrap)	Won	
Premios Gardel	2021	Best Music Video	"Nathy Peluso: Bzrp Music Sessions, Vol. 36" (with Bizarrap)	Nominated	
Premios Gardel	2021	Record of the Year	"BUENOS AIRES"	Won	
Premios Gardel	2022	Record of the Year	"Mafiosa"	Won	
Premios Gardel	2022	Song of the Year	"Mafiosa"	Nominated	
Premios Gardel	2022	Best Pop Song	"Mafiosa"	Nominated	
Premios Gardel	2023	Record of the Year	"Argentina" (with Trueno)	Won	
Premios Gardel	2023	Song of the Year	"Argentina" (with Trueno)	Nominated	
Premios Gardel	2023	Best Urban Music Song	"Argentina" (with Trueno)	Nominated	
Premio Lo Nuestro	2021	Best New Female Artist	Herself	Nominated	
Premios Odeón	2021	Best New Urban Artist	Herself	Nominated	
Premios Odeón	2021	Best Urban Music Album	Calambre	Nominated	
Premios Odeón	2022	Best New Urban Artist	Herself	Won	
Premios Odeón	2022	Best Urban Song	"Ateo" (with C. Tangana)	Nominated	
Premios Quiero	2021	Best Rap / Trap / Hip-Hop Video	"Nathy Peluso: Bzrp Music Sessions, Vol. 36" (with Bizarrap)	Nominated	
Premios Quiero	2022	Best Rap / Trap / Hip-Hop Video	"Argentina" (with Trueno)	Nominated	
