= La Sandunguera =

2018 EP by Nathy Peluso

EP by Nathy Peluso
- Released: April 6, 2018
- Recorded: 2017
- Genre: Jazz rap; neo soul; alternative R&B
- Length: 20:56
- Language: Spanish; English
- Label: Everlasting Records
- Producer: Pedro Campos; Dano Ziontifik

Nathy Peluso chronology
Esmeralda (2017)	La Sandunguera (2018)	Calambre (2020)

Singles from La Sandunguera
- 1. "La Sandunguera" Released: February 6, 2018; 2. "Estoy Triste" Released: April 6, 2018

La Sandunguera (Spanish for "the party-loving") is the debut extended play (EP) by Argentine singer and songwriter Nathy Peluso. It was released on April 6, 2018, only six months after her debut mixtape Esmeralda (2017) dropped, through the independent label Everlasting Records. It spawned two singles: the title track as well as "Estoy Triste", and reached the twenty eighth position on the PROMUSICAE chart.

== Background ==
After specializing in Visual Arts and Dance Pedagogy at the King Juan Carlos University in Madrid, Peluso independently released a seven-track mixtape titled Esmeralda in October 2017, which features hits such as "Alabame" and "Esmeralda". The mixtape aroused the interest of many music critics and independent magazines such as Mondo Sonoro and Rockdelux. A month later, she released the standalone single "Corashe", which was positively received by the public.

== Artwork ==
The album cover was photographed by Argentine photographer Juan Borgognoni, while Ausias Pérez was responsible for the creative direction and graphic design of the cover. It shows the singer in front of a brown background and with tears on her face. In an Instagram post, Juan revealed that he was introduced to Peluso a few months earlier and that they became "soul and heart" in the EP's photo shoot. He also wrote that the cover of La Sandunguera contains the intention to convey the love, joy, sadness, intensity and celebration of life to the public.

== Release ==
Sometime between December 2017 and February 2018, Peluso revealed that her debut EP would be called La Sandunguera and that it would come out on March 9, 2018, but the project was pushed back to April 6, 2018, due to technical issues. On April 6, 2018, the EP was released by Everlasting Records in digital download and streaming form. A day later, the physical edition of La Sandunguera began to be sold in stores in Spain. In mid-June, the project received a vinyl version, which was only available in Spanish territory.

On May 27, 2018, Nathy performed the first and only televised performance of the single "La Sandunguera" in the 8th season of the Spanish talent show Fama, ¡a bailar!. On June 5, she presented it on the late night show La Resistencia, which airs on the television platform Movistar+. On YouTube, the singer's interview attracted more than 2 million views. On August 30, Peluso participated in a music session for the Austrian company Red Bull, where she sang the tracks "Hot Butter" and "La Sandunguera". She also gave interviews to vehicles such as El País, PlayGround and the Castilian edition of the US-Canadian magazine Vice.

== Critical reception ==
La Sandunguera received positive reviews from music critics. Raúl Guillén of Jenesaispop said La Sandunguera "is a bold and powerful project that leaves no doubts about Nathy's enormous virtues, although it is far removed from the presumptions of the new hip hop." He rated the title track along with the songs "Hot Butter", "La Passione" and "Estoy Triste" as the best on the EP.

For Alan Queipo, from Mondo Sonoro magazine, La Sandunguera "presents five songs that complement, feed and add to the discourse (aesthetic, sonorous, lyrical) of the song that reigns as the connecting axis on the EP's equator, as a permanent center of gravity which makes one look at Latin music, contemporary urban music, soul and R&B cadences, and the particular 'Peluso universe'". He concludes by saying that "Nathy asserts with conviction that no one can command her.

Rating the album 9.25 out of 10 stars, Vibes Of Silence's Nacho wrote that the EP "shows a theatrical madness of soul and R&B, and Nathy's brilliant voice and versatility." He defined the EP as a "conceptual exercise with a more organic approach, in which she flirts with salsa, blues, jazz vocal patterns, Italian song and radio soap opera". He praised the singer, highlighting her brilliant voice and her versatility, and saying that she was definitely ready to stay in the music industry.

== Commercial performance ==
La Sandunguera reached the twenty-eighth position on the official music album chart in Spain — which is held by PROMUSICAE — and remained on the music chart for three weeks. It was also one of the 25 best-selling albums on the website of the American multinational technology company Amazon. La Sandunguera's tracks were featured on the Latin charts of the Apple Music streaming service in countries across Africa, North America, South America, Asia and Oceania.

== Track listing ==
No.	Title	Writer(s)	Producer(s)	Length
1.	"Estoy Triste"	Jean Marcel Bouchety; Nathalia Peluso	Dano Ziontifik	2:48
2.	"Hot Butter"	Peluso; Pedro Campos	Pedro Campos	3:58
3.	"Gimme Some Pizza"	Peluso; Campos		4:52
4.	"La Sandunguera"	Peluso; Campos	Campos	3:25
5.	"Ma Time"	Jacky Bernard; Peluso	Dano Ziontifik	1:20
6.	"La Passione"	Peluso; Campos	Campos	4:34
Total length:				20:57

== Charts ==
Chart (2018)	Peak position
Spain (PROMUSICAE)	28

== Release history ==
Release dates and formats for La Sandunguera
Region	Date	Format	Label
Various	April 6, 2018	Digital download; streaming	Everlasting
Spain	April 7, 2018	CD	Everlasting
Spain	June 15, 2018	Vinyl	Everlasting
