= Rubén Darío Salas =

Venezuelan audio engineer and music producer

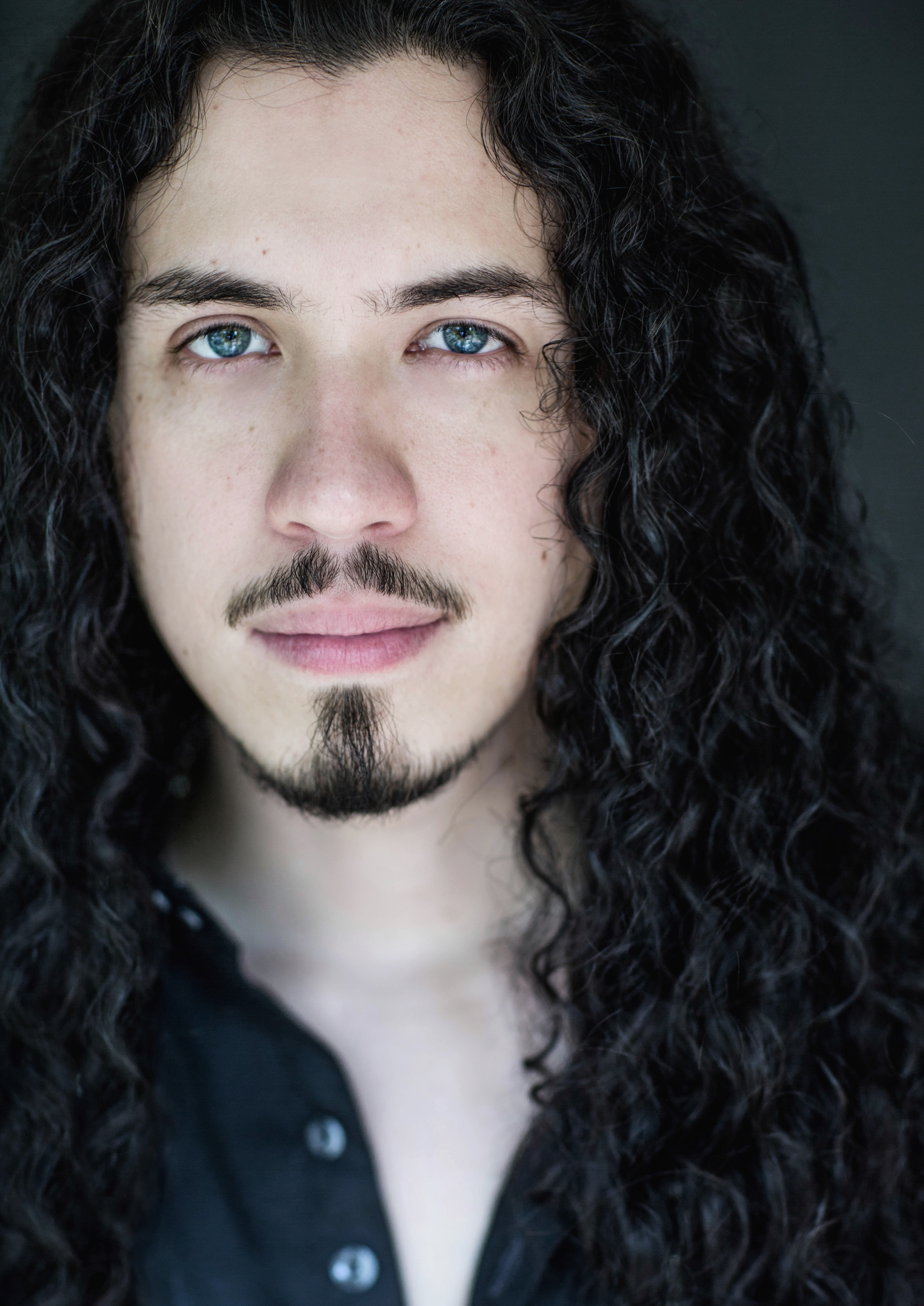

Background information
- Born: Caracas, Venezuela
- Genres: Latin, Pop, Rock, Children's music, Tango, Salsa, Urban, Instrumental, Classical
- Occupations: Record producer, recording engineer
- Website: rubendariosalas.com

Rubén Darío Salas is a Latin Grammy-winning audio engineer and music producer.

== Early life ==
Salas was born in Caracas, Venezuela. He moved to the U.S. in 2006 and received his degree in audio engineering and music business from Full Sail University.

== Career ==
Salas began working as an audio engineer for recording, radio and television studios as well as working on live show productions, and in 2011 he co-founded an audio-visual facility in Venezuela.

In 2016, Salas was nominated for a Latin Grammy for "Arriba Abajo" by 123 Andrés for Best Children’s Album. Arriba Abajo won Latin Grammy Award for Best Latin Children's Album and Salas was awarded a Grammy as audio engineer for the album.

Salas’s work as audio engineer has also been recognized by the National Academy of Christian Music and Arts. He was awarded an ARPA award for the album "Todas las Tardes, El Album" by Clayton Uehara.

In early 2017 Salas worked on the song "Vivo Pensando en Ti" with Latin pop stars Maluma and Felipe Pelaez”.

In 2017, three albums that Salas worked on as audio engineer were nominated for Latin Grammys, including Solo Buenos Aires by Fernando Otero, Tatuajes by Erika Ender and Origen by Daniel Minimalia. On November 16, 2017, Solo Buenos Aires won for Best Tango Album. Salas was awarded a Latin Grammy for his engineering work on the album.
