= Tonta =

2023 single by Nathy Peluso

Single by Nathy Peluso
- Language: Spanish
- English title: "Stupid"
- Released: 20 April 2023
- Genre: Pop
- Length: 3:53
- Label: Sony Spain
- Songwriters: Nathy Peluso; Didi Gutman
- Producers: Illangelo; Nathy Peluso; Didi Gutman

Nathy Peluso singles chronology
| "Estás Buenísimo" (2022) | "Tonta" (2023) | "Salvaje" (2023) |

Music video
- Tonta on YouTube

"Tonta" (stylized in all caps) is a single by Argentine singer Nathy Peluso, released on 20 April 2023.

== Background and composition ==
"Tonta" was co-written by Peluso and Didi Gutman, and was produced by Illangelo. A week before the song's release, Peluso shared a column in Vogue about the inspiration behind the single: "Recently I entered a tormenting inspiration process (a slap in the face). I choked on a lot of transcendental information. Basically a consequence of being pre-thirty (laughs). In the midst of the earthquake, for the first time in my life, I allowed myself to enjoy that crisis. And you don't know the pleasure it gave me to indulge in a fight of that kind." In an interview with Elle, Peluso stated that "Tonta" was inspired by her personal story and encourages listeners to overcome their limitations and embrace their strength.

"Tonta" combines 1980s-inspired rhythms and classic pop with electronic influences. The song speaks in first person about a romantic disappointment but also about self-recognition, confidently asserting her empowerment and that she's "not a fool", and features a message of empowerment and self-love. Mondo Sonoro noted that "Tonta" brings the "distinctive pop touch of her debut studio album, Calambre, but elevated to a higher level of maturity."

== Music video ==
The music video for "Tonta" was directed by Félix Bollaín and produced by LittleSpain. The singer dances and walks through the streets of Manhattan, New York City after seemingly deciding to move out of her apartment in order to forget everything that reminds her of her ex. The video references the Sex and the City character Carrie Bradshaw.

== Charts ==
| Chart (2023) | Peak position |
|---|---|
| Spain (PROMUSICAE) | 83 |
