= Ateo =

2021 single by C. Tangana and Nathy Peluso

Single by C. Tangana and Nathy Peluso

from the album La Sobremesa
- Language: Spanish
- English title: "Atheist"
- Released: 8 October 2021
- Genre: Bachata
- Length: 3:59
- Label: Sony Spain
- Songwriters: Antón Álvarez; Cristian Quirante; Natalia Peluso; Víctor Martínez
- Producers: C. Tangana; Víctor Martínez; Alizzz; Rafa Arcaute

C. Tangana singles chronology
"Ya No Vales" (2021)	"Ateo" (2021)	"Tocarte" (2021)

Nathy Peluso singles chronology
"Mafiosa" (2021)	"Ateo" (2021)	"Pa Mis Muchachas" (2021)

Music video
- "Ateo" on YouTube

"Ateo" (Spanish for "Atheist") is a song recorded by Spanish singer C. Tangana and Argentine singer Nathy Peluso. Written by both performers alongside Alizzz and Víctor Martínez and produced by the mentioned plus Rafa Arcaute, the track was released on 8 October 2021 through Sony Music Spain as a single from the reissue of the 2021 album El Madrileño, titled La Sobremesa (2022). "Ateo" met great commercial success, debuting at number one on the Spanish charts, becoming Peluso's first number one single in the country as well as Tangana's fourth.

Its music video, filmed inside the Toledo Cathedral, sparked enormous controversy between the Spanish ecclesiastical community, eventually causing the resignation of the cathedral's dean Juan Miguel Ferrer after discrepancies of opinions between him and the archbishop Francisco Cerro Chaves.

== Background ==
Rumors about a possible collaboration between the two performers started in mid-September after they were both spotted in Toledo. The track was officially announced through social media on 6 October 2021, alongside a trailer that featured an ensemble cast of journalists talking about a non-shared picture of Tangana grabbing Peluso's hair, "ironizing past sexist allegations of Tangana in the media".

== Music video ==
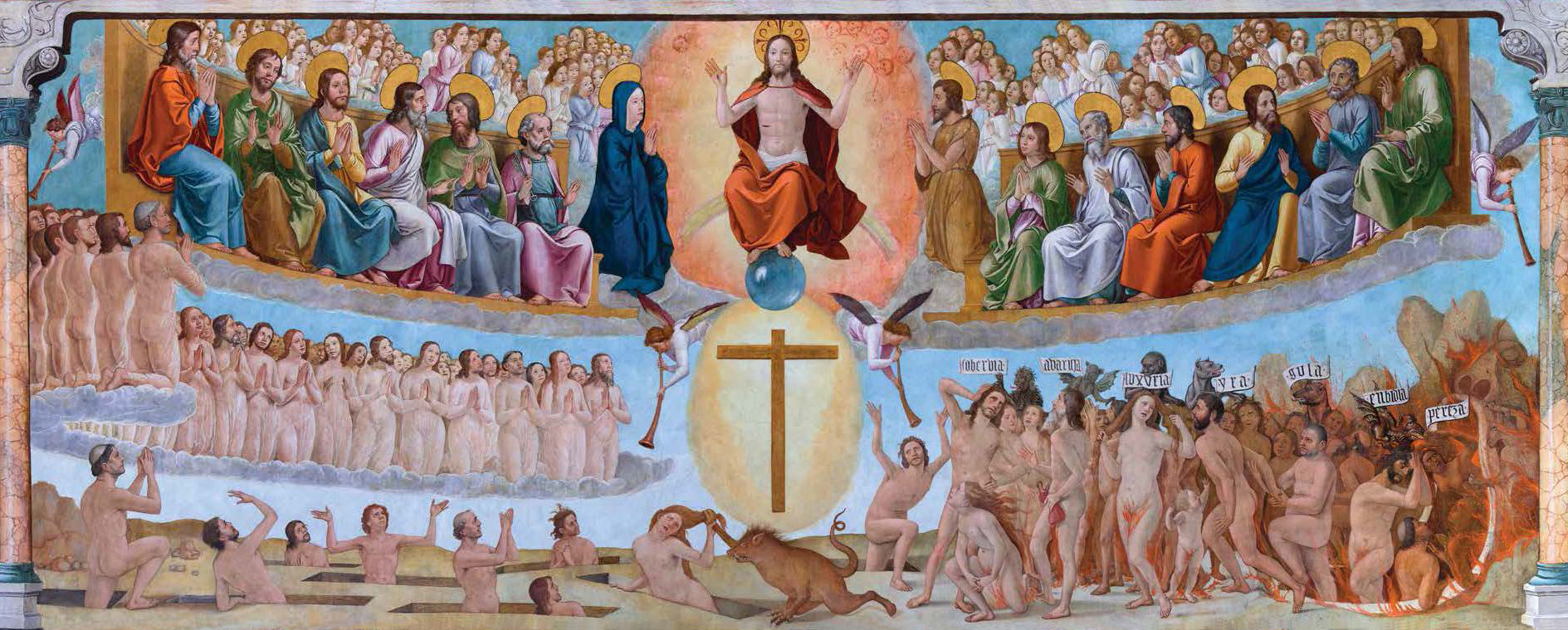
Mural painting by Juan de Borgoña at the cathedral's chapter house inspiring the cover art.

The music video for "Ateo" premiered on YouTube alongside the song. It was written and directed by C. Tangana and produced by his company Little Spain, which also produced all music videos extracted from El Madrileño. It was primarily filmed inside the Toledo Cathedral in mid-September after filming permissions being denied at the Burgos and Segovia Cathedrals. The production reportedly paid €15,000 to shoot in the cathedral.

The video features Tangana and Peluso dancing in the cathedral grinding against each other, as well as guest appearances by Brays Efe, Elizabeth Duval, Josep Pedrerol, Cayetana Guillén Cuervo and Miranda Makaroff, among others. The last four are seen debating in a panel about some images of C. Tangana pulling Peluso's hair. The cover art of the single is directly inspired by one of the mural paintings displayed in the cathedral's chapter house that features a woman held by her hair by a demon to prevent her salvation at the Last Judgment.

=== Controversy ===
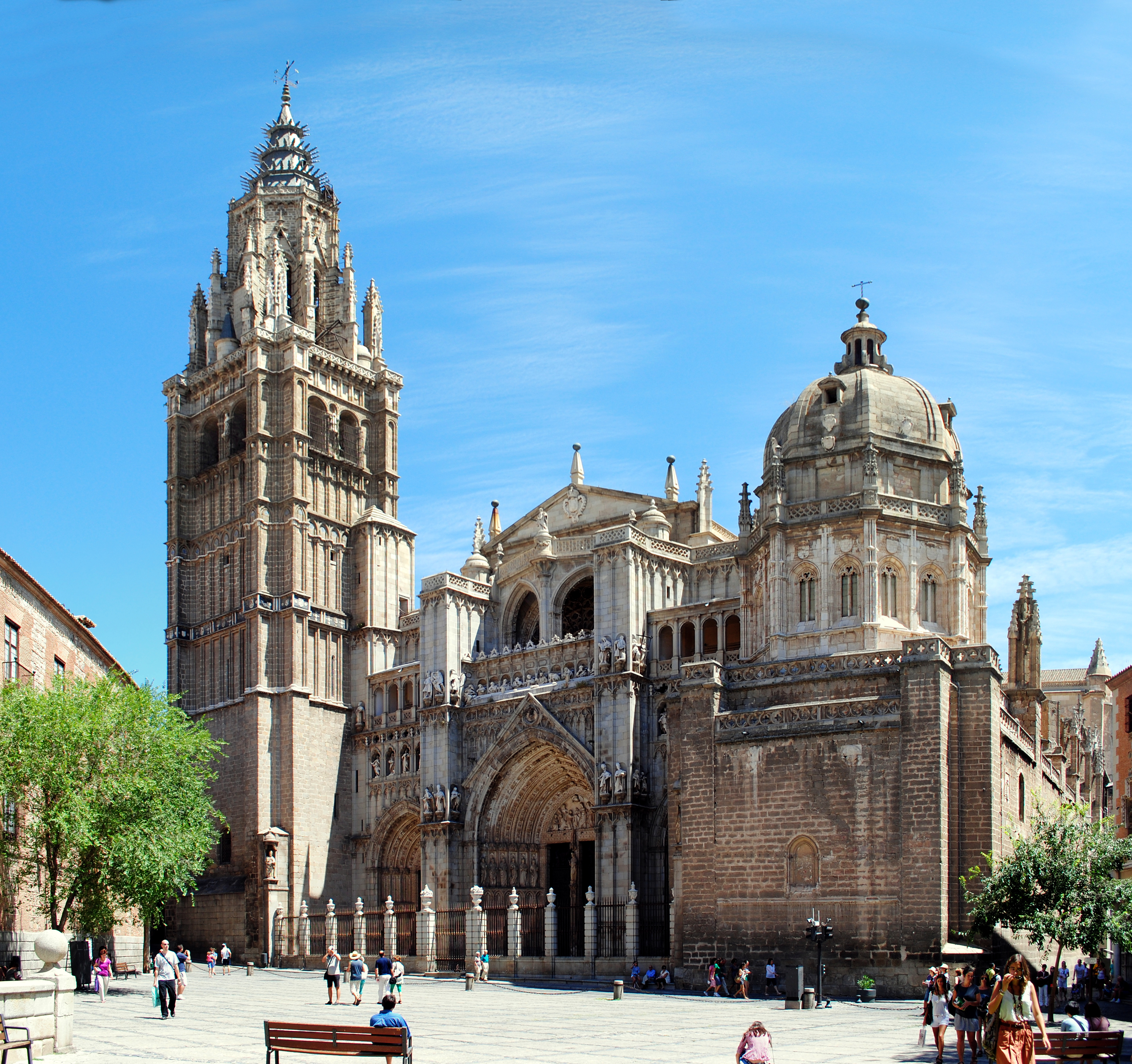
The Toledo Cathedral

Controversy rose upon the release of the music video as Catholic purists expressed their repulse against it. Juan Miguel Ferrer, dean of the primary council of the Toledo Cathedral, stated that "the video presents a story of conversion though human love (...) that opposes "the understanding and acceptance of the Church" in a provocative visual language that does not affect faith". Ferrer continued to say that "the goal was exclusively to favor the dialogue with contemporary culture, always preserving faith and Church". Despite the statement, multiple gatherings against Ferrer and the project took place outside the cathedral; resulting in the dean's resignation over discrepancies with the archbishop Francisco Cerro Chaves.

A purification of the Toledo Cathedral, conducted by Cerro Chaves, took place on 17 October to "repair the sins".

== Personnel ==
Adapted from Jaxsta.

Production

- C. Tangana – production, composition, songwriting; vocals
- Alizzz – production, composition; keyboards, synthesizer
- Nathy Peluso – composition, songwriting; vocals
- Víctor Martínez – songwriting
- Rafa Arcaute – production
- Yasmil Marrufo – bass, guitar
- Richard Bravo – percussion

Technical

- Harto Rodríguez – recording engineer
- Lewis Pickett – mixing engineer
- Chris Athens – mastering engineer

== Charts ==
Chart (2021–2022)	Peak position
Argentina Hot 100 (Billboard)	76
Colombia (National-Report)	83
Global 200 (Billboard)	83
Mexico (Airplay)	30
Spain (Promusicae)	1
US Tropical Airplay (Billboard)	16

== Certifications ==
Region	Certification	Certified units/sales
Mexico (AMPROFON)	Platinum	140,000^{‡}
Spain (Promusicae)	7× Platinum	420,000^{‡}
United States (RIAA)	Gold (Latin)	30,000^{‡}
^{‡} Sales+streaming figures based on certification alone.

== Release history ==
Country	Date	Format	Label
Various	8 October 2021	Digital download; streaming	Sony Spain
Spain	17 October 2021	Contemporary hit radio	Sony Spain
