= Rafa Arcaute =

Argentine songwriter and producer

- Origin: Buenos Aires, Argentina
- Occupations: Producer, songwriter, engineer
- Years active: 2002-present

Rafael “Rafa” Arcaute, is an Argentine songwriter, record producer and recording engineer. He has worked with several Latin American artists including Luis Alberto Spinetta, Shakira, C Tangana, Nathy Peluso, Illya Kuryaki & The Valderramas, Calle 13, Christina Aguilera, Babasónicos and Andrés Calamaro. He has received eighteen Latin Grammy Awards, including two wins for Producer of the Year, and he has also won two American Grammys.

== Career ==
Arcaute studied at the Escuela Superior de Comercio Carlos Pellegrini in Buenos Aires, Argentina and later studied a Degree in Electroacoustic Composition at the Universidad Nacional de Quilmes.

He began working as a touring member of Luis Alberto Spinetta's band Spinetta and as keyboardist and engineer for several of Spinetta's albums including Argentina Sorgo Films Presenta: Spinetta Obras (2002), Para los Árboles (2003) and Camalotus (2004). He then worked in the production of two albums by Puerto Rican band Calle 13, Los de Atrás Vienen Conmigo (2008) and Entren Los Que Quieran (2010).

Arcaute produced two albums by Argentine singer Diego Torres, Distinto (2010) and Buena Vida (2015). In 2011, he worked in Babasónicos's tenth album A Propósito. In 2016, he served as manager for Illya Kuryaki & The Valderramas's tour L.H.O.N. Tour after working in the production of their 2012 album Chances, he also produced Colombian band Aterciopelados's first live album Reluciente, Rechinante y Aterciopelado the same year.

Since 2018, he resides in Miami, United States and works as a part of Sony Music alongside Afo Verde. After working in some of her previous singles, Arcaute produced Argentine singer Nathy Peluso's debut album Calambre, released in 2020, he also worked in Spanish singer C. Tangana's El Madrileño, which was released in 2021.

== Discography ==
Year	Title	Artist	Production	Writing & Arrangements	Instruments	Technical
2002	Argentina Sorgo Films Presenta: Spinetta Obras (A)	Luis Alberto Spinetta			check	
2003	Para los Árboles (A)	Luis Alberto Spinetta		check	check	check
2004	Camalotus (A)	Luis Alberto Spinetta				check
2004	Onyx (A)	Javier Malosetti			check	check
2006	"Rompéme" (S)	Emme		check		
2006	Pan (A)	Luis Alberto Spinetta				check
2007	Mordisco (A)	Emmanuel Horvilleur	check			
2008	Los de Atrás Vienen Conmigo (A)	Calle 13	check	check		
2009	C'est comme ça (A)	Florent Pagny				check
2010	Distinto (A)	Diego Torres	check	check	check	check
2010	On the Rock (A)	Andrés Calamaro	check	check	check	check
2010	Entren Los Que Quieran (A)	Calle 13	check	check		
2011	Pecados y Milagros (A)	Lila Downs			check	
2012	Chances (A)	Illya Kuryaki & The Valderramas	check		check	
2013	Aliados (A)	Aliados	check	check	check	check
2014	Verte Nacer (A)	Noel Schajris	check	check	check	check
2015	Buena Vida (A)	Diego Torres	check	check	check	check
2016	Reluciente, Rechinante y Aterciopelado	Aterciopelados	check			
2017	"La Cátedra" (S)	Residente				check
2018	Ahora o Nunca (A)	La Pegatina	check	check	check	check
2019	"Copa Glasé" (S)	Nathy Peluso	check	check		
2019	Xavier (A)	Emmanuel Horvilleur	check			
2019	"Tutu (Remix)"	Camilo, Pedro Capó and Shakira	check			
2020	Lo que me dé la Gana (A)	Dani Martín	check	check		check
2020	"Los Huesos" (S)	Dani Martín	check	check		
2020	"La Mentira" (S)	Dani Martín	check			
2020	"Business Woman" (S)	Nathy Peluso	check			
2020	Libra (A)	Lali	check	check		
2020	Cumbiana (A)	Carlos Vives		check		
2020	"Favorito" (S)	Camilo		check		
2020	Por Primera Vez	Camilo	check	check		
2021	El Madrileño (A)	C. Tangana	check	check	check	check
2021	Calambre	Nathy Peluso	check	check		
2021	"Canción Bonita" (S)	Carlos Vives and Ricky Martin	check	check	check	check
2021	"La Fuerza" (A)	Christina Aguilera	check	check	check	check
2022	Nunca más (F)			check		

(A) Album, (F) Film, (S), Single

== Awards and nominations ==
=== Grammy Awards ===
Year	Category	Nominated work	Artist	Result	Ref.
2010	Best Latin Rock, Alternative or Urban Album	Los de Atrás Vienen Conmigo (as producer)	Calle 13	Won	

=== Gardel Awards ===
Year	Category	Nominated work	Artist	Result	Ref.
2019	Record of the Year	"Best Seller" (as engineer)	Juan Ingaramo	Nominated	
2021	Producer of the Year	Calambre	Nathy Peluso	Nominated	

=== Latin Grammy Awards ===
Year	Category	Nominated work	Artist	Result	Ref.
2009	Album of the Year	Los de Atrás Vienen Conmigo (as producer)	Calle 13	Won	
2009	Best Urban Music Album	Los de Atrás Vienen Conmigo (as producer)	Calle 13	Won	
2010	Best Engineered Album	Distinto	Diego Torres	Won	
2010	Producer of the Year	Rafael Arcaute and Diego Torres		Nominated	
2011	Album of the Year	Entren Los Que Quieran (as producer)	Calle 13	Won	
2011	Best Urban Music Album	Entren Los Que Quieran (as producer)	Calle 13	Won	
2011	Song of the Year	"Latinoamérica" (as songwriter)	Calle 13	Won	
2011	Record of the Year	"Latinoamérica" (as songwriter)	Calle 13	Won	
2011	Best Alternative Song	"Calma Pueblo" (as songwriter)	Calle 13	Won	
2011	Best Urban Song	"El Baile de los Pobres" (as songwriter)	Calle 13	Won	
2011	Producer of the Year	Rafael Arcaute & Calle 13		Won	
2013	Producer of the Year	Rafael Arcaute		Nominated	
2014	Producer of the Year	Rafael Arcaute		Nominated	
2016	Album of the Year	Buena Vida (as producer)	Diego Torres	Nominated	
2016	Record of the Year	"Iguales" (as producer)	Diego Torres	Nominated	
2016	Producer of the Year	Rafael Arcaute		Won	
2017	Record of the Year	"Guerra" (as producer)	Residente	Nominated	
2017	Album of the Year	Residente (as producer)	Residente	Nominated	
2017	Best Urban Music Album	Residente (as producer)	Residente	Won	
2017	Best Urban Song	"Somos Anormales" (as songwriter)	Residente	Won	
2017	Best Alternative Song	"Apocaliptico" (as songwriter)	Residente	Nominated	
2018	Producer of the Year	Rafael Arcaute		Nominated	
2019	Record of the Year	"Querer Mejor" (as producer)	Juanes and Alessia Cara	Nominated	
2019	Song of the Year	"Querer Mejor" (as producer)	Juanes and Alessia Cara	Nominated	
2020	Best Alternative Song	"BUENOS AIRES" (as songwriter)	Nathy Peluso	Nominated	
2020	Producer of the Year	Rafael Arcaute		Nominated	
2021	Song of the Year	"Canción Bonita" (as songwriter)	Carlos Vives and Ricky Martin	Nominated	
2021	Best Pop Song	"Canción Bonita" (as songwriter)	Carlos Vives and Ricky Martin	Nominated	
2021	Record of the Year	"Te Olvidaste" (as producer/songwriter)	C. Tangana & Omar Apollo	Nominated	
2021	Best Alternative Song	"Te Olvidaste" (as producer/songwriter)	C. Tangana & Omar Apollo	Nominated	
2021	Best Alternative Song	"AGARRATE" (as songwriter)	Nathy Peluso	Nominated	
2021	Best Rap/Hip Hop Song	"SANA SANA" (as songwriter)	Nathy Peluso	Nominated	
2021	Best Alternative Music Album	Calambre (as producer)	Nathy Peluso	Won	
2021	Best Engineered Album	El Madrileño (as mastering engineer)	C. Tangana	Won	
2022	Record of the Year	"Pa Mis Muchachas" (as producer/engineer)	Christina Aguilera, Nicki Nicole, Becky G & Nathy Peluso	Nominated	
2022	Best Traditional Pop Vocal Album	Aguilera (as producer/engineer/songwriter)	Christina Aguilera	Won	
2022	Album of the Year	Aguilera (as producer/engineer/songwriter)	Christina Aguilera	Nominated	
2022	Album of the Year	Tinta y Tiempo (as producer)	Jorge Drexler	Nominated	
2022	Best Alternative Song	"El Día Que Estrenaste el Mundo" (as songwriter)	Jorge Drexler	Won	
2022	Best Regional Mexican Song	"Cuando Me Dé la Gana" (as songwriter)	Christina Aguilera & Christian Nodal	Nominated	
2023	Record of the Year	"No Es Que Te Extrañe" (as producer)	Christina Aguilera	Nominated	
