= Calambre =

2020 studio album by Nathy Peluso

Studio album by Nathy Peluso
- Released: 2 October 2020
- Recorded: 2019–2020
- Genre: Latin hip-hop
- Length: 40:31
- Language: Spanish
- Label: Sony
- Producer: Rafa Arcaute; Pedro Campos; Al Hug; Federico Vindver; Pearl Lion; Rvnes; Illmind; Ángel López; Mosley Bros; Ramón Sánchez; Pop Wansel; Happy Perez

Nathy Peluso chronology
La Sandunguera (2018)	Calambre (2020)	Grasa (2024)

Singles from Calambre
- 1. "Business Woman" Released: 7 February 2020; 2. "Buenos Aires" Released: 29 May 2020; 3. "Sana Sana" Released: 18 September 2020; 4. "Delito" Released: 18 January 2021

Calambre (transl. 'Cramp') is the debut studio album by Argentine singer and rapper Nathy Peluso. Recorded between Barcelona, Buenos Aires and Los Angeles, the album was released on 2 October 2020 by Sony Music. Calambre won the Premio Gardel (the Argentine equivalent to the Grammy Awards) for Best Alternative Pop Album and was also nominated for Album of the Year and Best Cover Design at its 23rd annual edition. The album's second single, "Buenos Aires" also won Record of the Year at the ceremony. Calambre was awarded Best Alternative Music Album at the 22nd Latin Grammy Awards and Best Urban Music Album at the 2021 Premios Odeón. The album was nominated for Best Latin Rock or Alternative Album at the 64th Annual Grammy Awards.

== Background ==
Professional recording sessions for the album's confection began in early 2019 shortly after Peluso signed a record deal with Sony. As she reached mainstream audience in Spain thanks, in major part, to her guest performance at the television talent show Operación Triunfo in March 2020, the album making process was sped up. A tour that would have visited huge music festivals such as Coachella and Lollapalooza was scheduled to happen in early 2020 but was entirely cancelled due to the COVID-19 pandemic. The album's title, cover art and release date was announced through social media on September 15, 2020.

== Recording ==
Peluso stated for Remezcla that during the creative process of the album "I came up with the album in terms of concepts and big picture ideas, and then I had the luck of working with the person who was my right hand on this project: Rafael Arcaute. He helped me shape all the ideas and bring the project together, and he put me in touch with some of the producers you mentioned, like Illmind and Angel Lopez and a bunch of musicians, like Spinetta, who I admire so much. It was really fun because it took place kind of all over the world. I started recording in Spain with my technicians, then I went to Argentina for ‘Buenos Aires’ and recorded in their original studio. I never imagined doing that. Then I went to Los Angeles and the whole thing was just so natural—we locked ourselves in the studio and through improvising for hours, we came up with songs like ‘Sana Sana’ and ‘Trio.’ There are tons of people and I’m so bad at naming everyone, but it was just such an honor to work with musicians who are so huge in genres I admire so much and have studied non-stop".

== Critical reception ==
In order to promote the album, the label stated from Miami that "Calambre is the type of signature album many artists spend a lifetime pursuing. Nathy Peluso’s grand vision has been achieved in this work that captures lightning in a bottle and raises the bar for musical excellence". Meanwhile, Jesús García Serrano from Mondo Sonoro gave the album a seven out of ten defending that "there is no doubt about the talent and versatility of Nathy Peluso; a voice with abundant power, that comes to give a breath of fresh air to Latin pop, fusing urban sounds with classic genres. His rogue lyrics and pose are another story, the same they empower you that make you put your hands to your head". García Serrano also named Calambre the 33rd best album made-in-Spain of 2020. Online magazine Remezcla stated that "the record is in-your-face and relentless, which seems to be exactly her goal". Jordi Bardají wrote for Jenesaispop that "in many cases it seems that Nathy has put her lyrics, and also her voice, before the possibility of making an album that renews or shows the sounds she has grown up with from a different point of view. In their case at least they accompany some great songs, but perhaps relying too much on their influences was unavoidable today". Bardají gave the album a great score of eight out of ten. Billboard said that Calambre is "a box full of surprises, showcasing Peluso’s vocal and rhythmic versatility".

Conversely, Peluso has been accused of cultural appropriation by some Internet publications, due to her use of Caribbean and African American symbology. Peluso is from Argentina but has lived in Spain since her early teenage years. Some accused Peluso of blackfishing and trying to copy American rapper Hurricane G. Many compared Peluso's situation with the one Spanish songstress Rosalía suffered after releasing her sophomore album El Mal Querer, which combined flamenco music with modern urban sounds. Rosalía was also accused of appropriating the culture of Romani people and Andalusians although being Catalan.

== Track listing ==
Calambre track listing
No.	Title	Writer(s)	Producer(s)	Length
1.	"Celebré"	Nathy Peluso; Pedro Campos	Rafa Arcaute	3:37
2.	"Sana Sana"	Ángel López; Federico Vindver; Gino Borri; Illmind; Peluso; Arcaute	Arcaute; Ángel López; Federico Vindver; Illmind	2:59
3.	"Buenos Aires"	Peluso; Campos; Arcaute	Arcaute	4:00
4.	"Delito"	Al Hug; Vindver; Borri; Peluso; Pearl Lion; Arcaute; Rvnes	Arcaute; Vindver; Pearl Lion; Rvnes; Al Hug	3:23
5.	"Sugga"	Peluso; Campos	Pop Wansel; Happy Perez	3:10
6.	"Trío"	Elena Rose; Vindver; Borri; Mosley Bros; Peluso; Arcaute	Arcaute	3:06
7.	"Business Woman"	Peluso; Campos	Pedro Campos; Arcaute; Vindver	3:47
8.	"Llamame"	Peluso; Campos	Arcaute	3:41
9.	"Amor Salvaje"	Peluso; Campos	Campos; Arcaute	3:13
10.	"Arrorró"	Peluso; Campos	Arcaute	1:28
11.	"Puro Veneno"	Peluso; Campos; Arcaute	Arcaute; Ramón Sánchez	4:08
12.	"Agarrate"	Peluso; Campos; Arcaute	Arcaute	4:02
Total length:				40:31

=== Notes ===
- "Sana Sana" contains a sample of "Excellent" by Princess Nokia.

== Charts ==
=== Weekly charts ===
Weekly chart performance for Calambre
Chart (2020)	Peak position
Spanish Albums (PROMUSICAE)	5

=== Year-end charts ===
Year-end chart performance for Calambre
Chart (2021)	Position
Spanish Albums (PROMUSICAE)	48

== Certifications ==
Certifications for Calambre
Region	Certification	Certified units/sales
Spain (Promusicae)	Gold	20,000^{‡}
^{‡} Sales+streaming figures based on certification alone.
