= Nathy Peluso: Bzrp Music Sessions, Vol. 36 =

2020 single by Bizarrap and Nathy Peluso

Single by Bizarrap and Nathy Peluso
- Released: November 27, 2020
- Recorded: 2020
- Studio: BZRP Studio, Ramos Mejía, Buenos Aires, Argentina
- Genre: Hip-hop; Latin trap
- Length: 2:51
- Label: Dale Play
- Songwriter: Natalia Peluso
- Producer: Bizarrap

Bizarrap singles chronology
"Asan: Bzrp Music Sessions, Vol. 35" (2020)	"Nathy Peluso: Bzrp Music Sessions, Vol. 36" (2020)	"YSY A: Bzrp Music Sessions, Vol. 37" (2021)

Nathy Peluso singles chronology
"Sana Sana" (2020)	"Nathy Peluso: Bzrp Music Sessions, Vol. 36" (2020)	"Delito" (2021)

Music video
- "Nathy Peluso: Bzrp Music Sessions, Vol. 36" on YouTube

"Nathy Peluso: Bzrp Music Sessions, Vol. 36" (also known as "Nasty Girl") is a song recorded by Argentine producer Bizarrap and Argentine-Spanish singer Nathy Peluso belonging to his section of Bzrp Music Sessions. Released on November 27, 2020 through Dale Play Records, it achieved instant social media virality in Hispanic countries for its catchy lyrics. Commercially, the song reached number 4 on the Billboard Argentina Hot 100 chart and peaked at 121 on the Global 200, among others. The track was nominated in two Premios Gardel categories, Song of the Year and Best Urban/Trap Song, winning the latter one. It was later featured in the soundtrack for season four of hit Spanish Netflix show Elite as its main song.

== Background ==
Bizarrap announced the Music Sessions through a video preview that he published on his social media. Later Nathy Peluso shared that same video on her Instagram.

== Personnel ==
Credits adapted from Genius.

- Nathy Peluso – vocals
- Bizarrap – producer
- Evlay – mixing
- Javier Fracchia – mastering
- ElTiin14 – artwork
- Lautaro Furiolo – videographer

== Charts ==
Chart performance for "Nathy Peluso: Bzrp Music Sessions, Vol. 36"
Chart (2020–2021)	Peak position
Argentina (Argentina Hot 100)	4
Argentina Digital Songs (CAPIF)	5
Argentina National Songs (Monitor Latino)	11
Global 200 (Billboard)	121
Paraguay (SGP)	24
Spain (PROMUSICAE)	11
Uruguay (CUD)	9

== Certifications ==
Certifications for "Nathy Peluso: Bzrp Music Sessions, Vol. 36"
Region	Certification	Certified units/sales
Spain (PROMUSICAE)	3× Platinum	120,000^{‡}
^{‡} Sales+streaming figures based on certification alone.
