= Gregg Field =

American music producer and musician

- Born: February 21, 1956 (age 69); Castro Valley, California, US
- Genres: Jazz; others
- Occupations: Music producer; Musician

Gregg Field (born February 21, 1956) is an American record producer and musician, who has worked with many well-known artists. He is a recipient of multiple Grammy and Emmy awards.

== Early life ==
Field was born in Castro Valley, California, United States.

== Career ==
Field is a music producer, musician, educator and author. As of 2021, he is the Governor of the Los Angeles Chapter of the Recording Academy.

=== Drumming career ===
Beginning at the age of 19, Field toured and played for Ray Charles, Harry James, Mel Torme, Count Basie, Ella Fitzgerald and Frank Sinatra. Field played on his first Grammy-winning album Warm Breeze with Count Basie (1982), was Frank Sinatra's last drummer from 1991 to 1995. He recorded Sinatra's multi-platinum Duets/Duets II.

As a Los Angeles session musician, Field has also recorded with Barbra Streisand, Michael Buble, Placido Domingo, John Legend, Seal, Barry Manilow, Natalie Cole, Gloria Estefan, Alejandro Fernandez, Arturo Sandoval George Benson, Il Volo, Jason Mraz, Bette Midler, Ray Charles, Vanessa Williams, Ella Fitzgerald, Ledisi, Vince Gill, Amy Grant, Dave Koz, Dean Martin, Shelby Lynne, Anne Murray, Johnny Mathis, Matthew Morrison, Patti Austin, Monica Mancini, Al Jarreau, Shelly Berg, Bob Florence, Tom Scott, and Sharleen Spiteri. In 2000, Field released his debut solo CD, The Art of Swing.

=== Music producer and music director ===
Field has produced recordings with John Williams, Herbie Hancock, Stevie Wonder, Placido Domingo, Ariana Grande, Arturo Sandoval, Josh Groban, Alejandro Sanz, Anna-Frid Lyngstad (Abba), Ray Charles, Andra Day, Diane Warren, Ledisi, Mark O'Connor, The London Symphony, Juan Luis Guerra, Prince Royce, The Royal Philharmonic Orchestra, Brian Wilson, Jackson Browne, Jose Serebrier, The Big Phat Band, Al Jarraeu, Cassandra Wilson, Jonathan Antoine, Vicente Amigo, Patti Austin, The Count Basie Orchestra, Monica Mancini, David Alan Grier, Tom Scott, Nancy Wilson, Take 6, Lizz Wright, Shelly Berg, Clint Holmes, Germán Lopez, The Mighty-Mighty, Valeria Lynch, Patricia Sosa, Barbara Padilla, Afro-Blue.

In 2018, Field received the Emmy for "Outstanding Music Direction” for the PBS special “The Library of Congress-Gershwin Prize” honoring Tony Bennett.

=== Academic career ===
As of 2021, Field was the Chairman of the USC Thornton Music School Board of Councilors.

=== Author ===
Field is a Vanity Fair magazine contributor.

== Personal life ==
Field lives in Los Angeles and is married to the singer Monica Mancini.

== Selected credits ==
Selected credits for Gregg Field:

=== Live concerts and TV recordings ===
- The Montreaux Jazz Festival-Concord Records Celebration (Producer, Music Direction)
- The Hollywood Bowl-Concord Records 30th Anniversary Celebration (Producer, Music Direction)
- The Hollywood Bowl Celebrates Ray Charles (Producer, Music Direction)
- The Hollywood Bowl Celebrates George Gershwin (Producer, Music Direction)
- The Hollywood Bowl Celebrates Ella & Basie (Producer, Music Direction)
- The Apollo Theater's Ella Fitzgerald 100th Birthday Celebration (Producer, Music Direction)
- The Apollo Theater's Nina & Me celebrating Nina Simone (Producer, Music Direction)
- The Aspen Jazz Festival Celebrates Ella's 100th (Producer, Music Direction)
- The Library of Congress Gershwin Prize honoring Carole King (Producer, Music Direction)

=== Television ===
- ABC Norman Lear-100 Years of Music and Laughter (Music Producer, Music Direction)
- PBS Great Performances special We Love Ella (Producer, Music Direction)
- the PBS Annual White House Christmas Tree Lighting Special (2010-2016) (Music Direction)
- The Library of Congress Gershwin Prize honoring Tony Bennett (Music Direction)
- The Library of Congress Gershwin Prize honoring Gloria & Emilio Estefan (Producer, Music Direction)
- Ledisi Live-A Tribute to Nina Simone (Producer)
- PBS In Performance at the White House-Música Latina (Music Direction)
- Tony Bennett Celebrates 90, NBC (Musician)
- The Frank Sinatra Special The Man and His Music, NBC (Musician)
- Count Basie at Carnegie Hall (Musician)

Field was featured in the 2020 HBO Documentary The Apollo, the Count Basie documentary Count Basie-Through His Eyes, and the Ella Fitzgerald documentary Just One of Those Things.

== Awards and nominations ==
=== Grammy and Emmy awards ===
Field has won or been nominated in 10 Grammy and Latin Grammy categories, including:

- Latin Grammy Award for Producer of the Year (twice)
- Latin Grammy Album of the Year
- Grammy Award for Best Pop Performance by a Duo or Group with Vocals
- Grammy Award for Best Traditional Pop Vocal Album
- Grammy Award for Best Contemporary Jazz Album
- Grammy Award for Best Jazz Vocal Album
- Grammy Award for Best Large Jazz Ensemble Album (twice)
- Grammy Award for Best Bluegrass Album
- Latin Grammy Award for Best Tango Album
- Grammy Award for Best Arrangement, Instrumental and Vocals
- Latin Grammy Award for Best Engineered Album

For his album Cannon Reloaded, Field received the 2008 Grammy Award for Best Contemporary Jazz Album nomination.

| Year | Award | Category | Credit | Status |
|---|---|---|---|---|
| 2003 | Grammy Award | Best Jazz Vocal | producer and engineer | Nominated |
| 2005 | Grammy Award | Best Traditional Pop Vocal | producer | Nominated |
| 2005 | Grammy Award | Best Pop Collaboration by a Duo or Group | producer | Nominated |
| 2008 | Grammy Award | Best Contemporary Jazz Album nomination | | Nominated |
| 2010 | Latin Grammy Award | Best Jazz Album | producer and engineer | Won |
| 2010 | Latin Grammy Award | Producer of the Year | | Won |
| 2012 | Latin Grammy Award | Producer of the Year | | Nominated |
| 2012 | Latin Grammy Award | Best Latin Jazz Album | producer and engineer | Won |
| 2012 | Latin Grammy Award | Best Tango Album | producer | Won |
| 2012 | Latin Grammy Award | Best Engineered Album | engineer | Won |
| 2013 | Grammy Award | Best Large Ensemble | producer and engineer | Won |
| 2013 | Grammy Award | Best Instrumental Arrangement | producer | Nominated |
| 2014 | Grammy Award | Best Instrumental Arrangement | producer | Nominated |
| 2015 | Grammy Award | Best Large Ensemble | producer and engineer | Won |
| 2015 | Grammy Award | Best Instrumental Composition | producer | Nominated |
| 2015 | Grammy Award | Best Instrumental Arrangement | producer | Nominated |
| 2015 | Grammy Award | Best Instrumental Accompanying a Vocal | producer | Nominated |
| 2016 | Grammy Award | Best Bluegrass Album | producer and engineer | Won |
| 2018 | Grammy Award | Best Instrumental or Vocal Arrangement Accompanying a Vocal | arranger and producer | Nominated |
| 2018 | Grammy Award | Best Instrumental or Vocal Arrangement Accompanying a Vocal | producer | Nominated |
| 2018 | Emmy Award | Outstanding Music Direction | Tony Bennett: The Library of Congress Gershwin Prize for Popular Song | Won |
| 2019 | Grammy Award | Best Large Ensemble | producer and engineer | Nominated |

=== Others ===
Field has been voted into the Modern Drummer magazine Reader's Poll five times.

1n 2009, Field received the Idyllwild Arts Foundation Life in Arts award.

In 2015, Field received the USC Thornton School of Music The Brandon Mehrle Special Commendation Award.

In 2019, Field was invited to deliver the commencement address at the U.S.C. Thornton Music School
