= Milan Kovačević =

Serbian politician

Milan Kovačević

Milan Kovačević, nicknamed Mićo (Serbian Cyrillic: Милан Ковачевић; 1941 – 1998), was the president of the executive committee of the Municipal Assembly of Prijedor from January 1991 to March 1993. He also served as the vice president of the Municipality of Prijedor Crisis Staff after the Crisis Staff took over control of the town of Prijedor in April 1992. He was an anesthesiologist by profession and most recently served as the director of the Prijedor Medical Center, after his resignation as president of the executive committee in March 1993.

As the vice president of the Crisis Staff, Kovačević played a key role in the crimes that occurred in the Municipality of Prijedor between April and August 1992, most importantly the establishment and operation of concentration camps targeting Bosnian Muslims and Bosnian Croats, including the Omarska, Keraterm and Trnopolje camps.

== ICTY Indictment ==
Kovačević was indicted in 1997 by the International Criminal Tribunal for the Former Yugoslavia (ICTY) on genocide, complicity to commit genocide and several counts of crimes against humanity, violations of the laws of war and grave breaches of the Geneva Conventions of 1949. He was captured, together with co-accused Simo Drljača, by British Special Air Service (SAS) troops on 10 July 1997 in SFOR's Operation Tango.

He died of natural causes in detention in 1998.
