= List of Latin Grammy Award categories =

The Latin Grammy Awards are awarded in a series of categories, each of which isolate a specific contribution to Latin music. The standard awards list nominees in each category from which a winner is selected. These categories have been added and removed over time.

== Special awards ==
There are special awards which are awarded without nominations, typically for achievements of longer than the past year, which the standard awards apply to:

- Person of the Year is a Special Merit Award presented to an individual who has had a significant effect on Latin music and has taken part in extensive philanthropy.
- Lifetime Achievement Award: is a Special Merit Award presented to performers who have made creative contributions of outstanding artistic significance to the field of recording during their careers.
- Trustees Awards: is a Special Merit Award presented to individuals who have made significant contributions, other than performance, to the field of recording during their careers.
- Hall of Fame Award honors recordings that are at least twenty-five years old that have made significant contributions
- Leading Ladies of Entertainment honors women in the Latin entertainment industry.

== General Field ==
The General Field consists of four standard awards representing the best over-all achievements in performance, production, and songwriting in Spanish and Portuguese languages:

- Record of the Year is awarded to the performer and the production team of a single song.
- Album of the Year is awarded to the performer and the production team of a full album.
- Song of the Year is awarded to the writer(s)/composer(s) of a single song.
- Best New Artist is awarded to an artist without reference to a song or album.

== Genre-specific fields ==
=== Pop ===
- Best Contemporary Pop Album
- Best Traditional Pop Album
- Best Pop Song

=== Electronic ===
- Best Electronic Music Performance

=== Urban ===
- Best Urban Performance
- Best Reggaeton Performance
- Best Urban Music Album
- Best Rap/Hip Hop Song
- Best Urban Song

=== Rock ===
- Best Rock Album
- Best Rock Song
- Best Pop/Rock Album
- Best Pop/Rock Song

=== Alternative ===
- Best Alternative Music Album
- Best Alternative Song

=== Tropical ===
- Best Salsa Album
- Best Cumbia/Vallenato Album
- Best Merengue/Bachata Album
- Best Contemporary Tropical Album
- Best Traditional Tropical Album
- Best Tropical Song

=== Singer-Songwriter ===
- Best Singer-Songwriter Album
- Best Singer-Songwriter Song

=== Regional Mexican ===
- Best Ranchero/Mariachi Album
- Best Banda Album
- Best Tejano Album
- Best Norteño Album
- Best Contemporary Mexican Music Album
- Best Regional Mexican Song

=== Instrumental ===
- Best Instrumental Album

=== Traditional ===
- Best Folk Album
- Best Tango Album
- Best Flamenco Album
- Best Roots Song

=== Jazz ===
- Best Latin Jazz/Jazz Album

=== Christian ===
- Best Christian Album (Spanish Language)
- Best Christian Album (Portuguese Language)

=== Portuguese Language ===
- Best Portuguese Language Contemporary Pop Album
- Best Portuguese Language Rock or Alternative Album
- Best Portuguese Language Urban Performance
- Best Samba/Pagode Album
- Best MPB Album
- Best Sertaneja Music Album
- Best Portuguese Language Roots Album
- Best Portuguese Language Song

Note: The field was originally called "Brazilian" before it was changed to "Portuguese Language" in 2016.

=== Children's ===
- Best Latin Children’s Album

=== Classical ===
- Best Classical Album
- Best Classical Contemporary Composition

=== Visual Media ===
- Best Music for Visual Media

=== Arrangement ===
- Best Arrangement

=== Recording Package ===
- Best Recording Package

=== Songwriter ===
- Songwriter of the Year

=== Production ===
- Best Engineered Album
- Producer of the Year

=== Music video ===
- Best Short Form Music Video
- Best Long Form Music Video

== No longer awarded ==
=== Pop ===
- Best Female Pop Vocal Album
- Best Male Pop Vocal Album
- Best Pop Album by a Duo or Group with Vocals
- Best Contemporary Pop Vocal Album

=== Rock ===
- Best Rock Solo Vocal Album
- Best Rock Vocal Album, Duo or Group

=== Tropical ===
- Best Tropical Fusion Album

=== Regional Mexican ===
- Best Grupero Album

=== Portuguese Language ===
- Best Romantic Music Album
