= Latin Grammy Trustees Award =

- Awarded for: "significant contributions, other than performance, to Latin music during their careers".
- Presented by: Latin Recording Academy
- First award: 2004
- Website: www.latingrammy.com

The Latin Grammy Trustees Award is a special Latin Grammy Award presented annually by the Latin Recording Academy, to individuals "who have made significant contributions, other than performance, to Latin music during their careers". Recipients can include producers, songwriters, composers, record label executives, and journalists. Award recipients are honored during "Latin Grammy Week", a string of galas prior to the annual Latin Grammy Awards ceremony. Since its inception, the award has been presented to recipients originating from Argentina, Brazil, Chile, Colombia, Cuba, the Dominican Republic, Mexico, Puerto Rico, Spain, the United States, Uruguay, and Venezuela. The award was first presented to Mexican composer and musician Manuel Esperón. Since 2005, the Trustees Awards have been presented to more than one recipient. Pierre Cossette is the only recipient of the Latin Grammy Trustees Award to also receive the Grammy Trustees Award in 1995. The accolade, along with the Person of the Year and the Lifetime Achievement awards, were not presented in 2020 due to the COVID-19 pandemic.

== Recipients ==
Year^{[I]}	Image	Recipient	Occupation(s)^{[II]}	Nationality	Ref.
2004	—	Manuel Esperón	Composer pianist	Mexico	
2005	Eduardo Magallanes	Eduardo Magallanes	Producer arranger	Mexico	
2005	—	Rafael Pérez Botija	Songwriter	Spain	
2005	Pierre Cossette	Pierre Cossette	Television producer	Canada	
2006	—	Alejandro Quintero	Publisher record label executive	Mexico	
2006	Rafael Escalona	Rafael Escalona	Songwriter poet	Colombia	
2007	—	João Araujo	Record company executive	Brazil	
2007	Leopoldo Federico	Leopoldo Federico	Bandoneón player songwriter bandleader	Argentina	
2007	—	Fernando Hernández	Record company executive	Mexico	
2008	Simón Díaz	Simón Díaz	Singer songwriter	Venezuela	
2008	—	Larry Harlow	Pianist composer arranger producer	United States	
2008	—	Juanito Márquez	Guitarist songwriter arranger	Cuba	
2009	José Antonio Abreu	José Antonio Abreu	Music educator	Venezuela	
2009	—	Roberto Cantoral García	Songwriter	Mexico	
2010	—	Manuel Bonilla	Singer songwriter	Mexico	
2010	Juan Carlos Calderón	Juan Carlos Calderón	Producer composer arranger	Spain	
2010	Hebe Camargo	Hebe Camargo	Television host singer	Brazil	
2011	Manuel Alejandro	Manuel Alejandro	Songwriter	Spain	
2011	Chucho Ferrer	Jesus "Chucho" Ferrer	Interpreter orchestrator	Mexico	
2011	—	Ray Santos	Composer orchestrator musician	United States	
2012	Juan Habichuela	Juan Carmona Habichuela	Flamenco guitar performer	Spain	
2012	Yomo Toro	Yomo Toro	Cuatro performer	Puerto Rico	
2013	Don Francisco	Mario Kreutzberger "Don Francisco"	Entertainer; TV Personality	Chile	
2013	—	Pedro Ramírez Velazquez	Musician songwriter arranger music director	Mexico	
2014	André Midani	André Midani	Record executive	Brazil	
2014	Juan Vicente Torrealba	Juan Vicente Torrealba	Composer	Venezuela	
2015	—	Federico Britos	Violinist	Uruguay	
2015	Humberto Gatica	Humberto Gatica	Record producer	Chile; United States	
2015	—	Chelique Sarabia	Composer	Venezuela	
2016	Carlos Mejia Godoy	Carlos Mejía Godoy	Journalist singer	Nicaragua	
2016	Nelson Motta	Nelson Motta	Record producer journalist performer	Brazil	
2016	—	Rafael Solano	Songwriter	Dominican Republic	
2017		Jon Fausty	Record engineer	United States	
2017	Lalo Schifrin	Lalo Schifrin	Pianist arranger orchestra conductor composer	Argentina	
2018	—	Horacio Malvicino	record label executive jazz and tango guitarist composer arranger	Argentina	
2018	—	Tomás Muñoz	record label executive	Spain	
2019	—	Mario Kaminsky	record label executive	Argentina	
2020	No award due to the COVID-19 pandemic				
2021	—	Guillermo "Memo" Acosta	producer songwriter	Mexico	
2021	Egidio Cuadrado	Egidio Cuadrado	vallenato accordionist	Colombia	
2022		Manolo Díaz	singer songwriter producer	Spain	
2022		Paquito D'Rivera	saxophonist composer	Cuba; United States	
2022		Abraham Laboriel	bassist	Mexico; United States	
2023		Alex Acuña	drummer percussionist	Peru	
2023		Gustavo Santaolalla	composer singer/songwriter producer	Argentina	
2023	—	Wisón Torres	musical director	Puerto Rico; United States	
2024		Ángel Peña	trumpet player, record producer	Puerto Rico	
2024	—	Chucho Rincón	guitarist	Mexico	
2025	—	Eric Schilling	audio engineer	United States	
2026		Omar Alfanno	songwriter	Panama	

^{^[I]} Each year is linked to an article about the Latin Grammy Awards ceremony of that year.

^{^[II]} The artists' occupation(s) are listed on the Special Awards page on the Latin Grammy Award website.

== See also ==
- List of Latin Grammy Awards categories
- Grammy Trustees Award
- Latin Grammy Lifetime Achievement Award
