= Eugenia León =

Mexican singer

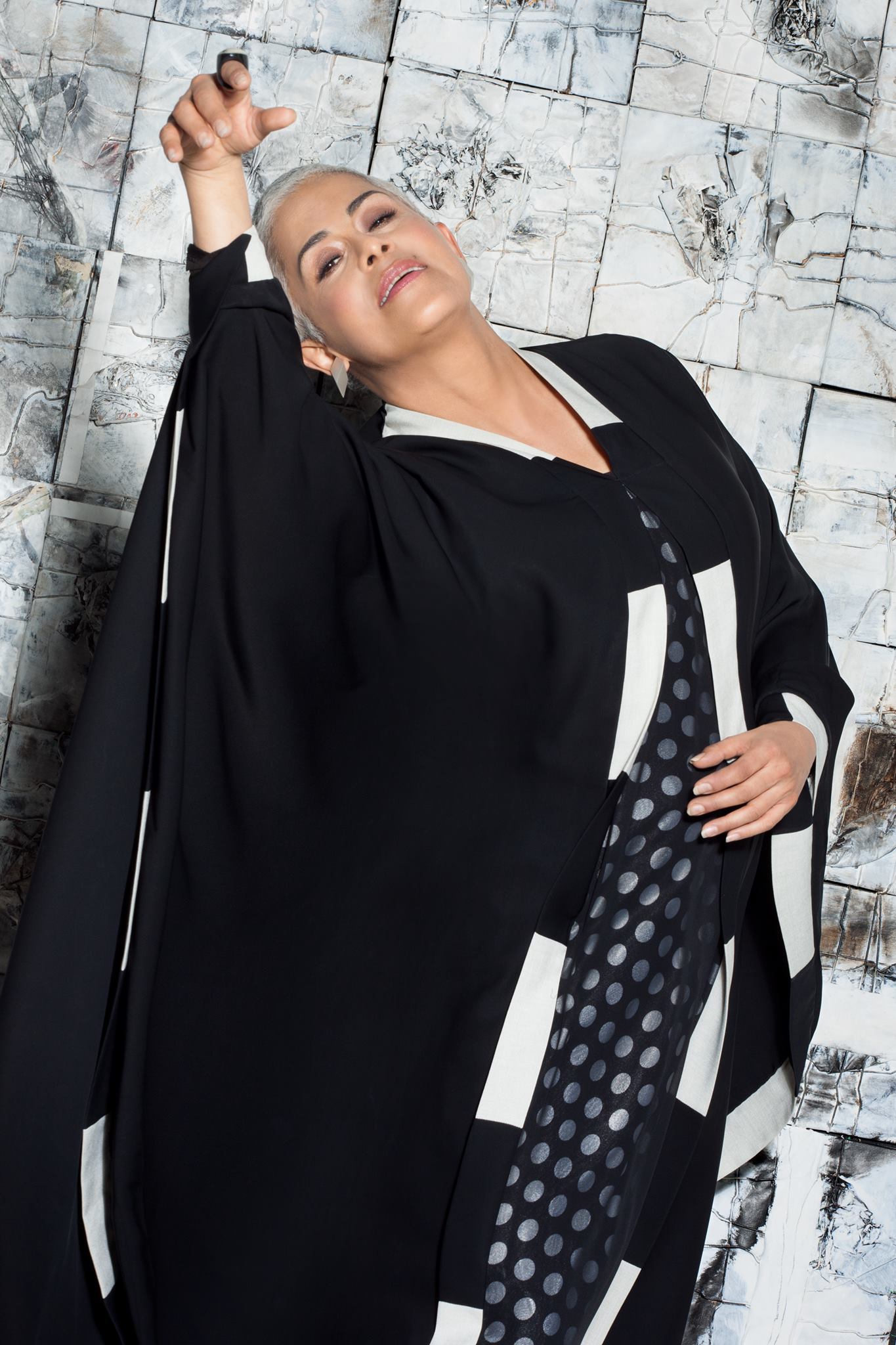
- Born: June 7, 1956 (age 70); Tlalnepantla de Baz, Mexico
- Education: UNAM
- Occupation: Singer
- Awards: Latin Grammy (2016)

Eugenia León (born June 7, 1956) is a Mexican singer. She won first place at the prestigious OTI Festival 1985 in Seville, Spain, with the song "El fandango aquí" written by Marcial Alejandro. A recipient of the Latin Grammy Lifetime Achievement Award, she has had a career spanning more than 40 years and 26 recorded albums, of which several million copies have been sold. She has performed in some of the most important venues in Mexico, such as the Palacio de Bellas Artes, the Auditorio Nacional, the Sala Nezahualcóyotl, the Teatro de la Ciudad, and the Cervantino Festival.

Internationally, León has been acclaimed at the Royal Opera House in Oman, the Concert Hall in Shanghai, the Cairo Opera House and Alexandria Opera House in Egypt, the Royal Palace of Marrakesh, the Universal Forum of Cultures in Barcelona, the European Parliament in Brussels, the Teatro de Cristóbal Colón of Bogotá, the Teatro Oriente in Santiago, the Lincoln Center's Mexico Now Festival, the Central Park Latin Festival, Joe's Pub and Carnegie Hall in New York, the Kennedy Center Jazz Club, The Harold M. Williams Auditorium of the Getty Museum and the Disney Hall in Los Angeles, the Coolidge Auditorium of The Library of Congress, Jackson Hall of the Mondavi Center in Davis, Millennium Park in Chicago, the Tucson Convention Center, the Discovery Green in Houston, and the Palacio de los Deportes in Bogotá. She is the only Mexican to have represented her country as a singer at four consecutive World Exhibitions: Seville, Spain; Lisbon, Portugal; Hannover, Germany; and Aichi, Japan.

In 2003, she made her debut as a presenter on the arts and culture program Acústico, broadcast on Canal 22. Eugenia León has shared the stage with personalities such as Rosario Flores, Pablo Milanés, Marco Antonio Muñiz, Lila Downs, Chavela Vargas, Sin Bandera, José Feliciano, Gilberto Santa Rosa, Armando Manzanero, Los de Abajo, Ramón Vargas, Tania Libertad, and Guadalupe Pineda. Over the years, several musical celebrities, such as Ramón Vargas, Fito Páez, Mercedes Sosa, Willie Colón, and Armando Manzanero have praised her qualities as a singer.

In 2016, she received a gold record certification with Tania Libertad and Guadalupe Pineda for the high sales of their successful project Las Tres Grandes en Primera Fila, awarded by Sony Music. They went on a promotional tour with full concerts throughout Mexico, at venues such as the Auditorio Nacional in Mexico City, the TelMex Auditorium in Guadalajara, and the Auditorio Banamex in Monterrey. This CD/DVD album received a nomination at the 17th Latin Grammy Awards, in the Best Long Version Music Video category.

== Biography ==
=== Early years ===
Born in 1956 in Tlalnepantla de Baz, State of Mexico, Eugenia León entered the Colegio de Ciencias y Humanidades of Naucalpan.

At age 18, she decided to leave home to complete her education at the UNAM National School of Music.

=== Career ===
With the support of her sister, León founded the Víctor Jara group, which was dedicated to Latin American folk music. She later joined the group Sanampay, composed of Mexican and Argentine musicians and singers, directed by Naldo Labrín, from which she decided to emerge individually in 1982, building a repertoire made up of pieces by contemporary Mexican composers, playing bolero and Brazilian music.

She released her first album in 1983, Así te quiero, and toured the Mexican Republic, accompanied by a small group of musicians.

In 1985, she won the 14th Mexican national selection for the OTI Festival with the song "El fandango aquí", written by Marcial Alejandro, and thus represented Mexico at the OTI Festival 1985, which she also won; but there were no celebrations, interviews, or contract signings after her victory, because a devastating earthquake struck Mexico City the day before.

León has recorded more than 20 albums. Some composers whose works she have interpreted are Fito Páez, David Haro, Guillermo Briseño, Joan Manuel Serrat, Marcial Alejandro, Armando Manzanero, José Alfredo Jiménez, Francisco Gabilondo Soler, Liliana Felipe, and María Grever. She has performed in various genres such as mariachi, bolero, and tango.

In 1998, the government of Veracruz presented her with the Agustín Lara medal, in recognition of her interpretations of the composer from that state.

She worked with Pablo Milanés during the Cómplices tour, covering a large part of the Mexican Republic. She also worked with Mexican tenor Ramón Vargas during the production of the album Corazón Mexicano, sponsored by the Government of the Federal District.

In 2003, she began hosting the television program Acústico on Mexico City Canal 22, where she interviewed Ibero-American music personalities. She performed duets with guests such as Daniela Romo, José Feliciano, Lila Downs, Regina Orozco, Susana Zabaleta, Sonora Santanera, Chavela Vargas, Los Folkloristas, Maldita Vecindad, and Amaury Pérez.

Commemorating her 20 years as a performer, Eugenia León gave a concert at the Auditorio Nacional on November 1, 2003, accompanied by Mariachi Vargas and the Symphony Orchestra of the Americas.

She has given international performances in France, Japan, New York, Seville, Cartagena, Germany, Brazil, Morocco, Beijing, and Egypt.

In 2008, León participated as a guest artist in a Mexican special entitled Fiesta Mexicana for the US cultural television network PBS, along with Vikki Carr, Alberto Angel "El Cuervo", and the mariachi group Los Camperos de Nati Cano. She was honored by the municipal government of Tlalnepantla as a favorite daughter of the municipality at the 2008 Equinoccio Festival.

That year she ventured into acting in the film Tear This Heart Out, based on the acclaimed novel by Ángeles Mastretta. She played Toña la Negra, sharing credits with Ana Claudia Talancón, Daniel Giménez Cacho, and José María de Tavira.

León appeared at the opening of the Pan American Games in Guadalajara on October 14, 2011.

== Discography ==
=== Groups ===
- Grupo Víctor Jara, Vamos Patria, Polygram 1978
- Sanampay, A Pesar De Todo, NCL 1981

=== Soloist ===
- Así te quiero, Polygram 1983
- Luz, Polygram 1984
- El Fandango Aquí, Polygram 1985
- Otra vez, Polygram 1986
- Algo viene sucediendo, Polygram 1987
- Maradentro, Polygram 1988
- Ven acá, Polygram 1989
- Lo esencial, Universal Music 1989
- Juego con fuego, BMG 1991
- Eugenia corazón de león, BMG 1993
- Eugenia León interpreta a Cri-Cri, BMG 1994
- Tangos, La Voz De La Sirena 1995
- Que devuelvan, Ediciones El Hábitos-Discos Cabaret 1996
- Tirana, Sony Music 1996
- Oh, noche, Ediciones El Hábitos-Discos Cabaret 1996
- Eugenia León en Directo, Discos Cabaret 1996
- Norteño, Melody 1998
- Corazón mexicano, Gobierno De La Ciudad De México 1998
- La suave Patria, Opción Sónica 1999
- Ni esto, ni l'otro, La Voz De La Sirena 1999
- Acércate más, Universal Music 2000
- Tatuajes, Universal Music 2003
- Ellas Cantan Así, BMG 2003
- La Más Completa Colección, Universal Music 2006
- Pasional, IC21 2007
- Puño de tierra, IC21 2008
- Cine, IC21 2009
- Agua de Beber, Universal Music 2011
- Ciudadana del Mundo Vol. 1, Universal Music 2013
- Ciudadana del Mundo Vol. 2, Universal Music 2013
- Las Tres Grandes en Primera Fila together with Tania Libertad and Guadalupe Pineda, Sony Music 2015
- Una Rosa Encendida, Sony Music 2017
- A los cuatro Vientos 2020
- Esperanza 2023

=== Collaborations ===
- México 68 Vol. 1, IMM 1968
- Amparo Ochoa Canta Con Los Niños, Discos Pueblo 1984
- Está Valiendo... El Corazón, 1987
- Canciones del Íntimo Decoro, Pentagrama 1988
- Entre Amigos, BMG 1993
- 30 Años, BMG 1993
- Boleros, Voz Y Sentimiento, Sony Music 1996
- Un Mundo Una Esperanza, 1998
- Un Canto De México, Sony Music 2002
- Pablo Queriido, Universal Music 2003
- Angeles y Pequeños Diablitos, 2003
- El Pop Ha Muerto Viva El Pop, Universal Music 2005
- Reunidos Por Siempre, Universal Music 2005
- Chava Flores: Tributo De Sus Amigos, 2006
- Buenas Noches, Sony Music 2006
- 5x5=, 2006
- Quemar Las Naves, 2008
- La Morena, Fonarte 2008
- Sin Fecha De Caducidad, WEA 2009
- Huapanguenado, 2009
- Por Mi Culpa, WEA 2010
- Tengo Que Hablarte, Pnetagrama 2010
- Zona Preferente: En Vivo Desde El Auditorio Nacional, WEA 2012
- 33, 2013
- Zona Preferente: Mi Tributo Al Festival, WEA 2013
- Necesito Un Bolero, Sony Music 2014
- Mujer Divina, Sony Music 2014
- Caricia Urgente, 2015
- He for She, Sony Music 2015
- Primera Fila (En Vivo)—Las Tres Grandes, Sony Music 2016
- Rocío Dúrcal, Duetos, Sony Music 2016
- La Sonora Santanera en Su 60 Aniversario, Sony Music 2016
- Amar y Vivir, Universal Music 2017
