= Guadalupe Pineda =

Mexican singer

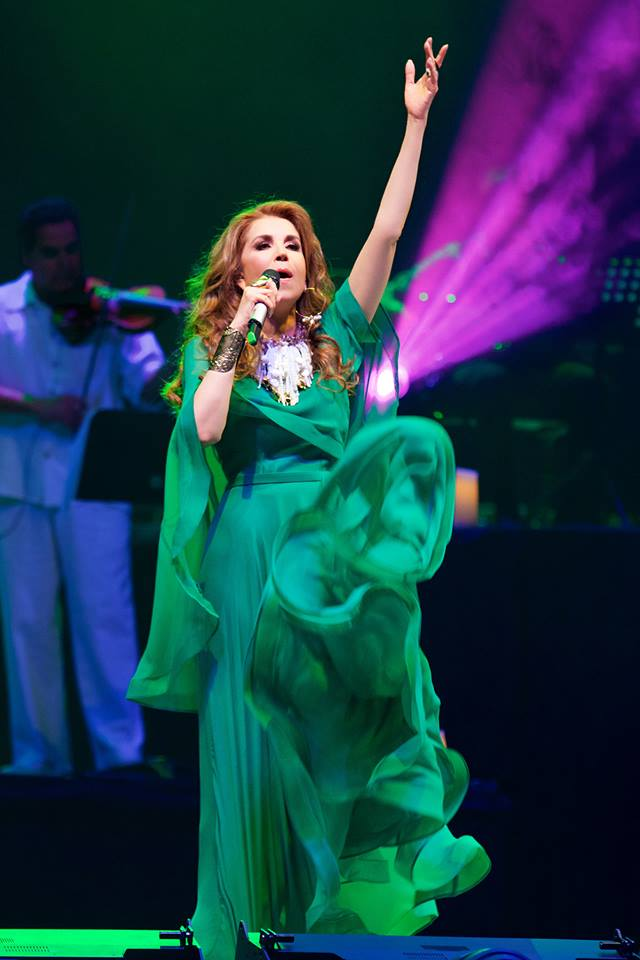
- Guadalupe Pineda live in concert.

Background information
- Born: Guadalupe Pineda Aguilar; February 23, 1955 (age 71); Guadalajara, Jalisco, Mexico
- Origin: Jalisco, Mexico
- Genres: Latin, Bolero, Ballad
- Occupation: Singer
- Years active: 1984–present
- Labels: Sony Music, InterSound
- Website: www.guadalupepineda.com.mx

Guadalupe Pineda Aguilar (born February 23, 1955) is a Mexican singer considered one of Mexico's grassroots musical icons. She is a recipient of the Latin Grammy Lifetime Achievement Award and a multi-Latin Grammy nominee, she has released more than 30 albums during her career covering various styles of music with sales over 14 million copies worldwide. In 1984, she recorded her breakthrough hit "Yolanda", also known as "Te Amo", composed by Pablo Milanes, selling more than 1.5 million copies. She primarily sings in Spanish, but has also sung in French, Italian, English, and Hebrew. She has been called the “Queen of Bolero”, but has also sung ballads, mariachi, tango, ranchera, and opera. Pineda has performed all over México, Latin America, and Spain, as well as in Europe and North America.

She has received gold and platinum certifications for some of her best-selling records, including "Un Poco Más" (1986), "20 Boleros de Siempre" (1990), "Costumbres" (1991), and a double-platinum certification for her album, "Arias de Opera" (2004). Her voice has transcended Mexican frontiers; she has participated in Mexican and international films, and also has been part of musical projects abroad such as "Buddha-bar" of France, or the "Monte Carlo" Italian collection, that have been edited and released all over the world. Her albums have been released in countries as far as Japan and she has performed on stage around the world (United States, Ireland, Spain, Italy, France, Colombia, Puerto Rico, Argentina, Central and South America). Some of her most notable shows have taken place in Paris in 2005, and at the historic Argentinian opera house, Teatro Colón of Buenos Aires, in November 2006. There have been also shows at some of the most important and recognized forums in Mexico, such as Palacio de Bellas Artes, Sala Nezahualcoyotl, Teatro de la Ciudad de Mexico, Teatro Degollado, El Teatro Juarez, and forums of the Cervantino Festival, as well in the most representative and famous civic square of the country, the Zocalo de la Ciudad de Mexico.

== Early life ==
Pineda is originally from Guadalajara, Mexico. Her mother, Josefina Aguilar Barraza, is a sister of singer and actor Antonio Aguilar. She is a first cousin of singers Antonio Aguilar, hijo and Pepe Aguilar.

== Career ==
She began her singing career while studying sociology at UNAM in Mexico City, leaving school to pursue a singing career full-time. At first, she was paid only thirty pesos plus food per performance. She learned Hebrew and Yiddish from the owner of one of the clubs she sang at. She began two groups called La propuesta and Sanampay with whom she recorded two records. Shortly afterwards, she went solo.

For the next ten years, she mostly performed at universities, public plazas, and other such venues until her first major hit Yolanda (Te amo) came in 1984 which sold 1.5 million copies in Mexico. This led to major venues in Mexico such as the Teatro de Bellas Artes, La Sala Nezahualcóyotl, the Auditorio Nacional, the Teatro de la Ciudad de México, the Teatro Degollado, the Teatro Juárez and the Festival Internacional Cervantino.

=== Appearances ===
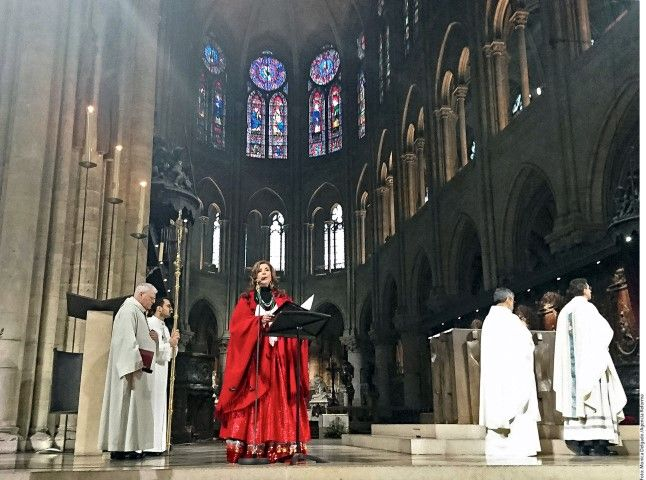
Guadalupe Pineda in Notre Dame

Pineda has appeared throughout Mexico and in various parts of the world, playing festivals, headlining her own tours and participating in other events. In Mexico, she appeared at the Festival International Cervantino, Palacio de Bellas Artes, the Auditorio Nacional, the Teatro Metropólitano, Teatro de la Ciudad "Esperanza Iris", Teatro Degollado and the Teatro Juárez. Other countries she has performed in include United States, Italy, Ireland, Spain, France, Puerto Rico, Argentina, Colombia, Venezuela and Argentina. She has appeared in festivals and venues such as the Rimini Italia Festival (1987), El casino de Madrid, Spain (1989), MGM Grand Las Vegas (1996), Teatro de Bellas Artes in Puerto Rico (2003), Saint Germain des Prés Cultural Festival, La maison de L’Amerique Latine (2005), El Teatro Colón in Buenos Aires (2006), the New York Theater and UIC Pavilion in Chicago (2007), Festival Internacional del Mariachi at the Santa Barbara Bowl (2008), Harris Theater in Chicago, Du Rond Point Theater in Paris, and Notre Dame (2009) . The singer recently presented her daughter, Mariana Gurrola Pineda, on stage as a new talent singing with her in duet.

=== Recordings ===
Pineda has recorded 30 albums, the last eight of which she produced herself under the Inter-sound label, with distribution by Televisa-Emi. Her first album as an independent producer was Arias de Ópera. Her albums have sold in various parts of the world in countries such as Japan, the U.S., Ireland, Spain, France, Italy, Venezuela, Argentina, Colombia as well as in various other countries in Latin America. She and/or her voice have appeared in movies such as Monjas coronadas by Mexican director Paul Leduc, Campanas rojas a joint Mexico/USSR production by Sergei Bondarchuk and Facing Windows from Italy directed by Ferzan Özpetek.

=== Awards ===
Pineda received a Gold certification with the hit album Un Poco Más in 1986, success that continued with 20 Boleros de Siempre in 1990 and Costumbres in 1991, both selling over 100,000 copies. In 2002, she became the only Mexican to be included in a discography compiled by the Buddha Bar of France. In 2004, her album Arias de Opera earned her a Double Platinum certification. In 2007, she received an award at the Cannes Festival for her work in French and charity work for the poor, from the Europa-Africa Committee. In 2009, she became the first Mexican to receive the Grand Prix Sacem Award in France for her album Francia con Sabor Latino.

In 2016, her album collaboration with Tania Libertad and Eugenia León titled Las Tres Grandes: Primera Fila, receives Gold certification in Mexico and a Latin Grammy nomination for Best Long Form Music Video.

In 2017, she receives the Latin Grammy Lifetime Achievement Award to honor her brilliant musical career and achievements.

=== Artistry ===
Pineda's voice is among the best-known in Mexico, with poet Alí Chumacero calling it “a voice of brilliant metal.” She has sung in various styles from bolero, tango, ranchero, ballads, merengué, jazz and opera. She has sung works by José Alfredo Jiménez, Agustín Lara, Violeta Parra, Pablo Milanés, Carlos Gardel, Edith Piaf, Charles Aznavour, Johannes Brahms and Franz Schubert . She has been called the “Queen of Bolero”, with the album Los Trios del Siglo including bolero classics such as Historia de un amor, Contigo, Sin ti, Rayito de Luna and Ódiame. She has performed operatic aria compositions by Verdi, Saint-Saëns, Bizet, Donizetti and Puccini. The Enamorarse Así album is a tribute to mariachi, filled with classics from that genre. A Flor de Piel pays homage to two Latin American singers, Olga Guillot and Mercedes Sosa, to whom she gave a tribute performance at Lincoln Center in New York City.

She has collaborated with Mireille Mathieu, Linda Ronstadt, Aida Cuevas, Pepe Aguilar, Tania Libertad, Eugenia León, Carlos Cuevas, La Sonora Santanera, Plácido Domingo, Pablo Milanés, Paquita la del Barrio, Maria León, Lila Downs, Ely Guerra, Rocío Dúrcal, Fernando de la Mora, Mercedes Sosa, Natalia LaFourcade, Antonio Aguilar, José Beltrán and Armando Manzanero. She has appeared with musical groups such as Los Tres Ases, Los Tres Reyes, and Los Dandys. In 2011, she sang with the Orquesta Filarmónica de la Universidad Nacional Autónoma de México (OFUNAM), at the Sala Nezahualcóyotl in Mexico City.

She mostly sings in Spanish but has sung in other languages as well. She recorded the song Cómo Fue in Italian. She also recorded an album called Un mundo de arrullos of children’s songs in various languages such as Portuguese, French, Italian, Hebrew, Maya and Gaelic. Other albums have contains songs in other languages such as Corcovado in Portuguese on the Gracias a la Vida album and Over the Rainbow in English. In 2009, she recorded the French language album called Francia con sabor latino. The album originally was only going to be marketed in France, but it was sold in Mexico reaching number one in sales for a period of eight weeks in the country. Though not a native speaker, she has studied the language since childhood. She sang selections from the album at a gala in Los Pinos in honor of French president Nicolas Sarkozy who was present.

== Discography ==
- Homenaje a Los Grandes Compositores (2018)
- Las Tres Grandes: Primera Fila (with Tania Libertad and Eugenia León) (2015) - Gold Certification
- Tiempo de amar (2015)
- En Bellas Artes, Vol. 2 (2013)
- En Bellas Artes, Vol. 1 (2013)
- A flor de piel (2011)
- Francia con Sabor Latino (2009) - Winner of the Grand Prix Sacem Award in France
- La voz en vivo, Vol.2 (2007)
- La voz en vivo, Vol 1 (2007)
- Gracias a la vida (2006)
- Un mundo de arrullos
- Canciones de mi tierra (2004)
- Arias de ópera (2002) - Double Platinum Certification
- Con los tríos del siglo (2000)
- Vestida de besos (1998)
- Así como tú (1997)
- Enamorarse así (1994)
- De nuevo sola (1993)
- Costumbres (1991) - Gold Certification
- Boleros de siempre (1990) - Gold Certification
- Eclipse de Mar
- Un Canto a México
- Para Comenzar
- Solamente una vez
- Todo cambia (1980)
- Un poco más (1985) - Gold Certification
- Te amo (1984) - Platinum Certification
- Guadalupe Pineda (1981)
- Guadalupe Pineda y Carlos Díaz “Caito”
- Coral Terrestre (Grupo Sanampay)
- Yo te nombro (Grupo Sanampay)
