= Las Hermanas Márquez =

- Origin: Puerto Padre, Cuba
- Genres: Trova, Son, Bolero, Guaracha
- Years active: 1933–1950s
- Past members: Caridad "Cusa" Márquez; Albertina "Trina" Márquez; Nerza Márquez; Zaida Márquez; Alba Márquez; Esther Márquez; Olga Márquez

Las Hermanas Márquez, known as "Las Pimentosas", were a Cuban vocal trio whose artistic career began in 1933 in Puerto Padre, Cuba. They are regarded as the first documented female vocal trio in Latin America. The original formation consisted of Caridad (Cusa), first voice and guitar; Albertina (Trina), second voice; and Nerza, third voice and maracas. After extensive performances and tours throughout the Caribbean and Mexico, the sisters settled permanently in the United States in 1951. In 2010 they received the Latin Grammy Lifetime Achievement Award.

== Biography ==
The Márquez sisters were born into a large musical family. Their father, Alberto Márquez Gómez, was a guitarist, percussionist, and respected music teacher who founded the Municipal Band of Puerto Padre in 1914. Their mother, Elena Reyes, was a composer and lyricist. The couple had fourteen children, eleven of them daughters. Six of the sisters performed at various times under the name "Las Hermanas Márquez", occasionally dividing into two separate trios.

Trina and Cusa learned guitar in childhood. They made their first public appearance in 1931 in Puerto Padre and nearby towns. The trio became widely known in 1933 after successful performances in Santiago de Cuba, where they also began appearing on radio. Their style featured three close harmonies with the characteristic sound of eastern Cuba, performing guarachas, sones, and boleros accompanied by guitars. Over the years, several sisters participated publicly: Zaida (voice), Alba (voice), Esther (guitar), Albertina (claves and voice), Caridad (first voice and guitar), Nerza (voice), and Olga (voice).

In Santiago, they frequently performed with the orchestra of Mariano Mercerón. In 1937 they moved to Havana, appearing in theaters such as the Martí and the América, and on stations including RHC, CMQ, and Radio Lavín. Maestro Ernesto Lecuona presented them in a well‑known program featuring six pianos and leading Cuban artists of the era, including Esther Borja, Miguelito Valdés, Bola de Nieve, Orlando de la Rosa, and Rita Montaner. In 1941 they recorded their first disc for RCA Victor.

During these years they were managed by Heliodoro García, one of Cuba’s most prominent impresarios, who organized tours throughout the Caribbean, including Puerto Rico, the Dominican Republic, Haiti, and Venezuela. Between 1944 and 1945 they toured Mexico several times and appeared in the film Pervertida (1946), directed by José Díaz Morales.

In 1949, Nerza Márquez married and temporarily retired from performing, with Olga joining the trio. Olga later retired after her own marriage, and Nerza returned. In 1951 the group traveled to the United States for a four‑week engagement in New York and decided to remain there permanently, continuing their career in New York and along the East Coast. They performed at venues such as Chateau Madrid and the Lou Booth club in New Jersey, and at major New York auditoriums including the Palladium, the Palace, and the Roseland. They also appeared in cabarets in Las Vegas and Atlantic City.

In 1965 they recorded the LP Las Hermanas Márquez vuelven, but the anticipated comeback did not continue. They entered a long period with few public appearances as they cared for their aging and ill parents. Trina later returned to the stage in 1990 with her sister Nerza, and both continued performing; Trina also continued composing.

The sisters were later rediscovered by Paquito D’Rivera, whose mother encouraged him to meet them after he had read about the group in Cuban music histories. Living quietly in New Jersey, they were persuaded by D’Rivera, who had also helped revive the career of Bebo Valdés, to return to performing and record a new album.

They recorded their first CD (their earlier releases had been on vinyl) in New York in January 2004, produced by Dania Dévora and José Luis Rupérez. The recording was completed in ten hours, an unusually short time for a full album. Rupérez and D’Rivera later produced a special edition book‑CD featuring archival photographs and a selection of boleros, guarachas, and chachachás by composers such as Fernando Ortiz, Tereso Valdés, Bobby Collazo, and Ernesto Lecuona, along with several of the sisters’ own compositions. The CD was pre‑selected for four Grammy Award categories in 2004. Following the release, Las Hermanas Márquez performed in Tenerife, Cáceres, and Madrid. A musical documentary, Las hermanas Márquez, directed by Sergio Mondelo and José Luis Rupérez, was also released in 2004.

On 11 November 2010, at the Mandalay Bay Events Center in Las Vegas, during the 11th Annual Latin Grammy Awards, they received the Latin Grammy Lifetime Achievement Award.
