= Tania Libertad =

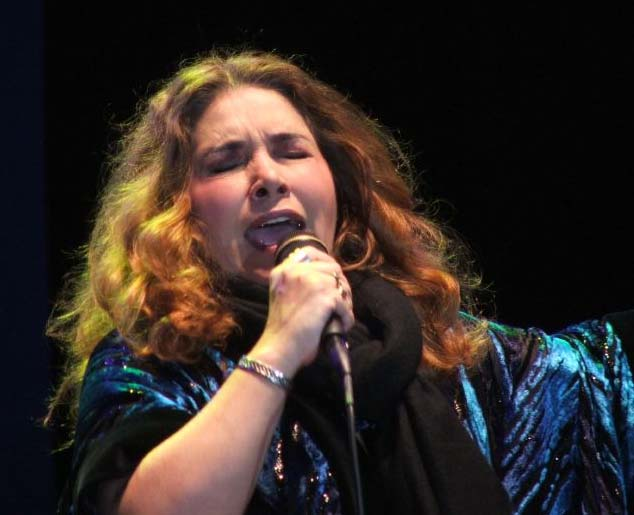
- Tania Libertad performing at the Latin Grammys 2014.

Background information
- Born: Tania Libertad de Souza Zúñiga; October 24, 1952 (age 73); Zaña, Lambayeque Region, Peru
- Origin: Lima, Peru
- Genres: Ballad, Bolero, Música criolla, Nueva Trova, Mariachi
- Occupation: Singer
- Years active: 1959 - present
- Label: Sony Music

Tania Libertad de Souza Zúñiga (born October 24, 1952) known professionally as Tania Libertad, is a Peruvian-Mexican singer in the World Music genre.

Libertad was named an Ambassador for Peace by UNESCO, Comendadora by the Peruvian government, a member of the Order of Rio Branco by the Brazilian government, among other honors. In 2009, she received the Latin Grammy Lifetime Achievement Award for musical excellence. With more than 44 albums and sales of over 12 million copies, her work is widely known throughout the Americas, Europe and Africa. She has performed concerts in France, Italy, Spain, Portugal, Belgium, Germany, Switzerland, Holland, England, Morocco, Angola, Senegal, the United States, Peru, Ecuador, Puerto Rico, Venezuela, the Dominican Republic, Honduras, Uruguay, Colombia, Costa Rica, Guatemala, Panama, El Salvador, Argentina, Brazil and Mexico. The year 2012 marked 50 years as a performer with two sold-out performances at the Palacio de Bellas Artes in Mexico City, launching a tour throughout Latin America.

== Early life ==
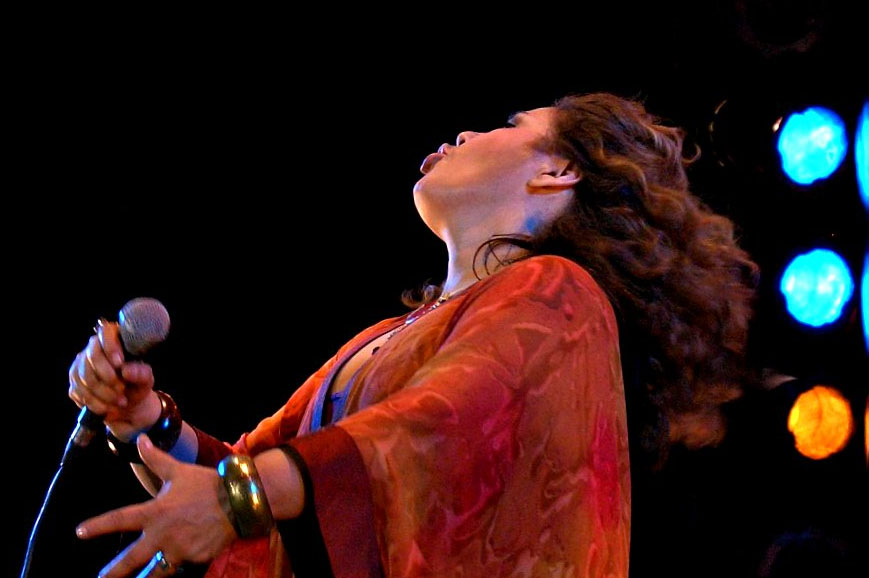
Tania Libertad in concert at the Feria Internacional de Libro in Guadalajara in November 2005

Libertad was born in Zaña, a small town in the Lambayeque Region on the coast of northern Peru and was raised in the regional capital of Chiclayo. Her mother was a nurse of indigenous descent, and her father was a policeman of Portuguese descent with very traditional views on gender roles. She grew up with eight older brothers. She found growing up in such a male-dominated environment difficult.

She first sang on stage at the age of five in Chiclayo. Because her parents worked long hours, her family didn't know she was singing. In early performances, she sang traditional Peruvian and Mexican songs, including waltzes and boleros. When her father discovered her musical talent, he had her sing songs he had written to his mistresses; she found these songs were of poor quality and helped her distinguish between good and bad music. She further developed her repertoire with traditional and rock music on the radio, and recalls singing in competitions at age seven, knowing 300 boleros by eight, and making records by nine.

== Career ==
As a teenager, Libertad moved to the Peruvian capital of Lima. She sang in nightclubs there, and her father worked as her manager. She was soon offered a contract with RCA Victor and had her first national hit in Peru, "La Contamanina." While Libertad pursued her musical career she convinced her father to let her study engineering at the university. Because her father wanted to study what one of her brothers did, she studied science and engineering in fisheries. She never used this education later in life, but she credits her university experience with exposing her to other people who were interested in art and left-wing politics, especially anti-war movements.

During this time, Libertad's interest in Afro-Peruvian music, which flourished in her native north, grew. The nationalist Peruvian government wanted to encourage expressions of Peruvian culture, going so far as to establish an Afro-Peruvian ballet company. She also became uncomfortable singing in nightclubs due to the sexism and racism prevalent there, which motivated her to begin singing socially conscious music in universities and union halls. But as her father became more protective of her as a teenager, he wanted her to give up her musical career, so at the age of 20, she ran away from home and lived with friends for two weeks until her father accepted her desire to sing full-time.

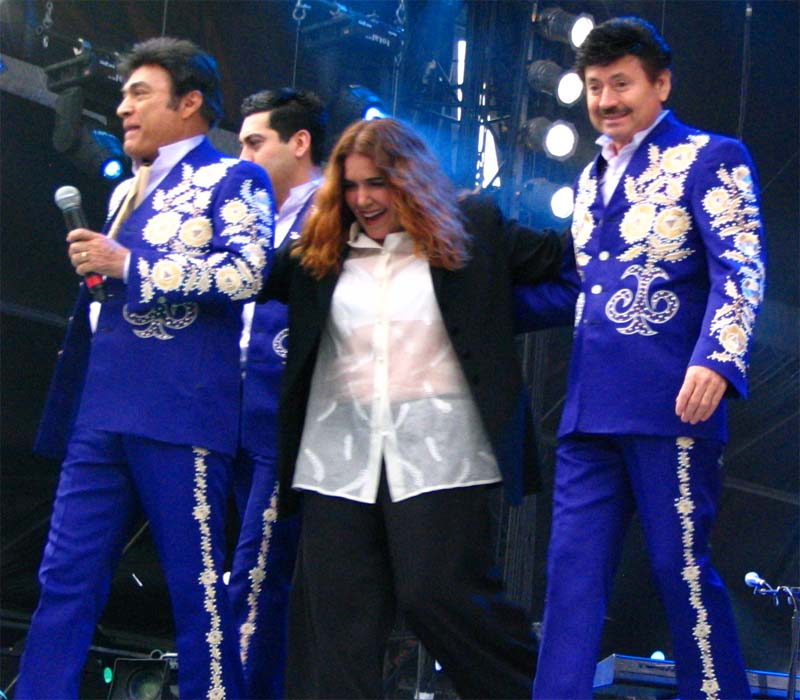
Tania Libertad with Los Tigres del Norte on 17 May 2007

In 1976, Libertad began to travel abroad, and was inspired by the musical traditions and political consciousness she encountered in the places she visited, such as Cuba. Unsuccessful in Peru with her new brand of music, she decided to emigrate to Mexico. She arrived there penniless and bonded with Latin American artists who fled their home countries for political reasons. Soon, she found her first job at the Blanquita Theatre in Mexico City. There, Libertad was given a contract by PolyGram singing trova, Afro-Peruvian music, salsa, and bolero. In 1985, she released her first album of boleros. She has lived in Mexico since, and has sung in over 20 countries on every inhabited continent.

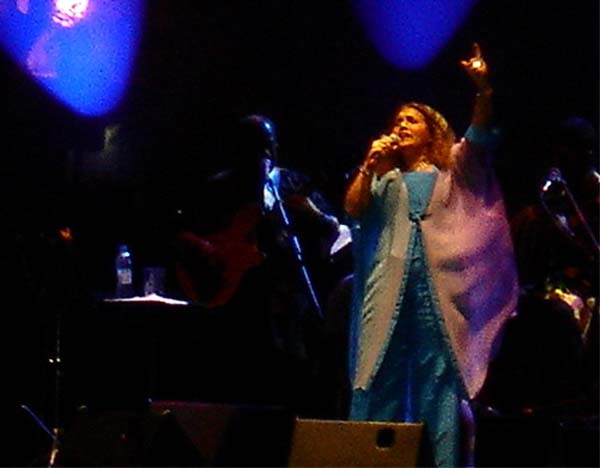
Tania Libertad sings at the Cultural Festival in Zacatecas on 13 April 2006

During her career, Libertad shared the stage with other international artists such as Mercedes Sosa, Joan Manuel Serrat, Silvio Rodríguez, Pablo Milanés, Alberto Cortez, León Gieco, Juan Carlos Baglietto, Guadalupe Pineda, Chico Buarque, Gal Costa, Alfredo Zitarrosa, Cesária Évora, Vicente Fernández, Eugenia León, Chayanne, Juan Gabriel, Miguel Bosé, Plácido Domingo, Armando Manzanero, Simón Díaz, Willie Colón, Tito Puente, Oscar Chávez, Iván Lins, Riccardo Cocciante, Soledad Pastorutti, Marco Antonio Muñiz, Soledad Bravo, Amália Rodrigues, Susana Rinaldi, Phil Manzanera, Lucha Villa and the group Inti Illimani, among others.

The Nobel Prize winning Portuguese author Jose Saramago writes of her work:

"The first time I heard Tania Libertad sing, it was a revelation from on high - from a place where only a naked voice might go, alone in the world, unaccompanied by any instrument. Tania was singing the Rafael Alberti composition "La Paloma" a capella, and each note touched a string in my soul until I was completely dazzled." - José Saramago

== Influences ==
Despite not being of African descent, Libertad is inspired by the Afro-Peruvian music indigenous to the area of Peru in which she was born, an area primarily populated by descendants of enslaved Africans. Her albums Costa Negra and Color Negro, from 2003 and 2004 respectively, are recordings of Afro-Peruvian songs.

Her appreciation of Afro-Antillan music has been reflected in works which reference Trova and Nueva canción, and have included arranged renditions of compositions by Silvio Rodriguez.

Additionally, she has collaborated with Armando Manzanero.

== Personal life ==
Libertad is married to a businessman and has a son; they live in Mexico City.

She considers herself a citizen of the world, and ascribes to the ideas of Simón Bolívar, especially that Latin America should be a unified body without borders. She identifies as anti-war, but does not like to be labeled a protest singer.

== Discography ==
Libertad has recorded 44 albums with more than 12 million copies sold.

- Tania Libertad
- Soy Peruana
- La Contamanina
- Mejor que nunca
- La dulce voz de Tania Libertad
- El mismo Puerto
- Concierto en la voz de Tania Libertad
- Hits
- Hits Vol. II
- Alfonsina y el mar
- Lo inolvidable de Chabuca Granda
- Como una campana de cristal
- Boleros
- Nuevamente Boleros
- Me voy pa'la pachanga
- Trovadicción
- Mucho corazón
- Razón de Vivir (duet with Djavan)
- Tania canta a José Alfredo Jiménez (duet with Vicente Fernandez)
- Boleros hoy (duet Armando Manzanero, Miguel Bose, Ivan Lins and Azucar Moreno)
- México Lindo y Querido
- África en América
- La Libertad de Manzanero
- Amar Amando
- Tania y su sabrosa Libertad
- Himno al amor
- Mujeres apasionadas
- Tomate esta botella conmigo
- Armando la Libertad
- Blue Note, Live in New York
- La vida, ese paréntesis (duet with Joan Manuel Serrat and Willie Colon)
- Arias de Ópera, ¿Y... por que no?
- Alfonsina Y El Mar XX Años
- Costa Negra
- 20 De Colección
- Negro Color
- Tania 50 años de Libertad
- Manzanero a Tres Pistas
- Desarmando a Tania
- Por Ti y Por Mi
- Las Tres Grandes: Primera Fila with Guadalupe Pineda and Eugenia León
- Jose Alfredo y Yo
