= Latin Grammy Lifetime Achievement Award =

Special award presented by The Latin Recording Academy to performers

- Awarded for: "contributions of outstanding artistic significance to Latin music"
- Presented by: The Latin Recording Academy
- First award: 2004
- Website: www.latingrammy.com

The Latin Grammy Lifetime Achievement Award is a special Latin Grammy Award presented annually by the Latin Recording Academy, to commend performers "who have made contributions of outstanding artistic significance to Latin music". Award recipients are honored during "Latin Grammy Week", a string of galas just prior to the annual Latin Grammy Awards ceremony.

Since its inception in 2004, the award has been presented to musicians originating from Ibero-America. (Note: Ibero-America as defined by the Latin Recording Academy encompasses Latin America, Spain, Portugal, and the Latino population in Canada and the United States.) Armando Manzanero, Linda Ronstadt, and Joan Baez have also received the Grammy Lifetime Achievement Award. Joe Arroyo is the only artist to have received the award posthumously, in 2011, four months after his death. In 2014, Carlos do Carmo became the first artist from Portugal to receive a Latin Grammy Award when he was honored with it. Like the Person of the Year and Trustees Award, the honor was not presented in 2020 due to the COVID-19 pandemic.

== Recipients ==
Recipients of the Latin Grammy Lifetime Achievement Award
| Year^{[I]} | Image | Recipient | Occupation(s)^{[II]} | Nationality | Ref. |
|---|---|---|---|---|---|
| 2004 | A man wearing a military uniform. | Antonio Aguilar | Singer songwriter actor film producer | Mexico | |
| 2004 | A man wearing a light blue shirt. | Roberto Carlos | Singer songwriter | Brazil | |
| 2004 | | Willie Colón | Singer trombonist songwriter producer | United States | |
| 2004 | José José | José José | Singer | Mexico | |
| 2004 | A woman with long hair is facing left. | Mercedes Sosa | Singer | Argentina | |
| 2005 | Rocío Dúrcal | Rocío Dúrcal | Singer actress | Spain | |
| 2005 | — | Generoso Jiménez | Trombonist arranger | Cuba | |
| 2005 | A man wearing a white shirt and sunglasses is holding a microphone. | Jorge Ben Jor | Singer songwriter | Brazil | |
| 2005 | A man is playing a piano | Sérgio Mendes | Pianist composer arranger producer | Brazil | |
| 2005 | Johnny Pacheco | Johnny Pacheco | Composer multi-instrumentalist producer | Dominican Republic | |
| 2005 | A man is facing the camera | Sandro | Singer actor | Argentina | |
| 2006 | A man wearing a black shirt and glasses is holding a microphone | León Gieco | Singer songwriter | Argentina | |
| 2006 | A woman in a white dress is performing on stage | Graciela | Singer | Cuba | |
| 2006 | Two men are standing next to each other | César Camargo Mariano | Pianist songwriter producer | Brazil | |
| 2006 | — | Richie Ray & Bobby Cruz | Pianist singer (respectively) songwriters | Puerto Rico; United States | |
| 2006 | A woman on stage is holding a microphone | Paloma San Basilio | Singer | Spain | |
| 2006 | — | Alberto Vázquez | Singer actor | Mexico | |
| 2006 | A man wearing a tuxedo is holding a microphone | Johnny Ventura | Singer songwriter | Dominican Republic | |
| 2007 | A man is smiling at the camera | Alberto Cortez | Singer songwriter | Argentina | |
| 2007 | A man wearing a tuxedo is looking towards the right | Lucho Gatica | Singer | Chile | |
| 2007 | A woman wearing a yellow shirt is facing left | Olga Guillot | Singer actress | Cuba | |
| 2007 | Three men performing on stage | Os Paralamas do Sucesso | Rock, reggae, ska, pop trio | Brazil | |
| 2007 | A group of men performinn at a concert | Los Tigres del Norte | Norteño music quintet | Mexico | |
| 2007 | A women wearing a dress is singing | Chavela Vargas | Singer | Mexico | |
| 2008 | A women wearing a white dress is holding a microphone | Vikki Carr | Singer | United States | |
| 2008 | | Cheo Feliciano | Singer songwriter | Puerto Rico | |
| 2008 | A woman is performing on a stage and is facing right | Astrud Gilberto | Singer | Brazil | |
| 2008 | | Angélica María | Singer actress | Mexico; United States | |
| 2008 | A woman wearing a blue dress is smiling at the camera | María Dolores Pradera | Singer actress | Spain | |
| 2008 | A woman in a dress is facing the camera | Estela Raval | Singer | Argentina | |
| 2009 | A man wearing a tuxedo is playing the congas | Candido Camero | Conguero | Cuba | |
| 2009 | A woman with red hair is smiling | Beth Carvalho | Singer | Brazil | |
| 2009 | A man wearing a blue suit is holding a microphone | Charly García | Pianist singer songwriter | Argentina | |
| 2009 | | Tania Libertad | Singer | Peru; Mexico | |
| 2009 | — | Marco Antonio Muñiz | Singer | Mexico | |
| 2009 | — | Juan Romero | Songwriter | Mexico | |
| 2010 | A man wearing a cap is sitting on a bench | João Donato | Singer-songwriter pianist | Brazil | |
| 2010 | — | Las Hermanas Márquez | Singers | Cuba | |
| 2010 | Armando Manzanero | Armando Manzanero | Composer | Mexico | |
| 2010 | A man is on a platform and holding a microphone | Joseíto Mateo | Singer | Dominican Republic | |
| 2010 | | Jorge Oñate | Singer | Colombia | |
| 2010 | A woman with curly hair is looking to the side. | Susana Rinaldi | Singer | Argentina | |
| 2011 | A man wearing a suit is looking at the camera. | Joe Arroyo | Singer songwriter | Colombia | |
| 2011 | A woman in a white dress is holding a microphone. | Gal Costa | Singer | Brazil | |
| 2011 | A man is sitting on a stool playing a guitar. | José Feliciano | Singer songwriter | Puerto Rico | |
| 2011 | A man is wearing a black suit and sunglasses and is playing an electric guitar. | Álex Lora | Singer songwriter | Mexico | |
| 2011 | Five men standing on a stage. | Les Luthiers | Humorous group musicians | Argentina | |
| 2011 | A man is wearing a black suit and sunglasses and is playing an electric guitar. | Rubén Rada | Singer songwriter percussionist | Uruguay | |
| 2011 | A woman wearing a white sleeveless shirt and pink pants is singing. | Linda Ronstadt | Singer | United States | |
| 2012 | A woman with brown hair is wearing a purple blouse performing behind a microphone. | Luz Casal | Singer | Spain | |
| 2012 | A man wearing a black scarf is sitting in a recording studio. | Leo Dan | Singer songwriter | Argentina | |
| 2012 | A woman is wearing glasses, a white dress, and earring is facing the camera. | Rita Moreno | Singer actress | Puerto Rico; United States | |
| 2012 | A man with hair braids is wearing sunglasses and playing a guitar. | Milton Nascimento | Singer songwriter | Brazil | |
| 2012 | | Daniela Romo | Singer | Mexico | |
| 2012 | A man wearing a fedora is playing the congas | Poncho Sanchez | Percussionist | United States | |
| 2012 | A man in a black shirt is playing a guitar next to a table | Toquinho | Songwriter guitar player | Brazil | |
| 2013 | A man with a thick mustache is wearing light blue shirt. | Oscar D'León | Singer musician | Venezuela | |
| 2013 | A man in a black shirt is holding an award on his left | Juan Formell | Musician; Arranger; Songwriter | Cuba | |
| 2013 | A bearded man is wearing a black shirt | Roberto Menescal | Musician songwriter producer | Brazil | |
| 2013 | A woman wearing a traditional dress is holding a microphone | Totó la Momposina | Singer interpreter | Colombia | |
| 2013 | A man in a white tuxedo is facing left holding a microphone | Palito Ortega | Singer actor producer | Argentina | |
| 2013 | | Eddie Palmieri | Pianist music director musician | United States | |
| 2013 | A man in a black suit has a medallion on his necklace | Miguel Ríos | Singer songwriter actor producer | Spain | |
| 2014 | A man is looking towards the right | Willy Chirino | Singer songwriter musician producer | Cuba; United States | |
| 2014 | A man wearing a turtleneck shirt is holding a cellphone | César Costa | Singer actor producer radio host author mentor | Mexico | |
| 2014 | A man in a black tuxedo is holding a microphone and is facing right | Carlos do Carmo | Singer | Portugal | |
| 2014 | Two men in tuxedos are climbing down the stairs from an airplane | Dúo Dinámico | Singers composers producers actors | Spain | |
| 2014 | A band is performing at a stage in front of the White House | Los Lobos | Musical group | United States | |
| 2014 | A woman with blonde hair is facing the camera | Valeria Lynch | Singer actress | Argentina | |
| 2014 | A man is wearing a black jacket and is facing left | Ney Matogrosso | Singer | Brazil | |
| 2015 | A man with long hair is wearing a cowboy | Gato Barbieri | Saxophonist | Argentina | |
| 2015 | A woman is wearing a white dress and holding a microphone, her eyes are closed | Ana Belén | Singer | Spain | |
| 2015 | — | Ángela Carrasco | Singer | Dominican Republic | |
| 2015 | A man is wearing a violet shirt and is performing in front a microphone | Djavan | Singer songwriter guitarist | Brazil | |
| 2015 | A three men are singing with a musicians playing in the background | El Gran Combo de Puerto Rico | Salsa music orchestra | Puerto Rico | |
| 2015 | A man is wearing black and is facing someone on the left | Víctor Manuel | Singer | Spain | |
| 2015 | A man is wearing a black jacket and glasses and is holding a microphone | Pablo Milanés | Singer songwriter guitarist | Cuba | |
| 2016 | | El Consorcio | Vocal group | Spain | |
| 2016 | | Eugenia León | Singer | Mexico | |
| 2016 | | Ricardo Montaner | Singer songwriter | Argentina; Venezuela | |
| 2016 | | Ednita Nazario | Singer | Puerto Rico | |
| 2016 | | Piero | Singer songwriter | Argentina | |
| 2017 | | Lucecita Benítez | Singer | Puerto Rico | |
| 2017 | | João Bosco | Singer musician | Brazil | |
| 2017 | | Ilan Chester | Singer songwriter | Venezuela | |
| 2017 | | Víctor Heredia | Singer | Argentina | |
| 2017 | | Los del Río | Music duo | Spain | |
| 2017 | | Guadalupe Pineda | Singer | Mexico | |
| 2017 | | Cuco Valoy | Singer | Dominican Republic | |
| 2018 | | Erasmo Carlos | Singer-songwriter | Brazil | |
| 2018 | | Dyango | Singer musician | Spain | |
| 2018 | | Andy Montañez | Singer | Puerto Rico | |
| 2018 | | José María Napoleón | Singer-songwriter | Mexico | |
| 2018 | | Chucho Valdés | Pianist bandleader composer arranger | Cuba | |
| 2018 | | Wilfrido Vargas | Bandleader singer | Dominican Republic | |
| 2018 | | Yuri | Singer | Mexico | |
| 2019 | | Eva Ayllón | Singer | Peru | |
| 2019 | | Joan Baez | Singer songwriter | United States | |
| 2019 | | José Cid | Singer songwriter | Portugal | |
| 2019 | — | Lupita D'Alessio | Singer actress | Mexico | |
| 2019 | | Hugo Fattoruso | Keyboardist singer composer | Uruguay | |
| 2019 | | Pimpinela | Music duo | Argentina | |
| 2019 | | Omara Portuondo | Singer dancer | Cuba | |
| 2019 | | José Luis Rodríguez | Singer | Venezuela | |
| 2020 | No award due to the COVID-19 pandemic | | | | |
| 2021 | | Martinho da Vila | Singer | Brazil | |
| 2021 | | Emmanuel | Singer songwriter | Mexico | |
| 2021 | | Pete Escovedo | Musician | United States | |
| 2021 | | Sheila E. | Musician | United States | |
| 2021 | | Fito Páez | Singer songwriter musician | Argentina | |
| 2021 | | Milly Quezada | Singer | Dominican Republic | |
| 2021 | | Joaquín Sabina | Singer songwriter | Spain | |
| 2021 | | Gilberto Santa Rosa | Singer | Puerto Rico | |
| 2022 | | Rosario Flores | Singer | Spain | |
| 2022 | | Myriam Hernández | Singer; Songwriter | Chile | |
| 2022 | | Rita Lee | Singer; Songwriter | Brazil | |
| 2022 | | Amanda Miguel | Singer | Argentina | |
| 2022 | | Yordano | Singer; Songwriter | Venezuela; Italy | |
| 2023 | | Carmen Linares | Singer | Spain | |
| 2023 | | Manuel Mijares | Singer; Songwriter | Mexico | |
| 2023 | | Arturo Sandoval | musician | Cuba; United States | |
| 2023 | | Simone | Singer | Brazil | |
| 2023 | | Soda Stereo | Rock musical group | Argentina | |
| 2023 | | Ana Torroja | Singer songwriter | Spain | |
| 2024 | | Albita | Singer | Cuba | |
| 2024 | | Lolita Flores | Singer | Spain | |
| 2024 | | Alejandro Lerner | Singer songwriter | Argentina | |
| 2024 | | Los Ángeles Azules | Cumbia musical group | Mexico | |
| 2024 | | Draco Rosa | Singer songwriter | Puerto Rico | |
| 2024 | | Lulu Santos | Singer songwriter | Brazil | |
| 2025 | | Susana Baca | Singer | Peru | |
| 2025 | | Enrique Bunbury | Singer | Spain | |
| 2025 | | Ivan Lins | Singer songwriter | Brazil | |
| 2025 | | Pandora | Musical vocal trio | Mexico | |
| 2025 | | Olga Tañón | Singer | Puerto Rico | |
| 2026 | | Alaska | Singer | Mexico; Spain | |
| 2026 | | Francisco Céspedes | Singer songwriter | Cuba | |
| 2026 | | Lila Downs | Singer songwriter | Mexico | |
| 2026 | | Daniela Mercury | Singer songwriter | Brazil | |
| 2026 | | Chichí Peralta | Singer songwriter | Dominican Republic | |

^{^[I]} Each year is linked to an article about the Latin Grammy Awards ceremony of that year.

^{^[II]} The artists occupation(s) are listed on the Special Awards page on the Latin Grammy Award website.

== See also ==
- Billboard Latin Music Lifetime Achievement Award
- Grammy Lifetime Achievement Award
- Latin Grammy Trustees Award
- List of Latin Grammy Awards categories
- List of lifetime achievement awards
- Lo Nuestro Excellence Award
