= Latin Recording Academy Person of the Year =

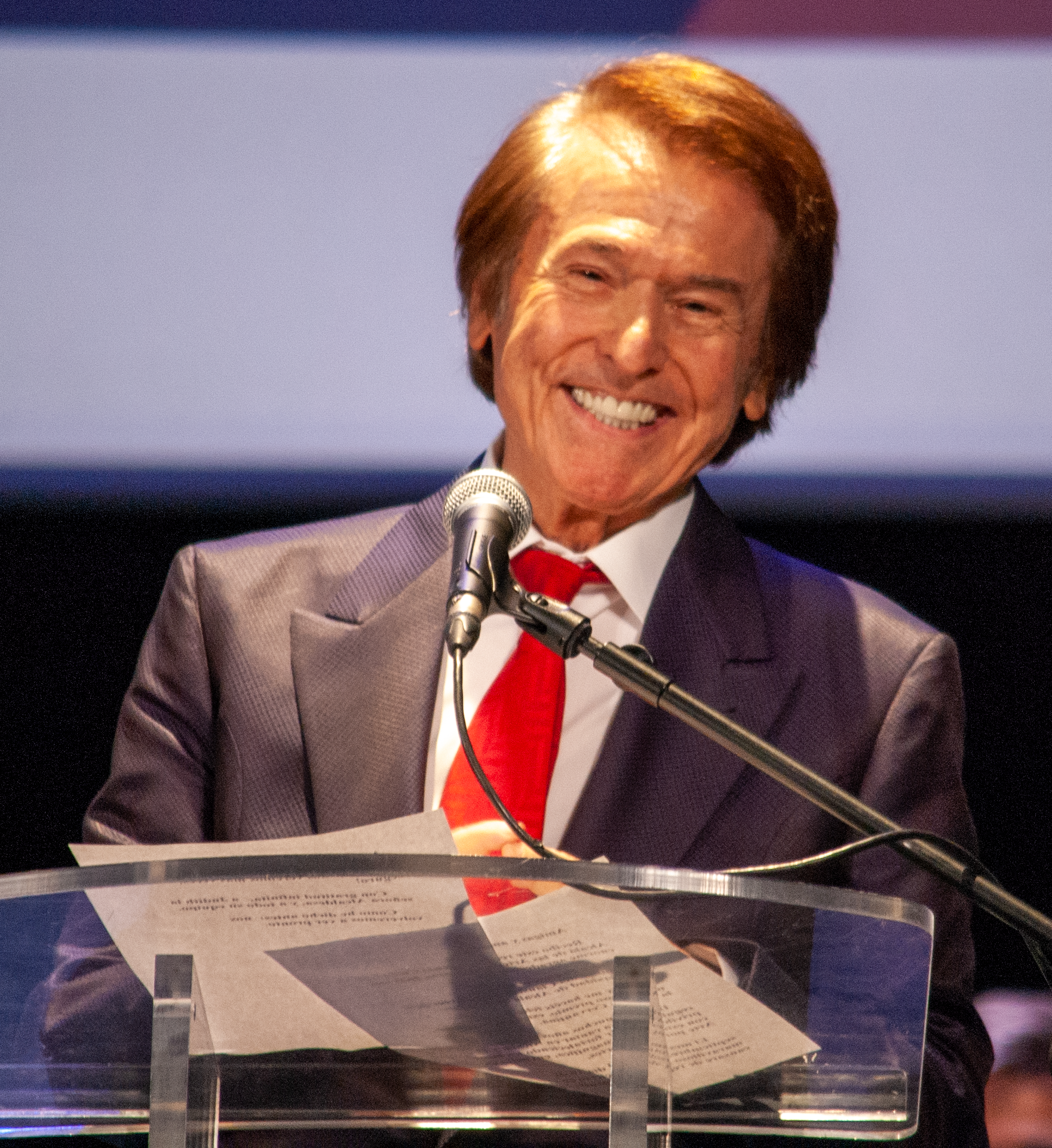
- Raphael is the most recent recipient
- Awarded for: Artistic achievement in the Latin music industry and dedication to philanthropy
- Presented by: Latin Recording Academy
- First award: 2000
- Currently held by: Raphael (2025)
- Website: www.latingrammy.com

The Latin Recording Academy Person of the Year is an award presented annually by the Latin Recording Academy, the same organization that distributes the Latin Grammy Awards, to commend musicians for their "artistic achievements in the Latin music industry as well as their humanitarian efforts". Award recipients are honored during "Latin Grammy Week", a string of galas just prior to the annual Latin Grammy Awards ceremony. Until 2023, the award was only presented to artists of Ibero-American heritage, when Laura Pausini became the first Italian artist to be presented with the honor.

The award was first presented to Cuban American musician and producer Emilio Estefan in 2000 for increasing public awareness of Latin music. Eight years later his wife, singer Gloria Estefan, became the first female award recipient. She had previously received the MusiCares Person of the Year award in 1994, a similar honor presented by the National Academy of Recording Arts and Sciences, the same organization that distributes the Grammy Awards.

Spanish singer Julio Iglesias received the second award in 2001. Ranchera singer Vicente Fernández won the award in 2002 for donating ticket proceeds to the National Hispanic Scholarship Fund. Brazilian singer Gilberto Gil received the award the following year. The 2004 award went to Carlos Santana, who founded the Milagro Foundation in 1998 with his wife, which "supports young people involved in the arts, health and education". Mexican singer José José, known as the "Prince of Song", received the award in 2005. Puerto Rican entertainer Ricky Martin received the award in 2006 after his foundation launched the People for Children project, which works to eliminate human trafficking. Juan Luis Guerra, known for popularizing merengue and bachata music, received the award the following year for founding a non-profit organization that has helped build hospitals, churches and recreation centers in the Dominican Republic. The 2009 award recipient, Juan Gabriel, is known for donating concert proceeds to his favorite children's foster homes and for founding Semjase, an orphanage for approximately 120 children. Spanish tenor Plácido Domingo received the 2010 award for founding Operalia, The World Opera Competition (an annual international voice competition), for raising millions of dollars through benefit concerts for disaster victims, for helping to establish a hospital in Lerma, Mexico State, and for additional goodwill efforts. The Person of the Year gala, along with the Lifetime Achievement and the Trustees awards, was not presented in 2020 due to the COVID-19 pandemic.

Since its inception, the award has been presented to musicians originating from Brazil, Colombia, Cuba, the Dominican Republic, Mexico, Puerto Rico, Spain, Panama, Italy, and the United States.

== Recipients ==
Year^{[I]}	Image	Recipient	Lifetime	Nationality	Ref.
2000		Emilio Estefan	b. 1953	Cuba; United States	
2001	A man in a white dress shirt.	Julio Iglesias	b. 1943	Spain	
2002	A man with white hair wearing a black coat with yellow accents.	Vicente Fernández	1940-2021	Mexico	
2003	A man with dreadlocks holding a guitar and standing behind a microphone stand.	Gilberto Gil	b. 1942	Brazil	
2004	A man wearing a greet hat and shirt, looking down at the guitar he is holding.	Carlos Santana	b. 1947	Mexico; United States	
2005		José José	1948-2019	Mexico	
2006		Ricky Martin	b. 1971	Puerto Rico; United States	
2007		Juan Luis Guerra	b. 1957	Dominican Republic	
2008	A woman in black clothing, standing in front of a red curtain and wearing gold jewelry.	Gloria Estefan	b. 1957	Cuba; United States	
2009	A man in a blue suit holding a microphone. He is smiling and extending his arm towards the back of a stage, where two men are playing stringed instruments.	Juan Gabriel	1950-2016	Mexico	
2010	A man in a formal suit standing behind a podium.	Plácido Domingo	b. 1941	Spain	
2011	Shakira	Shakira	b. 1977	Colombia	
2012		Caetano Veloso	b. 1942	Brazil	
2013		Miguel Bosé	b. 1956	Spain; Italy; Colombia; Panama	
2014		Joan Manuel Serrat	b. 1943	Spain	
2015		Roberto Carlos	b. 1941	Brazil	
2016		Marc Anthony	b. 1968	United States	
2017		Alejandro Sanz	b. 1968	Spain	
2018		Maná; Fher Olvera; Alex Gonzalez; Sergio Vallín; Juan Calleros	1986–present b.1959 b.1969 b.1972 b.1962	Mexico; United States	
2019		Juanes	b. 1972	Colombia	
2020	No award due to the COVID-19 pandemic				
2021		Rubén Blades	b. 1948	Panama	
2022		Marco Antonio Solís	b. 1959	Mexico	
2023		Laura Pausini	b. 1974	Italy	
2024		Carlos Vives	b. 1961	Colombia	
2025		Raphael	b. 1943	Spain	
2026		Daddy Yankee	b. 1976	Puerto Rico	

^{^[I]} Each year is linked to an article about the Latin Grammy Awards ceremony of that year.

== See also ==
- Latin Grammy Lifetime Achievement Award
- Latin Grammy Trustees Award
- List of humanitarian and service awards
- List of Latin Grammy Awards categories
- Billboard Spirit of Hope Award
