= Latin Grammy Award for Best Tango Album =

- Awarded for: Tango albums containing at least 51% playing time of newly recorded material. For Solo artists, duos or groups.
- Country: United States
- Presented by: The Latin Recording Academy
- First award: 2000
- Currently held by: Tanghetto for En Vivo 20 Años (2025)
- Website: latingrammy.com

The Latin Grammy Award for Best Tango Album is an honor presented annually at the Latin Grammy Awards, a ceremony that recognizes excellence and creates a wider awareness of cultural diversity and contributions of Latin recording artists in the United States and internationally. It was first presented in 2000 at the 1st Annual Latin Grammy Awards.

The description of the category at the 2020 Latin Grammy Awards states that it is "for vocal or instrumental albums that contain at least 51% of total play time recorded with new material or material by traditional authors. Fusions with other musical genres will be eligible, provided that the Tango genre is substantially maintained in the judgement of the Ad Hoc committee."

Spanish singer Diego el Cigala and Argentine group Quinteto Astor Piazzolla are the only artist to receive the award more than once with two wins each. Argentine musicians Rodolfo Mederos and Leopoldo Federico hold the record of most nominations in the category with six each.

== Recipients ==
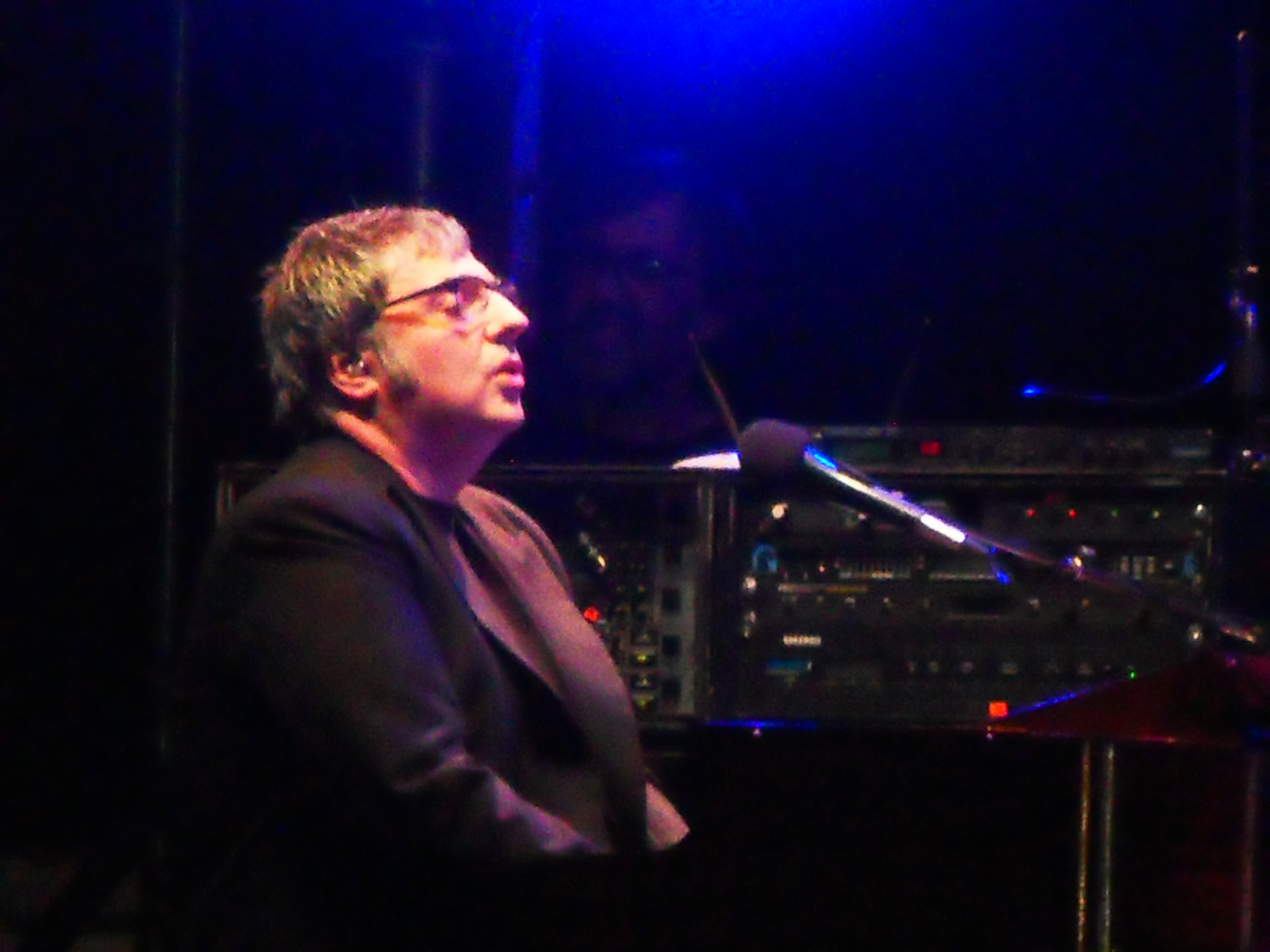

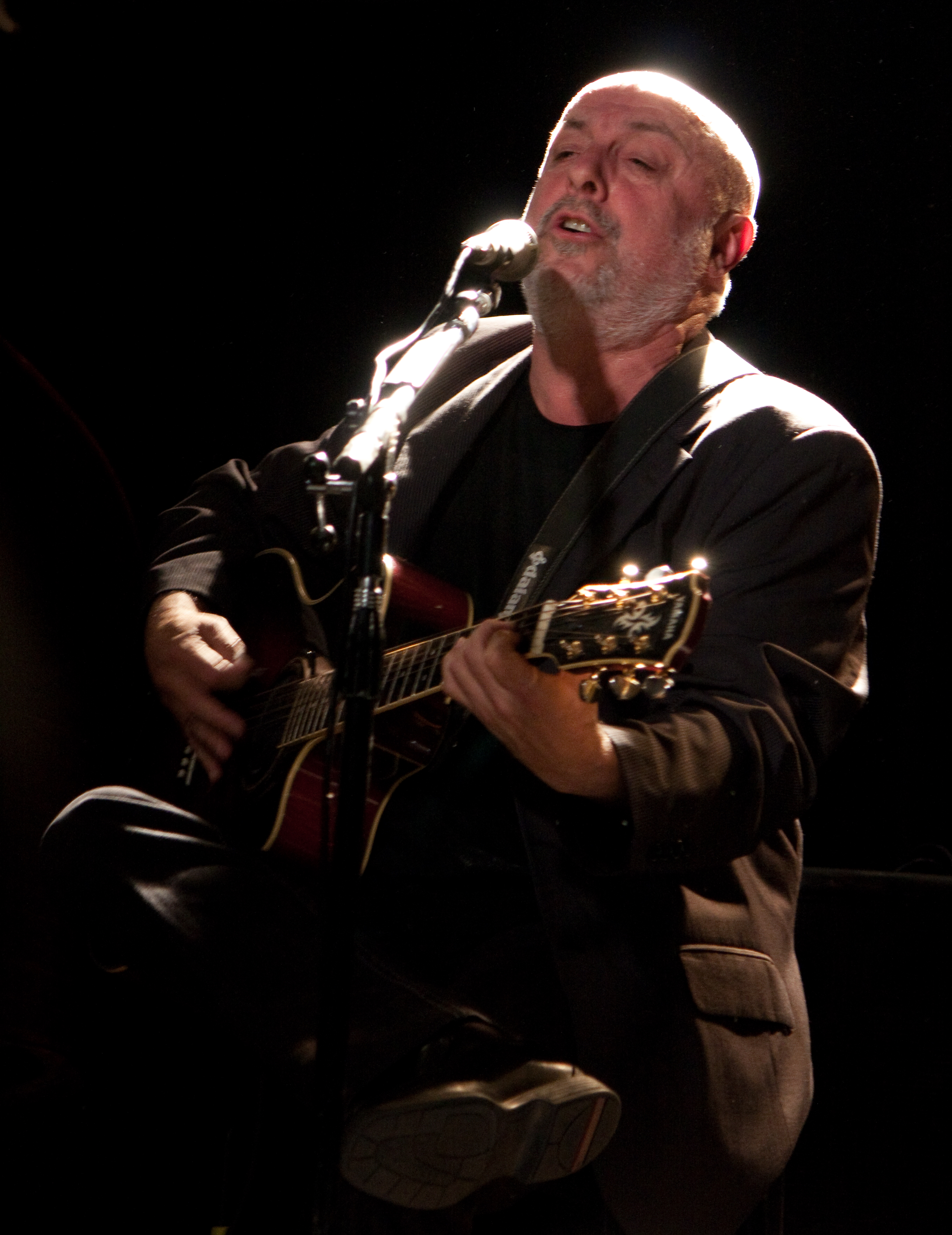
Argentine singers musicians Lito Vitale and Juan Carlos Baglietto were the first winners of this award in 2000 for Postales del Alma.

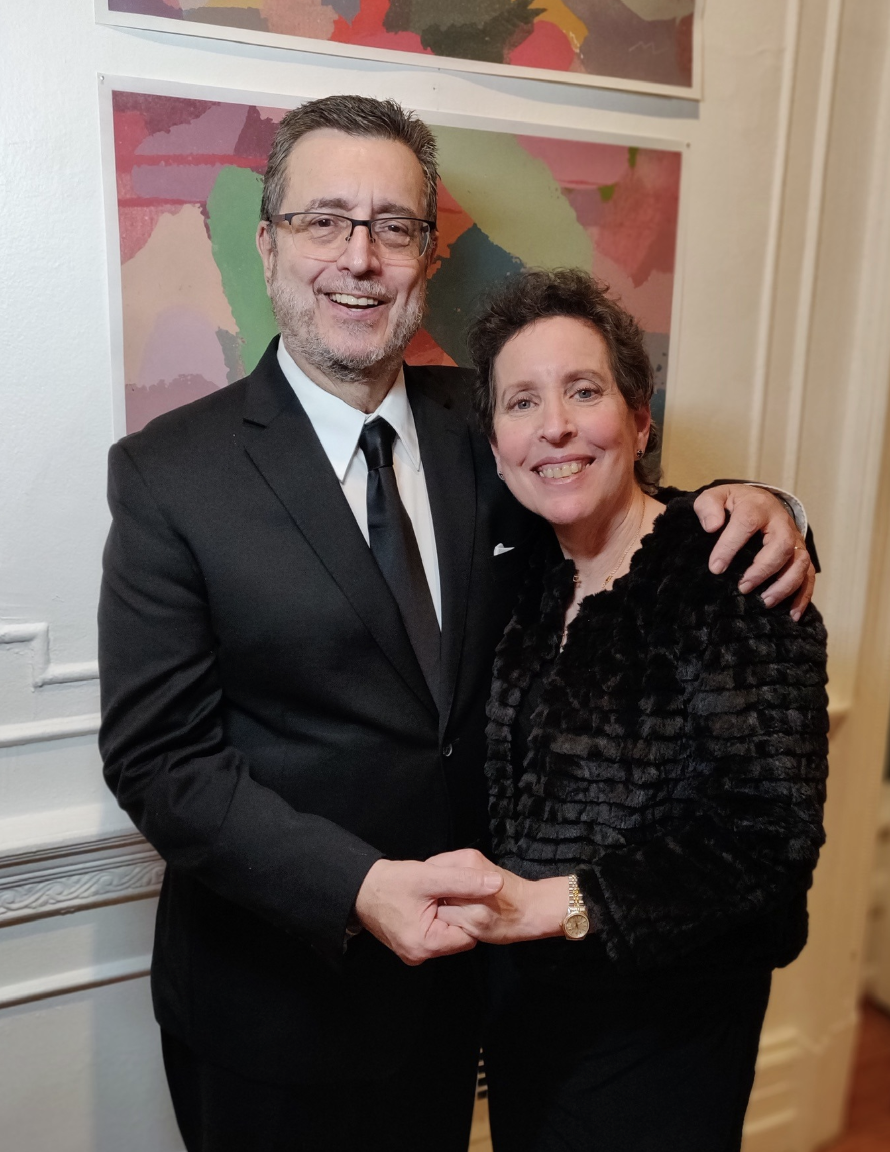
2001 winner Carlos Franzetti.

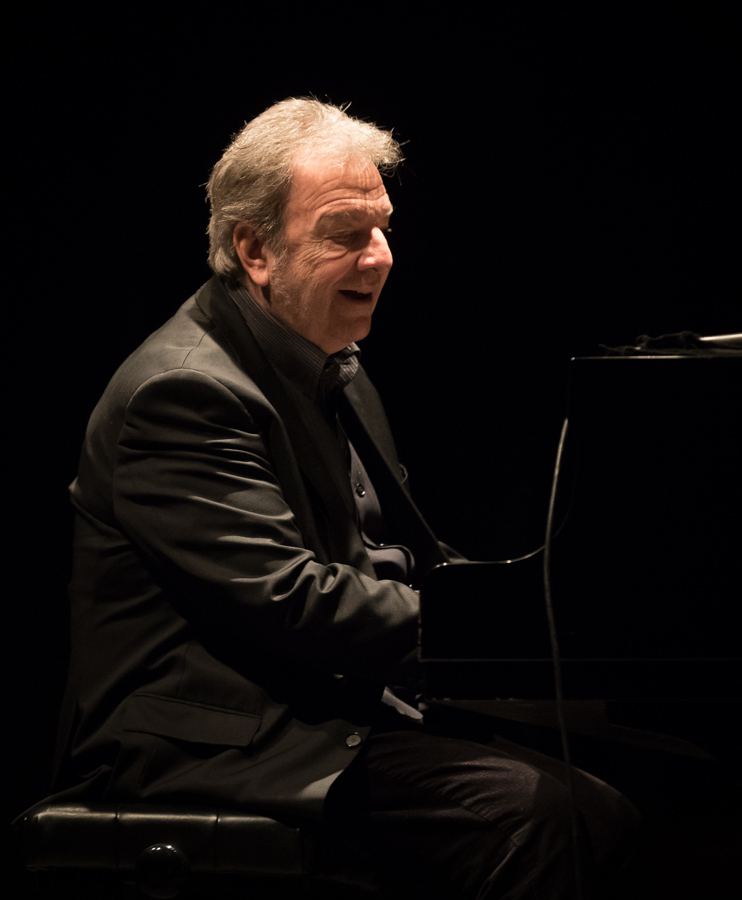
Pablo Ziegler won this award in 2005 alongside Quique Sinesi and Walter Castro for Bajo Cero.

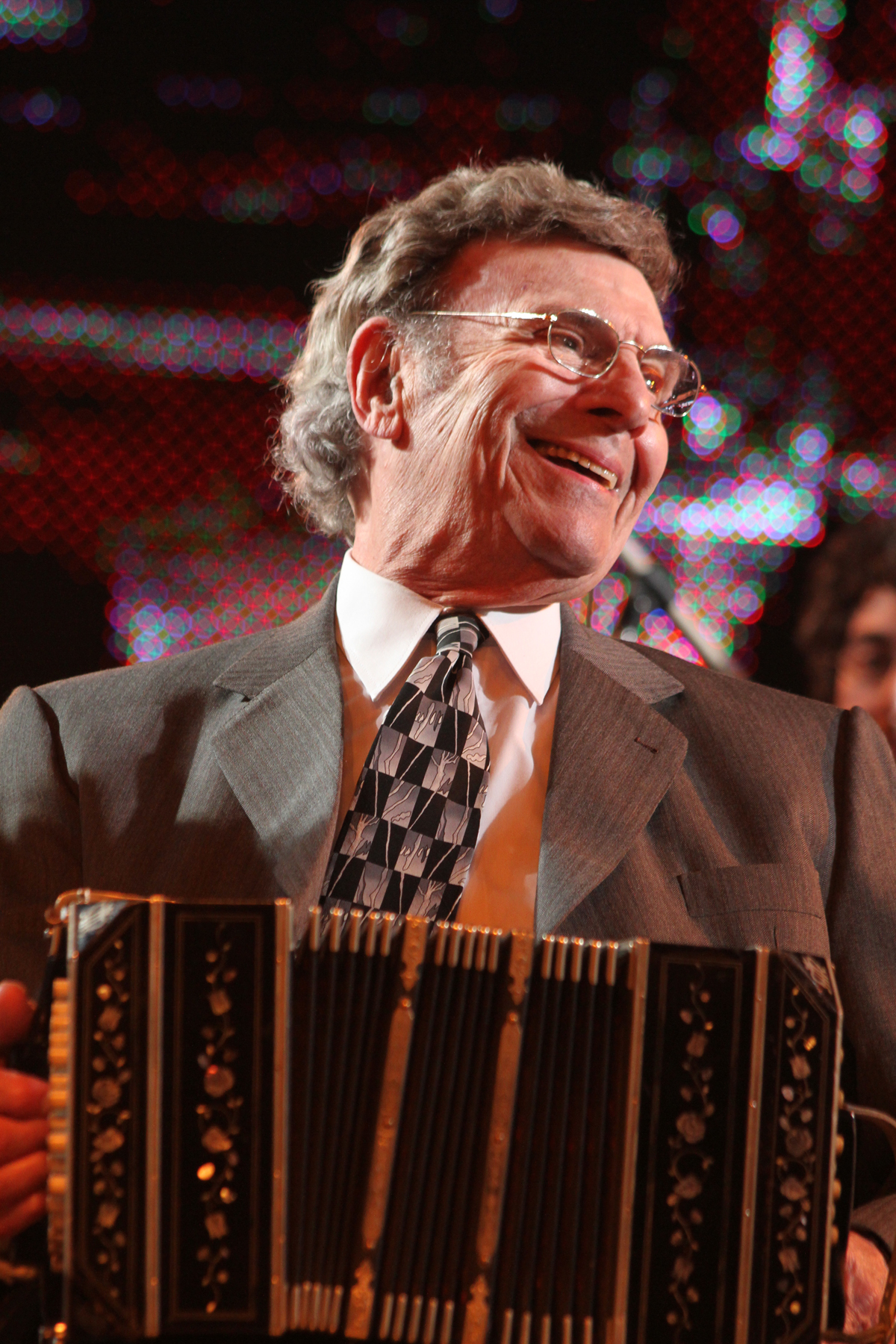
2009 winner Leopoldo Federico.

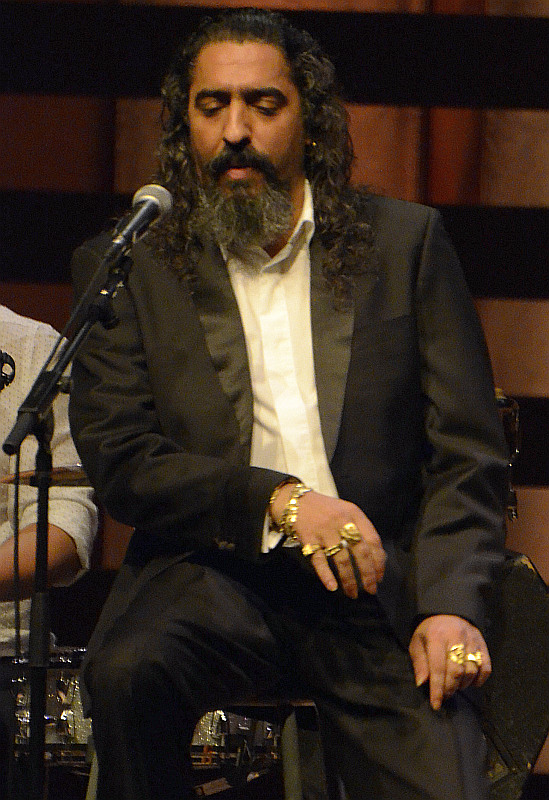
Diego el Cigala has won this award twice, in 2011 and 2013.

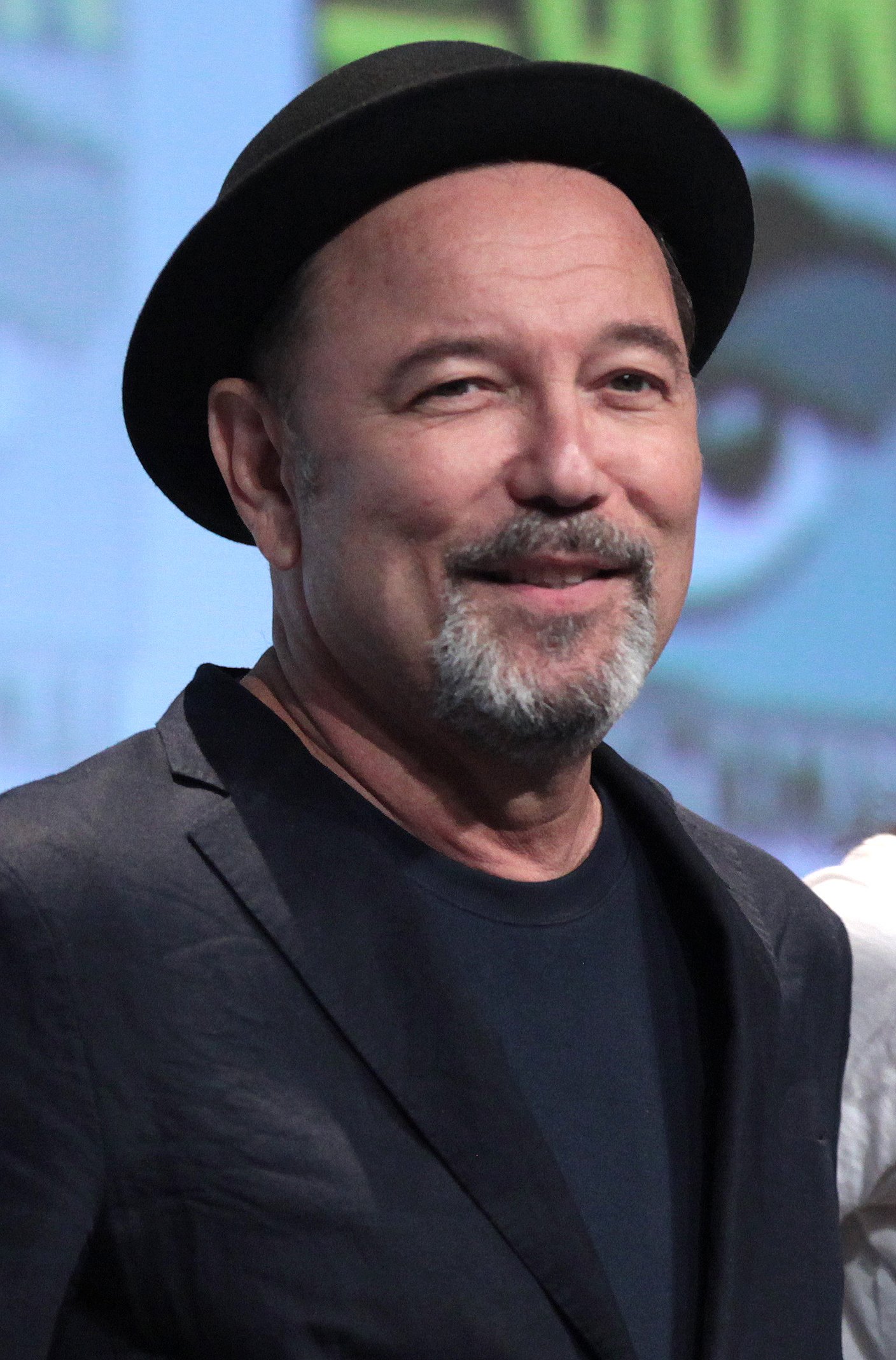
2014 winner Rubén Blades.

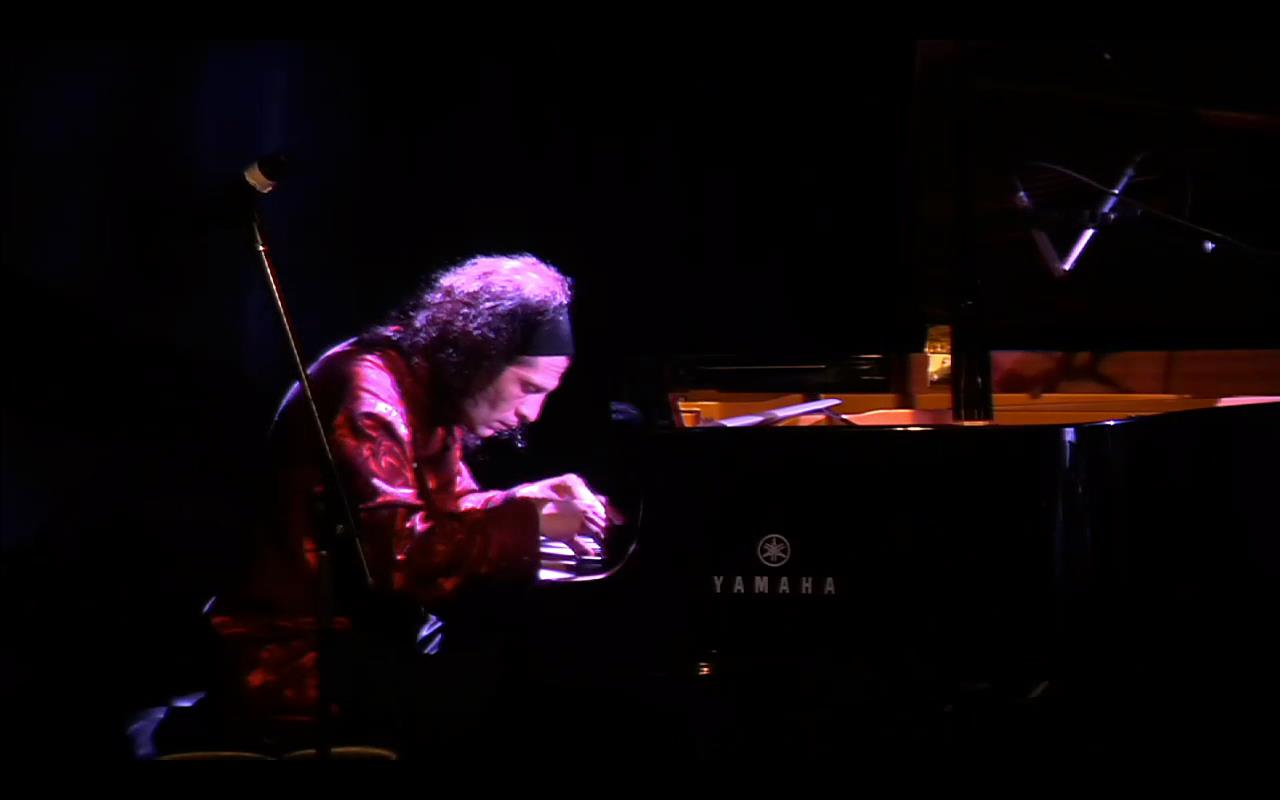
2017 winner Fernando Otero.

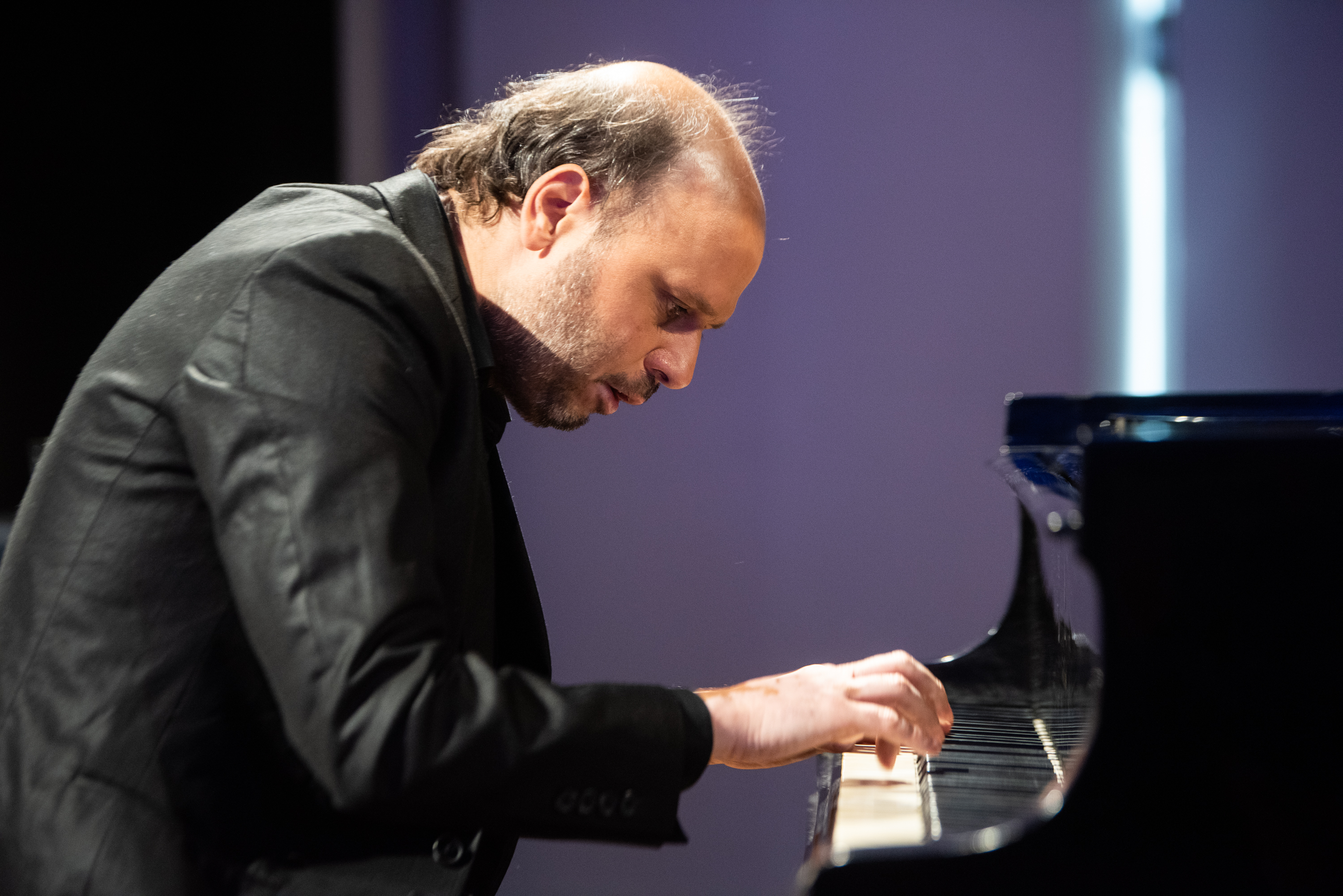
2020 winner Gustavo Casenave.

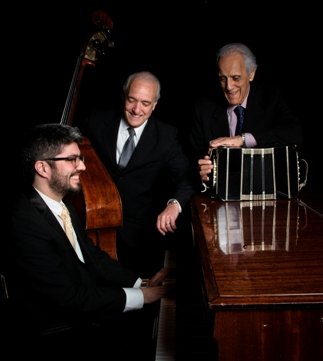
2022 winner Pablo Estigarribia (left) pictured alongside Víctor Lavallén and Horacio Cabarcos.

Year^{[I]}	Performing artist(s)	Work	Nominees	Ref.
2000	Lito Vitale and Juan Carlos Baglietto	Postales del Alma	Nestor Marconi – Trío Bien de arriba; Rodolfo Mederos – Eterno Buenos Aires; Nuevo Quinteto Real – Nuevo Quinteto Real; Quinteto Argentino de Cuerdas – Tangos de terciopelo	
2001	Carlos Franzetti	Tango Fatal	Leopoldo Federico & Orquesta – De Antología; Rodolfo Mederos and Nicolás Brizuela – Tangos; Nuevo Quinteto Real – Tangos; Salgan y de Lio – En Vivo en el Club del Vino	
2002	Sérgio & Odair Assad	Sérgio & Odair Assad Play Piazzolla	Adrián Iaies – Tango Reflections; Raul Jaurena – Tango Bar; Néstor Marconi – Sobre Imágenes; Julia Zenko – Tango Por Vos	
2003	Sexteto Mayor	Homenaje a Piazzolla	Adrián Iaies Trio – Las Cosas Tienen Movimiento; Adriana Nano y Los Bandoneones de Buenos Aires – Adriana Nano y Los Bandoneones de Buenos Aires; Orquesta del Tango de la Ciudad de Buenos Aires; Carlos Garcia, Raúl Garello and Julián Plaza (directors) – En Vivo en El Colón; Susana Rinaldi – La Rosa En Ginebra; Leo Sujatovich – Trío De Cámara Tangos	
2004	Gerardo Gandini	Postangos en Vivo en Rosario	Pablo Mainetti – Tres Rincones; María Estela Monti – Ciudadana; Orquesta El Arranque – En Vivo en el Auditorio de la Rete Due de Suiza; María Volonté and Horacio Larumbe – Fuimos	
2005	Pablo Ziegler, Quique Sinesi and Walter Castro	Bajo Cero	Hybrid Tango – Hybrid Tango; Nicolás Ledesma Cuarteto – De Tango Somos; Adriana Nano – Buenos Aires, Viaje / Buenos Aires, Journey; Trelles and Cirigliano – Solo Para Dos	
2006	Various Artists: Gustavo Santaolalla & Gustavo Mozzi, producers	Café de Los Maestros	Gerardo Gandini – Flores Negras Postangos en Vivo en Rosario Vol. II; María Estela Monti – Ciudad Secreta; Lalo Schifrin – Letters from Argentina	
2007	Raul Jaurena	Te Amo Tango	Luisa Maria Güell – Una; Rodolfo Mederos Orquesta Típica – Comunidad; Vayo – Tango Legends	
2008	Various Artists: Andrés Mayo, producer	Buenos Aires, Días y Noches de Tango	Esteban Morgado Cuarteto – Milongueros; Luis Salinas – Tango; Javier Vinasco and Edith Ruiz – Astos Piazzolla/Heitor Villa-Lobos; Pablo Ziegler, Quique Sinesi and Walter Castro – Buenos Aires Report	
2009	Leopoldo Federico	Mi Fueye Querido	Cacho Castaña – Yo Seré el Amor; Melingo – Maldito Tango; María Estela Monti – Solo Piazzolla; Narcotango – En Vivo; Various Artists; Jaime Wilensky (producer) – TangoNuevo 2.1 de Jaime Wilensky	
2010	Aida Cuevas	De Corazón a Corazón Mariachi Tango	Pablo Aslan – Tango Grill; Dyango – Puñaladas en el Alma; Leopoldo Federico and Hugo Rivas – Sentido Único; Narcotango – Limanueva; Vayo – Tango Universal	
2011	Diego El Cigala	Cigala & Tango	Leopoldo Federico and El Arranque – Raras Partituras 6; Orquesta del Tango de la Ciudad de Buenos Aires and Susana Rinaldi – En Vivo – Homenaje A Cátulo Castillo & Anibal Troilo; Orquesta del Tango de la Ciudad de Buenos Aires – 30 Años; Susana Rinaldi and Leopoldo Federico – Vos y Yo	
2012	Arturo Sandoval	Tango Como Yo Te Siento	Carlos Bosio – El Tango Lo Siento Así; Cuartetango String Quartet – Masters of Bandoneon; Susana Rinaldi – Experimentango; Tango VIP – Grandes Varones del Tango	
2013	Diego El Cigala	Romance de la Luna Tucumana	Julio Botti – Tango Nostalgias; Hernán Lucero – Tangos y Canciones Criollas; Ramírez-Satorre – Piazzolla de Cámara; Pablo Ziegler and Metropole Orkest – Amsterdam Meets New Tango	
2014	Rubén Blades	Tangos	Carlos Franzetti – In The Key Of Tango; Mónica Navarro – Calle; Tanghetto – Hybrid Tango II; Marianela Villalobos – Amor y Tango	
2015	Orquesta del Tango de Buenos Aires	Homenaje A Astor Piazzolla	Ariel Ardit – Aníbal Troilo 100 Años; Octavio Brunetti and Elmira Darvarova – Piazzolla: Desde Estudios A Tangos; Quinteto Leopoldo Federico – Bogotá - Buenos Aires; Berta Rojas and Camerata Bariloche – Historia del Tango - History Of Tango; Selección Nacional De Tango – Troilo 100 Años	
2016	Nicolás Ledesma y Su Orquesta	Cuando Llora la Milonga	Ariel Ardit and Filarmónica de Medellín – Gardel Sinfónico; Julio Botti, Pablo Ziegler and Saul Zaks conducting the University of Southern Denmark Symphony Orchestra – Sax to Tango; Omar Mollo – ... Tangamente; Leonardo Pastore – Carlos Gardel Original	
2017	Fernando Otero	Solo Buenos Aires	El Arranque – 20 Años - En Vivo En Café Vinilo; Patricia Malanca – Bucles; Rodolfo Mederos – 13; Tango Orchestra – Mixturas	
2018	Pedro Giraudo	Vigor Tanguero	Daniel Binelli and Nick Danielson – Nostalgias; Rodolfo Mederos Trio – Troilo Por Mederos, En Su Huella; Omar Mollo and Gran Orquesta Típica Otra – Tango Cosmopolita; Miguel Pereiro – Mística Ciudad	
2019	Quinteto Astor Piazzolla	Revolucionario	Daniel Binelli and Nick Danielson – Marrón y Azul; Enrique Campos – Roto; Bernardo Monk – Atípico; Pablo Ziegler Chamber Quartet – Radiotango	
2020	Gustavo Casenave Quartet	Fuelle y Cuerda	Alejandro Fasanini – Contemporary Tango Trilogy; Jorge Calandrelli – Tango Argentino: Gardel y Piazzella; Pablo Estigarribia, Victor Lavallen and Horacio Cabarcos – Comme Il Faut; Rodolfo Mederos – Tango Sacro	
2021	Tinto Tango	Tinto Tango Plays Piazzolla	Pan American Symphony Orchestra – Tango of the Americas; Federico Pereiro – 348; Quinteto Revolucionario – 100 Años; Tanghetto – Tanghetto Plays Piazzolla	
2022	Pablo Estigarribia	Horacio Salgán Piano Transcriptions	Los Tangueros del Oeste – Alma Vieja; Ricardo Montaner – Tango; Pablo Motta Ensamble featuring Franco Luciani – Milonguero; Mariana Quinteros – Tango de Nuevos Ayres; Spinettango – Spinettango	
2023	Quinteto Astor Piazzolla	Operation Tango	Pablo Jaurena – Retrato del Aire; Susana Rinaldi & Osvaldo Piro – Reencuentro; Romo - Agri - Messiez Tango Trio – Ahora; Tanghetto – Argentinxs	
2024	Diego Schissi Quinteto	Apiazolado	Guillermo Fernández featuring Cristian Zarate – El Cantor de Tangos; Franco Luciani & Fabrizio Mocata – Tangos Cruzados; Mariana Mazú – ¿Y el Fin del Amor?; Ulmann Cuarteto – Ya Está en el Aire	
2025	Tanghetto	En Vivo 20 Años	José Colángelo – Colángelo... Tango; Orquesta Típica Daniel Ruggiero – Piazzolla para Orquesta Típica; Giovanni Parra Quinteto – Milonguín; Richard Scofano & Alfredo Minetti – Shin-Urayasu; Sexteto Fantasma – La Inevitable Tentación de Ir a Contramano	

== See also ==
- Tango music
