= Latin Grammy Award for Best Romantic Music Album =

Discontinued Latin Grammy Award category (2004–2008)

- Awarded for: quality romantic music albums
- Country: United States
- Presented by: The Latin Recording Academy
- First award: 2004
- Final award: 2008

Highlights
- Most awards: Roberto Carlos (2)
- Most nominations: Leonardo (4)
- Website: latingrammy.com

The Latin Grammy Award for Best Romantic Music Album was an honor presented annually at the Latin Grammy Awards, a ceremony that recognizes excellence and creates a wider awareness of cultural diversity and contributions of Latin recording artists in the United States and internationally. The award was first presented to Brazilian duo Zezé Di Camargo & Luciano for their self-titled album during the 5th Latin Grammy Awards ceremony which took place at the Shrine Auditorium in Los Angeles, California. The category was discontinued in 2008, with César Menotti & Fabiano being the last recipients of the award for their album .com Você.

Brazilian singer Roberto Carlos holds the record for most wins in the category with two, in 2005 for Pra Sempre ao Vivo no Pacaembu and in 2006 for Roberto Carlos. Leonardo was the most nominated artist in the category with four nominations.

== Winners and nominees ==
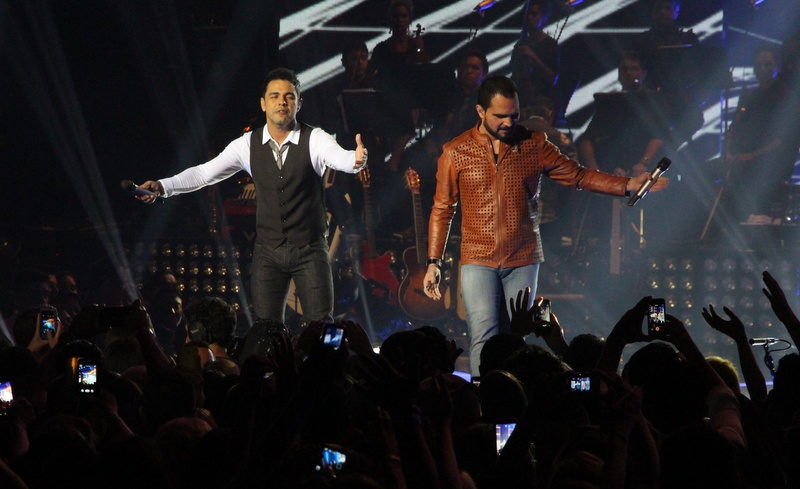
Zezé Di Camargo & Luciano were the first recipients of the award.

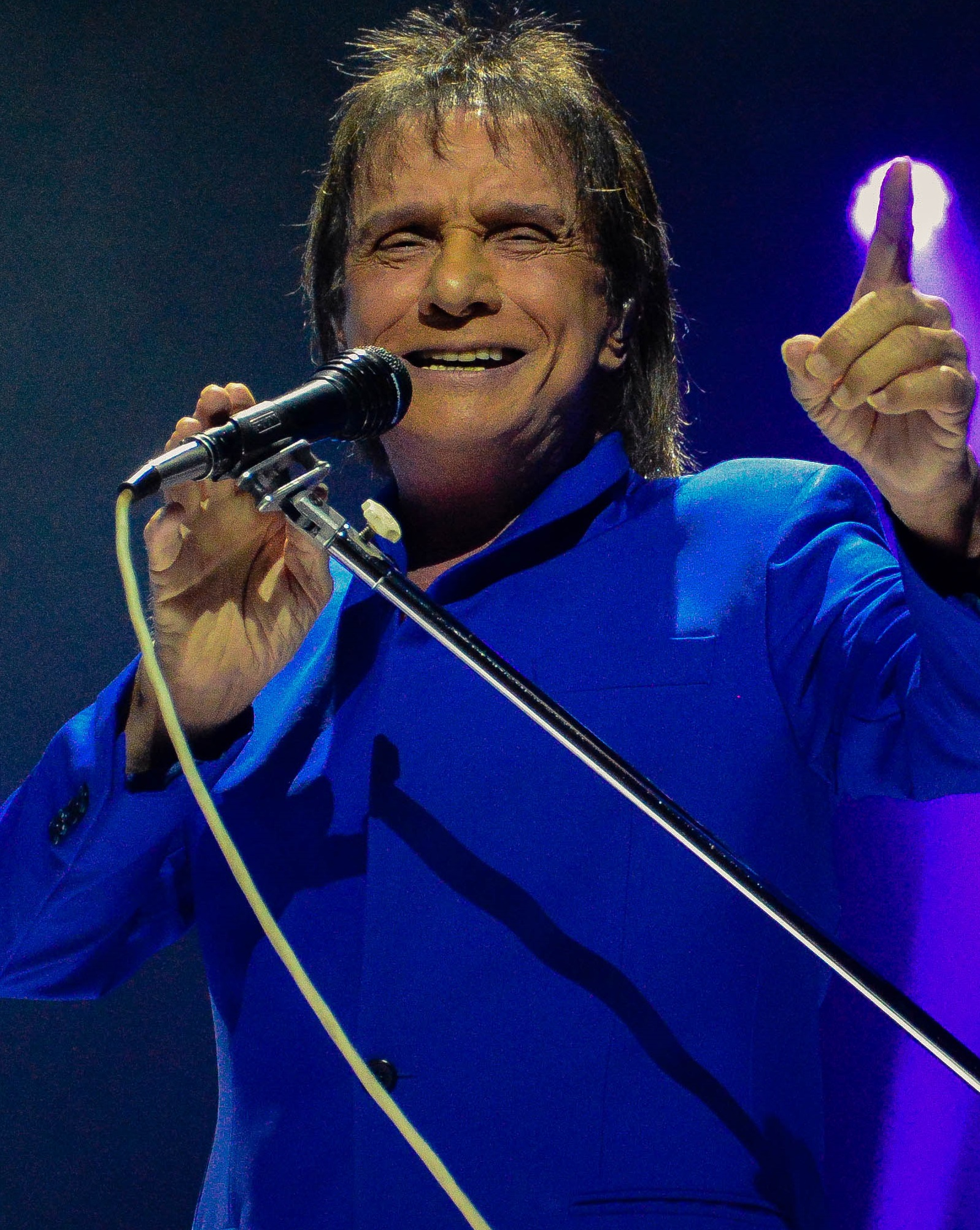
Two-time winner Roberto Carlos.

Year^{[I]}	Performing artist(s)	Work	Nominees^{[II]}	Ref.
2004	Zezé di Camargo & Luciano	Zezé di Camargo y Luciano	Ataíde & Alexandre — Momento Especial; Bruno & Marrone — Inevitável; Juliano Cezar — O Cowboy Vagabundo-Vida de Peão; Leonardo — Brincadeira Tem Hora; Marciano — Ao Vivo-Meu Ofício é Cantar	
2005	Roberto Carlos	Pra Sempre ao Vivo no Pacaembu	Raimundo Fagner — Donos do Brasil; Leonardo — Leonardo Canta Grandes Sucessos; Roberta Miranda — Alma Sertaneja; Alexandre Pires — Alto Falante	
2006	Roberto Carlos	Roberto Carlos	Alaíde Costa — Tudo Que o Tempo Me Deixou; Daniel — Amor Absoluto; Leonardo — De Corpo e Alma; Tânia Mara — Louca Paixão	
2007	Cauby Peixoto	Eternamente Cauby Peixoto: 55 Anos de Carreira	Bruno & Marrone — Ao Vivo em Goiânia; Wanderley Cardoso — 40 Años de Sucesso do Bom Rapaz: Ao Vivo; Zezé Di Camargo & Luciano — Diferente; Fábio Jr. — Minhas Canções	
2008	César Menotti & Fabiano	.com Você	Bruno & Marrone — Acústico II - Volume 1; Daniel — Difícil Não Falar de Amor; Leonardo — Coração Bandido; Roberta Miranda — Senhora Raiz	
