= Franco Luciani =

Argentine composer

- Born: November 27, 1981 (age 44); Rosario, Santa Fe Argentina
- Instrument: Harmonica
- Website: www.francoluciani.com.ar

Franco Luciani (born November 27, 1981) is an Argentine musician and composer who plays harmonica.

== Biography ==
Franco Luciani studied symphonic percussion and drums at the Municipal School of Music, the National University of Rosario, and at the Provincial School of Music, all in Rosario, his native city.

However, as a professional musician he plays the chromatic harmonica. His musical style combines Argentine folklore music with tango. He also dedicated time to study jazz and classical music.

In 2002 he participated in the preliminary competition of the National Festival of Folklore in Cosquín and obtained the Cosquín Revelation Award, as well as the Main Award in the category Instrumental Soloist. Also Franco Luciani obtained other awards, such as Premio Clarín Espectáculos in 2005, Trimarg in 2007 by UNESCO, Premio Atahualpa in 2008, Premio Clarín Espectáculos in 2009 in the category «Figura del Folclore» (jointly with Mercedes Sosa and Teresa Parodi), Premio «Consagración» in 2010 at Golden Edition of the Festival de Cosquín, and Premio Atahualpa as the Best Instrumental Soloist in 2010 and 2011.

He has had numerous tours over América, Europe and Asia and shared the stage with Mercedes Sosa, Fito Páez, Víctor Heredia, Juan Carlos Baglietto, Jairo, Gotan Project, Raúl Carnota, Pedro Aznar, Jaime Torres, Divididos, Guillermo Fernández, León Gieco, Luis Salinas, Sandra Luna Teresa Parodi, Federico Pecchia, María Volonté, Horacio Molina, Dúo Coplanacu, Eva Ayllón, Lila Downs, among others.

Both in his discography and his live performances he played with different musical formations like duet (with the pianist Daniel Godfrid), trio (Proyecto Sanluca, that included Raúl Carnota and Rodolfo Sánchez, and Tango Trío, together with Daniel Godfrid and Ariel Argañaraz), group (accompanied by Facundo Peralta, Martín González and Horacio Cacoliris) and quartet (the group of the jazz pianist Federico Lechner).

In 2015 Franco Luciani got Premio Konex - Merit Diploma as one of the five best instrumentalists of the last decade in Argentina.

== Discography ==
- Armusa (Franco Luciani Grupo, Tango y Folklore instrumental, 2002, re-edition Acqua Records, 2010)
- Armónica y Tango (Franco Luciani Dúo, Tango instrumental, Acqua Records, 2006)
- Acuarelas de Bolsillo (Franco Luciani Grupo, Tango y Folklore instrumental, Acqua Records, 2007)
- Proyecto Sanluca (Proyecto Sanluca, Folklore y Tango, Acqua Records, 2009)
- Falsos Límites (Franco Luciani y Federico Lechner, Acqua Records, 2010)
- Franco Luciani Tango (Franco Luciani Tango Trío, Acqua Records, 2012)
- Franco Luciani Folklore (Franco Luciani Grupo, Acqua Records, 2012)
- Anda en el Aire (Franco Luciani Trío, Acqua Records, 2018)
