= Operation Tango =

2023 album by Quinteto Astor Piazzolla

Studio album by Quinteto Astor Piazzolla
- Released: March 17, 2023
- Genre: Tango
- Length: 52:43
- Label: E54Music

Operation Tango is a tango album by the Argentine band Quinteto Astor Piazzolla, released by the E54Music label on March 17, 2023. With this album, the group won the 2023 Latin Grammy for Best Tango Album.

== Background ==
Founded to honor and promote the work of Astor Piazzolla, the Argentine musical group Quinteto Astor Piazzolla has been dedicated to this musical mission since 1998. Regarding the project Operation Tango, in an interview with journalist Augusto Pio for the Brazilian newspaper Estado de Minas, saxophonist and flutist Julián Vat stated that “the idea is not just to focus on Piazzolla’s classics. Part of our mission is to focus on lesser-known pieces that we believe deserve to be heard."

The album includes songs such as “Tocata Rea” and “Fuga y Misterio” from the tango opera (“operita”) María de Buenos Aires. It also features the song “Los Sueños,” which appears on the soundtrack of the film Sur, directed by Fernando Solanas.

== Tracks ==
No.	Title	Writer(s)	Length
1.	"Thriller"	Astor Piazzolla	2:58
2.	"Los Sueños"	Astor Piazzolla	5:20
3.	"Fuga y Misterio"	Astor Piazzolla	4:13
4.	"Operation Tango"	Astor Piazzolla	6:22
5.	"Zigue Zague"	Astor Piazzolla	4:34
6.	"Tocata Rea"	Astor Piazzolla	6:10
7.	"Tango del Ángel"	Astor Piazzolla	4:15
8.	"Tango Ballet"	Astor Piazzolla	11:05
9.	"Celos"	Astor Piazzolla	3:33
10.	"Melancólico Buenos Aires"	Astor Piazzolla	4:08
Total length:			52:43

== Release ==
The album was released on March 17, 2023, via E54Music, and became available digitally on music distribution platforms.

=== Tour ===
To promote the album, the band performed in several cities, including Salvador, Curitiba, and Belo Horizonte in Brazil; Lisbon, Guarda, and Porto in Portugal; Mexico City, the capital of Mexico; Montevideo, the capital of Uruguay; and West Palm Beach in the United States.

== Prizes ==
The album was nominated for a 2023 Latin Grammy in the Best Tango Album category. At a ceremony held in Seville, Andalusia, Spain, the album won the award.

Year	Prize	Category	Venue	Result	Ref.
2023	Grammy Latino	Best Tango Album	FIBES Conference and Exhibition Centre, Seville, Andalusia, Spain	Won	

== Personnel ==
The following musicians contributed to the album:

- Pablo Mainetti: bandoneon;
- Serdar Geldymuradov: violin;
- Armando de la Vega: guitar;
- Nicolás Guerschberg: piano;
- Daniel Falasca: double bass.
