= Prometo =

Studio album by Pablo Alborán
- Released: 17 November 2017
- Length: 52:09
- Language: Spanish
- Label: Warner Music Spain
- Producer: Julio Reyes Copello

Pablo Alborán chronology
Tour Terral (Tres Noches en Las Ventas) (2015)	Prometo (2017)	Vértigo (2020)

Singles from Prometo
- 1. "Saturno" Released: September 8, 2017; 2. "No Vaya a Ser" Released: September 8, 2017; 3. "Prometo" Released: January 19, 2018; 4. "La Llave" Released: May 31, 2018; 5. "Tu Refugio" Released: October 26, 2018

Prometo (transl. I Promise) is the fourth studio album by Spanish singer-songwriter Pablo Alborán. It was announced on 9 October 2017 and released on 17 November 2017 through Warner Music Spain.

== Background ==
In an interview with Billboard, Alborán explained the title as "...a promise to myself, to be honest to my emotions -- and at the same time, a promise to my fans. I promise to make music until death. On the other hand, I think that when you promise, you build up courage and maturity. We feel secure to fulfill that promise."

== Reception ==
Amazon said "Alborán doesn't steer too far away with his unique voice and music styles from previous albums, however he does take some tracks to more up-beat tempos than we've heard from him in the past. The first two singles were released just a few weeks ago... [and] both have become some of the most played, viewed Latin pop songs in recent months and they have definitely set the stage for a strong album release." Nacho from Vibes of Silence gave the album 6.5 out of 10 saying there is "too much alternation between the ballads and more relaxed rhythms and the electronic and ethnic tints that some of the tracks have" but added "Pablo always deliver[s]. He has a privileged voice, with an incredible facility to transmit emotions and a remarkable talent to compose."

Prometo received nominations for a Grammy Award for Best Latin Pop Album and for the Album of the Year and Best Traditional Pop Vocal Album at the 19th Annual Latin Grammy Awards.

== Singles ==
- "Saturno" and "No Vaya a Ser" were released as the album's lead singles on 8 September 2017.
- "Prometo" was released on 19 January 2018 as the album's third official single.

=== Promotional singles ===
- A "piano and string version" of "Prometo", "La llave" and "Al Paraíso" were released in October 2017 as promotional singles and pre-order tracks from the album.

== Track listing ==
All tracks are written by Pablo Alborán.

No.	Title	Length
1.	"Saturno"	4:13
2.	"Prometo"	5:06
3.	"No Vaya a Ser"	3:17
4.	"Cuerda al Corazón"	3:36
5.	"Lo Nuestro"	4:08
6.	"Vivir"	3:47
7.	"Tu Refugio"	4:19
8.	"La Llave"	3:16
9.	"Idiota"	3:25
10.	"Boca De Hule"	4:12
11.	"Curo Tus Labios"	4:14
12.	"Al Paraíso"	3:06
13.	"Prometo" (Versión piano y cuerda)	5:30

Deluxe bonus tracks
No.	Title	Length
14.	"La Llave" (Versión pop)	3:16
15.	"Boca De Hule" (with Alejandro Sanz)	4:12
16.	"Al Paraíso" (with Carminho)	3:06

DVD1: Edicion Especial – Live concert filmed in Sevilla, Spain during his Prometo Tour.
No.	Title	Length
1.	"Obertura / No vaya a ser (En Directo, Estadio La Cartuja, Sevilla, 16 de Junio de 2018)"	3:38
2.	"Pasos de cero (En Directo, Estadio La Cartuja, Sevilla, 16 de Junio de 2018)"	3:55
3.	"La escalera (En Directo, Estadio La Cartuja, Sevilla, 16 de Junio de 2018)"	4:37
4.	"Dónde está el Amor (En Directo, Estadio La Cartuja, Sevilla, 16 de Junio de 2018)"	4:04
5.	"Recuérdame (En Directo, Estadio La Cartuja, Sevilla, 16 de Junio de 2018)"	3:04
6.	"Quién (En Directo, Estadio La Cartuja, Sevilla, 16 de Junio de 2018)"	4:15
7.	"Cuerda al corazón (En Directo, Estadio La Cartuja, Sevilla, 16 de Junio de 2018)"	3:42
8.	"Lo nuestro (En Directo, Estadio La Cartuja, Sevilla, 16 de Junio de 2018)"	4:11
9.	"Quimera (En Directo, Estadio La Cartuja, Sevilla, 16 de Junio de 2018)"	4:30
10.	"Tanto (En Directo, Estadio La Cartuja, Sevilla, 16 de Junio de 2018)"	4:47
11.	"Medley: La mudanza / Perdóname / Te He Echado de Menos (En Directo, Estadio La Cartuja, Sevilla, 16 de Junio de 2018)"	9:39
12.	"Al paraíso (En Directo, Estadio La Cartuja, Sevilla, 16 de Junio de 2018)"	3:22
13.	"Saturno (En Directo, Estadio La Cartuja, Sevilla, 16 de Junio de 2018)"	5:12
14.	"La llave (En Directo, Estadio La Cartuja, Sevilla, 16 de Junio de 2018)"	3:21
15.	"Boca de hule (En Directo, Estadio La Cartuja, Sevilla, 16 de Junio de 2018)"	4:49
16.	"Por fin (En Directo, Estadio La Cartuja, Sevilla, 16 de Junio de 2018)"	4:08
17.	"Tu refugio (En Directo, Estadio La Cartuja, Sevilla, 16 de Junio de 2018)"	4:05
18.	"Curo tus labios (En Directo, Estadio La Cartuja, Sevilla, 16 de Junio de 2018)"	3:44
19.	"Miedo (En Directo, Estadio La Cartuja, Sevilla, 16 de Junio de 2018)"	3:07
20.	"Idiota (En Directo, Estadio La Cartuja, Sevilla, 16 de Junio de 2018)"	3:27
21.	"Vivir (En Directo, Estadio La Cartuja, Sevilla, 16 de Junio de 2018)"	5:00
22.	"Solamente tú (En Directo, Estadio La Cartuja, Sevilla, 16 de Junio de 2018)"	5:02
23.	"Prometo (En Directo, Estadio La Cartuja, Sevilla, 16 de Junio de 2018)"	4:49
24.	"Éxtasis (En Directo, Estadio La Cartuja, Sevilla, 16 de Junio de 2018)"	4:13
25.	"Vívela (En Directo, Estadio La Cartuja, Sevilla, 16 de Junio de 2018)"	4:20

DVD2: Edicion Especial – Acoustic sessions + documentary + music videos.
No.	Title	Length
1.	"No vaya a ser (Acústico)"	2:52
2.	"Lo nuestro (Acústico)"	5:05
3.	"La llave (Acústico)"	3:20
4.	"Boca de hule (Acústico)"	3:41
5.	"Tu refugio (Acústico)"	5:09
6.	"Curo tus labios (Acústico) [En vivo, Prometo Estudios, 2018]"	4:15
7.	"Prometo Tour: Tras el telón (Documental)"
8.	"No vaya a ser"	3:17
9.	"Saturno"	4:13
10.	"Prometo (Versión piano y cuerda)"	5:32
11.	"La llave (feat. Piso 21)"	3:04
12.	"Tu refugio"	4:19

== Charts ==
=== Weekly charts ===
Weekly chart performance for Prometo
Chart (2017–18)	Peak position
Portuguese Albums (AFP)	2
Spanish Albums (PROMUSICAE)	1
Swiss Albums (Schweizer Hitparade)	89
US Top Latin Albums (Billboard)	11
US Latin Pop Albums (Billboard)	3

=== Year-end charts ===
2017 year-end chart performance for Prometo
Chart (2017)	Position
Spanish Albums (PROMUSICAE)	1

2018 year-end chart performance for Prometo
Chart (2018)	Position
Spanish Albums (PROMUSICAE)	1

2019 year-end chart performance for Prometo
Chart (2019)	Position
Spanish Albums (PROMUSICAE)	10

== Certifications ==
Certifications for Prometo
Region	Certification	Certified units/sales
Chile (IFPI Chile)	Gold	
Mexico (AMPROFON)	Gold	30,000^{‡}
Spain (PROMUSICAE)	6× Platinum	240,000^{‡}
United States (RIAA)	Gold (Latin)	30,000^{‡}
^{‡} Sales+streaming figures based on certification alone.

== Release history ==
Release history for Prometo
Region	Date	Format	Label	Catalogue
Various	17 November 2017	CD; digital download; streaming; vinyl	Warner Music Spain	9029575428
