= Tour Terral (Tres Noches en Las Ventas) =

Live album by Pablo Alborán
- Released: 6 November 2015
- Recorded: June 2015; Las Ventas, Madrid, Spain
- Genre: Latin pop
- Language: Spanish
- Label: Parlophone, Warner Music
- Producer: Pablo Alborán and Roberto Rodríguez

Pablo Alborán chronology
Terral (2014)	Tour Terral (Tres Noches en Las Ventas) (2015)	Prometo (2017)

Singles from Terral
- 1. "Vívela" Released: 5 October 2015

Tour Terral (Tres Noches en Las Ventas) is the second live album by Spanish singer-songwriter Pablo Alborán.

At the 17th Annual Latin Grammy Awards, the album received two nominations; Album of the Year and Best Contemporary Pop Vocal Album.

== Track listing ==
Disc 1

1. "Está Permitido"
2. "La Escalera"
3. "Pasos de cero"
4. "Ecos"
5. "Recuérdame"
6. "Quimera"
7. "Un Buen Amor"
8. "Desencuentro"
9. "Cuando Te Alejas" (with Jorge Drexler)
10. "El Olvido"
11. "Miedo"
12. "El Beso"
13. "Perdóname" (with Carminho)
14. "Te He Echado de Menos"
15. "Ahogándome Tu Adiós"

Disc two

1. "Caramelo"
2. "Quién" (with Alejandro Sanz)
3. "Gracias"
4. "Dónde está el Amor"
5. "Tanto"
6. "Extasis"
7. "Volver a Empezar"
8. "Solamente Tú"
9. "En Casa Del Herrero"
10. "Por Fin"
11. "Despidete"
12. "Vívela"

=== DVD ===
1. "Está Permitido"
2. "La Escalera"
3. "Pasos De Cero"
4. "Ecos"
5. "Recuérdame"
6. "Quimera
7. "Un Buen Amor"
8. "Desencuentro"
9. "Cuando Te Alejas" (with Jorge Drexler)
10. "El Olvido"
11. "Miedo"
12. "El Beso"
13. "Perdóname" (with Carminho)
14. "Te He Echado De Menos"
15. "Ahogándome Tu Adiós"
16. "Caramelo"
17. "Quién" (with Alejandro Sanz)
18. "Gracias"
19. "Dónde Está El Amor"
20. "Tanto"
21. "Éxtasis"
22. "Volver a Empezar"
23. "Solamente Tú"
24. "En Casa Del Herrero"
25. "Por Fin" (with Bebe)
26. "Despidete"
27. "Vivela"
28. "El Viaje Del Viento" (documentary)

== Charts ==
=== Weekly charts ===
Chart performance for Tour Terral
Chart (2015–16)	Peak position
Portuguese Albums (AFP)	6
Spanish Music DVD (Promusicae)	1

=== Year-end charts ===
Year-end chart performance for Tour Terral
Chart (2015)	Position
Spanish Music DVD (PROMUSICAE)	1

Chart (2016)	Position
Spanish Music DVD (PROMUSICAE)	1

Chart (2017)	Position
Spanish Music DVD (PROMUSICAE)	4

== Certifications ==
Certifications for Tour Terral
Region	Certification	Certified units/sales
Spain (Promusicae)	Platinum	25,000^{‡}
^{‡} Sales+streaming figures based on certification alone.
