= Latin Grammy Award for Best Contemporary Pop Album =

- Awarded for: recordings of the pop genre
- Country: United States
- Presented by: The Latin Recording Academy
- First award: 2000
- Currently held by: Alejandro Sanz for ¿Y Ahora Qué?+ (2026)
- Website: latingrammy.com

The Latin Grammy Award for Best Contemporary Pop Album is an honor presented at the Latin Grammy Awards, an annual ceremony established in 2000 to recognize excellence and promote broader awareness of the cultural diversity and contributions of Latin music recording artists in the United States and worldwide. The award is presented to performers and producers of albums that contain at least 51 percent newly recorded material within the pop genre.

The award was first presented in 2000, at the inaugural Latin Grammy Awards, as Best Pop Vocal Album, with Luis Miguel receiving the honor for Amarte es un placer. The category was discontinued after the 2001 ceremony and replaced by gender-specific awards: Best Female Pop Vocal Album and Best Male Pop Vocal Album, which remained in use until 2011. In 2012, those categories were retired and the award was reinstated as Best Contemporary Pop Vocal Album, a title it retained through the 2019 ceremony. In 2020, the category was renamed Best Pop Vocal Album again. For the 2025 ceremony, the Latin Recording Academy announced that the award would be renamed Best Contemporary Pop Album again.

== Winners and nominees ==
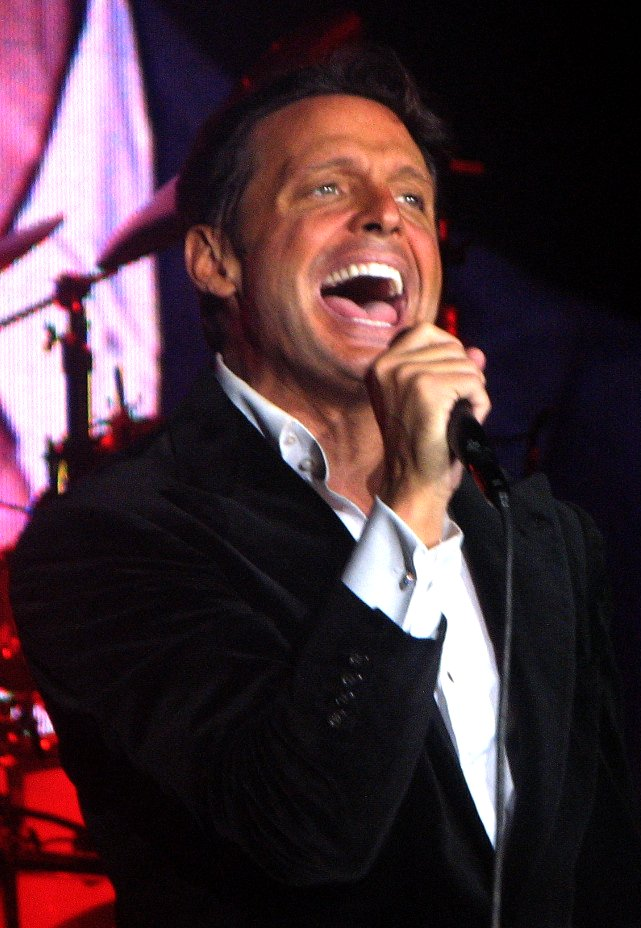
Luis Miguel's Amarte es un Placer, the 2000 inaugural winner, also won Album of the Year.

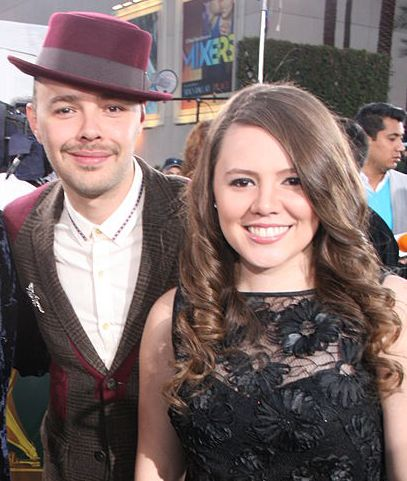
Two-time winners Jesse & Joy won in 2012 and 2016.

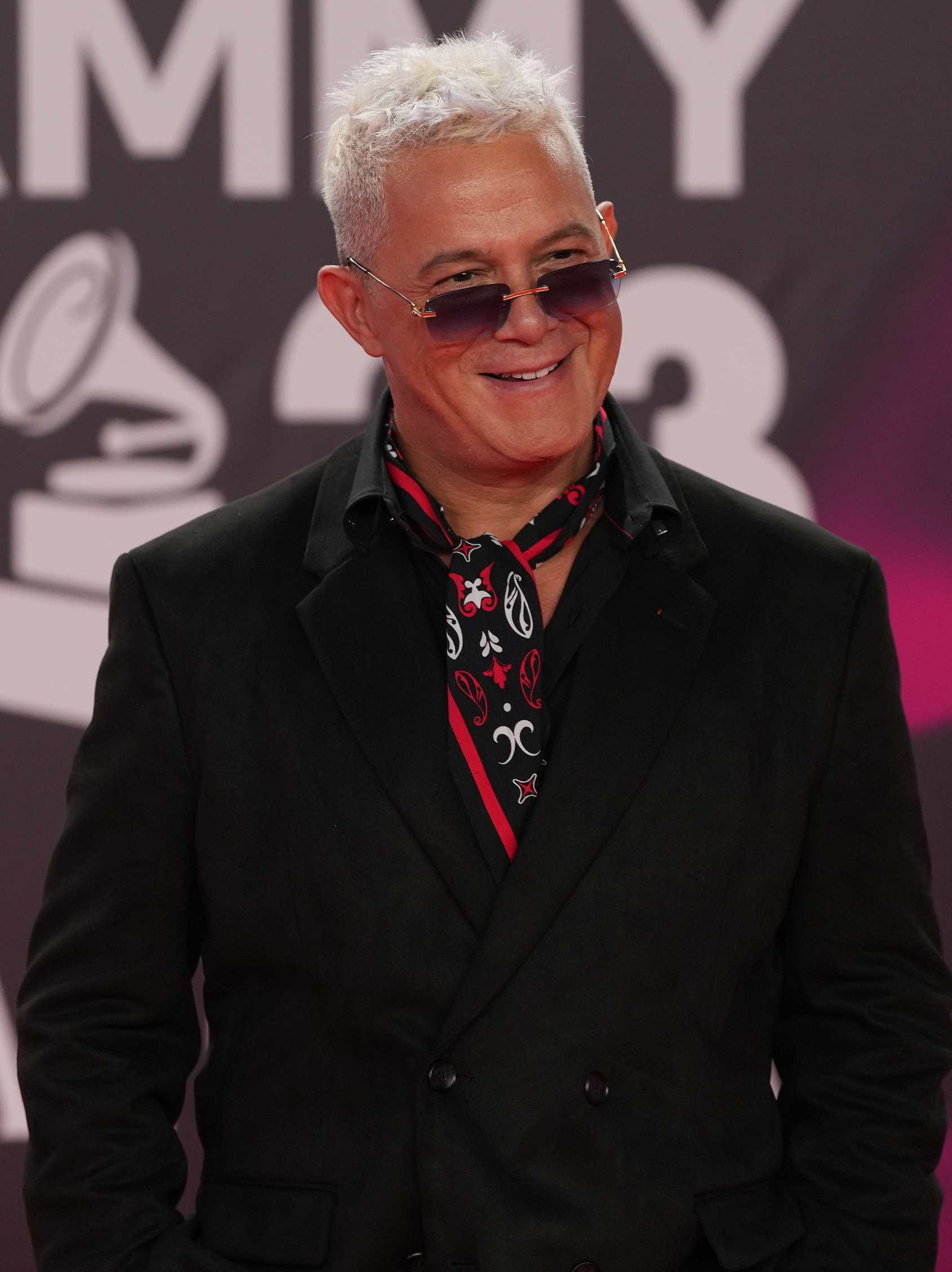
Alejandro Sanz has won this award three times: in 2013, 2015 and 2025.

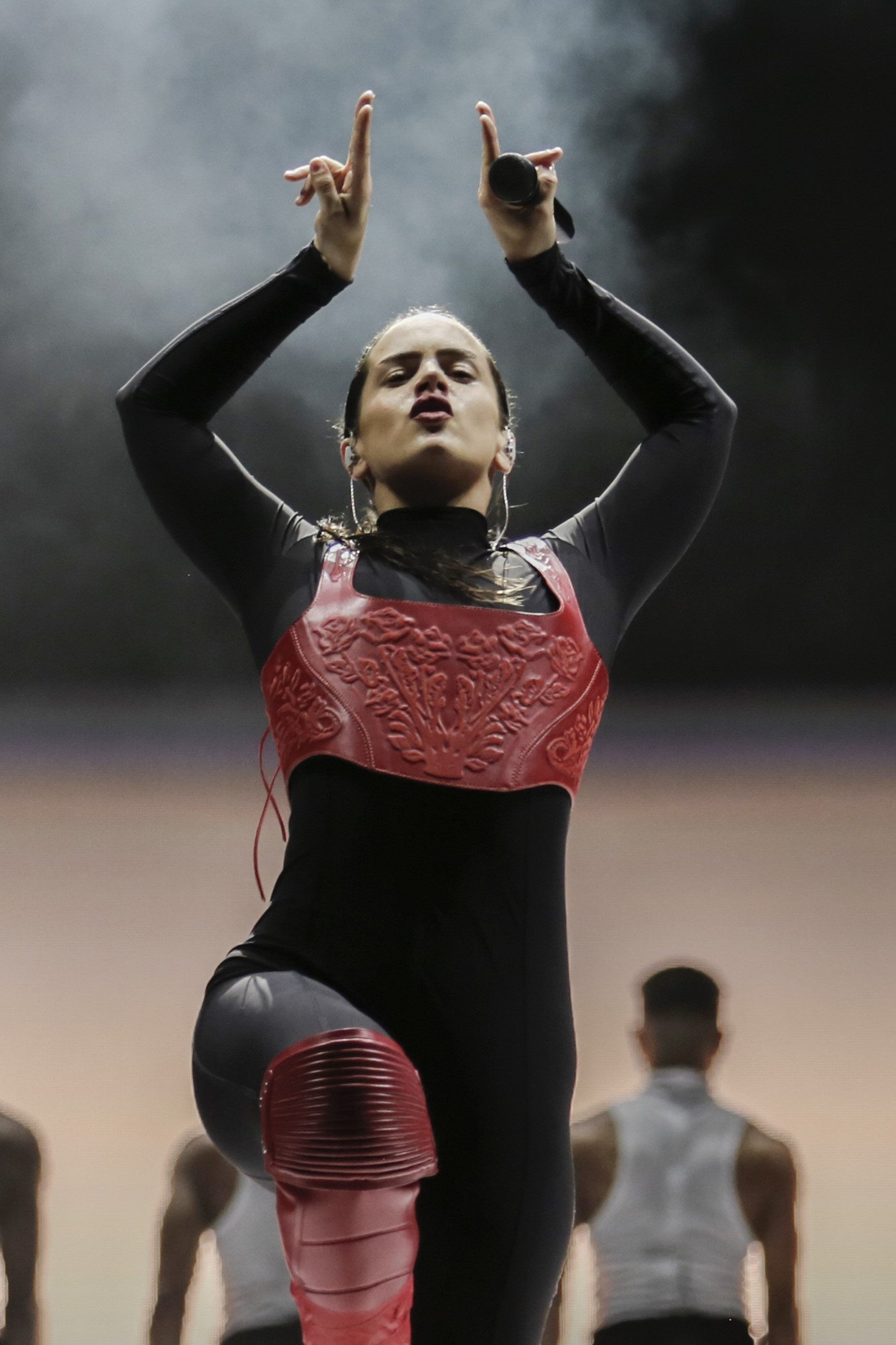
Rosalía's El Mal Querer, won this award and Album of the Year in 2019.

Year	Performing artist(s)	Work	Nominees	Ref.
2000	Luis Miguel	Amarte Es un Placer	Ketama – Toma Ketama!; Maná – MTV Unplugged; Pablo Milanés – Vengo Naciendo; Shakira – MTV Unplugged	
2001–2011	—N/a			
2012	Jesse & Joy	¿Con Quién Se Queda El Perro?	Pablo Alborán – En Acústico; Chambao – Chambao; Beatriz Luengo – Bela y sus Moskitas Muertas; Pamela Rodríguez – Reconocer	
2013	Alejandro Sanz	La Música No Se Toca	Miguel Bosé – Papitwo; Draco Rosa – Vida; Aleks Syntek – Syntek; Julieta Venegas – Los Momentos	
2014	Camila	Elypse	Debi Nova – Soy; Rosario – Rosario; Santana – Corazón (Deluxe Version); Mariana Vega – Mi Burbuja	
2015	Alejandro Sanz	Sirope	Pablo Alborán – Terral; Miguel Bosé – Amo; Pedro Capó – Aquila; Ricky Martin – A Quien Quiera Escuchar	
2016	Jesse & Joy	Un Besito Más	Pablo Alborán – Tour Terral: Tres Noches en Las Ventas; Pablo López – El Mundo y los Amantes Inocentes; Luciano Pereyra – #TuMano; Reik – Des/Amor	
2017	Shakira	El Dorado	David Bisbal – Hijos del Mar; Alejandro Fernández – Rompiendo Fronteras; Camila Luna – Flora y Faῦna; Sebastián Yatra – Extended Play Yatra	
2018	Maluma	F.A.M.E.	Axel — Ser; Pablo López — Camino, Fuego y Libertad; Beatriz Luengo — Cuerpo y Alma; Nana Mendoza — Miradas	
2019	Rosalía	El Mal Querer	Ricardo Montaner — Montaner; Morat — Balas Perdidas; Alejandro Sanz — #ElDisco; Sebastián Yatra — Fantasía	
2020	Ricky Martin	Pausa	Aitana – Spoiler; Beret – Prisma; Camilo – Por Primera Vez; Juanes – Más futuro que pasado	
2021	Camilo	Mis Manos	Andrés Calamaro – Dios los Cría; Pedro Capó – Munay; Danna Paola – K.O.; Reik – De México	
2022	Sebastián Yatra	Dharma	Elsa y Elmar – ya no somos los mismos; Kany García – El Amor Que Merecemos; Jesse & Joy – Clichés; Carla Morrison – El Renacimiento	
2023	Julieta Venegas	Tu Historia	Pablo Alborán – La Cuarta Hoja; AleMor – Beautiful Humans Vol. 1; Camilo – De Adentro Pa Afuera; Pedro Capó – La Neta	
2024	Luis Fonsi	El Viaje	Caloncho – Tofu; Emilia – .mp3; Mau y Ricky – Hotel Caracas; Kali Uchis – Orquídeas; Nicole Zignago – Escrita	
2025	Alejandro Sanz	¿Y Ahora Qué?	Aitana – Cuarto Azul; Elsa y Elmar – Palacio; Joaquina – Al Romper la Burbuja; Elena Rose – En las Nubes - Con Mis Panas	
2025	Alejandro Sanz	¿Y Ahora Qué?+	Pablo Alborán – KM0; Monsieur Periné – Instrucciones Para Ser Feliz; Nic – (Enamorada); Debi Nova – Todo Puede Convertirse en Canción	

== Artists with multiple wins ==
4 wins

- Alejandro Sanz

2 wins

- Jesse & Joy

== Artists with multiple nominations ==
5 nominations

- Pablo Alborán
- Alejandro Sanz

3 nominations

- Pedro Capo
- Jesse & Joy
- Camilo
- Sebastián Yatra

2 nominations

- Debi Nova

== See also ==
- Grammy Award for Best Latin Pop Album
- Latin Grammy Award for Best Female Pop Vocal Album
- Latin Grammy Award for Best Male Pop Vocal Album
