= Los Premios 40 Principales 2014 =

Spanish music awards ceremony

- Date: December 12, 2014
- Venue: Barclaycard Center
- Hosts: Tony Aguilar, Cristina Boscá, Xavi Martínez, Uri Sàbat, Daniela Blume, Dani Moreno, Gema Hurtado
- Networks: Divinity, 40TV

This was the ninth edition of Los Premios 40 Principales, the annual awards organized by Spanish music radio Los 40 Principales. It was held on December 12, 2014 in Madrid's Barclaycard Center (formerly known as Palacio de los Deportes), which has been home to the award show since its creation in 2006.

== Performers ==
Artist(s)	Song(s)
Midnight Red	"Take Me Home"
Leiva	"Terriblemente cruel" "Lady Madrid"
Inna	"Good Time" "Sun Is Up" "Diggy Down" "Cola Song"
Pablo Alborán	"Por Fin" "Pasos de cero"
Sweet California	"This Is the Life"
Cris Cab	"Liar Liar"
Malú	"A prueba de ti"
Maldita Nerea	"Mira dentro"
One Direction	"Steal My Girl"
David Bisbal	"Diez mil maneras" "No amanece"
Birdy	"Wings"
Dvicio	"Paraíso"
Melendi	"Tocado y hundido"
The Vamps	"Oh Cecilia" "Can We Dance"
Wisin	"Adrenalina"

== Awards ==
The following is the list of all winners and nominees from the 2014 edition:

=== Best Spanish Act ===
- Leiva
- Antonio Orozco
- David Bisbal
- Enrique Iglesias
- Malú

=== Best Spanish New Act ===
- Dvicio
- Mr. Kilombo
- Sweet California
- Lucy Paradise
- María Sagana

=== Best Spanish Video ===
- Maldita Nerea - Mira dentro
- Dani Martín - Emocional
- Enrique Iglesias - Bailando
- Dvicio - Paraíso
- Auryn - Puppeteer

=== Best Festival, Tour or Concert in Spain ===
- David Bisbal - Gira Tú y Yo
- Malú - Tour Sí
- Dani Martín - Gira Cero 2014
- Antonio Orozco - Gira Ozean's Club
- One Direction - Where We Are World Tour

=== Best Spanish Album ===
- David Bisbal - Tú y yo
- Enrique Iglesias - Sex + Love
- Leiva - Pólvora
- Malú - Sí
- Antonio Orozco - Dos orillas

=== Best Spanish Song ===
- Enrique Iglesias - Bailando
- Leiva - Terriblemente cruel
- David Bisbal - Diez mil maneras
- Antonio Orozco - Llegará
- Malú - A prueba de ti

=== Best International Act ===
- Coldplay
- Jason Derülo
- Pharrell Williams
- One Direction
- OneRepublic

=== Best International Album ===
- Ed Sheeran - "X"
- One Direction - "Midnight Memories"
- Katy Perry - "Prism"
- Birdy - "Fire Within"
- Jason Derülo - "Tattoos"

=== Best International Song ===
- Jason Derülo - "Talk Dirty"
- Pharrell Williams - "Happy"
- Miley Cyrus - "Wrecking Ball"
- Avicii - "Hey Brother"
- OneRepublic - "Counting Stars"

=== Best International New Act ===
- Milky Chance
- The Vamps
- Ariana Grande
- Lorde
- Birdy

=== Best Latin Act ===
- Shakira
- Pitbull
- Jennifer Lopez
- Ricky Martin
- Wisin

=== Best International Video ===
- Pharrell Williams - "Happy"
- Miley Cyrus - "Wrecking Ball"
- Jason Derülo - "Wiggle"
- One Direction - "Story of My Life"
- Katy Perry - "Dark Horse"

=== Honorable Mentions ===
- Best international tour by a Spanish act: David Bisbal
- Best Spanish rock act: Leiva

== Los Premios 40 Principales América 2014 ==
The second edition of Los Premios 40 Principales América was held on November 13, 2014 in Buenos Aires, Argentina. The following is the list of nominees and winners:

=== Best Mexican Act ===
- Camila
- Zoé
- Molotov
- Café Tacuba
- Jenny and the Mexicats

=== Best Colombian Act ===
- Piso 21
- Carlos Vives
- Naela
- Maluma
- Alkilados

=== Best Argentine Act ===
- Tan Biónica
- Axel
- Miranda!
- Abel Pintos
- Banda de Turistas

=== Best Chilean Act ===
- Francisca Valenzuela
- Gondwana
- Gepe
- Ana Tijoux
- Javiera Mena

=== Best Panamanian Act ===
- Comando Tiburón
- Nigga
- Martin Machore
- Joey Montana
- I-Nesta

=== Best Costa Rican Act ===
- Los Ajenos
- Cocofunka
- Percance
- Ojo de Buey
- Por Partes

=== Best Ecuadorian Act ===
- David Cañizares
- Maykel
- Daniel Betancourth
- Nikki Macliff
- Daniel Páez

=== Best Guatemalan Act ===
- Pedro Cuevas
- Flaminia
- Tijuana Love
- Piva
- Ale Mendoza

=== Best Paraguayan Act ===
- Kchiporros
- Iván Zavala
- Paiko
- Humbertiko & Urbanos
- Salamandra

=== Best Dominican Act ===
- Vicente García
- Romeo Santos
- Prince Royce
- Los Ilegales
- Aura

=== Best Spanish Language Act ===
- Enrique Iglesias
- Juanes
- Alejandro Sanz
- Daddy Yankee
- Romeo Santos

=== Best Spanish Language Album ===
- Enrique Iglesias - Sex + Love
- Carlos Vives - Corazón profundo
- Shakira - Shakira
- Prince Royce - Soy el mismo
- Romeo Santos - Formula vol. 2

=== Best Spanish Language Song ===
- Enrique Iglesias ft. Descemer Bueno & Gente de Zona - "Bailando"
- J Balvin ft. Farruko - "6 AM"
- Wisin ft. Jennifer Lopez & Ricky Martin - "Adrenalina"
- Prince Royce - "Darte un beso"
- Jesse & Joy - "Llorar"

=== Best English Language Act ===
- One Direction
- Daft Punk
- Bruno Mars
- Calvin Harris
- Katy Perry

=== Best English Language Song ===
- Daft Punk ft. Pharrell Williams - "Get Lucky"
- Pharrell Williams - "Happy"
- Robin Thicke ft. T.I. & Pharrell Williams - "Blurred Lines"
- Clean Bandit ft. Jess Glynne - "Rather Be"
- Calvin Harris - "Summer"

=== Special awards ===
- Most International Spanish-Language Act: David Bisbal
- Special Jury Award: Train
