= Palmeras =

Palmeras means palm trees in Spanish. It may also refer to:

- Palm Trees in the Snow, a 2015 Spanish romantic drama film
- Palmeras, the Spanish name for palmiers
- Palmeras, a song recorded by Spanish singer India Martínez
- Palmeras en la nieve (song), a song recorded by Spanish singer Pablo Alborán
