= List of number-one singles of 2014 (Spain) =

This lists the singles that reached number one on the Spanish Promusicae sales and airplay charts in 2014. Total sales correspond to the data sent by regular contributors to sales volumes and by digital distributors.

== Chart history ==
Week	Top Selling				Week	Most Airplay			
Week	Issue date	Artist(s)	Song	Reference(s)	Week	Issue date	Artist(s)	Song	Reference(s)
1	January 5	Avicii	"Hey Brother"		1	January 3	Ellie Goulding	"Burn"	
2	January 12	Avicii	"Hey Brother"		2	January 10	Malú	"A Prueba De Tí"	
3	January 19	Enrique Iglesias feat. Romeo Santos	"Loco"		3	January 17	Miley Cyrus	"Wrecking Ball"	
4	January 26	David Bisbal	"Diez Mil Maneras"		4	January 24	Ellie Goulding	"Burn"	
5	February 2	David Bisbal	"Diez Mil Maneras"		5	January 31	Antonio Orozco	"Llegará"	
6	February 9	David Bisbal	"Diez Mil Maneras"		6	February 7	Avicii	"Hey Brother"	
7	February 16	David Bisbal	"Diez Mil Maneras"		7	February 14	Avicii	"Hey Brother"	
8	February 23	David Bisbal	"Diez Mil Maneras"		8	February 21	Shakira feat. Rihanna	"Can't Remember to Forget You"	
9	March 2	David Bisbal	"Diez Mil Maneras"		9	February 28	Shakira feat. Rihanna	"Can't Remember to Forget You"	
10	March 9	David Bisbal	"Diez Mil Maneras"		10	March 7	Shakira feat. Rihanna	"Can't Remember to Forget You"	
11	March 16	David Bisbal	"Diez Mil Maneras"		11	March 14	Pharrell Williams	"Happy"	
12	March 23	Pharrell Williams	"Happy"		12	March 21	David Bisbal	"Diez Mil Maneras"	
13	March 30	Shakira	"Boig per Tu"		13	March 29	Pharrell Williams	"Happy"	
14	April 6	Pharrell Williams	"Happy"		14	April 4	Pharrell Williams	"Happy"	
15	April 13	Pharrell Williams	"Happy"		15	April 11	Pharrell Williams	"Happy"	
16	April 20	Enrique Iglesias feat. Gente de Zona y Descemer Bueno	"Bailando"		16	April 18	Pharrell Williams	"Happy"	
17	April 27	Enrique Iglesias feat. Gente de Zona y Descemer Bueno	"Bailando"		17	April 25	Pharrell Williams	"Happy"	
18	May 4	Enrique Iglesias feat. Gente de Zona y Descemer Bueno	"Bailando"		18	May 2	Pharrell Williams	"Happy"	
19	May 11	Enrique Iglesias feat. Gente de Zona y Descemer Bueno	"Bailando"		19	May 9	Pharrell Williams	"Happy"	
20	May 18	Enrique Iglesias feat. Gente de Zona y Descemer Bueno	"Bailando"		20	May 16	Pharrell Williams	"Happy"	
21	May 25	Enrique Iglesias feat. Gente de Zona y Descemer Bueno	"Bailando"		21	May 23	Pharrell Williams	"Happy"	
22	June 1	Real Madrid feat. Redone	"Hala Madrid ...y Nada Más"		22	May 30	Enrique Iglesias feat. Gente de Zona y Descemer Bueno	"Bailando"	
23	June 8	Enrique Iglesias feat. Gente de Zona y Descemer Bueno	"Bailando"		23	June 6	Enrique Iglesias feat. Gente de Zona y Descemer Bueno	"Bailando"	
24	June 15	Enrique Iglesias feat. Gente de Zona y Descemer Bueno	"Bailando"		24	June 13	Enrique Iglesias feat. Gente de Zona y Descemer Bueno	"Bailando"	
25	June 22	Enrique Iglesias feat. Gente de Zona y Descemer Bueno	"Bailando"		25	June 20	Enrique Iglesias feat. Gente de Zona y Descemer Bueno	"Bailando"	
26	June 29	Enrique Iglesias feat. Gente de Zona y Descemer Bueno	"Bailando"		26	June 27	Enrique Iglesias feat. Gente de Zona y Descemer Bueno	"Bailando"	
27	July 6	Enrique Iglesias feat. Gente de Zona y Descemer Bueno	"Bailando"		27	July 4	Enrique Iglesias feat. Gente de Zona y Descemer Bueno	"Bailando"	
28	July 13	Enrique Iglesias feat. Gente de Zona y Descemer Bueno	"Bailando"		28	July 11	Enrique Iglesias feat. Gente de Zona y Descemer Bueno	"Bailando"	
29	July 20	Enrique Iglesias feat. Gente de Zona y Descemer Bueno	"Bailando"		29	July 18	Enrique Iglesias feat. Gente de Zona y Descemer Bueno	"Bailando"	
30	July 27	Enrique Iglesias feat. Gente de Zona y Descemer Bueno	"Bailando"		30	July 25	Enrique Iglesias feat. Gente de Zona y Descemer Bueno	"Bailando"	
31	August 3	Auryn	"Puppeteer"		31	August 1	Enrique Iglesias feat. Gente de Zona y Descemer Bueno	"Bailando"	
32	August 10	Enrique Iglesias feat. Gente de Zona y Descemer Bueno	"Bailando"		32	August 8	Enrique Iglesias feat. Gente de Zona y Descemer Bueno	"Bailando"	
33	August 17	Enrique Iglesias feat. Gente de Zona y Descemer Bueno	"Bailando"		33	August 15	Enrique Iglesias feat. Gente de Zona y Descemer Bueno	"Bailando"	
34	August 24	Enrique Iglesias feat. Gente de Zona y Descemer Bueno	"Bailando"		34	August 22	Enrique Iglesias feat. Gente de Zona y Descemer Bueno	"Bailando"	
35	August 31	Enrique Iglesias feat. Gente de Zona y Descemer Bueno	"Bailando"		35	August 29	Enrique Iglesias feat. Gente de Zona y Descemer Bueno	"Bailando"	
36	September 7	Enrique Iglesias feat. Gente de Zona y Descemer Bueno	"Bailando"		36	September 5	Nico & Vinz	"Am I Wrong"	
37	September 14	Enrique Iglesias feat. Gente de Zona y Descemer Bueno	"Bailando"		37	September 12	Enrique Iglesias feat. Gente de Zona y Descemer Bueno	"Bailando"	
38	September 21	Pablo Alborán	"Por Fin"		38	September 19	Nico & Vinz	"Am I Wrong"	
39	September 28	Pablo Alborán	"Por Fin"		39	September 26	Lilly Wood & The Prick and Robin Schulz	"Prayer in C (Robin Schulz Radio Edit)"	
40	October 5	Lilly Wood & The Prick and Robin Schulz	"Prayer in C (Robin Schulz Radio Edit)"		40	October 3	Magic!	"Rude"	
41	October 12	Pablo Alborán	"Pasos de cero"		41	October 10	Magic!	"Rude"	
42	October 19	Pablo López	"El mejor momento"		42	October 17	Coldplay	"A Sky Full of Stars"	
43	October 26	Juan Magán feat. Belinda & Lapiz Conciente	"Si no te quisiera"		43	October 24	Lilly Wood & The Prick and Robin Schulz	"Prayer in C (Robin Schulz Radio Edit)"	
44	November 2	Juan Magán feat. Belinda & Lapiz Conciente	"Si no te quisiera"		44	October 31	Sia	"Chandelier"	
45	November 9	Meghan Trainor	"All About That Bass"		45	November 7	Sia	"Chandelier"	
46	November 16	Meghan Trainor	"All About That Bass"		46	November 14	Sia	"Chandelier"	
47	November 23	Band Aid 30	"Do They Know It's Christmas? (2014)"		47	November 21	Sia	"Chandelier"	
48	November 30	David Guetta feat. Sam Martin	"Dangerous"		48	November 28	Meghan Trainor	"All About That Bass"	
49	December 7	David Guetta feat. Sam Martin	"Dangerous"		49	December 5	Meghan Trainor	"All About That Bass"	
50	December 14	Meghan Trainor	"All About That Bass"		50	December 12	Meghan Trainor	"All About That Bass"	
51	December 21	David Guetta feat. Sam Martin	"Dangerous"		51	December 19	Sia	"Chandelier"	
52	December 28	Meghan Trainor	"All About That Bass"		52	December 26	Sia	"Chandelier"	
