= 16th Annual Latin Grammy Awards =

Music awards presented Nov 2015

16th Latin Grammy Awards
- Date: November 19, 2015
- Venue: MGM Grand Garden Arena, Paradise, Nevada

Highlights
- Person of the Year: Roberto Carlos

Television/radio coverage
- Network: Univision

The 16th Annual Latin Grammy Awards were held on November 19, 2015 at the MGM Grand Garden Arena in Las Vegas. This was the second time that Latin Grammys were held at this venue.

The nominations were announced on September 23, 2015. Leonel García leads with six nominations, followed by Natalia Lafourcade with five. Additionally, Juan Luis Guerra and Alejandro Sanz; engineers Edgar Barrera, Demián Nava, and Alan Saucedo; and producer Cachorro López each receive four nominations. Pablo Alborán, Miguel Bosé, Café Quijano, Pedro Capó, Nicky Jam, Ricky Martin, and Vicentico are among those who each receive three nominations. Brazilian singer Roberto Carlos will be honored as the Latin Recording Academy Person of the Year on November 18, the day prior to the Latin Grammy Awards.

== Performers ==
Artist(s)	Song(s)
J Balvin; Farruko; Major Lazer; MØ	"Ginza" "Lean On"
Alejandro Sanz; Paula Fernandes; Mariachi Sol De México	"A Que No Me Dejas"
Banda El Recodo De Don Cruz Lizárraga; Wisin	"Mi Vicio Más Grande" "Las Fresas"
Prince Royce	"Back It Up"
Matisse	"Si Fuera Fácil"
Raquel Sofía	"Te Amo Idiota"
ChocQuibTown	"Salsa & Choke"
Pablo Alborán	"Recuérdame"
Ricky Martin	"Disparo al Corazón "La Mordidita"
Natalia Jiménez; Il Volo	"Creo en Mi"
Nicky Jam; Omi	"El Perdón" "Cheerleader"
Maná; Los Tigres Del Norte	"Ironía" "Somos Más Americanos"
Bomba Estéreo; Will Smith	"Fiesta"
Roberto Carlos	"Te Amo, Te Amo, Te Amo" "Propuesta" "La Distancia" "Un Millón de Amigos"
Wisin; Ricky Martin	"Que Se Sienta el Deseo"
Espinoza Paz	"Como a las 12"
Maluma; Fifth Harmony	"Sin Contrato"
Natalia Lafourcade	"Hasta la Raíz"
Juan Luis Guerra	"Todo Tiene Su Hora"
Julión Álvarez	"El Amor De Su Vida"
Silvestre Dangond; Nicky Jam	"Materialista"

== Awards ==
The following is the list of nominees.

=== General ===
Record of the Year

Natalia Lafourcade — "Hasta la Raíz"

- Bomba Estéreo — "Fiesta"
- Miguel Bosé — "Encanto"
- Café Quijano — "Será (Vida de Hombre)"
- Camila featuring Marco Antonio Solís — "La Vida Entera"
- Leonel García featuring Jorge Drexler — "Ella Es"
- Juan Luis Guerra 4.40 — "Tus Besos"
- Ricky Martin — "Disparo al Corazón"
- Alejandro Sanz — "Un Zombie a la Intemperie"
- Julieta Venegas — "Ese Camino"

Album of the Year

Juan Luis Guerra 4.40 — Todo Tiene Su Hora

- Pepe Aguilar — MTV Unplugged
- Rubén Blades and Roberto Delgado & Orquesta — Son de Panamá
- Miguel Bosé — Amo
- Café Quijano — Orígenes: El Bolero Volumen 3
- Natalia Jiménez — Creo en Mí
- Natalia Lafourcade — Hasta la Raíz
- Monsieur Periné — Caja de Música
- Alejandro Sanz — Sirope
- María Toledo — ConSentido

Song of the Year

Leonel García and Natalia Lafourcade — "Hasta la Raíz" (Lafourcade)

- Pedro Capó, Yoel Henríquez, Ricky Martin and Rafael Esparza Ruiz — "Disparo al Corazón" (Ricky Martin)
- Julieta Venegas — "Ese Camino"
- Beatriz Luengo, Antonio Rayo Gibo, Yotuel Romero and Diego Torres — "Hoy Es Domingo" (Diego Torres)
- Pablo Alborán — "Por Fin"
- Claudia Brant and Natalia Jiménez — "Quédate Con Ella" (Natalia Jiménez)
- Leonel García — "¿Recuerdas?"
- Alejandro Sanz — "Un Zombie a la Intemperie"
- Gian Marco — "Vida de Mi Vida"
- Pedro Capó — "Vivo"

Best New Artist

Monsieur Periné

- Kaay
- Iván "Melón" Lewis
- Manu Manzo
- Matisse
- Julieta Rada
- Tulipa Ruiz
- Raquel Sofía
- Vazquez Sounds
- Vitrola Sintética

=== Pop ===
Best Contemporary Pop Vocal Album

Alejandro Sanz — Sirope

- Pablo Alborán — Terral
- Miguel Bosé — Amo
- Pedro Capó — Aquila
- Ricky Martin — A Quien Quiera Escuchar

Best Traditional Pop Vocal Album

Gilberto Santa Rosa — Necesito Un Bolero

- Astrid Asher — Astrid Asher
- Café Quijano — Orígenes: El Bolero Volumen 3
- Mojito Lite — Nada Es Demasiado
- Vicentico — Último Acto

=== Urban ===
Best Urban Performance

Nicky Jam and Enrique Iglesias — "El Perdón"

- Alexis & Fido — "A Ti Te Encanta"
- Alkilados featuring J Alvarez, El Roockie and Nicky Jam — "Una Cita (Remix)"
- J Balvin — "Ay Vamos"
- Maluma — "El Tiki"
- Yandel — "Calentura"
- Daddy Yankee — "Sígueme Y Te Sigo"

Best Urban Music Album

Tego Calderón — El Que Sabe, Sabe

- Farruko — Farruko Presenta: Los Menores
- Nicky Jam — Greatest Hits Vol 1
- Don Omar — The Last Don 2
- Yandel — Legacy: De Lider a Leyenda Tour (Deluxe Edition)

Best Urban Song

J Balvin, Rene Cano, Alejandro "Mosty" Patiño and Alejandro "Sky" Ramírez — "Ay Vamos" (J Balvin)

- Alexis & Fido and Juan Jesús Santana — "A Ti Te Encanta" (Alexis & Fido)
- Ilya, Savan Kotecha, Pitbull and Prince Royce — "Back It Up (Spanish Version)" (Prince Royce featuring Jennifer Lopez and Pitbull)
- Tego Calderón and Ernesto Padilla — "Dando Break" (Tego Calderón)
- Carlos Ortiz, Luis Ortiz and Daddy Yankee — "Sígueme Y Te Sigo" (Daddy Yankee)

=== Rock ===
Best Rock Album

Diamante Eléctrico — B

- Charliepapa — Y/O
- Cuca — La Venganza De Cucamonga
- La Gusana Ciega — Monarca
- No Te Va Gustar — El Tiempo Otra Vez Avanza

Best Pop/Rock Album

Maná — Cama Incendiada

- El Cuarteto de Nos — Habla Tu Espejo
- Mikel Erentxun — Corazones
- Manolo García — Todo Es Ahora
- Camila Luna — Flamboyán
- Moderatto — Malditos Pecadores

Best Rock Song

Cachorro López and Vicentico — "Esclavo de Tu Amor" (Vicentico)

- Charliepapa — "Astrómetra"
- Daniel Aceves and Jotdog — "Celebración" (Jotdog)
- Adolfo Cabrales and Carlos Raya — "Entre La Espada y La Pared" (Fito & Fitipaldis)
- Daniel Álvarez and Juan Galeano — "Todo Va A Arder" (Diamante Eléctrico)

=== Alternative ===
Best Alternative Music Album

Natalia Lafourcade — Hasta la Raíz

- Bomba Estéreo — Amanecer
- Centavrvs — Sombras de Oro
- Los Auténticos Decadentes — Y La Banda Sigue
- Porter — Moctezuma

Best Alternative Song

Leonel García and Natalia Lafourcade — "Hasta la Raíz" (Lafourcade)

- Famasloop — "Allí Estás"
- Andrés Nusser — "Caribbean" (Astro)
- Roberto Musso — "No Llora" (El Cuarteto de Nos)
- Javiera Mena — "Otra Era"

=== Tropical ===
Best Salsa Album

Rubén Blades with Roberto Delgado and Orquesta — Son de Panamá

- Luis Enrique — Jukebox Primera Edición
- Víctor Manuelle — Que Suenen los Tambores
- Ismael Miranda — Son 45
- Rey Ruiz — Estaciones

Best Cumbia/Vallenato Album

Jorge Celedón and Gustavo García — Sencillamente

- Américo — Por Siempre
- Silvestre Dangond and Lucas Dangond — Sigo Invicto
- Gusi — Al Son de Mi Corazón
- Iván Villazón and Saúl Lallemand — El Camino de Mi Existencia

Best Contemporary Tropical Album

Juan Luis Guerra 4.40 — Todo Tiene Su Hora

- Lucas Arnau — Buen Camino
- Leslie Grace — Lloviendo Estrellas
- Guaco — Presente Continuo
- Johnny Sky — Johnny Sky

Best Traditional Tropical Album

José Alberto "El Canario" and Septeto Santiaguero — Tributo A Los Compadres No Quiero Llanto

- Checo Acosta — #SiguedeModa
- Rafael "Pollo" Brito — Homenaje A Tito Rodríguez
- Alain Pérez — El Alma del Son – Tributo A Matamoros
- Sonlokos — Locos Por El Son

Best Tropical Fusion Album

ChocQuibTown — El Mismo

- Chino & Nacho — Radio Universo
- Daiquiri — Esa Morena
- Juan Magan — The King is Back
- Jorge Villamizar — El Día Que Vuelva

Best Tropical Song

Juan Luis Guerra — "Tus Besos"

- Andrés Castro and Víctor Manuelle — "Agua Bendita" (Víctor Manuelle)
- Edgar Barrera, Efraín Dávila, Guianko Gómez and Leslie Grace — "Cómo Duele El Silencio" (Leslie Grace)
- Gusi — "Tú Tienes Razón (Bachata)"
- Alex Cuba, Luis Enrique and Fernando Osorio — "Ya Comenzó" (Luis Enrique)

=== Singer-songwriter ===
Best Singer-Songwriter Album

Alex Cuba — Healer

- Santiago Cruz — Equilibrio
- Leonel García — Amor Futuro
- Marta Gómez — Este Instante
- Gian Marco — #Libre

=== Regional Mexican ===
Best Ranchero Album

Pedro Fernández — Acaríciame El Corazón

- Aida Cuevas — Pa' Que Sientas Lo Que Siento
- Mariachi Flor de Toloache — Mariachi Flor de Toloache
- Mariachi Los Arrieros del Valle — Alegría del Mariachi
- Diego Verdaguer — Mexicano Hasta Las Pampas 2

Best Banda Album

Banda El Recodo de Don Cruz Lizarraga — Mi Vicio Mas Grande

- Julión Álvarez y Su Norteño Banda — El Aferrado
- Banda Rancho Viejo — Dejando Huella
- El Coyote y Su Banda Tierra Santa — Alucine
- La Arrolladora Banda El Limón de René Camacho — Ojos En Blanco

Best Tejano Album

Sólido — Sentimientos

- Alazzan — Tributo Al Amor y Dolor
- La Fiebre — Nueva Era
- Los Gallitos — Dueña de Mi Amor
- Ruben Ramos and the Mexican Revolution — El Ídolo de Tejas
- Elida Reyna and Avante — Al Fin Completa

Best Norteño Album

Pesado — Abrázame

- Ariel Camacho y Los Plebes del Rancho — El Karma
- La Energía Norteña — Cruzando Territorio
- Remmy Valenzuela — Mi Vida En Vida
- Voz de Mando — Levantando Polvadera

Best Regional Song

Mauricio Arriaga, Edgar Barrera and Eduardo Murguía — "Todo Tuyo" (Banda El Recodo de Cruz Lizárraga)

- Julio Bahumea — "El Amor De Su Vida" (Julión Álvarez y Su Norteño Banda)
- José Alberto Inzunza and Luciano Luna — "Me Sobrabas Tú" (Banda Los Recoditos)
- Raúl Jiménez E. and Chucho Rincón — "Para Que Nunca Llores" (Diego Verdaguer)
- Espinoza Paz — "Perdí La Pose"

=== Instrumental ===
Best Instrumental Album

Ed Calle and Mamblue — Dr. Ed Calle Presents Mamblue

- Antonio Adolfo — Tema
- Chick Corea Trio — Triology
- Kenny G — Brazilian Nights
- Gustavo Santaolalla — Camino

=== Traditional ===
Best Folk Album

Lila Downs — Balas y Chocolate

- Reynaldo Armas — La Muerte del Rucio Moro
- Ciro Hurtado — Ayahuasca Dreams
- Los Tekis — Hijos de La Tierra
- Teresa Parodi — 30 Años + 5 Días

Best Tango Album

Orquesta del Tango de Buenos Aires — Homenaje A Astor Piazzolla

- Ariel Ardit — Aníbal Troilo 100 Años
- Octavio Brunetti and Elmira Darvarova — Piazzolla: Desde Estudios A Tangos
- Quinteto Leopoldo Federico — Bogotá - Buenos Aires
- Berta Rojas and Camerata Bariloche — Historia Del Tango - History Of Tango
- Selección Nacional de Tango — Troilo 100 Años

Best Flamenco Album

Various Artists — Entre 20 Aguas: A La Música de Paco de Lucía

- Joselito Acedo — Andando
- Argentina — Sinergia
- Blas Córdoba "El Kejío" and Chano Domínguez — Bendito
- Estrella Morente & Niño Josele — Amar En Paz
- Miguel Poveda — Sonetos Y Poemas Para La Libertad
- María Toledo — conSentido

=== Jazz ===
Best Latin Jazz Album

Paquito D'Rivera — Jazz Meets The Classics

- Eddie Fernández — Jazzeando
- Iván "Melón" Lewis — Ayer Y Hoy
- José Negroni — Negroni Piano +9
- José Valentino Ruiz and the Latin Jazz Ensemble featuring Giovanni Hidalgo — I Make You Want To Move

=== Christian ===
Best Christian Album (Spanish Language)

Alex Campos — Derroche de Amor

- Marco Barrientos — Amanece
- Emmanuel Y Linda — Voy Tras de Ti con Todo
- Son by Four — Mujer Frente a La Cruz
- Tercer Cielo — Irreversible

Best Christian Album (Portuguese Language)

Fernanda Brum — Da Eternidade

- Anderson Freire — Ao Vivo
- Jane Gomes — Posso Tudo Nele
- Bruna Karla — Como Águia
- Wilian Nascimento — Não Vou Desistir

=== Brazilian ===
Best Brazilian Contemporary Pop Album

Tulipa Ruiz — Dancê

- Jamz — Insano
- Seu Jorge — Músicas Para Churrasco Vol. 2
- Onze:20 — Vida Loka
- Jonas Sá — Blam! Blam!

Best Brazilian Rock Album

Suricato — Sol-Te

- Banda do Mar — Banda do Mar
- Humberto Gessinger — Insular Ao Vivo
- Malta — Supernova
- Pato Fu — Não Pare Pra Pensar

Best Samba/Pagode Album

Fundo de Quintal — Só Felicidade

- Nilze Carvalho — Verde Amarelo Negro Anil
- Arlindo Cruz — Herança Popular
- Mart'nália — Em Samba! Ao Vivo
- Diogo Nogueira and Hamilton de Holanda — Bossa Negra
- Zeca Pagodinho — Ser Humano
- Sorriso Maroto — Sorriso Eu Gosto - Ao Vivo No Maracanãzinho

Best MPB Album

Ivan Lins — América, Brasil

- Maria Bethânia — Meus Quintais
- Dorival Caymmi — Centenário Caymmi
- Maria Gadú — Guelã
- Lenine — Carbono

Best Sertaneja Music Album

Renato Teixeira and Sérgio Reis — Amizade Sincera II

- Jorge & Mateus — Os Anjos Cantam
- Leonardo & Eduardo Costa — Cabaré
- Michel Teló — Bem Sertanejo
- Victor & Leo — Irmãos

Best Brazilian Song

Hamilton de Holanda, Diogo Nogueira and Marcos Portinari — "Bossa Negra" (Diogo Nogueira and Hamilton de Holanda)

- Bruno Boncini — "Diz Pra Mim" (Malta)
- Mallu Magalhães — "Mais Ninguém" (Banda do Mar)
- Dudu Falcão and Lenine — "Simples Assim" (Lenine)
- Adriana Calcanhotto and Bebel Gilberto — "Tudo" (Bebel Gilberto)

=== Children's ===
Best Latin Children’s Album

Mister G — Los Animales

- Chino & Nacho — Chino & Nacho for Babies
- Lucky Díaz and the Family Jam Band — Adelante
- Rockcito — De La Cuna A La Jungla
- 123 Andrés — ¡Uno, Dos, Tres, Andrés! En Español y En Inglés

=== Classical ===
Best Classical Album

Débora Halász, Franz Halász and Radamés Gnattali — Alma Brasileira
Gabriela Montero — Piano Concerto No. 2, Op. 18 - Montero: Ex Patria, Op. 1 & Improvisations

- José Serebrier — Dvorak-Serebrier Legends: Symphony No. 8
- Fernando Otero — Ritual
- Cuarteto Latinoamericano — Ruperto Chapí: String Quartets 1&2
- Iván Valiente — Works For String Orchestra

Best Classical Contemporary Composition

Carlos Franzetti — "Capriccio" (Allison Brewster Franzetti)

- José Serebrier conducting the Málaga Philharmonic and the FIU Concert Choir — "Auschwitz (Nunca Se Olvidarán)" (Orlando Jacinto García)
- Miguel del Águila — "Concierto En Tango Op. 110 For Cello And Orchestra" (JoAnn Falletta conducting the Buffalo Philharmonic Orchestra)
- Fernando Otero — "Conexión"
- Yalil Guerra — "El Retrato de La Paloma" (Iván Valiente conducting the Ensamble Solistas de La Habana)
- Roberto Sierra — "Trio No. 4 "La Noche"" (Arcos Trío)

=== Recording Package ===
Best Recording Package

Natalia Ayala, Carlos Dussan Gómez and Juliana Jaramillo — Este Instante (Marta Gómez)

- Julia Rocha — Blam! Blam! (Jonas Sá)
- Anna Amendola — Noel Rosa, Preto E Branco (Valéria Lobão)
- Pablo González and Francisca Valenzuela — Tajo Abierto (Francisca Valenzuela)
- Laura Varsky — Veinte Años El Grito Después (Catupecu Machu)

=== Production ===
Best Engineered Album

Andrés Borda, Eduardo del Águila, Demián Nava, Alan Ortiz Grande, Alan Saucedo, Sebastián Schunt, Cesar Sogbe and José Blanco — Hasta la Raíz (Natalia Lafourcade)

- Salome Limón and Caco Refojo — Astrid Asher (Astrid Asher)
- Daniel Musy, Daniel Musy and Andre Dias — Baile do Almeidinha (Hamilton de Holanda)
- Jonathan Allen, Rodrigo de Castro Lopes, Pete Karam and Paul Blakemore — Made in Brazil (Eliane Elias)
- Otávio Carvalho and Felipe Tichauer — Sintético (Vitrola Sintética)

Producer of the Year

Sebastian Krys

- Mario Adnet and Dori Caymmi
- Aníbal Kerpel and Gustavo Santaolalla
- George Noriega
- Kenny O'brien and Manuel Quijano
- Andrés Saavedra

=== Music video ===
Best Short Form Music Video

Calle 13 featuring Silvio Rodríguez — "Ojos Color Sol"

- Willbert Álvarez — "Te Busqué"
- Calle 13 — "Así de Grandes Son las Ideas"
- El Cuarteto de Nos — "No Llora"
- Porter — "Huitzil"

Best Long Form Music Video

Juanes — Loco de Amor: La Historia

- Pablo Alborán — Terral
- Kinky — MTV Unplugged
- Ara Malikian — 15
- Vicentico — Último Acto

== Special Merit Awards ==
The following is a list of special merit awards

Lifetime Achievement Awards

- Gato Barbieri
- Ana Belén and Víctor Manuel
- Angela Carrasco
- Djavan
- El Gran Combo de Puerto Rico
- Pablo Milanés

Trustees Award

- Federico Britos
- Humberto Gatica
- Chelique Sarabia

== Changes to award categories ==
Due to the low number of entries, the Best Brazilian Roots Album category was not awarded this year.
