= No Vaya a Ser =

Single by Pablo Alborán

from the album Prometo
- Language: Spanish
- English title: "It's Not Going to Be"
- Released: 8 September 2017
- Length: 3:18
- Label: Warner Spain
- Songwriter(s): Pablo Alborán
- Producer(s): Julio Reyes Copello

Pablo Alborán singles chronology
"Saturno" (2017)	"No Vaya a Ser" (2017)	"Prometo" (2018)

"No Vaya a Ser" is a song by Spanish singer-songwriter Pablo Alborán from his fourth studio album, Prometo (2017). It was written by Alborán and produced by Julio Reyes Copello. The song was released by Warner Music Spain on 8 September 2017.

== Charts ==
Chart (2017)	Peak position
Colombia (National-Report)	39
Costa Rica (Monitor Latino)	4
Mexico Airplay (Billboard)	18
Spain (PROMUSICAE)	9
Uruguay (Monitor Latino)	6
Venezuela (National-Report)	62

== Certifications ==
Region	Certification	Certified units/sales
Spain (PROMUSICAE)	2× Platinum	80,000^{‡}
United States (RIAA)	Gold (Latin)	30,000^{‡}
^{‡} Sales+streaming figures based on certification alone.
