= De akí a Ketama =

De Aki A Ketama

Studio album by Ketama
- Released: 1995
- Genre: Flamenco
- Label: Universal Music Spain S.A.

Professional ratings
Review scores
Source	Rating
AllMusic	3/5 stars

De Aki A Ketama is a fusion flamenco album by Spanish band Ketama. It gave the group mainstream recognition within Spain. The album sold over 600,000 copies.

== Track listing ==
All tracks by Ketama except where noted.

1. "No estamos lokos (kalikeño)" – 4:34
2. "Verdadero" – 4:13
3. "Se dejaba llevar por ti" (Antonio Vega) – 4:18
4. "Loko" – 5:30
5. "Flor de lis" (Djavan) – 4:35
6. "La cuesta la cava (Ketama)" – 4:34
7. "Acaba de nacer" – 3:42
8. "Djamana Djana" – 4:17
9. "Problema" – 4:21
10. "Vengo de Borrachera" – 4:31
11. "Vente Pá Madrid" – 4:47
12. "Bulería del Olivar" – 6:33

== Personnel ==
- Valentín Álvarez – Saxophone
- Pedro Barceló – Bateria
- Antonio Carmona – Adaptation, Musician
- Jose Miguel Carmona – Musician
- Juan Carmona – Musician
- Luisi Carmona – Coros
- Gonzalo Castro – Assistant
- José María Cortina – Arranger, Keyboards
- Ricardo Mendoza Davila – Photography
- Jesús Díaz – Assistant
- Luis Dulzaides – Percussion
- Camilo Edwards – Bajo Sexto
- Manuel García – Graphic Assistant
- Paco Ibáñez – Trumpet
- Ketama – Arranger
- Ove Larsson – Trombone
- Carlos Martos – Editing, Mastering
- Bernardo Parrilla – Violin
- Mayte Pizarro – Coros
- Pedro Sánchez – Adaptation, Coros
- Paul Smith – Vestuario
- Gabriel Vidal – Production Director
