= Se Puede Amar =

Single by Pablo Alborán
- Released: 22 April 2016
- Length: 3:37
- Label: Warner Music Spain
- Songwriter: Pablo Alborán

Pablo Alborán singles chronology
"Palmeras en la nieve" (2015)	"Se Puede Amar" (2016)	"Dónde está el Amor" (2016)

"Se Puede Amar" ("You Can Love") is a song recorded by Spanish singer-songwriter Pablo Alborán. The song was released worldwide on 22 April 2016 and peaked at number 6 in Spain; thus becoming Alborán's twelfth top ten single in Spain.

At the 17th Annual Latin Grammy Awards the song has been nominated for Latin Grammy Award for Record of the Year.

The song is the main theme of the Mexican telenovela Tres veces Ana.

== Chart performance ==
Chart (2016)	Peak position
Spain (PROMUSICAE)	6

== Awards and nominations ==
Year	Award	Category	Result
2017	35th TVyNovelas Awards	Best Musical Theme	Won
