= Prometo (song) =

Single by Pablo Alborán

from the album Prometo
- Language: Spanish
- English title: "I Promise"
- Released: 19 January 2018
- Length: 3:53
- Label: Warner Spain
- Songwriter(s): Pablo Alborán
- Producer(s): Julio Reyes Copello

Pablo Alborán singles chronology
"No Vaya a Ser" (2017)	"Prometo" (2018)	"La Llave" (2018)

"Prometo" is a song by Spanish singer-songwriter Pablo Alborán from his fourth studio album of the same name. It was written by Alborán and produced by Julio Reyes Copello. A "piano and strings version" (versión piano y cuerda) was released as the album's first promotional single on 13 October 2017. The song was released on 19 January 2018 as the album's third official single. Alborán described the song as the "most personal" song he's ever written.

== Charts ==
Chart (2017–18)	Peak position
Colombia (National-Report)	100
Mexico Airplay (Billboard)	40
Spain (PROMUSICAE)	35

== Certifications ==
Region	Certification	Certified units/sales
Spain (PROMUSICAE)	Platinum	60,000^{‡}
Spain (PROMUSICAE) Acoustic Version	Gold	30,000^{‡}
^{‡} Sales+streaming figures based on certification alone.
