= Un Zombie a la Intemperie =

Single by Alejandro Sanz

from the album Sirope
- Language: Spanish
- English title: "A Zombie at the Outdoor"
- Released: March 2, 2015
- Genre: Latin pop
- Length: 5:00
- Label: Universal Music Spain
- Songwriter: Alejandro Sanz
- Producer: Sebastian Krys

Alejandro Sanz singles chronology
"Viveme" (2013)	"Un Zombie a la Intemperie" (2015)	"A Que No Me Dejas" (2015)

"Un Zombie a la Intemperie" ("A Zombie at the Outdoor") is a song by Spanish singer-songwriter Alejandro Sanz. "Zombie" was written by Sanz and produced by the Sebastian Krys, and was released as the lead single for Sanz's eleventh studio album Sirope (2015). A salsa version was recorded with Nicaraguan singer Luis Enrique. There is also a version with the Italian singer-songwriter Zucchero. The Spanish charts are listed twice because there are two different charts one includes streaming and the other does not. The song earned a nominations for Record of the Year and Song of the Year at the 16th Latin Grammy Awards.

== Track listing ==
- Digital download
1. "Un Zombie a la Intemperie" - 5:00

== Videoclip ==
- Un Zombie a la intemperie on YouTube
- Un Zombie a la intemperie (ft. Zucchero) on YouTube
- Un Zombie a la intemperie (live, ft. Zucchero) on YouTube

== Charts ==
=== Weekly charts ===
Chart (2015)	Peak position
Colombia (National-Report)	14
Dominican Republic Pop (Monitor Latino)	5
Mexico (Billboard Mexican Airplay)	33
Mexico (Monitor Latino)	16
Spain (Promusicae)	1
Spain (Promusicae)	4
US Hot Latin Songs (Billboard)	19
US Latin Airplay (Billboard)	5
US Latin Pop Airplay (Billboard)	2
US Tropical Airplay (Billboard)	10
US (Monitor Latino)	12

=== Year-end charts ===
Chart (2015)	Position
Spain (PROMUSICAE)	71
US Billboard Hot 100	83

== Certifications ==
Region	Certification	Certified units/sales
Mexico (AMPROFON)	3× Platinum+Gold	210,000^{‡}
Spain (Promusicae)	Gold	20,000^{‡}
^{‡} Sales+streaming figures based on certification alone.
