= Vértigo (Pablo Alborán album) =

Studio album by Pablo Alborán
- Released: 11 December 2020
- Length: 41:42
- Language: Spanish
- Label: Warner Music Spain
- Producer: Julio Reyes Copello

Pablo Alborán chronology
Prometo (2017)	Vértigo (2020)	La Cuarta Hoja (2022)

Singles from Vértigo
- 1. "Si Hubieras Querido" Released: 24 September 2020; 2. "No Está en Tus Planes" Released: 15 October 2021

Vértigo (transl. Vertigo) is the fifth studio album by Spanish singer-songwriter Pablo Alborán. It was released by Warner Music Spain on 11 December 2020. The album received nominations for a Grammy Award for Best Latin Pop Album and at the Latin Grammy Awards for Album of the Year and Best Traditional Pop Vocal Album.

== Background and release ==
The album was released on 11 December 2020, though it was supposed to be released on 6 November 2020, but its release was delayed due to the second wave of the coronavirus in Spain. In an interview with El Comercio, Alborán stated that Vértigo "is an album where I have thrown myself more than ever because it is very sincere, because it comes at a time of vulnerability for everyone in this pandemic. It is an album that I have written between the last tour and this pandemic, so there is a mixture of emotions there. It is an album very faithful to my present too, and very loyal to how I feel."

== Track listing ==
All tracks are written by Pablo Alborán.

No.	Title	Length
1.	"El Salto (Interlude)"	0:21
2.	"Si Hubieras Querido"	3:41
3.	"Corazón Descalzo"	4:14
4.	"De Carne y Hueso"	2:47
5.	"Magalahe (Interlude)"	0:18
6.	"La Fiesta"	3:32
7.	"Reyes, Fuentes y Vinder (Interlude)"	0:16
8.	"Hablemos de Amor"	3:29
9.	"Dicen"	3:30
10.	"Que Siempre Sea Verano"	3:09
11.	"Malabares"	2:57
12.	"Desde la Cumbrecita (Interlude)"	0:18
13.	"El Vendaval"	3:19
14.	"No Está en Tus Planes"	3:25
15.	"Tavira Sin Frenos (Interlude)"	0:12
16.	"Vértigo"	2:59
17.	"Si Hubieras Querido (Acoustic Version)"	3:15

== Charts ==
=== Weekly charts ===
Weekly chart performance for Vértigo
Chart (2020–2021)	Peak position
Portuguese Albums (AFP)	19
Spanish Albums (PROMUSICAE)	1

=== Year-end charts ===
Year-end chart performance for Vértigo
Chart (2020)	Position
Spanish Albums (PROMUSICAE)	3
Chart (2021)	Position
Spanish Albums (PROMUSICAE)	16

== Certifications ==
Certifications for Vértigo
Region	Certification	Certified units/sales
Spain (PROMUSICAE)	2× Platinum	80,000^{‡}
^{‡} Sales+streaming figures based on certification alone.
