= TVyNovelas Award for Best Musical Theme =

Mexican television award

- Awarded for: Best theme for telenovela
- First award: 1994 "Corazón Salvaje" by Manuel Mijares for Corazón salvaje
- Currently held by: 2020 "Rompe" by Paulina Goto for Vencer el miedo

== Winners and nominees ==
=== 1990s ===
Winner	Nominated
12th TVyNovelas Awards
"Corazón Salvaje" by Manuel Mijares for Corazón salvaje	"Buscando el paraíso" by Pedro Fernández and Alejandro Ibarra for Buscando el paraíso; "Los parientes pobres" by Lucero for Los Parientes Pobres
13th TVyNovelas Awards
"El vuelo del águila" by Daniel Catán for El vuelo del águila	
14th TVyNovelas Awards
"Tengo todo contigo" by Alberto Ángel for La dueña	
~~1997~~
16th TVyNovelas Awards
"El alma no tiene color" by Laura Flores and Marco Antonio Solís for El alma no tiene color	
17th TVyNovelas Awards
"El Privilegio de Amar" by Manuel Mijares and Lucero for El Privilegio de Amar	

=== 2000s ===
Winner	Nominated
18th TVyNovelas Awards
"Laberintos de Pasión" by Pedro Fernández for Laberintos de pasión	
19th TVyNovelas Awards
"Enloquéceme" by OV7 for Locura de amor	"Abrázame muy fuerte" by Juan Gabriel for Abrázame muy fuerte; "A mil por hora" by Lynda for Primer amor, a mil por hora
~~2002~~
21st TVyNovelas Awards
"Niña amada mía" by Alejandro Fernández for Niña amada mía	"La otra" by Benny Ibarra and Edith Márquez for La Otra; "Las vías del amor" by Aracely Arámbula for Las vías del amor
22nd TVyNovelas Awards
"Amarte es mi pecado" by Ricardo Montaner and Alessandra Rosaldo for Amarte es mi pecado	"Amor real" by Sin Bandera for Amor real; "De corazón a corazón" by Darina for Velo de novia
23rd TVyNovelas Awards
"La Descarada" by Reyli for Rubí	"Que seas feliz" by Luis Miguel for Apuesta por un amor; "Vivir" by Belinda for Corazones al límite
24th TVyNovelas Awards
"Rebelde" by RBD for Rebelde	"Alborada" by Plácido Domingo for Alborada; "Esta Ausencia" by David Bisbal for Piel de otoño; "Víveme" by Laura Pausini for La madrastra
25th TVyNovelas Awards
"El club de las feas" by Banda El Recodo for La fea más bella	"Antes de que te vayas" by Marco Antonio Solís for Mundo de fieras; "Coleccionista de cancione" by Camila for Las dos caras de Ana; "Dispárame, dispara" by Laura Pausini for Amar sin limites; "Heridas de amor" by Ricardo Montaner for Heridas de amor
~~2008 and 2009~~

=== 2010s ===
Winner	Nominated
28th TVyNovelas Awards
"Mundo de caramelo" by Danna Paola for Atrévete a soñar	"Hasta que el dinero nos separe" by Pedro Fernández for Hasta que el dinero nos separe; "Mañana es para siempre" by Alejandro Fernández for Mañana es para siempre; "Me enamoré de ti" by Chayanne for Corazón salvaje; "Un gancho al corazón" by Playa Limbo for Un gancho al corazón
29th TVyNovelas Awards
"Cuando me enamoro" by Enrique Iglesias and Juan Luis Guerra for Cuando me enamoro	"Esa Hembra es Mala" by Gloria Trevi for Teresa; "Llena de Amor" by Luis Fonsi for Llena de amor; "Para Volver a Amar" by Kany García for Para volver a amar; "Regálame un Beso" by Fanny Lú for Mar de amor
30th TVyNovelas Awards
"Día de Suerte" by Alejandra Guzmán for Una familia con suerte	"A Partir de Hoy" by Maite Perroni and Marco DiMauro for Triunfo del amor; "La Fuerza del Destino" by Sandra Echeverría and Marc Anthony for La fuerza del destino; "Rendirme En Tu Amor" by Anahí and Carlos Ponce for Dos hogares; "Te Dejaré de Amar" by Reyli for La que no podía amar
31st TVyNovelas Awards
"Solo un Suspiro" by Alejandra Orozco and Oscar Cruz for Abismo de pasión	"Cuando manda el corazón" by Vicente Fernández for Amor Bravío; "Corona de lágrimas" by Cristian Castro for Corona de lágrimas
32nd TVyNovelas Awards
"No me compares" by Alejandro Sanz for Amores Verdaderos	"El amor manda" by María José for Porque el amor manda; "Hoy tengo ganas de ti" by Alejandro Fernández and Christina Aguilera for La tempestad
33rd TVyNovelas Awards
"Mi corazón es tuyo" by Axel and Kaay for Mi corazón es tuyo	"El perdedor" by Enrique Iglesias and Marco Antonio Solís for Lo que la vida me robó; "Hoy es un buen día" by Río Roma for El color de la pasión; "Quiero amarte" by Armando Manzanero, Noel Schajris, Samo, Jesús Navarro, Juan Pablo Manzanero and Carlos Macías for Quiero amarte
34th TVyNovelas Awards
"A que no me dejas" by Alejandro Sanz for A que no me dejas	"La trampa" by Joan Sebastián for Amores con trampa; "Si Alguna Vez" by Thalía for Antes muerta que Lichita; "Te prometí" by Manuel Mijares for La sombra del pasado; "La vecina" by Ángeles Azules for La vecina
35th TVyNovelas Awards
"Se Puede Amar" by Pablo Alborán for Tres veces Ana	"Instrumental" for La candidata; "Que lo nuestro se quede nuestro" by Carlos Rivera for Sin rastro de ti; "Mi verdad" by Maná and Shakira for Sueño de amor; "Mi camino eres tú" by Paulina Goto for Un camino hacia el destino
36th TVyNovelas Awards
"Saturno" by Pablo Alborán for Caer en tentación	"Estaré contigo" by Marco Antonio Solís for En tierras salvajes; "Y me pregunto" by Julión Álvarez for La doble vida de Estela Carrillo; "Me declaro culpable" by Manuel Mijares and María José for Me declaro culpable; "Tú eres la razón" by Los Fontana and Angelina for Mi marido tiene familia
37th TVyNovelas Awards
"Me muero" by Carlos Rivera for Amar a muerte	"Tengo" by Timbiriche for Hijas de la luna; "Buena vida" by Daddy Yankee and Natti Natasha for La Piloto; "Este movimiento" by Like for Like; "Tú eres la razón" by Margarita La Diosa de la Cumbia and Los Fontana for Mi marido tiene familia

=== 2020s ===
Winner	Nominated
38th TVyNovelas Awards
"Rompe" by Paulina Goto for Vencer el miedo	"Así como soy" by Sofía Garza and Viviana Barrera for Cita a ciegas; "Cuna de lobos" by Pedro Plascencia for Cuna de lobos; "Depredador" by Gelo Arango for La reina soy yo; "Tú conmigo" by Yahir for Ringo

== Records ==
- Most awarded singers: Manuel Mijares, Alejandro Sanz and Pablo Alborán, 2 times.
- Singer that won all nominations: Alejandro Sanz and Pablo Alborán, 2 times.
- Most nominated singer: Marco Antonio Solís with 4 nominations.
- Most nominated singers without a win: Laura Pausini and María José with 2 nominations.
- Singer winning after short time: Pablo Alborán by (Tres veces Ana, 2017) and (Caer en tentación, 2018), 2 consecutive years.
- Singer winning after long time: Manuel Mijares by (Corazón salvaje, 1994) and (El Privilegio de Amar, 1999), 5 years difference.
- Foreign winning singers:
  - Ricardo Montaner from Argentina
  - Enrique Iglesias from Spain
  - Juan Luis Guerra from Dominican Republic
  - Alejandro Sanz from Spain
  - Axel from Argentina
  - Pablo Alborán from Spain
