= Terral (album) =

Studio album by Pablo Alborán
- Released: 11 November 2014
- Recorded: 2013–2014; Los Angeles, California
- Length: 70:24
- Language: Spanish
- Label: Warner Music Spain
- Producer: Eric Rosse

Pablo Alborán chronology
Tanto (2012)	Terral (2014)	Tour Terral (Tres Noches en Las Ventas) (2015)

Singles from Terral
- 1. "Por Fin" Released: 16 September 2014; 2. "Pasos de cero" Released: 21 January 2015; 3. "Recuérdame" Released: 31 May 2015; 4. "La Escalera" Released: 28 October 2015

Terral (stylized as TEЯRAL) (English: A Cloud of Dust) is the third studio album by Spanish singer-songwriter Pablo Alborán. It was released on 11 November 2014 through Warner Music. The album was written by Alborán and composed and produced by Eric Rosse. Terral earned a nomination for Best Contemporary Pop Vocal Album at the 16th Latin Grammy Awards and for Best Latin Pop Album at the 58th Annual Grammy Awards.

== Singles ==
- "Por Fin" was released as the album's lead single on 16 September 2014. The song debuted at number 1 on the Spanish Singles Chart. It has so far spent two consecutive weeks at number one.
- "Pasos de cero" was the second single released as a pre-order single on 7 October 2014. On 21 January 2015 the song was officially released as the second single, with the music video for the song premiering the same day.
- "Recuérdame" was released on 31 May 2015 as the third official single, along with the music video for the song.
- "La Escalera" was released on 28 October 2015 as the fourth and final single, along with the music video.

== Track listing ==
Terral - Standard edition
No.	Title	Writer(s)	Producer(s)	Length
1.	"Por Fin"	Pablo Alborán	Eric Rosse	4:01
2.	"La Escalera"			3:57
3.	"Ecos"			4:22
4.	"Pasos de cero"	Alborán		3:54
5.	"Está Permitido"			3:44
6.	"Recuérdame"			4:47
7.	"Ahogándome en Tu Adiós"			4:12
8.	"Volvería"			4:22
9.	"Un Buen Amor"			4:17
10.	"Vívela"			3:11
11.	"Gracias"			4:24
12.	"Quimera" (featuring Ricky Martin)			4:20
13.	"Despídete"			3:48
14.	"El Olvido"			4:49
15.	"La Escalera" (acoustic)			3:56
16.	"Por Fin" (acoustic)			4:00
17.	"Quimera"			4:20

Terral – French edition

All tracks are written by Pablo Alborán.

No.	Title	Length
1.	"Inséparables" (feat. Zaz)	3:49
2.	"Ne m'oublie pas"	4:52
3.	"Por Fin"	4:10
4.	"La Escalera"	3:57
5.	"Está permitido"	3:44
6.	"Ecos"	4:21
7.	"Volvería"	4:21
8.	"Un buen amor"	4:17
9.	"Vívela"	3:11
10.	"Gracias"	4:24
11.	"Quimera" (with Ricky Martin)	4:20
12.	"En extase"	3:26

== Charts ==
=== Weekly charts ===
Weekly chart performance for Terral
Chart (2014–16)	Peak position
Belgian Albums (Ultratop Wallonia)	193
Portuguese Albums (AFP)	2
Spanish Albums (PROMUSICAE)	1
US Top Latin Albums (Billboard)	2
US Latin Pop Albums (Billboard)	1

=== Year-end charts ===
2014 year-end chart performance for Terral
Chart (2014)	Position
Spanish Albums (PROMUSICAE)	1

2015 year-end chart performance for Terral
Chart (2015)	Position
Spanish Albums (PROMUSICAE)	2

2016 year-end chart performance for Terral
Chart (2016)	Position
Spanish Albums (PROMUSICAE)	26

== Certifications ==
Certifications for Terral
Region	Certification	Certified units/sales
Argentina (CAPIF)	Gold	20,000^{^}
Chile (IFPI Chile)	Gold	
Mexico (AMPROFON)	Gold	30,000^{^}
Portugal (AFP)	Gold	7,500^{^}
Spain (PROMUSICAE)	8× Platinum	320,000^{^}
^{^} Shipments figures based on certification alone.

== Release history ==
Release history for Terral
Region	Date	Edition(s)	Format	Label	Ref(s)
Various	11 November 2014	Standard	CD; digital download	Warner Music Spain	
France	29 January 2016	French	CD; digital download	Warner Music Spain	
