= Toma Ketama! =

Studio album by Ketama
- Released: September 12, 2000
- Genre: Latin pop, flamenco
- Label: Universal Music Latino
- Producer: Ketama, Cachorro López

Ketama chronology
Konfusión (1998)	Toma Ketama! (2000)	Karma (2004)

Toma Ketama! is a studio album released by Spanish band Ketama on September 12, 2000. The album was produced by Cachorro López and earned the band a Latin Grammy Award nomination for Best Pop Vocal Album.

== Track listing ==
This information adapted from Allmusic.

No.	Title	Writer(s)	Length
1.	"Así Me Siento"	Ketama	4:39
2.	"K' Cha Cha"	Ketama, Losada, Ruiz	3:52
3.	"Miénteme"	Ketama	4:29
4.	"Tan Lejos"	Ketama	3:27
5.	"Paren el Mundo"	Ketama, Jorge Drexler	3:41
6.	"El Lago"	J. De la Rosa	3:45
7.	"Ke No"	Ketama & Pavel Urkiza	3:50
8.	"Grito con el Korazón"	Ketama	4:15
9.	"Kanela y Menta"	Ketama	4:11
10.	"Soledad"	Ketama	2:52
11.	"Agustito"	Ketama	4:13
12.	"Agustito (Ketama Goes to Miami Remix)"	Ketama	5:02

== Certifications ==
Region	Certification	Certified units/sales
Spain (Promusicae)	2× Platinum	200,000^{^}
^{^} Shipments figures based on certification alone.
