= Saturno (song) =

Single by Pablo Alborán

from the album Prometo
- Released: 8 September 2017
- Length: 4:13
- Label: Warner Music Spain
- Songwriter(s): Pablo Alborán
- Producer(s): Julio Reyes Copello

Pablo Alborán singles chronology
"Dónde está el Amor" (2016)	"Saturno" (2017)	"No Vaya a Ser" (2017)

"Saturno" is a song recorded by Spanish singer-songwriter Pablo Alborán for his fourth studio album Prometo (2017). The song was released worldwide on 8 September 2017, by Warner Music Spain as the album's first single. The song is the main theme of the Mexican telenovela Caer en tentación.

== Charts ==
Chart (2017)	Peak position
Spain (PROMUSICAE)	16

== Certifications ==
Region	Certification	Certified units/sales
Spain (PROMUSICAE)	3× Platinum	180,000^{‡}
United States (RIAA)	3× Platinum (Latin)	180,000^{‡}
Streaming
Chile (PROFOVI)	Gold	12,000,000
^{‡} Sales+streaming figures based on certification alone.

== Awards and nominations ==
Year	Award	Category	Result
2018	36th TVyNovelas Awards	Best Musical Theme	Won
