= Tanto (Pablo Alborán album) =

Studio album by Pablo Alborán
- Released: 6 November 2012
- Length: 43:55
- Language: Spanish
- Label: Warner Spain
- Producer: Manuel Illán

Pablo Alborán chronology
| En Acústico (2011) | Tanto (2012) | Terral (2014) |

Singles from Tanto
- 1. "Tanto" Released: 9 September 2012; 2. "El Beso" Released: December 2012; 3. "Quién" Released: April 2013; 4. "Éxtasis" Released: 27 August 2013; 5. "Dónde está el Amor" Released: September 2013

Tanto (transl. So Much) is the second studio album by Spanish singer-songwriter Pablo Alborán. It was released on 6 November 2012 by Warner Music Spain. It is the follow up to Alborán's debut album Pablo Alborán (2011).

The album peaked at number one in Spain and Portugal. Tanto was re-released in November 2013 and features new tracks and a 30-minute documentary DVD.

== Track listing ==
All tracks are written by Pablo Alborán.

| No. | Title | Length |
|---|---|---|
| 1. | "El Beso" | 4:19 |
| 2. | "Dónde está el Amor" | 3:43 |
| 3. | "Yo No Lo Sabía" | 3:57 |
| 4. | "Deshidratándome" | 4:04 |
| 5. | "Toda la Noche" | 3:02 |
| 6. | "Seré" | 4:11 |
| 7. | "Tanto" | 4:16 |
| 8. | "Quién" | 4:06 |
| 9. | "En Brazos de Ella" | 3:54 |
| 10. | "Éxtasis" | 3:56 |
| 11. | "Me Iré" | 4:07 |

Deluxe edition bonus tracks
| No. | Title | Length |
|---|---|---|
| 12. | "El Beso (Versión acústico)" | 3:46 |
| 13. | "Quién (Versión acústico)" | 3:46 |
| 14. | "Dónde está el Amor featuring Jesse and Joy" | 3:43 |
| 15. | "Éxtasis (Versión Radio)" | 3:57 |
| 16. | "Quién (Versión Ambiental)" | 3:46 |
| 17. | "Tanto (Acústico)" | 4:19 |
| 18. | "La Vie en Rose (French version)" | 3:51 |

== Charts ==
=== Weekly charts ===
Weekly chart performance for Tanto
| Chart (2012–14) | Peak position |
|---|---|
| Portuguese Albums (AFP) | 1 |
| Spanish Albums (PROMUSICAE) | 1 |
| US Top Latin Albums (Billboard) | 41 |
| US Latin Pop Albums (Billboard) | 11 |

=== Year-end charts ===
2012 year-end chart performance for Tanto
| Chart (2012) | Position |
|---|---|
| Spanish Albums (PROMUSICAE) | 1 |

2013 year-end chart performance for Tanto
| Chart (2013) | Position |
|---|---|
| Spanish Albums (PROMUSICAE) | 1 |

2014 year-end chart performance for Tanto
| Chart (2014) | Position |
|---|---|
| Spanish Albums (PROMUSICAE) | 10 |

== Certifications ==
Certifications for Tanto
| Region | Certification | Certified units/sales |
|---|---|---|
| Portugal (AFP) | Platinum | 15,000^{^} |
| Spain (PROMUSICAE) | 10× Platinum | 400,000^{^} |
^{^} Shipments figures based on certification alone.

== Release history ==
Release history for Tanto
| Region | Date | Format | Label | Ref(s) |
|---|---|---|---|---|
| Spain | 6 November 2012 | CD; digital download | EMI Music Spain | |
