= Ketama (band) =

Spanish musical group

- Origin: Madrid, Spain
- Genres: New flamenco
- Years active: 1984–2004
- Labels: Nuevos Medios; Polygram; Universal; Mercury
- Past members: Ray Heredia; José Soto; Juan Carmona; Antonio Carmona; José Miguel Carmona

Ketama is a Spanish musical group in the new flamenco tradition. Fusing flamenco with other musical forms (salsa, Brazilian music, reggae, funk, jazz), they created a style that lies somewhere between flamenco and pop salsa. Their music drew as much criticism as praise because purists did not like the change from traditional flamenco, but the group won over the young public. They continued to fuse other music in, and their 2002 album, Dame la Mano, added hip hop and house music.

== History ==
=== Band formation ===
Ketama formed in Madrid in the early eighties, taking its name from a well-known valley in Morocco. The initial line-up featured José Soto Sorderita (guitar), Juan Carmona (guitar) and Ray Heredia (vocals). Each of the three came from flamenco dynasties: the Heredias of Madrid, the Habichuelas of Granada and the Carmonas of Jerez.

Heredia left the band shortly afterwards, and was eventually replaced by Antonio Carmona (lead singer) and José Miguel Carmona (guitar). The trio briefly became a quartet, but this was only for a short time, as José Soto Sorderita would leave Ketama a few records later.

The group played salsero pop. However they added to their sound, and without ever leaving flamenco behind they incorporated a number of different musical genres into their music, mainly those arising from black roots, such as blues, jazz or the African kora, as well as funk, reggae and Brazilian music.

Their first work, Ketama, was released in 1985, although it was recorded two years earlier.

In 1987, La Pipa de Kif was released. The solo singing was still José Soto's responsibility, but in this record Antonio Carmona started to play a bigger role. It is one of the works by Ketama that drew most acknowledgement and served to launch them at an international level. The record was mentioned in newspapers like The Times and the International Herald Tribune, and in 1989 it came away with prizes for the best world music albums from prestigious international music magazines like New Musical Express and Folk Roots.

=== 1990s ===
"El arte de lo invisible" (1993) leaves fusion temporarily aside and recovers a more traditional sound. Thus, Ketama came to make the live record to which it owes the fame that it attained in Spain.

La Pipa de Kif had a sequel in 1994, "Songhai 2".

They earned international recognition with their third record, Songhai, a fusion of flamenco with Danny Thompson and Toumani Diabaté's African kora, which was praised in reviews in The Times and The International Herald Tribune. Nonetheless, their ultimate success was "De akí a Ketama", which was recorded live with the participation, among others, of Antonio Flores and Antonio Vega. It sold over a million copies, it spent a year in the Spanish hit parade, and won the Ondas award for Best Album (1995), Best Spanish Group (1996) and the Premio de la Música in the Best Song category in 1996 with the song "No estamos lokos". In the same year they contributed to the film Alma Gitana with two songs.

"De akí a Ketama" (1995) represented a big push in terms of their economy and sales. Numerous artists participated, like El Potito, Chonchi Heredia, Antonio Vega, Antonio Flores and Juañares.

After "De akí a Ketama", the band tried to break away from their last record. It was conscious of the fact that it would be difficult to repeat such a big success but, at the same time, it did not want to be repetitive. The end product was "Konfusión" (1997), which achieved some good sales figures as well, without relinquishing their quality or the Ketama imprint. In 1998, the band won the Ondas award for the Best Album again, this time with Konfusión, which sold 300,000 copies.

== The band members ==
Initial line-up was:

- Ray Heredia - vocals
- José Soto - guitar. Also known as "Sorderita"
- Juan Carmona - guitar. Also known as "El Camborio"

Heredia left the band shortly afterwards, and was eventually replaced by Antonio Carmona as lead singer. and José Miguel Carmona joined as guitarist. The trio thus briefly became a quartet, but only for a short while as José Soto Sorderita eventually left.

The members finally settled as the trio:

- Antonio Carmona (born 1965) - Vocals
- Juan Carmona (born 1960, brother of Antonio Carmona). Also known as "El Camborio"
- José Miguel Carmona (born 1971, cousin of Antonio Carmona). Also known as "Josemi"

Ketama disbanded in 2004.

== Their sound ==
Violins, an electric guitar, bass, piano, trumpet, trombone and sax can he heard playing alongside Ketama -which was still a quartet- in "Y es ke me han kambiao los tiempos" (1990). The time has come for the rumba and salsa, both of which are flamencoised in this record.

In these early records, it is already possible to appreciate a review of the legacy of their respective families, although they are still distant from the audacious developments that were to come, not long afterwards. In 1988, "Songhai" was released on the market, and its name was that of the court of the Mandinga empire (Sudan). Here, flamenco was blended with African music, Toumani Diabate's kora to be specific, alongside which African choruses, the guitar playing and voices of Ketama and Danny Thompson's folk-jazz double bass could be heard.

The version of "Vente pa' Madrid" following the rhythm of the kora is indispensable. "Toma Ketama" arrived in 1999, following a compilation record that collected the best themes that they released between 1990 and 1997. "Toma Ketama" sounds more like a flamenco record than "Konfusión", although this does not mean that different influences like pop -which in reality had always been present-, blues or Latin rhythms are absent.

In 2002, Ketama went a step further and blended flamenco with rap, hip-hop and house music in "Dame la mano". This was the last release before their break-up began. Their farewell was accompanied by "20 pa' Ketama" (2004): twenty songs for their followers. With a selection of their best songs and few other new releases and surprises, the band put an end to their twenty-year professional and musical career.

== Cinema ==
In 1995, the band was responsible for the original soundtrack of the film "El efecto mariposa" (The butterfly effect), a Spanish film directed by Fernando Colomo. Their music was also heard in the film "Alma gitana", directed by Chus Gutiérrez and whose protagonist was Amara Carmona.

Ketama also contributed to the AIDS benefit compilation album Onda Sonora: Red Hot + Lisbon (1998) produced by the Red Hot Organization with "Dukeles".

== Discography ==
=== Albums ===
- Ketama (Nuevos Medios, 1985)
- La Pipa de Kif (Nuevos Medios, 1987)
- Songhai (with Toumani Diabaté and Danny Thompson) (Nuevos Medios, 1988)
- Y es ke me han kambiao los tiempos (Philips, 1990)
- Canciones hondas (compilation) (Nuevos Medios, 1992)
- Pa´ gente con Alma (Philips, 1992)
- El Arte de lo invisible (Philips, 1993)
- Songhai 2 (with Toumani Diabaté, José Soto and Danny Thompson) (Nuevos Medios, 1994)
- De akí a Ketama (Mercury, 1995)
- Karma (compilation) (Nuevos Medios, 1996)
- Konfusión (Mercury, 1997)
- Sabor Ketama (Mercury, 1998)
- Toma Ketama! (Mercury, 1999)
- Dame la mano (Mercury, 2002)
- Nuevos Medios Colección (Nuevos Medios, 2002)
- 20 pa' Ketama (Universal, 2004)
- De aki a Ketama Deluxe (Universal, 2019)
