= Te He Echado de Menos =

Single by Pablo Alborán

from the album En Acústico
- Released: 28 February 2012
- Genre: Latin
- Length: 3:51
- Label: EMI Music
- Songwriter(s): Pablo Alborán

Pablo Alborán singles chronology
"Cuestión de Prioridades por el Cuerno de África" (2012)	"Te He Echado de Menos" (2012)	"Tanto" (2012)

Music video
- "Te He Echado de Menos" on YouTube

"Te He Echado de Menos" (Spanish for "I've Missed You") is a song written and performed by Spanish singer Pablo Alborán. It first appeared on his 2011 live album En Acústico, and was later included on revised editions of his albums Pablo Alborán and Tanto.

A studio recording of the song was released as a digital single in February 2012. It peaked at number 2 for three consecutive weeks on Spanish singles chart in May 2012, and remained on the chart for over a year. It went on to become one of the best-selling songs of 2012 in Spain, and one of Alborán's biggest hits.

"Te He Echado de Menos" was awarded the Best Song at the 7th Los Premios 40 Principales, and nominated for the Best Video.

== Music video ==
The music video for the song was filmed in Barcelona, directed by David Casedemunt and Fran Menchón. It pictures Alborán constructing a life-size model of himself, with the intention to send it to his lover whom he has been missing. The videoclip premiered in June 2012.

== Track listing ==
Digital download
No.	Title	Length
1.	"Te He Echado de Menos" (Versión Studio)	3:51

== Chart performance ==
=== Weekly charts ===
Chart (2012)	Peak position
Spain (PROMUSICAE)	2

=== Year-end charts ===
Chart (2012)	Peak position
Spain (PROMUSICAE)	4

Chart (2013)	Peak position
Spain (PROMUSICAE)	45

== Certifications ==
Certifications for "Te He Echado de Menos" (Radio Edit)
Region	Certification	Certified units/sales
Spain (PROMUSICAE)	Gold	20,000^{‡}
^{‡} Sales+streaming figures based on certification alone.

== Release history ==
Region	Date	Format	Label
Spain	28 February 2012	Digital download	EMI Music
