= Dónde está el Amor (Pablo Alborán song) =

2013 song by Pablo Alborán

Single by Pablo Alborán featuring Jesse & Joy

from the album Tanto
- Released: 30 September 2013
- Length: 3:37
- Label: Warner Music Spain
- Songwriter: Pablo Alborán

Pablo Alborán singles chronology
"Éxtasis" (2013)	"Dónde está el Amor" (2013)	"Por Fin" (2014)

Jesse & Joy singles chronology
"La de la Mala Suerte" (2013)	"Dónde está el Amor" (2013)	"Ecos de Amor" (2015)

"Dónde está el Amor" (English: Where is the Love) is a song recorded by Spanish singer-songwriter Pablo Alborán. The song is included on his second studio album, Tanto (2012).

It was re-recorded featuring Mexican pop duo Jesse & Joy and released as the first single from the re-release of Tanto (2013) in September 2013. It was the second single release by Alborán and Jesse and Joy in 2013, following "La de la Mala Suerte" in June.

In 2014 at the 15th Annual Latin Grammy Awards the song was nominated for Record of the Year.

== Chart performance ==
Chart (2013–14)	Peak position
Spain (PROMUSICAE)	32
US Latin Airplay (Billboard) featuring Jesse & Joy	19
US Hot Latin Songs (Billboard) featuring Jesse & Joy	16
US Hot Latin Songs (Billboard) featuring Jesse & Joy	8

== 2016 re-release ==
"Dónde está el Amor"

Single by Pablo Alborán featuring Tiê

from the album Haja Coração
- Released: 12 August 2016
- Length: 3:50
- Label: Warner Music Spain
- Songwriter: Pablo Alborán

Pablo Alborán singles chronology
"Se Puede Amar" (2016)	"Dónde está el Amor" (2016)	"Saturno" (2017)

Alborán recorded a new version of the song featuring Brazilian singer-songwriter Tiê. It was released in August 2016 and taken from the soundtrack to the telenovela Haja Coração.

== Chart performance ==
Chart (2016)	Peak position
Spain (PROMUSICAE)	24

== Certifications ==
Region	Certification	Certified units/sales
Mexico (AMPROFON)	Gold	30,000^{*}
Spain (Promusicae)	2× Platinum	200,000^{‡}
United States (RIAA)	3× Platinum (Latin)	180,000^{‡}
^{*} Sales figures based on certification alone.^{‡} Sales+streaming figures based on certification alone.
