= Palmeras en la nieve (song) =

2015 song performed by Pablo Alborán

Single by Pablo Alborán

from the album Palmeras En La Nieve
- Released: 11 December 2015
- Length: 3:37
- Label: Warner Music Spain
- Songwriter(s): Lucas Vidal and Pablo Alborán

Pablo Alborán singles chronology
| "La Escalera" (2015) | "Palmeras en la nieve" (2015) | "Se Puede Amar" (2016) |

Music video
- "Palmeras en la nieve" on YouTube

"Palmeras en la nieve" (English: "Palm Trees in the Snow") is a song recorded by Spanish singer-songwriter Pablo Alborán for the soundtrack to the Spanish romantic drama film Palmeras En La Nieve. The song was released worldwide on 11 December 2015 and peaked at number 23 in Spain in February 2016.

At the 30th Goya Awards the song was awarded the Goya Award for Best Original Song.

== Chart performance ==
| Chart (2015–16) | Peak position |
|---|---|
| Spain (PROMUSICAE) | 23 |
