= La Cuarta Hoja =

Studio album by Pablo Alborán
- Released: 2 December 2022
- Length: 38:45
- Language: Spanish
- Label: Warner Spain

Pablo Alborán chronology
Vértigo (2020)	La Cuarta Hoja (2022)	KM0 (2025)

Singles from La Cuarta Hoja
- 1. "Llueve Sobre Mojado" Released: October 14, 2021; 2. "Soy Capaz" Released: November 12, 2021; 3. "Castillos de Arena" Released: January 13, 2022; 4. "Carretera y Manta" Released: July 14, 2022; 5. "Viaje a Ningún Lado" Released: October 13, 2022; 6. "Amigos" Released: November 9, 2022; 7. "Ave de Paso" Released: November 29, 2022; 8. "4U" Released: May 25, 2023

La Cuarta Hoja (transl. The Fourth Leaf) is the sixth studio album by Spanish singer-songwriter Pablo Alborán. It was released by Warner Music Spain on 2 December 2022.

== Chart performance ==
La Cuarta Hoja became Alborán's sixth consecutive studio album to top the Spanish Albums Chart. It has since been certified platinum by the Productores de Música de España (Promusicae).

== Track listing ==
La Cuarta Hoja track listing
No.	Title	Writer(s)	Producers(s)	Length
1.	"Carretera y Manta"	Pablo Alborán	Alborán	2:40
2.	"Amigos" (featuring Maria Becerra)	Alborán; Becerra	Paco Salazar	3:51
3.	"Voraces"	Alborán	Alborán	3:08
4.	"Viaje A Ningún Lado" (featuring Carin León)	Alborán	Alborán; Salazar; Orlando Aispuro Meneses	3:48
5.	"El Traje"	Alborán	Alborán	3:13
6.	"A Batir Alas"	Alborán	Alborán	3:43
7.	"Aves de Paso" (featuring Ana Mena)	Alborán	Alborán; Josh Tampico	3:36
8.	"4U" (featuring Leo Rizzi)	Alborán; Rizzi	Salazar	3:08
9.	"Soy Capaz"	Alborán	Salazar	3:20
10.	"Castillos de Arena"	Alborán	Alborán; Salazar	4:07
11.	"Llueve Sobre Mojado" (featuring Aitana & Álvaro de Luna)	Alborán; Aitana Ocaña Morales; de Luna	Julio Reyes; Salazar	3:46

== Charts ==
=== Weekly charts ===
Weekly chart performance for La Cuarta Hoja
Chart (2022)	Peak position
Portuguese Albums (AFP)	37
Spanish Albums (Promusicae)	1

=== Year-end charts ===
2022 year-end chart performance for La Cuarta Hoja
Chart (2022)	Position
Spanish Albums (PROMUSICAE)	16

2023 year-end chart performance for La Cuarta Hoja
Chart (2023)	Position
Spanish Albums (PROMUSICAE)	34

== Certifications ==
Certifications for La Cuarta Hoja
Region	Certification	Certified units/sales
Spain (Promusicae)	Platinum	40,000^{‡}
^{‡} Sales+streaming figures based on certification alone.

== Release history ==
Release history for La Cuarta Hoja
Region	Date	Format	Label	Ref(s)
Various	2 December 2022	CD; digital download; streaming; vinyl	Warner Spain	
