= Vívela =

Single by Pablo Alborán

from the album Tour Terral (Tres Noches en Las Ventas)
- Released: 5 October 2015
- Recorded: Madrid, June 2015
- Length: 5:37
- Label: EMI Music
- Songwriter(s): Pablo Alborán
- Producer(s): Eric Rosse

Pablo Alborán singles chronology
"Inséparables" (2015)	"Vívela" (2015)	"La Escalera" (2015)

"Vívela" (English: "Live it") is a song recorded by the Spanish singer-songwriter Pablo Alborán. The song was included on his third studio album, Terral. The song was released as the lead single from his second live album Tour Terral (Tres Noches en Las Ventas) (2015). It was released as a digital download and CD single and peaked at number 1 on the Spanish Singles Chart in October 2015.

== Track listing ==
Digital download
No.	Title	Length
1.	"Vívela" (live)	5:37

CD single
No.	Title	Length
1.	"Vívela" (live)	5:37
2.	"La Escalera" (live)	5:08
3.	"Gracias" (live)	5:03
4.	"Vívela" (studio version)	3:11
5.	"Vívela" (acoustic)

== Chart performance ==
=== Weekly charts ===
Chart (2015)	Peak position
Spain (PROMUSICAE)	1

== Release history ==
Region	Date	Format	Label
Spain	5 October 2015	Digital download, CD	EMI Music

== See also ==
- List of number-one singles of 2015 (Spain)
