= Tanto (song) =

Single by Pablo Alborán

from the album Tanto
- Released: 9 September 2012
- Recorded: 2012
- Genre: Pop
- Length: 4:16
- Label: EMI Music
- Songwriter: Pablo Alborán

Pablo Alborán singles chronology
"Te He Echado de Menos" (2012)	"Tanto" (2012)	"Vuelvo a verte" (2012)

Music video
- "Tanto" on YouTube

"Tanto" (English: "So Much") is a song recorded by the Spanish singer-songwriter Pablo Alborán. The single served as the first single from his second studio album Tanto (2012). It was released on 9 September 2012 as a digital download in Spain. The single peaked at number 2 on the Spanish Singles Chart.

Alborán put a fans' version of this music on his VEVO channel on YouTube before releasing the music video. In the fans' version he invited eight of his fans from Spain to sing this music while he's playing guitar next to them.

== Track listing ==
Digital download
No.	Title	Length
1.	"Tanto"	4:16

== Chart performance ==
Chart (2012)	Peak position
Spain (PROMUSICAE)	2
US Hot Latin Songs (Billboard)	49
US Latin Pop Airplay (Billboard)	29
Venezuela Top 100 (Record Report)	71

End Of Year (2012)	Peak position
Spain (PROMUSICAE)	15

End Of Year (2013)	Peak position
Spain (PROMUSICAE)	27

Region	Certification
Spain (PROMUSICAE)	Platinum

== Release history ==
Region	Date	Format	Label
Spain	9 September 2012	Digital download	EMI Music
