= Éxtasis (song) =

Single by Pablo Alborán

from the album Tanto
- Released: 27 August 2013
- Recorded: 2012
- Genre: Pop
- Length: 3:58 (radio edit)
- Label: Warner Music Spain
- Songwriter(s): Pablo Alborán
- Producer(s): Manuel Illán

Pablo Alborán singles chronology
"La de la Mala Suerte" (2013)	"Éxtasis" (2013)	"Dónde está el Amor" (2013)

Music video
- "Éxtasis" on YouTube

"Éxtasis" (English: "Ecstasy") is a song recorded by the Spanish singer-songwriter Pablo Alborán. The song was released as the fourth single from his second studio album Tanto (2012). It was released in 27 August 2013 as a digital download in Spain. The single peaked at number 16 on the Spanish Singles Chart in December 2013.

== Music video ==
The official music video for "Éxtasis" was released on 26 August 2013.

== Track listing ==
Digital download
No.	Title	Length
1.	"Éxtasis"	3:58

== Chart performance ==
"Éxtasis" debuted at number 25 on the Spanish singles chart for the week commencing 1 September 2013, before reaching number 16 in December 2013.

=== Weekly charts ===
Chart (2013)	Peak position
Spain (PROMUSICAE)	16

== Release history ==
Region	Date	Format	Label
Spain	27 August 2013	Digital download	EMI Music
