= Tiê =

Brazilian singer-songwriter

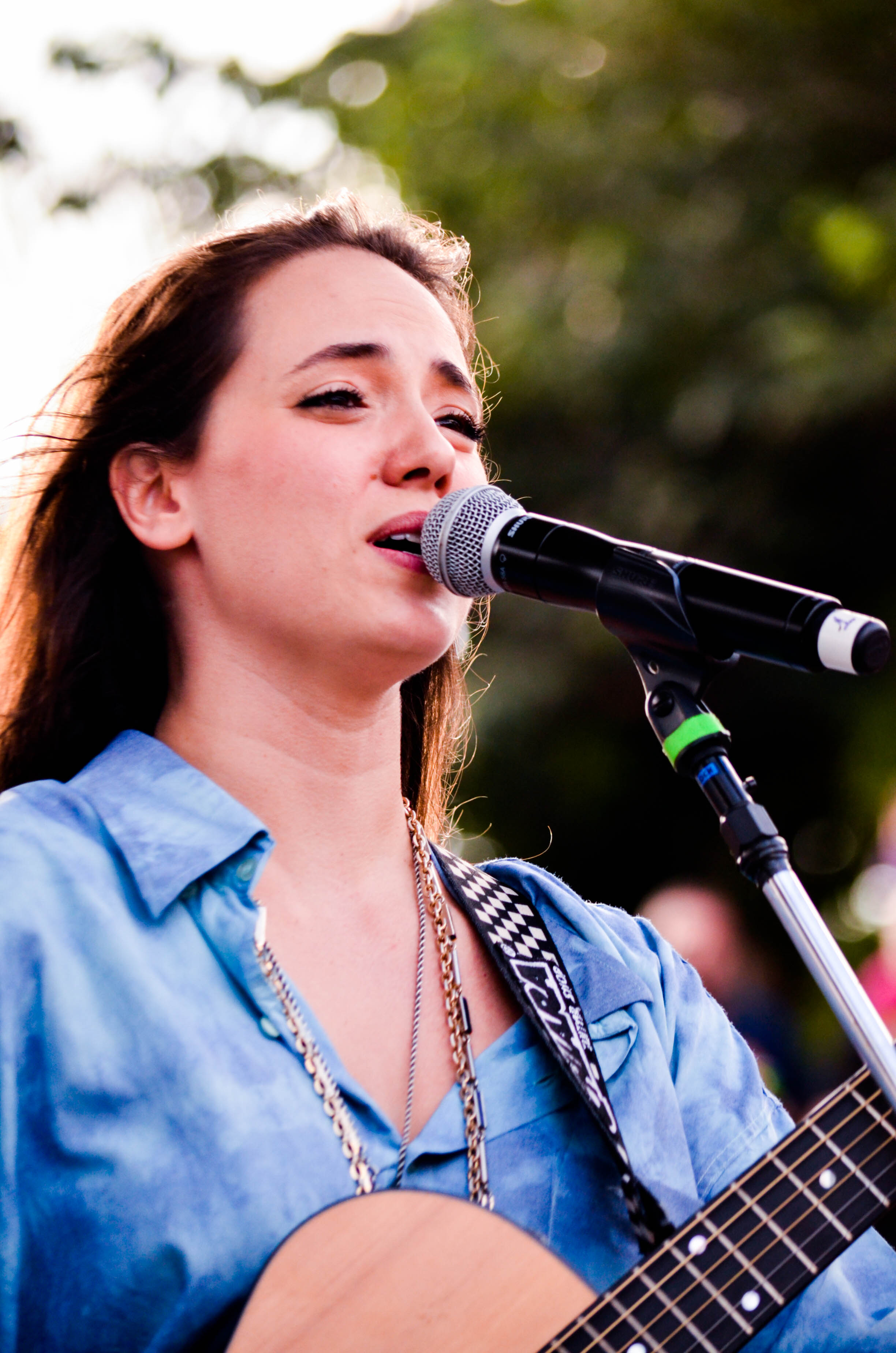
- Tiê in concert (2015)
- Born: Tiê Gasparinetti Biral; March 17, 1980 (age 46); São Paulo, Brazil
- Occupation: Singer-songwriter
- Years active: 2007–present
- Musical career
- Genres: MPB; indie pop
- Occupations: Singer; songwriter
- Label: Warner Music Brasil

Tiê Gasparinetti Biral, simply known as Tiê (born March 17, 1980, in São Paulo), is a Brazilian singer-songwriter.

== Life and career ==
The granddaughter of the actress Vida Alves, Tiê approached music in her high school years, when she founded a band and won an award in a student music competition in 1997. The turning point came when she was noticed by singer Toquinho while performing at Café Brechó, a bar-restaurant next to the MTV studios where he was recording an album.

After having joined Toquinho on tour for two years, Tiê began to prepare her own repertoire, composing her own songs and learning to play the guitar. After releasing an EP in 2007 in collaboration with musician Dudu Tsuda, she made her solo recording debut in 2009, with the album Sweet Jardim. For this album Tiê was nominated in the MPB category at the MTV Video Music Brasil. Her second album, A Coruja e o Coração, which features collaborations with Jorge Drexler, Marcelo Jeneci, Tulipa Ruiz and Dorgival Dantas, was included in the list of 50 albums that formed the Brazilian musical identity of the new millennium published by Folha de S. Paulo.

Several of her songs were used as theme songs for telenovelas, notably "A Noite", a cover version of Arisa's "La notte", which was picked as the theme song of I Love Paraisópolis.

== Discography ==
=== Studio albums ===
- 2007 – E.P. 1 (EP)
- 2009 – Sweet Jardim
- 2011 – A Coruja e o Coração
- 2014 – Esmeraldas
- 2017 – Gaya
- 2020 – Kudra (EP)
- 2026 – Esgotada

=== Live albums ===
- 2019 – Dix
