= La Escalera (song) =

Single by Pablo Alborán

from the album Terral
- Released: 28 October 2015
- Length: 3:59
- Label: Warner Music
- Songwriter(s): Pablo Alborán
- Producer(s): Eric Rosse

Pablo Alborán singles chronology
"Vívela" (2015)	"La Escalera" (2015)	"Palmeras en la nieve" (2015)

Music video
- "La Escalera" on YouTube

"La Escalera" (English: "The Stairs") is a song recorded by Spanish singer-songwriter Pablo Alborán. It was released as the fourth and final single from his third studio album, Terral on 28 October 2015.

== Music video ==
The music video for "La Escalera" was released on the same day. It stars Spanish actors Berta Herández and Adridane Ramirez and four figures of the Spanish National Ballet (Luciana Croatto, Kayoko Everahrt, Reyes ortega and Sara Fernandez Gómez).

== Chart performance ==
Chart (2014)	Peak position
Spain (PROMUSICAE)	27

== Release history ==
Region	Date	Format	Label
Worldwide	28 October 2015	Digital download	Warner Music Spain
