= Camila Luna =

Puerto Rican singer-songwriter

- Born: 1993 (age 31–32)
- Origin: San Juan, Puerto Rico
- Genres: Alternative pop, latin
- Years active: 2013–present
- Labels: Independent
- Website: camilaluna.com

Camila Luna (born 1993) is a Puerto Rican Latin alternative-pop singer-songwriter who was nominated for a Latin Grammy for Best Pop/Rock Album in 2015 for her first album Flamboyán. She was nominated for a Latin Grammy for Best Vocal Pop Contemporary Album in 2017 for her second album Flora y Fauna.

== Biography ==
=== Background ===
Camila Luna (born Camila Barbeito) began her life in San Juan, Puerto Rico, and moved to Miami, Florida, at the age of 3. She is a student and teaching assistant at University of Miami's Master in Fine Arts program at the Miami College of Arts & Sciences.

According to People en Español, Luna wrote her first poem, "The Snowflake", at the age of five, which was published in a children's poetry magazine. She credits her uncle for teaching her how to play the guitar aged 15. Her first two albums, Flamboyán (2014) and Flora y Fauna (2017), both earned nominations from the Latin Grammys. Without a budget, she filmed the music video for Flamboyán on her iPhone, in her grandmother's backyard, in Puerto Rico. The single Siento, from Flora y Fauna, had 3.2 million spins on Spotify as of October 4, 2017.

== Discography ==
=== Albums ===
- Flamboyán (2014)
- Flora y Fauna (2017)

=== Singles ===
- "Mi Soledad y Yo" (2014)
- "Flamboyán" (2014)
- "Siento" (2016)

== Awards and Recognitions ==
Camila Luna was nominated for a Latin Grammy in 2015 for Best Pop/Rock Album of the Year for her first album Flamboyán.

She was also nominated for a Latin Grammy in 2017 for Best Vocal Pop Contemporary Album of the Year for her second album Flora y Fauna.
