= Pablo Alborán =

Spanish musician, singer and songwriter

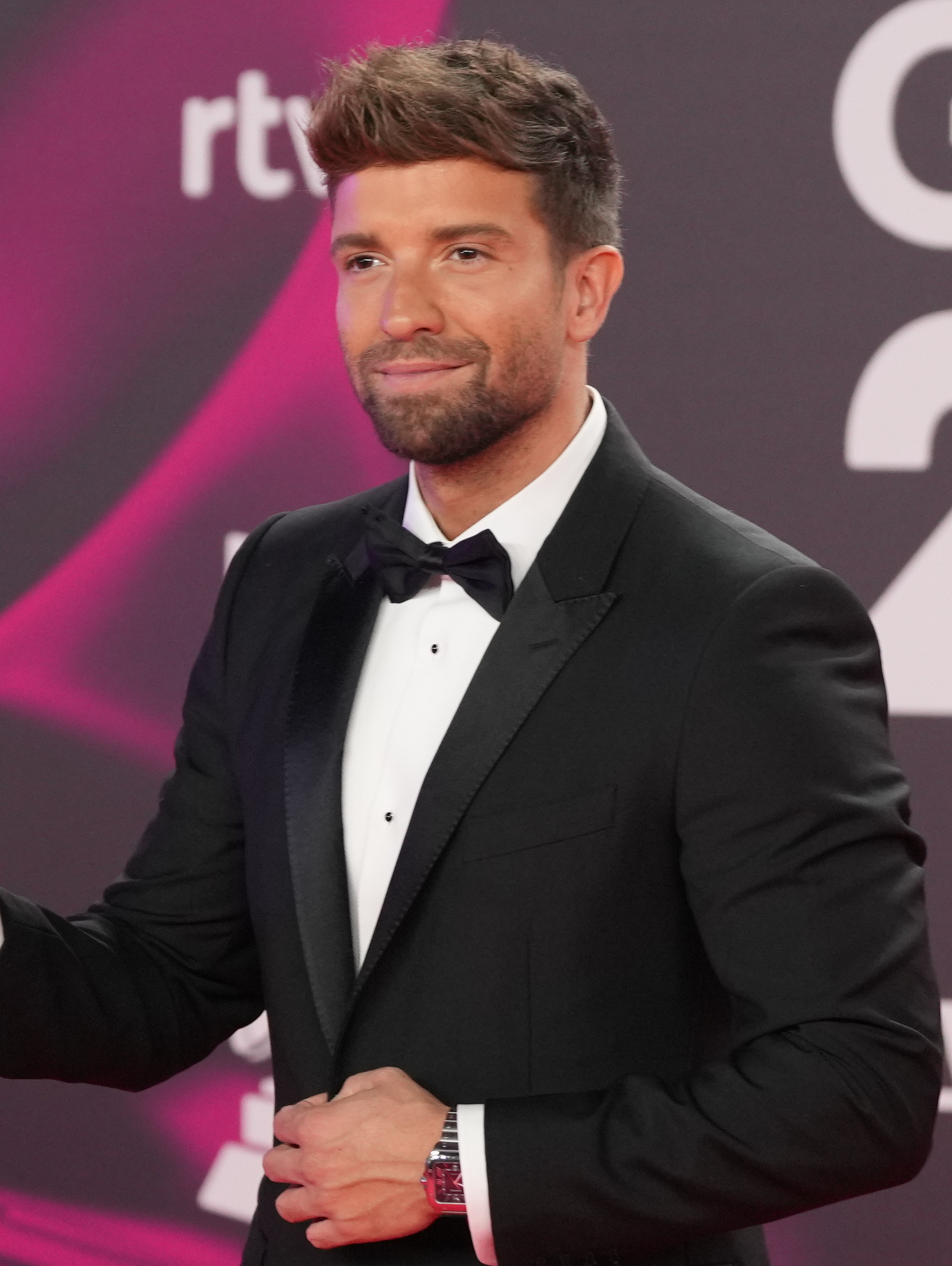
- Alborán in 2023
- Born: Pablo Moreno de Alborán Ferrándiz; 31 May 1989 (age 37); Málaga, Andalusia, Spain
- Occupations: Musician; singer; songwriter
- Years active: 2010–present
- Musical career
- Genres: Latin pop; pop; flamenco; pop rock
- Instruments: Vocals; guitar; piano
- Labels: EMI Spain (2010–2012); Warner Spain (2013–present)
- Website: pabloalboran.es

Pablo Moreno de Alborán Ferrándiz (born 31 May 1989), popularly known as Pablo Alborán, is a Spanish musician, singer-songwriter and actor. Throughout his career, Alborán has released seven studio albums. He released "Solamente Tú", the lead single from his 2011 self-titled debut album. The track topped the charts in his home country for two consecutive weeks. The album debuted at number one, making Alborán the first solo artist to have their debut album to debut atop since 1998 in Spain. Alborán was nominated for Best New Artist at the 12th Latin Grammy Awards. As of 2025, he has sold more than 4 million albums worldwide.

Alborán's second record Tanto (2012) spawned the number one singles "Quién" and "El Beso". It received a Latin Grammy Award nomination for Album of the Year. His third studio album Terral (2014) spawned the chart-topping singles "Por Fin" and "Pasos de Cero" and received a Grammy Award nomination for Best Latin Pop Album. Alborán embarked on a huge concert tour Tour Terral, which visited Europe, North, and South America. Its respective live album Tres Noches en Las Ventas marked Alborán's second Album of the Year nomination. In 2017, Alborán released his fourth studio album Prometo to critical and commercial success. It spawned the singles "Saturno" and "No Vaya a Ser", among others. He released his fifth album Vértigo in 2020, followed by his sixth album La Cuarta Hoja in 2022. His seventh album, KM0 (Kilometro cero), was released in late 2025.

Throughout his career, Alborán has won a Goya Award for Best Original Song, thirteen LOS40 Music Awards, as well as nominations for four Grammy Awards and thirty Latin Grammy Awards.

== Music career ==
From a very young age, Alborán was interested in learning to play various musical instruments such as piano, classical guitar, flamenco guitar, and acoustic guitar, and attended singing lessons with professional artists in Málaga and Madrid. In 2002, at the age of 12, he composed his first songs, "Amor de Barrio" (Neighbourhood Love) and "Desencuentro" (Disagreement) which would be featured 10 years later on his debut album. In Málaga he performed for the first time with a Flamenco band in a restaurant, and he was nicknamed El Blanco Moreno (The White Moreno), because he "was very pale-skinned and Moreno was my family name", as he stated in an interview in early 2011. Later, Pablo met producer Manuel Illán and recorded a demo, which included a cover of "Deja de Volverme Loca" (Stop Driving Me Crazy) by Diana Navarro. Upon hearing this recording, Navarro expressed great interest in Alborán and became his musical mentor.

In preparation for his first album, Alborán composed a total of 40 songs from which the playlist would be selected. During the recording of this studio album, Pablo Alborán, he uploaded a few songs on YouTube, which gained the attention of many, including singer Kelly Rowland who was amazed by his voice, as far as saying "I'm in love with Pablo Alboran!". His videos have since received millions of views.

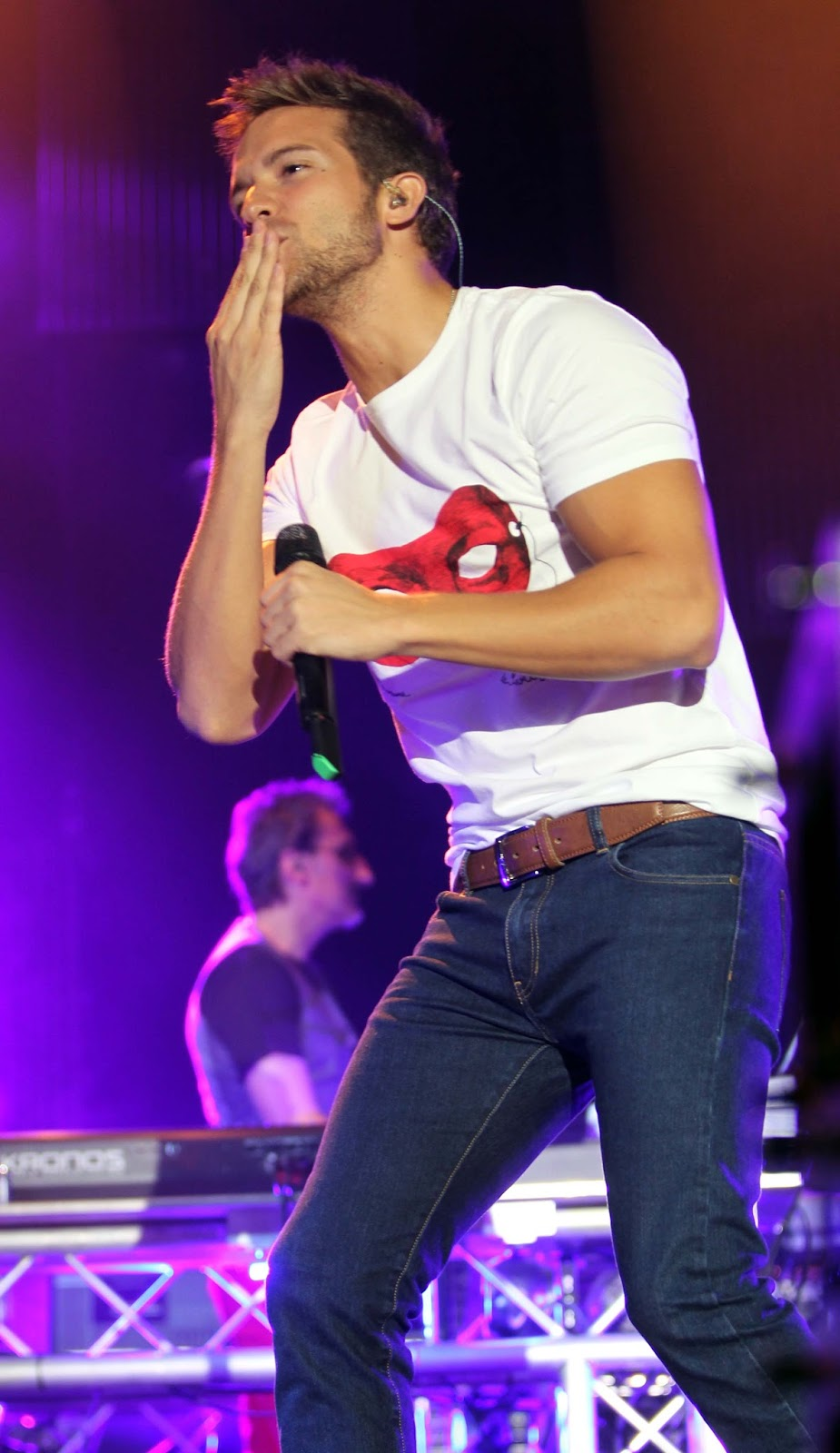
Alborán in 2016

"Solamente Tú" (Only You) was digitally released in Spain in October 2010 as the first single of his debut album, which was released in February 2011. Both the single and the album were a huge success, managing to top the Spanish music charts for several consecutive weeks. The album won multiple awards, including RTVE's Album of the Year for 2011, and became Spain's best-selling album of that year.

Alborán began his first world tour on 27 May 2011 in Madrid at the Palacio Vistalegre, and has since performed in many Latin American countries, among which are Argentina, Chile and Mexico. Following his success, he released his first live album, En Acústico, in November of the same year. It included acoustic versions of most of the tracks in his debut album, as well as two new songs and four bonus tracks. The song "Perdóname" (Forgive Me) was re-recorded featuring Portuguese singer Carminho, and was released as the first single of the album, peaking at number one on the Spanish singles chart on 13 November 2011, thus helping En Acústico to debut also at number one on the albums chart one week later, on 20 November 2011, and to top the Portuguese Albums Chart in January 2012.

On 19 December 2011, Alborán received the 2011 Best New Act award in Los Premios 40 Principales. Both his albums Pablo Alborán and En Acústico were featured in Spain's official list of top-selling albums of 2011, at number 1 and number 6, respectively, and singles "Solamente Tú" and "Perdóname" were the respective third and nineteenth best-selling songs in Spain in 2011.

In January 2012, Alborán collaborated on the charity single, "Cuestión de Prioridades por el Cuerno de África" (A matter of priorities for the horn of Africa).

In September 2012, Alborán released the lead single "Tanto" from his forthcoming album Tanto which was released in November 2012. The album was certified 10× Platinum in Spain and was the highest selling album in Spain in 2012 and 2013. The album included two number one singles in Spain, "El Beso" (The Kiss) and "Quién" (Who). The album received Latin Grammy Awards.

Alborán released his third studio album Terral in November 2014. The album became his fourth straight number 1 album in Spain and has been certified 8× Platinum. It was the highest selling album in Spain in 2014.

In April 2016, "Se Puede Amar" was released, which is the first single of the forthcoming fourth studio album. Throughout 2016, Alborán toured Central America. In August, Alboran re-released "Dónde está el Amor" with Brazilian singer Tiê. It was included in the telenovela soundtrack Haja Coração.

On 8 September 2017, after a two-year break, Alborán announced on his social networks that he was finishing preparing what would be his fourth studio album, Prometo. He released two singles ("Saturno" and "No Vaya a Ser") on the same day. "Saturno" is a ballad, reminiscent of his beginnings as a singer, while "No Vaya a Ser" is a different style flirting with electronics and African rhythms. Prometo was released on 17 November 2017 and debuted at number 1 in Spain.

Alborán's fifth studio album, Vertigo, was released on 11 December 2020. It debuted at number one on Promusica's top 100 list. It sold 40,000 copies and was certified Platinum. It also debuted in 8th place on Spotify's global charts the week of its release.

His sixth album, La Cuarta Hoja (The Fourth Leaf), was released on December 2, 2022. It debuted at number 1 on Promusica's top 100 list, and was certified Gold. It debuted at 9th place globally and 18th in Spain on Spotify the week of its release. The album includes collaborations with María Becerra, Carín León, Ana Mena, Leo Rizzi, Aitana, and Álvaro de Luna. Singles from the album included "Llueve sobre mojado" ("When it Rains, it Pours") with Aitana and de Luna, which was certified gold; "Soy capaz" ("I am Capable"); "Castillos de arena" ("Sand Castles"), nominated for a Latin Grammy as Recording of the Year; "Carretera y manta" ("Hit the Road"), "Amigos" (with María Becerra), and "Ave de paso" ("Just Passing Through") with Ana Mena.

In 2023, Alborán contributed the single "Somos dos" ("We are Two") to the Spanish soundtrack of the Disney Pixar release Elemental (the version on the English language soundtrack is "Steal the Show" by Lauv).

In 2025, Alborán released five singles in advance of the release of his seventh studio album, KM0 ("Kilometer Zero;" the title refers to starting over after the end of a relationship): "CLICKBAIT"; "KM0"; and "Vámonos de aquí" ("Let's Get Out of Here"), featuring Brazilian harmonica player Indiara Sfaira; "Mis 36" ("My 36;" in reference to his age); and "Qué tal te va" ("How's it Going?") featuring Luan Santana. The album will be released on November 7, 2025.

== Personal life ==
Alborán is the youngest of three children of Spanish architect Salvador Moreno de Alborán Peralta and Elena Ferrándiz Martínez. Ferrándiz Martínez was born in Casablanca to Spanish parents during the French protectorate of Morocco.

In June 2020, Alborán came out as gay in a video posted to his Instagram account. He has said that he does not discuss the intimate details of his personal life with the press: "My intention [in coming out] was very pure: I tell you this like I'm telling you that I drink coffee. If this information is relevant or not, you have to ask who considers it to be relevant. For me, it's not."

As of 2020, Alborán resides in Málaga. He also owns a house in Boadilla del Monte, in the Community of Madrid.

== Discography ==
=== Studio albums ===
| Title | Album details | Peak chart positions | | | | | Certifications |
| Title | Album details | SPA | MEX | POR | US Latin | US Latin Pop | Certifications |
|---|---|---|---|---|---|---|---|
| Pablo Alborán | Released: 28 January 2011; Label: Warner Music Spain; Formats: CD, digital download | 1 | 50 | 6 | 55 | 14 | ASINCOL: Gold; PROMUSICAE: 9× Platinum |
| Tanto | Released: 6 November 2012; Label: Warner Music Spain; Formats: CD, digital download | 1 | — | 1 | 46 | 11 | AFP: Platinum; PROMUSICAE: 10× Platinum |
| Terral | Released: 11 November 2014; Label: Warner Music Spain; Formats: CD, digital download | 1 | — | 2 | 2 | 1 | AFP: Gold; AMPROFON: Gold; CAPIF: Gold; IFPI CHL: Gold; PROMUSICAE: 8× Platinum |
| Prometo | Released: 17 November 2017; Label: Warner Music Spain; Formats: CD, digital download | 1 | — | 2 | 11 | 3 | AMPROFON: Gold; IFPI CHL: Gold; PROMUSICAE: 6× Platinum; RIAA: Gold (Latin) |
| Vértigo | Released: 11 December 2020; Label: Warner Music Spain; Formats: CD, digital download | 1 | — | 19 | — | — | PROMUSICAE: 2xPlatinum |
| La Cuarta Hoja | Released: 2 December 2022; Label: Warner Music Spain; Formats: CD, digital download, streaming, vinyl | 1 | — | 37 | — | — | PROMUSICAE: Platinum |
| KM0 | Released: 7 November 2025; Label: Warner Music Spain; Formats: CD, digital download, streaming, vinyl | 2 | — | — | — | — | PROMUSICAE: Gold |
"—" indicates the album was not released in that country, or was unable to chart there.

=== Live albums ===
| Title | Album details | Peak chart positions | | Certifications |
| Title | Album details | SPA | POR | Certifications |
|---|---|---|---|---|
| En Acústico | Released: 15 November 2011; Label: Warner Music Spain; Formats: CD, digital download | 1 | 1 | PROMUSICAE: 8× Platinum |
| Tour Terral: Tres noches en Las Ventas | Released: 6 November 2015; Label: Warner Music Spain; Formats: CD, digital download | — | 6 | |

=== Singles ===
==== As main artist ====
| Year | Title | Peak chart positions | | | Certifications | Album |
| Year | Title | SPA | US Latin | US Latin Pop Airplay | Certifications | Album |
|---|---|---|---|---|---|---|
| 2010 | "Solamente Tú" | 1 | 35 | 13 | PROMUSICAE: 2× Platinum | Pablo Alborán |
| 2011 | "Miedo" | 40 | — | — | | Pablo Alborán |
| 2011 | "Perdóname" (featuring Carminho) | 1 | — | — | PROMUSICAE: Platinum | En Acústico |
| 2012 | "Te He Echado de Menos" | 2 | — | — | PROMUSICAE: Platinum | En Acústico |
| 2012 | "Tanto" | 2 | 49 | 29 | PROMUSICAE: Platinum | Tanto |
| 2012 | "El Beso" | 1 | — | — | PROMUSICAE: Gold | Tanto |
| 2013 | "Quién" | 1 | — | — | PROMUSICAE: Platinum | Tanto |
| 2013 | "Éxtasis" | 16 | — | — | PROMUSICAE: Gold | Tanto |
| 2013 | "Dónde está el Amor" (featuring Jesse & Joy) | 32 | 16 | 8 | | Tanto |
| 2014 | "Por Fin" | 1 | — | 20 | PROMUSICAE: Platinum | Terral |
| 2015 | "Pasos de cero" | 1 | — | — | PROMUSICAE: Platinum | Terral |
| 2015 | "Recuérdame" | 5 | 34 | 29 | PROMUSICAE: Platinum | Terral |
| 2015 | "Vívela" | 32 | — | — | | Terral |
| 2015 | "La Escalera" | 27 | — | — | PROMUSICAE: Gold | Terral |
| 2015 | "Palmeras en la nieve" | 28 | — | — | | Palm Trees in the Snow (soundtrack) |
| 2016 | "Se Puede Amar" | 6 | — | — | | Non-album single |
| 2016 | "Dónde está el Amor" (featuring Tiê) | 24 | — | — | | Haja Coração (soundtrack) |
| 2017 | "Saturno" | 16 | — | — | PROMUSICAE: 3× Platinum | Prometo |
| 2017 | "No Vaya a Ser" | 9 | — | — | PROMUSICAE: 2× Platinum | Prometo |
| 2018 | "Prometo" | 35 | — | — | PROMUSICAE: Platinum | Prometo |
| 2018 | "La llave" (featuring Piso 21) | 42 | — | — | PROMUSICAE: Platinum | Prometo |
| 2018 | "Tu refugio" | 93 | — | — | PROMUSICAE: Platinum | Prometo |
| 2019 | "Tabú" (with Ava Max) | 13 | — | — | PROMUSICAE: 2× Platinum | Tabú EP |
| 2020 | "Cuando estés aquí" | 69 | — | — | | Non-album singles |
| 2020 | "El mismo aire" (with Camilo) | 28 | — | — | PROMUSICAE: 3× Platinum | Non-album singles |
| 2020 | "Si hubieras querido" | 51 | — | — | PROMUSICAE: Platinum | Vértigo |
| 2020 | "Hablemos de amor" | 89 | — | — | | Vértigo |
| 2021 | "Llueve sobre mojado" (with Aitana and Alvaro De Luna) | 42 | — | — | PROMUSICAE: Platinum | La Cuarta Hoja |
| 2021 | "El Lobby" (with Micro TBH) | — | — | — | | Nueve |
| 2021 | "Soy capaz" | — | — | — | | La Cuarta Hoja |
| 2022 | "Castillos de arena" | 29 | — | — | | La Cuarta Hoja |
| 2022 | "Contigo" (with Sebastián Yatra) | 56 | — | — | | Dharma |
| 2022 | "Carretera y Manta" | 93 | — | — | PROMUSICAE: Platinum | La Cuarta Hoja |
| 2022 | "Amigos" (with María Becerra) | 55 | — | — | PROMUSICAE: Platinum | La Cuarta Hoja |
| 2023 | "Somos dos" | — | — | — | | Elemental soundtrack |
| 2025 | "Clickbait" | 8 | — | — | | KM0 |
| 2025 | "KM0" | 34 | — | — | | KM0 |
| 2025 | "Vámonos de aquí" (with Indiara Sfair) | 16 | — | — | | KM0 |
| 2025 | "Mis 36" | — | — | — | | KM0 |
| 2025 | "¿Qué tal te va?" (with Luan Santana) | — | — | — | | KM0 |
"—" denotes a recording that did not chart or was not released in that territory

==== As featured artist ====
| Year | Title | Peak chart positions | Album |
| Year | Title | SPA | Album |
|---|---|---|---|
| 2012 | "Cuestión de Príoridades por el Cuerno de África" (Melendi feat. Dani Martín, Pablo Alborán, La Dama, Rasel, Malú & Carlos Baute) | 36 | |
| 2012 | "Vuelvo a verte" (Malú feat. Pablo Alborán) | 1 | Dual |
| 2013 | "La de la Mala Suerte" (Jesse & Joy feat. Pablo Alborán) | 17 | ¿Con Quién Se Queda El Perro? |
| 2014 | "Solamente Tù" (Damien Sargue feat. Pablo Alborán) | — | Latin Lovers |
| 2016 | "Tu frialdad" (José Mercé feat. Pablo Alborán) | — | Doy La Cara |
| 2019 | "Rayando El Sol" (Maná feat. Pablo Alborán) | — | Non-album single |

==== Other charting songs ====
| Year | Title | Peak chart positions | Album |
| Year | Title | SPA | Album |
|---|---|---|---|
| 2012 | No te olvidaré | 37 | En Acústico |
| 2014 | Quimera (featuring Ricky Martin) | 30 | Terral |
| 2014 | Gracias | 22 | Terral |
| 2015 | Sous le ciel de Paris (Zaz feat. Pablo Alborán) | 42 | Paris |
| 2017 | Al Paraíso | 72 | Prometo |
| 2017 | Boca De Hule | 54 | Prometo |
| 2017 | Cuerda Al Corazón | 92 | Prometo |
| 2017 | Lo Nuestro | 98 | Prometo |
| 2017 | Vivir | 74 | Prometo |

== Filmography ==
=== Television ===
Leo Harlem' film credits
| Year | Title | Role | Notes | Ref(s) |
|---|---|---|---|---|
| 2011 | Cuando me sonreís | Himself | 2 episodes | |
| 2013 | Aída | Himself | 1 episode | |
| 2014 | Dreamland | Himself | 1 episode | |
| 2025 | Respira (Breathless) | Jon Balanzetegui | Series regular (7 episodes) | |

== Awards and nominations ==
=== Grammy Awards ===
The Grammy Awards are awarded annually by the National Academy of Recording Arts and Sciences in the United States. Alborán has received four nominations.

| Year | Nominee / work | Award | Result | Ref. |
|---|---|---|---|---|
| 2016 | Terral | Best Latin Pop Album | Nominated | |
| 2019 | Prometo | Best Latin Pop Album | Nominated | |
| 2022 | Vértigo | Best Latin Pop Album | Nominated | |
| 2024 | La Cuarta Hoja | Best Latin Pop Album | Nominated | |

=== Latin Grammy Awards ===
The Latin Grammy Awards are awarded annually by the Latin Academy of Recording Arts & Sciences in the United States. Alborán has received 30 nominations.

| Year | Nominee / work | Award | Result | Ref. |
|---|---|---|---|---|
| 2011 | Pablo Alborán | Best New Artist | Nominated | |
| 2011 | "Solamente Tú" | Song of the Year | Nominated | |
| 2011 | Pablo Alborán | Best Male Pop Vocal Album | Nominated | |
| 2012 | En Acústico | Best Contemporary Pop Vocal Album | Nominated | |
| 2013 | "Tanto" | Record of the Year | Nominated | |
| 2013 | Tanto | Album of the Year | Nominated | |
| 2013 | Tanto | Best Traditional Pop Vocal Album | Nominated | |
| 2014 | "Dónde está el Amor" | Record of the Year | Nominated | |
| 2015 | Terral | Best Contemporary Pop Vocal Album | Nominated | |
| 2015 | Terral | Best Long Form Music Video | Nominated | |
| 2015 | "Por Fin" | Song of the Year | Nominated | |
| 2016 | Tour Terral | Album of the Year | Nominated | |
| 2016 | Tour Terral | Best Contemporary Pop Vocal Album | Nominated | |
| 2016 | "Se Puede Amar" | Record of the Year | Nominated | |
| 2018 | Prometo | Album of the Year | Nominated | |
| 2018 | Prometo | Best Traditional Pop Vocal Album | Nominated | |
| 2018 | "No Vaya a Ser" | Record of the Year | Nominated | |
| 2020 | "Cuando Estés Aquí" | Record of the Year | Nominated | |
| 2020 | "Cuando Estés Aquí" | Best Pop Song | Nominated | |
| 2021 | "Si Hubieras Querido" | Record of the Year | Nominated | |
| 2021 | "Si Hubieras Querido" | Song of the Year | Nominated | |
| 2021 | Vértigo | Album of the Year | Nominated | |
| 2021 | Vértigo | Best Traditional Pop Vocal Album | Nominated | |
| 2022 | "Castillos de Arena" | Record of the Year | Nominated | |
| 2023 | La Cuarta Hoja | Album of the Year | Nominated | |
| 2023 | La Cuarta Hoja | Best Pop Vocal Album | Nominated | |
| 2023 | "Carretera y Manta" | Record of the Year | Nominated | |
| 2023 | "Amigos" | Song of the Year | Nominated | |
| 2023 | "Contigo" | Best Pop Song | Nominated | |
| 2026 | KMO | Best Contemporary Pop Album | Nominated | |

=== TVyNovelas Awards ===
The TVyNovelas Awards are presented annually by Televisa and the magazine TVyNovelas to honor the best Mexican television productions, including telenovelas.

| Year | Nominee / work | Award | Result | Ref. |
|---|---|---|---|---|
| 2017 | "Se Puede Amar" | Best Musical Theme | Won | |
| 2018 | "Saturno" | Best Musical Theme | Won | |

=== Goya Awards ===
The Goya Awards, known in Spanish as los Premios Goya, are awarded annually by the Academia de las Artes y las Ciencias Cinematográficas de España (Spanish Academy of Cinematic Art and Science) in Spain. Alborán has received one award.

| Year | Nominee / work | Award | Result | Ref. |
|---|---|---|---|---|
| 2016 | Palmeras en la nieve (with Lucas Vidal) | Best Original Song | Won | |

=== LOS40 Music Awards ===
| Year | Recipient(s) and nominee(s) | Category | Result |
|---|---|---|---|
| 2011 | Himself | Best New Act | Won |
| 2011 | Pablo Alborán | Best Album | Nominated |
| 2012 | Himself | Best Act | Won |
| 2012 | "Te He Echado de Menos" | Best Song | Won |
| 2012 | "Te He Echado de Menos" | Best Video | Nominated |
| 2012 | En Acústico | Best Album | Nominated |
| 2013 | Himself | Best Spanish Act | Won |
| 2013 | "Quién" | Best Spanish Video | Nominated |
| 2013 | Tanto | Best Spanish Album | Won |
| 2013 | Tanto | Best Spanish Song | Nominated |
| 2013 | Vuelvo a Verte (with Malú) | Best Spanish Song | Won |
| 2013 | Gira 2013 | Best Spanish Festival, Tour or Concert | Nominated |
| 2015 | Himself | Best Spanish Act | Won |
| 2015 | Pasos de Cero | Best Spanish Song | Won |
| 2015 | Pasos de Cero | Best Spanish Video | Nominated |
| 2015 | Terral | Best Spanish Album | Nominated |
| 2015 | Tour Terral | Best Festival, Tour or Concert in Spain | Nominated |
| 2018 | Himself | Artist of the Year | Won |
| 2018 | Prometo | Album of the Year | Won |
| 2018 | No Vaya a Ser | Song of the Year | Nominated |
| 2018 | No Vaya a Ser | Video of the Year | Nominated |
| 2018 | Tour Prometo | Tour of the Year | Nominated |
| 2020 | Himself | Best Act | Nominated |
| 2020 | "Tabú" (with Ava Max) | Best Song | Nominated |
| 2020 | "Tabú" (with Ava Max) | Best Video | Won |
| 2021 | Himself | Best Act | Nominated |
| 2021 | Vértigo | Best Album | Won |
| 2021 | "Si Hubieras Querido" | Best Song | Nominated |
| 2023 | "Amigos" (with Maria Becerra) | Best Collaboration | Nominated |
| 2023 | La Cuarta Hoja Tour | Best Tour, Festival or Concert | Nominated |
| 2025 | Himself | Global Icon | Honored |

=== MTV Europe Music Awards ===
| Year | Nominee / work | Award | Result |
|---|---|---|---|
| 2013 | Himself | Best Spanish Act | Nominated |
| 2021 | Himself | Best Spanish Act | Nominated |
