= Recuérdame (Pablo Alborán song) =

Single by Pablo Alborán

from the album Terral
- Released: 2 June 2015
- Length: 4:52
- Label: Warner Music
- Songwriter: Pablo Alborán
- Producer: Eric Rosse

Pablo Alborán singles chronology
"Pasos de cero" (2014)	"Recuérdame" (2015)	"Inséparables" (2015)

Music video
- "Recuérdame" on YouTube

"Recuérdame" (English: "Remember Me") is a song recorded by Spanish singer-songwriter Pablo Alborán. A single edit was released as the third single from his third studio album, Terral (2014).

A French version was released on 5 October 2015 titled, "Ne M'Oublie Pas"

In an interview with Billboard in November 2015, Alborán said; "Recuérdame" used to a song that really hurt when I sang it but then after a while it stops hurting and it’s like therapy."

== Music video ==
The music video for "Recuérdame" was released on 9 June 2015.

== Track listing ==
Digital download

1. "Recuérdame" - 4:52

Digital download

1. "Ne M'Oublie Pas" - 4:53

== Chart performance ==
Chart (2014–15)	Peak position
Spain (PROMUSICAE)	5
US Hot Latin Songs (Billboard)	34
US Hot Latin Songs (Billboard)	29
US Latin Pop Airplay (Billboard)	5
