= Pasos de cero =

Single by Pablo Alborán

from the album Terral
- Released: 21 January 2015
- Recorded: 2014
- Length: 3:55
- Label: Warner Music
- Songwriter: Pablo Alborán
- Producer: Eric Rosse

Pablo Alborán singles chronology
"Por Fin" (2014)	"Pasos de cero" (2015)	"Recuérdame" (2015)
Recuérdame (2015)	Inséparables (2015)	Vívela (2015)

Alternative cover
- "Inséparables" cover art (with Zaz)

Music video
- "Pasos de cero" on YouTube

"Pasos de cero" (roughly "Steps from scratch") is a song recorded by Spanish singer-songwriter Pablo Alborán. It was released as the second single from his third studio album, Terral. The song was written by Alborán and produced by Eric Rosse.

A French version was released in July 2015 as "Inseparables" as a duet with French singer Zaz. Alborán and Zaz had collaborated a month earlier on the track, "Sous le ciel de Paris" which was included on Zaz's 2014 album, Paris.

The track was included in a special French edition of Alborán’s album Terral, released in January 2016.

== Music video ==
The music video for "Pasos de cero" was directed by Gus Carballo and filmed in Málaga in December 2014. The clip was released on 21 January 2015.

The music video for "Inseparables" was released on 1 September 2015.

== Chart performance ==
=== "Pasos de cero" ===
Chart (2014)	Peak position
Spain (PROMUSICAE)	1
US Latin Pop Airplay (Billboard)	34

=== "Inséparables" ===
Chart (2015)	Peak position
Spain (PROMUSICAE)	37

== Certifications ==
Region	Certification	Certified units/sales
Spain (Promusicae)	Platinum	60,000^{‡}
United States (RIAA)	Platinum (Latin)	60,000^{‡}
^{‡} Sales+streaming figures based on certification alone.

== See also ==
- List of number-one singles of 2014 (Spain)

== Release history ==
Title	Date	Version	Format	Label
Pasos de cero	11 November 2014	Solo version	Digital download	Warner Music Spain
Inséparables	10 July 2015	featuring Zaz	Digital download	Warner Music Spain
