= Por Fin =

Single by Pablo Alborán

from the album Terral
- Released: 16 September 2014
- Genre: Soft rock
- Length: 3:37
- Label: Warner Music Spain
- Songwriter: Pablo Alborán
- Producer: Eric Rosse

Pablo Alborán singles chronology
"Dónde está el Amor" (2013)	"Por Fin" (2014)	"Pasos de cero" (2014)

"Por Fin" ("Finally") is a song recorded by Spanish singer-songwriter Pablo Alborán. The song was released as the first single from his third studio album Terral (2014). The song was written by Alborán and produced by Eric Rosse. "Por Fin" is a soft rock ballad. Alborán received a nomination for Song of the Year at the 16th Latin Grammy Awards.

== Chart performance ==
=== Weekly charts ===
Chart (2014–15)	Peak position
Spain (PROMUSICAE)	1
Mexico (Billboard Mexican Airplay)	9
US Latin Airplay (Billboard)	44
US Latin Pop Airplay (Billboard)	35

=== Year-end charts ===
End Of Year (2014)	Peak position
Spain (PROMUSICAE)	21

End Of Year (2015)	Peak position
Spain (PROMUSICAE)	76

== Certifications ==
Region	Certification	Certified units/sales
Spain (Promusicae)	Platinum	60,000^{‡}
United States (RIAA)	Gold (Latin)	30,000^{‡}
^{‡} Sales+streaming figures based on certification alone.

== See also ==
- List of number-one singles of 2014 (Spain)
