= 2012 in Latin music =

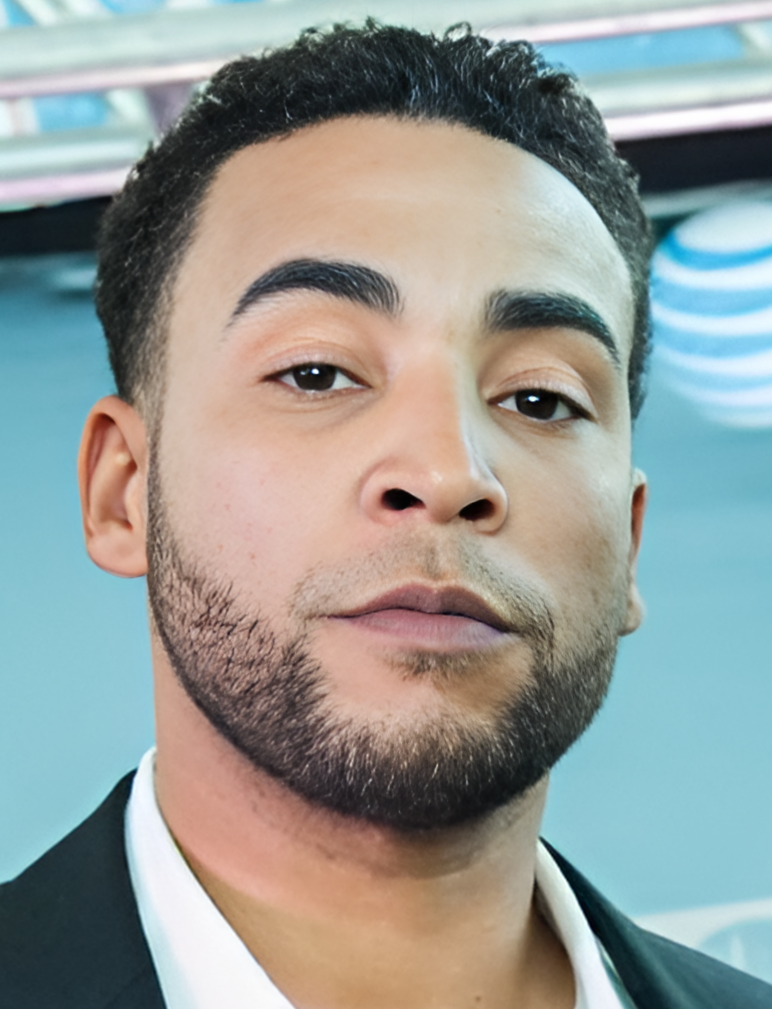
Puerto Rican singer Don Omar was named Top Latin Artist of the Year in the United States by Billboard.

This is a list of notable events in Latin music (i.e. Spanish- and Portuguese-speaking music from Latin America, Europe, and the United States) that took place in 2012.

== Events ==
- October 20 – Billboard updates their methodology for several of their charts including the Hot Latin Songs. The new methodology for the Hot Latin Songs chart includes sales of digital downloads and streaming activity of Spanish-language songs as well as airplay of Spanish-language songs on all radio stations in the United States. Billboard also imposes a linguistic rule of a song being predominantly sung in Spanish to be eligible to rank on the Hot Latin Songs. Previously, the Hot Latin Songs chart ranked the most-played songs on Spanish-language radio states regardless of language or genre. The Latin Airplay, which was also established, is based on the Hot Latin Song's former methodology.
- November 15 — The 13th Annual Latin Grammy Awards are held at the Mandalay Bay Events Center in Las Vegas, Nevada.
  - "¡Corre!" by Jesse & Joy wins Record the Year and Song of the Year
  - Juanes: MTV Unplugged by Juanes wins Album of the Year
  - 3Ball MTY wins Best New Artist
  - Brazilian singer Caetano Veloso was honored as the Latin Recording Academy Person of the Year
- December 9 — A plane carrying Mexican-American singer Jenni Rivera and six other passengers crashes near Iturbide, Nuevo León, killing everyone on board.

== Number-one albums and singles by country ==
- List of Hot 100 number-one singles of 2012 (Brazil)
- List of number-one songs of 2012 (Colombia)
- List of number-one albums of 2012 (Mexico)
- List of number-one albums of 2012 (Portugal)
- List of number-one albums of 2012 (Spain)
- List of number-one singles of 2012 (Spain)
- List of number-one Billboard Latin Albums from the 2010s
- List of number-one Billboard Top Latin Songs of 2012

== Awards ==
- 2012 Premio Lo Nuestro
- 2012 Billboard Latin Music Awards
- 2012 Latin Grammy Awards
- 2012 Tejano Music Awards

== Albums released ==
=== First quarter ===
==== January ====
Day	Title	Artist	Genre(s)	Singles	Label
1	40 Anos Depois	João Bosco	MPB		Universal, MPB Discos
1	María Teresa Chacín Canta Cuentos	María Teresa Chacín			
3	Brasileiro: Works of Francisco Mignone	Cuarteto Latinoamericano	Modern		Sono Luminus
17	Sembrando Flores	Los Cojolites			Round Whirled Records
17	Further Explorations	Chick Corea, Eddie Gómez and Paul Motian	Post Bop, Modal, Cool Jazz	"Alice In Wonderland" "Turn Out The Stars"	Concord Jazz
21	Busco un Pueblo	Víctor Manuelle	Salsa	"Si Tú Me Besas" "Ella Lo Que Quiere Es Salsa"	Sony Music Latin
24	Irreversible ... 2012	La Arrolladora Banda El Limón	Banda	"No La Voy A Engañar" "Irreversible" "Llamada De Mi Ex" "No Me Vengas A Decir"	Disa
28	El Imperio Nazza	Musicologo y Menes	Reggaeton		El Cartel Records
31	365 Días	Los Tucanes de Tijuana		"Amor Compartido" "365 Días" "Salió Del Closet (Banda Sinaloense Version)" "365 Días (Banda Sinaloense Version)"	
31	Tempo	Eddie Gomez, Tania Maria	Bossa Nova, Latin Jazz		Naive

==== February ====
Day	Title	Artist	Genre(s)	Singles	Label
6	Yo Soy Generasion	Generasion	Hard Rock		Rejoice Music
7	Un Pokito de Rocanrol	Bebe	Latin Pop, Rock En Espanol	"Joyas/ABC" "Compra Paga" "K.I.E.R.E.M.E."	EMI
9	Canto da Sereia	Regina Benedetti			
11	El Tango Lo Siento Así	Carlos Bosio			
20	Acústico na Ópera de Arame	Fernando & Sorocaba	Brazilian Traditions		Som Livre
21	Un Hombre Normal	Espinoza Paz	Mexican Traditions, Latin Pop, Banda, Norteno	"Un Hombre Normal," "El Proximo Viernes," "24 Horas (Version Balada)," "Nina Bien," "Lo Intentamos (DJ Pelos Radio Mix)"	Disa, Universal Music Group
24	Masters Of Bandoneon	Cuartetango String Quartet	Chamber Music, Tango, South American Traditions		
28	Colección Cristiana	Juan Luis Guerra	Salsa, Bachata		
28	Diciembre	Leiva	Pop rock		Sony Music
28	Amor En Tiempos de Guerra	Regulo Caro	Mexican Traditions		DEL Records, Sony Music Latin
28	El Buen Ejemplo	Calibre 50	Banda, Norteno, Mexican Traditions	"Mujer De Todos, Mujer De Nadie" "Bohemio Loco" "Gente Batallosa" "El Buen Ejemplo"	Disa, Universal Music Latin Entertainment
28	Imaginaries	Quetzal	Folk Rock		Smithsonian Folkways

==== March ====
Day	Title	Artist	Genre(s)	Singles	Label
1	Quando Chega a Noite	Luan Santana	Forro		Som Livre
4	Mi Tributo al Festival: Zona Preferente	Yuri			Warner Music Mexico
8	Público	No Te Va Gustar	Alternative Rock, Reggae, Ska		Bizarro Records
13	Flamenco Sketches	Chano Domínguez	Post-Bop, Global Jazz, Latin Jazz, Piano Jazz	"Flamenco Sketches" "Freddie Freeloader" "Nardis"	Blue Note
13	Algo Esta Pasando	Joe Posada	Mexican Traditions, Tejano		
16	Bonanza	Panda	Alternative Rock		Movie Records, EMI, Bunker Producciones
20	Los Reyes del Tribal	El Pelon del Mikrophone			
22	Muerte	Canserbero			
24	Los Duros: The Mixtape	Baby Rasta & Gringo			
27	Dvorak Symphony No. 7; In Nature's Realm, Scherzo Capriccioso	José Serebrier	Symphony		
27	Sinaloense Hasta Las Cachas	Fidel Rueda	Mexican Traditions, Norteno, Ranchera		Disa
27	La Gritera	Los Inquietos del Norte	Mexican Traditions, Norteno, Corrido		
27	Déjenme Llorar	Carla Morrison			
27	Desnuda	Ednita Nazario	Dance-Pop, Dominican Traditions, Latin Pop, Merengue, Tropical, Salsa	"Para El Peor Amante" "Tocame" "Sin Pensar" "Caida Libre"	Sony Music Latin

=== Second quarter ===
==== April ====
Day	Title	Artist	Genre(s)	Singles	Label
1	Anfibio	Lisandro Aristimuño	Alternative Rock		Viento Azul Discos
3	Enamorada de Ti	Selena	Adult Contemporary, Dance-Pop, Latin Pop, Mexican Traditions, Tejano	"No Me Queda Mas" "Amor Prohibido"	Capitol Latin
3	Caravana Sereia Bloom	Céu	Downtempo, MPB, Bossa Nova		Six Degrees Records
5	Guarachando	Miguel García	Salsa, Son, Rumba, Guaracha		Miguel Garcia Music
9	La Conexión	Black Guayaba			
10	Phase II	Prince Royce	Bachata, Mariachi, Ballad	"Las Cosas Pequeñas" "Incondicional" "Te Me Vas"	Top Stop Music
10	Piano y Charango	Chuchito Valdés and Eddy Navia			
10	Não Tente Comprender	Mart'nália	Samba, MPB		Biscoito Fino
11	Tromboranga	Tromboranga	Salsa	"Amigo El Raton" "Agua Que Va Caer"	
17	Electro-Jarocho	Sistema Bomb	Son, Afro-Cuban, Experimental		Round Whirrled Records, Zepada Bros, Dragora Grupo Comercial, S.A. De C.V.
20	Treme	Gaby Amarantos	MPB, Axe, Lambada		Som Livre
24	Especial Ivete, Gil E Caetano	Caetano Veloso, Gilberto Gil and Ivete Sangalo	Axe, MPB, Samba, Bossa Nova		
24	Lo Que El Viento Me Enseñó	Tercer Cielo	Bachata		Kasa Prodducciones
24	Calle Soledad	José Luis Perales	Chanson, Vocal, Ballad		
24	Reza	Rita Lee	MPB		Biscoito Fino
25	Realidad En Vivo	Buena Vista Social Club	Tropical, Salsa	"Guajira En FM"	Terrascape
25	Porfiado	El Cuarteto de Nos	Pop rock, Classic Rock		Warner Music Argentina
25	Instinto	Maía	Ballad, Bossa Nova		Sony Music, Columbia, Day 1 Entertainment
30	Un Bolero Para Tí	Eliades Ochoa	Bolero		

==== May ====
Day	Title	Artist	Genre(s)	Singles	Label
1	Don Omar Presents MTO²: New Generation	Don Omar	Reggaeton, Euro House	"Dutty Love" "Hasta Que Salga el Sol" "Zumba"	Machete Music
1	Los Monsters	Elvis Crespo	Hip-House, Merengue, Vallenato	"Yo No Soy un Monstro"	Vene Music, Flash Music, Universal Music Latin Entertainment
1	Retro	Marlow Rosado & La Riqueña	Salsa, Bolero		Pink Chaos Productions
2	Vamos Pa' La Fiesta	Septeto Santiaguero	Son, Bolero, Cumbia, Guaracha		Picap
4	Arriba Siempre - De Pura Sangre	Michel El Buenon	Salsa		
4	25 Concierto Conmemorativo	Marcos Witt			CanZion
4	Rompe El Silencio	Paulina Aguirre			
4	Clásicos – El Pecado Original	Los Nocheros	Ballad, Folk, Vocal		S-Music, Sony Music
8	Fiesta Tribal	DJ Gelo			
8	Dear Diz (Every Day I Think of You)	Arturo Sandoval			Concord Jazz
8	Back On Track	Los Hermanos Farías	Tejano, Bolero, Cumbia		Ro' Records
14	Oásis de Bethânia	Maria Bethânia	Brazilian Traditions		Biscoito Fino
15	Desde Rusia con Amor	Molotov	Alternative Rock		Universal Music
19	Barra Da Saia	Karyme Hass			
20	Amorágio	Ivan Lins	MPB		Som Livre
21	Trio Ellas	Trio Ellas			
22	Un Lujo	Lucero and Joan Sebastian	Latin pop, mariachi	"Caminar Contigo" "Diséñame"	Skalona Records
22	The Most Powerful Rookie	Farruko	Reggaeton		
28	MTV Unplugged	Juanes	Pop rock, Latin Pop	"La Señal" "Me Enamora"	Universal Music Latino
28	Live in Chicago	Chuchito Valdes			Music Roots Records
29	Eba Say Ajá	Rubén Blades and Cheo Feliciano	Salsa		Ariel Rivas Music
29	Mas de Un Camino	Pepe Aguilar	Ranchara		Vene Music, Universal Music Latin Entertainment, Equinoccio, Cisneros
29	Meus Encantos	Paula Fernandes	Sertanejo		Universal Music

==== June ====
Day	Title	Artist	Genre(s)	Singles	Label
1	20 Años	Gian Marco Zignago			
2	El Imperio Nazza: Gold Edition	Musicologo y Menes	Reggaeton		El Cartel Records
5	New Cuban Express	Manuel Valera New Cuban Express			
5	El Mar de Mi Ventana	Niño Josele	Flamenco		DRO
9	Le Canta A San Jacinto	Juan Piña			
15	Experimentango	Susana Rinaldi	Experimental, Tango		DBN
19	El Regreso De La Conga	Patricio Hidalgo	Tropical		
19	Oye	Mariachi Divas de Cindy Shea			
19	The Original Gallo Del País – O.G. El Mixtape	Tego Calderón			Jiggiri Records, Empire
26	Una Noche de Luna	Marco Antonio Solís	Latin		Fonovisa Records
26	A Corazón Abierto	El Trono de Mexico			
26	La Salsa Vive	N'Klabe	Salsa	"Mi Vida Eres Tú"	Sony Music Latin, Nulife Entertainment

=== Third quarter ===
==== July ====
Day	Title	Artist	Genre(s)	Singles	Label
1	Cambié de Nombre	Viniloversus	Indie Rock		Altamira Artists
3	Líderes	Wisin & Yandel	Reggaeton	"Follow the Leader" "Algo Me Gusta de Ti"	Machete Music, Universal Music Latin Entertainment
3	Estilo Italiano	Jesus Ojea & Sus Parientes			
3	Ondatrópica	Ondatrópica	Cumbia		Soundway
6	Lo Mejor Que Hay En Mi Vida	Andrés Cepeda			FM Entretenimiento S.A.S.
9	Día y Medio	Paquito D'Rivera and Berta Rojas			
9	Ao Vivo: Rock in Rio	Jota Quest	Pop rock		
10	De Miles Maneras... Sin Límites	Conjunto Atardecer			
10	Chambao	Chambao			
10	Ousadia & Alegria	Thiaguinho	Samba		
16	Eletrosamba – Ao Vivo	Alexandre Pires	Samba		Sony Music
17	Cosas Perdidas	Ulises Hadjis	Alternative Rock, Indie Pop		
17	Sueño de la Máquina	Kinky	Alternative Rock, Latin		
19	A Lo Under, Vol. 1 - Perreo	Nico Canada	Reggaeton		White Lion Records
19	A Lo Under, Vol. 2 - Zona De Perreo	Nico Canada	Reggaeton		White Lion Records
20	Tango Como Yo Te Siento	Arturo Sandoval			
23	Canciones de Agua	Rita Rosa y Amigos			
23	Ao Vivo em Floripa	Victor & Leo	Country		Sony Music
26	Estoy Feliz	Karito			
24	El Muchacho	Roberto Tapia			Fonovisa Records
30	Kany Garcia	Kany Garcia			
31	Texas Towns & Tex-Mex Sounds	Los Texmaniacs			Smithsonian Folkways

==== August ====
Day	Title	Artist	Genre(s)	Singles	Label
3	Diogo Nogueira Ao Vivo em Cuba	Diogo Nogueira	Brazilian Traditions, Samba		EMI
6	Brasileiro	Nelson Freire			Decca
7	Ves Lo Que Quieres Ver	Bareto	Cumbia, Alternative Rock, Reggae, Dub, Merengue, Son		Play Music & Video
7	Regreso A Ti	Alex Campos			
14	Multiverse	Bobby Sanabria			
14	La Música	Mariachi Sol de México de José Hernández con La Sinfónica de Las Américas			
14	Ao Vivo: Rock in Rio	Skank			
21	La Fórmula	Various artists	Reggaeton, latin pop	"Te Dijeron" "Cuando Te Enamores" "Flow Violento" "La Formula Sigue" "Diosa De Los Corazones" "More" "Ella Me Dice"	Pina
21	Musa	Ivy Queen	Reggaeton	"Peligro de Extinción" "Cupido" "Cuando Las Mujeres" "No Hay"	Siente Music, Universal Music Latin Entertainment
21	Solstis	Leon Larregui	Alternative Rock		
21	Mi Promesa	Pesado	Norteno		Disa
21	Con el Corazón Abierto	Héctor Acosta "el Torito"	Bachata, Merengue, Ballad	"Tu Veneno" "No Soy un Hombre Malo" "No Moriré"	Vene Music, D.A.M. Production Inc., Universal Music Latin Entertainment
22	Irrevente	Kvrass			
27	Alice Caymmi	Alice Caymmi	Vocal, Ballad, Cubano		Kuarup, Sony Music
28	Exiliados en la Bahía: Lo Mejor de Maná	Maná	Soft Rock Music, Ballad	"Hasta Que Te Conocí"	Warner Music Latina
28	Desde Nueva York a Puerto Rico	Eddie Montalvo	Salsa	"Amor En Serio" "Ensillala" "Leccion Rumbera"	Select-O-Hits, Senor Marcha Records
28	Duos III	Luciana Souza	Samba		Sunnyside
28	Nossa Verdade	Vowe	Alternative Rock		Midas Music, Universal Music
28	Me Atizo Macizo Tour	Cartel de Santa			Sony Music, Culebra, Babilonia Music
30	Cubano Soy	Rauúl Lara & Sus Soneros			

==== September ====
Day	Title	Artist	Genre(s)	Singles	Label
1	El Imperio Nazza: Gotay Edition	Musicologo y Menes, Gotay	Reggaeton		El Cartel Records
3	Papitwo	Miguel Bosé			
3	Heitor Villa-Lobos Symphony No. 6 'On the Outline of the Mountains of Brazil'; Symphony No. 7	Isaac Karabtchevsky	Modern		Naxos
4	Elegancia Tropical	Bomba Estéreo	Cumbia		
4	Postales	Gaby Moreno			
7	2012 Fin y Principio de Una Era	Cuisillos de Arturo Macias			
11	Prestige	Daddy Yankee	Reggaeton	"Ven Conmigo" "Lovumba" "Pasarela" "Limbo" "Noche de los Dos"	El Cartel
11	¡Ritmo!	The Clare Fischer Latin Jazz Big Band	Big Band		Clavo Records
15	Rua Dos Amores	Djavan			
17	El Primer Ministro	Gerardo Ortíz			Sony Music
17	Natiruts Acústico no Rio de Janeiro	Natiruts	Reggae		Zeroneutro Corp., Sony Music
18	Y Ahora Resulta	Voz de Mando	Corrido		Disa Records
18	Primario	DLD	Alternative Rock, Pop rock		
18	Mujer Divina – Homenaje a Agustín Lara	Natalia Lafourcade	Ballad, Vocal, Alternative Rock, Latin Pop		
18	On the Way	Negroni's Trio			
25	La Música No Se Toca	Alejandro Sanz	Ballad, Pop rock, Soft Rock	"No Me Compares" "Se Vende" "Mi Marciana"	Warner Music Spain
25	Transformación	Beto Cuevas	Pop rock		
25	Vicentico 5	Vicentico	Pop rock		
25	Viva la Vida	Vikki Carr	Mariachi, Bolero, Ranchera		Sony Music Latin
25	Un Viaje Por El Cante	Argentina	Flamenco		Rosevil, Luismi Producciones
25	La gigantona	Alfonso Noel Lovo			
26	Diferente	Felipe Peláez and Manuel Julián	Vallenato, Ballad, Norteno		

=== Fourth quarter ===
==== October ====
Day	Title	Artist	Genre(s)	Singles	Label
1	A Hora É Agora	Jorge & Mateus			
2	12 Historias	Tommy Torres			Warner Music Latina
2	Autorretrato	Estrella Morente	Flamenco		
2	Concerto de Cordas & Máquinas de Ritmo	Gilberto Gil	MPB		
3	Como un Huracán	Los Huracanes del Norte			
5	Pacific Mambo Orchestra	Pacific Mambo Orchestra	Salsa, Bolero		Pacific Mambo Orchestra
8	Dvorák Symphonies 3 & 6	José Serebrier	Romantic		Warner Classics
11	Mi Única Llave	José Mercé	Flamenco		Blue Note Flamenco, EMI
16	Viajero Frecuente	Ricardo Montaner	Ballad, Vocal	"Convénceme" "La Canción Que Necesito" "Time"	
16	Pegate	Grupo Treo			
16	Tangos y Canciones Criollas	Hernán Lucero	Tango		Sony Music, Alfiz Producciones Discograficas
18	El Calor del Pleno Invierno	No Te Va Gustar			Bizarro Records
22	El Objeto Antes Llamado Disco	Café Tacuba	Alternative Rock, Experimental		Universal Music Group
23	Otras Verdades	India Martínez	Flamenco		Sony Music
24	Adagio	José Serebrier and St. Michel Strings			
25	Amor Sin Control	Tumbadora Reina Sonora	Salsa, Tropical, Rumba		
26	Escultura	Guaco	Salsa, Fusion, Latin Jazz		
27	De Cantos Y Vuelos	María Mulata			WEA
28	Abaporu	Laura Lopes			LauraLopes
29	Chances	Illya Kuryaki and the Valderramas	P.Funk, Disco		
30	Entrégate	Tierra Cali			
30	Amémonos Homenaje A Lucha Villa	Sheyla Tadeo			
30	Pá La Raza	El Dasa			
30	Live in Hollywood	Poncho Sanchez and His Latin Jazz Band	Latin Jazz, Afro-Cuban, Boogaloo, Mambo, Salsa		Concord Picante

==== November ====
Day	Title	Artist	Genre(s)	Singles	Label
6	The King Stays King: Sold Out at Madison Square Garden	Romeo Santos	Bachata, Ballad, Reggaeton	"Llévame Contigo"	Sony Music Latin
6	Tanto	Pablo Alborán	Vocal	"Tanto" "El Beso" "Quién" "Éxtasis" "Dónde está el Amor"	
6	Blanco	Eruca Sativa			Sony Discos, MTM Discos
6	New Horizons	Jay Perez	Tejano		Freddie Records
6	Redescobrir – Ao Vivo	Maria Rita	MPB		Universal Music
9	Mi Refugio	Daniel Calveti			
12	A Las Personas de Mi Vida	Emilio Navaira	Cumbia, Conjunto, Tejano		Sony Latin
13	Syntek	Aleks Syntek	Synth-Pop, Synthwave, Electro, Pop rock		
13	Gilberto Santa Rosa	Gilberto Santa Rosa	Bolero	"Estas Ahi" "Si Yo Fuera Tu"	Sony Music Entertainment US Latin LLC
13	Celebrando Al Príncipe	Cristian Castro	Ballad	"Mi Vida"	Universal Music Group
19	Habítame Siempre	Thalía	Bachata, Ballad, Trova, Latin Pop	"Manias" "Te Perdiste Mi Amor" "La Apuesta"	Sony Music Latin
19	Invicto	Tito "El Bambino"	Reggaeton, Merengue, Cumbia, Bachata, Salsa	"Dame La Ola" "¿Por Qué les Mientes?" "Tu Olor" "Carnaval"	On Fire Music
19	Hecho con Sabor a Puerto Rico	Various artists	Bolero, Salsa		Select-O-Hits
19	Mi Razón de Ser	Banda Sinaloense MS De Sergio Lizarraga	Banda		Disa, Universal Music Latin Entertainment
19	Luz – Una Navidad Celta En Venezuela	Gaêlica	Celtic, Folk, Holiday		
20	Jesus, O Brasil Te Adora	Eyshila	Gospel		Central Gospel Music
20	Músicas Para Churrasco Vol. 1 Ao Vivo	Seu Jorge	Samba, Bossanova, MPB		
21	Um Olhar Sobre Villa-Lobos	Mario Adnet			Boranda
29	Profeta Da Esperança	Kleber Lucas	Gospel		MK Music

==== December ====
Day	Title	Artist	Genre(s)	Singles	Label
1	Vamos A Bailar	Atención Atención			Atencion Atencion
2	Piazzolla de Cámara	Ramírez-Satorre			
3	Que Seas Feliz	Tito Nieves	Salsa	"Que Seas Feliz"	
4	Asondeguerra Tour	Juan Luis Guerra 4.40	Bachata, Salsa, Sonero	"Apaga y Vámonos" "La Calle" "Frió Frió" "Bachata en Fukuoka" "En el Cielo No Hay Hospital"	Capitol Latin
4	Abraçaço	Caetano Veloso	Bossa Nova		
10	Tercera Llamada	Tren a Marte			
10	Herivelto Martins – 100 Anos	Various artists			Lua Music
11	La Misma Gran Señora	Jenni Rivera	Ranchara, Banda, Corrido	"La Misma Gran Señora"	Fonovisa
11	Regresa el Rey	Ramon Ayala & Sus Bravos del Norte			
12	Four Magical Stories to Live	Miami Lighthouse for the Blind			
15	Imperio Nazza: J Álvarez Edition	J Alvarez	Reggaeton		Imperio Nazza Records
17	El Mundo Se Acabo	Siggno			
18	Cores	Marcos & Belutti			
20	Latin American Classics	Theodore Kuchar conducting The Orquesta Sinfónica de Venezuela			Brilliant Classics

=== Unknown ===
Title	Artist	Genre(s)	Singles	Label
Salseando	Leoni Torres	Salsa		
Zona Preferente: Mi Tributo Al Festival	Yuri			Warner Music Mexico
Histórico – A Duo Con Los Grandes	Omar Geles			
Volando Alto – Made on the Road	Elain			
No Que No...	Pedro Fernández			
Rasgando Seda	Guinga + Quinteto Villa-Lobos			
Me Emborrache Pa' Olvidarla	Reynaldo Armas			
Eva Ayllón + Inti-Illimani Histórico	Eva Ayllón + Inti-Illimani			
Con Alma de Pueblo	Luciano Pereyra			
Jammil na Real	Jammil			
A Festa	João Bosco & Vinícius			
Juventud Americana	Ases Falsos			
La alianza profana	Dengue Dengue Dengue!			
GP	Gepe			

== Best-selling records ==
=== Best-selling albums ===
The following is a list of the top 10 best-selling Latin albums in the United States in 2012, according to Billboard.

Rank	Album	Artist
1	Formula, Vol. 1	Romeo Santos
2	Phase II	Prince Royce
3	Inténtalo	3Ball MTY
4	Joyas Prestadas: Banda	Jenni Rivera
5	Don Omar Presents MTO²: New Generation	Don Omar
6	Independiente	Ricardo Arjona
7	Irreversible... 2012	La Arrolladora Banda El Limón
8	Drama y Luz	Maná
9	Entre Dios y El Diablo	Gerardo Ortíz
10	Líderes	Wisin & Yandel

=== Best-performing songs ===
The following is a list of the top 10 best-performing Latin songs in the United States in 2012, according to Billboard.

Rank	Single	Artist
1	"Llamada De Mi Ex"	La Arrolladora Banda El Limón
2	"Dutty Love"	Don Omar
3	"Inténtalo"	3Ball MTY
4	"Bailando Por El Mundo"	Juan Magan featuring Pitbull and El Cata
5	"Ai Se Eu Te Pego"	Michel Teló
6	"Amor Confuso"	Gerardo Ortíz
7	"Lovumba"	Daddy Yankee
8	"Un Hombre Normal"	Espinoza Paz
9	"El Verdadero Amor Perdona"	Maná featuring Prince Royce
10	"Las Cosas Pequeñas"	Prince Royce

== Deaths ==
- January 9 – Ruth Fernández, 92, Puerto Rican contralto and politician, Senator (1973–1981).
- February 8:
  - Wando, 66, Brazilian singer-songwriter
  - Luis Alberto Spinetta, 62, Argentine musician (Almendra, Pescado Rabioso, Invisible), lung cancer.
- February 12 – Erick Garza, 56, Mexican keyboard player (Grupo Bronco)
- February 24 – Pery Ribeiro, 74, Brazilian singer, myocardial infarction.
- April 14 – Pedro Arroyo, Puerto Rican radio programmer, creator of "National Day of Salsa" in Puerto Rico
- May 7 – Sergio Mihanovich, 74, Argentine jazz pianist, singer and composer
- May 10 – Junior Gonzalez, 63, Puerto Rican salsa singer
- May 31 – Horacio "Chivo" Borraro, 90, Argentine tenor sax and clarinet player
- June 6 – Estela Raval, Argentine singer
- June 12 – Adrián Otero, 53, Argentine singer
- June 22 – Nelson Schwenke, 55, Chilean singer and songwriter (Schwenke & Nilo)
- June 30 – Yomo Toro, 78, Puerto Rican cuatro player, kidney failure.
- July 4 – Homero Patrón, 61, Mexican arranger, producer, musician and composer
- July 13 – Leda Valladares, 92, Argentine singer, songwriter, musicologist and folklorist, and poet
- July 14 – Marcel Curuchet, 40, Uruguayan musician and composer (No Te Va Gustar)
- July 29 – Osvaldo Fattoruso, 64, Uruguayan musician (Los Shakers, Opa), cancer.
- August 5 – Chavela Vargas, 93, Costa Rican-born Mexican singer-songwriter, respiratory arrest.
- August 8 – Jairo Varela, 62, Founder and leader of Grupo Niche
- August 22 – Charles Flores, 41, Cuban bass player
- September 21 – José Curbelo, 95, Cuban-born American jazz musician and manager, heart failure.
- September 27 – Paquito Hechavarría, 73, Cuban pianist
- September 29:
- Eduardo Baptista Fernandez, 39, Mexican music publisher
- Hebe Camargo, 83, Brazilian television presenter, cardiac arrest.
- September 30 – José Luis "Choche" Villareal, 55, Mexican drummer for Grupo Bronco.
- October 22 – Norberto Kaminsky, Argentine producer
- October 31 – Gustavo Sánchez, 56, Latin American Idol judge
- November 4 – Valentin Velasco, 80, Mexican American founder of Balboa Records
- November 5 – Leonardo Favio, 74, Argentine singer, actor and director
- November 7 – Sylvia Cantarell, Mexican manager and producer
- November 18 – Emilio Aragón Bermúdez, 83, Spanish clown, accordionist, and singer.
- November 25 – Juan Carlos Calderón, 74, Spanish composer and conductor.
- December 9:
  - Arturo Rivera, Mexican publicist
  - Jenni Rivera, 43, American banda singer (plane crash)
- December 23 – Ema Elena Valdelamar, 87, Mexican songwriter
