= 2012 Premios Juventud =

9th Premios Juventud
- Date: July 19, 2012
- Location: Watsco Center in Coral Gables,, Florida
- Hosted by: Alicia Machado
- Website: Official Page

Television/radio coverage
- Network: Univision

The 9th Annual Premios Juventud (Youth Awards) were broadcast by Univision on July 19, 2012.

== Performers ==
Artist (s)	Song (s)
Flo Rida	Wild Ones Good Feeling
Frankie J	Tienes Que Creer En Mí
Kany Garcia	Que Te Vaya Mal
PeeWee	Live Your Life
Dyland y Lenny	Pegate Mas (Featuring Juan Magan)
David Bisbal	
Beatriz Luengo	Lengua
Victor Manuelle	Si Tú Me Besas, Ella Lo Que Quiere Es Salsa
Julio Voltio	Ella Lo Que Quiere Es Salsa
Jowell y Randy	Ella Lo Que Quiere Es Salsa
Pitbull	Back In Time
Leslie Grace	Will You Still Love Me Tomorrow
Vazquez Sounds	Rolling In The Deep
Matt Hunter	Mi Amor
Romeo Santos	La Diabla Magia Negra (Featuring La Mala Rodriguez)
Juanes	
Prince Royce	Close To You
Beto Cuevas	Quiero Creer (Featuring Flo Rida)
Belinda	En El Amor Hay Que Perdonar
3Ball MTY	Besos Al Aire (Featuring America Sierra & Smoky)
Espinoza Paz	
Chino y Nacho	Bebe Bonita (Featuring Jay Sean)
Jesse y Joy	¡Corre!
Eiza González	Te Acordarás De Mí
Gerardo Ortíz	Solo Vine A Despedirme

== Presenters ==
- Miguel Cotto
- Pamela Silva Conde
- Alejandro Berry
- Antonietta Collins
- Amaria Rocco
- Blanca Soto
- Da Zoo
- El Batallon
- Giselle Blondet
- Gustavo Galindo
- J Alvarez
- J Balvin
- Jorge Ramos
- Jose Ron
- Mane de la Parra
- Norka
- Rodner Figueroa
- Samo
- Sherlyn
- Vanessa de Roide

== Special awards ==
- Supernova: Fernando Colunga
- Idol of Generations Award: Wisin & Yandel
- The Best Dressed Award: Gerardo Ortiz & Belinda

== Winners and nominees ==
Bold denotes winner not revealed during the ceremony.

=== Music ===
La Combinacion Perfecta (The Perfect Combination)	¡Qué Rico se Mueve! (Best Moves)
**"Promise"** – (Romeo Santos & Usher): "El Verdadero Amor Perdona" – (Maná & Prince Royce); "Fuiste Tu" – (Ricardo Arjona & Gaby Moreno); "International Love" – (Pitbull & Chris Brown); "No al Alguacil" - (Gloria Trevi & Paulina Rubio); "Me Voy" – (Paulina Rubio & Espinoza Paz); "Ven Conmigo" – (Daddy Yankee & Prince Royce)	**Shakira**: Chayanne; Luis Fonsi; Pitbull; Ricky Martin; Romeo Santos
Voz del Momento (Voice of the Moment)	La Más Pegajosa (Catchiest Tune)
**Prince Royce**: Espinoza Paz; Gerardo Ortiz; Pitbull; Ricardo Arjona; Romeo Santos	**"Las Cosas Pequeñas"** – (Prince Royce): "Amor Confuso" – (Gerardo Ortiz); "Corre" – (Jesse & Joy); "Inténtalo" – (3Ball MTY); "Lovumba" – (Daddy Yankee); "Promise" – (Romeo Santos ft. Usher)
Lo Toco Todo (I Play This All the Time)	El Súper Tour (My Favorite Concert)
**Formula, Vol. 1** – (Romeo Santos): Entre Dios y El Diablo – (Gerardo Ortiz); Independiente – (Ricardo Arjona); Joyas Prestadas – (Jenni Rivera); Planet Pit – (Pitbull); Gloria – (Gloria Trevi); Tierra Firme – (Luis Fonsi)	**"Euphoria"** – (Enrique Iglesias, Pitbull & Prince Royce): "Drama y Luz" – (Maná); "Formula Vol. 1" – (Romeo Santos); "Música + Alma + Sexo" – (Ricky Martin); "Metamorfosis" – (Ricardo Arjona); "Tierra Firme" – (Luis Fonsi)
Canción Corta-venas (Best Ballad)	Mi Video Favorito (My Favorite Video)
**"Las Cosas Pequeñas"** – (Prince Royce): "Amor Confuso" – (Gerardo Ortiz); "Corre" – (Jesse & Joy); "Fuiste Tu" – (Ricardo Arjona ft. Gaby Moreno); "Promise" – (Romeo Santos ft. Usher); "Respira" – (Luis Fonsi)	**"Las Cosas Pequeñas"** – (Prince Royce): "Corre" – (Jesse & Joy); "Fuiste Tu" – (Ricardo Arjona ft. Gaby Moreno); "Lovumba" – (Daddy Yankee); "Mi Santa" – (Romeo Santos ft. Tomatito); "Promise" – (Romeo Santos ft. Usher)
Mi Ringtone Favorito (My Ringtone)	Mi Artista Regional Mexicano (Favorite Regional Mexican Artist)
**"Las Cosas Pequeñas"** – (Prince Royce): "Amor Confuso" – (Gerardo Ortiz); "Inténtalo" – (3Ball MTY); "International Love" – (Pitbull ft. Chris Brown); "Lovumba" – (Daddy Yankee); "Promise" – (Romeo Santos ft. Usher)	**Espinoza Paz**: Alejandro Fernández; Banda el Recodo; Gerardo Ortiz; Jenni Rivera; Pepe Aguilar
Mi Artista Rock (Favorite Rock Artist)	Mi Artista Pop (Favorite Pop Artist)
**Maná**: Alejandra Guzmán; Enrique Bunbury; Juanes; Moderatto; Panda	**Camila**: Enrique Iglesias; Luis Fonsi; Ricardo Arjona; Ricky Martin; Shakira
Mi Artista Tropical (Favorite Tropical Artist)	Mi Artista Urbano (Favorite Urban Artist)
**Prince Royce**: Chino y Nacho; Marc Anthony; Olga Tañón; Romeo Santos; Víctor Manuelle	**Pitbull**: Daddy Yankee; Don Omar; El Batallón; Tito El Bambino; Wisin y Yandel

=== Television ===
¡Está Buenísimo! (What a Hottie!)	Chica Que Me Quita el Sueño (Girl that takes the sleep away)
**David Zepeda** (Abismo de Pasión): Aarón Díaz (El Talismán); Carlos Ponce (Dos Hogares); Jorge Salinas (La Que No Podía Amar); José Ron (La Que No Podía Amar)	**Ana Brenda Contreras** (La Que No Podía Amar): Anahí (Dos Hogares); Angelique Boyer (Abismo de Pasíon); Blanca Soto (El Talismán); Sandra Echeverría (La Fuerza Del Destino)
Mejor Tema Novelero (Best Theme Novelero)
**"Día De Suerte"** – Alejandra Guzmán (Una Familia Con Suerte): "Cuando Me Enamoro" – Enrique Iglesias & Juan Luis Guerra (Cuando Me Enamoro); "Dividida" – Anahí (Dos Hogares); "Esa Hembra Es Mala" – Gloria Trevi (Teresa); "La Fuerza del Destino" – Marc Anthony & Sandra Echeverría (La Fuerza del Destino)

=== Movies ===
¡Qué Actorazo! (Can He Act or What?)	Actriz que se Roba la Pantalla (She Steals the Show)
**Antonio Banderas**: Demián Bichir; Diego Luna; Eugenio Derbez; Gael García Bernal	**Sofía Vergara**: Kate del Castillo; Penélope Cruz; Salma Hayek; Zoe Saldaña
Película Más Padre (Favorite Flick)
**Puss in Boots**: A Better Life; Blackthorn; Casa de Mi Padre; Jack and Jill

=== Sports ===
El Deportista de Alto Voltaje (Most Electrifying Guy Jock)	La nueva Promesa (The New Pledge)
**Javier "Chicharito" Hernández**: Alex Rodríguez; Guillermo Ochoa; JJ Barea; Lionel Messi	**Canelo Álvarez**: Alan Pulido; Carlos Fierro; Erick "El Cubo" Torres; Marco Fabián

=== Pop Culture ===
Siganme Los Buenos
(Follow Me, Good Ones)

**Prince Royce**

- Anahí
- Luis Fonsi
- Ricky Martin
- Thalia
