= Imaculada =

Imaculada may refer to:

- Imaculada, Paraíba, a municipality in the state of Paraíba, Brazil
- Imaculada (album), a 2021 album by Alice Caymmi
