= Gaijin Sentai =

Brazilian band

- Origin: Caraguatatuba, Brazil
- Genres: Anison; Tokuson; VGM; Pop rock; Hard rock; Heavy Metal
- Years active: 2006–present
- Labels: Colormark Music
- Members: Nordan Manz, Dani Mancz, Arilson Poli, Wagner Rodrigues, Marcus Dotta, Jefferson Amorim
- Past members: Kleber Amorim, Nando Nespoli, Fabio Max

Gaijin Sentai is a Brazilian band formed in 2006 in the city of Caraguatatuba. With Nordan Manz and Dani Mancz on vocals, guitarists Arilson Poli and Wagner Rodrigues, Alexandre Manz on bass, Jefferson Amorim on keyboards, and Marcus Dotta on drums, the band brings elements of hard rock and heavy metal to covers of anime and tokusatsu songs. They are quite known in the Japanese culture convention scene in Brazil, having participated in events all around the country, such as Anime Friends, CCXP and Anime Summit, and have performed in Japan, Europe and in various countries in Latin America.

Besides covers, the band composes original songs, having released two albums and partnerships with Japanese artists.

In 2008, they recorded the EP Jaguatimen vs. Sunrider, which had the participation of Eizo Sakamoto, great name of Japanese heavy metal, former Anthem, JAM Project and Animetal. Sakamoto also recorded the song Metaru Hiro. Both part of the album "OST".

In 2015, they began a partnership with Japanese label Colormark Music to release the single "Nunca se Renda" (it means "never surrender").

In 2021, the single Delorean was released featuring Robertinho de Recife and Yumi Matsuzawa, as part of the album “Transformação”. Matsuzawa also wrote the lyrics with the band, besides singing. On the same year, their version of Moonlight Densetsu, opening of Sailor Moon, was used by singer Alice Caymmi on her album Imaculada, with the translated title of "A Lenda da Luz da Lua".

== Discography ==
=== Singles/EPs ===
- 2008: Jaguatimen vs. Sunrider
- 2015: Nunca se Renda
- 2021: Delorean

=== Albums ===
- 2013: OST
- 2018: Transformação
