= Natiruts Reggae Power =

Live album by Natiruts
- Released: December 2006
- Recorded: September 12, 2006
- Venue: Credicard Hall, São Paulo, Brazil
- Genre: Reggae
- Length: 1:46:00
- Language: Portuguese
- Label: Raizama Records
- Director: Maurício Eça
- Producer: Alexandre Carlo, Daniel Felix, Patrick de Jongh

Natiruts chronology
Nossa Missão (2005)	Natiruts Reggae Power (2006)	Raçaman (2009)

Natiruts Reggae Power is the first live album and the first DVD by the Brazilian reggae band Natiruts released in December 2006 by Raizama Records.

Recorded at Credicard Hall in São Paulo on September 1, 2006, the album is a collection of the band's career, featuring some of its most popular songs, such as "Liberdade pra Dentro da Cabeça" and "Presente de Um Beija-Flor" and more recent songs like "Não Chore Meu Amor", "Quem Planta Preconceito" and "Quero Ser Feliz Também". The album includes a previously unreleased song "Natiruts Reggae Power" which was a hit in Brazil.

The album features Kiko Peres, who was the band's original guitarist in the tracks "A Cor" and "Meu Reggae é Roots".

== Track listing ==
=== Disc 1 ===
1. Natiruts Reggae Power (Sambaton)
2. Não Chore Meu Amor
3. Naticongo
4. Surfista do Lago Paranoá
5. Presente de Um Beija-Flor
6. Verbalize
7. Caraíva
8. Iluminar (literally Lighting, Illuminating)
9. Liberdade Pra Dentro da Cabeça
10. Em Paz
11. Leviatã
12. Palmares 1999
13. Quem Planta Preconceito
14. A Cor

=== Disc 2 ===
1. Meu Reggae é Roots ('My Reggae is Roots')
2. Eu e Ela (cover version 'Waiting in Vain' by Bob Marley)
3. Toca-Fogo
4. Forasteiro
5. Leve Com Você
6. Quero Ser Feliz Também
7. Andei Só
8. Deixa o Menino Jogar
9. O Carcará e a Rosa

=== DVD version ===
1. Natiruts Reggae Power (Sambaton)
2. Não Chore Meu Amor
3. Naticongo
4. Surfista do Lago Paranoá
5. Presente de Um Beija-Flor
6. Verbalize
7. Caraíva
8. Iluminar
9. Liberdade Pra Dentro da Cabeça
10. Em Paz
11. Leviatã
12. Palmares 1999
13. Quem Planta Preconceito
14. A Cor
15. Meu Reggae é Roots
16. Eu e Ela (citação: Waiting in Vain, de Bob Marley)
17. Toca-Fogo
18. Forasteiro
19. Leve Com Você
20. Quero Ser Feliz Também
21. Andei Só
22. Deixa o Menino Jogar
23. O Carcará e a Rosa

== Certifications ==
Region	Certification	Certified units/sales
Brazil (Pro-Música Brasil)	Gold	50,000^{‡}
^{‡} Sales+streaming figures based on certification alone.

== Personnel ==
=== Natiruts ===
- Alexandre Carlo: lead vocals, rhythm guitar
- Luís Maurício: bass guitar, backing vocals
- Juninho: drums

=== Guest musicians ===
- Mônica Agena: lead guitar
- Bruno Wambier: keys
- Denny Conceição: percussions
- Ludmila Mazzucatti: backing vocals
- Luciana Oliveira: backing vocals
- Alexandre Herrera: sax-tenor and flute
- André Mitsuoka: trombone
- Paulo Roberto Pizzulin: trumpet and clarinet
- Kiko Peres: guitar in "A Cor" e "Meu Reggae é Roots"
- Guigui Trotta: harmonica in "Forasteiro"
- Funkbuia: vocalist in "Toca-Fogo"
- Daniel Ganja Man: dubs and effects
