= Alice (Alice Caymmi album) =

Studio album by Alice Caymmi
- Released: January 19, 2018
- Genre: Pop, música popular brasileira
- Length: 26:23
- Label: Flecha de Prata Edições Musicais/Universal Music Group
- Producer: Barbara Ohana

Alice Caymmi chronology
Rainha dos Raios (2014)	Alice (2018)	Dizem Que Sou Louca (2019)

Singles from Alice
- 1. "Inocente" Released: 8 December 2017; 2. "Eu Te Avisei" Released: 19 January 2018; 3. "Sozinha" Released: 12 June 2018

Alice is the third album by Brazilian singer Alice Caymmi, released on 19 January 2018. It was produced by Barbara Ohana and sees the singer working on a more pop-oriented sound.

It was ranked as the 46th best Brazilian album of 2018 by the Brazilian edition of Rolling Stone magazine.

== Album cover and title ==
The album cover was created by Daryan Dornelles. It depicts Caymmi dressed as a bride, submerged and tied up with the shibari technique, representing the "pure and profane". The cover also features a heart and her name in neon lights, but with a turned off "Caymmi".

== Song information ==
Rapper Rincon Sapiência was invited to guest sing on "Inimigos", in which he is also a co-composer. The song talks about a common universe for artists, as mentioned by Caymmi: "When your art simply meets truly bad obstacles and people".

The album features a song co-written with Ana Carolina: "Inocente". The duo went to Itaipava, Rio de Janeiro to compose it, with the idea of writing a romantic song. It was released as the album's first single on 8 December 2017. She comments:

I assumed a romantic posture, artistically and politically. I thought about how I was before my first sinister broken heart. I was light and I can recover that essence. We went from total apathy to a time of conflicts. This weight has to end. And then more light, white and laces came in.

The guest performance of Pabllo Vittar on "Eu Te Avisei" came up after Caymmi, Ohana and Pablo Bispo finished the song, which features a R&B base in its choir. It talks about love in a melancholic, introspective way. It was released as the album's second single on the same day of its release and its video was recorded on 15 January 2018, at the RebobiNights party in São Paulo.

=== Lyrical themes ===
The opening track expresses a sense of gaslighting that Caymmi was feeling around the time of the song's writing. "What's My Name" was written by Moacir Santos after he moved to Los Angeles and realized nobody was able to pronounce his name; the track expresses feelings of solitude and other struggles faced when one moves abroad. "Vin" speaks about female freedom, "Inimigos" about competition and disputes in the show business, "Inocente" about love delusions, and "Sozinha" about being self-sufficient.

== Tracks ==
No.	Title	Writer(s)	Length
1.	"Spiritual"	Alice Caymmi	3:32
2.	"A Estação" (The Station)	Carlinhos Rufino	3:05
3.	"What's My Name (Oduduá)"	Moacir Santos	2:21
4.	"Vin"	Caymmi, Barbara Ohana, Pablo Bispo, Sergio Santos	2:27
5.	"Inimigos" (Enemies; featuring Rincon Sapiência)	Caymmi, Ohana, Rincon Sapiência	2:41
6.	"Inocente" (Innocent)	Caymmi, Ana Carolina	3:22
7.	"Agora" (Now; cover of "Ancora, ancora, ancora", by Mina)	Cristiano Malgioglio, Gian Pietro Felisatti	3:29
8.	"Sozinha" (Alone)	Arthur Marques	2:45
9.	"Eu Te Avisei" (I Warned You; featuring Pabllo Vittar)	Caymmi, Ohana, Bispo	2:38
Total length:			26:23
