= Mi Amigo El Príncipe =

Studio album by Cristian Castro
- Released: November 1, 2011
- Recorded: 2010 The Hit Factory Criteria; Miami, Florida
- Genre: Latin pop
- Language: Spanish
- Label: Universal Music Latino
- Producer: Rafael Perez-Botija, José José

Cristian Castro chronology
Viva el príncipe (2010)	Mi Amigo El Príncipe (2011)	Celebrando Al Príncipe (2012)

Singles from Mi Amigo El Príncipe
- 1. "Lo Dudo" Released: September 27, 2011

Mi Amigo El Príncipe (My Friend The Prince) is the fourteenth studio album by Mexican pop singer Cristian Castro by Universal Music Latino. The album is follow-up to Viva el príncipe in which he pays a tribute to José José whom Castro considers his musical idol. The album consists of ten tracks. As with the previous album, Rafael Pérez-Botija, who wrote songs and produced albums for José José in the past, produced the album.

== Track listing ==
- Confirmed by Allmusic.

No.	Title	Writer(s)	Length
1.	"Lo Dudo"	Manuel Alejandro, Ana Magdalena	4:24
2.	"Preso"	Rafael Pérez Botija	3:23
3.	"Desesperado"	Rafael Pérez Botija, Maria Enriqueta Ramos Nunez	4:19
4.	"Gotas de Fuego"	Ramon Farran	5:03
5.	"Insaciable Amante"	Camilo Blanes	4:05
6.	"Tu Primera Vez"	Jose Maria Napoleon	4:40
7.	"Buenos Días Amor"	Juan Carlos Calderon	4:00
8.	"Buscando una Sonrisa"	Jonathan Zarzosa Escobar, Pedro Soria	3:26
9.	"Me Basta"	Rafael Perez Botija	4:22
10.	"Vamos a Darnos Tiempo"	Alejandro Jaen	5:04

Deluxe Edition CD/DVD Disc 1
No.	Title	Writer(s)	Length
11.	"Payaso"	Rafael Pérez Botija, Maria Enriqueta Ramos Nunez	3:14
12.	"Amnesia"	Chico Novarro, Dino Ramos	4:01
13.	"Ahora No"	Juan Gabriel	2:43
14.	"Será"	Manuel Alejandro, Ana Magdalena	4:03

Deluxe Edition CD/DVD Disc 2
No.	Title	Writer(s)	Length
1.	"Lo Dudo"	Manuel Alejandro, Ana Magdalena	4:24
2.	"Preso"	Rafael Pérez Botija	3:23
3.	"Desesperado"	Rafael Pérez Botija, Maria Enriqueta Ramos Nunez	4:19
4.	"Tu Primera Vez"	Jose Maria Napoleon	4:40
5.	"Buenos Días Amor"	Juan Carlos Calderon	4:00
6.	"Me Basta"	Rafael Perez Botija	4:22
7.	"Amnesia"	Chico Novarro, Dino Ramos	4:01

== Chart performance ==
Chart (2011)	Peak position
Mexican Albums Chart	2
U.S. Billboard 200	57
U.S. Billboard Top Latin Albums	1
U.S. Billboard Latin Pop Albums	1

== Certifications ==
Region	Certification	Certified units/sales
Mexico (AMPROFON)	Platinum+Gold	90,000^{^}
^{^} Shipments figures based on certification alone.

== See also ==
- 2011 in Latin music
- List of number-one Billboard Latin Albums from the 2010s
- List of number-one Billboard Latin Pop Albums of 2011
