= Viva el Príncipe =

Studio album by Cristian Castro
- Released: 30 November 2010
- Recorded: August 2010; The Hit Factory Criteria; Miami, Florida
- Genre: Latin pop
- Length: 44:57
- Language: Spanish
- Label: Universal Music Latino
- Producer: Rafael Pérez-Botija

Cristian Castro chronology
El Culpable Soy Yo (2009)	Viva el Príncipe (2010)	Mi Amigo El Príncipe (2011)

Singles from Viva el Príncipe
- 1. "La Nave del Olvido" Released: 28 September 2010

Viva el Príncipe (English: Long Live the Prince) is the thirteenth studio album by Mexican recording artist Cristian Castro, released on 30 November 2010 by Universal Music Latino. It is a tribute album to Mexican singer José José, Castro's musical idol. The album was produced by Rafael Pérez-Botija who also produced for José José. Viva el Príncipe covers twelve songs by José José and includes a poem recited by Castro's idol. Recording took place in August 2010 at The Hit Factory Criteria in Miami, Florida.

To promote the recording, Castro released "La Nave del Olvido", which peaked at No. 48 on the Billboard Hot Latin Songs chart. Castro toured for the release in United States, Latin America and Spain. The album became successful in Mexico and the United States where it topped both the Mexican and Billboard Latin album charts. It was certified diamond by the Asociación Mexicana de Productores de Fonogramas y Videogramas (AMPROFON) in Mexico and double platinum (Latin field) by the Recording Industry Association of America (RIAA) in the United States. In South America, it peaked at No. 5 on the Argentine Chamber of Phonograms and Videograms Producers (CAPIF) album chart and received gold certifications in Colombia and Venezuela. It had sold over 800,000 copies worldwide as of November 2011.

Viva el Príncipe received a positive review from David Jeffries of Allmusic praising Botija's production and Castro's vocal delivery. It earned a negative review from an editor of Terra Networks who felt that the album did not add anything to the originals. The album received a nomination for a Latin Grammy, two Billboard Latin Music Awards nominations, and an Oye! award. The success led to a 2011 release of more José José songs titled Mi Amigo El Príncipe.

== Background ==
Viva el Príncipe is a tribute album to José José, who was involved with the direction of the recording.

The project for Viva el Príncipe began in 2008 after Castro, who was one of the selected artists, interpreted one of José's songs during a tribute concert. José believed that it was the right time for Castro to record a cover album with his songs and recommended that he seek the help of Rafael Pérez-Botija and Chucho Ferrer, who were responsible for producing José's albums. Castro recalled growing up in the same neighborhood with José, who often invited him over for parties and studied with his children in the same college. When he heard José's song "La Navel del Olvideo" for first time, Castro said: "I promised to be a singer someday and to sing ballads. José José is my musical father and biggest inspiration". Castro expressed hope that the album would allow José's songs to be heard by a newer generation. The album was officially revealed by Castro alongside José after his concert in Argentina. The title of the recording is a reference to José's honorary title "The Prince of Song" ("El Príncipe de la Canción").

== Recording and production ==
The album was recorded in August 2010 at The Hit Factory Criteria in Miami, Florida, produced by Botija. Along with Botija, the album includes arrangers Angel "Cucco" Peña and Jorge Calandrelli. The album covers ten of José's most recognized works such as "La Navel del Olvido", "El Triste", and "Gavilan o Paloma". "Lo Pasado, Pasado" features a duet with José José using the original recording. The album contains "Poema al Cantante" recited by José. In the poem, José conveys that the singer cannot live if he cannot sing ("Ya no podrá vivir, si ya no canta"); an allusion to losing his singing voice from the effects of alcoholism.

Castro was initially disappointed with the project as he did not want to solely imitate José's vocals, Ferrer's absence and his desire to record Jose's lesser known songs. According to Castro, it was the decisions of the executive producers of his record label, Universal Music Latino, to only have Botija produce the album and to record José José's more recognized songs. He later retracted his statement, commending Botija and referred to the disc as his best, only lamenting he could not record José's lesser known songs. José expressed satisfaction with the result.

== Promotion ==
Cristian Castro "La Nave del Olvido" (2010)
A sample of Castro's cover of "La Nave del Olvido" which was released as the lead single for the album. According to Castro, the original recording influenced Castro to become a balladeer after listening to it the first time.

To promote the album, "La Nave del Olvido" was selected as the lead single from the album and was released on 28 September 2010. It peaked at No. 48 on the Billboard Hot Latin Songs chart and No. 22 on the Billboard Latin Pop Songs chart. The music video was directed by Ricardo Moreno and filmed in Los Angeles. Three promotional singles were released on iTunes: Amor, Amor, Volcán, and Mi Niña. The standard track listing contains ten tracks and the poem. The deluxe edition contains two additional songs, a cover of "Gracias" and "Mi Niña" and a DVD which includes Castro performing each song at The Hit Factory Criteria and the music video for "La Nave del Olvido".

=== Tour ===
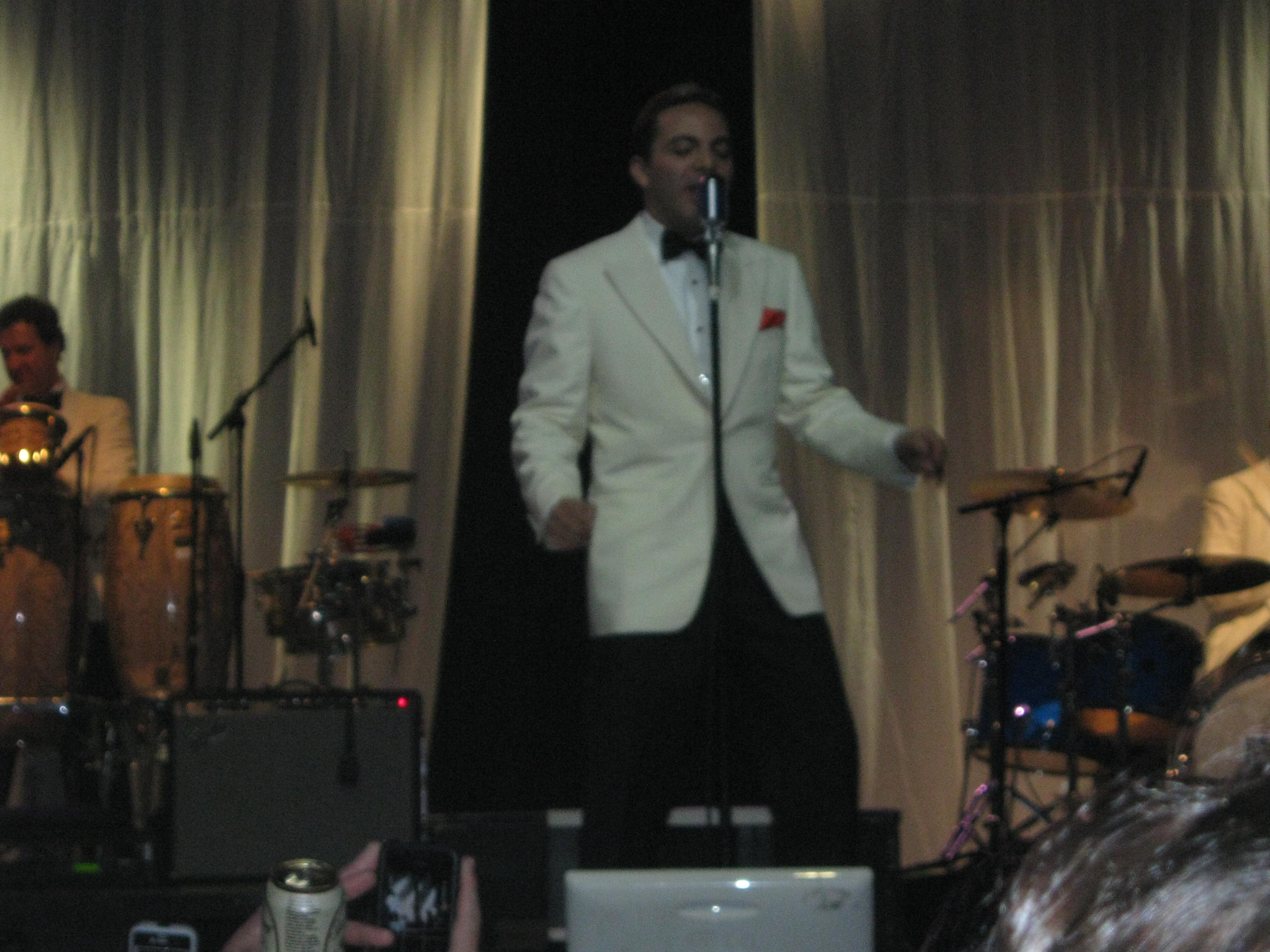
Cristian Castro performing at the House of Blues in Orlando, Florida during his "Viva el Príncipe Tour"

On 2 June 2011, Castro announced the "Viva el Príncipe Tour" consisting of 121 shows including the United States and twelve countries in Latin America. The tour began in Mexico where he performed in Guadalajara on 24 June 2011, and sang in Tabasco, Jalisco, and Puebla. During the concert in the National Auditorium he was accompanied by José José and his parents Manuel Valdés and Verónica Castro. On 28 July 2011, Castro began the tour's US leg in Chicago, Illinois, performing in Texas, California, Florida and Puerto Rico. The tour continued on to South America where Castro performed in Chile, Argentina, Bolivia, Peru, Ecuador and Colombia. Castro also performed in Spain and mentioned the difficulty of promoting in the country, as ballads are generally not well-received on radio stations.

In the first part of the show, Castro performed songs from the disc sporting a white tuxedo. In the second he performed hits from his earlier career.

== Commercial reception ==
The album was released on 30 November 2010 worldwide. In Mexico, the album spent fifteen weeks on top of the Top 100 Mexico chart. It was ranked as 2011's third best-selling album in Mexico and was certified diamond by AMPROFON for shipping 300,000 copies.

In the United States, it debuted at No. 157 on the Billboard 200 and No. 2 on both the Billboard Top Latin Albums and Billboard Latin Pop Albums charts selling over 7,000 copies its first week. The album reached No. 1 on the Top Latin Albums and Latin Pop Albums charts in the week of 29 January 2011 succeeding Shakira's album Sale el Sol where it spent seven weeks on top of Latin Albums and ten weeks on top of Latin Pop Albums. It peaked at No. 49 on the Billboard 200 on the week of 21 March 2011.

On the Billboard year-end charts of 2011, the album ranked as the second-best selling Latin album of the year after Prince Royce's eponymous album and the best-selling Latin pop album of the year. It was certified double platinum (Latin field) by the RIAA for shipments of 200,000 copies in United States. In Spain, it peaked at No. 44 on the Productores de Música de España album chart. In South America, Viva el Príncipe peaked at No. 5 on the Argentine Chamber of Phonograms and Videograms Producers pop charts and received gold certifications in Colombia by the Asociación Colombiana de Productores de Fonogramas and in Venezuela by the Association of Venezuelan Phonograph Producers. As of November 2011, the album had sold over 800,000 copies worldwide.

== Critical reception and accolades ==
David Jeffries of Allmusic gave the album a positive review believing that José José's "spirit fills the album" and commended Botija for his role in the production and Castro for bringing "the sense of tradition as he delivers this material with respect". He observed that it doesn't stop Castro from "pouring his heart into the songs" and perceived mimicry as a non-issue. Jeffries closed the review affirming that the album "winds up a tribute that will please fans of either artist". An editor of Terra Networks gave the album a negative review. Although the editor complimented Castro's ability to imitate José José's music, he felt that the audience were better off listening to the original recordings as Castro did not take the risk of adapting the tunes to his own style.

At the 12th Latin Grammy Awards, Castro received a nomination for Best Male Pop Vocal Album, which went to Franco De Vita for En Primera Fila. At the 2012 Latin Billboard Music Awards, the album received two nominations for Latin Album of the Year and Latin Pop Album of the Year losing the first award to Prince Royce's eponymous album and the second award to Drama y Luz by Maná. At the 2012 Billboard Music Awards, it was nominated Latin Album of the Year but lost to Formula, Vol. 1 by Romeo Santos. At the 2012 Mexican Oye! Awards, it received an award for Male Pop Album of the Year and a nomination for Album of the Year.

== Legacy ==
A follow-up to Viva el Príncipe was announced by Castro on 13 September 2011 titled Mi Amigo El Príncipe. As with its predecessor, Mi Amigo El Príncipe was produced by Botija. The disc was released on 1 November 2011. A two-disc compilation titled Viva El Príncipe: Edición Especial, Vol. 1 & 2 was released on 7 February 2012 with the tracks from both albums. Another compilation album featuring covers of José's songs was released in 2012 titled Celebrando Al Príncipe which contains thirteen previously recorded songs and two covers of "Mi Vida" and "Pero Me Hiciste Tuyo". Sony Music Latin released a greatest hits albums featuring José's and Castro's songs titled El Romántico & El Príncipe in 2012.

== Track listing ==
No.	Title	Writer(s)	Length
1.	"Lo Pasado, Pasado (featuring José José)"	Juan Gabriel	4:03
2.	"La Nave del Olvido"	Dino Ramos	3:53
3.	"Amor, Amor"	Rafael Pérez Botija	5:03
4.	"Lo Que No Fué No Será"	Jose Maria Napoleon	3:48
5.	"Gavilán o Paloma"	Botija	4:46
6.	"Amar y Querer"	Manuel Alejandro	4:22
7.	"Si Me Dejas Ahora"	Camilo Blanes	4:48
8.	"Volcán"	Botija	4:50
9.	"Almohada"	Adan Torres	4:02
10.	"El Triste"	Roberto Cantoral	4:37
11.	"Poema al Cantante (recited by José José)"		0:54

Deluxe Edition CD/DVD Disc 1
No.	Title	Writer(s)	Length
11.	"Gracias"	Botija	3:56
12.	"Mi Niña"	Scottie Scott	4:10
Total length:			53:00

Deluxe Edition CD/DVD Disc 2
No.	Title	Writer(s)	Length
1.	"Lo Pasado, Pasado"	Gabriel
2.	"La Nave del Olvido"	Ramos
3.	"Amor, Amor"	Botija
4.	"Lo Que No Fue No Será"	Napoleon
5.	"Gavilán o Paloma"	Botija
6.	"Amar y Querer"	Alejandro
7.	"Si Me Dejas Ahora"	Blanes
8.	"Volcán"	Botija
9.	"Almohada"	Torres
10.	"El Triste"	Cantoral
11.	"La Nave del Olvido (Music video)"	Ramos

== Credits and personnel ==
The following credits are adapted from Allmusic and the album liner notes.

Arrangements

- Angel "Cucco" Peña - "El Triste", "Mi Niña", "Almohada", "Lo Pasado, Pasado"
- Jorge Calandrelli - "Gavilán o Paloma", "Si Me Dejas Ahora", "La Nave del Olvido"
- Julio Reyes Copello - "Volcán", "Gracias", "Lo Que No Fué No Será"
- Rafael Pérez-Botija - string arrangements for "Volcán" and "Gracias"

Audio engineering

- Javier Garza
- Steve Sykes
- Frank Socorro
- Carlos Álvarez
- Héctor Iván Rosa
- Santos Santiago
- Charles Wakeman

Bass guitar

- Julio Hernández
- Kevin Axt

Drums

- Lee Levin,
- John Robinson

Guitar

- Dan Warner
- Michael Thomson
- René Toledo
- Dean Parks,
- Juan Pablo Vega

Keyboard instrument

- Fernando Muscolo
- Gabriel Saientz

Mastering

- Gabriel Wallach - Mastering

Percussion

- David Marrero
- Jose Edgardo Santiago

Piano

- Milton Sesentón
- Greg Mathieson
- Jim Cox
- Jorge Calandrelli
- Julio Reyes Copello

Strings

- Miami Symphonic Strings

Trombone

- Rafi Torres
- Jorge Díaz
- Miguel Rivera

Trumpet

- Luis Aquino
- Angie Machado

Vocals

- Cristian Castro
- Chris Clansdrop
- José José ("Poema al Cantante")
- Susan Moyer
- Claudio Jaffe
- Ross Harbaugh
- Jonah Kim

Viola

- Rebecca Diderrich
- Chauncey Patterson - Viola
- Scott O'Donnell - Viola
- Deena Shapiro - Viola
- Karen Hebermehl

Violin

- Alfredo Oliva - Concert master
- Huifang Chen
- Monica Cheversan
- Adam Diderrich
- John DiPuccio
- Scott Flavin
- Brian Fox
- Charles Hardt
- Dina Kostic
- Marcia Littley
- Jaime Mansilla
- Evija Ozolins
- Antony Seepersa

== Chart performance ==
=== Weekly charts ===
Chart (2010)	Peak position
Argentina (CAPIF)	5
Mexico (Top 100 Mexico)	1
Chart (2011)	Peak position
Spain (PROMUSICAE)	44
US Billboard 200	49
US Top Latin Albums (Billboard)	1
US Latin Pop Albums (Billboard)	1

=== Year-end charts ===
Chart (2011)	Position
Mexico (Top 100 Mexico)	3
US Latin Albums (Billboard)	2
US Latin Pop Albums (Billboard)	1

=== Certifications ===
Region	Certification	Certified units/sales
Colombia	Gold	
Mexico (AMPROFON)	Diamond	300,000^{^}
United States (RIAA)	2× Platinum (Latin)	200,000^{^}
Venezuela	Gold	
^{^} Shipments figures based on certification alone.

== See also ==
- 2010 in Latin music
- List of number-one albums of 2010 (Mexico)
- List of number-one albums of 2011 (Mexico)
- List of number-one Billboard Latin Albums from the 2010s
- List of number-one Billboard Latin Pop Albums of 2011
