= Dizem Que Sou Louca =

EP by Alice Caymmi
- Released: 11 January 2019
- Recorded: 2017
- Genres: MPB; indietronica; trap music; funk carioca
- Length: 11:33
- Label: Flecha de Prata Edições Musicais (under license by Universal Music International)

Alice Caymmi chronology
Alice (2018)	Dizem Que Sou Louca (2019)	Electra (2019)

Dizem Que Sou Louca ("They Say I'm Crazy") is an EP by Brazilian singer Alice Caymmi, released on 11 January 2019. It consists of four different versions of "Louca" ("Crazy"), a song she had released in 2017 and that was part of the soundtrack of superseries Onde Nascem os Fortes, by Rede Globo: a remastered version, an acoustic version, a remixed version and an a cappella version.

The EP was released with a show at Sesc Pompeia, in São Paulo, on the following day of the release's arrival on digital platforms.

== Background ==
The track was originally recorded by Mexican singer Thalía on her 2005 album El Sexto Sentido, but Caymmi actually first heard it in a cover version by Banda Kitara. Originally, the song would be the closer of her 2018 album Alice, but it ended up excluded from the final track listing and would only be added back as a bonus track of the album's 2019 re-release, in its a cappella version, which was exclusively released prior to the EP at Red Bull's website. "Louca" would close the album so that it would contrast with the opening track "Spiritual", which opening lines say "I'm not getting crazy".

The idea of releasing the track was matured throughout 2018, with the original plan having the EP as a Christmas gift for the fans. However, that did not happen. Nevertheless, the idea of allowing fans "to see different ways of making the same song also, of choosing my favorite form of them", as the singer put it, was kept. In another interview, she said:

I think my albums have many romantic ballads and stuff, but my shows have been featuring many dancing songs, many fun and dancing songs. The audience was missing having those songs at home, in order to dance... And it's the turning point before a new period, because it became clear that new things were approaching, and everything would have a new face.

About the lyrics, Caymmi said:

I think this is the topic I most exploit in my career. Even more than the abusive relationship issue, is the Glaslighting [sic] aspect, right? Saying women are uncontrollable, mystical, out-of-reality beings and diminish everything they say. This is a very strong issue in my life and I brought it to music, mainly to that track.

The acoustic version features Mateo Piracés-Ugarte, from the band Francisco, el Hombre, and it received a clip, which exclusively debuted at the Tenho Mais Discos Que Amigos! website and was recorded at YouTube Space, in Rio de Janeiro. About the partnership, Piracés-Ugarte said:

I've never been the best instrumentalist, the best producer nor the most talented. But I was lucky to be in the right place at the right time. I'm very dedicated, and Alice's invitation came for me to re-arrange and create an acoustic version. I used my way of playing the acoustic guitar and I was scared! A great responsibility. Fortunately, she was willing to accept new things and different Latin rhythm.

The remixed version was created by DJ J Brasil. By the time of the EP's release, she was already sure of a future release for the same year - it came in May, titled Electra.

The EP cover features a photograph by Rafael Di Celio, with art by Camila Camargo and art direction by Caymmi herself.

== Track listing ==
All tracks are written by Estéfano and José Luis Pagán.

No.	Title	Length
1.	"Louca" (remastered version)	2:41
2.	"Louca" (acoustic version (featuring Mateo Piracés-Ugarte))	3:41
3.	"Louca" (remixed version)	2:06
4.	"Louca" (a cappella version)	3:05
Total length:		11:33
