= Povo Brasileiro =

Studio album by Natiruts
- Released: 1999
- Genre: Reggae; MPB
- Language: Portuguese
- Label: EMI
- Producer: Liminha

Natiruts chronology
Nativus (1998)	Povo Brasileiro (1999)	Verbalize (2001)

Povo Brasileiro is the second studio album by the Brazilian Reggae band Natiruts. The album was produced by Liminha. Povo Brasileiro has been certified gold by the Associação Brasileira dos Produtores de Discos (ABPD), for selling 100,000 copies.

== Track listing ==
Povo Brasileiro — Brazilian standard version
No.	Title	Length
1.	"O Carcará E A Rosa"
2.	"Meu Reggae É "Roots""
3.	"Proteja-se e Lute"
4.	"Eu e Ela"
5.	"Palmares 1999"
6.	"A Cor"
7.	"Em Paz"
8.	"Praia Dos Golfinhos"
9.	"Pode Ser"
10.	"Pedras Escondidas"
11.	"Cavaleiros Azuis"
12.	"Una Vez Más"
13.	"Povo Brasileiro"
14.	"Forasteiro"

== Certifications ==
Region	Certification	Certified units/sales
Brazil (Pro-Música Brasil)	Gold	100,000^{*}
^{*} Sales figures based on certification alone.
