= List of number-one singles of 2013 (Spain) =

This lists the singles that reached number one on the Spanish Promusicae sales and airplay charts in 2013. Total sales correspond to the data sent by regular contributors to sales volumes and by digital distributors. There is a two-day difference between the reporting period from sales outlets and from radio stations. For example, the report period for the first full week of 2013 ended on January 6 for sales and on January 4 for airplay.

== Chart history ==
| Week | Top-selling | | | | Week | Most airplay | | | |
| Week | Issue date | Artist(s) | Song | Reference(s) | Week | Issue date | Artist(s) | Song | Reference(s) |
|---|---|---|---|---|---|---|---|---|---|
| 1 | January 6 | PSY | "Gangnam Style" | | 1 | January 4 | Rihanna | "Diamonds" | |
| 2 | January 13 | PSY | "Gangnam Style" | | 2 | January 11 | Rihanna | "Diamonds" | |
| 3 | January 20 | PSY | "Gangnam Style" | | 3 | January 18 | Alicia Keys | "Girl on Fire" | |
| 4 | January 27 | PSY | "Gangnam Style" | | 4 | January 25 | Rihanna | Diamonds | |
| 5 | February 3 | PSY | "Gangnam Style" | | 5 | February 1 | Rihanna | Diamonds | |
| 6 | February 10 | Pablo Alborán | El Beso | | 6 | February 8 | Bruno Mars | "Locked Out of Heaven" | |
| 7 | February 17 | Pablo Alborán | El Beso | | 7 | February 15 | Bruno Mars | "Locked Out of Heaven" | |
| 8 | February 24 | will.i.am (feat. Britney Spears) | "Scream & Shout" | | 8 | February 22 | Bruno Mars | "Locked Out of Heaven" | |
| 9 | March 3 | Malú (feat. Pablo Alborán) | "Vuelvo a verte" | | 9 | March 1 | Bruno Mars | "Locked Out of Heaven" | |
| 10 | March 10 | Yandar & Yostin (feat. Andy Rivera) | "Te Pintaron Pajaritos" | | 10 | March 8 | Bruno Mars | "Locked Out of Heaven" | |
| 11 | March 17 | Yandar & Yostin (feat. Andy Rivera) | "Te Pintaron Pajaritos" | | 11 | March 15 | Bruno Mars | "Locked Out of Heaven" | |
| 12 | March 24 | Pink | "Try" | | 12 | March 22 | Bruno Mars | "Locked Out of Heaven" | |
| 13 | March 31 | Pink | "Try" | | 13 | March 29 | Bruno Mars | "Locked Out of Heaven" | |
| 14 | April 7 | Pink | "Try" | | 14 | April 5 | Bruno Mars | "Locked Out of Heaven" | |
| 15 | April 14 | Pitbull (feat. Christina Aguilera) | "Feel This Moment" | | 15 | April 12 | Pink | "Try" | |
| 16 | April 21 | Pitbull (feat. Christina Aguilera) | "Feel This Moment" | | 16 | April 19 | Pink | "Try" | |
| 17 | April 28 | Pitbull (feat. Christina Aguilera) | "Feel This Moment" | | 17 | April 26 | Bruno Mars | "Locked Out of Heaven" | |
| 18 | May 5 | Pitbull (feat. Christina Aguilera) | "Feel This Moment" | | 18 | May 3 | Melendi | "Tu Jardín con Enanitos" | |
| 19 | May 12 | Pablo Alborán | "Quién" | | 19 | May 10 | Melendi | "Tu Jardín con Enanitos" | |
| 20 | May 19 | Daft Punk (feat. Pharrell Williams) | "Get Lucky" | | 20 | May 17 | Melendi | "Tu Jardín con Enanitos" | |
| 21 | May 26 | Daft Punk (feat. Pharrell Williams) | "Get Lucky" | | 21 | May 24 | Pink | "Try" | |
| 22 | June 2 | Daft Punk (feat. Pharrell Williams) | "Get Lucky" | | 22 | May 31 | Pink | "Try" | |
| 23 | June 9 | Dani Martín | "Cero" | | 23 | June 7 | Pink | "Try" | |
| 24 | June 16 | Dani Martín | "Cero" | | 24 | June 14 | Dani Martín | "Cero" | |
| 25 | June 23 | Dani Martín | "Cero" | | 25 | June 21 | Dani Martín | "Cero" | |
| 26 | June 30 | Dani Martín | "Cero" | | 26 | June 28 | Dani Martín | "Cero" | |
| 27 | July 7 | Dani Martín | "Cero" | | 27 | July 5 | James Arthur | "Impossible" | |
| 28 | July 14 | Dani Martín | "Cero" | | 28 | July 12 | Dani Martín | "Cero" | |
| 29 | July 21 | Daft Punk (feat. Pharrell Williams) | "Get Lucky" | | 29 | July 19 | Dani Martín | "Cero" | |
| 30 | July 28 | Daft Punk (feat. Pharrell Williams) | "Get Lucky" | | 30 | July 26 | Dani Martín | "Cero" | |
| 31 | August 4 | Daft Punk (feat. Pharrell Williams) | "Get Lucky" | | 31 | August 2 | Dani Martín | "Cero" | |
| 32 | August 11 | Robin Thicke (feat. T.I. and Pharrell) | "Blurred Lines" | | 32 | August 9 | Dani Martín | "Cero" | |
| 33 | August 18 | Lady Gaga | "Applause" | | 33 | August 16 | Dani Martín | "Cero" | |
| 34 | August 25 | Avicii | "Wake Me Up" | | 34 | August 23 | Dani Martín | "Cero" | |
| 35 | September 1 | Avicii | "Wake Me Up" | | 35 | August 30 | Dani Martín | "Cero" | |
| 36 | September 8 | Avicii | "Wake Me Up" | | 36 | September 6 | Icona Pop | "I Love It" | |
| 37 | September 15 | Avicii | "Wake Me Up" | | 37 | September 13 | Avicii | "Wake Me Up" | |
| 38 | September 22 | Avicii | "Wake Me Up" | | 38 | September 20 | Avicii | "Wake Me Up" | |
| 39 | September 29 | Avicii | "Wake Me Up" | | 39 | September 27 | Passenger | "Let Her Go" | |
| 40 | October 6 | Avicii | "Wake Me Up" | | 40 | October 4 | Avicii | "Wake Me Up" | |
| 41 | October 13 | Avicii | "Wake Me Up" | | 41 | October 11 | Avicii | "Wake Me Up" | |
| 42 | October 20 | Por Ellas | "Color Esperanza" | | 42 | October 16 | Avicii | "Wake Me Up" | |
| 43 | October 27 | Por Ellas | "Color Esperanza" | | 43 | October 23 | Avicii | "Wake Me Up" | |
| 44 | November 3 | Lady Gaga | "Venus" | | 44 | October 30 | Avicii | "Wake Me Up" | |
| 45 | November 10 | Lady Gaga | "Dope" | | 45 | November 7 | Avicii | "Wake Me Up" | |
| 46 | November 17 | Miley Cyrus | "Wrecking Ball" | | 46 | November 14 | Avicii | "Wake Me Up" | |
| 47 | November 24 | One Direction | "Story of My Life" | | 47 | November 21 | Miley Cyrus | "Wrecking Ball" | |
| 48 | December 1 | Miley Cyrus | "Wrecking Ball" | | 48 | November 28 | Ellie Goulding | "Burn" | |
| 49 | December 8 | Miley Cyrus | "Wrecking Ball" | | 49 | December 5 | Ellie Goulding | "Burn" | |
| 50 | December 15 | Miley Cyrus | "Wrecking Ball" | | 50 | December 12 | Miley Cyrus | "Wrecking Ball" | |
| 51 | December 22 | Kiko Rivera | "Así Soy Yo" | | 51 | December 19 | Miley Cyrus | "Wrecking Ball" | |
| 52 | December 29 | One Direction | "Story of My Life" | | 52 | December 26 | Miley Cyrus | "Wrecking Ball" | |
