= Vuelvo a verte =

Single by Malú featuring Pablo Alborán

from the album Dual
- Released: November 2012
- Recorded: 2012
- Genre: Pop
- Length: 3:41
- Label: Sony Music
- Songwriter: Pablo López
- Producer: Armando Ávila

Pablo Alborán singles chronology
"Tanto" (2012)	"Vuelvo a verte" (2012)	"El Beso" (2012)

Music video
- "Vuelvo a verte" on YouTube

"Vuelvo a verte" (English: Return to see you) is a song recorded by the Spanish singer-songwriters Malú featuring Pablo Alborán. The song was released in November 2012 and peaked at number 1 on the Spanish Singles Chart in March 2013.

The song won "Best Spanish Song" at Los Premios 40 Principales 2013 awards.

== Music video ==
The music video for "Vuelvo a verte" was released on 9 June 2013.

== Track listing ==
Digital download
No.	Title	Length
1.	"Vuelvo a verte"	3:41

== Chart performance ==
=== Weekly charts ===
Chart (2012/13)	Peak position
Spain (PROMUSICAE)	1

=== Year-end charts ===
End Of Year (2013)	Peak position
Spain (PROMUSICAE)	20

== Release history ==
Region	Date	Format	Label
Spain	November 2012	Digital download	Sony Music Spain

== See also ==
- List of number-one singles of 2013 (Spain)
