= Imaculada (album) =

Studio album by Alice Caymmi
- Released: 15 October 2021
- Studio: Rodrigo Gorky's studio in São Paulo
- Genre: Pop; alternative pop
- Length: 25:54
- Language: Portuguese
- Label: Rainha dos Raios; Brabo Music
- Producer: Alice Caymmi; Vivian Kuczynski

Alice Caymmi chronology
| Electra (2019) | Imaculada (2021) |

Singles from Imaculada
- 1. "Serpente" Released: 15 October 2021

Imaculada is the fifth album by Brazilian singer Alice Caymmi, released on 15 October 2021. It was produced by Caymmi herself and Vivian Kuczynski.

Unlike the previous album, in which she covered other people's songs, in Imaculada almost every song is written by her. The album is the outcome of that was supposed to be a 2020 album announced in 2019, Elétrika.

== Concept ==
Speaking of the album, Caymmi said "abuse and forgiveness are topics that come to the fore", considered it autobiographical and saw it as "a reunion of Millennials with Generation Z". She considers it a pop album that "come more side-by-side with pop punk with a more intense rock touch".

About the album's title (Portuguese for "immaculate"), homonymous to its last track, she said the word has a dose of mystery: "How immaculate? Why? What's the connocation? It always depends on your point of view."

The cover is signed by Giovanni Bianco, who describes it as follows: "She [Caymmi] is depicted as a saint of a religiousness that doesn't exist. It's quite sensual. She's dressed up, but there's much transparency. People can see it as a Venus by Botticelli."

On the single "Serpente", Caymmi says "Eu tenho o direito de me expressar/ E viver do jeito que eu quiser viver" ("I have the right to express myself / And live how I want to live"); according to her, this message can be directed to several different people who caused her pain. The singer saw it as an autobiographical track, something she doesn't usually do. Also according to her, the "final message" of the album is of "forgiveness as an alternative, as choosing to live".

== Promotion ==
On 9 October 2021, Caymmi released a video for the single "Serpente", which she wrote with Maffalda, Rodrigo Gorky and Zebu. In the video, she appears half-naked in some scenes, something "liberating" for her, who though gaining 20 kilograms (44 lb) during the COVID-19 pandemic would spell the end of her career.

The album was announced on 11 October 2021 through the singer's social media accounts. It features several guest performers such as producer Kuczynski herself and Urias, Number Teddie and Mulú. According to Caymmi, having this team of guests resulted from living with several artists during the pandemic.

== Critical reception ==
Professional ratings
Review scores
| Source | Rating |
|---|---|
| Mauro Ferreira/G1 | 1/2 stars |

In his blog on G1, journalist Mauro Ferreira wrote a mixed review, saying the album is "far from being the carioca singer and composer's best one because it exposes the fragilities of the artist's authorial work. However, it may be Alice's most personal and sincere album." He pointed out the lyrics about overcoming and reaffirmation and also considered that in Imaculada "Alice Caymmi has the merits of being herself. It's a pity that the great singer is occluded by the majority of the 10 tracks (..)."

== Tracks ==
Imaculada track listing
| No. | Title | Writer(s) | Producers | Length |
|---|---|---|---|---|
| 1. | "Dentro da Minha Cabeça" (Inside My Head) | Alice Caymmi | Vivian Kuczynski, Maffalda, Caymmi | 2:51 |
| 2. | "Sentimentos" (Feelings (featuring Mulú)) | Caymmi, Mulú | Mulú | 2:32 |
| 3. | "Recíproco" (Reciprocal) | Caymmi, Junior Fernandes and Zebu | Zebu, Kuczynski, Caymmi | 2:41 |
| 4. | "Ninfomaníaca" (Nymphomaniac (featuring Urias, Number Teddie)) | Caymmi, Urias, Maffalda, Number Teddie | Maffalda, Kuczynski, Caymmi | 2:45 |
| 5. | "Todas as Noites" (Every Night (featuring Kuczynski)) | Caymmi, Kuczynski | Kuczynski, Caymmi | 2:56 |
| 6. | "A Lenda da Luz da Lua" (The Legend of the Moonlight ("Moonlight Densetsu" cover)) | Tetsuya Komoro, Kanako Oda / version by members of the band Gaijin Sentai | Kuczynski, Lucas Silveira, Caymmi | 2:25 |
| 7. | "Serpente" (Serpent) | Caymmi, Maffalda, Rodrigo Gorky, Zebu | Kuczynski, Caymmi | 2:08 |
| 8. | "Medusa" (Medusa) | Caymmi | Kuczynski, Maffalda, Caymmi | 2:18 |
| 9. | "Confidente" (Confident) | Caymmi, Zebu | Zebu, Kuczynski, Caymmi | 2:26 |
| 10. | "Imaculada" (Immaculate) | Caymmi | Kuczynski, Caymmi | 2:52 |
| Total length: | | | | 25:54 |

== Personnel ==
- Alice Caymmi – vocals on all tracks, guitar on "Medusa"
- Vivian Kuczynski – keyboards/synths and synth bass on all tracks except "Sentimentos" and "Ninfomaníaca"; guitar on "Dentro da Minha Cabeça", "Todas as Noites", "Serpente" and "Medusa"; bass on "Dentro da Minha Cabeça"; acoustic guitar and strings on "Medusa"
- Zebu – guitar, synth bass, keyboards and synths on "Recíproco" and "Confidente"; piano on "Confidente";
- Maffalda – keyboards, synths, synth bass and strings on "Dentro da Minha Cabeça", "Ninfomaníaca" and "Medusa"; bass on "Dentro da Minha Cabeça" and "Ninfomaníaca"
- Mulú – keyboards, synths and synth bass on "Sentimentos"
- Lucas Silveira – keyboards and synths on "A Lenda da Luz da Lua":
- Antônio Neves – brass on "Dentro da Minha Cabeça" and "Serpente"

=== Technical personnel ===
- Alice Caymmi – production, arrangements, idealization
- Vivian Kuczynski – beat programming on all tracks except "Sentimentos" and "Ninfomaníaca"; mixing on all tracks; recording and edition of vocals on all tracks except "Imaculada", in which she only edited
- Maffalda – beat programming on "Dentro da Minha Cabeça", "Ninfomaníaca" and "Medusa"
- Mulú – beat programming on "Sentimentos"
- Zebu – beat programming on "Imaculada", "Recíproco" and "Imaculada"
- Lucas Silveira – beat programming on "A Lenda da Luz da Lua"
- Rodrigo Gorky – recording of vocals on "Imaculada"
- Luiz Café – mastering on "Serpente"
- Giovanni Bianco – cover
