= Acústico (Natiruts album) =

Live album by Natiruts
- Released: September 17, 2012
- Recorded: February 1, 2012
- Venue: Mirante Dona Marta, Rio de Janeiro, Brazil
- Genre: Reggae, MPB
- Length: 72:22
- Language: Portuguese
- Label: Sony Music

Natiruts chronology
Raçaman (2009)	Acústico (2012)	#NOFILTER (2014)

Acústico is the second live album and the second DVD by the Brazilian Reggae band Natiruts, released on September 17, 2012 by Sony Music. It features an acoustic performance taped at Mirante Dona Marta in Rio de Janeiro on February 1, 2012.

== Track listing ==
Acústico — Brazilian standard version
No.	Title	Length
1.	"Dentro da Música II"	5:10
2.	"Groove Bom"	3:35
3.	"Meu Reggae É Roots"	3:20
4.	"Andei Só"	4:23
5.	"Au de Cabeça"	3:54
6.	"Quero Ser Feliz Também"	3:36
7.	"Supernova"	3:59
8.	"Pérola Negra"	3:29
9.	"Glamour Tropical (Rio em Dia de Paz)"	3:54
10.	"Já Chorei Demais"	3:25
11.	"Pedras Escondidas"	4:58
12.	"Você Me Encantou Demais"	3:32
13.	"O Carcará e a Rosa"	3:31
14.	"Deixa o Menino Jogar"	4:37
15.	"Liberdade pra Dentro da Cabeça"	4:13
16.	"No Mar"	3:27
17.	"Sorri, Sou Rei"	5:03
18.	"Natiruts Reggae Power/Esperar o Sol"	4:31
Total length:		72:22

Acústico — Brazilian deluxe version
No.	Title	Length
17.	"Vento, Sól, Coração"	5:29
18.	"A Cor"	4:06
19.	"Espero Que um Dia"	4:21

== Charts ==
Chart (2013)	Peak position
Portuguese Albums (AFP)	7

== Certifications ==
Region	Certification	Certified units/sales
Brazil (Pro-Música Brasil)	Diamond	300,000^{‡}
Brazil (Pro-Música Brasil) DVD	Gold	25,000^{*}
^{*} Sales figures based on certification alone.^{‡} Sales+streaming figures based on certification alone.
