= Memphis La Blusera =

Argentine blues/rock band

- Origin: Buenos Aires, Argentina
- Genres: Blues rock, Jazz
- Years active: 1978–2008
- Past members: Adrián Otero; Daniel Beiserman; Villanueva Emilio; Mira Marcelo; German

Memphis La Blusera was an Argentine blues/rock band created in 1978 and split in 2008. The band members were Adrián Otero on vocals; Daniel Beiserman on bass, acoustic bass, and vocals; Villanueva Emilio on tenor saxophone and bass; Mira Marcelo on drums; German Weidemer on keyboards, piano and Hammond organ; and Sedler Lucas on acoustic and electric guitar. They were known as the band that created and gave identity to the Argentine blues.

== History ==
Their first appearance was in the Unione e Benevolenza theatre, in 1978. After rehearsing for months, until they were satisfied with what they accomplished, they decided to organize the show. In 1981, they performed as the opening band for Pajarito Zaguri in Arena Obras Sanitarias and in 1982 they appeared in the “Festival BARock", for which they received great notices in the press. Their first album was Alma bajo la lluvia, which included the song Blues de las 6 y 30, one of their classics.

In the year 1989 they recorded their third album entitled Tonto rompecabezas, with the help of Andrés Calamaro. With this disc they left aside the social and street matter found in previous albums and concentrated more towards love. Later, they returned to their prior subject again, making a fourth album called Memphis la Blusera.

Followed by tours around the country, in 1994 they released a fifth album named Nunca tuve tanto blues. In this same year they played at the Gran Rex Theatre together with Taj Mahal, Albert King and B. B. King. This show was also recorded and edited for the sixth album named Memphis en vivo (Memphis Live). They release a seventh disc in 1995 called Cosa de hombres. This album was presented at Obras, and other parts of Argentina. By this time, the band had performed in 1300 shows in just 17 years. They receive a Gold Disc for both of these albums.

In 2000, the group signed with Warner Music, and recorded in Los Angeles their 10th album called Angelitos Culones produced by Oscar Mediavilla and Gustavo Borner. They received a Gold Disc and in the year 2002, they won a Carlos Gardel Award for best rock band, and were nominated for the video of Angelitos Culones. This was followed by an invitation to play with the Orquesta Sinfónica Nacional (National Symphonic Orchestra) in the Teatro Colón. This was recorded live and released as an album.

After 25 years of musical career, they played in the Luna Park stadium of Buenos Aires and recorded live, into the next album entitled 25° Aniversario (25th Anniversary) which included two CDs with classic songs of the band and two new songs Rodar o Morir and Que la vida siga.

Their last album, entitled "…Etc", was released in 2006.

Memphis La Blusera disbanded in 2008 after lead singer Adrian Otero had left to start a solo career; the remaining members of the band have continued as Viejos Lobos. Adrián Otero died in a car accident on June 12, 2012.

== Discography ==
- Alma bajo la lluvia, 1983
- Medias Negras, 1988
- Tonto Rompecabezas, 1989
- Memphis La Blusera, 1991
- Memphis en vivo, 1994
- Nunca tuve tanto blues, 1994
- Cosa de Hombres, 1995
- Hoy es Hoy, 1998
- El acústico, 1999
- Angelitos Culones, 2001
- Teatro Colón, 2003
- 25° Aniversario, 2004
- ...Etc., 2005
- Siempre, 2014
