= Nativus =

Studio album by Nativus
- Released: 1998
- Genre: Reggae; MPB
- Length: 56:38
- Language: Portuguese
- Label: EMI
- Producer: Nativus; Rodrigo Vidal

Nativus chronology
Nativus (1998)	Povo Brasileiro (1999)

Nativus is the debut studio album by the Brazilian Reggae band Nativus. The album was produced by Nativus and Rodrigo Vidal.

== Commercial performance ==
Nativus has been certified gold by the Associação Brasileira dos Produtores de Discos (ABPD). The album sold 450,000 copies in Brazil.

== Track listing ==
Nativus — Brazilian standard version
No.	Title	Length
1.	"Liberdade Pra Dentro da Cabeça"	4:47
2.	"Casulo"	4:23
3.	"Presente de Um Beija-Flor"	5:32
4.	"Deixa O Menino Jogar"	4:38
5.	"Semente Nativa"	4:37
6.	"Reggae de Raiz"	3:56
7.	"Som de Bob"	4:09
8.	"Mano Velho"	4:56
9.	"Dialetos da Paz (Tonoiado)"	4:22
10.	"Cantar"	7:25
11.	"Surfista do Lago Paranoa"	4:27
12.	"Adeus Mamaezinha"	3:14

== Certifications ==
Region	Certification	Certified units/sales
Brazil (Pro-Música Brasil)	Gold	100,000^{*}
^{*} Sales figures based on certification alone.
