= Ema Elena Valdelamar =

Mexican Composer and Singer

Ema Elena Valdelamar Casarín
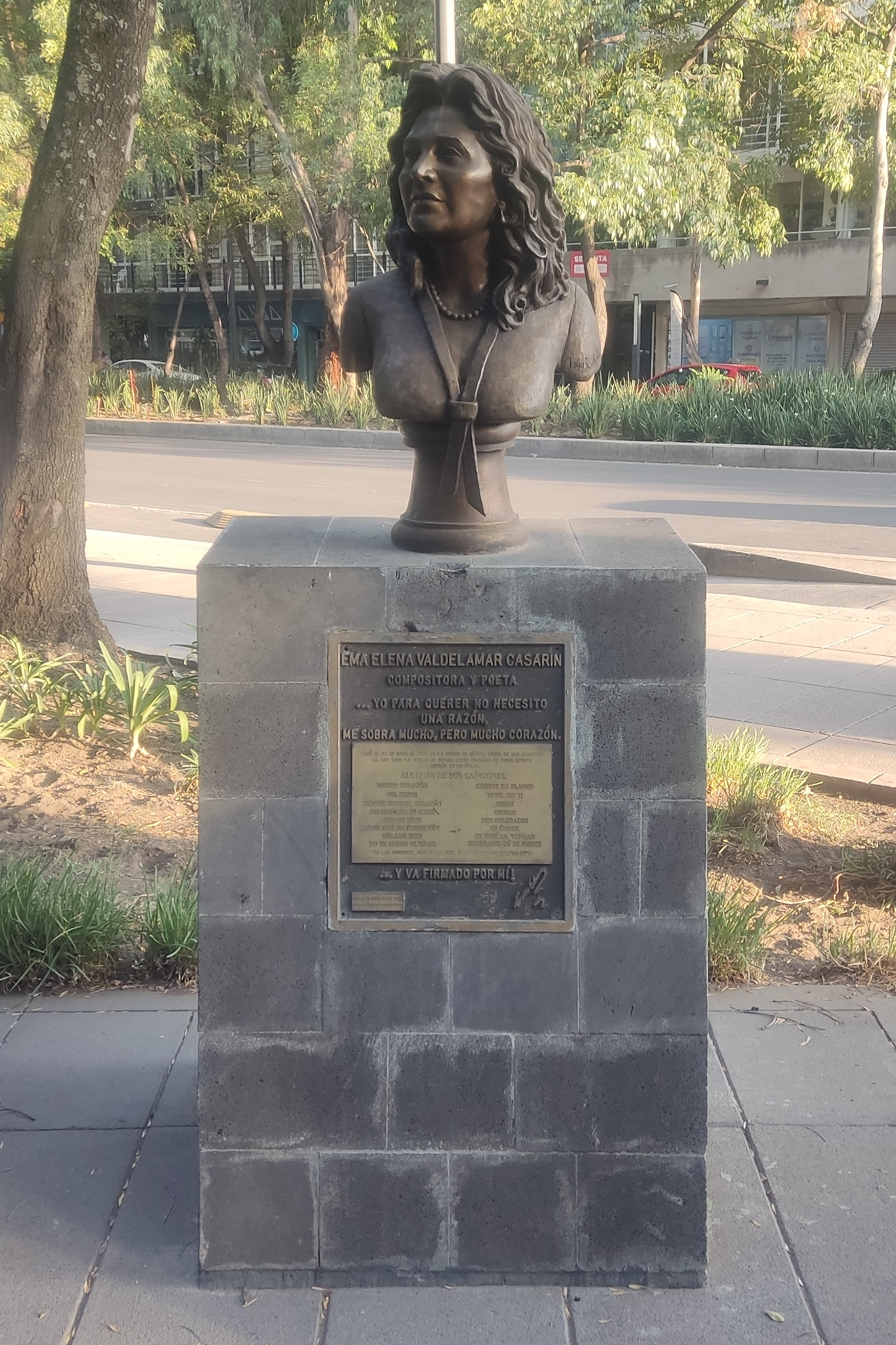
- Bust of Ema Elena Valdelamar in the Plaza de los Compositores
- Born: May 27, 1925 (age 100); Mexico City, Mexico
- Died: December 23, 2012 (aged 87); Mexico City, Mexico

Ema Elena Valdelamar Casarín (May 27, 1925 – December 23, 2012) was a Mexican composer who specialized in love songs and boleros.

== Early life and education ==
Ema Elena was born in Mexico City to Victoria Casarín, a housewife, and Darío Valdelamar, who worked for the National Railway. She began to write short stories and compose melodies at the young age of seven years old, and wrote her first song at twelve. Her mother, however, did not support Valdelamar's musical interests, and attempted to forbid her from engaging in artistic pursuits. Darío, on the other hand, was much more encouraging and even gave Ema Elena advice on how to copyright and register her songs, as well as instruction in accounting and business matters. Ema Elena was a promising lyric soprano when she was young and studied with famous Mexican voice teacher José Pierson, but after her father's death, her mother refused to pay for her singing lessons.

== Career ==
Over time, Valdelamar began composing boleros and, in the 1950s, won radio contests for her songs. Several of her songs became famous, including "Mucho corazón," which won a Grammy when recorded by Luis Miguel. "Cheque En Blanco" was also recorded by multiple artists, including Yuri and Paquita la del Barrio. Valdelamar was a board member of the Sociedad de autores y compositores de México (SACM) for many years.

== Discography ==
- Ema Elena Valdelamar - Compositora E Interpréte de Éxitos (1978)
- Mucho Corazón (1997)
- 15 Éxitos (1997)

=== Selected songs and compositions ===
- "Mucho Corazón"
- "Mil Besos"
- "Cheque en Blanco"
- "Por Que no Fuiste Tu"
