= Adrián Otero =

- Born: Adrián Fernando Otero; July 31, 1958; Buenos Aires, Argentina
- Died: June 12, 2012 (53) Córdoba, Argentina
- Genres: Rock; Blues
- Occupations: Musician, songwriter and singer
- Instrument: Vocals
- Formerly of: Memphis La Blusera

Adrián Fernando Otero (Buenos Aires, Argentina, July 31, 1958 – Córdoba, Argentina, June 12, 2012) was a singer of blues and Argentinian rock. He led Memphis La Blusera, a group of blues and rock, between 1978 and 2008.

Before devoting himself to music, Otero studied Psychology and travelled around the world. He also worked in various trades such as a sports journalist, craftsman and cook. In 1978, at the age of twenty two, he became the lead singer of Memphis La Blusera, a group for which he authored most of its lyrics.

After nearly thirty years as the head of the group, in 2008, he retired from Memphis La Blusera and released his first solo blues album in 2008 entitled Imán, followed by El jinete del Blues in 2012. Otero died on June 12, 2012, after a fatal traffic accident at age 53. After his death, it was discovered that Otero was a Mason.

== Discography ==
=== Memphis La Blusera ===
- Alma bajo la lluvia (1982)
- Medias negras (1986)
- Tonto rompecabezas (1988)
- Memphis La Blusera (1990)
- Nunca tuve tanto blues (1993)
- Memphis En Vivo (1994)
- Cosa de hombres (1996)
- Hoy es hoy (1998)
- El acústico (1999)
- Angelitos culones (2001)
- Teatro Colón (2003)
- 25º Aniversario (2004)
- ...Etc. (2006)

=== Soloist ===
- Imán (2008)
- El jinete del Blues (2012)
