= Busco un Pueblo =

Busco Un Pueblo

Studio album by Víctor Manuelle
- Released: January 21, 2012
- Recorded: 2010–2011
- Genre: Salsa
- Length: 41:49
- Language: Spanish
- Label: Sony

Víctor Manuelle chronology
Yo Mismo (2009)	Busco Un Pueblo (2012)	Me Llamare Tuyo (2013)

Singles from Busco Un Pueblo
- 1. "Si Tú Me Besas" Released: October 8, 2011; 2. "Ella Lo Que Quiere Es Salsa" Released: January 21, 2012

Busco Un Pueblo (English: I am Searching for A City) is the thirteenth studio album by Puerto Rican-American salsa singer-songwriter Víctor Manuelle released on January 21, 2012 on Sony Music. It contains two singles. "Si Tu Me Besas" was released on October 9, 2011 as the first official single and "Ella Lo Que Quiere Es Salsa" was released on January 21, 2012, it features Julio Voltio and Jowell & Randy. A deluxe edition was released on January 24, 2012 featuring five bonus tracks. The Album Cover is a reference to the famous Uncle Sam poster.

== Track listing ==
No.	Title	Writer(s)	Length
1.	"Cómo le Digo al Alma"	Víctor M. Ruíz	4:06
2.	"Duele Sin Ti"	Gabriel Cruz	3:42
3.	"Junto a Ti"	Víctor M. Ruíz	4:29
4.	"Si Tú Me Besas"	Oscar "Oscarcito" Hernández	4:20
5.	"Busco un Pueblo"	Víctor M. Ruíz	4:25
6.	"Ella Cambió Mi Vida"	Raúl del Sol	5:12
7.	"Ella Lo Que Quiere Es Salsa" (featuring Julio Voltio and Jowell & Randy)	Víctor M. Ruíz	4:01
8.	"Termina en un Beso"	Lenny Salcedo	3:08
9.	"Amar de Nuevo"	Miguel Ignacio Mendoza (Nacho)	4:29
10.	"Duele Sin Ti (Ballad version)"	Gabriel Cruz	3:57

Deluxe Edition
No.	Title	Writer(s)	Length
11.	"Llegaste Tú (Ballad version))"	Carlos Manuel Agosto	4:44
12.	"Amar de Nuevo (Ballad version)"	Miguel Ignacio Mendoza (Nacho)	3:57
13.	"Si Tú Me Besas (Ballad version)"	Oscar "Oscarcito" Hernández	4:18
14.	"Llegaste Tú"	Carlos Manuel Agosto	4:34
15.	"Las Huellas de Tu Amor"	Alex José Duarte Vergara	3:55
Total length:			63:18

== Personnel ==
- Coro - Cano Estremera
- Piano - Carlitos García
- Bongos - Carmelo Alvarez
- Coro - Domingo Quiñones
- Arreglos - Efrain "Junito" Davila
- Coros, Piano - Efraín Dávila
- Road Manager - Félex "Rayito" López
- Composer - Gabriel Cruz
- Congas, Coro - Gerardo Rivas
- Coro - Gilberto Santa Rosa
- Coros - Guianko Gómez
- Arreglos, Bateria, Coro, Keyboards, Piano - Harry Aponte
- Composer - Ignacio Miguel Mendoza
- Baritonos - Ismael Vergara
- Coros - Jameson Zayas
- Arreglos, Peinado - Jesús Cancel
- Coro - Josué Rosado
- Coros - José "El Profesor" Gómez
- Coro - José L. "Chegui" Ramos
- Featured Artist - Jovell
- Mezcla - Juan Mario "Mayito" Aracil
- Composer - Lenny Salcedo
- Piano - Luis Marin
- Congas - Luisito Quintero
- Coro - Norberto Vélez
- Composer - Oscar "Oscarcito" Hernández
- Vestuario - Pedro Serrano
- Bongos - Rafael "Tito" De Garcia
- Arreglos - Ramón Sánchez
- Featured Artist - Randy
- Composer - Raul del Sol
- Campana - Ray Colón
- Coro - Ricardo Porrata
- Guiro, Maracas, Timbales - Santiago "Chago" Martínez
- Featured Artist - Voltrio
- Arreglos, Composer - Víctor M. Ruíz
- Primary Artist - Víctor Manuelle

== Charts ==
=== Weekly charts ===
Chart (2012)	Peak position
US Billboard 200	158
US Top Latin Albums (Billboard)	4
US Tropical Albums (Billboard)	2

=== Year-end charts ===
Chart (2012)	Position
US Top Latin Albums (Billboard)	61

== Certifications ==
Region	Certification	Certified units/sales
United States (RIAA)	Gold (Latin)	30,000^{‡}
^{‡} Sales+streaming figures based on certification alone.
