= Celebrando Al Príncipe =

Compilation album by Cristian Castro
- Released: November 13, 2012
- Recorded: 2012 The Hit Factory Criteria; Miami, Florida
- Genre: Latin pop
- Language: Spanish
- Label: Universal Music Latino
- Producer: Rafael Perez-Botija

Cristian Castro chronology
Mi Amigo El Príncipe (2011)	Celebrando Al Príncipe (2012)	En Primera Fila: Día 1 (2013)

Singles from Celebrando al Príncipe
- 1. "Mi Vida" Released: October 30, 2012

Celebrando Al Príncipe (Celebrating the Prince) is a compilation album by Mexican pop singer Cristian Castro released by Universal Music Latino on November 13, 2012. The album follows the productions ofViva el Príncipe and Mi Amigo El Príncipe where Castro in which covers José José's songs whom Castro considers his musical idol. The album contains thirteen songs from both of the previous albums as well as two new covers: "Mi Vida" and "Pero Me Hiciste Tuyo". "Mi Vida" was released as a single on October 30, 2012 to promote the album. This is the last recording by Castro to be released under Universal Music Latin Entertainment as he left the record label to return with Sony Music.

== Track listing ==
- Track listing provided by Allmusic.

No.	Title	Writer(s)	Length
1.	"Lo Nave del Olvido"	Dino Ramos	3:54
2.	"Lo Que No Fue No Será"	José María Napoleón	3:48
3.	"El Triste"	Roberto Cantoral	4:37
4.	"Buenos Dias Amor"	Juan Carlos Calderón	4:00
5.	"Gavilán O Paloma"	Rafael Perez Botija	4:45
6.	"Almohada"	Jorge Adan Torres Solis	4:02
7.	"Me Basta"	Rafael Perez Botija	4:22
8.	"Preso"	Rafael Perez Botija	3:22
9.	"Lo Dudo"	Manuel Alejandro, Ana Magdalena	4:24
10.	"Pero Me Hiciste Tuyo"	Jose Miguel Gallardo Vera	4:14
11.	"Si Me Dejas Ahora"	Camilo Blanes	4:48
12.	"Amor, Amor"	Rafael Perez Botija	4:58
13.	"Desesperado"	Rafael Pérez Botija, Maria Enriqueta Ramos Nuñez	4:18
14.	"Amar y Querer"	Manuel Alejandro, Ana Magdalena	4:04
15.	"Mi Vida"	Rafael Pérez Botija, Maria Enriqueta Ramos Nuñez	3:42
16.	"Dame La Llave De Tu Corazón" (South American edition)		3:18

== Chart performance ==
Chart (2012)	Peak position
U.S. Billboard Top Latin Albums	34
U.S. Billboard Latin Pop Albums	11
