= Quero Ser Feliz Também =

2005 song by Natiruts

Single by Natiruts

from the album Nossa Missão
- Released: 9 de maio de 2005
- Genre: Reggae
- Length: 4:14
- Label: Raizama Records
- Producer(s): Alexandre Carlo

Natiruts singles chronology
"Não Chore Meu Amor" (2005)	"Quero Ser Feliz Também" (2005)	"Natiruts Reggae Power" (2007)

Music video
- "Quero Ser Feliz Também" on YouTube

Quero Ser Feliz Também is a song by the Brazilian Reggae band Natiruts, released as a single for the fifth studio album Nossa Missão.

== Commercial performance ==
In the original version the song topped the Brazilian radio charts. in 2013 the song was also re-released in an unplugged version that reached the position No. 69 on the Billboard Brasil Hot 100 Airplay chart.

=== Weekly charts ===
Chart performance for Quero Ser Feliz Também
Chart (2013)	Peak position
Brazil (Billboard Hot 100 Airplay)	69

== Certifications ==
Certifications for "Quero Ser Feliz Também"
Region	Certification	Certified units/sales
Brazil (Pro-Música Brasil)	2× Diamond	1,000,000^{‡}
^{‡} Sales+streaming figures based on certification alone.
