= Rainha dos Raios =

Studio album by Alice Caymmi
- Released: September 9, 2014
- Genre: Música popular brasileira
- Length: 28:03
- Label: Joia Moderna
- Producer: Diogo Strausz

Alice Caymmi chronology
Alice Caymmi (2012)	Rainha dos Raios (2014)	Alice (2018)

Rainha dos Raios (Queen of Lightning) is the second album by Brazilian singer Alice Caymmi, released on 9 September 2014. It is her first album via Joia Moderna and with producer Diogo Strausz. While her previous album, Alice Caymmi, consisted mostly of original songs and two covers, Rainha dos Raios does the opposite and brings covers and two original tracks. According to Caymmi, this shift came after a few changes she went through - she said she is no longer performing songs from the previous album. She commented:

It's my album, and, without trying to be a showoff, I listen to it a lot, because it says a lot about my life. I did this album thinking of what I stop to listen to, the things I like to listen to and the way I like to do it. It looks like I made the album for me. I laugh, play and remind of many moments.

In another interview, she defined the album as follows:

The rebelliousness, the punk and the rock already do that, there's nothing new, but there's the context of Brazil. My challenge is to create a strong artist aesthetic in a country difficult to interpret. A country with black and indigenous history, a colonized and suffering country. To be an artist in Brazil is almost to be an anthropologist.

Rainha dos Raios was followed by her first Brazilian tour, starting in Salvador, Bahia.

About doing so many covers, she stated: "I don't like to write what I want to say, I like to use other people's words. [...] I like to sing situations that I never saw happening. It's a way of living other things".

== Song information ==
"Como Vês" and "Meu Mundo Caiu" were featured at the soundtrack of Felizes para Sempre? series, on Rede Globo. "Meu Recado", one of the original ones, was co-written by Michael Sullivan, to whom Caymmi credits "80% of my musical life".

"Sou Rebelde" is a re-recording of "Soy Rebelde", a 1971 hit by Spanish singer Jeanette, and a Brazilian hit in 1978 when recorded by Lilian, with Portuguese lyrics by Paulo Coelho. "Princesa", another cover, was originally released by funker MC Marcinho. About the track, Caymmi said: "It's very good to be born in a family important as fuck inside music and record MC Marcinho just to mess around. This is the best thing I could have done in life". In another interview, she said: "I've got this kinda rebel without a cause side, you know? It's a little whining, a kind of a immature thing, but that, in an artistic environment, makes sense. That's why I sang this song, which is a great bullshit, but has to do with this teenager thing, ridiculous and comic, and that at the same time saved me."

"Iansã" was composed by Brazilians Gilberto Gil and Caetano Veloso and it refers to the homonymous deity. About the goddess, Caymmi said: "The Gods of Candomblé have all this very particular mythology that refer to fundamental things to us, and Iansã is about going from one extreme to the other, which I think is the big question nowadays. It's about the excessively fast transition from euphoria to depression, from bad weather to good weather. The middle way is far from us. And she does that. Besides the power of rupture of this orixá, besides being a battling and absolutely powerful, warlike and feminine woman, she has the power over both extremes. She is the queen of such balance.".

== Tracks ==
No.	Title	Music	Length
1.	"Como Vês" (As You See)	Bruno Di Lulo / Domenico Lancellotti	4:37
2.	"Homem" (Man)	Caetano Veloso	4:02
3.	"Meu Recado" (My Message)	Alice Caymmi / Michael Sullivan	3:57
4.	"Princesa" (Princess)	MC Marcinho	3:49
5.	"Meu Mundo Caiu" (My World Fell Apart)	Maysa	3:24
6.	"Antes de Tudo" (Before Everything)	Alice Caymmi	2:49
7.	"Sou Rebelde (Soy Rebelde)" (I'm Rebel)	Manuel Alejandro / Ana Magdalena; versão de Paulo Coelho	2:52
8.	"Iansã"	Gilberto Gil / Caetano Veloso	3:29
9.	"Jasper"	Caetano Veloso / Arto Linsay / Peter Sherer	4:12
Total length:			30:11

== Critical reception ==
Professional ratings
Review scores
Source	Rating
Miojo Indie	9.0/10
De Olho no Groove	6/10 stars
O Globo	great

The album was received with mixed to positive reviews from critics.

Cleber Facchi, from Miojo Indie, said the album is far from being summarizable as a single "cover album'", and that producer Diogo Strausz "plays around not only with the experimental base of each song, but with the essence of the singer herself", concluding that"Rainha dos Raios is the album in which Caymmi certainly takes down her own blocks, revealing a path that, even if inconstant, remains clean and tempting to the visitor."

Tiago Ferreira, from De Olho no Groove, gave the album a 6/10 rating, stating that its successor will be better and concluding: "contrary to the path a member of the Caymmi family would follow, Alice Caymmi possesses in her subversion, rather than in any technique, her biggest musical triumph. The scope she offers in Rainha dos Raios escapes from the boring examples of artist that gush as acid rain on Brazilian music."

Carlos Albuquerque, from O Globo, compared Caymmi's hair on the cover with PJ Harvey's on Rid of Me. He also said Caymmi looks more confident and original in Rainha dos Raios, commenting: "Hand in hand with musician and producer Diogo Strausz, Caymmi crosses the gap between one work and the other, — and in the process, everything that was devious was discarded, and what was promising was materialized."

It was elected as the third best 2014 Brazilian album by Rolling Stone Brasil and it was nominated for the 26th Brazilian Music Awards, in the category "Best Pop/Rock/Reggae/Hiphop/Funk Album", and also resulting in Caymmi being nominated for the category "Best Pop/Rock/Reggae/Hiphop/Funk Female Singer". In 2019, Mauro Ferreira elected it one of the 10 essential albums of the 2010s.
