= Imaculada, Paraíba =

Coordinates: 7°22′S 37°30′W

La Inmaculada
- Municipality
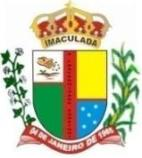
- Flag Coat of arms
- Interactive map of La Inmaculada
- Country: Brazil
- Region: Northeast
- State: Paraíba
- Mesoregion: Sertao Paraibana

Population (2020)
  - Total: 11,848
- Time zone: UTC−3 (BRT)

Imaculada is a municipality in the state of Paraíba in the Northeast Region of Brazil.

== See also ==
- List of municipalities in Paraíba
