= Nelson Schwenke =

Nelson Schwenke was part of the Chilean musical duo Schwenke & Nilo, which formed in the Chilean city of Valdivia in 1978. The other half of the duo is Marcelo Nilo. Schwenke and Nilo met at the Universidad Austral de Chile. The group's first compositions were written by Schwenke, with musical arrangements by Nilo.

The group's lyrics were highly critical of the military regime in power at the time in Chile, but are also relevant to the culture of southern Chile. Other themes include human rights, human dignity, work, family, friendship, the community, and connections to nature and the environment. Due to this, Schwenke und Nilo are a group in the style of the Nueva Canción Chilena. They have received Gold and Platinum status for record sales, but have also been recognized with the distinction of Cultural Ambassadors of Southern Chile by the government of the Region de los Lagos (2003).

Nelson Schwenke died on 22 June 2012, as the result of a motor vehicle accident in Santiago de Chile.
