= El Beso (Pablo Alborán song) =

Single by Pablo Alborán

from the album Tanto
- Released: December 2012
- Recorded: 2012
- Genre: Pop
- Length: 4:19
- Label: EMI Music
- Songwriter(s): Pablo Alborán
- Producer(s): Manuel Illán

Pablo Alborán singles chronology
| "Vuelvo a verte" (2012) | "El Beso" (2012) | "Quién" (2013) |

Music video
- "El Beso" on YouTube

"El Beso" (English: "The Kiss") is a song recorded by the Spanish singer-songwriter Pablo Alborán. The song was released as the second single from his second studio album Tanto (2012). It was released in December 2012 as a digital download in Spain. The single peaked at number 1 on the Spanish Singles Chart in February 2013

== Music video ==
An acoustic video for the song was released on 27 October 2012. The official music video for "El Beso" was released on 8 February 2013.

== Track listing ==
Digital download
| No. | Title | Length |
|---|---|---|
| 1. | "El Beso" | 4:19 |

== Chart performance ==
=== Weekly charts ===
| Chart (2012/13) | Peak position |
|---|---|
| Spain (PROMUSICAE) | 1 |

=== Year-end charts ===
| End Of Year (2013) | Peak position |
|---|---|
| Spain (PROMUSICAE) | 25 |

== Certifications ==
| Region | Certification | Certified units/sales |
|---|---|---|
| Spain (PROMUSICAE) | Gold | 30,000^{‡} |
^{‡} Sales+streaming figures based on certification alone.

== Release history ==
| Region | Date | Format | Label |
|---|---|---|---|
| Spain | December 2012 | Digital download | EMI Music |

== See also ==
- List of number-one singles of 2013 (Spain)
