= Quién (Pablo Alborán song) =

Single by Pablo Alborán

from the album Tanto
- Released: April 2013
- Recorded: 2012
- Genre: Pop
- Length: 4:06
- Label: Warner Music Spain
- Songwriter: Pablo Alborán
- Producer: Manuel Illán

Pablo Alborán singles chronology
"El Beso" (2012)	"Quién" (2013)	"La de la Mala Suerte" (2013)

Music video
- "Quién" on YouTube

"Quién" (English: "Who") is a song recorded by the Spanish singer-songwriter Pablo Alborán. The song was released as the third single from his second studio album Tanto (2012). It was released in April 2013 as a digital download in Spain. The single peaked at number 1 on the Spanish Singles Chart in May 2013.

== Music video ==
The official music video for "Quién" was released on 3 May 2013.

== Track listing ==
Digital download
No.	Title	Length
1.	"Quién"	4:06

== Chart performance ==
"Quién" debuted at number 46 on the Spanish singles chart for the week commencing 5 May 2013, before reaching number 1 the following week.

=== Weekly charts ===
Chart (2013–15)	Peak position
Spain (PROMUSICAE)	1

=== Year-end charts ===
End Of Year (2013)	Peak position
Spain (PROMUSICAE)	17

== Certifications ==
Region	Certification	Certified units/sales
Spain (PROMUSICAE)	Platinum	60,000^{‡}
^{‡} Sales+streaming figures based on certification alone.

== Release history ==
Region	Date	Format	Label
Spain	April 2013	Digital download	EMI Music

== See also ==
- List of number-one singles of 2013 (Spain)
