= Alice Caymmi (album) =

Studio album by Alice Caymmi
- Released: August 27, 2012
- Genre: Música popular brasileira
- Length: 28:03
- Label: Kuarup / Sony Music
- Producer: Flávio Mendes

Alice Caymmi chronology
Alice Caymmi (2012)	Rainha dos Raios (2014)

Alice Caymmi is the debut album by the Brazilian artist of the same name, released in 2012, produced by Flávio Mendes, with Caymmi being the art director herself. She described the album as follows: "The album has an aquatic environment, a reference to my grandfather (Dorival Caymmi), to the mythic sea he created. But I like the more obscure things. I brought the more tragic side of his songs, the night sea, darker. [...] Not that I feel I am the avant-guarde-ist, but I want out of the comfort zone. I could have made the album one would expect from the young granddaughter of Caymmi. But there would be no album, it wouldn't be so emotional. For this album, I wanted the noise, the noise language. I don't think I made it, because the songs didn't have this head. But I tried to bring them to this tragic, noisy environment of sea, of night". Originally, the album would be entirely performed by Alice alone and would feature seven tracks. However, producer Flávio Mendes convinced her to enlarge the track list and invite more musicians.

Some of the lyrics were composed during her adolescence. There are two covers in the album, "Sargaço Mar" and "Unravel". The first was composed by her grandfather. She describes it as "a song that is independent of harmony, just her melody already shows what it is. I then tried to acclimatize it in a scenic way. [...] If I had it my way, it would open the album, my career, everything". "Unravel" was originally performed by Icelandic singer Björk – about this version, the European singer supposedly said in her website that "there's no way of doing it better than that", making Alice cry for her acknowledgment.

== Critical reception ==
Professional ratings
Review scores
Source	Rating
Miojo Indie	8.4 stars on a 10 point scale
Blog Notas Musicais	4/5 stars

Writing in his blog Notas Musicais, reviewer Mauro Ferreira praised the album and said Alice "reveals herself as an artist that has her own identity", despite the covers and the surname. Cleber Facchi, from Miojo Indie, saw similarities between Alice and her grandfather would being inspired by the sea to compose, but he also identified a light in the singer, concluding that "even without knowing about the future, Caymmi sails confidently, fearless of what she might encounter ahead."

== Track listing ==
All tracks are written by Alice Caymmi, except where noted.

No.	Title	Length
1.	"Água Marinha" (Sea Water; co-written by Paulo César Pinheiro)	2:31
2.	"Arco da Aliança" (Alliance Arch)	3:21
3.	"Mater Contínua"	3:21
4.	"Revés" (Setback)	3:06
5.	"Sangue, Água e Sal" (Blood, Water and Salt; co-written by Pinheiro)	3:12
6.	"Rompante" (Outburst)	2:40
7.	"Vento Forte" (Strong Wind)	3:17
8.	"Sargaço Mar" (Dorival Caymmi)	2:04
9.	"Tudo Que For Leve" (All That is Light)	3:11
10.	"Unravel" (Björk/Guy Sigsworth)	2:30
Total length:		28:03

== Personnel ==
- Alice Caymmi — vocals on all tracks; acoustic guitar on "Revés"
- Alexandre Moreira — backing vocals and moogerfooger on "Tudo Que For Leve"
- Bela Meirelles — declamation on "Revés"
- Rafael Rocha — guitar, acoustic guitar, steel guitar on "Água Marinha"; drums on "Arco da Aliança", "Rompante" and "Vento Forte"; percussion on "Arco da Aliança", "Revés", "Rompante" and "Vento Forte"; electronic effects on "Arco da Aliança", "Revés", "Rompante" and "Sargaço Mar"; atabaques on "Sangue, Água e Sal"
- Flávio Mendes — backing vocals on "Tudo Que For Leve"; acoustic guitar on "Sangue, Água e Sal", "Vento Forte" and "Tudo Que For Leve"; arpeggiator on "Água Marinha"; steel guitar "Arco da Aliança", "Mater Continua", "Rompante", "Sangue, Água e Sal" and "Vento Forte"; piano on "Unravel"; conducting on "Mater Continua" and "Sangue, Água e Sal"; animoog on "Vento Forte", "Tudo Que For Leve" and "Unravel"
- Alberto Continentino — bass on "Arco da Aliança", "Rompante" and "Vento Forte"
- Murilo O'Reilly — percussion on "Água Marinha", efeitos eletrônicos on "Sargaço Mar"
- Fabiano Salek — percussion on "Tudo Que For Leve"
- Itamar Assiere — accordion on "Arco da Aliança" and "Rompante", Fender Rhodes piano on "Arco da Aliança", "Rompante" and "Vento Forte"
- Gretel Paganini — cellos on "Mater Continua", "Rompante" and "Sangue, Água e Sal"
- Tina Werneck — steel violas on "Mater Continua" and "Sangue, Água e Sal"
