= Natiruts =

Brazilian reggae band

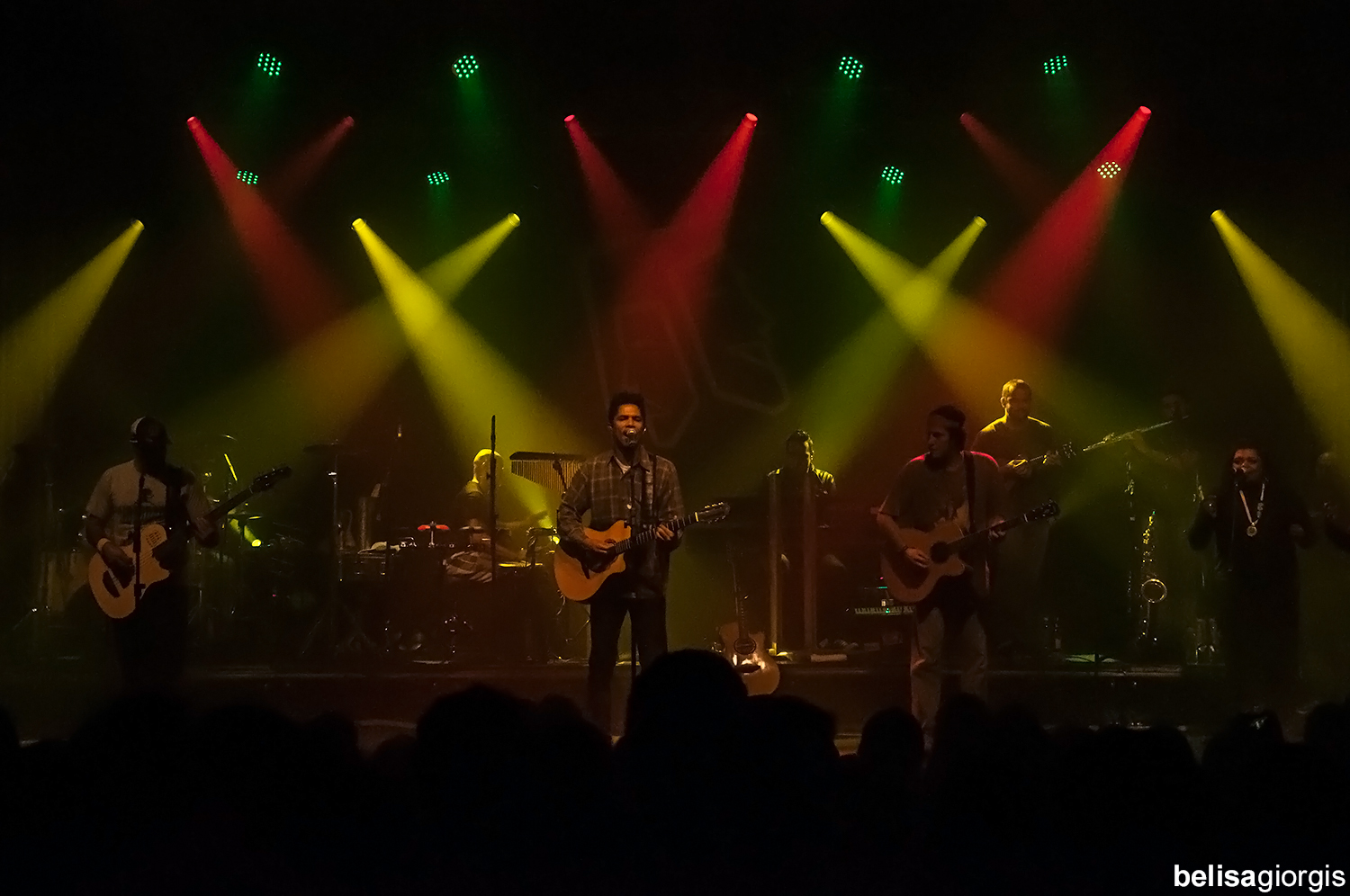
- Natiruts in 2013

Background information
- Origin: Brasília, Brazil
- Genres: Reggae, reggae fusion, MPB, samba reggae
- Years active: 1996–2024
- Labels: EMI, Sony Music
- Members: Alexandre Carlo; Luís Mauricio
- Past members: Bruno Dourado; Izabella Rocha; Kiko Peres; Juninho
- Website: natiruts.com

Natiruts was a Brazilian reggae band from Brasília. Formed in 1996, Natiruts has released six studio albums and five live albums during a career spanning three decades. The group released its debut album Nativus in 1997 and increased in popularity through its 2009 album Raçaman and the accompanying single "Sorri, Sou Rei". The group's 2012 album Acústico was nominated for Best Brazilian Contemporary Pop Album at the 2013 Latin Grammy Awards.

== History ==
Natiruts formed in 1996 after a barbecue in which lead vocalist Alexandre Carlo proposed the idea of popularizing reggae in Brazil. The band changed its name several times in its early stages, beginning with the name Nativus, which was already taken, then to Os Nativos, then to Natiruts Reggae Power Ao Vivo, which was later shortened to Natiruts. Having formed in Brasília, Natiruts deviated from the local rock scene in the city by singing about spirituality and environmentalism. Despite the band's perception that the city was not the "ideal environment" for tropical music in that it lacked beaches and other aspects associated with the genre, the group demonstrated strong reggae influences since its formation. The band's debut album, Nativus, was released in 1997.

Despite gaining local popularity in its formative years, Natiruts' 2009 album Raçaman, was viewed as the group's breakthrough album. In 2009, the band released the song "Sorri, Sou Rei", which became one of the group's signature songs. The group's 2012 album Acústico was nominated for Best Brazilian Contemporary Pop Album at the 2013 Latin Grammy Awards, but lost to Músicas Para Churrasco Vol. 1 Ao Vivo by Seu Jorge. On 1 October 2016, Natiruts performed at the SOMOS event in Puerto Rico to celebrate the twentieth anniversary of the formation of Puerto Rican reggae band Cultura Profética. The band's 2017 music video for "Sol do Meu Amanhecer" featured Game of Thrones actor Diogo Sales and Miss Brazil 2016 Raissa Santana. Lead vocalist Alexandre Carlo participated in a virtual Mother's Day festival on 10 May 2020 during the COVID-19 pandemic.

In 2021, their song "Lágrimas de Alegria" (with Maneva) was nominated for the Latin Grammy Award for Best Portuguese Language Song.

The band announced on 26 February 2024 the farewell tour "Leve com Você". The group led by vocalist Alexandre Carlo will end their musical career of almost three decades with 20 shows across Brazil. The name of the tour, "Leve com Você", is a tribute to the single released by the band in 2002.

== Artistry ==
The band is primarily reggae but has also incorporated elements of rock, funk, and dancehall. Lyrically, the band discusses spiritual and ecological concerns. American musician Michael Franti, a fan of the group, claims that Natiruts "are legendary in their native Brazil".

== Members ==
=== Current line-up ===
- Alexandre Carlo: lead vocals, rhythm guitar
- Luís Mauricio: bass guitar

=== Past members ===
- Bruno Dourado: percussion
- Izabella Rocha: backing vocals
- Juninho: drums
- Kiko Peres: lead guitar

== Discography ==
=== Studio albums ===
- (1997) Nativus
- (1999) Povo Brasileiro
- (2001) Verbalize
- (2002) Qu4tro
- (2005) Nossa Missão
- (2009) Raçaman
- (2017) Índigo Cristal
- (2018) I Love
- (2021) Good Vibration

=== Live/video albums ===
- (2006) Natiruts Reggae Power
- (2012) Acústico
- (2014) #NOFILTER
- (2015) Reggae Brasil
- (2023) En Vivo en Argentina
