= Si Tú Me Besas =

Single by Víctor Manuelle

Single by Victor Manuelle

from the album Busco un Pueblo
- Released: October 8, 2011
- Recorded: 2011
- Genre: Salsa
- Length: 4:20
- Label: Sony Music Latin
- Songwriter: Oscar Oscarcito Hernández

Victor Manuelle singles chronology
"Daría Mi Vida Por Ella" (2010)	"Si Tú Me Besas" (2011)	"Ella Lo Que Quiere Es Salsa" (2012)

"Si Tú Me Besas" (English: "If You Kiss Me") is a song by Puerto Rican-American recording artist Victor Manuelle. It was composed by Venezuelan singer-songwriter Oscar Oscarcito Hernández and released on October 9, 2011 as the lead single from his thirteenth studio album Busco un Pueblo and . The song is a salsa recording which combines the sounds of bomba and reggaeton urban music. A ballad version of the song was also recorded which is included on the deluxe edition of the album.

The song became his second number-one single in the Billboard Hot Latin Songs chart, his first on the Billboard Latin Pop Songs chart, and his twentieth on the Billboard Tropical Songs. It received a positive reception from critics who praised the lyrics and music in the recording. A music video for the song was filmed in Puerto Rico which was directed by Israel Lugo and Cesar Gonzalez of the Rojo Chiringa productions. Victor Manuelle performed the song at the 13th Annual Latin Grammy Awards.

== Background and composition ==
Victor Manuelle "Si Tú Me Besas" (2012)
25-second sample of "Si Tú Me Besas". The song combines the sounds of bomba and reggaeton .

"Si Tú Me Besas" was written by the Venezuelan composer Oscar Oscarcito Hernández. Victor Manuelle describes that the song makes the perfect combination of keeping up with the "new times, and the tastes of youth in our generation, without losing the essence of our traditional rhythms". The song blends the beat of "la bomba" with "sounds and the rhythmic foundation of reggaeton, which gives the salsa a different touch."

== Release and chart performance ==
The song was released on October 9, 2011 by Sony Music Latin. A ballad version of the song was released on the deluxe edition of the album. "Si Tú Me Besas" debuted in the Billboard Hot Latin Songs chart at number 40 in the week of November 12, 2012, climbing to the top ten eighteen weeks later. The song peaked atop the chart for the week of February 18, 2012 becoming his second number-one song on the chart, replacing "Me Gustas Tanto" by Paulina Rubio and was succeeded by "Lovumba", by Daddy Yankee a week later.

On the Billboard Latin Pop Songs chart, the song debuted at number 38 for the week of November 5, 2011. The song reached number-one on the week of February 4, 2012, replacing "El Verdadero Amor Perdona" by Maná, becoming his first number-one single on the chart, and was succeeded by "Lovumba" by Daddy Yankee. On the Billboard Tropical Songs chart, the song debuted at number 14 on the week of November 5, 2011. It reached number-one single on the week of February 11, 2012 replacing "Las Cosas Pequeñas" by Prince Royce and was succeeded by "Mi Santa" by Romeo Santos two weeks later. It became his 20th number-one single on the chart, tying Manuelle and Marc Anthony for having the most number-one singles in the Tropical Songs.

== Critical reception ==
On the review for the album, David Jeffries of Allmusic referred to the song as a "spicy backbeat/soaring melody" and that it lays "the groundwork for the possible future category of salsa power ballad". Juan Mesa of About.com wrote that the song "presents a letter full details about the desire to become a couple". Hector Aviles of Latino Music Café listed "Si Tú Me Besas" as one of the songs in the album to have "excellente quality" in the song lyrics and as a "great romantic song". The track was nominated for Tropical Song of the Year at the Premio Lo Nuestro 2013.

== Music video ==
The music video for "Si Tú Me Besas" was filmed at various locations in the metropolitan area of Puerto Rico and was released on December 7, 2011. It was directed by Israel Lugo and Cesar Gonzalez of the Rojo Chiringa productions. In the video there is the issue of a kiss through the eyes of a young man who one morning on his way to work realizes that the world is kissing and that the act is totally contagious if one looks around.

== Charts ==
=== Weekly charts ===
Chart (2012)	Position
US Hot Latin Songs (Billboard)	1
US Latin Pop Airplay (Billboard)	1
US Tropical Songs (Billboard)	1
Venezuela (Record Report) Remix version: Featuring Oscarcito	1

=== Yearly charts ===
Chart (2012)	Position
US Latin Songs (Billboard)	42
US Latin Pop Songs (Billboard)	27
US Tropical Songs (Billboard)	11

== Certifications ==
Region	Certification	Certified units/sales
United States (RIAA)	Platinum (Latin)	60,000^{‡}
^{‡} Sales+streaming figures based on certification alone.

== See also ==
- List of number-one Billboard Top Latin Songs of 2012
- List of number-one Billboard Hot Latin Pop Airplay of 2012
