= Ella Lo Que Quiere Es Salsa =

"Ella Lo Quiere Es Salsa"

Single by Víctor Manuelle (featuring Julio Voltio and Jowell & Randy)

from the album Busco un Pueblo
- Released: January 21, 2012
- Recorded: 2011
- Genre: Salsa
- Length: 4:00
- Label: Sony Music Latin
- Songwriter: Víctor M. Ruíz

Victor Manuelle singles chronology
"Si Tú Me Besas" (2011)	"Ella Lo Quiere Es Salsa" (2012)	"Me Llamaré Tuyo" (2012)

Julio Voltio singles chronology
"Bikini Mini" (2010)	"Ella Lo Quiere Es Salsa" (2012)	"Le Dio Pa' Mi" (2012)

Jowell & Randy singles chronology
"Sin Compromiso" (2012)	"Ella Lo Quiere Es Salsa" (2012)	"Sobredoxis" (2012)

Audio sample
- A 24 second sample of Ella Lo Quiere Es Salsa featuring part of the chorus and Voltio's verse.: file; help

"Ella Lo Que Quiere Es Salsa" (English: "What She Wants Is Salsa") is a song by Puerto Rican-American recording artist Victor Manuelle featuring Julio Voltio and Jowell & Randy. It was composed by himself and released on January 21, 2012, as the second single off his thirteenth studio album Busco un Pueblo. An urban version was also recorded and later released on May 28, 2012. The song became his twenty-first number one single on the Billboard Tropical Songs chart which led to Manuelle becoming the artist with the most number-one singles on the chart. It was also a minor success peaking on the Billboard Latin Songs and Billboard Latin Pop Songs charts at number 29 and 33 respectively. It received positive reviews from critics praising the music in the song. A music video was released on July 5, 2012, which was directed by Steven Tapia.

== Song information ==
"Ella Lo Que Quiere Es Salsa" is a song which was written by Manuelle and features fellow Puerto Rican artists Voltio and Jowell & Randy. The song is a salsa record that fuses the sound of urban music.

== Release and chart performance ==
The song was released on April 2, 2012, as the second single from the album. A reggaeton version was released on May 28, 2012. On the Billboard Hot Latin Songs chart, the song debuted at #41 on the week of June 9, 2012, and peaked at #29 on the week of July 28, 2012. On the Billboard Latin Pop Songs chart, the song debuted #34 on the week of June 16, 2012, and peaked #33 on the week of July 14, 2012. On the Billboard Tropical Songs chart, the song debuted at #29 on the week of April 21, 2012. On the week of June 23, 2012, the song reached #1 on the chart becoming his twenty-first song number-one single, replacing "Incondicional" by Prince Royce and was later succeeded by Gocho for "Si Te Digo la Verdad". As a result, Manuelle is currently the artist with the most number-one singles as of June 2012.

== Critical reception ==
Nicole Gonzalez of LatinRecap.com commented "Víctor Manuelle has managed to take the classical Salsa rhythm and mix it with a more Urban flavor with collabs from Reggaetoneros Julio Voltio and duo Jowell and Randy." On the review of the album, Juan Mesa of About.com considered the song to be the most important in the album and praised the use of trombones in the recording. Hector Aviles of Latino Music Café called it a "solid" tune.

== Music video ==
The music video for "Ella Lo Que Quiere Es Salsa" was released on June 5, 2012. It was directed by Steven Tapia and featured 50 dancers choreographed by Tito Ortos in Brooklyn, New York. One of the dancers, Amanda Vilanova also showed her salsa moves. Vilanova was second finalist in Miss World beauty pageant that was held in London, UK in 2011.

== Charts ==
=== Weekly charts ===
Chart (2012)	Position
US Hot Latin Songs (Billboard)	29
US Latin Pop Airplay (Billboard)	33
US Tropical Songs (Billboard)	1

=== Yearly charts ===
Chart (2012)	Position
US Tropical Songs (Billboard)	7

== Certifications ==
Region	Certification	Certified units/sales
United States (RIAA)	Platinum (Latin)	60,000^{‡}
^{‡} Sales+streaming figures based on certification alone.
