= Alice Caymmi =

Brazilian singer and composer

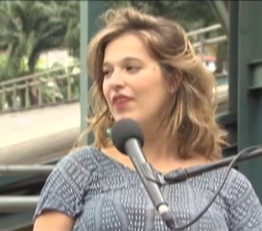
- Alice Caymmi in 2013

Background information
- Born: Alice Malaguti Caymmi; March 17, 1990 (age 36)
- Origin: Rio de Janeiro, Brazil
- Genres: Música popular brasileira
- Occupations: Singer, songwriter
- Instrument: Voice
- Years active: 2012–present
- Labels: Universal Music (2015–present); Kuarup/Sony Music (2012–2014)
- Website: www.rainhadosraios.com

Alice Caymmi (born Alice Malaguti Caymmi on March 17, 1990) is a Brazilian singer and songwriter. She is the granddaughter of Dorival Caymmi, daughter of Danilo and Simone Caymmi and niece of Nana and Dori Caymmi.

== Career ==
Before opting for a musical life, Alice studied law. Afterwards, she studied performing arts at Pontifícia Universidade Católica do Rio de Janeiro. Her first professional recording was at the age of 12 in her aunt Nana's album Desejo, specifically on the track "Seus Olhos", written by her sister Juliana. Shortly after, they performed the song with Nana at a sold-out Canecão. In 2007, she took part of the ending ceremony of the 2007 Pan American Games with her father Danilo.

In 2012, via a partnership between Kuarup and Sony Music, she released her self-titled first album, followed by a number of tours. The album is mainly original except for two cover songs, one originally by Dorival Caymmi and another by Björk.

Two years later, she released her second album, Rainha dos Raios, this time with mostly cover versions and just two new songs, including a partnership with Michael Sullivan. In 2015, her version of "Como Vês" was featured at Rede Globo's miniseries Felizes para Sempre?.

In October 2015, Alice was preparing her first live DVD, directed by São Paulo Fashion Week creator Paulo Borges.

In December 2017, she released the first single of her third album, Alice, due to January 12, 2018. The track is titled "Inocente", was co-written by Ana Carolina and received a promotional video directed by Allexia Galvão.

In 27 May 2019, Caymmi released her fourth album, Electra, in which she sings all tracks accompanied by a piano only. In December of the same year, she released a video directed by Pedro Freire for a version of "Areia Fina", from Electra, remixed by Maffalda. On the same occasion, she announced she would release in the first semester of the next year a sequel to the album titled Elétrika, containing new, pop music created with Rodrigo Gorky.

In January 2020, she released the first single of the album, "A Noite Inteira" (All Night Long), a partnership with com Àttooxxá written by her, Rafa Dias and Wallace "Chibatinha" Carvalho dos Santos and produced by Rodrigo Gorky, Maffalda and Zebu, from Brabo Music.

In February 2020, she released the song "Elétrika", featuring Baianas Ozadas which was part of a campaign by Cemig to alert people on how to prevent electrical accidents during carnival in Belo Horizonte.

In October 2021, she effectively released her fifth album, Imaculada, with almost all-new songs.

== Personal life ==
When asked about her religion, Alice said:

Formally, I never followed any religion. [...] I'm afraid of saying I'm religious, because it foreshadows doctrine. Here's how it goes: I am highly mystical, but I'm no hippie that knows natal chart. I value and admire behavioral archetypes, just like I do with Greek gods and stuff.

Caymmi is bisexual and is married to fellow musician Filipe Castro since 2017.

== Discography ==
=== Studio albums ===
- Alice Caymmi (2012)
- Rainha dos Raios (2014)
- Alice (2018)
- Electra (2019)
- Imaculada (2021)

=== Live albums ===
- Rainha dos Raios (ao Vivo) (2015)

=== EPs ===
- Dizem Que Sou Louca (2019)
