= Por Primera Vez =

Studio album by Camilo
- Released: April 17, 2020
- Recorded: 2019–2020
- Genre: Latin pop; reggaeton
- Length: 30:25
- Label: Sony Music
- Producer: Camilo; Jon Leone; Richi Lopez; Edgar Barrera; Tainy; Andrés Saavedra; Rafa Arcaute

Camilo chronology
Tráfico de Sentimientos (2010)	Por Primera Vez (2020)	Mis Manos (2021)

Singles from Por Primera Vez
- 1. "No Te Vayas" Released: March 29, 2019; 2. "Tutu" Released: August 9, 2019; 3. "La Difícil" Released: December 20, 2019; 4. "Por Primera Vez" Released: March 9, 2020; 5. "Favorito" Released: March 26, 2020; 6. "El Mismo Aire" Released: June 10, 2020

Por Primera Vez (English: For the First Time) is the major-label debut studio album (third overall) by Colombian singer Camilo, released on April 17, 2020, through Sony Music. The album was produced by Camilo himself alongside Mary Conde Sietesuelas, with Edgar Barrera, Tainy, Andrés Saavedra and Rafa Arcaute also appearing in some tracks as producers. It features collaborations with Camilo's wife Evaluna Montaner, Mexican singer Christian Nodal, Puerto Rican singer Pedro Capó and Colombian singer Shakira, the latter two in the song "Tutu" and its remix, respectively.

At the 21st Annual Latin Grammy Awards, the album was nominated for Album of the Year and Best Pop Vocal Album, while the song "Tutu" was nominated for Record of the Year, Song of the Year and Best Pop Song, winning the latter, being Camilo's first Latin Grammy Award, additionally, the song "El Mismo Aire" was also nominated for Song of the Year. The album also received a nomination for Best Latin Pop or Urban Album at the 63rd Annual Grammy Awards.

The album topped the Billboard Latin Pop Albums chart while it peaked at number five on both the Spanish Albums chart and Billboard Top Latin Albums chart.

== Background ==
About the album, Camilo said that it was "handcrafted at home, with my family, and though they call me an artist, I consider myself an artisan, if it wasn't for La Tribu (my fans), if it wasn't for God, there is no chance that I would be where I am today, growing as an artist and as a human being are separate things and they work differently, so in order to be big, one has to be small and feel like they are at all times doing things for the first time (Por Primera Vez).". The main theme of the album is love, with his relationship with his wife, Evaluna Montaner, being one of the main inspirations for the album, Montaner also appears in the title track.

== Singles ==
"No Te Vayas" was released as the first single for the album on March 29, 2019, followed by "Tutu" featuring Pedro Capó, released on August 9, 2019, the latter song was a breakout hit for Camilo, reaching the top position in Argentina and Mexico, as well as peaking at number 16 and 2 at the Billboard Hot Latin Songs and Billboard Latin Pop Song, respectively. Later, on October 15, 2019, a remix of the song was released with Shakira. A third single, "La Difícil" on December 20, 2019. During 2020, three more singles were released, "Por Primera Vez" with Evaluna Montaner on March 9, 2020, "Favorito" on March 26, 2020 and "El Mismo Aire" with Pablo Alborán on June 10, 2020.

== Track listing ==
Por Primera Vez
No.	Title	Writer(s)	Producer(s)	Length
1.	"Medialuna"	Camilo Echeverry	Camilo; Jon Leone; Richi Lopez	3:27
2.	"Si Estoy Contigo"	Jon Leone; Richi Lopez; Echeverry; Juan Morelli	Camilo; Leone; Lopez	2:37
3.	"Favorito"	Edgar Barrera; Echeverry; Leone; Rafa Arcaute	Camilo; Leone; Lopez	3:29
4.	"El Mismo Aire"	Echeverry; Leone; Barrera; Morelli; Lopez	Camilo; Leone; Lopez	3:06
5.	"Por Primera Vez" (featuring Evaluna Montaner)	Leone; Echeverry; Evaluna Montaner; Gabriel Edgar González Pérez; Morelli	Camilo; Leone	3:02
6.	"La Mitad" (featuring Christian Nodal)	Echeverry; Barrera	Echeverry; Barrera	2:57
7.	"No Te Vayas"	Barrera; Marco Masis; Echeverry; Frank Santofimio; Jorge Luis Chacin; Mau Montaner; Ricky Montaner	Tainy; Leone	3:20
8.	"La Difícil"	Andrés Saavedra; Echeverry; Santofimio; Sebastian Obando Giraldo	Andrés Saavera; Leone	2:38
9.	"Tutu" (featuring Pedro Capó)	Leone; Echeverry; Lopez	Lopez; Leone	2:59
10.	"Tutu (Remix)" (featuring Shakira and Pedro Capó)	Leone; Echeverry; Lopez; Shakira	Lopez; Leone; Shakira; Arcaute	2:45
Total length:				30:25

== Charts ==
=== Weekly charts ===
Weekly chart performance for Por Primera Vez
Chart (2020)	Peak position
Spanish Albums (PROMUSICAE)	5
US Top Latin Albums (Billboard)	5
US Latin Pop Albums (Billboard)	1

=== Year-end charts ===
Year-end chart performance for Por Primera Vez
Chart (2020)	Position
Spanish Albums (PROMUSICAE)	34
Chart (2021)	Position
Spanish Albums (PROMUSICAE)	30
Chart (2022)	Position
Spanish Albums (PROMUSICAE)	79

== Certifications ==
Certifications for Por Primera Vez
Region	Certification	Certified units/sales
Brazil (Pro-Música Brasil)	Gold	20,000^{‡}
Mexico (AMPROFON)	Diamond+Platinum+Gold	390,000^{‡}
Spain (PROMUSICAE)	Gold	20,000^{‡}
United States (RIAA)	5× Platinum (Latin)	300,000^{‡}
^{‡} Sales+streaming figures based on certification alone.
