= Vida de Rico =

2020 single by Camilo

Single by Camilo

from the album 'Mis Manos'
- Language: Spanish
- English title: "Rich life"
- Released: September 21, 2020
- Genre: Cumbia, Latin Pop
- Length: 3:04
- Label: Sony Music Latin
- Songwriters: Camilo; Edgar Barrera
- Producers: Camilo Echeverry; Edgar Barrera; Alex "A.C." Castillo

Camilo singles chronology
"El Mismo Aire" (2020)	"Vida de Rico" (2020)	"Bebé" (2020)

Music video
- "Vida de Rico" on YouTube

"Vida de Rico" is a song by the Colombian singer Camilo. Released on 21 September 2020 as the first single from his second studio album Mis Manos (2021). The song became a commercial success that reached the #1 spot of several latin charts.

== Composition and lyrics ==
The song was written by Camilo in collaboration with Edgar Barrera. It is a traditional Colombian cumbia with elements of latin pop. The single, during production, didn't go to the process of readjustment but instead kept the original demo. The lyric is about an artist that although they do not have an economic fortune, can still share all the things that he has to the one who loves him more.

== Reception ==
=== Commercial performance ===
The single, in the United States, reached #1 in the Billboard charts Latin Airplay and Latin Pop Airplay, whereas in the chart Hot Latin Songs the song peaked #8 In the Billboard Global 200 chart, the song peaked at #29. On 4 November 2020, the song reached #1 in the Argentina Hot 100 chart. In Spain, it stayed on the #1 spot for four non-consecutive weeks and remained on the top 10 for 26 weeks, which made the song the second best-selling downloaded song in 2021, behind of "Jerusalema" by Master KG and Nomcebo Zikode.

"Vida de Rico" achieved a successful performance in Latin-American radio stations where the song managed to enter in various Monitor Latino charts. It reached #1 in radio charts of Argentina, Colombia, Peru and El Salvador.

=== Accolades ===
Awards and nominations for "Vida de Rico"
Organization	Year	Category	Result	Ref.
Premios Nuestra Tierra	2021	Song of the Year	Nominated	
Premios Nuestra Tierra	2021	Tropical / Salsa / Cumbia Song	Won	
Premios Nuestra Tierra	2021	Best Song	Nominated	
Premios Nuestra Tierra	2021	Most Favorite Song of the Public	Nominated	
Latino Show Music Awards	2021	Song of the Year	Nominated	
Latino Show Music Awards	2021	Best Pop Urban Song	Nominated	
Premios Juventud	2021	Viral Track of the Year	Nominated	
Premios Juventud	2021	The Traffic Jam	Nominated	
Monitor Latino Music Awards	2021	Best Male Pop Song	Won	
Los 40 Music Awards	2021	Best Song	Nominated	
Latin Grammy Awards	2021	Record of the Year	Nominated	
Latin Grammy Awards	2021	Song of the Year	Nominated	
Latin Grammy Awards	2021	Best Pop Song	Won	
Premios Quiero	2021	Best Pop Video	Won	
Premios Quiero	2021	Best Video of the Year	Won	
Premios Lo Nuestro	2022	Song of the Year	Nominated	
Premios Lo Nuestro	2022	Pop Song of the Year	Nominated	
Premios ASCAP	2022	Special Recognition	Won	

== Music video ==
The music video was directed by Evaluna Montaner and produced by Camilo and Cristian Saumeth under the supervision of Camaleón Music studios. The video shows Camilo and Evaluna, his wife, visiting his first house while in the process of construction and remodeling.

== Charts ==
=== Weekly charts ===
Weekly chart performance for "Vida de Rico"
Chart (2020–2021)	Peak position
Argentina (Monitor Latino)	1
Argentina (Argentina Hot 100)	1
Bolivia (Monitor Latino)	2
Central America (FONOTICA)	7
Chile (Monitor Latino)	2
Colombia (Monitor Latino)	1
Colombia (National Report)	1
Colombia Streaming (Promúsica)	2
Costa Rica (FONOTICA)	6
Costa Rica (Monitor Latino)	1
Dominican Republic (Monitor Latino)	4
Ecuador (Monitor Latino)	1
El Salvador (ASAP EGC)	1
El Salvador (Monitor Latino)	1
Global 200 (Billboard)	29
Guatemala (Monitor Latino)	1
Honduras (Monitor Latino)	6
Latin America (Monitor Latino)	2
Mexico (Monitor Latino)	3
Mexico (Mexico Airplay)	3
Mexico (Mexico Espanol Airplay)	1
Nicaragua (Monitor Latino)	4
Panama (Monitor Latino)	15
Paraguay (Monitor Latino)	3
Peru (Monitor Latino)	1
Peru (UNIMPRO)	3
Puerto Rico (Monitor Latino)	3
Spain (PROMUSICAE)	7
US Bubbling Under Hot 100 (Billboard)	11
US Hot Latin Songs (Billboard)	8
US Latin Airplay (Billboard)	1
US Latin Digital Song Sales (Billboard)	6
US Latin Pop Airplay (Billboard)	1
Uruguay (Monitor Latino)	3
Venezuela (Monitor Latino)	6

=== Monthly charts ===
Monthly chart performance for "Vida de rico"
Chart (2020)	Peak position
Paraguay (SGP)	1
Uruguay (CUD)	7

=== Year-end charts ===
2020 year-end chart performance for "Vida de rico"
Chart (2020)	Position
Argentina (Monitor Latino)	67
Bolivia (Monitor Latino)	25
Colombia (Monitor Latino)	49
Costa Rica (Monitor Latino)	57
Ecuador (Monitor Latino)	41
El Salvador (Monitor Latino)	23
Nicaragua (Monitor Latino)	81
Paraguay (Monitor Latino)	47
Peru (Monitor Latino)	36
Spain (PROMUSICAE)	68
Uruguay (Monitor Latino)	77

2021 year-end chart performance for "Vida de rico"
Chart (2021)	Position
Chile (Monitor Latino)	9
Guatemala (Monitor Latino)	5
Honduras (Monitor Latino)	29
Panama (Monitor Latino)	59
Spain (PROMUSICAE)	17
US Hot Latin Songs (Billboard)	33
Venezuela (Monitor Latino)	24

== Certifications ==
Region	Certification	Certified units/sales
Brazil (Pro-Música Brasil)	Gold	20,000^{‡}
Colombia (ASINCOL)	Platinum	20,000
Mexico (AMPROFON)	2× Diamond+Platinum	1,540,000^{‡}
Spain (PROMUSICAE)	7× Platinum	420,000^{‡}
United States (RIAA)	8× Platinum (Latin)	480,000^{‡}
Streaming
Chile (Profovi)	Platinum	33,240,221
^{‡} Sales+streaming figures based on certification alone.

== Release history ==
Release date and format for "Vida de Rico"
Region	Date	Format	Version	Label	Ref.
Various	September 21, 2020	Digital download; streaming	Original	Sony Music Latin	
