= Mis Manos =

Studio album by Camilo
- Released: March 4, 2021
- Recorded: 2020
- Genre: Latin pop; reggaeton
- Length: 35:35
- Label: Sony Music Latin
- Producer: Camilo; Edgar Barrera; Alex "A.C." Castillo; Los Dos Carnales; Tainy; Nicolás Ramírez

Camilo chronology
Por Primera Vez (2020)	Mis Manos (2021)	De Adentro Pa Afuera (2022)

Singles from Mis Manos
- 1. "Vida de Rico" Released: September 21, 2020; 2. "BEBÉ" Released: November 27, 2020; 3. "Ropa Cara" Released: January 18, 2021; 4. "Machu Picchu" Released: March 1, 2021; 5. "Millones" Released: April 6, 2021; 6. "KESI" Released: July 14, 2021

Mis Manos (English: My Hands) is the second studio album by Colombian singer Camilo, released on March 4, 2022, through Sony Music Latin. It was produced by Camilo himself alongside Edgar Barrera, with Alex "Pedorro" Castillo, Los Dos Carnales, Tainy and Nicolás Ramírez appearing in some tracks as producers. It features collaborations with Los Dos Carnales, Mau y Ricky, Evaluna Montaner and El Alfa.

At the 22nd Annual Latin Grammy Awards, the album was nominated for Album of the Year and won Best Pop Vocal Album while "Vida de Rico" was nominated for Record of the Year and Song of the Year and won Best Pop Song, and "Tuyo y Mío" was nominated for Best Regional Mexican Song. The album was also nominated for Best Latin Pop Album at the 64th Annual Grammy Awards.

The album was certified platinum in both México and United States and peaked at number 5 and 2 at the Top Latin Albums and Latin Pop Albums charts, respectively, the album also peaked at number 173 at the Billboard 200 chart, being Camilo's first appearance in the chart.

== Background ==
The album features an exploration to diverse genres alongside pop music, ranging through cumbia, champeta, corrido, Colombian folk music and reggaeton. Similar to his previous album, Mis Manos deals with themes of love and romanticism, with his relationship with his wife Evaluna Montaner serving as inspiration for the album, Montaner appears in the track "Machu Picchu", Camilo has commented that "the album is a testimony of the way that I live love, the way in which I have discovered myself through the eyes of my wife, the way I have learnt the things that she saw in me and that I was never brave enough to see". The name of the album, translated to "my hands" in English, comes from the self-made nature of the album, according to Camilo "everything on this album is written, produced, recorded, played and crossed out with my hands, as the days go by I am more convinced that God created me with his hands and made me by hand with purpose and intention, and if I am created in his image and likeness, then all of his inheritance is in my creativity, in my intuition and in my hands as an instrument of all that I turn into song".

== Singles ==
The first single for the album was "Vida de Rico", released on September 21, 2020, the song reached number one in Colombia, Argentina and at the Billboard Latin Pop Songs chart. The second single was "BEBÉ" featuring Dominican rapper El Alfa, released on November 27, 2020, a remix of the song with Brazilian singer Gusttavo Lima was released on May 31, 2021. The third single "Ropa Cara" was released on January 18, 2021, the song peaked at number 21 at the Top Latin Songs chart. During 2021, he also released the singles "Machu Picchu", with Evaluna Montaner, "Millones" and "KESI", the latter with a remix with Canadian singer Shawn Mendes, released on July 14, 2021.

== Track listing ==
Mis Manos track listing
No.	Title	Writer(s)	Producer(s)	Length
1.	"Millones"	Camilo Echeverry; Edgar Barrera	Camilo; Edgar Barrera; Alex "A.C." Castillo	3:41
2.	"KESI"	Echeverry; Barrera; Juan Morelli	Camilo; Barrera; Castillo	2:57
3.	"Manos de Tijera"	Echeverry; Barrera	Camilo; Barrera	4:27
4.	"Mareado"	Echeverry; Barrera; Nicolás Ramírez	Camilo; Barrera; Castillo	3:13
5.	"Tuyo y Mío" (featuring Los Dos Carnales)	Echeverry; Barrera; Alfonso de Jesús Quezada Mancha	Camilo; Barrera; Los Dos Carnales	3:20
6.	"Rolex" (featuring Mau y Ricky)	Echeverry; Marco Masis; Mau Montaner; Ricky Montaner	Camilo; Tainy	2:57
7.	"Machu Picchu" (featuring Evaluna Montaner)	Echeverry; Barrera; Danny Ocean; Dav Julca; Evaluna Montaner; Johnny Echo	Camilo; Barrera	2:59
8.	"Ropa Cara"	Echeverry; Barrera	Camilo; Barrera	2:42
9.	"Vida de Rico"	Echeverry; Barrera	Camilo; Barrera	3:04
10.	"BEBÉ" (featuring El Alfa)	Echeverry; Barrera; Masis; Andrés Castro; Emmanuel Herrera	Camilo; Barrera	3:17
11.	"5 pa las 12"	Oswaldo Oropeza	Camilo; Nicolás Ramírez	2:53
Total length:				35:35

== Charts ==
=== Weekly charts ===
Weekly chart performance for Mis Manos
Chart (2021)	Peak position
Spanish Albums (PROMUSICAE)	2
US Billboard 200	173
US Top Latin Albums (Billboard)	5
US Latin Pop Albums (Billboard)	2

=== Year-end charts ===
Year-end chart performance for Mis Manos
Chart (2021)	Position
Spanish Albums (PROMUSICAE)	2
Chart (2022)	Position
Spanish Albums (PROMUSICAE)	14
Chart (2023)	Position
Spanish Albums (PROMUSICAE)	76

== Certifications ==
Certifications for Mis Manos
Region	Certification	Certified units/sales
Brazil (Pro-Música Brasil)	Gold	20,000^{‡}
Mexico (AMPROFON)	Platinum+Gold	210,000^{‡}
Spain (PROMUSICAE)	2× Platinum	80,000^{‡}
United States (RIAA)	5× Platinum (Latin)	300,000^{‡}
^{‡} Sales+streaming figures based on certification alone.
