= 21st Annual Latin Grammy Awards =

Music awards presented Nov 2020

21st Latin Grammy Awards
- Date: November 19, 2020
- Venue: American Airlines Arena, Miami, Florida
- Hosted by: Yalitza Aparicio, Ana Brenda Contreras and Victor Manuelle

Highlights
- Most awards: Natalia Lafourcade and Rosalía (3 each)
- Person of the Year: N/A (see Background)

Television/radio coverage
- Network: TelevisaUnivision

The 21st Annual Latin Grammy Awards were held on Thursday, November 19, 2020 and broadcast on TelevisaUnivision. The 2020 Latin Grammy ceremony was anchored from the American Airlines Arena in Miami, though the health protocols enacted due to the COVID-19 pandemic meant there was no live audience in the venue, and performances were presented from remote locations from many parts of the world. The telecast marked the 21st anniversary of the Latin Grammy Awards and honored musical releases within Latin music released from June 1, 2019 to May 31, 2020. Nominations were announced on September 29.

== Background ==
On March 28, 2020, less than three weeks after the March 11 declaration by the World Health Organization that the COVID-19 outbreak was officially a pandemic, the Latin Recording Academy announced that its annual gala was still set for November 2020.

Starting in 2020, the Latin Grammys would include a category exclusively focused on reggaeton to prevent of the controversies and calls for boycott experienced the year before. Thus, a new category named "Best Reggaeton Performance" was introduced this year.

Also starting with the 2020 awards, the Latin Recording Academy announced that it would stop using the term "urban music" in response to controversies which had led its sister organization, The Recording Academy, to announce changes to the names of some that academy's Grammy Awards categories six months after its own January 2020 awards presentations. "Best Pop/Rock Song" and "Best Rap/Hip Hop Song" replaced the "urban" categories, with the latter one including trap music. The "Best Flamenco Album" category made its return to the Latin Grammys after being erased in 2018, due to the lack of competition.

On August 18, the Latin Recording Academy announced the official date for the gala's celebration and its format. Under the slogan "Music Humanizes Us", the 2020 Latin Grammy Awards was returning to Miami, for the first time since the 2003 ceremony. In that announcement, the Latin Grammys organization stated: "If local conditions are favorable in November, The Latin Academy will consider hosting a live audience telecast composed primarily of nominees, presenters and performers."

In November, due to the ongoing pandemic, the ceremony was held without a live audience in the venue, and featured remote performances from all around the world. As a result of the pandemic, the special awards, namely the Latin Recording Academy Person of the Year, Latin Grammy Lifetime Achievement Award, and the Latin Grammy Trustees Award, were not presented this year.

Originally, Carlos Rivera and Roselyn Sánchez were announced as hosts for the ceremony but Sánchez could not continue as host due to health issues. Later, actresses Yalitza Aparicio and Ana Brenda Contreras were announced as hosts alongside Rivera, but a few days later Rivera cancelled his participation due to a COVID-19 case in his team. Then, singer Victor Manuelle was announced as performer and also host with Aparicio and Contreras.

== Performances ==
| Artist(s) | Song(s) | Ref. |
|---|---|---|
| Rauw Alejandro; Ivy Queen; Victor Manuelle; Ricardo Montaner; Jesús Navarro | Tribute to Héctor Lavoe "El Cantante" | |
| Debi Nova; Raquel Sofía; Alex Cuba | "Amor en Cuarentena" "Esta Situación" | |
| Lupita Infante; Mariachi Sol de México de José Hernández | Tribute to Pedro Infante "Amorcito Corazón" | |
| Karol G | "Tusa" | |
| José Luis Perales | "Y Como es Él" "Te Quiero" | |
| J Balvin | "Rojo" | |
| Guaynaa; Sebastián Yatra | "Chica Ideal" "Three Little Birds" | |
| Alejandro Fernández; Calibre 50; Christian Nodal | "Decepciones" "Ay Ay Ay" "Más No Puedo" | |
| Carla Morrison; Ricky Martin | "Recuerdo" "Tiburones" | |
| Fito Paez; Nathy Peluso | "La Conquista del Espacio" "Buenos Aires" | |
| Pitbull | "I Believe That We Will Win" | |
| Kany García; Nahuel Pennisi; Pedro Capó; Camilo | "Lo que en ti veo" "Titanic" "Tutu" | |
| Los Tigres del Norte | "Tres Veces Mojado" | |
| Bad Bunny | "Bichiyal" "Si Veo a Tu Mamá" | |
| Julio Reyes Copello; Marc Anthony | "Un Amor Eterno" | |
| Anitta | "Mas, que Nada!" "Me Gusta" | |
| Natalia Jimenez; Juanes; Prince Royce; Leslie Grace | Tribute to Julio Iglesias "Hey"; Tribute to Roberto Carlos "Un Gato en la Oscuridad"; Tribute to Juan Luis Guerra "Burbujas de Amor" | |
| Anuel AA | "Estrés Postraumático" "El Manual" | |

== Presenters ==
- Leslie Grace and Prince Royce – presented Best Urban Music Album
- Natalia Jiménez and Sebastián Yatra – presented Best Tropical Song
- Ivy Queen – presented Best Singer-Songwriter Album
- Pedro Capó – presented Best New Artist
- Yalitza Aparicio and Ana Brenda Contreras – presented Best Ranchero/Mariachi Album
- Debi Nova and Alex Cuba – introduced Kany García, Nahuel Pennisi, Pedro Capó and Camilo
- Juanes – presented Record of the Year
- Lin-Manuel Miranda – introduced Bad Bunny
- Kany García – presented Best Pop Song
- Mike Bahía – introduced Anitta
- Ricardo Montaner – presented Song of the Year
- Feid and Greeicy – introduced Anuel AA
- Victor Manuelle – presented Album of the Year

== Winners and nominees ==
The following is the list of nominees.

=== General ===
Record of the Year

- "Contigo" - Alejandro Sanz
  - Julio Reyes Copello & Rafa Sardina, producers; James Fitzpatick, Jan Holzner, Nicolás Ramírez, Julio Reyes Copello & Rafa Sardina, recording engineers; Nicolás Ramírez, mixer; Carlos Hernández Carbonell, mastering engineer
- Anuel AA, Daddy Yankee, Karol G, Ozuna, J Balvin — "China"
  - Marco Masis "Tainy", producer; Luis "Wichie" Ortiz, recording engineer; Luis "Wichie" Ortiz & Juan G. Rivera, mixers; Luis "Wichie" Ortiz & Juan G. Rivera, mastering engineers
- Pablo Alborán — "Cuando estés aquí"
  - Pablo Alborán, record producer; Pablo Alborán, recording engineer; Oscar Clavel, mixer; Oscar Clavel, mastering engineer
- Bad Bunny — "Vete"
  - Cesar Oscar Batista Escalera, Jose Carlos Cruz, Freddy Momtalvo, Ivaniel Ortiz, Edgar Wilmer Semper-Vargas & Xavier Alexis Semper-Vargas, record producers; La Paciencia, recording engineer; Josh Gudwin, mixer; Colin Leonard, mastering engineer
- Bajofondo featuring Cuareim 1080 — "Solari Yacumenza"
  - Juan Campodónico & Gustavo Santaolalla, record producers; Julio Berta, recording engineer; Juan Campodónico, Aníbal Kerpel & Gustavo Santaolalla, mixers; Tom Baker, mastering engineer
- J Balvin — "Rojo"
  - Alejandro "Sky" Ramírez & Taiko, record producers; Joel Iglesias, recording engineer; Josh Gudwin, mixer; Colin Leonard, mastering engineer
- Camilo featuring Pedro Capó — "Tutu"
  - Jon Leone, Richi López & George Noriega, record producers; Camilo, Jon Leone, Richi López & George Noriega, recording engineers; Juan G. Rivera, mixer; Mike Bozzi, mastering engineer
- Kany García and Nahuel Pennisi — "Lo que en ti veo"
  - Julio Reyes Copello, record producer; Sebastián Ezequiel Sanabria, Carlos Fernando López, Nicolás Ramírez, Julio Reyes Copello, Marcos Sánchez & Daniel Uribe, recording engineers; Marcos Sánchez, mixer; Gene Grimaldi, mastering engineer
- Karol G and Nicki Minaj — "Tusa"
  - Daniel Oviedo Echevarria, record producer; Daniel Oviedo Echevarria, recording engineer; Rob Kinelski, mixer; Dave Kutch, mastering engineer
- Residente — "René"
  - Residente, record producer; Phil Joly & Carlos Velázquez, recording engineers; Beatriz Artola, mixer; Ted Jensen, mastering engineer

Album of the Year

Natalia Lafourcade — Un Canto por México, Vol. 1

Kiko Campos, album producer; José Luis Fernández & Rubén López Arista, album recording engineers; Rubén López Arista, album mixer; Natalia Lafourcade, songwriter; Michael Fuller, album mastering engineer

- Bad Bunny — YHLQMDLG
  - Henry De La Prida & Marco Masis "Tainy", album producers; La Paciencia, album recording engineer; Josh Gudwin, album mixer; Bad Bunny, songwriter; Colin Leonard, album mastering engineer
- J Balvin and Bad Bunny — Oasis
  - Marco Masis "Tainy" & Alejandro "Sky" Ramírez, album producers; Joel Iglesias, Marco Masis "Tainy", Alejandro "Sky" Ramírez & Roberto Rosado, album recording engineers; Josh Gudwin, album mixer; Bad Bunny, J Balvin, Marco Masis "Tainy" & Alejandro "Sky" Ramírez, songwriters; Colin Leonard, album mastering engineer
- J Balvin — Colores
  - Alejandro "Sky" Ramírez, album producer; Joel Iglesias, album recording engineer; Josh Gudwin, album mixer; J Balvin, Michael Brun, Rene Cano & Alejandro"Sky" Ramírez, songwriters; Colin Leonard, album mastering engineer
- Camilo — Por Primera Vez
  - Camilo, Jon Leone, Richi López & Ricardo Montaner, album producers; Jon Leone & Richi López, album recording engineers; Édgar Barrera, Camilo, Jon Leone & Richi López, songwriters; Mike Bozzi, album mastering engineer
- Kany García — Mesa Para Dos
  - Julio Reyes Copello, album producer; Nicolás Ramírez, Julio Reyes Copello & Daniel Uribe, album recording engineers; Nicolás Ramírez & Marcos Sánchez, album mixers; Kany García, songwriter; Gene Grimaldi, album mastering engineer
- Jesse & Joy — Aire (Versión Día)
  - Charlie Heat, Jesse Huerta & Martin Terefe, album producers; Oskar Winberg, album recording engineer; Josh Gudwin, album mixer; Jason Boyd & Jesse & Joy, songwriters; Colin Leonard, album mastering engineer
- Ricky Martin — Pausa
  - Julio Reyes Copello & Jean Rodríguez, album producers; Nicolás De La Espriella, Enrique Larreal & Julio Reyes Copello, album recording engineers; Jaycen Joshua, album mixer; Ricky Martin & Danay Suárez, songwriters; Felipe Tichauer, album mastering engineer
- Fito Páez — La Conquista del Espacio
  - Gustavo Borner, Diego Olivero & Fito Paez, album producers; Gustavo Borner & Phil Levine, album recording engineers; Gustavo Borner, album mixer; Fito Paez, songwriter; Justin Moshkevich, album mastering engineer
- Carlos Vives — Cumbiana
  - Andrés Leal, Martín Velilla & Carlos Vives, album producers; Andrés Borda, Nicolas Cajamarca, Jorge Corredor, Daniel Cortés, Chris Crawford, Einar Escaf, Sancho Gómez Escolar, Lobzan Graciani, Andrés Leal, Harbey Marín, Dave Rowland & Martín Velilla, album recording engineers; Manny Marroquin, album mixer; Carlos Vives, songwriter; Emerson Mancini, album mastering engineer

Song of the Year

- "René"
  - Residente, songwriter (Residente)
- "ADMV"
  - Vicente Barco, Édgar Barrera, Maluma & Stiven Rojas, songwriters (Maluma)
- "Bonita"
  - Juanes, Mauricio Rengifo, Andrés Torres & Sebastián Yatra, songwriters (Juanes and Sebastian Yatra)
- "Codo con codo"
  - Jorge Drexler, songwriter (Jorge Drexler)
- "El Mismo Aire"
  - Édgar Barrera, Camilo, Jon Leone, Richi López & Juan Morelli, songwriters (Camilo)
- "For Sale"
  - Alejandro Sanz & Carlos Vives, songwriters (Alejandro Sanz and Carlos Vives)
- "#ElMundoFuera" (Improvisación)
  - Alejandro Sanz, songwriter (Alejandro Sanz)
- "Lo que en ti veo"
  - Kany García, songwriter (Kany García & Nahuel Pennisi)
- "Tiburones"
  - Oscar Hernández & Pablo Preciado, songwriters (Ricky Martin)
- "Tusa"
  - Kevyn Mauricio Cruz Moreno, Karol G, Nicki Minaj & Daniel Oviedo Echavarría, songwriters (Karol G and Nicki Minaj)
- "Tutu"
  - Camilo, Jon Leone & Richi López, songwriters (Camilo featuring Pedro Capó)

Best New Artist

- Mike Bahía
- Anuel AA
- Rauw Alejandro
- Cazzu
- Conociendo Rusia
- Soy Emilia
- Kurt
- Nicki Nicole
- Nathy Peluso
- Pitizion
- WOS

=== Pop ===
Best Pop Vocal Album

Ricky Martin — Pausa

- Aitana — Spoiler
- Beret — Prisma
- Camilo — Por Primera Vez
- Juanes — Más futuro que pasado

Best Traditional Pop Vocal Album

Andrés Cepeda and Fonseca — Compadres

- Reyli Barba — La Metamorfosis
- Andrés Cepeda — Trece
- Gaby Moreno and Van Dyke Parks — ¡Spangled!
- José Luis Perales — Mirándote a los Ojos

Best Pop Song

"Tutu" — Camilo, Jon Leone & Richi López, songwriters (Camilo featuring Pedro Capó)

- "Amor en Cuarentena" — Raquel Sofía, songwriter (Raquel Sofía)
- "Bonita" — Juanes, Mauricio Rengifo, Andrés Torres & Sebastián Yatra, songwriters (Juanes and Sebastian Yatra)
- "Cuando estés aquí" — Pablo Alborán, songwriter (Pablo Alborán)
- "Una vez más" — Elsa Carvajal, Grettel Garibaldi, Susana Isaza & Ximena Sariñana, songwriters (Ximena Sariñana)

=== Urban ===
Best Urban Fusion/Performance

Rosalía and Ozuna — "Yo x Ti, Tu x Mi"

- Anuel AA, Daddy Yankee, Karol G, Ozuna, J Balvin — "China"
- Bad Bunny, Duki and Pablo Chill-E — "Hablamos Mañana"
- J Balvin — "Azul"
- Ricky Martin, Residente and Bad Bunny — "Cántalo"

Best Reggaeton Performance

Bad Bunny — "Yo Perreo Sola"

- J Balvin — "Morado"
- DJ Snake and J Balvin featuring Tyga — "Loco Contigo"
- Feid and Justin Quiles — "Porfa"
- Guaynaa featuring Cauty — "Chicharrón"
- Ozuna — "Te Soñé de Nuevo"
- Sech and Ozuna — "Si Te Vas"

Best Urban Music Album

Colores — J Balvin

- Emmanuel — Anuel AA
- YHLQMDLG — Bad Bunny
- Oasis — J Balvin and Bad Bunny
- FERXXO (VOL. 1: M.O.R) — Feid
- Nibiru — Ozuna
- 1 of 1 — Sech
- Easy Money Baby — Myke Towers

Best Rap/Hip Hop Song

"Antes Que El Mundo Se Acabe" — Residente, songwriter (Residente)

- "Baile del Dinero" — Anuel AA, songwriter (Anuel AA)
- "Goteo" — Duki, songwriter (Duki)
- "Kemba Walker" — Eladio Carrión and Bad Bunny, songwriters (Eladio Carrión and Bad Bunny)
- "Medusa" — Anuel AA, J Balvin, Jhay Cortez, Josias De La Cruz, Misael De La Cruz, Sergio Roldan, Elvin Roubert & Nydia Yera, songwriters (Jhay Cortez, Anuel AA & J Balvin)

Best Urban Song

"Yo x Ti, Tu x Mi" — Pablo Diaz-Reixa "El Guincho", Ozuna and Rosalía, songwriters (Rosalía & Ozuna)

- "Adicto" — Anuel AA, Jhay Cortez, Marco Masis "Tainy" & Ozuna, songwriters (Tainy, Anuel AA y Ozuna)
- "Muchacha" — Alejandro "Pututi" Arce, Ángel Alberto Arce, Luis Eduardo Cedeno Konig "Pucho", Roque Alberto Cedeno Konig "Tucutu", Gente De Zona, Paul Irizarry Suau "Echo", Andrea Mangiamanchi "Elena Rose", Daniel Joel Márquez Díaz, Yasmil Jesús Marrufo & Juan Morelli, songwriters (Gente De Zona y Becky G)
- "Rave de Favela" — Anitta, Tynashe Beam, Diplo, Eric Alberto-Lopez, MC Lan & Tropkillaz, songwriters (MC Lan, Anitta, BEAM and Major Lazer)
- "Rojo" — J Balvin, O 'Neill, Justin Quiles, Alejandro "Sky" Ramírez & Taiko, songwriters (J Balvin)

=== Rock ===
Best Rock Album

¿Dónde jugaran lxs niñxs? (Desde el Palacio de los Deportes) — Molotov

- Jueves — El Cuarteto de Nos
- Seremos Primavera — Eruca Sativa
- Uncotrecua — Miguel Mateos
- Incomunicación — Vetamadre

Best Rock Song

"Biutiful" — Mon Laferte, songwriter (Mon Laferte)

- "Bola de Fuego" — Eduardo Ibeas, Felipe Ilabaca & Cristian Moraga, songwriters (Chancho en Piedra)
- "Creo" — Eruca Sativa, songwriters (Eruca Sativa)
- "Mario Neta" — Roberto Musso, songwriter (El Cuarteto de Nos)
- "Yo Me Los Merezco" — Buika, Drago, Carlos Santana, Stoneface & Jay U Xperience, songwriters (Santana featuring Buika)

Best Pop/Rock Album

La Conquista del Espacio — Fito Páez

- La Que Manda — Gina Chavez
- Cabildo y Juramento — Conociendo Rusia
- Acabadabra — Juan Galeano
- Pangea — Los Mesoneros

Best Pop/Rock Song

"La Canción de las Bestias" — Fito Páez, songwriter (Fito Páez)

- "Dolerme" — Pablo Diaz-Reixa, Frank Dukes, Rosalía & Matthew Tavares, songwriters (Rosalía)
- "Quiero que me Llames" — Conociendo Rusia, songwriter (Conociendo Rusia)
- "Quiero Vivir" — Draco Rosa & Jaime Sabines, songwriters (Draco Rosa)
- "Últimas Palabras" — Los Mesoneros, songwriters (Los Mesoneros)

=== Alternative ===
Best Alternative Music Album

Sobrevolando — Cultura Profética

- Disco Estimulante — Hello Seahorse!
- 2030 — LOUTA
- Miss Colombia — Lido Pimienta
- Ubicación en Tiempo Real — Barbi Recanati

Best Alternative Song

"En Cantos" — Ismael Cancel, Ile and Natalia Lafourcade, songwriters (Ile & Natalia Lafourcade)

- "Buenos Aires" — Rafa Arcaute, Pedro Campos and Nathy Peluso, songwriters (Nathy Peluso)
- "Caracoles" — Wilberto Rodríguez, songwriter (Cultura Profética)
- "Carapazón" — Eruca Sativa, songwriters (Eruca Sativa)
- "Chilango Blues" — Mon Laferte, songwriter (Mon Laferte)

=== Tropical ===
Best Salsa Album

40 — Grupo Niche

- 40 Años de Power — Luisito Ayala and La Puerto Rican Power
- Tentaciones Vol. 1 — Charlie Cruz
- Memorias de Navidad — Víctor Manuelle
- Un Gallo para la Historia — Tito Rojas

Best Cumbia/Vallenato Album

Sigo Cantando al Amor (Deluxe) — Jorge Celedón and Sergio Luis Rodríguez

- Por el Mundo Entero — Binomio de Oro
- Dale Play — Kvrass
- Voz de Mujer — Karen Lizarazo
- La Cumbia Stars Vol. 2 — Los Cumbia Stars

Best Merengue/Bachata Album

Ahora — Eddy Herrera

Larimar — Daniel Santacruz

- The Genetics of Bachata — José Manuel Calderón
- Bailando Contigo — Manny Cruz
- Los Conquistadores — Grupo Manía

Best Traditional Tropical Album

Ícono — Orquesta Aragón

- Este es Nuestro Changüí — Changüí De Guantánamo
- Pa'Lante — Ernesto Fernández
- Failde con Tumbao — Orquesta Failde
- Soy Puro Teatro - Homenaje a La Lupe — Mariaca Semprún

Best Contemporany Tropical/Tropical Fusion Album

Cumbiana — Carlos Vives

- Energía Para Regalar — El Caribefunk
- Mi Derriengue — Riccie Oriach
- Mariposas — Omara Portuondo
- Alter Ego — Prince Royce

Best Tropical Song

"Canción para Rubén" — Rubén Blades and Carlos Vives, songwriters (Carlos Vives & Rubén Blades)

- "Búscame" — Kany García and Carlos Vives, songwriters (Kany García and Carlos Vives)
- "Imaginarme sin Ti" — Elvis Crespo & Maribel Vega, songwriters (Elvis Crespo and Manny Cruz)
- "Quédate" — Paula Arenas, Debi Nova & Juan Pablo Vega, songwriters (Debi Nova and Pedro Capó)
- "Y Basta Ya" — Pavel Nuñez, songwriter (Pavel Nuñez)

=== Songwriter ===
Best Singer-Songwriter Album

Mesa Para Dos — Kany García

- Sublime — Alex Cuba
- Reciente (Adelanto) — El David Aguilar
- 3:33 — Debi Nova
- Después de Todo — Yordano

=== Regional Mexican ===
Best Ranchero/Mariachi Album

Hecho en México — Alejandro Fernández

- Antología de la Música Ranchera — Aida Cuevas
- A Los 4 Vientos Vol. 1 "Ranchero" — Eugenia León
- Bailando Sones y Huapangos con el Mariachi Sol de México de José Hernández — Mariachi Sol De Mexico De José Hernández
- AYAYAY! — Christian Nodal

Best Banda Album

Playlist — Chiquis

- Te Encontré — Banda La Ejecutiva De Mazatlán Sinaloa
- Al Rey José Alfredo Jiménez — Banda Lirio
- Labios Mentirosos — La Arrolladora Banda El Limón de René Camacho
- Salud Por Nuestro 25 Aniversario — La Séptima Banda

Best Tejano Album

Live in México — La Mafia

- Pa'La Pista y Pa'l Pisto, Vol. 1 — El Plan
- 25th Anniversary Contigo — Jay Perez and The Band
- Película, Vol. 1 — Siggno
- It's Time — South Tx Homies

Best Norteño Album

Los Tigres del Norte at Folsom Prison — Los Tigres Del Norte

- De Terán para el Mundo — Buyuchek, La Abuela Irma Silva
- Simplemente Gracias — Calibre 50
- A Los 4 Vientos Vol. 2 "Norteño" — Eugenia León
- La Historia Continúa — Los Cardenales de Nuevo León

Best Regional Song

"Mi Religión" — Natalia Lafourcade, songwriter (Natalia Lafourcade)

- "Ayayay!" — Christian Nodal, songwriter (Christian Nodal)
- "Caballero" — José Luis Roma, songwriter (Alejandro Fernández)
- "Dejaré" — Lupita Infante & Luciano Luna, songwriters (Lupita Infante)
- "#Hashtag" — Gabriel Flores, Wences Romo & Jesus Turner, songwriters (Siggno)

=== Instrumental ===
Best Instrumental Album

Terra — Daniel Minimalia

- Plays Daniel Figueiredo — Leo Amuedo
- Cartografías — Caetano Brasil
- Sotavento — Compasses
- Festejo — Yamandu Costa featuring Marcelo Jiran

=== Traditional ===
Best Folk Album

A Capella: Grabado en Casa Durante la Cuarentena — Susana Baca

- Historias Cantadas — Gaiteros De Pueblo Santo
- Toño García: El último Cacique — Los Gaiteros de San Jacinto
- Quinteto con Voz — Quinteto Leopoldo Federico
- Aguije — Tierra Adentro

Best Tango Album

Fuelle y Cuerda — Gustavo Casenave Quartet

- Contemporary Tango Trilogy — Alejandro Fasanini
- Tango Argentino: Gardel y Piazzella — Jorge Calandrelli
- Comme Il Faut — Pablo Estigarribia, Victor Lavallen y Horacio Cabarcos.
- Tango Sacro — Rodolfo Mederos

Best Flamenco Album

Flamenco sin Fronteras — Antonio Rey

- Quimeras del Tiempo "Ilus3" — Ezequiel Benitez
- Tardo Antiguo — Antonio Campos
- Vivir — Naike Ponce
- Que Suene el Cante — Antonio Reyes

=== Jazz ===
Best Latin Jazz/Jazz Album

Puertos: Music from International Waters — Emilio Solla Tango Jazz Orchestra

- Tradiciones — Afro-Peruvian Jazz Orchestra
- Antidote — Chick Corea & The Spanish Heart Band
- Carib — David Sánchez
- Sonero: The Music of Ismael Rivera — Miguel Zenón

=== Christian ===
Best Christian Album (Spanish Language)

Soldados — Alex Campos

- Caminemos con Jesús — Tony Alonso
- Único — Amalfi
- Atmósfera — Arthur Callazans
- ¿Quién Dijo Miedo? — Gilberto Daza
- A La Medianoche — Elevation Worship
- Hay Más — Hillsong Worship
- Origen y Esencia — Jesús Adrián Romero

Best Christian Album (Portuguese Language)

Reino — Aline Barros

- Catarse: Lado A — Daniela Araújo
- Profundo — Ministério Mergulhar
- Maria Passa À Frente — Padre Marcelo Rossi
- Memórias II (Ao Vivo em Belo Horizonte/2019) — Eli Soares

=== Portuguese Language ===
Best Portuguese Language Contemporary Pop Album

Apká! — Céu

- N — AnaVitória
- Enquanto Estamos Distantes — As Bahias e a Cozinha Mineira
- Guaia — Marcelo Jeneci
- Eu Feat. Você — Melim

Best Portuguese Language Rock or Alternative Album

AmarElo — Emicida

- Little Electric Chicken Heart — Ana Frango Elétrico
- Letrux Ao Prantos — Letrux
- Universo Do Canto Falado — Rapadura
- Na Mão as Flores — Suricata

Best Samba/Pagode Album

Samba Jazz de Raiz, Cláudio Jorge 70 — Cláudio Jorge

- Mangueira - A Menina dos Meus Olhos — Maria Bethânia
- Martinho 8.0 - Bandeira da Fé: Um Concerto Pop-Clássico (Ao vivo) — Martinho da Vila
- Fazendo Samba — Moacyr Luz e Samba do Trabalhador
- Mais Feliz — Zeca Pagodinho

Best MPB (Musica Popular Brasileira) Album

Belo Horizonte — Toninho Horta & Orquestra Fantasma

- O Amor no Caos Volume 2 — Zeca Baleiro
- Bloco Na Rua (Deluxe) — Ney Matogrosso
- Planeta Fome — Elza Soares
- Caetano Veloso & Ivan Sacerdote — Caetano Veloso and Ivan Sacerdote

Best Sertaneja Music Album

Origens (Ao vivo em Sete Lagoas, Brazil/2019) — Paula Fernandes

- #Isso é Churrasco (Ao vivo) [Deluxe] — Fernando & Sorocaba
- Livre Vol. 1 — Lauana Prado
- Churrasco Do Teló Vol. 2 — Michel Teló
- Por Mais Beijos Ao Vivo (Ao vivo) — Zé Neto & Cristiano

Best Portuguese Language Roots Album

Veia Nordestina — Mariana Aydar

- Aqui Está-se Sossegado — Camané & Mário Laginha
- Acaso Casa Ao Vivo — Mariene De Castro e Almério
- Targino Sem Limites — Targino Gondim
- Obatalá - Uma Homenagem a Mãe Carmen — Grupo Ofa
- Autêntica — Margareth Menezes

Best Portuguese Language Song

"Abricó-de-Macaco" — Francisco Bosco and João Bosco, songwriters (João Bosco)

- "A Tal Canção Pra Lua (Microfonado)" — Vitor Kley, songwriter (Vitor Kley & Samuel Rosa)
- "Amarelo (Sample: Sujeito de Sorte - Belchior)" — Dj Duh, Emicida and Felipe Vassão, songwriters (Emicida featuring Majur & Pabllo Vittar)
- "Libertação" — Russo Passapusso, songwriter (Elza Soares and BaianaSystem featuring Virgínia Rodrigues)
- "Pardo" — Caetano Veloso, songwriter (Céu)

=== Children's ===
Best Latin Children’s Album

Canta y Juega — Tina Kids

- Viva la Fiesta — Colegio de Música de Medellín
- Paseo Lunar — The Lucky Band
- Artistas de Profesión — Sophia
- Sonidos que Cuentan — Veleta Roja

=== Classical ===
Best Classical Album

Eternal Gratitude — Paulina Leisring & Domingo Pagliuca; Samuel Pilafian, album producer

- José Antônio de Almeida Prado: Piano Concerto No. 1 - Aurora - Concerto Fribourgeois — Fabio Mechetti, Conductor, Minas Gerais Philharmonic Orchestra & Sonia Rubinsky, Soloist; Ulrich Schneider, album producer
- King Mangoberry — Ricardo Lorenz, Michigan State University Wind Symphony, Manuel Alejandro Rangel, Maracas & Kevin L. Sedatole, Conductor; Sergei Kvitko & David Thornton, album producers
- La Voz del Ave — Eddie Mora; Carlos Chaves & Eddie Mora, album producers
- The Juliet Letters — Elena Rivera y El Cuarteto Latinoamericano; Jc Vertti, album producer

Best Classical Contemporary Composition

"Sacre" — Carlos Fernando López & José Valentino, composers (Carlos Fernando López)

- "Dues Peces Per a Piano" — Joan Magrané, composer (Noelia Rodiles)
- "Jose Serebrier: Variaciones Sinfónicas sobre Bach para Piano y Orquesta" — José Serebrier, composer (José Serebrier, Alexandre Kantorow & RTÉ National Symphony Orchestra)
- "Pataruco" — Ricardo Lorenz, composer (Ricardo Lorenz, Kevin L. Sedatole Conducting Michigan State University Wind Symphony)
- "Sine Nomine" — Eddie Mora, composer (Eddie Mora)

=== Arrangement ===
Best Arrangement

"La Flor de la Canela"

Lorenzo Ferrero, arranger (Afro-Peruvian Jazz Orchestra)

- "Te Extraño"
  - Daniel Barón, arranger (Dani Barón)
- "Asas Fechadas"
  - John Beasley & Maria Mendes, arrangers (Maria Mendes Featuring Metropole Orkest & John Beasley)
- "Bésame Mucho"
  - Ariel García & Carlos Peña, arrangers (Carlos Peña y Su Big Band & Daniela Calvario)
- "Guapanguito"
  - Rosino Serrano, arranger (Rosino Serrano & Orquesta Moderna Featuring Gianluca Littera & Alex Mercado)

=== Recording Package ===
Best Recording Package

Soy Puro Teatro - Homenaje a La Lupe

Pedro Fajardo, art director (Mariaca Semprún)

- Jinetes del Apocalipsis
  - Victor Ricardo Aguilera Luna & Daniela Herrera Ramírez, art directors (Alejandro de la Garza)
- Lado A
  - Lucia Arias, Edgar Guerra & Fabli Soto, art directors (Alerta Rocket)
- MSDL - Canciones dentro de canciones
  - Vetusta Morla & Pequeño Salto Mortal, art directors (Vetusta Morla)
- Salto al Color
  - Eva Amaral, Xavi Blanco & Charis Tsavis, art directors (Amaral)

=== Production ===
Best Engineered Album

3:33

Daniel Bitrán Arizpe, Daniel Dávila, Justin Moshkevich, George Noriega, Erick Roman, Paul Rubinstein & JC Vertti, engineers; Miles Comaskey, Najeeb Jones & Tony Maserati, mixers; Dale Becker, mastering engineer (Debi Nova)

- Aire (Versión Día)
  - Eduardo Del Aguila, Keith Gretlein, Julian Prindle, Curt Schneider, Sasha Sirota & Oskar Winberg, engineers; Josh Gudwin, mixer; Colin Leonard, mastering engineer (Jesse & Joy)
- Apká!
  - Alexandre Fontanetti, Diogo Poças & Pupillo, engineers; Mike Cresswell, mixer; Felipe Tichauer, mastering engineer (Céu)
- Quimera
  - Mon Dvy, Alex Ferrer, Diogo Guerra, Felipe Guevara, Innercut, Red Mojo, Stego & Filipe Survival, mixers; Alex Ferrer & Carlos Hernández Carbonell, mastering engineers (Alba Reche)
- Sublime
  - John "Beetle" Bailey, engineer; John "Beetle" Bailey, mixer; Harry Hess, mastering engineer (Alex Cuba)

Producer of the Year

Andrés Torres and Mauricio Rengifo

- A Dónde Vamos (Morat)
- Cartagena (Fonseca and Silvestre Dangond)
- Colegio (Cali y El Dandee)
- Falta Amor (Sebastián Yatra, Ricky Martin)
- Girasoles (Luis Fonsi)
- Infinito (Andrés Cepeda and Jesse & Joy)
- + (Aitana and Cali y El Dandee)
- Mi Otra Mitad (Manuel Medrano)
- Minifalda (Greeicy and Juanes)
- Perdiendo La Cabeza (Carlos Rivera, Becky G and Pedro Capó)
- Recuerdo (Tini, Mau y Ricky)
- Runaway (Sebastián Yatra, Daddy Yankee, Natti Natasha and Jonas Brothers)
- TBT (Sebastián Yatra, Rauw Alejandro, Manuel Turizo)

- Rafa Arcaute
  - Buena (Manuel Medrano)
  - Buenos Aires (Nathy Peluso)
  - Business Woman (Nathy Peluso)
  - Copa Glasé (Nathy Peluso)
  - La Mentira (Dani Martín featuring Joaquín Sabina)
  - "Laligera" (Lali)
  - Los Huesos (Dani Martín and Juanes)
  - No Se Perdona (Rels B y Nathy Peluso)
  - Quiero Vivir (Draco Rosa)
  - Tutu (Remix) (Camilo, Shakira and Pedro Capó)
- Eudardo Cabra "Visitante"
  - Mi Derriengue (Riccie Oriach)
  - Orígenes (Sotomayor)
  - Que Empiece El Juego (El Cuarteto de Nos)
  - Tiburones En El Bosque (El Cuarteto de Nos)
- Pablo Díaz-Reixa "El Guincho"
  - A Palé (Rosalía)
  - Dio$ No$ Libre Del Dinero (Rosalía)
  - Goteo (Paloma Mami)
  - Juro Que (Rosalía)
  - Me Quedo (Aitana, Lola Índigo)
  - Yalo Yale (Dellafuente)
  - Yo X Ti, Tu X Mi (Rosalía and Ozuna)
- George Noriega
  - Amor y Traición (Cabas)
  - Mundo Paralelo (Monsieur Periné, Pedro Capó)
  - No Ha Parado De Llover (Maná and Sebastián Yatra)
  - No Le Llames Amor (Yuridia)
  - No Pienso Volver (Ednita Nazario)
  - No Vuelvas (Ednita Nazario)
  - Puta (J Mena)
  - Te Dejo Ir (Andrés Cepeda)
  - Vamos A Mi Ritmo (Lasso and Isabela Souza)

=== Music video ===
Best Short Form Music Video

"TKN" — Rosalía and Travis Scott

Canadá, video director; Oscar Romagosa & Laura Serra Estorch, video producers

- "Saci (Remix)" — BaianaSystem and Tropkillaz
  - Rafael Kent, video director; Tânia Assumpção & Rafael Marquez, video producers
- "Rojo" — J Balvin
  - Colin Tilley, video director; Jamee Ranta, video producer
- "Cubana" — Biyolt
  - Gabriel Augusto & Quemuel Cornelius, video directors; Francesco Civita & Henrique Danieletto, video producers
- "Para Ya" — Porter
  - Alexis Gómez, video director; Michelle Lacoste, video producer

Best Long Form Music Video

El Mundo Perdido de Cumbiana — Carlos Vives

Carlos Felipe Montoya, video director; Isabel Cristina Vásquez, video producer

- Una Vuelta al Sol — Amaia
  - Marc Pujolar, video director; Júlia Orbegoso & David Serrano, video producers
- The Warrior Women of Afro-Peruvian Music — Just Play Peru
  - Matt Geraghty, Araceli Poma & Daniel Thissen, video directors; Matt Geraghty & Araceli Poma, video producers
- Los Tigres del Norte at Folsom Prison — Los Tigres del Norte
  - Tim Donahue, video director; Ilan Arboleda, Zach Horowitz, Los Tigres Del Norte & Jessicya Materano, video producers
- Relato de la Mmemoria Futuro — Siddharta
  - Arturo Fabián De La Fuente & Cristóbal González Camarena, video directors; Arturo Fabián De La Fuente & Cristóbal González Camarena, video producers

=== Special awards ===
Leading Ladies of Entertainment

- Selena Gomez
- Angela N. Martinez
- Goyo
- María Elena Salinas
