= Latin Grammy Award for Best Pop Song =

Music award

- Awarded for: quality pop music songs
- Country: United States
- Presented by: The Latin Recording Academy
- First award: 2019
- Currently held by: Noah Goldstein, David Rodríguez, Rosalía, Ryan Tedder & Dylan Wiggins for "La Perla" (2026)
- Website: latingrammy.com

The Latin Grammy Award for Best Pop Song is an honor presented annually at the Latin Grammy Awards, a ceremony that recognizes excellence and promotes a wider awareness of cultural diversity and contributions of Latin recording artists in the United States and internationally.

According to the Latin Grammy category description guide it is designed for new songs that contain 51% of the lyrics in Spanish and it is awarded to the songwriter(s). Instrumental recordings, cover songs, remixes and interpolation/sampling recordings are not eligible for the category. It must be a completely new song.

It was introduced in 2019 at the 20th Annual Latin Grammy Awards, with Spanish singer Alejandro Sanz and American singer Camila Cabello being the inaugural winners for the song "Mi Persona Favorita". Colombian singer Camilo is the only composer to receive the award more than once with two consecutive wins.

== Recipients ==
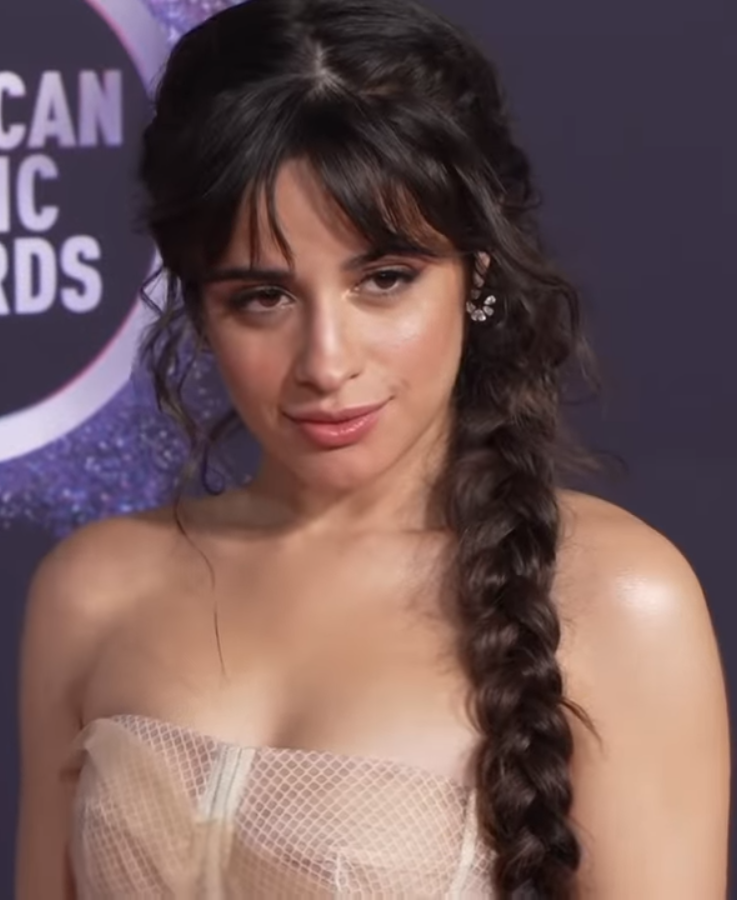
Camila Cabello was one of the first recipients of the awards in 2019 alongside Alejandro Sanz.

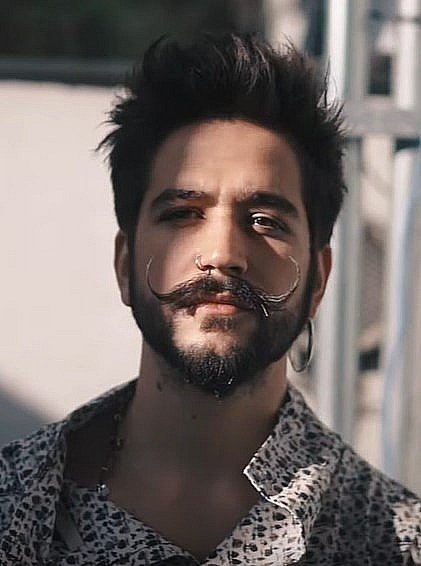
Colombian singer Camilo has won the award twice.

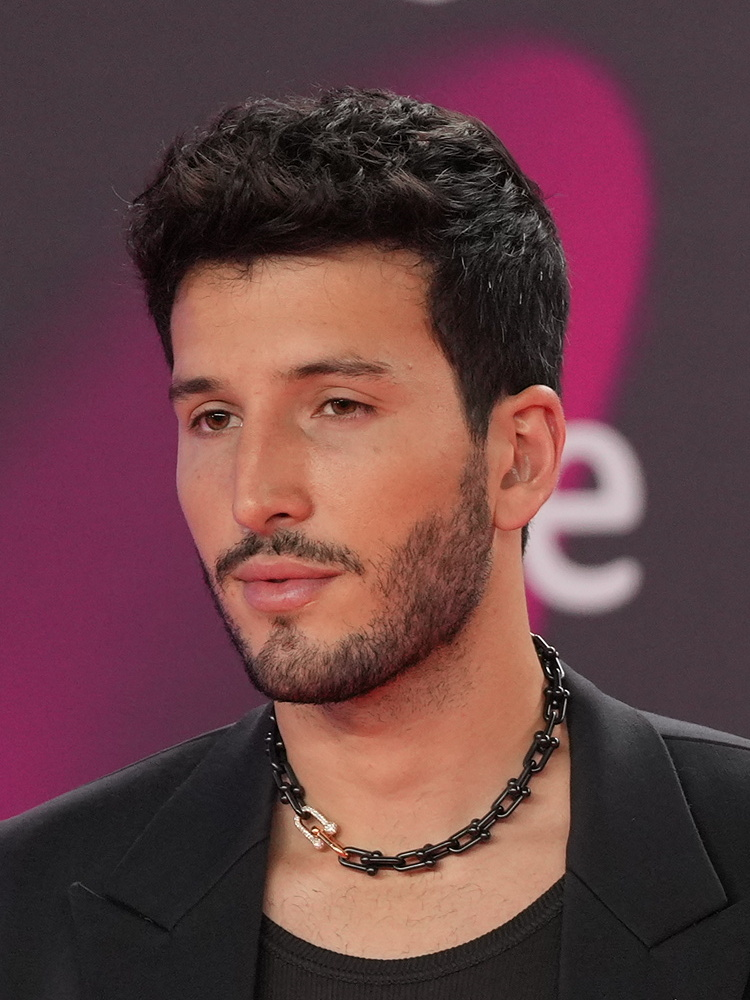
Sebastián Yatra was one of the winners in 2022.

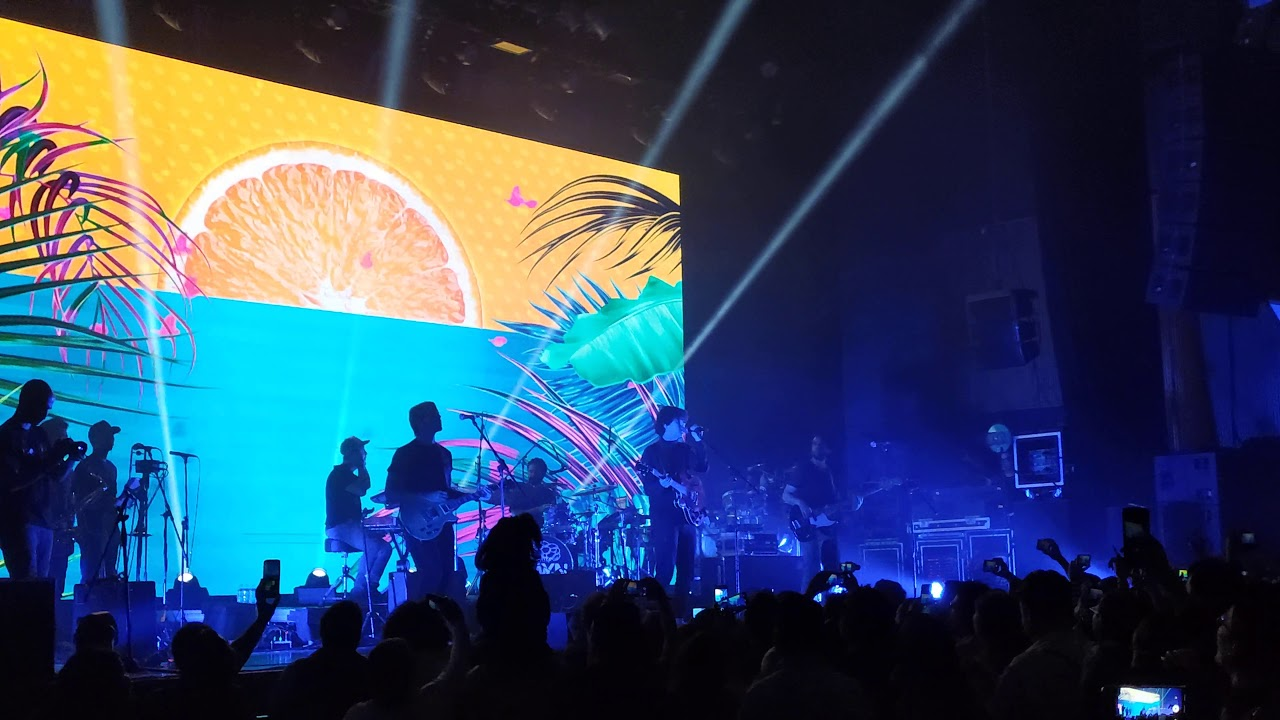
Venezuelan band Rawayana won in 2024.

Year	Songwriter(s)	Work	Performing artist(s)^{[II]}	Nominees	Ref.
2019	Alejandro Sanz and Camila Cabello	"Mi Persona Favorita"	Alejandro Sanz and Camila Cabello	Leonel García – "Bailar" (Leonel García); Paula Arenas, Luigi Castillo and Santiago Castillo – "Buena Para Nada" (Paula Arenas); Antón Álvarez Alfaro, El Guincho and Rosalía – "Pienso en tu Mirá" — (Rosalía); Fonseca – "Ven" (Fonseca)	
2020	Camilo, Jon Leone & Richi López	"Tutu"	Camilo featuring Pedro Capó	Raquel Sofía – "Amor en Cuarentena" (Raquel Sofía); Juanes, Mauricio Rengifo, Andrés Torres & Sebastián Yatra – "Bonita" (Juanes and Sebastian Yatra); Pablo Alborán – "Cuando estés Aquí" (Pablo Alborán); Elsa Carvajal, Grettel Garibaldi, Susana Isaza & Ximena Sariñana – "Una Vez Más" (Ximena Sariñana)	
2021	Édgar Barrera and Camilo	"Vida de Rico"	Camilo	David Julca, Jonathan Julca, Pablo López and Sebastián Yatra – "Adiós" (Sebastián Yatra); Javier Limón – "Ahí" (Nella); Rafa Arcaute, Ricky Martin, Mauricio Rengifo, Andrés Torres and Carlos Vives – "Canción Bonita" (Carlos Vives & Ricky Martin); Mon Laferte – "La Mujer" (Mon Laferte and Gloria Trevi)	
2022	Pablo María Rousselon, Manuel Lara, Manuel Lorente, Juan Riutort and Sebastián Yatra	"Tacones Rojos"	Sebastián Yatra	Camilo, Jorge Luis Chacín, Andrés Leal, Martín Velilla & Carlos Vives – "Baloncito Viejo" (Carlos Vives & Camilo); Julio Reyes Copello & Fonseca – "Besos en la Frente" (Fonseca); Édgar Barrera & Camilo – "Índigo" (Camilo & Evaluna Montaner)	
2022	Jorge Drexler	"La Guerrilla de la Concordia"	Jorge Drexler	Camilo, Jorge Luis Chacín, Andrés Leal, Martín Velilla & Carlos Vives – "Baloncito Viejo" (Carlos Vives & Camilo); Julio Reyes Copello & Fonseca – "Besos en la Frente" (Fonseca); Édgar Barrera & Camilo – "Índigo" (Camilo & Evaluna Montaner)	
2023	Santiago Alvarado, Bizarrap, Kevyn Mauricio Cruz Moreno and Shakira	"Shakira: Bzrp Music Sessions, Vol. 53"	Bizarrap featuring Shakira	Edgar Barrera & Camilo – "5:24" (Camilo); Natalia Hernández Morales, Monsieur Periné, Santiago Prieto Sarabia, Julio Reyes Copello & Mitchie Rivera – "Bailo Pa Ti" (Monsieur Periné); Pablo Alboran, Mauricio Rengifo, Andres Torres & Sebastian Yatra – "Contigo" (Sebastian Yatra featuring Pablo Alboran); Paula Arenas & Manuel Ramos – "Déjame Llorarte" (Paula Arenas & Jesús Navarro)	
2024	Manuel Lorente Freire, Héctor Mazzarri, Alberto Montenegro, Daniel Rondón & Andres Story	"Feriado"	Rawayana	Julio Reyes Copello & Mariana Vega – "A la Mitad" (Maura Nava); Paty Cantú, Ángela Dávalos, Leon Leiden & Saibu – "A las 3" (Paty Cantú & León Leiden); David Bisbal, Pablo Preciado & Carlos Rivera – "Ahora" (David Bisbal & Carlos Rivera); José Andrés Benitez, Christian Bermudez, Richard Bermudez, Rodney Kumbirayi Hwingwiri, Juan Diego Linares, Luis Alejandro Márquez, Anibal Morin Diaz, Danny Ocean & Rafael Salcedo – "Amor" (Danny Ocean); Lagos – "Dime Quién" (Lagos); Carter Lang, Manuel Lorente Freire, Kali Uchis & Dylan Wiggins – "Igual Que un Ángel" (Kali Uchis & Peso Pluma)	
2025	Rafa Arcaute, Gino Borri, Ca7riel & Paco Amoroso, Amanda Ibanez, Vicente Jiménez & Federico Vindver	"El Día del Amigo"	Ca7riel & Paco Amoroso	Andrés Cepeda, Mauricio Rengifo & Andrés Torres – "Bogotá" (Andrés Cepeda); Camilo, Gonzalo Ferreyra & Yami Safdie – "Querida Yo" (Yami Safdie & Camilo); Edgar Barrera, Bizarrap, Kevyn Mauricio Cruz Moreno & Shakira – "Soltera" (Shakira); Juan Ariza, Covi Quintana & Nicole Zignago – "Te Quiero" (Nicole Zignago)	
2026	Noah Goldstein, David Rodríguez, Rosalía, Ryan Tedder & Dylan Wiggins	"La Perla"	Rosalía & Yahritza y su Esencia	Rafa Arcaute, Nate Campany, Kany García, Richi López & Sara Schell – "A la Niña Que Fui" (Kany García); Joaquina – "Amarillo" (Joaquina); nic & Raquel Sofía – "(favorito)" (nic); Mon Laferte – "Melancolía" (Mon Laferte)	

== Most wins ==
2 Wins

- Camilo (consecutive)

== Most nominations ==
5 Nominations

- Camilo

4 Nominations

- Sebastián Yatra

3 Nominations

- Edgar Barrera

2 Nominations

- Carlos Vives
- Fonseca
- Pablo Alboran
- Rosalía

== See also ==
- Billboard Latin Music Award for Latin Pop Song of the Year
- Lo Nuestro Award for Best Pop Song of the Year
