= Edgar Barrera =

- Barrera in the press room of the 27th Annual Latin Grammy Awards, 2026

Background information
- Born: April 18, 1990 (age 36); McAllen, Texas, U.S.
- Origin: Roma, Texas
- Genres: Pop; Latin Pop; Reggaeton; Regional Mexican; Bachata; Vallenato
- Occupations: Songwriter, producer, recording engineer, musician
- Years active: 2011–present
- Website: edgarbarrera.com

Edgar Ivan Barrera (born April 18, 1990), also known by his professional name Edge, is an American songwriter, producer, and musician based in Miami, Florida. He has won a total of 31 Latin Grammy Awards (the most for any individual) and 1 Grammy Award including "Producer of The Year" in 2021, 2023, and 2024; and "Songwriter of The Year" in 2023, 2024, and 2025. As a songwriter he has won a total of 44 BMI Awards, making him one of the most awarded writers in Latin music. He has written and produced songs for artists such as Ariana Grande, Camila Cabello, Ed Sheeran, Madonna, Selena Gomez, Peso Pluma, Karol G, Bad Bunny, Grupo Frontera, Maluma, Christian Nodal, Manuel Turizo, Rels B, The Weeknd, Shakira, Camilo, Grupo Firme, Fuerza Regida, Carín León, Marc Anthony, and Natanael Cano.

At the 13th, 14th, 16th, 22nd, 24th, 25th, and 26th Latin Grammy Awards ceremonies, Barrera made headlines for being one of the musicians with the most nominations during these years, achieving the feat of being the most nominated musician overall in 2023 and 2024. Barrera received a nomination for the Grammy Award for Songwriter of the Year, Non-Classical at the 66th and 67th Annual Grammy Awards.

== Grammy Awards ==
Name of the award ceremony, year presented, recipient of the award, category and result
Award	Year	Recipient(s) and nominee(s)	Category	Result	Ref.
Grammy Awards	2015	Más Corazón Profundo	Best Tropical Album	Won	
Grammy Awards	2024	Himself	Songwriter of the Year, Non-Classical	Nominated	
Grammy Awards	2025	Himself	Songwriter of the Year, Non-Classical	Nominated	
Latin Grammy Awards	2012	Eso Es Lo Que Hay	Album of the Year	Nominated	
Latin Grammy Awards	2012	No Me Compares	Record of the Year	Nominated	
Latin Grammy Awards	2012	"Que Te Vaya Mal"	Record of the Year	Nominated	
Latin Grammy Awards	2012	"Calentura"	Record of the Year	Nominated	
Latin Grammy Awards	2013	Corazón Profundo	Album of the Year	Nominated	
Latin Grammy Awards	2013	La Música No Se Toca	Album of the Year	Nominated	
Latin Grammy Awards	2013	"Volví a Nacer"	Record of the Year	Nominated	
Latin Grammy Awards	2013	Corazón Profundo	Best Tropical Fusion Album	Won	
Latin Grammy Awards	2013	¡Fantástico!	Best Latin Children's Album	Won	
Latin Grammy Awards	2013	Kany Garcia	Best Engineered Album	Won	
Latin Grammy Awards	2014	Más + Corazón Profundo	Album of the Year	Nominated	
Latin Grammy Awards	2014	"El Mar de Sus Ojos"	Record of the Year	Nominated	
Latin Grammy Awards	2014	"Cuando nos volvamos a encontrar"	Record of the Year	Nominated	
Latin Grammy Awards	2014	"Darte un Beso"	Record of the Year	Nominated	
Latin Grammy Awards	2014	Más + Corazón Profundo	Best Contemporary Tropical Album	Won	
Latin Grammy Awards	2015	Todo Tiene Su Hora	Album of the Year	Won	
Latin Grammy Awards	2015	"Tus Besos"	Record of the Year	Nominated	
Latin Grammy Awards	2015	El Mismo	Best Tropical Fusion Album	Won	
Latin Grammy Awards	2015	"Cómo Duele El Silencio"	Best Tropical Song	Nominated	
Latin Grammy Awards	2015	"Todo Tuyo"	Best Regional Song	Won	
Latin Grammy Awards	2015	Todo Tiene Su Hora	Best Contemporary Tropical Album	Won	
Latin Grammy Awards	2015	Mi Vicio Más Grande	Best Banda Album	Won	
Latin Grammy Awards	2017	"Vale La Pena"	Best Regional Mexican Song	Nominated	
Latin Grammy Awards	2018	"Internacionales"	Record of the Year	Nominated	
Latin Grammy Awards	2018	F.A.M.E.	Best Contemporary Pop Vocal Album	Won	
Latin Grammy Awards	2018	"Vives"	Best Contemporary Tropical Album	Won	
Latin Grammy Awards	2019	Ahora	Best Ranchero/Mariachi Album	Won	
Latin Grammy Awards	2019	"No Te Contaron Mal"	Best Regional Song	Won	
Latin Grammy Awards	2019	"De Los Besos Que Te Di"	Best Regional Song	Nominated	
Latin Grammy Awards	2020	Por Primera Vez	Album of the Year	Nominated	
Latin Grammy Awards	2020	"ADMV"	Song of the Year	Nominated	
Latin Grammy Awards	2020	"El Mismo Aire"	Song of the Year	Nominated	
Latin Grammy Awards	2021	Himself	Producer of the Year	Won	
Latin Grammy Awards	2021	Mis Manos	Album of the Year	Nominated	
Latin Grammy Awards	2021	"Vida de Rico"	Record of the Year	Nominated	
Latin Grammy Awards	2021	"Vida de Rico"	Song of the Year	Nominated	
Latin Grammy Awards	2021	"Hawái"	Song of the Year	Nominated	
Latin Grammy Awards	2021	Mis Manos	Best Pop Vocal Album	Won	
Latin Grammy Awards	2021	"Vida de Rico"	Best Pop Song	Won	
Latin Grammy Awards	2021	"Aquí Abajo"	Best Regional Song	Won	
Latin Grammy Awards	2021	"Tuyo y Mío"	Best Regional Song	Nominated	
Latin Grammy Awards	2022	Himself	Producer of the Year	Nominated	
Latin Grammy Awards	2022	Aguilera	Album of the Year	Nominated	
Latin Grammy Awards	2022	Pa'llá Voy	Album of the Year	Nominated	
Latin Grammy Awards	2022	"Pegao"	Record of the Year	Nominated	
Latin Grammy Awards	2022	"Índigo"	Song of the Year	Nominated	
Latin Grammy Awards	2022	"Índigo"	Best Pop Song	Nominated	
Latin Grammy Awards	2022	Forajido	Best Ranchero/Mariachi Album	Won	
Latin Grammy Awards	2022	"Como Lo Hice Yo"	Best Regional Song	Won	
Latin Grammy Awards	2022	"Cada Quien"	Best Regional Song	Nominated	
Latin Grammy Awards	2022	"Vivo en el 6"	Best Regional Song	Nominated	
Latin Grammy Awards	2023	Himself	Producer of the Year	Won	
Latin Grammy Awards	2023	Himself	Songwriter of the Year	Won	
Latin Grammy Awards	2023	De Adentro Pa Afuera	Album of the Year	Nominated	
Latin Grammy Awards	2023	"La Fórmula"	Record of the Year	Nominated	
Latin Grammy Awards	2023	"NASA"	Song of the Year	Nominated	
Latin Grammy Awards	2023	"Un x100to"	Song of the Year	Nominated	
Latin Grammy Awards	2023	"5:24"	Best Pop Song	Nominated	
Latin Grammy Awards	2023	"Ambulancia"	Best Tropical Song	Nominated	
Latin Grammy Awards	2023	"El Merengue"	Best Tropical Song	Nominated	
Latin Grammy Awards	2023	"La Fórmula"	Best Tropical Song	Nominated	
Latin Grammy Awards	2023	"Alaska"	Best Regional Song	Nominated	
Latin Grammy Awards	2023	"La Siguiente"	Best Regional Song	Nominated	
Latin Grammy Awards	2023	"Un x100to"	Best Regional Song	Won	
Latin Grammy Awards	2024	Himself	Producer of the Year	Won	
Latin Grammy Awards	2024	Himself	Songwriter of the Year	Won	
Latin Grammy Awards	2024	Boca Chueca, Vol. 1	Album of the Year	Nominated	
Latin Grammy Awards	2024	"Mi Ex Tenía Razón"	Record of the Year	Nominated	
Latin Grammy Awards	2024	"Mi Ex Tenía Razón"	Song of the Year	Nominated	
Latin Grammy Awards	2024	"(Entre Paréntesis)"	Song of the Year	Nominated	
Latin Grammy Awards	2024	"Según Quién"	Song of the Year	Nominated	
Latin Grammy Awards	2024	"El Amor de Su Vida"	Best Regional Song	Won	
Latin Grammy Awards	2024	"Por el Contrario"	Best Regional Song	Nominated	
Latin Grammy Awards	2024	"El Comienzo"	Best Norteño Album	Won	
Latin Grammy Awards	2025	"Si Antes Te Hubiera Conocido"	Record of the Year	Nominated	
Latin Grammy Awards	2025	"Si Antes Te Hubiera Conocido"	Song of the Year	Won	
Latin Grammy Awards	2025	"Si Antes Te Hubiera Conocido"	Best Tropical Song	Won	
Latin Grammy Awards	2025	"Soltera"	Best Pop Song	Nominated	
Latin Grammy Awards	2025	"Cosas Pendientes"	Best Urban Song	Nominated	
Latin Grammy Awards	2025	"Hecha Pa' Mí"	Best Regional Mexican Song	Nominated	
Latin Grammy Awards	2025	"Me Jalo"	Best Regional Mexican Song	Nominated	
Latin Grammy Awards	2025	"Si Tú Me Vieras"	Best Regional Mexican Song	Nominated	
Latin Grammy Awards	2025	Himself	Songwriter of the Year	Won	
Latin Grammy Awards	2025	Himself	Producer of the Year	Nominated	

== Most Popular Songs ==
Artist	Song
Manuel Turizo	La Bachata
Maluma	Hawái
Grupo Frontera, Bad Bunny	Un X100to
Camila Cabello, Ed Sheeran	Bam Bam
Ariana Grande, Social House	Boyfriend
Grupo Frontera, Carin Leon	Que Vuelvas
Maluma, Carin Leon	Según Quién
Maluma	11 pm
Karol G	Si Antes Te Hubiera Conocido
Gera Mx, Christian Nodal	Botella Tras Botella
Marshmello, Manuel Turizo	El Merengue
Piso 21, Christian Nodal	Pa' Olvidarme De Ella
Maluma	Sobrio
Maluma	Hp
Grupo Frontera, Grupo Firme	El Amor De Su Vida
Fuerza Regida, Grupo Frontera	Bebe Dame
Karol G	Mi Ex Tenía Razón
Xxxtentacion, Lil Pump, Swae Lee, Maluma	Arms Around You
Camilo	Vida De Rico
Christian Nodal	Ya No Somos Ni Seremos
Camilo	Favorito
Selena Gomez, Rauw Alejandro	Baila Conmigo
Cnco, Yandel	Hey Dj
Christian Nodal	Aquí Abajo
Camilo, Christian Nodal	La Mitad
Sebastian Yatra, Mau Y Ricky	Ya No Tiene Novio
Peso Pluma, Grupo Frontera	Tulum
Camilo, El Alfa	Bebé
Pablo Alborán - Camilo, Pablo Alborán	El Mismo Aire
Shakira, Maluma	Clandestino

== Billboard Top Charts ==
Artist	Song	Top
Grupo Firme	Ya Superame	Regional Mex
Grupo Firme, Maluma	Cada Quien	Regional Mex
Banda Ms, Carin Leon	Ojos Cerrados	Regional Mex
Maluma	Sobrio	Latin Airplay
Camilo	Pegao	Tropical Airplay
Christian Nodal	Vivo En El 6	Regional Mex
Christian Nodal, Banda Ms	La Sinverguenza	Regional Mex
Camilo	Millones	Latin Pop Airplay
Natti Natasha	Noches En Miami	Latin Airplay
Maluma	Hawai	Latin Airplay
Maluma	Mala Mia	Latin Airplay
Maluma	El Prestamo	Latin Airplay
Maluma	Hp	Latin Airplay
Maluma	11pm	Latin Airplay
Maluma	Admv	Latin Airplay
Maluma, J Balvin	Que Pena	Latin Airplay
Maluma, Shakira	Clandestino	Latin Airplay
Maluma	Sin Contrato	Latin Airplay
Maluma, Jlo	Pa Ti	Latin Airplay
Maluma, Prince Royce	El Clavo	Latin Airplay
Christian Nodal	No Te Contaron Mal	Regional Airplay
Christian Nodal	De Los Besos Que Te Di	Regional Airplay
Christian Nodal	Nada Nuevo	Regional Airplay
Christian Nodal	Se Me Olvido	Reginoal Airplay
Christian Nodal, Angela Aguilar	Dime Comoquieres	Regional Airplay
Christian Nodal	Aquí Abajo	Regional Airplay
Christian Nodal, Plebes Del Rancho	2 Veces	Regional Airplay
Christian Nodal, Alejandro Fernandez	Duele	Regional Airplay
Jlo	El Anillo	Latin Airplay
Sebastian Yatra, Mau Y Ricky	Ya No Tiene Novio	Latin Airplay
Daddy Yankee, Marc Anthony	De Vuelta Pa La Vuelta	Latin Airplay
Selena Gomez, Rauw Alejandro	Baila Conmigo	Latin Airplay
Christian Daniel	Me Vuelvo Un Cobarde	Latin Airplay
Camilo	Vida De Rico	Latin Airplay
Camilo	Kesi	Tropical Airplay
Marc Anthony	Parecen Viernes	Tropical Airplay
Manuel Turizo	La Bachata	Latin Airplay
Maluma	Junio	Latin Airplay
Cnco	Hey Dj	Mexico Español Airplay
Camilo, Grupo Firme	Alaska	Regional Mexican Airplay
Christian Nodal, Gera Mx	Botella Tras Botella	Latin Digital Song Sales
Grupo Grontera, Carin Leon	Que Vuelvas	Regional Mexican Airplay
Grupo Frontera, Marca Registrada	Di Que Si	Regional Mexican Airplay
Bad Bunny, Grupo Frontera	Unx100to	Global 200, Latin Airplay
Christian Nodal	Cumbion Dolido	Reginoal Mexican Airplay
Yahritza Y Su Escencia, Grupo Frontera	Fragil	Reginoal Mexican Airplay
Karol G	Mi Ex Tenia Razon	Hot Latin Songs
Grupo Frontera, Grupo Firme	El Amor De Su Vida	Regional Mexican Airplay
Maluma	Coco Loco	Latin Rhythm Airplay
Manuel Turizo, Mashmello	El Merengue	Hot Latin Songs
Alejandro Fernandez	Dificil Tu Caso	Regional Mexican Airplay
Shakira, Fuerza Regida	El Jefe	Latin Airplay
Maluma, Carin Leon	Según Quien	Latin Airplay
Carin Leon, Grupo Frontera	Alch Si	Regional Mexican Airplay
Becky G, Angela Aguilar, Leonardo Aguilar	Por El Contrario	Latin Airplay
Prince Royce, Gabito Ballesteros	Cosas De La Peda	Latin Airplay
Grupo Frontera, Christian Nodal	Ya Pedo Quien Sabe	Regional Mexican Airplay
Shakira, Grupo Frontera	(Entre Paréntesis)	Latin Airplay
Karol G	Si Antes Te Hubiera Conocido	Hot Latin Song, Latin Airplay
Grupo Frontera, Maluma	Por Que Sera	Regional Airplay
Pepe Aguilar	Mira Quien Lo Dice	Regional Mexican Airplay
La Arrolladora Banda El Limon	Aquí Hay Para Llevar	Regional Mexican Airplay
Grupo Frontera	Hecha Pa Mi	Reginal Mexican Airplay
Shakira	Soltera	Latin Pop Airplay

== BMI Latin Awards ==
Year	Category	Song
2017	Best Regional Song	Vale La Pena
2020	Regional Mexican Song Of The Year	No Te Contaron Mal
2020	Most-Performed Songs Of The Year	Clandestino
2020	Most-Performed Songs Of The Year	El Prestamo
2020	Most-Performed Songs Of The Year	Mala Mia
2020	Most-Performed Songs Of The Year	Nada Nuevo
2021	Songwriter Of The Year	
2021	Regional Mexican Song Of The Year	De Los Besos Que Te Di
2021	Most-Performed Songs Of The Year	11:00 P. M.
2021	Most-Performed Songs Of The Year	Hp
2021	Most-Performed Songs Of The Year	Se Me Olvido
2022	Most-Performed Songs Of The Year	Aquí Abajo
2022	Most-Performed Songs Of The Year	Dime Como Quieres
2022	Most-Performed Songs Of The Year	Elegiste Un Error
2022	Most-Performed Songs Of The Year	Hawai
2023	Latin Impact Award	
2023	Regional Mexicansongwriter Of The Year	
2023	Most-Performed Songs Of The Year	2 Veces
2023	Most-Performed Songs Of The Year	Botella Tras Botella
2023	Most-Performed Songs Of The Year	Cada Quien
2023	Most-Performed Songs Of The Year	De Vuelta Pa´La Vuelta
2023	Most-Performed Songs Of The Year	La Sinverguenza
2023	Most-Performed Songs Of The Year	Ojos Cerrados
2023	Most-Performed Songs Of The Year	Ya Superame
2023	Most-Performed Songs Of The Year	Vida De Rico
2023	Most-Performed Songs Of The Year	Sobrio
2024	Regional Mexican Songwriter Of The Year	
2024	Most-Performed Songs Of The Year	Bebe Dame
2024	Most-Performed Songs Of The Year	Chanel
2024	Most-Performed Songs Of The Year	Di Que Si
2024	Most-Performed Songs Of The Year	La Bachata
2024	Most-Performed Songs Of The Year	Ya No Somos Ni Seremos
2024	Most-Performed Songs Of The Year	Un X100to
2024	Most-Performed Songs Of The Year	Que Vuelvas
