= Tutu (song) =

2019 single by Camilo and Pedro Capó

Single by Camilo and Pedro Capó

from the album 'Por Primera Vez'
- Language: Spanish
- English title: "You-you"
- Released: 9 August 2019
- Length: 2:58
- Label: Sony Latin; HAMM
- Songwriters: Camilo Echeverry; Jon Leone; Richi Lopez
- Producers: Jon Leone; Richi Lopez

Camilo singles chronology
"La Boca" (2019)	"Tutu" (2019)	"Primer Avión" (2019)

Pedro Capó singles chronology
"Como Lo Hiciste Ayer" (2019)	"Tutu" (2019)	"Quédate" (2019)

Music video
- "Tutu" on YouTube

"Tutu" (transl. "You-you") is a song by Colombian singer Camilo and Puerto Rican singer Pedro Capó. The song was written by Camilo and its producers, Jon Leone and Richi Lopez. It was released on 9 August 2019. Due to the song's success, a remix with fellow singer Shakira was released on 15 October 2019.

"Tutu" is a pop song based on urban beats. The lyrics were inspired by the love Camilo feels for his girlfriend, Evaluna Montaner, who is also the protagonist of the music video.

== Live performances ==
On November 24, 2019, Camilo and Pedro Capó joined Shakira to perform the remix version of the song at the closing ceremony of the 2019 Davis Cup in Madrid.

== Shakira remix ==
"Tutu (Remix)"

Single by Camilo, Shakira and Pedro Capó

from the album Por Primera Vez
- Released: 15 October 2019
- Recorded: October 2019
- Studio: Criteria Studios (Miami, FL)
- Genre: Latin pop
- Length: 2:44
- Label: Sony Latin; HAMM
- Songwriters: Camilo Echeverry; Jon Leone; Richi Lopez
- Producers: Jon Leone; Richi Lopez

Shakira singles chronology
"Nada" (2018)	"Tutu (Remix)" (2019)	"Me Gusta" (2020)

Audio video
- "Tutu" (Remix) on YouTube

=== Background and release ===
In October 2019, Shakira posted a video of herself singing along to “Tutu” on Instagram. She captioned the video saying “I can’t get this song out of my head!”. She privately messaged Echeverry, asking to record a remix of the song.

=== Critical reception ===
In Rolling Stone, Lucas Villa viewed the "Tutu" remix as an "airy, feminine touch, treating Echeverry’s lyrics with the utmost care."

== Charts ==
=== Weekly charts ===
Chart (2019)	Peak position
Argentina (Argentina Hot 100)	1
Bolivia (Monitor Latino)	4
Brazil (Top 100 Brasil)	91
Chile (Monitor Latino)	1
Colombia (Monitor Latino)	2
Colombia (National-Report)	4
Costa Rica (Monitor Latino)	3
Ecuador (Monitor Latino)	5
El Salvador (Monitor Latino)	2
Guatemala (Monitor Latino)	1
Italy (FIMI)	97
Mexico (Billboard Mexican Airplay)	1
Mexico (Monitor Latino)	2
Nicaragua (Monitor Latino)	14
Panama (Monitor Latino)	4
Paraguay (Monitor Latino)	1
Paraguay (SGP)	19
Peru (Monitor Latino)	3
Puerto Rico (Monitor Latino)	4
Spain (PROMUSICAE)	8
Spain (PROMUSICAE) Shakira remix	98
Uruguay (Monitor Latino)	1
US Hot Latin Songs (Billboard)	16
US Latin Airplay (Billboard)	10
US Latin Pop Airplay (Billboard)	2
Venezuela (Monitor Latino)	2

=== Year-end charts ===
Chart (2019)	Position
Argentina Airplay (Monitor Latino)	24
US Hot Latin Songs (Billboard)	96

Chart (2020)	Position
Argentina Airplay (Monitor Latino)	7

== Certifications ==
Region	Certification	Certified units/sales
Brazil (Pro-Música Brasil)	3× Platinum	120,000^{‡}
Mexico (AMPROFON)	2× Diamond+4× Platinum	840,000^{‡}
Portugal (AFP)	Gold	5,000^{‡}
Spain (Promusicae)	2× Platinum	80,000^{‡}
Spain (Promusicae) certification for "Tutu Remix"	Gold	30,000^{‡}
United States (RIAA)	Diamond (Latin)	600,000^{‡}
^{‡} Sales+streaming figures based on certification alone.

== See also ==
- List of Billboard Argentina Hot 100 number-one singles of 2019
- List of airplay number-one hits of the 2010s (Argentina)
