= The Cushman School =

Location
- 592 Northeast 60th Street; Miami, Florida 33137; United States; 25.831784°N 80.184795°W

Information
- Type: Private
- Motto: "An identity linked to excellence"
- Founded: 1924; 102 years ago
- Founder: Laura Cushman
- Elementary Principal: Cheryl Rogers
- Primary Principal: Jill Sevilla
- Headmistress: Arvi Balseiro
- Grades: Pre-K - 12
- Gender: Coeducational
- Enrollment: 850
- Colours: Blue and white
- Mascot: Cushman Cougar
- Team name: Cushman
- Tuition: $20,950 - $37,960
- Website: www.cushmanschool.org

The Cushman School is Miami-Dade's oldest, continuously- operating, co-ed private school located in Miami, Florida. Founded in 1924, the school currently serves an international student body of about 850 students from Pre-kindergarten through High School.

== History ==
The Cushman School was founded in 1924 by Dr. Laura Cushman who was known in the 20's for her innovative ideas and progressive approach to education. Her intention to create an ambitious yet joyful learning environment that addressing the whole student is still the school's focus nearly a century later. The school was named a Blue Ribbon School of Excellence in 1991–1992, and is accredited by the Florida Council of Independent Schools (FCIS), the Southern Association of Colleges and Schools, and the Southern Association of Independent Schools, Cognia, and is a member of the National Association of Independent Schools.

The main campus consists of a mix of historic and new buildings and is located in a historic section of northeast Miami. The high school building is a few blocks south on Biscayne Boulevard. Since its opening in 1924, the school has introduced approaches to education that include an educational psychology calling for broad student input in the learning process.

Dr. Arvi Balseiro is the third Head of School in the school's 102-year history. She succeeded Dr. Joan Lutton, who was the Head of School for 32 years following the founder, Dr. Laura Cushman, who was Head for 57 years.

== Academics ==
=== General Information ===
The school's enrollment is approximately 850 students throughout grades Pre-K through twelfth with the average class sizes ranging from 8-15 students. Tuition ranges from $26,238 in Pre-K through $39,670 in grades 9–12. Tuition for the Laura Cushman Academy includes $47,300 for grades Pre-K through fifth grade, $37,750 for grades sixth through eighth, and $46,312 for grades ninth through tenth.

=== Programming ===
The School's programming includes a unique, 4-year Society & Me (SAM) Challenge Seminar in the High School, Pre-Law, Biomedical, Design Art & Technology (DAT), Performing Arts, Public Speaking/Oratory Challenges, Comprehensive Athletics, AP Classes, Dual Enrollment, and multiple Internship Opportunities. The Cushman School also offers online programming for sixth through twelfth grade students through its newest Cushman Virtual division.

The school also offers students multiple after school clubs including STEM robotics, painting, ballet, club soccer, karate, basketball, and foreign languages.

=== Global Collaborations ===
The Cushman School offers many international and domestic trips and student collaborations aimed at immersing students in a global perspective. Cushman has exchange programs with schools in China, Spain, and Mexico. Some trips have included travel to Peru, Iceland and many destination in Western Europe and the United States.

== Athletics ==
The Cushman School offers a variety of competitive sports throughout multiple seasons. These include:

Fall Sports	Winter Sports	Spring Sports
Cross Country	Basketball	Tennis
Swimming	soccer	Track and Field
Girls Volleyball		Girls Beach Volleyball
Flag Football		
Golf		
HS Bowling		

== Notable alumni ==
- Evaluna Montaner, singer and actress
- Nick Castellanos, professional baseball player for the MLB
- Esteban Cortázar, fashion designer
- Joey Bosa, Professional football linebacker for the NFL
- Emily Estefan, singer
