= Pedro Capó (album) =

Studio album by Pedro Capó
- Released: September 19, 2011
- Recorded: 2009–2011
- Genre: Latin pop
- Length: 45:23
- Label: Sony Music Latin

Pedro Capó chronology
| Fuego y Amor (2007) | Pedro Capó (2011) | Aquila (2014) |

Singles from Pedro Capó
- 1. "Valió la Pena" Released: January 1, 2009; 2. "Vamos a Huir" Released: August 27, 2009; 3. "Un Poquito Más" Released: November 16, 2009; 4. "Un Minuto" Released: September 19, 2011; 5. "Si Tú Me Lo Pides" Released: September 20, 2011; 6. "La Vida Va" Released: September 21, 2012; 7. "Duele Ser Infiel" Released: January 21, 2013

Pedro Capó is the second studio album by Puerto Rican singer Pedro Capó, released by Sony Music Latin on September 19, 2011.

== Credits and personnel ==
Credits adapted from AllMusic.

- Claudia Brant – Composer
- Joseph Brennan – Composer
- Pedro Capó – Composer, Coros, Primary Artist
- Samuel Rosa De Alvarenga – Composer
- Isabel de Jesús – A&R
- Rafael Esparza-Ruiz – Composer
- Jaime Flores – Composer
- Kany García – Composer, Featured Artist
- Leonel García – Composer
- Gilberto Gil – Composer
- Katrina Lenk – Viola
- Luigie Gonzalez – Mezcla
- Dennis Morehouse – Bateria
- Raúl Ornelas – Composer
- Eduardo Osorio – Composer
- Mark Portman – Composer
- José Fernando Gómez Do Reis – Composer
- Carlos Salazar – Guitarron, Vihuela
- Amanda Zidow – Cello

== Track listing ==
| No. | Title | Writer(s) | Length |
|---|---|---|---|
| 1. | "Qué Más" | Pedro Capó; Samuel Rosa De Alvarenga; José Fernando Gómez Do Reis | 3:59 |
| 2. | "Vamos a Huir" | Pedro Capó; Gilberto Gil | 3:53 |
| 3. | "Un Minuto" | Pedro Capó; Rafael Esparza-Ruiz | 4:00 |
| 4. | "Un Poquito Más" | Pedro Capó; Rafael Esparza-Ruiz | 3:20 |
| 5. | "Si Tú Me Lo Pides" (featuring Kany Gracía) | Pedro Capó; Rafael Esparza-Ruiz; Kany García; Eduardo Osorio | 4:12 |
| 6. | "Duele Ser Infiel" | Pedro Capó; Leonel Gracía | 4:16 |
| 7. | "La Vída Va" | Claudia Brant; Pedro Capó; Mark Portman | 4:13 |
| 8. | "Mátame" | Joseph Brennan; Pedro Capó; Rafael Esparza-Ruiz | 2:59 |
| 9. | "Que No" | Pedro Capó; Rafael Esparza-Ruiz | 3:04 |
| 10. | "Valió la Pena" | Jaime Flores; Raúl Ornelas | 3:46 |
| 11. | "Sólo Quiero Quererte" | Pedro Capó; Rafael Esparza-Ruiz | 3:46 |
| 12. | "De Mal" | De Mal | 3:55 |

== Charts ==
| Chart (2012) | Peak position |
|---|---|
| US Top Latin Albums (Billboard) | 58 |
| US Latin Pop Albums (Billboard) | 18 |
