= Andrés Saavedra =

Colombian record producer (born 1985)

Andres Saavedra
- Born: Andrés Julián Saavedra; 23 March 1985 (age 41)
- Origin: Bogotá, Colombia
- Genres: Indie, pop, electronic, pop rock, alternative
- Occupations: Record producer, songwriter, mixer, engineer
- Years active: 2004–present
- Labels: Radioactive, Universal, Sony, Warner
- Website: andressaavedra.com

Andrés Julián Saavedra (born 23 March 1985) is a Colombian producer, songwriter, mixer and engineer. Andres has been nominated eight times to the Latin Grammy Awards, with his latest for Producer of the Year in the 16th Annual Latin Grammy Awards held November 2015. Andrés is one of the top Colombian producers defining the new sound in Latin music.

== Early life ==
Saavedra was born in Bogotá and raised in Cali. He began his approach to music, singing and musical instruments at a very early age. He wrote his first song at the age of 13. During his teenage years, Andres played with local bands "Años Luz" and "Estrato Cero" playing in bars and festivals in Cali. At the age of 17 he moved with his family to Miami, Florida to become a professional singer-songwriter.

During his college years, Saavedra played bass and drums in a student band called "Rocking Johnny and the Furious Five" and later became the singer of a duo called "Retorica". Playing in these bands helped him realize his true passion was in creative production, composing and record studios rather than stage performance. Saavedra's formal education comes from Full Sail University in Music Production and Recording Arts as well as additional courses in Berklee College of Music.

== Career ==
Andres' first professional experience was with Bogart Recording Studios, owned by American record producer-mixer Bob Rosa. He served as assistant to albums for artists such as Dashboard Confessional, Brian McKnight, as well as produced local indie bands and artists during studio after hours .

In 2004, Saavedra officially began his professional career as record producer and composer for a local independent record label and later in 2006 as a disciple to Latin music producers Sebastian Krys, Tommy Torres and Dan Warner acquiring the experience to shape his own musical style.

Andres has worked in many musical projects most notably for artists such as Luis Fonsi, Alejandro Sanz, Juanes, Avionica, Dulce Maria, Tommy Torres and Pablo Lopez. He has won two Latin Grammy Awards and one Grammy Award.

Saavedra is founder and CEO of RadioActive Music and is currently producer governor at The Recording Academy Florida Chapter.

== Grammy Awards ==
| Year | Nominee / work | Award | Result |
|---|---|---|---|
| 2015 | Himself | Producer of the Year | Nominated |
| 2013 | "Papito Deluxe" Miguel Bosé | Album of the Year | Nominated |
| 2012 | "Calentura" ChocQuibTown | Record of the Year | Nominated |
| 2012 | "Eso es lo que hay" ChocQuibTown | Album of the Year | Nominated |
| 2011 | "Sesiones Intimas" Amaury Gutierrez | Best Singer-Songwriter Album | Won |
| 2011 | "Paraíso Express" Alejandro Sanz | Best Latin Pop Vocal Album | Won |
| 2010 | "Paraíso Express" Alejandro Sanz | Best Male Pop Vocal Album | Won |
| 2009 | "Aquí estoy yo" Luis Fonsi | Record of the Year | Nominated |
| 2006 | "Cautivo" Chayanne | Album of the Year | Nominated |

Participation in other Latin Grammy nominated works

- "Best Contemporary Pop Vocal Album: "Rosario" – Rosario (2014)" – Producer, songwriter, Mixer, engineer, Musician See also: Latin Grammy Awards of 2014
- "Best Pop/Rock Album: "La conexión" – Black Guayaba (2013)" – Producer, Arranger, Mixer
- "Song of the Year: "Estoy hecho de pedacitos de ti" – Antonio Orozco (2012)" – Producer See also: Latin Grammy Awards of 2012
- "Best Engineered Album: "Días nuevos" – Gian Marco (2011)" See also: Latin Grammy Awards of 2011
