= Camilo (singer) =

Colombian singer (born 1994)

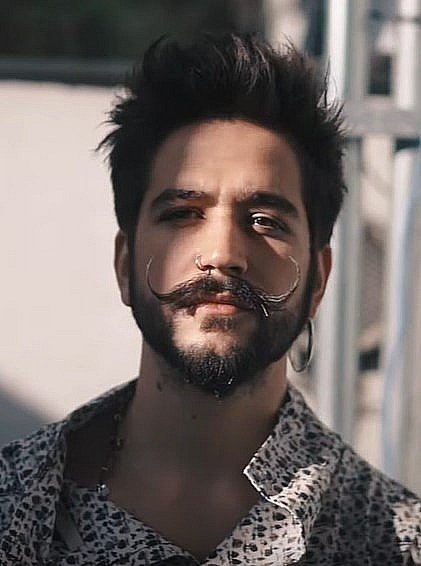
- Camilo in 2019
- Born: Camilo Echeverri Correa; 16 March 1994 (age 32); Medellín, Antioquia, Colombia
- Occupations: Singer; musician; songwriter
- Years active: 2019–present
- Spouse: Evaluna Montaner (m. 2020)
- Children: 2
- Musical career
- Genre: Latin pop
- Instruments: Vocals; guitar; piano
- Labels: Sony Latin; Hecho a Mano
- Website: camilolatribu.com

Camilo Echeverri Correa (born 16 March 1994), known mononymously as Camilo, is a Colombian singer, musician and songwriter. Born in Medellín, Antioquia, his accolades include six Latin Grammy Awards and three Grammy Award nominations.

He is known for his singles "Vida de Rico", "Una Vida Pasada" with Carin Leon, "Tutu" alongside Pedro Capó and Shakira, and collaborations like "Tattoo Remix" with Rauw Alejandro, "CONTIGO VOY A MUERTE" with Karol G and "Desconocidos" with Mau y Ricky and Manuel Turizo. His music is generally categorized as Latin pop with a mix of urbano music and is noted for his romantic lyrics and treble voice.

He debuted in 2008, after winning the talent show Factor XS in 2007. He is also known for writing and producing hits for other artists including Becky G and Natti Natasha's "Sin Pijama" and Anitta's "Veneno".

== Life and career ==
=== 1994–2018 Early life and career beginnings ===
Camilo Echeverry was born in Medellín, Antioquia in 1994. His family home did not have a radio, but housed a collection of records by artists such as The Beatles, Shakira, Charly Garcia, Facundo Cabral, Mercedes Sosa, and Pink Floyd. He recalled, "That was my first seed, since I was little, my dream was to inherit that." He formed a musical duo with his sister, Manuela, and auditioned for XS Factor with her, but the pair did not reach the final round of the competition. After winning the show as a solo artist the following year in 2007, Camilo began his career with the release of the single, "Regálame Tu Corazón".

In 2008, Camilo made appearances on Colombian telenovelas Super Pá and En los tacones de Eva, as well as the children's program Bichos. He released the 2010 mixtape Tráfico de Sentimientos and shortly after its release, Camilo decided to take a break from releasing his own music. In 2015, he moved to Miami, Florida, where he then furthered his career by writing songs for other artists, including "Sin Pijama" by Becky G and Natti Natasha, "Veneno" by Anitta, and "Ya No Tiene Novio" by Sebastian Yatra with Mau y Ricky. "Ya No Tiene Novio", released in August 2018, garnered over 517 million views on YouTube by March of the next year.

=== 2018–present: Success as a solo artist ===
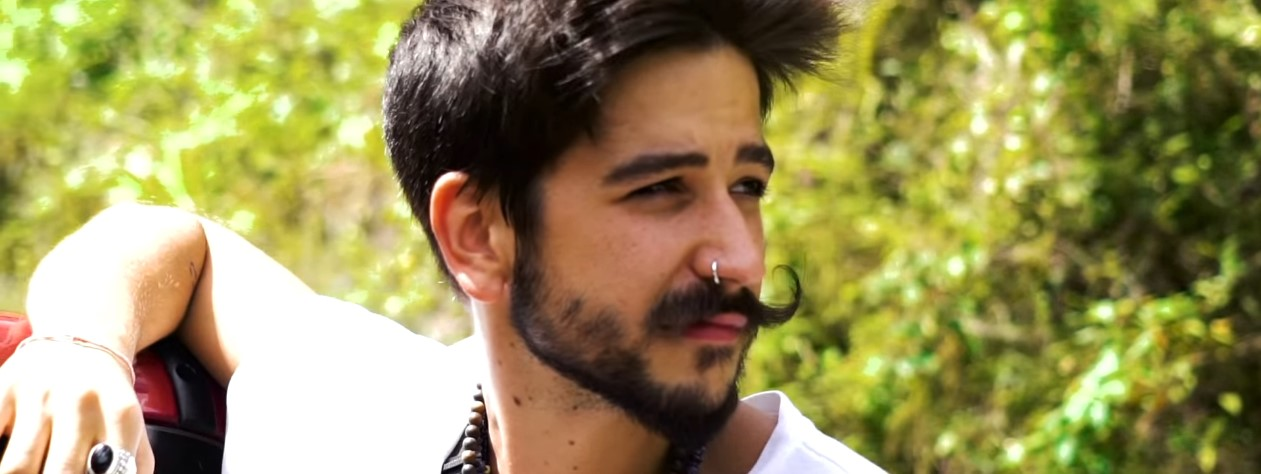
Camilo in 2018

Upon re-launching his solo career, Camilo made changes to his image. He eschewed his previously clean-cut style in favour of a more bohemian look, complete with a handlebar moustache. In 2018, he released the song "Desconocidos" with Manuel Turizo and Mau & Ricky. The ukulele-tinged reggaeton song peaked at number 23 on the Billboard Latin Pop Airplay chart. Following the success of "Desconocidos", Camilo revealed in February 2019 that he had signed with Sony Music Latin. On 22 February 2019, Camilo performed at the Venezuela Live Aid concert in Cúcuta, Colombia, a town located on the border with Venezuela. He reflected on the experience by explaining "It was a concert that moved me a lot. It was not easy, but so many people are suffering. I felt happy to be a part of raising global awareness to show what is happening in Venezuela is a tremendous injustice."

He released the video and single for "No Te Vayas" as his mainstream debut on 28 March 2019, and by August of that year, the video had reached more than 59 million views on YouTube. His 2019 song "La Boca" with Mau & Ricky was certified triple-platinum. After the release of the song, he made his US television debut, performing "La Boca" and "No Te Vayas" at the 2019 Premios Juventud in Miami. He released the song "Tutu" in collaboration with Puerto Rican singer Pedro Capó, which reached the number two position on the Latin Pop Airplay chart. Describing the lyrical content of the song, Camilo explained, “This song is who I am, what I feel every time I get on a stage or when I see my girlfriend.” Camilo released his first studio album Por Primera Vez on 17 April 2020, which debuted at number one on the Billboard Latin Pop Albums chart and number five on the Top Latin Albums chart. The album contains the singles "Tutu" and "Favorito" alongside breakout songs like "La Mitad" with Christian Nodal and "El Mismo Aire" which was later re-released with Pablo Alborán.

At the 21st Annual Latin Grammy Awards, Camilo received six nominations, winning the award for Best Pop Song for "Tutu".

In March 2021, he released his album Mis Manos which included some collaborations with artists such as Evaluna Montaner, Mau y Ricky, El Alfa, and Los Dos Carnales. His album was a candidate for Album Of The Year and Best Pop Vocal Album at the Latin Grammy Awards.

In September 2022 Camilo released De Adentro Pa Afuera an album which featured collaborations with Myke Towers, Alejandro Sanz, and others, followed in May 2024 by cuatro, a contemporary tropical album heavily influenced by genres Camilo heard while growing up including Pambiche, Cumbia, and Salsa music.

Since re-launching his solo career, Camilo has collaborated with global pop artists like Shawn Mendes in "KESI Remix", Selena Gomez in "999", Camila Cabello in "Ambulancia", and Diljit Dosanjh in "Palpita".

== Musical style ==
Camilo's music is generally characterized as Latin pop and reggaeton. Suzette Fernandez of Billboard labeled his music as "romantic pop songs fused with urban beats". His vocals have been described as "distinctly delicate". He cites Uruguayan singer Jorge Drexler as a major influence on his work.

== Personal life ==
In February 2020, he married Evaluna Montaner, a singer, after five years of dating. She is the daughter of the Argentine-Venezuelan singer and songwriter Ricardo Montaner and sister of the Venezuelan duo Mau y Ricky. They have two daughters, named Índigo and Amaranto.

== Discography ==
- Por Primera Vez (2020)
- Mis Manos (2021)
- De Adentro Pa Afuera (2022)
- cuatro (2024)
- Para Cuando Sean Mayores (2026)

== Filmography ==
Year	Title	Role	Notes
2007-08	Factor XS (Colombia)	Participant	Winner, first place
2021	La Voz Kids	Coach	

== Awards and nominations ==
Awards	Year	Nomination	Category	Result	Ref.
ASCAP Latin Music Awards	2021	"Si Me Dices Que Si" (with Reik y Farruko)	Winning Songs	Won	
ASCAP Latin Music Awards	2021	"Tattoo (Remix)" (with Rauw Alejandro)	Winning Songs	Won	
ASCAP Latin Music Awards	2021	"Tutu (Remix)" (with Pedro Capó y Shakira)	Winning Songs	Won	
ASCAP Latin Music Awards	2022	Himself	Artist of the Year	Won	
ASCAP Latin Music Awards	2022	"Bebé" (with El Alfa)	Winning Songs	Won	
ASCAP Latin Music Awards	2022	"Despeinada" (with Ozuna)	Winning Songs	Won	
ASCAP Latin Music Awards	2022	"Millones"	Winning Songs	Won	
ASCAP Latin Music Awards	2022	"Vida de Rico"	Winning Songs	Won	
ASCAP Latin Music Awards	2023	"Indigo" (with Evaluna Montaner)	Winning Songs	Won	
Billboard Latin Music Awards	2021	Himself	New Artist of the Year	Nominated	
Billboard Latin Music Awards	2021	Himself	Latin Pop Artist of the Year	Nominated	
Billboard Latin Music Awards	2021	"Si Me Dices Que Si" (with Reik y Farruko)	Latin Pop Song of the Year	Nominated	
Billboard Latin Music Awards	2021	Por Primera Vez	Latin Pop Album of the Year	Nominated	
Billboard Latin Music Awards	2021	Mis Manos	Latin Pop Album of the Year	Nominated	
Billboard Latin Music Awards	2022	Himself	Latin Pop Artist of the Year	Nominated	
Billboard Latin Music Awards	2023	De Adentro Pa Afuera	Latin Pop Album of the Year	Won	
Billboard Latin Music Awards	2024	Cuatro	Tropical Album of the Year	Won	
BMI Latin Awards	2023	"Despeinada" (with Ozuna)	Winning Songs	Won	
BMI Latin Awards	2023	"Vida de Rico"	Winning Songs	Won	
Grammy Awards	2021	Por Primera Vez	Best Latin Pop or Urban Album	Nominated	
Grammy Awards	2022	Mis Manos	Best Latin Pop Album	Nominated	
Grammy Awards	2023	De Adentro Pa Afuera	Best Latin Pop Album	Nominated	
Heat Latin Music Awards	2020	Himself	Best Pop Artist	Won	
Heat Latin Music Awards	2020	Himself	Best Artist Andean	Nominated	
Heat Latin Music Awards	2020	"Tutu" (with Pedro Capó)	Best Collaboration	Nominated	
Heat Latin Music Awards	2021	Himself	Best Male Artist	Nominated	
Heat Latin Music Awards	2021	Himself	Best Pop Artist	Won	
Heat Latin Music Awards	2021	"Machu Picchu" (with Evaluna Montaner)	Best Video	Nominated	
Heat Latin Music Awards	2021	"Bebé" (with El Alfa)	Best Collaboration	Nominated	
Heat Latin Music Awards	2022	Himself	Best Pop Artist	Nominated	
Heat Latin Music Awards	2022	"Buenos Días" (with Wisin y Los Legendarios)	Best Collaboration	Nominated	
Heat Latin Music Awards	2023	Himself	Best Pop Artist	Nominated	
Heat Latin Music Awards	2023	"Ambulancia" (with Camila Cabello)	Best Video	Nominated	
iHeartRadio Music Awards	2022	Himself	Latin Pop/Reggaeton Artist of the Year	Nominated	
Latin American Music Awards	2019	"En Guerra" (with Sebastián Yatra)	Favorite Video	Nominated	
Latin American Music Awards	2021	Himself	New Artist of the Year	Nominated	
Latin American Music Awards	2021	Himself	Favorite Pop Artist	Nominated	
Latin American Music Awards	2021	Por Primera Vez	Favorite Pop Album	Nominated	
Latin American Music Awards	2021	"Favorito"	Favorite Pop Song	Nominated	
Latin American Music Awards	2021	"Si Me Dices Que Si" (with Reik y Farruko)	Favorite Pop Song	Nominated	
Latin American Music Awards	2021	"Si Me Dices Que Si" (with Reik y Farruko)	Collaboration of the Year	Nominated	
Latin American Music Awards	2022	Himself	Artist of the Year	Nominated	
Latin American Music Awards	2022	Himself	Favorite Pop Artist	Nominated	
Latin American Music Awards	2022	Himself	Social Artist of the Year	Nominated	
Latin American Music Awards	2022	Mis Manos	Favorite Pop Album	Nominated	
Latin American Music Awards	2022	"Kesi"	Favorite Tropical Song	Nominated	
Latin American Music Awards	2022	"Indigo" (with Evaluna Montaner)	Favorite Video	Nominated	
Latin American Music Awards	2023	Himself	Favorite Pop Artist	Nominated	
Latin American Music Awards	2023	De Adentro Pa Afuera	Favorite Pop Album	Nominated	
Latin American Music Awards	2023	"Pegao"	Favorite Tropical Song	Nominated	
Latin American Music Awards	2023	"Buenos Días" (with Wisin y Los Legendarios)	Best Collaboration – Pop/Urban	Nominated	
Latin American Music Awards	2023	"Baloncito Viejo" (with Carlos Vives)	Best Collaboration – Tropical	Nominated	
Latin American Music Awards	2024	"Ambulancia" (with Camila Cabello)	Best Collaboration – Tropical	Nominated	
Latin Grammy Awards	2020	"Tutu" (with Pedro Capó)	Record of the Year	Nominated	
Latin Grammy Awards	2020	"Tutu" (with Pedro Capó)	Song of the Year	Nominated	
Latin Grammy Awards	2020	"El Mismo Aire"	Song of the Year	Nominated	
Latin Grammy Awards	2020	Por Primera Vez	Album of the Year	Nominated	
Latin Grammy Awards	2020	Por Primera Vez	Best Pop Vocal Album	Nominated	
Latin Grammy Awards	2020	"Tutu" (with Pedro Capó)	Best Pop Song	Won	
Latin Grammy Awards	2021	"Vida de Rico"	Record of the Year	Nominated	
Latin Grammy Awards	2021	"Amén" (with Ricardo Montaner, Evaluna Montaner y Mau y Ricky)	Record of the Year	Nominated	
Latin Grammy Awards	2021	"Vida de Rico"	Song of the Year	Nominated	
Latin Grammy Awards	2021	Mis Manos	Album of the Year	Nominated	
Latin Grammy Awards	2021	Mis Manos	Best Pop Vocal Album	Won	
Latin Grammy Awards	2021	"Vida de Rico"	Best Pop Song	Won	
Latin Grammy Awards	2021	"Tattoo (Remix)" (with Rauw Alejandro)	Best Urban Fusion/Performance	Won	
Latin Grammy Awards	2021	"Tuyo y Mío" (with Los Dos Carnales)	Best Regional Mexican Song	Nominated	
Latin Grammy Awards	2022	"Pegao"	Record of the Year	Nominated	
Latin Grammy Awards	2022	"Baloncito Viejo" (with Carlos Vives)	Record of the Year	Nominated	
Latin Grammy Awards	2022	"Baloncito Viejo" (with Carlos Vives)	Song of the Year	Nominated	
Latin Grammy Awards	2022	"Indigo" (with Evaluna Montaner)	Song of the Year	Nominated	
Latin Grammy Awards	2022	"Indigo" (with Evaluna Montaner)	Best Pop Song	Nominated	
Latin Grammy Awards	2022	"Baloncito Viejo" (with Carlos Vives)	Best Pop Song	Nominated	
Latin Grammy Awards	2023	De Adentro Pa Afuera	Album of the Year	Nominated	
Latin Grammy Awards	2023	De Adentro Pa Afuera	Best Pop Vocal Album	Nominated	
Latin Grammy Awards	2023	"NASA" (with Alejandro Sanz)	Song of the Year	Nominated	
Latin Grammy Awards	2023	"5:24"	Best Pop Song	Nominated	
Latin Grammy Awards	2023	"Ambulancia" (with Camila Cabello)	Best Tropical Song	Nominated	
Latin Grammy Awards	2023	"Alaska" (with Grupo Firme)	Best Regional Mexican Song	Nominated	
Latin Grammy Awards	2023	Camilo: El Primer Tour de Mi Vida	Best Long Form Music Video	Won	
Latin Grammy Awards	2024	"Una Vida Pasada" (with Carín León)	Record of the Year	Nominated	
Latin Grammy Awards	2024	cuatro	Album of the Year	Nominated	
Latin Grammy Awards	2024	cuatro	Best Contemporary Tropical Album	Nominated	
Latin Grammy Awards	2025	"Querida Yo" (with Yami Safdie)	Best Pop Song	Nominated	
LOS40 Music Awards	2020	Himself	Best New Act	Won	
LOS40 Music Awards	2020	"Favorito"	Best Song	Nominated	
LOS40 Music Awards	2020	"Tattoo (Remix)" (with Rauw Alejandro)	Best Song	Nominated	
LOS40 Music Awards	2021	Himself	Best Act	Nominated	
LOS40 Music Awards	2021	"Vida de Rico"	Best Song	Nominated	
LOS40 Music Awards	2022	Himself	Best Live Act	Nominated	
LOS40 Music Awards	2022	De Adentro Pa Afuera Tour	Best Tour, Festival or Concert	Won	
LOS40 Music Awards	2023	Himself	Best Act	Won	
LOS40 Music Awards	2023	Himself	Best Live Act	Nominated	
LOS40 Music Awards	2023	"Ni Me Debes Ni Te Debo" (with Carín León)	Best Collaboration	Nominated	
MTV Europe Music Awards	2020	Himself	Best Latin America Central Act	Nominated	
MTV Europe Music Awards	2021	Himself	Best Latin America Central Act	Nominated	
MTV Europe Music Awards	2022	Himself	Best Latin America Central Act	Nominated	
MTV Millennial Awards	2019	"Desconocidos" (with Manuel Turizo y Mau y Ricky)	Music-Ship of the Year	Nominated	
MTV Millennial Awards	2021	Himself	Colombian Artist	Nominated	
MTV Millennial Awards	2021	Himself and Evaluna Montaner	Hottest Couple	Nominated	
MTV Millennial Awards	2022	La Tribu	Fandom	Nominated	
Kids' Choice Awards	2020	La Tribu	Favorite Fandom (Latin America)	Nominated	
Kids' Choice Awards	2021	La Tribu	Favorite Fandom (Latin America)	Nominated	
Kids' Choice Awards	2022	Himself	Favorite Global Music Star	Nominated	
Kids' Choice Awards	2022	Himself	Favorite Artist (Latin America)	Won	
Kids' Choice Awards	2023	Himself	Favorite Artist (Latin America)	Nominated	
Kids' Mexico Choice Awards	2019	Himself	Favorite Music YouTuber	Nominated	
Kids' Mexico Choice Awards	2020	Himself	Favorite Latin Artist or Group	Nominated	
Kids' Mexico Choice Awards	2020	"Favorito"	Favorite Latin Hit	Nominated	
Kids' Mexico Choice Awards	2020	"Tattoo (Remix)" (with Rauw Alejandro)	Favorite Latin Hit	Nominated	
Kids' Mexico Choice Awards	2020	Himself and Evaluna Montaner	Favorite Ship	Won	
Kids' Mexico Choice Awards	2021	Himself	Favorite Latin Artist	Nominated	
Kids' Mexico Choice Awards	2021	"Ropa Cara"	Catchier Song	Nominated	
Kids' Mexico Choice Awards	2022	Himself	Favorite Latin Artist	Nominated	
Kids' Mexico Choice Awards	2023	Himself	Colombian Celebrity	Nominated	
Kids' Mexico Choice Awards	2023	"Ambulancia" (with Camila Cabello)	Favorite Collaboration	Won	
Premios Juventud	2019	Himself	Best New Urban Artist	Nominated	
Premios Juventud	2019	"Desconocidos" (with Manuel Turizo y Mau y Ricky)	Best Song: Singing in the Shower	Nominated	
Premios Juventud	2019	"Desconocidos" (with Manuel Turizo y Mau y Ricky)	This Is a BTS (Best Behind the Scenes)	Nominated	
Premios Juventud	2020	Himself	Hair Obsessed	Nominated	
Premios Juventud	2020	"Color esperanza (2020)"	The Quarentune	Nominated	
Premios Juventud	2021	Himself	Male Youth Artist of the Year	Nominated	
Premios Juventud	2021	Mis Manos	Album of the Year	Nominated	
Premios Juventud	2021	"Tuyo y Mío" (with Los Dos Carnales)	Best Regional Mexican Fusion	Nominated	
Premios Juventud	2021	"Bebé" (with El Alfa)	Tropical Mix	Nominated	
Premios Juventud	2021	"Titanic" (with Kany García)	La Mezcla Perfecta	Nominated	
Premios Juventud	2021	"Vida de Rico"	Viral Track of the Year	Nominated	
Premios Juventud	2022	Himself	Male Youth Artist of the Year	Nominated	
Premios Juventud	2022	Himself	My Favorite Streaming Artist	Nominated	
Premios Juventud	2022	Mis Manos	Album of the Year	Nominated	
Premios Juventud	2022	"Indigo" (with Evaluna Montaner)	Best Song by a Couple	Won	
Premios Juventud	2022	"Indigo" (with Evaluna Montaner)	Viral Track of the Year	Nominated	
Premios Juventud	2022	"Kesi (Remix)" (with Shawn Mendes)	Collaboration OMG	Nominated	
Premios Juventud	2022	La Tribu	Best Fandom	Nominated	
Premios Juventud	2023	Himself	Male Youth Artist of the Year	Nominated	
Premios Juventud	2023	Himself and Evaluna Montaner	Couples That Blow Up My Social	Nominated	
Premios Juventud	2023	"5:24"	Video with the Most Powerful Message	Nominated	
Premios Juventud	2023	"Ambulancia" (with Camila Cabello)	Best Pop Track	Nominated	
Premios Juventud	2023	De Adentro Pa Afuera	Best Pop Album	Nominated	
Premios Juventud	2023	"Alaska" (with Grupo Firme)	Best Regional Mexican Fusion	Nominated	
Premios Juventud	2023	"Pegao"	Best Tropical Hit	Nominated	
Premios Juventud	2023	La Tribu	Best Fandom	Nominated	
Premios Lo Nuestro	2020	Himself	Pop/Rock Artist of the Year	Nominated	
Premios Lo Nuestro	2020	"En Guerra" (with Sebastián Yatra)	Video of the Year	Nominated	
Premios Lo Nuestro	2020	"No Te Vayas"	Pop/Rock Song of the Year	Nominated	
Premios Lo Nuestro	2021	Himself	Artist of the Year	Nominated	
Premios Lo Nuestro	2021	Himself	New Artist – Male	Won	
Premios Lo Nuestro	2021	Himself	Pop Artist of the Year	Won	
Premios Lo Nuestro	2021	"Tattoo (Remix)" (with Rauw Alejandro)	Remix of the Year	Nominated	
Premios Lo Nuestro	2021	Por Primera Vez	Pop Album of the Year	Won	
Premios Lo Nuestro	2021	"Favorito"	Song of the Year	Nominated	
Premios Lo Nuestro	2021	"Favorito"	Pop Song of the Year	Nominated	
Premios Lo Nuestro	2021	"Si Me Dices Que Si" (with Reik y Farruko)	Pop Song of the Year	Nominated	
Premios Lo Nuestro	2021	"Si Me Dices Que Si" (with Reik y Farruko)	Pop Collaboration of the Year	Won	
Premios Lo Nuestro	2021	"Si Me Dices Que Si" (with Reik y Farruko)	Urban/Pop Song of the Year	Won	
Premios Lo Nuestro	2022	Himself	Artist of the Year	Nominated	
Premios Lo Nuestro	2022	Himself	Pop Artist of the Year	Won	
Premios Lo Nuestro	2022	Mis Manos	Album of the Year	Nominated	
Premios Lo Nuestro	2022	Mis Manos	Pop Album of the Year	Nominated	
Premios Lo Nuestro	2022	"Vida de Rico"	Song of the Year	Nominated	
Premios Lo Nuestro	2022	"Kesi (Remix)" (with Shawn Mendes)	Crossover Collaboration of the Year	Nominated	
Premios Lo Nuestro	2022	"Amén" (with Ricardo Montaner, Evaluna Montaner y Mau y Ricky)	Pop/Ballad Song of the Year	Won	
Premios Lo Nuestro	2022	"Amén" (with Ricardo Montaner, Evaluna Montaner y Mau y Ricky)	Pop Song of the Year	Nominated	
Premios Lo Nuestro	2022	"Vida de Rico"	Pop Song of the Year	Nominated	
Premios Lo Nuestro	2022	"Bebé" (with El Alfa)	Tropical Song of the Year	Won	
Premios Lo Nuestro	2023	Himself	Artist of the Year	Nominated	
Premios Lo Nuestro	2023	Himself	Male Pop Artist of the Year	Nominated	
Premios Lo Nuestro	2023	De Adentro Pa Afuera	Album of the Year	Nominated	
Premios Lo Nuestro	2023	De Adentro Pa Afuera	Pop Album of the Year	Nominated	
Premios Lo Nuestro	2023	"Pegao"	Pop Song of the Year	Nominated	
Premios Lo Nuestro	2023	"Indigo" (with Evaluna Montaner)	Pop Collaboration of the Year	Nominated	
Premios Lo Nuestro	2023	"Buenos Días" (with Wisin y Los Legendarios)	Urban/Pop Song of the Year	Nominated	
Premios Lo Nuestro	2023	"Baloncito Viejo" (with Carlos Vives)	Tropical Collaboration of the Year	Nominated	
Premios Lo Nuestro	2023	De Adentro Pa Afuera World Tour	Tour of the Year	Nominated	
Premios Nuestra Tierra	2020	Himself	Artist of the Year	Nominated	
Premios Nuestra Tierra	2020	Himself	New Artist of the Year	Won	
Premios Nuestra Tierra	2020	Himself	Pop Artist of the Year	Nominated	
Premios Nuestra Tierra	2020	"Tutu" (with Pedro Capó)	Song of the Year	Nominated	
Premios Nuestra Tierra	2020	"Tutu" (with Pedro Capó)	Pop Song of the Year	Nominated	
Premios Nuestra Tierra	2020	"Tutu" (with Pedro Capó)	Audience Favorite Song	Nominated	
Premios Nuestra Tierra	2021	Himself	Artist of the Year	Won	
Premios Nuestra Tierra	2021	Himself	Pop Artist of the Year	Won	
Premios Nuestra Tierra	2021	Himself	Audience Favorite Artist	Nominated	
Premios Nuestra Tierra	2021	"Favorito"	Song of the Year	Nominated	
Premios Nuestra Tierra	2021	"Vida de Rico"	Song of the Year	Nominated	
Premios Nuestra Tierra	2021	"Vida de Rico"	Tropical Song of the Year	Won	
Premios Nuestra Tierra	2021	"Vida de Rico"	Best Video	Nominated	
Premios Nuestra Tierra	2021	"Vida de Rico"	Audience Favorite Song	Nominated	
Premios Nuestra Tierra	2021	Por Primera Vez	Album of the Year	Nominated	
Premios Nuestra Tierra	2021	"Favorito"	Pop Song of the Year	Won	
Premios Nuestra Tierra	2021	Concierto Desde Casa	Concert of the Year	Nominated	
Premios Nuestra Tierra	2022	Himself	Artist of the Year	Nominated	
Premios Nuestra Tierra	2022	Himself	Best Pop Artist	Nominated	
Premios Nuestra Tierra	2022	Himself	Artista Imagen	Nominated	
Premios Nuestra Tierra	2022	Himself	Audience Favorite Artist	Nominated	
Premios Nuestra Tierra	2022	"Indigo" (with Evaluna Montaner)	Song of the Year	Nominated	
Premios Nuestra Tierra	2022	"Indigo" (with Evaluna Montaner)	Best Pop Song	Won	
Premios Nuestra Tierra	2022	Mis Manos	Album of the Year	Nominated	
Premios Nuestra Tierra	2022	Mis Manos Tour	Concert of the Year	Nominated	
Premios Nuestra Tierra	2023	Himself	Best Pop Artist	Nominated	
Premios Nuestra Tierra	2023	"Baloncito Viejo" (with Carlos Vives)	Song of the Year	Nominated	
Premios Nuestra Tierra	2023	De Adentro Pa Afuera	Album of the Year	Nominated	
Premios Nuestra Tierra	2023	"Ambulancia" (with Camila Cabello)	Best Pop Song	Nominated	
Premios Nuestra Tierra	2023	"Alaska" (with Grupo Firme)	Best Popular Song	Nominated	
Premios Nuestra Tierra	2023	"Baloncito Viejo" (with Carlos Vives)	Best Video	Won	
Premios Nuestra Tierra	2023	"Pegao"	Best Video	Nominated	
Premios Odeón	2022	Himself	International Odeon Artist	Nominated	
Premios Odeón	2022	Mis Manos	Best Latin Album	Won	
Premios Quiero	2020	Himself	Best Instagrammer Musician	Nominated	
Premios Quiero	2020	Himself	Best YouTube Channel	Nominated	
Premios Quiero	2020	"Favorito	Best Pop Video	Nominated	
Premios Quiero	2020	"Favorito	Best Male Artist Video	Won	
Premios Quiero	2020	"Tattoo (Remix)" (with Rauw Alejandro)	Best Urban Video	Nominated	
Premios Quiero	2021	"Vida de Rico"	Best Pop Video	Won	
Premios Quiero	2021	"Vida de Rico"	Best Video of the Year	Won	
Premios Quiero	2021	"Bebé" (with El Alfa)	Best Melodic Video	Nominated	
Premios Quiero	2021	"Millones"	Best Male Artist Video	Nominated	
Premios Quiero	2021	"999" (with Selena Gomez)	Best Extraordinary Encounter	Nominated	
Premios Quiero	2022	"Pegao"	Best Male Artist Video	Nominated	
Premios Quiero	2022	"Indigo" (with Evaluna Montaner)	Best Melodic Video	Nominated	
Premios Tu Música Urbano	2020	Himself	Urban Top - Latin American	Nominated	
Premios Tu Música Urbano	2020	"La Boca" (with Mau y Ricky)	Song of the Year — Duo or Group	Won	
Premios Tu Música Urbano	2020	"Tutu" (with Pedro Capó)	Urban Pop Song	Nominated	
Premios Tu Música Urbano	2022	Himself	Top Artist - Pop Urban	Nominated	
Premios Tu Música Urbano	2022	Himself	Top Social Artist	Nominated	
Premios Tu Música Urbano	2022	"Buenos Días" (with Wisin y Los Legendarios)	Song of the Year — Duo or Group	Nominated	
Premios Tu Música Urbano	2022	"Kesi (Remix)" (with Shawn Mendes)	Top Latin Crossover Song	Nominated	
