= Raquel Sofía =

Puerto Rican singer-songwriter (born 1987)

- Raquel Sofía at the 2026 Latin Grammy Awards

Background information
- Born: 12 August 1987 (age 39)
- Origin: Mayaguez, Puerto Rico
- Genre: Latin pop
- Years active: 2012–present

Raquel Sofía is a Puerto Rican singer-songwriter, as well as a Grammy and Latin Grammy Nominee. From 2012 to 2013 Sofía performed backing vocals to Juanes as well as Shakira and Jean Carlos Canela on tour. In 2013, she was featured in advertisements for Target and in 2014 signed to Sony Music Latin releasing her first solo EP and debut album the following year. Raquel Sofía received a nomination for Best New Artist at the 16th Latin Grammy Awards. Before releasing an album, she had already written and performed with some of the most popular & influential artists in the Latin market, including Shakira & Juanes.

== Career ==
Raquel Sofia's abilities extend well past her music; she sings in Spanish and English, and graduated from the recognized University of Miami Frost School of Music.

In 2014, Raquel Sofia launched her solo career, appeared on NPR’s "Tiny Desk Concert" and was picked as the first Latin artist to participate in VEVO's original program "Vevo DSCVR", grossing over 100,000 views in the first 2 weeks.

Raquel's single "Agridulce" grossed over 9.7M streams on Spotify and was chosen as one of Beats Music "Best of 2014 Pop" songs.

In 2015, Raquel Sofia released her first EP "Te Odio Los Sabados". Raquel launched her debut album "Te Quiero Los Domingos" in June of the same year, reaching the number 1 spot on iTunes Latin charts on the first day with purely organic promotion and over 28 million Spotify streams to date.

Raquel was nominated for the 2015 Latin GRAMMY "Best New Artist" category and made her Award show debut performing on the live broadcast in November. Raquel was also chosen as Spotify’s "Artist To Watch" in 2015.

Raquel presented her second album, 2:00 am, in January 2018, an album inspired by jazz, soul and pop, full of intimate lyrics and personal stories that reflect her as an artist and as a woman. The album includes her successful and emotional single "Tenemos Historia" that currently has over 8 million streams

In September 2018, she received a nomination for the 2018 Latin GRAMMY Awards for her second album, 2:00 am, in the category, ‘Best Singer-Songwriter Album’.

In November Raquel kicked off her 2:00 am tour, performing 15 dates throughout Mexico

Adding to all the success Raquel Sofía achieved in 2018, she ended the year on a high note receiving her first nomination to the 61st Annual GRAMMY Awards in the category, ‘Best Latin Pop Album’.

== Albums ==
=== Studio albums ===
- Te Quiero los Domingos (2015)
- 2:00 am (2018)

=== EPS ===
- Te Odio los Sábados (2015)
