= Evaluna Montaner =

Venezuelan actress

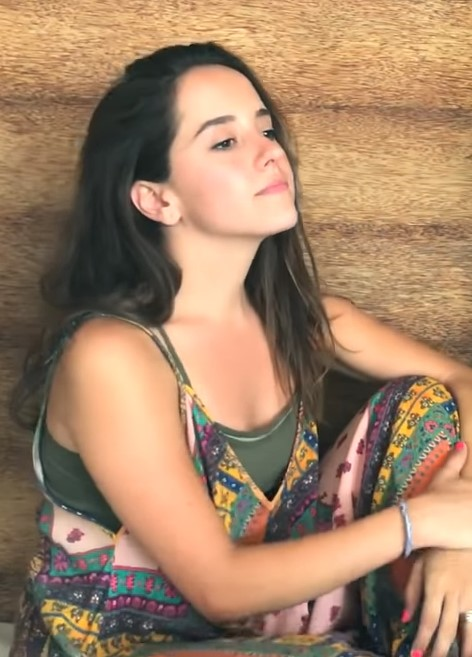
- Montaner in 2017
- Born: Evaluna Mercedes Reglero Rodríguez; 7 August 1997 (age 29); Caracas, Venezuela
- Other name: Evaluna Montaner de Echeverry
- Occupations: Actress; singer; television presenter
- Years active: 2011–present
- Spouse: Camilo Echeverry Correa (m. 2020)
- Children: 2
- Parent: Ricardo Montaner (father) Marlene Rodríguez (mother)
- Relatives: Mau y Ricky (brothers)

Evaluna Mercedes Reglero Rodríguez de Echeverry (born 7 August 1997), known as Evaluna Montaner, is a Venezuelan actress, singer, dancer, television presenter, daughter of singer Ricardo Montaner and younger sister of Mauricio and Ricardo Montaner, known as Mau y Ricky.

== Early life ==
Evaluna was born in Caracas, Venezuela to Ricardo Montaner and Marlene. Since childhood, she learned piano, harp, and various types of dance. She attended The Cushman School until the age of 13, when she began studying at home. She currently lives in Miami.

== Career ==
=== 2011-12: Grachi ===
Evaluna got her first role as a supporting character in Nickelodeon's Latin American series Grachi, playing Melanie Esquivel, the protagonist's sister.

=== 2012: La Gloria de Dios ===
In 2012, Evaluna's father Ricardo Montaner chose to sing the Christian ballad La Gloria de Dios (The Glory of God), in addition to taking her on the tours of Frequent Flyer Tour, which began her career as a singer.

The song was presented for the first time in Argentina, during the tribute programme to Ricardo Montaner in Gracias por venir, gracias por estar.

=== 2013: Si existe ===
Si existe (If it exists) was the name of her first single released in December 2013, made with the help of her mother, the Venezuelan Marlene Rodriguez.

She was the host of the Día a Día program in the segment of La Voz Colombia.

=== 2014-2021: Hot Pursuit, Yo me salvé, and other singles ===
In 2014, she played a supporting role in the movie Hot Pursuit as Teresa Cortez, a teenage girl who has her 15-year-old party, shared the screen with stars Reese Witherspoon and Sofia Vergara.

In July 2014 Evaluna participated in the Christian festival held in Argentina called Jesús Fest where she presented her single, "Yo me salvé" (I Saved Myself), which would be released at the end of 2014 with its English version titled "Wings" and its respective videos.

In 2015 Evaluna performed again at Jesús Fest in Tecnopolis, Argentina, where she sang her songs and made some covers of Christian songs.

In 2018 and after a break of four years without singing, she presented her new singles "Por tu amor" and "Me liberé".

In February 2021, she released another single called "Uno Más Uno".

=== 2019-2021: Club 57 ===
In May 2019, she starred in Club 57, a co-production between Nickelodeon and Rainbow S.r.l. that was filmed in Miami and Italy. Her character, Eva, is a lover of science and mathematics who becomes trapped in 1957 with her brother Rubén (Sebastian Silva). In the series, she performed songs in Spanish, Italian and Portuguese.

=== 2026: Return to solo music ===
On January 23, 2026, Montaner released “Rollitos de Papel,” her fifth solo single, marking her return to solo music after a hiatus from releasing solo material since “Refugio” in 2022.

== Personal life ==
On 8 February 2020, she married her boyfriend of five years, the Colombian singer Camilo Echeverry. They have two daughters, born 2022 and 2024.

== Filmography ==
=== Movies ===
Year	Title	Role	Notes
2015	Hot Pursuit	Teresa Cortez	
2021	Koati	Xochi	Voice role

=== Television ===
Year	Title	Role	Notes
2011–12	Grachi	Melanie Esquivel	Co-star
2013	La Voz Colombia	Herself	
2014	Yo soy el artista	Herself	Influencers
2019–2021	Club 57	Eva García	Main role
2022	La voz kids 7	Herself	Aitana's advisor

== Discography ==
Year	Title	Album	Notes
2012	La gloria de Dios	Viajero frecuente	Together with Ricardo Montaner
2013	Si existe	Not available	Not available
2014	Yo me salvé	Not available	Not available
2014	Wings	Not available	English version of Yo Me Salvé
2016	Gracia Incomparable	Not available	Not available
2018	Por Tu Amor	Not available	Not available
2018	Me Liberé	Not available	Not available
2019	Club 57		Together with the Cast of Club 57

== Videography ==
Year	Title	Character	Notes
2002	Si tuviera que elegir	Principal actress	Song by Ricardo Montaner
2013	Preguntas	Dancer	Song by Mau y Ricky
2013	Si existe	Principal	Song of herself
2014	Su luz	Video member	Song by Ricardo Montaner
2015	Wings	Principal	Song of herself
2015	Yo me salvé	Principal	Song of herself
2016	Gracia incomparable (Acoustic version)	Video member	Song by Evan Craft
2018	Por tu amor	Principal	Song of herself
2018	Me Liberé	Principal	Song of herself
2019	No te vayas	Principal	Song by Camilo
2019	Tutu	Principal	Song by Camilo, Pedro Capó
2019	La Difícil	Participación	Canción de Camilo
2020	Por Primera Vez	Principal	Song in Ensemble with Camilo
2020	Favorito	Principal	Song by Camilo
2020	Tattoo (Remix)	Participación	Song by Rauw Alejandro, Camilo
2020	Vida de rico	Participación	Song by Camilo
2022	Buenos días	Participación	Song by Wisin, Camilo, Los Legendarios
