= Pedro Capó =

Puerto Rican singer (born 1980)

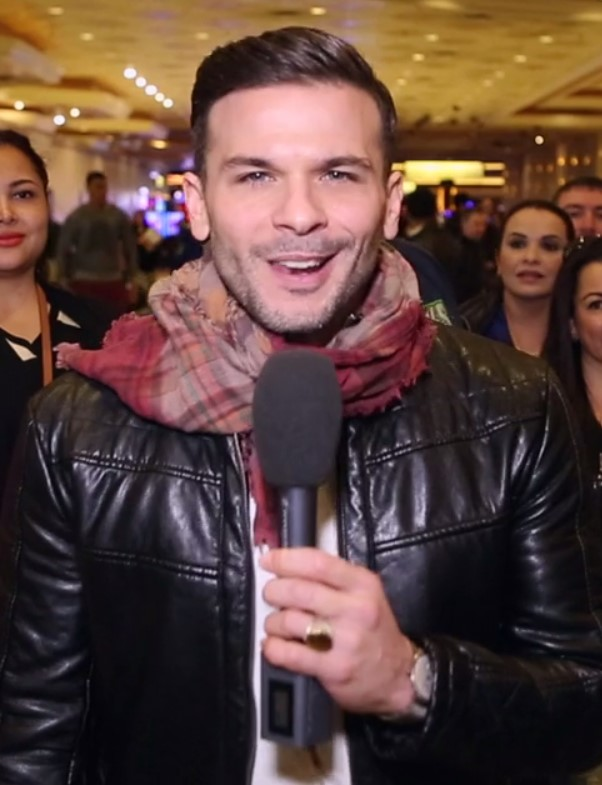
- Capó in 2015

Background information
- Born: Pedro Francisco Rodríguez Sosa; November 14, 1980 (age 45); Santurce, San Juan, Puerto Rico
- Genres: Latin pop; pop rock; dance-pop
- Occupations: Singer; songwriter
- Years active: 2007–present
- Label: Sony Latin
- Website: pedrocapomusica.com

Pedro Francisco Rodríguez Sosa (born November 14, 1980), known professionally as Pedro Capó, is a Puerto Rican singer.

== Biography ==
Pedro is the grandson of singer Bobby Capó and former Miss Puerto Rico Irma Nydia Vázquez. He studied at Colegio Calasanz in Río Piedras, Puerto Rico.

Pedro picked up the guitar at an early age and quickly became proficient in the instrument, later playing guitar in and becoming the main voice of the group Marka Registrada.

Pedro resided in New York, where he starred in musical productions including: Apollo Theatre's production of The Sweet Spot (New York City) and the Off-Broadway hit musical production of CELIA: The Life and Music of Celia Cruz. He has also starred in the films Shut Up And Do It and Paraiso Travel, which is directed by Simón Brand and co-stars John Leguizamo.

In 2009, he performed a duet with popular Mexican singer Thalía called "Estoy Enamorado" from her new album Primera Fila and another duet with the Puerto Rican singer Kany García called "Si Tú Me Lo Pides".

In 2017, Capó joined multiple artists such as Jennifer Lopez, Gloria Estefan, and Rita Moreno on Lin-Manuel Miranda's "Almost Like Praying". All proceeds from the song benefited the Hispanic Federation and its efforts to help those in Puerto Rico affected by Hurricane Maria.

In 2018, after much time in the acting industry, Capó returned to music with a single called "Calma". After Farruko joined him for the remix, the music video became a huge success with more than 2.5 billion views on YouTube as of May 2022. The singer was also awarded his first Latin Grammy Award for Best Long Form Music Video for "Pedro Capó: En Letra de Otro".

== Discography ==
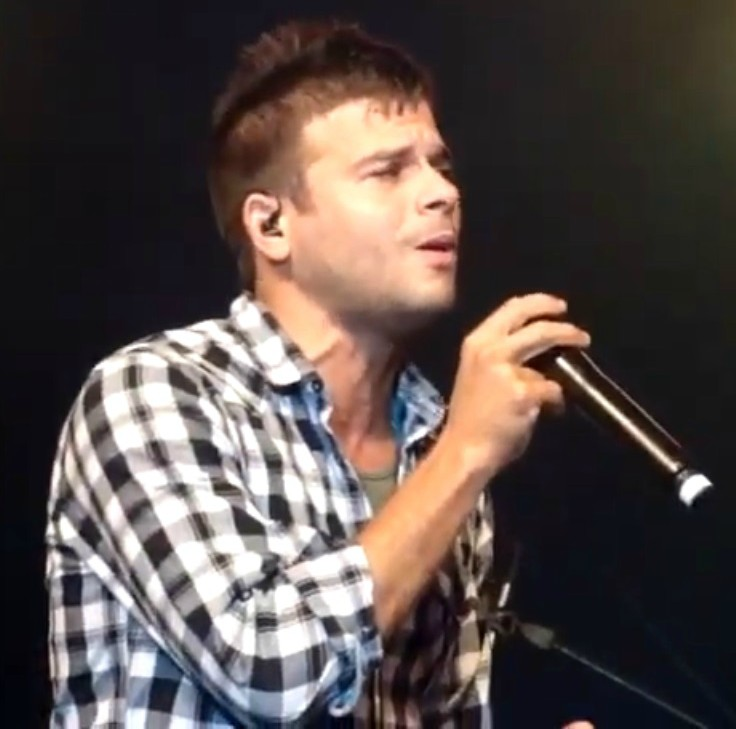
Capó performing in 2011

- Fuego y Amor (2007)
- Pedro Capó (2009)
- Aquila (2014)
- En Letra de Otro (2017)
- Munay (2020)
- La Neta (2022)
- La carretera (2025)

== Awards ==
Capó has won two ASCAP Awards, for "Fiebre de Amor" (2013) and "La Mordidita" (2016). He has also won 3 Latin Grammy Awards including Song of the Year for "Calma".

== Grammy Awards ==
Year	Category	Work	Result
2024	Best Latin Pop Album	La Neta	Nominated

== Latin Grammy Awards ==
Year	Category	Work	Result
2015	Best Pop Vocal Album	Aquila	Nominated
2018	Best Long Form Music Video	En Letra De Otro - Documentary	Won
2019	Song of the Year	"Calma"	Won
2019	Best Urban Fusion/Performance	"Calma (Remix)"	Won
2021	Best Pop Vocal Album	Munay	Nominated
