= En Acústico =

Live album by Pablo Alborán
- Released: November 15, 2011
- Recorded: 2011, Madrid
- Genre: Latin pop
- Length: 74:26
- Language: Spanish
- Label: EMI Music

Pablo Alborán chronology
Pablo Alborán (2011)	En Acústico (2011)	Tanto (2012)

Singles from En Acústico
- 1. "Perdóname" Released: October 3, 2011; 2. "Te He Echado de Menos" Released: February 28, 2012

En Acústico is the first live album by Spanish singer-songwriter Pablo Alborán. Following by success of his first self-named studio album, Pablo Alborán, he released this album on November 15, 2011. It included acoustic versions of most of the tracks in his debut album, as well as two new songs ("Te He Echado De Menos" and "No Te Olvidaré") and four bonus tracks. The song "Perdóname" (Forgive Me) was re-recorded featuring Portuguese singer Carminho, and was released as the first single of the album, peaking at number one on the Spanish singles chart on November 13, 2011, thus helping En Acústico to debut also at number one on the albums chart one week later, on November 20, 2011, and to top the Portuguese Albums Chart in January 2012.

== Track listing ==
CD

1. "Desencuentro"
2. "Solamente Tú"
3. "Miedo"
4. "Caramelo"
5. "Vuelve Conmigo"
6. "Me Colé Por La Puerta De Atrás"
7. "Volver a Empezar"
8. "Loco de Atar"
9. "Ladrona de Mi Piel"
10. "No Te Olvidaré"
11. "Perdóname"
12. "Te He Echado de Menos"
13. "Cuando Te Alejas"
14. "Solamente Tú" (with Diana Navarro)
15. "Perdóname" (with Carminho) (In Portuguese)
16. "Perdóname" (with Carminho)
17. "No Te Olvidaré"

DVD

1. "Desencuentro"
2. "Solamente Tú"
3. "Miedo"
4. "Caramelo"
5. "Vuelve Conmigo"
6. "Me Colé Por La Puerta De Atrás"
7. "Volver a Empezar"
8. "Loco de Atar"
9. "Ladrona de Mi Piel"
10. "No Te Olvidaré"
11. "Perdóname"
12. "Te He Echado de Menos"
13. "Cuando Te Alejas"
14. "Solamente Tú" (with Diana Navarro)
15. "Perdóname" (with Carmine) (In Portuguese)
16. "Perdóname" (with Carminho)
17. "Entrevista"

== Charts ==
=== Weekly charts ===
Chart performance for En Acústico
Chart (2011–15)	Peak position
Portuguese Albums (AFP)	1
Spanish Albums (PROMUSICAE)	1

=== Year-end charts ===
Year-end chart performance for En Acústico
Chart (2011)	Position
Spanish Albums (PROMUSICAE)	6

Chart (2012)	Position
Spanish Albums (PROMUSICAE)	2

Chart (2013)	Position
Spanish Albums (PROMUSICAE)	10

== Certifications ==
Certifications for En Acústico
Region	Certification	Certified units/sales
Portugal (AFP)	7× Platinum	105,000^{^}
Spain (PROMUSICAE)	8× Platinum	320,000^{^}
^{^} Shipments figures based on certification alone.
