= List of number-one albums of 2005 (Spain) =

Top 100 España is a record chart published weekly by PROMUSICAE (Productores de Música de España), a non-profit organization composed by Spain and multinational record companies. This association tracks record sales (physical and digital) in Spain.

== Albums ==
Chart date	Album	Artist	Reference
January 3	No Me Toques Las Palmas Que Me Conozco	María Isabel	
January 10	No Me Toques Las Palmas Que Me Conozco	María Isabel	
January 17	No Me Toques Las Palmas Que Me Conozco	María Isabel	
January 24	No Me Toques Las Palmas Que Me Conozco	María Isabel	
January 31	Velvetina	Miguel Bosé	
February 7	It's Time	Michael Bublé	
February 14	El Ruido y la Furia	Héroes del Silencio	
February 21	El Ruido y la Furia	Héroes del Silencio	
February 28	Los Chicos del Coro B.S.O.	Les Choristes	
March 7	SJK	Santa Justa Klan	
March 14	Pájaros en la cabeza	Amaral	
March 21	Pájaros en la cabeza	Amaral	
March 28	Pájaros en la cabeza	Amaral	
April 4	Pájaros en la cabeza	Amaral	
April 11	Pájaros en la cabeza	Amaral	
April 18	Pájaros en la cabeza	Amaral	
April 25	Que el cielo espere sentao	Melendi	
May 2	Que el cielo espere sentao	Melendi	
May 9	Caricias al alma	Bustamante	
May 16	Caricias al alma	Bustamante	
May 23	Caricias al alma	Bustamante	
May 30	Caricias al alma	Bustamante	
June 6	Fijación Oral	Shakira	
June 13	Fijación Oral	Shakira	
June 20	Zapatillas	El Canto del Loco	
June 27	Zapatillas	El Canto del Loco	
July 4	Zapatillas	El Canto del Loco	
July 11	Zapatillas	El Canto del Loco	
July 18	Zapatillas	El Canto del Loco	
July 25	Zapatillas	El Canto del Loco	
August 1	Pasión de Gavilanes B.S.O.	Ángela María Forero y Andrea Villareal	
August 8	Pasión de Gavilanes B.S.O.	Ángela María Forero y Andrea Villareal	
August 15	Pasión de Gavilanes B.S.O.	Ángela María Forero y Andrea Villareal	
August 22	Pasión de Gavilanes B.S.O.	Ángela María Forero y Andrea Villareal	
August 29	Pasión de Gavilanes B.S.O.	Ángela María Forero y Andrea Villareal	
September 5	Pasión de Gavilanes B.S.O.	Ángela María Forero y Andrea Villareal	
September 12	Pasión de Gavilanes B.S.O.	Ángela María Forero y Andrea Villareal	
September 19	Alivio de Luto	Joaquín Sabina	
September 26	Alivio de Luto	Joaquín Sabina	
October 3	OT Musicales	Operación Triunfo	
October 10	Batuka Latin	Batuka	
October 17	Batuka Latin	Batuka	
October 24	Batuka Latin	Batuka	
October 31	Batuka Latin	Batuka	
November 7	Ancora	Il Divo	
November 14	Confessions on a Dance Floor	Madonna	
November 21	Voces de Ultratumba	Estopa	
November 28	Voces de Ultratumba	Estopa	
December 5	Voces de Ultratumba	Estopa	
December 12	Voces de Ultratumba	Estopa	
December 19	Ancora	Il Divo	
December 26	Ancora	Il Divo	

== See also ==
- List of number-one singles of 2005 (Spain)
