= Maria (Carminho album) =

Studio album by Carminho
- Released: November 30, 2018
- Genre: Fado
- Label: Warner Music Portugal

Carminho chronology
Carminho canta Tom Jobim (2016)	Maria (2018)

Maria is the fifth album by fado singer Carminho. It was released in 2018 by Warner Music Portugal. A review in PopMatters noted: "Taking a far more intimate approach to the record–writing most of the songs and lyrics and producing the album herself–she succeeds by making Maria a testament to the power of fado as well as a stunning examination of her musical prowess." The album peaked at No. 4 on the Associação Fonográfica Portuguesa chart and was certified as a gold album.

== Track listing ==
1. A Tecedeira (Carminho) [2:31]
2. O Começo [Fado Bizarro] (Acácio Gomes) [2:48]
3. Desengano [Fado Latino] (Jaime Santos) [1:49]
4. O Menino e a Cidade (Joana Espadinha) [3:48]
5. Estrela (Carminho) [4:39]
6. Pop Fado (Fernando de Carvalho) [2:34]
7. A Mulher Vento (Carminho) [3:27]
8. Poeta (Carminho) [2:48]
9. Se Vieres [Fado Sta. Luzia] (Armando Machado) [3:27]
10. Quero um Cavalo de Várias Cores (Carminho) [3:29]
11. Sete Saias (Artur Ribeiro) [3:06]
12. As Rosas (Joana Espadinha) [3:39]
