= Pablo Alborán (album) =

Studio album by Pablo Alborán
- Released: 28 January 2011
- Length: 46:30
- Language: Spanish
- Label: Warner Music Spain
- Producer: Armando Ávila; Manuel Illán

Pablo Alborán chronology
Pablo Alborán (2011)	En Acústico (2011)

Singles from Pablo Alborán
- 1. "Solamente Tú" Released: 14 September 2010; 2. "Miedo" Released: 13 May 2011

Professional ratings
Review scores
Source	Rating
AllMusic	3.5/5 stars

Pablo Alborán is the debut album by Spanish singer-songwriter Pablo Alborán. Produced by Manuel Illán, many of the songs included in the album had already achieved YouTube attention before its release, as home videos featuring Alborán performing in front of a webcam, alone with his guitar. The album also includes duets with Carminho ("Perdóname"), Estrella Morente ("Desencuentro"), and Diana Navarro ("Solamente Tú"). The iTunes version adds the bonus track "Cuando te Alejas".

Pablo Alborán was released on 1 February 2011, and quickly became a huge success on the Spanish Albums Chart, where it debuted at number one, preventing Sergio Dalma's Via Dalma, the best-selling album of 2010 in Spain, from an 11th consecutive week topping the charts. Pablo Alborán went on to spend 15 weeks at the top of the charts, including a run of seven consecutive weeks taking place six months after the album's release date. It was certified six-time platinum by Productores de Música de España, becoming the top-selling album of 2011 in Spain, and was also nominated for a Latin Grammy Award for Best Pop Vocal Album, Male.

== Singles ==
- "Solamente Tú" was released as the album's lead single on 14 September 2010. The song was a huge hit on the Spanish Singles Chart, becoming Alborán's first-ever number-one single on 27 February 2011. It stayed at number one for two consecutive weeks, and was certified platinum on 8 May 2011. It went on to stay on the Top 10 for 32 consecutive weeks, from February to September, including 20 weeks on the Top 5.
- "Miedo" was released as the album's second single on 13 May 2011. The song peaked at number 43 on the Spanish Singles Chart.

== Track listing ==
All tracks are written by Pablo Alborán

No.	Title	Length
1.	"Solamente tú"	4:08
2.	"Miedo"	3:44
3.	"Vuelve conmigo"	3:59
4.	"Caramelo"	4:22
5.	"Volver a empezar"	3:28
6.	"Me colé por la puerta de atrás"	3:27
7.	"Desencuentro"	3:57
8.	"Perdóname (featuring Carminho)"	4:11
9.	"Ladrona de mi piel"	3:38
10.	"Loco de atar"	3:35
11.	"Desencuentro (featuring Estrella Morente)"	3:57
12.	"Solamente tú (featuring Diana Navarro)"	4:07
13.	"Cuando te alejas (iTunes Bonus Track)"	3:29

== Charts ==
=== Weekly charts ===
Weekly chart performance for Pablo Alborán
Chart (2011)	Peak position
Mexican Albums (Top 100 Mexico)	50
Portuguese Albums (AFP)	6
Spanish Albums (PROMUSICAE)	1
US Top Latin Albums (Billboard)	55
US Latin Pop Albums (Billboard)	16

=== Year-end charts ===
2011 year-end chart performance for Pablo Alborán
Chart (2011)	Position
Spanish Albums (PROMUSICAE)	1

2012 year-end chart performance for Pablo Alborán
Chart (2012)	Position
Spanish Albums (PROMUSICAE)	5

== Certifications ==
Certifications for Pablo Alborán
Region	Certification	Certified units/sales
Colombia (ASINCOL)	Gold	
Spain (PROMUSICAE)	9× Platinum	540,000^{‡}
^{‡} Sales+streaming figures based on certification alone.

== Release history ==
Release history for Pablo Alborán
Region	Date	Format	Label	Ref(s)
Spain	28 January 2011	CD; digital download	EMI Music Spain	

== See also ==
- List of number-one albums of 2011 (Spain)
