= Directo En Tus Manos =

Live album by Carlos Baute
- Released: September 8, 2009
- Recorded: June 25, 2009
- Genre: Latin pop
- Label: Warner Music

Carlos Baute chronology
De Mi Puño y Letra (2008)	Directo En Tus Manos (2009)	Amarte Bien (2010)

Directo En Tus Manos is the first live album released by Venezuelan singer-songwriter Carlos Baute. The album was released by Warner Music on September 8, 2009. It was filmed on the live show Baute presented on the Palacio de Vistalegre in Madrid on June 25, 2009. The show included guest appearances of Nek, Pastora Soler, Alex Ubago and Marta Sánchez.

== Track listing ==
All tracks are written by Carlos Baute

No.	Title	Writer(s)	Length
1.	"Donde Esta el Amor Que No Duele"	Baute	4:04
2.	"Estas Hecha Para Mi"	Baute	3:34
3.	"Quien Dice Que No Duele"	Baute	4:24
4.	"Llevas en Tus Genes la Mentira"	Baute	5:33
5.	"Nada Se Compara a Ti" (featuring Nek)	Baute	4:05
6.	"Pobre Diabla"	Landro	3:56
7.	"En Nuestro Aniversario" (featuring Pastora Soler)	Baute	3:38
8.	"Angelito"	Coti, Pablo Duchovny, Cachorro Lopez	3:31
9.	"Mi Medicina"	Baute, Yasmil Marrufo	4:31
10.	"Mueve, Mueve"	Baute, Marrufo	4:50
11.	"Te Extraño Porque Te Extraño"	Baute	4:06
12.	"No Me Abandones Amiga Mia"	Baute	4:50
13.	"Tu No Sabes Que Tanto" (featuring Alex Ubago)	Baute	6:14
14.	"Dame de Eso"	Baute, Yasmil Marrufo	4:23
15.	"Te Regalo"	Baute	5:16
16.	"Colgando En Tus Manos" (featuring Marta Sánchez)	Baute	8:37

== Charts ==
Directo En Tus Manos reached No. 6 in Spain and No. 45 in Mexico.

Chart (2009–10)	Peak position
Spanish Albums Chart	6
Mexican Albums Chart	45

== Release history ==
Country	Date	Format(s)	Label
United States	September 8, 2009	Digital download	Warner Music Group
Canada	September 8, 2009	Digital download	Warner Music Group
Mexico	September 8, 2009	Digital download	Warner Music Group
Spain	September 8, 2009	Digital download	Warner Music Group
Venezuela	September 8, 2009	Digital download	Warner Music Group
Italy	September 8, 2009	Digital download	Warner Music Group
United Kingdom	September 8, 2009	Digital download	Warner Music Group
Germany	September 8, 2009	Digital download	Warner Music Group
France	September 8, 2009	Digital download	Warner Music Group
Ireland	September 8, 2009	Digital download	Warner Music Group
