= Amarte Bien =

Studio album by Carlos Baute
- Released: November 23, 2010
- Recorded: 2009–2010
- Studio: Cosmos Studios (Mexico City, Mexico); Eme Studios (Santo Domingo, Dominican Republic); Estudios Liqu2 (Caracas, Venezuela)
- Genre: Latin pop
- Length: 37:46
- Label: Warner Music Spain
- Producer: Armando Ávila · Juan Carlos Noguel · Carlos Baute

Carlos Baute chronology
Directo En Tus Manos (2009)	Amarte Bien (2010)

Singles from Amarte Bien
- 1. "Quién Te Quiere Como Yo" Released: October 11, 2010; 2. "Amarte Bien" Released: January 31, 2011; 3. "Tu Cuerpo Bailando en Mi Cuerpo" Released: June 13, 2011

Amarte Bien is a studio album recorded by Venezuelan singer-songwriter Carlos Baute. The album was released by Warner Music Spain on November 23, 2010 (see 2010 in music). It was recorded in Mexico City and produced by Juan Carlos Noguel, Armando Ávila and Baute.

Carlos Baute commented that he wanted that "when people listen to my album, they feel happy. They're very fresh songs, that go directly through the heart." Website 7días stated that the singer, with Amarte Bien, "returns to his origins recovering that folklore rhythm from his land, which shot him to fame back in 1994." Mariano Prunes from Allmusic stated that "Amarte Bien is brimming with the light pop and positive messages characteristic of the artist."

The album contained the hit singles "Quién Te Quiere Como Yo", "Amarte Bien" and "Tu Cuerpo Bailando en Mi Cuerpo". "Quién Te Quiere Como Yo" reached No.26 on the Billboard Latin Songs chart and No.6 Latin Pop Songs chart, while the second, "Amarte Bien", also reached No.28 on that list. "Quien Te Quiere Como Yo" also reached No.2 on the Spanish Singles Chart, and "Amarte Bien" reached No.18 on that chart.

Amarte Bien became another commercial success for Carlos Baute. In Spain, the album reached No.3, almost reaching the peak position of its predecessor, De Mi Puño y Letra, which reached No.2. Although, it was a moderate hit in Mexico, only reaching No.39 on the Mexican Albums Chart.

== Track listing ==
All tracks are written by Carlos Baute.

No.	Title	Length
1.	"Amarte Bien"	3:25
2.	"Cuando Tu No Estas"	3:57
3.	"Quien Te Quiere Como Yo"	3:44
4.	"Todo Se Olvida"	4:00
5.	"Quedate un Poquito Mas"	3:28
6.	"Tu Amor Despierta Cosas Bonitas"	3:51
7.	"Loquitos de Amor"	3:47
8.	"Tu Cuerpo Bailando en Mi Cuerpo"	4:17
9.	"Te Ofrezco Todo Lo Que Soy"	4:02
10.	"Ni Bien Ni Mal, Sino Todo Lo Contrario"	3:14

iTunes LP
No.	Title	Length
1.	"Amarte Bien"	3:25
2.	"Cuando Tu No Estas"	3:57
3.	"Quien Te Quiere Como Yo"	3:44
4.	"Todo Se Olvida"	4:00
5.	"Quedate un Poquito Mas"	3:28
6.	"Tu Amor Despierta Cosas Bonitas"	3:51
7.	"Loquitos de Amor"	3:47
8.	"Tu Cuerpo Bailando en Mi Cuerpo" (acoustic)	4:17
9.	"Te Ofrezco Todo Lo Que Soy"	4:02
10.	"Ni Bien Ni Mal, Sino Todo Lo Contrario"	3:14
11.	"Alborotaste Mis Sentimientos"	3:24
12.	"Sueño Con Poderte Encontrar"	3:57
13.	"Tu Cuerpo Bailando en Mi Cuerpo"	4:17
14.	"Quien Te Quiere Como Yo" (acoustic)	3:46

== Personnel ==
- Armando Ávila – arrangements, chorus, piano
- Iván Barrera – arrangements, soloist, violin
- Javo Barrera – drums
- Carlos Baute – lead vocals, arrangements, composer, chorus, lyrics
- Luis Bustamante – arrangements, chorus
- Rene Camacho – chorus
- Bernie Grundman – Mastering
- Enrique "Bugs" Hernández – drums
- Joel Hernández – Bongos, Cajon, Conga, chorus, Djembe, Udu
- Roger Hudson – chorus
- Juan Carlos Mougel – arrangements, piano
- Vanesa Pinedo – chorus
- Franklin Rivero – chorus
- Txema Rosique – A&R
- Sergio "El Guiñapo García" – chorus

Source: Allmusic

== Chart performance ==
=== Weekly charts ===
Chart (2010)	Peak position
Spanish Albums Chart	3
Mexican Albums Chart	39
US Latin Pop Albums (Billboard)	20

=== Yearly charts ===
Chart (2011)	Peak position
Spanish Album Charts	49

== Release history ==
Country	Date	Format(s)	Label	Edition(s)
United States	November 20, 2010	Digital download	Warner Music Group	Standard Edition
Canada	November 20, 2010	Digital download	Warner Music Group	Standard Edition
Spain	November 20, 2010	Digital download	Warner Music Group	Standard Edition
Venezuela	November 20, 2010	Digital download	Warner Music Group	Standard Edition
Mexico	November 20, 2010	Digital download	Warner Music Group	Standard Edition
United Kingdom	November 20, 2010	Digital download	Warner Music Group	Standard Edition
Germany	November 20, 2010	Digital download	Warner Music Group	Standard Edition
Italy	November 20, 2010	Digital download	Warner Music Group	Standard Edition
Colombia	November 20, 2010	Digital download	Warner Music Group	Standard Edition
France	November 20, 2010	Digital download	Warner Music Group	Standard Edition
Argentina	November 20, 2010	Digital download	Warner Music Group	Standard Edition
Chile	November 20, 2010	Digital download	Warner Music Group	Standard Edition
United States	November 22, 2010	Digital download	Warner Music Group	iTunes LP
France	November 22, 2010	Digital download	Warner Music Group	iTunes LP
United Kingdom	November 22, 2010	Digital download	Warner Music Group	iTunes LP
Mexico	November 22, 2010	Digital download	Warner Music Group	iTunes LP
Italy	November 22, 2010	Digital download	Warner Music Group	iTunes LP
Venezuela	November 22, 2010	Digital download	Warner Music Group	iTunes LP
Spain	November 22, 2010	Digital download	Warner Music Group	iTunes LP
Argentina	November 22, 2010	Digital download	Warner Music Group	iTunes LP
Costa Rica	November 22, 2010	Digital download	Warner Music Group	iTunes LP
Brazil	November 22, 2010	Digital download	Warner Music Group	iTunes LP
