= List of number-one singles of 2011 (Spain) =

This lists the singles that reached number one on the Spanish Promusicae sales and airplay charts in 2011. Total sales correspond to the data sent by regular contributors to sales volumes and by digital distributors. There is a two-day difference between the reporting period from sales outlets and from radio stations. For example, the report period for the first full week of 2011 ended on January 9 for sales and on January 7 for airplay.

== Chart history ==
Week	Top-selling				Week	Most airplay			
Week	Issue date	Artist(s)	Song	Reference(s)	Week	Issue date	Artist(s)	Song	Reference(s)
1	January 9	Shakira (feat. El Cata)	"Loca"		1	January 7	Shakira (feat. El Cata)	"Loca"	
2	January 16	Shakira (feat. El Cata)	"Loca"		2	January 14	Melendi	"Barbie de Extrarradio"	
3	January 23	Shakira (feat. El Cata)	"Loca"		3	January 21	Shakira (feat. El Cata)	"Loca"	
4	January 30	The Black Eyed Peas	"The Time (Dirty Bit)"		4	January 28	Shakira	"Sale el Sol"	
5	February 6	The Black Eyed Peas	"The Time (Dirty Bit)"		5	February 4	Shakira	"Sale el Sol"	
6	February 13	Lady Gaga	"Born This Way"		6	February 11	Rihanna	"Only Girl (In the World)"	
7	February 20	Lady Gaga	"Born This Way"		7	February 18	Michael Jackson (feat. Akon)	"Hold My Hand"	
8	February 27	Pablo Alborán	"Solamente Tú"		8	February 25	Eminem (feat. Rihanna)	"Love the Way You Lie"	
9	March 6	Pablo Alborán	"Solamente Tú"		9	March 4	Eminem (feat. Rihanna)	"Love the Way You Lie"	
10	March 13	Jennifer Lopez (feat. Pitbull)	"On the Floor"		10	March 11	Enrique Iglesias (feat. Ludacris and DJ Frank E)	"Tonight (I'm Lovin' You)"	
11	March 20	Jennifer Lopez (feat. Pitbull)	"On the Floor"		11	March 18	Shakira	"Sale el Sol"	
12	March 27	Jennifer Lopez (feat. Pitbull)	"On the Floor"		12	March 25	Malú	"Blanco y Negro"	
13	April 3	Jennifer Lopez (feat. Pitbull)	"On the Floor"		13	April 1	Malú	"Blanco y Negro"	
14	April 10	Jennifer Lopez (feat. Pitbull)	"On the Floor"		14	April 8	Malú	"Blanco y Negro"	
15	April 17	Jennifer Lopez (feat. Pitbull)	"On the Floor"		15	April 15	Lady Gaga	"Born This Way"	
16	April 24	Jennifer Lopez (feat. Pitbull)	"On the Floor"		16	April 22	Lady Gaga	"Born This Way"	
17	May 1	Jennifer Lopez (feat. Pitbull)	"On the Floor"		17	April 29	Jennifer Lopez (feat. Pitbull)	"On the Floor"	
18	May 8	Jennifer Lopez (feat. Pitbull)	"On the Floor"		18	May 6	Jennifer Lopez (feat. Pitbull)	"On the Floor"	
19	May 15	Jennifer Lopez (feat. Pitbull)	"On the Floor"		19	May 13	Jennifer Lopez (feat. Pitbull)	"On the Floor"	
20	May 22	Jennifer Lopez (feat. Pitbull)	"On the Floor"		20	May 20	Jennifer Lopez (feat. Pitbull)	"On the Floor"	
21	May 29	Jennifer Lopez (feat. Pitbull)	"On the Floor"		21	May 27	Jennifer Lopez (feat. Pitbull)	"On the Floor"	
22	June 5	Jennifer Lopez (feat. Pitbull)	"On the Floor"		22	June 3	Jennifer Lopez (feat. Pitbull)	"On the Floor"	
23	June 12	Jennifer Lopez (feat. Pitbull)	"On the Floor"		23	June 10	Jennifer Lopez (feat. Pitbull)	"On the Floor"	
24	June 19	Jennifer Lopez (feat. Pitbull)	"On the Floor"		24	June 17	Jennifer Lopez (feat. Pitbull)	"On the Floor"	
25	June 26	Shakira (feat. Pitbull)	"Rabiosa"		25	June 24	Jennifer Lopez (feat. Pitbull)	"On the Floor"	
26	July 3	Shakira (feat. Pitbull)	"Rabiosa"		26	July 1	Jennifer Lopez (feat. Pitbull)	"On the Floor"	
27	July 10	Shakira (feat. Pitbull)	"Rabiosa"		27	July 8	Pitbull (feat. Ne-Yo, Afrojack and Nayer)	"Give Me Everything"	
28	July 17	Shakira (feat. Pitbull)	"Rabiosa"		28	July 15	Jennifer Lopez (feat. Pitbull)	"On the Floor"	
29	July 24	Shakira (feat. Pitbull)	"Rabiosa"		29	July 22	LMFAO (feat. Lauren Bennett and GoonRock)	"Party Rock Anthem"	
30	July 31	Don Omar & Lucenzo	"Danza Kuduro"		30	July 29	Pitbull (feat. Ne-Yo, Afrojack and Nayer)	"Give Me Everything"	
31	August 7	Don Omar & Lucenzo	"Danza Kuduro"		31	August 5	Pitbull (feat. Ne-Yo, Afrojack and Nayer)	"Give Me Everything"	
32	August 14	Don Omar & Lucenzo	"Danza Kuduro"		32	August 12	LMFAO (feat. Lauren Bennett and GoonRock)	"Party Rock Anthem"	
33	August 21	Don Omar & Lucenzo	"Danza Kuduro"		33	August 19	Pitbull (feat. Ne-Yo, Afrojack and Nayer)	"Give Me Everything"	
34	August 28	Don Omar & Lucenzo	"Danza Kuduro"		34	August 26	Pitbull (feat. Ne-Yo, Afrojack and Nayer)	"Give Me Everything"	
35	September 4	Don Omar & Lucenzo	"Danza Kuduro"		35	September 2	Pitbull (feat. Ne-Yo, Afrojack and Nayer)	"Give Me Everything"	
36	September 11	Don Omar & Lucenzo	"Danza Kuduro"		36	September 9	Pitbull (feat. Ne-Yo, Afrojack and Nayer)	"Give Me Everything"	
37	September 18	Don Omar & Lucenzo	"Danza Kuduro"		37	September 16	Pitbull (feat. Ne-Yo, Afrojack and Nayer)	"Give Me Everything"	
38	September 25	Don Omar & Lucenzo	"Danza Kuduro"		38	September 23	Britney Spears	"Till the World Ends"	
39	October 2	Pitbull (feat. Marc Anthony)	"Rain Over Me"		39	September 30	Pitbull (feat. Ne-Yo, Afrojack and Nayer)	"Give Me Everything"	
40	October 9	Pitbull (feat. Marc Anthony)	"Rain Over Me"		40	October 7	Maroon 5 (feat. Christina Aguilera)	"Moves Like Jagger"	
41	October 16	Juan Magán (feat. Crossfire)	"Bailando por Ahí"		41	October 14	Maroon 5 (feat. Christina Aguilera)	"Moves Like Jagger"	
42	October 23	Pitbull (feat. Marc Anthony)	"Rain Over Me"		42	October 21	Paulina Rubio	"Me Gustas Tanto"	
43	October 30	Pitbull (feat. Marc Anthony)	"Rain Over Me"		43	October 28	Maroon 5 (feat. Christina Aguilera)	"Moves Like Jagger"	
44	November 6	Pitbull (feat. Marc Anthony)	"Rain Over Me"		44	November 4	Maroon 5 (feat. Christina Aguilera)	"Moves Like Jagger"	
45	November 13	Pablo Alborán (feat. Carminho)	"Perdóname"		45	November 11	Maroon 5 (feat. Christina Aguilera)	"Moves Like Jagger"	
46	November 20	Pablo Alborán (feat. Carminho)	"Perdóname"		46	November 18	Maroon 5 (feat. Christina Aguilera)	"Moves Like Jagger"	
47	November 27	Michel Teló	"Ai Se Eu Te Pego"		47	November 25	Maroon 5 (feat. Christina Aguilera)	"Moves Like Jagger"	
48	December 4	Michel Teló	"Ai Se Eu Te Pego"		48	December 2	Enrique Iglesias (feat. Pitbull and The WAV.s)	"I Like How It Feels"	
49	December 11	Michel Teló	"Ai Se Eu Te Pego"		49	December 9	Shakira	"Antes de las Seis"	
50	December 18	Michel Teló	"Ai Se Eu Te Pego"		50	December 16	Maroon 5 (feat. Christina Aguilera)	"Moves Like Jagger"	
51	December 25	Michel Teló	"Ai Se Eu Te Pego"		51	December 23	Maroon 5 (feat. Christina Aguilera)	"Moves Like Jagger"	
52	January 1	Michel Teló	"Ai Se Eu Te Pego"		52	December 30	Maroon 5 (feat. Christina Aguilera)	"Moves Like Jagger"	
