= As Pedras da Minha Rua =

Single by Carminho

from the album Alma
- Released: March 2012
- Genre: Fado
- Length: 5:21
- Label: Parlophone
- Songwriter: Eduardo Damas
- Producer: Diogo Clemente

Carminho singles chronology
"As Pedras da Minha Rua" (2012)	"Bom Dia, Amor (Carta de Maria José)" (2012)

"As Pedras da Minha Rua" (transl. The Stones of My Street) is the first single by Portuguese fado singer Carminho, taken from her second album, Alma. It was released in March 2012. It is a version of a classical fado, originally sung by Fernanda Maria.

== Video ==
The music video was directed by Enrique Escamilla. It was shot in a desolated quarry in the outskirts of Lisbon, and not in one of the streets of Lisbon to which the lyrics allude. Carminho is depicted walking and singing about the missing love of the lyrics during the video. The concept video starts with a young couple, a blonde girl and her boyfriend, in a heated discussion in the front seat of his car, after which she is shown ambulating by the desolated landscape, along with a female companion. The two girls, who are believed to be friends, are shown into several actions of intimacy, presumably to help her forget her sorrow, including the burning of a teddy, the capture of a chicken and palm reading. The blonde girl is seen later leaning in her friend's lap, with a melancholic gaze. Finally, the two friends embrace each other tenderly as she bids farewell to return to her boyfriend. Her friend is left alone in the quarry and her look mirrors the sense of yearning of the final lyrics.

A possible interpretation of the video is that the quarry is meant to symbolize the sense of emptiness and desolation of the lyrics, originally alluding to a street of Lisbon.

== Track listing ==
Digital download
No.	Title	Length
1.	"As Pedras da Minha Rua"	5:21
