= Peligroso =

Peligroso may refer to:

- Peligroso (Hamlet album), 1992
- Peligroso (Carlos Baute album), 2004
