= Perdóname (Pablo Alborán song) =

Single by Pablo Alborán featuring Carminho

from the album En Acústico
- Released: 3 October 2011
- Recorded: 2010–11
- Genre: Fado
- Length: 4:16
- Label: EMI Music
- Songwriter(s): Pablo Alborán
- Producer(s): Manuel Illán

Pablo Alborán singles chronology
"Miedo" (2011)	"Perdóname" (2011)	"Cuestión de Príoridades por el Cuerno de África" (2012)

"Perdóname" is a song by Latin Grammy nominated Spanish singer Pablo Alborán, from his self-titled debut album. A concert in Madrid in May 2011 was recorded as a duet with Carminho and released the lead single from his live album, En Acústico in November 2011.

The live single was released on 3 October 2011 as a digital download in Spain. The song was written by Pablo Alborán and produced by Manuel Illán. It features a duet with Portuguese fado singer Carminho.

The song is the theme of the Brazilian telenovela A Lei do Amor starring Cláudia Abreu and Reynaldo Gianecchini.

== Video ==
The music video was shot in Lisbon, Portugal, and features Alborán and Carminho ambulating by some of the most typical sights of the Portuguese capital.

== Track listing ==
Digital download
No.	Title	Length
1.	"Perdóname"	4:16

== Chart performance ==
The song debuted at number 7 on the Spanish Singles Chart on the week of release, and reached the top spot on 13 November 2011, becoming Alborán's second number-one single.

=== Weekly charts ===
Chart (2011)	Peak position
Spain (PROMUSICAE)	1
Portugal Digital Songs (Billboard)	1

=== Year-end charts ===
End Of Year (2012)	Peak position
Spain (PROMUSICAE)	8

== Certifications and sales ==
Certifications and sales for "Perdóname"
Region	Certification	Certified units/sales
Portugal	—	25,000
Spain (PROMUSICAE)	Platinum	40,000^{*}
^{*} Sales figures based on certification alone.

== Release history ==
Region	Date	Format	Label
Spain	3 October 2011	Digital download	EMI Music

== See also ==
- List of number-one singles of 2011 (Spain)
