= Canto (Carminho album) =

Studio album by Carminho
- Released: November 3, 2014
- Genre: Fado
- Length: 46:09
- Label: Warner Music Portugal

Carminho chronology
Alma (2012)	Canto (2014)	Carminho canta Tom Jobim (2016)

Canto is the third album by fado singer Carminho. It was released in 2014 by Warner Music Portugal. The album peaked at No. 1 on the Associação Fonográfica Portuguesa chart and was certified as a platinum album.

== Track listing ==
1. A ponte [3:05]
2. Saia Rodada [3:38]
3. Ventura [3:16]
4. Porquê [2:19]
5. Chuva no mar [3:24]
6. Contra a maré [2:50]
7. Andorinha [2:29]
8. O sol, eu e tu [3:32]
9. Na ribeira deste rio [3:29]
10. Espera [2:51]
11. Vou-te contar [4:03]
12. Destino [2:46]
13. Vem [3:35]
14. A Canção [4:52]

Bonus tracks

1. Ventura (Versão Jaques Morelenbaum Solo)
2. Carvoeiro
3. História Linda (De Carlos Paião)
