= Mientras no cueste trabajo =

Studio album by Melendi
- Released: 2006
- Recorded: 1995
- Genre: Pop
- Label: Carlito Records

Melendi chronology
Que el cielo espere sentao	Mientras no cueste trabajo	Curiosa la cara de tu padre

Mientras no cueste trabajo (in English: While No Trouble) is Asturian pop singer Melendi's third studio album.

The disc includes the song Arriba Extremoduro, which was an homage that Extremaduran group, and though it isn't a remake, it does sample the song La vereda de la puerta de atrás.

In 2007, it was rereleased with four new songs: Firmes, El rey de la baraja, La aceituna and Me gusta el fútbol.

== Track listing ==
1. Kisiera Yo Saber
2. Por amarte tanto
3. Calle la pantomima
4. Mientras no cueste trabajo
5. Quiero ser feliz
6. Andadas
7. Volantes pa la falda mi gitana
8. Mesías de Vallecas
9. Porque tú no eres un coche
10. Loco
11. Echarte a suertes
12. Arriba Extremoduro
13. El tiempo que gasto
14. De bar en peor
15. Zoociedad
16. Gangs of London
