= Rasel (singer) =

Spanish singer and composer

Rafael Abad Anselmo (born December 23, 1968, in Tomares, Spain), better known by his stage name Rasel, is a Spanish singer and songwriter based in California. His music incorporates various influences, including soul, R&B, dance music, and comedy.

== Career ==
Rasel debuted in 2007 with the single"Publicidad engañosa." He is known for his songwriting, often described as poetic and emotional.

His breakthrough came in 2012 with the single "Me pones tierno," a collaboration with Carlos Baute. The song became a commercial success, peaking at #6 on the Spanish Singles Chart.

Throughout his career, Rasel has been signed to several record labels, including a four-year contract with 604 Records and previous affiliations with Sony Records. He is currently signed to Warner Music.

== Discography ==
=== Studios albums ===
Title	Details
Magnético	Released: 19 March 2013; Label: Warner Music; Format: CD, digital download, Streaming

=== Singles ===
Year	Title	Peak chart positions	Album
Year	Title	SPA	Album
2011	"Let's Dance, vamos a bailar" (feat. Baby Noel)	—	Magnético
2012	"Me pones tierno" (feat. Baute)	6	Magnético
2013	"Viven" (feat. Jadel)	26	Magnético

Featured in

Year	Title	Peak chart positions	Album
Year	Title	SPA	Album
2012	"Cuestión de Príoridades por el Cuerno de África" (Melendi feat. Dani Martín, Pablo Alborán, La Dama, Rasel, Malu & Carlos Baute)	36	Non-album single
