= Cuestión de Prioridades por el Cuerno de África =

2012 single by Melendi

Single by Melendi featuring Dani Martín, Pablo Alborán, La Dama, Rasel, Malú and Carlos Baute
- Released: 20 January 2012
- Genre: Latin music
- Length: 4:23
- Label: Warner Music Spain
- Songwriter(s): Ramón Melendi

Pablo Alborán singles chronology
"Perdóname" (2011)	"Cuestión de Prioridades por el Cuerno de África" (2012)	"Te He Echado de Menos" (2012)

"Cuestión de Prioridades por el Cuerno de África" is a charity single recorded by Melendi featuring Dani Martín, Pablo Alborán, La Dama, Rasel, Malú and Carlos Baute.

In 2011, some 13 million people were suffering the effects of famine on the Horn of Africa. Melinda wanted to help and sought assistance from a number of other artists to record a song with proceeds of the song going towards helping the children of Africa in collaboration with The Save the Children Fund.

The single was released in Spain on 20 January 2012 as a digital download and peaked at number 36.

== Track listing ==
Digital download
No.	Title	Length
1.	"Cuestión de Prioridades por el Cuerno de África"	4:23

== Chart performance ==
Chart (2012)	Peak position
Spain (PROMUSICAE)	36

== Release history ==
Region	Date	Format	Label
Spain	20 January 2012	Digital download	Warner Music Spain
