= Curiosa la cara de tu padre =

Studio album by Melendi
- Released: September 16, 2008
- Genre: Pop
- Label: EMI
- Producer: José de Castro

Melendi chronology
| Mientras no cueste trabajo (2006) | Curiosa la cara de tu padre (2008) | Volvamos a empezar (2010) |

Singles from Curiosa la cara de tu padre
- 1. "Un violinista en tu tejado" Released: September 13, 2008; 2. "Como una vela" Released: January 3, 2009; 3. "Piratas del bar Caribe" Released: March 14, 2009

Curiosa la cara de tu padre (in English: Your father’s face was curious) is the fourth studio album by Asturian pop singer Melendi, produced by José de Castro. It was released September 16, 2008, and its first single was "Un violinista en tu tejado".

== Credits ==
- Eva Durán, Loli Abadía, José Losada, Josete & La Dama: backup singers.
- Enzo Filippone, Manu Rey & Angie Bao: drums.
- Luis Dulzaides & Ramón "The Lion" González: percussion.
- José de Castro: electric and acoustic guitar.
- José Luis Ordóñez and José Losada: Spanish guitar.
- José Vera: bass.

== Track listing ==
1. Como una vela
2. Un violinista en tu tejado
3. Un tipo diferente
4. Piratas del bar Caribe
5. Déjame vivir
6. Mis alas son tus hojas
7. Maldita vida loca
8. En ocasiones veo muertos (remix of the original song, written in 2003, and played live)
9. Qué más puede salir mal
10. Las cosas del amor
11. Curiosa la cara de tu padre
12. Los premios Pinocho
13. La mi mozuca (hidden track)
14. Historia de dos
15. Vampiresa
