= Sin noticias de Holanda =

- Original release cover

Studio album by Melendi
- Released: July 3, 2003
- Recorded: 2002–2003
- Genre: Flamenco, pop
- Length: 58:00
- Label: Warner Music Spain

Melendi chronology
Sin noticias de Holanda (2003)	Que el cielo espere sentao (2008)

Singles from Sin noticias de Holanda
- 1. "Mi rumbita pa tus pies" 2. "Desde mi ventana" 3. "Sé lo que hicisteis" 4. "Con la luna llena" 5. "Hablando en plata"

Sin noticias de Holanda (in English: No News From Holland) is the debut studio album from Spanish flamenco and pop singer Melendi. It was released by Warner Music Spain on July 3, 2003.

Five singles were released to promote the album. "Mi rumbita pa tus pies", "Desde mi ventana", "Sé lo que hicisteis", "Con la luna llena" and "Hablando en plata". All of them supported by music videos. Two of them, "Sé lo que hicisteis" and "Con la luna llena" received heavy airplay success in Spain.

== Track listing ==
1. "Mi rumbita pa tus pies"
2. "Desde mi ventana"
3. "Sé lo que hicisteis"
4. "Sin noticias de Holanda"
5. "Un recuerdo que olvidar"
6. "Con la luna llena"
7. "Hablando en plata"
8. "El informe del forense"
9. "Vuelvo a traficar"
10. "Una historia de tantas"
11. "Contando primaveras"
12. "Asturias" (Reissue)
13. "Moratalá" (Reissue)
14. "Trae pa´ k esa yerba güena"(Reissue)
