= Carminho canta Tom Jobim =

Studio album by Carminho
- Released: December 2, 2016
- Studio: Estúdio Biscoito Fino
- Genre: Fado, bossa nova
- Label: Warner Music Portugal
- Producer: Carminho, Paulo Jobim

Carminho chronology
| Canto (2014) | Carminho canta Tom Jobim (2016) | Maria (2018) |

Carminho canta Tom Jobim is the fourth album by fado singer Carminho. The album consists of Carminho singing compositions by Tom Jobim with backing from Jobim's band. It was released in 2016 by Warner Music Portugal. The album peaked at No. 1 on the Associação Fonográfica Portuguesa chart and was certified as a platinum album. The album features Brazilian guest singers Marisa Monte and Chico Buarque.

== Musical accompaniment ==
- Paulo Jobim - acoustic guitar (violão)
- Paulo Braga - drums (bateria)
- Daniel Jobim - piano
- Jaques Morelenbaum - violoncello

== Track listing ==
1. "A felicidade" (Tom Jobim, Vinicius de Moraes)
2. "O Que Tinha De Ser" (Tom Jobim, Vinicius de Moraes)
3. "Estrada Do Sol", featuring Marisa Monte (Tom Jobim, Dolores Duran)
4. "Meditação" (Tom Jobim, Newton Mendonça)
5. "Luiza" (Tom Jobim, Vinicius de Moraes)
6. "Falando De Amor", featuring Chico Buarque (Tom Jobim)
7. "Wave" (Tom Jobim)
8. "Sabiá", featuring Fernanda Montenegro (Tom Jobim, Chico Buarque)
9. "O Grande Amor" (Tom Jobim, Vinicius de Moraes)
10. "Retrato em Branco e Preto" (Tom Jobim, Chico Buarque)
11. "Inútil Paisagem" (Aloísio de Oliveira, Tom Jobim)
12. "Triste" (Tom Jobim)
13. "Modinha", featuring Maria Bethânia (Tom Jobim, Vinicius De Moraes)
14. "Don't Ever Go Away" (Tom Jobim, Dolores Duran, Ray Gilbert)
