= Carlos Baute =

Venezuelan singer-songwriter and TV host

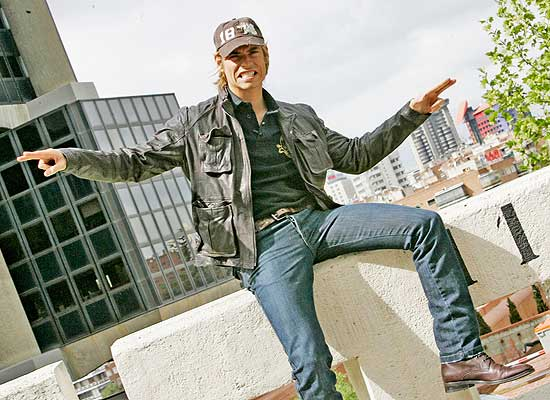
- Born: Carlos Roberto Baute Jiménez; March 8, 1974 (age 52); Caracas, Venezuela
- Occupations: Singer-songwriter, television host, actor
- Spouse: Astrid Klisans
- Musical career
- Genre: Latin pop
- Years active: 1987–present
- Label: Warner Music Spain
- Website: http://www.carlosbaute.com/

Carlos Roberto Baute Jiménez (born March 8, 1974, in Caracas, Venezuela), best known simply as Carlos Baute, is a Venezuelan singer-songwriter and television host. His music is mostly in the Latin pop genre, with some ballads and Bachata.

== Early life ==
He is the youngest son of Alfonso Baute and Clara Jiménez. His father was born in Tenerife, Spain, and his mom was born in Venezuela, both with a long family tail of Spanish origins. Baute's surname is of Guanche origin, the indigenous Berber peoples of the Canary Islands in Spain.

== Career ==
In 1987 At age 13, he joined Los Chamos, which released an album entitled Con un poco de Amor in 1990. He worked as a model and released his first solo album titled Orígenes I in 1994. He acted in the Venezuelan telenovela, Destino de Mujer (1997), as Pedro José, a swimming instructor.

With the album Yo nací para querer... (1999), he moved to Spain and had much success with all his albums. He acted in the television series ¡Ala... Dina! (TVE), Mis Adorables Vecinos (Antena 3) and was the host of Gala Miss España, Gala IB3, and Gala Fin de Año de TVE1.

Baute has released six albums, including a greatest hits album. On April 1, 2008, he released De Mi Puño y Letra, which included "Colgando en tus manos". He released two versions, one solo and one with Marta Sánchez. The duet rose to the top of the charts in many Spanish-speaking countries worldwide.

Although well known in many Hispanic countries, he has not crossed over into many other markets.

In October 2012, he released a duet with Laura Pausini, "Las cosas que no me espero".

He lives in Spain since the late 90s and has Spanish citizenship.

By March 2014, during the Venezuelan riots, he released a music video asking for "Respect" amongst citizens of different political sides. In the video "Que tu voz sea mi voz", Baute appears with the national flag painted on his face.

== Personal life ==
By June 2012 Carlos Baute married the Venezuelan model Astrid Klisans.

During the Venezuelan presidential crisis, Baute stated his position of support for Juan Guaidó, saying he has not visited Venezuela for eight years after being blacklisted by the Maduro government.

Baute lives in Madrid, Spain with his wife and three children.

== Discography ==
=== Albums ===
Year	Title	Peak chart positions	Certifications
Year	Title	SPA	Certifications
1994	Orígenes	—	
1997	Orígenes II: Tambores	—	
1999	Yo Nací para Querer	—	PROMUSICAE: Platinum
2001	Dame de Eso	—	PROMUSICAE: Platinum
2004	Peligroso	—	
2005	Baute	11	
2006	Grandes Éxitos (compilation)	16	
2008	De Mi Puño y Letra	2	PROMUSICAE: Platinum; AMPROFON: Gold
2009	Directo En Tus Manos (live)	6	
2010	Amarte Bien	3	
2013	En el Buzón de tu Corazón	8	
2019	De Amor y Dolor	8	

=== Singles ===
Year	Title	Peak chart positions	Album			
Year	Title	SPA	Album			
2008	"Colgando en tus manos" (featuring Marta Sánchez)	1	De Mi Puño y Letra			
2009	"Tu No Sabes que Tanto"	—	De Mi Puño y Letra			
2009	"Nada se compara a ti" (featuring Franco de Vita)	17	De Mi Puño y Letra			
2010	"Quien te quiere como yo"	2	Amarte Bien			
2011	"Amarte bien"	18	Amarte Bien			
2011	"Tu Cuerpo Bailando en mi Cuerpo"	—	Amarte Bien			
2016	"Amor & dolor" (featuring Alexis & Fido)	14	—N/a			
2016	"Ando buscando" (featuring PISO 21) | 14	—N/a	—N/a	2018 - 2019	"Quién es ese" (featuring Maite Perroni)Juhn All Star)	21

Featured in

Year	Title	Peak chart positions	Album
Year	Title	SPA	Album
2012	"Cuestión de Príoridades por el Cuerno de África" (Melendi feat. Dani Martín, Pablo Alborán, La Dama, Rasel, Malu & Carlos Baute)	36	N/A
2012	"Me pones tierno" (Rasel feat. Baute)	6	N/A
2012	"Las cosas que no me espero" (Laura Pausini duet with Carlos Baute)	41	Inedito
