= Alma (Carminho album) =

Studio album by Carminho
- Released: March 2, 2012
- Genre: Fado, World music
- Length: 48:30
- Label: EMI Music

Carminho chronology
Fado (2009)	''Alma'' (2012)	Canto (2014)

Alma is the second album released by Portuguese fado singer Carminho. It was released on 2 March 2012. The album features three classical fados, from the repertoires of Amália Rodrigues (Cabeça de Vento), Maria Amélia Proença (À Beira do Cais) and Fernanda Maria (As Pedras da Minha Rua), three originals, including Bom Dia, Amor, from a letter by Fernando Pessoa, and two versions of traditional fados, with new lyrics, including Folha, written by Carminho herself. The album includes two versions of songs of great names of the Brazilian Popular Music, Meu Namorado, by Chico Buarque, and Saudades do Brasil em Portugal, by Vinicius de Moraes.

The album was released to highly critical and commercial success, reaching Platinum status. The first single chosen was "As Pedras da Minha Rua", with an innovative video directed by Enrique Escamilla. The special edition included two more songs. The second single was "Bom Dia, Amor (Carta de Maria José)", with lyrics inspired by a letter of Fernando Pessoa.

== Track listing ==
1. "Lágrimas do Céu" (Fado Cravo) (lyrics, Carlos Conde, music, Alfredo Marceneiro)
2. "Malva-Rosa" (lyrics, João Linhares Barbosa, music, José Inácio)
3. "As Pedras da Minha Rua" (lyrics, Eduardo Damas, music, Manuel Paião)
4. "Bom Dia, Amor (Carta de Maria José)" (lyrics and music, Diogo Valente)
5. "Folha" (Fado Proença) (lyrics, Carminho, music, Júlio Proença)
6. "Meu Namorado" (lyrics, Chico Buarque, music, Edu Lobo)
7. "Fado das Queixas" (lyrics, Joaquim Frederico de Brito, music, Carlos Rocha)
8. "Fado Adeus" (lyrics and music, Vitorino)
9. "Cabeça de Vento" (Bolero do Machado) (lyrics, João Linhares Barbosa, music, Armando Machado)
10. "Impressão Digital" (Fado Helena) (lyrics, António Gedeão, music, Miguel Ramos)
11. "Talvez" (lyrics, Vasco Graça Moura, music, Mário Pacheco)
12. "À Beira do Cais" (lyrics, António José, music, Manuel Viegas)
13. "Ruas" (lyrics, Diogo Clemente, music, Joaquim Frederico de Brito)
14. "Saudades do Brasil em Portugal" (lyrics and music, Vinicius de Moraes)
15. "Disse-te Adeus" (Marcha do Raul Pinho) (lyrics, Manuela de Freitas, music, Raul Pinho)
16. "Poema Original" (Fado Carmo) (lyrics, Diogo Valente, music, traditional) (Special edition)
17. "Praia Nua" (Fado Lenitivo) (lyrics, António Calém, music, Helena Moreira Viana) (Special edition)
