= Peligroso (Carlos Baute album) =

Studio album by Carlos Baute
- Released: November 9, 2004
- Genre: Latin pop
- Length: 43:30
- Label: Warner Music
- Producer: Humberto Gatica

Carlos Baute chronology
Dame De Eso (2001)	Peligroso (2004)	Baute (2005)

Peligroso is a studio album released by Venezuelan singer-songwriter Carlos Baute through Warner Music on November 9, 2004. The album was recorded in Los Angeles, California, and produced by Humberto Gatica.

== Track listing ==
All tracks are written by Carlos Baute

No.	Title	Length
1.	"Rosa Me Roza"	3:45
2.	"Lo Que Tu Quieres Yo Quiero"	3:26
3.	"Me Enseñaste"	3:58
4.	"Chiki Chiki"	3:55
5.	"Peligroso"	3:52
6.	"Que Te Vaya Bien"	3:58
7.	"Umjuu...Lo Haria Por Ti"	3:47
8.	"Lloraras"	4:36
9.	"He Sido Un Falso"	4:07
10.	"Urgentemente"	3:36
11.	"Tan Vacio"	4:28

== Release history ==
Country	Date	Format(s)	Label
United States	November 9, 2004	Digital download	Warner Music Group
Mexico	November 9, 2004	Digital download	Warner Music Group
United Kingdom	November 9, 2004	Digital download	Warner Music Group
Spain	November 9, 2004	Digital download	Warner Music Group
Italy	November 9, 2004	Digital download	Warner Music Group
France	November 9, 2004	Digital download	Warner Music Group
Brazil	November 9, 2004	Digital download	Warner Music Group
Canada	November 9, 2004	Digital download	Warner Music Group
United States	August 28, 2007	CD	Warner Music Group
