= Colgando en tus manos =

"Colgando en Tus Manos"

Single by Carlos Baute featuring Marta Sánchez

from the album De Mi Puño y Letra
- Released: October 13, 2008
- Recorded: 2007–2008
- Studio: Cosmos Studios; Elith Studios (Mexico City; De Vita Studios; Red Led (Madrid)
- Genre: Latin pop
- Length: 3:51
- Label: Warner Music Spain
- Songwriter: Carlos Baute
- Producers: Armando Ávila; Juan Carlos Moguel; Carlos Baute

Carlos Baute featuring Marta Sánchez singles chronology
"Tú No Sabes Que Tanto" (2008)	"Colgando en Tus Manos" (2008)	"Nada Se Compara a Tí" (2009)

"Colgando en Tus Manos" (Hanging on Your Hands) is a Latin pop song written, produced and performed by Venezuelan pop singer-songwriter Carlos Baute and featuring Spanish singer Marta Sánchez released on October 13, 2008 as the first single off his seventh studio album De Mi Puño y Letra (2008). The original version of the song (sung only by Baute) belonged to the official release of the album, and the official single version (including vocals from Sanchez) to the re-edition released six months after.

Considered as the breakthrough and now signature song of Baute, the song has become his most successful song ever, and also the most successful song for Marta Sánchez.

== Release and chart performance ==
The original version of the song was never released. Instead, the second version, featuring Marta Sánchez, has been available for download through iTunes since November 2008. The song immediately received airplay, mainly in the country of Spain, where it began 2009 at #1 and stayed at the top for a total 29 weeks, setting the record for the most weeks at #1 in Spain. The song sold over 400,000 copies in Spain.

In the United States, the song began charting at the end of 2009, being the last Latin market in which the song charted. As of February 13, 2010 the song has performed very well, reaching number one on the Billboard Latin Pop Songs and number four on the Billboard Top Latin Songs. "Colgando en Tus Manos" is one of few Latin songs to chart in three different years, charting in 2008 mainly in Spain and Venezuela, in 2009 and 2010 in all other Latin markets, and in 2010 in the U.S.

== Music video ==
The music video of "Colgando en Tus Manos" is a classic ambient piece. Filmed in Bulgaria, it shows Baute and Sanchez in various stages throughout the city walking, traveling on an old-model car, and even dancing on a theatre stage at the end. The video was universally acclaimed by critics and fans, naming it "the most impressive video of Carlos Baute".

On the internet, the video enjoyed massive success on YouTube, with more than 918 million views since its release on the website (as of June 2021).

== Charts ==
=== Weekly charts ===
Weekly chart performance for "Colgando En Tus Manos"
Chart (2008–2010)	Peak position
Mexico (Monitor Latino)	2
Spain (Promusicae)	1
US Hot Latin Songs (Billboard)	4
US Latin Pop Airplay (Billboard)	1
US Tropical Airplay (Billboard)	17

=== Year-end charts ===
Chart (2009)	Position
Spain Top 50	1
Spain Top 20 Radio	2

Chart (2010)	Position
US Hot Latin Songs (Billboard)	21

=== Certifications and sales ===
Region	Certification	Certified units/sales
Mexico Digital downloads	—	50,000
Spain (Promusicae)	10× Platinum	250,000^{*}
Spain (Promusicae) Ringtone	Platinum	20,000^{*}
^{*} Sales figures based on certification alone.
