= Que el cielo espere sentao =

Studio album by Melendi
- Released: 2005
- Genre: Pop
- Label: Carlito Records

Melendi chronology
Sin noticias de Holanda	Que el cielo espere sentao	Mientras no cueste trabajo

Que el cielo espere sentao (in English: Let Heaven await Sitting) is Spanish pop singer Melendi's second album. It sold more than 200,000 copies, and was later rereleased with three new songs.

== Track listing ==
1. Caminando por la vida
2. Billy el pistolero
3. Como dijo el rey
4. Con tanto héroe
5. Novia a la fuga
6. Con sólo una sonrisa
7. Hasta que la muerte los separe
8. Como se bailan los tangos
9. Cuestión de prioridades
10. Con tu amor es suficiente
11. Cannabis
12. Que el cielo espere sentao
13. El Nano (Bonus Track Reissue)
14. La dama y el vagabundo (Bonus Track Reissue)
15. Carlota (Bonus Track Reissue)
