= Miedo (song) =

Single by Pablo Alborán

from the album Pablo Alborán
- Released: 13 May 2011
- Recorded: 2010–11
- Genre: Bulería-celta
- Length: 3:44
- Label: EMI Music
- Songwriter(s): Pablo Alborán
- Producer(s): Manuel Illán

Ruth Lorenzo singles chronology
"Solamente Tú" (2011)	"Miedo" (2011)	"Perdóname" (2011)

"Miedo" (meaning Fear) is a single by Latin Grammy nominated Spanish singer Pablo Alborán, from his self-titled debut album. It was released on 13 May 2011 as a digital download in Spain. The song peaked at number 50 on the Spanish Singles Chart. The song was written by Pablo Alborán and produced by Manuel Illán.

== Music video ==
A music video to accompany the release of "Miedo" was first released onto YouTube on 26 May 2011 at a total length of four minutes and seven seconds.

== Track listing ==
Digital download
No.	Title	Length
1.	"Miedo"	3:44

== Chart performance ==
Chart (2011)	Peak position
Spain (PROMUSICAE)	40

== Release history ==
Region	Date	Format	Label
Spain	13 May 2011	Digital download	EMI Music
