= De Mi Puño y Letra =

Studio album by Carlos Baute
- Released: April 1, 2008
- Recorded: 2007–2008
- Studio: Cosmos Studios; Elith Studios (Mexico City, Mexico); De Vita Studios; Red Led (Madrid, Spain)
- Genre: Latin pop
- Length: 40:44
- Label: Warner Music Spain
- Producer: Armando Ávila · Juan Carlos Moguel · Carlos Baute

Carlos Baute chronology
Baute (2005)	De Mi Puño y Letra (2008)	Directo En Tus Manos (2009)

Deluxe Edition cover

Singles from De Mi Puño y Letra
- 1. "Colgando en tus manos" Released: October 13, 2008; 2. "Tu No Sabes Que Tanto" Released: February 9, 2009; 3. "Nada Se Compara A Ti" Released: June 1, 2009

De Mi Puño y Letra is a studio album recorded by Venezuelan singer-songwriter Carlos Baute. The album was released by Warner Music Spain on April 1, 2008 and re-released on June 30, 2009. It was recorded between Mexico City and Los Angeles and produced by Juan Carlos Moguel and Armándo Ávila, who has also worked with RBD and La Quinta Estación.

It features Venezuelan musician and multi-instrumentalist Franco de Vita on the song "Nada Se Compara A Ti". It is the first time Baute had collaborated with the artist, who had a very successful career on the mid-1990s and is also known as the author of hits like Ricky Martin's "Vuelve" and Chayanne's "Contra Vientos y Mareas". On the deluxe edition, Spanish singer Marta Sanchez is featured on a new version "Colgando En Tus Manos".

Three singles were released from the album. The first single, "Colgando En Tus Manos" became a worldwide hit, mainly its re-release featuring Marta Sanchez. Second single "Tu No Sabes Que Tanto" became a moderate hit in most Latin markets. Third single, "Nada Se Compara A Ti" became a hit in Latin airplay charts, but failed to chart in the United States.

De Mi Puño y Letra became a commercial success for Baute. It reached No.11 on the Billboard Latin Pop Albums chart, his highest entry to date. On Spain, the album reached No.2 and received a Platinum certification for 60,000 copies sold. It also reached No.22 on Mexico and received a Gold certification for 40,000 copies sold.

== Singles ==
Three singles were released from the album. The first single, "Colgando En Tus Manos" was first released in August 2008 as the solo version included in the album. The song was later re-released as a new version featuring Marta Sanchez, and became a huge commercial hit, topping the charts on many Latin American countries. In Spain, it reached No.1 for 27 weeks, and in the United States, it reached No.4 on the Billboard Latin Songs chart, and No.1 on the Latin Pop Songs component chart. It ultimately became the biggest hit in Baute's career.

The second single, "Tu No Sabes Que Tanto", reached No. 28 on the Latin Songs chart. It also reached No.17 on the Latin Pop Songs component chart. "Nada Se Compara a Ti", featuring Franco de Vita, reached No.29 on the Spanish Singles Chart. It failed to chart on the United States.

== Track listing ==
- Standard Edition

No.	Title	Length
1.	"Colgando en Tus Manos"	3:51
2.	"No Me Abandones Amiga Mia"	3:49
3.	"En Nuestro Aniversario"	3:15
4.	"Lloran Mis Labios"	3:33
5.	"Tú No Sabes Que Tanto"	3:29
6.	"Donde Está El Amor Que No Duele"	3:27
7.	"Nada Se Compara a Tí" (featuring Franco de Vita)	3:47
8.	"Te Extraño Porque Te Extraño"	3:30
9.	"Me Quiero Casar Contigo"	3:49
10.	"Mariana No Quiere Ser Mojigata"	4:31
11.	"Qué Facil Es Decirte Que Te Quiero"	3:41
12.	"Llevas en Tus Genes la Mentira"	3:24
13.	"Nada Se Compara a Tí"	3:51

Deluxe Edition
No.	Title	Length
1.	"Colgando en Tus Manos" (featuring Marta Sánchez)	3:53
2.	"No Me Abandones Amiga Mía"	3:49
3.	"En Nuestro Aniversario"	3:15
4.	"Lloran Mis Labios"	3:33
5.	"Tú No Sabes Que Tanto"	3:29
6.	"Donde Está El Amor Que No Duele"	3:27
7.	"Nada Se Compara a Tí" (featuring Franco de Vita)	3:47
8.	"Te Extraño Porque Te Extraño"	3:30
9.	"Me Quiero Casar Contigo"	3:49
10.	"Mariana No Quiere Ser Mojigata"	4:31
11.	"Que Facil Es Decirte Que Te Quiero"	3:41
12.	"Colgando en Tus Manos"	3:51
13.	"Mentiras Son Mentiras"	3:24
14.	"Nada Se Compara a Tí"	3:48
15.	"Colgando en Tus Manos" (Remix)	5:17
16.	"Tu No Sabes Que Tanto" (Remix)	5:03

== Personnel ==
- Miguel Alonso Alcántara – viola
- Laura Álvarez – violin
- Consuelo Aquino – violin
- Enriqueta Arrellanes – violin
- Armando Ávila – mixing
- Javier Barrera – drums
- Carlos Baute – arrangements, composer, chorus
- Hugo Boss – wardrobe
- Luis Bustamante – arrangements, chorus
- Francisco Cedillo – viola
- Karina Cortez – violin
- Tom Coyne – mastering
- Franco De Vita – chorus
- Marta Sánchez – chorus
- Celio González – cencerro, conga, laudes, timbales, udu
- Alan Lerma – violin
- Gloria López – violin
- Humberto Lopez – violin
- Rafael López – violin
- Juan Carlos Moguel – arrangements, chorus, Hammond B3, mellotron, piano, producer, remixing
- Ricardo "Lemoc" Morales – chorus
- John Paterno – mixing
- Erika Ramírez – viola
- Judith Reyes – viola
- Franklin Rivero – chorus, management
- Stephany Ruis – chorus
- Erick E. Sanchez – violin
- Guillermo "Willy" Trejo – tres cubano
- Guillermo Uribe – violin
- Karlos Valdes – arrangements, chorus

Source: Allmusic

== Chart performance ==
De Mi Puño y Letra became a commercial success for Baute. It reached No.11 on the Billboard Latin Pop Albums chart, his highest entry to date. On Spain, the album reached No.2 and received a Platinum certification for 60,000 copies sold. It also reached No.8 on Mexico and received a Gold certification for 40,000 copies sold.

=== Weekly charts ===
Chart (2009/2010)	Peak position
Spanish Albums Chart	2
Mexican Albums Chart	8
US Top Latin Albums (Billboard)	36
US Latin Pop Albums (Billboard)	11

=== Yearly charts ===
Chart (2009–10)	Peak position
Spanish Album Charts	11
Mexican Album Charts	82
US Top Latin Albums (Billboard)	36
US Latin Pop Albums (Billboard)	11

=== Certifications ===
Country	Certification
Spain (PROMUSICAE)	Platinum
Mexico (AMPROFON)	Gold

== Release history ==
Country	Date	Format(s)	Label	Edition(s)
United States	April 1, 2008	Digital download	Warner Music Spain	Standard Edition
Canada	April 1, 2008	Digital download	Warner Music Spain	Standard Edition
Mexico	April 1, 2008	Digital download	Warner Music Spain	Standard Edition
Spain	April 1, 2008	Digital download	Warner Music Spain	Standard Edition
United States	June 30, 2009	Digital download	Warner Music Spain	Deluxe Edition
Canada	June 30, 2009	Digital download	Warner Music Spain	Deluxe Edition
United Kingdom	June 30, 2009	Digital download	Warner Music Spain	Deluxe Edition
Germany	June 30, 2009	Digital download	Warner Music Spain	Deluxe Edition
Italy	June 30, 2009	Digital download	Warner Music Spain	Deluxe Edition
France	June 30, 2009	Digital download	Warner Music Spain	Deluxe Edition
Mexico	June 30, 2009	Digital download	Warner Music Spain	Deluxe Edition
Spain	June 30, 2009	Digital download	Warner Music Spain	Deluxe Edition
Brazil	June 30, 2009	Digital download	Warner Music Spain	Deluxe Edition
Venezuela	June 30, 2009	Digital download	Warner Music Spain	Deluxe Edition
Argentina	June 30, 2009	Digital download	Warner Music Spain	Deluxe Edition
Chile	June 30, 2009	Digital download	Warner Music Spain	Deluxe Edition
Colombia	June 30, 2009	Digital download	Warner Music Spain	Deluxe Edition
