= Solamente Tú (song) =

Single by Pablo Alborán

from the album Pablo Alborán
- Released: 14 September 2010
- Recorded: 2010
- Genre: Flamenco-pop
- Length: 4:08
- Label: EMI Music
- Songwriter: Pablo Alborán
- Producer: Manuel Illán

Pablo Alborán singles chronology
"Solamente Tú" (2010)	"Miedo" (2011)

"Solamente Tú" ("Only You") is the debut single by Spanish singer Pablo Alborán, from his self-titled debut album. It was released on 14 September 2010 as a digital download in Spain. The song peaked at number 1 on the Spanish Singles Chart. The song was written by Pablo Alborán and produced by Manuel Illán.

== Music video ==
A music video to accompany the release of "Solamente Tú" was first released onto YouTube on September 21, 2010, at a total length of four minutes and eighteen seconds.

== Live performances ==
At the 12th Annual Latin Grammy Awards in a mash-up along Paula Fernandes and Romeo, Sie7e and Taboo, and Alborán in a duet with Demi Lovato who was doing vocals in Spanish.

== Track listing ==
Digital download
No.	Title	Length
1.	"Solamente Tú"	4:08

== Chart performance ==
=== Weekly charts ===
Chart (2010/11)	Peak position
Spain (PROMUSICAE)	1
US Hot Latin Songs (Billboard)	35
US Latin Pop Airplay (Billboard)	13

=== Year-end charts ===
End Of Year (2011)	Peak position
Spain (PROMUSICAE)	3

End Of Year (2012)	Peak position
Spain (PROMUSICAE)	29

=== Certifications ===
Region	Certification	Certified units/sales
Spain (Promusicae)	2× Platinum	80,000^{*}
^{*} Sales figures based on certification alone.

== Release history ==
Region	Date	Format	Label
Spain	September 14, 2010	Digital download	EMI Music

== Damien Sargue and Pablo Alboran version ==
In September 2014, French pop singer Damien Sargue released a French version of "Solamente Tú" titled "Solamente Tù". It was included on the album Latin Lovers. It featured Pablo Alborán.
