= Melendi =

Spanish singer (born 1979)

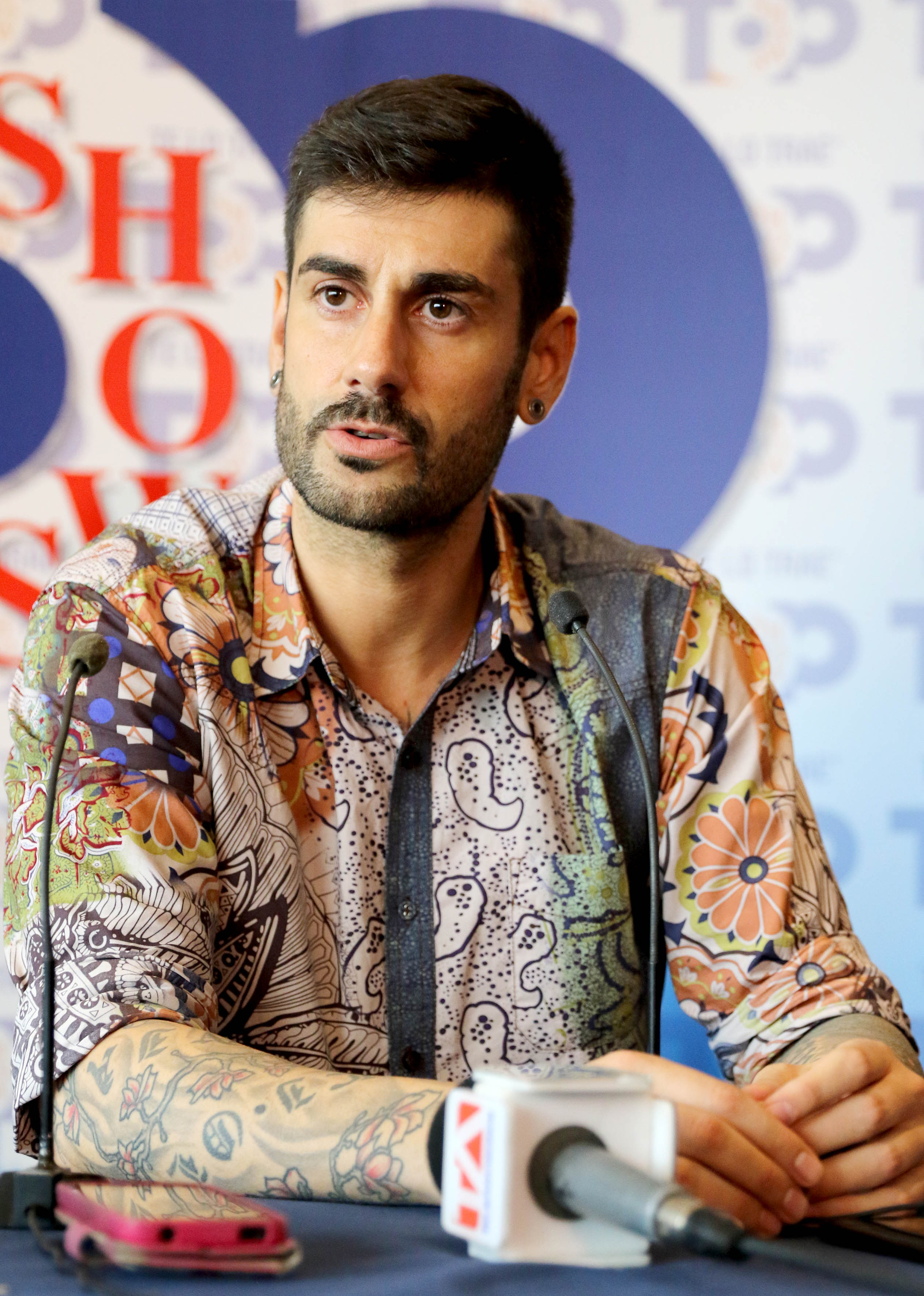
- Melendi in February 2017

Background information
- Also known as: Melendi
- Born: Ramón Melendi Espina; 21 January 1979 (age 47); Oviedo, Spain
- Genres: Pop; rumba; pop rock
- Labels: Carlito; EMI
- Website: www.melendioficial.com

Ramón Melendi Espina (born 21 January 1979), known mononymously as Melendi, is a Spanish singer-songwriter. His specialties are rock, flamenco, and rumba styles.

== Early life ==
Melendi was born in Oviedo, Asturias. He went to school with Formula One race car driver Fernando Alonso, to whom he dedicated the song "Magic Alonso". Melendi also did racing for a while. He realized very quickly that though he was not made for racing nor studying, he was good at football. He played in the lower ranks of Astur CF, at the time a reserve team for Real Oviedo. Afterwards, he worked as a waiter in several bars, living experiences that would later make up the lyrics of his songs.

In 2001, he joined a group called "El bosque de Sherwood", and soon after recorded a demo with only three songs, "Sin noticias de Holanda", "El informe del forense", and "Vuelvo a traficar".

== Career ==
=== 2003–2006: Career beginnings ===
In February 2003, Melendi released his first solo album, Sin noticias de Holanda, with twelve songs. In December 2003, this disc was rereleased with two new songs, "Asturias" and "Moratalá". However, he reached true fame when the 2004 Vuelta a España chose his song "Con la luna llena" as its official theme. In May 2004, he started a small tour around Spain, selling 50,000 copies of his CD, making it a gold album.

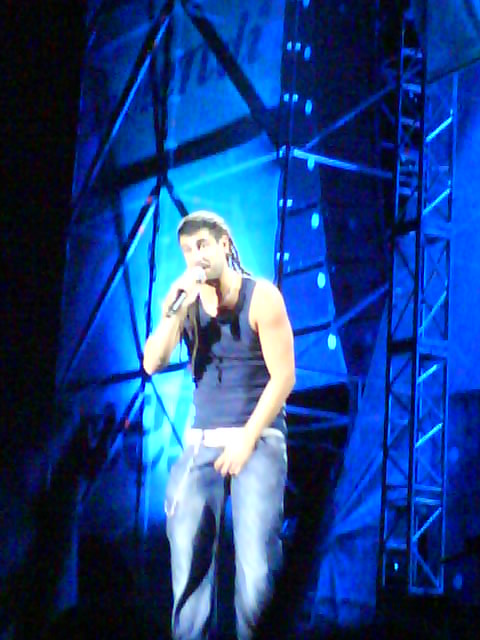
Melendi in Valladolid

In 2005, he released his second solo CD, Que el cielo espere sentao, which has sold more than 200,000 copies. Later that same year, he rereleased the album with three new songs, "El Nano", "La dama y el vagabundo" and "Carlota", and a Live concert DVD recorded in Oviedo. He also became a father that year, and received the Onda award for Best Song of the Year for "Caminando por la vida". In November 2005, he received seven Platinum Discs for his two albums. Sin noticias... received four and Que el cielo... three.

In 2006, it was announced that Melendi would be one of the main stars in the PSP game Gangs of London. Melendi played Mr. Big, an evil gangster. He also wrote the song "Gangs of London" for the occasion, going on to film a video amidst police lights and sirens. The videogame was launched on 1 August of that year in the UK and on 6 September in Spain; EMI stepped in to distribute his CDs worldwide. He also wrote the song "Volveremos" (We Shall Return) for Real Oviedo. The singer is also involved in the production of the film Vuelvo a traficar (I'm Dealing Again). Mientras no cueste trabajo was released on 13 November 2006, in two formats: a normal CD with 12 songs, and a special edition, with 16 songs and a DVD with extras. The disc was rereleased on 29 October 2009, with four new songs, "Firmes", "El rey de la baraja", "La aceituna", and "Me gusta el fútbol".

=== 2007–2010: Curiosa la cara de tu padre and Volvamos a empezar ===
In 2007, Melendi received the "Best Tour" award from the Premios de la Música ceremony held in Cordoba. He also did an advertising campaign for Canal+ Spain entitled "Me gusta el fútbol" (I Like Football), for which he wrote a song of the same name.

Also in 2007, Melendi stood trial for provoking an incident while under the influence of alcohol on a flight from Madrid to Mexico City that required the pilot to return to Madrid two hours after takeoff. He was released after testifying. Soon after, he was given the "Left Foot" award from Spanish radio station Cadena 100 for this incident.

Currently, Melendi directs his Blue Donkey Music company, helping young singers start their careers. He has offered contracts to four groups, Algunos Hombres Buenos, Rasel, La Dama y Belo, and Los Susodichos. This last group was nominated for a Latin Grammy for Best Rock Vocals. Algunos Hombres Buenos left the label in 2008.

On 9 August 2008, he presented his new single, "Un violinista en tu tejado" from his album Curiosa la cara de tu padre on Spanish radio station Los 40 Principales. The album was released on 16 September 2008. On 12 December, Los 40 Principales awarded him their award for this album.

On 17 December 2009, he released a new double CD, Aún más curiosa la cara de tu padre, including the original disc and another with nine new songs and links to exclusive content on his website.

=== 2011–2015: Lágrimas desordenadas, Un alumno más and Directo a septiembre ===
In 2011, Melendi recorded a cover of "True colours" by Cyndi Lauper in Catalan called "Ulls dolços", for the CD of TV3's telethon La Marató.

On 13 November 2012, he released a new album called Lágrimas desordenadas. He went on a tour of Spain and Latin America later that same year to celebrate the 10th anniversary of his first solo album.

His latest album, Un alumno más, was released on 25 November 2014. Over the four months before the album was released, two songs from the album were released as lyrics videos. One was released as a single ("Tocado y hundido"), and one was released in an acoustic version.

=== 2016–2018: Quítate las gafas and Ahora ===
In 2016, Melendi issued Quítate las gafas, featuring collaboration with ChocQuibTown. The first single from the album was "Desde Que Estamos Juntos", released on 23 September 2016. The other songs released were "La Casa No Es Igual", "Destino o Casualidad" and "Yo Me Veo Contigo". On 2 June 2017, he released a remix version of "Destino o Casualidad" with American duo Ha*Ash, along with the music video. On 8 December 2017, he released a second compilation album, Yo me veo contigo, with 11 songs.

=== 2019–present: 10:20:40 ===
In October 2019, Melendi joined as coach of the second Mexican season of La Voz Kids by Televisa.

On 29 November 2019, he released a new album called 10:20:40, featuring collaboration with Cali y El Dandee.

== Private life ==
From the early beginnings of his career, Melendi has been surrounded by a series of constant myths about his life. The most known myths were that he was involved with drug trafficking during his youth and that he had been in jail. There were false reports announcing his alleged death from an overdose or shootings. These myths reached such notoriety that the artist himself made fun of them in a 2004 concert in Zamora.

In November 2007, he was involved in an altercation while intoxicated on a flight from Madrid to Mexico. Because of the severity of the fight, the pilot returned to the departure point two hours after takeoff. Melendi was arrested and then released shortly after.

Melendi's first marriage with Miriam Martinez resulted in the birth of his first child, in 2005. He was then married to Damaris Abad from 2010 to 2014. In 2014, he met the Argentine actress and dancer Julia Nakamatsu, who later appeared in his music video for "La promesa." He married Nakamatsu in 2019, and they have four children together.

In 2023 Melendi revealed that his grandfather is originally from Camagüey, Cuba.

== Artistry ==
Influences

The artistic beginnings of Melendi were not academic nor formal; he does not have an official musical education, he mentions he started singing and playing guitar at the age of 16. His artistic inspirations are reflections of the artist's background, showcasing elements from the Spanish culture and folkloric genres such as flamenco and Rumba flamenca, Melendi’s biggest artistic inspirations are Joaquín Sabina, Jose Manuel Serrat, and Pablo Milanés. Melendi began his career focusing on the popular styles and rhythms of Spain in the early 2000’s such as flamenco and Pop rock widely present on his debut album “Sin noticias de Holanda”. His musical journey showcases a clear switch as the artist has transitioned from the rhythms of flamenco to more produced and refined pop-rock infused with orchestral elements. The artist himself has recognized the evolution of his music in an interview where he mentioned that it's hard for him to listen to his first albums not because he finds them bad, but because he doesn't recognize himself. He has mentioned that each album represents a specific moment in his life but especially highlights the third album on which he had his first child. The artist mentions that most of his musical references come from the music his parents used to listen to and that he enjoys listening to those artists' interviews and learning where their music comes from. Melendez calls himself a creative person rather than an artist and, as a creative person, he understands the creative process. He writes a song by doing research, asking for different opinions and then he begins the writing process.

== Discography ==
=== Albums ===
==== Studio albums ====
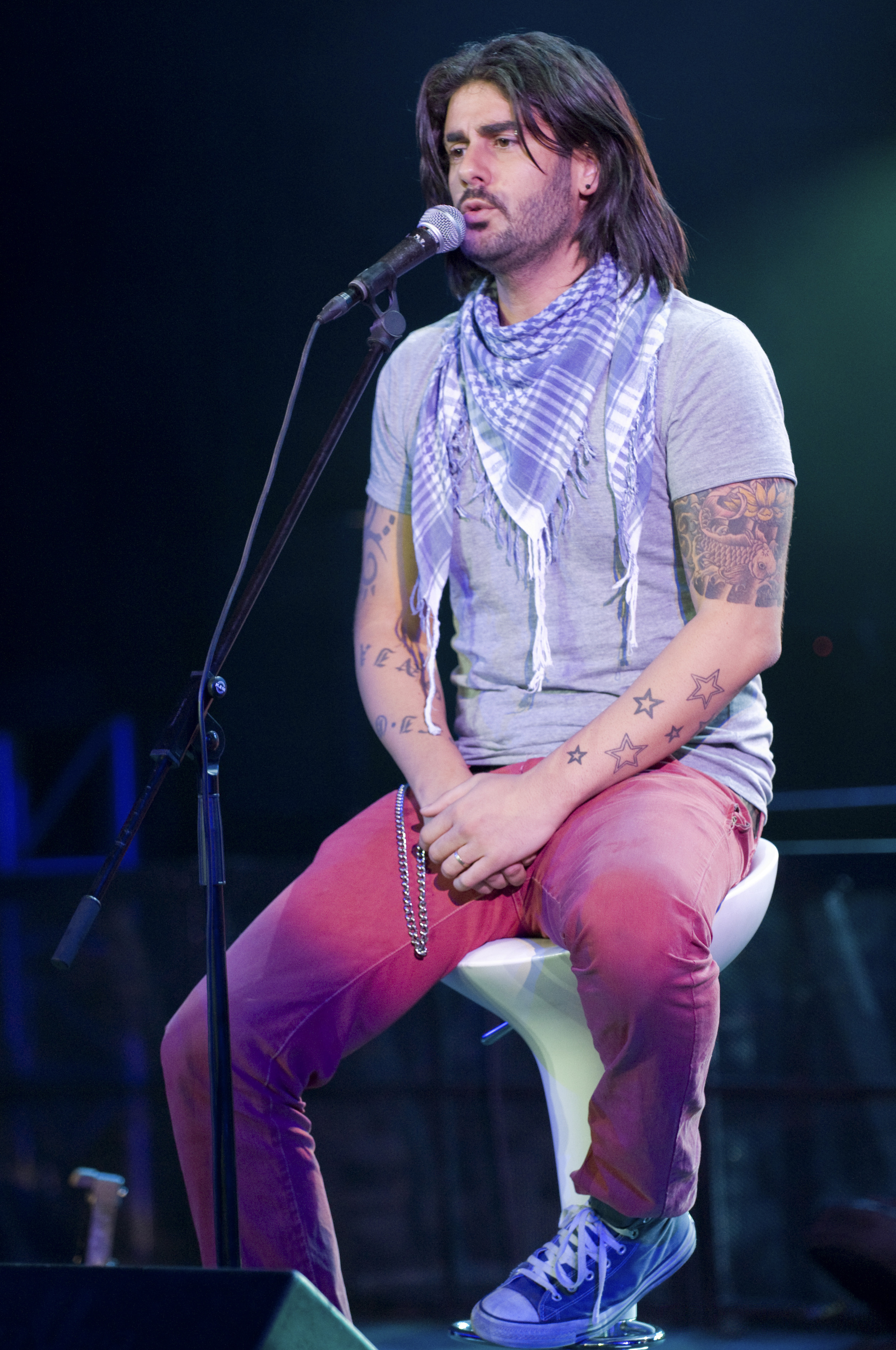
Melendi on 13 November 2008

Title	Album details	Peak position SPA	Certifications
Sin noticias de Holanda	Released: 11 February 2004; Label: Carlito Records – El Diablo	11	PROMUSICAE: 2× Platinum
Que el cielo espere sentao	Released: 25 April 2005; Label: Carlito Records – El Diablo	1	PROMUSICAE: 2× Platinum
Mientras no cueste trabajo	Released: 13 November 2006; Label: Capitol	2	PROMUSICAE: 2× Platinum
Curiosa la cara de tu padre	Released: 16 September 2008; Label: Carlito Records – EMI Music	1	PROMUSICAE: Platinum
Volvamos a empezar	Released: 2 November 2010; Label: Warner Dro	2	PROMUSICAE: Gold
Lágrimas desordenadas	Released: 13 November 2012; Label: Warner Dro	2	PROMUSICAE: 2× Platinum
Un alumno más	Released: 25 November 2014; Label: Warner Dro	1	PROMUSICAE: 2× Platinum
Directo a septiembre	Released: 4 December 2015; Label: Warner Dro	4	PROMUSICAE: Platinum
Quítate las gafas	Released: 11 November 2016; Label: Sony Music Spain	1	PROMUSICAE: 2× Platinum
Ahora	Released: 9 March 2018; Label: Sony Music Spain	1	PROMUSICAE: Platinum
10:20:40	Released: 29 November 2019; Label: Sony Music Spain	1	PROMUSICAE: Gold
Likes y Cicatrices	Released: 2 September 2021; Label: Sony Music Spain	1	PROMUSICAE: Gold
Pop Rock	Released: 1 May 2026; Label: Sony Music Spain	4	

==== Live albums ====
Title	Album details
Directo a Septiembre (Gira Un Alumno Más)	Released: 4 December 2014; Label: Sony Music Spain

==== Compilation albums ====
Title	Album details	Peak position SPA	Certifications
Caminando Por La Vida (Remastered)	Released: 22 Abril 2008; Label: Carlito Records – EMI Music	–	
Yo me veo contigo	Released: 8 December 2017; Label: Sony Music Spain	6	PROMUSICAE: Gold
20 Años Sin Noticias	Released: 3 November 2023; Label: Sony Music Spain	1	

=== Extended plays ===
Title	Album details
Aún más curiosa la cara de tu padre	Released: 17 March 2009; Label: Carlito Records – EMI Music

=== Singles ===
Year	Title	Peak position SPA	Certifications	Album
2003	"Mi Rumbita Pa Tus Pies"	—		Sin noticias de Holanda
2003	"Desde Mi Ventana"	—		Sin noticias de Holanda
2003	"Sé Lo Que Hicisteis"	—		Sin noticias de Holanda
2004	"Con La Luna Llena"	—		Sin noticias de Holanda
2004	"Hablando En Plata"	—		Sin noticias de Holanda
2005	"Caminando Por La Vida"	—		Que el cielo espere sentao
2005	"Con Sólo Una Sonrisa"	—		Que el cielo espere sentao
2006	"Novia A La Fuga"	—		Que el cielo espere sentao
2006	"Kisiera Yo Saber"	17		Mientras no cueste trabajo
2007	"Calle La Pantomima"	—		Mientras no cueste trabajo
2007	"Por Amarte Tanto"	—		Mientras no cueste trabajo
2008	"Un Violinista En Tu Tejado"	6	PROMUSICAE: 2× Platinum (Ringtone)	Curiosa la cara de tu padre
2009	"Piratas Del Bar Caribe"	33		Curiosa la cara de tu padre
2009	"Estoy Enfermo" (with Pignoise)	12	PROMUSICAE: Gold	Curiosa la cara de tu padre
2010	"Como Una Vela"	13		Aún Más Curiosa La Cara De Tu Padre
2010	"Barbie de Extrarradio"	10	PROMUSICAE: Gold	Volvamos A Empezar
2011	"Canción de Amor Caducada"	10		Volvamos A Empezar
2011	"Perdóname ángel"	22		Volvamos A Empezar
2012	"Cuestión De Príoridades Por El Cuerno De África" (with Carlos Baute)	36		Charity Single
2012	"Lágrimas Desordenadas"	3	PROMUSICAE: Gold	Lágrimas Desordenadas
2012	"Cheque Al Portamor"	36		Lágrimas Desordenadas
2013	"Tu Jardín Con Enanitos"	10		Lágrimas Desordenadas
2013	"Cheque Al Portamor"	36		Lágrimas Desordenadas
2014	"Tocado Y Hundido"	4	PROMUSICAE: Platinum	Un Alumno Más
2015	"Más Allá De Nuestros Recuerdos"	19		Un Alumno Más
2015	"La Promesa"	21		Un Alumno Más
2016	"Desde Que Estamos Juntos"	5		Quítate Las Gafas
2016	"Soy Tu Superhéroe"	28		Quítate Las Gafas
2017	"La Casa No Es Igual"	41		Quítate Las Gafas
2017	"Destino o Casualidad" (solo o with Ha*Ash)	56	PROMUSICAE: Platinum; AMPROFON: Platinum; RIAA: Gold (Latin)	Quítate Las Gafas
2018	"El Arrepentido" (with Carlos Vives)	33	PROMUSICAE: Gold	Ahora
2018	"Déjala Que Baile" (with Alejandro Sanz and Arkano)	15	PROMUSICAE: Platinum	Ahora
2018	"Mírame (Acústico)"	—		Ahora
2018	"Aves de Paso"	—		Ahora
2018	"Besos a la Lona"	88		Ahora
2019	"El cielo nunca cambiará"	—		Cómo entrenar a tu dragón 3 soundtrack
2019	"Dímelo" (with Andy Clay)	—		Non-album singles
2019	"Por encima de la bruma"	83		Non-album singles
2019	"El Ciego" (with Cali y El Dandee)	—		10:20:40
2019	"Casi"	—		10:20:40
2019	"Tan Tonto Cómo Tú"	—		10:20:40
2020	"La Chica Perfecta"	—		10:20:40
2021	"La Boca Junta"	79		Likes y Cicatrices
2022	"Si ella supiera" (with India Martínez)	53		Non-album singles
2023	"Sé Lo Que Hicisteis" (with Natos y Waor)	48		20 Años Sin Noticias
2025	"Caminando Por la Vida"	69		Non-album singles
2026	"Fecha de Caducidad"	67		

== Collaborations ==
- José Avilés Bas: "Volveremos Real Oviedo" (2013)
- Los Chunguitos: "Con la luna llena" (2004).
- Pablo Moro: "María" (2005).
- Algunos Hombres Buenos: "Salta" (2006).
- Seguridad Social: "Quiero tener tu presencia" (live, unedited).
- Belo: "Al gallo que me cante" (live, unedited).
- Un tributo a Brasil: "Adiós tristeza".
- Rasel "Mil razas" (2007).
- Guaraná: "De lao a lao" (2008).
- Pignoise: "Estoy enfermo" (2009).
- Fernando Tejero: "So payaso" (2010).
- Porretas: "Dos pulgas en un perro" (2011).
- Juanes: "Me enamora" (2011; live, unedited).
- Mojinos Escozíos y Ariel Rot: "Al carajo" (2011).
- Pablo Motos: "Marco" (2011).
- Malú: El apagón (2011) (live, unedited).
- Leonel García: "Para empezar" (2011; live, unedited).
- Pablo Alborán, Dani Martín, Malú, Carlos Baute, Rasel y La Dama: "Cuestión de prioridades por el cuerno de África" (2012).
- Malú: "Amigo" (2012).
- Lolita Flores: "Arriba los corazones", by Antonio Flores (live, unedited).
- Malú: "Con solo una sonrisa" (live, unedited).
- La Dama: "Corazón de peón" (live, unedited).
- Rasel: "Por qué" (2013).
- La Dama: "Estrella fugaz" (2014).
- Margarett: "Por ti" (2014).
- Laura Pausini: "Entre tú y mil mares" (2014).
- Antonio Orozco, Manuel Carrasco, Malú, Alejandro Sanz: "Mi Héroe" (2016)
- Ha*Ash: "Destino o Casualidad" (2017)
- Carlos Vives: "El Arrepentido" (2018)
- Beret: "Desde Cero" (2019)

== Tours ==
- Un Alumno Más (2015)
- Directo a Septiembre (2016)
- Quitate las Gafas (2017)
- Ahora (2018)
- Mi Cubo de Rubik (2019)
- 20 Años Sin Noticias (2024-2025)
