= Carminho =

Portuguese singer (born 1984)

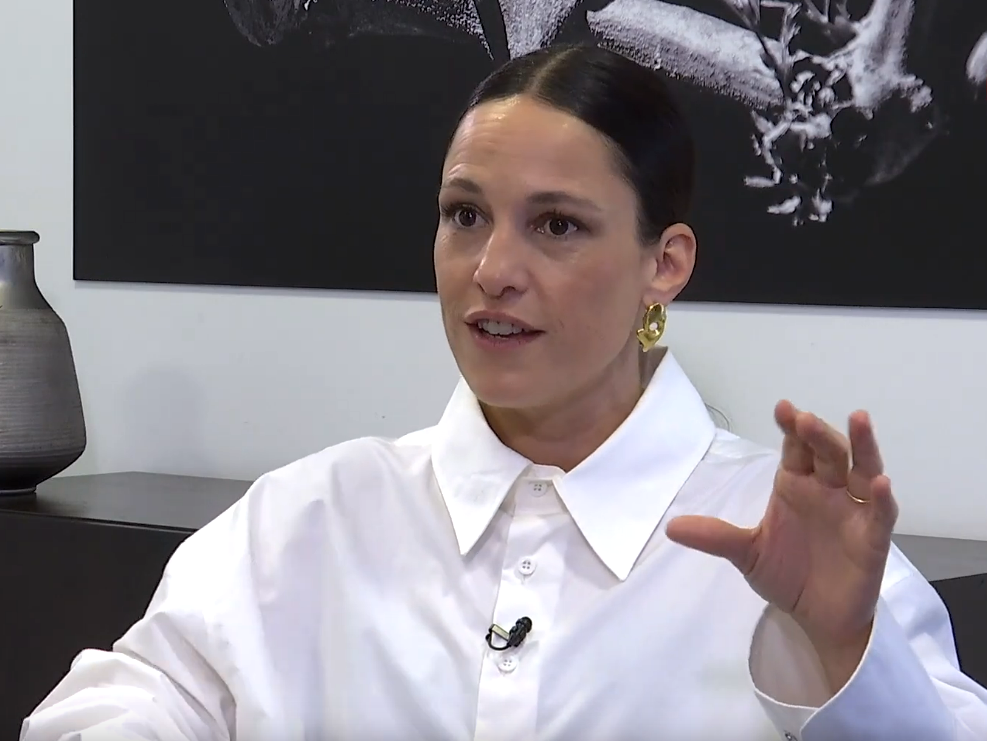
- Carminho in 2024

Background information
- Also known as: Carminho
- Born: Maria do Carmo Carvalho Rebelo de Andrade; 20 August 1984 (age 41); Lisbon, Portugal
- Genres: Fado, MPB, jazz, pop
- Occupation: Singer
- Years active: 2003–present
- Label: Warner Music Portugal
- Website: carminho.music/en

Maria do Carmo Carvalho Rebelo de Andrade (born 20 August 1984), better known as Carminho ([kɐɾˈmiɲu]), is a Portuguese fado singer. She comes from a family of musicians, since her mother, Teresa Siqueira, was a famous fado singer. She can be considered as a crossover artist, since her eclectic work shows the heritage of both traditional and contemporary fado, as she also delves into other genres such as MPB, jazz and pop.

Carminho earned stardom status in Spain after being featured on Pablo Alborán's "Perdóname" which was a number-one single in the Spanish charts. Carminho's albums Fado and Alma have achieved Platinum and Gold status in Portugal selling more than 50,000 copies combined. She received a Latin Grammy nomination for Best Portuguese Language Roots Album at the 24th Annual Latin Grammy Awards in 2023.

== Biography ==
Maria do Carmo Carvalho Rebelo de Andrade was born on 20 August 1984, in the city of Lisbon, Portugal. She was introduced to fado music at an early age, largely due to the influence of her mother, Teresa Siqueira, a well-known fado singer. During her childhood, the family relocated to the Algarve, where her parents regularly hosted informal fado gatherings at their home. These early experiences contributed to her familiarity with the musical and expressive nuances of the genre.

At the age of 12, Carminho made her first public performance at the Coliseu dos Recreios in Lisbon. The family later returned to Lisbon when her father, a civil engineer, left his profession to support Siqueira's initiative to open a fado venue, Taberna do Embuçado. Through this establishment, Carminho was introduced to prominent figures in the fado tradition, including Amália Rodrigues, Beatriz Conceição, and Celeste Rodrigues, and was exposed to the performances of artists such as Camané.

Although she maintained a strong connection to music, Carminho initially pursued academic studies and completed a degree in marketing and advertising. Following graduation, she spent a year traveling abroad, participating in humanitarian missions. She has cited this period as formative in shaping her personal and artistic identity. Upon returning to Portugal, she decided to pursue a professional music career, believing that her experiences had given her the emotional maturity required to interpret fado. Carminho has been married to music producer João Gomes since 2018. Two years later, it was reported that she became pregnant, and on 26 May 2020, she announced the birth of her first daughter.

== Performances ==
Carminho performed at WOMADelaide in 2014. Carminho performed on 23 June 2016 at the Gibraltar World Music Festival in St. Michael's Cave.

== Discography ==
=== Studio albums ===
Title	Album details	Peak chart positions					Certifications
Title	Album details	POR	AUT	SPA	FIN	SWE	Certifications
Fado	First studio album; Released: 22 May 2009; Label: EMI Music	2	—	67	—	—	AFP: Platinum
Alma	Released: 2 March 2012; Label: EMI Music	1	—	21	27	32	AFP: Platinum
Canto	Released: 2014; Label: Warner Music	1	—	71	—	—	AFP: Platinum
Carminho canta Tom Jobim	Released: 2 December 2016; Label: Warner Music	1	—	—	—	—	AFP: Platinum
Maria	Released: 30 November 2018; Label: Warner Music Portugal	4	68	—	—	—	AFP: Gold
Portuguesa	Released: 3 March 2023; Label: Warner Music Portugal	1	—	—	—	—	
Eu Vou Morrer de Amor ou Resistir	Released: 10 October 2025; Label: Sony Music	7	—	—	—	—	
"—" denotes a title that did not chart, or was not released in that territory.

=== Singles ===
==== As featured artist ====
Title	Year	Peak chart positions		Album
Title	Year	POR	SPA	Album
"Perdóname" (Pablo Alborán featuring Carminho)	2011	—	1	
"O Amor é Assim" (HMB featuring Carminho)	2016	3	—	
"Onde vais" (Bárbara Bandeira featuring Carminho)	2021	16	—	
