= Alejandro Sanz discography =

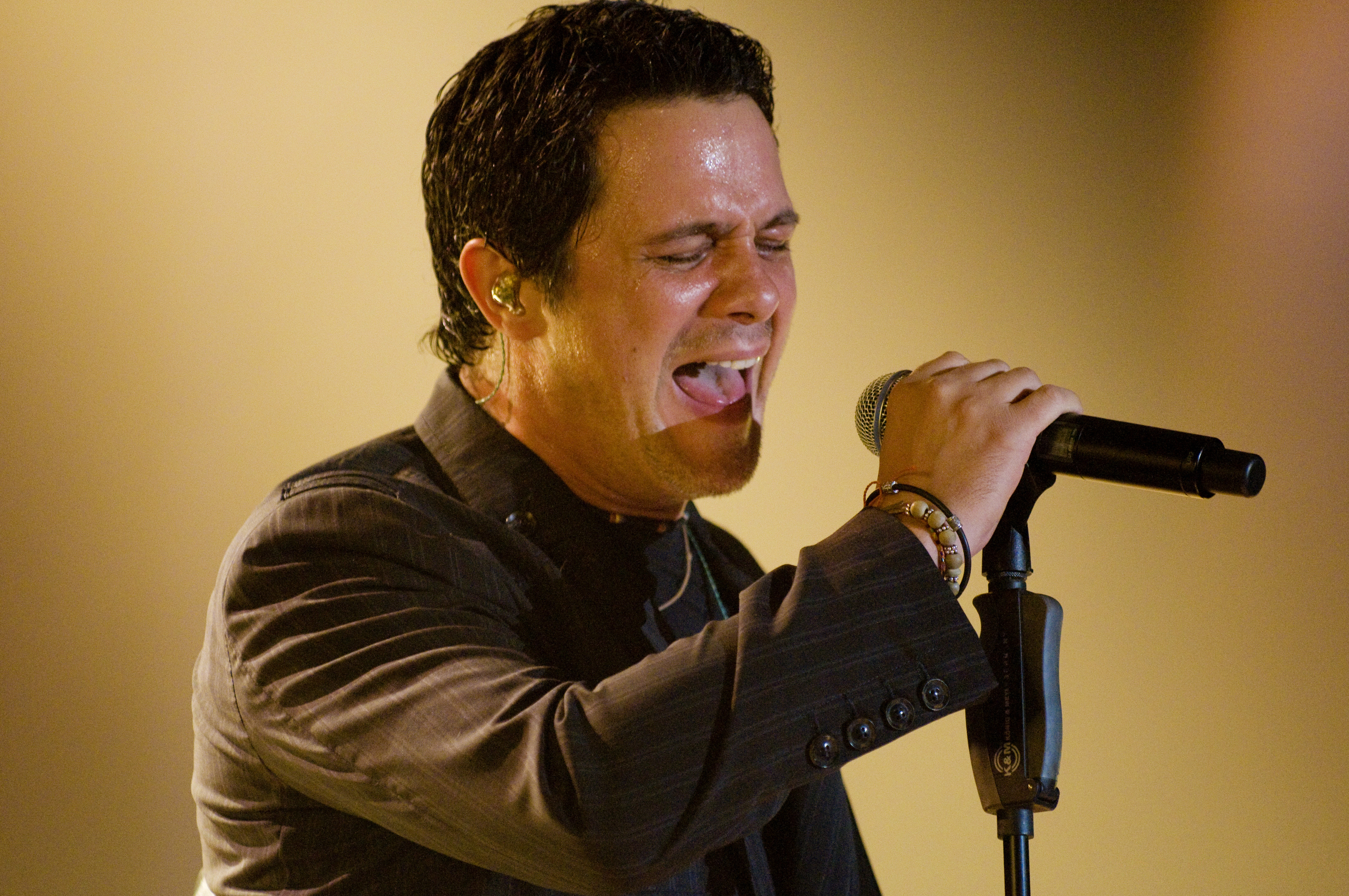
- Alejandro Sanz in 2008
- Studio albums: 12
- Compilation albums: 3
- Singles: 36
- Video albums: 7
- Music videos: 73
- Live albums: 3
- Featured singles: 3

The discography of Alejandro Sanz, a Spanish singer, songwriter and musician, consists of twelve studio albums, three live albums, three compilation albums, thirty-five singles (including all singles from studio, live, compilation albums and collaborations with other singers).

Sanz released his debut album at age nineteen, although he did not gain commercial success in Spain until his second release, Viviendo Deprisa. His next two records, Si Tú Me Miras (1993) and 3 (1995) also fared well commercially, but it was his 1997 breakthrough album Más that garnered international success. El Alma al Aire followed in 2000, selling more than a million copies in its first week. In 2002, he became the first Spanish artist to record an MTV Unplugged album.

His collaboration with Shakira on the 2005 single "La Tortura" reached number one on several charts worldwide. He experimented with more diverse styles of music with the albums No Es lo Mismo (2003) and El Tren de los Momentos (2006), while his 2009 release, Paraíso Express served as a return to form for the musician. Sanz signed to Universal Music Group in 2011 and released his tenth studio album, La Música No Se Toca, in 2012, followed by Sirope in 2015.

== Albums ==
=== Studio albums ===
Title	Details	Peak chart positions							Certifications
Title	Details	SPA	MEX	NLD	PT	SWI	US	US Latin	Certifications
Los Chulos Son Pa' Cuidarlos	as Alejandro Magno; Released: 1989; Label: Hispavox; Formats: LP	—	—	—	—	—	—	—	
Viviendo Deprisa	Released: 20 August 1991; Label: WEA; Formats: CD, LP, Cassette	2	—	—	—	—	—	—	PROMUSICAE: 9× Platinum; AMPROFON: 2× Gold
Si Tú Me Miras	Released: 17 August 1993; Label: WEA; Formats: CD, LP, Cassette	2	—	—	—	—	—	—	PROMUSICAE: 5× Platinum
3	Released: 13 June 1995; Label: WEA; Formats: CD, Cassette	1	—	78	—	—	—	—	PROMUSICAE: 8× Platinum
Más	Released: 9 September 1997; Label: WEA; Formats: CD, LP, Cassette	1	1	—	—	—	—	5	PROMUSICAE: 22× Platinum; RIAA: 6× Platinum (Latin); AMPROFON: 3× Platinum
El Alma al Aire	Released: 26 September 2000; Label: WEA; Formats: CD, LP, Cassette	1	1	—	—	71	148	3	PROMUSICAE: 13× Platinum; RIAA: 2× Platinum (Latin); AMPROFON: 5× Gold
No Es lo Mismo	Released: 2 September 2003; Label: WEA; Formats: CD, Cassette	1	2	—	17	—	128	2	PROMUSICAE: 8× Platinum; RIAA: Platinum (Latin); AMPROFON: 2× Platinum
El Tren de los Momentos	Released: 7 November 2006; Label: WEA; Formats: CD, LP, Cassette	1	6	—	—	—	66	3	PROMUSICAE: 4× Platinum; RIAA: Platinum (Latin); AMPROFON: Platinum+Gold
Paraíso Express	Released: 10 November 2009; Label: WEA; Formats: CD, LP, download	1	1	—	—	—	84	1	PROMUSICAE: 3× Platinum; AMPROFON: Platinum
La Música No Se Toca	Released: 25 September 2012; Label: Universal; Formats: CD, CD+DVD, download	1	1	—	29	—	26	1	PROMUSICAE: 5× Platinum; RIAA: Gold (Latin); AMPROFON: 2× Platinum+Gold
Sirope	Released: 4 May 2015; Label: Universal Music Group; Formats: CD, LP, download	1	2	—	—	—	—	1	PROMUSICAE: 5× Platinum; AMPROFON: Platinum
#ElDisco	Released: 5 April 2019; Label: Universal Music Group; Formats: CD, LP, download	1	2	—	—	—	—	2	PROMUSICAE: 3× Platinum; AMPROFON: Gold
Sanz	Released: 9 December 2021; Label: Universal Music Group; Formats: CD, download	1	—	—	—	—	—	—	PROMUSICAE: Platinum
¿Y Ahora Qué +?	Released: 21 November 2025; Label: Sony Music Entertainment; Formats: CD, download	2	—	—	—	—	—	—	PROMUSICAE: Platinum; RIAA: Gold (Latin)

=== Live albums ===
Title	Details	Peak chart positions				Certifications
Title	Details	SPA	MEX	PT	US Latin	Certifications
Básico	Released: 18 March 1994; Label: WEA; Formats: CD, Cassette	18	—	—	—	PROMUSICAE: 2× Platinum
MTV Unplugged	Released: 20 November 2001; Label: WEA; Formats: CD	1	1	—	1	PROMUSICAE: 5× Platinum; RIAA: 2× Platinum (Latin); AMPROFON: 2× Platinum
El Tren de los Momentos: En Vivo Desde Buenos Aires	Released: 30 October 2007; Label: WEA; Formats: CD+DVD	17	26	19	—	
Canciones Para Un Paraíso En Vivo	Released: 5 July 2010; Label: WEA; Formats: CD+DVD	14	27	—	—	
La Musica No Se Toca En Vivo	Released: 11 November 2013; Label: Universal Music Spain; Formats: Digital Download	—	—	—	9	
Sirope En Vivo	Released: 27 November 2015; Label: Universal Music Spain; Formats: Digital Download	—	—	—	8	
+Es+ El Concierto	Released: 8 December 2017; Label: Universal Music Spain; Formats: Digital Download	1	—	—	7	PROMUSICAE: 2× Platinum

=== Compilation albums ===
Title	Details	Peak chart positions			Certifications
Title	Details	SPA	MEX	US Latin	Certifications
Discografía Completa: Edición Especial Gira 98	Released: 1998; Label: WEA; Formats: 4CD	—	—	—	
Best of Alejandro Sanz	Released: 1999; Label: Warner Music Group|WEA Latina; Formats: CD	—	—	—	
Lo Esencial de... Alejandro Sanz	Released: 20 November 2001; Label: WEA; Formats: 3CD	—	—	—	
Grandes Éxitos 91_04	US title: Grandes Éxitos 97_04; Released: 16 November 2004; Label: WEA; Formats: 2CD, 3CD, CD	1	5	18	PROMUSICAE: 3× Platinum; AMPROFON: Gold
Colección Definitiva	Released: 16 November 2011; Label: WEA; Formats: 4CD+DVD, 2CD, 2CD+DVD, CD	7	36	70	PROMUSICAE: Platinum
Álbumes de Estudio 1991–2009	Released: 27 November 2012; Label: WEA; Formats: 8CD	75	—	—	
"—" denotes releases that did not chart.

=== Special editions ===
Title	Details	Charts
Title	Details	SPA
El Alma al Aire: Edición Especial	Released: 6 June 2001; Label: WEA; Formats: 2CD	—
No Es lo Mismo: Edición Especial Gira	Released: 27 July 2004; Label: WEA; Formats: CD+DVD	—
El Tren de los Momentos: Edición Especial	Released: 22 May 2007; Label: WEA; Formats: 2CD+DVD	—
Paraíso Express – Edicíon Especial Gira	Released: April 2010; Label: WEA; Formats: 2CD+DVD	15

== Singles ==
=== As lead artist ===
Year	Single	Peak chart positions				Certifications	Album
Year	Single	SPA	US Latin	US Latin Pop	US Latin Trop	Certifications	Album
1991	"Pisando Fuerte"	1	—	—	—		Viviendo Deprisa
1992	"Se le Apagó la Luz"	1	—	—	—		Viviendo Deprisa
1992	"Lo Que Fui Es Lo Que Soy"	1	—	—	—		Viviendo Deprisa
1993	"Si Tú Me Miras"	1	—	—	—		Si Tú Me Miras
1993	"Cómo Te Echo de Menos"	—	—	—	—		Si Tú Me Miras
1994	"Este Pobre Mortal"	—	—	—	—		Si Tú Me Miras
1995	"La Fuerza del Corazón"	1	—	9	—		3
1995	"Mi Soledad y Yo"	1	—	—	—		3
1995	"¿Lo Ves?"	—	—	—	—		3
1996	"Quiero Morir en Tu Veneno"	1	—	—	—		3
1997	"Y, ¿Si Fuera Ella?"	1	13	3	9		Más
1997	"Corazón Partío"	1	3	3	7		Más
1998	"Siempre Es de Noche"	—	40	18	—		Más
1998	"Amiga Mía"	—	2	1	5		Más
1998	"Aquello Que Me Diste"	—	9	3	13		Más
2000	"Cuando Nadie Me Ve"	1	12	9	7		El Alma al Aire
2000	"Quisiera Ser"	1	17	13	9		El Alma al Aire
2001	"El Alma al Aire"	1	40	17	30		El Alma al Aire
2001	"Llega, Llegó Soledad"	—	—	—	—		El Alma al Aire
2001	"Y Sólo Se Me Ocurre Amarte"	1	10	5	14		MTV Unplugged
2002	"Aprendiz"	—	13	10	—		MTV Unplugged
2002	"Toca Para Mí"	—	38	18	23		MTV Unplugged
2003	"No Es lo Mismo"	1	4	3	23		No Es Lo Mismo
2004	"Regálame la Silla Donde Te Esperé"	—	23	16	—		No Es Lo Mismo
2004	"Eso"	—	25	13	—		No Es Lo Mismo
2004	"He Sido Tan Feliz Contigo"	—	—	—	—		No Es Lo Mismo
2004	"Try To Save Your S'ong"	—	—	—	—		No Es Lo Mismo
2004	"Tú No Tienes Alma"	—	18	12	—		Grandes Éxitos 91_04
2006	"A la Primera Persona"	—	1	1	12		El Tren de los Momentos
2006	"Te Lo Agradezco, Pero No" (featuring Shakira)	1	1	1	4		El Tren de los Momentos
2007	"Enséñame Tus Manos"	—	—	29	—		El Tren de los Momentos
2007	"En la Planta de tus Pies"	—	—	—	—		El Tren de los Momentos
2009	"Looking for Paradise" (featuring Alicia Keys)	1	1	1	1		Paraíso Express
2009	"¿Desde Cuándo?"	5	18	7	—		Paraíso Express
2010	"Nuestro Amor Será Leyenda"	11	25	5	—		Paraíso Express
2010	"Lola Soledad"	31	—	—	—		Paraíso Express
2012	"No Me Compares" (solo or featuring Ivete Sangalo)	1	1	1	1		La Música No Se Toca
2012	"Se Vende"	3	23	7	11		La Música No Se Toca
2012	"Mi Marciana"	10	41	14	39		La Música No Se Toca
2013	"Irrepetível" (featuring Ana Carolina)	—	—	—	—		La Música No Se Toca
2013	"Camino de Rosas"	18	—	—	—		La Música No Se Toca
2013	"This Game Is Over" (featuring Emeli Sandé and Jamie Foxx)	9	—	—	—		Non-album single
2015	"Un Zombie a la Intemperie"	1	19	2	10		Sirope
2015	"A Que No Me Dejas"	3	—	—	—		Sirope
2016	"Deja Que Te Bese" (featuring Marc Anthony)	1	—	—	—		Non-album single
2017	"Y, ¿Si Fuera Ella? (+ Es +)" (featuring various artists)	—	—	—	—		+ Es +
2018	"Llueve Alegría" (with Malú)	76	—	—	—		Oxígeno
2018	"No Tengo Nada"	19	—	—	—		#ElDisco
2019	"Back in the City" (with Nicky Jam)	20	—	31	—		#ElDisco
2019	"Mi Persona Favorita" (with Camila Cabello)	22	—	—	—	PROMUSICAE: 3× Platinum; RIAA: Gold (Latin)	#ElDisco
2019	"El Trato"	—	—	—	—		#ElDisco
2020	"Un Beso en Madrid" (with TINI)						Tini Tini Tini
2021	"Lejos Conmigo" (with Greeicy)						La Carta
2022	"Nasa" (with Camilo)	57	—	—	—		De Adentro Pa' Fuera
2023	"Correcaminos" (with Danny Ocean)						Correcaminos
2025	"Bésame" (with Shakira)	66				PROMUSICAE: Gold; RIAA: Gold (Latin)	¿Y Ahora Qué?
2025	"No Me Tires Flores" (with Rels B)	53					
"—" denotes the single failed to chart or not released

=== As featured artist ===
Year	Single	Peak chart positions				Album
Year	Single	SPA	US Latin	US Latin Pop	US Latin Trop	Album
2001	"Una Noche" (with The Corrs)	—	—	—	—	In Blue (Latin American edition)
2005	"La Tortura" (with Shakira)	1	1	1	1	Fijación Oral Vol. 1
2005	"Tu Corazón" (with Lena)	—	—	—	—	Lena
2008	"Corazón Partío" (with Ivete Sangalo)	—	—	—	—	Multishow ao Vivo: Ivete no Maracanã
2010	"Gracias a la Vida" (with various artists)	—	—	—	—	Non-album singles
2013	"Next to Me" (Spanglish Remix) (with Emeli Sandé)	47	—	—	—	Non-album singles
2013	"Víveme" (with Laura Pausini)	—	34	10	—	20 – Grandes Éxitos
2015	"No Soy Una de Esas" (Jesse & Joy featuring Alejandro Sanz)	34	—	—	—	Un Besito Más
2018	"Cuenta Pendiente" (Paty Cantú featuring Alejandro Sanz)	—	—	—	—	#333Deluxe
"—" denotes the single failed to chart or not released

== Other charted songs ==
Year	Song	Peak chart positions	Album
Year	Song	SPA	Album
2015	"Capitán Tapón"	9	Sirope
2015	"Pero tú"	24	Sirope
2015	"A mí no me importa"	36	Sirope
2019	"El Trato"	76	#ElDisco
2019	"Te Canto un Son"	43	#ElDisco
2024	"Palmeras en el jardín"	70	¿Y Ahora Qué?
2025	"Las Guapas"	61	¿Y Ahora Qué?

== Videography ==
=== Video albums ===
- 1998: El Concierto: Tour Más 98
- 1998: Los Videos
- 2001: El Alma al Aire: En Directo
- 2004: En Concierto: Gira No Es Lo Mismo 2004
- 2005: Los Conciertos
- 2005: Grandes Éxitos: Los Videos 91-04
- 2007: El Tren de los Momentos: En Vivo Desde Buenos Aires
- 2010: Canciones Para Un Paraíso En Vivo

=== Music videos ===
Year	Title	Album
1991	"Los Dos Cogidos de la Mano"	Viviendo Deprisa
1991	"Pisando Fuerte"	Viviendo Deprisa
1993	"Si Tú Me Miras"	Si Tú Me Miras
1995	"La Fuerza del Corazón"	3
1995	"Mi Soledad y Yo"	3
1995	"¿Lo Ves?"	3
1998	"Y, ¿Si Fuera Ella?"	Más
1998	"Corazón Partío"	Más
1998	"Siempre Es de Noche"	Más
1998	"Amiga Mía"	Más
1998	"Si Hay Dios..."	Más
1998	"Aquello Que Me Diste"	Más
1998	"Corazón Partío (Latin Mix)"	non-album
2000	"Cuando Nadie Me Ve"	El Alma al Aire
2000	"Quisiera Ser"	El Alma al Aire
2000	"El Alma al Aire"	El Alma al Aire
2003	"No Es Lo Mismo"	No Es Lo Mismo
2003	"Regálame la Silla Donde Te Esperé"	No Es Lo Mismo
2004	"He Sido Tan Feliz Conmigo"	No Es Lo Mismo
2004	"Try to Save Your S'ong"	No Es Lo Mismo
2004	"Tú No Tienes Alma"	Grandes Éxitos 91_04
2006	"A la Primera Persona"	El Tren de los Momentos
2006	"Te Lo Agradezco, Pero No" (with Shakira)	El Tren de los Momentos
2007	"Enséñame Tus Manos"	El Tren de los Momentos
2009	"Looking for Paradise" (with Alicia Keys)	Paraíso Express
2009	"¿Desde Cuándo?"	Paraíso Express
2010	"Nuestro Amor Será Leyenda"	Paraíso Express
2010	"Lola Soledad"	Paraíso Express
2012	"No Me Compares"	La Música No Se Toca
2012	"Se Vende"	La Música No Se Toca
2012	"Mi Marciana"	La Música No Se Toca
2013	"Irrepetível" (with Ana Carolina)	La Música No Se Toca
2013	"Camino de Rosas"	La Música No Se Toca
2013	"This Game Is Over" (with Emeli Sandé and Jamie Foxx)	non-album
2015	"Un Zombie a la Intemperie"	Sirope
2015	"A Que No Me Dejas"	Sirope
2015	"Capitán Tapón"	Sirope
2016	"Deja Que Te Bese" (with Marc Anthony)	non-album
2017	"Y, ¿Si Fuera Ella?" (with various artists' only vocals)	+ Es +
2018	"No Tengo Nada"	#ElDisco
2018	"Back in the City" (with Nicky Jam)	#ElDisco
2018	"Mi Persona Favorita" (with Camila Cabello)	#ElDisco
2019	"El Trato"	#ElDisco
2020	"El Verano Que Vivimos"	El Verano Que Vivimos (Banda Sonora Original)
2021	"Bio"	Sanz
2021	"Mares de Miel"	Sanz
2022	"Iba"	Sanz
2022	"Yo No Quiero Suerte"	Sanz
2023	"Correcaminos"	Correcaminos
2024	"Palmeras en el Jardín"	¿Y Ahora Qué?
2024	"Hoy No Me Siento Bien" (with Grupo Frontera)	¿Y Ahora Qué?
2025	"Bésame" (with Shakira)	¿Y Ahora Qué?
2025	"El Vino de Tu Boca"	¿Y Ahora Qué?
2025	"¿Cómo Sería?" (with Manuel Turizo)	¿Y Ahora Qué?
2025	"No Me Tires Flores" (with Rels B)	non-album

=== Collaborations in music videos ===
Year	Title	Other Performer	Album
2001	"El Último Adiós"	Various artists	non-album
2001	"Una Noche"	The Corrs	In Blue (Latin American edition)
2001	"The Hardest Way"	The Corrs	non-album
2005	"La Tortura"	Shakira	Fijación Oral, Vol. 1
2005	"Tu Corazón"	Lena	Lena
2010	"Gracias a la Vida"	Various artists	non-album
2010	"Ay Haití"	Various artists	non-album
2011	"Yesterday I Heard the Rain"	Tony Bennett	Duets II
2013	"Víveme"	Laura Pausini	20 – Grandes Éxitos
2015	"No Soy Una de Esas"	Jesse & Joy	Un Besito Más
2018	"Cuenta Pendiente"	Paty Cantú	#333Deluxe
2018	"Llueve Alegría"	Malú	Oxígeno
2020	"For Sale"	Carlos Vives	Cumbiana
2020	"Ojos de Mandela"	Beatriz Luengo	Cuerpo y Alma
2021	"Flaca"	Andrés Calamaro	Dios Los Cría
2021	"Lejos Conmigo"	Greeicy	non-album
2022	"NASA"	Camilo	non-album
2022	"Soy"	Eros Ramazzotti	Latido Infinito
