= La Música No Se Toca Tour =

2012–14 concert tour by Alejandro Sanz

- World tour by Alejandro Sanz
- Associated album: La Música No Se Toca
- Start date: October 10, 2012
- End date: August 22, 2014
- Legs: 3
- No. of shows: 47 in Latin America; 26 in Europe; 7 North America; 80 Total

Alejandro Sanz concert chronology
- Paraiso Tour (2009-2011); La Música No Se Toca Tour (2012-2014); Sirope Tour (2015)

La Música No Se Toca Tour is a concert tour by Spanish singer Alejandro Sanz as promoting his album La Música No Se Toca. In order to start promoting the album the artist made special presentations in Miami (Olympia Theater and Office Building), New York and Puerto Rico, and then officially start the tour in Mexico.

== History ==
The tour officially began in Mexico for the following cities: Puebla, Mexico City, Cancun, Mérida, Monterrey, Guadalajara, Tijuana and San Luis Potosí for a total of 10 concerts. Sanz subsequently performed a private concert at the House of Blues in Los Angeles, United States. In November, he traveled to Spain specifically to Barcelona for three concerts at the Palau de la Música Catalana. Return to Miami to close their presentations with a concert unprecedented broadcast to 17 countries through the Terra.com.

Starts 2013 with his Latin American tour in nine countries (Colombia, Peru, Uruguay, Argentina, Chile, Brazil, Ecuador, Panama and Costa Rica) for a total of 19 concerts. After he travels to United States for concerts in Los Angeles, New York, Washington and Miami. Then close this leg of the tour with a show in Puerto Rico.

In May began his triumphal tour for Spain where he visited Barcelona, Bilbao, Murcia, Alicante, Valencia, Zaragoza, La Coruna, Sevilla, Granada, Malaga, Madrid, Valladolid, Mallorca, Cordoba, Cadiz, Almeria, Ontinyent, Perelada, San Carlos de la Rapita and Marbella; for a total of 22 concerts. After a short break, back to Mexico to make 16 presentations over the following locations: Mexico City, Guadalajara, Monterrey, Durango, Leon, Aguascalientes, Villahermosa, Querétaro y Puebla.

During the 2014 he presented a recital in Veracruz, Mexico and another in Punta Cana, Dominican Republic. Then participate during the month of August to the "Starlite Festival" in Marbella, Spain.

== Setlist ==
La Música No Se Toca Tour

La Música No Se Toca Tour : (80 shows) Oct/10/2012 – Aug/22/2014
No.	Title	Original album	Length
1.	"Llamando a la Mujer Acción"	La Música No Se Toca
2.	"Cómo Decir Sin Andar Diciendo"	La Música No Se Toca
3.	"Se Vende"	La Música No Se Toca
4.	"Desde Cuándo"	Paraíso Express
5.	"Medley 1" (Nuestro Amor Será Leyenda / El Alma al Aire / Labana)	Paraíso Express, El Alma al Aire, No Es lo Mismo
6.	"Quisiera Ser"	El Alma al Aire
7.	"Camino de Rosas"	La Música No Se Toca
8.	"Medley 2" (Enséñame Tus Manos / Para Que Me Quieras / Hay Un Universo de Pequeñas Cosas / Me Iré)	El Tren de los Momentos, El Alma al Aire
9.	"Cuando Nadie Me Ve"	El Alma al Aire
10.	"Mi Soledad y Yo"	3
11.	"La Fuerza del Corazón (instrumental)"	3
12.	"Yo Te Traigo... 20 Años"	La Música No Se Toca
13.	"Corazón Partío"	Más
14.	"Nena"	La Música No Se Toca
15.	"¿Lo Ves? / Mientes"	3
16.	"No Me Compares"	La Música No Se Toca
17.	"No Es Lo Mismo"	No Es lo Mismo
18.	"Looking for Paradise"	Paraíso Express
19.	"La Música No Se Toca"	La Música No Se Toca
20.	"Camino a Casa"	La Música No Se Toca
21.	"Mi Marciana"	La Música No Se Toca
22.	"Medley 3" (Amiga Mía / Y, ¿Si Fuera Ella?)	Más

== Tour dates ==
Date	City	Country	Venue
North America I
October 10, 2012	Puebla	Mexico	Auditorio Siglo XXI
October 12, 2012	Mexico City	Mexico	Foro Sol
October 15, 2012	Cancún	Mexico	Estadio de Béisbol Beto Ávila
October 16, 2012	Mérida	Mexico	Estadio De Béisbol Kukulkán
October 19, 2012	Monterrey	Mexico	Auditorio Banamex
October 20, 2012	Monterrey	Mexico	Auditorio Banamex
October 24, 2012	Guadalajara	Mexico	Telmex Auditorium
October 26, 2012	Guadalajara	Mexico	Telmex Auditorium
October 28, 2012	San Luis Potosí	Mexico	Estadio De Béisbol Veinte de Noviembre
November 1, 2012	Tijuana	Mexico	Estadio Caliente
November 10, 2012	Los Angeles	United States	House of Blues
Europe I
November 28, 2012	Barcelona	Spain	Palau de la Música Catalana
November 29, 2012	Barcelona	Spain	Palau de la Música Catalana
December 1, 2012	Barcelona	Spain	Palau de la Música Catalana
North America II
December 6, 2012	Miami	United States	Bamboo Night Club at Miami Beach (Terra Live Music)
South America
January 12, 2013	Manizales	Colombia	Estadio Palogrande (Feria de Manizales)
February 26, 2013	Lima	Peru	Estadio Nacional
February 28, 2013	Montevideo	Uruguay	Rural del Prado – Predio de Exposiciones y Eventos
March 2, 2013	Rosario	Argentina	Metropolitano
March 4, 2013	Córdoba	Argentina	Orfeo Superdomo
March 5, 2013	Mendoza	Argentina	Teatro Frank Romero Day (Fiesta Nacional de la Vendimia)
March 7, 2013	Buenos Aires	Argentina	Estadio G.E.B.A.
March 9, 2013	Buenos Aires	Argentina	Estadio G.E.B.A.
March 10, 2013	Buenos Aires	Argentina	Estadio G.E.B.A.
March 13, 2013	Santiago	Chile	Movistar Arena
March 15, 2013	Santiago	Chile	Movistar Arena
March 18, 2013	São Paulo	Brazil	Credicard Hall
March 19, 2013	Rio de Janeiro	Brazil	Citibank Hall
March 21, 2013	Porto Alegre	Brazil	Auditório Araújo Vianna
April 18, 2013	Guayaquil	Ecuador	Estadio Modelo Alberto Spencer Herrera
April 20, 2013	Quito	Ecuador	Coliseo General Rumiñahui
April 23, 2013	Bogotá	Colombia	Coliseo Cubierto el Campín
April 25, 2013	Panama City	Panama	Figali Convention Center
North America III
April 27, 2013	San José	Costa Rica	Estadio Ricardo Saprissa Aymá
May 1, 2013	Los Angeles	United States	Nokia Theatre
May 4, 2013	New York City	United States	Radio City Music Hall
May 7, 2013	Washington, D.C.	United States	DAR Constitution Hall
May 9, 2013	Miami	United States	American Airlines Arena
May 12, 2013	San Juan	Puerto Rico	José Miguel Agrelot Coliseum
Europe II
May 29, 2013	Barcelona	Spain	Palau Sant Jordi
May 30, 2013	Barcelona	Spain	Palau Sant Jordi
June 1, 2013	Bilbao	Spain	Bilbao Arena
June 7, 2013	Murcia	Spain	Plaza de Toros
June 8, 2013	Alicante	Spain	Instituto Ferial de Alicante (IFA)
June 12, 2013	Valencia	Spain	Explanada del Veles e Vents Marina Real Juan Carlos I
June 13, 2013	Zaragoza	Spain	Pabellón Príncipe Felipe
June 15, 2013	A Coruña	Spain	Coliseum da Coruña
June 19, 2013	Seville	Spain	Estadio de La Cartuja
June 21, 2013	Granada	Spain	Palacio Municipal de Deportes de Granada
June 22, 2013	Málaga	Spain	Palacio de Deportes José María Martín Carpena
June 26, 2013	Madrid	Spain	Palacio de Deportes de la Comunidad de Madrid
June 27, 2013	Madrid	Spain	Palacio de Deportes de la Comunidad de Madrid
June 29, 2013	Valladolid	Spain	Plaza de toros de Valladolid (Valladolid Latino)
July 3, 2013	Palma de Mallorca	Spain	Plaza de Toros
July 5, 2013	Córdoba	Spain	Plaza de Toros de Córdoba (Festival de la Guitarra)
July 6, 2013	Cádiz	Spain	Estadio Ramón de Carranza
July 27, 2013	Almería	Spain	Palacio de los Juegos Mediterráneos
August 3, 2013	Ontinyent	Spain	Campo de Fútbol Municipal El Clariano
August 7, 2013	Peralada	Spain	Peralada Castle (Festival Castell de Perelada)
August 8, 2013	Sant Carles de la Ràpita	Spain	Campo Municipal de Deportes La Devesa
August 11, 2013	Marbella	Spain	La Cantera de Nagüeles (Starlite Festival)
North America IV
September 5, 2013	Mexico City	Mexico	Centro Cultural Roberto Cantoral
September 7, 2013	Guadalajara	Mexico	Telmex Auditorium
October 1, 2013	Mexico City	Mexico	National Auditorium
October 2, 2013	Mexico City	Mexico	National Auditorium
October 4, 2013	Mexico City	Mexico	National Auditorium
October 5, 2013	Mexico City	Mexico	National Auditorium
October 8, 2013	Mexico City	Mexico	National Auditorium
October 9, 2013	Mexico City	Mexico	National Auditorium
October 11, 2013	Monterrey	Mexico	Auditorio Banamex
October 13, 2013	Durango	Mexico	Plaza de Armas
October 15, 2013	León	Mexico	Poliforum León
October 17, 2013	Aguascalientes	Mexico	Plaza de Toros Monumental de Aguascalientes
October 19, 2013	Villahermosa	Mexico	Teatro Al Aire Libre Tabasco 2000
October 22, 2013	Querétaro	Mexico	Auditorio Josefa Ortiz de Domínguez
October 24, 2013	Monterrey	Mexico	Auditorio Banamex
October 26, 2013	Puebla	Mexico	Auditorio Siglo XXI
March 5, 2014	Veracruz	Mexico	Macroplaza del Malecón
March 22, 2014	Punta Cana	Dominican Republic	Hard Rock Hotel & Casino
Europe III
August 22, 2014	Marbella	Spain	La Cantera de Nagüeles (Starlite Festival)

- The concert on October 12, 2012 in Foro Sol of Mexico City was broadcast on February 2, 2013 by the Channel of the Stars of Televisa.
- The concert on December 6, 2012 in Bamboo Night Club Miami was broadcast to 17 countries through of Terra.com.
- The concert on March 9, 2013 in Estadio GEBA of Buenos Aires was broadcast on Channel QMusica
- The concert on June 19, 2013 in Estadio de La Cartuja of Sevilla was recorded for the CD / DVD, "La Música No Se Toca En Vivo".

=== Box office score data (Billboard) ===
Venue	City	Tickets sold / Available	Gross Revenue
Foro Sol (2012)	México City	47,144 / 51,728 (91%)	$1,916,879
Auditorio Banamex (2012)	Monterrey	13,391 / 13,414 (99%)	$1,166,059
Total		60,535 / 65,142 (93%)	$3,082,938

== Personnel ==
- Mike Ciro – Musical Director and Guitar
- Alfonso Pérez – Piano, Vocal and Guitar
- Chris Hierro – Keyboards and Vocal
- Nathaniel Townsley – Drums
- Carlos Martín – Percussion, Wind and Keyboards
- Bri (Brigitte) Sosa – Bass and Vocal
- Brittany Denaro – Guitar
- Julie Mendez – Wind, Vocal and Percussion
- Sara Devine / Katia Díaz / Jackie Mendez – Vocals
