= Sirope Tour =

2015–16 concert tour by Alejandro Sanz

- World tour by Alejandro Sanz
- Associated album: Sirope
- Start date: July 30, 2015
- End date: December 6, 2016
- Legs: 3
- No. of shows: 32 in Europe; 18 in Latin America; 51 Total

Alejandro Sanz concert chronology
- La Música No Se Toca Tour (2012-2014); Sirope Tour (2015); 1. LaGira Tour (2019)

Sirope Tour is a concert tour by Spanish singer Alejandro Sanz as promoting his album Sirope.

== History ==
The tour will officially begin in Spain for the following cities: Córdoba, Algeciras, Roquetas de Mar, Gijón, A Coruña, Ibiza, Palma de Mallorca, Cambrils, Palafrugell, Marbella, Benidorm, Palencia, Murcia, Valencia, Albacete, Madrid, Barcelona, Bilbao, Málaga, Granada and Sevilla for a total of 25 concerts.

== Setlist ==
Sirope Tour

Sirope Tour : (26 shows) July/30/2015 - March/06/2016
No.	Title	Original album	Length
1.	"El Silencio de los Cuervos"	Sirope
2.	"A Mi No Me Importa"	Sirope
3.	"No Madura el Coco"	Sirope
4.	"Desde Cuándo"	Paraíso Express
5.	"Quisiera Ser"	El Alma al Aire
6.	"Tú la Necesitas"	Sirope
7.	"No Me Compares"	La Música No Se Toca
8.	"La Música No Se Toca"	La Música No Se Toca
9.	"Medley" (Amiga Mía / Mi Soledad y Yo / Y, ¿Si Fuera Ella?)	Más, 3
10.	"Mi Marciana"	La Música No Se Toca
11.	"Corazón Partío"	Más
12.	"Labana"	No Es Lo Mismo
13.	"Camino de Rosas"	La Música No Se Toca
14.	"Un Zombie a la Intemperie"	Sirope
15.	"Looking for Paradise"	Paraíso Express
16.	"No Es lo Mismo"	No Es lo Mismo
17.	"¿Lo Ves?"	3
18.	"Capitán Tapón"	Sirope
19.	"A Que No Me Dejas"	Sirope
20.	"Viviendo Deprisa"	Viviendo Deprisa
21.	"Pisando Fuerte"	Viviendo Deprisa

== Tour dates ==
Date	City	Country	Venue
2015
July 30, 2015	Córdoba	Spain	Plaza de Toros de los Califas
August 1, 2015	Algeciras	Spain	Plaza de toros de Las Palomas
August 4, 2015	Roquetas de Mar	Spain	Plaza de Toros de Roquetas de Mar
August 6, 2015	Gijón	Spain	Palacio de Deportes de Gijón
August 8, 2015	A Coruña	Spain	Coliseum da Coruña
August 10, 2015	Ibiza	Spain	Campo de Fútbol "Can Misses"
August 12, 2015	Palma de Majorca	Spain	Plaza de toros de Palma de Majorca
August 14, 2015	Cambrils	Spain	Parc del Pinaret (Cambrils Festival)
August 16, 2015	Palafrugell	Spain	(Cap Roig Festival)
August 17, 2015	Palafrugell	Spain	(Cap Roig Festival)
August 20, 2015	Marbella	Spain	La Cantera de Nagüeles (Starlite Festival)
August 22, 2015	Benidorm	Spain	Estadio De Fútbol De Foietes
August 29, 2015	Palencia	Spain	Estadio Nueva Balastera
September 2, 2015	Murcia	Spain	Plaza de toros de La Condomina
September 4, 2015	Valencia	Spain	Plaza de Toros de Valencia
September 5, 2015	Albacete	Spain	Estadio Carlos Belmonte
September 8, 2015	Madrid	Spain	Barclaycard Center
September 9, 2015	Madrid	Spain	Barclaycard Center
September 11, 2015	Madrid	Spain	Barclaycard Center
September 16, 2015	Barcelona	Spain	Palau Sant Jordi
September 17, 2015	Barcelona	Spain	Palau Sant Jordi
September 19, 2015	Bilbao	Spain	Bilbao Arena
September 22, 2015	Málaga	Spain	Palacio de Deportes José María Martín Carpena
September 24, 2015	Granada	Spain	Plaza de toros de Granada
September 26, 2015	Seville	Spain	Estadio de La Cartuja
2016
January 29, 2016	Mexico City	Mexico	National Auditorium
January 30, 2016	Mexico City	Mexico	National Auditorium
February 2, 2016	Puebla	Mexico	Auditorio Metropolitano
February 4, 2016	Guadalajara	Mexico	Telmex Auditorium
February 5, 2016	Guadalajara	Mexico	Telmex Auditorium
February 7, 2016	Querétaro	Mexico	Auditorio Josefa Ortiz de Domínguez
February 9, 2016	San Luis Potosí	Mexico	El Domo
February 11, 2016	Monterrey	Mexico	Auditorio Banamex
February 12, 2016	Monterrey	Mexico	Auditorio Banamex
February 16, 2016	Mexico City	Mexico	National Auditorium
February 17, 2016	Mexico City	Mexico	National Auditorium
February 24, 2016	Viña del Mar	Chile	Quinta Vergara Amphitheater (Viña del Mar International Song Festival)
February 26, 2016	Santiago	Chile	Movistar Arena
March 1, 2016	Córdoba	Argentina	Orfeo Superdomo
March 3, 2016	Buenos Aires	Argentina	Estadio G.E.B.A.
March 5, 2016	Buenos Aires	Argentina	Estadio G.E.B.A.
April 27, 2016	Lima	Peru	Estadio Nacional de Lima
April 30, 2016	Arequipa	Peru	Estadio Monumental de la UNSA
July 8, 2016	Barcelona	Spain	Palau Sant Jordi
July 11, 2016	Valencia	Spain	Plaza de Toros
July 14, 2016	Cartagena	Spain	Estadio Cartagenoba
July 21, 2016	San Sebastián	Spain	Dinastía Arena
July 26, 2016	Málaga	Spain	Palacio de los Deportes Martín Carpena
July 30, 2016	Jerez	Spain	Estadio Chapín
August 9, 2016	Marbella	Spain	Starlite Festival
December 5, 2016	Madrid	Spain	Palacio de los Deportes
December 6, 2016	Madrid	Spain	Palacio de los Deportes

== Band ==
- Mike Ciro - Musical Director and Guitar
- Alfonso Pérez - Piano, Keyboards and Vocal
- Nathaniel Townsley - Drums
- Bri (Brigitte) Sosa - Bass
- Sara Devine - Vocal
- Crystal "Rovel" Torres - Trumpet
- Glenda del E - Piano and Vocal
- Freddy "Fuego" González- Trombone
- Victor Mirallas - Saxophone and Clarinet
