= Grandes Éxitos 1991–2004 =

2004 compilation album

Greatest hits album by Alejandro Sanz
- Released: November 16, 2004
- Recorded: 1991–2004
- Genre: Latin pop
- Length: 60:13 (CD 1); 72:54 (CD 2); 64:18 (CD 3)
- Label: WEA Latina

Alejandro Sanz chronology
No Es lo Mismo (2001)	Grandes Éxitos 1991–2004 (2004)	El Tren de los Momentos (2006)

Singles from Grandes Éxitos 1991–2004
- 1. "Tú No Tienes Alma" Released: October 25, 2004

Professional ratings
Review scores
Source	Rating
Allmusic	4/5 stars

Grandes Éxitos 1991–2004 is the first greatest hits album from Spanish singer-songwriter Alejandro Sanz. The album assembles his previous hits in two CDs; the first contains songs from 1991 to 1996 of the albums Viviendo Deprisa, Si Tú Me Miras, Básico and 3 and the second the hits from 1997 to 2004 of the albums Más, El Alma al Aire, MTV Unplugged and No Es lo Mismo. For this album, Sanz recorded two new songs, the single "Tú No Tienes Alma" and "Cuando Sea Espacio".

This album comes in two editions; the first, called "Jewel Box", contains the two CDs mentioned above, and a second edition, called "Digipack", with an extra CD that includes demos, duets and material previously unreleased. From this selection of 14 rarities, stands out the demo of "Corazón Partío" to guitar and voice, recorded as it was conceived by Sanz before starting the recording of Más.

Complementing the release of the album, the DVD Los Videos 1991–2004 was released, which includes all Alejandro Sanz's music videos up-to-date with additional content.

== Track listing ==
All tracks are written by Sanz, unless specified.

CD 1: 1991–1996
No.	Title	Writer(s)	Composer	Length
1.	"Mi Soledad y Yo"			4:57
2.	"Tú No Tienes Alma" (unpublished)			4:03
3.	"La Fuerza del Corazón"			5:05
4.	"¿Lo Ves?"			3:48
5.	"Quiero Morir en tu Veneno"	Sanz; Adolfo Rubio; D'Romy Ledo		4:02
6.	"Tu Letra Podré Acariciar"			3:32
7.	"Si Tú Me Miras"			4:02
8.	"Mi Primera Canción"			5:49
9.	"Como Te Echo de Menos"			4:00
10.	"Pisando Fuerte"			4:28
11.	"Viviendo Deprisa"			3:17
12.	"Lo Que Fui Es Lo Que Soy"			4:40
13.	"Los Dos Cogidos de la Mano"			5:02
14.	"Se Le Apagó La Luz"			4:46
15.	"Cuando Sea Espacio" (unpublished)		Lulo Pérez	2:10
Total length:				63:41

All tracks are written by Sanz.

CD 2: 1997–2004
No.	Title	Length
1.	"Y, ¿Si Fuera Ella?"	5:23
2.	"Tú No Tienes Alma"	3:58
3.	"Corazón Partío"	5:43
4.	"Amiga Mía"	4:50
5.	"Aquello Que Me Diste"	4:45
6.	"Cuando Nadie Me Ve"	5:08
7.	"El Alma al Aire"	5:56
8.	"Quisiera Ser"	5:28
9.	"Hay un Universo de Pequeñas Cosas"	5:21
10.	"Y Solo Se Me Ocurre Amarte"	4:37
11.	"Aprendiz"	5:00
12.	"No Es Lo Mismo"	5:59
13.	"Regálame la Silla Donde Te Esperé"	4:50
14.	"Eso"	4:23
15.	"Try to Save Your Song"	3:43
Total length:		75:04

All tracks are written by Sanz, unless specified.

CD 3: Rarezas "Digipack"
No.	Title	Writer(s)	Performed with	Length
1.	"Corazón Partío (demo)"			4:11
2.	"Es Algo Personal (demo)"			4:09
3.	"Cuando Nadie Me Ve (demo)"			5:00
4.	"Hay Un Universo de Pequeñas Cosas (demo)"			5:29
5.	"Seremos Libres (demo)"			4:45
6.	"Dale al Aire"	Antonio Carmona; Sanz	Juan Habichuela; Ketama	3:46
7.	"La Vida es Un Espejo"	Juan Manuel Cañizares; Pepe de Lucía	Pepe de Lucía	4:16
8.	"Caí"		Niña Pastori	5:12
9.	"Adoro"	Armando Manzanero	Armando Manzanero	4:22
10.	"The Hardest Day"	Andrea Corr; Sanz	The Corrs	4:41
11.	"Eso"		Omara Portuondo	4:18
12.	"Grande"	Eric Buffat; Beppe Dati; Sanz; Telonio; Paolo Vallesi	Paolo Vallesi	4:56
13.	"Me Vestí de Silencio"			3:58
14.	"Canción de Amor Para Olvidarte"	Ryo Aska; Sanz		5:15
Total length:				64:18

== Personnel ==
=== CD 1: 1991–1996 ===
==== "Tú No Tienes Alma" ====
- Alejandro Sanz – vocals, arrangement
- Lulo Pérez – arrangement, programming, piano, keyboards, strings arrangements, chorus
- Vinnie Colaiuta – drums
- Jimmy Haslip – bass
- Michael Landau – electric guitar
- Wendy Pederson – chorus
- Eddie Thomas – chorus
- Miami Symphonic Strings – orchestra

==== "Cuando Sea Espacio" ====
- Alejandro Sanz – vocals
- Lulo Pérez – arrangement, programming, piano, keyboards, synth bass, strings arrangements
- Luis Dulzaides – percussion
- Miami Symphonic Strings – orchestra

==== Miami Symphonic Strings ====
- Violins – Alfredo Oliva (concertmaster), Scott Flavin, Mei Mei Luo, Joan Faigen, Glen Basham, Orlando Forte, Laslo Pap, Carole Cole, Huifang Chen, Tina Raimondi, Kurt Coble, Yein Hung, John DiPuccio, Mariusz Wojtowicz, Dina Kostic
- Violas – Scott O'Donnell, Michael McClelland, Debra Spring, Viera Borisova, Bernard Vallandingham
- Cellos – Chris Glansdorp, David Cole, Susan Moyer, Yue Tang

==== Production ====
- Recording engineers – Oscar Vinader, Carlos Álvarez, Rafa Sardina
- Recording assistants – Miguel Galguera, Felipe Guevara, Javier Valverde, Alex Mesa, Pablo Eslava
- Mixing engineer – Rafa Sardina
- Mixing assistants – Kevin Szymansky, Tom Bender
- Mastering – Antonio Baglio, Claudio Giussani
- Mastering supervision – Emanuele Ruffinengo, Bob Benozzo

== Chart performance ==
=== Album ===
Year	Chart	Peak	Weeks on chart
2004	Billboard Latin Pop Albums	5	9
2004	Billboard Top Latin Albums	18	8
2004	Billboard Top Heatseekers	30	2

=== Singles ===
Year	Chart	Track	Peak	Weeks on chart
2004	Billboard Hot Latin Songs	Tú No Tienes Alma	18	10
2004	Billboard Latin Pop Airplay	Tú No Tienes Alma	12	14

== Awards ==
Year	Category	Title	Result
2005	Latin Grammy Award for Record of the Year	Tú No Tienes Alma	Won
2005	Latin Grammy Award for Song of the Year	Tú No Tienes Alma	Won

== Certifications ==
Region	Certification	Certified units/sales
Argentina (CAPIF)	Gold	20,000^{^}
Mexico (AMPROFON)	Gold	50,000^{^}
Spain (Promusicae)	3× Platinum	300,000^{^}
^{^} Shipments figures based on certification alone.
