= Amiga Mía =

Single by Alejandro Sanz

from the album Más
- Released: 1997
- Studio: Excalibur, Milan, Italy; Plastic, Rome, Italy; Sintonia, Madrid, Spain; Red Led, Madrid, Spain
- Genre: Rock
- Length: 4:46
- Label: WEA Latina
- Songwriter: Alejandro Sanz
- Producers: Miguel Angel Arenas; Emanuele Ruffinengo

Alejandro Sanz singles chronology
"Corazón Partío" (1997)	"Amiga Mía" (1997)	"Aquello Que Me Diste" (1998)

Music video
- "Amiga Mía" on YouTube

"Amiga Mía" (transl. "Female friend of mine") is a song by Spanish singer Alejandro Sanz from his fifth studio album, Más (1997). WEA Latina released it as the album's fourth single in the same year. The song was written by Sanz and produced by Miguel Angel Arenas and Emanuele Ruffinengo. The rock ballad carries a message of unrequited love and was inspired by a close friend of Sanz. The song received positive reactions from music critics who regarded it as one of his best songs. A music video for "Amiga Mía" features the artist performing on top of a building while the townspeople watch and his love interest leaves with her fiancé.

The song was a recipient of a Broadcast Music, Inc. (BMI) Latin Award in 1999. Commercially, the track at peaked at number two on the Billboard Hot Latin Songs chart in the United States, while also topping the Latin Pop Airplay chart in the US. "Amiga Mía" was included on the set list for the Más Tour and all subsequent tours. It has been covered by Natalia Jiménez and Joe King, with live renditions being performed by India Martínez and Luis Fonsi.

== Background and composition ==
"Amiga Mía"
A 28-second sample of "Amiga Mía". Mario Tarradell of The Dallas Morning News describes it as a ballad that "mix smooth melodies, his powderkeg singing style, flamenco guitar riffs and percussive beats that give the tunes an exotic feel".

Since the release of his first album with WEA Latina, Viviendo Deprisa (1991), Alejandro Sanz has a maintained popular following in his native Spain. The album, along with its follow-ups, Si Tú Me Miras (1993), Básico (1994), and 3 (1995), were successful in the country having been certified multi-platinum. The tracks in the records are characterized as romantic ballads. On 12 July 1997, Sanz announced that he had finished recording his next project, Más, which was recorded and mixed in Italy under the direction of Emanuelle Ruffinengo and Miguel Angel Arenas, who handled its production. The album was recorded at Excalibur in Milan, Plastic in Rome, Sintonia and Red Led in Madrid, Spain and was released on 9 September 1997. Sanz penned over 30 compositions, of which ten made it to the final release including "Amiga Mía".

"Amiga Mía" is a rock ballad that "treatises on loneliness, regrets and misery." The song narrates "the sad story of a person who was fixed on someone who did not correspond to his love". The composition was inspired by the experience of his close friend, Irene Chamorro, who was in love with Spanish musician Antonio Flores. Musically, it is accompanied by a flamenco guitar riff and "percussive beats". In the lyrics, he chants: "Amiga mía, lo sé, sólo vives por él que lo sabe también, pero él no te ve como yo" ("My friend, I know you only live for him, and he knows it too, but he doesn't see you like I do").

== Promotion and reception ==
"Amiga Mía" was released as the fourth single from Más in 1997. The music video for the song has Sanz singing on top of a building to a woman he loves as the townspeople watch and ends with the woman walking away with her fiancé. "Amiga Mía" was included on the artist's compilation albums Grandes Éxitos 1991–2004 (2004) and Colección Definitiva (2011). El Norte critic Devorah Davis regarded it as one of the album's two "sweeping ballads" along with "Y, ¿Si Fuera Ella?". Tarradell praised Sanz's "powderkeg" vocals and felt the instruments gave it an "exotic feel". The track was listed as one of the best Sanz's song by Esquire and Los 40.

The track was recognized as one of the best-performing songs of the year at the 1999 BMI Latin Awards. Commercially, "Amiga Mía" became the singer's first number one on the Billboard Latin Pop Airplay chart and peaked at number two on the Hot Latin Songs chart in the US.

== Live performances and covers ==
"Amiga Mía" was included on the set list for the Más (1998–99), El Alma Al Aire (2001–02), No Es Lo Mismo (2004), El Tren De Los Momentos (2007–08), Paraiso (2009–11), La Música No Se Toca (2012–14), and #LaGira (2019) tours. An acoustic rendition of the song was performed for a live audience and recorded for the album, MTV Unplugged (2001). To commemorate the 20th anniversary of Más, Sanz held a concert at the Vicente Calderón Stadium in Madrid, Spain on 24 June 2017, where he presented the songs from the album live with musical guests, including "Amiga Mía" with Spanish musician India Martínez.

Spanish singer Natalia Jiménez covered "Amiga Mía" on the album, ¿Y Si Fueran Ellas? (2013), a collection of Sanz's songs recorded by female artists. Puerto Rican artist Joe King recorded a salsa version of the track on his disc, Corazón Partío (1999), which AllMusic's Eugene Chadbourne described as "friendly if possessive". King's rendition peaked at number 33 and 16 on the Hot Latin Songs and Tropical Airplay charts, respectively. As part of the Latin Recording Academy tribute to Sanz, who was presented with the Person of the Year accolade in 2017, Puerto Rican musician Luis Fonsi performed "Amiga Mía" live where he was accompanied by a violin section.

== Personnel ==
Credits adapted from the Más liner notes.

- Miguel Angel Arena – producer
- Joan Bibiloni – acoustic guitar
- Paolo Costa – bass guitar
- Luca Jurman – chorus
- Lele Melotti – drums
- Saverio Porciello – acoustic guitar
- Paola Repele – chorus
- Elena Roggero – chorus
- Emanuele Ruffinengo – piano, keyboards, programmer, producer
- Alejandro Sanz – vocals, songwriting
- Ludovico Vagnone – electric guitar

== Charts ==
Chart performance for "Amiga Mía"
Chart (1998)	Peak position
US Hot Latin Songs (Billboard)	2
US Latin Pop Airplay (Billboard)	1

Chart performance for Joe King's version
Chart (1998)	Peak position
US Hot Latin Songs (Billboard)	33
US Tropical Airplay (Billboard)	16

== See also ==
- List of Billboard Latin Pop Airplay number ones of 1998
