= Lo Esencial de... Alejandro Sanz =

Compilation album by Alejandro Sanz
- Released: November 20, 2001
- Recorded: 1990–1997
- Genre: Latin pop
- Length: 42:10 (CD1); 49:55 (CD2); 51:01 (CD3)
- Label: Warner Music Latina

Alejandro Sanz chronology
El Alma al Aire (2000)	Lo Esencial de... Alejandro Sanz (2001)	MTV Unplugged (2001)

Professional ratings
Review scores
Source	Rating
Allmusic	3/5 stars

Lo Esencial de... Alejandro Sanz is a triple album that contains Alejandro Sanz's albums Viviendo Deprisa, 3 and Más. For some reason, it doesn't include the album Si Tú Me Miras, which was released between Viviendo Deprisa and 3.

== Track listing ==
=== CD1 (Viviendo Deprisa) ===
1. Los Dos Cogidos de la Mano - 5:02
2. Pisando Fuerte - 4:28
3. Lo Que Fui Es lo Que Soy - 4:40
4. Todo Sigue Igual - 5:13
5. Viviendo Deprisa - 3:17
6. Se Le Apagó la Luz - 4:46
7. Duelo al Amanecer - 3:31
8. Completamente Loca - 3:32
9. Toca Para Mi - 4:07
10. Es Este Amor - 3:34

=== CD2 (3) ===
1. La Fuerza del Corazón - 5:05
2. Por Bandera - 4:59
3. Mi Soledad y Yo - 4:57
4. Ellos Son Así - 4:39
5. Quiero Morir en Tu Veneno (D'Romy Ledo, Adolfo Rubio, Alejandro Sanz) - 4:02
6. ¿Lo Ves? - 3:48
7. Canción Sin Emoción - 4:48
8. Eres Mía - 5:25
9. Ese Que Me Dio Vida - 3:58
10. Se Me Olvidó Todo al Verte - 4:39
11. ¿Lo Ves? (piano y voz) - 3:35

=== CD3 (Más) ===
1. Y ¿Si Fuera Ella? - 5:22
2. Ese Último Momento - 5:04
3. Corazón Partío - 5:46
4. Siempre Es de Noche - 4:47
5. La Margarita Dijo No - 4:52
6. Hoy Que No Estás - 5:10
7. Un Charquito de Estrellas - 4:50
8. Amiga Mía - 4:48
9. Si Hay Dios... - 5:36
10. Aquello Que Me Diste - 4:46
