= Discografía Completa: Edición Especial Gira 98 =

Compilation album by Alejandro Sanz
- Released: 1998
- Recorded: 1990–1997
- Genre: Latin pop
- Length: 42:10 (CD1); 41:19 (CD2); 49:55 (CD3); 51:01 (CD4)
- Label: Warner Music Latina

Alejandro Sanz chronology
| Más (1997) | Discografía Completa: Edición Especial Gira 98 (1998) | El Alma al Aire (2000) |

Discografía Completa: Edición Especial Gira 98 is a quadruple album that contains Alejandro Sanz's previous albums, it was edited for the 1998 Tour Más.

== Track listing ==
=== CD1 (Viviendo Deprisa) ===
1. Los Dos Cogidos de la Mano - 5:02
2. Pisando Fuerte - 4:28
3. Lo Que Fui Es lo Que Soy - 4:40
4. Todo Sigue Igual - 5:13
5. Viviendo Deprisa - 3:17
6. Se Le Apagó la Luz - 4:46
7. Duelo al Amanecer - 3:31
8. Completamente Loca - 3:32
9. Toca Para Mi - 4:07
10. Es Este Amor - 3:34

=== CD2 (Si Tú Me Miras) ===
1. Si Tú Me Miras - 4:14
2. Tu Letra Podré Acariciar - 3:34
3. El Escaparate - 4:46
4. Cómo Te Echo de Menos - 4:00
5. Cuando Acabas Tú - 4:01
6. Mi Primera Canción - 4:36
7. Vente al Más Allá - 3:56
8. Qué No Te Daría Yo - 3:34
9. Este Pobre Mortal - 3:36
10. A Golpes Contra el Calendario - 5:02

=== CD3 (3) ===
1. La Fuerza del Corazón - 5:05
2. Por Bandera - 4:59
3. Mi Soledad y Yo - 4:57
4. Ellos Son Así - 4:39
5. Quiero Morir en Tu Veneno (D'Romy Ledo, Adolfo Rubio, Alejandro Sanz) - 4:02
6. ¿Lo Ves? - 3:48
7. Canción Sin Emoción - 4:48
8. Eres Mía - 5:25
9. Ese Que Me Dio Vida - 3:58
10. Se Me Olvidó Todo al Verte - 4:39
11. ¿Lo Ves? (piano y voz) - 3:35

=== CD4 (Más) ===
1. Y, ¿Si Fuera Ella? - 5:22
2. Ese Último Momento - 5:04
3. Corazón Partío - 5:46
4. Siempre Es de Noche - 4:47
5. La Margarita Dijo No - 4:52
6. Hoy Que No Estás - 5:10
7. Un Charquito de Estrellas - 4:50
8. Amiga Mía - 4:48
9. Si Hay Dios... - 5:36
10. Aquello Que Me Diste - 4:46

== Album certifications ==
| Region | Certification | Certified units/sales |
|---|---|---|
| Argentina (CAPIF) | Platinum | 60,000^{^} |
^{^} Shipments figures based on certification alone.
