= Estadio Osvaldo Domínguez Dibb =

Stadium in Asunción, Paraguay

Coordinates: 25°17′29″S 57°36′31″W

Estadio Osvaldo Dominguez Dibb
- El Bosque de Para Uno
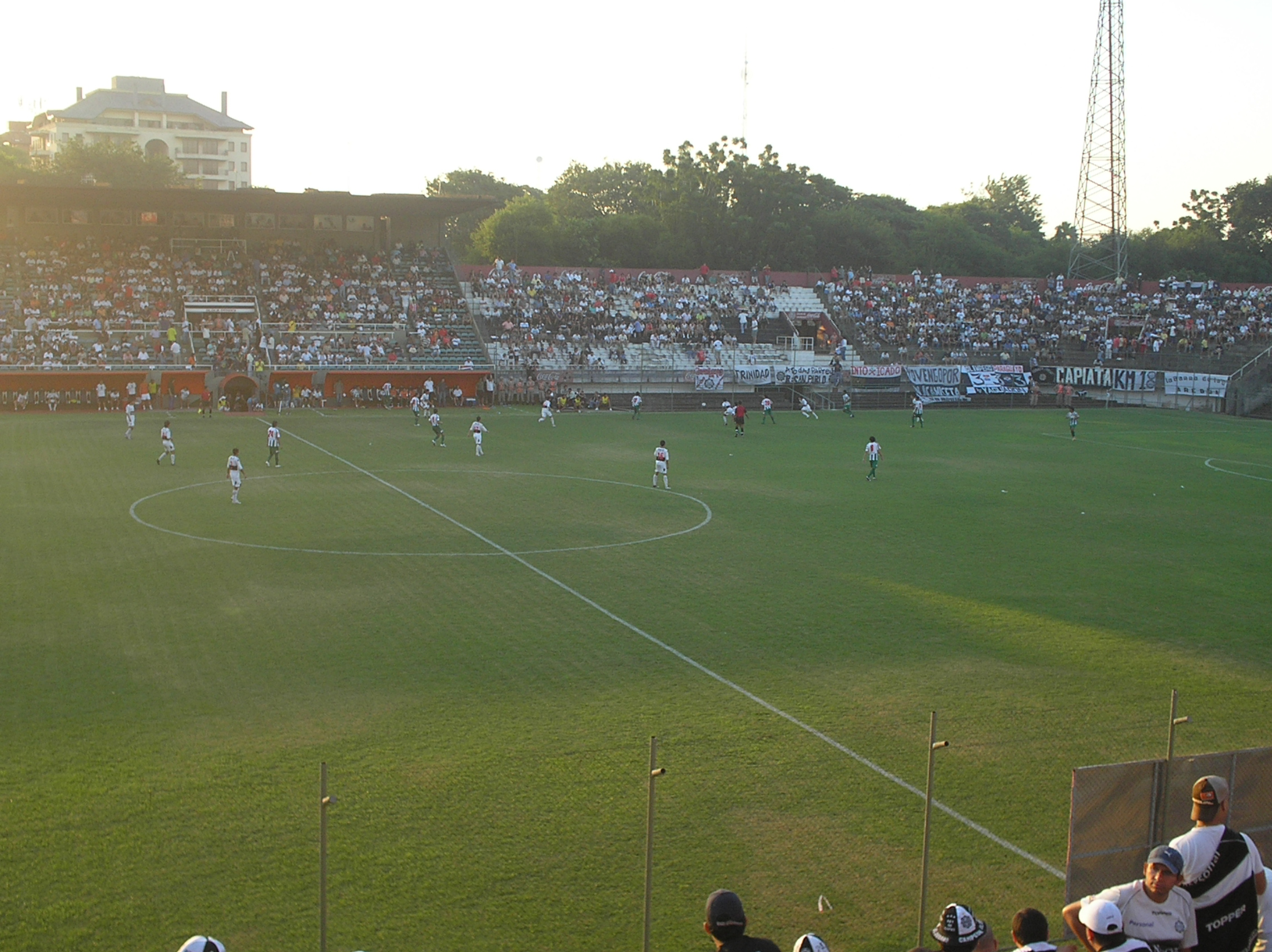
- Interactive map of Estadio Osvaldo Dominguez Dibb
- Full name: Estadio ueno Osvaldo Dominguez Dibb
- Owner: Club Olimpia
- Capacity: 32,000
- Surface: Grass
- Field size: 104 x 68 m

Construction
- Built: 1964
- Opened: 15 May 1965
- Renovated: 2024, 2026

Tenant
- Club Olimpia (1965–present)

The Estadio Osvaldo Domínguez Dibb, officially known Estadio ueno Osvaldo Domínguez Dibb due to sponsorship, is a football stadium in Asunción, Paraguay. It is the home venue of Club Olimpia and is named after former club president Osvaldo Domínguez Dibb.

The stadium was opened in May 1965 with a friendly match between Olimpia and Santos FC of Brazil, whose team included Pelé. The excitement to see Pelé playing was so great that the stadium's capacity was exceeded. During the game, one of the fences supporting the crowd in the stands broke, and many people were injured. As soon as the incident happened, Pelé ran and jumped over the fence to help the injured people. Only minor injuries occurred, and the match proceeded, ending in a 2–2 draw.

Though the stadium is the home ground of Club Olimpia, the Defensores del Chaco stadium is used for major derbies against their rivals such as Cerro Porteño because of its greater capacity.

The stadium is nicknamed "The Forest of Stop One" on account of its surroundings constituting large, tall trees, and the location having been the first stop of a now defunct Paraguayan train.

In 2024, a complete demolition of the stadium had begun. A completely new stadium will be built on the original site for the purpose of hosting one of the centenary matches of the 2030 FIFA World Cup. The new stadium will be completed by 2027, and will have a capacity of 46,000.

== Concerts ==
Date	Artist	Tour
April 5, 1994	(Italy) Eros Ramazzotti	Tutte Storie World Tour
February 2, 2007	(Guatemala) Ricardo Arjona	Gira Adentro
February 24, 2007	(Puerto Rico) Don Omar	King of Kings World Tour
March 1, 2008	(Puerto Rico) Chayanne	Mi Tiempo Tour
April 30, 2008	(Dominican Republic) (United States) Aventura	Corazoncito World Tour
September 20, 2008	(Puerto Rico) Wisin & Yandel	Los Extraterrestres World Tour
October 24, 2008	(Puerto Rico) Daddy Yankee	The Big Boss Tour
August 29, 2009	(Puerto Rico) Wisin & Yandel	La Revolución World Tour
March 27, 2010	(Spain) Alejandro Sanz	Paraiso Tour
April 27, 2013	(Guatemala) Ricardo Arjona	Metamorfosis World Tour
June 8, 2013	(Mexico) Marco Antonio Solís	Una Noche de Luna Tour
October 3, 2014	(Guatemala) Ricardo Arjona	Viaje Tour
February 18, 2016	(Mexico) Maná	Cama incendiada Tour
April 24, 2016	(Spain) Alejandro Sanz	Sirope Tour

== See also ==
- Club Olimpia
- List of football stadiums in Paraguay
- List of association football stadiums by capacity
- Lists of stadiums
