= List of best-selling albums in Spain =

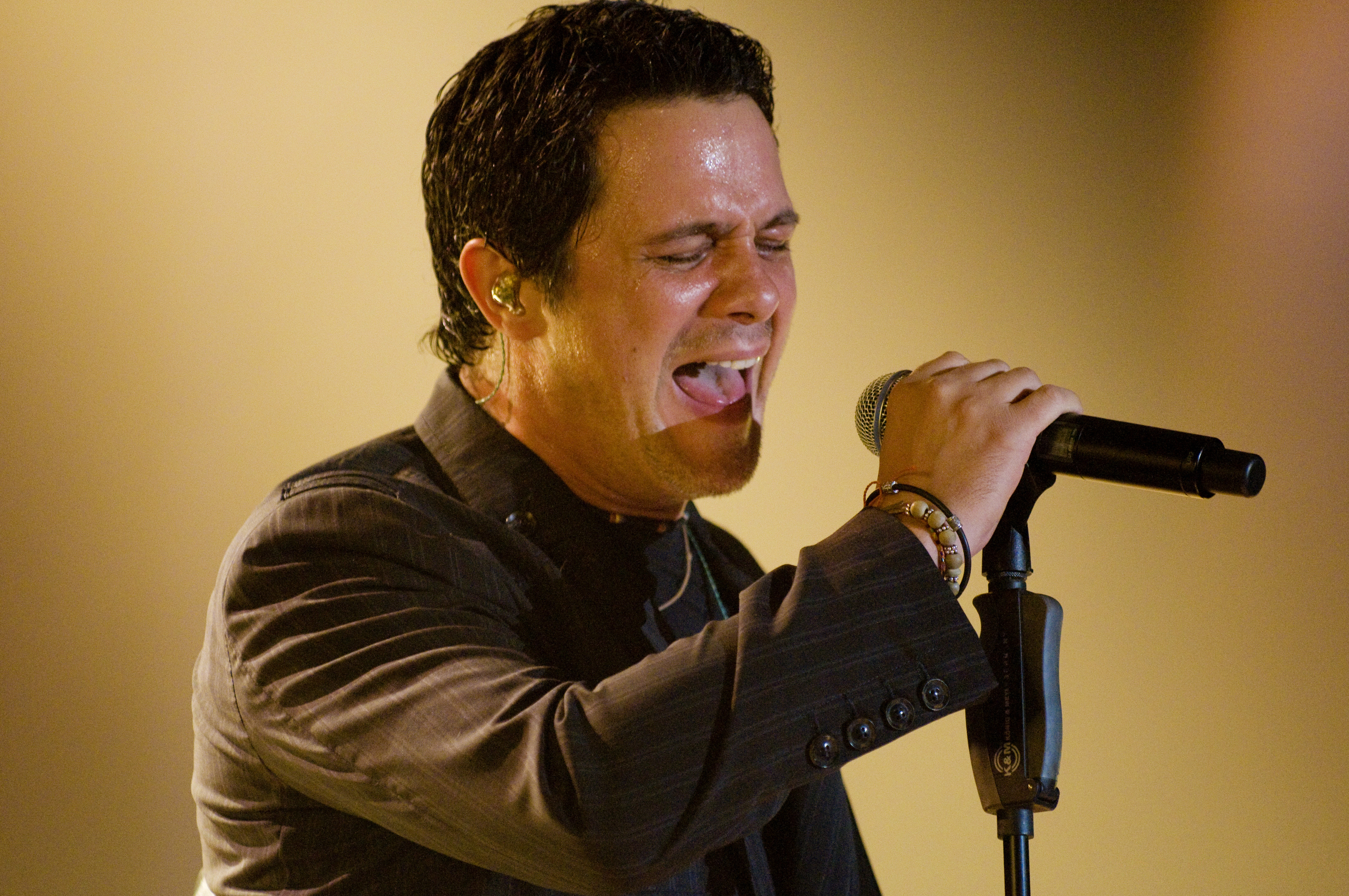
Alejandro Sanz is the artist with more entries in the list, with Más, El Alma al Aire, Viviendo Deprisa, 3 and No Es lo Mismo.

This is a list of the best-selling albums in Spain that have been certified by the Productores de Música de España (PROMUSICAE). PROMUSICAE is in charge of certifying records in Spain. Until October 2005, the certification levels for albums in Spain were 50,000 for Gold and 100,000 for Platinum. The current levels, however, are 20,000 for Gold and 40,000 for Platinum.

Of the 20 best selling albums in Spain, Spanish artists dominate the list with fourteen entries. Two Italian artists and one artist each from the United Kingdom, United States, Cuba and Mexico complete the list. Four acts - Alejandro Sanz, La Oreja de Van Gogh, Mecano, and David Bisbal - appear more than once in the list.

Alejandro Sanz tops the list with his fifth album Más, selling around 2.2 million copies in the country and being certified 22 times. The best-selling non-Spanish language album in Spain is Spice by Spice Girls, which sold 1 million copies.

== Best-selling albums of all-time in Spain ==
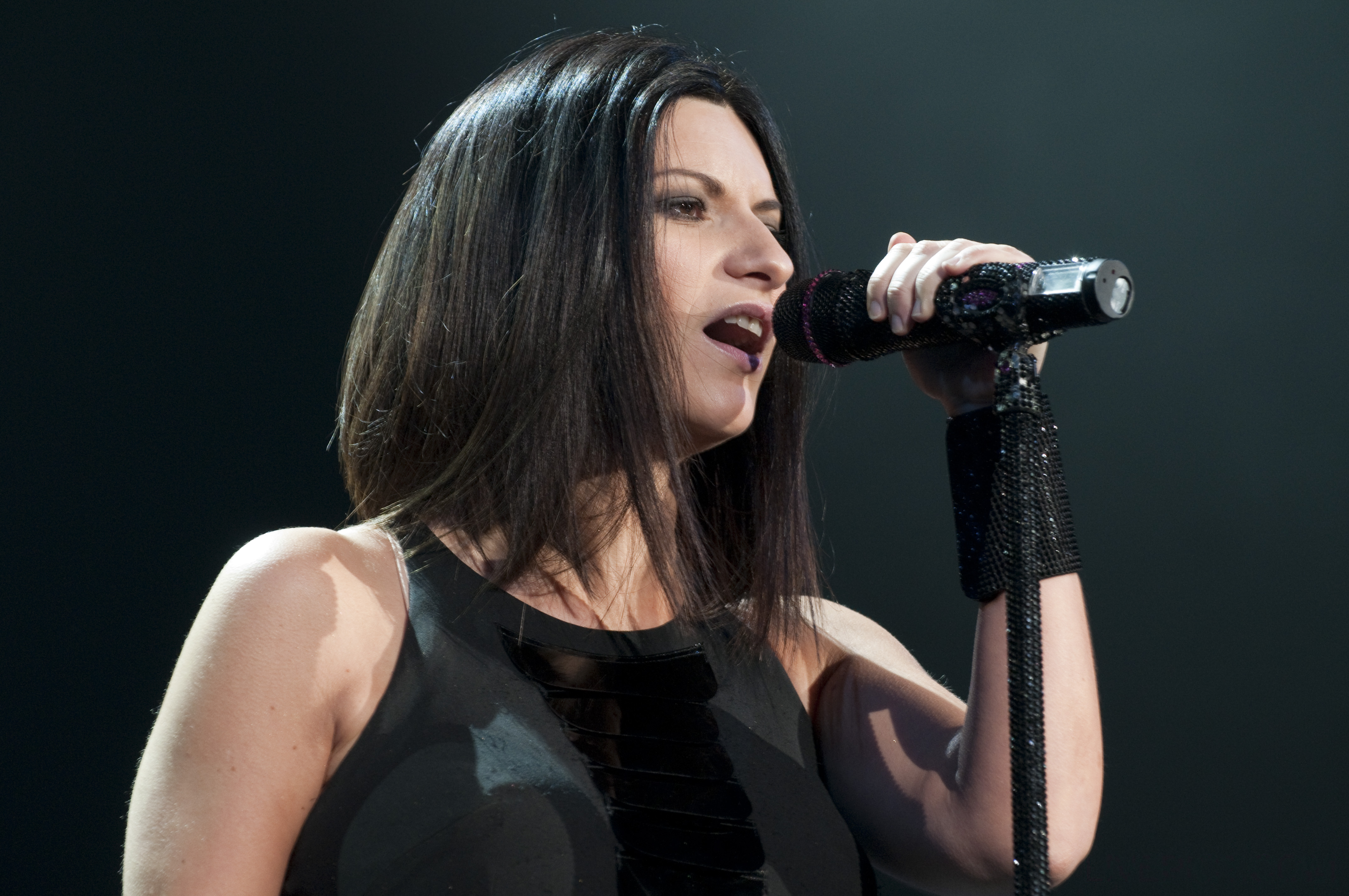
Laura Pausini had one of the best selling album in Spain by a foreign artist with her homonymous album Laura Pausini.

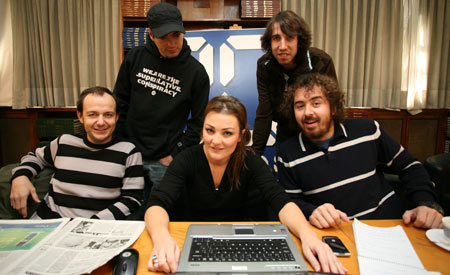
Spanish groups Mecano and La Oreja de Van Gogh (pictured) are tied as the bands with the most entries, both with two.

The following are the top best-selling albums in Spain based in certifications from PROMUSICAE. Spanish artists are in bold.

Year	Artist	Album	Certification	Sales	Sources
1997	**Alejandro Sanz**	**Más**	22× Platinum	2,200,000	
2000	**Alejandro Sanz**	**El Alma al Aire**	13× Platinum	1,300,000	
2002	**David Bisbal**	**Corazón latino**	13× Platinum	1,300,000	
1994	Laura Pausini	Laura Pausini	11× Platinum	1,300,000	
1990	The Three Tenors	Carreras Domingo Pavarotti in Concert (Note: Year-end sales according to El País. Platinum for a classical album before 1999, was equivalent to 25,000 units.)	14× Platinum	1,200,000	
2001	**Operacion Triunfo**	Album	12× Platinum	1,200,000	
1988	**Mecano**	**Descanso Dominical**	11× Platinum	1,200,000	
2000	**La Oreja de Van Gogh**	**El viaje de Copperpot**	11× Platinum	1,200,000	
1989	**Julio Iglesias**	**Raíces**	11× Platinum	1,100,000	
1996	**Rosana**	**Lunas Rotas**	11× Platinum	1,100,000	
1999	**Estopa**	**Estopa**	11× Platinum	1,100,000	
1993	**Mecano**	**Aidalai**	10× Platinum	1,000,000	
1993	Gloria Estefan	Mi Tierra	10× Platinum	1,000,000	
1997	**Mónica Naranjo**	**Palabra de Mujer**	10× Platinum	1,000,000	
2004	**David Bisbal**	**Bulería**	10× Platinum	1,000,000	
1997	Spice Girls	Spice	10× Platinum	1,000,000	
1997	Luis Miguel	Romances	9× Platinum	1,000,000	
1990	Juan Luis Guerra	Bachata Rosa	7× Platinum	1,000,000	
1980	**Julio Iglesias**	**Hey**	5× Platinum	1,000,000	
2001	**Álex Ubago**	**¿Qué pides tú?**	9× Platinum	900,000	
1990	**Alejandro Sanz**	**Viviendo Deprisa**	9× Platinum	900,000	
2003	**Alejandro Sanz**	**No Es lo Mismo**	8× Platinum	800,000	
1997	Backstreet Boys	Backstreet's Back	8× Platinum	800,000	
1995	**Alejandro Sanz**	**3**	8× Platinum	800,000	
1989	Phil Collins	...But Seriously	7× Platinum	750,000	
1999	Luis Miguel	Amarte Es Un Placer	7× Platinum	700,000	
1998	**La Oreja de Van Gogh**	**Dile Al Sol**	7× Platinum	700,000	
1996	**Ella baila sola**	**Ella baila Sola**	7× Platinum	700,000	
1998	Chayanne	Atado a Tu Amor	7× Platinum	700,000	
2002	**Amaral**	**Estrella de mar**	7× Platinum	700,000	
2002	**David Bustamante**	**Bustamante**	7× Platinum	700,000	
1993	**El Último de la Fila**	**Astronomía razonable**	7× Platinum	700,000	
2002	**Operacion Triunfo**	Canta Disney	7× Platinum	700,000	

== See also ==
- Productores de Música de España
- List of best-selling singles in Spain
- List of best-selling albums
