= Paraiso Tour =

2009–11 concert tour by Alejandro Sanz

- World tour by Alejandro Sanz
- Associated album: Paraíso Express
- Start date: November 25, 2009
- End date: March 6, 2011
- Legs: 3
- No. of shows: 40 in Europe; 39 in Latin America; 14 in North America; 93 total

Alejandro Sanz concert chronology
- El Tren De Los Momentos Tour (2007–2008); Paraiso Tour (2009–2011); La Musica No Se Toca Tour (2012–2013)

The Paraiso Tour is a concert tour by Spanish singer Alejandro Sanz to promote his album Paraíso Express.

== Tour set list ==
1. Mi Peter Punk
2. Viviendo Deprisa
3. Lo Que Fui Es lo Que Soy
4. Desde Cuándo
5. Nuestro Amor Será Leyenda
6. Se le Apagó la Luz
7. Cuando Nadie Me Ve
8. Corazón Partío
9. Yo Hice Llorar Hasta a Los Ángeles
10. Si Hay Dios...
11. Sin Que Se Note
12. Lola Soledad
13. Quisiera Ser
14. Y, ¿Si Fuera Ella?
15. Looking For Paradise
16. Yo Sé lo Que la Gente Piensa
17. ¿Lo Ves?
18. Tú No Tienes la Culpa
19. Tu Letra Podré Acariciar
20. Aquello Que Me Diste
21. A la Primera Persona
22. Mi Soledad y Yo
23. Amiga Mía
24. No Es lo Mismo

== Tour dates ==
Date	City	Country	Venue
Europe I
November 25, 2009	Madrid	Spain	Teatro Compac Gran Via
November 26, 2009	Madrid	Spain	Teatro Compac Gran Via
November 28, 2009	Madrid	Spain	Teatro Compac Gran Via
November 29, 2009	Madrid	Spain	Teatro Compac Gran Via
December 1, 2009	Madrid	Spain	Teatro Compac Gran Via
December 2, 2009	Madrid	Spain	Teatro Compac Gran Via
December 4, 2009	Madrid	Spain	Teatro Compac Gran Via
December 5, 2009	Madrid	Spain	Teatro Compac Gran Via
North America I
December 11, 2009	Las Vegas	United States	House of Blues
Latin America I
February 23, 2010	Mexico City	Mexico	National Auditorium
February 24, 2010	Mexico City	Mexico	National Auditorium
February 26, 2010	Mexico City	Mexico	National Auditorium
February 27, 2010	Mexico City	Mexico	National Auditorium
March 2, 2010	León	Mexico	Poliforum León
March 4, 2010	Guadalajara	Mexico	Estadio Tres de Marzo
March 6, 2010	Monterrey	Mexico	Monterrey Arena
March 7, 2010	Monterrey	Mexico	Monterrey Arena
March 10, 2010	Mérida	Mexico	Complejo deportivo La Inalámbrica
March 12, 2010	Mexico City	Mexico	National Auditorium
March 13, 2010	Mexico City	Mexico	National Auditorium
March 17, 2010	Santiago	Chile	Movistar Arena
March 18, 2010	Santiago	Chile	Movistar Arena
March 20, 2010	Buenos Aires	Argentina	Estadio de Velez
March 23, 2010	Córdoba	Argentina	Orfeo Superdomo
March 25, 2010	Corrientes	Argentina	Club Huracan Corrinetes
March 27, 2010	Asunción	Paraguay	Estadio Olimpia
April 9, 2010	Zacatecas	Mexico	Plaza de armas Festival cultural Zacatecas
Europe II
May 1, 2010	Córdoba	Spain	Plaza de Toros de los Califas
May 5, 2010	Madrid	Spain	Palacio de los Deportes
May 6, 2010	Madrid	Spain	Palacio de los Deportes
May 8, 2010	Valladolid	Spain	Feria de Valladolid
May 12, 2010	Barcelona	Spain	Palau Sant Jordi
May 14, 2010	Bilbao	Spain	Bilbao Exhibition Centre
May 15, 2010	Pamplona	Spain	Recinto Ferial de Navarra
May 21, 2010	A Coruña	Spain	Coliseum da Coruña
May 22, 2010	Vigo	Spain	Instituto Ferial de Vigo
May 26, 2010	Mérida	Spain	Albergue Juvenil El Prado
May 28, 2010	Granada	Spain	Coliseo Atarfe
May 29, 2010	Puertollano	Spain	Plaza de Toros
June 2, 2010	Gandia	Spain	Patio del instituto María Enríquez
June 4, 2010	Orihuela	Spain	Los Huertos
June 5, 2010	Murcia	Spain	Plaza de toros de La Condomina
June 8, 2010	Palma de Mallorca	Spain	Palma Arena
June 10, 2010	Seville	Spain	Estadio Olímpico de Sevilla
June 12, 2010	Málaga	Spain	Pista de Atletismo
North America II
July 15, 2010	Highland	United States	San Manuel Indian Bingo
July 16, 2010	Santa Ynez	United States	Chumash Casino
July 18, 2010	San Jose	United States	HP Pavilion at San Jose
July 21, 2010	San Diego	United States	San Diego Sports Arena
July 23, 2010	Los Angeles	United States	Gibson Amphitheatre
July 24, 2010	Los Angeles	United States	Gibson Amphitheatre
July 28, 2010	Houston	United States	Verizon Wireless Theatre
July 29, 2010	Hidalgo	United States	State Farm Arena
July 31, 2010	Rosemont	United States	Rosemont Theatre
August 2, 2010	Washington, D.C.	United States	The Filene Center
August 5, 2010	New York City	United States	Radio City Music Hall
August 7, 2010	Miami	United States	American Airlines Arena
August 11, 2010	Orlando	United States	Bob Carr Performing Arts Centre
Latin America II
August 13, 2010	San Juan	Puerto Rico	Coliseo de Puerto Rico
August 15, 2010	Santo Domingo	Dominican Republic	Altos de Chavón
Europe III
August 24, 2010	Lanzarote	Spain	Ciudad Deportiva de Lanzarote
August 26, 2010	Las Palmas	Spain	Parking Estadio de Gran Canaria
August 28, 2010	Tenerife	Spain	Estadio de fútbol Adeje
August 31, 2010	Ourense	Spain	Expourense
September 2, 2010	Valencia	Spain	Auditorio Marina Norte
September 4, 2010	Alcalá de los Gazules	Spain	Campo de fútbol
September 8, 2010	Madrid	Spain	Palacio de los Deportes
September 11, 2010	Salou	Spain	Campo de fútbol
September 13, 2010	Cehegín	Spain	Complejo Deportivo Armarjal
September 15, 2010	Barcelona	Spain	Palau Sant Jordi
Septiembre 17, 2010	Zaragoza	Spain	Pabellón Príncipe Felipe
September 18, 2010	Almacelles	Spain	Sala Polivalent
September 23, 2010	Almería	Spain	Pabellón de Deportes de los Juegos del Mediterráneo
September 25, 2010	Ávila	Spain	Plaza de toros
Latin America III
October 17, 2010	Rio de Janeiro	Brazil	Citibank Hall
October 19, 2010	São Paulo	Brazil	Credicard Hall
October 21, 2010	Santa Cruz	Bolivia	Estadio Ramón Tahuichi Aguilera
October 23, 2010	Lima	Peru	Estadio Monumental
October 26, 2010	Guayaquil	Ecuador	Estadio Alberto Spencer
October 28, 2010	Quito	Ecuador	Coliseo General Rumiñahui
October 30, 2010	Guatemala City	Guatemala	Forum Mundo E
November 3, 2010	Tegucigalpa	Honduras	Estadio Chochi Sosa
November 6, 2010	San José	Costa Rica	Estadio Saprissa
November 9, 2010	Panama City	Panama	Figali Convention Center
November 16, 2010	Maracaibo	Venezuela	Palacio de Eventos
November 18, 2010	Valencia	Venezuela	Estadio Misael Delgado
November 20, 2010	Caracas	Venezuela	Estadio USB
February 26, 2011	Viña del Mar	Chile	Quinta Vergara Amphitheater 2011 Viña del Mar International Song Festival
February 28, 2011	Mendoza	Argentina	Estadio Gimnasia y Esgrima de mendoza
March 2, 2011	Buenos Aires	Argentina	Luna Park
March 3, 2011	Buenos Aires	Argentina	Luna Park
March 5, 2011	Buenos Aires	Argentina	Luna Park
March 6, 2011	Buenos Aires	Argentina	Luna Park

=== Box office score data (Billboard) ===
Venue	City	Tickets sold / Available	Gross revenue
Auditorio Nacional	Mexico city	55,289 / 58,098 (95%)	$2,620,330
Radio City Music Hall	New York City	5,398 / 5,818 (93%)	$485,080
Coliseo José Miguel Agrelot	Puerto Rico	6,912 / 6,947 (99%)	$580,740
Citibank Hall	Rio de Janeiro	2,000 / 2,626 (76%)	$234,549
Credicard Hall	São Paulo	3,283 / 3,631 (90%)	$359,289
Estadio Ricardo Saprissa	San Jose	12,251 / 17,500 (70%)	$671,236
Figali Convention Center	Panama City	3,769 / 5,000 (75%)	$347,725
Palacio de Eventos	Maracaibo	3,179 / 3,785 (84%)	$887,137
Estadio Misael Delgado	Valencia	5,042 / 9,000 (56%)	$918,015
Estadio de Futbol de la Universidad Simón Bolívar	Caracas	7,645 / 7,900 (97%)	$1,893,550
Total		104,768 / 120,305 (87%)	$8,997,651

== Band ==
- Alejandro sanz – Vocal and guitar
- Mike Ciro – Musical Director and guitar
- Alfonso Perez – Keyboards
- Charles Martin – Percussion
- Chris Hierro – Keyboards, Backing vocal
- Nathaniel Townsley – Drums
- Aramanda Sabal – Bass
- Jan Ozveren – Guitar
- Sara Devine – Backing vocal
- Txell Sust – Backing vocal
