= Estadio De Béisbol Veinte de Noviembre =

Stadium in San Luis Potosí, Mexico

20 November
- Interactive map of 20 November
- Full name: Estadio de Beisbol Veinte de Noviembre
- Location: San Luis Potosí, San Luis Potosí, Mexico
- Coordinates: 22°8′1.35″N 100°59′9.00″W
- Capacity: 6,500

Tenant
- Tuneros de San Luis Potosí

Estadio de Beisbol Veinte de Noviembre is a stadium in San Luis Potosí, San Luis Potosí, Mexico. It is primarily used for baseball, and is the home field of the San Luis Potosí Tuneros Mexican League baseball team. It holds 6,500 people. By now, it is also used for concerts and mass audience events. It is named to commemorate Día de la Revolución: 20 November 1910, which marked the start of the Mexican Revolution.
