= Los Chulos Son Pa' Cuidarlos =

Studio album by Alejandro Magno
- Released: 1989
- Recorded: 1988
- Genre: Flamenco, techno
- Length: 30:48
- Label: Hispavox
- Producer: Tino Azores; Miguel Ángel Arenas

Alejandro Sanz chronology
Los Chulos Son Pa' Cuidarlos (1989)	Viviendo Deprisa (1991)

Los Chulos Son Pa' Cuidarlos (English: The Handsome Are To Be Cared For) is the first album recorded by Spanish singer Alejandro Sanz, known then as Alejandro Magno, under the label Hispavox. The record, which fused flamenco and techno, was met with critical and commercial indifference, and today Sanz views the record to be "insignificant". However, the album is now considered to be a collector's item. In an attempt to promote Los Chulos Son Pa' Cuidarlos, he performed at strip clubs, playing short sets between acts. This proved to be unsuccessful and Sanz took a break from music, choosing to study business administration.

== Track listing ==
No.	Title	Writer(s)	Length
1.	"Los Chulos Son Pa' Cuidarlos"	J. Torres; Sagrario Deloina	2:50
2.	"Tomasa"	A. L. Arenas	2:54
3.	"El Apartamento"	Torres; Deloina	3:32
4.	"Se Busca un Lío"	Arenas	2:25
5.	"Doña Marina"	Torres; J. Alejandro; L. Tamora; J. L. Oliveros	3:35
6.	"Tom Sayer"	Alejandro Sánchez	3:00
7.	"Señor Papa"	Arenas	3:29
8.	"Cuando Navegamos"	Arenas	3:24
9.	"Micaela"	Arenas	2:50
10.	"Ajaulili"	Arenas	3:17
Total length:			30:48
