= Coliseo General Rumiñahui =

Indoor arena in Quito, Ecuador

- Interactive map of Coliseo General Rumiñahui
- Address: Av. Diego Ladrón de Guevara
- Location: Quito, Ecuador
- Coordinates: 0°12′48″S 78°29′24″W
- Owner: Concentración Deportiva de Pichincha
- Capacity: 16,750

Construction
- Opened: July 9, 1992
- Cost: US$17,396,230

Coliseo General Rumiñahui is an indoor sporting arena located in Quito, Ecuador. The capacity of the arena is 16,000 and is used mostly for basketball, volleyball and other sports. It was built on July 9, 1992. It is also used for music concerts and other events.

== Concerts and events ==
- Def Leppard - April 15, 1997
- Fiestas de Quito 2003 - I Encuentro Internacional de Cheerleaders - November 21–23, 2003 - 10h00
- Maná - April 10, 2003 and April 17, 2008
- Shakira - July 24, 1996, and December 2, 2006
- RBD - April 21, 2007 and December 12, 2008
- WWE SmackDown!/ECW - February 12, 2008
- Wisin & Yandel - April 30, 2008
- Jesus' Name Apostolic Church of Ecuador - Fiftieth Anniversary Celebration - August 28–30, 2009
- Backstreet Boys - March 8, 2011
- Roxette - April 19, 2012
- Laura Pausini - August 28, 2016
- Judas Priest - October 28, 2018
- Slayer - September 26, 2019
- Tini - August 31, 2022
- Soy Luna - November 14, 2026
