= Sirope =

Studio album by Alejandro Sanz
- Released: May 4, 2015
- Recorded: 2014–2015
- Genre: Latin pop
- Language: Spanish
- Label: Universal Music Spain
- Producers: Alejandro Sanz; Sebastián Krys

Alejandro Sanz chronology
La Música No Se Toca (2012)	Sirope (2015)	#ElDisco (2019)

Singles from Sirope
- 1. "Un Zombie a la Intemperie" Released: March 2, 2015; 2. "A Que No Me Dejas" Released: April 29, 2015; 3. "Capitán Tapón"

Sirope is the 11th studio album recorded by Spanish singer-songwriter Alejandro Sanz. It was produced by himself alongside Grammy award winner Sebastian Krys. It was released on May 4, 2015. Sirope earned nominations for Album of the Year and won for Best Contemporary Pop Vocal Album at the 16th Latin Grammy Awards. Sirope also received a nomination for Best Latin Pop Album at the 58th Annual Grammy Awards.

== Track listing ==
All tracks are written by Sanz.

No.	Title	Length
1.	"A Mí No Me Importa"	3:11
2.	"Capitán Tapón"	4:40
3.	"Pero Tú"	4:43
4.	"La Guarida Del Calor"	3:49
5.	"Tú La Necesitas"	4:12
6.	"Un Zombie a la Intemperie"	5:27
7.	"Todo Huele A Ti"	4:22
8.	"No Madura El Coco"	5:03
9.	"La Vida Que Respira"	4:50
10.	"Suena La Pelota" (feat. Juan Luis Guerra)	4:05
11.	"A Que No Me Dejas"	5:21
12.	"El Silencio De Los Cuervos"	4:35
13.	"El Club De La Verdad"	5:21
Total length:		59:39

== Personnel ==
A Mí No Me Importa

- Brendan Buckley – drums
- Paul Bushnell – bass
- Alejandro Sanz – nylon guitars, electric piano, programming
- David Levita – electric guitar
- Jeff Babko – keyboard
- Sarah Devine – chorus
- Dav Julca – chorus

Capitán Tapón

- Andrés Torres – drums
- Davey Faragher – bass
- Alex Bendaña – baby bass
- Dav Julca – acoustic guitar, additional arrangements
- David Levita – nylon guitar, electric guitar
- Pete Wallace – keyboard
- Alejandro Sanz – keyboards
- Jeff Babko – B3
- Matt Cappy – trumpet

Pero Tú

- Pete Thomas – drums
- Brendan Buckley – Tom Loop
- Davey Faragher – bass
- Alejandro Sanz – nylon guitar
- Dav Julca – acoustic guitar, chorus
- David Levita – electric guitar
- Pete Wallace – keyboards
- Sarah Devine – chorus

La Guarida del Calor

- Pete Thomas – drums
- Davey Faragher – bass
- Alejandro Sanz – acoustic guitar, acoustic bass, programming
- David Levita – electric guitar
- Jeff Babko – keyboards
- Dav Julca – chorus

Tú La Necesitas

- Lee Levin – drums
- Paul Bushnell – bass
- Alejandro Sanz – nylon guitar
- David Levita – acoustic guitar
- Jeff Babko – keyboard
- Dav Julca – chorus, additional arrangements
- Sebastián Krys

Un Zombie a la Intemperie

- Andrés Torres – drums
- Davey Faragher – bass
- David Levita – guitar
- Jeff Babko – keyboard

Todo Huele a Ti

- Pete Thomas – drums
- Davey Faragher – bass
- Alejandro Sanz – acoustic guitar, programming
- David Levita – electric guitar
- Jeff Babko – keyboard
- Sarah Devine – chorus
- Dav Julca – chorus
- Arturo Sandoval – trumpet

No Madura El Coco

- Lee Levin – drums
- Sal Cuevas – bass
- Alejandro Sanz – bass, nylon guitar, programming
- Miguel Ramirez – congas
- Yasmil Marrufo – cuatro, maracas
- David Levita – electric guitar
- Lulo Perez – piano
- Jeff Babko – keyboards
- Dav Julca – chorus
- Belen Zeta – guest vocalist
- Chabuco – guest vocalist
- Arturo Sandoval – trumpet

La Vida Que Respira

- Alejandro Sanz – programming
- Lee Levin – drums
- Davey Faragher – bass
- Dave Levita – acoustic guitar, electric guitar
- Dav Julca – acoustic guitar, chorus
- Jeff Babko – keyboard
- Sarah Devine – chorus

Suena La Pelota

- Pete Thomas – drums
- Davey Faragher – bass
- Alejandro Sanz – acoustic guitar, programming
- David Levita – electric guitars
- Pete Wallace – keyboards
- Jeff Babko – accordion
- Dav Julca – chorus

A Que No Me Dejas

- Lee Levin – drums
- Alex Bendaña – bass
- David Levita – guitars
- Jeff Babko – keyboards
- Pepe Carlos – accordion, guest mariachi arrangements
- Armando Ávila – guest mariachi arrangements
- Jorge Jiménez Baca – vihuela, guitar
- Jose Luis Ortega G. – guitarrón
- Francisco García – trumpet
- Garnelo Mariachi Ensemble – strings

El Silencio de los Cuervos

- Lee Levin – drums
- Davey Faragher – bass
- Dav Julca – acoustic guitars, additional arrangements, chorus
- David Levita – electric guitars
- Pete Wallace – keyboard
- Alejandro Sanz – chorus, programming
- Natasha Jeanne – guest vocalist
- "Hey Tú chorus": The Hunt Kids, The Zabala Kids, Manuela Sánchez, Alexander Sanchez, Ana Michavila, Lucia Vásquez

El Club de la Verdad

- Pete Thomas – drums
- Davey Faragher – bass
- Dave Levita – guitar
- Jeff Babko – keyboard
- Irene Díaz – guest vocalist

== Charts ==
=== Weekly charts ===
Chart (2015)	Peak position
Spanish Albums (Promusicae)	1
US Billboard 200	83
US Top Latin Albums (Billboard)	1
US Latin Pop Albums (Billboard)	1
Venezuelan Albums (Recordland)	10

=== Year-end charts ===
Chart (2015)	Position
Spanish Albums (PROMUSICAE)	1
US Top Latin Albums (Billboard)	36
Chart (2016)	Position
Spanish Albums (PROMUSICAE)	15

== Certifications ==
Region	Certification	Certified units/sales
Argentina (CAPIF)	Platinum	40,000^{^}
Chile	Gold	
Colombia	Gold	
Ecuador	Platinum	
Mexico (AMPROFON)	Platinum	60,000^{^}
Peru	Platinum	
Spain (Promusicae)	5× Platinum	200,000^{‡}
^{^} Shipments figures based on certification alone.^{‡} Sales+streaming figures based on certification alone.

== See also ==
- List of number-one albums of 2015 (Spain)
- List of number-one Billboard Latin Albums from the 2010s
