= Starlite Festival =

Spanish international music festival

Starlite Festival is an international music festival held in a natural outdoor space inside the quarry of Nagüeles, in Marbella, Spain.

Starlite Festival's daily programme includes music, fashion, art, film and gastronomy; it is held every day for a month with shows at the only club in the world inside a quarry. Its auditorium seats 2,200.In addition, Starlite dedicates one night to philanthropy, celebrating Starlite Gala hosted by Antonio Banderas, which has become the largest charity event in Spain.

The festival has brought together over one hundred public figures, including political figures, intellectuals, athletes and celebrities, positioning it as one of the most significant social events of the country.

The international press has described it as one of the most important festivals of Europe, being compared to the Monte-Carlo Sporting Summer Festival.

== History ==
In 1983, prince Alfonso von Hohenlohe, singer Julio Iglesias and tenor Plácido Domingo organized a musical event with a recital starred by the tenor in the Nagüeles quarry in Marbella, using the space as a natural auditorium for its excellent acoustic qualities and natural environment. It was the historical precedent and precursor of the Starlite Festival, which finally took shape thirty years later, in 2012.

Emerging around the Starlite Gala, the festival was founded by Sandra Garcia-Sanjuan and Ignacio Maluquer in 2012, holding its first event from 13 July to 14 August.

== Awards and recognition ==
Starlite has become the largest leisure and tourism business in the Costa del Sol area. The event began a partnership with Marca España, and has been supported as a cultural event.

Carlos Espinosa de los Monteros, the high commissioner of the government for Marca España, emphasized the value of Starlite in terms of promotion and as a tourist attraction. "Starlite brings quality, experience and well known music figures and all this translates into a focus of attention in which we want to be present as Marca España", he stated.

In 2014, the festival was chosen as the best tourism initiative of Málaga for the El Caminante prize awarded by the newspaper El Mundo. The award was given on 2 April in the Edgar Neville Auditorium of the Council of Malaga.

== Events ==
=== 2012 ===
George Benson opened the stage on 13 July, which was followed by other concerts in the following month.

Over 40,000 people attended the festival the first year, which featured shows with dancers as well as music and cuisine from El Bulli, catered by Paco Roncero.

The following concerts were held:

- 14 July 2012: George Benson
- 16 July 2012: Roger Hodgson
- 21 July 2012: Armando Manzanero
- 22 July 2012: Tony Bennett
- 27 July 2012: Christopher Cross
- 29 July 2012: Hugh Laurie
- 30 July 2012: Paul Anka
- 2 August 2012: Miguel Bosé
- 3 August 2012: Rosario Flores and Lolita Flores with Antonio Carmona
- 4 August 2012: Starlite Gala
- 9 August 2012: Simple Minds
- 11 August 2012: Raphael
- 12 August 2012: Julio Iglesias
- 14 August 2012: Estopa

=== 2013 ===
The festival's second year began on 23 July and was packed with new activities. Besides the variety of concerts, clubs and restaurants, Starlite 2013 added a daily schedule of themed parties, fashion shows, film premieres and art exhibitions.

More than 60,000 people had the opportunity to see shows by Roko accompanied by the Starlite dance troupe, preview movies like World War Z by Brad Pitt, Jordi Molla's and El Hombre de Negro's art exhibitions and a fashion show featuring Cosmic Girls, with Laura Sánchez, Malena Costa and others.

The following concerts were held:

- 24 July 2013: Bryan Adams
- 27 July 2013: Jamie Cullum
- 28 July 2013: Noa
- 2 August 2013: Una noche movida, a concert featuring Nacho García Vega (Nacha Pop), Alejo Stivel (Tequila), Nacho Campillo (Tam Tam Go) and Rafa Sánchez (La Unión) played with Hombres G
- 3 August 2013: Julio Iglesias
- 5 August 2013: Buena Vista Social Club, with Omara Portuondo and Eliades Ochoa.
- 9 August 2013: Sara Baras
- 10 August 2013: Starlite Gala
- 11 August 2013: Alejandro Sanz
- 14 August 2013: Malú
- 15 August 2013: Paco de Lucía, his last concert in Spain
- 16 August 2013: Forever Michael & Whitney
- 17 August 2013: Enrique Iglesias
- 21 August 2013: UB40
- 23 August 2013: Grease the musical in concert
- 24 August 2013: David Bisbal

=== 2014 ===
The 2014 festival included Julio Iglesias, Chucho Valdés, Dani Martín, Sergio Dalma, and Rosario Flores.

In addition, Starlite 2014 featured concerts such as "Divas", starring Marta Sánchez and Gloria Gaynor, "Otra noche movida", as well as "Tribute to ABBA", Alejandro Sanz, Alejandro Fernández, Miguel Poveda, Josep Carreras and Ainhoa Arteta and Siempre Así.

Other international artists included Ricky Martin, Kool and the Gang, Pet Shop Boys, Tom Jones, The Beach Boys and Albert Hammond.

The following concerts were held:

- 23 July 2014: The Beach Boys
- 24 July 2014: Chucho Valdes
- 25 July 2014: Ricky Martin
- 26 July 2014: Albert Hammond
- 30 July 2014: Pet Shop Boys
- 31 July 2014: Josep Carreras and Ainhoa Arteta
- 01/08/2014: Alejandro Fernández
- 02/08/2014: Miguel Poveda
- 06/08/2014: Divas Marta Sánchez and Gloria Gaynor
- 07/08/2014: Sergio Dalma
- 09/08/2014: Starlite Gala
- 13 August 2014: Julio Iglesias
- 14 August 2014: Dani Martín
- 15 August 2014: Otra Noche Movida
- 16 August 2014: Rosario
- 17 August 2014: Tom Jones
- 19 August 2014: Kool & the Gang
- 20 August 2014: Siempre Así
- 21 August 2014: Tribute to Abba
- 22 August 2014: Alejandro Sanz

== Starlite Gala ==
Starlite Gala, the centerpiece evening of the Starlite Project, is hosted by Antonio Banderas and has become the largest charity event in Spain. Some of the many personalities who have joined Banderas and Melanie Griffith include Daryl Hannah, Deepak Chopra, Valeria Mazza, Adriana Karembeu, Eva Longoria, Ute Ohoven and Boris Becker. All proceeds from the dinner and charity action are donated to select foundations: Lágrimas y Favores, Niños en Alegría, Cudeca, Caritas and guest foundation year.

Financial support for the Starlite Gala is provided by sponsors with logistical support from Starlite Productions, which donates its on-site team and provides production assistance.

== Starlite Disco ==
Starlite Disco is open every night for a month, from 23 July to 23 August. It offers daily and varied programming, themed parties of all kinds, being the only outdoor disco in a natural quarry.

== Starlite Gastro ==
Starlite Festival also has an area dedicated to haute cuisine featuring food from gourmet area restaurants.

== Starlite Films ==
One night each week, the Starlite Auditorium turns into an open-air summer cinema with the largest screen in the country.

== Starlite Fashion ==
The festival also includes a number of fashion events. In previous years, Starlite hosted Gómez y Molina jewellery shows and the "Marbella Crea" event, giving young fashion designers a chance to show their work. The "Cosmic Girls" runaway featured model and designer Laura Sánchez showing her own swimwear collection, joined by her boyfriend, David Ascanio. She was accompanied by Spanish top models such as Malena Costa, Verónica Blume and Cristina Tossio.

== Starlite Art ==
In 2013, actor Jordi Mollá, El Hombre de Negro, Hubertus Von Hohenlohe and Bernardo Doral were chosen to show their work to the Starlite audience, which was well received by critics.

== Starlite Battles ==
Starlite Battles, a battle of the bands, has been held.
