= Auditorio Siglo XXI =

Auditorio Metropolitano
- Metropolitan Auditorium
- Interactive map of Auditorio Metropolitano
- Former names: Auditorio Siglo XXI (2005-14)
- Address: Calle Sirio #2926; Reserva Territorial Atlixcáyotl; 72560 Puebla, PUE, Mexico
- Location: Angelópolis
- Coordinates: 19.035036601850027°N 98.23684094374846°W
- Owner: Organismo Convenciones y Parques
- Capacity: 5,634

Construction
- Groundbreaking: 2002
- Opened: 1 January 2005
- Architect: Pedro Ramírez Vázquez
- General contractor: Proyectos y Estudios Especializados de México S.A. de C.V.
- Building details

General information
- Renovated: September 2014—January 2015
- Renovation cost: $416.9 million

Renovating team
- Main contractor: Trena S.A. de C.V.

Auditorio Metropolitano (originally Auditorio Siglo XXI) is an indoor amphitheatre located in Puebla, Mexico. It was designed by a famed Mexican architect Pedro Ramírez Vázquez.

== About ==
The venue was commissioned in 2001, with construction beginning in 2002. The music hall opened January 2005, as a part of the Centro de Convenciones Puebla William O. Jenkins. It was known for its facade made of talavera tiles. In 2014, the venue began a controversial renovation removing the tiles with tempered glass. These changes were protested by Vázquez's son. Renovations began September 2014. During this time, a contest was held to rename the concert venue. In December 2014, it was announced the name was changing to Auditorio Metropolitano.

== Noted performers ==
- Alejandra Guzmán
- Alejandro Fernández
- Andrés Calamaro
- Backstreet Boys
- Bryan Adams
- Chicago
- Daniel Boaventura
- David Bisbal
- Edith Márquez
- Emmanuel
- Enrique Iglesias
- Fernando Delgadillo
- Franco De Vita
- Gloria Gaynor
- Il Divo
- Intocable
- Jethro Tull
- Juanes
- Judas Priest
- La Gusana Ciega
- Los Tigres Del Norte
- Luis Miguel
- Manuel Mijares
- Marco Antonio Solís
- Margarita La Diosa de la Cumbia
- Roberto Carlos
- Santana
- Sarah Brightman
- Silvio Rodríguez
- Wisin & Yandel
