= Auditorio Josefa Ortiz de Domínguez =

Arena in Querétaro, Mexico

Coordinates: 20°35′9″N 100°22′40″W

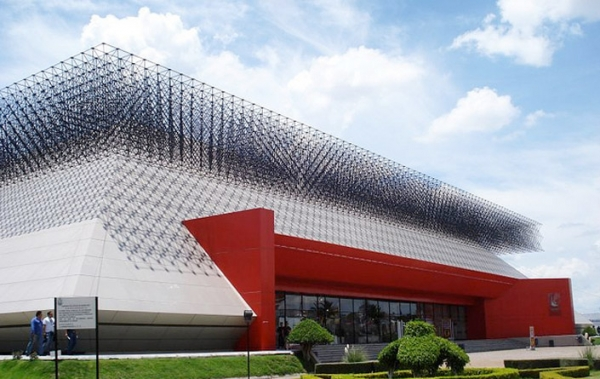
AJODD

Auditorio Josefa Ortiz de Domínguez is a 4,749-seat indoor arena located in Querétaro, Mexico. It is one of the few arenas or auditoriums which had its very first event aired on network television, opening on February 5, 1985, with a taping of the Televisa program Siempre en Domingo. Since that first event, many events have followed, including concerts, graduation ceremonies, basketball games, lucha libre, conventions, meetings and the occasional Premios TVyNovelas ceremony.

The auditorium contains 89 boxes, 3,125 permanent seats and 1,624 folding chairs that can be placed on the floor for concerts and sporting events. There is also a permanent stage at the auditorium, as well as a removable orchestra pit. It also contains state-of-the-art lighting and sound systems. There is parking for 6,700 cars.

The auditorium celebrated its silver anniversary in 2010, and has welcomed some of the biggest names in Mexican entertainment, including Vicente Fernández, Pepe Aguilar, Tatiana, Alejandra Guzmán, Pedro Fernández, Alicia Villarreal (with and without Grupo Limite), Luis Miguel, La Oreja de Van Gogh, Flans, Fey, Thalía, Intocable, Los Tigres del Norte, Rocío Dúrcal, Lupita D'Alessio, Soy Luna, Gloria Trevi and many others. The play Aventurera has been presented here. It is one of two venues in Querétaro to be named after Mexican War of Independence heroine Josefa Ortiz de Dominguez, the other being Estadio Corregidora which was also built in 1985.
