= Corazón Partío =

Single by Alejandro Sanz

from the album Más
- Released: November 3, 1997
- Recorded: 1997
- Genre: Latin pop
- Length: 5:46
- Label: WEA Latina
- Songwriter: Alejandro Sanz

Alejandro Sanz singles chronology
| "Y, ¿Si Fuera Ella?" (1997) | "Corazón Partío" (1997) | "Amiga Mía" (1998) |

"Corazón Partío" (English: "Broken heart") is a song written and performed by Spanish singer-songwriter Alejandro Sanz from his 1997 album Más. Released as a single, the flamenco-influenced upbeat song was his international breakthrough and entered several Billboard charts in the United States, including Hot Latin Tracks and Hot Dance Singles Sales. It became one of Sanz's signature songs. A remix of the song, released in 1998, reached number one in Spain.

== Reception ==
Allmusic writer Jason Birchmeier called "Corazón Partío" a "key hit single ... that transcended his core female audience", adding that it was "a hit so big it changed the course of Sanz's career". The song was honored with wins at the Premios Ondas and BMI Latin Awards. The song is a staple of Sanz's live shows, with Sanz noting that "I can't stop playing that or they will throw rocks at me". A live version of the song is included on Sanz's 2001 MTV Unplugged album. The song also received a nomination for Pop Song of the Year at the 1999 Lo Nuestro Awards.

== Other versions ==
Julio Iglesias recorded a cover version of "Corazón Partío" on his 2000 album Noche de Cuatro Lunas. Manny Manuel covered the song in merengue in his 1998 album, Es Mi Tiempo. Clave Norteña performed a Regional Mexican version which peaked at #15 on the Billboard Regional Mexican Songs chart.

Portuguese jazz singer Maria João covered the track on her 2002 Undercovers album. American pianist Arthur Hanlon included his rendition of the song on his 2003 album 11 Numeros Unos. Brazilian singer Ivete Sangalo performed the song with Sanz on her 2007 live CD/DVD Multishow ao Vivo: Ivete no Maracanã.

Armenian pop singer Hayko recorded a cover version of "Corazón Partío" in Armenian (Ետ նայիր ու տես - Look back and see) in 2004. Lyrics are by Vardan Zadoyan.

Grupo eÑe released a salsa version of the song on their 1998 album, Tibiritabara.

Eliane Elias included the song in her 2021 album Mirror Mirror.

The Italian singer-songwriter Gigi Finizio reinterpreted "Corazón Partío" into Italian with the title "Mi hai spezzato il cuore". This version was performed live on several occasions, including a concert held at the Acciaieria Sonora in Bagnoli, Naples.

Mexican singer-songwriter Tito Double P released his own interpretation of the song in collaboration with Apple Music, dubbed "Corazón Partío (Apple Music Sessions)" on 6 February 2025.

== Charts ==
=== Weekly charts ===
Weekly chart performance for "Corazón Partío"
| Chart (1997–1998) | Peak position |
|---|---|
| Spain (PROMUSICAE) | 1 |
| US Hot Latin Songs (Billboard) | 3 |
| US Latin Pop Airplay (Billboard) | 3 |
| US Hot Dance Singles Sales (Billboard) | 41 |
| US Latin Tropical/Salsa Airplay (Billboard) | 7 |

=== Year-end charts ===
Year-end chart performance for "Corazón Partío"
| Chart (1998) | Position |
|---|---|
| Brazil (Crowley) | 89 |
| US Latin Songs (Billboard) | 24 |
| US Latin Pop Airplay (Billboard) | 8 |
| Chart (1999) | Position |
| Brazil (Crowley) | 7 |

== Certifications and sales ==
| Region | Certification | Certified units/sales |
|---|---|---|
| Spain Physical sales | — | 102,000 |
| Spain (Promusicae) | 4× Platinum | 240,000^{‡} |
^{‡} Sales+streaming figures based on certification alone.
