= No Es lo Mismo =

Album by Alejandro Sanz

Studio album by Alejandro Sanz
- Released: September 2, 2003
- Recorded: February–July 2003
- Studio: Critiera Moon Studios; Glenwood Place Studios, Burbank, California; Sintonía Studios, Madrid, Spain
- Genre: Latin pop
- Length: 50:26
- Label: WEA Latina
- Producer: Lulo Pérez; Alejandro Sanz; Paco de Lucía; Rosa Lagarrigue

Alejandro Sanz chronology
MTV Unplugged (2001)	No Es lo Mismo (2003)	Grandes Éxitos 1991–2004 (2004)

Singles from No Es lo Mismo
- 1. "No Es lo Mismo" Released: July 28, 2003; 2. "Regálame la Silla Donde Te Esperé" Released: October 6, 2003; 3. "Eso" Released: November 17, 2003; 4. "He Sido Tan Feliz Contigo" Released: January 5, 2004; 5. "Try To Save Your S'ong" Released: May 3, 2004

Professional ratings
Review scores
Source	Rating
Allmusic	4/5 stars

No Es lo Mismo (English: It's Not the Same) is the seventh studio album recorded by Spanish singer-songwriter Alejandro Sanz, released on September 2, 2003 by WEA Latina and produced in collaboration with Cuban musician Lulo Pérez.

== Track listing ==
All tracks are written by Sanz.

No.	Title	Length
1.	"No Es Lo Mismo"	6:04
2.	"Hoy Llueve, Hoy Duele"	4:52
3.	"He Sido Tan Feliz Contigo"	3:50
4.	"Try to Save Your S'ong"	3:40
5.	"Eso"	4:18
6.	"Labana"	5:28
7.	"Sandy a Orilla Do Mundo"	3:25
8.	"12 Por 8"	4:40
9.	"Al Olvido Invito Yo"	4:21
10.	"Regálame La Silla Donde Te Esperé"	4:50
11.	"Lo Diré Bajito"	4:25
12.	"Sí, He Cantado Mal"	0:19
Total length:		50:26

== Personnel ==
- Adonaya Agarrado Méndez – backing vocals in "12 Por 8"
- Tomasa Agarrado Méndez – backing vocals in "12 Por 8"
- Manu Araujo – stylist
- Hammadi Bayard – saxophone
- Tom Bender – mixing assistant
- Nancy Berek-Mraz – recording coordinator
- Miguel Betancourt – recording coordinator
- Dana Bourke – recording assistant
- Vinnie Colaiuta – drums
- Luis Conte – percussion
- Tomás Cruz – conga in "Regálame la Silla Donde Te Esperé"
- Niños De Jerez – backing vocals in "12 Por 8"
- Jaume de Laiguana – art direction, graphic design, photography
- Paco de Lucía – acoustic guitar in "Regálame la Silla Donde Te Esperé"
- Adrián Fregnac – assistant engineer
- Carlos González – backing vocals
- GQ – rap
- Guere – bass in "Sandy a Orilla do Mundo"
- Mick Guzauski – mixing except for "Labana"
- Horacio Hernandez – drums
- Anthony Jackson – bass
- Simon James – conductor (concertino)
- Daniel Kresco – assistant engineer
- Rosa Lagarrigue – executive producer
- Michael Landau – acoustic guitar, electric guitar
- Bob Ludwig – mastering
- Ala Madrugada – backing vocals
- Carlos Martin – trombone
- Delvis Mesa – piano in "Sandy a Orilla do Mundo"
- Raúl Midón – backing vocals
- Zaida Moreno Ruíz – backing vocals in "12 Por 8"
- María Antonia Nogaredo – backing vocals
- The Northwest Sinfonia – orchestra, strings
- Wendy Pedersen – backing vocals
- Lena Pérez – backing vocals
- Lulo Pérez – arranger, backing vocals], flugelhorn, keyboards, piano, programming, trumpet, producer, bass synthesizer in "Try To Save Your S'ong," hammond organ in "Eso"
- Santiago Pérez – conductor (orchestra)
- José Antonio Rodríguez – acoustic guitar
- Carlos Rufo – electric guitar
- Enrique Ruíz Carrasco – backing vocals in "12 Por 8"
- Alejandro Sanz – vocals, acoustic guitar, arranger, backing vocals, producer
- Alejandro Sanz – tres in "Labana"
- Rafa Sardina – engineer, flute in "Sandy a Orilla do Mundo," mixing for "Labana"
- Pepo Scherman – engineer
- Jon Schluckebier – recording assistant
- Shaw Simmon – recording assistant
- Rafaela Soto Bermúdez – backing vocals in "12 Por 8"
- Eddie Thomas – backing vocals
- Javier Valverde – assistant engineer, mixing assistant, backing vocals
- Chelo Vázquez – backing vocals in "12 Por 8"'
- Irene Vázquez – backing vocals in "12 Por 8"
- Dan Warner – acoustic guitar, electric guitar, guitar (nylon string)

== Awards ==
Year	Category	Title	Result
2004	Latin Grammy Award for Record of the Year	No Es lo Mismo	Won
2004	Latin Grammy Award for Album of the Year	No Es lo Mismo	Won
2004	Latin Grammy Award for Song of the Year	No Es lo Mismo	Won
2004	Latin Grammy Award for Best Male Pop Vocal	No Es lo Mismo	Won
2004	Latin Grammy Award for Best Engineered Album	No Es lo Mismo	Won
2004	Grammy Award for Best Latin Pop Album	No Es lo Mismo	Won

== Chart performance ==
=== Album ===
Year	Chart	Peak	Weeks on chart
2003	Billboard Latin Pop Albums	2	23
2003	Billboard Top Latin Albums	2	29
2003	Billboard The Billboard 200	128	3
2003	Billboard Top Heatseekers	3	11
2003	Billboard Top Heatseekers (Pacific)	4	3
2003	Billboard Top Heatseekers (South Atlantic)	1	9

=== Singles ===
Year	Chart	Track	Peak	Weeks on chart
2003	Billboard Hot Latin Songs	No Es lo Mismo	4	17
2003	Billboard Latin Pop Airplay	No Es lo Mismo	3	24
2003	Billboard Latin Tropical Airplay	No Es lo Mismo	23	8
2003	Billboard Hot Latin Songs	Regálame La Silla Donde Te Esperé	23	8
2003	Billboard Latin Pop Airplay	Regálame la Silla Donde Te Esperé	16	13
2004	Billboard Hot Latin Songs	Eso	25	7
2004	Billboard Latin Pop Airplay	Eso	13	13

== Certifications and sales ==
Region	Certification	Certified units/sales
Argentina (CAPIF)	3× Platinum	120,000^{^}
Mexico (AMPROFON)	2× Platinum	200,000^{^}
Spain (Promusicae)	8× Platinum	800,000^{^}
United States (RIAA)	Platinum (Latin)	100,000^{^}
^{^} Shipments figures based on certification alone.

== Special edition ==
No Es lo Mismo: Edición Especial Gira

Studio album by Alejandro Sanz
- Released: July 27, 2004
- Recorded: February – July 2003; Critiera Moon Studios (Miami, Florida); Glenwood Place Studios (Burbank, California); Sintonía Studios (Madrid, Spain)
- Genre: Latin pop
- Length: 71:27 (CD)
- Label: WEA Latina
- Producer: Lulo Pérez · Alejandro Sanz

No Es lo Mismo: Edición Especial Gira is the 2004 re-release of the album No Es lo Mismo containing a CD and DVD. The CD contains 5 new tracks and the DVD contains 11 videos.

== Re-release ==
No Es lo Mismo

Studio album by Alejandro Sanz
- Released: September 26, 2006
- Recorded: February – July 2003; Critiera Moon Studios (Miami, Florida); Glenwood Place Studios (Burbank, California); Sintonía Studios (Madrid, Spain)
- Genre: Latin pop
- Label: WEA Latina

No Es lo Mismo (Edición 2006) is the 2006 re-release of the album No Es lo Mismo containing a CD and DVD. The CD contains 15 tracks and the DVD contains 13 videos.

== See also ==
- List of best-selling Latin albums
