= MTV Unplugged (Alejandro Sanz album) =

Live album by Alejandro Sanz
- Released: November 20, 2001
- Recorded: October 9, 2001, at Gusman Center (Miami, Florida)
- Genre: Acoustic music, Latin pop
- Length: 62:32
- Label: WEA Latina
- Producer: Humberto Gatica, Audrey Morrissey, Kenny O'Brien (co-producer), Charlie Singer (executive producer)

Alejandro Sanz chronology
Lo Esencial de... Alejandro Sanz (2001)	MTV Unplugged (2001)	No Es lo Mismo (2003)

Singles from MTV Unplugged
- 1. "Y Sólo Se Me Ocurre Amarte" Released: 2001; 2. "Quisiera Ser" Released: 2001; 3. "Aprendiz" Released: 2002; 4. "Toca Para Mí" Released: 2002

Professional ratings
Review scores
Source	Rating
Allmusic	3/5 stars

MTV Unplugged is the second live album from Spanish singer-songwriter Alejandro Sanz, which turns him into the first Spanish artist in recording an unplugged for MTV, and in this opportunity he resorts to Humberto Gatica's talent as producer and arranger. This album contains an inedit song, "Y Sólo Se Me Ocurre Amarte" dedicated to his daughter Manuela, the song "Aprendiz" that Alejandro composed for the Spanish singer Malú, a different version of "Cómo Te Echo de Menos" and a flamenco song, "Todo Es de Color" by Manuel Molina.

== Awards ==
Year	Category	Title	Result	Ref.
2002	Latin Grammy Award for Album of the Year	MTV Unplugged	Won	
2002	Latin Grammy Award for Producer of the Year	MTV Unplugged – Humberto Gatica	Nominated	

== Track listing ==
1. "Cuando Nadie Me Ve" – 5:06
2. "Y Sólo Se Me Ocurre Amarte" – 4:35
3. "Amiga Mía" – 5:03
4. "Se Le Apagó La Luz" – 5:13
5. "Quisiera Ser" – 4:41
6. "Aprendiz" – 5:02
7. "Quiero Morir En Tu Veneno" – 4:30
8. "Cómo Te Echo De Menos" – 4:29
9. "Corazón Partío" – 5:00
10. "Siempre Es De Noche" – 4:50
11. "Toca Para Mí" – 4:13
12. "Lo Que Fui Es Lo Que Soy" – 5:24
13. "Todo Es De Color" – 4:26

== Personnel ==
- Cheche Alara – Director
- Tim Barnes – Viola
- Luis Bonilla – Trombone
- Chris Brooke – Assistant engineer
- Huifang Chen – Violin
- Vinnie Colaiuta – Drums
- Helen de Quiroga – Background vocals
- Txell Sust – Background vocals
- Justin Douglas – Assistant
- Brandon Fields – Flute, saxophone
- Scott Flavin – Violin
- Orlando J. Forte – Violin
- Humberto Gatica – Arranger, engineer, mixing, producer
- Chris Glansdorp – Cello
- Kevin Guarnieri – Assistant engineer
- Chad Hailey – Assistant engineer
- Ross Harbaugh – Cello
- David Heuer – Assistant engineer
- Harry Kim – Arranger, trumpet
- Audrey Morrissey – Producer
- Kenny O'Brien – Arranger, background vocals, digital editing, co-producer
- Herman Cools - Monitor engineer
- Scott O'Donnell – Viola
- Alfredo Oliva – Strings contractor, violin
- Rafael Padilla – Percussion
- Bill Ross – Arranger
- Kamil Rustam – Guitar
- Armand Sabal-Lecco – Bass
- Javier Salas – Photography
- Alejandro Sanz – Vocals, cajón, Spanish guitar
- Rafael Sañudo – Design
- Eric Schilling – Engineer
- Charlie Singer – Executive producer
- Ramon Stagnaro – Guitar
- Heitor Teixeira Pereira – Guitar
- Ludovico Vagnone – Supervisor
- Rick Valero – Guitar technician
- Javier Valverde – Assistant engineer
- Randy Waldman – Piano
- Pete Wallace – Hammond organ

== Chart performance ==
=== Album ===
Chart (2001)	Peak position
Billboard Latin Pop Albums	1
Billboard Top Latin Albums	1
Billboard Heatseekers	16
Billboard Top Heatseekers (South Atlantic)	4

Chart (2002)	Peak position
Billboard Top Heatseekers (Pacific)	7

=== Singles ===
Chart (2001)	Single	Peak position
Billboard Hot Latin Songs	"Y Solo Se Me Ocurre Amarte"	10
Billboard Latin Pop Airplay	"Y Solo Se Me Ocurre Amarte"	5
Billboard Latin Tropical/Salsa Airplay	"Y Solo Se Me Ocurre Amarte"	14

Chart (2002)	Single	Peak position
Billboard Hot Latin Songs	"Aprendiz"	13
Billboard Latin Pop Airplay	"Aprendiz"	10
Billboard Hot Latin Songs	"Toca Para Mi"	38
Billboard Latin Pop Airplay	"Toca Para Mi"	18
Billboard Latin Tropical/Salsa Airplay	"Toca Para Mi"	23

== Certifications and sales ==
Region	Certification	Certified units/sales
Argentina (CAPIF)	2× Platinum	80,000^{^}
Brazil (Pro-Música Brasil)	Gold	50,000^{*}
Chile	Platinum	
Colombia	Platinum	
Mexico (AMPROFON)	2× Platinum	300,000^{^}
Mexico (AMPROFON) Video	Gold	10,000^{^}
Spain (Promusicae)	5× Platinum	500,000^{^}
United States (RIAA)	2× Platinum (Latin)	200,000^{^}
Venezuela	Platinum	
^{*} Sales figures based on certification alone.^{^} Shipments figures based on certification alone.
