= Si Tú Me Miras =

Studio album by Alejandro Sanz
- Released: August 17, 1993
- Recorded: February – April 1993
- Studio: Townhouse Studios, London
- Genre: Latin pop
- Length: 41:19
- Label: WEA Latina
- Producer: Miguel Ángel Arenas, Nacho Mañó, Paco de Lucía

Alejandro Sanz chronology
Viviendo Deprisa (1991)	Si Tú Me Miras (1993)	Básico (1994)

Singles from Si Tú Me Miras
- 1. "Si Tú Me Miras" Released: 1993; 2. "Cómo Te Echo de Menos" Released: 1993

Professional ratings
Review scores
Source	Rating
AllMusic	5/5 stars

Si Tú Me Miras (If You Look at Me) is the third studio album recorded by Spanish singer and songwriter Alejandro Sanz, It was released by WEA Latina on August 17, 1993. where he counted with the collaboration of musicians Paco de Lucía (in the tracks "El Escaparate" and "Mi Primera Canción") and Nacho Mañó (in the album production). In this album appear tracks as "Si Tú Me Miras" and others in which the author begins to appreciate a musical evolution. The official singles of the album were "Si Tú Me Miras" and "Cómo Te Echo de Menos", and he shot videos for both songs.

== Track listing ==
1. "Si Tú Me Miras" – 4:17
2. "Tu Letra Podré Acariciar" – 3:38
3. "El Escaparate" – 4:47
4. "Cómo Te Echo de Menos" – 4:01
5. "Cuando Acabas Tú" – 4:03
6. "Mi Primera Canción" – 4:38
7. "Vente al Más Allá" – 4:00
8. "Qué No Te Daría Yo" – 3:36
9. "Este Pobre Mortal" – 3:35
10. "A Golpes Contra el Calendario" – 5:02

== Personnel ==
- Miguel Ángel Arenas – producer
- Mike Brittain – double bass
- Stuart Brooks – trumpet
- Ben Cruft – violin
- Chris Davies – saxophone
- Paco de Lucía – Spanish guitar courtesy of PolyGram Iberica
- Mike de Saulles – violin
- Alan Douglas – engineer
- David Emmanuel – viola
- Jon Evans-Jones – violin
- Roger Garland – violin
- Wilf Gibson – violin
- Tim Grant – viola
- Mark Haley – assistant engineer
- Brian Hawkins – viola
- John Heley – cello
- Ian Ross of Bill Smith Studio – cover design
- Garfield Jackson – viola
- Paul Kegg – cello
- Boguslav Kostecki – violin
- Chris Laurence – double bass
- Helen Liebmann – cello
- Martin Loveday – cello
- Rita Manning – violin
- Nacho Mañó – producer, director
- Jim McLeod – violin
- Perry Montague-Mason – violin
- Pete Oxer – violin
- Pablo Pérez Minguez – photography
- Tony Pleeth – cello
- Jorge Represa – photography
- Eddie Saeta – photography
- Alejandro Sanz – vocals
- Neil Sidwell – trombone
- Steve Sidwell – trumpet
- Bob Smissen – viola
- John Thirkell – trumpet
- Phil Todd – saxophone
- Justin Ward – viola
- Mark Warner – assistant engineer
- Barry Wilde – violin
- Gavin Wright – violin

== Re-release ==
Si Tú Me Miras

Studio album by Alejandro Sanz
- Released: September 26, 2006
- Recorded: February–April 1993
- Studio: Townhouse Studios, London; CineArte, Madrid; Condulmer Studios, Venice
- Genre: Latin pop
- Label: Warner Music Latina

Si Tú Me Miras (Edición 2006) is the re-release of the album Si Tú Me Miras containing a CD and DVD. The CD contains 13 tracks and the DVD contains 6 videos.

== Track listing ==
=== CD ===
1. "Si Tú Me Miras" – 4:14
2. "Tu Letra Podré Acariciar" – 3:34
3. "El Escaparate" – 4:46
4. "Cómo Te Echo de Menos" – 4:00
5. "Cuando Acabas Tú" – 4:01
6. "Mi Primera Canción" – 4:36
7. "Vente al Más Allá" – 3:56
8. "Qué No Te Daría Yo" – 3:34
9. "Este Pobre Mortal" – 3:36
10. "A Golpes Contra el Calendario" – 5:02
11. "Tu Letra Podré Acariciar (Versión Básico)" – 3:31
12. "Com um Olhar (Si Tú Me Miras)" – 4:16
13. "Rumba (Lo Que Te He Escrito Yo) (Demo)" – 3:40

=== DVD ===
1. "Cómo Te Echo de Menos" (video)
2. "Si Tú Me Miras" (video)
3. "Mi Primera Canción" (from the Básico concert)
4. "Qué No Te Daría Yo" (from the Básico concert)
5. "Cómo Te Echo de Menos" (from the Básico concert)
6. "A Golpes Contra el Calendario" (from the Básico concert)

== Certifications ==
Region	Certification	Certified units/sales
Argentina (CAPIF)	Platinum	60,000^{^}
Spain (PROMUSICAE)	5× Platinum	500,000^{^}
^{^} Shipments figures based on certification alone.
