= Más (album) =

Studio album by Alejandro Sanz
- Released: 9 September 1997
- Recorded: 1996–1997
- Studio: Excalibur Studios; Morning Studios (Milan, Italy); Plastic Studios (Rome, Italy)
- Genre: Latin pop
- Length: 51:01
- Label: WEA Latina
- Producer: Miguel Ángel Arenas · Emanuele Ruffinengo

Alejandro Sanz chronology
3 (1995)	Más (1997)	Discografía Completa: Edición Especial Gira 98 (1998)

Singles from más
- 1. "Y, ¿Si Fuera Ella?" Released: August 4, 1997; 2. "Corazón Partío" Released: November 3, 1997; 3. "Amiga Mía" Released: January 5, 1998; 4. "Aquello Que Me Diste" Released: March 30, 1998; 5. "Si Hay Dios..." Released: June 15, 1998; 6. "Hoy Qué No Estás" Released: July 13, 1998; 7. "Siempre Es De Noche" Released: August 31, 1998

Professional ratings
Review scores
Source	Rating
Allmusic	4/5 stars

Más (More/Most/Plus) is the fifth studio album by Spanish singer-songwriter Alejandro Sanz, it was released by WEA Latina on 9 September 1997. With sales of over 6 million copies worldwide and 2 million in Spain alone, it is one of the best-selling Latin albums and the best-selling album in Spain of all time.

== Track listing ==
All tracks are written by Alejandro Sanz.

No.	Title	Length
1.	"Y, ¿Si Fuera Ella?"	5:22
2.	"Ese Último Momento"	5:04
3.	"Corazón Partío"	5:46
4.	"Siempre Es De Noche"	4:47
5.	"La Margarita Dijo No"	4:52
6.	"Hoy Que No Estás"	5:10
7.	"Un Charquito De Estrellas"	4:50
8.	"Amiga Mía"	4:48
9.	"Si Hay Dios..."	5:36
10.	"Aquello Que Me Diste"	4:46

== Re-release ==
Más (Edición 2006) is the re-release of the album Más containing a CD and DVD. The CD contains 13 tracks and the DVD contains 15 videos.

=== Track listing ===
CD

1. Y, ¿Si Fuera Ella? – 5:22
2. Ese Último Momento – 5:04
3. Corazón Partío – 5:46
4. Siempre Es De Noche – 4:48
5. La Margarita Dijo No – 4:52
6. Hoy Que No Estás – 5:09
7. Un Charquito de Estrellas – 4:50
8. Amiga Mía – 4:47
9. Si Hay Dios... – 5:36
10. Aquello Que Me Diste – 4:44
11. Corazón Partío (Demo) – 4:11
12. Amiga Mía (Demo) – 4:41
13. Y, ¿Si Fuera Ella? (Demo) – 5:22

DVD

1. Y, ¿Si Fuera Ella? (Video)
2. Corazón Partío (Video)
3. Amiga Mía (Video)
4. Aquello Que Me Diste (Video)
5. La Distancia (Piano Y Voz) (Concierto Brasil)
6. Si Hay Dios... (Versión Gospel) (Premios Amigo)
7. Hoy Que No Estás (El Concierto: Tour Más 98)
8. La Margarita Dijo No (El Concierto: Tour Más 98)
9. Y, ¿Si Fuera Ella? (El Concierto: Tour Más 98)
10. Un Charquito De Estrellas (El Concierto: Tour Más 98)
11. Siempre Es De Noche (El Concierto: Tour Más 98)
12. Si Hay Dios... (El Concierto: Tour Más 98)
13. Aquello Que Me Diste (El Concierto: Tour Más 98)
14. Amiga Mía (El Concierto: Tour Más 98)
15. Corazón Partío (El Concierto: Tour Más 98)

== Personnel ==
Adapted from the Más liner notes:

=== Performance credits ===
Musicians

- Lele Melotti – drums (tracks 1–2, 4–10)
- Elio Rivagli – drums (track 3)
- Paolo Costa – bass (tracks 1–2, 4–10)
- Alfredo Paixao – bass (track 3)
- Saverio Porciello – acoustic guitar (tracks 1–2, 4–5, 8–9)
- Joan Bibiloni – acoustic guitar (tracks 5, 8)
- Ludovico Vagnone – electric guitar (all tracks)
- Alejandro Sanz – Spanish guitar (track 3)
- Vicente Amigo – Spanish guitar (track 3)
- Emanuele Ruffinengo – piano, keyboards, programming (all tracks)
- Roberto Manzin – saxophone (tracks 2, 6)
- Rubem Dantas – percussion (track 3)
- Seydu – percussion (track 3)
- Lulo Pérez – percussion, trumpet, flugelhorn (track 3)
- Sergio Lavandera – saxophone (track 3)
- Lázaro Ordóñez – trombone (track 3)
- Luca Jurman – chorus (tracks 1–2, 4–10)
- Elena Roggero – chorus (tracks 1–2, 4, 6–10)
- Paola Repele – chorus (tracks 1–2, 4, 6, 8–10)
- Mayte Pizarro – chorus (tracks 3, 9)
- Eva Durán – chorus (tracks 3)
- Pedro Sánchez – chorus (track 9)

Grupo Folclórico del Coro del Valle – chorus (track 5)

- Enrique "Quique" Ansino
- J. María de Apiazu
- Israel Ceca
- Pablo Francés
- Miguel García
- Rubén García
- J. Miguel "Chemi" Ginés
- Manuel González
- J. Domingo López
- Antíoco Llanos
- Oliver Luna
- Juan Mínguez

=== Technical credits ===
- Emanuele Ruffinengo – producer, arrangements, choir arrangements, brass arrangements (track 3)
- Miguel Ángel Arenas – producer
- Pedro Miguel Ledo – production assistant
- Alejandro Sanz – musical concept
- Lulo Pérez – brass arrangements (track 3)
- Luca Jurman – choir arrangements
- Jesús Ugalde – photography
- Jesús López – photography assistant
- Juanjo Mánez – styling
- Lola López – styling assistant
- Yolanda López – make-up
- Javier Cofiño – hairdressing
- Rafael Sañudo – art direction, art design
- David Quiles – image treatment
- Luca Vittori – recording engineer
- Fabrizio Facioni – recording engineer
- Nino Giuffrida – recording engineer
- Giamba Lizzori – recording engineer
- Juan Vinader – recording engineer
- Oscar Claver – recording engineer
- Renato Cantele – mixing engineer
- Maurizio Biancani – mixing engineer
- Antonio Baglio – mastering engineer

=== Recording, mixing and mastering locations ===
- Excalibur (Milan) – recording
- Plastic (Rome) – recording
- Morning (Milan) – recording, mixing (track 1–2, 4, 6, 8, 10)
- Logic (Milan) – mixing (track 3, 5–7, 9)
- Red Led (Madrid) – additional recordings
- Sintonía (Madrid) – additional recordings
- Nautilus (Milan) – mastering

== Charts ==
=== Weekly charts ===
Weekly chart performance for Más
Chart (1997–99)	Peak position
European Albums (Music & Media)	33
Portuguese Albums (AFP)	2
Spanish Albums (AFYVE)	1
US Heatseekers Albums (Billboard)	16
US Top Latin Albums (Billboard)	5
US Latin Pop Albums (Billboard)	3

=== Monthly charts ===
Monthly chart performance for Más
Chart (1997)	Peak position
Argentine Albums (CAPIF)	4

=== Year-end charts ===
Year-end chart performance for Más
Chart (1997)	Position
Spanish Albums (AFYVE)	1

Chart (1998)	Position
European Albums (Music & Media)	61
Spanish Albums (AFYVE)	1
US Top Latin Albums (Billboard)	10
US Latin Pop Albums (Billboard)	5

Chart (1999)	Position
Brazilian Albums (Nopem)	41
Spanish Albums (AFYVE)	10
US Top Latin Albums (Billboard)	44

== Sales and certifications ==
Region	Certification	Certified units/sales
Argentina (CAPIF)	5× Platinum	300,000^{^}
Bolivia	2× Platinum	
Brazil (Pro-Música Brasil)	Gold	200,000
Chile (IFPI Chile)	4× Platinum	100,000
Colombia (ASINCOL)	2× Platinum	
Ecuador	2× Platinum	
Mexico (AMPROFON)	3× Platinum	750,000^{^}
Paraguay (SPG)	2× Platinum	
Peru (UNIMPRO)	3× Platinum	
Portugal (AFP)	2× Platinum	80,000^{^}
Spain (Promusicae)	22× Platinum	2,200,000^{^}
Thailand	Platinum	100,000
United States (RIAA)	6× Platinum (Latin)	300,000
Uruguay (CUD)	2× Platinum	12,000^{^}
Venezuela (AVINPRO)	3× Platinum	
Summaries
Central America (CFC)	4× Platinum	
Europe (IFPI)	2× Platinum	2,000,000^{*}
Worldwide	—	6,000,000
^{*} Sales figures based on certification alone.^{^} Shipments figures based on certification alone.

== See also ==
- List of best-selling albums in Argentina
- List of best-selling albums in Chile
- List of best-selling albums in Spain
- List of best-selling Latin albums
