= Y, ¿Si Fuera Ella? =

Single by Alejandro Sanz

from the album Más
- Released: September 1, 1997
- Recorded: 1997
- Genre: Latin pop
- Length: 5:22
- Label: WEA Latina
- Songwriter: Alejandro Sanz
- Producers: Emanuele Ruffinengo; Miguel Angel Arenas

Alejandro Sanz singles chronology
"Quiero Morir en Tu Veneno" (1996)	"Y, ¿Si Fuera Ella?" (1997)	"Corazón Partío" (1997)

Music video
- "Y, ¿Si Fuera Ella?" on YouTube

"Y, ¿Si Fuera Ella?" (English: "And, If She Were The Chosen One?") is a song recorded by Spanish singer-songwriter Alejandro Sanz. The song serves as the lead single for Sanz's fourth studio album, Más (1997). It was released for digital download on September 1, 1997.

== Track listing ==
All tracks are written by Sanz.

No.	Title	Length
1.	"Y, ¿Si Fuera Ella?"	5:22
2.	"Y, ¿Si Fuera Ella? (instrumental)"
3.	"Y, ¿Si Fuera Ella? (edit)"

== Cover versions ==
In 2008, South Korean boy band Shinee released a cover version on their album The Shinee World. The song was rewritten and performed in Korean by Shinee's member Kim Jonghyun.

In 2017, the song was covered by Pablo Alborán, David Bisbal, Antonio Carmona, Manuel Carrasco, Jesse & Joy, Juanes, Pablo López, Malú, Vanesa Martín, India Martínez, Antonio Orozco, Niña Pastori, Laura Pausini, Abel Pintos, Rozalén, Shakira & Tommy Torres.

In 2019, Super Junior member Kyuhyun sang Jonghyun's Korean version of the song as his 5th and final defense stage for the King title on the MBC show King Of Masked Singer, as a dedication to the latter with whom he was close friends.

== Chart performance ==
Chart (1997)	Peak position
US Hot Latin Songs (Billboard)	13
US Latin Pop Airplay (Billboard)	3
US Tropical Airplay (Billboard)	9

=== Year-end charts ===
Chart (1999)	Position
Brazil (Crowley)	65

== Certifications and sales ==
Region	Certification	Certified units/sales
Spain (Promusicae)	Platinum	60,000^{‡}
^{‡} Sales+streaming figures based on certification alone.
