= Viviendo Deprisa =

Studio album by Alejandro Sanz
- Released: 20 August 1991
- Recorded: November – December 1990
- Studios: Quarzo Studios (Madrid, Spain)
- Genre: Latin pop
- Length: 42:10
- Label: WEA Latina
- Producer: Miguel Ángel Arenas

Alejandro Sanz chronology
Los Chulos Son Pa' Cuidarlos (1989)	Viviendo Deprisa (1991)	Si Tú Me Miras (1993)

Singles from Viviendo Deprisa
- 1. "Los Dos Cogidos de la Mano" Released: 1991; 2. "Pisando Fuerte" Released: 1991; 3. "Viviendo Deprisa" Released: 1992; 4. "Se le Apagó la Luz" Released: 1992; 5. "Lo Que Fui Es lo Que Soy" Released: 1992

Professional ratings
Review scores
Source	Rating
Allmusic	3.5/5 stars

Viviendo Deprisa (English: Living in a Hurry) is the second studio album recorded by Spanish singer-songwriter Alejandro Sanz. It is his first with label WEA Latina, and was released 20 August 1991.

With this album Sanz was popularized to a national level. He composed all of its songs, though under the pseudonym A. Medina (Algazul Medina), which he had used initially in his career. The singles "Los Dos Cogidos de la Mano" and "Pisando Fuerte" were hits in Spain and were performed for music videos. Other songs that received radio airplay were "Se Le Apagó la Luz" and "Lo Que Fui Es lo Que Soy".

== Track listing ==
All tracks are written by Sanz under the pseudonym A. Medina.

No.	Title	Length
1.	"Los Dos Cogidos de la Mano"	5:02
2.	"Pisando Fuerte"	4:28
3.	"Lo Que Fui Es lo Que Soy"	4:40
4.	"Todo Sigue Igual"	5:13
5.	"Viviendo Deprisa"	3:17
6.	"Se Le Apagó la Luz"	4:46
7.	"Duelo al Amanecer"	3:31
8.	"Completamente Loca"	3:32
9.	"Toca para Mi"	4:07
10.	"Es Este Amor"	3:34

== Re-release ==
An expanded edition of Viviendo Deprisa was released on 26 September 2006 as Viviendo Deprisa (Edición 2006). It contains a CD with three additional tracks and a DVD with six videos:

CD
No.	Title	Length
11.	"Toca para Mí (Demo)"	4:02
12.	"Viviendo Deprisa (Demo)"	3:10
13.	"Se Le Apagó la Luz (Versión Básico)"	4:37

DVD
No.	Title	Length
1.	"Los Dos Cogidos de la Mano (Video)"
2.	"Pisando Fuerte (Video)"
3.	"Lo Que Fui Es lo Que Soy (Concierto Pabellón de Deportes del Real Madrid)"
4.	"Los Dos Cogidos de la Mano (Concierto Pabellón de Deportes del Real Madrid)"
5.	"Se Le Apagó la Luz (Concierto Pabellón de Deportes del Real Madrid)"
6.	"Pisando Fuerte (Concierto Pabellón de Deportes del Real Madrid)"

== Chart performance ==
Year	Chart	Position
1992	Spanish Albums (PROMUSICAE)	8

== Certifications ==
Region	Certification	Certified units/sales
Argentina (CAPIF)	Gold	30,000^{^}
Mexico (AMPROFON)	2× Gold	200,000^{^}
Spain (Promusicae)	9× Platinum	900,000^{^}
^{^} Shipments figures based on certification alone.

== See also ==
- List of best-selling albums in Spain
- List of best-selling Latin albums
