= 3 (Alejandro Sanz album) =

Studio album by Alejandro Sanz
- Released: June 13, 1995
- Recorded: February–March 1995
- Studio: Condulmer Recording Studios (Venice, Italy)
- Genre: Latin pop
- Length: 49:55
- Label: WEA Latina
- Producer: Miguel Ángel Arenas · Emanuele Ruffinengo

Alejandro Sanz chronology
Básico (1994)	3 (1995)	Más (1997)

Singles from 3
- 1. "La Fuerza del Corazón" Released: 1995; 2. "Mi Soledad y Yo" Released: 1995; 3. "¿Lo Ves?" Released: 1996; 4. "Quiero Morir en Tu Veneno" Released: 1996

Professional ratings
Review scores
Source	Rating
Allmusic	3/5 stars

3 is the fourth (third with WEA Latina) studio album recorded by Spanish singer-songwriter Alejandro Sanz. It was released by WEA Latina on June 13, 1995 (see 1995 in music). This album reaffirmed the success obtained with his previous albums and made him popular in Europe and Latin America. The album was also recorded in Portuguese and Italian. All songs were written by Alejandro Sanz except "Quiero Morir en Tu Veneno". The official singles of the album were "La Fuerza del Corazón", "Mi Soledad y Yo", "¿Lo Ves?" and "Quiero Morir en Tu Veneno", and he shot a video for each single.

== Track listing ==
No.	Title	Length
1.	"La Fuerza Del Corazón"	5:06
2.	"Por Bandera"	4:57
3.	"Mi Soledad Y Yo"	5:02
4.	"Ellos Son Así"	4:43
5.	"Quiero Morir En Tu Veneno" (D'Romy Ledo, Adolfo Rubio, Alejandro Sanz)	4:02
6.	"¿Lo Ves?"	3:51
7.	"Canción Sin Emoción"	4:51
8.	"Eres Mía"	5:28
9.	"Ese Que Me Dio Vida"	4:02
10.	"Se Me Olvidó Todo Al Verte"	4:43
11.	"¿Lo Ves? (Piano Y Voz)"	3:38

=== Italian version ===
No.	Title	Length
1.	"Veleno"	4:04
2.	"Per Bandiera"	4:56
3.	"Mi Trascini Via"	5:00
4.	"Tutto Quel Che Ho"	5:01
5.	"Se Tu Mi Guardi"	4:14
6.	"Non É, Per Te, Per Me"	3:49
7.	"Dimentico"	4:30
8.	"Questa Storia É Finita"	4:00
9.	"Sulla Linea Della Vita"	4:46
10.	"Sei Mia"	5:31

=== Portuguese version ===
No.	Title	Length
1.	"A Força do Coração"	5:08
2.	"Com Um Olhar"	4:17
3.	"Minha Solidão e Eu"	5:03
4.	"Se Me Esqueci"	4:21
5.	"Você Era Minha"	5:29
6.	"Quero Morrer Com Teu Veneno"	4:04
7.	"Minha Saudade É Tão Grande"	4:03
8.	"Minha Primeira Canção"	4:36
9.	"Não Vês?"	3:54
10.	"A Luz Se Apagou"	4:48

== Personnel ==
- Jack Adams – Mastering
- Miguel Angel Arenas – Producer
- Stefano Cantini – Saxophone
- Óscar Clavel – Engineer, mixing
- Paolo Costa – Electric bass
- Nigel Hitchcock – Saxophone
- D'Romy Ledo – Background vocals
- Pedro Miguel Ledo – Production assistant
- Juanjo Manez – Stylist "¿Lo Ves? (piano y voz)"
- Lele Melotti – Drums, percussion
- Phil Palmer – Acoustic guitar, electric guitar
- Elena Roggero – Background vocals
- Adolfo Rubio – Background vocals
- Emanuele Ruffinengo – Arranger, keyboards, programming, producer
- Miguel Sacristán – Piano "¿Lo Ves? (piano y voz)"
- Alejandro Sanz – Vocals, arranger, Spanish guitar
- Jesus Ugalde – Photography
- Ludovico Vagnone – Acoustic guitar, electric guitar
- R. Vigil – Design
- Juan Vinader – Engineer, mixing
- Mark Warner – Mixing assistant

== Chart performance ==
=== Singles ===
Year	Chart	Track	Peak	Weeks on chart
1995	Billboard Latin Pop Airplay	La Fuerza del Corazón	9	7

== Album certifications ==
Region	Certification	Certified units/sales
Argentina (CAPIF)	3× Platinum	180,000^{^}
Chile	Gold	
Spain (Promusicae)	8× Platinum	800,000^{^}
^{^} Shipments figures based on certification alone.

== Re-release ==
3 (Edición 2006) is the re-release of the album 3 containing a CD and DVD. The CD contains 14 tracks and the DVD contains 8 videos.

=== Track listing ===
==== CD ====
No.	Title	Length
1.	"La Fuerza del Corazón"	5:05
2.	"Por Bandera"	4:59
3.	"Mi Soledad y Yo"	4:57
4.	"Ellos Son Así"	4:39
5.	"Quiero Morir en Tu Veneno" (D'Romy Ledo, Adolfo Rubio, Alejandro Sanz)	4:02
6.	"¿Lo Ves?"	3:48
7.	"Canción Sin Emoción"	4:48
8.	"Eres Mía"	5:25
9.	"Ese Que Me Dio Vida"	3:58
10.	"Se Me Olvidó Todo al Verte"	4:39
11.	"¿Lo Ves?" (piano y voz)	3:35
12.	"La Fuerza del Corazón" (Demo)	3:56
13.	"Canción Sin Emoción" (Demo)	4:13
14.	"Ese Que Me Dio Vida" (Demo)	3:30

==== DVD ====
1. La Fuerza del Corazón (Video)
2. Mi Soledad y Yo (Video)
3. ¿Lo Ves? (Video)
4. Quiero Morir en Tu Veneno (Video)
5. Veleno (Video)
6. A Força do Coração (Video)
7. Mi Trascini Via (Video)
8. EPK

== See also ==
- List of best-selling albums in Spain
- List of best-selling Latin albums
