= Julio Reyes Copello =

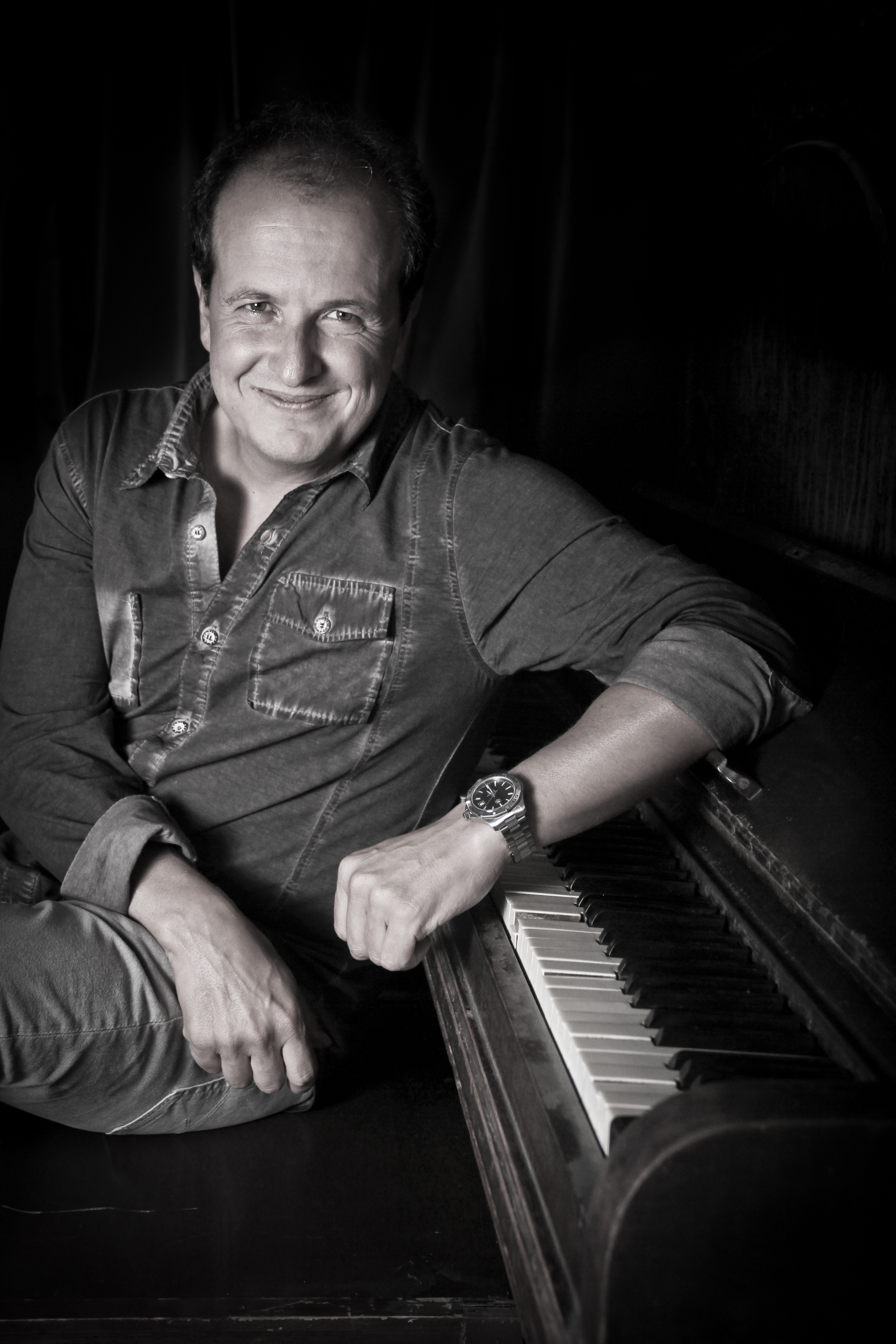

Background information
- Born: April 26, 1969 (age 57)
- Origin: Cúcuta, Colombia
- Occupations: Producer, songwriter, record engineer, pianist
- Instrument: Piano
- Years active: 2001-present
- Label: Art House Records
- Website: julioreyescopello.com

Julio Reyes Copello (born April 26, 1969) is a Colombian producer, composer, songwriter and record engineer. Throughout his career he has worked with multiple renowned artists like Jennifer Lopez, Marc Anthony, Thalía, Chayanne, Kany García, Alejandro Sanz, Paula Arenas, Laura Pausini, Pablo Alborán, Brian May, and Will Smith among others. With over 47 nominations and as a recipient of five Grammy Awards and nine Latin Grammy Awards, Reyes Copello is the most Grammy-nominated Latin producer to date.

== Early life ==
Reyes Copello was born in 1969 in Cúcuta, Colombia and grew up in Bogotá. His interest in music started from an early age, learning how to play the piano with his mother. He has two brothers, Gabriel, the president of the Colombian television network RCN, and Gerardo, an investigative journalist and one of the recipients of the Pulitzer Prize for Investigative Reporting in 1999.

== Career ==
After graduating from the Colegio San Bartolomé La Merced, he began his musical studies at the Pontifical Xavierian University. In 1996, he composed the music for the miniseries Leche, for which he won the India Catalina Award for Best Music the next year. He later received a scholarship for a master's degree in Media Writing and Production at the University of Miami in Miami, the city where he lives ever since.

In 1997, following his years of study, he was chosen by Jorge Calandrelli to compose the arrangements for seven of the songs from the 2001 album Our Favorite Things by Plácido Domingo, the album featured Tony Bennett, Charlotte Church and Vanessa Williams alongside the Vienna Symphony Orchestra.

While in Miami, he reencountered Andrés Recio, his former student who would then become his manager. After working as a songwriter for artists like Malú, Thalía and Jerry Rivera, he met Marc Anthony in 2004. Along with Colombian producer Estéfano, Copello would co-write songs like "Ahora Quien" and "Tu Amor Me Hace Bien" from Anthony's albums Amar Sin Mentiras and Valió la Pena. The later won the Grammy Award for Best Latin Pop Album, with Copello also receiving the award as one of the engineers of the album. His first Latin Grammy Award nomination came in 2003 for his work in Alexandre Pires's Estrella Guía, the record was nominated for Album of the Year and Best Male Pop Vocal Album at the 4th Annual Latin Grammy Awards.

During the 2000s, he continued working with Latin American artists such as Thalía, Ricky Martin, and Jennifer Lopez. In 2009, he was one of the composers of the music for TNT's medical drama series Hawthorne. In 2011, Copello met Alejandro Sanz after a call with Universal Music's president Jesús López, the meeting would result in La Música No Se Toca, the tenth album by Sanz. At the 14th Annual Latin Grammy Awards, Copello received his first consecutive Latin Grammys, winning three, Record of the Year for Sanz's "Mi Marciana" and Best Contemporary Pop Vocal Album for La Música No Se Toca, both as producer and Best Engineered Album for Kany García's self-titled album as engineer.

In 2013, Copello founded the recording studio and label ArtHouse Records in Miami, producing several artists' albums such as Paula Arenas, Juan Pablo Vega, Mariana Vega, and Brika, among others. Ever since his first nomination in 2003, Copello has won nine Latin Grammy Awards out of over forty-seven nominations, eleven Album of the Year nominations, twelve Record of the Year nominations and four Producer of the Year nominations. Many albums produced by Copello have been highly successful, with Jennifer López's Como Ama una Mujer, Chayanne's No Hay Imposibles, Alejandro Sanz's La Música No Se Toca and Ricky Martin's A Quien Quiera Escuchar peaking at number one on the Billboard Top Latin Albums chart.

== Discography ==
Year	Title	Artist	Production	Writing/ Arrangements	Technical
2001	Our Favorite Things (A)	Plácido Domingo, Tony Bennett, Charlotte Church and Vanessa Williams		check	
2001	Esta Vez (A)	Malú		check	
2002	Thalía (A)	Thalía		check	
2002	Vuelva Muy Alto (A)	Jerry Rivera	check	check	
2002	"The Rhythm" (S)	Patricia Manterola	check		
2003	Sincero (A)	Chayanne		check	
2003	Milagro (A)	Jaci Velasquez		check	
2003	Estrella Guía (A)	Alexandre Pires	check	check	
2003	"Y Todo Queda en Nada" (S)	Ricky Martin		check	
2004	Amar Sin Mentiras (A)	Marc Anthony		check	check
2005	El Sexto Sentido (A)	Thalía	check		
2007	"Qué Hiciste" (S)	Jennifer Lopez	check	check	check
2007	Brave (A)	Jennifer López	check		check
2007	Como Ama una Mujer (A)	Jennifer López	check		check
2007	"En las Manos de Dios" (S)	Nelly Furtado		check	
2008	Satisfied (A)	Taylor Dayne	check	check	check
2009	"Moments Like This"	Reamonn	check		
2009	Sin Frenos (A)	La Quinta Estación	check	check	
2009	C'est comme ça (A)	Florent Pagny	check	check	check
2009	Mi Plan (A)	Nelly Furtado		check	
2010	No Hay Imposibles (A)	Chayanne	check	check	check
2010	Viva el Príncipe (A)	Cristian Castro		check	
2011	Brava! (A)	Paulina Rubio	check	check	check
2011	"Ven a Bailar (On the Floor)" (S)	Jennifer Lopez		check	
2012	La Música No Se Toca (A)	Alejandro Sanz	check		check
2012	Kany Garcia (A)	Kany García	check		check
2013	Canciones Para La Luna - Sinfónico En Vivo (A)	Belanova	check		
2013	3.0 (A)	Marc Anthony	check	check	check
2014	Un Alumno Más (A)	Melendi	check	check	check
2014	Voice Demos (A)	Brika	check	check	
2015	Amor & Pasión (A)	Il Divo	check	check	check
2015	Mil Ciudades (A)	Andrés Cepeda		check	
2015	A Quien Quiera Escuchar (A)	Ricky Martin	check	check	check
2015	Conexión (A)	Fonseca	check		
2015	Buena Vida (A)	Diego Torres	check	check	check
2015	Similares (A)	Laura Pausini	check	check	check
2016	Habana (A)	Florent Pagny	check	check	
2017	Prometo (A)	Pablo Alborán	check	check	check
2017	"Amor, Amor, Amor" (S)	Jennifer Lopez featuring Wisin	check	check	check
2017	"Ni Tú Ni Yo" (S)	Jennifer López featuring Gente de Zona	check		check
2018	Oxígeno (A)	Malú	check	check	check
2018	"Lento"	Thalía featuring Gente de Zona		check	
2018	Index (A)	Ana Mena	check	check	
2018	Hazte Sentir (A)	Laura Pausini		check	check
2019	Visceral (A)	Paula Arenas	check	check	
2019	Opus (A)	Marc Anthony			check
2019	#ElDisco (A)	Alejandro Sanz	check	check	check
2020	"Tiburones" (S)	Ricky Martin	check	check	check
2020	PAUSA (EP)	Ricky Martin	check		check
2020	Mesa Para Dos (A)	Kany García	check	check	check
2020	Vértigo (A)	Pablo Alborán	check		check
2020	Renacer (A)	Nahuel Pennisi	check		
2021	Leyendas (A)	Carlos Rivera	check	check	check

(A) Album, (S), Single

=== Film Scoring ===
- Reach for Me (Film, 2008)
- Hawthorne (TV Series, 2009)
- Mars 2030 (Videogame, 2017)

== Awards and nominations ==
=== Grammy Awards ===
Year	Category	Nominated work	Artist	Result	Ref.
2005	Best Latin Pop Album	Amar Sin Mentiras	Marc Anthony	Won	
2017	Best Latin Pop Album	A Quien Quiera Escuchar (Deluxe Edition)	Ricky Martin	Won	
2019	Best Latin Pop Album	Prometo	Pablo Alborán	Nominated	
2020	Best Latin Pop Album	#ElDisco	Alejandro Sanz	Won	
2020	Best Tropical Latin Album	Opus	Marc Anthony	Won	
2022	Best Tropical Latin Album	Pa'lla Voy	Marc Anthony	Won	

=== Latin Grammy Awards ===
Year	Category	Nominated work	Artist	Result	Ref.
2003	Album of the Year	Estrella Guía (as producer)	Alexandre Pires	Nominated	
2010	Producer of the Year	Himself		Nominated	
2012	Record of the Year	"Que Te Vaya Mal" (as producer, engineer)	Kany García	Nominated	
2012	Record of the Year	"No Me Compares" (as producer, engineer)	Alejandro Sanz	Nominated	
2013	Album of the Year	La Música No Se Toca (as producer)	Alejandro Sanz	Nominated	
2013	Best Contemporary Pop Vocal Album	La Música No Se Toca (as producer)	Alejandro Sanz	Won	
2013	Record of the Year	"Vivir Mi Vida" (as producer, engineer)	Marc Anthony	Won	
2013	Record of the Year	"Mi Marciana" (as producer)	Alejandro Sanz	Nominated	
2013	Best Engineered Album	Kany García (as engineer)	Kany García	Won	
2013	Producer of the Year	Himself		Nominated	
2014	Album of the Year	Más Corazón Profundo (as engineer)	Carlos Vives	Nominated	
2014	Album of the Year	3.0 (as producer, engineer)	Marc Anthony	Nominated	
2014	Best Salsa Album	3.0 (as producer, engineer)	Marc Anthony	Won	
2014	Song of the Year	"Cambio de Piel" (as songwriter/producer)	Marc Anthony	Nominated	
2014	Record of the Year	"Cambio de Piel" (as songwriter/producer)	Marc Anthony	Nominated	
2014	Record of the Year	"Cuando Nos Volvamos a Encontrar" (as engineer)	Carlos Vives & Marc Anthony	Nominated	
2015	Record of the Year	"Disparo al Corazón" (as producer, engineer)	Ricky Martin	Nominated	
2016	Album of the Year	Mil Ciudades (as producer)	Andrés Cepeda	Nominated	
2016	Album of the Year	Conexión (as producer)	Fonseca	Nominated	
2016	Album of the Year	Buena Vida (as producer)	Diego Torres	Nominated	
2016	Record of the Year	"Iguales" (as producer, engineer)	Diego Torres	Nominated	
2017	Record of the Year	"Vente Pa' Ca" (as producer, engineer)	Ricky Martin & Maluma	Nominated	
2018	Album of the Year	Prometo (as producer, engineer)	Pablo Alborán	Nominated	
2018	Record of the Year	"No Vaya a Ser" (as producer, engineer)	Pablo Alborán	Nominated	
2018	Producer of the Year	Himself		Nominated	
2019	Album of the Year	Visceral (as producer, engineer)	Paula Arenas	Nominated	
2019	Album of the Year	#ElDisco (as producer, engineer)	Alejandro Sanz	Nominated	
2019	Record of the Year	"Mi Persona Favorita" (as producer, engineer)	Alejandro Sanz and Camila Cabello	Won	
2019	Record of the Year	"Parecen Viernes" (as engineer)	Marc Anthony	Nominated	
2019	Record of the Year	"No Tengo Nada" (as producer)	Alejandro Sanz	Nominated	
2019	Producer of the Year	Himself		Nominated	
2020	Best Singer-Songwriter Album	Mesa Para Dos (as producer, engineer)	Kany García	Won	
2020	Album of the Year	Mesa Para Dos (as producer, engineer)	Kany García	Nominated	
2020	Album of the Year	PAUSA (as producer, engineer)	Ricky Martin	Nominated	
2020	Record of the Year	"Contigo" (as producer, engineer)	Alejandro Sanz	Won	
2020	Record of the Year	"Lo que en ti veo" (as producer, engineer)	Kany García featuring Nahuel Pennisi	Nominated	
2021	Record of the Year	"Un Amor Eterno (Versión Balada)" (as producer, engineer)	Marc Anthony	Nominated	
2021	Record of the Year	"Si Hubieras Querido" (as producer, engineer)	Pablo Alborán	Nominated	
2021	Song of the Year	"Si Hubieras Querido" (as producer, engineer)	Pablo Alborán	Nominated	
2021	Album of the Year	Vértigo (as producer, engineer)	Pablo Alborán	Nominated	
2021	Album of the Year	Mis Amores (as producer, engineer)	Paula Arenas	Nominated	
2022	Song of the Year	"Besos en la Frente" (as songwriter)	Fonseca	Nominated	
2022	Best Pop Song	"Besos en la Frente" (as songwriter)	Fonseca	Nominated	
2022	Album of the Year	Viajante (as producer, engineer)	Fonseca	Nominated	
2022	Album of the Year	Dharma (as producer, engineer, songwriter)	Sebastián Yatra	Nominated	
2022	Album of the Year	Pa'lla Voy (as producer)	Marc Anthony	Nominated	
2022	Best Salsa Album	Pa'lla Voy (as producer)	Marc Anthony	Won	
2022	Producer of the Year	Himself		Won	
2023	Album of the Year	La Cuarta Hoja	Pablo Alborán (as producer and engineer)	Pending	
2023	Best Pop Song	"Bailo Pa Ti" (as songwriter)	Monsieur Periné	Pending	
2023	Producer of the Year	Himself		Pending	
