= El General Naranjo =

Colombian biographical television series

- Genre: Biographical
- Created by: Anita de Hoyos
- Based on: El general de las mil batallas by Julio Sánchez Cristo
- Directed by: Guillermo Mejía; Mónica Botero
- Creative director: Gabriela Monroy
- Music by: Camilo Vega
- Opening theme: "Los buenos somos más" by Various (Note: "Los buenos somos más" performed by Art House, Alejandro Sanz, Adriana Lucía, Fonseca, Yotuel, and Brika.)
- Country of origin: Colombia
- Original language: Spanish
- No. of seasons: 3
- No. of episodes: 52

Production
- Production locations: Bogotá, Colombia; Medellín, Colombia
- Camera setup: Multi-camera
- Production company: Fox Telecolombia

Original release
- Network: Fox Premium
- Release: 24 May 2019 – 1 July 2020

El General Naranjo is a Colombian crime drama television series created by Anita de Hoyos and produced by Fox Telecolombia based on the book El general de las mil batallas written by Julio Sánchez Cristo. The series revolves around Óscar Naranjo (Christian Meier), a Colombian general who was very influential in ending drug trafficking in Colombia and destroying Pablo Escobar and his army of criminals. The series premiered in Latin America 24 May 2019 on Fox Premium, and during its premiere Fox released the full episodes through its subscription app, the full seasons can be viewed all by subscription, while Fox airs one episode on television every Friday, except for the second season, which aired the last episode on a Saturday.

The series consists of 52 one-hour episodes, divided into 3 seasons, which were filmed consecutively. The first season tells about Óscar Naranjo's beginnings in the Police and focuses on the fight against the Medellín cartel. The second season focuses on how he was ascending in the police institution, and the entire strategy to catch the drug traffickers of the Cali and Norte del Valle cartels, who kept a lower profile and were much smarter and less impulsive. While the third season continues the conflict with the FARC and with the paramilitaries, and the role of Naranjo in the peace agreement.

In Colombia, the series premiered on 15 April 2020 on Caracol Televisión, broadcasting the first two seasons consecutively from Monday to Friday.

== Plot ==
This is the story of Óscar Naranjo (Christian Meier) and Colombia in recent decades, told from the point of view of those who did their best to maintain order and law against Pablo Escobar, paramilitarism, drug cartels and the FARC.

== Cast ==
=== Main ===
- Christian Meier as General Óscar Naranjo
- Julián Román as El Liso
- Juliana Galviz as Claudia Luque
- Diego Cadavid as Teniente Héctor Talero (season 1)
- Juan Pablo Shuk as Gilberto Rodríguez Orejuela
- Laura Ramos as Rita Cienfuegos
- Viña Machado as Esperanza (season 1)
- Federico Rivera as Pablo Escobar
- Walter Luengas as Gonzalo Rodríguez Gacha
- Andrés Toro as Gustavo Gaviria Rivero
- Juan Pablo Franco as Miguel Rodríguez Orejuela
- Aldemar Correa as Teniente Fonseca
- Brian Moreno as Agente Bustamante
- Carlos Manuel Vesga as Sargento Andrande
- Morris Bravo as Interno 2 (season 2)
- Diego Garzón as Pablo Jr (adolescent)

=== Recurring ===
- Diana Hoyos as Valentina Montoya
- Susana Rojas as Zaida Guzmán
- Katherine Vélez as Amparo de Naranjo
- Luis Carlos Fuquen as Darío Correa
- Joavany Álvarez as General Sarmiento
- Maruia Shelton as La Canciller
- Esmeralda Pinzón as Yesenia
- Luis Guillermo Blanco Rossi as Juan David Naranjo
- Guillermo Gálvez as General Naranjo Father
- Juan Carlos Arango as Miguel Maza Márquez
- Ernesto Benjumea as Belisario Bentacourt
- Liss Pereira as Carla Gómez
- Carlos Camacho as Sergio Maldonado
- Mauro Mauad as Amado Carrillo Fuentes, "El Señor de Los Cielos" (Season 2)

== Episodes ==
=== Series overview ===
| Series | Episodes | Originally released |
|---|---|---|
| 1 | 13 | 24 May 2019 |
| 2 | 24 | 15 November 2019 |
| 3 | 15 | 17 July 2020 |

=== Season 1 (2019) ===
| No. overall | No. in season | Title | Original release date |
|---|---|---|---|
| 1 | 1 | "Episode 1" | 24 May 2019 |
In 1986, Captain Naranjo interrogates two prisoners in Baton Rouge prison about the murder of his friend and mentor, Sergeant Cuevas, who was killed in a robbery orchestrated by El Liso, a thief who works for Pablo Escobar.
| 2 | 2 | "Episode 2" | 24 May 2019 |
Naranjo and Talero persecute to El Liso and his men who are responsible for the death of Cuevas. On the other hand, Escobar and Gacha carry out a plan to get rid of Orlando, a trafficker who makes their lives difficult.
| 3 | 3 | "Episode 3" | 24 May 2019 |
In his eagerness to catch to El Liso, Naranjo is discovered by Esperanza. El Liso, meanwhile, is executed by Escobar for doing things wrong. Meanwhile, Escobar demonstrates his intense desire to enter politics.
| 4 | 4 | "Episode 4" | 24 May 2019 |
Naranjo believes that El Liso is dead, and this will help El Liso to begin committing anonymity and helping Escobar with his career in politics. Meanwhile, Colonel Luque, father-in-law of Naranjo, begins to discover the truth about Óscar.
| 5 | 5 | "Episode 5" | 24 May 2019 |
Claudia finds out how Naranjo's supposed infidelity with Zaida really happened, and they formalize their relationship again. Meanwhile, the MAS movement is born, which terrifies society with deaths and kidnappings.
| 6 | 6 | "Episode 6" | 24 May 2019 |
After his rapid rise in politics, Escobar manages to obtain a position in the government. Naranjo marries Claudia, begins her courses at the DEA and meets Rita Cienfuegos. On the other hand, the G-31 meets with the president to talk about peace and guarantees.
| 7 | 7 | "Episode 7" | 24 May 2019 |
Naranjo infiltrates Tranquilandia, dismantling the largest cocaine laboratory before his superiors and the government. Escobar and Gacha plan to take action against all the politicians who pressure them.
| 8 | 8 | "Episode 8" | 24 May 2019 |
A wave of violence breaks out; There is an attack against Minister Lara who is assassinated and El Liso, on his own, tries to kill Naranjo in his own home. The war against the cartels intensifies, Ochoa and Abadía are arrested. Naranjo uncovers the relationship between DEA agent White and Wendy, an Escobar spy.
| 9 | 9 | "Episode 9" | 24 May 2019 |
Larry Bean, a DEA informant, sets a trap for Escobar and Gustavo Gaviria to link them to drug trafficking, but the plan is discovered by Escobar, who will seek revenge. Rita Cienfuegos and Naranjo try to save Larry, while Escobar declares war on the magistrates.
| 10 | 10 | "Episode 10" | 24 May 2019 |
Naranjo is chosen to reinforce the security of the Palace of Justice after the wave of violent attacks against judges and magistrates. Gustavo threatens El Liso as he distrusts his way of doing things. Talero goes to Medellín looking for answers about Escobar and risking his life. Escobar joins the G-31 to perpetuate the attack at the Palace of Justice.
| 11 | 11 | "Episode 11" | 24 May 2019 |
El Liso investigates the Palace of Justice to plan the attack, at the same time that it warns Colonel Sepúlveda about it, to fulfill his responsibility to attack the magistrates and expose the G-31 as those responsible for the tragedy. Naranjo warns Reyes Echandía of the imminent danger in which the institution finds itself.
| 12 | 12 | "Episode 12" | 24 May 2019 |
Naranjo is invited to the Embassy of the United States, where he asks the Ambassador to help his government in the fight against drug trafficking. El Liso manages to destroy the evidence that could incriminate him as the person responsible for the attempted terrorist attack.
| 13 | 13 | "Episode 13" | 24 May 2019 |
In Bogotá, several police officers die, and the culprit is a hitman named El Chueco whom El Liso had hired to make the G-31 appear responsible for the deaths.

=== Season 2 (2019) ===
| No. overall | No. in season | Title | Original release date |
|---|---|---|---|
| 14 | 1 | "Episode 1" | 15 November 2019 |
Liso attacks Naranjo and leaves him at his mercy. However, Fonseca reacts with an accurate shot that saves Naranjo's life and leaves Liso injured, who escapes and seeks refuge in a hotel. There the Mexican arrives to collect accounts.
| 15 | 2 | "Episode 2" | 15 November 2019 |
It's 1986 and Naranjo is intrigued to find out who is the author of the compromising photos of him and Rita at the embassy. Investigating and connecting dots, he becomes suspicious of White and devises a plan to attack him and expose his clandestine relationship with Wendy, the model who has ties to Escobar.
| 16 | 3 | "Episode 3" | 15 November 2019 |
In Washington, United States, agent Rita denies being the author of the photos directed at Claudia, while Naranjo must submit to the polygraph to be promoted to the rank of major. There, he gives up after Rita's uncomfortable personal questions.
| 17 | 4 | "Episode 4" | 15 November 2019 |
| 18 | 5 | "Episode 5" | 15 November 2019 |
| 19 | 6 | "Episode 6" | 15 November 2019 |
| 20 | 7 | "Episode 7" | 15 November 2019 |
| 21 | 8 | "Episode 8" | 15 November 2019 |
| 22 | 9 | "Episode 9" | 15 November 2019 |
| 23 | 10 | "Episode 10" | 15 November 2019 |
| 24 | 11 | "Episode 11" | 15 November 2019 |
| 25 | 12 | "Episode 12" | 15 November 2019 |
| 26 | 13 | "Episode 13" | 15 November 2019 |
| 27 | 14 | "Episode 14" | 15 November 2019 |
| 28 | 15 | "Episode 15" | 15 November 2019 |
| 29 | 16 | "Episode 16" | 15 November 2019 |
| 30 | 17 | "Episode 17" | 15 November 2019 |
| 31 | 18 | "Episode 18" | 15 November 2019 |
| 32 | 19 | "Episode 19" | 15 November 2019 |
| 33 | 20 | "Episode 20" | 15 November 2019 |
| 34 | 21 | "Episode 21" | 15 November 2019 |
| 35 | 22 | "Episode 22" | 15 November 2019 |
| 36 | 23 | "Episode 23" | 15 November 2019 |
| 37 | 24 | "Episode 24" | 15 November 2019 |

=== Season 3 (2020) ===
| No. overall | No. in season | Title | Original release date |
|---|---|---|---|
| 38 | 1 | "Episode 1" | 1 July 2020 |
| 39 | 2 | "Episode 2" | 1 July 2020 |
| 40 | 3 | "Episode 3" | 1 July 2020 |
| 41 | 4 | "Episode 4" | 1 July 2020 |
| 42 | 5 | "Episode 5" | 1 July 2020 |
| 43 | 6 | "Episode 6" | 1 July 2020 |
| 44 | 7 | "Episode 7" | 1 July 2020 |
| 45 | 8 | "Episode 8" | 1 July 2020 |
| 46 | 9 | "Episode 9" | 1 July 2020 |
| 47 | 10 | "Episode 10" | 1 July 2020 |
| 48 | 11 | "Episode 11" | 1 July 2020 |
| 49 | 12 | "Episode 12" | 1 July 2020 |
| 50 | 13 | "Episode 13" | 1 July 2020 |
| 51 | 14 | "Episode 14" | 1 July 2020 |
| 52 | 15 | "Episode 15" | 1 July 2020 |
