= Rafa Sardina =

Music recording engineer and producer

- Born: Rafael Sardina; 1968 (age 57–58); Bermeo; Spain
- Occupations: Mixing engineer; Recording engineer; Record producer
- Spouse: Tamara Ovejero

Rafael Sardina, known professionally as Rafa Sardina, is a basque recording engineer, mixing engineer and record producer known for his work with Alejandro Sanz, Luis Miguel, Calle 13, D'Angelo, The Clare Fischer Big Band and Lady Gaga.

Sardina has won 5 Grammy Awards and 14 Latin Grammy Awards. He is the current governor of the Recording Academy, Los Angeles Chapter and has served on the board of trustees of the Latin Recording Academy. Sardina is a founding member and vice chairman of the Latin Recording Academy's CPI (Círculo de Productores e Ingenieros), equivalent to the Producers and Engineers Wing of the Recording Academy. He was the executive producer of the 2017 and 2018 Latin Recording Academy Person of the Year galas honoring Alejandro Sanz and Maná, respectively.

== Early life and career ==
Sardina was born in Bermeo, a fishing port in the Basque Country located in northern Spain. Sardina's interest in music started at a young age. At the age of 6, he secretly played his younger sister's guitar and later told his mother he wanted to become a professional musician.

His parents moved to San Diego, California when he was 15. After a couple of months, Sardina returned to Spain, finished school and started playing in bands. His first experience in a recording studio was at the age of 16, when he attended a recording session of his cousin's band in San Sebastián.

Sardina joined medical school at age 16. During his second year of school, he started working as front of house and monitor engineer for local acts. During his fourth year of school and right before taking the final exam, Sardina decided to drop out. He saved up for a three-week recording certification program at The Recording Workshop school in Chillicothe, Ohio. Sardina then went back to Spain and continued saving until he enrolled in a program at Full Sail University in Orlando, Florida.

In 1993, four weeks before graduating with a Valedictorian Award, Sardina organized a 24-hour trip to Los Angeles. He did interviews at Record Plant, Westlake Recording Studios and Ocean Way Recording, where he later started working and became assistant engineer. During his time at Ocean Way, Sardina recorded artists including Celine Dion, Madonna, Frank Sinatra, The Rolling Stones, Red Hot Chili Peppers, Dr. Dre and David Foster.

In 2001, after working for 5 years at Ocean Way, Sardina founded Fishbone Productions and started working as an independent engineer, recording at his studio "AfterHours". Sardina became better known for his work on Pop, Rock, R&B and Latin records, although he also works on a variety of genres including Jazz, Orchestral, Gospel, World and Film/TV soundtracks. He continued working with artists including Alejandro Sanz, Luis Miguel, Stevie Wonder, Michael Jackson, Lady Gaga and D'Angelo.

Sardina engineered the album "Symphonic Soweto: A Tribute To Nelson Mandela", which won the South African Music Award for Best Contemporary Album in 2018.

== AfterHours Studios ==
Sardina founded AfterHours Studios to record his projects. AfterHours was first located at his previous house. Sardina describes it as being "just a tiny room, tracking little things like drums in the hallway".

The studio is now located in Woodland Hills, Los Angeles, where he remodeled a two-story three-car garage and an adjacent room. The live room, control room and isolation booth are on the first floor, while an office and a lounge are located on the second floor. The studio operates around a Solid State Logic Duality console and incorporates multiple outboard processors into a digital recording system. The studio was featured on Mix Magazine's Class of 2017.

== Awards and nominations ==
=== Grammy Awards ===
Year	Category	Nominated work	Artist	Result	Ref.
2004	Best Latin Pop Album	No Es Lo Mismo (as engineer)	Alejandro Sanz	Won	
2006	Best Mexican/Mexican-American Album	México En La Piel (as engineer)	Luis Miguel	Won	
2008	Best Latin Pop Album	El Tren de los Momentos (as engineer)	Alejandro Sanz	Won	
2016	Record of the Year	"Really Love" (as engineer)	D'Angelo & The Vanguard	Nominated	
2016	Best R&B Album	Black Messiah (as engineer)	D'Angelo & The Vanguard	Won	
2017	Best Latin, Rock, Urban or Alternative Album	L.H.O.N. (as engineer)	Illya Kuryaki & The Valderramas	Nominated	
2017	Best Latin Pop Album	Buena Vida (as engineer)	Diego Torres	Nominated	
2020	Best Latin Pop Album	#ElDisco (as engineer)	Alejandro Sanz	Won	
2020	Best Latin, Rock, Urban or Alternative Album	Indestructible (as engineer and producer)	Flor de Toloache	Nominated	
2021	Best Regional Mexican Music Album (including Tejano)	Hecho En México (as engineer and producer)	Alejandro Fernández	Nominated	

=== Latin Grammy Awards ===
Year	Category	Nominated work	Artist	Result	Ref.
2000	Album of the Year	Amarte Es Un Placer (as engineer)	Luis Miguel	Won	
2000	Best Pop Vocal Album	Amarte Es Un Placer (as engineer)	Luis Miguel	Won	
2003	Record of the Year	"Hasta Que Vuelvas" (as engineer)	Luis Miguel	Nominated	
2004	Record of the Year	"No Es Lo Mismo" (as engineer)	Alejandro Sanz	Won	
2004	Album of the Year	No Es Lo Mismo (as engineer)	Alejandro Sanz	Won	
2004	Best Male Pop Vocal Album	No Es Lo Mismo (as engineer)	Alejandro Sanz	Won	
2004	Best Engineered Album	No Es Lo Mismo (as engineer)	Alejandro Sanz	Won	
2005	Record of the Year	"Tú No Tienes Alma" (as engineer)	Alejandro Sanz	Won	
2005	Best Ranchero Album	México En La Piel (as engineer)	Luis Miguel	Won	
2007	Album of the Year	El Tren de los Momentos (as engineer)	Alejandro Sanz	Nominated	
2009	Best Rock Solo Vocal Album	Miedo Escénico (as engineer)	Beto Cuevas	Nominated	
2013	Album of the Year	La Música No Se Toca (as engineer)	Alejandro Sanz	Nominated	
2013	Best Contemporary Pop Vocal Album	La Música No Se Toca (as engineer)	Alejandro Sanz	Won	
2014	Album of the Year	MultiViral (as engineer)	Calle 13	Nominated	
2014	Best Urban Music Album	MultiViral (as engineer)	Calle 13	Won	
2015	Album of the Year	Sirope (as engineer)	Alejandro Sanz	Nominated	
2015	Best Contemporary Pop Vocal Album	Sirope (as engineer)	Alejandro Sanz	Won	
2016	Record of the Year	"Iguales" (as engineer)	Diego Torres	Nominated	
2016	Album of the Year	Buena Vida (as engineer)	Diego Torres	Nominated	
2016	Best Traditional Pop Vocal Album	Buena Vida (as engineer)	Diego Torres	Nominated	
2016	Best Alternative Music Album	L.H.O.N. (as engineer)	Illya Kuryaki & The Valderramas	Won	
2016	Producer of the Year	Rafa Sardina		Nominated	
2017	Record of the Year	"Quiero Que Vuelvas" (as engineer)	Alejandro Fernández	Nominated	
2017	Best Contemporary Pop Vocal Album	Rompiendo Fronteras	Alejandro Fernández	Nominated	
2018	Best Engineered Album	50 Años Tocando Para Ti (as engineer)	Orquesta Filarmónica de Bogotá	Won	
2019	Album of the Year	#ElDisco (as engineer)	Alejandro Sanz	Nominated	
2019	Best Contemporary Pop Vocal Album	#ElDisco (as engineer)	Alejandro Sanz	Nominated	
2019	Record of the Year	"No Tengo Nada" (as engineer)	Alejandro Sanz	Nominated	
2019	Best Ranchero/Mariachi Album	Indestructible (as engineer and producer)	Flor de Toloache	Nominated	
2019	Best Singer-Songwriter Album	Amor Presente (as engineer)	Leonel García	Nominated	
2019	Producer of the Year	Rafa Sardina		Nominated	
2020	Record of the Year	"Contigo" (as engineer)	Alejandro Sanz	Won	
2020	Best Traditional Pop Vocal Album	Mirándote A Los Ojos (as engineer)	José Luis Perales	Nominated	
2020	Best Ranchero/Mariachi Album	Hecho En México (as engineer)	Alejandro Fernández	Won	
2021	Best Tango Album	Tinto Tango Plays Piazzolla (as producer)	Tinto Tango	Won	
2023	Best Alternative Music Album	Bolero Apocalíptico (as producer and engineer)	Monsieur Periné	Won	
