= La Música No Se Toca =

Studio album by Alejandro Sanz
- Released: September 25, 2012
- Recorded: 2011–2012
- Studios: Eareye Studios; Mad Studio; Noisematch Studios; The Hit Factory-Critiera (Miami, Florida); Soundworks Recording Studio (New York City)
- Genre: Latin pop · pop rock · Latin rock · Alternative rock
- Length: 55:31
- Languages: Spanish and English
- Label: Universal Music Latino · Universal Music Spain
- Producer: Alejandro Sanz · Julio Reyes

Alejandro Sanz chronology
Colección Definitiva (2011)	La Música No Se Toca (2012)	Sirope (2015)

Singles from La Música No Se Toca
- 1. "No Me Compares" Released: June 25, 2012; 2. "Se Vende" Released: September 17, 2012; 3. "Mi Marciana" Released: November 12, 2012; 4. "Irrepetível" Released: January 30, 2013; 5. "Camino De Rosas" Released: February 11, 2013

La Música No Se Toca (English: The music is not touched) is the tenth studio album recorded by Spanish singer-songwriter Alejandro Sanz. It was produced by himself alongside Colombian Grammy award winner Julio C. Reyes. It was released by Universal Music Latino and Universal Music Spain on September 25, 2012. This album is the follow-up to the Grammy Award-winning album Paraíso Express (2009). It was nominated for Pop Album of the Year at the Premio Lo Nuestro 2013.

== Singles ==
- "No Me Compares" was released as the album's lead single on June 25, 2012. The song became a good hit on worldwide charts, becoming Sanz's first-ever number-one single with Universal Music Group. It stayed at number one for twelve consecutive weeks. A Brazilian-Portuguese version, named "Não Me Compares", was released only in Brazil on December 1, 2012, featured the Brazilian singer Ivete Sangalo. The music video was released on December 18.
- "Se Vende" was released as the album's second single on September 17, 2012.
- "Mi Marciana" was released as the album's third single on November 12, 2012. On December 21, he released a lyric video for the song.
- "Irrepetível", featured Brazilian singer Ana Carolina, was released as fourth single on January 30, 2013, only in Brazil.

=== Other songs ===
"La Música No Se Toca", first track of the album, entered the Spanish chart at number 42.

== Track listing ==
No.	Title	Writer(s)	Producer(s)	Length
1.	"La Música No Se Toca"	Sanz	Sanz, Reyes	4:51
2.	"Yo Te Traigo... 20 Años"	Sanz	Sanz, Reyes	3:45
3.	"No Me Compares"	Sanz	Sanz, Reyes	4:42
4.	"Llamando a la Mujer Acción"	Sanz	Sanz, Reyes	3:50
5.	"Mi Marciana"	Sanz	Sanz, Reyes	4:58
6.	"Camino de Rosas"	Sanz	Sanz, Reyes	4:23
7.	"Se Vende"	Sanz	Sanz, Reyes	3:55
8.	"Cómo Decir Sin Andar Diciendo"	Sanz	Sanz, Reyes	4:28
9.	"Camino a Casa"	Sanz	Sanz, Reyes	4:36
10.	"Nena"	Sanz	Sanz, Reyes	4:17
11.	"Bailo Con Vos"	Sanz	Sanz, Reyes	3:32
12.	"Me Sumerjo"	Sanz	Sanz, Reyes	3:51
13.	"Para Decirle Adiós"	Sanz, Schajris	Sanz, Reyes	5:13
14.	"Down" (featuring. Fat Joe/Arsenelli)	Sanz	Sanz, Reyes	4:26

Brazilian bonus edition
No.	Title	Writer(s)	Producer(s)	Length
15.	"Não Me Compares (No Me Compares)" (featuring Ivete Sangalo)	Sanz	Sanz, Reyes	4:42
16.	"Irrepetivel" (featuring Ana Carolina)	Sanz	Sanz, Reyes	3:40
17.	"Bailo Con Vos" (featuring Roberta Sá)	Sanz	Sanz, Reyes	3:21

== Production credits ==
- Producido por: Julio Reyes Copello y Alejandro Sanz
- Ingenieros de Grabacion: Edgar Barrera, Julio Reyes Copello, Lee Levin, Alejandro Sanz, Javier Garza, Javier Limon, Rafa Sardina, Juan Pablo Vega, Alonso Arreola, Samuel Torres, Dan Warner, Kamilo Krate, Sebastian de Peyrecave.
- Mezclado por: Sebastian Krys y Rafa Sardina.
- Arreglos y Programacion: Julio Reyes Copello, Marcos Sanchez, Javier Limon, Juan Pablo Vega, Samuel Torres.
- Programacion Adicional: Sebastian de Peyrecave
- Arreglos de Metales: Samuel Torres, Julio Reyes Copello
- Masterizado por: Antonio Baglio

== Charts ==
=== Weekly charts ===
Chart (2012)	Peak position
Ecuadorian Album Chart	2
Mexican Albums Chart	1
Portuguese Albums (AFP)	29
Spanish Albums (Promusicae)	1
US Billboard 200	26
US Top Latin Albums (Billboard)	1
US Latin Pop Albums (Billboard)	1
Venezuelan Albums (Recordland)	6

Weekly chart performance for La Música No Se Toca 10 Aniversario
Chart (2022)	Peak position
Spanish Albums (Promusicae)	47

=== Year-end charts ===
Chart (2012)	Position
Spanish Albums (PROMUSICAE)	3
US Top Latin Albums (Billboard)	22
Chart (2013)	Position
Spanish Albums (PROMUSICAE)	3
US Top Latin Albums (Billboard)	10

== Sales and certifications ==
Region	Certification	Certified units/sales
Argentina (CAPIF)	2× Platinum	80,000^{^}
Colombia	2× Platinum	
Ecuador	Gold	4,000
Mexico (AMPROFON)	2× Platinum+Gold	150,000^{^}
Peru	Gold	5,000
Spain (Promusicae)	5× Platinum	200,000^{^}
United States (RIAA)	Gold (Latin)	50,000^{^}
Uruguay (CUD)	Gold	2,000^{^}
^{^} Shipments figures based on certification alone.
