= Paula Arenas =

Colombian pop singer-songwriter

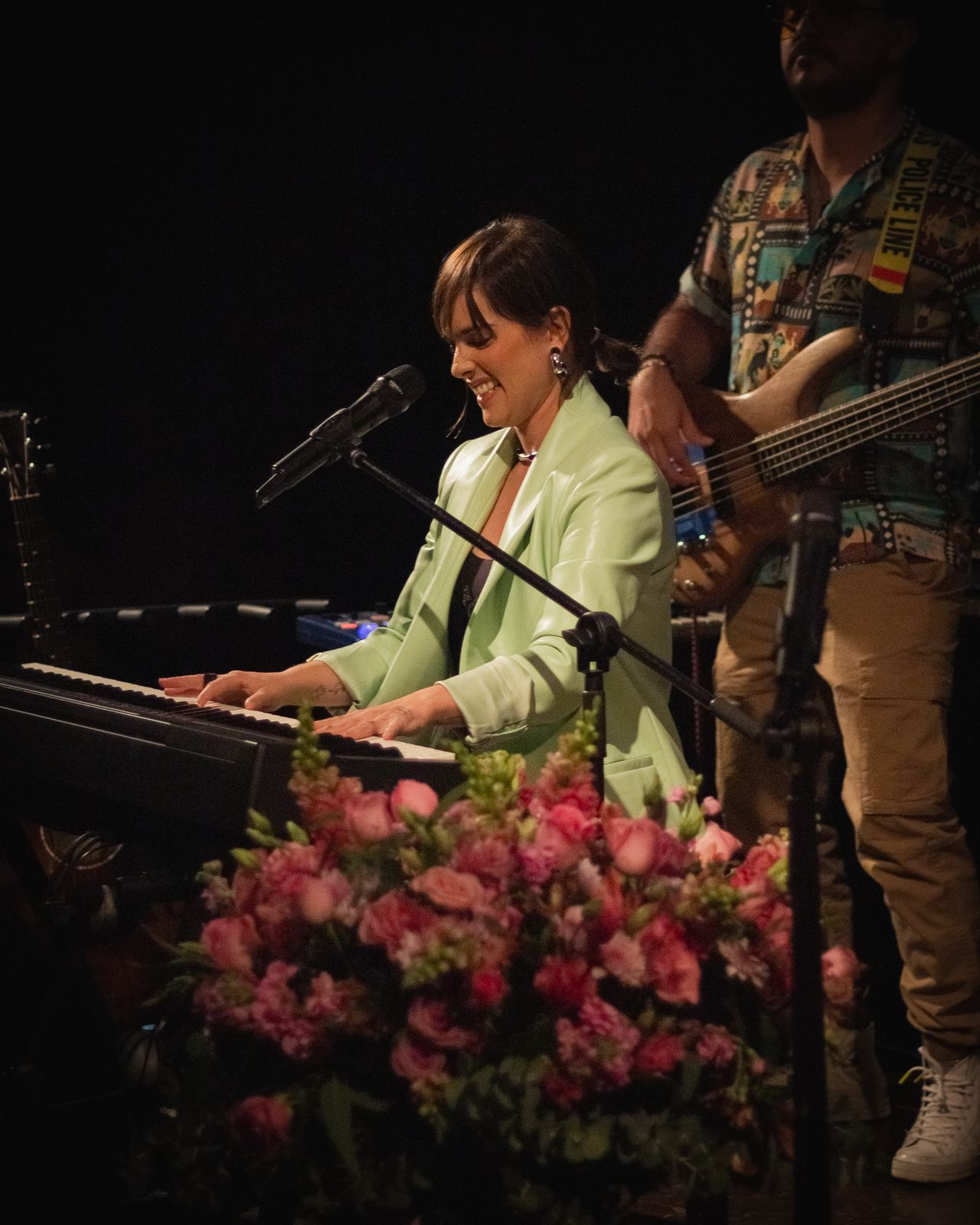
- Arenas performing in 2023

Background information
- Born: Paula Arenas Álvarez; May 1, 1988 (age 38); Bogotá, Colombia
- Genres: Pop; soul; jazz; alternative pop; RnB
- Occupations: singer-songwriter, musician
- Instruments: vocals, guitar, piano
- Years active: 2009–present
- Labels: Art House; Sony; Profesor
- Website: http://paulaarenas.com

Paula Arenas Álvarez (born May 1, 1988 in Bogotá, Colombia) is a Colombian pop singer-songwriter.

== Early life and career beginnings ==
Paula Arenas Álvarez was born on May 1, 1988 in Bogotá, Colombia. She has two siblings, named Federico and Mariana.

She discovered her love for singing in 1994 while watching Colombian telenovela "Cafe con aroma de mujer," the main character of which, Gaviota, would often sing in a way that Arenas tried to replicate, which earned her the nickname "Gaviotica." She then joined her school choir at age 7.

During her teenage year sand early adulthood, Arenas was seeking to pursue an education in music, applying to enroll in Colombian universities Los Andes and Pontificia Universidad Javeriana. After being rejected into both schools, she decided to dedicate herself fully to singing, and started singing popular song covers in local bars and restaurants.

After some time of covering songs she wasn't feeling passionate about, Arenas got hired to work at El Bandido Restaurant, where she started covering Frank Sinatra, and then went on to form a big band. It was during this time that she worked with Colombian singers Esteman and Juan Pablo Vega.

It was through Vega that Arenas became acquainted with Colombian record producer Julio Reyes Copello, to whom she often credits for helping her take singing and music seriously.

In January 2015, Arenas moved to Miami to pursue music full-time.

In 2019 she married Beto Perez, a Colombian artist and graphic designer from Barranquilla. During their wedding, Arenas performed her song "Una Vida Contigo" alongside Colombian singer-songwriter Santiago Cruz, and filmed its music video.

In 2020, the pair welcomed their first child, León.

== Career ==
=== 2011–2014: Independent breakthrough ===
Arenas debuted independently in November 2011 with a self-titled EP, which included singles such as "Me Hace Bien", "Sola", "Lo Que El Tiempo Dejó" (featuring Esteman), "Excesos" and "Un Día Cualquiera". "Lo Que El Tiempo Dejó" was a top 10 hit in Colombia.

In 2014 she was nominated in the New Artist of the Year category at the Colombian Nuestra Tierra Awards.

=== 2015–2017: Art House Records, new debut, and Matices ===
In 2015 she moved to Miami to start her music career over, after signing to Julio Reyes Copello's label, Art House Records.

In 2016 released her debut single called "Nada," produced by Reyes Copello. It received a generally positive response and support from the public, as well as peers such as Carla Morrison and Colombian singers Juanes and Fonseca.

In May 2016 she joined Alejandro Sanz as the opening act on his 'Sirope Tour' in Colombia.

In 2017 she released a single called 'Tanto, Tanto' followed by her third EP Matices, which earned her a Latin Grammy nomination in the Best New Artist category at the awards' 18th edition in 2017.

=== 2018–2020: Sony Music and Visceral ===
In 2018 she signed to Sony Music Colombia, and later that year released a single called "Tiempo al Viento" with Cuban singer Diana Fuentes. The song would serve as the lead single from her first full-length studio album, "Visceral," which was released in 2019 and received several Latin Grammy nominations at the awards' 20th edition, including Album of the Year and Best Traditional Pop Vocal Album. The second single off the album, "Buena Para Nada" was also nominated in the Best Pop Song category. Later that year, she released a music video for her song "Una Vida Contigo (feat. Santiago Cruz)". The music video was filmed during Arenas' wedding to Beto Perez, where she performed the song with Cruz.

Later that year, Arenas performed her song "Ahora Soy Libre" at the 20th Latin Grammy Awards Ceremony.

In 2020, Arenas received a Premios Nuestra Tierra nomination in the Album of the Year category for "Visceral."

=== 2021–2022: Profesor Records and Mis Amores ===
In 2021 she participated in the Latin Recording Academy "Ellas y su Música" tribute concert alongside Olga Tañón, Nella González and Vikky Carr, one of the artists honored in the concert. Later that same year, she released "A Tu Lado", the lead single off her EP "Mis Amores", which was recorded in 2020 in Arenas' home in Miami, amid the COVID-19 pandemic. The EP was released in May 2021 and received several Latin Grammy nominations, including Album of the Year and Best Traditional Pop Vocal Album. The albums lead single, "A Tu Lado" was also nominated in the Record of the Year category. Arenas was also invited to perform at the ceremony during the tribute to Armando Manzanero, algonside Carlos Rivera and Nella González. This also marked the first time Arenas was nominated for a Grammy award, with the EP receiving a nod in the Best Latin Pop Album category.

In 2022 she signed with Mexican Independent Label Profesor Records and released two singles: "Puro Sentimiento" with Colombian singer Manuel Medrano, in May, and "Un Día a la Vez" in October. In December of that year, she visited Mexico on a press tour, where she also joined mexican pop group Reik as their opening act on their Mexico City stop at Auditorio Nacional on their tour. She also opened for mexican pop group Matisse in Querétaro, and mexican singer-songwriter Ale Zéguer in Texcoco.

=== 2023–present: A Ciegas ===
In 2023 she released two more singles: "A Ciegas" in March, and "Déjame Llorarte", alongside Reik's frontman Jesús Navarro, in April. Both singles, along with her previous two releases, would become part of her second studio album, also titled "A Ciegas", released on May 19, 2023. The album spawned a mini tour across Miami, Colombia and Mexico, which marked Arenas' first headlining tour, after joining mexican singer Carlos Rivera as an opening act on his 3 shows in Mexico City's Auditorio Nacional. In May of that year, "Puro Sentimiento" received a nomination for Best Pop Song at that year's Premios Nuestra Tierra. In September of that year, Arenas received 4 Latin Grammy nominations at the awards' 24th edition in the Album of the Year and Best Traditional Pop Vocal Album categories for "A Ciegas", as well as the Record of the Year and Best Pop Song for "Déjame Llorarte".

== Discography ==
=== Studio albums ===
Title	Album Details
Visceral (2019)	Released: May 10, 2019; Label: Art House; Format: Digital download
A Ciegas (2023)	Released: May 19, 2023; Label: El Profesor Records; Format: Digital download

=== Extended plays ===
Title	EP details
Paula Arenas (2011 EP)	Released: November 2011; Label: Independent; Format: Digital download
Paula Arenas (2012 EP)	Released: November 2012; Label: Independent; Format: Digital download, CD
Matices	Released: May 26, 2017; Label: Art House; Format: Digital download
Mis Amores	Released: May 28, 2021; Label: Independent; Format: Digital download

== Singles ==
Year	Song	Peak chart positions	Album
Year	Song	COL National-Report	Album
2011	"Me Hace Bien"	—	Paula Arenas (2011 EP)
2012	"Dejame"	—	Non-album single
2012	"Sola"	—	Paula Arenas (2012 EP)
2013	"Lo Que El Tiempo Dejó"	3	Non-album single
2013	"Excesos"	—	Non-album single
2014	"Un Día Cualquiera"	—	Non-album single
2016	"Nada"	—	Matices/Visceral
2016	"Ahora Soy Libre"	—	Matices/Visceral
2016	"Hoy"	—	Matices/Visceral
2017	"Tanto Tanto"	—	Matices/Visceral
2017	"Bandida"	—	Matices/Visceral
2017	"Es Natural"	—	Visceral
2018	"Tiempo al Viento" (Paula Arenas and Diana Fuentes)	–	Visceral
2019	"Buena Para Nada"	–	Visceral
2021	"A Tu Lado"	–	Mis Amores
2021	"Los Caminos de la Vida"	–	Mis Amores
2022	"Volando Bajito"	–	Non-album single
2022	"Puro Sentimiento" (Paula Arenas and Manuel Medrano)	–	"A Ciegas"
2022	"Un Dia a la Vez"	–	"A Ciegas"
2023	"A Ciegas"	–	"A Ciegas"
2023	"Déjame Llorarte" (Paula Arenas & Jesús Navarro)	–	"A Ciegas"
"—" denotes releases that did not chart or were not released.

== Music videos ==
Title	Year
"Me Hace Bien"	2011
"Sola"	2012
"Lo Que El Tiempo Dejó"	2013
"Excesos"	2013
"Un Día Cualquiera"	2014
"Nada"	2016
"Tanto Tanto"	2017
"Tiempo al Viento"	2018
"Buena Para Nada"	2019
"Una Vida Contigo"	2019
"A Tu Lado"	2021
"León"	2021
"Volando Bajito"	2022
"Puro Sentimiento"	2022
"Un Día a la Vez"	2022
"A Ciegas"	2023
"Déjame Llorarte"	2023

== Awards and nominations ==
=== Grammy Awards ===
A Grammy Award is an accolade by The Recording Academy to recognize outstanding achievement in the music industry.

Year	Nominee / work	Award	Result	Ref.
2022	Mis Amores	Best Latin Pop Album	Nominated	
2024	A Ciegas	Best Latin Pop Album	Pending	

=== Latin Grammy Awards ===
A Latin Grammy Award is an accolade by the Latin Academy of Recording Arts & Sciences to recognize outstanding achievement in the music industry.

Year	Nominee / work	Award	Result	Ref.
2017	Paula Arenas	Best New Artist	Nominated	
2019	Visceral	Album of the Year	Nominated	
2019	Visceral	Best Traditional Pop Vocal Album	Nominated	
2019	"Buena Para Nada"	Best Pop Song	Nominated	
2021	Mis Amores	Album of the Year	Nominated	
2021	Mis Amores	Best Traditional Pop Vocal Album	Nominated	
2021	"A Tu Lado"	Record of the Year	Nominated	
2023	A Ciegas	Album of the Year	Pending	
2023	A Ciegas	Best Traditional Pop Vocal Album	Pending	
2023	"Déjame Llorarte"	Record of the Year	Pending	
2023	"Déjame Llorarte"	Best Pop Song	Pending	

=== Premios Nuestra Tierra ===
a Premio Nuestra Tierra is an accolade by RCN Radio and RCN Television to recognize outstanding achievements for artists in the Colombian music industry.

Year	Nominee / work	Award	Result	Ref.
2014	Paula Arenas	New Artist of the Year	Nominated	
2020	Visceral	Album of the Year	Nominated	
2023	"Puro Sentimiento"^{[a]}	Best Pop Song	Nominated	

Notes

- ^{^[a]} Arenas shared the nomination with Manuel Medrano, her collaborator on the song.
