= Latin Grammy Award for Record of the Year =

Latin Grammy Award category

- "Niño" by Milo J is the most recent recipient
- Awarded for: quality vocal or instrumental recording tracks
- Country: United States
- Presented by: The Latin Recording Academy
- First award: 2000
- Currently held by: Milo J – "Niño" (2026)
- Website: latingrammy.com (in Spanish, English, and Portuguese)

The Latin Grammy Award for Record of the Year is an honor presented annually at the Latin Grammy Awards, a ceremony that recognizes excellence and creates a wider awareness of cultural diversity and contributions of Latin recording artists in the United States and internationally. The award is given to the performers, producers, audio engineers and mastering engineer for new songs in Spanish or Portuguese language. The songs included on an album released the previous year of submission are also eligible only if they have not been submitted to competition before. Instrumental songs are also eligible. Due to the increasing musical changes in the industry, from 2012 the category includes 10 nominees, thanks to a restructuring by the academy of the four general categories: Song of the Year, Album of the Year, Best New Artist and Record of the Year.

Alejandro Sanz has won the most awards in the category with eight wins out of eleven nominations. Jorge Drexler has won the award three times. Drexler is followed by Calle 13, Juanes and Shakira with two winning songs. "Livin' la Vida Loca" and "Despacito" by Puerto Rican singers Ricky Martin, and Luis Fonsi and Daddy Yankee, respectively, are the only songs to be nominated for this award in its Spanish-language version and to receive the same distinction for the English language versions. Most nominated songs were recorded in Spanish language, though "Esperando Na Janela" by Gilberto Gil, "Já Sei Namorar" by Tribalistas, "A Festa" by Maria Rita, "Dois Rios" by Skank, "Arlequim Desconhecido" by Ivan Lins and The Metropole Orchestra, "Tua" by Maria Bethânia, "Atrás de Porta" by Ivete Sangalo, "Um Abraçaço" by Caetano Veloso, "Vidas Pra Contar" by Djavan, and "É Fake (Homem Barato)" by Anaadi, recorded in Portuguese language, were also nominated, while "Talvez" by Caetano Veloso and Tom Veloso won in 2021. In 2017, Colombian artist Maluma became the first performer to have three nominated songs in the same year. Rafael Arcaute, Gustavo Santaolalla and Lulo Pérez are the most awarded producers, with two wins, while Benny Faccone, Aníbal Kerpel and Thom Russo have received the most awards as engineers/mixers, with two each.

== Recipients ==
An asterisk (*) indicates the composition won Song of the Year as well.

Year^{[I]}	Winner(s)	Work	Nominees
2000	Santana featuring Maná · Fernando Olvera and K. C. Porter, producers · Benny Faccone, engineer/mixer	"Corazón Espinado"	"Dímelo" – Marc Anthony (Cory Rooney, producer; Tony Maserati & Robb Williams, engineers/mixers); "Tiempos" – Rubén Blades (Rubén Blades, Walter Flores, Edín Solís & Carlos Vargas, producers; Roberto Delgado, Oscar Marín & Alexander Orozco, engineers/mixers); "Livin' la Vida Loca" – Ricky Martin (Desmond Child & Robi Draco Rosa, producers; Charles Dye, engineers/mixers); "Fruta Fresca" – Carlos Vives (Emilio Estefan, Jr. & Juan Vicente Zambrano, producers; Marcelo Añez, Scott Canto, Alfred Figueroa, Javier Garza, Carlos Nieto, Freddy Piñero, Jr., Carlos Santos, Cesar Sogbe & Ron Taylor, engineers/mixers)
2001	Alejandro Sanz · Emanuele Ruffinengo, producer · Roberto Cantele and Roberto Maccagno, engineers/mixers	"El Alma al Aire"	"Pero Me Acuerdo de Ti" – Christina Aguilera (Rudy Pérez, producer; "Bassy" Bob Brockman, Mike Couzzi, Felipe Tichauer & Bruce Weeden, engineers/mixers); "El Album" – Aterciopelados (Héctor Buitrago, producer; Mauricio Canó, Chris Lawson & Federico López, engineers/mixers); "Esperando Na Janela" – Gilberto Gil (Gilberto Gil, producer; Vitor Farias & Marcelo Machado, engineers/mixers); "Fíjate Bien" – Juanes (Gustavo Santaolalla, producer; Aníbal Kerpel & Tom Russo, engineers/mixers)
2002	Alejandro Sanz · Humberto Gatica, producer · Chris Brook and Eric Schilling, engineers/mixers	"Y Sólo Se Me Ocurre Amarte"	"La Negra Tiene Tumbao" – Celia Cruz (Sergio George, producer; Jon Fausty, engineer/mixer); "Mentira" – La Ley (Humberto Gatica & Kenny O'Brien, producers; Humberto Gatica, Cristian Robles & Eric Shilling, engineers/mixers); "Déjame Entrar" – Carlos Vives (Andrés Castro, Emilio Estefan, Jr., Sebastian Krys & Carlos Vives, producers; Javier Garza, engineer/mixer); "Se Me Olvidó" – Gian Marco Zignago (Emilio Estefan, Jr. & Archie Peña, producers; Javier Garza, engineer/mixer)
2003	Juanes · Gustavo Santaolalla, producer · Aníbal Kerpel and Thom Russo, engineers.	"Es Por Ti"	"Mi Primer Millón" – Bacilos (Sergio George, producer; Jon Fausty, engineers); "Hasta Que Vuelvas" – Luis Miguel (Luis Miguel & Bebu Silvetti, producers; Alfredo Mathus, Rafa Sardina & Al Schmitt, engineers); "Frijolero" – Molotov (Gustavo Santaolalla, producer; Robert Carranza & Aníbal Kerpel, engineers); "Já Sei Namorar" – Tribalistas (Arnaldo Antunes, Carlinhos Brown, Marisa Monte & Alê Siqueira, producers; Flavio De Souza, William Jr., Antoine Midani, Marisa Monte & Alê Siqueira, engineers)
2004	Alejandro Sanz · Lulo Pérez, producer · Mick Guzauski and Rafa Sardina, engineers/mixers	"No Es Lo Mismo"	"Lágrimas Negras" – Bebo & Cigala (Javier Limón & Fernando Trueba, producers; Pepe Loeches, engineers/mixers); "A Festa" – Maria Rita (Tom Capone, Marco da Costa & Maria Rita, producers; Álvaro Alencar & Tom Capone, engineers/mixers); "Más y Más" – Robi Draco Rosa (George Noriega & Robi Draco Rosa, producers; Seth Atkins Horan & Chris Lord-Alge, engineers/mixers); "Dois Rios" – Skank (Tom Capone & Skank, producer; Álvaro Alencar, Tom Capone, Renato Cipriano and Bruno Ferretti, engineers/mixers); "Andar Conmigo" – Julieta Venegas (Coti Sorokin & Julieta Venegas, producers; Coti Sorokin & Matías Sorokin, engineers/mixers)
2005 ·	Alejandro Sanz · Lulo Pérez, producer · Carlos Alvarez, Oscar Vinader and Rafa Sardina, engineers/mixers	"Tu No Tienes Alma"	"Malo" – Bebe (Carlos Jean, producer; José Luis Crespo & Raúl Quílez, engineers/mixers); "Gasolina" – Daddy Yankee (Luny Tunes, producer; Echo & Luny Tunes, engineers/mixers); "Amor del Bueno" – Reyli (Mario Domm & Reyli, productores; Gabriel Castañón, Luis Cortez, Mario Domm, Humberto Gatica, Luis Gil & Alex Rodríguez, engineers/mixers); "Duele el Amor" – Aleks Syntek featuring Ana Torroja (Aleks Syntek, producer; Armando Ávila, Áureo Baqueiro, Miguel Castro, Luis Gil, Juan Carlos Moguel, Carlos Murgía & Aleks Syntek, engineers/mixers)
2006	Shakira featuring Alejandro Sanz · Léster Méndez & Shakira, producers · Gustavo Celis, Kevin Killen & Ron Jabobs, engineers/mixers	"La Tortura"	"Acompáñame a Estar Solo" – Ricardo Arjona (Lee Levin, Tommy Torres & Dan Warner producers; Steve Churchyard, Mick Guzauski, David Hall, Lee Levin, Tommy Torres and Dan Warner, engineers/mixers); "Te Mando Flores" – Fonseca (Bernardo Ossa, producer; Boris Milán & Bernardo Ossa, engineers/mixers); "Mas Que Nada" – Sérgio Mendes featuring The Black Eyed Peas (will.i.am, producer; Tony Maserati y Jason Villaroman, engineers/mixers); "Me Voy" – Julieta Venegas (Cachorro López, producer; Sebastian Schon, Cesar Sogbe, Coti Sorokin & Matias Sorokin, engineers/mixers)
2007	Juan Luis Guerra · Allan Leschhorn, producer · Luis Mansilla and Ronnie Torres, engineers/mixers	"La Llave de Mi Corazón"	"Bello Embustero" – Beyoncé and Shakira (Eduardo Cabra, Olgui Chirino, Beyoncé Knowles, Rudy Pérez, Shakira and Stargate, producers; Roberto Almodovar, Jim Caruana, Gustavo Celis, Jean-Marie Horvat, Stargate & John Weston, engineers/mixers); "Nena" – Miguel Bosé featuring Paulina Rubio (Miguel Bosé & Carlos Jean, producers; Andy Bradfield, engineers/mixers); "La Excepción" – Gustavo Cerati (Gustavo Cerati & Tweety González, producers; Héctor Castillo, Uriel Dorfman & Tweety González, engineers/mixers); "Tu Recuerdo" – Ricky Martin featuring La Mari and Tommy Torres (Tommy Torres, producer; Raphael Alkins, Gustavo Borner, Andrés Casanova, Bob Clearmountain y Brett Dicus, engineers/mixers)
2008	Juanes · Gustavo Santaolalla, producer · Aníbal Kerpel and Thom Russo, engineers/mixers	"Me Enamora"	"Vive Ya! (Vivere)" – Andrea Bocelli and Laura Pausini (Humberto Gatica & Tony Reis, producers; Humberto Gatica & Alejandro Rodríguez, engineers/mixers); "Bonita" – Cabas (Cabas & Carlos Jean, producers; José Luis Crespo & Raúl Quílez, engineers/mixers); "Volver a Comenzar" – Café Tacvba (Café Tacuba, Tony Peluso & Gustavo Santaolalla, producers; Emmanuel del Real & Tony Peluso, engineers/mixers); "El Presente" – Julieta Venegas (Jaques Morelenbaum & Julieta Venegas, producers; Gustavo Borner, engineers/mixers)
2009	Calle 13 featuring Café Tacvba · Eduardo Cabra & René Pérez, producers · Ivan Gutierrez, Ramon Martínez, Edgardo Matta & Carlos Velasquez, engineers/mixers.	"No Hay Nadie Como Tú"	"Aquí Estoy Yo" – Luis Fonsi featuring David Bisbal, Noel Schajris and Aleks Syntek (Luis Fonsi & Sebastian Krys, producers; Sebastian Krys, Lee Levin, Luis Alfonso Rodríguez, Andrés Saavedra, Orlando Vitto & Dan Warner, engineers/mixers); "Arlequim Desconhecido" – Ivan Lins and The Metropole Orchestra (Ivan Lins & Vince Mendoza, producers; Rich Breen & Paul Pouwer, engineers/mixers); "Si No Vas a Cocinar" – José Lugo Orchestra featuring Gilberto Santa Rosa (José Lugo, producer; Rolando Alejandro, Jon Fausty & Ronnie Torres, engineers/mixers); "En Cambio No" – Laura Pausini (Paolo Carta & Laura Pausini, producers; Paolo Carta & Steve Lyon, engineers/mixers)
2010	Camila · Mario Domm, producer · Gabriel Castañón, Benny Faccone & Peter Mokran, engineers/mixers	"Mientes"	"Tua" – Maria Bethânia (Maria Bethânia, producer; Moogie Canazio & Gabriel Pinheiro, engineers/mixers); "Se Me Hizo Fácil" – Concha Buika (Javier Limón, producer; Melisa Nanni & Salomé Limón, engineers/mixers); "Una Canción Me Trajo Hasta Aquí" – Jorge Drexler (Matías Cella, producer; Carles Campi Campón, Matías Cella & Alberto Estela, engineers/mixers); "Desde Cuándo" – Alejandro Sanz (Tommy Torres, producer; Steve Churchyard, Mike Couzzi, Lee Levin, Yres Saavedra, Tommy Torres & Dan Warner, engineers/mixers; Bob Clearmountain, mastering engineer)
2011	Calle 13 featuring Totó la Momposina, Susana Baca and Maria Rita · Rafa Arcaute and Calle 13, producer · Felipe Alvarez, Arcaute, Eduardo Cabra, David Cárdenas, Iván Gutiérrez, Ramón Martínez, Edgardo Matta, Daniel Ovie & Carlos Velazquez, engineers/mixers.	"Latinoamérica"	"Tan Sólo Tú" – Franco De Vita featuring Alejandra Guzmán (David Cabrera, Franco De Vita, producers; Juan Pablo Falluca, Sebastian Krys, engineers/mixers); "Gritar" – Luis Fonsi (Armando Avila, producer; Armando Avila, Luis Fonsi, Sebastian Krys, Juan Carlos Moguel, Francisco Oroz, Pepe Ortega, engineers/mixers); "Golpes en el Corazón" – Los Tigres del Norte featuring Paulina Rubio (Gustavo Borner, Los Tigres Del Norte, producers; Nick Baxter, Borner, Juan Pablo Falluca, Justin Moshkevich, engineers/mixers); "Lo Mejor de Mi Vida Eres Tú" – Ricky Martin featuring Natalia Jiménez (Desmond Child, producer; Carlos Álvarez, Chris Baseford, Bob Clearmountain, Jules Gondar, Enrique Larreal, J.C. Monterrosa, Jon Vella, engineers/mixers)
2012	Jesse & Joy · Martin Terefe, producer · Ainsley Adams, Dyre Gormsen, Thomas Juth, engineers/mixers	"¡Corre!"	"Fuiste Tú" – Ricardo Arjona featuring Gaby Moreno (Lee Levin & Dan Warner, producers; Carlos Cabral Jr., Isaías García, Lee Levin, Matt Rollings, Jerald Romero, Dan Rudin, David Thoener, Tommy Torres & Dan Warner, engineers/mixers); "Calentura" – ChocQuibTown featuring Tego Calderón and Zully Murillo (Andrés Castro & Miguel "Slow" Martínez, producers; Edgar Barrera, Carlos "El Loco" Bedoya, Scott Canto, Andrés Castro, Francisco "Kiko" Castro, Javier Garza, Tony Mardini, Guillermo Martínez, Ramón Martínez, Andrés Saavedra & Carlos Velásquez, engineers/mixers); "Que Te Vaya Mal" – Kany García (Julio Reyes Copello, producer; Edgar Barrera, Sebastian De Peyrecave, Javier Garza & Julio Reyes Copello, engineers/mixers); "En El Cielo No Hay Hospital" – Juan Luis Guerra (Juan Luis Guerra & Janina Rosado, producers; Allan Leschhorn, engineers/mixers); "Azul Sabina" – Juanes featuring Joaquín Sabina (Juan Luis Guerra, producer; Gustavo Borner, engineers/mixers); "Hasta Que Te Conocí" – Maná (Alex González, Fher Olvera & Sergio Vallín, producers; Benny Faccone, engineers/mixers); "Atrás da Porta" – Ivete Sangalo (Rafael Dragaud & Roberto Talma, producers; Vitor Farias, engineers/mixers); "No Me Compares" – Alejandro Sanz (Julio Reyes Copello & Alejandro Sanz, producers; Edgar Barrera, Sebastian Krys & Julio Reyes Copello, engineers/mixers); "Bésame Mucho" – Zoé (Phil Vinall & Zoé, producers; Gustavo Borner, Eduardo del Águila, Juan Pablo Falluca, Phil Vinall & Zoé, engineers/mixers)
2013	Marc Anthony · Marc Anthony, Sergio George & Julio Reyes Copello, producer · Juan Mario Aracil, Julio Reyes Copello, Carlos Alvarez & Sergio George, engineers/mixers · Tom Coyne, mastering	"Vivir Mi Vida"	"Tanto" – Pablo Alborán (Pablo Alborán, producer; Bori Alarcón & Javier García, engineers/mixers); "La Nave del Olvido" – Buika (Eli Wolf, record producer; Ted Tuthill, recording engineer; Carlos Álvarez, mixer; Mike Fuller, mastering); "Lo Mejor Que Hay En Mi Vida" – Andrés Cepeda (Andrés Cepeda, José Gaviria & Fernando "Toby" Tobón, producers; José Gaviria, Lee Levin & Fernando "Toby" Tobón, engineers/mixers; Boris Milán, mastering); "Bachata Rosa" – Natalie Cole featuring Juan Luis Guerra (Rudy Pérez & Juan Luis Guerra, producers; Bruce Weeden, Jorge Vivo, David Lopez y Andrés Bermudez, engineers/mixers; Vlado Meller, mastering); "Desde Lejos" – Santiago Cruz (Santiago Cruz & Nacho Mañó, producers; Nacho Mañó & Frankie Tontoh, engineers/mixers); "Más y Más" – Draco Rosa featuring Ricky Martin (George Noriega & Draco Rosa, producers; Dave Clauss, Héctor Espinosa, Benny Faccone, Seth Atkins Horan, Nelson "Gazu" Jaime, Allan Leschhorn, Fernando Quintana, Fabián Serrano & Sadaharu Yagi, engineers/mixers; Bob Ludwig, mastering); "Mi Marciana" – Alejandro Sanz (Julio Reyes Copello & Alejandro Sanz, producers; Javier Garza & Alejandro Sanz, engineers/mixers; Sebastian Krys, mastering); "Um Abraçaço" – Caetano Veloso (Pedro Sá & Moreno Veloso, producers; Moreno Veloso & Daniel Carvalho, engineers/mixers; Ricardo Garcia, mastering); "Volví a Nacer" – Carlos Vives (Andrés Castro & Carlos Vives, producers; Edgar Barrera, Scott Canto, Andrés Castro, Francisco 'Kiko' Castro, Andrés Landinez, Shafik Palis, Curt Schneider & Camilo Silva, engineers/mixers Curt Schneider, mastering)
2014	Jorge Drexler featuring Ana Tijoux · Carles Campi Campón, Jorge Drexler, Mario Galeano & Sebastián Merlín, producers · Carlos Barros, Carles Campi Campón, Néstor Cifuentes, Héctor Quídea, José María Rosillo & Simón Vélez, engineers/mixers · Bori Alarcón, mastering	"Universos Paralelos"	"Dónde está el Amor" – Pablo Alborán featuring Jesse & Joy (Pablo Alborán, producer; Bori Alarcón & Javier García, engineers/mixers); "Cambio de Piel" – Marc Anthony (Marc Anthony, Sergio George & Julio Reyes Copello, producers; Jim Annunziato & Juan Mario "Mayito" Aracil, recording engineers; Carlos Álvarez, mixer; Tom Coyne, mastering); "La Vida (Respira el Momento)" – Calle 13 (Eduardo Cabra, producer; John Blais, Michael Brauer & Rich Costey, engineers/mixers; Rich Costey, mastering); "Decidiste Dejarme" – Camila (Mario Domm, producer; Paul Forat, Ginés Carrión Espí, Carlos Murguía & Vincente Garcia, engineers/mixers); "Llegaste Tú" – Luis Fonsi featuring Juan Luis Guerra (Martin Terefe, producer; Thomas Juth, Sam Keyte, Allan Leschhorn, Cass Lowe, Baeho "Bobby" Shin, Ronnie Torres, Andreas Wittich, engineers/mixers); "Bailando" – Enrique Iglesias featuring Descemer Bueno and Gente De Zona (Carlos Paucar, producer; Markel Barsagaz, Carlos Bedoya, Delbert Bowers, Bruno Canale, Benny Faccone, Chris Galland, Serban Ghenea, John Hanes, Marc Lee, Manny Marroquin, Roberto "Tito" Vazquez, engineers/mixers; Aya Merrill & Tom Coyne, mastering); "Darte un Beso" – Prince Royce (Carlos Alvarez, producer; Carlos Alvarez, Josh Cumbee, Fernando Garibay, Toby Gad, Jason Groucott, Daniel Kyriakides, Erik Madrid, Alfredo Matheus & Robert Orton, engineers/mixers; Tom Coyne, mastering); "Cuando Nos Volvamos a Encontrar" – Carlos Vives featuring Marc Anthony (Andrés Castro & Carlos Vives, record producers; Edgar Barrera, Scott Canto, Andrés Castro, Francisco "Kiko" Castro, Javier Garza, Carlos Huertas, Shafik Palis, Julio Reyes & Curt Schneider, recording engineers; Curt Schneider, mixer; Tom Coyne, mastering engineer); "El Mar de Sus Ojos" – Carlos Vives featuring ChocQuibTown (Carlos Vives & Andrés Castro, producers; Curt Schneider, engineer/mixer; Tom Coyne, mastering)
2015	Natalia Lafourcade · Natalia Lafourcade & Cachorro López, producers · Eduardo Del Águila, Andrés Borda, Alan Ortiz Grande, Demián Nava, Alan Saucedo, Sebastián Schon & Cesar Sogbe, engineers/mixers · José Blanco, mastering	"Hasta la Raíz"	"Fiesta" – Bomba Estéreo (Ricky Reed & Joe London, producers; Nicolás Donado, Drew Kapner, Felipe Leal, Manny Marroquin, Ethan Shumaker, engineers/mixers; Mike Fuller, mastering); "Encanto" – Miguel Bosé (Andrew Frampton, producer; Andrew Frampton & Pepo Scherman, engineers; Dan Frampton, mixer; Antonio Baglio, mastering); "Será (Vida de Hombre)" – Café Quijano (Kenny O'Brien & Manuel Quijano, producers; Luis Villa, engineer; Luis Villa, mixer; Miguel Ángel González, mastering); "La Vida Entera" – Camila featuring Marco Antonio Solís (Mario Domm & Pablo Hurtado, producers; Gabriel Castañón, Mario Domm, Benny Faccone, Geoff Foster, Peter Mokran & Adrián Trujillo, engineers; Peter Mokran, mixer; Bernie Grundman, mastering); "Ella Es" – Leonel García featuring Jorge Drexler (Aureo Baqueiro, producer; Aureo Baqueiro, Steve Churchyard, Alan Saucedo & Curt Schneider, engineers; Curt Schneider, mixer; Gavin Lurssen, mastering engineer); "Tus Besos" – Juan Luis Guerra 4.40 (Juan Luis Guerra, producer; Edgar Barrera, Rafael Lazzaro & Allan Leschhorn, engineers; Allan Leschhorn & Ronnie Torres, mixers; Adam Ayan, mastering); "Disparo al Corazón" – Ricky Martin (Julio Reyes Copello, producer; Enrique Larreal, Lee Levin, Carlos Fernando López, Ricardo López Lalinde, Julio Reyes Copello, Guillermo Vadala & Dan Warner, engineers; Antonio Baglio, mastering); "Un Zombie a la Intemperie" – Alejandro Sanz (Sebastian Krys & Alejandro Sanz, producers; Sebastian Krys, engineer; Sebastian Krys & Rafa Sardina, mixers; Tom Coyne, mastering engineer); "Ese Camino" – Julieta Venegas (Cachorro López, Yamil Rezc & Julieta Venegas, producers; Ernesto García, Demián Nava & Sebastián Schon, engineers; Héctor Castillo, mixer; Sterling Sound Studios, mastering)
2016	Carlos Vives & Shakira · Andrés Castro, Luis Fernando Ochoa, Shakira & Carlos Vives, producers · Carlos Hernández Carbonell, Andrés Castro, Gustavo Celis, Luis Barrera Jr., Andre Nascimbeni & Dave Clauss, engineers/mixers · Adam Ayan, mastering.	"La Bicicleta"	"Cuestión de Esperar" – Pepe Aguilar (Pepe Aguilar, Francis Durán, Mauricio Durán & Yamil Rezc, producers; Norberto Islas, engineer; Sacha Triujeque, mixer; Tom Baker, mastering); "Se Puede Amar" – Pablo Alborán (Pablo Alborán, producer; Oscar Clavel, engineer/mixer/mastering); "Me Faltarás" – Andrea Bocelli (David Foster, Humberto Gatica & Tony Renis, producers; Humberto Gatica, Pierpaolo Guerrini & Martín Nessi, engineers/mixers; Vlado Meller, mastering); "Si Volveré" – Buika (Buika & Martin Terefe, producers; Oskar Winberg & Eduardo De La Paz, engineers/mixers; Geoff Pesche, mastering); "Vidas Pra Contar" – Djavan (Djavan, producer; Marcelo Saboia, engineer/mixer; Andre Días, mastering); "Duele el Corazón" – Enrique Iglesias featuring Wisin (Carlos Paucar, producer; Carlos Paucar, engineers/mixers; Tom Coyne, mastering); "Ecos de Amor" – Jesse & Joy (Jesse Huerta & Fraser T. Smith, producers; Beatriz Artola & Craig Silvey, engineers/mixers; John Davis, mastering); "Lado Derecho del Corazón" – Laura Pausini (Paolo Carta & Davide Rossi, producers; Nicola Fantozzi & Renato Cantele, engineers/mixers; Roberto Bartilucci, Maurizio Biancani & Enrico Capalbo, mastering); "Iguales" – Diego Torres (Rafa Arcaute & Julio Reyes Copello, producers; Rafael Arcaute, Rafa Sardina, Luis Barrera Jr, Javier Garza, Ricardo López Lalinde & Julio Reyes Copello, engineers/mixers; Antonio Baglio, mastering)
2017	Luis Fonsi featuring Daddy Yankee · Mauricio Rengifo & Andrés Torres, producers · Gaby Music, Mauricio Rengifo, Luis Saldarriaga & Andrés Torres, recording engineers · Jaycen Joshua, mixer · Dave Kutch, mastering.	"Despacito"	"La Flor de la Canela" – Rubén Blades (Manuel Garrido-Lecca, Edu Olivé Gomez, Mabela Martínez & Susana Roca Rey, producers; Edu Olivé Gomez, Ignacio Molino & Oscar Martín Santisteban Cole, recording engineers; Keith Morrison, mixer; Andrés Mayo, mastering); "El Surco" – Jorge Drexler (Manuel Garrido Lecca, Edu Olivé Gomez, Mabela Martínez & Susana Roca Rey, producers; Carles Campón, Edu Olivé Gomez & Oscar Martin Santisteban Cole, recording engineers; Keith Morrison, mixer; Andrés Mayo, mastering); "Quiero Que Vuelvas" – Alejandro Fernández (Áureo Baqueiro, producer/engineer; Rafa Sardina, mixer; Dave Kutch, mastering); "El Ratico" – Juanes featuring Kali Uchis (Juanes, Alejandro Patiño & Alejandro Ramírez, producers; Josh Gudwin, mixer; Tom Coyne, mastering); "Amárrame" – Mon Laferte featuring Juanes (Manú Jalil S. & Mon Laferte, producers; Eduardo del Águila & Alán Ortiz, recording engineers; Eduardo del Águila & Alejandro Patiño, engineers/mixers; Gonzalo González, mastering); "Felices los 4" – Maluma (Kevin ADG & Chan El Genio, producers; Chan El Genio, recording engineer; Alejandro "Mosty" Patiño, mixer; Chris Gehringer, mastering); "Vente Pa' Ca" – Ricky Martin featuring Maluma (Alexander Castillo & Julio Reyes Copello, record producers; Alexander Castillo, Natalia Ramírez & Julio Reyes Copello, recording engineers; Clint Gibbs, mixer; Gene Grimaldi, mastering engineer); "Guerra" – Residente (Residente & Trooko, producers; Rafael Arcaute, Alex Berdz & Phil Joly, recording engineer; Tom Elmhirst, mixer; Ted Jensen, mastering); "Chantaje" – Shakira featuring Maluma (Chan, Kevin Jiménez ADG, Maluma & Shakira, producers; Dave Clauss & Carlos Hernández Carbonell, recording engineer; Chan & Dave Clauss, mixers; Adam Ayan, mastering)
2018	Jorge Drexler · Carles Campi Campón & Jorge Drexler, producers · Carles Campi Campón & Ernesto García, recording engineers · Matías Cella, mixer · Fred Kevorkian, mastering	"Telefonía"	"No Vaya a Ser" – Pablo Alborán (Julio Reyes Copello, producer; Carlos Fernández López, Ricardo López Lalinde, Natalia Ramírez & Julio Reyes Copello, recording engineers; Trevor Muzzy, mixer; Antonio Baglio, mastering); "É Fake (Homem Barato)" – Anaadi (Leo Bracht, producer; Leo Bracht, recording engineer; Leo Bracht, mixer; Felipe Tichauer, mastering); "Mi Gente" – J Balvin featuring Willy William (Willy William, producer; Willy William, recording engineer; Phil Greiss, mixer; Dave Kutch, mastering); "Internacionales" – Bomba Estéreo (Edgar Barrera, Christian Castagno, Simón Mejía & Liliana Saumet, producers; Ethan Shumaker, recording engineers; Ricky Reed, mixer; Chris Athens, mastering); "Malamente" – Rosalía (El Guincho & Rosalía, producers; El Guincho, recording engineer; Jaycen Joshua, mixer; Chris Athens, mastering); "Para Siempre" – Kany García (Marcos Sánchez & Afo Verde, producers; José E. Díaz, Orlando Ferrer & Marcos Sánchez, recording engineers; Marcos Sánchez, mixer; Eduardo Ramos, mastering); "X" – Nicky Jam featuring J Balvin (Giordano Ashruf, Rashid Badloe & Jonathan Bryan Thiel, producers; Cristhian Mena & Alejandro Patiño, recording engineers; Alejandro Patiño, mixer; Alejandro Patiño, mastering); "Danza de Gardenias" – Natalia Lafourcade featuring Los Macorinos (Kiko Campos, producer; Rubén López Arista, recording engineer; Rubén López Arista, mixer; Gavin Lurssen, mastering); "Bailar Contigo" – Monsieur Periné (Eduardo Cabra, Catalina García Barahona & Santiago Prieto Sarabia, producers; Eduardo Cabra & Uriel Dorfman, recording engineers; Fab Dupont, mixer; Diego Calviño & Pablo López Ruiz, mastering)
2019	Alejandro Sanz and Camila Cabello · Alfonso Pérez, Julio Reyes Copello & Alejandro Sanz, record producers · Nicolás De La Espriella, Carlos Fernando López, Alfonso Pérez, Natalia Ramírez, Nicolás Ramírez & Julio Reyes Copello, recording engineers · Trevor Lyle Muzzy, mixer · Gene Grimaldi, mastering engineer	"Mi Persona Favorita"	"Parecen Viernes" – Marc Anthony (Marc Anthony & Sergio George, record producers; Carlos Alvarez, Juan Mario Aracil "Mayito", Natalia Ramírez & Julio Reyes Copello, recording engineers; Carlos Álvarez & Juan Mario Aracil "Mayito", mixers; Adam Ayan & Michael Fuller, mastering engineers); "Verdades Afiladas" – Andrés Calamaro (Gustavo Borner, record producer; Gustavo Borner, recording engineer; Gustavo Borner, mixer; Eric Boulanger, mastering engineer); "Ahí Ahí" – Vicente García (Eduardo Cabra & Vicente García, record producers; José Victor Olivier, Daniel Sanint & Harold Wendell Sanders, recording engineers; Fab Dupont, mixer; Diego Calviño, mastering engineer); "Kitipun" – Juan Luis Guerra y 4.40 (Juan Luis Guerra & Janina Rosado, record producers; Allan Leschhorn & Simon Rhodes, recording engineers; Allan Leschhorn, mixer; Adam Ayan, mastering engineer); "Querer Mejor" – Juanes and Alessia Cara (Rafa Arcaute, Juanes & Tainy, producers; Alejandro Patiño & Orlando Vitto, recording engineers; Jaycen Joshua, mixer; Dave Kutch, mastering engineer); "La Plata" – Juanes and Lalo Ebratt (Mauricio Rengifo & Andrés Torres, record producers; Nicolás Ladrón de Guevara, Mauricio Rengifo & Andrés Torres, recording engineers; Jaycen Joshua, mixer; Dave Kutch, mastering engineer); "Aute Cuture" – Rosalía (El Guincho & Rosalía, record producers; El Guincho, recording engineer; Jaycen Joshua, mixer; Chris Athens, mastering engineer); "No Tengo Nada" – Alejandro Sanz (Alfonso Pérez, Julio Reyes Copello & Alejandro Sanz, record producers; Nicolás De La Espriella, Carlos Fernando López, Alfonso Pérez, Natalia Ramírez, Nicolás Ramírez & Julio Reyes Copello, recording engineers; Trevor Lyle Muzzy, mixer; Gene Grimaldi, mastering engineer); "Cobarde" – Ximena Sariñana (Mauricio Rengifo & Andrés Torres, record producers; Mauricio Rengifo & Andrés Torres, recording engineers; Jaycen Joshua, mixer; Dave Kutch, mastering engineer)
2020	Alejandro Sanz · Julio Reyes Copello & Rafa Sardina, producers · James Fitzpatick, Jan Holzner, Nicolás Ramírez, Julio Reyes Copello & Rafa Sardina, recording engineers · Nicolás Ramírez, mixer · Carlos Hernández Carbonell, mastering engineer	"Contigo"	"China" – Anuel AA, Daddy Yankee, Karol G, Ozuna and J Balvin (Marco Masis "Tainy", producer; Luis "Wichie" Ortiz, recording engineer; Luis "Wichie" Ortiz & Juan G. Rivera, mixers; Luis "Wichie" Ortiz & Juan G. Rivera, mastering engineers); "Cuando estes aquí" – Pablo Alborán (Pablo Alborán, record producer; Pablo Alborán, recording engineer; Oscar Clavel, mixer; Oscar Clavel, mastering engineer); "Vete" – Bad Bunny (Cesar Oscar Batista Escalera, Jose Carlos Cruz, Freddy Momtalvo, Ivaniel Ortiz, Edgar Wilmer Semper-Vargas & Xavier Alexis Semper-Vargas, record producers; La Paciencia, recording engineer; Josh Gudwin, mixer; Colin Leonard, mastering engineer); "Solari Yacumenza" – Bajofondo featuring Cuareim 1080 (Juan Campodónico & Gustavo Santaolalla, record producers; Julio Berta, recording engineer; Juan Campodónico, Aníbal Kerpel & Gustavo Santaolalla, mixers; Tom Baker, mastering engineer); "Rojo" – J Balvin (Alejandro "Sky" Ramírez & Taiko, record producers; Joel Iglesias, recording engineer; Josh Gudwin, mixer; Colin Leonard, mastering engineer); "Tutu" – Camilo featuring Pedro Capó (Jon Leone, Richi López & George Noriega, record producers; Camilo, Jon Leone, Richi López & George Noriega, recording engineers; Juan G. Rivera, mixer; Mike Bozzi, mastering engineer); "Lo que en ti veo" – Kany García and Nahuel Pennisi (Julio Reyes Copello, record producer; Sebastián Ezequiel Sanabria, Carlos Fernando López, Nicolás Ramírez, Julio Reyes Copello, Marcos Sánchez & Daniel Uribe, recording engineers; Marcos Sánchez, mixer; Gene Grimaldi, mastering engineer); "Tusa" – Karol G and Nicki Minaj (Daniel Oviedo Echevarria, record producer; Daniel Oviedo Echevarria, recording engineer; Rob Kinelski, mixer; Dave Kutch, mastering engineer); "René" – Residente (Residente, record producer; Phil Joly & Carlos Velázquez, recording engineers; Beatriz Artola, mixer; Ted Jensen, mastering engineer)
2021	Caetano Veloso & Tom Veloso · Mário Adnet & Cézar Mendes, record producers · Lucas Ariel & Lucas Nunes, recording engineers · Daniel Carvalho, mixer · Daniel Carvalho, mastering engineer	"Talvez"	"Si Hubieras Querido" – Pablo Alborán (Julio Reyes Copello, record producer; Pablo Pulido, Julio Reyes Copello & Natalia Schlesinger, recording engineers; Nicolás Ramírez, mixer; Gene Grimaldi, mastering engineer); "Todo de Ti" – Rauw Alejandro (Rauw Alejandro & Luis J. González, record producers; José M. Collazo, recording engineer; José M. Collazo, mixer; Sensei Sound, mastering engineer); "Un Amor Eterno (Versión Balada)" – Marc Anthony (Motiff & Julio Reyes Copello, record producers; Nicolás “Na’vi” De La Espriella, Julio Reyes Copello & Daniel Uribe, recording engineers; Nicolás Ramírez & Julio Reyes Copello, mixers; Gene Grimaldi, mastering engineer); "A Tu Lado" – Paula Arenas (Maria Elisa Ayerbe & Sebastián Mejía, record producers; Maria Elisa Ayerbe & Sebastián Mejía, recording engineers; Maria Elisa Ayerbe, mixer; Camilo Silva, mastering engineer); "Bohemio" – Andrés Calamaro & Julio Iglesias (Carlos Narea, record producer; Ángel Martos & Carlos Narea, mixers; Ángel Martos, mastering engineer); "Vida de Rico" – Camilo (Édgar Barrera & Camilo, record producers; Édgar Barrera, Richard Bravo & Nicolás Ramírez, recording engineers; Luis Barrera Jr., mixer; Mike Bozzi, mastering engineer); "Suéltame, Bogotá" – Diamante Eléctrico (Juan Galeano & Andrés Rebellón, record producers; Diamante Eléctrico & Andrés Rebellón, recording engineers; Andrés Rebellón, mixer; Gavin Lurssen, mastering engineer); "Amén" – Ricardo Montaner, Mau y Ricky, Camilo, Evaluna Montaner (Richi López & Ricardo Montaner, record producers; Richi López, Aaron Sterling & Guillermo Vadalá, recording engineers; Manny Marroquin, mixer; Emerson Mancini, mastering engineer); "Dios Así lo Quiso" – Ricardo Montaner & Juan Luis Guerra (David "Xaxo" Julca, Jonathan "Xaxo" Julca, Yasmil Marrufo & Ricardo Montaner, record producers; Luis Alejandro Bermúdez, Allan Leschhorn, Yasmil Marrufo, Dario Moscatelli, Raniero Palm & Ruben Salas, recording engineers; Javier Garza, mixer; Mike Fuller, mastering engineer); "Te Olvidaste" – C. Tangana & Omar Apollo (Alizzz, Rafa Arcaute, C. Tangana & Federico Vindver, record producers; Rafa Arcaute, Nathan Phillips & Federico Vindver, recording engineers; Delbert Bowers, mixer; Chris Athens, mastering engineer)
2022	Jorge Drexler & C. Tangana · Carles Campi Campón, Jorge Drexler, Víctor Martínez, Pablopablo & C. Tangana, record producers · Carles Campi Campón, recording engineer · Carles Campi Campón, mixer; Fred Kevorkian, mastering engineer	"Tocarte"	"Pa Mis Muchachas" – Christina Aguilera, Becky G, Nicki Nicole featuring Nathy Peluso (Rafael Arcaute, Jean Rodriguez, Afo Verde & Federico Vindver, record producers; Rafael Arcaute, Ray Charles Brown, Jr., Jean Rodríguez & Federico Vindver, recording engineers; Jaycen Joshua, mixer and mastering engineer); "Castillos de Arena" – Pablo Alborán (Paco Salazar, record producer; Felipe Guevara, mixer; Dave Kutch, mastering engineer); "Envolver" – Anitta (Freddy Montalvo, record producer; Freddy Montalvo, mixer; Colin Leonard, mastering engineer); "Pa'lla Voy" – Marc Anthony (Marc Anthony, Julio Reyes Copello & Sergio George, record producers; Juan Mario Aracil, recording engineer; Juan Mario Aracil, mixer; Adam Ayan, mastering engineer); "Ojitos Lindos" – Bad Bunny & Bomba Estereo (Tainy, record producer; Josh Gudwin, mixer; Colin Leonard, mastering engineer); "Pegao" – Camilo (Édgar Barrera, Camilo & Nicolás Ramírez, record producers; Luis Barrera Jr., mixer; Mike Bozzi, mastering engineer); "Provenza" – Karol G (Ovy on the Drums, record producer; Ovy on the Drums, recording engineer; Rob Kinelski, mixer; David Kutch, mastering engineer); "Vale la Pena" – Juan Luis Guerra (Juan Luis Guerra & Janina Rosado, record producers; Amable Frometa & Allan Leschhorn, recording engineers; Allan Leschhorn, mixer; Adam Ayann, mastering engineer); "LA FAMA" – Rosalía featuring The Weeknd (Frank Dukes, El Guincho, Noah Goldstein, Dylan Patrice, Sky Rompiendo, Rosalía, Tainy & The Weeknd, record producers; Shin Kamiyama, Tyler Murphy & David Rodríguez, recording engineers; Manny Marroquin, mixer; Chris Gehringer, mastering engineer); "Te Felicito" – Shakira & Rauw Alejandro (Kevyn Mauricio Cruz Moreno, Alberto Carlos Melendez, Lenin Yorney Palacios, Shakira & Andrés Uribe Marín, record producers; Dave Clauss, Jorge E. Pizarro Ruiz, Cameron Gower Poole, Roger Rodés & Dani Val, recording engineers; Dave Clauss, mixer; Adam Ayan, mastering engineer); "Baloncito Viejo" – Carlos Vives & Camilo (Daniel Cortés, Andrés Leal, Martín Velilla & Carlos Vives, record producers; Andrés Borda, Daniel Cortés, Andrés Leal, Juan Sebastián Parra, Nicolás Ramírez & Martín Velilla, recording engineers; Manny Marroquin, mixer; Dave Kutch, mastering engineer)
2023	Natalia Lafourcade · Adan Jodorowsky & Natalia Lafourcade, record producers · Gerardo Ordoñez, recording engineer · Gerardo Ordoñez, mixer · Bernie Grundman, mastering engineer	"De Todas las Flores"	"No Es Que Te Extrañe" – Christina Aguilera (Rafa Arcaute, Afo Verde & Federico Vindver, record producers; Rafa Arcaute, Ray Charles Brown Jr., Jean Rodríguez, Felipe Trujillo & Federico Vindver, recording engineers; Jaycen Joshua & Mike Seaberg, mixers; Jaycen Joshua, mastering engineer); "Carretera y Manta" – Pablo Alborán (Pablo Alborán, record producer; Pablo Pulido & Luis Villa, recording engineers; Lewis Pickett, mixer; Dave Kutch, mastering engineer); "Déjame Llorarte" – Paula Arenas featuring Jesús Navarro (María Elisa Ayerbe & Marcos Sánchez, record producers; María Elisa Ayerbe & Andrés Chano Guardado, recording engineers; María Elisa Ayerbe, mixer; Orlando Ferrer, mastering engineer); "Shakira: Bzrp Music Sessions, Vol. 53" – Bizarrap featuring Shakira (Bizarrap, record producer; Bizarrap, recording engineer; Bizarrap, Dave Clauss, Shakira & Zecca, mixers; Dave Clauss & Zecca, mastering engineers); "Si Tú Me Quieres" – Fonseca & Juan Luis Guerra (Fonseca, Yadam González & Juanes, record producers; Sebastian De Peyrecave, Fonseca & Allan Leschhörn, recording engineers; Juan Mario Aracil & Trevor Muzzy, mixers; Esteban Piñeiro, mastering engineer); "Mientras Me Curo del Cora" – Karol G (Linda Goldstein, Juan Andrés Ospina & Ovy on the Drums, record producers; Juan Andrés Ospina & Ovy On The Drums, recording engineers; Rob Kinelski, mixer; Dave Kutch, mastering engineer); "Ojos Marrones" – Lasso (Renzo Bravo & Orlando Vitto, record producers; Renzo Bravo & Orlando Vitto, recording engineers; Orlando Vitto, mixer; Dave Kutch, mastering engineer); "La Fórmula" – Maluma & Marc Anthony (Marc Anthony, Edgar Barrera, Sergio George, Kevin Mauricio Jiménez Londoño, Bryan Snaider Lezcano Chaverra & Maluma, record producers; Juan Mario Aracil & Arbise "Motiff" González, recording engineers; Juan Mario Aracil, Luis Barrera Jr. & Arbise "Motiff" González, mixers; Adam Ayan, mastering engineer); "Despechá" – Rosalía (Gaby Music, Noah Goldstein, Chris Jedi, Dylan Patrice & Rosalía, record producers; Jake Miller, Roger Rodés & David Rodríguez, recording engineers; Manny Marroquin, mixer; Chris Gehringer, mastering engineer); "Correcaminos" – Alejandro Sanz featuring Danny Ocean (Alizzz, record producer; Alizzz, Frank Lozano & Alfonso Pérez, recording engineers; Lewis Pickett, mixer; Miguel Ángel González, mastering engineer)
2024	Juan Luis Guerra 4.40 · Juan Luis Guerra & Janina Rosado, record producers · Allan Leschhorn, recording engineer · Allan Leschhorn, mixer · Adam Ayan, mastering engineer	"Mambo 23"	"Mil Veces" – Anitta (Marcio Arantes, DJ Gabriel Do Borel & Julia Lewis, record producers; Denzel "Heartbreak" Richards, Jean Rodriguez & Pamela Velez, recording engineers; Eli Heisler & Rob Kinelski, mixers; Dave Kutch, mastering engineer); "Monaco" – Bad Bunny (Argel, Smash David, Edsclusive, La Paciencia & Mag, record producers; Colin Leonard, recording engineer; Josh Gudwin, mixer; Bad Bunny, mastering engineer); "Una Vida Pasada" – Camilo & Carín León (Camilo, record producer; Richard Bravo, Oscar Convers, Frank Fuentes, Nico González, Nicolás Ramírez & Daniel Uribe, recording engineers; Nico González & Nicolás Ramírez, mixers; Adam Ayan, mastering engineer); "Catalina" – Cimafunk & Monsieur Periné (Fux Beat, record producer; Jose Manuel Morales Duluc, recording engineer; Jonathan Vergara, mixer; Bassy Bob Brockmann, mastering engineer); "Derrumbe" – Jorge Drexler (Rafa Arcaute, Jorge Drexler & Federico Vindver, record producers; Rafa Arcaute, Lucas Piedracueva & Federico Vindver, recording engineers; Carlos Hernández Carbonell, mastering engineer); "Con Dinero y Sin Dinero" – Fonseca & Grupo Niche (José Aguirre & Fonseca, record producers; José Aguirre, Carlos Bonilla & Germán Rodríguez, recording engineers; Carlos Alvarez, mixer; Mike Fuller, mastering engineer); "Mi Ex Tenía Razón" – Karol G (Édgar Barrera & Mag, record producers; Na, recording engineer; MAG, mixer; Colin Leonard, mastering engineer); "Tenochtitlán" – Mon Laferte (Manú Jalil & Mon Laferte, record producers; Isaí Araujo, Manú Jalil, Daniel Martinez & Pablo Rojas, recording engineers; Ignacio Sotelo, mixer; Chalo González, mastering engineer); "Igual Que un Ángel" – Kali Uchis & Peso Pluma (Carter Lang, Jean Rodriguez, Kali Uchis & Dylan Wiggins, record producers; Luca Brown, Austen Jux-Chandler, Enrique Larreal & Jean Rodriguez, recording engineers; Neal Pogue, mixer; Mike Bozzi, mastering engineer)
2025	Alejandro Sanz · Luis Miguel Gómez Castaño & Manuel Lorente Freire, record producers · Frank Lozano, Alfonso Pérez & Felipe Trujillo, recording engineers · Lewis Pickett, mixer · David Kutch, mastering engineer	"Palmeras en el Jardín"	"Baile Inolvidable" – Bad Bunny (Jay Anthony Nuñez, Elikai, Julito Gaston, Roberto José Rosado Torres & Mag, record producers; Antonio Caraballo, Luis Amed Irizarry, Armando López & Roberto José Rosado Torres, recording engineers; Josh Gudwin, mixer; Colin Leonard, mastering engineer); "DTMF" – Bad Bunny (Scotty Dittrich, Hydra Hitz, Roberto José Rosado Torres, Julia Lewis, Mag & Tyler Spry, record producers; Antonio Caraballo, Roberto José Rosado Torres & Tyler Spry, recording engineers; Josh Gudwin, mixer; Colin Leonard, mastering engineer); "El Día del Amigo" – Ca7riel & Paco Amoroso (Rafa Arcaute & Federico Vindver, record producers; Rafa Arcaute, Luis Tomás La Madrid & Federico Vindver, recording engineers; Rafa Arcaute, Felipe Bernal, Lewis Pickett & Federico Vindver, mixers; Lewis Pickett, mastering engineer); "#Tetas" – Ca7riel & Paco Amoroso (Rafa Arcaute & Federico Vindver, record producers; Rafa Arcaute, Luis Tomás La Madrid & Federico Vindver, recording engineers; Rafa Arcaute, Felipe Bernal, Lewis Pickett & Federico Vindver, mixers; Lewis Pickett, mastering engineer); "Desastres Fabulosos" – Jorge Drexler & Conociendo Rusia (Nico Cotton, record producer; Nico Cotton & Julio Gómez Núñez, recording engineers; Nico Cotton, mixer; Fred Kevorkian, mastering engineer); "Lara" – Zoe Gotusso (Cachorro López & Diego Mema, record producers; Demián Nava, recording engineer; César Sogbe, mixer; Javier Fracchia, mastering engineer); "Si Antes Te Hubiera Conocido" – Karol G (Edgar Barrera, Karol G & Sky Rompiendo, record producers; Joel Iglesias, recording engineer; Luis Barrera Jr., mixer; Luis Barrera Jr., mastering engineer); "Cancionera" – Natalia Lafourcade (Adán Jodorowsky & Natalia Lafourcade, record producers; Jack Lahana, recording engineer; Jack Lahana, mixer; Bernie Grundman, mastering engineer); "Ao Teu Lado" – Liniker (Júlio Fejuca, Liniker & Gustavo Ruiz Chagas, record producers; Ricardo Camêra, Júlio Fejuca, Daniel Mariano Gonçalves, André Malaquias, João Milliet, Gabriel Pinheiro Machado Milliet, Gustavo Ruiz Chagas, Adonias Souza Júnior & Eric Yoshino, recording engineers; João Milliet, mixer; Felipe Tichauer, mastering engineer)
2026	Milo J: Santiago Alvarado, Milo J & Santiago Ruiz "Tatool", record producers; Luciano Nicolas Gordillo, recording engineer; Jon Castelli, mixer; Dale Becker, mastering engineer	"Niño"	"Ha Ha" – Ca7riel & Paco Amoroso (Rafa Arcaute & Federico Vindver, record producers; Julio Gómez, recording engineer; Lewis Pickett, mixer; Lewis Pickett, mastering engineer); "¿Como Se Ama?" – Jorge Drexler (Facundo Balta, Jorge Drexler, Mauro, Lucas Piedra Cueva & Tadu Vázquez, record producers; Lucas Piedra Cueva, recording engineer; Carles Campi Campón, mixer; Fred Kevorkian, mastering engineer); "Dime" – Silvana Estrada (Daniel Bitrán Arizpe, Edwin Erazo & Silvana Estrada, record producers; Pietro Amato, Daniel Bitrán Arizpe, Leonel Carmona, Nic Hard, Warren Spicer & J.C. Vertti, recording engineers; Daniel Bitrán Arizpe, mixer; Ryan K. Smith, mastering engineer); "O Amor Nos Encontrou" – Loulu Gilberto (Mario Adnet & Cézar Mendes, record producers; Lucas Ariel & Gabriel Pinheiro, recording engineers; Gabriel Pinheiro, mixer; David Darlington, mastering engineer); "Coleccionando Heridas" – Karol G & Marco Antonio Solís (Edgar Barrera & Luis Miguel Gómez Castaño, record producers; Edgar Barrera, Joel Iglesias & José "Pepe" Melena, recording engineers; Josh Gudwin & Joel Iglesias, mixers; Dave Kutch, mastering engineer); "Femme Fatale" – Mon Laferte (Manú Jalil & Mon Laferte, record producers; Isaí Araujo, Daniel Bitrán, Lu Garibay, Manú Jalil, Israel Rodriguez-Martinez, Nacho Sotelo & Jorge Valdés, recording engineers; Nacho Sotelo, mixer; Nacho Sotelo, mastering engineer); "Desde Que Te Tengo" – Carín León (Israel Aispuro Meneses & Orlando Aispuro Meneses, record producers; Orlando Aispuro Meneses, Alberto Medina, Abraham Eduardo Tapia García & Antonio Zepeda, recording engineers; Alberto Medina, mixer; Alberto Medina, mastering engineer); "La Perla" – Rosalía featuring Yahritza y Su Esencia (Noah Goldstein, David Rodríguez, Rosalía & Dylan Wiggins, record producers; Daniel Cayotte, Isaac Diskin, Tristan Hoogland, Jake Miller, David Rodríguez & Harry Wilson, recording engineers; Manny Marroquin, mixer; Bob Jackson & Brian Lee, mastering engineers); "Alma" – Elena Rose (Daramola & Héctor Mazzarri, record producers; Daramola & Héctor Mazzarri, recording engineers; Leandro "Dro" Hidalgo, mixer; Leandro "Dro" Hidalgo, mastering engineer)

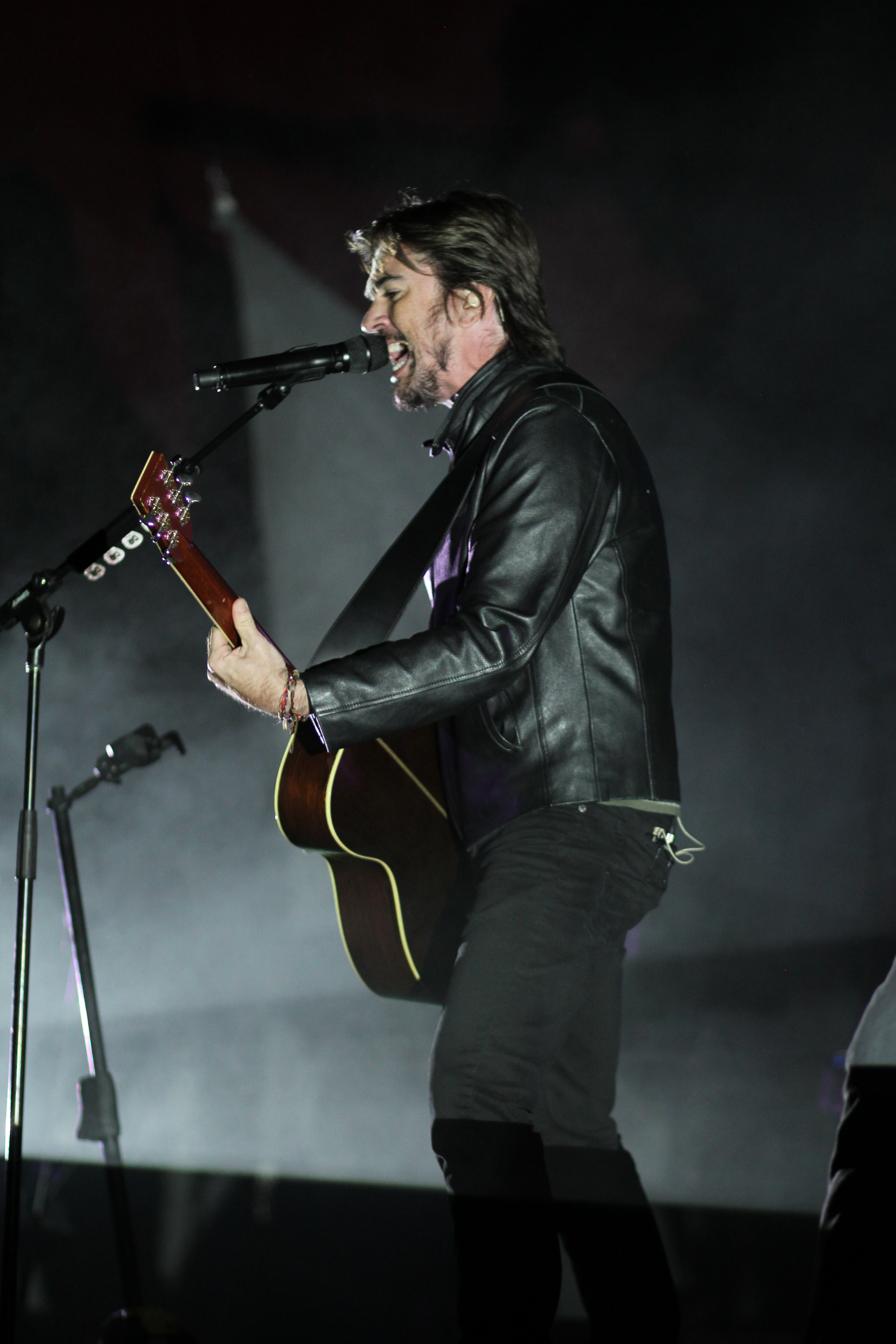
Colombian singer-songwriter Juanes received the award in 2003 and 2008.

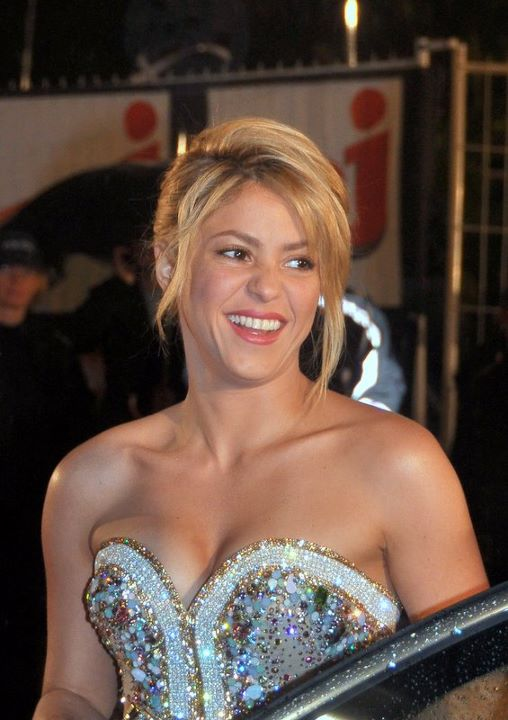
2006 and 2016 winner Shakira.

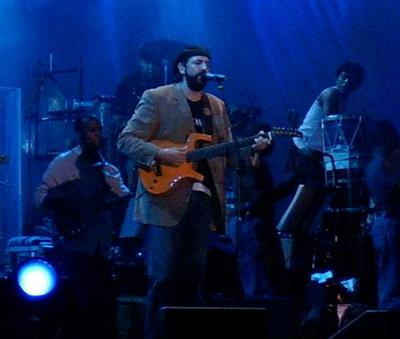
Dominican singer-songwriter Juan Luis Guerra received the award in 2007 for "La Llave de Mi Corazón".

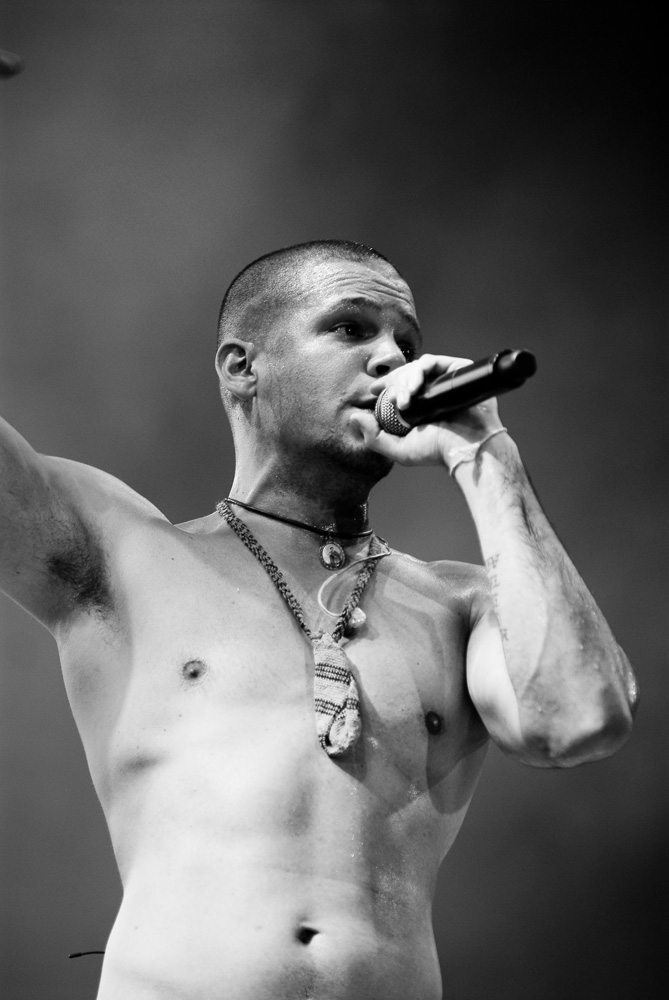
Puerto Rican singer René Pérez of the band Calle 13 was awarded in 2009 for the song "No Hay Nadie Como Tú" and in 2011 for Latinoamérica.

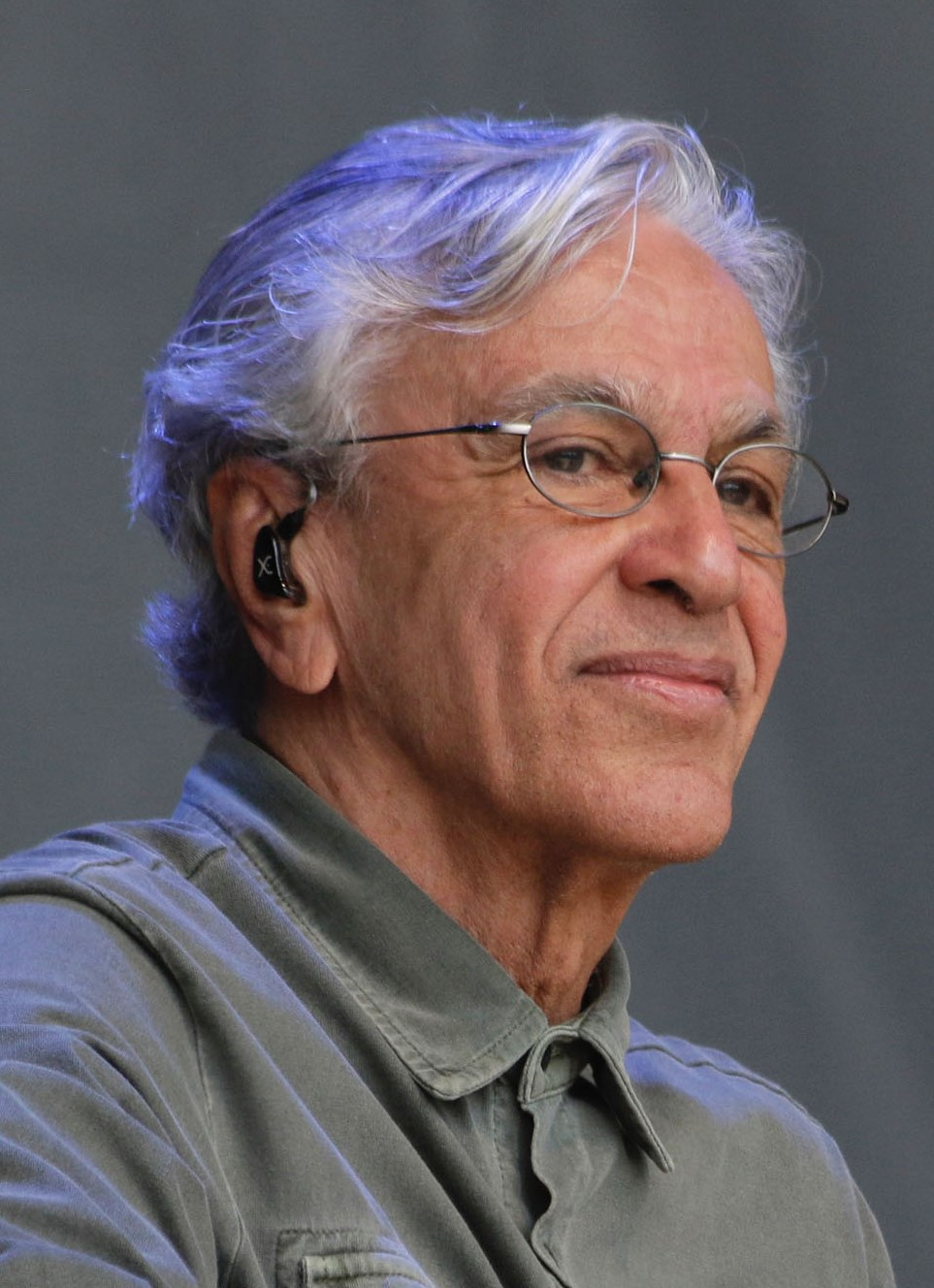
Brazilian singer Caetano Veloso won in 2021 for "Talvez".

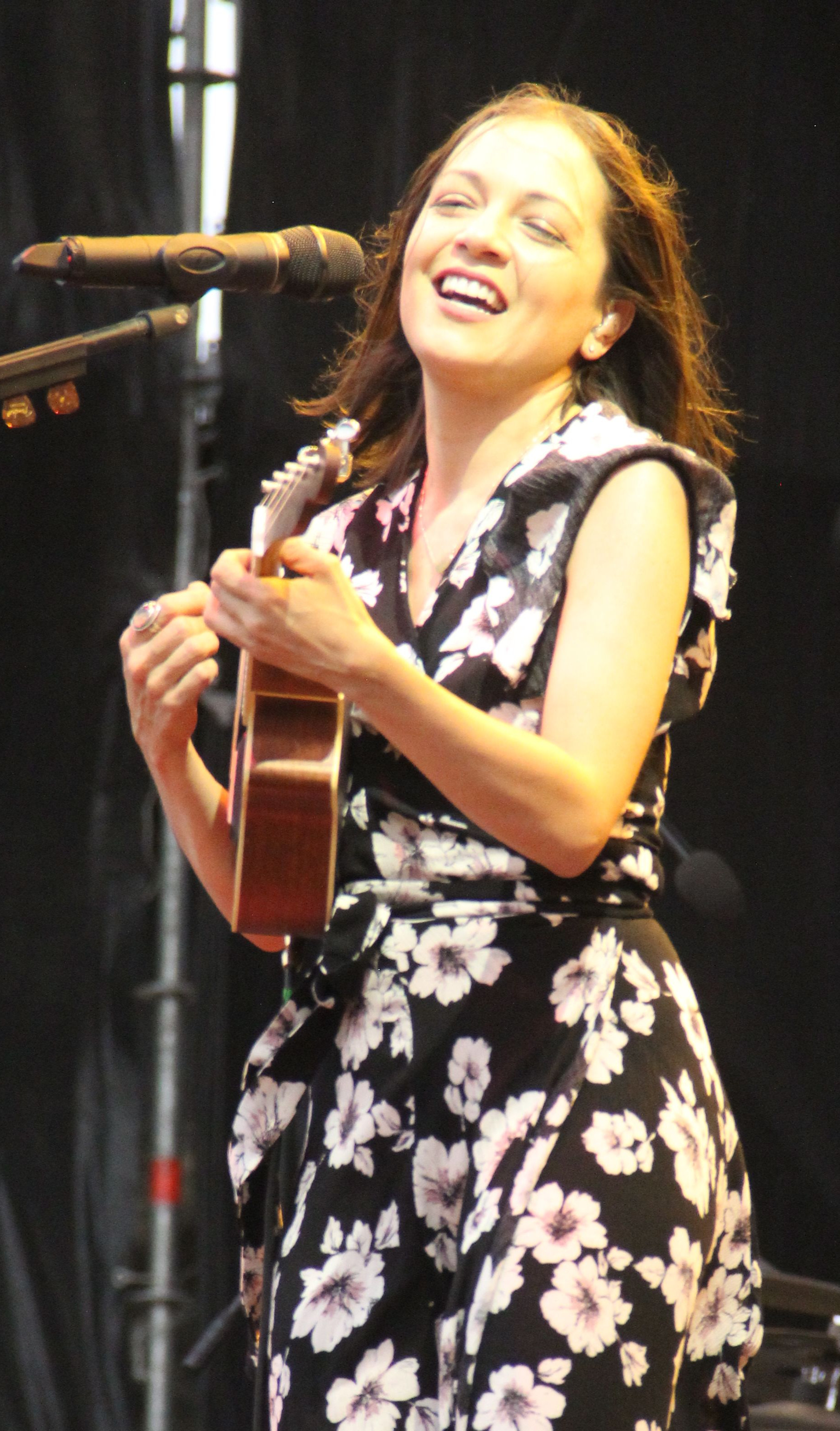
2015 and 2023 winner, Natalia Lafourcade

== Notes ==
^{^[I]} Each year is linked to the article about the Latin Grammy Awards held that year.
^{^[II]} Showing the name of the performer, the nominated song and in parentheses the record producer, and engineers/mixers name(s).

== See also ==
- Grammy Award for Record of the Year
