= Se Vende =

Single by Alejandro Sanz

from the album La Música No Se Toca
- Released: 17 September 2012
- Recorded: 2012
- Genre: Latin pop
- Length: 3:52
- Label: Universal Music Group
- Songwriters: Alejandro Sanz, Julio Reyes
- Producers: Alejandro Sanz, Julio Reyes

Alejandro Sanz singles chronology
"No Me Compares" (2012)	"Se Vende" (2012)	"Mi Marciana" (2012)

Music video
- "Se Vende" on YouTube

"Se Vende" (English: For Sale) is a song recorded by the Spanish singer-songwriter Alejandro Sanz. The song serves as second single for Sanz's ninth studio album La Música No Se Toca (2012). It was released for digital download on 17 September 2012. Five days before the date of release, he released a teaser of the music video, showing only 57 seconds of it.

== Song information ==
"Se Vende" (2012)
19 second preview of the song.

Se Vende is the second single of Sanz's ninth studio album, La Música No Se Toca . This song is written by Alejandro Sanz himself along with Colombian Grammy award winner Julio Reyes.
Lyrics of the song shows that how much love and hate are close to each other. In many parts of the song, Alejandro clearly talked about how his love sold her soul.

== Music video ==
Three couples dancing in the video alongside Alejandro Sanz.

The video was filmed in Madrid, Spain under the direction of renowned Spanish director David Alcalde, who has developed an original idea of showing three couples dancing mixed by stories of love and hate.
Just like the song, Music video released on September 17 at a total length of exact four minutes and is available on iTunes, radio, television and in his official YouTube channel.
in the video, we saw three couples dancing and Alejandro walking around and singing. while couples are dancing with attitude of showing love and hate at the same time, Sanz keep singing and walking under rain and then snow.
At the finish, all couples gave each other hugs and Alejandro looked at the light and walked away.

== Charts ==
=== Weekly charts ===
Chart (2012–2013)	Peak position
Colombia (National-Report)	9
Mexico (Billboard Mexican Airplay)	13
Mexico (Monitor Latino)	4
Spain (Promusicae)	3
US Hot Latin Songs (Billboard)	23
US Latin Airplay (Billboard)	20
US Latin Pop Airplay (Billboard)	7
US Tropical Airplay (Billboard)	11

=== Year-end charts ===
Chart (2013)	Position
US Hot Latin Songs (Billboard)	93

== Song Credits ==
- Producers: Julio Reyes Copello, Alejandro Sanz
- Recording Engineers: Edgar Barrera, Alejandro Sanz, Julio Reyes Copello, Lee Levin
- Mixed by: Sebastian Krys
- Arrangements and Programming: Julio Reyes Copello
- Acoustic Guitar: Andres Castro
- Electric Guitar: Andres Castro, Carlos Rufo
- Bass: Guillermo Vadala
- Drums: Lee Levin
- Back vocals: Robert Elias, Jackie Mendez
- Keyboard: Julio Reyes Copello
- Piano: Julio Reyes Copello
