= No Me Compares (song) =

Single by Alejandro Sanz

from the album La Música No Se Toca
- Released: June 25, 2012
- Recorded: 2012
- Genre: Latin pop
- Length: 4:42; 5:07 (feat. Ivete Sangalo)
- Label: Universal Music Group
- Songwriter: Alejandro Sanz
- Producers: Alejandro Sanz, Julio Reyes Copello

Alejandro Sanz singles chronology
"Lola Soledad" (2010)	"No Me Compares" (2012)	"Se Vende" (2012)

Music video
- "No Me Compares" on YouTube

"No Me Compares" (English: Don't Compare Me) is a song recorded by the Spanish singer-songwriter Alejandro Sanz. It was released as the first single from his ninth studio album La Música No Se Toca (2012) and based on the opening theme song in the telenovela Amores verdaderos. The song was released for digital download on June 25, 2012 . In the day of release, he put a Lyric video on his VEVO channel on YouTube and at the end of the video, he announced the name of his new album, La Música No Se Toca. The single was nominated for Song of the Year and Record of the Year at the 13th Annual Latin Grammy Awards.

== Song information ==
"No Me Compares" (2012)
First chorus of the music .

The song is a romantic song about Sanz telling his love how he feels about her. At the start of the chorus he sings " Vengo del aire, Que te secaba a ti la piel, mi amor ". It means " I come from the air that dried your skin, my love." Also at the end of the second chorus he finished the main part of the song by singing " Yo soy tu alma, Tú eres mi aire." It means " I'm your soul, You're my air."

== Music video ==
Alejandro Sanz released the music video on his VEVO Channel on June 29, 2012, four days after releasing the audio. The music video was filmed in Miami. It's about Sanz's memories from his past, which are washing up along the shore. The video starts small with little objects then it gets bigger and bigger. During this time he is getting flashbacks of his childhood which is interpreted by Fabio Leal and a lost love. At the ending she comes back and they walk away with each other. The director of the video was Ethan Lader who has also directed videos for Bruno Mars, Mariah Carey, and Jason Derulo.

== Live performances ==
On Alejandro's official website, he announced that he will be a part of "Cap Roig Festival 2012" and will perform a concert. Then on his page on the festival's website, they announced that Alejandro will perform "No Me Compares" live for the first time on August 18 in the festival. After that he performed this music on so many stages including his recently worldwide tour and at the 13th Annual Latin Grammy Awards.

== Duet version ==
A Brazilian-Portuguese version, named "Não Me Compares", was released as single only in Brazil on December 1, 2012, featured Brazilian recording artist Ivete Sangalo. The music video was released on December 18. The song was included in Brazilian version of La Música No Se Toca and in the soundtrack of soap opera Salve Jorge.

== Track listing ==
- Download digital
1. "No Me Compares" – 4:38
- Brazilian version
- "Não Me Compares" (featuring Ivete Sangalo) – 5:07

== Chart performance ==
=== Weekly charts ===
Chart (2012)	Peak position
Colombia (National-Report)	7
Honduras (Honduras Top 50)	34
Mexico (Billboard Mexican Airplay)	4
Mexico (Monitor Latino)	1
Spain (Promusicae)	1
US Hot Latin Songs (Billboard)	1
US Latin Pop Airplay (Billboard)	1
US Tropical Airplay (Billboard)	1
Remix version featuring Ivete Sangalo
Brazil Hot 100 Airplay (Billboard Brasil)	45
Brazil (Hot Pop Songs)	11

Year-End Chart (2012)	Peak position
Spain (PROMUSICAE)	20

Chart (2013)	Position
Brazil (Crowley)	95

== Certifications ==
Region	Certification	Certified units/sales
Brazil (Pro-Música Brasil)	2× Diamond	500,000^{‡}
Spain (Promusicae)	Gold	20,000^{*}
^{*} Sales figures based on certification alone.^{‡} Sales+streaming figures based on certification alone.

== Song Credits ==
- Productores: Julio Reyes Copello, Alejandro Sanz
- Ingenieros de Grabacion: Edgar Barrera, Alejandro Sanz, Julio Reyes Copello
- Mezclada por: Sebastian Krys
- Arreglos y Programacion: Julio Reyes Copello
- Guitarras Acusticas: Andres Castro
- Coros: Robert Elias, Jackie Mendez
- Teclados: Julio Reyes Copello
- Piano: Julio Reyes Copello

== See also ==
- List of number-one songs of 2012 (Mexico)
- List of Billboard number-one Latin songs of 2012
