= Mi Marciana =

Single by Alejandro Sanz

from the album La Música No Se Toca
- Released: 6 December 2012
- Recorded: 2012
- Genre: Latin pop, Flamenco
- Length: 4:53
- Label: Universal Music Group
- Songwriter: Alejandro Sanz
- Producers: Alejandro Sanz, Julio Reyes Copello

Alejandro Sanz singles chronology
"Se Vende" (2012)	"Mi Marciana" (2012)	"Camino de Rosas" (2012)

"Mi Marciana" (English: My Martian) is a song recorded by the Spanish singer-songwriter Alejandro Sanz. It was released as the third single from his ninth studio album La Música No Se Toca (2012). The song was released for digital download on 6 December 2012.

== Song information ==
Mi Marciana is the third single of Sanz's ninth studio album La Música No Se Toca and was written by Alejandro Sanz and co-produced by Sanz and Colombian producer, musician, and songwriter, Julio Reyes Copello.
Sanz received a Record of the Year and Song of the Year nominations at the 14th Latin Grammy Awards for the song. The song was also nominated for a 2014 Lo Nuestro Award for Video of the Year and Pop Song of the Year.

== Live Performances ==
Sanz performed this song on several stages including his recent worldwide tour. One of the best performances occurred on 12 December 2012, on the program La Voz España, when he performed with the four finalists of the show.

== Track listing ==
Digital download
No.	Title	Length
1.	"Mi Marciana"	4:53

== Charts ==
=== Weekly charts ===
Chart (2013)	Peak position
Colombia (National-Report)	13
Mexico (Billboard Mexican Airplay)	9
Mexico (Monitor Latino)	3
Spain (Promusicae)	10
US Hot Latin Songs (Billboard)	32
US Latin Airplay (Billboard)	29
US Latin Pop Airplay (Billboard)	8
US Tropical Airplay (Billboard)	33

=== Year-end charts ===
Chart (2013)	Position
US Hot Latin Songs (Billboard)	99
