= Brika =

American singer-songwriter

- Born: Briana Martinez
- Origin: United States
- Genres: Alternative; R&B; electronic; brown-eyed soul; chill-out
- Occupations: Singer, Songwriter, Musician
- Instruments: Vocals, Keyboard, Piano
- Years active: 2013–present
- Website: brikamusic.com

Briana Alexa Martinez, commonly known by her stage name Brika, is an American singer and songwriter. She currently releases music under independent record label Art House Records. On February 23, 2015, Brika was included as one of New Music Seminar's 'Artist on the Verge' by "a hand-selected A&R committee comprised of NMS partners, talent scouts, buyers, booking agents, taste-makers and other industry experts", as reported by Billboard. Brika's music has circulated Annie Mac's Musical Hot Water Bottle program on BBC Radio 1.

== Early life and career ==
Brika was born in Miami and is of Cuban descent. Brika was intrigued with music since she was an infant, which eventually led to teaching herself how to play the piano and write her own songs.

She met music producer Julio Reyes Copello in 2011 and signed with his independent record label in 2013.

Her critically acclaimed record, Expectations, is considered to be her "breakout single" and was listed on the blog aggregator, Hype Machine's Zeitgeist Most Blogged and Favorited Tracks' with over 5 million streams on Spotify.

Her debut album, Voice Memos, circulated through college radio stations around North America and was listed on HillyDilly's Top 25 Debuts. The album had an exclusive premiere on Hype Machine a week before its official release, after climbing to the top of its 'Most Popular' Chart several times throughout the year. Notable blog Indie Shuffle listed Brika as an "Artist To Watch in 2015".

Brika took part in a performance with electronic artist Gryffin at Ultra Music Festival in 2015. More recently, Brika also performed with Kygo during the winter XGames 2016 live on ESPN (United States) Nationwide. Miami New Times wrote articles referring to her as "Miami Music's Next Big Thing" and "Ten Can't-Miss Local Acts of III Points 2016". The Miami New Times highlighted: "Her voice has an old-school quality that's rich with nuance and subtlety, rare these days."

NYLON placed Brika in their list of "7 Up-And-Coming Female Artists You Should Know About". She took part in Red Bull's esteemed SoundSelect festival alongside up-and-coming artist Goldlink. Brika was featured on Live Nation's One's To Watch alongside LANY, Léon, and many other artists.

== Artistry ==
Her sonic identity has been characterized as "alt-soul... simplistic yet powerful in nature" with a vocally "sultry tone". Brika has expressed that she draws inspiration from "bits and pieces of everything, even visuals". Journalist Brianne Nemiroff, of Viva Glam Magazine, has compared her sound to Billie Holiday and Banks.

== Discography ==
=== Albums ===
Voice Memos Deluxe

- Released: December 16, 2017
- Singles: "Expectations"
