= Monsieur Periné =

Colombian musical ensemble

- Catalina García and Santiago Prieto at the 2026 Latin Grammy Awards

Background information
- Also known as: Floripondios
- Origin: Bogotá, Colombia
- Years active: 2008–present
- Members: ‡Catalina García, lead vocals ‡Santiago Prieto, strings Miguel Guerra, percussion Jairo Alfonso, woodwinds Abstin Caviedes, brass Darwin Páez, drumset Eva Peroni, bass
- Past members: ‡Nicolás Junca, guitar ‡Camilo Parra, woodwinds Daniel Chebair, drumset Alejandro Giuliani, drumset David González, bass Fabián Peñaranda, bass Adinda Meertins, bass
- Website: Official website
- ‡ denotes founding members

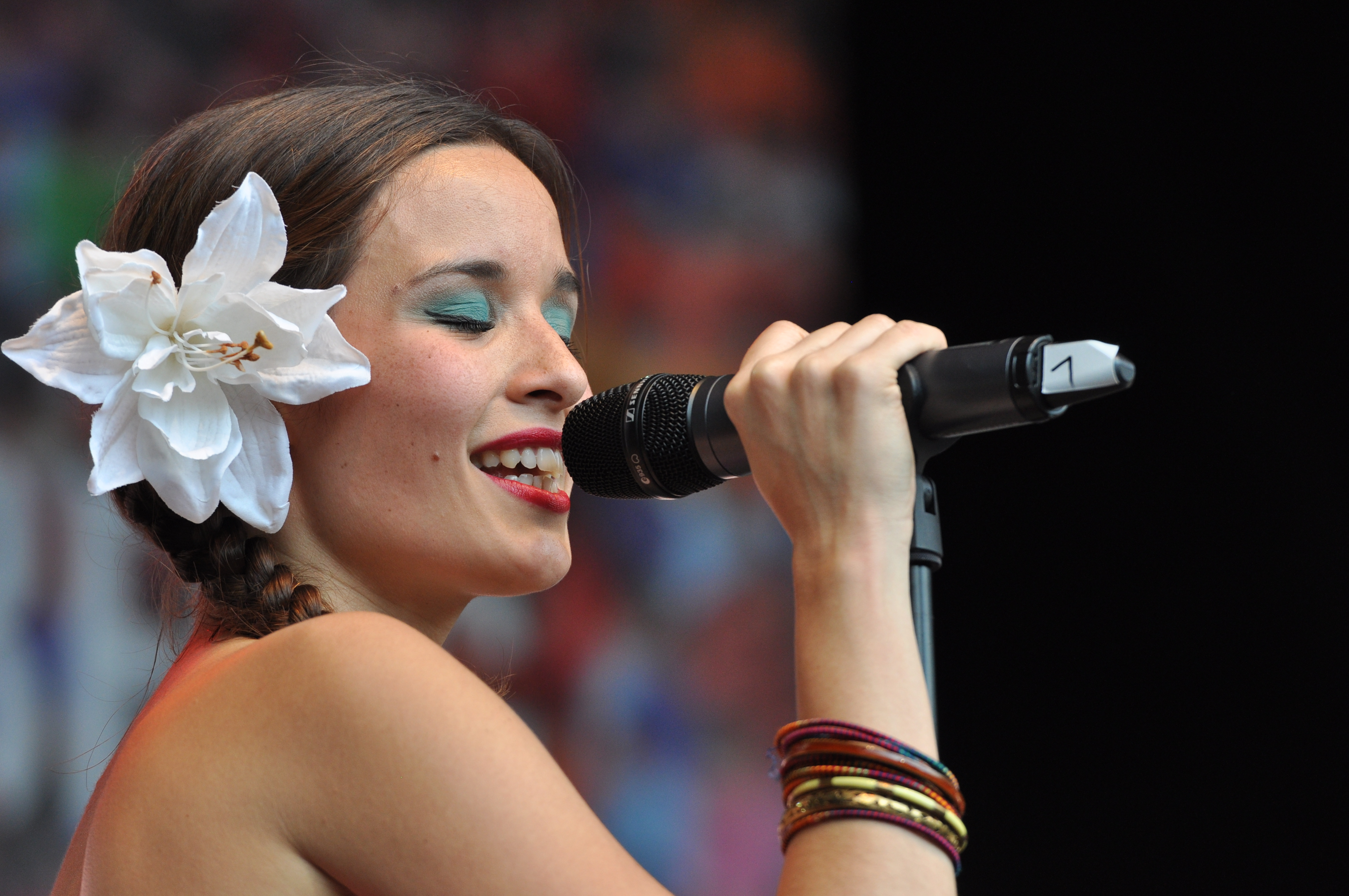
Vocalist Catalina García

Monsieur Periné is a Bogotá-based musical ensemble from Colombia with an Afro-Colombian sound that mixes Latin and European flavors. Lead singer Catalina García sings in a mixture of Spanish, French, English, and Portuguese. Other members include Santiago Prieto, who plays the charango, violin, and guitar; Eva Peroni on the bass; Jairo Alfonso on the winds (primarily saxophone and clarinet); Abstin Caviedes on the trombone and bugle; Miguel Guerra on percussion; and Darwin Paez on the drumset. Their style mixes elements of cumbia, tango, danzón, bolero and pop music, according to the San Diego Union Tribune. At the Latin Grammy Awards, the ensemble was named best new artist of 2015. Their debut album in 2012 won Colombia's national gold album award. The group was formed in 2008.

== History ==
=== Origin ===
Catalina García, a native of Cali, Colombia, studied in the French international school Lycée Français Paul Valéry de Cali (Spanish: Liceo Francés Paul Valéry de Cali). She later moved with her parents to the United States for two years before returning to Colombia. At eighteen, García moved to Bogotá to study anthropology at Javeriana University.

The main members of the group played together for the first time during Holy Week in 2007, in Villa de Leyva, a small town near Bogotá. Later, García, Santiago Prieto, Nicolás Junca and Camilo Parra (an early member who would later quit), began getting together frequently to play songs from various Latin American genres as well as jazz, which eventually prompted them to begin searching for their own voice.

During 2009 and 2010, they began performing locally in Bogotá; in 2009, they performed in several local music festivals. At the end of 2010, the group began composing its own original songs, recording "Ton Silence" and "Swing with Me".

In 2010, motivated by performing at the Ibero-American Theater Festival, they began to include the work of designer Alejandra Rivas Ramirez. However, it wasn't until 2011, when the group received a national award which allowed them to perform at the Estéreo Picnic Festival, that they began to develop the visual image of Monsieur Periné. This included the use of clothing designed by Rivas, an image concept design by her, and the work of plastics artist José Arboleda.

The band released their first single, "La Muerte", recorded with Felipe Álvarez, who works with artists such as Shakira and Bomba Estéreo. The radio station Radiónica named the song "Song of the Year", which was key in the development of the band.

In 2012, the band released its first music video for their song "Suin Romanticon".

In 2015, Camilo Parra left the band to work on his new project, Astrolabio. In 2015, drummer Alejandro Giuliani left the band, citing disagreements. The last to leave the project was Rivas Ramirez, the designer of the band's image as well as all of its costumes between 2010 and 2015.

=== Name and beginnings ===
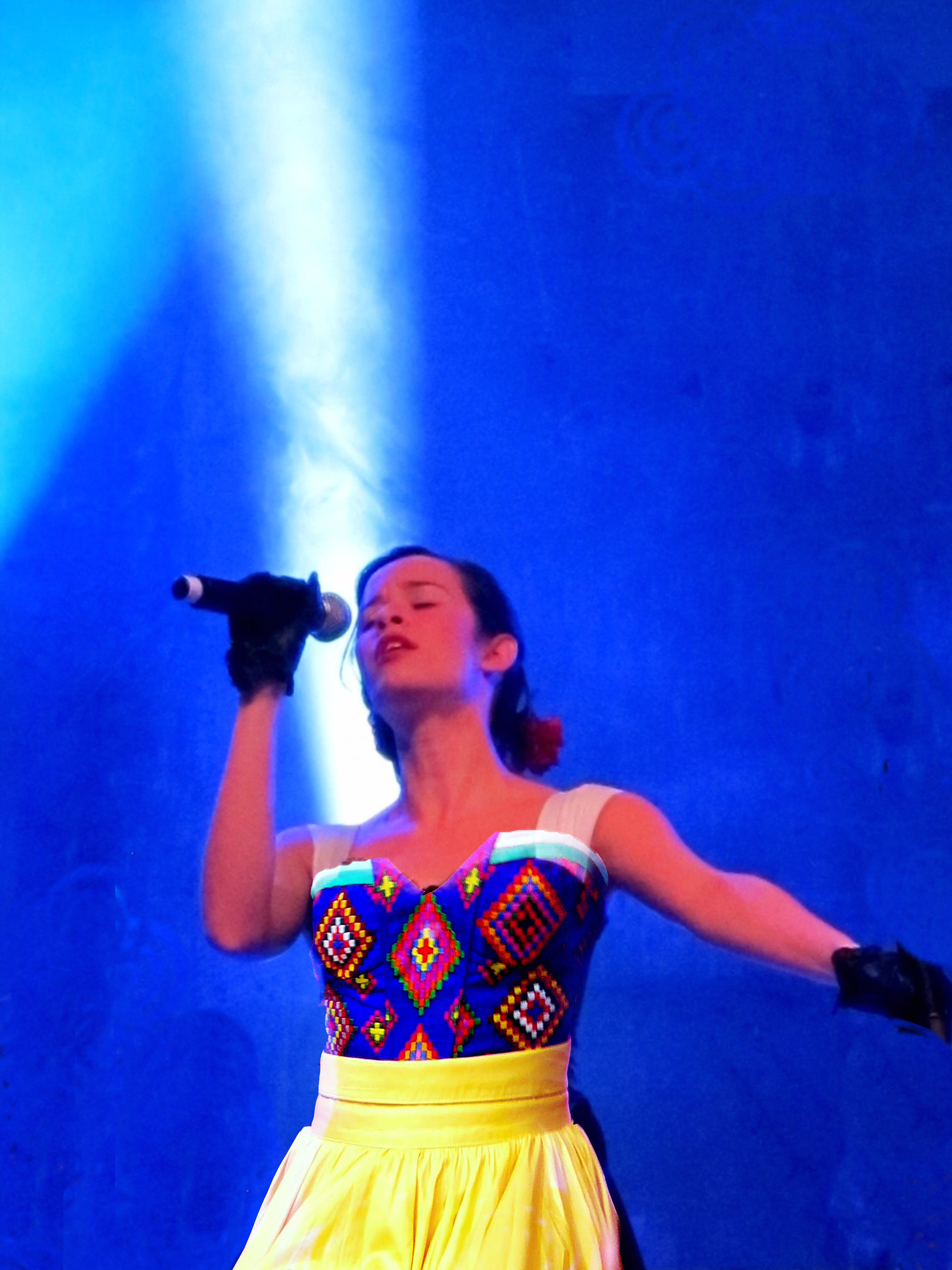
Catalina García performing at the World music festival Horizonte in Koblenz (2013)

The name of the group arose from Prieto's reading of Michel Houellebecq's The Elementary Particles, which discusses the périnée. The word became a joke among the group, and thus the original name was simply "Periné". García, who initially opposed the name, later added the word "Monsieur", referencing the idea that everything that is French is elegant and refined.

The group began with minor performances at weddings, corporate parties, and cocktail parties. They began to gain recognition in the auditorium of the Alianza Francesa, where they performed a cover of the movie The Triplets of Belleville, winning a competition focused on young talent. After this, David González and Miguel Guerra joined the group as double bassist and percussionist, respectively. They began performing at more major events at this time.

The first years of Monsieur Periné's existence served as an experimental period, during which the group sought to find their own style. They became more well known among the public following wins in two competitions, that of the Urock de Universia and El Ensayadero de Red Bull, where they performed "Be Pop". With this triumph they received a place at the Estereo Picnic Festival, after which Daniel Chebeir joined the band; however, he left two years later, citing personal issues. This left a vacancy in the drummer role, which would be filled by Argentinian Alejandro Giuliani, who accompanied the group on their European tour.

=== Hecho a Mano ===
In 2012, the band released its first album, entitled Hecho a Mano (English: Handmade). Hecho a Mano was certified gold in Colombia and was nominated for a number of categories in the Shock Awards (Spanish: Premios Shock), the largest music awards ceremony in Colombia, receiving two awards.

The album was released independently in Colombia. It was subsequently released in Mexico, Germany, and Japan. It was followed by the band's first European tour, titled Huracán, in 2013.

=== Caja de Música ===
In 2015, the band released its second album, entitled Caja de Música (English: Music Box). It led to the group winning Best New Artist at the 16th Annual Latin Grammy Awards, as well as being nominated for Best Album. It was released by Sony.

=== Encanto Tropical ===
In 2018, the band released its third album, entitled Encanto Tropical (English: Tropical Charm) Like Caja de Música, it was released by Sony and produced by Eduardo Cabra of the group Calle 13.

=== Bolero Apocalíptico ===
In 2023, the band released its fourth album, entitled Bolero Apocalíptico.

=== Instrucciones Para Ser Feliz ===
In 2026, the band released its fifth album, entitled Instrucciones Para Ser Feliz.

== Discography ==
- Hecho a Mano (2012)
- Caja de Música (2015)
- Encanto Tropical (2018)
- Bolero Apocalíptico (2023)
- Instrucciones Para Ser Feliz (2026)

== Awards and nominations ==
=== Grammy Awards ===
Year	Nominee / work	Award	Result
2016	Caja de Música	Best Latin Rock, Urban or Alternative Album	Nominated
2019	Encanto Tropical	Best Latin Rock, Urban or Alternative Album	Nominated

=== Latin Grammy Awards ===
Year	Nominee / work	Award	Result
2015	Monsieur Periné	Best New Artist	Won
2015	Caja de Música	Album of the Year	Nominated
2018	Encanto Tropical	Album of the Year	Nominated
2018	"Bailar Contigo"	Record of the Year	Nominated
2018	"Bailar Contigo"	Song of the Year	Nominated
2023	Bolero Apocalíptico	Best Alternative Music Album	Won
2023	"Bailo Pa Ti"	Best Pop Song	Nominated
2024	"Catalina"	Record of the Year	Nominated
