= 2019 in Latin music =

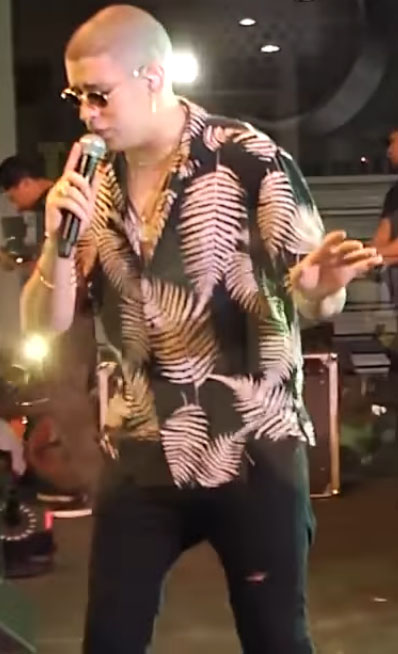
Puerto Rican rapper Bad Bunny was named Top Latin Artist of the Year in the United States by Billboard.

The following is a list of events and releases that happened in 2019 in Latin music. The list covers events and releases from Latin regions from the Spanish- and Portuguese-speaking areas of Latin America and the Iberian Peninsula.

== Events ==
=== January–March ===
- February 10 – The 61st Annual Grammy Awards are held at the Staples Center in Los Angeles, California.
  - Sincera by Argentine singer and lyricist Claudia Brant wins Best Latin Pop Album.
  - Aztlán by Mexican band Zoé wins Best Latin Rock, Urban or Alternative Album.
  - ¡México Por Siempre! by Mexican singer Luis Miguel wins Best Regional Mexican Music Album.
  - Anniversary by American-based orchestra Spanish Harlem Orchestra wins Best Tropical Latin Album.
  - Back to the Sunset by Cuban-American musician Dafnis Prieto and his band wins Best Latin Jazz Album.
- February 21 – The 31st Annual Lo Nuestro Awards are held at the American Airlines Arena in Miami, Florida. Puerto Rican singer Ozuna is the biggest winner, with nine awards. The Album of the Year category was removed due to a tendency in Latin pop music about releasing non-album singles.
  - Colombian singer J Balvin wins Artist of the Year.
  - "Me Niego" by Reik featuring Ozuna and Wisin wins Song of the Year and Collaboration of the Year.
  - Brazilian singer Roberto Carlos receives the Excellence Award. Puerto Rican rapper Daddy Yankee and American band Intocable receive the Lifetime Achievement Award.
- February 25 – "Despacito" by Luis Fonsi featuring Daddy Yankee becomes the first YouTube video to reach six billion views on the site.
- March 5 – The 27th Annual ASCAP Latin Awards are held at the El San Juan Hotel in San Juan, Puerto Rico.
  - "I Like It" by Cardi B, Bad Bunny, and J Balvin wins Song of the Year.
  - Daddy Yankee wins Songwriter/Artist of the Year. Colombian singer Maluma wins Songwriter of the Year.
  - Puerto Rican singer, lyricist and producer Draco Rosa receives the Vanguard Award. Dominican singer Milly Quezada receives the Heritage Award.
- March 14 – The 6th iHeartRadio Music Awards are held at the Microsoft Theater in Los Angeles, California.
  - Bad Bunny wins Latin Artist of the Year.
  - Vibras by J Balvin wins Latin Album of the Year.
  - "X" by Nicky Jam and J Balvin wins Latin Song of the Year.
- March 20 – The 26th Annual BMI Latin Awards are held at the Beverly Wilshire Hotel in Beverly Hills, California.
  - "Mi Gente" by J Balvin and Willy William wins Contemporary Latin Song of the Year.
  - Ozuna and Puerto Rican manager and songwriter Vicente Saavedra win Contemporary Latin Songwriter of the Year.
  - Argentine producer Sebastian Krys receives the Champion Award. Mexican singer Mario Quintero Lara, vocalist of Los Tucanes de Tijuana, receives the President's Award.
- March 21 – In response to the lack of nominees for reggaeton and Latin trap albums at the Grammy Awards, Telemundo launched the Premios Tu Música Urbano in Puerto Rico. These are the second Latin urban-oriented awards, following the People's Choice Reggaeton and Urban Awards, which lasted from 2005 to 2007. The 1st Premios Tu Música Urbano are held at the José Miguel Agrelot Coliseum in San Juan, Puerto Rico. Ozuna is the biggest winner with six awards.
  - Ozuna wins Artist of the Year.
  - Aura by Ozuna wins Album of the Year.
  - "Dura" by Daddy Yankee wins Song of the Year.
- March 27 – The Recording Industry Association of America (RIAA) reports that the Latin music industry in the United States grew 18% in 2018 to $413 million in revenue, with streaming comprising 93% of its market. Revenues from on-demand and ad-supported services including YouTube, Vevo and Spotify grew 34%. Latin music sales comprise 6% of its total revenue in the United States. Sales from digital downloads and physical albums decreased 23% and 63% in comparison to 2017, respectively.

=== April–June ===
- April 2 – The International Federation of the Phonographic Industry (IFPI) reports that Latin America shows the highest regional growth for a fourth consecutive year, with a revenue increase of 16.8%.
  - "Despacito" by Luis Fonsi and Daddy Yankee featuring Justin Bieber is the best-selling Spanish-language song of 2018 and the sixth overall, with 11.8 million sales plus track-equivalent streams in the world.
- April 13 – J Balvin becomes the first ever reggaeton-singing act to ever perform at Coachella. Other Spanish-singing acts include Los Tucanes de Tijuana, Bad Bunny, Rosalía, Mon Laferte and Javiera Mena among others.
- April 25 – The 26th Annual Billboard Latin Music Awards are held at the Mandalay Bay Events Center in Las Vegas, Nevada. Ozuna breaks the record of most wins in a single edition of the awards, with 11.
  - Ozuna wins Artist of the Year.
  - "Te Boté" by Casper Mágico, Nio García, Darell, Nicky Jam, Ozuna, and Bad Bunny wins Hot Latin Song of the Year.
  - Odisea by Ozuna wins Top Latin Album of the Year.
  - Dominican musician Juan Luis Guerra receives the Lifetime Achievement Award.
- May 1 – The 26th Annual Billboard Music Awards are held at the MGM Grand Garden Arena in Las Vegas, Nevada.
  - Ozuna wins Top Latin Artist.
  - Aura by Ozuna wins Top Latin Album.
  - "Te Boté" by Casper Mágico, Nio García, Darell, Nicky Jam, Ozuna, and Bad Bunny wins Top Latin Song.
- May 13 – The 4th Heat Latin Music Awards are held at the Hard Rock Hotel and Casino in Punta Cana, Dominican Republic.
  - J Balvin and Karol G win Best Male and Female Artist, respectively. Zion & Lennox win Best Group or Band.
  - "Pineapple" by Karol G wins Best Video.
  - "Amantes" by Greeicy featuring Mike Bahía wins Best Collaboration.
- May 14 – The 21st Premios Gardel take place at Ángel Bustelo Auditorium in Mendoza to celebrate the best in Argentinian music.
  - Prender un Fuego by Marilina Bertoldi wins Album of the Year.
  - "Sin Querer Queriendo" by Lali featuring Mau y Ricky wins Song of the Year.
  - "Studio 2" by Escalandrum wins Record of the Year.
  - Destino San Javier win Best New Artist.
- May 18 – J Balvin becomes he first ever reggaeton-singing act to ever perform on Saturday Night Live.

=== July–September ===
- July 3 – Seven years after Jenni Rivera's death, "Aparentemente Bien" was posthumously released by Rivera's family on what would have been her 50th birthday. The song was found in a hard drive by Rivera's brother Juan.
- July 9—13 – The 20th Latin Alternative Music Conference is held in New York City.
- July 17 – Following a series of scandals involving Puerto Rican governor Ricardo Rosselló, Puerto Rican recording artists Residente, ILE, and Bad Bunny released "Afilando Los Cuchillos" as a protest to corruption in the Puerto Rican government. Bad Bunny also postponed his tour in Europe to join the protests.
- August 3 – J Balvin becomes the first ever Latin artist to headline Lollapalooza Chicago.
- August 26 – The music video for "Con Altura" by Rosalía and J Balvin featuring El Guincho, directed by Director X, wins the MTV Video Music Award for Best Latin Video. Rosalía became the first ever Spanish act to ever win a VMA. "Con Altura" also won the Best Choreography category.
- September 24 – The nominees for the 20th Annual Latin Grammy Awards are announced and is met with backlash by the urbano music community due to the lack of nominations of urbano artists in the general field. This resulted in several urbano artists to boycott the Latin Grammys.

=== October–December ===
- November 3 – The 26th MTV Europe Music Awards take place at the FIBES Conference and Exhibition Centre in Seville.
  - Pabllo Vittar wins Best Brazilian Act.
  - Mon Laferte wins Best Latin America North Act.
  - Sebastián Yatra wins Best Latin America Central Act.
  - J Mena wins Best Latin America South Act.
  - Fernando Daniel wins Best Portuguese Act.
  - Lola Indigo wins Best Spanish Act.
- November 8 – The 14th LOS40 Music Awards take place at the WiZink Center in Madrid.
  - Rosalía wins Best Spanish Artist.
  - Nuclear by Leiva wins Best Spanish Album.
  - "Lo Siento" by Beret wins Best Spanish Song.
  - "De Tus Ojos" by Vanesa Martín wins Best Spanish Video.
- November 14 – The 20th Annual Latin Grammy Awards are held at the MGM Grand Garden Arena in Las Vegas, Nevada:
  - "Mi Persona Favorita" by Alejandro Sanz and Camila Cabello wins Record of the Year.
  - El Mal Querer by Rosalía wins Album of the Year.
  - "Calma" by Pedro Capó wins Song of the Year.
  - Venezuelan singer Nella wins Best New Artist.

== Number-one albums and singles by country ==
- List of Billboard Argentina Hot 100 number-one singles of 2019
- List of number-one albums of 2019 (Mexico)
- List of number-one songs of 2019 (Mexico)
- List of number-one albums of 2019 (Portugal)
- List of number-one albums of 2019 (Spain)
- List of number-one singles of 2019 (Spain)
- List of number-one Billboard Latin Albums from the 2010s
- List of number-one Billboard Hot Latin Songs of 2019
- List of number-one Billboard Regional Mexican Songs of 2019

== Spanish-language songs on the Billboard Hot 100 ==
In 2019, a total of 20 Spanish-language songs have debuted in the Billboard Hot 100 and other four charted from the previous year. From the Latin songs released in 2019, "Con Calma" by Daddy Yankee and Katy Perry featuring Snow was the highest-peaking of the year, having reached number 22. "Vete" by Bad Bunny became the highest debut in the history of the Hot 100 for a completely-Spanish-language song by a solo act with no accompanying artists.

Song	Performer(s)	Entry	Peak	Weeks	Ref.
"Taki Taki"	DJ Snake featuring Selena Gomez, Ozuna, and Cardi B	October 13, 2018	11	26	
"Mía"	Bad Bunny featuring Drake	October 27, 2018	5	27	
"Ella Quiere Beber"	Anuel AA and Romeo Santos	November 17, 2018	61	20	
"Feliz Navidad"	José Feliciano	December 22, 2018	29	3	(Note: "Feliz Navidad" by José Feliciano has charted in 2017 and 2018 for two weeks each year and in 2019 for four weeks.)
2019 debuts
"Solo de Mí"	Bad Bunny	January 12, 2019	93	1	
"Secreto"	Anuel AA and Karol G	February 2, 2019	68	10	
"Con Calma"	Daddy Yankee and Katy Perry featuring Snow (Note: The original version of "Con Calma" by Daddy Yankee featuring Snow peaked at number 48 on March 30, 2019. Its chart placement was improved after the release of a remix version featuring Katy Perry on April 19, 2017.)	February 9, 2019	22	25	
"Calma"	Pedro Capó and Farruko	March 23, 2019	71	20	
"Inmortal"	Aventura	April 20, 2019	95	1	
"Baila Baila Baila"	Ozuna featuring Daddy Yankee, J Balvin, Farruko, and Anuel AA	May 11, 2019	69	9	
"Soltera"	Lunay featuring Bad Bunny and Daddy Yankee	May 25, 2019	71	12	
"Te Robaré"	Nicky Jam and Ozuna	May 25, 2019	91	6	
"HP"	Maluma	June 8, 2019	96	1	
"Callaíta"	Bad Bunny and Tainy	June 22, 2019	52	20	
"Amor Genuino"	Ozuna	June 22, 2019	92	1	
"Otro Trago"	Sech and Darell featuring Nicky Jam, Ozuna, and Anuel AA	June 22, 2019	34	20	
"Qué Pretendes"	J Balvin and Bad Bunny	July 13, 2019	65	5	
"No Me Conoce"	Jhay Cortez featuring J Balvin and Bad Bunny	July 20, 2019	71	14	
"China"	Anuel AA, Daddy Yankee, and Karol G featuring Ozuna and J Balvin	August 3, 2019	43	17	
"La Canción"	J Balvin and Bad Bunny	September 14, 2019	84	8	
"Adicto"	Tainy, Anuel AA, and Ozuna	October 5, 2019	86	2	
"Tusa"	Karol G and Nicki Minaj	November 23, 2019	78	3	
"Ritmo"	The Black Eyed Peas and J Balvin	November 30, 2019	89	4	
"Vete"	Bad Bunny	December 7, 2019	33	4	
"Feliz Navidad"	José Feliciano	December 14, 2019	23	3	

== Sales and streaming ==
=== United States ===
In July 2019, Nielsen SoundScan reported that equivalent album units for Latin music in the United States totaled 10.2 million in the tracking period of January 4 through June 20, 2019.

Best-selling albums (equivalent units)

Rank	Album	Performer	Units (Note: Equivalent album units are based on album sales, track equivalent albums (10 tracks sold equals one album sale), and streaming equivalent albums (3,750 ad-supported streams or 1,250 paid subscription streams equals one album sale).)
1	X 100Pre	Bad Bunny	425,000
2	Aura	Ozuna	161,000
3	Odisea	Ozuna	139,000
4	Vida	Luis Fonsi	126,000
5	Real Hasta La Muerte	Anuel AA	123,000
6	Gangalee	Farruko	111,000
7	Ocean	Karol G	94,000
8	Vibras	J Balvin	81,000
9	Todavía Me Amas: Lo Mejor de Aventura	Aventura	75,000
10	Utopía	Romeo Santos	71,000

Best-selling albums (traditional sales)

Rank	Album	Performer	Sales
1	Africa Speaks	Santana	63,000
2	Vida	Luis Fonsi	29,000
3	Utopía	Romeo Santos	18,000
4	Opus	Marc Anthony	13,000
5	Fantasía	Sebastián Yatra	9,000
6	IllumiNatti	Natti Natasha	8,000
6	X 100Pre	Bad Bunny	8,000
8	11:11	Maluma	5,000
8	Aztlán	Zoe	5,000
8	Ones	Selena	5,000

Best-selling songs

Rank	Song	Performer	Sales
1	"Con Calma"	Daddy Yankee and Katy Perry featuring Snow	120,000
2	"Taki Taki"	DJ Snake featuring Selena Gomez, Ozuna, and Cardi B	77,000
3	"Mía"	Bad Bunny featuring Drake	66,000
4	"Calma"	Pedro Capó and Farruko	60,000
5	"Despacito"	Luis Fonsi and Daddy Yankee featuring Justin Bieber	45,000
6	"Baila Baila Baila"	Ozuna featuring Daddy Yankee, J Balvin, Farruko, and Anuel AA	31,000
7	"Secreto"	Anuel AA and Karol G	30,000
8	"Ella Quiere Beber"	Anuel AA and Romeo Santos	23,000
9	"Lost in the Middle of Nowhere"	Kane Brown featuring Becky G	22,000
10	"Medellín"	Madonna and Maluma	21,000

Most-streamed songs

Rank	Song	Performer	Streams
1	"Taki Taki"	DJ Snake featuring Selena Gomez, Ozuna, and Cardi B	259,354,000
2	"Despacito"	Luis Fonsi and Daddy Yankee featuring Justin Bieber	254,075,000
3	"Mía"	Bad Bunny featuring Drake	235,580,000
4	"Con Calma"	Daddy Yankee and Katy Perry featuring Snow	216,217,000
5	"Calma"	Pedro Capó and Farruko	204,064,000
6	"Mi Gente"	J Balvin and Willy William featuring Beyoncé	181,563,000
7	"Secreto"	Anuel AA and Karol G	159,635,000
8	"Ella Quiere Beber"	Anuel AA and Romeo Santos	148,234,000
9	"Te Boté"	Casper Mágico, Nio García, Darell, Nicky Jam, Ozuna, and Bad Bunny	137,005,000
10	"Nunca Es Suficiente"	Los Ángeles Azules featuring Natalia Lafourcade	112,788,000

== Awards ==
=== Latin music awards ===
- 2019 Lo Nuestro Awards
- 2019 Billboard Latin Music Awards
- 2019 Latin American Music Awards
- 2019 Latin Grammy Awards
- 2019 Heat Latin Music Awards
- 2019 MTV Millennial Awards

=== Awards with Latin categories ===
- 2019 Billboard Music Awards
- 2019 Grammy Awards
- 2019 iHeartRadio Music Awards
- 2019 MTV Video Music Awards
- 2019 Teen Choice Awards

== Albums released ==
=== First-quarter ===
==== January ====
Day	Title	Artist	Genre(s)	Singles	Label
11	Lo Nuestro (En Vivo)	Yelsy Heredia	Tropical		Bis Music
25	Reflexión	Ana Guerra	Latin pop		Universal Music Spain
25	Andrés Cepeda Big Band (En Vivo)	Andrés Cepeda	Tropical		Sony Music
25	Las Canciones de la Abuela	Buyuchek y La Abuela Irma Silva	Norteño		Fonovisa
25	¿Hay Alguien en Casa?	Mucho	Indie pop		Kartoffel Kollektiv
29	Solosh	Eddie Mora Bermúdez and Orquesta Sinfónica de Heredia	Classical		Asociación Sinfónica De Heredia

==== February ====
Day	Title	Artist	Genre(s)	Singles	Label
1	Vida	Luis Fonsi	Latin pop	"Despacito" "Échame la Culpa" "Calypso" "Imposible" "Sola"	Universal Latin
1	Turning Pages	Claudia Acuña	Latin jazz		Delfín
8	Mujeres	Y La Bamba	Latin alternative		Tender Loving Empire
8	Cambio de Clima	Bryant Myers and Miky Woodz	Urban		La Commission
8	Para Aventuras y Curiosidades	Mau y Ricky	Pop		
8	Heroes en Tiempos de Guerra	David Bustamante	Pop		Universal Music Spain
8	Mi Persona Preferida	El Bebeto	Mariachi/ranchera		Disa
8	Besta Fera	Jards Macalé	MPB		Zilles Produções
8	Hora Certa	Paula Fernandes	Música sertaneja		Universal Music
15	illumiNATTI	Natti Natasha	Reggaeton, Latin pop	"Quien Sabe" "Me Gusta" "Lamento Tu Perdida" "Pa Mala Yo "La Mejor Version de Mi"	Pina, Sony Latin
15	Yo Me Llamo Cumbia	Puerto Candelaria and Juancho Valencia	Cumbia		Merlín Producciones, Peerless
15	Extrapolaciones y Dos Preguntas 1989-2000	Fangoria	Pop		Warner Music Spain
15	O Futuro Não Demora	BaianaSystem	Brazilian rock		Toca Discos
22	Para Que No Te Lo Imagines	Saul Alarcón	Banda		Fonovisa
22	Em Todos Os Cantos	Marília Mendonça	Música sertaneja		Som Livre
22	Más Futuro Que Pasado	Juanes	Latin pop		Universal Music Latino
22	Good Vibes, Buenas Vibras	Tr3r Elemento	Regional Mexican		DEL
25	Memorías de Navidad	Víctor Manuelle	Christmas, Tropical		Sony Music Latin
26	Roto	Enrique Campos	Tango		Acqua
28	Llego La Queen	Ivy Queen	Reggaeton, dancehall	"Pal Frente y Pa Tras" "Llego La Queen"	La Commission
28	Puro Pa'DELita (En Vivo)	Abraham Vázquez	Regional Mexican		DEL

==== March ====
Day	Title	Artist	Genre(s)	Singles	Label
1	Oh Long Johnson	Miss Caffeina	Dance-pop		Warner Music Spain
8	Conexión	Juan Pablo Vega			N
8	LOST	Alex Rose			Los Oídos Fresh
12	Tempo Mínimo	Delia Fischer	MPB		Nomad Música
15	Percepción	Intocable	Norteño		Fonovisa
15	Sigue la Dinastía	Alex Fernández	Ranchera		Columbia
15	Mart'nália Canta Vinicius de Moraes	Mart'nália	Samba		Biscoito Fino
15	America	Claudio Constantini	Classical		Biscoito Fino
22	Me Hiciste un Borracho	La Trakalosa de Monterrey	Regional Mexican		Remex
22	La Gran Esfera	La Casa Azul	Electropop		Elefant Records
22	54 + 1	Danny Ocean	Reggaeton		Atlantic
22	Nuclear	Leiva	Pop rock		Sony Music Spain
22	Goela Abaixo	Liniker e os Caramelows	Brazilian rock		Independente
26	Cuba: The Legacy	Enrique Pérez Mesa and the National Symphony Orchestra of Cuba	Classical		Rycy Productions
27	Preto No Branco 3	Preto No Branco	Latin Christian		Universal Music, Balaio Music
27	Mi Lógico Desorden	Roi Méndez	Pop		Universal Music Spain
29	4 Latidos Tour: En Vivo	Camila and Sin Bandera	Latin pop		Columbia
29	The One	Yandel	Reggaeton		La Leyenda
29	Selfie	Jair Oliveira	Brazilian pop		S de Samba, Ditto Brasil
29	Nana Caymmi Canta Tito Madi	Nana Caymmi	MPB		Biscoito Fino
29	Rei Caipira	Zé Mulato and Cassiano	MPB		Biscoito Fino

=== Second quarter ===
==== April ====
Day	Title	Artist	Genre(s)	Singles	Label
4	#ElDisco	Alejandro Sanz	Latin pop	"No Tengo Nada" "Back in the City" "Mi Persona Favorita"	Universal Music Spain
4	Mi Viaje (En Vivo)	Danilo Montero	Latin Christian		Sígueme Internacional
5	Utopia	Romeo Santos	Bachata	"Inmortal"	Sony Music Latin
5	Te Lo Dijé	Miguel	Hip hop		ByStorm Entertainment
5	Kisses	Anitta	Pop music, Latin pop, reggaeton, funk carioca, electropop	"Poquito" "Banana" "Onda Diferente" "Rosa"	Warner Music Brasil
5	Así Me Enseñaron	David Lee Rodriguez	Tejano		VMB Music Group
5	360º	Eli Soares	Latin Christian		
5	Buenos Diaz	The Lucky Band	Latin Christian		Rainy Day Dimes Music
12	Fantasía	Sebastián Yatra	Latin pop		Universal Music Latino
12	El OG Week	Miky Woodz			Gold2 Latin Music
12	Basado en Hechos Reales	Carajo			Independent
12	Unbalanced: Concerto For Ensemble	Moisés P. Sánchez			Uno Música
12	De Mar y Río	Canalón de Timbiquí	Folk		Llorona
12	De brujas, peteneras y chachalacas	La Bruja de Texcoco			
18	Sueños	Sech	Latin trap	"Otro Trago"	Rich Music
19	Careta	Rodrigo Crespo	Rock	"Conectar"	Che Robot
22	Regreso	Nueva Filarmonía and Samuel Torres	Classical		Independiente
26	Gangalee	Farruko	Reggaeton, Latin trap		Sony Music Latin
26	Carolina Durante	Carolina Durante	Rock	"Las Canciones de Juanita"	Sonido Muchacho
26	Pol Granch	Pol Granch	Pop	"Perdón Por Las Horas"	Sony Music Spain
26	55 Aniverario	Mario Ortíz All Star Band	Salsa		All Star Music
26	Algo Ritmo	Kevin Johansen			Sony Music Argentina
26	Matriz	Pitty	Brazilian rock		Deckdisc
30	Ajo	Foli Griô Orquestra	Brazilian roots		Foli Griô Orquestra, Tratore

==== May ====
Day	Title	Artist	Genre(s)	Singles	Label
1	Luces, Cámara, Acción	Claraluna	Latin children's music		Claraluna
1	Sorte!: Music By John Finbur	Thalma de Freitas with Vítor Gonçalves, John Patitucci, Chico Pinheiro, Rogerio Boccato & Duduka Da Fonseca	Latin jazz		
3	Ocean	Karol G	Reggaeton	"Pineapple" "Mi Cama" "Culpables" "Crèeme" "Punto G" "Ocean" "Love with Quality"	Universal Music Latino
3	Alcohol & Sullivans	Albany	Hip-Hop		Independent
3	O Amor no Caos, Vol. 1	Zeca Baleiro	MPB		Onerpm
6	Padre Mío	Ricardo Torres y su Mariachi	Latin Christian		Independiente
6	Bim Bom Bam!	Payasitas Ni Fu Ni Fa	Latin children's		Nifu Nifa Oficial
7	A Journey Through Cuban Music	Aymée Nuviola	Tropical		Top Stop Music
8	En Medio De Este Ruido	Kurt			
10	Ahora	Christian Nodal	Ranchera, mariachi	"No Te Contaron Mal" "Nada Nuevo" "De Los Besos Que Te Di"	Fonovisa
10	Opus	Marc Anthony	Salsa music	"Tu Vida en la Mía" "Parecen Viernes" "Lo Que Te Di"	Sony Music Latin
10	Climaxxx	Dalex	Reggaeton		Rich Music
10	Visceral	Paula Arenas	Latin pop	"Buena Para Nada"	Sony Music Colombia
10	Lebón & Co.	David Lebón	Pop rock		Sony Music Colombia
10	Almadura	ILE	Latin alternative		Sony Music Latin
12	Saxofones Live Sessions	Cuban Sax Quintet			Egrem
15	Para Mis Maestros con Respecto	Juan Piña	Vallenato		Vibra Entertainment
15	Tropicalia	Ilegales	Merengue		Dotel Entertainment
17	11:11	Maluma	Reggaeton, Latin trap	"HP" "11 PM"	Sony Music Latin
17	Contra el Viento	Kany García	Latin pop	"Quédate" "Remamos"	Sony Music Latin
17	Paraíso Road Gang	Rubén Blades		"El País"	R B
17	Akelarre	Lola Indigo	Latin pop	"Ya No Quiero Ná"	Universal Spain
17	Atracción	Carlos Right	Latin pop	"Se Te Nota"	Universal Spain
17	Nostalgia	Daniela Brooker			
17	19	Feid	Urbano		Intu Linea
17	Otra Ruta	8 y Más	Tropical		Unity Entertainment
17	Orinoco	Cimarrón	Folk		Independiente
17	Marrón y Azul	Daniel Binelli and Nick Danielson	Tango		Bell Ville
23	¡Spangled!	Gaby Moreno and Van Dyke Parks	Latin pop		Nonesuch
23	Homerun	Paulo Londra	Latin trap	"Condenado Para El Millón" "Nena Maldición" "Dímelo" "Chica Paranormal" "Adán y Eva" "Forever Alone" "Tal Vez" "Solo Pienso En Ti" "Por Eso Vine"	Warner Music Latina
24	Famouz	Jhay Cortez	Reggaeton	"No Me Conoce"	N&E Entertainment
24	Más de Mi	Tony Succar	Salsa	"Más de Mi"	Unity Entertainment
24	Montaner	Ricardo Montaner	Latin pop	"No Me Hagas Daño"	Sony Music Latin
24	Candela	Vicente García	Tropical		Sony Music Colombia
24	Milly & Co.	Milly Quezada	Merengue		Los Vecinos Enterprises
24	Tiempo Al Tiempo	Luis Enrique and C4 Trío	Folk		Chazz Music, Empire
24	Dormida	Belén Aguilera	Pop		Universal Spain
24	Radiotango	Pablo Ziegler Chamber Quartet	Tango		Zoho Music
24	Macumbas e Catimbós	Alessandra Leão	Brazilian roots		YB music
26	Balance	Gustavo Casenave			Fula
27	Electra	Alice Caymmi	MPB, samba	"Diplomacia"	Joia Moderna
31	Pa Las Vibras	Herencia de Patrones	Regional Mexican		Rancho Humilde
31	Ahora	Reik	Latin pop	"Me niego" "Amigos Con Derechos" "Ráptame" "Duele"	Sony Music Mexico
31	El Circo	El Fantasma	Regional Mexican		Afinarte Music
31	40... y Contando: En Vivo Desde Puerto Rico	Gilberto Santa Rosa	Salsa		Sony Music Latin
31	Realidad	Justin Quiles	Reggaeton		Warner Music Latina
31	Literal	Juan Luis Guerra & 4:40	Bachata, merengue	"Kitipun" "Corazón Enamorado" "I Love You More"	Universal Music Latino
31	La Llave del Son	Septeto Acarey	Tropical	"El Afortunado"(featuring Luis Enrique)	Septeto Acarey
31	Acústica	Albita			InnerCat Music Group
31	Indestructible	Flor de Toloache	Mariachi		Flor de Toloache
31	Por Más	Bronco	Norteño		Sony Music Mexico
31	Tarântula	As Bahias e a Cozinha Mineira	Brazilian pop		Independente
31	Tudo É Um	Zélia Duncan	MPB		Biscoito Fino
31	Canta Las Letras	123 Andrés	Latin children's		Salsana
31	Mariachitlán	Juan Pablo Contreras, Marco Parisotto, and Orquesta Filarmónica de Jalisco			Universal Music México
31	Anonimas y Resilientes	Voces del Bullerengue			Chaco World Music
31	Caminando	Joss Favela	Regional Mexican		
31	Poco a Poco	La Energía Norteña	Regional Mexican		
31	Ruido	La Prohibida	Super pop		Ultradiscos
31	20 Aniversario	Mariachi Divas de Cindy Shea	Regional Mexican		

==== June ====
Day	Title	Artist	Genre(s)	Singles	Label
5	Eternal Gratitude	Domingo Pagliuca and Paulina Leisring	Classical		Independiente
7	Spoiler	Aitana	Pop	"Nada Sale Mal"	Universal Music Spain
7	Africa Speaks	Santana	Latin rock	"Breaking Down the Door"	Concord
7	La BESTia	Almity	Urban		TUAlmighty
7	Árboles de vidrio	Edith Ruiz	Classical		Urtext Digital Classics
7	Carib	David Sánchez	Latin jazz		
14	Nuestros Principios	Cepeda	Pop	"Mi Reino" "Vuela"	Universal Music Spain
14	¿Dónde Jugarán Lxs Niñxs? (Desde El Palacio De Los Deportes)	Molotov	Rock en español		Universal Music Mexico
14	Samba Jazz, de Raiz Cláudio Jorge 70	Cláudio Jorge	Samba		Mills
21	Otras Alas	Natalia Lacunza	Glitch pop	"Nana Triste"	Universal Music Spain
28	Escencia	Mariachi Herencia de Mexico	Mariachi		Mariachi Heritage Foundation
28	Oasis	J Balvin and Bad Bunny	Latin trap, reggaeton	"Qué Pretendes"	Universal Latin
28	Antidote	Chick Corea & The Spanish Heart Band	Latin jazz		
28	E U R O C O C A	Pedro LaDroga	Trap pop		Universal Spain
28	Reciente (Adelanto)	El David Aguilar	Singer-songwriter		Universal Music Mexico
29	Comme il faut	Pablo Estigarribia, Victor Lavallen, and Horacio Cabarcos	Tango		Independent

=== Third quarter ===
==== July ====
Day	Title	Artist	Genre(s)	Singles	Label
4	Del Barrio Hasta Aquí	Fuerza Regida	Regional Mexican		Rancho Humilde
4	Perreando Por Fuera, Llorando Por Dentro	Ms Nina	Pop trap		Universal Spain
5	25th Anniversary Contigo	Jay Perez	Tejano		Freddie
9	Reino	Aline Barros	Latin Christian		Sony Music Brasil
10	Guaia	Marcelo Jeneci	Latin pop		Slap
12	Perfecta	Banda Los Recoditos	Banda	"Perfecta"	Fonovisa
26	Na Mão As Flores	Suricato	Brazilian rock		Universal Music International
Origens (Ao Vivo Em Sete Lagoas, Brazil / 2019)	Paula Fernandes	Música sertaneja		[Universal Music International	

==== August ====
Day	Title	Artist	Genre(s)	Singles	Label
2	Undotrecua	Miguel Mateos	Rock en español		Miguel Mateos
2	Incomunicación	Vetamadre	Rock en español		Sony Music Argentina
3	Contemporary Tango Trilogy	Alejandro Fasanini	Tango		Artphonus
16	Simplemente Gracias	Calibre 50	Regional Mexican		Andaluz
16	Jueves	El Cuarteto de Nos	Rock en español		Sony Music Argentina
16	Pa'lante	Ernesto Fernandez	Tropical		Independent
16	Live in México	La Mafia	Tejano		Fonovisa
16	Fuelle y Cuerda	Gustavo Casenave Quartet	Tango		Audio Network
16	Hay Más	Hillsong Worship	Latin Christian		Hillsong Worship
20	Tango Sacro	Rodolfo Mederos	Tango		Naku
20	Puertos: Music from International Waters	Emilio Solla Tango Jazz Orchestra	Latin jazz		Avantango
23	En Letra de Otro	Farruko	Reggaeton		Sony Music Latin
23	ADN	Manuel Turizo	Reggaeton	"Una Lady Como Tú"	Sony Music Latin
23	De Ayer para Siempre	Mariachi los Camperos	Mariachi		
30	Circo Soledad: En Vivo	Ricardo Arjona	Latin pop		Metamorfosis
30	Sonero: The Music of Ismael Rivera	Miguel Zenón	Latin jazz		
30	Un Gallo para la Historia	Tito Rojas	Salsa		J&N
30	Viva la Fiesta	Colegio de Música de Medellín	Children's		Merlín Studios Producciones

==== September ====
Day	Title	Artist	Genre(s)	Singles	Label
2	APKÁ!	Céu	Latin pop		Slap
4	Obatalá - uma Homenagem à Mãe Carmen	Grupo Ofá	Brazilian roots		Gege Produções Artísticas, Deck
6	Salto Al Color	Amaral	Pop rock		Sony Music Spain
6	Complicados	Blas Cantó	Pop	"Él No Soy Yo"	Universal Spain
6	Acaso Casa Ao Vivo	Almério and Mariene de Castro	Brazilian roots		Biscoito Fino
12	Little Electric Chicken Heart	Ana Frango Elétrico	Brazilian rock		Risco, Tratore
13	Amuza	Miki Núñez	Rumba	"Celébrate"	Universal Spain
13	Los Tigres del Norte at Folsom Prison	Los Tigres del Norte	Norteño		Fonovisa
13	Planeta Fome	Elza Soares	MPB		Deck
17	Mais Feliz	Zeca Pagodinho	Samba		Zeca Pagodiscos, Universal Music
20	Pero No Pasa Nada	Amaia	Indie pop	"El Relámpago"	Universal Spain
20	Labios Mentirosos	La Arrolladora Banda El Limón	Banda		Disa
25	La Metamorfosis	Reyli	Latin pop		Sony Music Mexico
27	Libertad 548	Pitbull	Reggaeton	"No Lo Trates" "3 to Tango" "Me Quedaré Contigo" "Get Ready "Mueve La Cintura"	Mr. 305, The Orchard
27	Pangea	Los Mesoneros	Pop rock		Los Mesoneros
27	Salud Por Nuestro 25 Aniversario	La Septima Banda	Banda		Brava Entertainment
29	Sublime	Alex Cuba	Singer-songwriter		Caracol

=== Fourth quarter ===
==== October ====
Day	Title	Artist	Genre(s)	Singles	Label
4	Per La Bona Gent	Manel	Alternative, indie	"Per La Bona Gent"	Ceràmiques Guzmán
4	Cabildo y Juramento	Conociendo Rusia	Pop rock		Geiser Discos
4	40 Años de Power	Puerto Rican Power	Salsa		Musical Productions
4	Caravana	Wos			
9	Unico	Amalfi	Latin Christian		Zionic Music
11	Que Quienes Somos	CNCO	Latin pop		Sony Music Latin
11	Profundo	Ministério Mergulhar	Latin Christian		Sony Music Brasil
11	O Amor no Caos, Vol. 2	Zeca Baleiro	MPB		Saravá Discos
13	The Academy	Sech and Dalex	Latin trap		Rich Music
17	Mala Santa	Becky G	Reggaeton, Latin hip hop	"Mayores" "Sin Pijama" "Cuando Te Besé" "Dollar" "Mala Santa"	Kemosabe; RCA; Sony Latin
18	Happy Birthday Flakko	Rels B	Pop rap	"La Latina"	Sony Music Spain
18	Kevin	Ferran Palau	Indie	"Univers"	Primavera Labels
18	Fuego	Estopa	Rumba	"Fuego"	Sony Music
21	Autêntica	Margareth Menezes	Brazilian roots		Estrela do Mar
25	Épico	Lunay	Reggaeton, Latin trap, dancehall	"A Solas" (remix) "Soltera" "Soltera" (remix) "La Cama" "Aventura"	Star Island
25	Quimera	Alba Reche	Synth-pop	"Medusa"	Universal Music Spain
25	Dame 10:36 Minutos	Ginebras	Bubblegum rock	"Todas Mis Ex Tienen Novio"	Independent
25	Prisma	Beret	Latin pop		Warner Music Spain
25	Plays Daniel Figueiredo	Leo Amuedo	Instrumental		MJC Music
28	Fraternidade-Terror	Cidade Dormitório	Experimental rock, psychedelic rock, post-punk, MPB		Banana Records
30	Origen y Esencia	Jesús Adrián Romero	Latin Christian		Vastago Producciones
30	AmarElo	Emicida	Latin alternative		Laboratório Fantasma
31	Corridos Tumbados	Natanael Cano	Latin trap		Rancho Humilde

==== November ====
Day	Title	Artist	Genre(s)	Singles	Label
1	1016: El Círculo Rojo	Alfred García	Pop rock	"Amar Volar al Invierno"	Universal Music Spain
1	Íntimo	Nicky Jam	Reggaeton	"X" "Te Robaré" "Atrévete" "Whine Up"	Sony Music Latin
1	Sobrevolando	Cultura Profética	Latin alternative		La Mafafa Discos
1	Sicalipsis	Maldy	Reggaeton	"Orden De Cateo" "Millonary"	MPB Records, GLAD Empire
4	Llegó Navidad	Los Lobos	Christmas		Rhino Entertainment
5	Catarse: Lado A	Daniela Araújo	Latin Christian		ONErpm
8	Seremos Primavera	Eruca Sativa	Rock en español		Sony Music Argentina
8	Dale Play	Kvrass	Vallenato		Codiscos
8	Bloco Na Rua (Deluxe)	Ney Matogrosso	MPB		Matogrosso, Som Livre
9	Los Cumbia Stars (Vol. )	Los Cumbia Stars	Cumbia		Discos Fuentes
9	N	Anavitória	Latin pop		Universal Music International
12	King Mangoberry: Music of Ricardo Lorenz	Michigan State University Wind Symphony, Manuel Alejandro Rangel, Maracas and Kevin L. Sedatole,	Classical		Blue Griffin
13	Shakira in Concert: El Dorado World Tour	Shakira	Latin pop	"Chantaje (El Dorado World Tour Live)"	Sony Music Latin
15	Renaissance	Mónica Naranjo	Pop		Missis Orange
15	Dimen5ión	La Goony Chonga	Trap pop		La Vendición
15	Aqui Está-se Sossegado	Camané and Mário Laginha	Fado		Warner Music Portugal
22	Mirándote a los ojos	José Luis Perales	Latin pop		Warner Music Spain
22	Por El Mundo Entero	Binomio de Oro de América	Vallenato		Codiscos
22	Al Rey José Alfredo Jiménez	Banda Lirio	Banda		Luz
22	Toño García: El Último Cacique	Los Gaiteros de San Jacinto	Folk		Llorona
29	Sensaciones	Sen Senra	Indie	"Ya No Hace Falta"	Universal Spain
29	Nibiru	Ozuna	reggaeton	"Baila Baila Baila" "Amor Genuino" "Te Soñé de Nuevo" "Hasta Que Salga el Sol" "Fantasía" "Nibiru"	Aura Music, Sony Latin
29	Tiempos de Aguinaldo	Various artists	Christmas, tropical		Banco
29	Los Conquistadores	Grupo Manía	Merengue		Mania Music

==== December ====
Day	Title	Artist	Genre(s)	Singles	Label
3	Cartografias	Caetano Brasil & Grupo	Instrumental		Caetano Brasil & Grupo
6	Mangueira - a Menina Dos Meus Olhos	Maria Bethânia	Samba		Quitanda, Biscoito Fino
6	Livre (Ao Vivo / Vol.1)	Lauana Prado	Música sertaneja		Universal Music International
6	Veia Nordestina	Mariana Aydar	Brazilian roots		Brisa
13	Pisteando Con la Regida	Fuerza Regida	Corridos		Rancho Humilde
19	Maria Passa à Frente	Marcelo Rossi	Latin Christian		Sony Music Brasil
20	Historias de un Capricornio	Arcángel	Reggaeton		Rimas

=== Dates unknown ===
Title	Artist	Genre(s)	Singles	Label
Lluvias de Bendicion	Gabriela Soto	Latin Christian		Gps
Traigo Esta Trulla: Las Grandes Parrandas del Milenio, Vol 15	Herminio de Jesus	Christmas, tropical		

== Year-End ==
=== Performance in the United States ===
==== Albums ====
The following is a list of the 10 best-performing Latin albums in the United States in the tracking period of November 24, 2018 through November 16, 2019, according to Billboard and Nielsen SoundScan, which compiles data from traditional sales and album-equivalent units. Equivalent album units are based on album sales, track equivalent albums (10 tracks sold equals one album sale), and streaming equivalent albums (3,750 ad-supported streams or 1,250 paid subscription streams equals one album sale).

Rank	Album	Artist
1	X 100pre	Bad Bunny
2	Aura	Ozuna
3	Ozuna	Ozuna
4	Real Hasta La Muerte	Anuel AA
5	Oasis	J Balvin and Bad Bunny
6	Vida	Luis Fonsi
7	Vibras	J Balvin
8	Todavía Me Amas: Lo Mejor De Aventura	Aventura
9	Sueños	Sech
10	Gangalee	Farruko

==== Songs ====
The following is a list of the 10 best-performing Latin songs in the United States in the tracking period of November 24, 2018 through November 16, 2019, according to Billboard and Nielsen SoundScan, which compiles data from streaming activity, digital sales and radio airplay.

Rank	Single	Artist
1	"Mía"	Bad Bunny featuring Drake
2	"Taki Taki"	DJ Snake featuring Selena Gomez, Ozuna and Cardi B
3	"Con Calma"	Daddy Yankee and Katy Perry featuring Snow
4	"Calma"	Pedro Capó and Farruko
5	"Ella Quiere Beber"	Anuel AA and Romeo Santos
6	"Otro Trago"	Sech featuring Darell, Nicky Jam, Ozuna and Anuel AA
7	"Callaíta"	Bad Bunny and Tainy
8	"Soltera"	Lunay, Daddy Yankee and Bad Bunny
9	"No Me Conoce"	Jhay Cortez, J Balvin and Bad Bunny
10	"Te Boté"	Casper Mágico, Nio García, Darell, Nicky Jam, Ozuna, and Bad Bunny

=== Airplay in Latin America ===
The following is a list of the 10 most-played radio songs in Latin America in the tracking period of December 17, 2018 through December 1, 2019, according to Monitor Latino.

Rank	Single	Artist	Spins
1	"Con Calma"	Daddy Yankee featuring Snow	462,880
2	"Calma"	Pedro Capó and Farruko	435,260
3	"Otro Trago"	Sech featuring Darell	254,160
4	"Un Año"	Sebastián Yatra featuring Reik	242,210
5	"Mía"	Bad Bunny featuring Drake	235,300
6	"Soltera"	Lunay featuring Daddy Yankee and Bad Bunny	234,200
7	"A Través del Vaso"	Banda Los Sebastianes	225,330
8	"Taki Taki"	DJ Snake featuring Selena Gomez, Ozuna, and Cardi B	223,640
9	"Te Vi"	Piso 21 featuring Micro TDH	219,840
10	"Con Altura"	Rosalía featuring J Balvin and El Guincho	214,320

==== By country ====
The following is a list of the most-played radio songs in Latin America in the tracking period of December 17, 2018 through December 1, 2019 by country, according to Monitor Latino.

Country	Single	Artist	Spins	Ref.
Argentina	"Calma"	Pedro Capó and Farruko	19,980	
Bolivia	"Con Calma"	Daddy Yankee featuring Snow	5,240	
Chile	"Calma"	Pedro Capó and Farruko	20,500	
Colombia	"Calma"	Pedro Capó and Farruko	37,530	
Costa Rica	"Calma"	Pedro Capó and Farruko	13,440	
Dominican Republic	"Desilusion"	Ely Holguin	40,910	
Ecuador	"Con Calma"	Daddy Yankee featuring Snow	17,720	
El Salvador	"Calma"	Pedro Capó and Farruko	8,960	
Guatemala	"Con Calma"	Daddy Yankee featuring Snow	11,300	
Honduras	"Con Calma"	Daddy Yankee featuring Snow	10,650	
Mexico	"Con Calma"	Daddy Yankee featuring Snow	75,160	
Nicaragua	"Con Calma"	Daddy Yankee featuring Snow	4,850	
Panama	"Con Calma"	Daddy Yankee featuring Snow	11,870	
Paraguay	"Con Calma"	Daddy Yankee featuring Snow	5,750	
Peru	"Con Calma"	Daddy Yankee featuring Snow	11,530	
Puerto Rico	"Con Calma"	Daddy Yankee featuring Snow	7,740	
Uruguay	"Pasarela"	Juan & Rafa featuring Lucía	4,790	
Venezuela	"Calma"	Pedro Capó and Farruko	14,130	

==== By artist ====
The following is a list of the five most-played artists in Latin America among the top 100 songs from the tracking period of December 17, 2018 through December 1, 2019, according to Monitor Latino.

Rank	Artist	Spins	Songs
1	Ozuna	1,380,660	9
2	Daddy Yankee	1,304,210	6
3	J Balvin	1,281,850	8
4	Bad Bunny	1,068,150	6
5	Maluma	946,880	6

=== Performance in non-Spanish-speaking countries ===
The following is a list of the best-performing Latin songs in non-Spanish-speaking countries in 2019 by nation.

Country	Single	Artist	Rank	Ref.
Belgium (Flanders)	"Con Calma"	Daddy Yankee featuring Snow	13	
Belgium (Wallonia)	"Con Calma"	Daddy Yankee featuring Snow	12	
Canada	"Con Calma"	Daddy Yankee and Katy Perry featuring Snow	27	
Germany	"Con Calma"	Daddy Yankee featuring Snow	11	
United States	"Mía"	Bad Bunny featuring Drake	44	

== Deaths ==
- January 10 – Kevin Fret, 25, Puerto Rican musician, shot.
- January 13 – Rafael Viera, 90, Salsa promoter and record store owner
- January 16 – Rita Vidaurri, 94, American singer.
- January 21 – Ulises Butrón, 56, Argentinian musician, singer, and music producer
- January 25 – Roberto Livi, 76, Argentine musician and composer
- January 28 – Yoskar Sarante, 48, Dominican Republic bachata singer (complications from lung disease)
- January 31 – Jorge Casas, 69, Cuban American bassist for the Miami Sound Machine
- February 7 – Legarda, 29, Colombian reggaeton musician (shot)
- February 10 – Juanjo Domínguez, 67, Argentine musician
- February 13 – Bibi Ferreira, 96, Brazilian actress (Leonora of the Seven Seas, The End of the River) and singer.
- February 21 – Sequeira Costa, 89, Portuguese pianist, cancer.
- February 24 – Marcos Antonio Urbay, 90, Cuban musician
- February 26 – Tavito, 71, Brazilian musician, composer and record producer (oral cancer)
- March 4 – Anthony Ríos, 68, Dominican actor and singer-songwriter, heart attack.
- March 11 – Demétrius, 76, Brazilian singer
- April 1 – Armando Vega Gil, Mexican bassist for Botellita de Jerez
- April 4
  - Alberto Cortez, 79, Argentine singer and songwriter (gastric haemorrhage)
  - Joe Quijano, 83, Puerto Rican salsa musician
- April 5 – Pastor López, 74, Venezuelan singer-songwriter
- April 19 – Julio Melgar, Guatemalan Christian singer, cancer
- April 22 – Dave Samuels, 70, American percussionist (Spyro Gyra).
- April 30 – Beth Carvalho, 72, Brazilian samba singer
- May 2 – Juan Vicente Torrealba, 102, Venezuelan harpist and composer.
- May 4 – Eva de la O, Puerto Rican soprano
- May 27 – Gabriel Diniz, 28, Brazilian singer and composer, plane crash.
- June 7 – Serguei, 85, Brazilian singer
- June 8 – Andre Matos, 47, Brazilian singer (heart attack)
- June 13 – André Midani, 86, Brazilian record executive
- June 22 – Paulo Pagni, 61, Brazilian drummer (RPM), pulmonary fibrosis.
- June 27 – Gualberto Castro, 84, Mexican singer (Los Hermanos Castro) and television personality (La Carabina de Ambrosio), complications from bladder cancer.
- July 6 – João Gilberto, 88, Brazilian singer-songwriter and guitarist, pioneer of bossa nova music style.
- July 23 – Pablo Dueñas, 60, Mexican radio executive and musicologist
- August 19 – Paco Navaroo, 82, Puerto Rican salsa radio DJ
- August 21 – Celso Piña, 66, Mexican cumbia singer, composer and accordionist, heart attack.
- September 4 – Elton Medeiros, 89, Brazilian MPB and samba singer, pneumonia.
- September 8 – Camilo Sesto, 72, Spanish singer-songwriter ("Algo Más", "Amor Mío, ¿Qué Me Has Hecho?"), heart failure.
- September 14 – Alicia Maguiña, 81, Peruvian singer and composer.
- September 15 – Roberto Leal, 67, Portuguese-Brazilian singer, skin cancer.
- September 19 – María Rivas, 59, Venezuelan Latin jazz singer, composer and painter, cancer.
- September 28 – José José, 71, Mexican singer ("El Triste", "Como Tú") and actor (Gavilán o Paloma), pancreatic cancer.
- October 15 – Cacho Castaña, 77, Argentine singer and actor (Los Hijos de López, Merry Christmas), lung disease.
- October 17 – Ray Santos, 90, American saxophonist and composer.
- October 24 – Walter Franco, 74, Brazilian singer and composer
- November 19 – José Mário Branco, 77, Portuguese singer-songwriter, actor and record producer.
- November 22 – Gugu Liberato, 60, Brazilian singer and television presenter (injuries from fall)
- November 28 – Juninho Berin Brazilian singer and composer
- December 19 – Patxi Andión, 72, Spanish singer-songwriter, musician and actor (The Compass Rose), traffic collision.
- December 22 – Ubirajara Penacho dos Reis, 85, Brazilian musician (Programa do Jô), stroke.
- December 28 – Amy Patterson, 107, Argentine composer, singer and poet.
- December 29 – Arlindo Júnior, 51, Brazilian singer
