= Famouz =

2019 studio album by Jhayco

Studio album by Jhayco
- Released: May 24, 2019
- Recorded: 2018–2019
- Genre: Reggaeton; Latin trap; electropop
- Length: 50:55
- Language: Spanish
- Label: Universal Latino
- Producer: Sky Rompiendo; Tainy; E.T.F. Exel the Future; Mvsis; Taiko; Ammunation; Erick Ant; Misael de la Cruz; Haze; Jhayco

Jhayco chronology
Famouz (2019)	Timelezz (2021)

Singles from Famouz
- 1. "Costear" Released: October 31, 2018; 2. "No Me Conoce" Released: February 22, 2019; 3. "Deséame Suerte" Released: August 30, 2019; 4. "Easy" Released: November 19, 2019

Famouz is the debut studio album by Puerto Rican rapper Jhayco, released on May 24, 2019, through Universal Music Latino. It was produced by Sky Rompiendo, Tainy, E.T.F. Exel the Future, Mvsis, Taiko, Ammunation, Erick Ant, Misael de la Cruz, Haze and Jhayco himself, and features collaborations with J Balvin, Bad Bunny, Rafa Pabón, Almighty, Tainy, C. Tangana and Zion & Lennox. A special edition of the album titled Famouz Reloaded was released on January 24, 2020, featuring collaborations with Karol G, Haze, Wisin & Yandel, Ozuna and Myke Towers.

The album peaked at numbers 5 and 165 at the US Billboard 200 and Top Latin Albums charts, respectively. Additionally, it was certified platinum in United States in 2020.

== Background ==
On August 22, 2017, Cortez signed with the label Universal Music Latino under the House of Haze movement in alliance with the producer Fino como el Haze, who also produced his first single "Donde No Se Vea", released later in the year. The following year, Cortez worked on the composition of various songs such as Yandel's "Mi Religión", Daddy Yankee's "Otra Cosa" and the collaboration "Criminal" by Natti Natasha and Ozuna. Prior to the released of Famouz, Cortez released the nine-track EP Eyez On Me on May 18, 2018.

A special edition of the album was released on January 24, 2020 as Famouz Reloaded composed of the songs from Famouz alongside five additional songs, two being original songs, "Déseame Suerte" with Karol G and Haze, and "Como Se Siente", and three being remixes of songs previously featured in the original album, "Imaginaste" with Wisin & Yandel, "Easy" with Ozuna and "Subiendo de Nivel" featuring Myke Towers.

== Singles ==
The first single for the album was "Costear", with Cuban rapper Almighty, released on October 31, 2018. The second singles was "No Me Conoce", released on February 22, 2019, a remix of the song with Bad Bunny and J Balvin was released later in 2019. The remix was commercially successful, peaking at number 4 and 71 at the Hot Latin Songs and Billboard Hot 100 charts, respectively, being Cortez first appearance on both charts.

To promote the release of Famouz Reloaded, two singles were released, "Deséame Suerte" with Karol G and Haze on August 30, 2019, and the remix of "Easy" with Ozuna on November 19, 2019. Both "Costear" and "Deséame Suerte" were certified gold in United States while the remix of "No Me Conoce" was certified platinum selling over a million of copies by 2020.

== Critical reception ==
American magazine Rolling Stone included the album in their list of Best Latin Albums of 2019, placing it at number four, writing that "while the music landscape is littered with the bodies of hit-writers who have attempted to transition to solo stardom, Cortez made the switch look easy this year", they also commented that the album was "tenacious and hummable throughout, incorporating bracing production from Tainy (on the imperious "Imaginaste") and Taiko ("Easy")".

=== Accolades ===
Accolades for Famouz
Publication	Accolade	Rank
Rolling Stone	Best Latin Album of 2019	4

== Track listing ==
Famouz track listing
No.	Title	Writer(s)	Producer(s)	Length
1.	"Subiendo de Nivel"	Jesús Manuel Nieves Cortés; Luis Rangel; Nydia Yera; Roberto Castro	E.T.F. Exel the Future	4:02
2.	"No Me Conoce (remix)" (with J Balvin and Bad Bunny)	Nieves Cortés; Yera; Benito Antonio Martínez Ocasio; José Alvaro Osorio Balvin; Michael Masís; Misael de la Cruz Reynoso	Mvsis	5:09
3.	"Easy"	Nieves Cortés; Yera; Alejandro Ramírez Suárez; Nicolás I. Jaña Gallegillos	Taiko	3:59
4.	"Cuando Bebe" (with Rafa Pabón)	Nieves Cortés; Yera; Ramírez Suárez; Rafael Pabon Navedo	Sky Rompiendo	4:13
5.	"En la Mía"	Nieves Cortés; Yera; Ramírez Suárez	Sky Rompiendo	3:54
6.	"Sabe"	Nieves Cortés; Yera; Ramírez Suárez	Sky Rompiendo	3:33
7.	"Costear" (with Almighty)	Nieves Cortés; Yera; Alejandro Mosqueda Paz; Elvin J. Roubert Rodriguez; Sergio L. Roldan Figueroa	Ammunation	3:59
8.	"Imaginaste" (with Tainy)	Nieves Cortés; Yera; Marco Masís	Tainy	3:18
9.	"Apaga las Luces"	Nieves Cortés; Yera; Ramírez Suárez	Sky Rompiendo	3:37
10.	"¿Cuánto Es?" (with C. Tangana)	Nieves Cortés; Roubert Rodriguez; Roldan Figueroa; Antón Álvarez Alfaro; Nydia Laner	Ammunation; Erick Ant	3:07
11.	"Tocarte"	Nieves Cortés; Yera; Roubert Rodriguez; Roldan Figueroa	Ammunation	4:02
12.	"Somos Iguales" (with Zion & Lennox)	Nieves Cortés; Yera; Ramírez Suárez; Felix G. Ortiz Torres; Gabriel E. Pizarro	Sky Rompiendo	3:56
13.	"No Me Conoce"	Nieves Cortés; Yera; Masís; De la Cruz Reynoso	Mvsis; Misael de la Cruz	4:00
Total length:				50:55

Famouz Reloaded track listing
No.	Title	Writer(s)	Producer(s)	Length
14.	"Deséame Suerte" (with Karol G and Haze)	Nieves Cortés; Yera; Carolina Giraldo Navarro; Egbert Rosa; Julio Ramirez Egia; Alejandra Ruiz Ocampo	Haze	3:28
15.	"Imaginaste (remix)" (with Wisin & Yandel)	Nieves Cortés; Yera; Masís; Rosa; Juan Luis Morera Luna; Llandel Veguilla Malavé	Tainy	4:06
16.	"Easy (remix)" (with Ozuna)	Nieves Cortés; Yera; Ramírez Suárez; Jaña Gallegillos; Juan Carlos Ozuna Rosado	Taiko; Jhayco	4:06
17.	"Subiendo de Nivel (remix)" (featuring Myke Towers)	Nieves Cortés; Laner; Rangel; Castro; Ervin Quiroz; Michael Monge	E.T.F. Exel the Future; Jhayco	4:09
18.	"Como Se Siente"	Nieves Cortés; Laner; Roubert Rodriguez; Roldan Figueroa; Masís	Ammunation; Tainy	3:39
Total length:				69:51

== Charts ==
Weekly chart performance for Famouz
Chart (2019)	Peak position
US Billboard 200	164
US Top Latin Albums (Billboard)	5
US Latin Rhythm Albums (Billboard)	4

== Certifications ==
Certifications for Famouz
Region	Certification	Certified units/sales
United States (RIAA)	3× Platinum (Latin)	180,000^{‡}
^{‡} Sales+streaming figures based on certification alone.
