= 20th Annual Latin Grammy Awards =

Music awards presented Nov 2019

20th Latin Grammy Awards
- Date: November 14, 2019
- Venue: MGM Grand Garden Arena, Paradise, Nevada
- Hosted by: Ricky Martin, Roselyn Sánchez and Paz Vega; Lali (pre-telecast ceremony)

Highlights
- Most awards: Rosalía, Alejandro Sanz and El Guincho (3 each)
- Person of the Year: Juanes

Television/radio coverage
- Network: Univision

The 20th Annual Latin Grammy Awards were held on Thursday, November 14, 2019, at the MGM Grand Garden Arena in Las Vegas and was broadcast on Univision. The telecast marked the 20th anniversary of the Latin Grammy Awards and honored outstanding achievements in Latin music released from June 1, 2018, to May 31, 2019.

Juanes was honored as the Latin Recording Academy Person of the Year on the night prior to the telecast. Thalía was honored with the President's Merit Award for her achievements and outstanding contribution in Latin music.

Nominations were announced on September 24, 2019. Spanish singer-songwriter Alejandro Sanz led nominations with eight. Rosalía and Alejandro Sanz had the most wins with three awards each.

== Performers ==
- Anitta, Milly Quezada, Tony Succar and Olga Tañón — "La Vida Es Un Carnaval"
- Carlos Rivera, Leonel García and Reik — "Querida"
- Calibre 50, Natalia Jiménez and Prince Royce — "Secreto de Amor"
- Beto Cuevas, Fito Páez and Draco Rosa — "De Música Ligera"
- Paula Arenas — "Ahora Soy Libre"
- Sech, Darell and Ozuna — "Otro Trago" / "Si Te Vas"
- Intocable — "No Van A Entender"
- Alejandro Sanz, Aitana, Greeicy and Nella — "Mi Persona Favorita"
- Rosalía — "A Palé" / "Con Altura"
- Alex Fernández, Alejandro Fernández and Vicente Fernández — "Volver, Volver"
- Fonseca — "Perdóname"
- Alicia Keys, Miguel, Pedro Capó and Farruko — "Show Me Love" / "Calma"
- Juanes — "Fíjate Bien" / "Querer Mejor" (with Alessia Cara) / "A Dios le Pido" / "Bonita" (with Sebastián Yatra) / "La Camisa Negra" 10:52
- Luis Fonsi — "Aquí Estoy Yo" / "Imposible"
- Pepe Aguilar — "El Triste Tribute to Jose Jose"
- Ricky Martin, Residente and Bad Bunny — "Cántalo"
- Ozuna — "Amor Genuino" / "Hasta Que Salga El Sol"
- Ximena Sariñana and Los Ángeles Azules — "Cobarde" / "Mis Sentimientos"
- Sebastián Yatra and Reik — "Un Año"
- Bad Bunny — "Callaita"

== Winners and Nominees ==
The following is the list of nominees. Winners are highlighted in bold.

=== General ===
Record of the Year

Alejandro Sanz and Camila Cabello — "Mi Persona Favorita"

Alfonso Pérez, Julio Reyes Copello & Alejandro Sanz, record producers; Nicolás De La Espriella, Carlos Fernando López, Alfonso Pérez, Natalia Ramírez, Nicolás Ramírez & Julio Reyes Copello, recording engineers; Trevor Lyle Muzzy, mixer; Gene Grimaldi, mastering engineer

- Marc Anthony — "Parecen Viernes"
  - Marc Anthony & Sergio George, record producers; Carlos Álvarez, Juan Mario Aracil "Mayito", Natalia Ramírez & Julio Reyes Copello, recording engineers; Carlos Álvarez & Juan Mario Aracil "Mayito", mixers; Adam Ayan & Michael Fuller, mastering engineers
- Andrés Calamaro — "Verdades Afiladas"
  - Gustavo Borner, record producer; Gustavo Borner, recording engineer; Gustavo Borner, mixer; Eric Boulanger, mastering engineer
- Vicente García — "Ahí Ahí"
  - Eduardo Cabra & Vicente García, record producers; José Victor Olivier, Daniel Sanint & Harold Wendell Sanders, recording engineers; Fab Dupont, mixer; Diego Calviño, mastering engineer
- Juan Luis Guerra y 4.40 — "Kitipun"
  - Juan Luis Guerra & Janina Rosado, record producers; Allan Leschhorn & Simon Rhodes, recording engineers; Allan Leschhorn, mixer; Adam Ayan, mastering engineer
- Juanes and Alessia Cara — "Querer Mejor"
  - Rafa Arcaute, Juanes & Tainy, producers; Alejandro Patiño & Orlando Vitto, recording engineers; Jaycen Joshua, mixer; Dave Kutch, mastering engineer
- Juanes and Lalo Ebratt — "La Plata"
  - Mauricio Rengifo & Andrés Torres, record producers; Mauricio Rengifo & Andrés Torres, recording engineers; Jaycen Joshua, mixer; Dave Kutch, mastering engineer
- Rosalía — "Aute Cuture"
  - El Guincho & Rosalía, record producers; El Guincho, recording engineer; Jaycen Joshua, mixer; Chris Athens, mastering engineer
- Alejandro Sanz — "No Tengo Nada"
  - Alfonso Pérez, Julio Reyes Copello & Alejandro Sanz, record producers; Nicolás De La Espriella, Carlos Fernando López, Alfonso Pérez, Natalia Ramírez, Nicolás Ramírez & Julio Reyes Copello, recording engineers; Trevor Lyle Muzzy, mixer; Gene Grimaldi, mastering engineer
- Ximena Sariñana — "Cobarde"
  - Mauricio Rengifo & Andrés Torres, record producers; Mauricio Rengifo & Andrés Torres, recording engineers; Jaycen Joshua, mixer; Dave Kutch, mastering engineer

Album of the Year

Rosalía — El Mal Querer

El Guincho & Rosalía, album producers; El Guincho, album recording engineer; Jaycen Joshua, album mixer; Antón Álvarez Alfaro, El Guincho & Rosalía, songwriters; Chris Athens, album mastering engineer

- Paula Arenas — Visceral
  - Julio Reyes Copello, album producer; Nicolás de la Espriella, Carlos Fernando López, Ricardo López Lalinde, Natalia Ramírez & Julio Reyes Copello, album recording engineers; Nicolás Ramírez, album mixer; Paula Arenas & Julio Reyes Copello, songwriters; Antonio Baglio & Robin Reumers, album mastering engineers
- Rubén Blades — Paraíso Road Gang
  - Luis Enrique Becerra & Rubén Blades, album producers; Luis Enrique Becerra & José Ramón Guerra, album recording engineers; Luis Enrique Becerra & Rubén Blades, album mixers; Rubén Blades, songwriter; Geoff Pesche, album mastering engineer
- Andrés Calamaro — Cargar la Suerte
  - Gustavo Borner, album producer; Gustavo Borner, album recording engineer; Gustavo Borner, album mixer; Andrés Calamaro & German Wiedemer, songwriters; Gustavo Borner, album mastering engineer
- Fonseca — Agustín
  - Fonseca, album producer; Andrés Borda, album recording engineer; Iker Gastaminza & Trevor Lyle Muzzy, album mixers; Fonseca, songwriter; Dave Kutch, album mastering engineer
- Luis Fonsi — Vida
  - Mauricio Rengifo & Andrés Torres, album producers; Luis Fonsi, Mauricio Rengifo & Andrés Torres, album recording engineers; Jaycen Joshua, album mixer; Luis Fonsi, Mauricio Rengifo & Andrés Torres, songwriters; Dave Kutch, album mastering engineer
- Alejandro Sanz — #ElDisco
  - Alfonso Pérez, Julio Reyes Copello & Alejandro Sanz, album producers; Nicolás De La Espriella, Carlos Fernando Lopez, Alfonso Pérez, Natalia Ramírez, Nicolás Ramírez & Julio Reyes Copello, album recording engineers; Trevor Lyle Muzzy, album mixer; Alejandro Sanz, songwriter; Gene Grimaldi, album mastering engineer
- Ximena Sariñana — ¿Dónde Bailarán las Niñas?
  - Juan Pablo Vega, album producer; Daniel Bitrán Arizpe, album recording engineer; Alejandro Patiño, album mixer; Ximena Sariñana & Juan Pablo Vega, songwriters; Alejandro Patiño, album mastering engineer
- Tony Succar — Más de Mi
  - Marc Quiñones & Tony Succar, album producers; Santiago Diaz, Nestor Rigaud & Tony Succar, album recording engineers; Alfredo Matheus, album mixer; Jorge Luis Piloto & Tony Succar, songwriters; Michael Fuller, album mastering engineer
- Sebastián Yatra — Fantasía
  - Mauricio Rengifo & Andrés Torres, album producers; Nicolas Ladrón De Guevara, Mauricio Rengifo & Andrés Torres, album recording engineers; Jaycen Joshua, album mixer; Mauricio Rengifo, Andrés Torres & Sebastián Yatra, songwriters; Dave Kutch, album mastering engineer

Song of the Year

"Calma" — Pedro Capó, Gabriel Edgar González Pérez & George Noriega, songwriters (Pedro Capó)

- "Desconstrução" — Tiago Iorc, songwriter (Tiago Iorc)
- "El País" — Rubén Blades, songwriter (Rubén Blades)
- "Kitipun" — Juan Luis Guerra, songwriter (Juan Luis Guerra 4.40)
- "Mi Persona Favorita" — Camila Cabello and Alejandro Sanz, songwriters (Alejandro Sanz and Camila Cabello)
- "No Tengo Nada" — Alejandro Sanz, songwriter (Alejandro Sanz)
- "Quédate" — Kany García and Tommy Torres, songwriters (Kany García and Tommy Torres)
- "Querer Mejor" — Rafael Arcaute, Alessia Cara, Camilo Echeverry, Juanes, Mauricio Montaner, Ricardo Montaner and Tainy, songwriters (Juanes and Alessia Cara)
- "Un Año" — Mauricio Rengifo, Andrés Torres and Sebastián Yatra, songwriters (Sebastián Yatra Featuring Reik)
- "Ven" — Fonseca, songwriter (Fonseca)

Best New Artist

Nella

- Aitana
- Burning Caravan
- Cami
- Fer Casillas
- Chipi Chacón
- Elsa y Elmar
- Greeicy
- Juan Ingaramo
- Paulo Londra

=== Pop ===
Best Contemporary Pop Vocal Album

Rosalía — El Mal Querer

- Ricardo Montaner — Montaner
- Morat — Balas Perdidas
- Alejandro Sanz — #ElDisco
- Sebastián Yatra — Fantasía

Best Traditional Pop Vocal Album

Fonseca — Agustín

- Paula Arenas — Visceral
- Cami — Rosa
- Camila — Hacia Adentro
- Pavel Núñez — Sentimientos

Best Pop Song

"Mi Persona Favorita" — Alejandro Sanz and Camila Cabello, songwriters (Alejandro Sanz and Camila Cabello)

- "Bailar" — Leonel García, songwriter (Leonel García)
- "Buena Para Nada" — Paula Arenas, Luigi Castillo and Santiago Castillo, songwriters (Paula Arenas)
- "Pienso en tu Mirá" — Antón Álvarez Alfaro, El Guincho and Rosalía, songwriters (Rosalía)
- "Ven" — Fonseca, songwriter (Fonseca)

=== Urban ===
Best Urban Fusion/Performance

Pedro Capó and Farruko — "Calma (Remix)"

- Bad Bunny — "Tenemos Que Hablar"
- ChocQuibtown, Zion & Lennox, Farruko featuring Manuel Turizo — "Pa' Olvidarte"
- Daddy Yankee featuring Snow — "Con Calma"
- Sech featuring Darell — "Otro Trago"

Best Urban Music Album

Bad Bunny — X 100pre

- Anitta — Kisses
- De La Ghetto — Mi Movimiento
- Feid — 19
- Sech — Sueños

Best Urban Song

"Con Altura" — J Balvin, Mariachi Budda, Frank Dukes, Teo Halm, El Guincho, Alejandro Ramirez and Rosalía, songwriters (Rosalía and J Balvin featuring El Guincho)

- "Baila Baila Baila" — Ozuna and Vicente Saavedra, songwriters (Ozuna)
- "Caliente" — J Balvin, Rene Cano, De La Ghetto and Alejandro Ramirez, songwriters (De La Ghetto featuring J Balvin
- "Otro Trago" — Kevyn Mauricio Cruz, Kevin Mauricio Jimenez Londoño, Bryan Lezcano Chaverra, Josh Mendez, Sech and Jorge Valdes, songwriters (Sech featuring Darell)
- "Pa' Olvidarte" — René Cano, ChocQuibtown, Kevyn Cruz Moreno, Juan Diego Medina Vélez, Andrés David Restrepo, Mateo Tejada Giraldo, Andrés Uribe Marín, Juan Vargas & Doumbia Yohann, songwriters (ChocQuibtown)

=== Rock ===
Best Rock Album

Draco Rosa — Monte Sagrado

- A.N.I.M.A.L — Una Razon Para Seguir
- Arawato — Arawato
- Carajo — Basado en hechos reales
- Molotov — MTV Unplugged: El Desconecte

Best Pop/Rock Album

Andrés Calamaro — Cargar la Suerte

- Jumbo — Manual de Viaje A Un Lugar Lejano
- David Lebón — Lebón & Co.
- Leiva — Nuclear
- Taburete — Madam Ayahuasca

Best Rock Song

"Verdades Afiladas" — Andrés Calamaro and German Wiedemer, songwriters (Andrés Calamaro)

- "Conectar" — Rodrigo Crespo, songwriter (Rodrigo Crespo)
- "Gozilla" — Leiva, songwriter (Leiva featuring Enrique Bunbury and Ximena Sariñana)
- "Nirvana" — Arawato, songwriters (Arawato)
- "Punta Cana" — Roberto Musso, songwriter (El Cuarteto de Nos)

=== Alternative ===
Best Alternative Music Album

Mon Laferte — Norma

- Alex Anwandter — Latinoamericana
- Babasónicos — Discutible
- Bandalos Chinos — Bach
- Marilina Bertoldi — Prender Un Fuego

Best Alternative Song

"Tócamela" — David Julca, Jonathan Julca, Los Amigos Invisibles, Silverio Lozada and Servando Primera, songwriters (Los Amigos Invisibles)

- "Causa Perdida" — El David Aguilar, songwriter (El David Aguilar)
- "Contra Todo" — Ismael Cancel and ILE, songwriters (ILE)
- "Cuentas Claras" — Kevin Johansen, songwriter (Kevin Johansen)
- "La Pregunta" — Adrián Dárgelos Rodríguez, songwriter (Babasónicos)

=== Tropical ===
Best Salsa Album

Tony Succar — Mas De Mi

- Maite Hontelé — Cuba Linda
- Mario Ortiz All Star Band — 55 Aniversario
- Eddie Palmieri — Mi Luz Mayor
- Quintero's Salsa Project — Nuestro Hogar

Best Cumbia/Vallenato Album

Puerto Candelaria and Juancho Valencia — Yo Me Llamo Cumbia

- Checo Acosta — Checo Acosta 30 (Live)
- Diego Daza y Carlos Rueda — Esto Que Dice!
- Juan Piña — Para Mis Maestros Con Respeto
- Various Artists — Raíces

Best Traditional Tropical Album

Andrés Cepeda — Andrés Cepeda Big Band (Live)

- Olga Cerpa y Mestisay — Vereda Tropical
- Yelsy Heredia — Lo Nuestro
- Aymée Nuviola — A Journey Through Cuban Music
- Septeto Acarey — La Llave Del Son

Best Contemporany Tropical/Tropical Fusion Album

Juan Luis Guerra 4.40 — Literal

- Iván Barrios — Barrios De Mi Tierra (Rubén Blade's songs)
- Vicente García — Candela
- Ilegales — Tropicalia
- Milly Quezada — Milly & Company

Best Tropical Song

"Kitipun" — Juan Luis Guerra, songwriter (Juan Luis Guerra 4.40)

- "El Afortunado" — Luis Enrique and Jorge Luis Piloto, songwriters (Septeto Acarey featuring Luis Enrique)
- "Mas de Mi" — Jorge Luis Piloto and Tony Succar, songwriters (Tony Succar featuring Angel López)
- "Subiendo y Bajando" — Bobby Allende, Waddys Jáquez, David Maldonado and Adan Pérez, songwriters (8 y Más featuring Rubén Blades)
- "Vivir Es Complicado" — Jorge Luis Piloto, songwriters (Andrés Cepeda and Dayhan Díaz)

=== Songwriter ===
Best Singer-Songwriter Album

Kany García — Contra el Viento

- Albita — Acústica
- Leonel García — Amor Presente
- Kevin Johansen — Algo Ritmos
- Gian Marco — Intuición

=== Regional Mexican ===
Best Ranchero/Mariachi Album

Christian Nodal — Ahora

- El Bebeto — Mi Persona Preferida
- Alex Fernández — Sigue La Dinastía...
- Vicente Fernández — Más Romántico Que Nunca
- Flor De Toloache — Indestructible

Best Banda Album

Banda Los Sebastianes — A Través Del Vaso

- Saul El Jaguar Alarcón — Para Que No Te Lo Imagines
- El Mimoso — 25 Años Vol 1
- La Explosiva Banda De Maza — Un Tributo Al Sol
- Edwin Luna y La Trakalosa De Monterrey — Me Hiciste Un Borracho

Best Tejano Album

Elida Reyna y Avante — Colores

- El Plan — Siete
- Lucky Joe — Tu Príncipe
- David Lee Rodriquez — Así Me Enseñaron
- Vidal — Nunca Te Rindas

Best Norteño Album

Intocable — Percepción

- Bronco — Por Más
- Buyuchek — Las Canciones De La Abuela
- Calibre 50 — Mitad y Mitad
- La Maquinaria Norteña — Amo

Best Regional Song

"No Te Contaron Mal" — Edgar Barrera, Gussy Lau and Christian Nodal, songwriters (Christian Nodal)

- "Alguien Mejor Que Yo" — Jose Luis Roma, songwriter (Bronco)
- "Besos De Mezcal" — Shae Fiol, Camilo Lara and Mireya Ramos, songwriters (Flor De Toloache)
- "De Los Besos Que Te Di" — José Esparza and Gussy Lau, songwriters (Christian Nodal)
- "Te Amaré" — Manuel Monterrosas, songwriter (Alex Fernández)

=== Instrumental ===
Best Instrumental Album

Gustavo Casenave — Balance

- Cuban Sax Quintet — Saxofones Live Sessions
- Edu Ribeiro, Fábio Peron and Toninho Ferragutti — Folia De Treis
- Moisés P. Sánchez — Unbalanced Concerto For Ensemble
- Miguel Zenón featuring Spektral Quartet — Yo Soy La Tradición

=== Traditional ===
Best Folk Album

Luis Enrique + C4 Trio — Tiempo Al Tiempo

- Eva Ayllon — 48 Años Después
- Canalón de Timbiquí — De Mar y Río
- Cimarrón — Orinoco
- Luis Cobos Con The Royal Philharmonic Orchestra and El Mariachi Juvenil Tecalitlán — ¡Va Por México!

Best Tango Album

Quinteto Astor Piazzolla — Revolucionario

- Daniel Binelli y Nick Danielson — Marrón y Azul
- Enrique Campos — Roto
- Bernardo Monk — Atípico
- Pablo Ziegler Chamber Quartet — Radiotango

=== Jazz ===
Best Latin Jazz Album

Chucho Valdés — Jazz Batá 2

- Claudia Acuña — Turning Pages
- Branly, Ruiz & Haslip — Elemental
- Dos Orientales — Tercer Viaje
- André Marques — Rio - São Paulo

=== Christian ===
Best Christian Album (Spanish Language)

Juan Delgado — Todo Pasa

- Danilo Montero — Mi Viaje (Live)
- Gabriela Soto and Big Band — Lluvias De Bendición
- Ricardo Torres y Su Mariachi — Padre Mio
- Alex Zurdo — ¿Quién Contra Nosotros?

Best Christian Album (Portuguese Language)

Delino Marçal — Guarda Meu Coração

- Priscilla Alcântara — Gente
- Adriana Arydes — Sagrado
- Preto No Branco — Preto No Branco 3
- Eli Soares — 360º

=== Portuguese Language ===
Best Portuguese Language Contemporary Pop Album

Anavitória — O Tempo É Agora

- As Bahias e a Cozinha Mineira — Tarântula
- Ana Cañas — Todxs
- Mahmundi — Para Dias Ruins
- Jair Oliveira — Selfie

Best Portuguese Language Rock or Alternative Album

BaianaSystem — O Futuro Não Demora

- The Baggios — Vulcão
- Chal — O Céu Sobre A Cabeça
- Liniker e Os Caramelows — Goela Abaixo
- Pitty — Matriz

Best Samba/Pagode Album

Mart'nália — Mart'nália Canta Vinicius de Moraes

- Nego Álvaro — Canta Sereno E Moa
- Monarco — De Todos Os Tempos
- Péricles — Em Sua Direção
- Anaí Rosa — Anaí Rosa Atraca Geraldo Pereira

Best MPB Album

Gilberto Gil — Ok Ok Ok

- Zeca Baleiro — O Amor No Caos
- Nana Caymmi — Canta Tito Madi
- Zélia Duncan — Tudo é Um
- Delia Fischer — Tempo Mínimo
- Jards Macalé — Besta Fera

Best Sertaneja Music Album

Marília Mendonça — Em Todos os Cantos

- Paula Fernandes — Hora Certa
- Francis & Felipe — Francis & Felipe
- Luan Santana — Live Movel
- Mano Walter — Ao Vivo em São Paulo

Best Portuguese Language Roots Album

Hermeto Pascoal — Hermeto Pascoal E Sua Visão Original Do Forró

- Foli Griô Orquestra — Ajo
- Alessandra Leão — Macumbas E Catimbós
- Elba Ramalho — O Ouro Do Pó Da Estrada
- Zé Mulato e Cassiano — Rei Caipira

Best Portuguese Language Song

"Desconstrução"

Tiago Iorc, songwriter (Tiago Iorc)

- "Ansiosos Pra Viver"
  - Mestrinho, songwriters (Mestrinho)
- "Etérea"
  - Criolo, songwriter (Criolo)
- "Mil e Uma"
  - Arnaldo Antunes and Claudia Brant, songwriters (Claudia Brant featuring Arnaldo Antunes)
- "Sem Palavras"
  - Mário Laginha and João Monge, songwriters (António Zambujo)

=== Children's ===
Best Latin Children’s Album

The Lucky Band — Buenos Diaz

- Claraluna — Luces, Cámara, Acción
- Sonia De Los Santos — ¡Alegría!
- Payasitas Nifu Nifa — Bim Bom Bam!
- 123 Andrés — Canta Las Letras

=== Classical ===
Best Classical Album

Samuel Torres and La Nueva Filarmonía — Regreso

- Claudio Constantini — America
- Edith Ruiz — Árboles De Vidrio
- National Symphony Orchestra Of Cuba — Cuba: The Legacy
- Orquesta Sinfónica De Heredia — Solosh

=== Arrangement ===
Best Arrangement

Sirena

Rodner Padilla, arranger (Luis Enrique + C4 Trio)

- Red Wall (Va A Caer)
  - Otmaro Ruiz, arranger (Branly, Ruiz & Haslip)
- Mariachitlán
  - Juan Pablo Contreras, arranger (Juan Pablo Contreras, Marco Parisotto and Orquesta Filarmónica De Jalisco)
- Loko De Amor
  - Pablo Cebrián and Ketama, arranger (Ketama)
- Imprevisto
  - César Orozco, arranger (Raices Jazz Orchestra, Pablo Gil and Tony Succar)

=== Recording Package ===
Best Recording Package

El Mal Querer

Man Mourentan and Tamara Pérez, art directors (Rosalía)

- Anónimas y Resilientes
  - Luisa María Arango, Carlos Dussán, Manuel García-Orozco and Juliana Jaramillo-Buenaventura, art directors (Voces del Bullerengue)
- Astronauta
  - Emilio Lorente, art director (Zahara)
- Lição #2: Dorival
  - Deborah Salles, art directors (Quartabê)
- Nuclear
  - Boa Mistura, art directors (Leiva)

=== Production ===
Best Engineered Album

El Mal Querer

El Guincho and Brian Hernández, engineers; Jaycen Joshua, mixer; Chris Athens, mastering engineer (Rosalía)

- Anaí Rosa Atraca Geraldo Pereira
  - Carlos Lima and Gilberto Monte, engineers; Carlos Lima, mixer; Carlos Lima, mastering engineer (Anaí Rosa)
- Bach
  - Zac Hernández and Jerry Ordoñez, engineers; Jack Lahana, mixer; Chab, mastering engineer (Bandalos Chinos)
- Encontros
  - Roger Freret, engineer; Marcelo Sabóia, mixer; Ron McMaster, mastering engineer (Antonio Adolfo Featuring Orquestra Atlantica)
- Montaner
  - Jan Holzner, David Julca, Jonathan Julca, Jon Leone, Carlos Fernando López, Ricardo López Lalinde, Yasmil Marrufo, Darío Moscatelli, Quaz & Tainy, engineers; Jaycen Joshua, mixer; Mike Bozzi, mastering engineer (Ricardo Montaner)

Producer of the Year

Tony Succar

- **"Amante del amor" (Raul Stefano)**
- **"El Alacrán" (Eric Chacón and Tony Succar)**
- **"El ritmo de mi corazón" (Gian Marco Featuring Grupo 5, Tony Succar)**
- **"Imprevisto" (Raices Jazz Orchestra, Pablo Gil and Tony Succar)**
- **"Mas de mi" (Tony Succar)**
- **"Tonada de Succar" (Eric Chacón and Tony Succar)**
- **"Vai la vai la" (Tony Succar Featuring Marcelo Amaro, Tuti and Nelson Arrieta)**

- Andrés Torres, Mauricio Rengifo
  - Ay Corazón (Cali y El Dandee)
  - Balas Perdidas (Morat)
  - Cobarde (Ximena Sariñana)
  - Fantasía (Sebastián Yatra)
  - La Plata (Juanes Featuring Lalo Ebratt)
  - Perdón (David Bisbal Featuring Greeicy)
  - Quiero Volver (Tini)
  - Serenata (Mike Bahía)
  - Si Tú Te Vas (Ximena Sariñana)
  - Suave y Sutil (Paulina Rubio)
  - Teléfono (Remix) (Aitana with Lele Pons)
  - Todo En Mi Vida (Ximena Sariñana)
  - Vida (Luis Fonsi)
  - Volver A Verte (Fonseca Featuring Cali y El Dandee)
- Julio Reyes Copello
  - Back In The City (Alejandro Sanz Con Nicky Jam)
  - #Eldisco (Alejandro Sanz)
  - Libre (Diana Fuentes)
  - Mi Persona Favorita (Alejandro Sanz Con Camila Cabello)
  - No Tengo Nada (Alejandro Sanz)
  - Nostalgia (Daniela Brooker)
  - Oxígeno (Malú)
  - Visceral (Paula Arenas)
  - Yo Te Extraño (Sebastián Yatra)
- Rafa Sardina
  - Fandango at the Wall: A Soundtrack For The United States, Mexico, And Beyond (Arturo O'Farrill & the Afro Latin Jazz Orchestra)
  - Indestructible (Flor De Toloache)
  - Volver (Plácido Domingo & Pablo Sainz Villegas)
- Juan Pablo Vega
  - Conexión (Juan Pablo Vega)
  - ¿Dónde Bailarán Las Niñas? (Ximena Sariñana)
  - En Medio De Este Ruido (Kurt)
  - Fuimos Amor (Esteman)
  - Sofía (Mario Bautista)
  - Vida De Mis Vidas (Santiago Cruz y Vicente García)

=== Music video ===
Best Short Form Music Video

Kany García and Residente — "Banana Papaya"

Residente, video director; Stephanie "Tuty" Correa, video producer

- Criolo — "Boca de Lobo"
  - Denis Cisma and Pedro Inoue, video directors; Beatriz Berjeaut, video producer
- Nego Do Borel featuring DJ Rennan Da Penha — "Me Solta"
  - Lucas Romor, video director; KondZilla, video producer
- Nach — "Los Zurdos Mueren Antes"
  - Willy Rodriguez, video director; Willy Rodriguez, video producer
- Todo Aparenta Normal — "Vivir Los Colores"
  - Mariano Dawidson, video director; Eric Dawidson, video producer

Best Long Form Music Video

Alejandro Sanz — Lo Que Fui Es Lo Que Soy

Mercedes Cantero, Oscar García Blesa, Gervasio Iglesias and Alexis Morante, video directors; Alvaro Agustin, Ghislain Barrois & Gervasio Iglesias, video producers

- Mastodonte — Anatomía de Un Éxodo
  - Alfonso Cortés-Cabanillas and Asier Etxeandía, video directors; Jose Luis Huertas and Anibal Ruiz-Villar, video producers
- Astor Piazzolla — Piazzolla, Los Años del Tiburón
  - Daniel Rosenfeld, video director; Daniel Rosenfeld, video producer
- Draco Rosa — Hotel de Los Encuentros
  - Henry Duarte, José Luis Jiménez, Miguel Jiménez, Draco Rosa, Redamo Rosa and Revel Rosa, video directors; Hector Espinosa, Mio Hachimori, José Luis Jiménez, Miguel Jiménez, Draco Rosa, Revel Rosa & Sadaharu Yagi, video producers
- Carlos Vives — Déjame Quererte
  - Juan Pablo Caballero and Felipe Cortés, video directors; Nathalie Burnside, video producer

=== Special awards ===
Thalía - President's Merit Award

== Controversy ==
The exclusion of urban entries in the Album, Record, and Song of the Year categories sparked controversy. Colombian singer, J. Balvin started the hashtag #SinReggaetónNoHayGrammyLatino’ (There is no Latin Grammy without Reggaeton) which was soon endorsed by other reggaeton artists such as Daddy Yankee, Becky G, Maite Perroni, Lali Esposito, Tini, Karol G, Natti Natasha, and Anuel AA.
