= List of number-one Billboard Regional Mexican Songs of 2019 =

The Billboard Regional Mexican Songs chart ranks the best-performing Regional Mexican singles in the United States. Published weekly by Billboard magazine, it ranks the "most popular regional Mexican songs, ranked by radio airplay audience impressions as measured by Nielsen Music."

== Chart history ==
Key
†	Indicates best-performing song of 2019

Issue date	Song	Artist(s)	Ref.
January 5	"No Te Contaron Mal"	Christian Nodal	
January 12	"No Te Contaron Mal"	Christian Nodal	
January 19	"No Te Contaron Mal"	Christian Nodal	
January 26	"Nunca Es Suficiente" †	Los Angeles Azules featuring Natalia Lafourcade	
February 2	"Nunca Es Suficiente" †	Los Angeles Azules featuring Natalia Lafourcade	
February 9	"Nunca Es Suficiente" †	Los Angeles Azules featuring Natalia Lafourcade	
February 16	"A Traves del Vaso"	Banda Los Sebastianes	
February 23	"A Traves del Vaso"	Banda Los Sebastianes	
March 2	"A Traves del Vaso"	Banda Los Sebastianes	
March 9	"A Traves del Vaso"	Banda Los Sebastianes	
March 16	"A Traves del Vaso"	Banda Los Sebastianes	
March 23	"A Traves del Vaso"	Banda Los Sebastianes	
March 30	"Con Todo Incluido"	La Adictiva Banda San José de Mesillas	
April 6	"Con Todo Incluido"	La Adictiva Banda San José de Mesillas	
April 13	"¿Por Que Cambiaste de Opinion?"	Calibre 50	
April 20	"¿Por Que Cambiaste de Opinion?"	Calibre 50	
April 27	"Por Siempre Mi Amor"	Banda Sinaloense MS de Sergio Lizarraga	
May 4	"Nada Nuevo"	Christian Nodal	
May 11	"Nada Nuevo"	Christian Nodal	
May 18	"Nada Nuevo"	Christian Nodal	
May 25	"Nada Nuevo"	Christian Nodal	
June 1	"Encantadora"	El Fantasma	
June 8	"Encantadora"	El Fantasma	
June 15	"Encantadora"	El Fantasma	
June 22	"Encantadora"	El Fantasma	
June 29	"Tiene Razon La Logica"	La Arrolladora Banda el Limon de Rene Camacho	
July 6	"El Amor de Mi Vida"	La Adictiva Banda San José De Mesillas	
July 13	"Perfecta"	Banda Los Recoditos	
July 20	"Perfecta"	Banda Los Recoditos	
July 27	"Perfecta"	Banda Los Recoditos	
August 3	"Simplemente Gracias"	Calibre 50	
August 10	"Simplemente Gracias"	Calibre 50	
August 17	"Simplemente Gracias"	Calibre 50	
August 24	"De Los Besos Que Te Di"	Christian Nodal	
August 31	"De Los Besos Que Te Di"	Christian Nodal	
September 7	"De Los Besos Que Te Di"	Christian Nodal	
September 14	"De Los Besos Que Te Di"	Christian Nodal	
September 21	"De Los Besos Que Te Di"	Christian Nodal	
September 28	"De Los Besos Que Te Di"	Christian Nodal	
October 5	"De Los Besos Que Te Di"	Christian Nodal	
October 12	"Cedi"	La Arrolladora Banda el Limon de Rene Camacho	
October 19	"Cedi"	La Arrolladora Banda el Limon de Rene Camacho	
October 26	"Cedi"	La Arrolladora Banda el Limon de Rene Camacho	
November 2	"Cedi"	La Arrolladora Banda el Limon de Rene Camacho	
November 9	"Mi Meta Contigo"	Banda Los Sebastianes de Mazatlán, Sinaloa.	
November 16	"Mi Meta Contigo"	Banda Los Sebastianes de Mazatlán, Sinaloa.	
November 23	"Mi Meta Contigo"	Banda Los Sebastianes de Mazatlán, Sinaloa.	
November 30	"Mi Meta Contigo"	Banda Los Sebastianes de Mazatlán, Sinaloa.	
December 7	"Mi Meta Contigo"	Banda Los Sebastianes de Mazatlán, Sinaloa.	
December 14	"Mi Meta Contigo"	Banda Los Sebastianes de Mazatlán, Sinaloa.	
December 21	"Escondidos"	La Adictiva Banda San Jose de Mesillas	
December 28	"Escondidos"	La Adictiva Banda San Jose de Mesillas	
