= Aventura (song) =

2019 song by Lunay, Ozuna and Anuel AA

Single by Lunay, Ozuna and Anuel AA

from the album Épico
- Language: Spanish
- English title: "Adventure"
- Released: October 25, 2019
- Genre: Reggaeton
- Length: 3:37
- Label: Star Island
- Songwriters: Chris Jedi; Gaby Music; Jefnier Osorio; Jorge Echevarria; Luis Ortiz; Nino Karla Segarra
- Producers: Chris Jedi; Gaby Music

Lunay singles chronology
"A Solas" (2018)	"Aventura" (2019)	"Llégale" (2019)

Ozuna singles chronology
"Nadie (Remix)" (2019)	"Aventura" (2019)	"Hasta Que Salga El Sol" (2019)

Anuel AA singles chronology
"Yes" (2019)	"Aventura" (2019)	"Me Gusta" (2020)

"Aventura" (English: "Adventure") is a song by Puerto Rican musicians Lunay, Ozuna and Anuel AA. The song was released on October 25, 2019, as the fifth single from Lunay's debut album Épico. The song debuted number one on the Billboard Latin Airplay chart.

== Charts ==
=== Weekly charts ===
Chart (2019)	Peak position
Argentina (Argentina Hot 100)	16
Puerto Rico (Monitor Latino)	1
Spain (PROMUSICAE)	9
US Bubbling Under Hot 100 (Billboard)	20
US Latin Airplay (Billboard)	1
US Latin Rhythm Airplay (Billboard)	1
US Hot Latin Songs (Billboard)	11

=== Year-end charts ===
Chart (2020)	Position
US Hot Latin Songs (Billboard)	62

== Certifications ==
Region	Certification	Certified units/sales
Spain (Promusicae)	2× Platinum	80,000^{‡}
^{‡} Sales+streaming figures based on certification alone.

== See also ==
- List of Billboard Hot Latin Songs and Latin Airplay number ones of 2019
