= Épico =

Studio album by Lunay
- Released: October 25, 2019
- Genre: Reggaeton; Latin trap; dancehall
- Length: 47:00
- Label: Star Island
- Producer: Chris Jedi; Haze; Gaby Music

Singles from Épico
- 1. "A Solas (Remix)" Released: December 7, 2018; 2. "Soltera" Released: February 21, 2019; 3. "Soltera (Remix)" Released: May 10, 2019; 4. "La Cama" Released: October 14, 2019; 5. "Aventura" Released: October 25, 2019

Épico is the debut studio album by Puerto Rican singer Lunay. Released on October 25, 2019, under the label Star Island, the album features 14 tracks, and features collaborations with urban artists such as Daddy Yankee, Bad Bunny, Ozuna, Anuel AA, Myke Towers, Wisin & Yandel, Brytiago, Lyanno, Alex Rose, Darell, Chris Jedi and Gaby Music. It was released 14 months after Lunay started his musical career.

== Critical reception ==
Remezcla called Épico a "14-track wonder of reggaeton, Latin trap and dancehall influences that mark a young artist who is already well on his way to mainstay status in música urbana. (Épico is certainly a manifestation, if not ambitious, in its "epic" name.)"

== Track listing ==
No.	Title	Length
1.	"Envidia"	1:17
2.	"Aventura" (featuring Ozuna and Anuel AA)	3:37
3.	"360"	2:56
4.	"La Cama" (featuring Myke Towers)	3:09
5.	"Malas Intenciones"	2:56
6.	"Remate"	3:27
7.	"Soltera (remix)" (featuring Daddy Yankee and Bad Bunny)	4:26
8.	"Mi Favorita" (featuring Wisin & Yandel)	3:50
9.	"Todavia"	3:38
10.	"Por Mi Culpa"	3:22
11.	"Amigos Na' Más" (featuring Darell)	4:22
12.	"Quiero"	3:10
13.	"A Solas (remix)" (featuring Anuel AA, Lyanno, Brytiago, and Alex Rose)	4:33
14.	"Soltera"	3:34
Total length:		47:00

== Charts ==
=== Weekly charts ===
Chart (2019–2020)	Peak position
US Billboard 200	79
US Top Latin Albums (Billboard)	2
US Latin Rhythm Albums (Billboard)	2
US Independent Albums (Billboard)	32

=== Year-end charts ===
Chart (2019)	Position
US Top Latin Albums (Billboard)	71
Chart (2020)	Position
US Top Latin Albums (Billboard)	14
Chart (2021)	Position
US Top Latin Albums (Billboard)	66
