= No Me Conoce =

2019 single by Jhayco

Single by Jhayco

from the album Famouz
- Language: Spanish
- English title: "Doesn't Know Me"
- Released: February 22, 2019
- Genre: Reggaeton
- Length: 3:59
- Label: Universal Latino
- Songwriters: Nieves Cortés; Yera; Benito Antonio Martínez Ocasio; José Alvaro Osorio Balvin; Michael Masís; Misael de la Cruz Reynoso

Jhayco singles chronology
"Costear" (2019)	"No Me Conoce" (2019)	"Deséame Suerte" (2019)

Bad Bunny singles chronology
"Soltera (remix)" (2019)	"No Me Conoce (remix)" (2019)	"Estamos Arriba" (2019)

Music video
- "No Me Conoce (remix)" on YouTube

"No Me Conoce" (transl. "Doesn't Know Me") is a song by Puerto Rican rapper and singer Jhayco, released as the third single from his second studio album Famouz on February 22, 2019. It was later released in a version with J Balvin and Bad Bunny, and charted on the US Billboard Hot 100. As of September 2026, the music video has received over 2.6 billion views.

== Critical reception ==
Matthew Ismael Ruiz of Vulture called the song a "romp that splits the difference between the classic reggaeton riddim and Latin trap's swirling atmospherics". Writing for Noisey, Gary Suarez said of the remix that it "showcases [Jhayco's] skills as both popwise hooksmith and adept spitter more than capable of contending with two of urbano's best known acts."

== Charts ==
=== Weekly charts ===
Weekly chart performance for "No Me Conoce"
Chart (2019)	Peak position
Bolivia (Monitor Latino)	14
Puerto Rico (Monitor Latino)	1
Spain (Promusicae)	4

Chart (2026)	Peak position
Portugal (AFP)	102

Weekly chart performance for "No Me Conoce (Remix)"
Chart (2019)	Peak position
Argentina (Argentina Hot 100)	4
Colombia (National-Report)	3
Dominican Republic (SODINPRO)	1
US Billboard Hot 100	71
US Hot Latin Songs (Billboard)	4
US Latin Airplay (Billboard)	2
US Latin Rhythm Airplay (Billboard)	2

=== Year-end charts ===
Chart (2019)	Position
Spain (PROMUSICAE)	9
US Hot Latin Songs (Billboard)	9
Chart (2020)	Position
US Hot Latin Songs (Billboard)	20

== Certifications ==
Certifications for "No Me Conoce"
Region	Certification	Certified units/sales
Brazil (Pro-Música Brasil)	2× Platinum	80,000^{‡}
Italy (FIMI)	Gold	35,000^{‡}
Portugal (AFP)	Platinum	25,000^{‡}
Spain (Promusicae)	7× Platinum	420,000^{‡}
United States (RIAA) Remix	9× Diamond (Latin)	5,400,000^{‡}
^{‡} Sales+streaming figures based on certification alone.

== See also ==
- List of Billboard Argentina Hot 100 top-ten singles in 2019
