= Soltera (Lunay, Chris Jedi and Gaby Music song) =

2019 song by Puerto Rican singer Lunay

Single by Lunay, Chris Jedi and Gaby Music

from the album Épico
- Language: Spanish
- English title: "Single"
- Released: February 21, 2019
- Genre: Reggaeton
- Length: 3:33
- Label: Star Island
- Songwriters: Chris Jedi; Gaby Music; Jefnier Osorio; Jorge Echevarria; Luis Ortiz; Nino Karla Segarra
- Producers: Chris Jedi; Gaby Music

Lunay singles chronology
"A Solas" (2018)	"Soltera" (2019)	"Llégale" (2019)

Daddy Yankee singles chronology
"Baila Baila Baila (Remix)" (2019)	"Soltera (Remix)" (2019)	"No Lo Trates" (2019)

Bad Bunny singles chronology
"Callaíta" (2019)	"Soltera (Remix)" (2019)	"No Me Conoce (Remix)" (2019)

Remix cover

Music video
- "Soltera (Remix)" on YouTube

"Soltera" (transl. "Single") is a song by Puerto Rican singer Lunay and Puerto Rican producers Chris Jedi and Gaby Music, released through Star Island on February 21, 2019. A remix with Puerto Rican rappers Daddy Yankee and Bad Bunny was released on May 10, 2019. Following the release of the remix, it debuted at number one in Spain and reached number 66 on the US Billboard Hot 100.

== Background ==
Suzy Exposito of Rolling Stone wrote that the song is about women who prefer being single and who "don't fall in love". The remix version featuring Puerto Rican rappers Daddy Yankee and Bad Bunny includes a sample of the chorus of the former's 2002 song "Ella Está Soltera".

== Critical reception ==
Exposito of Rolling Stone called it a "delectable, standout summer anthem".

== Commercial performance ==
In the United States, the original version of "Soltera" debuted at number 45 on Billboard's Hot Latin Songs chart on March 23, 2019, eventually peaking at number 38 on March 30. Following the release of the remix version featuring Daddy Yankee and Bad Bunny, the single peaked at number three on May 25, 2019, becoming Lunay's first top five song on the list, as well as Daddy Yankee's 18th and Bad Bunny's sixth. On the Latin Rhythm Airplay chart, the remix marked Daddy Yankee's record extending 46th top 10. On the US Billboard Hot 100, the remix version debuted at number 73 on the week ending May 25, 2019.

== Music video ==
A music video was released for both the original song and for the remix, the latter featuring Lunay, Daddy Yankee and Bad Bunny crashing a bachelorette party.

== Charts ==
=== Weekly charts ===
Weekly chart performance for "Soltera"
Chart (2019)	Peak position
Ecuador (Monitor Latino)	12
El Salvador (Monitor Latino)	16
Italy (FIMI)	61
Mexico (Billboard Espanol Airplay)	18
Puerto Rico (Monitor Latino)	3
Spain (Promusicae)	3
Switzerland (Schweizer Hitparade)	58
Venezuela (Monitor Latino)	14

Weekly chart performance for "Soltera (Remix version)"
Chart (2019)	Peak position
Argentina (Argentina Hot 100)	3
Chile (Monitor Latino)	3
Colombia (Monitor Latino)	2
Dominican Republic (Monitor Latino)	9
Honduras (Monitor Latino)	5
Nicaragua (Monitor Latino)	6
Paraguay (Monitor Latino)	6
Panama (Monitor Latino)	9
Peru (Monitor Latino)	14
Spain (PROMUSICAE)	1
Uruguay (Monitor Latino)	5
US Billboard Hot 100	66
US Hot Latin Songs (Billboard)	3
US Latin Airplay (Billboard)	1
US Latin Rhythm Airplay (Billboard)	1

=== Year-end charts ===
Chart (2019)	Position
Spain (PROMUSICAE)	8
US Hot Latin Songs (Billboard)	8

== Certifications ==
Region	Certification	Certified units/sales
Italy (FIMI)	Platinum	100,000^{‡}
Spain (Promusicae)	Platinum	40,000^{‡}
Spain (Promusicae) Soltera (remix)	5× Platinum	300,000^{‡}
^{‡} Sales+streaming figures based on certification alone.

== See also ==
- List of Billboard Argentina Hot 100 top-ten singles in 2019
- List of Billboard number-one Latin songs of 2019
