= Rita Vidaurri =

American Tejana singer (1924–2019)

Rita Vidaurri (May 22, 1924 – January 16, 2019) was a Tejana singer from San Antonio, Texas, who worked with Nat King Cole, Pedro Infante, Jorge Negrete and Eva Garza.

Gifted with a powerful voice from a musical family, Vidaurri had to hide her gift from her saloon-owning father. As a pre-teen, her mother would take her to a local amateur singing contest in San Antonio, where she won the five-dollar first prize 18 weeks in a row. Vidaurri was only 14 when her mother died. At the time, she would perform in one of her father's saloons with her sister as "Las Hermanas Vidaurri."
