= Lunay (singer) =

Puerto Rican singer

- Born: Jefnier Osorio Moreno; October 4, 2000 (age 26); Corozal, Puerto Rico
- Genre: Reggaeton
- Occupations: Singer; songwriter
- Instrument: Vocals
- Years active: 2017–present
- Labels: La Familia, Rimas

Jefnier Osorio Moreno (born October 4, 2000), known professionally as Lunay, is a Puerto Rican singer and songwriter. He rose to fame in the Latin urban scene with the songs "Soltera", "No Te Quieren Conmigo", "La Cama", "A Solas" and "Aventura". On October 25, 2019, he released his debut album Épico.

== Early life ==
As a child, his true passion was the drums and soccer. Thanks to the sport of soccer Osorio found his vocation in music. At an early age he knew he wanted to be part of the urban genre, motivated by what other singers of the genre in Latin America were achieving. At age 12, he began recording freestyle raps, which he uploaded to Facebook. He used to improvise in front of his soccer teammates, with several of his clips going viral. His freestyle raps caught the attention of producers like Chris Jedi and Gaby Music.

== Career ==
In 2017, he started uploading small musical projects to SoundCloud under the name of "Jefnier", entering more seriously in the music industry. In 2017, he launched "Aparentas", reaching thousands of reproductions on this platform, attracting the attention of two of the most recognized producers in Puerto Rico: Chris Jedi and Gaby Music. Both producers contacted the young Puerto Rican offering him a record deal and after signing, in May 2018, he changed his stage name to Lunay.

That same month he released the song "Si Te Vas Conmigo", and a month later "Dejame Saber". The same year they came out with "A Solas" featuring Lyanno and "Como La Primera Vez" with Amarion. One of his first collaborations was "Luz Apaga" with Ozuna, Rauw Alejandro and Lyanno, reaching millions of views on YouTube. At the end of 2018, the remix of "A Solas" was released with Anuel AA, Brytiago and Alex Rose, positioning for several days on the YouTube Trending page. In March 2019, he released his single "Soltera", which achieved more than five million views in five days on YouTube. "Soltera" was also remixed in a version with Puerto Rican rappers Daddy Yankee and Bad Bunny. On August 5, 2020, he also collaborated with fellow American rapper Lil Mosey on the single "Top Gone". The single appeared on the deluxe edition of the latter's second studio album "Certified Hitmaker".

== Musical style ==
On his musical style, Lunay has commented that his songs do not encourage violence or denigrate women. In an interview he gave to the top 40, he said: "Not necessarily, even if I am in this world of urban music, [do] I have to be fostering violence, which is against God's purpose. I just do what I like and I know the relationship I have with Him." He won the award for artist "on the rise" at the 2019 Premios Juventud.

== Discography ==
=== Studio albums ===
List of studio albums, with selected details and chart positions
Title	Studio album details	Peak chart positions		
Title	Studio album details	US	US Latin	SPA
Épico	Released: October 25, 2019; Label: Star Island; Format: CD, digital download, streaming	79	2	9
El Niño	Released: May 21, 2021; Label: La Familia; Format: CD, digital download, streaming	—	—	—
"—" denotes a title that was not released or did not chart in that territory.

=== EPs ===
List of EPs, with selected details and chart positions
Title	EP details		
Title	EP details	Noche de Travesuras - EP	Released: June 5, 2020; Label: Star Island; Format: digital download, streaming
Si Te Dejas Llevar - EP	Released: June 12, 2020; Label: Star Island; Format: digital download, streaming		
Esta de Moda - EP	Released: June 19, 2020; Label: Star Island; Format: digital download, streaming		

=== Singles ===
==== As lead artist ====
List of singles as lead artist, with selected chart positions and certifications, showing year released and album name
Title	Year	Peak chart positions							Certifications	Album
Title	Year	US	US Latin	ARG	MEX Pop	ITA	SPA	SWI	Certifications	Album
"Si Te Vas Conmigo"	2018	—	—	—	—	—	—	—		Non-album singles
"Déjame Saber"	2018	—	—	—	—	—	—	—		Non-album singles
"Como La Primera Vez" (with Amarion)	2018	—	—	—	—	—	—	—		Non-album singles
"A Solas" (with Lyanno)	2018	—	—	—	—	—	—	—		Non-album singles
"A Solas (Remix)" (with Lyanno, and Anuel AA, Brytiago and Alex Rose)	2018	—	—	—	—	—	39	—	RIAA: Platinum (Latin); PROMUSICAE: Platinum	Épico
"Es Normal (Remix)" (with Javiielo & Rauw Alejandro featuring Papi Sousa & Lyanno)	2019	—	—	—	—	—	—	—		Non-album single
"Soltera"	2019	—	38	55	—	—	3	58	PROMUSICAE: Platinum	Épico
"Soltera (Remix)" (with Daddy Yankee and Bad Bunny)	2019	66	3	3	21	61	1	—	FIMI: Gold; PROMUSICAE: 3× Platinum	Épico
"Llégale" (with Zion & Lennox)	2019	—	—	—	—	—	41	—	PROMUSICAE: Gold	Non-album singles
"Mi Llamada (Remix)" (with Lyanno & Rauw Alejandro featuring Alex Rose, Cazzu, Eladio Carrión & Lenny Tavárez)	2019	—	—	—	—	—	—	—		Non-album singles
"La Boca (Remix)" (with Mau y Ricky & Camilo)	2019	—	—	—	—	—	—	—		Non-album singles
"Fin De Semana"	2019	—	—	—	—	—	—	—		Non-album singles
"Nadie (Remix)" (with Farruko & Ozuna featuring Sech & Sharo Towers)	2019	—	—	—	—	—	—	—		Non-album singles
"La Cama" (with Myke Towers)	2019	—	—	35	—	—	19	—	PROMUSICAE: Gold	Épico
"Aventura" (with Anuel AA and Ozuna)	2019	—	11	16	—	—	5	—	PROMUSICAE: Platinum	Épico
"Mojadero" (with Mark B and Lirico En La Casa)	2019	—	—	—	—	—	—	—		Non-album single
"La Cama (Remix)" (with Myke Towers & Ozuna featuring Chencho Corleone & Rauw Alejandro)	2020	—	—	—	—	—	—	—		Non-album single
"Como Suena el Piano (Remix)" (with Arthur Hanlon & Orishas)	2020	—	—	—	—	—	—	—		Non-album single
"Quizás" (with Brytiago and Ozuna)	2020	—	—	—	—	—	—	—	RIAA: Gold (Latin)	Orgánico
"Relaciones"	2020	—	—	—	—	—	—	—		Non-album singles
"Top Gone" (with Lil Mosey)	2020	—	—	—	—	—	—	—		Non-album singles
"Prendemos" (with Haze & Jhayco)	2020	—	—	—	—	—	—	—	RIAA: 2× Platinum (Latin)	Non-album singles
"Victoria" (with Beéle)	2020	—	—	—	—	—	—	—		Non-album singles
"Only Fans (Remix)" (with Young Martino and Myke Towers featuring Jhayco, Arcángel, Darell, Ñengo Flow, Brray & Joyce Santana)	2020	—	—	—	—	—	94	—	RIAA: 2× Platinum (Latin)	Non-album singles
"Fantasía Sexual" (with Brytiago & Revol featuring Myke Towers & Rauw Alejandro)	2021	—	—	—	—	—	—	—		Non-album singles
"Cuándo Será" (with Mora)	2021	—	—	—	—	—	—	—		Primer Día de Clases
"Sin Ropa"	2021	—	—	—	—	—	—	—		Non-album single
"No Toque Mi Naik" (with Nicki Nicole)	2021	—	—	16	—	—	52	—	RIAA: Gold (Latin)	Non-album single
"LE GUSTA QUE LA VEAN"	2021	—	—	—	—	—	—	—		El Niño
"TODO O NADA" (with Anitta)	2021	—	—	—	—	—	—	—		El Niño
"VUDÚ" (with Chencho Corleone & Chris Jedi)	2021	—	—	—	—	—	—	—		El Niño
"TBC"	2021	—	—	—	—	—	—	—		El Niño
"Tú Recuerdo" (with Pacho El Antifeka)	2021	—	—	—	—	—	—	—		All Star Game
"Ella (Remix)" (with Boza, Lenny Tavárez, Juhn and Beéle)	2021	—	—	50	—	—	51	—	RIAA: Platinum (Latin)	Non-album singles
"Dos Opciones" (with Lyanno)	2021	—	—	—	—	—	—	—		El Cambio
"787"	2021	—	—	—	—	—	—	—		Non-album single
"Un Ratito" (with Alok and Luis Fonsi featuring Lenny Tavárez and Juliette)	2022	—	—	—	—	—	—	—		Non-album single
"Bandida"	2022	—	—	—	—	—	—	—		Non-album single
"Epapale"	2022	—	—	—	—	—	—	—		Non-album single
"Condado" (with Chris Jedi and Young Miko)	2022	—	—	—	—	—	—	—		Non-album single
"Nuevo" (with YOVNGCHIMI)	2022	—	—	—	—	—	—	—		Non-album single
"Ronca"	2023	—	—	—	—	—	—	—		Non-album single
"Baby" (with YOVNGCHIMI)	2023	—	—	—	—	—	—	—		WLGS
"No Te Quieren Conmigo" (with Gaby Music and Luar La L or remix with Anuel AA featuring Bryant Myers)	2023	—	36	56	—	—	—	—		Non-album single
"—" denotes a title that was not released or did not chart in that territory.

==== As a featured artist ====
List of singles as a featured artist, with selected chart positions and certifications, showing year released and album name
Title	Year	Peak chart positions				Certifications	Album
Title	Year	US Latin	ARG	MEX	SPA	Certifications	Album
"Como Te Gusta" (Lee Bryan featuring Lunay)	2018	—	—	—	—		Non-album singles
"Luz Apaga" (Ozuna featuring Lunay, Rauw Alejandro and Lyanno)	2018	26	63	33	50	PROMUSICAE: Gold	Non-album singles
"Costear (Equipo Negro Remix)" (Jhayco, Almighty and De La Ghetto featuring Álvaro Díaz, Brray, Rafa Pabön, Lunay, Myke Towers and Alex Rose)	2019	—	—	—	—		Non-album singles
"El Favor" (Dimelo Flow, Nicky Jam and Sech featuring Farruko, Zion and Lunay)	2019	21	26	—	30	RIAA: 2× Platinum (Latin); PROMUSICAE: Gold	Non-album singles
"Mi Error (Remix)" (Eladio Carrión, Zion & Lennox and Wisin & Yandel featuring Lunay)	2019	—	—	—	—		Non-album singles
"Fantasías (Remix)" (Rauw Alejandro, Anuel AA & NATTI NATASHA featuring Farruko & Lunay)	2020	—	—	—	—		Non-album singles
"La Curiosidad (Blue Grand Prix Remix)" (Jay Wheeler, Myke Towers & Rauw Alejandro featuring DJ Nelson, Jhayco, Lunay & Kendo Kaponi)	2020	—	—	—	—		Non-album singles
"—" denotes a title that was not released or did not chart in that territory.

=== Other charted and certified songs ===
List of other charted songs, with chart positions, showing year released
Title	Year	Peaks	Certifications	Album
Title	Year	SPA	Certifications	Album
"En Mi Habitación" (with Wisin and Rauw Alejandro featuring Los Legendarios)	2021	—	RIAA: Gold (Latin)	Los Legendarios 001
"—" denotes a title that was not released or did not chart in that territory.

=== Guest appearances ===
Title	Year	Other artist(s)	Album
"Te Irás con El Año Viejo"	2019	Vico C	Tiempos de Aguinaldo
"Subconsciente"	2020	Yandel	Quien Contra Mí 2
"Nena Buena"	2021	Eladio Carrión	Monarca
"Código Secreto"	2021	vf7	Núcleo
"On The Go"	2021	Bebe Rexha & Pink Sweat$	Better Mistakes
"Volao"	2022	Chanell	No More Tears
"Top 10"	2023	Omy de Oro	Códigos
"Vicio"	2023	Juliito	El Castillo
