= Back in the City =

Single by Alejandro Sanz & Nicky Jam

from the album #ElDisco
- Released: 7 February 2019
- Genre: Latin pop; Latin trap
- Length: 3:22
- Label: Universal Music Spain
- Songwriters: Alejandro Sánchez Pizarro; Nick Rivera Caminero; Anjeanette Chirino; Emilio Estefan; Juan Diego Medina
- Producers: Pizarro; Alfonso Pérez; Julio Reyes

Alejandro Sanz singles chronology
"No Tengo Nada" (2018)	"Back in the City" (2019)	"Mi Persona Favorita" (2019)

Nicky Jam singles chronology
"Good Vibes" (2018)	"Back in the City" (2019)	"Te Robaré" (2019)

Music video
- "Back in the City" on YouTube

"Back in the City" is a song by Spanish singer Alejandro Sanz and American singer Nicky Jam, from Sanz's twelfth studio album #ElDisco. The song was released by Universal Music Spain as the album's second single on 7 February 2019. The song reached number one in Nicaragua, and the top 10 in Guatemala and Venezuela.

== Background ==
This is Sanz's first English single since "Looking for Paradise" (2009), a duet with American singer-songwriter Alicia Keys.

== Music video ==
The music video of the song was released on 7 February 2019, featuring Sanz and Nicky Jam.

== Charts ==
Chart (2019)	Peak position
El Salvador (Monitor Latino)	12
Guatemala (Monitor Latino)	10
Nicaragua (Monitor Latino)	1
Panama (Monitor Latino)	16
Spain (PROMUSICAE)	20
US Latin Pop Songs (Billboard)	31
Venezuela (National-Report)	5

== Release history ==
Region	Date	Format	Label
United States	7 February 2019	Digital download; streaming	Universal Music Spain
