= El Disco =

Studio album by Alejandro Sanz
- Released: 5 April 2019
- Recorded: 2018–2019
- Genre: Latin pop
- Length: 35:01
- Language: Spanish
- Label: Universal Music Spain
- Producers: Alejandro Sanz; Alfonso Pérez; Julio Reyes Copello

Alejandro Sanz chronology
Sirope (2015)	El Disco (2019)	Sanz (2021)

Singles from #ElDisco
- 1. "No Tengo Nada" Released: 30 November 2018; 2. "Back in the City" Released: 8 February 2019; 3. "Mi Persona Favorita" Released: 28 March 2019; 4. "El Trato" Released: 25 April 2019

El Disco (stylized as #ELDISCO) is the twelfth studio album recorded by Spanish singer-songwriter Alejandro Sanz. It was released on 5 April 2019 and won the Grammy Award for Best Latin Pop Album.

== Singles ==
"No Tengo Nada" was released on 30 November 2018 as the album's lead single. On 8 February 2019, "Back in the City" was released as the album's second single. "Mi Persona Favorita" was released on 28 March 2019 as the album's third single.

== Track listing ==
No.	Title	Writer(s)	Producer(s)	Length
1.	"El Trato"	Sanz	Sanz; Alfonso Pérez; Julio Reyes Copello	4:18
2.	"Mi Persona Favorita" (with Camila Cabello)	Sanz; Cabello	Sanz; Pérez; Reyes	3:59
3.	"No Tengo Nada"	Sanz	Sanz; Pérez; Reyes	3:45
4.	"Te Canto un Son"	Sanz	Sanz; Pérez; Reyes	3:12
5.	"Los Lugares" (with Residente)	Sanz; René Pérez	Sanz; Pérez; Reyes	3:28
6.	"Back in the City" (with Nicky Jam)	Sanz; Nick Rivera Caminero; Anjeanette Chirino; Emilio Estefan; Juan Diego Medina	Sanz; Pérez; Reyes	3:21
7.	"Este Segundo" (featuring Judit Neddermann)	Sanz; Neddermann	Sanz; Pérez; Reyes	2:25
8.	"Azúcar en un Bowl"	Sanz	Sanz; Pérez; Reyes	3:43
9.	"It's OK"	Sanz	Sanz; Pérez; Reyes	3:32
10.	"Te Canto un Son" (Binaural Mix)	Sanz	Sanz; Pérez; Reyes	3:12
Total length:				35:01

== Accolades ==
Year	Award ceremony	Category	Result
2019	Latin Grammy Award	Album of the Year	Nominated
2019	Latin Grammy Award	Best Contemporary Pop Vocal Album	Nominated
2020	Grammy Award	Best Latin Pop Album	Won

== Charts ==
=== Weekly charts ===
Weekly chart performance for #ELDISCO
Chart (2019)	Peak position
Mexican Albums (AMPROFON)	2
Spanish Albums (PROMUSICAE)	1
US Top Latin Albums (Billboard)	36
US Latin Pop Albums (Billboard)	11

=== Year-end charts ===
Year-end chart performance for #ELDISCO
Chart (2019)	Position
Spanish Albums (PROMUSICAE)	1
Chart (2020)	Position
Spanish Albums (PROMUSICAE)	21

== Certifications ==
Certifications for #ELDISCO
Region	Certification	Certified units/sales
Mexico (AMPROFON)	Gold	30,000^{‡}
Spain (Promusicae)	3× Platinum	120,000^{‡}
^{‡} Sales+streaming figures based on certification alone.
