= Mi Persona Favorita =

Single by Alejandro Sanz and Camila Cabello

from the album El Disco
- Language: Spanish
- Released: 28 March 2019
- Studio: Art House (Miami, FL)
- Genre: Flamenco pop
- Length: 4:00
- Label: Universal Music Spain
- Songwriters: Alejandro Sanz; Camila Cabello
- Producers: Alejandro Sanz; Alfonso Pérez; Julio Reyes Copello

Alejandro Sanz singles chronology
"Back in the City" (2019)	"Mi Persona Favorita" (2019)	"El Trato" (2019)

Camila Cabello singles chronology
"Consequences" (2018)	"Mi Persona Favorita" (2019)	"Find U Again" (2019)

Music video
- "Mi Persona Favorita" on YouTube

"Mi Persona Favorita" (transl. "My Favorite Person") is a song by Spanish singer Alejandro Sanz and American singer Camila Cabello, from Sanz's twelfth studio album El Disco (2019). The song was released by Universal Music Spain on March 28, 2019, as the album's third single accompanied by its music video, which first premiered on Sanz's official Vevo channel and directed by American director Gil Green.

The composition and lyrics of the song were written by Sanz and Cabello. The track was produced by the former and music producers Alfonso Pérez and Julio Reyes Copello. The City of Prague Philharmonic Orchestra played orchestra for the song, which was conducted by Czech conductor Adam Klemens, who also played the piano for the song. Spanish flamenco guitarist José Miguel Carmona, lead guitarist from Spanish new flamenco musical group Ketama, played the flamenco guitar. Twice Grammy Award-winning American drummer Larnell Lewis played drums for the song. The song topped the charts in Costa Rica, El Salvador, Guatemala, Nicaragua and Panama. It was the Record of the Year and Best Pop Song at the 20th Annual Latin Grammy Awards. It was also nominated for Song of the Year.

== Background ==
Cabello revealed how the collaboration was born, stating that Sanz invited her to Miami in summer 2018 to record the song and film the music video together:

"Last summer, Alejandro called me and asked if I could fly to Miami to do a song together for his new album. It's not a secret that I’ve been his fan all my life and his offer left me petrified. And, without waiting another minute I took the first flight to Miami!” "Alejandro, your music has been the soundtrack of my family's life and mine. And, now I have the privilege to call you my friend and collaborator (I still can't believe it). Making this song with you has been something really special and an adventure. Thank you for thinking of me and for inviting me to work together.”

She continued, adding that she dedicated the song to her little sister, Sofi, who she considers her "favorite person."

== Composition and lyrics ==
"Mi Persona Favorita" is a flamenco pop ballad, featuring Spanish flamenco guitarist José Miguel Carmona, lead guitarist from Spanish new flamenco musical group Ketama playing the flamenco guitar in the song. As Jeff Benjamin of Forbes opined, musically, it delivers the kind of quality duet longtime Sanz fans love for the singer and his penchant for flamenco inspired music style, and layers the two singers' distinct vocal timbres—both raspy with the slightest bit of native twang—into a soothing, snappy acoustic cut. Lyrically, it's easy enough for any of the performers' young fans to sing along with—regardless of their native language.

== Commercial performance ==
The song debuted at 22 on Spanish official single chart on 8 March 2019 and reached number-four on Billboard Spain Digital Song Sales chart on 11 May 2019. This song later reached number-one on Spanish official airplay chart. The song is certified as Platinum for selling over 40,000 digital copies in Spain in May 2019, and certified as Gold (Latin) in the United States and Puerto Rico by RIAA on 31 July 2019.

Internationally, the song became a great success in Central America, reaching number one in Costa Rica, Guatemala, El Salvador, Nicaragua and Panama. In Europe, the song reached number-six on Billboard Euro Digital Song Sales chart on 29 May 2019.

== Music videos ==
The official music video of the song was released on 28 March 2019. It's directed by American director Gil Green, who formerly collaborated with Cabello on the video of "Hey Ma". The video shows both Sanz and Cabello singing and vibing together at the recording studio, but the larger story is the couples featured throughout the visual. Couples pose in front of a white backdrop. The visual begins and ends with pairs expressing what they love most about their partners. A vertical video was released on 29 March 2019 on Spotify and Apple Music.

== Accolades ==
Year	Organization	Award	Result	Ref.
2019	LOS40 Music Awards	Song of the Year	Nominated	
2019	Latin Grammy Awards	Record of the Year	Won	
2019	Latin Grammy Awards	Song of the Year	Nominated	
2019	Latin Grammy Awards	Best Pop Song	Won	

== Track listings ==
Digital download
No.	Title	Length
1.	"Mi Persona Favorita"	2:58

Digital download – live version
No.	Title	Length
1.	"Mi Persona Favorita" (En Directo en el Wanda Metropolitano / Madrid / 2019)	3:01

== Credits and personnel ==
Credits adapted from Tidal.

Personnel

- Alejandro Sanz – vocals, lyrics, composition, co-production, recording arrangement
- Camila Cabello – vocals, lyrics, composition
- The City of Prague Philharmonic Orchestra – orchestra
- Adam Klemens – conducting, piano
- José Miguel Carmona – flamenco guitar
- Larnell Lewis – drums
- Alfonso Pérez – production, keyboards, programming, recording arrangement, recording engineering, string arrangement, studio personnel
- Julio Reyes Copello – production, keyboards, recording arrangement, recording engineering, string arrangement, studio personnel
- Natalia Ramírez – vocal production, associate performing
- Gene Grimaldi – mastering engineering, studio personnel
- Trevor Lyle Muzzy – mix engineering, studio personnel
- Nicolas De La Espriella – programming
- Carlos Fernando Lopez – recording engineering, studio personnel
- Jan Holzner – recording engineering, studio personnel
- Nicolás Ramírez – recording engineering, studio personnel

== Charts ==
=== Weekly charts ===
Chart (2019)	Peak position
Argentina (Argentina Hot 100)	43
Bolivia (Monitor Latino)	12
Colombia (National-Report)	22
Costa Rica (Monitor Latino)	1
Ecuador (National-Report)	3
El Salvador (Monitor Latino)	1
Euro Digital Song Sales (Billboard)	6
Guatemala (Monitor Latino)	1
Mexico (Billboard Mexican Airplay)	4
Nicaragua (Monitor Latino)	1
Panama (Monitor Latino)	1
Paraguay (SGP)	35
Spain (PROMUSICAE)	22
Uruguay (Monitor Latino)	12
US Latin Digital Songs (Billboard)	10
Venezuela (National-Report)	20

=== Year-end charts ===
Chart (2019)	Position
Argentina Airplay (Monitor Latino)	15

Chart (2020)	Position
Argentina Airplay (Monitor Latino)	48

== Certifications ==
Region	Certification	Certified units/sales
Brazil (Pro-Música Brasil)	Gold	20,000^{‡}
Spain (Promusicae)	3× Platinum	180,000^{‡}
United States (RIAA)	Gold (Latin)	30,000^{‡}
^{‡} Sales+streaming figures based on certification alone.

== Release history ==
Release dates and formats for "Mi Persona Favorita"
Region	Date	Format	Label	Version	Ref.
Various	28 March 2019	Digital download; streaming	Universal	Original	
Various	6 December 2019	Digital download; streaming	Universal	Live	

== See also ==
- List of number-one singles of 2019 (Spain)
