= Juanjo Domínguez =

Argentine musician (1951–2019)

- Born: October 23, 1951; Junín, Buenos Aires
- Died: February 10, 2019 (aged 67)
- Genres: Classical, tango
- Occupation: Musician
- Instrument: Guitar

Juanjo Domínguez (October 23, 1951 – February 10, 2019) was an Argentine classical guitarist and important interpreter of Argentine music, especially tango. In 2005, he was awarded the Konex Award for best instrumental single artist of popular music.

Dominguez was a true virtuoso of the guitar. His double scales, his tremolos in three strings (invented by himself when studying the Memories of the Alhambra (Recuerdos de La Alhambra) of the master Francisco Tárrega (1852-1909) it seemed to him that making the tremolo in a single string limited the sound), his speed comparable to that of an arch instrument and its high level of improvisation make it a unique guitarist. He declared having taken his inspiration from the famous Paraguayan counterpart Agustín Barrios (1885-1944). This was also a remarkable improviser (like all the great musicians of antiquity) and was a «mold» for the construction of his technique.
