= No Tengo Nada =

Single by Alejandro Sanz

from the album #ElDisco
- Language: Spanish
- English title: "I Have Nothing"
- Released: 30 November 2018
- Genre: Latin pop
- Length: 3:45
- Label: Universal Music Spain
- Songwriter: Alejandro Sanz
- Producers: Alejandro Sanz; Alfonso Pérez; Julio Reyes Copello

Alejandro Sanz singles chronology
"Llueve Alegría" (2018)	"No Tengo Nada" (2018)	"Back in the City" (2019)

Music video
- "No Tengo Nada" on YouTube

"No Tengo Nada" is a song by Spanish singer Alejandro Sanz. It was released on November 30, 2018 by Universal Music Spain as the lead single from Sanz's twelfth studio album #ElDisco (2019). The song reached the top 10 in Costa Rica and Uruguay.

== Music video ==
The music video of the song was released on 29 November 2018.

== Charts ==
Chart (2018)	Peak position
Argentina (Argentina Hot 100)	70
Costa Rica (Monitor Latino)	5
Spain (Promusicae)	19
Uruguay (Monitor Latino)	7

== Release history ==
Region	Date	Format	Label
Various	30 November 2018	Digital download; streaming	Universal Music Spain
