= 2011 Viña del Mar International Song Festival =

- Directed by: Juan Pablo González
- Presented by: Rafael Araneda; Eva Gómez
- Country of origin: Chile

Production
- Producers: Pablo Morales; Claudio Cabezas; Antonio Vodanovic
- Production locations: Viña del Mar, Chile
- Running time: 270 minutes

Original release
- Network: Chilevisión
- Release: February 21 – February 26, 2011

The Viña del Mar International Song Festival 2011 was released from February 21, 2011 until Saturday February 26, 2011. The musical event was broadcast for first time via Chilean TV channel Chilevisión.

== Licitation ==
The new tender for the festival, was awarded to Chilean television channel Chilevisión, which submitted a bid to 1,316,368 UF, equivalent to $28,565,238,082 (CLP), and $52,383,668.40 (USD). The other offers Delivered by the other two interested TV channels were: Mega with 60,888 UF, equivalent to $1,321,272,028 (CLP), and $2,422,982.63 (USD) and TVN with 862,112 UF, equivalent to $18,707,864,771 (CLP), and $34,306,963.65 (USD). Finally, the international festival was committed to Chilevisión for the next four years, until 2014.

== Development ==
On July 1, 2010, Vicente Sabatini was the tentative director of the event but Alex Hernández was later confirmed, and the pre-party show will be released on February 18, 2011 in Viña del Mar. The first artists who have contacted by the organizing committee to form part of the show are the Puerto Rican Latin pop singer Chayanne which his song "Me Enamoré de Ti" from his album No Hay Imposibles peaked at number-one for one week in the Chilean singles chart, during 2010 and archived a gold certification in the country for the sales of the record, and Brazilian Roberto Carlos, both have already been presented in this stage in previous editions. Bon Jovi is another artist who is in negotiations, which schedule a concert in Santiago in late 2010.

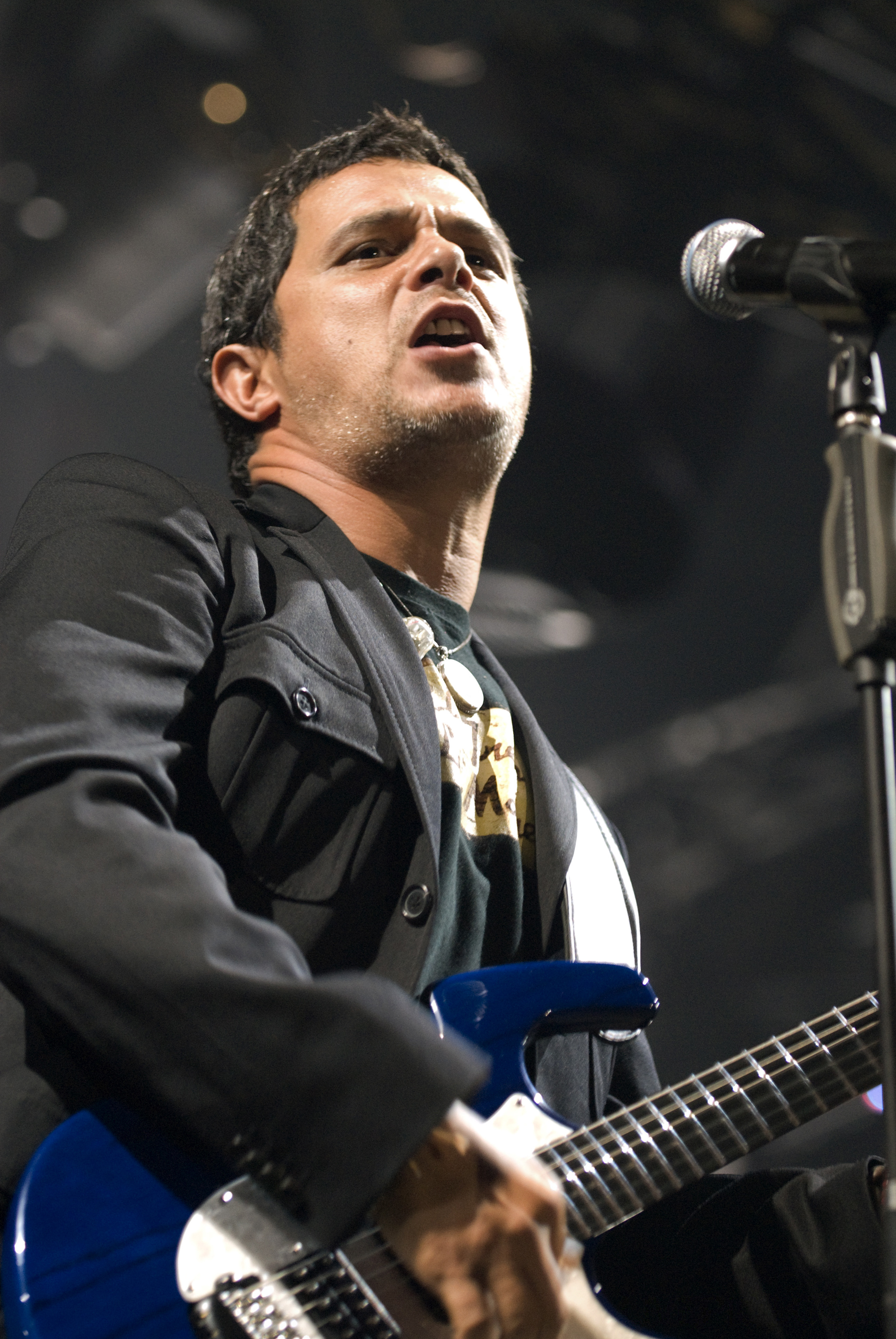
Alejandro Sanz is the first perfmormer confirmed for the main show.

Ricky Martin, Peter Cetera, former lead singer and bassist of Chicago, Argentine rocker Andrés Calamaro and teen pop sensation and success of ticket sales in her concerts in Chile, Demi Lovato are the next names in the tentative list of performers for the main show.

On July 4, 2010, Pablo Morales, content manager of the organizing committee, developed a list of the first artists who will be shuffled to the show, inside of which is composed of the above names, together with them, topped the list by the teen idol Justin Bieber, who with his album My Worlds debuted at the first position of the best-selling albums in Chile and where it appears his single "Baby" featuring Ludacris, a song which topped the Chilean singles chart for two consecutive weeks. Along with Bieber, the Spanish and multi-platinum singer Julio Iglesias, Juanes and Ana Gabriel.

On August 3, 2010, the Spanish singer Alejandro Sanz was added to priority list thanks to success of his latest album Paraíso Express, which peaked at number ten in Chile, his singles from that album "Looking for Paradise" topped the Chilean charts and "Desde Cuándo" reached Top 5, on August later Sanz was confirmed as the first main artist to be performing, he also confirmed that the show in Viña del Mar will be his last date for the international tour Paraíso Express. Diego Torres also appears in the priority list, his single "Guapa" peaked at top position in Chile for two consecutive weeks during May 2010. Chilean rock band Lucybell told in an interview with La Tercera that they are in conversations to be in the main show festival, also they released the album Fénix on early August which debuted at number two in Chile.

On August 20, 2010, the Mexican singer and actress Yuri was confirmed as judge for the international competition, along with the former member of Sin Bandera, Noel Schajris. Marco Antonio Solís was confirmed too as part of the main show and he is the socond act in the line-up, he performed in its stage two-times before.

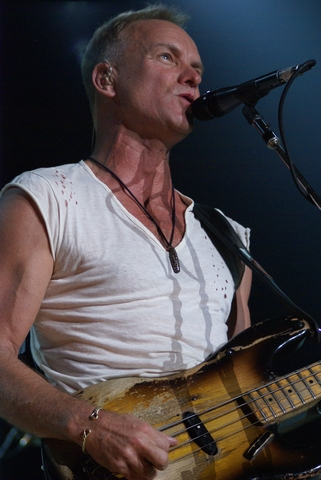
Sting will be performing for the second time in the festival.

Calle 13, Lionel Richie and Phil Collins are in tentative list of the festival. Another who comes to the event is Michael Bublé. The Canadian was asked to perform at the Quinta Vergara, but the intention of the Festival team is also involved in the pre-gala to be held in the Casino of the city and will be broadcast live. On September 9, 2010, during the release of Yo Soy, third solo studio album from Chilean tropical singer Américo, his manager confirmed that the negotiations are advanced for the artist returns to the stage of Viña del Mar.

On September 24, 2010, Puerto Rican Latin pop singer Chayanne was confirmed as the third musician to perform in the show, this performance will be his seventh time in the music show and is the second artist that performed more times only behind Miguel Bosé with eight times. The 2010 press tour for the event was confirmed be held between 18 and October 25 for different cities of United States, like Miami, Las Vegas and Los Angeles.

On November 3, 2010, performances by the Chilean Tropical singer Américo and Dominican-American bachata music group Aventura were officially confirmed as part of the main show. On December 6, 2010, Brazilian singer Roberto Carlos, American rapper Pitbull, Calle 13, along with Carlos Baute and Marta Sánchez were confirmed for the main show. On December 10, 2010, English musician and The Police former member Sting is added to the international line up for the event, he has performed in this festival along with his band The Police during the 1982 edition.

On February 18, was broadcast live the red carpet for the official presentation event of the festival from the Casino de Viña del Mar. The transmission gained an audience of 2.8 million viewers and was the most watched of the week in the country.

=== Hosts ===
In Chilevisión have analyzed the possibility of the Chilean former Miss Universe Cecilia Bolocco with Spanish singer Miguel Bosé as hosts for the event. The TV station has time limit to announce the hosts of the show until October 2010, another name which is also in negotiations is Rafael Araneda. Araneda would have made a contract proposal for 200 million Chilean pesos (400,000 dollars) to host the festival this year and the next three issues.

On November 3, 2010, Rafael Araneda was confirmed as host of the event. On December 6, 2010 Eva Gómez was confirmed as the co-host.

== Confirmed performers ==
- Alejandro Sanz
- Marco Antonio Solís
- Chayanne
- Américo
- Aventura
- Los Jaivas
- Roberto Carlos
- Pitbull
- Calle 13
- Sting
- Luis Véliz
- Villa Cariño

== Judges ==
- Yuri
- Noel Schajris
- Carlos Baute
- Jordi Castell
- Fernanda Urrejola
- Alvaro Morales
- Tito Fernández
- Juan Salazar
- Pablo Aguilera

== Chronology ==
=== Day 1 ===
Artist	Show/Songs Performed	Notes	Recognitions	Rating
Luis Véliz (Third place of Chilean Got Talent)	● "Caballito Blanco" ● "Por Ti Volaré"	Overture of the musical event, includes a tribute to the victims of the 8.8-magnitude earthquake occurred in Chile a year ago, which caused the suspension of last night's last edition of this festival. This tribute featured Víctor "Zafrada" Diaz, child known for his story of survival of the tsunami, who sang "Caballito Blanco" with Martina Maturana (young heroine in the tsunami on the Juan Fernández Islands).		39.8 Viewers: 4 million
Roberto Carlos	● "Un Millón de Amigos" (Intro) ● "Emociones" ● "Qué Será De Ti" ● "Cama y Mesa" ● "Detalles" ● "La Paz De Tu Sonrisa" ● "Lady Laura" ● "Yo Te Propongo" ● "Cóncavo y Convexo" ● "El Gato Que Está Triste y Azul" ● "Cabalgata" ● "El Día Que Me Quieras" ● "La Distancia" ● "Amigo" ● "Jesucristo" ● "Un Millón de Amigos"	He performs in the festival for second time in the history, the song "Detalles" was performed in an acoustic version. "Cabalgata" and "Jesucristo" were the only songs sung on the show in entire Portuguese. Roberto covered "El Día Que Me Quieras" by Carlos Gardel.	● Silver Torch ● Golden Torch ● Silver Seagull	39.8 Viewers: 4 million
Dino Gordillo	● Humoristic show	Gordillo acts for sixth time in this stage, his routine was the night audience peak with 50.3 and 5 million viewers.	● Silver Torch ● Golden Torch	39.8 Viewers: 4 million
Yuri	● "Baile Caliente" ● "Amiga Mía" ● "Todo Mi Corazón" ● "Hombres Al Borde De Un Ataque" ● "Esperanzas" ● "Arrepentida" ● "Este Amor Ya No Se Toca" ● "Dame Un Beso" ● "Tú y Yo" ● "Yo Te Amo Te Amo" ● "Es Ella Más Que Yo" ● "¿Qué Te Pasa?" ● "Corazón Necesito Amor" ● "Hay Un Límite" ● "La Maldita Primavera"	The last time she performed at the festival was 15 years ago, she also used in one of the interludes the song "La Copa de La Vida" by Ricky Martin. Yuri's Chilean husband band Aleste performed their hit single "Hay Un Límite" with her, but the performance had serious audio problems.	● Silver Torch ● Golden Torch ● Silver Seagull	39.8 Viewers: 4 million

=== Day 2 ===
Artist	Show/Songs Performed	Notes	Recognitions	Rating
Américo	● "Entre El Amor y El Odio" ● "Me Olvidé De Tu Amor" ● "Adiós Amor" ● "Tu Hipocresía" ● "Ten Pena Por Ti" ● "Tendría Que Llorar Por Ti" ● "A Prueba De Balas" ● "A Llorar a Otra Parte" ● "Traicionera" ● "Murió La Flor" ● "La Joya Del Pacífico" ● "Me Enamoré De Ti y Qué" ● "Lástima Por Ti" ● "Amigo Salud" ● "Niña Ay" ● "El Embrujo" ● "Te Vas" ● "Que Levante La Mano" ● "Como Te Voy A Olvidar"	He began his presentation with an instrumental medley of his greatest hits, Américo performed a tribute to Lucho Barrios, singing "La Joya Del Pacifico" and including a couple of children's dancers. During the show he plays various instruments like drums. He sang "Niña Ay" in a folklore version with a Charango in the musicalization and covered in the final the hit song "Como Te Voy A Olvidar" by Los Angeles Azules. His performance gained the most viewed moment of the night with 57.1 rating points and almost 6 million in audience.	● Silver Torch ● Golden Torch ● Silver Seagull	40.6 Viewers: 4.1 million
Óscar Gangas	● Humoristic show		● Silver Torch ● Golden Torch	40.6 Viewers: 4.1 million
Aventura	● "Por Un Segundo" ● "El Désprecio" ● "Peligro" ● "Su Veneno" ● "Los Infieles" ● "¿Quién Te Cambió? ● "Cuando Volverás" ● "Te Invito" ● "El Perdedor" ● "Tu Jueguito" ● "Noche de Sexo" ● "Hermanita" ● "Romeo y Julieta" ● "Amor De Madre" ● "Enséñame A Olvidar" ● "Yo Quisiera Amarla" ● "Mi Corazoncito" ● "La Boda" ● "Obsesión"	For the first time the group performed in the festival, they performed their featured single "Noche de Sexo" by Wisin & Yandel. They're the first act to receive gold seagull in the event and their presentation was extended after the end of the telecast.	● Silver Torch ● Golden Torch ● Silver Seagull ● Golden Seagull	40.6 Viewers: 4.1 million

=== Day 3 ===
Artist	Show/Songs Performed	Notes	Recognitions	Rating
Andrés Olivos of Difuntos Correa	● "Por Ese Palpitar" ● "Sus Ojos Se Cerraron" ● "Una Muchacha y Una Guitarra"	Opening night with a tribute to singer Sandro, and his widow, Olga Mary Garaventa was present in the audience during the tribute.		38.9 Viewers: 3.9 million
Camila Silva (Winner of Chilean Got Talent)	● "Por Ese Palpitar" ● "Sus Ojos Se Cerraron" ● "Una Muchacha y Una Guitarra"	Opening night with a tribute to singer Sandro, and his widow, Olga Mary Garaventa was present in the audience during the tribute.		38.9 Viewers: 3.9 million
Marco Antonio Solís	● "Dios Bendiga Nuestro Amor" ● "Si Te Pudiera Mentir" ● "Morenita" ● "Sigue Sin Mi" ● "O Me Voy o Te Vas" ● "¿Cómo Fui A Enamorarme De Ti?" ● "Nada Que Me Recuerde a Tí" ● "Mi Eterno Amor Secreto" ● "La Venia Bendita" ● "Invéntame" ● "Tú Me Vuelves Loco" ● "Tú Carcel" ● "Cuando Te Acuerdes De Mi" ● "Antes de Que Te Vayas" ● "Más Que Tu Amigo" ● "Si No Te Hubieras Ido" ● "Dónde Estará Mi Primavera"	This is the fourth time in this festival. Solís also performed during his show the song "¿Cómo Fui A Enamorarme De Ti?" from his former band Los Bukis.	● Silver Torch ● Golden Torch ● Silver Seagull	38.9 Viewers: 3.9 million
Mauricio Flores	● Humoristic show		● Silver Torch ● Golden Torch	38.9 Viewers: 3.9 million
Calle 13	● "Baile de los Pobres" ● "No Hay Nadie Como Tú" ● "Vamo' a Portarnos Mal" ● "Ven y Critícame" ● "Atrévete-te-te" ● "Latinoamérica" ● "La Cumbia de los Aburridos" ● "Todo Se Mueve" ● "Tango del Pecado" ● "La Bala" ● "Se Vale To' To'" ● "Hormiga Brava" ● "Pa'l Norte" ● "Calma Pueblo" ● "Fiesta de Locos"	They performed with various Chilean music acts, like Chancho en Piedra in "No Hay Nadie Como Tú", Inti-Illimani and Camila Moreno in "Latinoamérica". Audience sang to Residente "Happy Birthday" during the performance. Residente Criticized the routine of Mauricio Flores for making fun of gays and Américo controversy last night, Calle 13 vocalist said he would not accept awards.		38.9 Viewers: 3.9 million

=== Day 4 ===
Artist	Show/Songs Performed	Notes	Recognitions	Rating
Chayanne	● "Provócame" ● "Lola" ● "Un Siglo Sin Ti" ● "Tu Boca" ● "Guajira" ● "Palo Bonito" ● "Fiesta En América" ● "Atado a Tu Amor" ● "Tu Pirata Soy Yo" ● "Completamente Enamorados" ● "Baila Baila" ● "Tiempo de Vals" ● "Lo Déjaria Todo" ● "Salomé" ● "Si Nos Quedara Poco Tiempo" ● "Me Enamoré De Ti" ● "Torero" ● "Cuidarte El Alma"	He is the second artist winning a Golden Seagull this year in the festival.	● Silver Torch ● Golden Torch ● Silver Seagull ● Golden Seagull	33.7 Viewers: 3.4 million
Carlos Baute	● "Te Regalo" ● "Te Quise Olvidar" ● "Tu No Sabes Que Tanto" ● "Quien Te Quiere Como Yo" ● "Colgando En Tus Manos"	Baute sang "Te Quise Olvidar" written by him but originally performed by MDO.	● Silver Torch	33.7 Viewers: 3.4 million
Pitbull	● "Can't Stop Me Now" ● "Bojangles" ● "Blanco" ● "Watagatapitusberry" ● "Shooting Star" ● "I'm in Miami Bitch" ● "Shut It Down" ● "Hey Baby (Drop It to the Floor)" ● "Culo" ● "I Know You Want Me (Calle Ocho)" ● "Tonight (I'm Fuckin' You)"/"I Like It" ● "Maldito Alcohol" ● "The Anthem" ● "DJ Got Us Falling In Love" ● "Hotel Room Service" ● "Bon, Bon"	He used various songs as interludes like "Smells Like Teen Spirit" by Nirvana, "I Gotta Feeling" by The Black Eyed Peas.	● Silver Torch ● Golden Torch	33.7 Viewers: 3.4 million

=== Day 5 ===
Artist	Show/Songs Performed	Notes	Recognitions	Rating
Sting	● "If I Ever Lose My Faith in You" ● "Every Little Thing She Does Is Magic" ● "Englishman in New York" ● "Roxanne" ● "This Cowboy Song" ● "When We Dance" ● "Russians" ● "Fields of Gold" ● "Next to You" ● "They Dance Alone" ● "King of Pain" ● "Every Breath You Take" ● "She's Too Good For Me" ● "Message in a Bottle"	Accompanied by the Symphony Orchestra of Chile (Orquesta Sinfónica de Chile)	● Silver Torch ● Golden Torch ● Silver Seagull ● Golden Seagull	29.4 Viewers: 2.9 million
Ricardo Meruane	● Humoristic show	During his routine was booed by the audience and could not finish.		29.4 Viewers: 2.9 million
Los Jaivas	● "Del Aire al Aire" ● "La Poderosa Muerte" ● "Amor Americano" ● "Sube a Nacer Conmigo Hermano" ● "Final" ● "Valparaíso" ● "Mira Niñita" ● "Hijos de La Tierra" ● "Mambo de Machaguay" ● "Pregón Para Iluminarse" ●"Todos Juntos"		● Silver Torch ● Golden Torch ● Silver Seagull ● Golden Seagull	29.4 Viewers: 2.9 million

=== Day 6 ===
Artist	Show/Songs Performed	Notes	Recognitions	Rating
Alejandro Sanz	● "Peter Punk" ● "Lo Que Fui Es Lo Que Soy" ● "Desde Cuando" ● "Viviendo de Prisa" ● "Nuestro Amor Será Leyenda" ● "Corazón Partío" ● "Cuando Nadie Me Ve" ● "Lola Soledad" ● "Quisiera Ser" ● "Mala" ● "No Es Lo Mismo" ● "Looking for Paradise" ● "Pasadoble" ● "Tú No Tienes la Culpa" ● "Tu Letra Podré Acariciar" ● "A la Primera Persona" ● "Mi Soledad y Yo" ● "Amiga Mía" ● "¿Y Si Fuera Ella?" ● "Aquello Que Me Diste"	Sanz dedicated to Chile, the song "Corazón Partío" for the anniversary of the 8.8-magnitude earthquake that affected the country. In the song "Lola Soledad", he invited singer Noel Schajris to do a duet.	● Silver Torch ● Golden Torch ● Silver Seagull ● Golden Seagull	27.0 Viewers: 2.7 million
Noel Schajris	● "Momentos" ● "Kilómetros" ● "Sirena" ● "ABC" ● "Que Me Alcance la Vida" ● "Mientes Tan Bien" ● "Que Lloro" ● "Te Vi Venir" ● "No Veo la Hora" ● "Aquí Estoy Yo"	He performed songs from his solo career, former duet Sin Bandera and his collaboration with Luis Fonsi, "Aquí Estoy Yo".	● Silver Torch ● Golden Torch	27.0 Viewers: 2.7 million
Villa Cariño	● ● ●			27.0 Viewers: 2.7 million
Los Vikings 5	● ● ●	El Minero	Pene	27.0 Viewers: 2.7 million

== Participants ==
=== International competition ===
Country	Song	Artist	Composer
Winner
Canada	"Try Anything"	Sierra Noble	Sierra Noble, Christopher Ward, Chris Burke-Gaffney
Finalists
Chile	"Mágica"	Eric	Jaime Ciero
Peru	"Destrozado Y Sin Control"	Shaw	Francisco Murias
Other participants
United States	"Love's A Boomerang"	Aleesha (film)	Johnny Elkins, Peter Roberts
Panama	"Mi Sangre Es rumba"	Danny Ricardo	Danny Ricardo
Ukraine	"My Sdeladi Eto"	A.R.M.I.Y.A.	Larysa Arkhypenko, Vitaly Volkomor

=== Folk competition ===
Country	Song	Artist	Composer
Winner
Chile	"De Pascua Lama"	Valentina Sepúlveda	Patricio Manns
Finalists
Bolivia	"Wawitay"	Rocío del Carmen Moreira	Javier Antonio Mantilla
Colombia	"Entre Líneas"	Andrea Botero	Juan Vicente Zambrano, Marcela Cardenas, Andrea Botero
Other participants
Honduras	"Magdalena Se Me Va"	Luis Fernando Bustillo Osorio	Cristián Alan Kafie Larach
Ecuador	"Baila Mi Vida"	Fausto Miño	Fausto Miño
Peru	"Vamos Bailando"	Fritzia Hualpa Alarcón	Gerald Paul Rivera Alvarez
