= List of awards and nominations received by Alejandro Sanz =

Alejandro Sanz awards and nominations
- Sanz in 2017
Awards and nominations
| Award | Wins | Nominations |
| Billboard Latin Music Award | 6 | 15 |
| Billboard Music Award | 1 | 1 |
| Goya Awards | 0 | 1 |
| Grammy Awards | 4 | 7 |
| Latin Grammy Awards | 24 | 52 |
| Lo Nuestro Awards | 4 | 35 |
| Los 40 Music Awards | 10 | 25 |
| MTV VMAs | 1 | 6 |
| MTV VMAs Latinoamérica | 2 | 14 |

Totals (Note: Certain award groups do not simply award one winner. They acknowledge several different recipients, have runners-up, and have third place. Since this is a specific recognition and is different from losing an award, runner-up mentions are considered wins in this award tally. For simplification and to avoid errors, each award in this list has been presumed to have had a prior nomination.)
- Wins: 106
- Nominations: 254

This is a list of awards and nominations received by Alejandro Sanz, a Spanish singer and songwriter. He is winner of four Grammy Awards, twentyfour Latin Grammy Awards, six Billboard Latin Music Awards, four Lo Nuestro Awards, ten Los 40 Music Awards and one MTV Video Music Awards.

== Awards and nominations ==
=== Grammy Awards ===
| Year | Category | Nominated Work | Result | Ref. |
|---|---|---|---|---|
| 2001 | Best Latin Pop Album | El Alma Al Aire | Nominated | |
| 2004 | Best Latin Pop Album | No Es Lo Mismo | Won | |
| 2008 | Best Latin Pop Album | El Tren De Los Momentos | Won | |
| 2011 | Best Latin Pop Album | Paraiso Express | Won | |
| 2016 | Best Latin Pop Album | Sirope | Nominated | |
| 2020 | Best Latin Pop Album | #Eldisco | Won | |
| 2026 | Best Latin Pop Album | ¿Y ahora qué? | Nominated | |

=== Latin Grammy Awards ===
| Year | Category | Nominated Work | Result | Ref. |
|---|---|---|---|---|
| 2001 | Album of the Year | El Alma Al Aire | Won | |
| 2001 | Best Male Pop Vocal Album | El Alma Al Aire | Won | |
| 2001 | Record of the Year | "El Alma Al Aire" | Won | |
| 2001 | Song of the Year | "El Alma Al Aire" | Won | |
| 2001 | Best Music Video | "Cuando Nadie Me Ve" | Nominated | |
| 2002 | Album of the Year | MTV Unplugged | Won | |
| 2002 | Record of the Year | "Y Solo Se Me Ocurre Amarte" | Won | |
| 2002 | Song of the Year | "Y Solo Se Me Ocurre Amarte" | Won | |
| 2004 | Song of the Year | "No Es Lo Mismo" | Won | |
| 2004 | Record of the Year | "No Es Lo Mismo" | Won | |
| 2004 | Album of the Year | No Es Lo Mismo | Won | |
| 2004 | Best Male Pop Vocal Album | No Es Lo Mismo | Won | |
| 2005 | Song of the Year | "Tu No Tienes Alma" | Won | |
| 2005 | Record of the Year | "Tu No Tienes Alma" | Won | |
| 2006 | Record of the Year | "La Tortura" (with Shakira) | Won | |
| 2006 | Best Short Form Music Video | "La Tortura" (with Shakira) | Nominated | |
| 2007 | Album of the Year | El Tren De Los Momentos | Nominated | |
| 2010 | Album of the Year | Paraíso Express | Nominated | |
| 2010 | Best Male Pop Vocal Album | Paraíso Express | Won | |
| 2010 | Record of the Year | "Desde Cuando" | Nominated | |
| 2010 | Song of the Year | "Desde Cuando" | Nominated | |
| 2011 | Best Long Form Music Video | Canciones Para Un Paraíso - En Vivo | Nominated | |
| 2012 | Record of the Year | "No Me Compares" | Nominated | |
| 2012 | Song of the Year | "No Me Compares" | Nominated | |
| 2013 | Song of the Year | "Mi Marciana" | Nominated | |
| 2013 | Record of the Year | "Mi Marciana" | Nominated | |
| 2013 | Album of the Year | La Música No Se Toca | Nominated | |
| 2013 | Best Contemporary Pop Vocal Album | La Música No Se Toca | Won | |
| 2015 | Best Contemporary Pop Vocal Album | Sirope | Won | |
| 2015 | Album of the Year | Sirope | Nominated | |
| 2015 | Record of the Year | "Un Zombie a la Intemperie" | Nominated | |
| 2015 | Song of the Year | "Un Zombie a la Intemperie" | Nominated | |
| 2016 | Best Long Form Music Video | Sirope Vivo | Won | |
| 2019 | Best Long Form Music Video | Lo Que Fui Es Lo Que Soy | Won | |
| 2019 | Album of the Year | #Eldisco | Nominated | |
| 2019 | Best Contemporary Pop Vocal Album | #Eldisco | Nominated | |
| 2019 | Record of the Year | "No Tengo Nada" | Nominated | |
| 2019 | Song of the Year | "No Tengo Nada" | Nominated | |
| 2019 | Song of the Year | "Mi Persona Favorita" (with Camila Cabello) | Nominated | |
| 2019 | Best Pop Song | "Mi Persona Favorita" (with Camila Cabello) | Won | |
| 2019 | Record of the Year | "Mi Persona Favorita" (with Camila Cabello) | Won | |
| 2020 | Record of the Year | "Contigo" | Won | |
| 2020 | Song of the Year | "For Sale" (with Carlos Vives) | Nominated | |
| 2020 | Song of the Year | "#ElMundoFuera (Improvisación)" | Nominated | |
| 2022 | Album of the Year | Sanz | Nominated | |
| 2023 | Song of the Year | "NASA" | Nominated | |
| 2023 | Record of the Year | "Correcaminos" | Nominated | |
| 2025 | Record of the Year | "Palmeras en el Jardín" | Won | |
| 2025 | Song of the Year | "Palmeras en el Jardín" | Nominated | |
| 2025 | Album of the Year | ¿Y Ahora Qué? | Nominated | |
| 2025 | Best Contemporary Pop Album | ¿Y Ahora Qué? | Won | |
| 2026 | Best Contemporary Pop Album | ¿Y Ahora Qué +? | Won | |

=== Other awards and honors ===
| Award | Year | Category | Nominated Work | Result | Ref. |
|---|---|---|---|---|---|
| ASCAP Latin Awards | 2011 | Latin Heritage Award | Himslef | Honored | |
| Billboard Latin Music Awards | 1999 | Latin Dance Maxi-Single of the Year | "Corazón Partío" | Nominated | |
| Billboard Latin Music Awards | 2003 | Latin Pop Album Of The Year, Male | MTV Unplugged | Nominated | |
| Billboard Latin Music Awards | 2004 | Latin Pop Album Of The Year, Male | No Es Lo Mismo | Nominated | |
| Billboard Latin Music Awards | 2005 | Latin Touring Artist of the Year | Himself | Nominated | |
| Billboard Latin Music Awards | 2006 | Hot Latin Song of the Year | "La Tortura" (with Shakira) | Won | |
| Billboard Latin Music Awards | 2006 | Latin Ringtone of the Year | "La Tortura" (with Shakira) | Won | |
| Billboard Latin Music Awards | 2006 | Latin Vocal Duet or Collaboration | "La Tortura" (with Shakira) | Won | |
| Billboard Latin Music Awards | 2006 | Latin Vocal Duo or Group | Alejandro Sanz and Shakira | Won | |
| Billboard Latin Music Awards | 2008 | Hot Latin Song of the Year, Vocal Event | "Te Lo Agradezco, Pero No" (with Shakira) | Nominated | |
| Billboard Latin Music Awards | 2010 | Hot Latin Song of the Year, Vocal Event | "Looking for Paradise " (with Alicia Keys) | Won | |
| Billboard Latin Music Awards | 2011 | Latin Touring Artist of the Year | Himself | Nominated | |
| Billboard Latin Music Awards | 2013 | Latin Pop Albums Artist of the Year, Solo | Himself | Nominated | |
| Billboard Latin Music Awards | 2013 | Latin Pop Album of the Year | La Música No Se Toca | Nominated | |
| Billboard Latin Music Awards | 2024 | Lifetime Achievement Award | Himself | Honored | |
| Billboard Latin Music Awards | 2026 | Latin Pop Song of the Year | "El Vino de Tu Boca" (with Carín León) | Pending | |
| Billboard Music Awards | 2005 | Latin Single of the Year | "La Tortura" (with Shakira) | Won | |
| Goya Awards | 2021 | Best Original Song | "El verano que vivimos" (from The Summer We Lived) | Nominated | |
| International Dance Music Awards | 2006 | Best Latin Track | "La Tortura" (with Shakira) | Won | |
| Lo Nuestro Awards | 1996 | Video of the Year | "La Fuerza del Corazón" | Nominated | |
| Lo Nuestro Awards | 1998 | Video of the Year | "Corazón Partío" | Nominated | |
| Lo Nuestro Awards | 1999 | Male Artist of the Year, Pop | Himself | Nominated | |
| Lo Nuestro Awards | 1999 | Pop Song of the Year | "Corazón Partío" | Nominated | |
| Lo Nuestro Awards | 2003 | Pop Album of the Year | MTV Unplugged | Nominated | |
| Lo Nuestro Awards | 2004 | Video of the Year | "No Es lo Mismo" | Nominated | |
| Lo Nuestro Awards | 2005 | Video of the Year | "Try to Save Your S’ong" | Nominated | |
| Lo Nuestro Awards | 2006 | Song of the Year | "La Tortura" (with Shakira) | Won | |
| Lo Nuestro Awards | 2006 | Group or Duo of the YearSong of the Year | "La Tortura" (with Shakira) | Won | |
| Lo Nuestro Awards | 2008 | Album of the Year | El Tren de los Momentos | Nominated | |
| Lo Nuestro Awards | 2011 | Best Male Artist | Himself | Nominated | |
| Lo Nuestro Awards | 2011 | Collaboration Video of the Year | "Looking for Paradise" (with Alicia Keys) | Nominated | |
| Lo Nuestro Awards | 2011 | Album of the Year | Paraíso Express | Nominated | |
| Lo Nuestro Awards | 2013 | Pop Male Artist of the Year | Himself | Won | |
| Lo Nuestro Awards | 2013 | Video of the Year | "No Me Compares" | Nominated | |
| Lo Nuestro Awards | 2013 | Album of the Year | La Música No Se Toca | Nominated | |
| Lo Nuestro Awards | 2014 | Artist of the Year | Himself | Nominated | |
| Lo Nuestro Awards | 2014 | Pop Male Artist of the Year | Himself | Nominated | |
| Lo Nuestro Awards | 2014 | Pop Song of the Year | "No Me Compares" | Nominated | |
| Lo Nuestro Awards | 2014 | Pop Song of the Year | "Mi Marciana" | Nominated | |
| Lo Nuestro Awards | 2014 | Video of the Year | "Mi Marciana" | Nominated | |
| Lo Nuestro Awards | 2016 | Video of the Year | "Un Zombie a la Intemperie" | Nominated | |
| Lo Nuestro Awards | 2016 | Pop/Rock Album of the Year | Sirope | Nominated | |
| Lo Nuestro Awards | 2017 | Pop Song of the Year | "No Soy Una de Esas" (with Jesse & Joy) | Nominated | |
| Lo Nuestro Awards | 2020 | Tour of the Year | #LaGiraTour | Nominated | |
| Lo Nuestro Awards | 2021 | Pop Collaboration of the Year | "For Sale" (with Carlos Vives) | Nominated | |
| Lo Nuestro Awards | 2021 | Video of the Year | "For Sale" (with Carlos Vives) | Nominated | |
| Lo Nuestro Awards | 2023 | Pop Song of the Year | "Un Beso En Madrid" (with Tini) | Nominated | |
| Lo Nuestro Awards | 2023 | Pop Collaboration of the Year | "Muero" (with Kany García) | Nominated | |
| Lo Nuestro Awards | 2023 | Pop/Ballad Song of the Year | "Muero" (with Kany García) | Nominated | |
| Lo Nuestro Awards | 2026 | Pop Male Artist of the Year | Himself | Nominated | |
| Lo Nuestro Awards | 2026 | The Perfect Mix of the Year | "El Vino De Tu Boca" (with Carín León) | Nominated | |
| Lo Nuestro Awards | 2026 | Pop Song of the Year | "Palmeras En El Jardín" | Nominated | |
| Lo Nuestro Awards | 2026 | Pop Collaboration of the Year | "Bésame" (with Shakira) | Won | |
| Lo Nuestro Awards | 2026 | Album of the Year | ¿Y Ahora Qué +? | Nominated | |
| Los 40 Music Awards | 2007 | Best Artist | Himself | Nominated | |
| Los 40 Music Awards | 2007 | Best Song | "Para Que Tu No Llores" (with Antonio Carmona) | Nominated | |
| Los 40 Music Awards | 2010 | Best Solo | Himself | Nominated | |
| Los 40 Music Awards | 2010 | Best Song | "Looking for Paradise " (with Alicia Keys) | Nominated | |
| Los 40 Music Awards | 2010 | Best Video | "Nuestro Amor Será Leyenda" | Nominated | |
| Los 40 Music Awards | 2010 | Best Album | Paraíso Express | Won | |
| Los 40 Music Awards | 2010 | Best Tour | Paraíso Express Tour | Won | |
| Los 40 Music Awards | 2012 | Best Solo | Himself | Nominated | |
| Los 40 Music Awards | 2012 | Best 21st Century's Spanish Artist | Himself | Honored | |
| Los 40 Music Awards | 2012 | Best Song | "Se Vende" | Nominated | |
| Los 40 Music Awards | 2012 | Best Video | "No Me Compares" | Won | |
| Los 40 Music Awards | 2012 | Best Album | La Música No Se Toca | Won | |
| Los 40 Music Awards | 2013 | Best Spanish Song | "Mi marciana" | Nominated | |
| Los 40 Music Awards | 2013 | Best Spanish Festival, Tour or Concert | Gira La música no se toca | Won | |
| Los 40 Music Awards | 2014 | Best Spanish Act | Himself | Nominated | |
| Los 40 Music Awards | 2015 | Best Spanish Act | Himself | Nominated | |
| Los 40 Music Awards | 2015 | Best Spanish Song | "Un zombie a la intemperie" | Nominated | |
| Los 40 Music Awards | 2015 | Best Video | "Un zombie a la intemperie" | Nominated | |
| Los 40 Music Awards | 2015 | Best Album | Sirope | Won | |
| Los 40 Music Awards | 2015 | Best Spanish Festival, Tour or Concert | Gira Sirope | Won | |
| Los 40 Music Awards | 2017 | Golden Music Awards | Himself | Honored | |
| Los 40 Music Awards | 2018 | Video of the Year | "Déjala que baile" (with Melendi) | Won | |
| Los 40 Music Awards | 2019 | Song of the Year | "Mi Persona Favoritae" (with Camila Cabello) | Nominated | |
| Los 40 Music Awards | 2019 | Best Spanish Festival, Tour or Concert | #LaGira | Nominated | |
| Los 40 Music Awards | 2025 | Best Collaboration | "Bésame" (with Shakira) | Nominated | |
| Lunas del Auditorio | 2002 | Balada Award | "El alma al aire" | Won | |
| Lunas del Auditorio | 2004 | Pop Award | Himself | Won | |
| MTV Europe Music Awards | 2001 | Best Spanish Act | Himself | Nominated | |
| MTV Europe Music Awards | 2003 | Best Spanish Act | Himself | Nominated | |
| MTV Europe Music Awards | 2015 | Best Spanish Act | Himself | Nominated | |
| MTV Video Music Awards | 2001 | International Viewer's Choice: MTV Latin America (North) | "El Alma al Aire" | Won | |
| MTV Video Music Awards | 2001 | International Viewer's Choice: MTV Latin America (South) | "El Alma al Aire" | Nominated | |
| MTV Video Music Awards | 2005 | Best Female Video | "La Tortura" (with Shakira) | Nominated | |
| MTV Video Music Awards | 2005 | Best Dance Video | "La Tortura" (with Shakira) | Nominated | |
| MTV Video Music Awards | 2005 | Viewer's Choice | "La Tortura" (with Shakira) | Nominated | |
| MTV Video Music Awards | 2013 | Best Latin | Himself | Nominated | |
| MTV Video Music Awards Latin America | 2002 | Artist of the Year | Himself | Nominated | |
| MTV Video Music Awards Latin America | 2002 | Best Male Artist | Himself | Nominated | |
| MTV Video Music Awards Latin America | 2002 | Best Pop Artist | Himself | Nominated | |
| MTV Video Music Awards Latin America | 2004 | Artist of the Year | Himself | Nominated | |
| MTV Video Music Awards Latin America | 2004 | Best Solo Artist | Himself | Nominated | |
| MTV Video Music Awards Latin America | 2004 | Best Pop Artist | Himself | Won | |
| MTV Video Music Awards Latin America | 2004 | Video of the Year | "No Es Lo Mismo" | Nominated | |
| MTV Video Music Awards Latin America | 2005 | Best Male Artist | Himself | Nominated | |
| MTV Video Music Awards Latin America | 2005 | Video of the Year | "La Tortura" (with Shakira) | Won | |
| MTV Video Music Awards Latin America | 2007 | Artist of the Year | Himself | Nominated | |
| MTV Video Music Awards Latin America | 2007 | Best Solo Artist | Himself | Nominated | |
| MTV Video Music Awards Latin America | 2007 | Best Pop Artist | Himself | Nominated | |
| MTV Video Music Awards Latin America | 2007 | Video of the Year | "Te Lo Agradezco, Pero No" (with Shakira) | Nominated | |
| MTV Video Music Awards Latin America | 2009 | Best Live Performance | "Looking for Paradise" | Nominated | |
| NRJ Music Awards | 2006 | International Song of the Year | "La Tortura" (with Shakira) | Won | |
| Premios Amigo | 1997 | Best Spanish Male Artist | Himself | Won | |
| Premios Amigo | 1998 | Premio Homenaje | Himself | Won | |
| Premios Amigo | 2000 | Best Spanish Male Artist | Himself | Won | |
| Premios Amigo | 2000 | Best Spanish Album | El alma al aire | Won | |
| Premios Amigo | 2003 | Best Spanish Male Artist | Himself | Won | |
| Premios Amigo | 2003 | Best Spanish Album | No es lo mism0 | Won | |
| Premios Amigo | 2003 | Best Music Video | "No es lo mismo" | Won | |
| Premios de la Academia de Música | 2025 | Best Pop Song | "Palmeras en el Jardín" | Nominated | |
| Premios de la Academia de Música | 2026 | Best Pop Tropical Album | ¿Y ahora que +? | Nominated | |
| Premios de la Música | 1998 | Best Pop Artist | Himself | Won | |
| Premios de la Música | 1998 | Best Songwriter | Himself | Won | |
| Premios de la Música | 1998 | Best Song | "Corazón partío" | Won | |
| Premios de la Música | 1998 | Best Video | "Corazón partío" | Won | |
| Premios de la Música | 1998 | Best Album | Más | Won | |
| Premios de la Música | 2001 | Best Pop Artist | Himself | Nominated | |
| Premios de la Música | 2001 | Best Pop Songwriter | Himself | Nominated | |
| Premios de la Música | 2001 | Best Album | El alma al aire | Nominated | |
| Premios de la Música | 2002 | Best Pop Artist | Himself | Won | |
| Premios de la Música | 2002 | Best Song | "Y sólo se me ocurre amarte" | Won | |
| Premios de la Música | 2002 | Best Pop Song | "Y sólo se me ocurre amarte" | Won | |
| Premios de la Música | 2002 | Best Video | "El alma al aire" | Won | |
| Premios de la Música | 2002 | Best Album | MTV Unplugged. | Won | |
| Premios de la Música | 2004 | Best Song | "No es lo mismo" | Won | |
| Premios de la Música | 2004 | Best Pop Song | "No es lo mismo" | Won | |
| Premios de la Música | 2004 | Best Video | "No es lo mismo" | Won | |
| Premios de la Música | 2004 | Best Album | No es lo mismo | Nominated | |
| Premios de la Música | 2004 | Best Pop Album | No es lo mismo | Won | |
| Premios de la Música | 2004 | Best Artistic Production | No es lo mismo | Nominated | |
| Premios de la Música | 2007 | Best Song | "A la primera persona" | Nominated | |
| Premios de la Música | 2007 | Best Video | "A la primera persona" | Nominated | |
| Premios de la Música | 2007 | Best Album | El tren de los momentos | Nominated | |
| Premios de la Música | 2007 | Best Sound | El tren de los momentos | Nominated | |
| Premios de la Música | 2007 | Best Artistic Production | El tren de los momentos | Nominated | |
| Premios de la Música | 2011 | Best Tour | Paraíso Tour | Won | |
| Premio Gardel | 1999 | Album of the Year | Más | Won | |
| Premio Gardel | 2001 | Male Artist of the Year | Himself | Won | |
| Premio Gardel | 2001 | Album of the Year | El alma al aire | Won | |
| Premio Gardel | 2002 | Male Artist of the Year | Himself | Won | |
| Premio Gardel | 2002 | Album of the Year | MTV Unplugged | Won | |
| Premio Gardel | 2021 | Best Duet or Collaboration | "Un beso en madrid" (with Tini) | Nominated | |
| Premios Juventud | 2005 | Catchiest Tune | "La Tortura" (with Shakira) | Won | |
| Premios Juventud | 2005 | Dynamic Duet | Alejandro Sanz and Shakira | Won | |
| Premios Juventud | 2007 | The Perfect Combo | "Te Lo Agradezco, Pero No" (with Shakira) | Nominated | |
| Premios Juventud | 2009 | The Perfect Combo | "Aquí Estoy Yo" (with Luis Fonsi) | Won | |
| Premios Juventud | 2009 | Best Ballad | "Aquí Estoy Yo" (with Luis Fonsi) | Nominated | |
| Premios Juventud | 2009 | Favorite Music Video | "Aquí Estoy Yo" (with Luis Fonsi) | Won | |
| Premios Juventud | 2013 | Best Soap Opera Song | "No Me Compares" | Nominated | |
| Premios Juventud | 2013 | Best Ballad | "No Me Compares" | Nominated | |
| Premios Juventud | 2016 | Mi Tuitero Favorito | Himself | Nominated | |
| Premios Juventud | 2017 | Best Song For Love | "Deja Que Te Bese" (with Marc Anthony) | Nominated | |
| Premios Juventud | 2020 | Best #StayHome Concert | #LaGiraSeQuedaEnCasa (with Juanes) | Nominated | |
| Premios Juventud | 2023 | Best Pop Mix | "Muero" (with Kany García) | Nominated | |
| Premios Juventud | 2025 | Best Pop/Ballad Song | "Palmeras En El Jardín" | Nominated | |
| Premios Juventud | 2025 | Best Tropical Mix | "Hoy No Me Siento Bien" | Nominated | |
| Premios Juventud | 2025 | Best Pop Album | ¿Y Ahora Qué? | Nominated | |
| Premios Juventud | 2026 | Best Euro-Song | "No Me Tires Flores" | Nominated | |
| Premios Juventud | 2026 | Best Pop/Rhythmic Song | "Las Guapas" | Nominated | |
| Premios Juventud | 2026 | Best Pop Song | "Bésame" (with Shakira) | Won | |
| Premios Juventud | 2026 | Best Pop Album | ¿Y Ahora Qué? | Nominated | |
| Premios Nuestra Tierra | 2026 | Best Pop Song | "Bésame" (with Shakira) | Nominated | |
| Premios Odeón | 2020 | Best Male Artist | Himself | Nominated | |
| Premios Odeón | 2020 | Best Music Video | "Mi Persona Favorita" (with Camila Cabello) | Nominated | |
| Premios Odeón | 2020 | Album of the Year | El Disco | Won | |
| Premios Odeón | 2022 | Best Pop Artist | Himself | Nominated | |
| Premios Odeón | 2022 | Album of the Year | Sanz | Nominated | |
| Premios Odeón | 2022 | Best Pop Album | Sanz | Won | |
| Premios Ondas | 2000 | Best Spanish Artist | Himself | Won | |
| Premios Ondas | 2000 | Best Album | El alma al aire | Won | |
| Premios Ondas | 2001 | Best Video | "El alma al aire" | Won | |
| Premios Ondas | 2003 | Best Spanish Artist or Group | Himself | Won | |
| Premios Ondas | 2003 | Best Song | "No es lo mismo" | Won | |
| Premios Ondas | 2010 | Best Spanish Artist or Group | Himself | Won | |
| Premios Ondas | 2010 | Best Song | "Looking for Paradise" | Won | |
| Premios Ondas | 2010 | Best Album | Paraíso Express | Won | |
| Premios Ondas | 2017 | Artist of the Year | Himself | Won | |
| Premios Oye! | 2002 | Spanish Male Pop Artist of the Year | Himslef | Won | |
| Premios Oye! | 2002 | Spanish Album of the Year | MTV Unplugged | Won | |
| Premios Oye! | 2007 | Spanish Male Pop Artist of the Year | Himslef | Nominated | |
| Premios Oye! | 2007 | Spanish Album of the Year | El tren de los momentos | Nominated | |
| Premios Oye! | 2007 | Best Spanish Song of the Year | "Te Lo Agradezco, Pero No" (with Shakira) | Won | |
| Premios Oye! | 2007 | Best Video | "A la primera persona" | Nominated | |
| Premios Oye! | 2013 | Artist of the Year | Himslef | Won | |
| Premios Oye! | 2013 | Spanish Male Pop Artist of the Year | Himslef | Won | |
| Premios Oye! | 2013 | Best Theme Song for a Telenovela | "No me compares" | Won | |
| Premios Oye! | 2013 | Song Artist of the Year | "No me compares" | Nominated | |
| Quiero Awards | 2012 | Best Melodic Video | "No me compares" | Nominated | |
| Quiero Awards | 2013 | Male Artist of the Year | Himself | Nominated | |
| Quiero Awards | 2013 | Video of the Year | "Camino de rosas" | Nominated | |
| Quiero Awards | 2013 | Best Melodic Video | "Camino de rosas" | Nominated | |
| Quiero Awards | 2013 | Best Video for Love | "Camino de rosas" | Nominated | |
| Quiero Awards | 2014 | Best Collaboration | "Víveme" (with Laura Pausini) | Nominated | |
| Quiero Awards | 2014 | Best Live Video | "Mi soledad y yo" | Nominated | |
| Quiero Awards | 2016 | Video of the Year | "No soy una de esas" (with Jesse & Joy) | Won | |
| Telehit Awards | 2009 | Most Important Latin American Artist | Himself | Won | |
| World Music Awards | 1999 | Best-Selling Spanish Artist | Himself | Won | |
| World Music Awards | 2004 | Best-Selling Spanish Artist | Himself | Won | |
