= Colección Definitiva =

Greatest hits album by Alejandro Sanz
- Released: November 16, 2011
- Recorded: 1991–2011
- Genre: Latin pop
- Length: 95:02
- Language: Spanish and English
- Label: WEA Latina

Alejandro Sanz chronology
Canciones Para Un Paraíso En Vivo (2010)	Colección Definitiva (2011)	La Música No Se Toca (2012)

Colección Definitiva is a collection from 20 years of singing from Spanish singer-songwriter Alejandro Sanz with WEA Latina. Alejandro's greatest works from Viviendo deprisa (1991) to Paraíso Express (2009) are in this album. Sanz released this album because after 20 years working with WEA Latina, He signed a contract with Universal Music Group. "Colección Definitiva" included 4 CD and 1 DVD. On 2 CDs, There are all duets and collaborations sanz made with other artist like Shakira, El Canto Del Loco, Joaquín Sabina, Miguel Bosé and The Corrs. and there is DVD, which includes all Alejandro Sanz's music videos up-to-date with additional content.

== Track listing ==
=== CD 1 (Grandes Éxitos) ===
1. Corazón partio
2. ¿Lo ves?
3. Amiga mía
4. Mi soledad y yo
5. Mi primera canción
6. Y, ¿si fuera ella?
7. Quiero morir en tu veneno
8. Aquello que me diste
9. Si tú me miras
10. Viviendo deprisa
11. La fuerza del corazón
12. Cómo te echo de menos
13. Pisando fuerte
14. Se le apagó la luz

=== CD2 (Grandes Éxitos) ===
1. Looking for Paradise – con Alicia Keys
2. Quisiera ser
3. A la primera persona
4. Te lo agradezco pero no – con Shakira
5. No es lo mismo
6. Nuestro amor será leyenda
7. Cuando nadie me ve
8. Try to save your song
9. Desde cuando
10. Enséñame tus manos
11. El alma al aire
12. Lola soledad
13. Regálame la silla donde te esperé
14. Tú no tienes alma
15. Sin que se note

=== CD (Colaboraciones) ===
1. Shakira – La tortura (2005)
2. El canto del loco – Volverá (2009)
3. Armando Manzanero – Adoro (2000)
4. Miguel Bosé – Hay días
5. Paolo Vallesi – Grande (1997)
6. Niña Pastori – Cai (2000)
7. Raphael – La fuerza del corazón (2008)
8. The Corrs – The hardest Day
9. Jeros (Los Chichos) – Quiero estar solo (2001)
10. Alexandre Pires – Sólo que me falta (2003)
11. Malú – El aprendiz (2004)
12. Jarabe de Palo – La quiero a morir (2010)
13. Homenaje a la música Brasileña. Samba pa ti – Sozinho (2007)

=== CD (Duetos) ===
1. Antonio Carmona – Para que tú no llores (2006)
2. Vicente Amigo y Enrique Morente – Y será verdad (2009)
3. Moncho – Me vestí de silencio (1999)
4. Lena – Tu corazón (2006)
5. Pepe de Lucía – La vida es un espejo"
6. Iván Lins – Llegaste (Vieste) (2010)
7. Joaquín Sabina – Lola Soledad (2010)
8. Omara Portuondo – Eso (2004)
9. Sara Vega – Vuela (2010)
10. Juan Habichuela y Ketama – Dale al aire (1999)
11. Homenaje a Javier Krahe – Sábanas de seda (2004)
12. Tributo a Neruda – Marinero en tierra (2004)
13. Vainica Doble – Dame tu amor (1997)

=== DVD (Videoclips) ===
1. Pisando fuerte
2. Los dos cogidos de la mano
3. Como te echo de menos
4. Si tu me miras
5. La fuerza del corazón
6. Mi soledad y yo
7. ¿Lo ves?
8. Quiero morir en tu veneno
9. Aquello que me diste
10. Y, ¿si fuera ella?
11. Corazón partio
12. Amiga mía
13. Corazón partio (Latin Remix)
14. Cuando nadie me ve
15. El alma al aire
16. Quisiera ser
17. The hardest Day (con The Corrs)
18. Una noche (con The Corrs)
19. Llega, llego soledad
20. Y solo se me ocurre amarte
21. Aprendiz
22. No es lo mismo
23. Try to save your song
24. Regálame la silla donde te esperé
25. Regálame la silla donde te espere (montaje ASZ)
26. He sido tan Feliz contigo
27. A la primera persona
28. Te los agradezco pero no
29. Enséñame tus manos
30. Looking for paradise
31. Desde cuando
32. Nuestro amor será leyenda
33. Lola soledad
34. Sin que se note (Directo)

== Charts ==
=== Weekly charts ===
Weekly chart performance for Colección Definitiva
Chart (2011)	Peak position
Mexican Albums (Top 100 Mexico)	57
Spanish Albums (PROMUSICAE)	7

=== Year-end charts ===
Year-end chart performance for Colección Definitiva
Chart (2012)	Position
Spanish Albums (PROMUSICAE)	40

== Certifications ==
Region	Certification	Certified units/sales
Spain (PROMUSICAE)	Gold	20,000^{^}
^{^} Shipments figures based on certification alone.
