= Basico =

Basico may refer to:

- Basicò, a comune (municipality) in the Province of Messina, Sicily
- Básico, a 1993 album by Alejandro Sanz
