= Nuestro Amor Será Leyenda =

Single by Alejandro Sanz

from the album Paraíso Express
- Released: April 12, 2010
- Recorded: 2008–2009
- Studio: Berkeley Street Studio (Santa Monica, California); Cutting Cane Studio (Davie, Florida); Jet Wash Studio; Picks & Hammers; Studio Paradiso; The Hit Factory-Critiera (Miami, Florida); The Tiki Room (Pembroke Pines, Florida)
- Genre: Latin pop
- Length: 4:38
- Label: WEA Latina
- Songwriter: Alejandro Sanz · Tommy Torres
- Producer: Tommy Torres

Alejandro Sanz singles chronology
"Desde Cuándo" (2010)	"Nuestro Amor Será Leyenda" (2010)	"Lola Soledad" (2010)

Music video
- "Nuestro Amor Será Leyenda" on YouTube

"Nuestro Amor Será Leyenda" (English: "Our Love Will Be Legend") is a song recorded by the Spanish singer-songwriter Alejandro Sanz. It was released as the third single from his eighth studio album Paraíso Express (2009). The song was released for digital download on April 12, 2010.

== Song information ==
"Nuestro Amor Será Leyenda" (2010)
24 second preview of the song.

"Nuestro Amor Será Leyenda" is the third single of Sanz's eighth studio album, Paraíso Express. This song is written by Sanz alongside Puerto Rican producer, singer, and songwriter, Tommy Torres.

The lyrics of the song show that how much Sanz loves his love but he's far from her, one of the best quotes about this is "Desde lejos yo te quiero con el fuego", which means "I love you like fire form afar".

== Music video ==
A music video, directed by Alejandro Toledo, was shot in 2010 in Spain. Toledo worked with Sanz before on El Alma al Aire music video.

== Chart performance ==
=== Weekly charts ===
Chart (2010)	Peak position
Spain (Promusicae)	11
US Hot Latin Songs (Billboard)	25
US Latin Pop Airplay (Billboard)	5
