= Canciones Para Un Paraíso En Vivo =

Live album by Alejandro Sanz
- Released: July 5, 2010
- Recorded: 2010, Madrid
- Genre: Latin pop
- Length: 1:45:23
- Language: Spanish and English
- Label: WEA Latina

Alejandro Sanz chronology
| Paraíso Express (2009) | Canciones Para Un Paraíso En Vivo (2010) | Colección Definitiva (2011) |

Canciones Para Un Paraíso En Vivo is the fourth live album by Spanish singer-songwriter Alejandro Sanz. It was recorded in Madrid on July 5, 2010. The album, released in digipack format, contains a CD with a selection of 10 tracks of the concert with one bonus track and a DVD with all 17 live performance. Sanz performed some of his old classic songs like "No Es Lo Mismo", "Corazón Partío" along with a medley and the entire Paraíso Express album except "Pero Esta Tarde No Te Vas" and "Tú No Tienes La Culpa". It also include a duet with Spanish singer-songwriter Joaquín Sabina on Sanz's latest single, "Lola Soledad", as a bonus track.

== Track listing ==
=== CD ===
1. Mi Peter Punk
2. Lo Que Fui Es Lo Que Soy
3. Desde cuando
4. Viviendo deprisa
5. Corazón partío
6. Cuando Nadie Me Ve
7. Hice llorar hasta Los Ángeles
8. Nuestro amor será leyenda
9. Lola soledad
10. Looking for paradise

Bonus Track

1. Lola soledad – feat. Joaquín Sabina (Bonus Track)

=== DVD ===
1. Mi Peter Punk
2. Lo Que Fui Es Lo Que Soy
3. Desde Cuando
4. Viviendo Deprisa
5. Nuestro Amor Sera Leyenda
6. Corazon Partio
7. Cuando Nadie Me Ve
8. Yo Hice Llorar Hasta a Los Angeles
9. Para Que Tu No Llores
10. Sin Que Se Note
11. Si Hay Dios
12. Lola Soledad
13. Aquello Que Me Diste
14. Mala
15. No Es Lo Mismo
16. Looking For Paradise
17. Medley: A La Primera Persona/Mi Soledad y Yo/Amiga Mia/Y si fuera ella?

== Personnel ==
- Luis Aquino – Trumpet
- Mike Ciro – Director, electric guitar
- Sarah Devine – Background vocals
- Fernando Díaz – Engineer, mixing
- Claudio Divella – Photography
- Luis Dulzaides – Percussion
- Juan Carlos "Diez Pianos" García – Technician
- Selan Lerner – Background vocals, keyboards
- Carlos Martin – Keyboards, percussion, trombone, trumpet
- Alfonso Pérez – Background vocals, electric guitar, keyboards
- Steve Rodríguez – Bass
- Alejandro Sanz – Vocals
- Nathaniel Townsley – Drums
- Javier Vercher – Flute, saxophone

== Charts ==
Weekly chart performance for Canciones Para Un Paraíso En Vivo
| Chart (2010) | Peak position |
|---|---|
| Mexican Albums (AMPROFON) | 27 |
| Spanish Albums (PROMUSICAE) | 14 |
| US Latin Pop Albums (Billboard) | 16 |
