= Sierra Noble =

Canadian musician (born 1990)

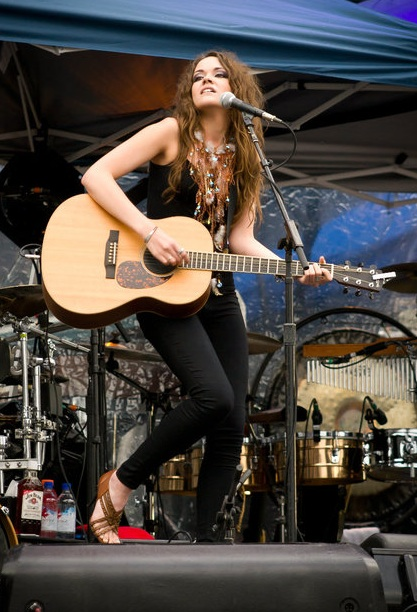
- Sierra Noble performing as opening act for Bon Jovi in Winnipeg, MB on his 2010 "Circle" Tour

Background information
- Born: Sierra Dawn Sky Noble; February 20, 1990 (age 36); Ottawa, Ontario, Canada
- Genres: Pop, folk, country, roots rock, Celtic
- Occupations: Singer-songwriter, musician
- Instruments: Vocals, fiddle, violin, guitar
- Years active: 2003–present
- Labels: Independent, MapleMusic Recordings
- Website: www.sierranoblemusic.com

Sierra Dawn Sky Noble (born February 20, 1990) is a non-binary Canadian singer-songwriter, and fiddle player. Their first album was instrumental, they played a traditional fiddle and followed up with a vocal album in 2008. They have won numerous musical awards and have opened for famous rock stars like Bon Jovi. They are also an active philanthropist.

== Biography ==
=== Early life ===
Born in Ottawa, Ontario, Noble is the third and youngest child of Sherry Noble (born in Kingston, Ontario) and David Noble (born in Muscatine, Iowa). They moved to Winnipeg, Manitoba in 1990.

Sierra attended École Laura Secord School from pre-school to the grade 4 when they transferred to Wolseley School for grades 5 and 6. They attended and graduated from Gordon Bell High School with the exception of grades 10 and 11 when they attended The University of Winnipeg Collegiate on a full scholarship from the University of Winnipeg president, Lloyd Axworthy.

Sierra Noble began by busking at The Forks in Winnipeg. At the age of 12, Sierra became the youth ambassador for the Manitoba Campaign to Ban Landmines. In this capacity they began making presentations about the global landmine issue in various schools, universities, and colleges. In 2004 they were selected to be one of two representatives of Canada at the Ban Landmines International Children's Conference.

=== Music career ===
In 2005, they released an instrumental album of traditional Old Time fiddle music entitled "Spirit of The Strings", produced by Randy Hiebert (guitar player of The Bellamy Brothers), distributed by Arbor Records/EMI Canada.

In December 2008, Sierra released their debut vocal release entitled "Possibilities" on MapleMusic Recordings, produced by Toronto-based record producer, Bill Bell. The first single release from the album, "Possibility" (co-written by Noble, Chris Burke-Gaffney, and Keith Macpherson) was on rotation on pop radio and country radio in Canada, with the music video for the song reaching No. 1 on MuchMore and appeared in the Top 20 in CMT (Canada)'s Cross Canada Countdown.

In 2011, they won the 52nd edition of the Viña del Mar International Song Festival with the song "Try Anything".

In 2016 they released their album City of Ghosts, before going on a hiatus for the next 5 years, in 2021 they released “Let Me Out of Here.”

=== Philanthropy ===
They have received various awards for their humanitarian and volunteer services including the Inaugural Queen’s Golden Jubilee Medal, the Manitoba Premier’s Volunteer Service Award, the Canadian Red Cross Young Humanitarian of the Year 2012, the Manitoba Teacher’s Society Young Humanitarian Award, and Manitoba Hydro’s Spirit of the Earth Youth Award.

The citation for the Manitoba Teacher’s Society Young Humanitarian read: "Sierra Noble is a Grade 5 student at Wolseley School who has taken it upon herself to help children who have been victims of war. A visit to a War Child exhibit last September inspired her to promote awareness of the landmine issue. She has spoken at a number of schools, collected signatures for a petition to the U.S. president and was heavily involved in Landmines Awareness Week. Sierra works directly with war-affected refugee children at a downtown center called NEEDS. Currently, she is trying to help a Somalian boy get the rest of his family to Canada from Nairobi, Kenya".
