= Lola Soledad =

Single by Alejandro Sanz

from the album Paraíso Express
- B-side: "Duet Version"
- Released: October 15, 2010 (Original); November 11, 2011 (Duet)
- Recorded: 2009
- Genre: Latin pop
- Length: 3:35
- Label: WEA Latina
- Songwriters: Alejandro Sanz, Tommy Torres
- Producer: Tommy Torres

Alejandro Sanz singles chronology
"Nuestro Amor Será Leyenda" (2010)	"Lola Soledad" (2010)	"No Me Compares" (2012)

Music video
- "Lola Soledad" on YouTube

"Lola Soledad" (English: "Lola Loneliness") is a song recorded by the Spanish singer-songwriter Alejandro Sanz. It was released as the fourth and last single from his eighth studio album Paraíso Express (2009). The song was released for digital download on October 15, 2010.

== Song information ==
"Lola Soledad" (2010)
First chorus of the music.

The song is a tribute to a special woman's life, named Lola. It's about loneliness of lola and how she lives her life. also Alejandro sings about himself and his feelings for Lola. In the second chorus of the song, he sings "Tú ya no estás sola aquí estoy yo", It means "You are not alone here I am", Alejandro comes to save his love from this loneliness and stay with her to end her sadness.

== Music video ==
Sanz and Verdú in the video.

A music video for the song was filmed in October 2010. Director of the video is Gracia Querejeta. she is a famous Spanish director who also directed movies like Las palabras de Max and Seven Billiard Tables.

It also stars Spanish actress, Maribel Verdú. Verdú played the role of Lola in this video. In the beginning of the video, we saw an alarm ringing. Lola woke up and started her day, washed the dishes and made coffee. In this video, we clearly saw loneliness of Lola in her daily life. In the end, we saw Alejandro found his way to Lola to end her loneliness . In the last scene, Lola came from behind and kissed Alejandro.

== Duet version with Joaquin Sabina ==
In 2010, Alejandro released his new Live album, Canciones Para Un Paraíso En Vivo. In this album, he put a Bonus track, new version of Lola Soledad featuring Spanish singer, Joaquin Sabina. This track officially released on November 11, 2011.

== Live performances ==
The single was performed live many times. On many stages, Alejandro performed this music by himself, like the original version and on few stages, Alejandro Performed it with a guest artist. For example, once Sanz invited Colombian singer-songwriter Juanes to Miami, Flo. to perform this music with him. or at 2011 Viña del Mar International Song Festival, Sanz invited Argentinian singer Noel Schajris to do a duet on this song. Interesting fact is that both Juanes and Noel Schajris had some mistakes during their performances.

== Chart performance ==
Chart (2010)	Peak position
Spain (PROMUSICAE)	31
