= Básico =

Live album by Alejandro Sanz
- Released: 1994
- Recorded: 1993 at CineArte (Madrid, Spain)
- Genre: Acoustic music, Latin pop
- Length: 44:07
- Label: WEA Latina
- Producer: Nacho Mañó

Alejandro Sanz chronology
Si Tú Me Miras (1993)	Básico (1994)	3 (1995)

Singles from Básico
- 1. "Que No Te Daría Yo" Released: 1994; 2. "Tu Letra Podré Acariciar" Released: 1994

Professional ratings
Review scores
Source	Rating
Allmusic	3/5 stars

Básico is the first live album from Spanish singer Alejandro Sanz. Básico was released in promotion of Si Tú Me Miras. The album features a concert recorded in 1993, in which he gave an acoustic treatment to the hits of Viviendo Deprisa and Si Tú Me Miras. The album was originally a limited edition, but after the success of the album Más, it was re-edited on 26 May 1998.

== Track listing ==
1. Mi Primera Canción – 5:48
2. Pisando Fuerte – 4:35
3. Que No Te Daría Yo – 4:03
4. Si Tú Me Miras – 4:02
5. Cómo Te Echo de Menos – 3:59
6. Los Dos Cogidos de la Mano – 4:40
7. Tu Letra Podré Acariciar – 3:32
8. A Golpes Contra el Calendario – 5:16
9. Se Le Apagó la Luz – 4:36
10. Viviendo Deprisa – 3:36

== Personnel ==
- Domingo J. Casas – Photography
- Nando González – Background vocals, acoustic guitar
- Guere – Background vocals, acoustic bass
- Nacho Mañó – Producer, director
- Nacho Mañó – Acoustic guitar ("Tu Letra Podré Acariciar" and "A Golpes Contra el Calendario")
- Gino Pavone – Percussion
- Fran Rubio – Rhodes piano, piano
- Alejandro Sanz – Vocals, Spanish guitar, acoustic guitar
- Fernando Toussaint – Drums
- R. Vigil – Design
- Juan Vinader – Engineer, mixing

== Sales and certifications ==
Region	Certification	Certified units/sales
Argentina (CAPIF)	Platinum	60,000^{^}
Spain (PROMUSICAE)	2× Platinum	200,000^{^}
^{^} Shipments figures based on certification alone.
