= Looking for Paradise =

Single by Alejandro Sanz featuring Alicia Keys

from the album Paraíso Express
- Released: 23 September 2009
- Studio: Criteria Studios (Miami, FL)
- Genre: Latin pop, R&B
- Length: 4:41
- Label: WEA Latina
- Songwriters: Alejandro Sanz, Alicia Keys
- Producer: Tommy Torres

Alejandro Sanz singles chronology
"En la Planta de Tus Pies" (2007)	"Looking for Paradise" (2009)	"Desde Cuándo" (2010)

Alicia Keys singles chronology
"Doesn't Mean Anything" (2009)	"Looking for Paradise" (2009)	"Try Sleeping with a Broken Heart" (2009)

"Looking for Paradise" is a song by Spanish singer Alejandro Sanz featuring American singer-songwriter Alicia Keys. It is the first single from Sanz's eighth studio album, Paraíso Express. Released through Warner Music via music download on 23 September 2009, the song topped the Spanish Singles Chart and was certified platinum by PROMUSICAE. The collaboration won the Billboard Latin Music Award for Hot Latin Song of the Year, Vocal Event in 2010.

== Composition ==
The song is written by the artists themselves with Kasseem Deam and Tomas Torres, the latter also a producer of the track. In an interview with El Mundo, Sanz talked about the meaning of the song and the decision to collaborate with Keys:

"It is a very positively song, musically and lyrically, in which it speaks directly to the listener, inviting him to look for his paradise. That paradise is often within us, although sometimes we insist on looking for it outside. Alicia is a very authentic woman for music. I think she is going to be a surprise for many people."

In Brazil, the song was included in the international soundtrack of Tempos Modernos.

== Music video ==
The music video for the song, directed by Gil Green, was filmed in Barcelona, Spain, and released on September 25, 2009 through the Sanz's YouTube channel.

== Accolades ==
Award nominations for "Looking for Paradise"
Year	Ceremony	Award	Result	Ref.
2010	Billboard Latin Music Awards	Hot Latin Song of the Year, Vocal Event	Won	
2010	Premios 40 Principales	Best Song	Nominated	
2010	Premios Ondas	Mejor canción	Won	
2011	Premio Lo Nuestro	Collaboration of the Year	Nominated	

== Chart performance ==
The song entered the U.S. Billboard charts on the week of 10 October 2009. It debuted at number 10 on the Latin Pop Songs chart. On the next week, it rise to number 4; at number 21 on the Hot Latin Songs chart and later, the song was the airplay gainer, rising to number 9, on its third week rise again to number 7; and at number 32 on the Tropical Songs chart. The song, so far, peaked at number 67 on the Billboard Radio Songs chart. On the week of 14 November 2009, the song went to number 1 on the Billboard Latin Pop Songs chart and Tropical Songs chart. A week later, the song finally went to number 1 on the Billboard Hot Latin Songs chart. This was Keys' first number one on all three charts, which also made her the first African-American of non-Hispanic origin to reach number 1 on the Hot Latin Tracks.

== Charts ==
=== Weekly charts ===
Chart (2009)	Peak position
Mexico (Monitor Latino)	1
Spain (Promusicae)	1
US Bubbling Under Hot 100 (Billboard)	4
US Hot Latin Songs (Billboard)	1
US Latin Pop Airplay (Billboard)	1
US Tropical Airplay (Billboard)	1
Venezuela (Record Report)	1

=== Year-end charts ===
Chart (2009)	Position
Spain (PROMUSICAE)	17

== Certifications ==
Region	Certification	Certified units/sales
Spain (Promusicae)	Platinum	40,000^{*}
^{*} Sales figures based on certification alone.

== See also ==
- List of number-one singles of 2009 (Spain)
- List of number-one Billboard Hot Latin Songs of 2009
- List of number-one Billboard Hot Latin Pop Airplay of 2009
- List of number-one Billboard Hot Latin Pop Airplay of 2010
