= Desde Cuándo =

Single by Alejandro Sanz

from the album Paraíso Express
- B-side: "Acoustic version"
- Released: January 11, 2010 (Airplay); January 18, 2010 (Digital)
- Recorded: 2008–2009
- Studio: Berkeley Street Studio (Santa Monica, California); Cutting Cane Studio (Davie, Florida); Jet Wash Studio; Picks & Hammers; Studio Paradiso; The Hit Factory-Critiera (Miami, Florida); The Tiki Room (Pembroke Pines, Florida)
- Genre: Latin music, latin pop, pop, pop rock, soft rock
- Length: 3:55 (Album version); 3:48 (Acoustic version)
- Label: WEA Latina
- Songwriter: Alejandro Sanz · Tommy Torres
- Producer: Tommy Torres

Alejandro Sanz singles chronology
| "Looking for Paradise" (2009) | "Desde Cuándo" (2010) | "Nuestro Amor Será Leyenda" (2010) |

"Desde Cuándo" (English: "Since When") is a song by Spanish singer-songwriter Alejandro Sanz. The song serves as second single for Sanz's eighth studio album Paraíso Express (2009). It was released airplay through Warner Music Latina on January 11, 2010 and digitally on January 18, 2010.

== Music video ==
Sanz and Longoria in the music video

A music video for the song was filmed in December 2009. It was filmed in Golden Oak Ranch studios from Disney on Los Angeles, Cal. It was directed by Pedro Castro who also directed the video for "Looking for Paradise" alongside British Phil Griffin.

It also stars American actress Eva Longoria as Sanz's love interest. The video is set in a field environment with a river where Sanz and Longoria ride bicycles, sleep together and have a romantic and conspiratorial attitude at all times. Speaking about the video Longoria said "I really like Alejandro's music. He is very talented and it was an honour to be able to work with him" while Sanz said "Working with Eva is a pleasure, she is a great friend with whom I have a lot in common, she is easy to connect to and as an actress she helped me make the video more credible." The music video was premiered on December 23, 2009.

== Charts ==
| Chart (2009–2010) | Peak position |
|---|---|
| Spain (Promusicae) | 5 |
| Mexico (Monitor Latino) | 2 |
| US Hot Latin Songs (Billboard) | 18 |
| US Latin Pop Airplay (Billboard) | 7 |
| Venezuela (Record Report) | 11 |

== Certifications ==
| Country | Provider | Certifications (sales thresholds) |
|---|---|---|
| Spain | PROMUSICAE | Gold |
