= Paraíso Express =

Studio album by Alejandro Sanz
- Released: November 10, 2009
- Recorded: 2008–2009
- Studios: Berkeley Street Studio (Santa Monica, California); Cutting Cane Studio (Davie, Florida); Jet Wash Studio; Picks & Hammers; Studio Paradiso; The Hit Factory-Critiera (Miami, Florida); The Tiki Room (Pembroke Pines, Florida)
- Genres: Latin pop; Pop rock; Latin music; Latin rock; Alternative rock
- Length: 42:17
- Languages: Spanish; English
- Label: WEA Latina
- Producer: Tommy Torres

Alejandro Sanz chronology
El Tren de los Momentos: En Vivo Desde Buenos Aires (2007)	Paraíso Express (2009)	Canciones Para Un Paraíso En Vivo (2010)

Singles from Paraíso Express
- 1. "Looking for Paradise" Released: September 21, 2009; 2. "Desde Cuándo" Released: January 11, 2010; 3. "Nuestro Amor Será Leyenda" Released: April 12, 2010; 4. "Lola Soledad" Released: July 12, 2010

Paraíso Express (Paradise Express) is the ninth studio album recorded by Spanish singer-songwriter Alejandro Sanz. It was released by WEA Latina on November 10, 2009, (see 2009 in music) and was produced by Tommy Torres, mixed by Bob Clearmountain, mastered by Ted Jensen. This album is the follow-up to the Grammy Award-winning albums No Es lo Mismo (2003) and El Tren de los Momentos (2006). All the tracks included were written by Sanz, along with several writers, a first for the singer, and also the first album without help by Emmanuele Rufinengo and Lulo Pérez, his longtime producing team. Paraíso Express received a nomination for an Album of the Year and won Best Male Pop Vocal Album at the 11th Annual Latin Grammy Awards. It is also won a Grammy Award for Best Latin Pop Album in the 53rd Annual Grammy Awards in 2011.

== Background and composition ==
In July 2009, Alejandro Sanz confirmed through his official website that he was finalizing the details of his long-awaited new album, the first since 2006, El Tren de los Momentos, which was awarded with the Grammy Award for Best Latin Pop Album and sold 120,000 units in United States. In one of his posts, the singer broadcast a video that showed Sanz and American singer-songwriter Alicia Keys recording a music video in New York City. Keys also made public the fact that she was featured on both a video and a song with Sanz, through her Twitter account. The remaining details of the album recording were a mystery. The only fact revealed was that Tommy Torres would be producing the album. Furthermore, Sanz was focused during this time on the preparation of a live performance along Colombian singer-songwriter Juanes on July 26 in Honduras. Before the release of the first single, Sanz asked to his fans and friends to send him to his website their ideas about paradise. "I was surprised that everyone was talking nearby havens that have to do with family, friends", stressed the composer during the press conference held for the album presentation. The album title was made public on September 4, 2009. The song "Looking for Paradise" was premiered on a fan club members-only section of Sanz's official site on September 18, 2009. In the track both singers performs lyrics in English and Spanish.

== Singles ==
The first single yielded from the album, "Looking for Paradise", was preceded by a viral campaign in which fans and friends of the artist were asked to send him ideas of paradise. The song, a collaboration with American singer-songwriter Alicia Keys, became another number-one hit for Sanz in the Billboard Hot Latin Tracks chart, and the first for Keys in this chart. The album debuted at the top of the charts in Spain and the Latin charts in United States, and eventually peaked at number-one in Mexico. "Desde Cuándo" was released as the second single of the album in 2010.

== Style ==
It is more of a rock album than my past releases, with more elegant and positive lyrics and a happier and more rhythmic spirit.

— Alejandro Sanz, Billboard Magazine

This album marks Sanz' return to the light-hearted and melancholy song styles he had in his 2000 album El Alma al Aire, after going through more experimental or alternative stages in his two previous albums. According to Sanz, the songs included on Paraíso Express are the happiest of his career as a songwriter, but they are not "autobiographical" or "have a lot of his life", they are "common themes and attitudes of people." "Mi Peter Punk", deals with the issue of "those people who does not enjoy the stages of life"; "Hice Llorar Hasta los Angeles", refers to the author religious beliefs; "Lola Soledad" is a tribute to a very special woman in his life; and "Looking for Paradise" is about the search for a paradise for everyone of us. With Paraíso Express traded his trademark flamenco arrangements and Latin percussion beats, to get closer to a pop and British rock style. Sanz said that this was something different, "it could be a step forward or backward." On his work relationship with Torres, Sanz told: "Tommy did a perfect interpretation in that sense. Everything flowed in a very natural way."

The songs were recorded in Barcelona, Spain, and "Looking for Paradise" in New York City on Alicia Keys recording places and studio. When Sanz revealed the track listing and the official cover for the album, he said that the album was almost soft rock, and the music is more happy and calmed that the past albums.

== Track listing ==
No.	Title	Writer(s)	Producer(s)	Length
1.	"Mi Peter Punk"	Alejandro Sanz · Tommy Torres	Tommy Torres	3:45
2.	"Desde Cuándo"	Alejandro Sanz · Tommy Torres	Tommy Torres	3:55
3.	"Looking for Paradise" (featuring Alicia Keys)	Alejandro Sanz · Tommy Torres · Alicia Keys	Tommy Torres	4:33
4.	"Yo Hice Llorar Hasta los Ángeles"	Alejandro Sanz · Tommy Torres	Torres	4:10
5.	"Sin Qué Se Note"	Alejandro Sanz · Tommy Torres	Tommy Torres	4:26
6.	"Lola Soledad"	Alejandro Sanz · Tommy Torres	Tommy Torres	3:33
7.	"Pero Esta Tarde No Te Vas"	Alejandro Sanz · Tommy Torres	Torres	4:22
8.	"Mala"	Alejandro Sanz · Tommy Torres · Dan Warner	Torres	4:16
9.	"Tú No Tienes la Culpa"	Alejandro Sanz	Tommy Torres	4:39
10.	"Nuestro Amor Será Leyenda"	Alejandro Sanz · Tommy Torres	Tommy Torres	4:40
Total length:				42:17

Digital Version
No.	Title	Writer(s)	Producer(s)	Length
1.	"Mi Peter Punk"		Tommy Torres
2.	"Desde Cuándo"		Tommy Torres
3.	"Looking for Paradise" (featuring Alicia Keys)	A. Sanz · A. Cook	A. Sanz · T. Torres · B. Clearmountain	4:41
4.	"Yo Hice Llorar Hasta los Ángeles"		Tommy Torres
5.	"Sin Que Se Note"		Tommy Torres
6.	"Lola Soledad"		Tommy Torres
7.	"Pero Esta Tarde No Te Vas"		Tommy Torres
8.	"Mala"		Tommy Torres
9.	"Tú No Tienes la Culpa"		Tommy Torres
10.	"Looking for Paradise (Remix)"	A. Sanz · A. Cook	A. Sanz · T. Torres · B. Clearmountain
11.	"Desde Cuándo (Acoustic version)"		Tommy Torres

== Charts and sales ==
=== Charts ===
Chart (2009)	Peak position
Chile Album Charts	1
Mexican Albums Chart	1
Spanish Albums Chart	1
U.S. Billboard Top Latin Albums	1
U.S. Billboard Latin Pop Albums	1
U.S. Billboard 200	84

=== Sales and certifications ===
Region	Certification	Certified units/sales
Argentina (CAPIF)	Platinum	40,000^{^}
Mexico (AMPROFON)	Platinum	60,000^{^}
Spain (Promusicae)	3× Platinum	180,000^{^}
^{^} Shipments figures based on certification alone.
