= Alejandro Sanz =

Spanish musician (born 1968)

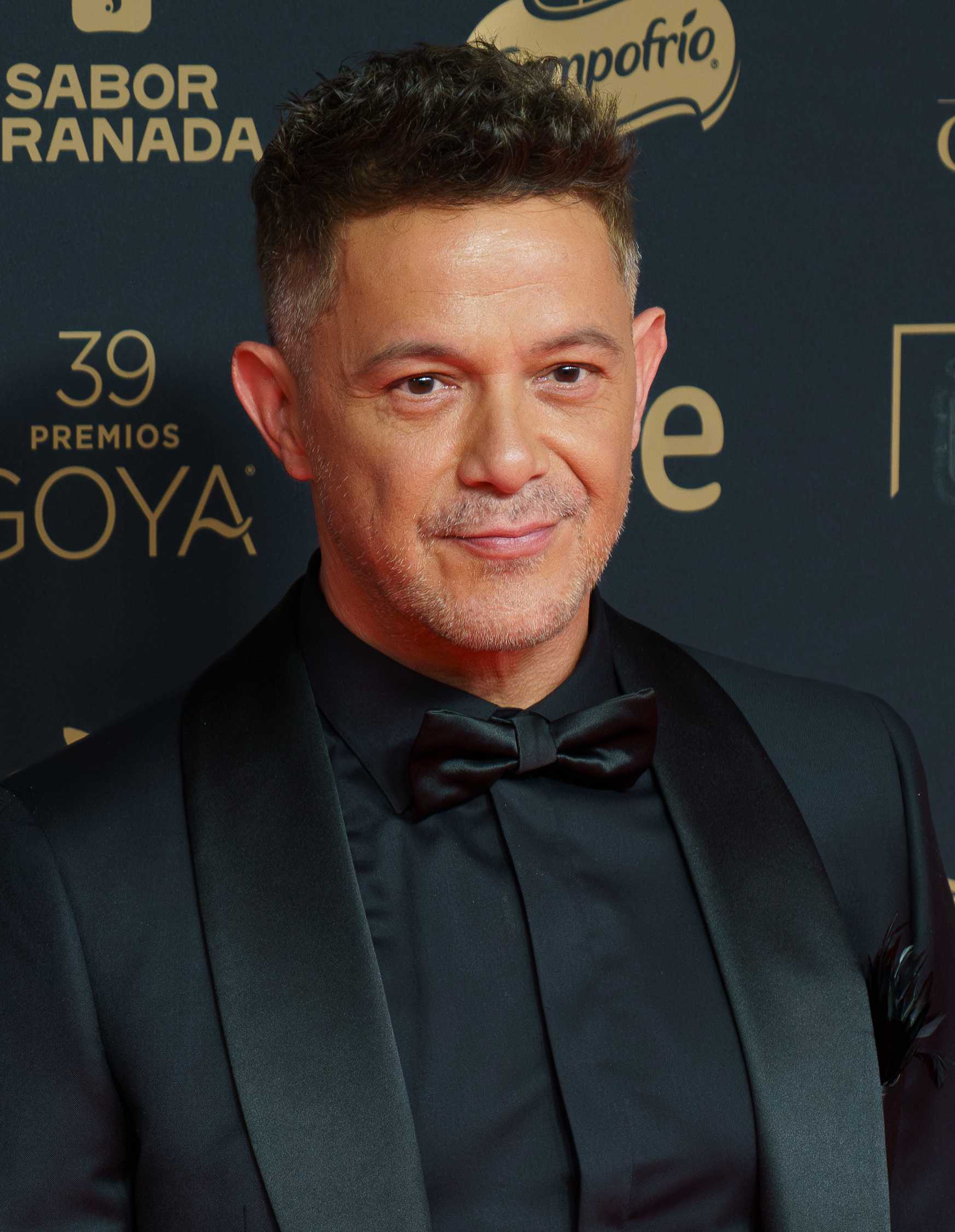
- Sanz in 2025

Background information
- Born: Alejandro Sánchez Pizarro; 18 December 1968 (age 57); Madrid, Spain
- Genres: Flamenco; pop rock; soft rock
- Occupations: Musician; singer; composer
- Instruments: Vocals; guitar
- Years active: 1988–present
- Labels: WEA Latina; Universal Spain; Sony Spain
- Awards: Full list
- Website: www.alejandrosanz.com (in Spanish)

Alejandro Sánchez Pizarro, better known as Alejandro Sanz (Spanish pronunciation: [aleˈxandɾo ˈsanθ]; born 18 December 1968), is a Spanish musician, singer and composer. He has won four Grammy Awards and twenty-four Latin Grammy Awards, including three Latin Grammy Award for Album of the Year and Person of the Year in 2017. The singer is notable for his flamenco-influenced ballads, and has also experimented with several other genres including pop, rock, funk, R&B and jazz. Sanz has sold over 20 million records worldwile, becoming one of the most successful Spanish singers being honored with the Billboard Latin Music Lifetime Achievement Award (2024), the Los 40 Golden Music Awards (2017) and the ASCAP Latin Heritage Award (2011).

Sanz released his debut album at age nineteen, although he did not gain commercial success in Spain until his second release, Viviendo Deprisa (1991). His next two records, Si Tú Me Miras (1993) and 3 (1995) also fared well commercially, but it was his 1997 breakthrough album Más that garnered international success. El Alma al Aire followed in 2000, selling more than a million copies in its first week and generate his first two Latin Grammy Awards, including Album of the Year, and his first Grammy Award nomination. In 2002, he became the first Spanish artist to record an MTV Unplugged album, his second record to win the Latin Grammy for Album of the Year.

His collaboration with Shakira on the 2005 single "La Tortura" reached number one on several charts worldwide and was recognized with the Latin Grammy Award for Record of the Year. He experimented with more diverse styles of music with the albums No Es lo Mismo (2003) and El Tren de los Momentos (2006), and Paraíso Express (2009), all three were honored with the Grammy Award for Best Latin Pop Album. Sanz signed to Universal Music Group in 2011 and released his tenth studio album, La Música No Se Toca, in 2012, followed by Sirope in 2015. In 2019 he published his twelfth studio album #El Disco which became his fourth album to win the Grammy Awards for Best Latin Pop Album, promoted by the collaboration "Mi Persona Favorita" with Camila Cabello. In 2021 he published his thirteenth studio album Sanz, followeby ¿Y ahora qué? in 2025, promoted by his second collaboration with Shakira "Bésame", which won the Latin Grammy Award for Best Contemporary Pop Album.

== Early life ==
Sanz was born on 18 December 1968, the youngest son of María Pizarro and Jesús Sánchez. He grew up in the neighborhood of Moratalaz in eastern Madrid. Sanz recalled that "Back then, kids grew up on the street...I was a bit like the group troubadour; the one who played the guitar and sang. That kept me out of a lot of trouble." Sanz's father, a door-to-door book salesman, played guitar professionally, which inspired seven-year-old Sanz to learn to play the instrument. He pursued the instrument with an intensity that eventually frustrated his mother, who broke his guitar one morning after his playing kept the family from sleeping.

He was exposed to traditional flamenco music as a child while vacationing each summer in his parents' native Andalusia in southern Spain. Originally, Sanz intended to become a flamenco performer, but he found the music teachers to be overly strict. Commenting on his early experiences, Sanz explained, "Flamenco can be very hard on beginners. If you lose the rhythm, they toss you out with, 'You're no good, boy!' They're very strict and very cruel. But it's also a marvelous education, because you either learn to play or else." He felt that he could not compete with his peers, and decided to focus on creating pop music with flamenco influences, viewing flamenco to be a "lifestyle" better suited to others.

== Recording career ==
=== 1989–1996: First four albums ===
As a teenager, Sanz performed in various venues in his hometown. He became acquainted with Miguel Ángel Arenas, a music industry executive who had signed several popular Spanish groups such as Mecano. Arenas helped Sanz find work, eventually leading to a record deal with the Spanish label Hispavox. In 1989 Sanz released his debut album, Los Chulos Son Pa' Cuidarlos under the name of Alejandro Magno (Spanish for "Alexander the Great"). The record, which fused techno and flamenco, was met with critical and commercial indifference, and today Sanz views the record to be "insignificant". However, the album is now considered to be a collector's item. In an attempt to promote Los Chulos Son Pa' Cuidarlos, he performed at strip clubs, playing short sets between acts. This proved to be unsuccessful and Sanz took a break from music, choosing to study business administration. He also took a job at a recording studio in which he wrote material for other artists. He persuaded Arenas to send demos of his songs to record companies, which led to being signed by Warner Music Latina. At this time, he began performing under his current name.

Sanz's rise to fame began in 1991, when he released his first album from Warner, Viviendo Deprisa. The record and the songs "Pisando Fuerte" and "Se le Apagó la Luz" helped him gain a dedicated fan base in Spain. In 1993, he released Si Tú Me Miras shortly followed by a live album, titled Básico. That same year, he recorded a song entitled "Mi Primera Canción" with flamenco pioneer Paco de Lucía, whom Sanz idolized as a child. He released his third studio album since changing his stage name, 3, in 1995. In addition to Spanish, 3 was also released in Italian and Portuguese. "La Fuerza del Corazón", the first single released from 3, was his first song to chart internationally. All three albums proved to be successful, reaching multi-platinum status in Spain.

=== 1997–2002: Más, El Alma al Aire, and MTV Unplugged ===
"Corazón Partío" (1997)
The single "Corazón Partío", from Más, is influenced by flamenco music and has been described as a "powerhouse ballad". It is considered to be Sanz' breakthrough song, and "changed the course" of the singer's career.

Sanz spent two years in Milan, Italy to work on a follow-up for 3. For the album, he wished to create a "true fusion" of many different sounds, and began studying the saxophone and piano in addition to guitar. In 1997, Sanz released his fifth studio album, Más, a record containing ballads strongly influenced by flamenco, pop, and tropical rhythms. Driven by the singles "Corazón Partío", "Y, ¿Si Fuera Ella?", "Amiga Mía", "Aquello Que Me Diste", and "Siempre Es de Noche", Más sold more than two million copies in Spain and was certified 22× Platinum in the country, making it the best-selling album in Spanish history. The album remained on the Billboard Latin Albums chart for 74 weeks, and one year after the record's release, Sanz was granted an Ondas Award for Best Song for "Corazón Partío". According to David Cazares of the South Florida Sun-Sentinel, the album "made Sanz an international star on the strength of the pop-salsa hit 'Corazón Partío', a song on the lips of fans from Spain to Cuba and the United States." Following the success of the album, Sanz began touring in the United States for the first time.

This record is important because it represents me choosing what I want to do...You're always learning things about music if you want to, and you can apply it to what you want to do. It has a rhythmic complexity and a proximity to flamenco, however it's less obvious.

— Sanz, speaking about El Alma al Aire in 2001.

His fifth album, El Alma al Aire, released 26 September 2000, featured Sanz exploring a wider array of musical genres, including jazz, R&B, soul and tango. In Spain, the album sold more than one million copies in the first week, breaking the record of one million copies sold in four months, also set by Sanz with his previous album, Más. At the 2001 Latin Grammy Awards, Sanz walked away with four awards: Best Pop Male Vocal Album and Album of the Year for El Alma al Aire, and Record of the Year and Song of the Year for the title track from the album. Later that year, El Alma al Aire was released in a special edition including Sanz's duets with Irish band The Corrs. In October 2001, Sanz collaborated with Michael Jackson and various other artists on the Spanish version of the charity single "What More Can I Give", which benefited the victims of the September 11 attacks.

In 2002, Sanz recorded MTV Unplugged at the Gusman Center for the Performing Arts in Miami, Florida. He was the first Spanish artist to record and release an MTV Unplugged album. For Sanz, the recording of the album "changed the way I do my music. It was a rediscovery of how to perform, and also how to record, music with live musicians. That was the spirit of the music in its pure form, though [it is ironic] that the more people who are playing, the more simple it is." With the MTV Unplugged, he garnered three Latin Grammy Awards (Album of the Year, Recording of the Year and Song of the Year for "Y Sólo Se Me Ocurre Amarte"). At the 2002 Grammy Awards, Sanz performed "Quisiera Ser" as a duet with Destiny's Child, with both Spanish lyrics and English lyric adaptation "I'd Like To Be Your Laughter".

=== 2003–2007: No Es lo Mismo and El Tren de los Momentos ===
On 2 September 2003, Sanz released his sixth studio album, No Es lo Mismo. On this record, Sanz took a more political approach than he had on previous releases. The song "Sandy a Orilla do Mundo" discusses oil spills on the Spanish coast, while "Labana" tells the story of people fleeing from Cuba on makeshift rafts. The album won four awards at the 2004 Latin Grammy Awards, including Album of the Year and Record of the Year. Sanz was unable to attend the event and his awards were accepted by presenters and colleagues. Also in 2004, he became the first Spanish musician to give a lecture at Harvard University, speaking about Hispanic culture at the David Rockefeller Center for Latin American Studies.

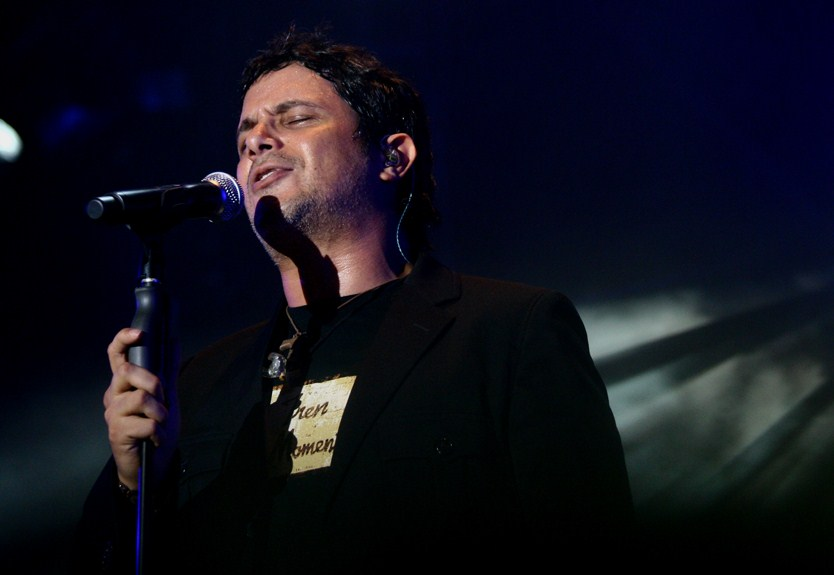
Alejandro Sanz performing in Managua, Nicaragua on 1 November 2007.

In 2005, Sanz collaborated with Shakira on her song "La Tortura". Co-written by Sanz, the song became an international hit, breaking the record for the most weeks at the number one spot on the Hot Latin Songs chart. The song exposed Sanz to a more diverse audience, and helped build anticipation for his next release. The first single from the album El Tren de los Momentos, "A la Primera Persona", became his first song to enter the Billboard Hot 100, peaking at number 100 on the chart. The record was also noted for its guest appearances, which featured Shakira, Juanes, Alex González of Maná, and Residente of Calle 13.

In the spring of 2007, Sanz suffered a mental breakdown and took two months off in the middle of a world tour at the request of his doctor. The breakdown was caused by several events in his personal life, including the death of his father in 2005, his separation with Mexican model and actress Jaydy Michel, and his announcement that he had a three-year-old son outside of his marriage with Michel. He commented on the situation, saying "You have to put things in perspective. It was stress, something that had never affected me, but this time, yes, it did. So I had to pay. A doctor told me to stop for a couple of months to recuperate completely." Sanz spent time in therapy, a time which "helped [him] a lot" and gave him "more power" to perform.

In a press conference in late 2007, he criticized Venezuelan president Hugo Chávez, calling him "undemocratic" in the wake of a petition made by Venezuelan citizens to prevent Chávez from running for re-election. Sanz further stated "If they gave me 3 million signatures to stop singing, I would stop singing immediately." Supporters of Chávez subsequently gathered 230,000 signatures in response to Sanz' comments.

=== 2008–2012: Paraíso Express and La Música no se Toca ===
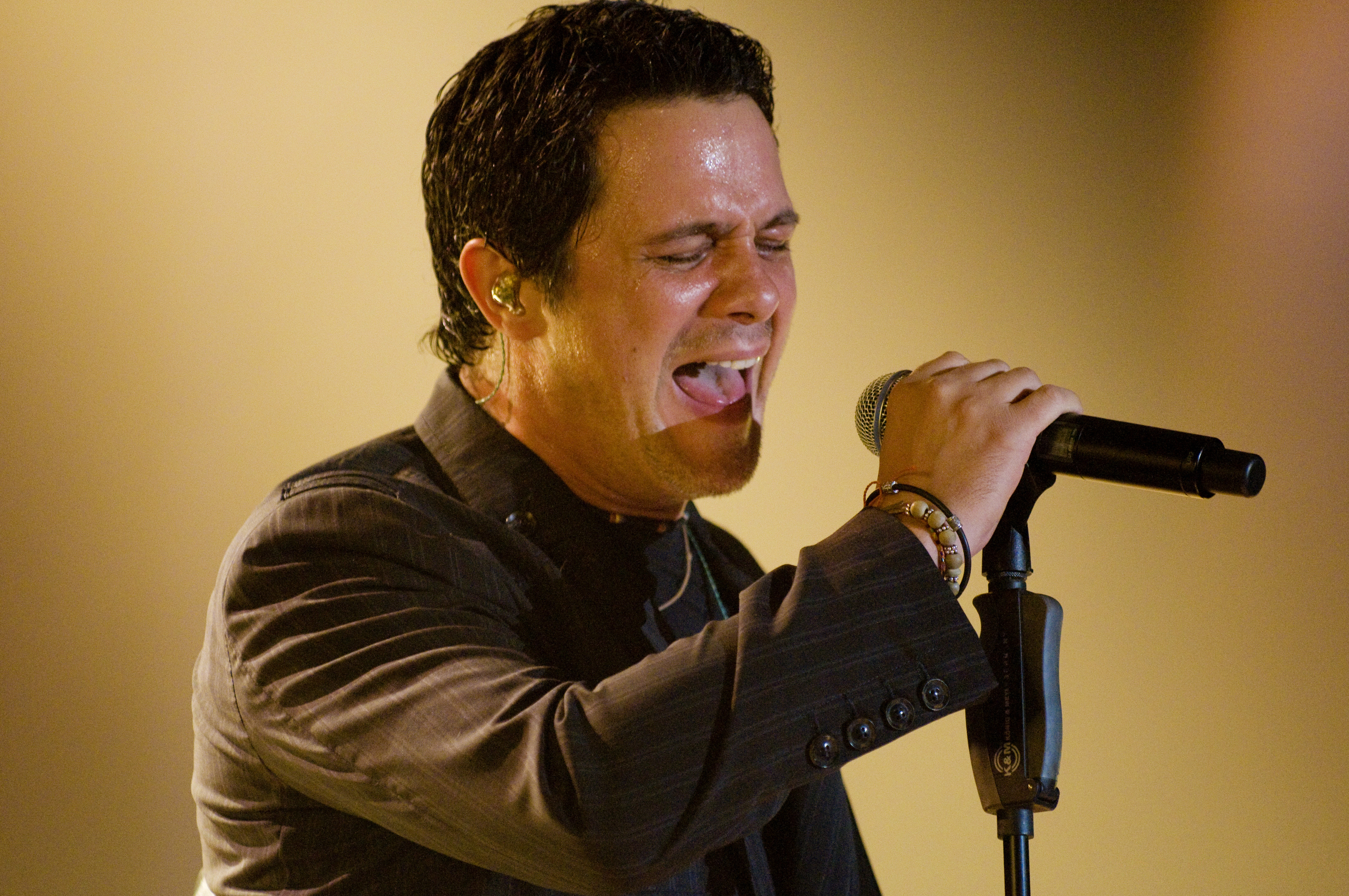
Sanz performing on 28 May 2008.

To promote his new record, Paraíso Express, Sanz started a campaign in which fans could create a video about their definition of paradise and upload it to his YouTube channel. Artists such as Shakira, Laura Pausini and Paulina Rubio also participated. On 10 November 2009, Sanz released Paraíso Express. This record was described as a return to form for Sanz, focusing more on melody as opposed to the experimentation he pursued on his previous two albums. He commented that "On this album, I first composed the melody and then the lyrics. It is more of a rock album than my past releases, with more elegant and positive lyrics and a happier and more rhythmic spirit." The bilingual single "Looking for Paradise" featuring Alicia Keys reached number one on the Billboard Hot Latin Songs chart. At the 2010 Latin Grammy Awards, the album was nominated Album of the Year and Best Male Pop Vocal Album, while the single "Desde Cuándo" received both Record and Song of the Year nominations.

On 15 February 2011, Sanz announced that he would be signing with Universal Music Group after twenty years with Warner. In the same year, Sanz received the Latin Heritage Award by the American Society of Composers, Authors and Publishers (ASCAP) in recognition of his contributions to Latin music. On 2 September 2012, the singer unveiled the official artwork of his upcoming ninth studio album, La Música No Se Toca on his official site. Sanz released La Música No Se Toca, featuring the single "No Me Compares" and based on the opening theme song in the telenovela Amores Verdaderos, on 25 September 2012. On 21 August 2012, Sanz released his new single "Irrepetível (Me Sumerjo)", a duet with Brazilian singer-songwriter Ana Carolina. The song is a Portuguese-Spanish song and it's only available in Brazil's iTunes. On 17 September, he released the album's second single, "Se Vende". In 2013, Sanz was recognized as the Pop Male Artist of the Year and was the recipient of the Excellence Award at the 26th Lo Nuestro Awards for his achievements in the music industry.

=== 2013–2017: Sirope and #ElDisco ===
On 6 November 2013, Sanz received an honorary doctor of music degree from Berklee College of Music. "It is a great honor for me to receive this doctorate degree from one of the most prestigious music schools in the world," Sanz said of the Berklee recognition. "I will continue to work every day of my life to deserve this honor."

Sanz released his eleventh studio album, Sirope, featuring the single "A Que No Me Dejas", a collaboration with Alejandro Fernandez and used as the opening theme song in the telenovela A Que No Me Dejas, on 4 May 2015. The album took a year and one month to record, and features an "eclectic sound" in Sanz's words, containing elements of flamenco, R&B, and folk music. He worked with producer Sebastian Krys, who helped him "enrich what was there but [not lose] the essence" of the songs.

In November 2017, Alejandro Sanz was honored as the Latin Recording Academy's Person of the Year.

=== 2018–2020: ElDisco, La Gira and El Mundo Fuera ===
In November 2018, he released the single "No tengo nada", which would be the first from her next album, which was finally confirmed to be called #ElDisco.

In April 2019, he released his album #ElDisco. The album was recorded in Miami and features collaborations Camila Cabello, Nicky Jam, Residente, and Catalan singer-songwriter Judit Neddermann.

In May 2020, Sanz announced the new dates for his La Gira tour, which was originally slated to begin in June 2020 but was rescheduled to June 2021 due to the COVID-19 pandemic. The tour will begin on 12 June 2021, in Valencia.

=== 2021–2023: Star on the Walk of Fame, SANZ, SANZ en VIVO and Correcaminos EP ===
In July 2021, he was one of several artists singing "Imagine" as a part of the 2020 Summer Olympics opening ceremony, representing Europe. On 29 October 2020, Sanz appeared alongside Argentine singer TINI on "Un Beso en Madrid", the eighth single from her third album Tini Tini Tini.

=== 2024–present: ¿Y Ahora Qué? ===
On 15 September 2024, Sanz announced the release of a Netflix docuseries about his current and future plans.

In 14 October, Sanz received the Billboard Latin Music Lifetime Achievement Award.

On 17 May 2025, Sanz announced a new EP titled ¿Y Ahora Qué?. The EP was released on 23 May and features six songs, including collaborations with Manuel Turizo, Grupo Frontera and Shakira. On the day of release, the Shakira and Alejandro Sanz duet "Bésame", their third collaboration, was released as a single.

== Musical style ==
Early in his career, Sanz' music generally consisted of romantic ballads. However, in the late 1990s, his collaborations with other artists greatly expanded his musical style. On No Es lo Mismo, he experimented with rock, salsa, and hip hop. While recording the album, Sanz noted that he often entered the studio with a rough idea for a song and the guest artists would "contaminate it with their rhythms...in a good way." El Tren de los Momentos continued this pattern of musical experimentation, featuring diverse genres such as funk, jazz, and country. Despite this, Jason Birchmeier of Allmusic described his musical evolution by saying "Even as Sanz broadened his style over the years, he never ventured far from his strength: romantic songs, generally ballads, tinged with flamenco and sung wholeheartedly with his distinct voice."

Sanz is known for his distinctive raspy vocals, which he attributes to his flamenco roots, crediting singer Camarón de la Isla as a major influence. His song "Sí, He Cantado Mal" (Yes, I Have Sung Badly) from No Es lo Mismo references this, with Sanz saying "I'm laughing a little at myself so that I can laugh at other things. Sometimes, I'm harder on myself than any music critic can be. I'm laughing at that." Throughout his youth, Sanz was heavily influenced by English-language heavy metal groups such as Iron Maiden and Dio, referring to himself as a "heavy metal radical". He also feels that living in the city of Cádiz had a major impact on his musical style, where "Any 7-year-old kid you find knows how to play guitar, play the cajón, knows how to sing. When the family comes together we start to sing. In a way it's not just music, it's culture."

== Personal life ==
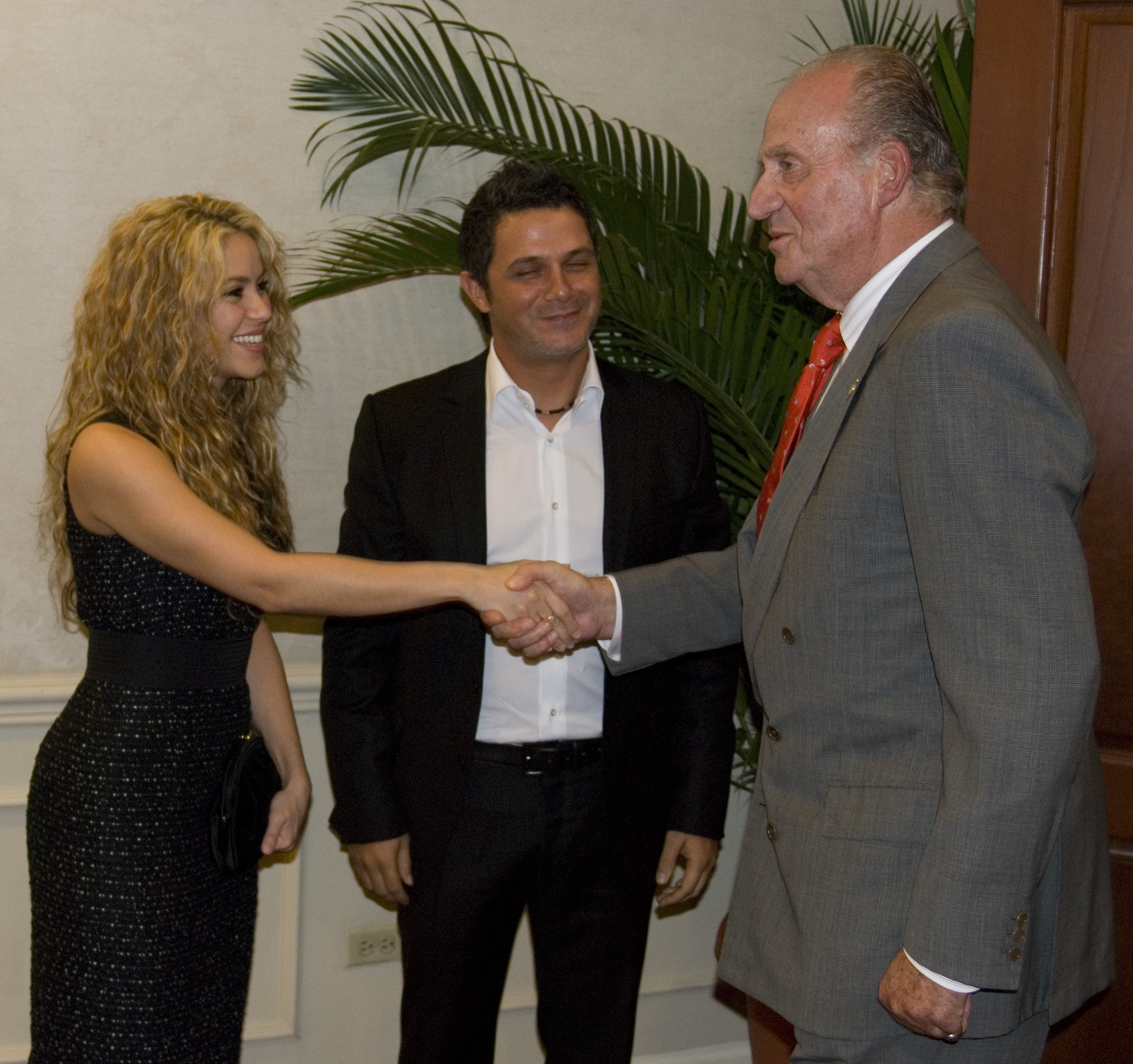
Sanz with Shakira and Juan Carlos I, the King of Spain during the IberoAmerican Summit of El Salvador.

Sanz married Mexican fashion model and actress Jaydy Michel in Bali on 30 December 1999, but this marriage was never legally recognized in either of their home countries. Sanz felt that having a legally recognized marriage was unnecessary: "My wife is my wife and I am her husband. For me, that has enough validity...I am married with the heart." Their daughter, Manuela Sánchez Michel, was born on 28 July 2001. The couple separated in 2005. Sanz later had a son named Alexander with Valeria Rivera, a Puerto Rican fashion designer.

Sanz married his former assistant, Raquel Perera, on 23 May 2012, in a private ceremony held in Sabadell, Barcelona. They have two children: a son, Dylan, born in 2011 in New York, and a daughter, Alma, born in 2014 in Madrid. The couple separated in July 2019.

The late Flamenco guitarist Paco de Lucía was the godfather of Sanz's son, and Sanz and his wife are godparents to David Bisbal's daughter, Ella.

In addition to music, Sanz enjoys painting, which he often does while trying to create ideas for new songs. He explains that painting "teaches you that taking risks rarely leads to failure. In fact, from the moment you assume a risk, you have succeeded."

In 2016, Sanz gave an interview to a women's magazine, where he shared his support for efforts taken against violence against women saying that the man who "beats a woman, beats the whole humanity". He also wore make-up in an expression of support for women.

In January 2019, Sanz expressed support for Juan Guaidó during the Venezuelan presidential crisis during a livestreamed Instagram interview. During the interview, Sanz recognized Guaidó as interim President of Venezuela.

In October 2021, Sanz had a star on the Hollywood Walk of Fame inaugurated corresponding to the Recording category. The ceremony took place at 1750 Vine Street, in front of the Capitol Records building. He was accompanied by his partner, Cuban artist Rachel Valdés, who he mentioned in his speech: "To Rachel, a woman whose hands hold the dreams of my heart. I love you very much".

== Filmography ==
| Year | Title | Notes |
|---|---|---|
| 2003 | Celebridade | Musical Guest |
| 2015 | A que no me dejas | Musical Guest |
| 2018 | Lo Que Fui es Lo Que Soy | Documental |

== Discography ==
=== Studio albums ===
- 1989: Los Chulos Son Pa' Cuidarlos
- 1991: Viviendo Deprisa
- 1993: Si Tú Me Miras
- 1995: 3
- 1997: Más
- 2000: El Alma al Aire
- 2003: No Es lo Mismo
- 2006: El Tren de los Momentos
- 2009: Paraíso Express
- 2012: La Música No Se Toca
- 2015: Sirope
- 2019: #ElDisco
- 2021: Sanz
- 2025: ¿Y Ahora Qué?

== Tours ==
- (1990–1992) Viviendo Deprisa Tour
- (1993–1994) Si Tú Me Miras Tour
- (1995–1996) 3 Tour
- (1998) Más Tour
- (2001–2002) El Alma Al Aire Tour
- (2004) No Es Lo Mismo Tour
- (2007–2008) El Tren De Los Momentos Tour
- (2009–2011) Paraiso Tour
- (2012–2014) La Música No Se Toca Tour
- (2015) Sirope Tour
- (2019–2022) ESP
- (2023) Sanz En Vivo 2023
- (2026) ¿y ahora qué? Tour

== See also ==
- List of best-selling Latin music artists
